= Archery at the 2012 Summer Olympics =

Coordinates: 51.5294°N 0.1727°W

Archery at the Games of the XXX Olympiad
- Venue: Lord's Cricket Ground
- Dates: 27 July – 3 August 2012
- No. of events: 4 (2 men, 2 women)
- Competitors: 128

The archery events at the 2012 Olympic Games in London were held over an eight-day period from 27 July to 3 August. Four events took place, all being staged at Lord's Cricket Ground in front of temporary stands built to accommodate up to 6,500 spectators.

South Korea was the most successful nation, topping the Olympic archery medal table with three golds and four medals in total.

== Competition format ==
A total of 128 athletes, 64 women and 64 men, competed across the four events: the men's individual, women's individual, men's team, and women's team.

All four events were recurve archery events, held under the FITA-approved 70-metre distance and rules. The competition started with an initial ranking round involving all 64 archers of each gender. Each archer shot a total of 72 arrows to be seeded from 1–64 according to their score.

The ranking round was also used to seed the teams from 1 to 12, by aggregating the individual scores for the members of each team.

Each event was then played in a single-elimination tournament format, except for the semi-final losers, who played-off to decide the bronze medal winner.

=== Individual events ===
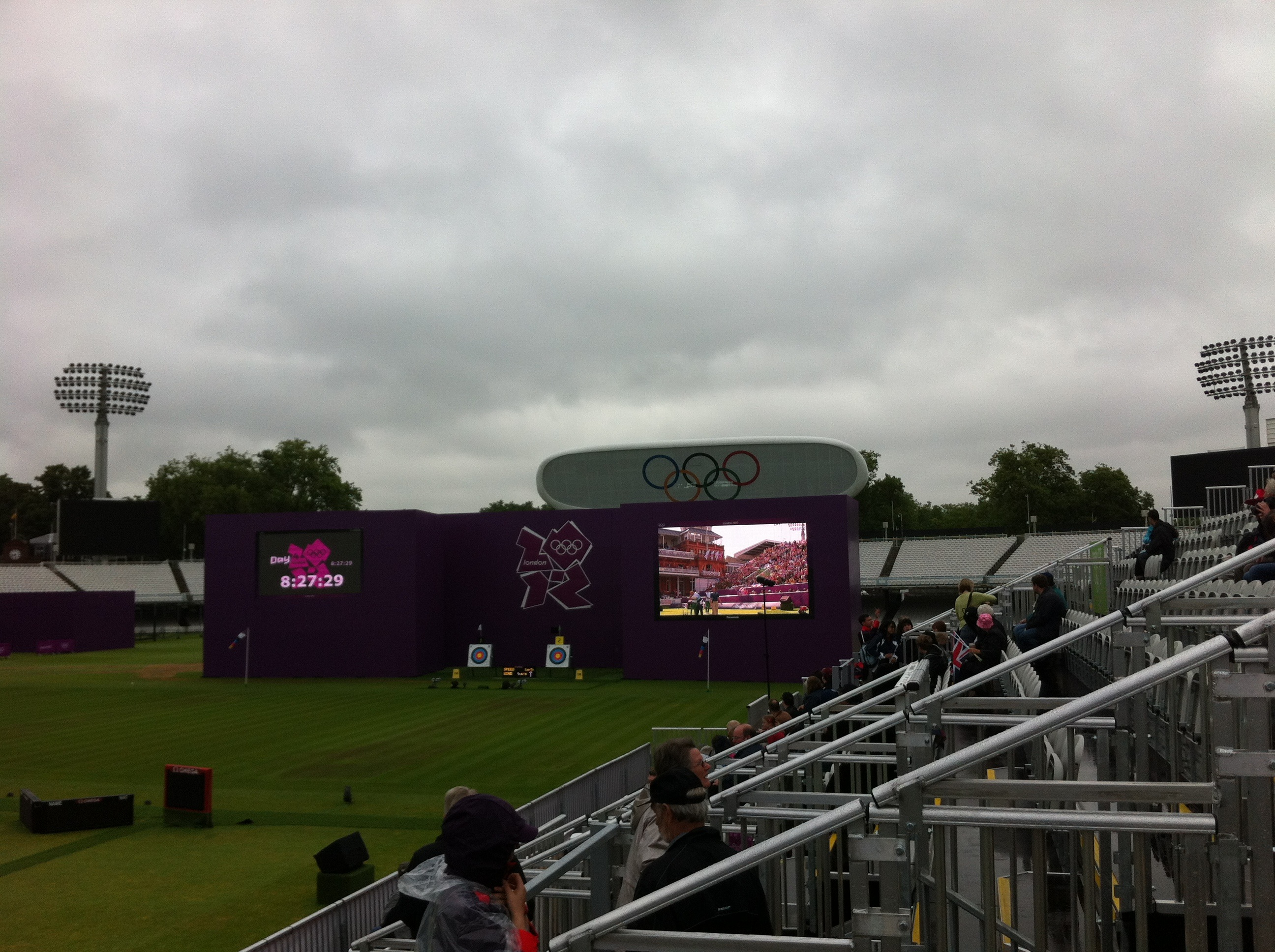
Lord's Cricket Ground hosted the archery events at the 2012 Games.

In the individual events, all 64 competitors entered the competition at the first round, the round of 64. The draw was seeded according to the result of the ranking round so the first seed shot against the 64th seed in the first round.

Each match was the best-of-five sets, with three arrows per set. The winner of each set received two points, and if the scores in the set were tied then each archer received one point. If at the end of five sets the score was tied at 5–5, a single arrow shoot-off would be held and the closest to the centre would be declared the winner.

=== Team events ===
In the team events, the top four seeded teams from the ranking round received a bye to the quarter-final. The remaining eight teams, seeded 5th to 12th, competed for the remaining four places in the quarter-finals.

Each match consisted of 24 arrows from each team (eight from each team member) and the team with the highest score progressed. In the event of scores being tied, a three-arrow shoot-off would take place.

== Schedule ==
All times are British Summer Time (UTC+01:00).

Day	Date	Start	Finish	Event	Phase
Day 0	Friday 27 July 2012	9:00	15:00	Men's individual	Ranking round
Day 0	Friday 27 July 2012	9:00	15:00	Women's individual	Ranking round
Day 1	Saturday 28 July 2012	9:00	19:00	Men's team	Eliminations/Medal round
Day 2	Sunday 29 July 2012	9:00	19:00	Women's team	Eliminations/Medal round
Day 3	Monday 30 July 2012	9:00	17:40	Men's individual	1/32 & 1/16 Eliminations
Day 3	Monday 30 July 2012	9:00	17:40	Women's individual	1/32 & 1/16 Eliminations
Day 4	Tuesday 31 July 2012	9:00	17:40	Men's individual	1/32 & 1/16 Eliminations
Day 4	Tuesday 31 July 2012	9:00	17:40	Women's individual	1/32 & 1/16 Eliminations
Day 5	Wednesday 1 August 2012	9:00	19:00	Men's individual	1/32 & 1/16 Eliminations
Day 5	Wednesday 1 August 2012	9:00	19:00	Women's individual	1/32 & 1/16 Eliminations
Day 6	Thursday 2 August 2012	9:00	16:20	Women's individual	1/8 Eliminations/Quarter/Semi finals/Medal round
Day 7	Friday 3 August 2012	9:00	16:20	Men's individual	1/8 Eliminations/Quarter/Semi finals/Medal round

== Qualification ==
Each National Olympic Committee (NOC) was permitted to enter a maximum of six competitors, three per gender. NOCs that qualified teams for a particular gender were able to send a three-member team to the team event and also have each member compete in the individual event. There were 12 team spots for each gender, thus qualifying 36 individuals through team qualification. All other NOCs may earn a maximum of one quota place per gender for the individual events.

Six places were reserved for Great Britain as the host nation, and a further six were decided by the Tripartite Commission. The remaining 116 places were then allocated through a qualification process, in which archers earned quota places for their respective NOCs, though not necessarily for themselves.

To be eligible to participate in the Olympic Games after the NOC has obtained a quota place, all archers must have achieved the following minimum qualification score (MQS):

- Men: FITA round of 1230 or 70m round of 625
- Women: FITA round of 1230 or 70m round of 600

The MQS must have been achieved between 2 July 2011 (starting at the 2011 World Outdoor Archery Championships) and 1 July 2012 at a registered FITA event.

== Medal summary ==
=== Medal table ===
Rank	Nation	Gold	Silver	Bronze	Total
1	South Korea	3	0	1	4
2	Italy	1	0	0	1
3	China	0	1	1	2
3	Japan	0	1	1	2
3	Mexico	0	1	1	2
6	United States	0	1	0	1
Totals (6 entries)		4	4	4	12

=== Medalists ===
Event	Gold	Silver	Bronze
Men's individual	Oh Jin-hyek; South Korea	Takaharu Furukawa; Japan	Dai Xiaoxiang; China
Men's team	Italy; Michele Frangilli; Marco Galiazzo; Mauro Nespoli	United States; Brady Ellison; Jake Kaminski; Jacob Wukie	South Korea; Im Dong-hyun; Kim Bub-min; Oh Jin-hyek
Women's individual	Ki Bo-Bae; South Korea	Aída Román; Mexico	Mariana Avitia; Mexico
Women's team	South Korea; Choi Hyeon-ju; Ki Bo-bae; Lee Sung-jin	China; Cheng Ming; Fang Yuting; Xu Jing	Japan; Ren Hayakawa; Miki Kanie; Kaori Kawanaka

=== Gallery ===
Gallery of some of the Olympic medalists in the archery competitions:

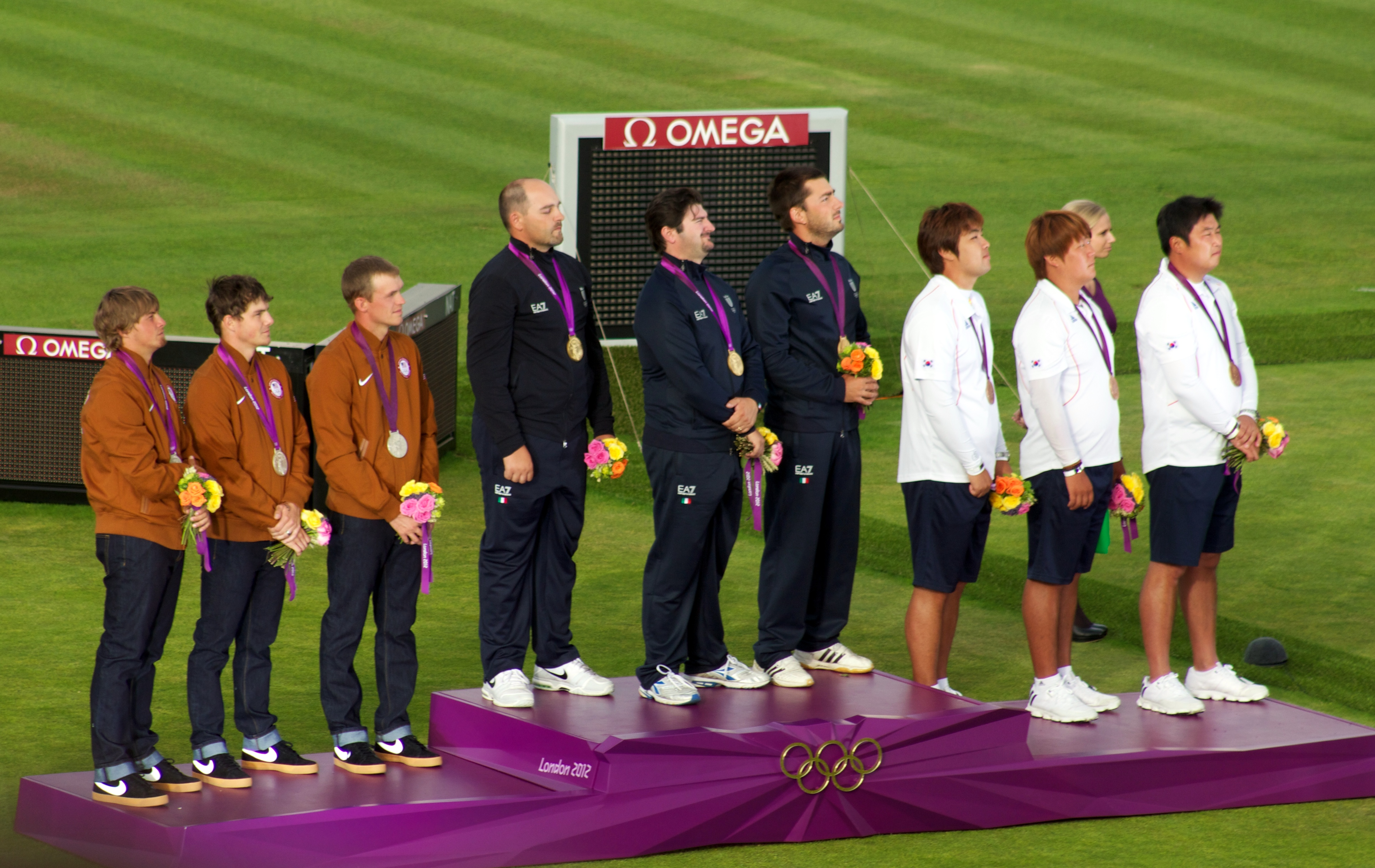
The podium for the men's team event, featuring the United States (left, silver), Italy (centre, gold), and South Korea (right, bronze)

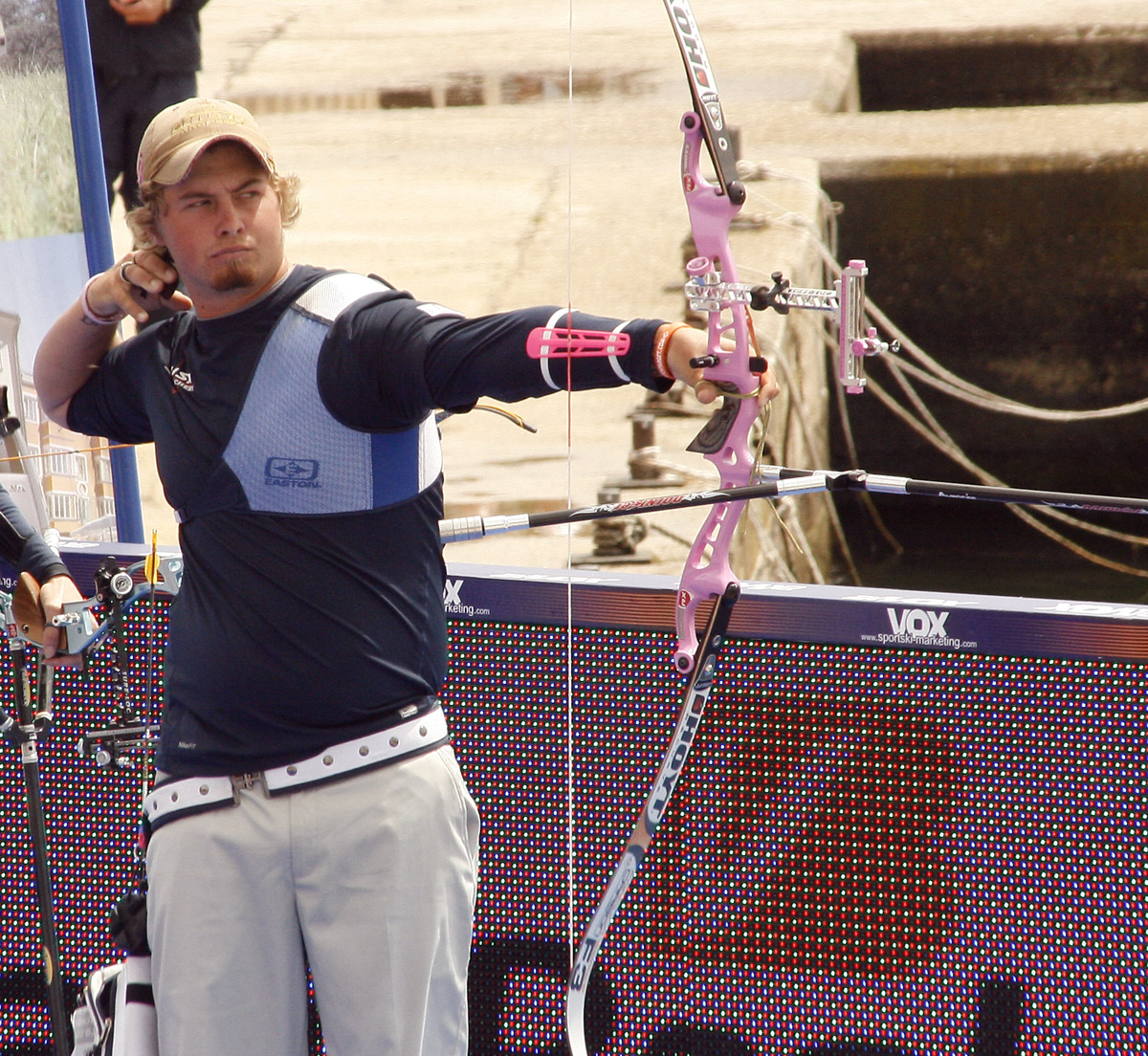
Brady Ellison won silver in the men's team event
