= Archery at the 2019 European Games – Men's team recurve =

2019 European Games sports event (archery)

Men's team recurve at the 2019 European Games
- Venue: Olympic Sports Complex
- Date: 21, 22 June
- Competitors: 24 from 8 nations

Medalists
gold medal	Thomas Chirault; Pierre Plihon; Jean-Charles Valladont	France
silver medal	Sjef van den Berg; Jan van Tongeren; Steve Wijler	Netherlands
bronze medal	Marco Galiazzo; Mauro Nespoli; David Pasqualucci	Italy

The men's team recurve competition at the 2019 European Games was held from 21 to 22 June 2019 at the Olympic Sports Complex in Minsk, Belarus.

== Records ==
Prior to the competition, the existing world, European and Games records were as follows:

- 216 arrow ranking round

World record	South Korea (KOR); Im Dong-hyun; Kim Bub-min; Oh Jin-hyek	2087	London, Great Britain	27 July 2012
European record	Netherlands (NED); Rick van der Ven; Sjef van den Berg; Steve Wijler	2045	Bucharest, Romania	10 April 2019
Games record	Netherlands; Rick van der Ven; Sjef van den Berg; Mitch Dielemans	2012	Baku, Azerbaijan	16 May 2015

== Ranking round ==
The ranking round took place on 21 June 2019 to determine the seeding for the knockout rounds.

Rank	Nation	Archer	Individual total	Team total
1	France	Thomas Chirault; Pierre Plihon; Jean-Charles Valladont	675; 684; 665	2024 GR
2	Netherlands	Sjef van den Berg; Jan van Tongeren; Steve Wijler	679; 668; 667	2014
3	Spain	Pablo Acha; Miguel Alvariño; Daniel Castro	675; 674; 660	2009
4	Great Britain	Tom Hall; Patrick Huston; Alexander Wise	661; 666; 648	1975
5	Italy	Marco Galiazzo; Mauro Nespoli; David Pasqualucci	651; 678; 629	1958
6	Russia	Arsalan Baldanov; Galsan Bazarzhapov; Vitalii Popov	647; 665; 637	1949
7	Belarus	Pavel Dalidovich; Kiryl Firsau; Aliaksandr Liahusheu	644; 650; 636	1930
8	Luxembourg	Jeff Henckels; Joe Klein; Pit Klein	645; 653; 607	1905

== Elimination rounds ==
Quarterfinals
1	France (FRA)	5	53	57	49	55	29
8	Luxembourg (LUX)	4	51	60	56	51	27
5	Italy (ITA)	5	54	57	57
4	Great Britain (GBR)	1	51	57	52
3	Spain (ESP)	6	54	49	56	57
6	Russia (RUS)	2	51	53	55	56
7	Belarus (BLR)	0	50	53	54
2	Netherlands (NED)	6	52	56	56

Semifinals
1	France (FRA)	6	58	55	57
5	Italy (ITA)	0	57	53	55
3	Spain (ESP)	1	55	56	54
2	Netherlands (NED)	5	59	58	54

Gold medal match
1	France (FRA)	5	57	56	54	53	30
2	Netherlands (NED)	4	56	54	55	57	27
Third place
5	Italy (ITA)	6	57	56	56	54
3	Spain (ESP)	2	52	54	57	50
