= Mexico at the 2012 Summer Olympics =

- IOC code: MEX
- NOC: Mexican Olympic Committee
- Website: soycom.org (in Spanish)

in London
- Competitors: 102 in 23 sports
- Flag bearers: María Espinoza (opening and closing)
- Medals Ranked 39th: Gold 1 Silver 3 Bronze 4 Total 8

Summer Olympics appearances (overview)
- 1900; 1904–1920; 1924; 1928; 1932; 1936; 1948; 1952; 1956; 1960; 1964; 1968; 1972; 1976; 1980; 1984; 1988; 1992; 1996; 2000; 2004; 2008; 2012; 2016; 2020; 2024; 2028

Mexico competed at the 2012 Summer Olympics in London, from 27 July to 12 August 2012. This was the nation's twenty-second appearance at the Olympics since its debut in 1900. Comité Olímpico Mexicano sent a total of 102 athletes to the Games, 64 men and 38 women, to compete in 23 sports. Men's football was the only team sport in which Mexico was represented at these Olympic Games. There was only a single competitor in badminton, sprint canoeing, and table tennis.

The Mexican team featured several medal prospects for London, including taekwondo jin and defending champion María Espinoza, who was the nation's flag bearer at the opening ceremony. Equestrian show jumper Jaime Azcárraga, who had competed in Olympics since 1984, marked his return in London after a twenty-year absence and was also the oldest member of the team, at age 52. Laser Radial sailor Tania Elías Calles and windsurfer David Mier, on the other hand, competed at their fourth Olympics.

This was Mexico's most successful Olympics where it was not the host nation, winning a total of 8 medals (1 gold, 3 silver, and 4 bronze), and surpassing their record from Los Angeles and Sydney by a single medal. Three of these medals were awarded to the athletes in diving, and two in archery for the first time. Among the nation's medalists were springboard diver Laura Sánchez, who won Mexico's first Olympic medal for a female in an individual event. Meanwhile, taekwondo jin María Espinoza and platform diver Paola Espinosa became the first Mexican women in history to win a total of two Olympic medals. Mexico also set a milestone in its team sports, as the men's football team won its first ever Olympic gold medal in the final match against Brazil.

== Medalists ==
Medal	Name	Sport	Event	Date
Gold	Mexico national under-23 football team: José de Jesús Corona; Israel Jiménez; Carlos Salcido; Hiram Mier; Dárvin Chávez; Héctor Herrera; Javier Cortés; Marco Fabián; Oribe Peralta; Giovani dos Santos; Javier Aquino; Raúl Jiménez; Diego Reyes; Jorge Enríquez; Néstor Vidrio; Miguel Ponce; Néstor Araujo; José Antonio Rodríguez	Football	Men's tournament	11 August
Silver	Iván García; Germán Sánchez	Diving	Men's 10 m synchronized platform	30 July
Silver	Paola Espinosa; Alejandra Orozco	Diving	Women's 10 m synchronized platform	31 July
Silver	Aída Román	Archery	Women's individual	2 August
Bronze	Mariana Avitia	Archery	Women's individual	2 August
Bronze	Laura Sánchez	Diving	Women's 3 m springboard	5 August
Bronze	María Espinoza	Taekwondo	Women's +67 kg	11 August
Bronze	Luz Acosta	Weightlifting	Women's 63 kg	31 July

Medals by sport
Sport	1st place, gold medalist(s)	2nd place, silver medalist(s)	3rd place, bronze medalist(s)	Total
Football	1	0	0	1
Diving	0	2	1	3
Archery	0	1	1	2
Taekwondo	0	0	1	1
Weightlifting	0	0	1	1
Total	1	3	4	8

== Competitors ==
Sport	Men	Women	Total
Archery	3	3	6
Athletics	14	5	19
Badminton	0	1	1
Boxing	2	0	2
Canoeing	1	0	1
Cycling	1	1	2
Diving	5	5	10
Equestrian	4	0	4
Fencing	1	1	2
Football	18	0	18
Gymnastics	1	1	2
Judo	1	1	2
Modern pentathlon	1	1	2
Rowing	1	1	2
Sailing	2	1	3
Shooting	1	3	4
Swimming	2	7	9
Synchronized swimming	0	2	2
Table tennis	0	1	1
Taekwondo	2	2	4
Triathlon	1	1	2
Weightlifting	1	1	2
Wrestling	2	0	2
Total	64	38	102

Medals by date
Date	1st place, gold medalist(s)	2nd place, silver medalist(s)	3rd place, bronze medalist(s)	Total
28 July	0	0	0	0
29 July	0	0	0	0
30 July	0	1	0	1
31 July	0	1	1	2
1 Aug	0	0	0	0
2 Aug	0	1	1	2
3 Aug	0	0	0	0
4 Aug	0	0	0	0
5 Aug	0	0	1	1
6 Aug	0	0	0	0
7 Aug	0	0	0	0
8 Aug	0	0	0	0
9 Aug	0	0	0	0
10 Aug	0	0	0	0
11 Aug	1	0	1	2
12 Aug	0	0	0	0
Total	1	3	4	8

== Archery ==
Men

Athlete	Event	Ranking round		Round of 64	Round of 32	Round of 16	Quarterfinals	Semifinals	Final / BM	
Athlete	Event	Score	Seed	Opposition Score	Opposition Score	Opposition Score	Opposition Score	Opposition Score	Opposition Score	Rank
Luis Álvarez	Individual	665	30	Hristov (BUL) (35); W 6–0	Oh J-H (KOR) (3); L 2–6	Did not advance				
Juan René Serrano	Individual	665	29	Galiazzo (ITA) (36); W 6–2	Godfrey (GBR) (4); L 1–7	Did not advance				
Eduardo Vélez	Individual	666	26	Vaziri (IRI) (39); W 7–1	Dai Xx (CHN) (7); L 0–6	Did not advance				
Luis Álvarez; Juan René Serrano; Eduardo Vélez	Team	1996	7	—N/a		Malaysia (10); W 216–211	France (2); W 220–212	Italy (6); L 215–217	South Korea (1); L 219–224	4

Women

Athlete	Event	Ranking round		Round of 64	Round of 32	Round of 16	Quarterfinals	Semifinals	Final / BM	
Athlete	Event	Score	Seed	Opposition Score	Opposition Score	Opposition Score	Opposition Score	Opposition Score	Opposition Score	Rank
Mariana Avitia	Individual	659	10	Dehghan (IRI) (55); W 6–2	Folkard (GBR) (42); W 6–2	Christiansen (DEN) (7); W 6–2	Lee S-J (KOR) (2); W 6–2	Román (MEX) (11); L 2–6	Lorig (USA) (4); W 6–2	3rd place, bronze medalist(s)
Aída Román	Individual	658	11	Bannova (KAZ) (54); W 6–2	Devi (IND) (22); W 6–2	Kanie (JPN) (6); W 7–3	Lionetti (ITA) (19); W 6–2	Avitia (MEX) (10); W 6–2	Ki B-B (KOR) (1); L 5–6	2nd place, silver medalist(s)
Alejandra Valencia	Individual	657	13	Parnät (EST) (52); W 7–1	Cheng M (CHN) (20); L 1–7	Did not advance				
Mariana Avitia; Aída Román; Alejandra Valencia	Team	1974	4	—N/a		Bye	Japan (5); L 209–219	Did not advance		

== Athletics ==
Key

- Note–Ranks given for track events are within the athlete's heat only
- Q = Qualified for the next round
- q = Qualified for the next round as a fastest loser or, in field events, by position without achieving the qualifying target
- NR = National record
- N/A = Round not applicable for the event
- Bye = Athlete not required to compete in round

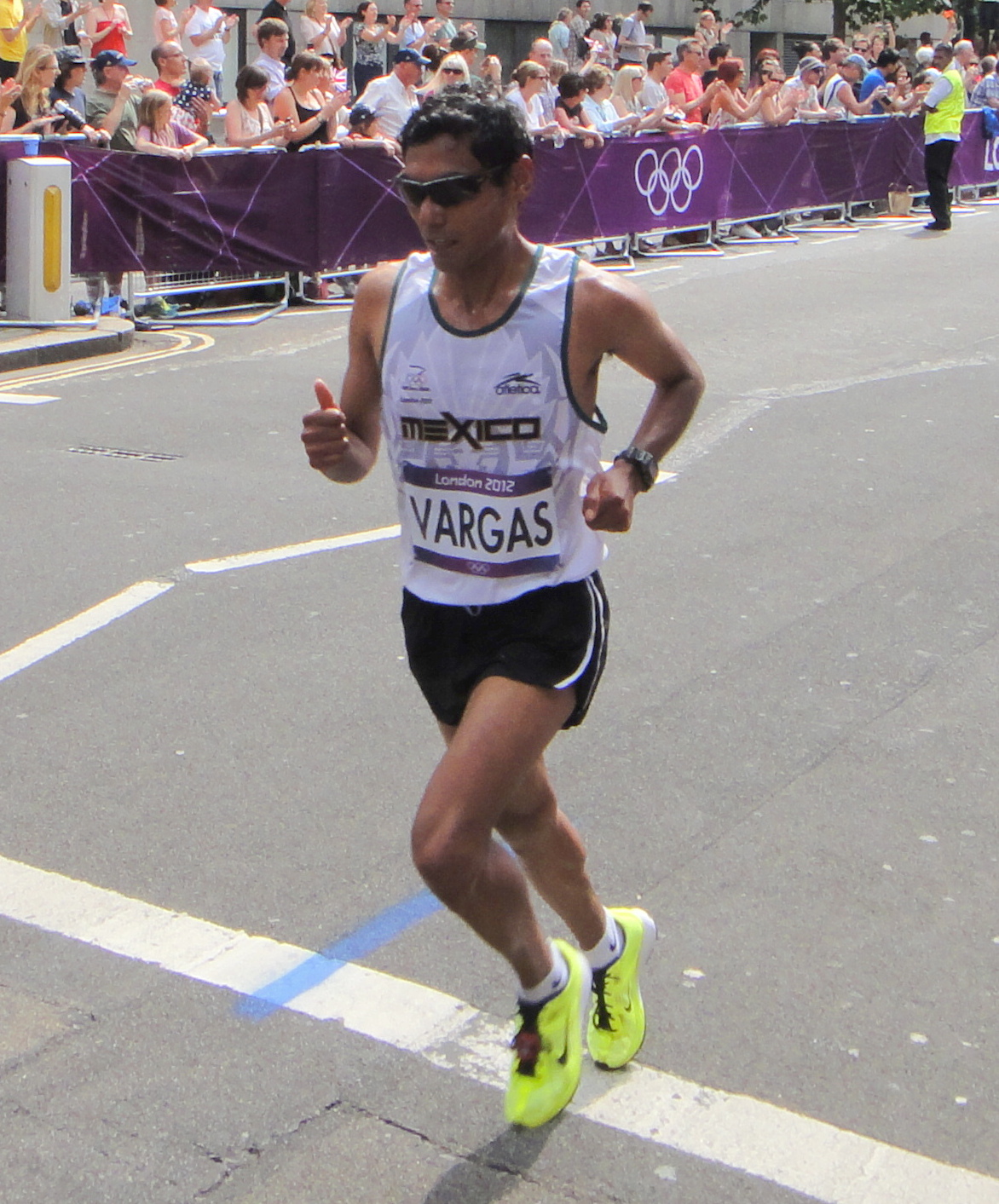
Daniel Vargas finished thirty-ninth in men's marathon.

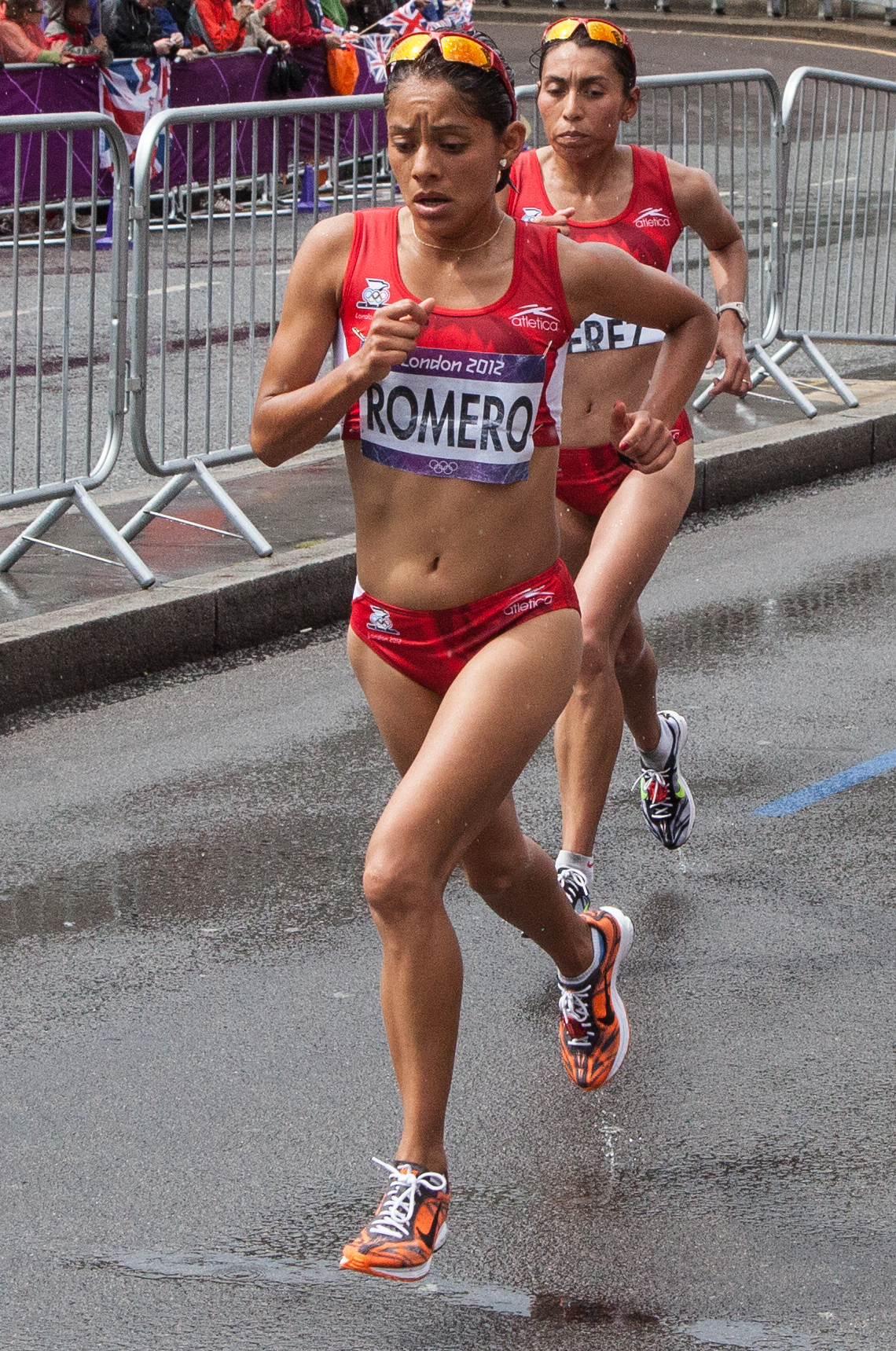
Marisol Romero finished forty-sixth in women's marathon.

Men
Track & road events

Athlete	Event	Heat		Semifinal		Final	
Athlete	Event	Result	Rank	Result	Rank	Result	Rank
José Carlos Herrera	200 m	21.17	7	Did not advance			
Juan Luis Barrios	5000 m	13:21.01	9 q	—N/a		13:45.30	8
Diego Estrada	10000 m	—N/a				28:36.19	21
Carlos Cordero	Marathon	—N/a				2:22:08	60
Arturo Malaquias	Marathon	—N/a				2:26:37	70
Daniel Vargas	Marathon	—N/a				2:18:26	39
Ever Palma	20 km walk	—N/a				1:26:30	46
Isaac Palma	20 km walk	—N/a				1:23:35	34
Eder Sánchez	20 km walk	—N/a				1:19:52	6
José Leyver Ojeda	50 km walk	—N/a				3:55:00	28
Horacio Nava	50 km walk	—N/a				3:46:59	16
Omar Zepeda	50 km walk	—N/a				3:49:14	23

Field events

Athlete	Event	Qualification		Final	
Athlete	Event	Distance	Position	Distance	Position
Luis Rivera	Long jump	7.42	32	Did not advance	
Stephen Saenz	Shot put	18.65	32	Did not advance	

Women
Track & road events

Athlete	Event	Heat		Final	
Athlete	Event	Result	Rank	Result	Rank
Sandra López	5000 m	15:55.16	16	Did not advance	
Karina Pérez	Marathon	—N/a		2:33:30	50
Marisol Romero	Marathon	—N/a		2:33:08	46
Mónica Equihua	20 km walk	—N/a		1:32:28	30

== Badminton ==
Athlete	Event	Group Stage			Round of 16	Quarterfinals	Semifinals	Final / BM	
Athlete	Event	Opposition Score	Opposition Score	Rank	Opposition Score	Opposition Score	Opposition Score	Opposition Score	Rank
Victoria Montero	Women's singles	Nieminen (FIN); L 12–21, 18–21	Tai T-y (TPE); L 6–21, 10–21	3	Did not advance				

== Boxing ==
Men

Athlete	Event	Round of 32	Round of 16	Quarterfinals	Semifinals	Final	
Athlete	Event	Opposition Result	Opposition Result	Opposition Result	Opposition Result	Opposition Result	Rank
Óscar Valdez	Bantamweight	Thapa (IND); W 14–9	Yunusov (TJK); W 13–7	Nevin (IRL); L 13–19	Did not advance		
Óscar Molina	Welterweight	Clayton (CAN); L 8–12	Did not advance				

== Canoeing ==
=== Sprint ===
Athlete	Event	Heats		Semifinals		Finals	
Athlete	Event	Time	Rank	Time	Rank	Time	Rank
Everardo Cristóbal	Men's C-1 200 m	44.459	4 Q	44.571	7	Did not advance	
Everardo Cristóbal	Men's C-1 1000 m	3:58.673	5 Q	3:54.590	5 FB	3:56.118	10

Legend: FA = Qualify to final A (medal); FB = Qualify to final B (non-medal); OB = Olympic Best

== Cycling ==
=== Road ===
Athlete	Event	Time	Rank
Hugo Rangel	Men's road race	5:46.37	=27
Íngrid Drexel	Women's road race	OTL	

== Diving ==
Men

Athlete	Event	Preliminaries		Semifinals		Final	
Athlete	Event	Points	Rank	Points	Rank	Points	Rank
Yahel Castillo	3 m springboard	475.25	5 Q	499.65	4 Q	492.70	6
Daniel Islas	3 m springboard	410.60	23	Did not advance			
Iván García	10 m platform	491.70	6 Q	497.40	10 Q	521.65	7
Germán Sánchez	10 m platform	495.85	5 Q	477.30	14	Did not advance	
Yahel Castillo; Julián Sánchez	3 m synchronized springboard	—N/a				415.14	7
Iván García; Germán Sánchez	10 m synchronized platform	—N/a				468.90	2nd place, silver medalist(s)

Women

Athlete	Event	Preliminaries		Semifinals		Final	
Athlete	Event	Points	Rank	Points	Rank	Points	Rank
Arantxa Chávez	3 m springboard	225.45	29	Did not advance			
Laura Sánchez	3 m springboard	320.15	9 Q	336.50	7 Q	362.40	3rd place, bronze medalist(s)
Paola Espinosa	10 m platform	324.00	13 Q	317.10	11 Q	356.20	6
Carolina Mendoza	10 m platform	286.95	21	Did not advance			
Paola Espinosa; Alejandra Orozco	10 m synchronized platform	—N/a				343.32	2nd place, silver medalist(s)

== Equestrian ==
=== Jumping ===
Athlete	Horse	Event	Qualification								Final					Total	
Athlete	Horse	Event	Round 1		Round 2			Round 3			Round A		Round B			Total	
Athlete	Horse	Event	Penalties	Rank	Penalties	Total	Rank	Penalties	Total	Rank	Penalties	Rank	Penalties	Total	Rank	Penalties	Rank
Jaime Azcárraga	Gángster	Individual	12	67	Did not advance											12	67
Federico Fernández	Victoria	Individual	5	53 Q	6	11	53	Did not advance								11	53
Alberto Michán	Rosalía la Silla	Individual	0	=1 Q	0	0	=1 Q	9	9	22 Q	4	11 Q	0	4	5	4	5
Nicolás Pizarro	Crossing Jordan	Individual	4	=42 Q	4	8	31 Q	20	28	44	Did not advance					28	44
Jaime Azcárraga; Federico Fernández; Alberto Michán; Nicolás Pizarro	See above	Team	—N/a								10	9	Did not advance			10	9

== Fencing ==
Men

Athlete	Event	Round of 64	Round of 32	Round of 16	Quarterfinal	Semifinal	Final / BM	
Athlete	Event	Opposition Score	Opposition Score	Opposition Score	Opposition Score	Opposition Score	Opposition Score	Rank
Daniel Gómez	Individual foil	Jovanović (CRO); W 15–14	Ma Jf (CHN); L 9–15	Did not advance				

Women

Athlete	Event	Round of 32	Round of 16	Quarterfinal	Semifinal	Final / BM	
Athlete	Event	Opposition Score	Opposition Score	Opposition Score	Opposition Score	Opposition Score	Rank
Úrsula González	Individual sabre	Kim J-y (KOR); L 3–15	Did not advance				

== Football ==
=== Men's tournament ===
Roster

The following is the Mexico squad in the men's football tournament of the 2012 Summer Olympics.

Coach: Luis Fernando Tena

No.	Pos.	Player	Date of birth (age)	Caps	Goals	2012 club
1	GK	José de Jesús Corona* (c)	26 January 1981 (aged 31)	12	0	(Mexican Football Federation) Cruz Azul
2	DF	Israel Jiménez	13 June 1989 (aged 23)	7	1	(Mexican Football Federation) UANL
3	DF	Carlos Salcido*	2 April 1980 (aged 32)	0	0	(Mexican Football Federation) UANL
4	DF	Hiram Mier	25 August 1989 (aged 22)	14	1	(Mexican Football Federation) Monterrey
5	DF	Dárvin Chávez	21 November 1989 (aged 22)	15	0	(Mexican Football Federation) Monterrey
6	MF	Héctor Herrera	19 April 1990 (aged 22)	11	1	(Mexican Football Federation) Pachuca
7	MF	Javier Cortés	20 July 1989 (aged 23)	11	1	(Mexican Football Federation) UNAM
8	MF	Marco Fabián	21 July 1989 (aged 23)	12	12	(Mexican Football Federation) Guadalajara
9	FW	Oribe Peralta*	12 January 1984 (aged 28)	5	6	(Mexican Football Federation) Santos Laguna
10	FW	Giovani dos Santos	11 May 1989 (aged 23)	0	0	(The Football Association) Tottenham Hotspur
11	MF	Javier Aquino	11 February 1990 (aged 22)	17	0	(Mexican Football Federation) Cruz Azul
12	FW	Raúl Jiménez	5 May 1991 (aged 21)	5	1	(Mexican Football Federation) América
13	DF	Diego Reyes	19 September 1992 (aged 19)	12	1	(Mexican Football Federation) América
14	MF	Jorge Enríquez	8 January 1991 (aged 21)	17	1	(Mexican Football Federation) Guadalajara
15	DF	Néstor Vidrio	22 March 1989 (aged 23)	5	0	(Mexican Football Federation) Pachuca
16	DF	Miguel Ponce	12 April 1989 (aged 23)	13	5	(Mexican Football Federation) Guadalajara
17	DF	Néstor Araujo	29 August 1991 (aged 20)	9	0	(Mexican Football Federation) Cruz Azul
18	GK	José Antonio Rodríguez	4 July 1992 (aged 20)	4	0	(Mexican Football Federation) Guadalajara

* Over-aged player.

Group play

Pos	Team	Pld	W	D	L	GF	GA	GD	Pts	Qualification
1	Mexico	3	2	1	0	3	0	+3	7	Advance to knockout stage
2	South Korea	3	1	2	0	2	1	+1	5	Advance to knockout stage
3	Gabon	3	0	2	1	1	3	−2	2	
4	Switzerland	3	0	1	2	2	4	−2	1	

Source: FIFA
Rules for classification: Group stage tiebreakers
26 July 2012
14:30

Mexico	0–0	South Korea
	Report

St James' Park, Newcastle
Attendance: 15,748
Referee: Slim Jedidi (Tunisia)

29 July 2012
14:30

Mexico	2–0	Gabon
Dos Santos 63', 90+2' (pen.)	Report

Ricoh Arena, Coventry
Attendance: 28,171
Referee: Ben Williams (Australia)

1 August 2012
17:00

Mexico	1–0	Switzerland
Peralta 69'	Report

Millennium Stadium, Cardiff
Attendance: 50,000
Referee: Ravshan Irmatov (Uzbekistan)

Quarter-final

4 August 2012
14:30

Mexico	4–2 (a.e.t.)	Senegal
Enríquez 10'; Aquino 62'; Dos Santos 98'; Herrera 109'	Report	Konaté 69'; Baldé 76'

Wembley Stadium, London
Attendance: 81,855
Referee: Mark Clattenburg (Great Britain)

Semi-final

7 August 2012
17:00

Mexico	3–1	Japan
Fabián 31'; Peralta 65'; Cortés 90+3'	Report	Ōtsu 12'

Wembley Stadium, London
Attendance: 82,372
Referee: Gianluca Rocchi (Italy)

Gold medal match

11 August 2012
15:00

Brazil	1–2	Mexico
Hulk 90+1'	Report 1 Report 2	Peralta 1', 75'

Wembley Stadium, London
Attendance: 86,162
Referee: Mark Clattenburg (Great Britain)

Final rank
Gold

== Gymnastics ==
=== Artistic ===
Men

Athlete	Event	Qualification								Final							
Athlete	Event	Apparatus						Total	Rank	Apparatus						Total	Rank
Athlete	Event	F	PH	R	V	PB	HB	Total	Rank	F	PH	R	V	PB	HB	Total	Rank
Daniel Corral	Pommel horse	—N/a	12.333	—N/a				12.333	61	Did not advance							
Daniel Corral	Parallel bars	—N/a				15.433	—N/a	15.433	8 Q	—N/a				15.333	—N/a	15.333	5

Women

Athlete	Event	Qualification						Final					
Athlete	Event	Apparatus				Total	Rank	Apparatus				Total	Rank
Athlete	Event	F	V	UB	BB	Total	Rank	F	V	UB	BB	Total	Rank
Elsa García	Floor	13.733	—N/a			13.733	35	Did not advance					
Elsa García	Balance beam	—N/a		12.400	—N/a	12.400	58	Did not advance					

== Judo ==
Athlete	Event	Round of 64	Round of 32	Round of 16	Quarterfinals	Semifinals	Repechage	Final / BM	
Athlete	Event	Opposition Result	Opposition Result	Opposition Result	Opposition Result	Opposition Result	Opposition Result	Opposition Result	Rank
Nabor Castillo	Men's −60 kg	Bye	Khom (CAM); W 0100–0000	Verde (ITA); L 0011–1011	Did not advance				
Vanessa Zambotti	Women's +78 kg	—N/a	Tong W (CHN); L 0000–0100	Did not advance					

== Modern pentathlon ==
Athlete	Event	Fencing (épée one touch)			Swimming (200 m freestyle)			Riding (show jumping)			Combined: shooting/running (10 m air pistol/3000 m)			Total points	Final rank
Athlete	Event	Results	Rank	MP points	Time	Rank	MP points	Penalties	Rank	MP points	Time	Rank	MP points	Total points	Final rank
Óscar Soto	Men's	16–19	20	784	2:10.98	29	1232	24	6	1176	10:34.42	7	2464	5656	14
Tamara Vega	Women's	16–19	=22	784	2:18.72	19	1136	740*	35	460	Did not finish			2380	36

* Did not finish

== Rowing ==
Men

Athlete	Event	Heats		Repechage		Quarterfinals		Semifinals		Final	
Athlete	Event	Time	Rank	Time	Rank	Time	Rank	Time	Rank	Time	Rank
Patrick Loliger	Single sculls	6:51.78	3 QF	Bye		7:00.20	4 SC/D	7:29.82	2 FC	7:20.10	14

Women

Athlete	Event	Heats		Repechage		Quarterfinals		Semifinals		Final	
Athlete	Event	Time	Rank	Time	Rank	Time	Rank	Time	Rank	Time	Rank
Debora Oakley	Single sculls	8:00.17	4 QF	Bye		8:10.97	4 SC/D	8:14.03	5 FD	8:40.70	22

Qualification Legend: FA=Final A (medal); FB=Final B (non-medal); FC=Final C (non-medal); FD=Final D (non-medal); FE=Final E (non-medal); FF=Final F (non-medal); SA/B=Semifinals A/B; SC/D=Semifinals C/D; SE/F=Semifinals E/F; QF=Quarterfinals; R=Repechage

== Sailing ==
Men

Athlete	Event	Race											Net points	Final rank
Athlete	Event	1	2	3	4	5	6	7	8	9	10	M*	Net points	Final rank
David Mier	RS:X	32	27	30	~~35~~	28	27	28	32	30	20	EL	254	32
Ricardo Montemayor	Laser	39	41	44	~~46~~	46	29	30	40	11	42	EL	320	38

Women

Athlete	Event	Race											Net points	Final rank
Athlete	Event	1	2	3	4	5	6	7	8	9	10	M*	Net points	Final rank
Tania Elías Calles	Laser Radial	12	9	6	19	13	~~32~~	11	5	13	10	8	116	10

M = Medal race; EL = Eliminated – did not advance into the medal race;

== Shooting ==
Men

Athlete	Event	Qualification		Final	
Athlete	Event	Points	Rank	Points	Rank
Javier Rodríguez	Skeet	114	24	Did not advance	

Women

Athlete	Event	Qualification		Final	
Athlete	Event	Points	Rank	Points	Rank
Alexis Martínez	50 m rifle 3 positions	572	39	Did not advance	
Rosa Peña Rocamontes	10 m air rifle	392	35	Did not advance	
Alejandra Zavala	10 m air pistol	380	19	Did not advance	

== Swimming ==
Men

Athlete	Event	Heat		Semifinal		Final	
Athlete	Event	Time	Rank	Time	Rank	Time	Rank
Arturo Pérez Vertti	1500 m freestyle	15:25.91	22	—N/a		Did not advance	
Christian Schurr	200 m breaststroke	2:14.16	26	Did not advance			

Women

Athlete	Event	Heat		Semifinal		Final	
Athlete	Event	Time	Rank	Time	Rank	Time	Rank
Patricia Castañeda	800 m freestyle	8:44.44	27	—N/a		Did not advance	
Erica Dittmer	200 m individual medley	2:16.54	27	Did not advance			
Susana Escobar	400 m freestyle	4:14.78	28	—N/a		Did not advance	
Susana Escobar	400 m individual medley	4:50.57	29	—N/a		Did not advance	
Fernanda González	100 m backstroke	1:01.28	23	Did not advance			
Fernanda González	200 m backstroke	2:12.75	24	Did not advance			
Liliana Ibáñez	100 m freestyle	55.71	25	Did not advance			
Liliana Ibáñez	200 m freestyle	2:01.36	25	Did not advance			
Rita Medrano	200 m butterfly	2:11.42	23	Did not advance			
Lizeth Rueda	10 km open water	—N/a				2:02:46.1	21

== Synchronized swimming ==
Athlete	Event	Technical routine		Free routine (preliminary)			Free routine (final)		
Athlete	Event	Points	Rank	Points	Total (technical + free)	Rank	Points	Total (technical + free)	Rank
Nuria Diosdado; Isabel Delgado	Duet	83.000	18	83.610	166.610	18	Did not advance		

== Table tennis ==
Athlete	Event	Preliminary round	Round 1	Round 2	Round 3	Round 4	Quarterfinals	Semifinals	Final / BM	
Athlete	Event	Opposition Result	Opposition Result	Opposition Result	Opposition Result	Opposition Result	Opposition Result	Opposition Result	Opposition Result	Rank
Yadira Silva	Women's singles	Bye	Hsing (USA); L 0–4	Did not advance						

== Taekwondo ==
Athlete	Event	Round of 16	Quarterfinals	Semifinals	Repechage	Bronze Medal	Final	
Athlete	Event	Opposition Result	Opposition Result	Opposition Result	Opposition Result	Opposition Result	Opposition Result	Rank
Diego García	Men's −58 kg	Khalil (AUS); L 4–9	Did not advance					
Erick Osornio	Men's −68 kg	Stamper (GBR); L 2–5	Did not advance					
Jannet Alegría	Women's −49 kg	Hatahet (JOR); W 12–1	Yagüe (ESP); L 0–8	Did not advance	Carstens (PAN); W 7–2	Zaninović (CRO); L 5–6	Did not advance	5
María Espinoza	Women's +67 kg	Sorn (CAM); W 3–2	Mandić (SRB); L 6–4	Did not advance	Crawley (SAM); W 13–0	Hernández (CUB); W 4–2	Did not advance	3rd place, bronze medalist(s)

== Triathlon ==
Athlete	Event	Swim (1.5 km)	Trans 1	Bike (40 km)	Trans 2	Run (10 km)	Total Time	Rank
Crisanto Grajales	Men's	18:10	0:38	59:36	0:33	31:11	1:50:08	28
Claudia Rivas	Women's	18:29	0:43	1:06:26	0:33	36:27	2:02:38	21

== Weightlifting ==
Athlete	Event	Snatch		Clean & Jerk		Total	Rank
Athlete	Event	Result	Rank	Result	Rank	Total	Rank
Lino Montes	Men's −56 kg	112	15	157	5	269	6
Luz Acosta	Women's −63 kg	99	6	125	5	224	3rd place, bronze medalist(s)

== Wrestling ==
Key:

- VT – Victory by Fall.
- PP – Decision by Points – the loser with technical points.
- PO – Decision by Points – the loser without technical points.

Men's freestyle

Athlete	Event	Qualification	Round of 16	Quarterfinal	Semifinal	Repechage 1	Repechage 2	Final / BM	
Athlete	Event	Opposition Result	Opposition Result	Opposition Result	Opposition Result	Opposition Result	Opposition Result	Opposition Result	Rank
Guillermo Torres	−60 kg	Esmaeilpour (IRI); L 1–3 ^{PP}	Did not advance						16
Jesse Ruíz	−120 kg	Bye	Modzmanashvili (GEO); L 0–5 ^{VT}	Did not advance		Bye	Shabanbay (KAZ); L 0–5 ^{VT}	Did not advance	18

== See also ==
- Mexico at the 2011 Pan American Games
- Mexico at the 2012 Winter Youth Olympics
