= Archery at the 2012 Summer Olympics – Men's individual =

Men's individual at the Games of the XXX Olympiad
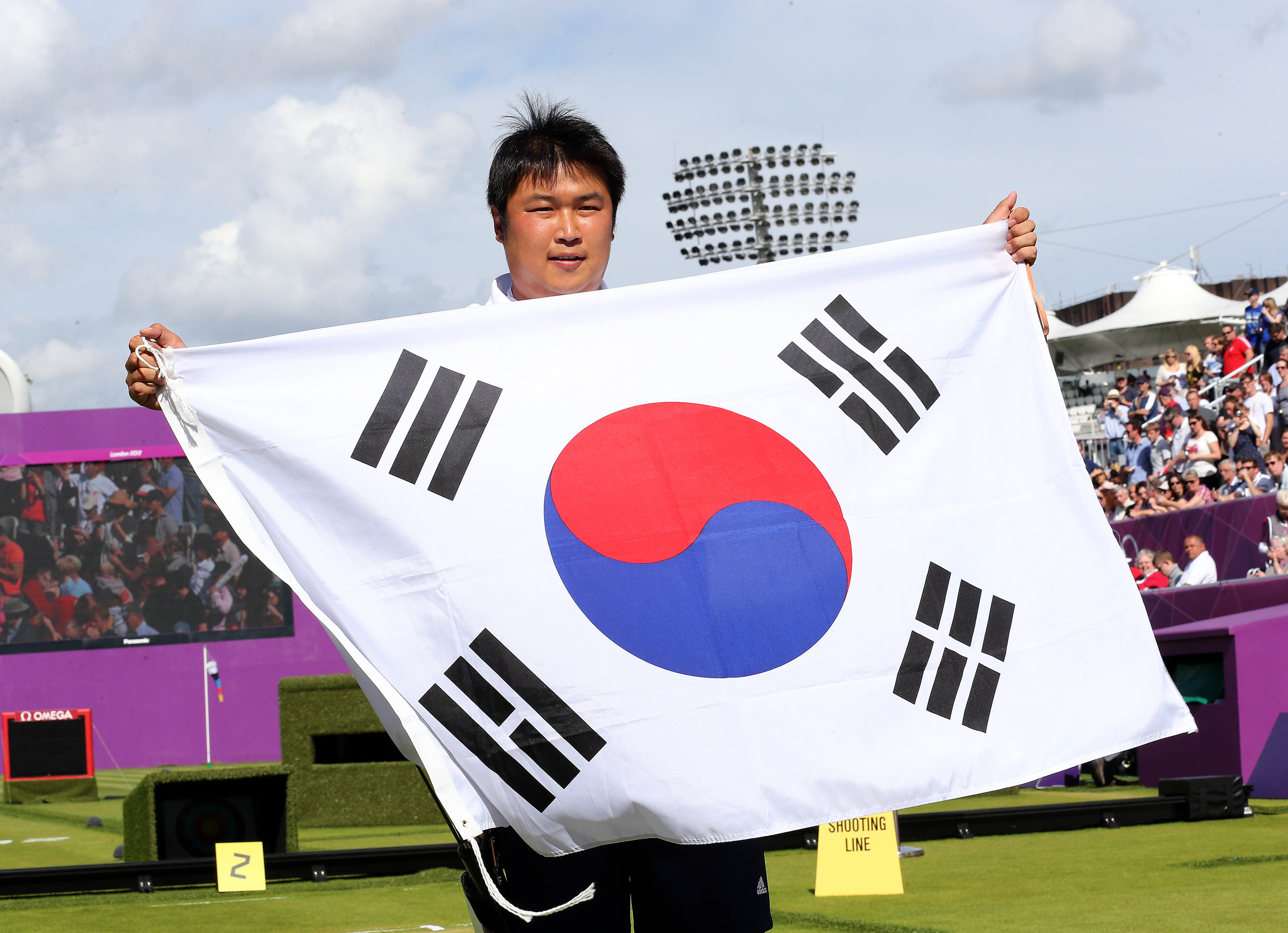
- Gold medallist Oh Jin-hyek holds the flag of South Korea following his victory
- Venue: Lord's Cricket Ground
- Dates: 27 July – 3 August 2012
- Competitors: 64 from 40 nations

Medalists
1st place, gold medalist(s)		Oh Jin-hyek	South Korea
2nd place, silver medalist(s)		Takaharu Furukawa	Japan
3rd place, bronze medalist(s)		Dai Xiaoxiang	China

The men's individual archery competition at the 2012 Olympic Games in London was held from 27 July to 3 August at Lord's Cricket Ground.

Oh Jin-Hyek of South Korea won the gold medal, followed by Takaharu Furukawa from Japan with silver and Dai Xiaoxiang, representing China, with the bronze.

== Competition format ==
The competitors were ranked 1st to 64th based on their ranking round results and seeded into a head-to-head knockout bracket based on this ranking. The 2012 Olympics introduced a new format for the knockout rounds. Each head-to-head match was a best-of-five sets match where each competitor shot three arrows per set. Competitors received two points for winning the set and one point for a draw, with the first competitor to reach six points winning the match. The winner advanced to the next round while the loser was eliminated from the competition.

== Schedule ==
All times are British Summer Time (UTC+1).

Date	Time	Round
Friday, 27 July 2012	09:00–11:00	Ranking round
Monday, 30 July 2012; Tuesday, 31 July 2012; Wednesday, 1 August 2012	09:00–12:55; 15:00–17:40	Round of 64, Round of 32
Friday, 3 August 2012	09:00–10:45	Round of 16
Friday, 3 August 2012	14:00–14:52	Quarter-finals
Friday, 3 August 2012	14:52–15:05	Semi-finals
Friday, 3 August 2012	15:21–15:50	Finals

== Records ==
Prior to this competition, the existing world and Olympic records were as follows. Im Dong-Hyun broke both records.

- 72 arrow ranking round

World record	Im Dong-Hyun (KOR)	696	Antalya, Turkey	2 May 2012
Olympic record	Michele Frangilli (ITA)	684	Atlanta, United States	28 July 1996

NB: Im Dong-Hyun broke the world record at the 2004 Olympics with a score of 687. It was not recognized by the International Olympic Committee as an Olympic record because the ranking round took place on 12 August, before the 2004 opening ceremony. Im's 2012 ranking round score is recognized as an Olympic record, despite having been shot before the opening ceremony.

== Results ==
=== Ranking round ===
Rank	Archer	Nation	Score	10s	Xs
1	Im Dong-Hyun	South Korea	699 (WR)	51	22
2	Kim Bub-Min	South Korea	698	50	26
3	Oh Jin-Hyek	South Korea	690	45	27
4	Larry Godfrey	Great Britain	680	36	9
5	Takaharu Furukawa	Japan	679	37	10
6	Gaël Prevost	France	679	32	13
7	Dai Xiaoxiang	China	678	35	12
8	Crispin Duenas	Canada	678	35	11
9	Romain Girouille	France	677	34	12
10	Brady Ellison	United States	676	33	16
11	Mauro Nespoli	Italy	674	33	14
12	Jacob Wukie	United States	673	33	11
13	Xing Yu	China	673	32	13
14	Rafał Dobrowolski	Poland	672	33	13
15	Yu Ishizu	Japan	671	35	8
16	Rick van der Ven	Netherlands	671	27	14
17	Denis Gankin	Kazakhstan	670	34	12
18	Jake Kaminski	United States	670	33	9
19	Jantsangiin Gantögs	Mongolia	669	31	14
20	Khairul Anuar Mohamad	Malaysia	669	30	10
21	Bård Nesteng	Norway	669	27	6
22	Liu Zhaowu	China	668	33	12
23	Taylor Worth	Australia	668	28	12
24	Markiyan Ivashko	Ukraine	667	34	12
25	Elías Malavé	Venezuela	666	33	9
26	Eduardo Vélez	Mexico	665	31	13
27	Thomas Faucheron	France	665	29	11
28	Dmytro Hrachov	Ukraine	665	28	11
29	Juan René Serrano	Mexico	665	28	7
30	Luis Álvarez	Mexico	665	26	8
31	Tarundeep Rai	India	664	29	12
32	Daniel Pineda	Colombia	664	29	10
33	Wang Cheng-pang	Chinese Taipei	663	31	12
34	Juan Carlos Stevens	Cuba	663	28	7
35	Yavor Hristov	Bulgaria	663	26	10
36	Marco Galiazzo	Italy	662	28	8
37	Michele Frangilli	Italy	662	28	8
38	Witthaya Thamwong	Thailand	662	26	7
39	Milad Vaziri	Iran	662	23	6
40	Kuo Cheng-wei	Chinese Taipei	660	31	10
41	Elías Cuesta	Spain	660	29	5
42	Alan Wills	Great Britain	660	29	3
43	Viktor Ruban	Ukraine	660	26	10
44	Hideki Kikuchi	Japan	659	27	10
45	Cheng Chu Sian	Malaysia	658	26	7
46	Rahul Banerjee	India	655	20	8
47	Dan Olaru	Moldova	654	27	3
48	Haziq Kamaruddin	Malaysia	654	23	11
49	Jeff Henckels	Luxembourg	654	22	10
50	Simon Terry	Great Britain	654	21	8
51	Daniel Xavier	Brazil	653	25	7
52	Camilo Mayr	Germany	653	24	9
53	Jayanta Talukdar	India	650	22	6
54	Chen Yu-Cheng	Chinese Taipei	649	23	7
55	Mark Javier	Philippines	649	22	7
56	Nay Myo Aung	Myanmar	646	19	7
57	Ahmed El-Nemr	Egypt	644	21	6
58	Klemen Štrajhar	Slovenia	639	21	8
59	Philippe Kouassi	Ivory Coast	638	19	7
60	Lee Kar Wai	Hong Kong	637	20	7
61	Mohammed Milon	Bangladesh	636	21	7
62	Axel Müller	Switzerland	633	18	5
63	Rob Elder	Fiji	615	12	4
64	Emanuele Guidi	San Marino	589	10	5

=== Competition bracket ===
==== Section 1 ====
Round of 64
1	D-H Im (KOR)	6	27	30	26
64	E Guidi (SMR)	0	26	24	24
32	DF Pineda (COL)	0	24	24	24
33	C-p Wang (TPE)	6	25	28	26
16	R van der Ven (NED)	6	28	28	26	25
49	J Henckels (LUX)	2	25	28	25	25
17	D Gankin (KAZ)	6	27	28	28	25	26
48	H Kamaruddin (MAS)	4	29	27	27	27	25
8	C Duenas (CAN)	2	29	25	25	24
57	A El-Nemr (EGY)	6	24	30	28	26
25	E Malavé (VEN)	5^{10}	29	23	26	28	27
40	C-w Kuo (TPE)	6^{10+}	25	26	28	28	26
9	R Girouille (FRA)	6^{9}	23	28	26	28	27
56	NM Aung (MYA)	6^{9+}	24	26	27	28	21
24	M Ivashko (UKR)	6	26	29	27	30	28
41	E Cuesta (ESP)	4	27	24	27	29	28

Round of 32
1	D-H Im (KOR)	6	28	26	27	24	28
33	C-p Wang (TPE)	4	28	25	25	25	28
16	R van der Ven (NED)	7	29	28	27	27
17	D Gankin (KAZ)	1	28	28	26	23
57	A El-Nemr (EGY)	2	27	25	27	23
40	C-w Kuo (TPE)	6	25	28	30	28
56	NM Aung (MYA)	1	23	28	25	25
24	M Ivashko (UKR)	7	29	28	26	29

Round of 16
1	D-H Im (KOR)	1	26	27	26	27
16	R van der Ven (NED)	7	29	27	27	29
40	C-w Kuo (TPE)	6	27	28	28
24	M Ivashko (UKR)	0	25	26	27

Quarter-finals
16	R van der Ven (NED)	6	27	30	29
40	C-w Kuo (TPE)	0	24	27	28

==== Section 2 ====
Round of 64
4	L Godfrey (GBR)	6	29	27	28
61	M Milon (BAN)	0	26	18	19
29	JR Serrano (MEX)	6	25	27	24	26
36	M Galiazzo (ITA)	2	24	25	30	25
13	Y Xing (CHN)	6	29	29	29
52	C Mayr (GER)	0	27	27	26
20	K Mohamad (MAS)	6	29	27	25	29	30
45	C Sian (MAS)	4	26	28	27	27	29
5	T Furukawa (JPN)	6	26	26	28	29	29
60	K Lee (HKG)	4	27	27	25	27	27
28	D Hrachov (UKR)	7	28	28	26	27	27
37	M Frangilli (ITA)	3	26	24	27	27	26
12	J Wukie (USA)	6	27	30	29
53	J Talukdar (IND)	0	22	26	28
21	B Nesteng (NOR)	6^{8+}	24	27	28	26	28
44	H Kikuchi (JPN)	5^{8}	26	27	26	27	27

Round of 32
4	L Godfrey (GBR)	7	26	29	27	29
29	JR Serrano (MEX)	1	25	29	26	28
13	Y Xing (CHN)	5^{9}	30	29	27	27	28
20	K Mohamad (MAS)	6^{9+}	28	29	28	28	26
5	T Furukawa (JPN)	6	28	28	27	29	29
28	D Hrachov (UKR)	4	29	27	29	27	26
12	J Wukie (USA)	2	28	28	27	26
21	B Nesteng (NOR)	6	24	29	29	29

Round of 16
4	L Godfrey (GBR)	5^{9}	25	28	29	28	26
20	K Mohamad (MAS)	6^{10}	27	28	27	26	28
5	T Furukawa (JPN)	6	28	28	25	27
21	B Nesteng (NOR)	2	26	25	26	21

Quarter-finals
20	K Mohamad (MAS)	2	26	24	28	26
5	T Furukawa (JPN)	6	27	25	21	28

==== Section 3 ====
Round of 64
3	J-H Oh (KOR)	6	29	27	28
62	A Müller (SUI)	0	25	26	24
30	L Álvarez (MEX)	6	28	27	29
35	Y Hristov (BUL)	0	23	26	28
19	J Gantögs (MGL)	0	27	24	25
46	R Banerjee (IND)	6	29	25	30
14	R Dobrowolski (POL)	7	23	29	28	28	27
51	D Xavier (BRA)	3	27	24	26	28	26
6	G Prevost (FRA)	6	23	26	26	26	29
59	P Kouassi (CIV)	4	25	24	26	26	23
27	T Faucheron (FRA)	6	28	27	26
38	W Thamwong (THA)	0	26	23	25
22	Z Liu (CHN)	5^{9}	27	28	26	27	26
43	V Ruban (UKR)	6^{10}	30	28	26	27	25
11	M Nespoli (ITA)	2	27	27	28	26
54	Y-C Chen (TPE)	6	28	28	26	28

Round of 32
3	J-H Oh (KOR)	6	28	29	26	28	28
30	L Álvarez (MEX)	4	28	27	30	27	28
46	R Banerjee (IND)	3	28	25	29	26	25
14	R Dobrowolski (POL)	7	28	27	26	29	26
6	G Prevost (FRA)	7	28	27	25	28	29
27	T Faucheron (FRA)	3	30	25	21	28	25
43	V Ruban (UKR)	6	29	26	29
54	Y-C Chen (TPE)	0	27	25	25

Round of 16
3	J-H Oh (KOR)	6	28	28	28
14	R Dobrowolski (POL)	0	27	23	26
6	G Prevost (FRA)	4	27	27	27	28	25
43	V Ruban (UKR)	6	28	26	29	27	26

Quarter-finals
3	J-H Oh (KOR)	7	29	27	29	28
43	V Ruban (UKR)	1	24	27	27	25

==== Section 4 ====
Round of 64
7	X Dai (CHN)	6	28	29	28
58	K Štrajhar (SLO)	0	25	25	25
26	E Vélez (MEX)	7	25	28	29	29
39	M Vaziri (IRI)	1	25	26	28	26
23	T Worth (AUS)	6^{10}	28	26	26	26	25
42	A Wills (GBR)	5^{9}	25	28	24	26	27
10	B Ellison (USA)	7	29	28	25	29
55	M Javier (PHI)	1	27	25	25	22
15	Y Ishizu (JPN)	1	25	26	28	24
50	S Terry (GBR)	7	26	26	30	25
18	J Kaminski (USA)	5^{7}	27	29	28	24	23
47	D Olaru (MDA)	6^{9}	25	26	28	28	27
31	T Rai (IND)	6^{9}	27	27	27	28	27
34	JC Stevens (CUB)	5^{8}	28	27	28	27	26
2	B-M Kim (KOR)	6	26	29	27	26	26
63	R Elder (FIJ)	4	24	28	29	27	23

Round of 32
7	X Dai (CHN)	6	27	27	28
26	E Vélez (MEX)	0	26	25	25
23	T Worth (AUS)	7	29	27	29	27
10	B Ellison (USA)	1	29	25	26	26
50	S Terry (GBR)	1	25	25	28	24
47	D Olaru (MDA)	7	28	27	28	27
31	T Rai (IND)	2	26	28	28	26
2	B-M Kim (KOR)	6	27	30	25	28

Round of 16
7	X Dai (CHN)	6^{9}	25	28	28	28	28
23	T Worth (AUS)	5^{8}	28	25	28	29	27
47	D Olaru (MDA)	1	26	26	26	26
2	B-M Kim (KOR)	7	28	28	26	28

Quarter-finals
7	X Dai (CHN)	6^{9+}	30	28	26	28	28
2	B-M Kim (KOR)	5^{9}	26	28	27	29	27

==== Finals ====
Semi-finals
16	Rick van der Ven (NED)	5^{9}	28	30	27	30	26
5	Takaharu Furukawa (JPN)	6^{10}	28	27	29	28	28
3	Oh Jin-Hyek (KOR)	6^{9}	27	28	27	26	29
7	Dai Xiaoxiang (CHN)	5^{8}	29	27	27	28	27

Gold medal match
5	Takaharu Furukawa (JPN)	1	26	28	29	25
3	Oh Jin-Hyek (KOR)	7	29	29	29	28
Bronze medal match
16	Rick van der Ven (NED)	5^{8}	30	29	27	25	26
7	Dai Xiaoxiang (CHN)	6^{10}	26	28	28	28	26
