= Chinese Taipei at the 2012 Summer Olympics =

- Chinese Taipei Olympic flag
- IOC code: TPE
- NOC: Chinese Taipei Olympic Committee
- Website: www.tpenoc.net (in Chinese and English)

in London
- Competitors: 44 in 14 sports
- Flag bearers: Chen Shih-chieh (opening); Tseng Li-cheng (closing)
- Medals Ranked 49th: Gold 1 Silver 0 Bronze 1 Total 2

Summer Olympics appearances (overview)
- 1956; 1960; 1964; 1968; 1972; 1976–1980; 1984; 1988; 1992; 1996; 2000; 2004; 2008; 2012; 2016; 2020; 2024

Other related appearances
- Republic of China (1924–1948)

Chinese Taipei competed at the 2012 Summer Olympics in London, from 27 July to 12 August 2012. "Chinese Taipei" was the designated name used by Taiwan to participate in some international organizations and almost all sporting events, including the Olympic Games. Neither the common name "Taiwan" nor the official name "Republic of China" would be used due primarily to opposition from the People's Republic of China. This was the nation's eighth consecutive appearance at the Olympics.

With the absence of baseball and softball at the Olympics, the Chinese Taipei Olympic Committee sent the nation's smallest delegation to the Games since 1992. A total of 44 athletes, 19 men and 25 women, competed in 14 sports. For the second time in its Olympic history, Chinese Taipei was represented by more female than male athletes. There was only a single competitor in fencing, judo, rowing, and sailing. This was also the youngest delegation in Chinese Taipei's Olympic history, with more than half under the age of 25, and many of them were expected to reach their peak in time for the 2016 Summer Olympics in Rio de Janeiro. Fourteen athletes had competed in Beijing, including taekwondo jin and fourth-placer Yang Shu-Chun. Four Chinese Taipei athletes made their third consecutive Olympic appearance: table tennis players Chuang Chih-Yuan and Huang Yi-Hua, and badminton players Cheng Wen-Hsing and Chien Yu-Chin in the women's doubles. Weightlifter Chen Shih-chieh, who competed at his first Olympics, was the nation's flag bearer at the opening ceremony.

Chinese Taipei left London with two medals: a gold and a bronze, the lowest in Summer Olympic history since 1996. These medals were awarded to the female athletes in weightlifting and taekwondo.

== Medalists ==
Medal	Name	Sport	Event	Date
Gold	Hsu Shu-ching	Weightlifting	Women's 53 kg	29 July
Bronze	Tseng Li-cheng	Taekwondo	Women's 57 kg	9 August

== Archery ==
Chinese Taipei has qualified three archers for the men's individual event, a team for the men's team event, three archers for the women's individual event, and a team for the women's team event

Men

Athlete	Event	Ranking round		Round of 64	Round of 32	Round of 16	Quarterfinals	Semifinals	Final / BM	
Athlete	Event	Score	Seed	Opposition Score	Opposition Score	Opposition Score	Opposition Score	Opposition Score	Opposition Score	Rank
Chen Yu-chen	Individual	649	54	Nespoli (ITA) (11); W 6–2	Ruban (UKR) (43); L 0–6	Did not advance				
Kuo Cheng-wei	Individual	660	40	Malavé (VEN) (25); W 6–5	El-Nemr (EGY) (57); W 6–2	Ivashko (UKR) (24); W 6–0	van der Ven (NED) (16); L 0–6	Did not advance		
Wang Cheng-pang	Individual	663	33	Pineda (COL) (32); W 6–0	Im D-h (KOR) (1); L 4–6	Did not advance				
Chen Yu-chen; Kuo Cheng-wei; Wang Cheng-pang	Team	1972	11	—		Italy (6); L 206–212	Did not advance			

Women

Athlete	Event	Ranking round		Round of 64	Round of 32	Round of 16	Quarterfinals	Semifinals	Final / BM	
Athlete	Event	Score	Seed	Opposition Score	Opposition Score	Opposition Score	Opposition Score	Opposition Score	Opposition Score	Rank
Le Chien-ying	Individual	638	39	Löklüoğlu (TUR) (25); W 6–0	Christiansen (DEN) (7); L 4–6	Did not advance				
Lin Chia-en	Individual	667	5	Hashim (MAS) (60); W 6–2	Schuh (FRA) (37); L 5–6	Did not advance				
Tan Ya-ting	Individual	671	3	Dielen (SUI) (25); W 6–4	Richter (GER) (30); W 6–2	Lionetti (ITA) (19); L 2–6	Did not advance			
Le Chien-ying; Lin Chia-en; Tan Ya-ting	Team	1976	3	—		Bye	Russia (6); L 216 (26)–216 (28)	Did not advance		

== Athletics ==
Athletes from Chinese Taipei have so far achieved qualifying standards in the following athletics events (up to a maximum of 3 athletes in each event at the 'A' Standard, and 1 at the 'B' Standard):

Key

- Note–Ranks given for track events are within the athlete's heat only
- Q = Qualified for the next round
- q = Qualified for the next round as a fastest loser or, in field events, by position without achieving the qualifying target
- NR = National record
- N/A = Round not applicable for the event
- Bye = Athlete not required to compete in round

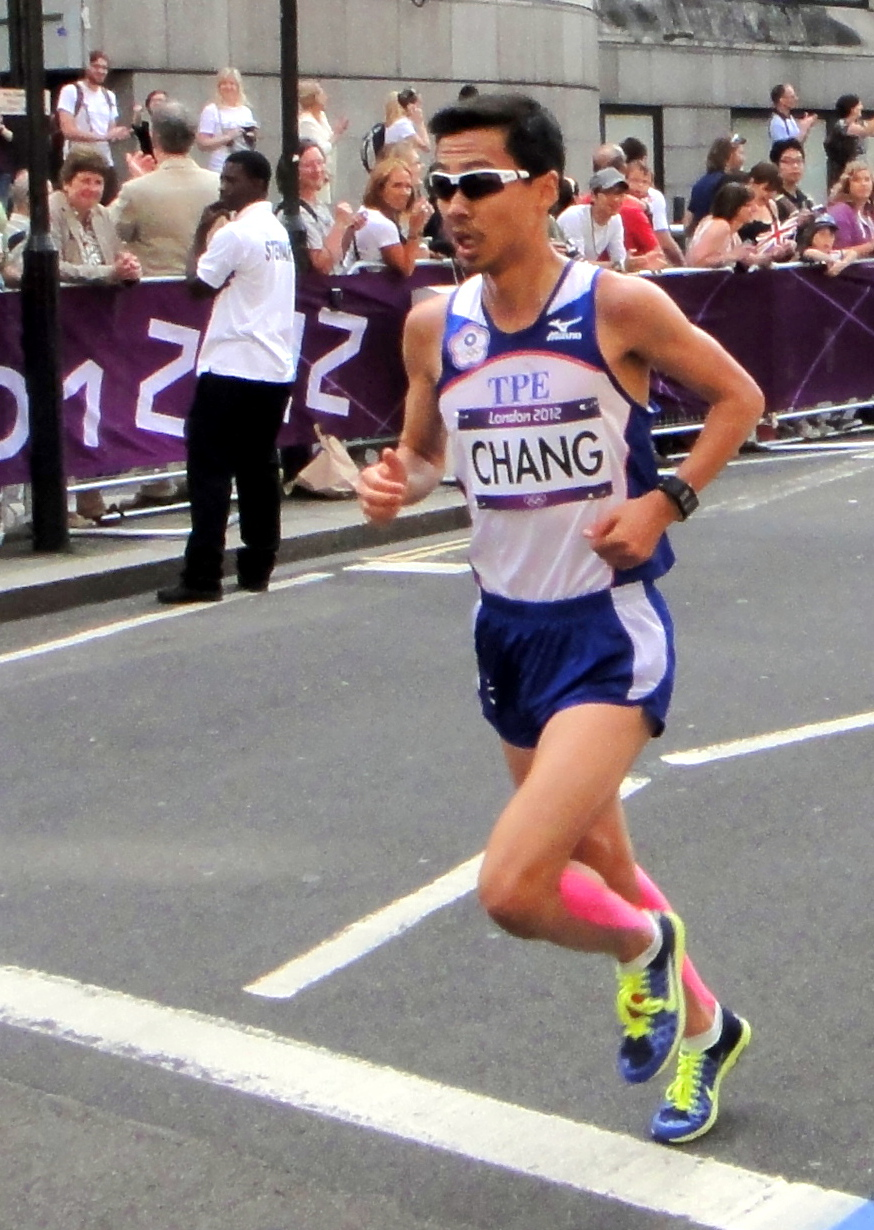
Chang Chia-che finished seventy-seventh in men's marathon.

Men
Track & road events

Athlete	Event	Heat		Semifinal		Final	
Athlete	Event	Result	Rank	Result	Rank	Result	Rank
Chang Chia-che	Marathon	—				2:29:58	77
Chen Chieh	400 m hurdles	50.27	6	Did not advance			

Field events

Athlete	Event	Qualification		Final	
Athlete	Event	Distance	Position	Distance	Position
Chang Ming-huang	Shot put	20.25	12 q	19.99	12
Lin Ching-hsuan	Long jump	7.38	=33	Did not advance	

Women
Field events

Athlete	Event	Qualification		Final	
Athlete	Event	Distance	Position	Distance	Position
Li Wen-hua	Discus throw	59.91	22	Did not advance	
Lin Chia-ying	Shot put	17.43 NR	25	Did not advance	

== Badminton ==
Men

Athlete	Event	Group Stage				Round of 16	Quarterfinal	Semifinal	Final / BM	
Athlete	Event	Opposition Score	Opposition Score	Opposition Score	Rank	Opposition Score	Opposition Score	Opposition Score	Opposition Score	Rank
Hsu Jen-hao	Singles	Son W-h (KOR); L 14–21, 10–21	Ivanov (RUS); L 15–21, 13–21	—	3	Did not advance				
Fang Chieh-min; Lee Sheng-mu	Doubles	Cai Y / Fu Hf (CHN); L 19–21, 13–21	Kindervater / Schöttler (GER); W 21–15, 21–16	Smith / Warfe (AUS); W 21–14, 21–13	2 Q	—	Boe / Mogensen (DEN); L 16–21, 18–21	Did not advance		

Women

Athlete	Event	Group Stage				Round of 16	Quarterfinal	Semifinal	Final / BM	
Athlete	Event	Opposition Score	Opposition Score	Opposition Score	Rank	Opposition Score	Opposition Score	Opposition Score	Opposition Score	Rank
Cheng Shao-chieh	Singles	Yiğit (TUR); W 21–10, 21–6	Prutsch (AUT); W 21–11, 21–9	—	1 Q	Gu J (SIN); W 21–18, 21–10	Wang Yh (CHN); L 14–21, 11–21	Did not advance		
Tai Tzu-ying	Singles	Nieminen (FIN); W 21–11, 21–14	Montero (MEX); W 21–6, 21–10	—	1 Q	Li Xr (CHN); L 16–21, 21–23	Did not advance			
Cheng Wen-hsing; Chien Yu-chin	Doubles	Fujii / Kakiiwa (JPN); W 21–19, 21–11	Gutta / Ponnappa (IND); L 23–25, 21–16, 18–21	Sari / Yao (SIN); W 18–21, 21–15, 21–15	1 Q	—	Tian Q / Zhao Yl (CHN); L 10–21, 14–21	Did not advance		

Mixed

Athlete	Event	Group Stage				Quarterfinal	Semifinal	Final / BM	
Athlete	Event	Opposition Score	Opposition Score	Opposition Score	Rank	Opposition Score	Opposition Score	Opposition Score	Rank
Chen Hung-ling; Cheng Wen-hsing	Doubles	Xu C / Ma J (CHN); L 16–21, 20–22	Prapakamol / Thoungthongkam (THA); L 15–21, 16–21	Chan P S / Goh L Y (MAS); W 21–12, 6–21, 21–15	3	Did not advance			

== Cycling ==
=== Road ===
Athlete	Event	Time	Rank
Hsiao Mei-yu	Women's road race	OTL	

=== Track ===
Omnium

Athlete	Event	Flying lap		Points race		Elimination race	Individual pursuit		Scratch race	Time trial		Total points	Rank
Athlete	Event	Time	Rank	Points	Rank	Rank	Time	Rank	Rank	Time	Rank	Total points	Rank
Hsiao Mei-yu	Women's omnium	14.662	11	2	17	17	3:49.051	16	15	36.482	9	85	17

== Fencing ==
Women

Athlete	Event	Round of 64	Round of 32	Round of 16	Quarterfinal	Semifinal	Final / BM	
Athlete	Event	Opposition Score	Opposition Score	Opposition Score	Opposition Score	Opposition Score	Opposition Score	Rank
Hsu Jo-ting	Individual épée	Hassanein (EGY); W 15–10	Brânză (ROU); L 8–15	Did not advance				

== Judo ==
Chinese Taipei has qualified 1 judoka

Athlete	Event	Round of 64	Round of 32	Round of 16	Quarterfinals	Semifinals	Repechage	Final / BM	
Athlete	Event	Opposition Result	Opposition Result	Opposition Result	Opposition Result	Opposition Result	Opposition Result	Opposition Result	Rank
Tu Kai-wen	Men's −66 kg	Bye	Khashbaatar (MGL); L 0001–0111	Did not advance					

== Rowing ==
Chinese Taipei has qualified the following boats.

Men

Athlete	Event	Heats		Repechage		Quarterfinals		Semifinal		Final	
Athlete	Event	Time	Rank	Time	Rank	Time	Rank	Time	Rank	Time	Rank
Wang Ming-hui	Single sculls	7:15.77	4 R	BUW	5 SE/F	Bye		7:33.18	1 FE	7:33.28	26

Qualification Legend: FA=Final A (medal); FB=Final B (non-medal); FC=Final C (non-medal); FD=Final D (non-medal); FE=Final E (non-medal); FF=Final F (non-medal); SA/B=Semifinals A/B; SC/D=Semifinals C/D; SE/F=Semifinals E/F; QF=Quarterfinals; R=Repechage

== Sailing ==
Chinese Taipei has qualified 1 boat for each of the following events

Men

Athlete	Event	Race											Net points	Final Rank
Athlete	Event	1	2	3	4	5	6	7	8	9	10	M*	Net points	Final Rank
Chang Hao	RS:X	33	36	35	36	33	33	~~37~~	37	24	22	EL	289	35

M = Medal race; EL = Eliminated – did not advance into the medal race;

== Shooting ==
Chinese Taipei has ensured berths in the following shooting events:

Women

Athlete	Event	Qualification		Final	
Athlete	Event	Points	Rank	Points	Rank
Lin Yi-chun	Trap	68	10	Did not advance	
Tien Chia-chen	25 m pistol	580	16	Did not advance	
Tien Chia-chen	10 m air pistol	378	27	Did not advance	
Yu Ai-wen	10 m air pistol	375	36	Did not advance	

== Swimming ==
Swimmers from Chinese Taipei have so far achieved qualifying standards in the following events (up to a maximum of 2 swimmers in each event at the Olympic Qualifying Time (OQT), and potentially 1 at the Olympic Selection Time (OST)):

Men

Athlete	Event	Heat		Semifinal		Final	
Athlete	Event	Time	Rank	Time	Rank	Time	Rank
Hsu Chi-chieh	200 m butterfly	1:59.81	30	Did not advance			

Women

Athlete	Event	Heat		Semifinal		Final	
Athlete	Event	Time	Rank	Time	Rank	Time	Rank
Chen I-chuan	100 m breaststroke	1:11.28	38	Did not advance			
Cheng Wan-jung	200 m butterfly	2:14.29	28	Did not advance			
Cheng Wan-jung	200 m individual medley	2:17.39	31	Did not advance			

== Table tennis ==
Chinese Taipei has qualified a man and two women in table tennis.

Athlete	Event	Preliminary round	Round 1	Round 2	Round 3	Round 4	Quarterfinals	Semifinals	Final / BM	
Athlete	Event	Opposition Result	Opposition Result	Opposition Result	Opposition Result	Opposition Result	Opposition Result	Opposition Result	Opposition Result	Rank
Chuang Chih-yuan	Men's singles	Bye			Zwickl (HUN); W 4–0	Gaćina (CRO); W 4–2	Crișan (ROM); W 4–0	Wang H (CHN); L 1–4	Ovtcharov (GER); L 2–4	4
Chen Szu-yu	Women's singles	Bye		Tóth (HUN); W 4–3	Feng Tw (SIN); L 1–4	Did not advance				
Huang Yi-hua	Women's singles	Bye		Miao (AUS); W 4–0	Li Q (POL); L 0–4	Did not advance				

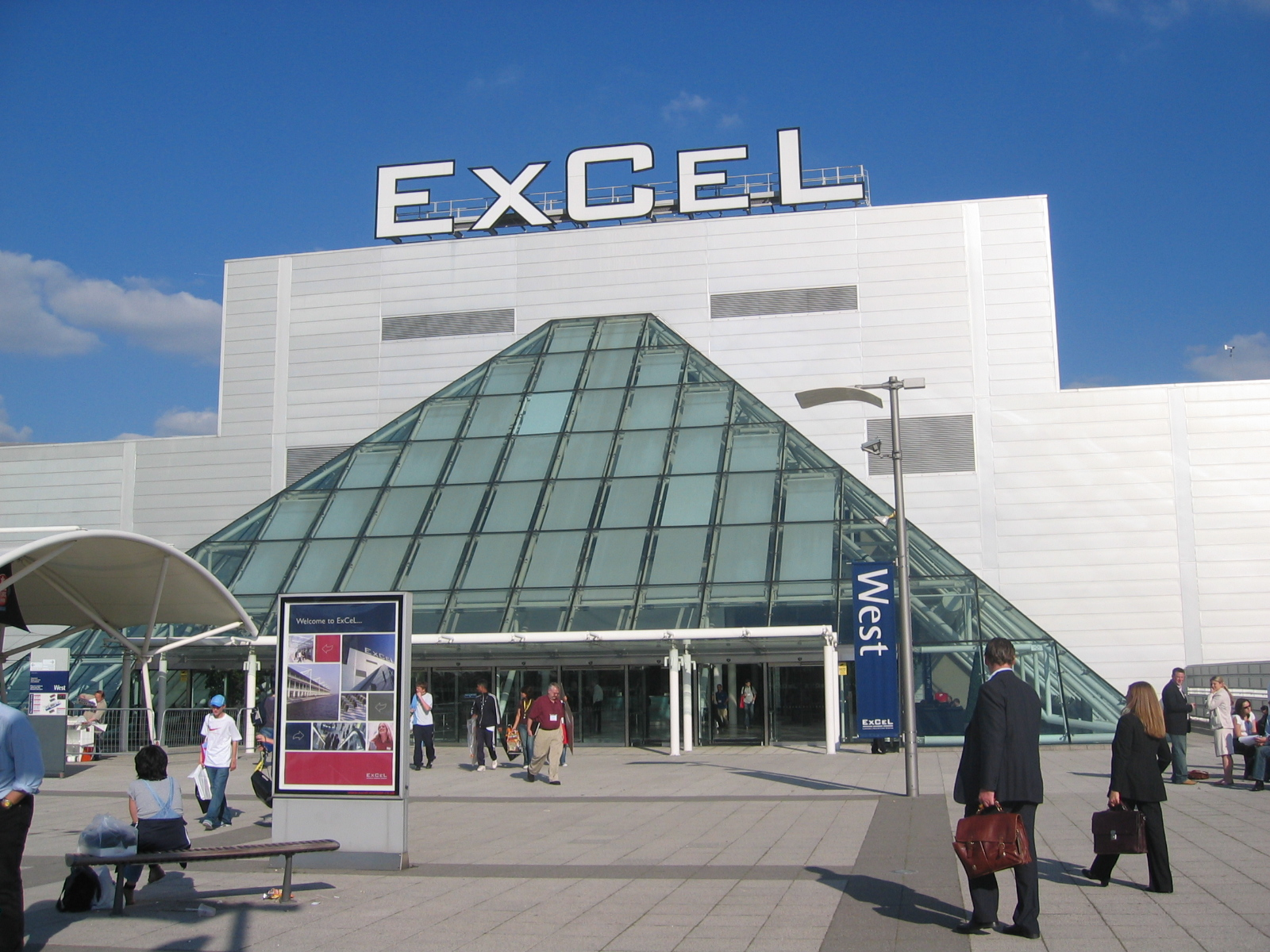
London ExCel Exhibition Centre

== Taekwondo ==
Chinese Taipei has ensured berths in the following events of taekwondo by reaching the top 3 of the 2011 WTF World Qualification Tournament or the Asian Qualification Tournament:

Athlete	Event	Round of 16	Quarterfinals	Semifinals	Repechage	Bronze Medal	Final	
Athlete	Event	Opposition Result	Opposition Result	Opposition Result	Opposition Result	Opposition Result	Opposition Result	Rank
Wei Chen-yang	Men's −58 kg	Le H C (VIE); W 5–1	Denisenko (RUS); L 7–10	Did not advance				
Yang Shu-chun	Women's −49 kg	Manz (GER); W 10–3	Chanatip (THA); L 0–6	Did not advance				
Tseng Li-cheng	Women's −57 kg	Nisaisom (THA); W 4–1	Paoli (LIB); W 5–2	Jones (GBR); L 6–10	Bye	Mikkonen (FIN); W 14–2	Did not advance	3rd place, bronze medalist(s)

== Tennis ==
Athlete	Event	Round of 64	Round of 32	Round of 16	Quarterfinals	Semifinals	Final / BM	
Athlete	Event	Opposition Score	Opposition Score	Opposition Score	Opposition Score	Opposition Score	Opposition Score	Rank
Lu Yen-hsun	Men's singles	Jaziri (TUN); L 6–7^{(10–12)}, 6–4, 3–6	Did not advance					
Hsieh Su-wei	Women's singles	Peng (CHN); L 3–6, 7–6^{(7–3)}, 5–7	Did not advance					
Chuang Chia-jung; Hsieh Su-wei	Women's doubles	—	Chakravarthi / Mirza (IND); W 6–1, 3–6, 6–1	Pennetta / Schiavone (ITA); W 6–7, 7–5, 6–4	Hlaváčková / Hradecká (CZE); L 3–6, 4–6	Did not advance		

== Weightlifting ==
Chinese Taipei has qualified 1 man and 3 women.

Athlete	Event	Snatch		Clean & Jerk		Total	Rank
Athlete	Event	Result	Rank	Result	Rank	Total	Rank
Chen Shih-chieh	Men's +105 kg	182	13	236	6	418	10
Hsu Shu-ching	Women's −53 kg	96	2	123	2	219	1st place, gold medalist(s)
Kuo Hsing-chun	Women's −58 kg	99	12	129	5	228	8
Huang Shih-hsu	Women's −69 kg	110	8	131	8	241	7
