= Archery at the 2012 Summer Olympics – Men's team =

Men's team at the Games of the XXX Olympiad
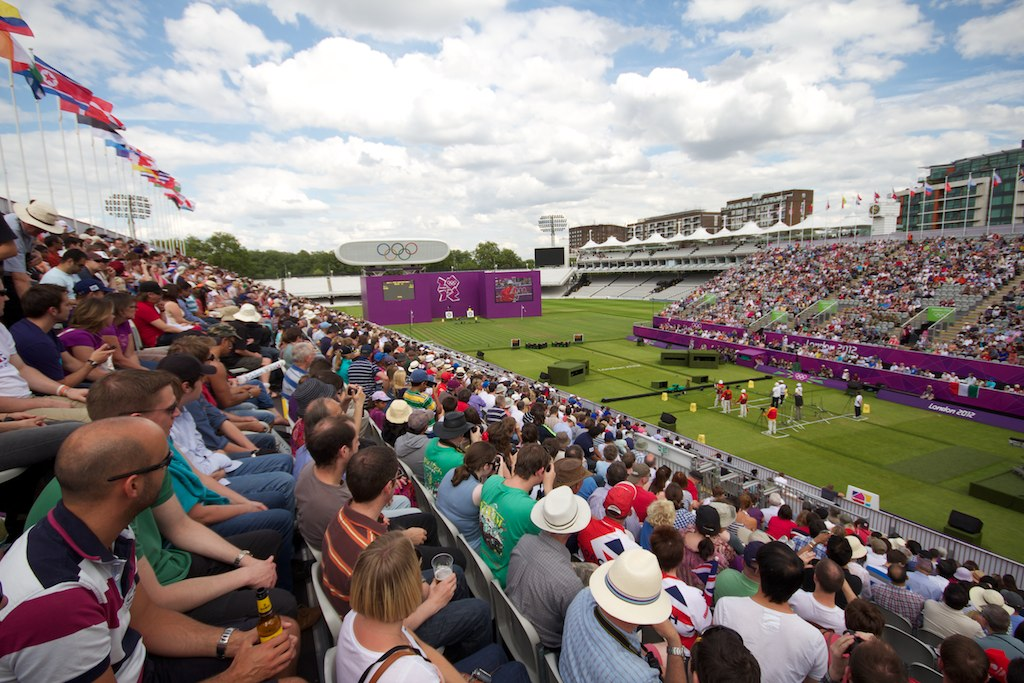
- View of Lord's Cricket Ground during the event
- Venue: Lord's Cricket Ground
- Dates: 27–28 July 2012
- Competitors: 36 from 12 nations
- Winning score: 219

Medalists
1st place, gold medalist(s)		Michele Frangilli; Marco Galiazzo; Mauro Nespoli	Italy
2nd place, silver medalist(s)		Brady Ellison; Jacob Wukie; Jake Kaminski	United States
3rd place, bronze medalist(s)		Im Dong-Hyun; Kim Bub-Min; Oh Jin-Hyek	South Korea

The men's team archery competition at the 2012 Olympic Games in London was held on 27–28 July at Lord's Cricket Ground. The event was one of four which comprised the 2012 Olympic archery programme.

Italy won the gold medal with Michele Frangilli, Marco Galiazzo and Mauro Nespoli. The United States won silver and South Korea won bronze.

== Competition format ==
The teams were ranked 1st to 12th based on the three team members' ranking round results and this was used to seed them into a head-to-head knockout bracket. Each member of the team shot eight arrows in a match (for a total of 24 arrows per team) and the team with the highest total won the match. The winner advanced to the next round while the loser was eliminated from the competition.

== Schedule ==
All times are British Summer Time (UTC+1).

Date	Time	Round
Friday, 27 July 2012	09:00–11:00	Ranking round
Saturday, 28 July 2012	09:00–10:40	First round
Saturday, 28 July 2012	15:00–16:40	Quarter-finals
Saturday, 28 July 2012	16:40–17:30	Semi-finals
Saturday, 28 July 2012	17:31–18:26	Final

== Records ==
Prior to this competition, the existing world and Olympic records were as follows. The ranking round records were broken during the 2012 competition by the South Korean team.

- 216 arrow ranking round

World record	South Korea; Im Dong-Hyun, Kim Bub-Min, Oh Jin-Hyek	2069	Antalya, Turkey	2 May 2012
Olympic record	South Korea; Jang Yong-Ho, Kim Bo-Ram, Oh Kyo-Moon	2031	Atlanta, United States	1 July 1996

- 24 arrow match

World record	South Korea; Im Dong-Hyun, Kim Bub-Min, Oh Jin-Hyek	233	London, United Kingdom	4 October 2011
Olympic record	South Korea; Im Dong-Hyun, Lee Chang-hwan, Park Kyung-Mo	227	Beijing, China	11 August 2008

== Results ==
=== Ranking round ===
Rank	Nation	Archer	Score	10s	Xs
1	South Korea	Im Dong-Hyun; Kim Bub-Min; Oh Jin-Hyek	2087 (WR)	145	75
2	France	Thomas Faucheron; Romain Girouille; Gaël Prevost	2021	95	36
3	China	Dai Xiaoxiang; Liu Zhaowu; Xing Yu	2019	100	37
4	United States	Brady Ellison; Jacob Wukie; Jake Kaminski	2019	99	36
5	Japan	Takaharu Furukawa; Yu Ishizu; Hideki Kikuchi	2009	99	28
6	Italy	Michele Frangilli; Marco Galiazzo; Mauro Nespoli	1998	89	31
7	Mexico	Luis Alvarez; Juan René Serrano; Eduardo Vélez	1996	85	28
8	Great Britain	Laurence Godfrey; Simon Terry; Alan Wills	1994	86	20
9	Ukraine	Dmytro Hrachov; Markiyan Ivashko; Viktor Ruban	1992	88	33
10	Malaysia	Cheng Chu Sian; Haziq Kamaruddin; Khairul Anuar Mohamad	1981	79	28
11	Chinese Taipei	Chen Yu-Chen; Kuo Cheng-Wei; Wang Cheng-Pang	1972	85	29
12	India	Rahul Banerjee; Jayanta Talukdar; Tarundeep Rai	1969	71	26

=== Competition bracket ===
First round
8	Great Britain	212
9	Ukraine	223
5	Japan	214^{29}
12	India	214^{27}
11	Chinese Taipei	206
6	Italy	216
7	Mexico	216
10	Malaysia	211

Quarter-finals
1	South Korea	227
9	Ukraine	220
5	Japan	219
4	United States	220
3	China	216
6	Italy	220
7	Mexico	220
2	France	212

Semi-finals
1	South Korea	219
4	United States	224
6	Italy	217
7	Mexico	215

Final
4	United States	218
6	Italy	219
Third place
1	South Korea	224
7	Mexico	219
