= Camilo Mayr =

German archer

Personal information
- Born: 4 March 1991 (age 34) Bogotá, Colombia
- Height: 1.78 m (5 ft 10 in)
- Weight: 74 kg (163 lb)

Sport
- Country: Germany
- Sport: Archery
- Event: Recurve
- Club: Sgi Welzheim
- Coached by: Oliver Haidn

Camilo Mayr (born 4 March 1991 in Bogotá, Colombia) is a German archer. In 2012 participated in the men's individual competition at the 2012 Summer Olympics in London, finishing in joint 33rd place.
