= Yu Ishizu =

Japanese archer (born 1987)

Yu Ishizu (石津 優, Ishizu Yū; born 8 April 1987, in Hiroshima, Japan) is a Japanese archer. At the 2012 Summer Olympics he competed for his country in the Men's team event and the men's individual event.

In the team event, Japan beat India in the first round after a shootout, before losing by one point to the US. Ishizu was knocked out in the first round of the individual event, losing 7-1 to Simon Terry.
