= Arturo Malaquias =

Mexican long-distance runner

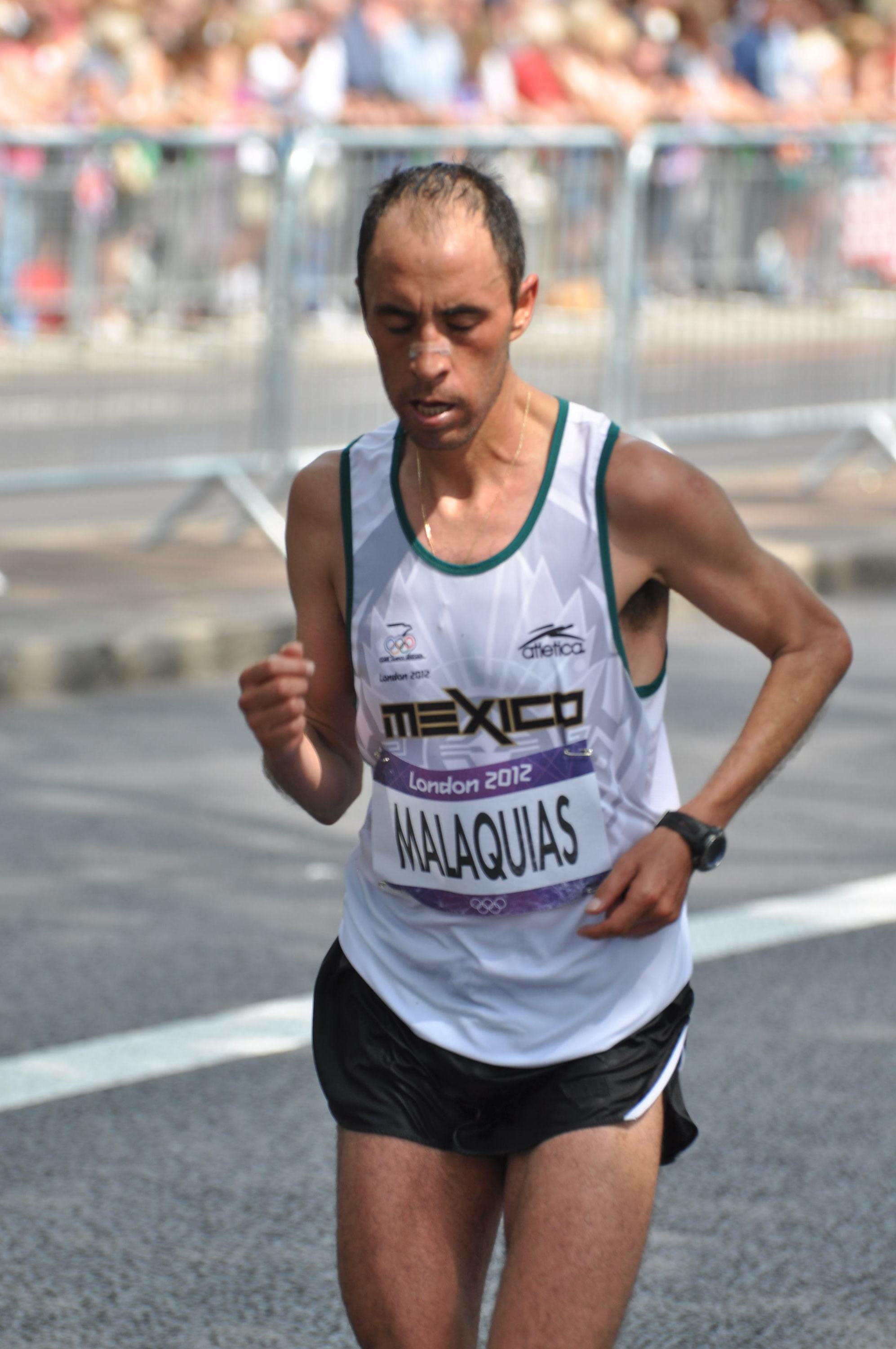

Personal information
- Born: April 16, 1975 (age 50) Toluca, Mexico
- Height: 1.69 m (5 ft 6 1/2 in)
- Weight: 55 kg (121 lb)

Sport
- Country: Mexico
- Sport: Athletics
- Event: Marathon

Arturo Malaquias (born 1975) is a Mexican long-distance runner. He was born in Toluca. He qualified to represent Mexico in marathon at the 2012 Summer Olympics in London, finishing in 70th place.
