= Liu Zhaowu =

Chinese archer (born 1988)

Personal information
- Born: 12 October 1988 (age 37) Fujian, China
Medal record
Men's recurve archery
Representing China
Asian Championships
Silver medal – second place	2011 Tehran	Team
Summer Universiade
Gold medal – first place	2011 Shenzhen	Team

Liu Zhaowu (born 12 October 1988, in Fujian, China) is a Chinese archer. At the 2012 Summer Olympics he competed for his country in the Men's individual and team events.
