= Malaysia at the 2012 Summer Olympics =

- IOC code: MAS
- NOC: Olympic Council of Malaysia
- Website: www.olympic.org.my (in English)

in London
- Competitors: 30 in 9 sports
- Flag bearer: Pandelela Rinong
- Medals Ranked 65th: Gold 0 Silver 1 Bronze 1 Total 2

Summer Olympics appearances (overview)
- 1956; 1960; 1964; 1968; 1972; 1976; 1980; 1984; 1988; 1992; 1996; 2000; 2004; 2008; 2012; 2016; 2020; 2024; 2028

Other related appearances
- North Borneo (1956)

Malaysia competed at the 2012 Summer Olympics in London, from 27 July to 12 August 2012. This was the nation's fourteenth appearance at the Olympics, although it had previously competed in two other games under the name Malaya. Malaysia did not participate at the 1980 Summer Olympics in Moscow, because of its partial support to the United States boycott. Ahmad Sarji Abdul Hamid was the Chef de Mission of the national delegation at the Games.

Olympic Council of Malaysia sent a total of 29 athletes to the Games, 16 men and 13 women, to compete in 9 sports. This was also the youngest delegation in Malaysia's Olympic history, with more than half under the age of 25, and many of them were expected to reach their peak in time for the 2016 Olympics in Rio de Janeiro. Nine Malaysian athletes had competed in Beijing, including platform diver Pandelela Rinong, who was appointed by the council to carry the nation's flag at the opening ceremony. Diver Yeoh Ken Nee, on the other hand, made his Olympic return in London, after a twelve-year absence. For the first time since its official Olympic debut, Malaysia did not qualify athletes in taekwondo.

This was Malaysia's most successful Olympics outing since the 1996 Atlanta Olympics and was surpassed by their results in 2016 Rio Olympics, winning a total of 2 medals. Flagbearer Pandelela Rinong made history as the first Malaysian woman to win an Olympic medal and the first Malaysian athlete to win an Olympic medal in any event besides badminton, when she took the bronze medal in women's 10 meter platform diving. Meanwhile, badminton player Lee Chong Wei, repeated his silver medal victory from Beijing, becoming the first Malaysian athlete to hold more than one Olympic medal.

== Medalists ==
Medal	Name	Sport	Event	Date
Silver	Lee Chong Wei	Badminton	Men's singles	5 August
Bronze	Pandelela Rinong	Diving	Women's 10 metre platform	9 August

Medals by sport
Sport	1st place, gold medalist(s)	2nd place, silver medalist(s)	3rd place, bronze medalist(s)	Total
Badminton	0	1	0	1
Diving	0	0	1	1
Total	0	1	1	2

== Archery ==
Malaysia has qualified three archers for the men's individual event, a team for the men's team event and one archer for the women's individual event.

Athlete	Event	Ranking round		Round of 64	Round of 32	Round of 16	Quarterfinals	Semifinals	Final / BM	
Athlete	Event	Score	Seed	Opposition Score	Opposition Score	Opposition Score	Opposition Score	Opposition Score	Opposition Score	Rank
Cheng Chu Sian	Men's individual	658	45	Mohamad (MAS) (20); L 4–6	Did not advance					
Haziq Kamaruddin	Men's individual	654	48	Gankin (KAZ) (17); L 4–6	Did not advance					
Khairul Anuar Mohamad	Men's individual	669	20	Cheng C S (MAS) (45); W 6–4	Xing Y (CHN) (13); W 5–4	Godfrey (GBR) (4); W 6–5	Furukawa (JPN) (5); L 2–6	Did not advance		
Cheng Chu Sian; Haziq Kamaruddin; Khairul Anuar Mohamad	Men's team	1981	10	—N/a		Mexico (7); L 211–216	Did not advance			
Nurul Syafiqah Hashim	Women's individual	599	60	Lin C-e (TPE) (5); L 2–6	Did not advance					

== Athletics ==
Malaysia has selected two athletes by wildcard.

Key

- Note – Ranks given for track events are within the athlete's heat only
- Q = Qualified for the next round
- q = Qualified for the next round as a fastest loser or, in field events, by position without achieving the qualifying target
- NR = National record
- N/A = Round not applicable for the event
- Bye = Athlete not required to compete in round

Men

Athlete	Event	Qualification		Final	
Athlete	Event	Distance	Position	Distance	Position
Lee Hup Wei	High jump	2.16	30	did not advance	

Women

Athlete	Event	Heat		Semifinal		Final	
Athlete	Event	Result	Rank	Result	Rank	Result	Rank
Noraseela Khalid	400 m hurdles	1:00.16	9	did not advance			

== Badminton ==
Athlete	Event	Group stage				Elimination	Quarterfinal	Semifinal	Final / BM	
Athlete	Event	Opposition Score	Opposition Score	Opposition Score	Rank	Opposition Score	Opposition Score	Opposition Score	Opposition Score	Rank
Lee Chong Wei	Men's singles	Lång (FIN); W (21–8, 14–21, 21–11)	—N/a		1 Q	Santoso (INA); W (21–12, 21–8)	Kashyap (IND); W (21–19, 21–11)	Chen L (CHN); W (21–13, 21–14)	Lin D (CHN); L (21–15, 10–21, 19–21)	2nd place, silver medalist(s)
Koo Kien Keat; Tan Boon Heong	Men's doubles	Kawamae / Sato (JPN); W (21–12, 21–14)	Bach / Gunawan (USA); W (21–12, 21–14)	Jung J-s / Lee Y-d (KOR); L (16–21, 11–21)	2 Q	—N/a	Isara / Jongjit (THA); W (21–16, 21–18)	Fu / Cai (CHN); L (9–21, 19–21)	Jung J-s / Lee Y-d (KOR); L (21–23, 10–21)	4
Tee Jing Yi	Women's singles	Bae Y-j (KOR); L (21–16, 15–21, 12–21)	Allegrini (ITA); W (21–7, 21–14)	—N/a	2	Did not advance				
Chan Peng Soon; Goh Liu Ying	Mixed doubles	Chen H-l / Cheng W-h (TPE); L (12–21, 21–6, 15–21)	Xu C / Ma J (CHN); L (14–21, 8–21)	Prapakamol / Thoungthongkam (THA); L (16–21, 15–21)	4	—N/a	Did not advance			

== Cycling ==
=== Road ===
Athlete	Event	Time	Rank
Mohammed Adiq Husainie Othman	Men's road race	Did not finish	
Amir Rusli	Men's road race	Did not finish	

=== Track ===
Sprint

Athlete	Event	Qualification		Round 1	Repechage 1	Round 2	Repechage 2	Quarterfinals	Semifinals	Final	
Athlete	Event	Time Speed (km/h)	Rank	Opposition Time Speed (km/h)	Opposition Time Speed (km/h)	Opposition Time Speed (km/h)	Opposition Time Speed (km/h)	Opposition Time Speed (km/h)	Opposition Time Speed (km/h)	Opposition Time Speed (km/h)	Rank
Azizulhasni Awang	Men's sprint	10.226; 70.408	11	Zhang M (CHN); W 10.473; 68.748	Bye	Dmitriev (RUS); L	Nakagawa (JPN); Canelón (VEN); W 10.456; 68.859	Kenny (GBR); L, L	Did not advance	5th place final Dmitriev (RUS); Watkins (USA); Förstemann (GER); L	8

Keirin

Athlete	Event	1st Round	Repechage	2nd Round	Final
Athlete	Event	Rank	Rank	Rank	Rank
Azizulhasni Awang	Men's keirin	2 Q	Bye	2 Q	6
Fatehah Mustapa	Women's keirin	4 R	5	Did not advance	15

== Diving ==
Malaysia has qualified 9 quota spots in diving, 2 each from 2011 World Aquatics Championships in Shanghai and Asian Diving Cup in Kuala Lumpur and 5 from the 2012 Diving World Cup.

Men

Athlete	Event	Preliminaries		Semifinals		Final	
Athlete	Event	Points	Rank	Points	Rank	Points	Rank
Huang Qiang	3 m springboard	433.85	19	Did not advance			
Yeoh Ken Nee	3 m springboard	452.60	10 Q	441.65	12 Q	437.45	10
Bryan Nickson Lomas	10 m platform	434.95	19	Did not advance			
Huang Qiang; Bryan Nickson Lomas	3 m synchronised springboard	—N/a				405.09	8

Women

Athlete	Event	Preliminaries		Semifinals		Final	
Athlete	Event	Points	Rank	Points	Rank	Points	Rank
Cheong Jun Heong	3 m springboard	272.45	20	Did not advance			
Ng Yan Yee	3 m springboard	257.85	24	Did not advance			
Pandelela Rinong	10 m platform	349.00	2 Q	352.50	5 Q	359.20	3rd place, bronze medalist(s)
Traisy Vivien Tukiet	10 m platform	285.00	22	Did not advance			
Cheong Jun Heong; Pandelela Rinong	3 m synchronised springboard	—N/a				283.50	8
Leong Mun Yee; Pandelela Rinong	10 m synchronised platform	—N/a				308.52	7

== Fencing ==
Malaysia has qualified 1 fencer.

Men

Athlete	Event	Round of 64	Round of 32	Round of 16	Quarterfinal	Semifinal	Final / BM	
Athlete	Event	Opposition Score	Opposition Score	Opposition Score	Opposition Score	Opposition Score	Opposition Score	Rank
Yu Peng Kean	Individual sabre	Zeid (EGY); W 15–12	Szilágyi (HUN); L 1–15	Did not advance				

== Sailing ==
Malaysia has qualified 1 boat for each of the following events

Men

Athlete	Event	Race											Net points	Final rank
Athlete	Event	1	2	3	4	5	6	7	8	9	10	M*	Net points	Final rank
Khairul Nizam Mohd Affendy	Laser	42	47	~~48~~	47	47	44	37	45	40	45	EL	394	47

M = Medal race; EL = Eliminated – did not advance into the medal race;

== Shooting ==
Malaysia has ensured berths in the following events of shooting:

Women

Athlete	Event	Qualification		Final	
Athlete	Event	Points	Rank	Points	Rank
Nur Suryani Muhd Taibi	10 m air rifle	392	34	Did not advance	

== Swimming ==
Malaysian swimmers have so far achieved qualifying standards in the following events (up to a maximum of 2 swimmers in each event at the Olympic Qualifying Time (OQT), and potentially 1 at the Olympic Selection Time (OST)):

Women

Athlete	Event	Heat		Final	
Athlete	Event	Time	Rank	Time	Rank
Heidi Gan	10 km open water	—N/a		2:00:45.0	16
Khoo Cai Lin	800 m freestyle	8:51.18	30	Did not advance	
