= Rick van der Ven =

Dutch archer (born 1991)

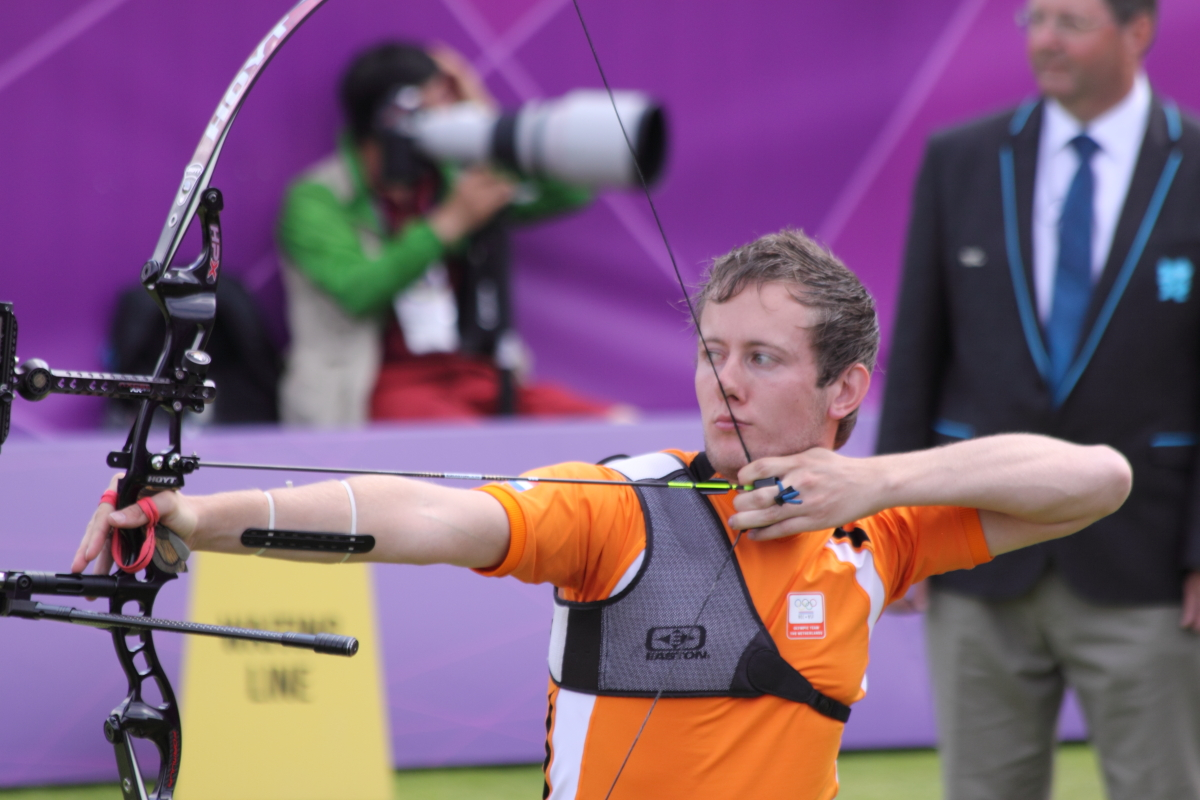
- Rick van der Ven at the London Olympic Games in 2012

Personal information
- Born: 14 April 1991 (age 35) Oss, Netherlands

Sport
- Sport: Archery
Medal record
Men's archery
Representing Netherlands
World Championships
Silver medal – second place	2013 Belek	Team
Silver medal – second place	2015 Copenhagen	Individual
World Cup
Gold medal – first place	2014 Wrocław	Individual
Bronze medal – third place	2014 Lausanne Final	Individual
Bronze medal – third place	2014 Shanghai	Individual
Bronze medal – third place	2014 Shanghai	Team
Bronze medal – third place	2015 Medellín	Individual
Silver medal – second place	2016 Shanghai	Team
European Championships
Gold medal – first place	2012 Amsterdam	Individual
Gold medal – first place	2012 Amsterdam	Team
Gold medal – first place	2022 Munich	Mixed team
World Indoor Championships
Bronze medal – third place	2014 Nîmes	Team
Indoor World Cup
Gold medal – first place	2014 Nîmes	Individual
Bronze medal – third place	2025 Luxembourg	Individual
European Indoor Championships
Gold medal – first place	2013 Rzeszów	Individual
Gold medal – first place	2013 Rzeszów	Team
Gold medal – first place	2015 Koper	Team
European Games
Bronze medal – third place	2015 Baku	Team
Olympic Test Event
Bronze medal – third place	2015 Rio de Janeiro	Team

Rick van der Ven (born 14 April 1991 in Oss) is a Dutch Olympic archer who started to practise archery at the age of 8.

In 2009 at the World Junior Championship in Ogden, Utah, Rick was the runner-up with a silver medal. In 2011 at the World Junior Championship in Legnica, Poland he won silver with the Mixed team, bronze with the men's team and finished 4th in the individual event. In May 2012 in the Olympic Stadium in Amsterdam, Van der Ven became European Champion in Outdoor Archery, both individually and in the team event. In February 2013, in Rzeszów, Van der Ven became also European Champion Indoor, again individually as well as with the Dutch team.

== 2012 Olympic Games ==
Van der Ven competed at the 2012 Summer Olympics in London in men's individual archery. He was coached by Wietse van Alten, winner of the bronze medal in Sydney 2000. In an upset victory, he convincingly beat top-seed and world-record holder Im Dong-hyun 7–1 in the round of 16. After beating Kuo Cheng-Wei 6–0 in the quarterfinals, he came to a 5–5 draw in the semi-finals against Takaharu Furukawa, shooting 141 versus Furukawa's 140. In the following shoot-off he shot a 9 while Furukawa shot a 10, relegating him to a bronze medal match against Dai Xiaoxiang. Here Van der Ven again came to a 5–5 draw, scoring 2 points more than his opponent, but lost again in the first shoot-off, thereby finishing in 4th position. Since 2009 Rick van der Ven is training at The Olympic Sportcentre in Papendal and is studying Engineering Mechanics in Arnhem.

== 2016 Olympic Games ==
At the 2016 Olympic Games, van der Ven competed in both the individual and the men's team events. In the individual event, van der Ven was in 27th after the ranking round, and faced Patrick Huston in the first knock-out round, losing 4–6. In the team event, the Netherlands were ranked in 9th after the ranking round. They faced the Spanish team in the first elimination round, winning 5–1, before losing to the South Korean team 0–6.

== Results 2007 ==
Gold medal – first place	Dutch Championship-Outdoor Cadet	(Netherlands)
Gold medal – first place	Face-2-Face Junior	Diessen (Netherlands)

== Results 2008 ==
Gold medal – first place	Dutch Championship-Outdoor Junior	(Netherlands)
Gold medal – first place	Face-2-Face Junior	Diessen (Netherlands)
Bronze medal – third place	Junior Cup Team	Legnica (Poland)

== Results 2009 ==
Silver medal – second place	Junior World Championship-Outdoor	Ogden (United States)
Bronze medal – third place	Junior Cup Team	Legnica (Poland)

== Results 2010 ==
Gold medal – first place	European Championship-Indoor Junior team	Poreč (Croatia)
Gold medal – first place	Dutch Championship-Outdoor	(Netherlands)
Gold medal – first place	Dutch Championship-Outdoor Junior	(Netherlands)
Gold medal – first place	Dutch Championship-Indoor	(Netherlands)
Silver medal – second place	European Championship -Outdoor Junior team	Winnenden (Germany)
Silver medal – second place	Dutch Championship-Indoor Junior	(Netherlands)

== Results 2011 ==
Gold medal – first place	Dutch Championship-Outdoor	(Netherlands)
Gold medal – first place	Dutch Championship-Indoor Junior	(Netherlands)
Silver medal – second place	World Championship-Outdoor Junior Mixed team	Legnica (Poland)
Silver medal – second place	Dutch Championship-Indoor	(Netherlands)
Bronze medal – third place	World Championship-Outdoor Junior team	Legnica (Poland)
Bronze medal – third place	EMAU GP-Outdoor Team	Antalya (Turkey)

== Results 2012 ==
Gold medal – first place	European Championship -Outdoor	Amsterdam (Netherlands)
Gold medal – first place	European Championship -Outdoor Team	Amsterdam (Netherlands)
Gold medal – first place	Dutch Championship-Outdoor	(Netherlands)
Silver medal – second place	Berlin Open	Berlin (Germany)
Bronze medal – third place	European Indoor Tournament	Nimes (France)

== Results 2013 ==
Gold medal – first place	European Championship -Indoor	Rzeszów (Poland)
Gold medal – first place	European Championship -Indoor Team	Rzeszów (Poland)
Gold medal – first place	World Cup-Indoor	Marrakesh (Morocco)
Gold medal – first place	Dutch Championship-Indoor	(Netherlands)
Silver medal – second place	World Championship-Outdoor Team	Belek-Antalya (Turkey)
Silver medal – second place	European Indoor Tournament	Nimes (France)
Silver medal – second place	Dutch Championship-Outdoor	Almere (Netherlands)
Bronze medal – third place	Indoor World Cup Finale	Las Vegas (United States)

== Results 2014 ==
Gold medal – first place	Indoor World Cup Final	Las Vegas (United States)
Gold medal – first place	Indoor World Cup	Las Vegas (United States)
Gold medal – first place	World Cup	Wrocław (Poland)
Gold medal – first place	Eucrea Archery Champions-Day	Sternenfels (Germany)
Gold medal – first place	Dutch Championship-Indoor	(Netherlands)
Gold medal – first place	Dutch Championship-Field	Zuidlaren (Netherlands)
Silver medal – second place	Dutch Championship-Outdoor	Weert (Netherlands)
Bronze medal – third place	World Championship- Indoor Teams	Nimes (France)
Bronze medal – third place	World Cup Final	Lausanne (Switzerland)
Bronze medal – third place	World Cup	Shanghai (China)
Bronze medal – third place	World Cup Teams	Shanghai (China)

== Results 2015 ==
Gold medal – first place	European Championship-Indoor	Koper (Slovenia)
Gold medal – first place	Dutch Championship-Indoor	(Netherlands)
Silver medal – second place	World Championship-Outdoor	Copenhagen (Denmark)
Silver medal – second place	European Grand Prix Team	Marathon (Greece)
Bronze medal – third place	Olympic Test Event Team	Rio de Janeiro (Brazil)
Bronze medal – third place	European Games Team	Baku (Azerbaijan)
Bronze medal – third place	World Cup	Medellín (Colombia)

== Results 2016 ==
Silver medal – second place	World Cup Team	Shanghai (China)
Silver medal – second place	Kahraman Bagatir Team	Antalya (Turkey)
Bronze medal – third place	Dutch Championship-Indoor	(Netherlands)

== Results 2017 ==
Gold medal – first place	Dutch Championship-Field	(Netherlands)
Bronze medal – third place	GT-Open-Indoor	(Luxembourg)

== Results 2018 ==
Gold medal – first place	World Championship-Indoor Team	(United States)
Gold medal – first place	Dutch Championship-Outdoor	(Netherlands)
Silver medal – second place	Dutch Championship-Indoor	(Netherlands)
Bronze medal – third place	GT-Open-Indoor	(Luxembourg)

== Results 2019 ==
Gold medal – first place	Dutch Championship-Outdoor	(Netherlands)

== Results 2022 ==
Van der Ven and Gabriela Schloesser won the gold medal in the mixed team recurve event at the 2022 European Archery Championships held in Munich, Germany.
