= Jacob Wukie =

American archer (born 1986)

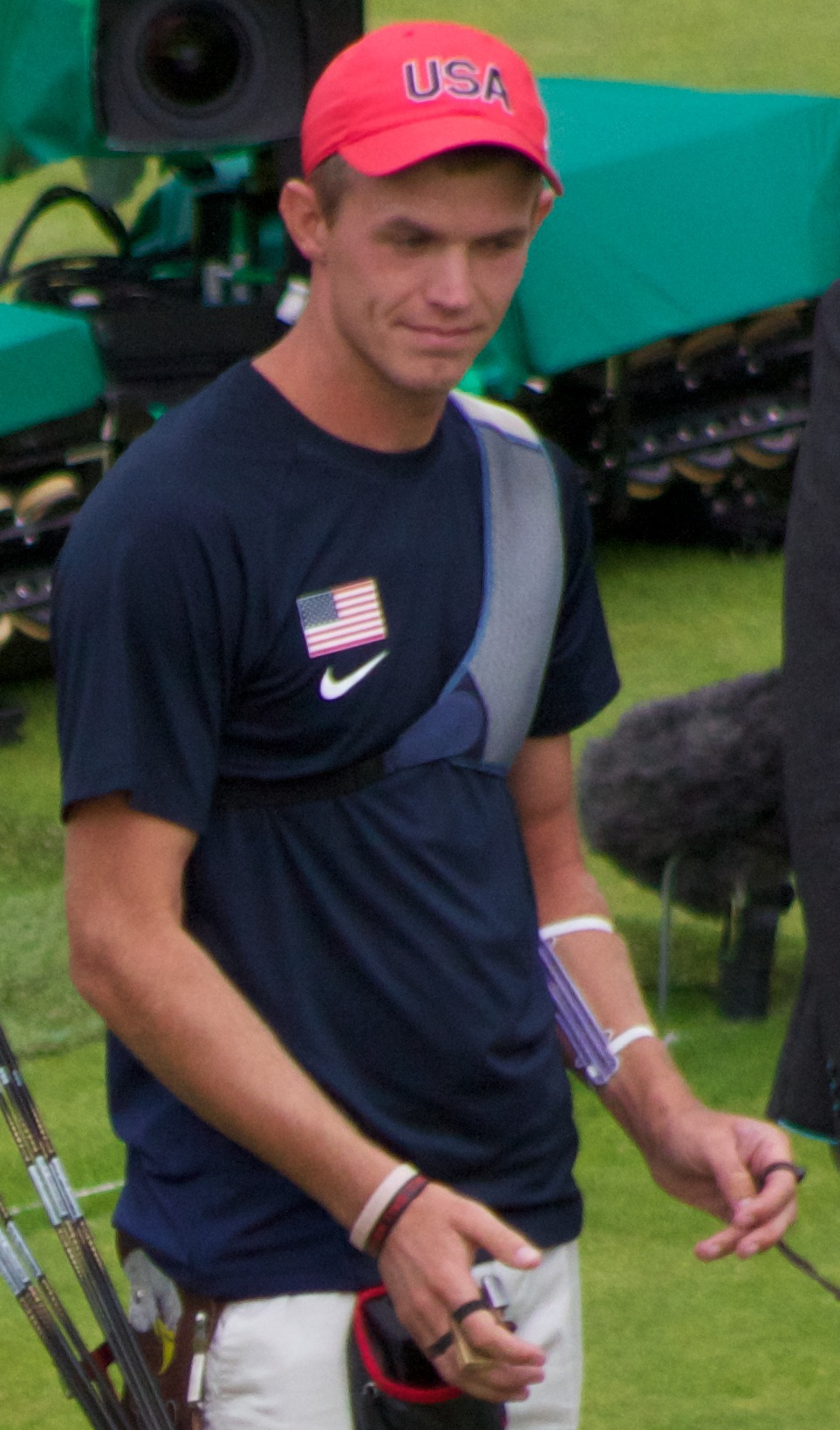
- Wukie at the 2012 Summer Olympics

Personal information
- Born: May 11, 1986 (age 40) Massillon, Ohio, U.S.
Medal record
Men's archery
Representing the United States
Olympic Games
| Silver medal – second place | 2012 London | Team |

Jacob Wukie (born May 11, 1986, in Massillon, Ohio) is an American archer. At the 2012 Summer Olympics he competed for his country in the Men's team event and the men's individual event. He won a silver Olympic medal along with his teammates Brady Ellison and Jake Kaminski.

== Career ==
At the individual event of the 2012 Summer Olympics, Wukie finished 12th in the ranking round, before eliminating Jayanta Talukdar in the first round. He was himself then knocked out by Bård Nesteng.

He qualified to represent the United States at the 2020 Summer Olympics.

Wukie, a devout Christian, is one of four children of John and Patty Wukie. Wukie attended James Madison University in Harrisonburg, Virginia. He married Brianne Pinkerton on December 1, 2012.
