= Kim Bub-min =

South Korean archer (born 1991)

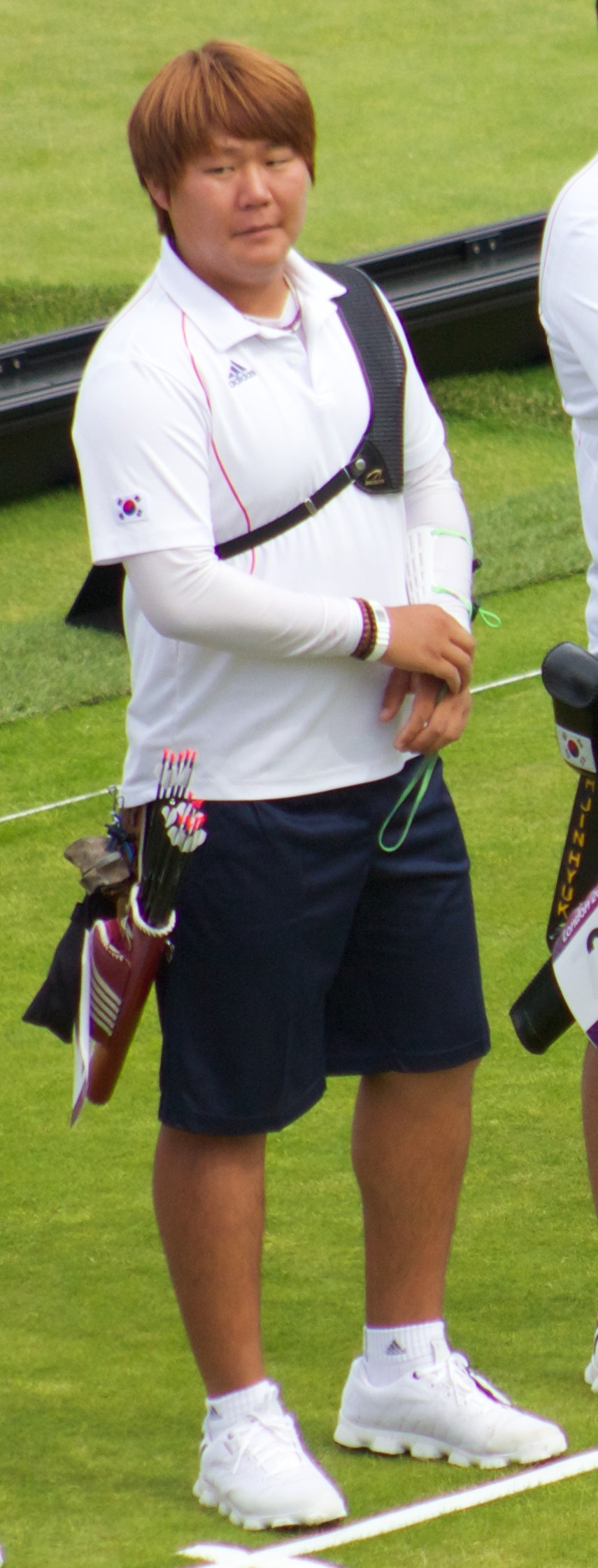

Medal record

Men's archery

Representing South Korea

Olympic Games
Bronze medal – third place	2012 London	Team

Summer Universiade
Gold medal – first place	2011 Shenzhen	Mixed Team
Bronze medal – third place	2011 Shenzhen	Individual

Kim Bub-min (Korean: 김법민; Korean pronunciation: [kim.bʌm.min]; born 22 May 1991) is a South Korean archer. He was born in Daejeon. At the 2012 Summer Olympics, he competed for his country, alongside partners Im Dong-hyun and Oh Jin-hyek in the Men's team event, finishing in third place. He also competed in the men's individual event, finishing in 5th place. He was ranked in second after the ranking round, then beat Rob Elder, Tarundeep Rai and Dan Olaru in the elimination rounds, before losing to Dai Xiaoxiang in the quarterfinals.
