= Jake Kaminski =

American archer (born 1988)

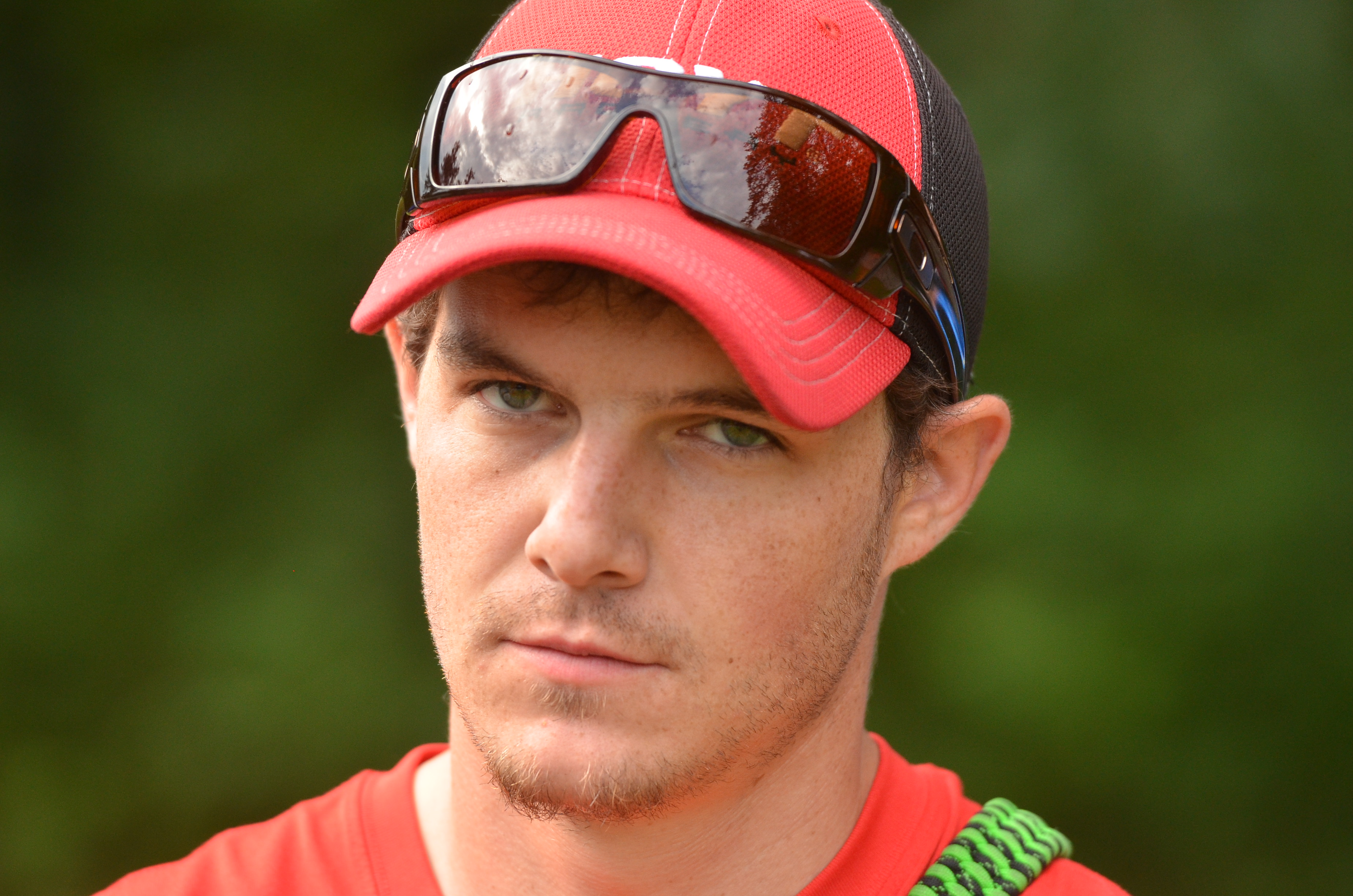
- Kaminski in 2014

Personal information
- Born: August 11, 1988 (age 37) Buffalo, New York, U.S.
- Height: 5 ft 9 in (175 cm)
Medal record
Men's recurve archery
Representing the United States
Olympic Games
Silver medal – second place	2012 London	Team
Silver medal – second place	2016 Rio de Janeiro	Team
World Championships
Gold medal – first place	2013 Belek	Team
World Cup Final
Gold medal – first place	2010 Edinburgh	Mixed Team
World Indoor Championships
Gold medal – first place	2012 Las Vegas	Team
Silver medal – second place	2012 Las Vegas	Individual
Pan American Games
Gold medal – first place	2011 Guadalajara	Team
Pan-American Championships
Gold medal – first place	2010 Guadalajara	Individual

Jake Kaminski (born August 11, 1988) is an American archer.

== Personal life ==
Kaminski was born in Buffalo, New York and grew up in Elma, New York. As of August 2016, he resides in Gainesville, Florida. When not at home, he has resided in Chula Vista, California at the U.S. Olympic Training Center since 2006 to develop his archery skills.

== Archery career ==
Kaminski started his archery career at the age of six near his hometown of Elma, New York, focusing on compound shooting at a Junior Olympic Development Club. By the age of 15, he focused his attention on recurve archery so he could one day compete in the Olympics. At the 2012 Summer Olympics he competed for the U.S. in the Men's team event and won a silver Olympic medal along with his teammates Brady Ellison and Jacob Wukie. At the 2016 Summer Olympics, he once again competed for the United States in the Men's team event and took home another silver Olympic medal, alongside teammates Brady Ellison and Zach Garrett.
