= Chen Yu-cheng =

Taiwanese archer (born 1992)

Chen Yu-Cheng (陳宥辰; born 6 October 1992, in Taipei City) is a Taiwanese male archer. At the 2012 Summer Olympics he competed for his country in the Men's team event.

Yu-cheng secured a spot on the Chinese Taipei team for the 2020 Tokyo Olympic Games. He performed well at three selection tournaments that took place prior to the Olympics but was not able to attain a medal.
