= Oh Jin-hyek =

South Korean archer (born 1981)

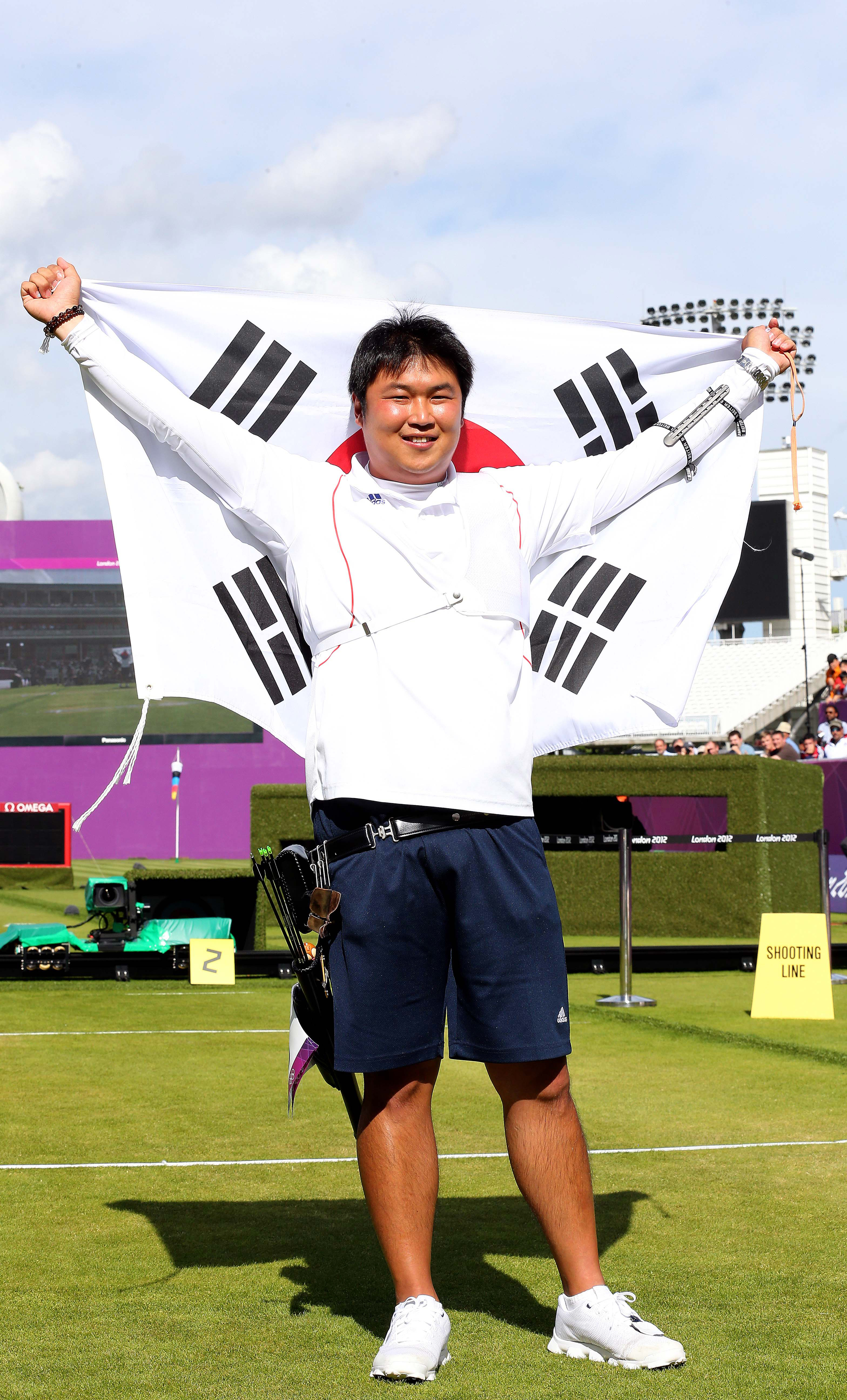
- Oh in 2012

Personal information
- Born: 15 August 1981 (age 45) Chungnam, South Korea
- Height: 182 cm (6 ft 0 in)
- Weight: 100 kg (220 lb)
Medal record
Men's recurve archery
Representing South Korea
Olympic Games
Gold medal – first place	2012 London	Individual
Gold medal – first place	2020 Tokyo	Team
Bronze medal – third place	2012 London	Team
World Championships
Gold medal – first place	2009 Ulsan	Team
Gold medal – first place	2011 Turin	Team
Gold medal – first place	2013 Belek	Mixed team
Gold medal – first place	2015 Copenhagen	Team
Gold medal – first place	2021 Yankton	Team
Silver medal – second place	1999 Riom	Team
Silver medal – second place	2011 Turin	Individual
Silver medal – second place	2013 Belek	Individual
Bronze medal – third place	2017 Mexico City	Team
World Cup Final
Gold medal – first place	2011 Istanbul	Mixed team
Gold medal – first place	2013 Paris	Individual
Gold medal – first place	2013 Paris	Mixed team
Asian Games
Gold medal – first place	2010 Guangzhou	Team
Gold medal – first place	2014 Incheon	Individual
Gold medal – first place	2022 Hangzhou	Team
Silver medal – second place	2018 Jakarta	Team
Bronze medal – third place	2014 Incheon	Team
Asian Championships
Gold medal – first place	2019 Bangkok	Team
Bronze medal – third place	2007 Xi'an	Team

Oh Jin-hyek (Korean: 오진혁; Korean pronunciation: [o.dʑin.ɦjʌk̚,], Hanja: 吳真爀; born 15 August 1981) is a South Korean archer. Oh first competed for the Korean national team in 1999, but did not win a major individual international tournament until he won the gold medal in the Men's individual event at the 2012 Summer Olympics, also becoming the first Korean male archer to win an Olympic individual gold medal.

== Career ==
With partners Im Dong-hyun and Kim Bub-min, he also finished in third place in the Men's team event. He was the world number one ranked archer from April 2013 to June 2014, winning the individual gold medal at the 2013 Archery World Cup Final and two individual silver medals at the 2011 and 2013 World Championships.

Oh competes for the Hyundai Steel corporate archery team and is known for his distinctive dynamic technique.

Oh won the Men's Team Gold Medal at the 2020 Summer Olympics for Team South Korea. Oh was the 3rd seed in the Olympics Men's Individual but lost in the Round of 16 to Indian archer Atanu Das.

== Individual performance timeline ==
Tournament	2009	2010	2011	2012	2013	2014	SR
World Archery tournaments
Olympic Games				W			1/1
World Championships	4th		2nd		2nd		0/3
World Cup							
Stage 1	QF		QF	3R	W		1/4
Stage 2			2nd	4R	W	2nd	1/4
Stage 3	QF	2nd				QF	0/3
Stage 4	2nd	3R			4th		0/3
World Cup Final	DNQ	DNQ	QF	DNQ	W	QF	1/3
End of year world ranking	5	6	3	2	1	2	
