= Dai Xiaoxiang =

Chinese archer (born 1990)

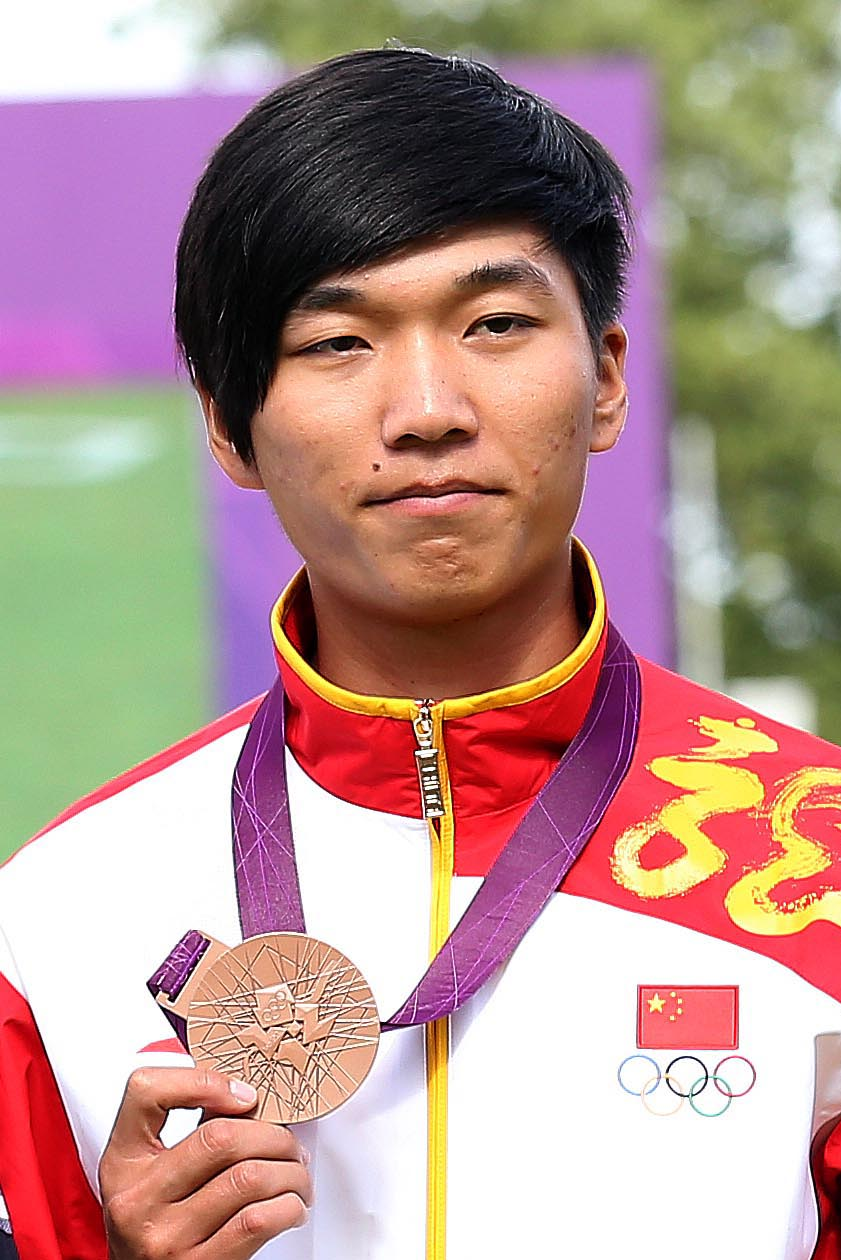
- Dai Xiaoxiang on the podium at the 2012 Summer Olympics with his bronze medal

Personal information
- Born: December 15, 1990 (age 35) Xiamen
- Height: 178 cm (5 ft 10 in)
- Weight: 70 kg (154 lb)
Medal record
Men's archery
Representing China
Olympic Games
| Bronze medal – third place | 2012 London | Individual |
World Cup
| Silver medal – second place | 2011 Istanbul | Individual |
| Silver medal – second place | 2013 Paris | Individual |
Asian Games
| Silver medal – second place | 2010 Guangzhou | Team |

Dai Xiaoxiang (Chinese: 戴小祥; pinyin: Dài Xiǎoxiáng; born December 15, 1990, in Xiamen) is a Chinese archer. At the 2012 Summer Olympics he won the bronze medal for his country in the Men's individual event.
