= Archery at the 2008 Summer Olympics – Women's individual =

Women's individual at the Games of the XXIX Olympiad
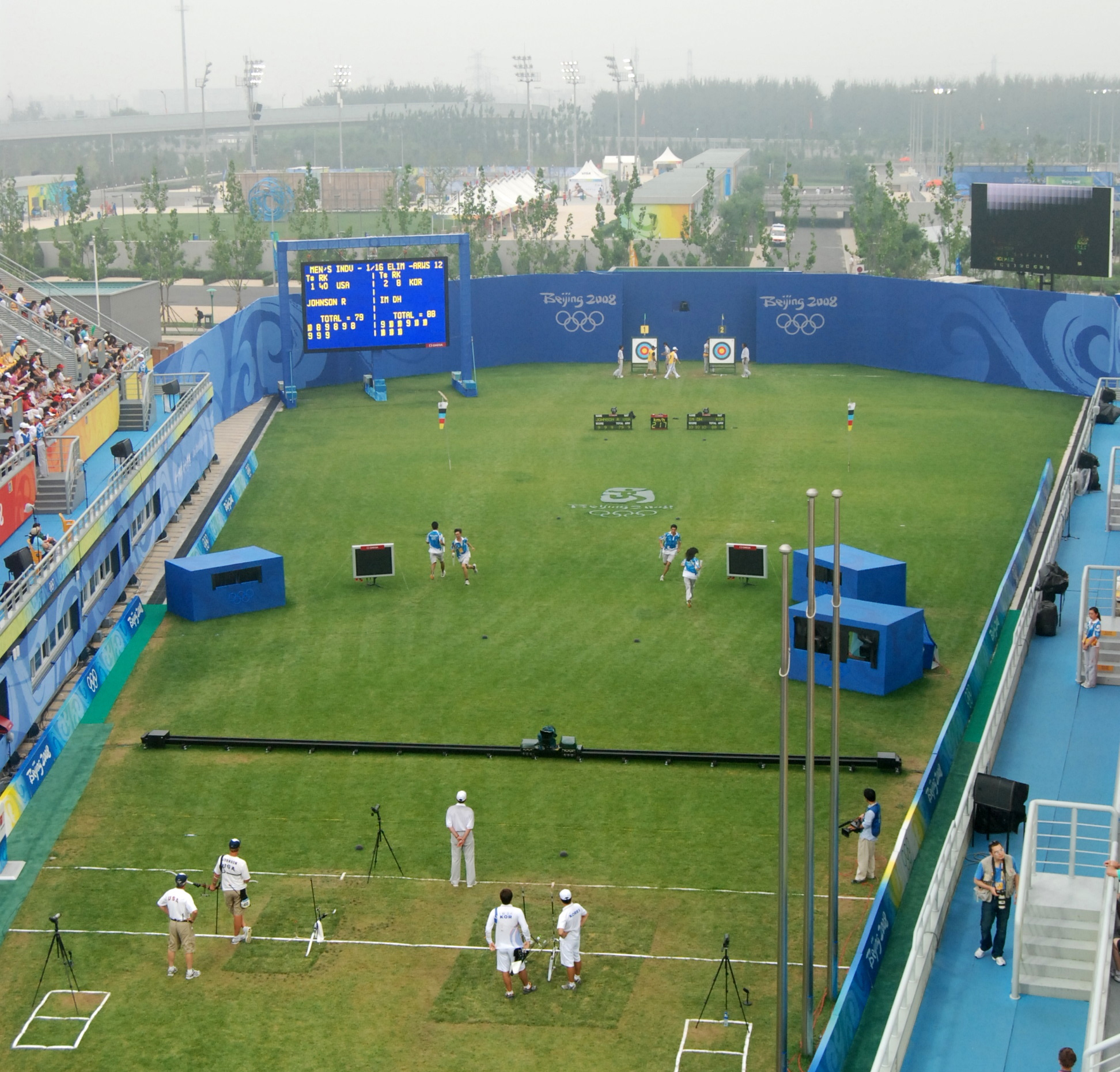
- The Olympic Green Archery Field, where the event took place, during the 2008 Summer Olympics.
- Venue: Olympic Green Archery Field
- Dates: 9–15 August 2008
- Competitors: 64 from 35 nations
- Winning score: 110

Medalists
1st place, gold medalist(s)		Zhang Juanjuan	China
2nd place, silver medalist(s)		Park Sung-hyun	South Korea
3rd place, bronze medalist(s)		Yun Ok-Hee	South Korea

The women's individual archery event at the 2008 Summer Olympics was part of the archery programme. It took place at the Olympic Green Archery Field. Ranking Round was on 9 August 2008. First and second elimination rounds took place on 12 August, and eights, quarterfinal, semifinals and medals matches were on 14 August. All archery was done at a range of 70 metres, with targets 1.22 metres in diameter.

Park Sung-hyun tried to defend her Olympic Gold Medal won in Athens, along with British Alison Williamson, winner of the bronze medal in 2004.

64 archers from 37 countries qualified for the event at the Beijing Olympics. The 44th Outdoor Archery World championship, held in Leipzig, Germany, plus 5 continental qualification tournaments and a Final World Qualification Tournament selected 61 slots for the event, along with 3 Tripartite Commission Invitations.

The competition began with the ranking round. Each archer fired 72 arrows. This round was done entirely to seed the elimination brackets; all archers moved on to them. The elimination rounds used a single-elimination tournament, with fixed brackets based on the ranking round seeding. In each round of elimination, the two archers in each match fired 12 arrows; the archer with the higher score advanced to the next round while the other archer was eliminated. Unlike in previous years, in which the first three rounds used an 18-arrow match, the 12-arrow match was used throughout the 2008 tournament.

The Chinese archer Zhang Juanjuan defeated South Korean Park Sung-hyun by a margin of 1 point, ending the Koreans' dominance in the women's individual archery event, which dated back to the 1984 Summer Olympics.

== Schedule ==
All times are China Standard Time (UTC+8)

Date	Time	Round
Saturday, 9 August 2008	12:00-14:00	Ranking Round
Tuesday, 12 August 2008	10:00-12:35; 15:30-18:05	Round of 64, Round of 32
Thursday, 14 August 2008	10:30-12:15	Round of 16
Thursday, 14 August 2008	16:00-16:52	Quarterfinals
Thursday, 14 August 2008	16:52-17:20	Semifinals
Thursday, 14 August 2008	17:21-17:50	Finals

== Records ==
Prior to this competition, the existing world and Olympic records were as follows.

- 72 arrow ranking round

World record	Park Sung-hyun (KOR)	682	Athens, Greece	12 August 2004
Olympic record	Lina Herasymenko (UKR)	673	Atlanta, United States	31 July 1996

- 12 arrow match

World record	Yun Ok-hee (KOR)	119	Antalya, Turkey	29 May 2008
Olympic record	Kim Soo-Nyung (KOR)	114	Barcelona, Spain	1 August 1992

The following new world and Olympic records were set during this competition.

Date	Record	Round	Name	Nationality	Score	OR	WR
14 August	12 arrow match	Round of 16	Park Sung-hyun	South Korea	115	OR	

== Ranking Round ==
Rank	Archer	Nation	1st Half	2nd Half	10s	Xs	Score
1	Park Sung-hyun	South Korea	336	337	34	12	673
2	Yun Ok-Hee	South Korea	336	331	30	14	667
3	Joo Hyun-Jung	South Korea	339	325	32	10	664
4	Khatuna Narimanidze	Georgia	330	333	28	12	663
5	Kwon Un Sil	North Korea	324	332	32	9	656
6	Yuan Shu Chi	Chinese Taipei	334	318	23	7	652
7	Alison Williamson	Great Britain	325	326	22	3	651
8	Naomi Folkard	Great Britain	329	322	21	6	651
9	Nami Hayakawa	Japan	326	323	22	9	649
10	Ana Rendón	Colombia	319	328	22	6	647
11	Natalia Erdyniyeva	Russia	324	323	21	11	647
12	Aida Román	Mexico	319	327	24	5	646
13	Małgorzata Ćwienczek	Poland	323	322	27	10	645
14	Bérengère Schuh	France	323	322	24	9	645
15	Chen Ling	China	330	315	18	7	645
16	Zekiye Keskin Satir	Turkey	317	327	21	6	644
17	Kristine Esebua	Georgia	332	311	24	5	643
18	Natalia Sánchez	Colombia	328	315	20	5	643
19	Justyna Mospinek	Poland	321	322	16	6	643
20	Mariana Avitia	Mexico	328	313	22	6	641
21	Viktoriya Koval	Ukraine	318	323	20	6	641
22	Laishram Bombaya Devi	India	319	318	22	9	637
23	Miroslava Dagbaeva	Russia	318	319	18	2	637
24	Jennifer Nichols	United States	320	317	15	6	637
25	Guo Dan	China	322	314	21	8	636
26	Khatuna Lorig	United States	319	316	18	9	635
27	Zhang Juanjuan	China	323	312	16	10	635
28	Jane Waller	Australia	312	322	21	7	634
29	Wu Hui Ju	Chinese Taipei	320	314	19	5	634
30	Natalia Valeeva	Italy	316	318	14	2	634
31	Dola Banerjee	India	319	314	20	8	633
32	Sophie Dodemont	France	313	319	13	2	632
33	Anja Hitzler	Germany	318	311	17	7	629
34	Marie-Pier Beaudet	Canada	319	309	18	6	628
35	Anastassiya Bannova	Kazakhstan	320	308	16	6	628
36	Leidys Brito	Venezuela	311	317	16	3	628
37	Pranitha Vardhineni	India	321	306	18	3	627
38	Tetyana Berezhna	Ukraine	314	313	13	5	627
39	Virginie Arnold	France	310	316	22	7	626
40	Charlotte Burgess	Great Britain	312	311	13	3	623
41	Ika Yuliana Rochmawati	Indonesia	313	308	12	4	621
42	Rina Dewi Puspitasari	Indonesia	317	303	19	6	620
43	Iwona Marcinkiewicz	Poland	308	312	13	5	620
44	Barbora Horáčková	Czech Republic	313	307	12	4	620
45	Son Hye Yong	North Korea	308	310	11	4	618
46	Sayoko Kitabatake	Japan	317	299	17	5	616
47	Katsiaryna Muliuk	Belarus	311	305	14	2	616
48	Yuki Hayashi	Japan	306	310	13	4	616
49	Elpida Romantzi	Greece	309	305	17	5	614
50	Evangelia Psarra	Greece	308	305	19	9	613
51	Pia Carmen Lionetti	Italy	310	303	18	7	613
52	Louise Laursen	Denmark	295	310	13	5	605
53	Veronique D'Unienville	Mauritius	304	301	13	3	605
54	Nathalie Dielen	Switzerland	289	312	13	4	601
55	Elena Tonetta	Italy	300	295	10	6	595
56	Elena Mousikou	Cyprus	293	296	10	4	589
57	Soha Abed Elaal	Egypt	289	298	9	1	587
58	Wei Pi-Hsiu	Chinese Taipei	291	294	10	1	585
59	Lexie Feeney	Australia	294	286	9	4	580
60	Najmeh Abtin	Iran	278	290	12	6	568
61	Dorji Dema	Bhutan	283	284	8	2	567
62	Sigrid Romero	Colombia	279	272	8	1	551
63	Albina Kamaletdinova	Tajikistan	294	253	10	7	547
64	Khadija Abbouda	Morocco	270	269	7	4	539

== Competition bracket ==
=== Section 1 ===
Round of 64
1	Park Sung-hyun (KOR)	112
64	Khadija Abbouda (MAR)	80
33	Anja Hitzler (GER)	107
32	Sophie Dodemont (FRA)	106
17	Kristine Esebua (GEO)	102^{9}
48	Yuki Hayashi (JPN)	102^{8}
49	Elpida Romantzi (GRE)	105
16	Zekiye Keskin Satir (TUR)	103
9	Nami Hayakawa (JPN)	112
56	Elena Mousikou (CYP)	103
41	Ika Yuliana Rochmawati (INA)	101
24	Jennifer Nichols (USA)	114
25	Guo Dan (CHN)	104
40	Charlotte Burgess (GBR)	106
57	Soha Abed Elaal (EGY)	95
8	Naomi Folkard (GBR)	107

Round of 32
1	Park Sung-hyun (KOR)	112
33	Anja Hitzler (GER)	107
17	Kristine Esebua (GEO)	102^{9}
49	Elpida Romantzi (GRE)	102^{10}
9	Nami Hayakawa (JPN)	105
24	Jennifer Nichols (USA)	103
40	Charlotte Burgess (GBR)	96
8	Naomi Folkard (GBR)	110

Round of 16
1	Park Sung-hyun (KOR)	115 (OR)
49	Elpida Romantzi (GRE)	103
9	Nami Hayakawa (JPN)	106
8	Naomi Folkard (GBR)	97

Quarterfinals
1	Park Sung-hyun (KOR)	112
9	Nami Hayakawa (JPN)	103

=== Section 2 ===
Round of 64
5	Kwon Un Sil (PRK)	106
60	Najmeh Abtin (IRI)	96
37	Pranitha Vardhineni (IND)	106
28	Jane Waller (AUS)	100
21	Viktoriya Koval (UKR)	109
44	Barbora Horáčková (CZE)	107
53	Veronique D'Unienville (MRI)	97
12	Aida Román (MEX)	108
13	Małgorzata Sobieraj-Ćwienczek (POL)	113
52	Louise Laursen (DEN)	100
45	Son Hye Yong (PRK)	107
20	Mariana Avitia (MEX)	112
29	Wu Hui Ju (TPE)	98
36	Leidys Brito (VEN)	104
61	Dorji Dema (BHU)	97
4	Khatuna Narimanidze (GEO)	107

Round of 32
5	Kwon Un Sil (PRK)	106
37	Pranitha Vardhineni (IND)	99
21	Viktoriya Koval (UKR)	105
12	Aida Román (MEX)	111
13	Małgorzata Sobieraj-Ćwienczek (POL)	109
20	Mariana Avitia (MEX)	110
36	Leidys Brito (VEN)	98
4	Khatuna Narimanidze (GEO)	111

Round of 16
5	Kwon Un Sil (PRK)	105
12	Aida Román (MEX)	100
20	Mariana Avitia (MEX)	109
4	Khatuna Narimanidze (GEO)	108

Quarterfinals
5	Kwon Un Sil (PRK)	105
20	Mariana Avitia (MEX)	99

=== Section 3 ===
Round of 64
3	Joo Hyun-Jung (KOR)	108
62	Sigrid Romero (COL)	98
35	Anastassiya Bannova (KAZ)	105
30	Natalia Valeeva (ITA)	107
19	Justyna Mospinek (POL)	101
46	Sayoko Kitabatake (JPN)	103
51	Pia Carmen Lionetti (ITA)	107
14	Bérengère Schuh (FRA)	112
11	Natalia Erdyniyeva (RUS)	107
54	Nathalie Dielen (SUI)	102
43	Iwona Marcinkiewicz (POL)	103
22	Laishram Bombaya Devi (IND)	101
27	Zhang Juanjuan (CHN)	109
38	Tetyana Berezhna (UKR)	97
59	Lexie Feeney (AUS)	101
6	Yuan Shu Chi (TPE)	104

Round of 32
3	Joo Hyun-Jung (KOR)	110
30	Natalia Valeeva (ITA)	108
46	Sayoko Kitabatake (JPN)	100
14	Bérengère Schuh (FRA)	112
11	Natalia Erdyniyeva (RUS)	104
43	Iwona Marcinkiewicz (POL)	103
27	Zhang Juanjuan (CHN)	110
6	Yuan Shu Chi (TPE)	105

Round of 16
3	Joo Hyun-Jung (KOR)	109
14	Bérengère Schuh (FRA)	104
11	Natalia Erdyniyeva (RUS)	98
27	Zhang Juanjuan (CHN)	110

Quarterfinals
3	Joo Hyun-Jung (KOR)	101
27	Zhang Juanjuan (CHN)	106

=== Section 4 ===
Round of 64
7	Alison Williamson (GBR)	108
58	Wei Pi-Hsiu (TPE)	99
39	Virginie Arnold (FRA)	105
26	Khatuna Lorig (USA)	107
23	Miroslava Dagbaeva (RUS)	106^{10}
42	Rina Dewi Puspitasari (INA)	106^{9}
55	Elena Tonetta (ITA)	106^{9}
10	Ana Rendón (COL)	106^{10}
15	Chen Ling (CHN)	110
50	Evangelia Psarra (GRE)	101
47	Katsiaryna Muliuk (BLR)	104
18	Natalia Sánchez (COL)	101
31	Dola Banerjee (IND)	109^{8}
34	Marie-Pier Beaudet (CAN)	109^{10}
63	Albina Kamaletdinova (TJK)	102
2	Yun Ok-Hee (KOR)	109

Round of 32
7	Alison Williamson (GBR)	109
26	Khatuna Lorig (USA)	112
23	Miroslava Dagbaeva (RUS)	106
10	Ana Rendón (COL)	110
15	Chen Ling (CHN)	106
47	Katsiaryna Muliuk (BLR)	105
34	Marie-Pier Beaudet (CAN)	107
2	Yun Ok-Hee (KOR)	114

Round of 16
26	Khatuna Lorig (USA)	107
10	Ana Rendón (COL)	95
15	Chen Ling (CHN)	103
2	Yun Ok-Hee (KOR)	113

Quarterfinals
26	Khatuna Lorig (USA)	105
2	Yun Ok-Hee (KOR)	111

=== Finals ===
Semifinals
Park Sung-hyun (KOR)	109
Kwon Un Sil (PRK)	106
Zhang Juanjuan (CHN)	115
Yun Ok-Hee (KOR)	109

Final
Park Sung-hyun (KOR)	109
Zhang Juanjuan (CHN)	110
Bronze medal match
Kwon Un Sil (PRK)	106
Yun Ok-Hee (KOR)	109

Rank	Athlete	1	2	3	4	5	6	7	8	9	10	11	12	Total	Note
1st place, gold medalist(s)	Zhang Juan Juan (CHN)	10	7	9	9	9	9	10	9	10	10	9	9	110	Gold Medal Match
2nd place, silver medalist(s)	Park Sung-hyun (KOR)	9	10	10	8	8	10	9	8	9	10	8	10	109	Gold Medal Match
3rd place, bronze medalist(s)	Yun Ok-Hee (KOR)	9	9	10	9	9	9	9	9	9	10	9	8	109	Bronze Medal Match
4	Kwon Un Sil (PRK)	8	10	9	9	10	9	8	8	9	9	8	9	106	Bronze Medal Match
