= 2007 World Archery Championships – Women's individual recurve =

The women's individual recurve competition at the 2007 World Archery Championships took place in July 2007 in Leipzig, Germany. 144 archers entered the competition. Following a qualifying FITA round, the top 128 archers qualified for the 7-round knockout round, drawn according to their qualification round scores. The semi-finals and finals then took place on 15 July.

The competition doubled as qualification for the 2008 Olympic competition. Natalia Valeeva was the first non-Korean champion since her previous Championship victory, representing Moldova, in 1995.

== Qualifying ==
The following archers were the leading 16 qualifiers:

1. (South Korea) Park Sung-hyun (2nd place)
2. (Italy) Natalia Valeeva (Champion)
3. (South Korea) Choi Eun-young (4th round)
4. (Japan) Nami Hayakawa (3rd round)
5. (France) Bérengère Schuh (3rd round)
6. (Chinese Taipei) Shen Hsiao-chun (Quarterfinal)
7. (China) Zhang Juanjuan (Quarterfinal)
8. (United Kingdom) Naomi Folkard (3rd round)
9. (Poland) Justyna Mospinek (Quarterfinal)
10. (South Korea) Lee Tuk-young (4th round)
11. (Belarus) Viktoriya Koval (4th round)
12. (Ukraine) Tetyana Berezhna (4th round)
13. (Russia) Tatyana Boroday (3rd round)
14. (Russia) Natalya Erdyniyeva (3rd place)
15. (China) Guo Dan (4th round)
16. (Japan) Sayoko Kitabatake (3rd round)

== Draw ==
=== Top Half ===
==== Section 1 ====
1st round
1	(South Korea) Park Sung-hyun	113
128	(Malaysia) Irza Hanie Abu Samah	104
65	(Belgium) Sabrina Struyf	100
64	(Belarus) Katsiarina Muliuk	106
33	(United States) Karen Scavotto	107
96	(Malaysia) Taip Noor Aziera	96
97	(Spain) Magali Foulon	100
32	(India) Bombayla Devi Laishram	104
17	(Poland) Małgorzata Ćwienczek	108
112	(Australia) Jordanna Wellings	90
81	(Iran) Houmat Heidari	94
48	(Venezuela) Lisbeth Leoni	104
49	(Turkey) Natalia Nasaridze	106
80	(Moldova) Olga Buliga	101
113	(Bhutan) Kiba	95
16	(Japan) Sayoko Kitabatake	105

2nd round
1	(South Korea) Park Sung-hyun	114
64	(Belarus) Katsiarina Muliuk	105
33	(United States) Karen Scavotto	103
32	(India) Bombayla Devi Laishram	105
17	(Poland) Małgorzata Ćwienczek	106
48	(Venezuela) Lisbeth Leoni	105
49	(Turkey) Natalia Nasaridze	101
16	(Japan) Sayoko Kitabatake	108

3rd round
1	(South Korea) Park Sung-hyun	107
32	(India) Bombayla Devi Laishram	95
17	(Poland) Małgorzata Ćwienczek	109
16	(Japan) Sayoko Kitabatake	102

4th round
1	(South Korea) Park Sung-hyun	113
17	(Poland) Małgorzata Ćwienczek	104

==== Section 2 ====
1st round
9	(Poland) Justyna Mospinek	105
120	(Estonia) Anneli Preimann	100
73	(Czech Republic) Gabriela Sudrichova	104
56	(Greece) Anita-Avi Atlas	101
41	(Denmark) Louise Laursen	106
88	(Moldova) Ecaterina Buliga	104
105	(Iran) Shahrzad Allahyari	94
24	(United Kingdom) Charlotte Burgess	100
25	(North Korea) Kwon Un-sil	109
104	(Slovakia) Kristina Melicharova	100
89	(Hungary) Dolores Cekada	93
40	(Turkey) Begul Lukluoglu	97
57	(Belarus) Hanna Marusava	100
72	(Turkey) Selma Kaya	101
121	(Romania) Corina Curelar	97
8	(United Kingdom) Naomi Folkard	109

2nd round
9	(Poland) Justyna Mospinek	106
73	(Czech Republic) Gabriela Sudrichova	99
41	(Denmark) Louise Laursen	107
24	(United Kingdom) Charlotte Burgess	109
25	(North Korea) Kwon Un-sil	109
40	(Turkey) Begul Lukluoglu	101
72	(Turkey) Selma Kaya	93
8	(United Kingdom) Naomi Folkard	101

3rd round
9	(Poland) Justyna Mospinek	105
24	(United Kingdom) Charlotte Burgess	89
25	(North Korea) Kwon Un-sil	108
8	(United Kingdom) Naomi Folkard	103

4th round
9	(Poland) Justyna Mospinek	110
25	(North Korea) Kwon Un-sil	108

==== Section 3 ====
1st round
5	(France) Bérengère Schuh	109
124	(Puerto Rico) Nadya Ruiz	105
69	(Ukraine) Tetyana Dorokhova	97
60	(Greece) Elpida Romantzi	102
37	(Mexico) Aída Román	102
92	(Czech Republic) Barbora Horackova	99
101	(Bhutan) Dorji Dolma	103
28	(United States) Jennifer Nichols	104
21	(Poland) Iwona Marcinkiewicz	106
108	(Portugal) Maria-Joao Ribeiro	91
85	(Philippines) Anbarasi Subramaniam	101
44	(Chinese Taipei) Yuan Shu-chi	105
53	(Netherlands) Coby Hurkmans	109
76	(Venezuela) Vanessa Chacon	103
117	(Tajikistan) Fatima Tagoeva	97
12	(Ukraine) Tetyana Berezhna	108

2nd round
5	(France) Bérengère Schuh	109
60	(Greece) Elpida Romantzi	106
37	(Mexico) Aída Román	103
28	(United States) Jennifer Nichols	107
21	(Poland) Iwona Marcinkiewicz	108
44	(Chinese Taipei) Yuan Shu-chi	101
53	(Netherlands) Coby Hurkmans	108
12	(Ukraine) Tetyana Berezhna	110

3rd round
5	(France) Bérengère Schuh	101
28	(United States) Jennifer Nichols	105
21	(Poland) Iwona Marcinkiewicz	101
12	(Ukraine) Tetyana Berezhna	106

4th round
28	(United States) Jennifer Nichols	110
12	(Ukraine) Tetyana Berezhna	105

==== Section 4 ====
1st round
13	(Russia) Tatyana Boroday	106
116	(Mexico) Mariana Avitia	90
77	(Czech Republic) Martina Mackova	98
52	(Germany) Christina Schaefer	105
45	(France) Sophie Dodemont	101
84	(Mongolia) Tamir Amarjargal	91
109	(Cyprus) Panagiota Georgiou	96
20	(Chinese Taipei) Wu Hui-ju	104
29	(Italy) Pia Carmen Lionetti	108
100	(Belgium) Kim Verhoeven	104
93	(Belgium) Sylvia Geyskens	99^{6}
36	(Georgia (country)) Khatuna Narimanidze	99^{10}
61	(Australia) Jane Waller	105
68	(Georgia (country)) Asmat Diasamidze	95
125	(El Salvador) Claudia Landaverde	93
4	(Japan) Nami Hayakawa	108

2nd round
13	(Russia) Tatyana Boroday	105
52	(Germany) Christina Schaefer	97
45	(France) Sophie Dodemont	109
20	(Chinese Taipei) Wu Hui-ju	106
29	(Italy) Pia Carmen Lionetti	101
36	(Georgia (country)) Khatuna Narimanidze	102
61	(Australia) Jane Waller	100
4	(Japan) Nami Hayakawa	112

3rd round
13	(Russia) Tatyana Boroday	103
45	(France) Sophie Dodemont	106
36	(Georgia (country)) Khatuna Narimanidze	107
4	(Japan) Nami Hayakawa	104

4th round
45	(France) Sophie Dodemont	101
36	(Georgia (country)) Khatuna Narimanidze	105

=== Bottom Half ===
==== Section 5 ====
1st round
3	(South Korea) Choi Eun-young	111
126	(Egypt) Fadia Ismail	93
67	(Latvia) Zane Berzina	105
62	(Sweden) Elin Kattstrom	101
35	(Kazakhstan) Anastassiya Bannova	105
94	(Tajikistan) Albina Kamaletdinova	100
99	(Austria) Sabine Mayrhofer	101
30	(Australia) Alexandra Feeney	105
19	(China) Chen Ling	107
110	(Uzbekistan) Munira Nurmanova	97
83	(Canada) Kateri Vrakking	100
46	(Kazakhstan) Olga Pilipova	89
51	(Mongolia) Bishindeegiin Urantungalag	106
78	(Belarus) Katsiarina Milanovich	85
115	(El Salvador) Claudia Duenas	88
14	(Russia) Natalya Erdyniyeva	111

2nd round
3	(South Korea) Choi Eun-young	111
67	(Latvia) Zane Berzina	104
35	(Kazakhstan) Anastassiya Bannova	104
30	(Australia) Alexandra Feeney	103
19	(China) Chen Ling	106
83	(Canada) Kateri Vrakking	101
51	(Mongolia) Bishindeegiin Urantungalag	95
14	(Russia) Natalya Erdyniyeva	102

3rd round
3	(South Korea) Choi Eun-young	105
35	(Kazakhstan) Anastassiya Bannova	98
19	(China) Chen Ling	94
14	(Russia) Natalya Erdyniyeva	99

4th round
3	(South Korea) Choi Eun-young	102
14	(Russia) Natalya Erdyniyeva	111

==== Section 6 ====
1st round
11	(Ukraine) Viktoriya Koval	100
118	(Romania) Luminita Sarbu	94
75	(Kazakhstan) Victoria Belosliudtseva	99
54	(Mexico) Janeth Garcia	104
43	(North Korea) Ri Kkoch-sun	104
86	(Spain) Gema Buitron	84
107	(Mongolia) Dambadarjaa Dulamsuren	97
22	(United States) Lindsey Pian	102
27	(Russia) Viktoria Dubanova	107
102	(Latvia) Ieva Ciparsone	100
91	(Cyprus) Elena Mousikou	96
38	(Georgia (country)) Kristina Esebua	106
59	(Japan) Haruyo Sakurazawa	105
70	(Bhutan) Dorji Dema	99
123	(Dominican Republic) Ludys Tejada	88
6	(Chinese Taipei) Shen Hsiao-chun	100

2nd round
11	(Ukraine) Viktoriya Koval	108
54	(Mexico) Janeth Garcia	104
43	(North Korea) Ri Kkoch-sun	108
22	(United States) Lindsey Pian	99
27	(Russia) Viktoria Dubanova	105^{8}
38	(Georgia (country)) Kristina Esebua	105^{9}
59	(Japan) Haruyo Sakurazawa	97
6	(Chinese Taipei) Shen Hsiao-chun	108

3rd round
11	(Ukraine) Viktoriya Koval	101^{10;9}
43	(North Korea) Ri Kkoch-sun	101^{10;8}
38	(Georgia (country)) Kristina Esebua	94
6	(Chinese Taipei) Shen Hsiao-chun	107

4th round
11	(Ukraine) Viktoriya Koval	99^{9}
6	(Chinese Taipei) Shen Hsiao-chun	99^{10}

==== Section 7 ====
1st round
7	(China) Zhang Juanjuan	112
122	(Lithuania) Ringa Baltrusaite	93
71	(Venezuela) Leidys Brito	100
58	(Canada) Marie-Pier Beaudet	106
39	(El Salvador) Almudena Gallardo	96
90	(Netherlands) Femke Boonen	101
103	(Philippines) Rachelle Anne Cabral	101
26	(Colombia) Ana Rendón	99
23	(United Kingdom) Alison Williamson	103
106	(Brazil) Sara Nikitin	102
87	(Colombia) Sigrid Romero	102
42	(Colombia) Natalia Sánchez	105
55	(Germany) Veronika Haidn Tschalova	107
74	(Switzerland) Nathalie Dielen	90
119	(Republic of Ireland) Sinead Cuthbert	91
10	(South Korea) Lee Tuk-young	111

2nd round
7	(China) Zhang Juanjuan	111
58	(Canada) Marie-Pier Beaudet	105
90	(Netherlands) Femke Boonen	102
103	(Philippines) Rachelle Anne Cabral	97
23	(United Kingdom) Alison Williamson	103
42	(Colombia) Natalia Sánchez	104
55	(Germany) Veronika Haidn Tschalova	98
10	(South Korea) Lee Tuk-young	107

3rd round
7	(China) Zhang Juanjuan	112
90	(Netherlands) Femke Boonen	102
42	(Colombia) Natalia Sánchez	96
10	(South Korea) Lee Tuk-young	103

4th round
7	(China) Zhang Juanjuan	105
10	(South Korea) Lee Tuk-young	103

==== Section 8 ====
1st round
15	(China) Guo Dan	108
114	(Estonia) Siret Luik	101
79	(Romania) Simona Bancila	104^{8}
50	(India) Dola Banerjee	104^{7}
47	(Italy) Elena Tonetta	108
82	(Estonia) Bessi Kasak	97
111	(Hungary) Szilvia Bekasine Molnar	99
18	(India) Chekrovolu Swuro	103
31	(France) Virginie Arnold	109
98	(Chile) Denisse van Lamoen	101
95	(Canada) Kristen Niles	104
34	(North Korea) Kim Yong-ok	107
63	(Germany) Anja Hitzler	102
66	(Iran) Najmeh Abtin	98
127	(Bulgaria) Belmin Hasan	103
2	(Italy) Natalia Valeeva	107

2nd round
15	(China) Guo Dan	109
79	(Romania) Simona Bancila	99
47	(Italy) Elena Tonetta	108
18	(India) Chekrovolu Swuro	105
31	(France) Virginie Arnold	100
34	(North Korea) Kim Yong-ok	98
63	(Germany) Anja Hitzler	105
2	(Italy) Natalia Valeeva	106

3rd round
15	(China) Guo Dan	101
47	(Italy) Elena Tonetta	99
31	(France) Virginie Arnold	82
2	(Italy) Natalia Valeeva	107

4th round
15	(China) Guo Dan	102
2	(Italy) Natalia Valeeva	110

== Finals ==
Quarterfinals
1	(South Korea) Park Sung-hyun	114
9	(Poland) Justyna Mospinek	99
28	(United States) Jennifer Nichols	110
36	(Georgia (country)) Khatuna Narimanidze	107
14	(Russia) Natalya Erdyniyeva	107
6	(Chinese Taipei) Shen Hsiao-chun	106
7	(China) Zhang Juanjuan	106
2	(Italy) Natalia Valeeva	108

Semifinals
1	(South Korea) Park Sung-hyun	111
28	(United States) Jennifer Nichols	97
14	(Russia) Natalya Erdyniyeva	101
2	(Italy) Natalia Valeeva	109

Finals
1	(South Korea) Park Sung-hyun	106
2	(Italy) Natalia Valeeva	108
Third place
28	(United States) Jennifer Nichols	105
14	(Russia) Natalya Erdyniyeva	106
