= 2007 World Archery Championships – Women's team recurve =

The women's team recurve competition at the 2007 World Archery Championships took place from July 2007 in Leipzig, Germany. 38 teams of 3 archers took part in the women's recurve qualification round, and the 16 teams with the highest cumulative totals qualified for the 4-round knockout round, drawn according to their qualification round scores. The semi-finals and finals then took place on 14 July.

== Seeds ==
Seedings were based on the combined total of the team members' qualification scores in the individual ranking rounds. The top 16 teams were assigned places in the draw depending on their overall ranking.

1. (South Korea) Choi Eun-young / Lee Tuk-young / Park Sung-hyun (champions)
2. (China) Chen Ling / Guo Dan / Zhang Juanjuan (quarterfinal)
3. (Poland) Małgorzata Ćwienczek / Iwona Marcinkiezicz / Justyna Mospinek (quarterfinal)
4. (United Kingdom) Charlotte Burgess / Naomi Folkard / Alison Williamson (3rd place)
5. (Russia) Tatyana Boroday / Viktoria Dubanova / Natalya Erdyniyeva (1st round)
6. (Italy) Pia Carmen Lionetti / Elena Tonetta / Natalia Valeeva (4th place)
7. (Chinese Taipei) Shen Hsiao-chun / Wu Hui-ju / Yuan Shu-chi (2nd place)
8. (Japan) Nami Hayakawa / Sayoko Kitabatake / Haruyo Sakurazawa (1st round)
9. (France) Virginie Arnold / Sophie Dodemont / Bérengère Schuh (quarterfinal)
10. (Ukraine) Tetyana Berezhna / Tetyana Dorokhova / Viktoriya Koval (1st round)
11. (United States) Jennifer Nichols / Lindsey Pian / Karen Scavotto (1st round)
12. (India) Dola Banerjee / Bombayla Devi Laishram / Chekrovolu Swuro (quarterfinal)
13. (North Korea) Kim Yong-ok / Kwon Un-sil / Ri Kkoch-sun (1st round)
14. (Georgia (country)) Asmat Diasamidze / Kristina Esebua / Khatuna Narimanidze (1st round)
15. (Kazakhstan) Anastassiya Bannova / Victoria Belosliudtseva / Olga Pilipova (1st round)
16. (Colombia) Ana Rendón / Sigrid Romero / Natalia Sánchez (1st round)

== Draw ==
1st round
1	South Korea	211
16	Colombia	205
9	France	205
8	Japan	193
5	Russia	198
12	India	206
13	North Korea	194^{24;26}
4	United Kingdom	194^{24;27}
3	Poland	198^{25}
14	Georgia	198^{23}
11	United States	198
6	Italy	203
7	Chinese Taipei	205
10	Ukraine	199
15	Kazakhstan	195
2	China	211

Quarterfinals
1	South Korea	210
9	France	188
12	India	196
4	United Kingdom	210
3	Poland	197^{23}
6	Italy	197^{26}
7	Chinese Taipei	194
2	China	192

Semifinals
1	South Korea	216
4	United Kingdom	213
6	Italy	212
7	Chinese Taipei	215

Finals
1	South Korea	226
7	Chinese Taipei	221
Third place
4	United Kingdom	213
6	Italy	210
