= Archery at the 2008 Summer Olympics – Women's team =

Women's team at the Games of the XXIX Olympiad
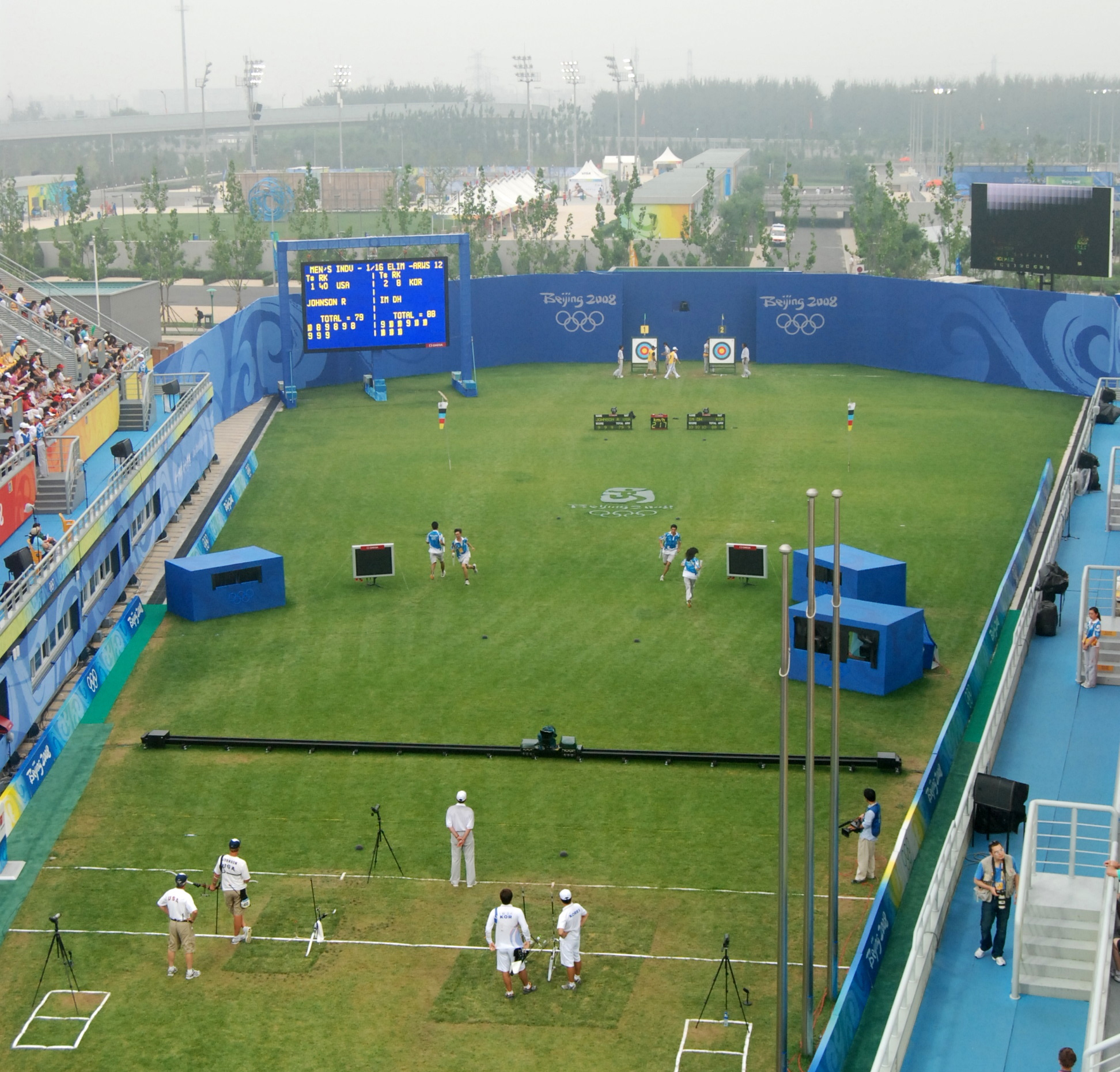
- The Olympic Green Archery Field, where the event took place, during the 2008 Summer Olympics.
- Venue: Olympic Green Archery Field
- Dates: 9–10 August 2008
- Competitors: 30 from 10 nations
- Winning score: 224

Medalists
1st place, gold medalist(s)		Park Sung-hyun; Yun Ok-Hee; Joo Hyun-Jung	South Korea
2nd place, silver medalist(s)		Chen Ling; Guo Dan; Zhang Juanjuan	China
3rd place, bronze medalist(s)		Bérengère Schuh; Sophie Dodemont; Virginie Arnold	France

The Women's team archery event at the 2008 Summer Olympics was part of the archery programme and took place at the Olympic Green Archery Field. Ranking Round was scheduled for August 9 and elimination rounds and Finals took place on August 10. All archery is done at a range of 70 metres, with targets 1.22 metres in diameter.

As the defending Olympic champions, South Korea defended the title with only one remaining archer from the previous Games, Park Sung-hyun, winner of two gold medals. China, silver at the last Games, participated at the team event with only one Athens medalist, Zhang Juanjuan and tried to bring the gold medal to the hosts. Chinese Taipei, bronze in Athens, brought Yuan Shu Chi and Wu Hui Ju back to the Games.

10 teams qualified for the event at the Beijing Olympics: host China, plus the top 8 teams at the 44th Outdoor Archery World championship, held in Leipzig, Germany, and one other NOC that qualified three athletes for the Games.

The competition begins with the same ranking round used to determine the individual event seeding. Each archer fires 72 arrows, with the scores of the team's three members summed to give the team score. The elimination rounds use a single-elimination tournament, with fixed brackets based on the ranking round seeding. Highly ranked teams get byes through to the quarterfinals. In each round of elimination, the two teams each fire 24 arrows (with each individual archer accounting for 8 of them). The higher scoring team moves on, while the lower scoring team is eliminated. The two semifinal losers face off for the bronze medal.

== Records ==
Prior to this competition, the existing world and Olympic records were as follows. The change from the prior 27 arrow match to a 24 arrow match for the XXIX Olympiad meant that there was no standing Olympic record in the team match.

- 216 arrow ranking round

World record	South Korea; Park Sung-hyun, Lee Sung-Jin, Yun Mi-Jin	2030	Athens, Greece	12 August 2004
Olympic record	South Korea; Kim Soo-Nyung, Kim Nam-Soon, Yun Mi-Jin	1994	Sydney, Australia	16 September 2000

- 24 arrow match

World record	South Korea; Lee Tuk-Young, Yun Ok-Hee, Yun Mi-Jin	228	Shanghai	29 September 2006
Olympic record	New record classification	–	–	–

The following new world and Olympic records were set during this competition.

Date	Record	Round	Name	Nationality	Score	OR	WR
9 August	216 arrow ranking round	Ranking Round	Park Sung-hyun; Yun Ok-Hee; Joo Hyun-Jung	South Korea	2004	OR	
10 August	24 arrow match	First Round	Natalia Valeeva; Pia Carmen Maria Lionetti; Elena Tonetta	Italy	215	OR	
10 August	24 arrow match	Quarterfinals	Bérengère Schuh; Sophie Dodemont; Virginie Arnold	France	218	OR	
10 August	24 arrow match	Quarterfinals	Park Sung-hyun; Yun Ok-Hee; Joo Hyun-Jung	South Korea	231	OR	WR

== World rankings entering Olympics ==
Rank	Team
1	South Korea
2	Great Britain
3	China
4	Italy
5	Poland
7	Chinese Taipei
11	India
13	Japan
15	France
17	Colombia

== Ranking Round ==
Rank	Team	1st Half	2nd Half	10s	Xs	Score
1	South Korea	1011	993	96	36	2004 OR
1	Park Sung-hyun	336	337	34	12	673
1	Yun Ok-Hee	336	331	30	14	667
1	Joo Hyun-Jung	339	325	32	10	664
2	Great Britain	983	959	56	12	1925
2	Alison Williamson	325	326	22	3	651
2	Naomi Folkard	329	322	21	6	651
2	Charlotte Burgess	312	311	13	3	623
3	China	975	941	55	25	1916
3	Chen Ling	330	315	18	7	645
3	Guo Dan	322	314	21	8	636
3	Zhang Juanjuan	323	312	16	10	635
4	Poland	952	956	56	21	1908
4	Małgorzata Ćwieńczek	323	322	27	10	645
4	Justyna Mospinek	321	322	16	6	643
4	Iwona Marcinkiewicz	308	312	13	5	620
5	France	946	957	59	18	1903
5	Bérengère Schuh	323	322	24	9	645
5	Sophie Dodemont	313	319	13	2	632
5	Virginie Arnold	310	316	22	7	626
6	India	959	938	60	20	1897
6	Laishram Bombaya Devi	319	318	22	9	637
6	Dola Banerjee	319	314	20	8	633
6	Pranitha Devi	321	306	18	3	627
7	Japan	949	932	52	18	1881
7	Nami Hayakawa	326	323	22	9	649
7	Sayoko Kitabatake	317	299	17	5	616
7	Yuki Hayashi	306	310	13	4	616
8	Chinese Taipei	945	926	52	13	1871
8	Yuan Shu Chi	334	318	23	7	652
8	Wu Hui Ju	320	314	19	5	634
8	Wei Pi-Hsiu	291	294	10	1	585
9	Italy	926	916	42	15	1842
9	Natalia Valeeva	316	318	14	2	634
9	Pia Carmen Maria Lionetti	310	303	18	7	613
9	Elena Tonetta	300	295	10	6	595
10	Colombia	926	915	50	12	1841
10	Ana Rendón	319	328	22	6	647
10	Natalia Sánchez	328	315	20	5	643
10	Sigrid Romero	279	272	8	1	551

== Elimination round ==
First Round
8	Chinese Taipei	211
9	Italy	215
7	Japan	206
10	Colombia	199

Quarterfinals
1	South Korea	231 (WR)
9	Italy	217
5	France	218
4	Poland	211
3	China	211
6	India	206
7	Japan	196
2	Great Britain	201

Semifinals
1	South Korea	213
5	France	184
3	China	208
2	Great Britain	202

Finals
1	South Korea	224
3	China	215
Third place
5	France	203
2	Great Britain	201

== Final standings ==
Rank	Team
Gold medal	South Korea
Silver medal	China
Bronze medal	France
4	Great Britain
5	Italy
6	Poland
7	India
8	Japan
9	Chinese Taipei
10	Colombia

== Final Match Details ==
Rank	Team Athletes	End	Arrows			Score
	South Korea	24-Match Total				224
	Joo Hyun-Jung; Yun Ok-Hee; Park Sung-hyun	1	9	9	9	27
	Joo Hyun-Jung; Yun Ok-Hee; Park Sung-hyun	1	8	9	10	27
	Joo Hyun-Jung; Yun Ok-Hee; Park Sung-hyun	2	10	10	9	29
	Joo Hyun-Jung; Yun Ok-Hee; Park Sung-hyun	2	9	9	10	28
	Joo Hyun-Jung; Yun Ok-Hee; Park Sung-hyun	3	10	10	8	28
	Joo Hyun-Jung; Yun Ok-Hee; Park Sung-hyun	3	9	9	10	28
	Joo Hyun-Jung; Yun Ok-Hee; Park Sung-hyun	4	9	9	10	28
	Joo Hyun-Jung; Yun Ok-Hee; Park Sung-hyun	4	10	9	10	29
	China	24-Match Total				215
	Chen Ling; Guo Dan; Zhang Juan Juan	1	9	7	10	26
	Chen Ling; Guo Dan; Zhang Juan Juan	1	10	8	8	26
	Chen Ling; Guo Dan; Zhang Juan Juan	2	9	8	10	27
	Chen Ling; Guo Dan; Zhang Juan Juan	2	9	9	9	27
	Chen Ling; Guo Dan; Zhang Juan Juan	3	10	9	10	29
	Chen Ling; Guo Dan; Zhang Juan Juan	3	8	7	9	24
	Chen Ling; Guo Dan; Zhang Juan Juan	4	9	10	9	28
	Chen Ling; Guo Dan; Zhang Juan Juan	4	9	10	9	28
