= Archery at the 2008 Summer Olympics =

Archery at the Games of the XXIX Olympiad
- Venue: Olympic Green Archery Field
- Dates: 9–15 August 2008
- No. of events: 4 (2 men, 2 women)
- Competitors: 128 from 49 nations

At the 2008 Summer Olympics, the Archery competitions were held between 9 August and 15 August, at the Olympic Green Archery Field, a temporary venue on the Olympic Green, Beijing's Olympic Park.

== Competition format ==
Both men and women have the same size targets (1.22 m) and stand the same distance away from their target (70 m). The score for each arrow is determined by how close to the center of the target it hits, with a score of 10 for hitting directly in the center, down to 0 points if the target is missed entirely or the archer fails to shoot within the time limit of 40 seconds per arrow. Medals were awarded in four events: Men's Individual, Women's Individual, Men's Team, and Women's Team.

=== Individual ===
64 archers compete in both the men's and women's individual competition. A preliminary ranking round is held at 70 m, where each archer shoots 72 arrows (in six ends, or groups, of 12 arrows). The resulting score is used to seed the archers into a single elimination bracket.

Unlike in Athens, the archers who win the first round of the individual competition, will compete immediately in the following round, without waiting for the general conclusion of the eliminations. The order of shooting will be given by the placement of the archers after the ranking round. The archers shoot 12 arrows in ends of 3 arrows.

=== Team ===
Each country that has three archers in the individual competition may also compete in the team competition. The scores from the individual ranking round are summed to determine the team score that is used to seed the teams in a single elimination bracket. Matches consist of each team shooting 24 arrows (in Athens they shot 27) in 4 ends of 6 arrows, with each archer on the team shooting 8 arrows.

== Qualification ==
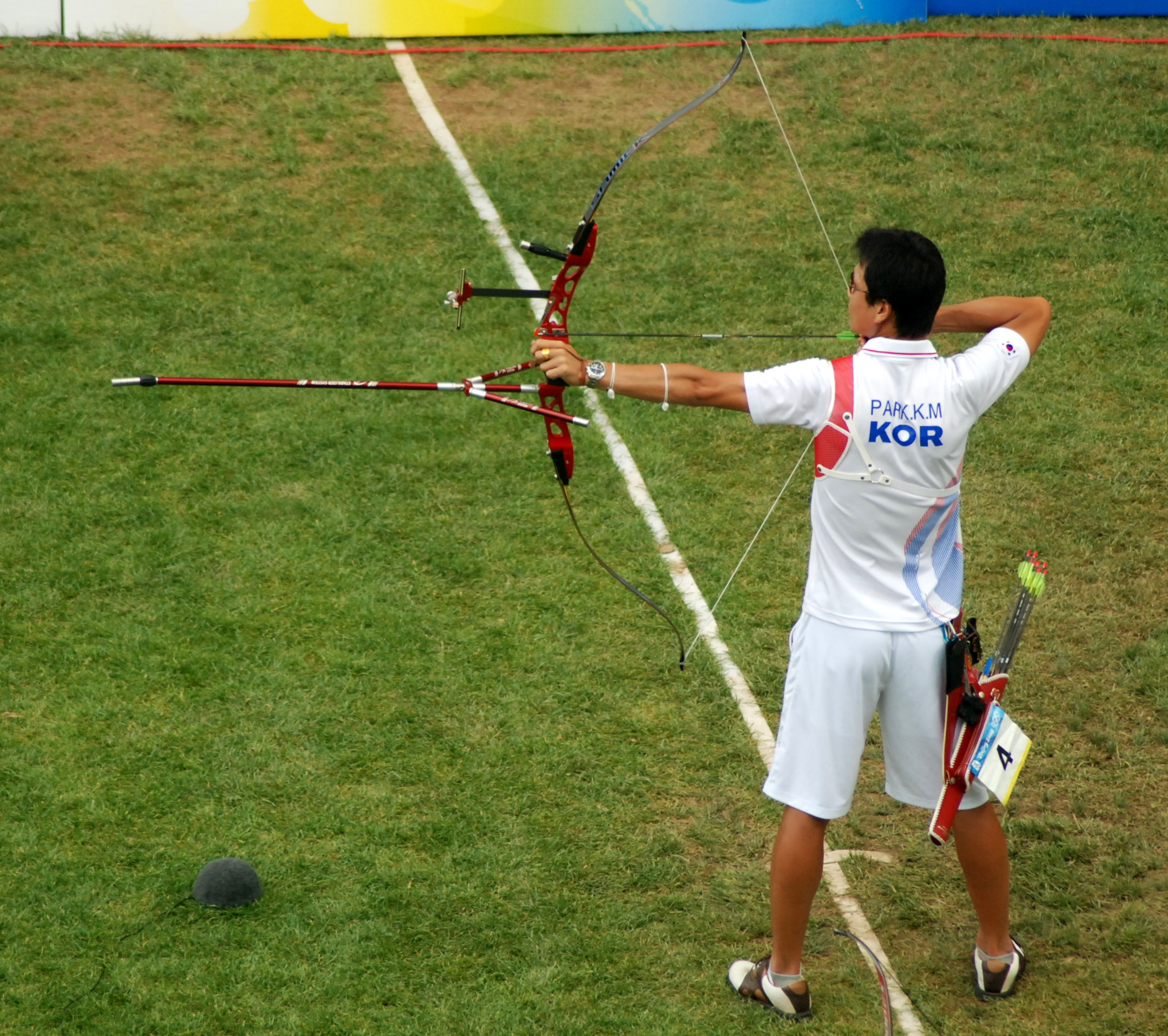
Park Kyung-Mo

The athlete quota for archery is 128 athletes, 64 men and 64 women. Each National Olympic Committee (NOC) can have up to a maximum of six athletes, three per gender. NOC's with three athletes of the same gender automatically qualify for the team competition. Athletes do not qualify themselves directly into the Olympics. They can only earn qualification spots for their respective NOC's. The NOC's, in turn, decide which of the athletes who have achieved the MQS (Minimum Qualification Score) they select. The MQS for FITA rounds are 1200 (men) and 1180 (women). For 70m rounds they are 600 (men) and 590 (women). Athletes who wish to qualify for the Olympics need to achieve the MQS in the period starting from 5 July 2007 until 16 July 2008.

Host nation China qualified 3 athletes per gender automatically when they participated with the same number of athletes at the 2007 World Outdoor Target Championships in Leipzig. At these championships another 80 spots were given to NOCs. The top 8 nations per gender (apart from China) in the team competition qualified with 3 athletes for the Olympics. Sixteen spots per gender were given to the NOCs with the highest ranked athletes who had not yet qualified through the team competition, with a maximum of 2 athletes per NOC.

Archers can also qualify through Continental Qualification Tournaments. Archers who have already earned qualification spots for their NOC as well as nations that don't belong to the continental area may not participate in these Continental Championships. Three spots will be allocated to Asia, Europe and Pan America, while Africa and Oceania both receive 2 spots per gender. At these tournaments there is a maximum of 2 athletes per NOC.

A special tournament called the Final World Qualification Tournament will be held between nations that not have won any quota places through other tournaments. They can qualify a maximum of one athlete per gender per NOC. This tournament will be held from 23 June 2008 until 29 June 2008. Three remaining spots per gender will be allocated by a commission of IOC and FITA members to nations who have submitted athletes but did not yet qualify.

The following is a list of qualification events:

31 December 2006, FITA publishes the calendar and locations of the Continental Qualification Tournaments.
5 July 2007, start of the Minimum Qualification Score period.
5–15 July 2007, 2007 World Outdoor Target Championships, Leipzig, Germany.
14–19 September 2007, Asian Championships, Xi'an, China.
9–13 October 2007, PanAmerica Continental Qualification Tournament, San Salvador, El Salvador.
5–11 January 2008, New Zealand Championships & Oceania Qualification, Wellington, New Zealand.
7–10 February 2008, African Championships, Cairo, Egypt.
12–19 May 2008, European Championships, Vittel, France.
23 June 2008 - 29 June 2008, Final World Qualification Tournament, Boé, France.
16 July 2008, end of the Minimum Qualification Score period.
18 July 2008, FITA reallocated unused quota places.
TBC, The commission will confirm the invitational places to NOC's.

== Participating nations ==
128 archers from 49 nations took part.

- Australia (5)
- Bhutan (2)
- Belarus (2)
- Brazil (1)
- Bulgaria (1)
- Canada (4)
- China (4)
- Colombia (3)
- Cuba (1)
- Cyprus (1)
- Czech Republic (2)
- Denmark (2)
- Egypt (2)
- Finland (1)
- France (5)
- Georgia (2)
- Great Britain (6)
- Greece (2)
- India (1)
- Indonesia (2)
- Iran (2)
- Italy (6)
- Japan (5)
- Kazakhstan (1)
- Malaysia (3)
- Mauritius (1)
- Mexico (4)
- Morocco (1)
- Myanmar (1)
- North Korea (2)
- Philippines (1)
- Poland (6)
- Portugal (1)
- Qatar (1)
- Romania (1)
- Russia (5)
- Samoa (1)
- South Africa (1)
- South Korea (6)
- Spain (1)
- Sweden (1)
- Switzerland (1)
- Chinese Taipei (6)
- Tajikistan (1)
- Turkey (2)
- Ukraine (5)
- United States (5)
- Venezuela (1)

== Medal summary ==
=== Medal table ===
Retrieved from Beijing Olympics 2008 Official Website.

Rank	Nation	Gold	Silver	Bronze	Total
1	South Korea	2	2	1	5
2	China	1	1	1	3
3	Ukraine	1	0	0	1
4	Italy	0	1	0	1
5	France	0	0	1	1
5	Russia	0	0	1	1
Totals (6 entries)		4	4	4	12

=== Men's ===
Event	Gold	Silver	Bronze
individual	Viktor Ruban; Ukraine	Park Kyung-Mo; South Korea	Bair Badenov; Russia
team	South Korea; Im Dong-Hyun; Lee Chang-Hwan; Park Kyung-Mo	Italy; Mauro Nespoli; Marco Galiazzo; Ilario Di Buò	China; Jiang Lin; Li Wenquan; Xue Haifeng

=== Women's ===
Event	Gold	Silver	Bronze
individual	Zhang Juanjuan; China	Park Sung-hyun; South Korea	Yun Ok-Hee; South Korea
team	South Korea; Park Sung-hyun; Yun Ok-Hee; Joo Hyun-Jung	China; Zhang Juanjuan; Chen Ling; Guo Dan	France; Virginie Arnold; Sophie Dodemont; Bérangère Schuh

== See also ==
- Archery at the 2008 Summer Paralympics
