= Guo Dan =

Guo Dan may refer to:

- Guo Dan (archer)
- Guo Dan (speed skater)
