= Archery at the 2010 Commonwealth Games – Women's recurve team =

The Women's recurve team event took place on 8 October 2010 at the Yamuna Sports Complex.

== Teams ==
Six teams participated in the competition:

| Seed | Country | Athletes |
|---|---|---|
| 1 | India | Dola Banerjee; Deepika Kumari; Bombayla Devi Laishram |
| 2 | England | Naomi Folkard; Amy Oliver; Alison Williamson |
| 3 | Australia | Deonne Bridger; Alexandra Feeney; Dawn Nelson |
| 4 | Singapore | Khang Cheok; Vanessa Loh; Wendy Tan |
| 5 | Malaysia | Shahira Abdul Halim; Anbarasi Subramaniam; Ng Sui Kim |
| 6 | Canada | Marie-Pier Beaudet; Alana Macdougall; Kateri Vrakking |

== Results ==
Quarter-finals
India
Bye
Malaysia | 205
Singapore | 200
Australia | 201
Canada | 205
Bye
England

Semi-finals
India | 213
Malaysia | 185
Canada | 200
England | 208

Final
India | 207
England | 206
Third place
Malaysia | 192
Canada | 202
