= Peter Stecher =

Austrian archer and writer (born 1965)

Peter Otto Stecher (born 1965 in Vienna, Austria, died March 17, 2026 in Lockenhaus) was an expert in archery. He was a published author on the subject, and he has toured the globe to perform in various archery events as "Bowman", including a slapstick routine with a character he calls "Barry Bowdini". Stecher lived in Lockenhaus, where in 1991 he founded the first archery club in the Burgenland state. Stecher is known as a classic bow purist, shooting every bow type, but prefers the simple straight American semi-longbow similar to the ones favored by Howard Hill.

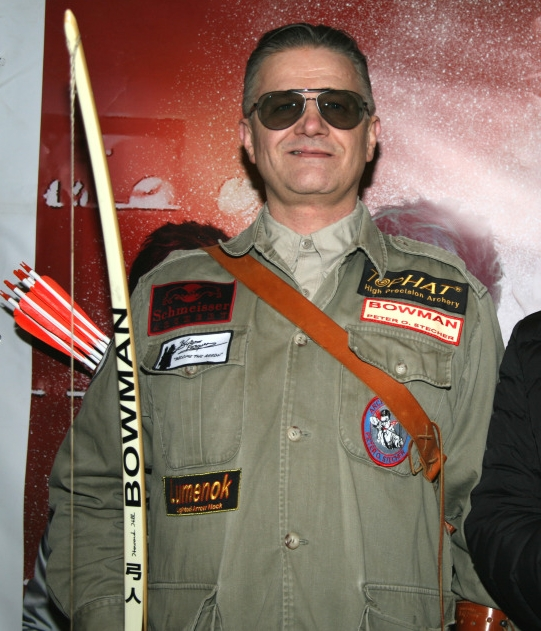
Peter Stecher in China in January 2015

Stecher's book, Legends in Archery - Adventurers with Bow and Arrow (Schiffer Publishing, 2010, ISBN 978-0764335754), began as a 2008 series of portraits of famous archers, for a German-language trade magazine. The book was then published in the German language in 2008, then more widely released in 2010, in English. One of the subjects of Stecher's book is American star archer, Byron Ferguson, who contacted Stecher, and the two bowmen became friends. Stecher has translated Ferguson's own book, Become the Arrow, into German. Stecher then completed a 20-minute DVD featuring trick shots and slow-motion imaging with a high-speed camera.

More recently, Stecher was invited to Nanjing as one of the seven best "Robin Hood" archers from around the world, to appear on a Chinese televised program featuring an archery competition, the first ever on popular Chinese broadcasting. The show, which aired on Jiangsu Broadcasting Corporation on 22 February 2015, was seen by 250 million Chinese viewers. One contestant was Chinese Olympic gold medalist, Zhang Juanjuan. The challenge was to shoot arrows at falling rings. In the end, Stecher shot to a draw with Zhang Juanjuan, each hitting seven falling rings out of fifteen opportunities.
