= Marie-Pier Beaudet =

Canadian archer (born 1986)

Personal information
- Born: December 12, 1986 (age 39) Quebec City, Quebec, Canada
- Height: 164 cm (5 ft 5 in)

Sport
- Country: Canada
- Sport: Archery
- Event: Recurve
Medal record
Women's Archery
Representing Canada
Pan American Games
Silver medal – second place	2007 Rio de Janeiro	Team recurve
Commonwealth Games
Bronze medal – third place	2010 Delhi	Team recurve

Marie-Pier Beaudet (born December 12, 1986) is a former Canadian archer who competed at three Summer Olympic Games between 2004 and 2012. Beaudet made her international debut in 2002, and in addition to the Olympic Games has contested the Pan American Games, in which she won a silver medal in 2007, and the Commonwealth Games, in which she earned a bronze medal in 2010.

== Career ==
Beaudet was born on December 12, 1986, in Quebec City, Quebec. She made her debut to the Canadian national team at the World Archery Youth Championships in 2002, and won her first international competition in Arizona that same year, a moment she reflected in 2015 as her greatest achievement.

Following the 2012 Summer Olympics Beaudet took a year's break from archery to prioritise her mental health, returning to the sport in 2014. Beaudet announced her retirement in 2015 to focus on her nursing studies at Cégep de Lévis-Lauzon.

Olympic Games

Beaudet's selection to represent Canada at the 2004 Summer Olympics made her the country's youngest ever Olympic archer at seventeen years old.

Beaudet won selection to the 2008 Summer Olympics in July 2008 after a successful appeal against the results of a national trial held in May, which Beaudet argued was not clarified prior to competition as the basis for Olympic selection. Beaudet entered the 2008 Games holding a world ranking of 53. She finished the preliminary 72-arrow ranking round, which determined the seedings for the elimination rounds, in thirty-fourth position and advanced to the second round of the women's individual event after a narrow opening round win against India's Dola Banerjee. Beaudet was eliminated by her second round opponent Yun Ok-hee of South Korea, who had earlier won gold medal in the women's team event.

Beaudet qualified for the Canadian Olympic team for the 2012 Summer Olympics shortly after winning a qualification spot for Canada in Medellín in April that year, having set a new Canadian national record points score of 1,340 from a maximum of 1,440 in the process. At the Games Beaudet concluded the ranking round in twenty-ninth position for the women's individual event with 645 points from a maximum of 720.

Pan American and Commonwealth Games

Beaudet won silver medal in the women's team recurve event the 2007 Pan American Games with teammates Kristen Niles and Kateri Vrakking, losing to Colombia in the final by two points. She was praised by the Canadian coach for adapting to shooting last in sequence within the team as opposed to her usual position as first.

In July 2010 Beaudet was announced as a member of the Canadian team for the 2010 Commonwealth Games in Delhi, where she won bronze medal in the women's team recurve event.

== See also ==
- Lucille Lemay – two-time Olympic archer for Canada (1972 and 1984) and Commonwealth bronze medalist (1982)
