= 2007 Asian Archery Championships =

International archery tournament

- Host city: Xi'an, China
- Dates: 14–20 September 2007

The 2007 Asian Archery Championships was the 15th edition of the event. It was held in Xi'an, China from 14 to 20 September 2007 and was organized by Asian Archery Federation.

== Medal summary ==
=== Recurve ===
Event	Gold	Silver	Bronze
Men's individual	Wang Cheng-pang; Chinese Taipei	Park Kyung-mo; South Korea	Mangal Singh Champia; India
Men's team	India; Rahul Banerjee; Mangal Singh Champia; Jayanta Talukdar	Malaysia; Cheng Chu Sian; Wan Khalmizam; Marbawi Sulaiman	South Korea; Kim Bo-ram; Oh Jin-hyek; Park Kyung-mo
Women's individual	Lee Sung-jin; South Korea	Guo Dan; China	Chen Ling; China
Women's team	South Korea; An Se-jin; Lee Sung-jin; Yun Ok-hee	Japan; Nami Hayakawa; Sayoko Kitabatake; Haruyo Sakurazawa	India; Dola Banerjee; Bombayla Devi Laishram; Chekrovolu Swuro

=== Compound ===
Event	Gold	Silver	Bronze
Men's individual	Earl Yap; Philippines	Kim Dong-kyu; South Korea	Reza Zamaninejad; Iran
Men's team	Iran; Majid Ahmadi; Parviz Sadeghi; Reza Zamaninejad	Chinese Taipei; Tsou Yung-ming; Wang Chih-hao; Wu Wen-shiung	Malaysia; Lau Siew Hong; Soo Teck Kim; Ting Leong Fong
Women's individual	Kwon Oh-hyang; South Korea	Jennifer Chan; Philippines	Jhano Hansdah; India
Women's team	Philippines; Jennifer Chan; Amaya Paz; Abbigail Tindugan	India; Bheigyabati Chanu; Jhano Hansdah; Manjudha Soy	Singapore; Maryanne Gul; Shirlene Lee; Jessie Wong

== Medal table ==
Rank	Nation	Gold	Silver	Bronze	Total
1	South Korea	3	2	1	6
2	Philippines	2	1	0	3
3	India	1	1	3	5
4	Chinese Taipei	1	1	0	2
5	Iran	1	0	1	2
6	China	0	1	1	2
6	Malaysia	0	1	1	2
8	Japan	0	1	0	1
9	Singapore	0	0	1	1
Totals (9 entries)		8	8	8	24
