= Aída Román =

Mexican archer (born 1988)

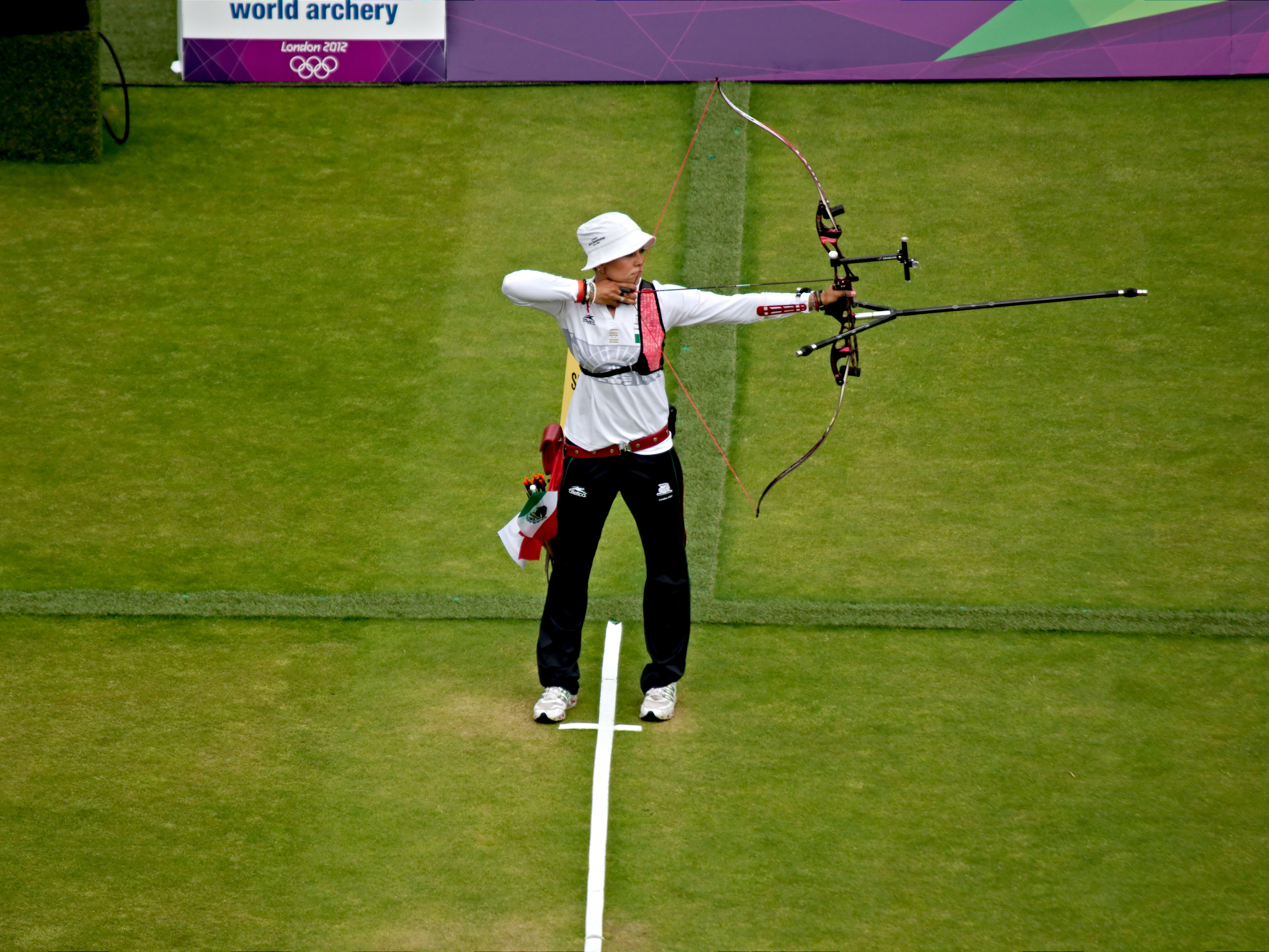
- Román at the 2012 Summer Olympics

Personal information
- Full name: Aída Nabila Román Arroyo
- Born: 21 May 1988 (age 38) Mexico City, Mexico
- Height: 5 ft 6 in (168 cm)
- Weight: 134 lb (61 kg)

Sport
- Country: Mexico
- Sport: Archery
- Event: Recurve
- Coached by: Song I-woo

Achievements and titles
- Highest world ranking: Number 10 in the world December 2015
Medal record
Women's recurve archery
Representing Mexico
Olympic Games
Silver medal – second place	2012 London	Individual
World Championships
Silver medal – second place	2011 Turin	Mixed team
Silver medal – second place	2017 Mexico City	Team
Silver medal – second place	2021 Yankton	Team
Bronze medal – third place	2023 Berlin	Team
World Cup
Gold medal – first place	2014 Lausanne	Individual
Gold medal – first place	2014 Wrocław	Mixed team
Gold medal – first place	2014 Lausanne	Mixed team
Gold medal – first place	2015 Wrocław	Mixed team
Gold medal – first place	2023 Antalya	Team
Silver medal – second place	2012 Ogden	Team
Silver medal – second place	2014 Shanghai	Mixed team
Silver medal – second place	2014 Wrocław	Team
Silver medal – second place	2017 Berlin	Team
Silver medal – second place	2018 Salt Lake City	Team
Silver medal – second place	2019 Antalya	Team
Silver medal – second place	2021 Guatemala City	Team
Silver medal – second place	2021 Lausanne	Team
Silver medal – second place	2021 Paris	Team
Bronze medal – third place	2011 Shanghai	Team
Bronze medal – third place	2013 Antalya	Mixed team
Bronze medal – third place	2014 Shanghai	Individual
Bronze medal – third place	2015 Shanghai	Mixed team
Bronze medal – third place	2016 Medellín	Team
World Indoor Championships
Gold medal – first place	2014 Nîmes	Individual
Pan American Games
Gold medal – first place	2011 Guadalajara	Team
Silver medal – second place	2007 Rio de Janeiro	Individual
Silver medal – second place	2015 Toronto	Team
Silver medal – second place	2019 Lima	Team
Silver medal – second place	2023 Santiago	Team
Bronze medal – third place	2011 Guadalajara	Individual
Pan American Championships
Gold medal – first place	2010 Guadalajara	Team
Gold medal – first place	2021 Monterrey	Team
Gold medal – first place	2022 Santiago	Team
Silver medal – second place	2010 Guadalajara	Individual
Silver medal – second place	2018 Medellín	Team
Central American and Caribbean Games
Gold medal – first place	2023 San Salvador	Team

Aída Nabila Román Arroyo (born 21 May 1988) is a Mexican archer. A three-time Olympian, she won a silver medal in the women's individual event at the 2012 Summer Olympics and was the women's World Indoor Archery Champion in 2014. She has additionally achieved medal finishes at the World Archery Championships, Archery World Cup, and Pan American Games.

== Career ==
=== 2007–2011: Continental successes and Olympic debut ===
Román first won selection to the Mexico national team in 2007 when she was chosen to compete in that year's Pan American Games, where she won a silver medal.

Román made her Olympic debut at the 2008 Summer Olympics in Beijing, contesting the women's individual event as one of two Mexicans in the field alongside Mariana Avitia. Román finished the event's 72-arrow ranking round with a total score of 646 points, earning the 12th seed for the subsequent knock-out rounds. Following victories over Veronique D'Unienville of Mauritius and Viktoriya Koval of Ukraine in the first two elimination rounds, she was defeated by North Korea's Kwon Un-Sil in the third round after scoring poorly in the final quarter of the 12-arrow contest. Speaking with the media following her loss a tearful Román was unable to explain her drop in accuracy, though in an interview four years later she reflected that she had lacked the mental strength to handle the pressure of competing for a spot in the quarter-finals.

Román was the most decorated female athlete at the 2010 Central American Games, winning seven gold medals and one silver medal. The following year she triumphed alongside Mariana Avitia and Alejandra Valencia at the 2011 Pan American Games, winning Mexico's first gold medal in the women's team event.

=== 2012: Olympic silver medalist ===
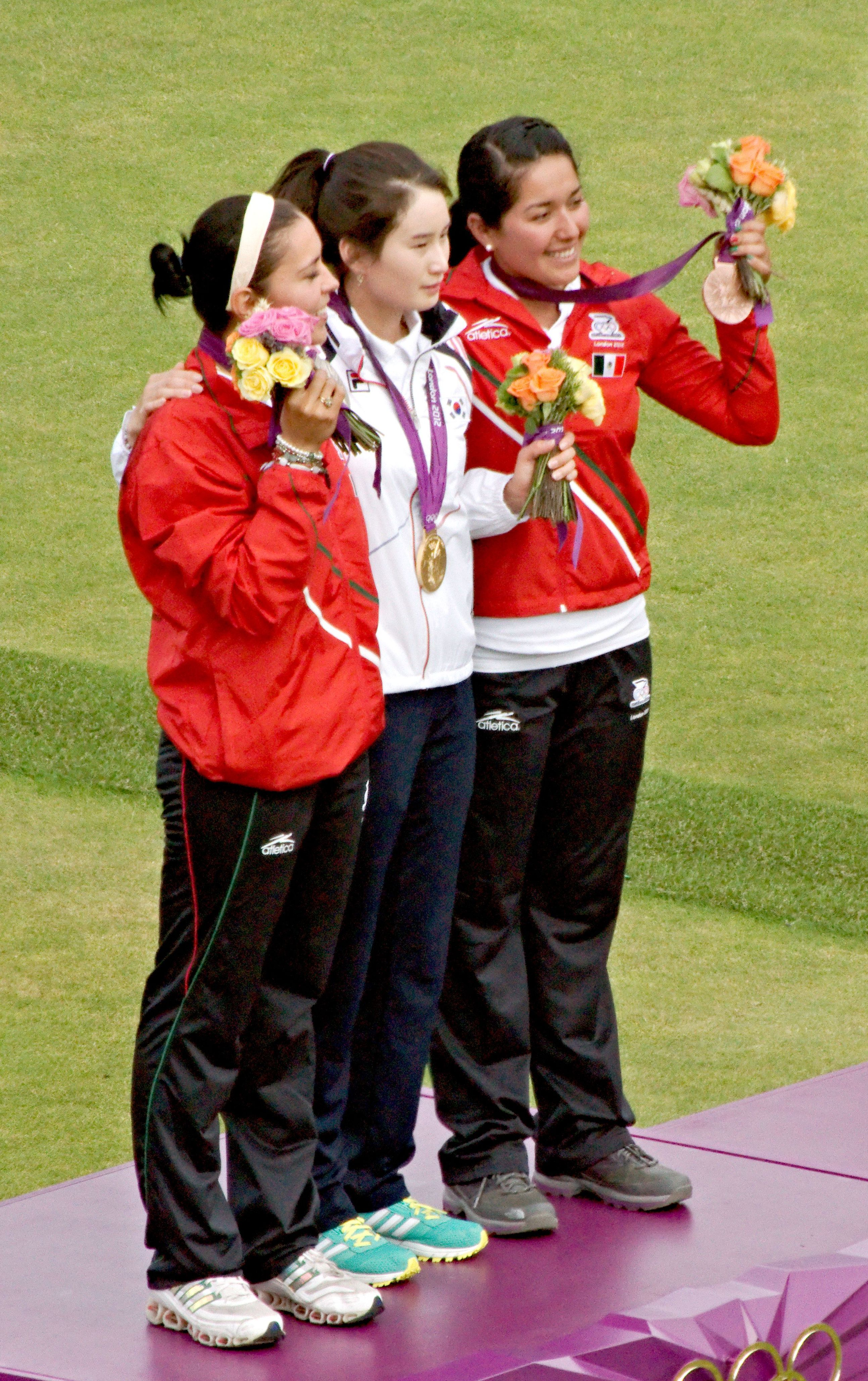
Román (left) with Ki Bo-bae and Mariana Avitia during the women's individual medal ceremony at the 2012 Summer Olympics

Román was selected to compete at the 2012 Summer Olympics in London, entering both the women's individual and women's team events with Avitia and Valencia. After scoring 658 points in the 72-arrow ranking round Román was seeded eleventh for the elimination rounds of the individual event, and her score, combined with those of Avitia and Valencia, earned Mexico the fourth seed for the team competition.

Although Román and her teammates were eliminated from the team event at the quarter-final stage by Japan, she made steady progress in the individual event, winning her first four matches to set up a semi-final against Avitia, who had delivered an upset against South Korea's Lee Sung-jin in the quarter-finals. Their encounter ensured Mexico its first Olympic archery medal, with the winner guaranteed at least a silver medal by contesting the final. Román defeated her younger teammate to win by six set points to four, setting up a tie in the gold medal match with Lee's compatriot Ki Bo-bae.

The gold medal final between Román and Ki was a close match, and after five sets the pair were tied, necessitating a one-arrow shoot-off. Ki matched Román in shooting into the 8-ring of the target, but the South Korean's arrow was determined to be marginally closer to the centre of the target, earning her the gold medal. With Avitia's earlier bronze medal success in the third-place playoff match, Román's silver medal marked the first time since the 1984 Summer Olympics that Mexican athletes had shared the podium in any Olympic discipline and the first time ever that it had been achieved by Mexican women.

2016 Summer Olympics

At the 2016 Summer Olympics, Román reached the second round of the individual event and was on the Mexican team that reached the quarterfinals.

Post-Olympics Success

In 2021, she won the silver medal in the women's team event at the 2021 World Archery Championships held in Yankton, South Dakota, United States.

== Individual performance timeline ==
Tournament	2007	2008	2009	2010	2011	2012	2013	2014	2015	SR
Competitor for	Mexico									
World Archery tournaments
Olympic Games		3R				2nd				0/2
World Championships	2R		2R		2R		3R		QF	0/5
World Cup Final	DNQ	DNQ	DNQ	DNQ	DNQ	DNQ	QF	W		1/2
End of year world ranking	23	18	16	14	22	3	6	12		
