= Veronique Marrier D'Unienville =

Mauritian archer (born 1967)

Personal information
- Nationality: Mauritian
- Born: 18 July 1967 (age 58) Floréal, Plaines Wilhems, Mauritius

Sport
- Country: Mauritius
- Sport: Archery

Veronique Marrier D'Unienville-Le Vieux (born 18 July 1967) is an athlete from Mauritius who competes in archery.

At the 2008 Summer Olympics in Beijing Marrier D'Unienville finished her ranking round with a total of 605 points. This gave her the 53rd seed for the final competition bracket in which she faced Aida Román in the first round. The archer from Mexico was too strong and won the confrontation with 108-97, eliminating Marrier D'Unienville straight away.
