= Zhang Juanjuan =

Chinese archer (born 1981)

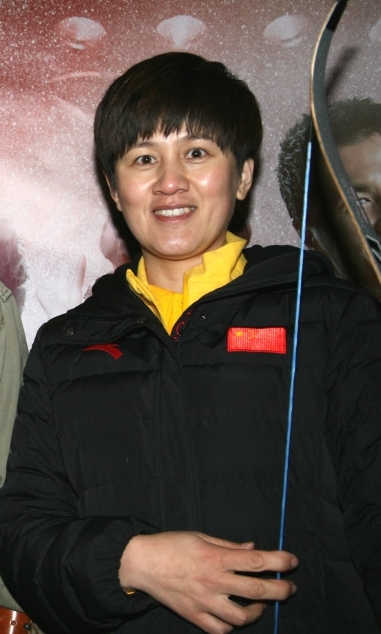
- Zhang pictured in 2015

Personal information
- Nationality: Chinese
- Born: 2 January 1982 (age 44) Qingdao, Shandong, People's Republic of China
- Height: 169 cm (5 ft 7 in)

Sport
- Sport: Archery
- Event: Recurve archery
Medal record
Women's recurve archery
Representing China
Olympic Games
| Gold medal – first place | 2008 Beijing | Individual |
| Silver medal – second place | 2004 Athens | Team |
| Silver medal – second place | 2008 Beijing | Team |
World Championships
| Gold medal – first place | 2001 Beijing | Team |
Asian Games
| Silver medal – second place | 2006 Doha | Team |
| Bronze medal – third place | 2002 Busan | Team |
Asian Championships
| Gold medal – first place | 2005 New Delhi | Team |

Zhang Juanjuan (simplified Chinese: 张娟娟; traditional Chinese: 張娟娟; pinyin: Zhāng Juānjuān; born 2 January 1981 in Qingdao, Shandong, People's Republic of China) is an archer from the People's Republic of China.

== Early and personal life ==
Zhang was born on 2 January 1982 in the Chinese city of Qingdao in Shandong Province. Before taking up archery Zhang trained in shot put, javelin and discus.

She married in 2009 and had a child in 2010. As of 2015 she worked as the deputy director of an archery centre in her native Qingdao.

== Records and world competition ==
=== 2004 Summer Olympics ===
Zhang represented China at the 2004 Summer Olympics. She was placed 5th in the women's individual ranking round with a 72-arrow score of 663. In the first round of elimination, she faced 60th-ranked Aurore Trayan of France. Zhang defeated Trayan 135-122 in the 18-arrow match to advance to the round of 32. In that round, she faced 28th-ranked Polish archer Iwona Marcinkiewicz. Zhang won the match 166-157 in the regulation 18 arrows, advancing to the round of 16. She then lost to 21st-ranked and eventual bronze medalist Alison Williamson of Great Britain 165-161, finishing 10th in women's individual archery.

=== 2008 Summer Olympics ===
At the 2008 Summer Olympics in Beijing, Zhang finished her ranking round with a total of 635 points. This gave her the 27th seed for the final competition bracket in which she faced Tetyana Berezhna in the first round, beating the archer from Ukraine 109-97. In the second round Zhang defeated 6th seed Yuan Shu Chi 110-105, and advanced to the quarter-finals after a 110-98 victory against 11th seed Natalia Erdyniyeva. There she beat Joo Hyun-Jung 106-101. In the semi-final she upset another South Korean Yun Ok-Hee with 115-109. The 115 points matched the newly set Olympic Record by Park Sung-hyun earlier that day. Park turned out to be Zhang's opponent in the final and in a close match, the lead switching back and forth, Zhang eventually won the gold in a 110-109 match, becoming that first non-Korean to win the event since Keto Losaberidze at the 1980 Summer Olympics.

Together with Chen Ling and Guo Dan, she also took part in the team event. With her 635 score from the ranking round combined with the 645 of Chen and the 636 of Guo the Chinese team was in third position after the ranking round, which gave them a straight seed into the quarter-finals, where they defeated the Indian team 211-206. In the semi-final against Great Britain they scored 208 points against the British 202, securing their spot in the final. They faced South Korea, who won gold with a strong 224 points performance, and China, with 215 points, claimed silver.

=== Asian Games ===
She competed at the 2002 Asian Games, where she won a bronze medal in the team event, and at the 2006 Asian Games where she won a silver medal in the same event.

== 2015 "Mission Impossible" challenge ==
Zhang was invited to Nanjing as one of the seven best archers from around the world, to appear on a first-ever popular Chinese television program to feature an archery competition. The show, which aired on Jiangsu Broadcasting Corporation on 22 February 2015, was seen by 250 million Chinese viewers. Another finalist was Austrian archer, Peter O. Stecher. The challenge was to shoot arrows at falling rings. In the end, Zhang shot to a draw with Stecher, each hitting seven falling rings out of fifteen opportunities.
