= Naomi Folkard =

British archer (born 1983)

Naomi Folkard OLY
Personal information
- Full name: Naomi Anne Folkard
- Nationality: British
- Born: 18 September 1983 (age 42) Leamington Spa, Warwickshire, England, UK
- Education: University of Birmingham

Sport
- Country: Great Britain
- Sport: Archery
- Events: Recurve archery; Field archery
Medal record
Women's archery
Representing Great Britain
World Championships
Bronze medal – third place	2007 Leipzig	Team recurve
Bronze medal – third place	2017 Mexico City	Mixed team recurve
Bronze medal – third place	2019 's-Hertogenbosch	Team recurve
World Games
Gold medal – first place	2013 Cali	Ind. recurve (field)
Silver medal – second place	2017 Wrocław	Ind. recurve (field)
Bronze medal – third place	2009 Kaohsiung	Ind. recurve (field)
European Games
Gold medal – first place	2019 Minsk	Team recurve
Silver medal – second place	2019 Minsk	Mixed team recurve
Representing England
Commonwealth Games
Silver medal – second place	2010 Delhi	Team recurve
- Updated on 23 June 2019

Naomi Anne Folkard (born 18 September 1983) is a British archer who has represented Great Britain at the Olympic Games five times between 2004 and 2020. She has also represented Great Britain at the World Archery Championships and the Archery World Cup, and England at the Commonwealth Games.

Following a string of national titles in the early 2000s, Folkard won selection for the British Olympic archery team in 2004. She has since regularly competed in international recurve archery events and later participated in the 2008, 2012, and 2016 and 2020 Summer Olympics. She is also a prominent competitor in field archery, having won medals at the World Games and the World Field Archery Championships.

== Early and personal life ==
Naomi Folkard was born on 18 September 1983 in Leamington Spa, Warwickshire. She was introduced to archery at the age of five, first trying out the sport at a family scout camp. At twelve years old she was a member of the British junior team and progressed to the British senior team at the age of sixteen. Folkard's parents have both competed in archery competitions at the county level, and as of 2012 her brother was a member of the British junior team.

Folkard studied music at the University of Birmingham, competing in the 2004 Summer Olympics shortly after finishing her second year examinations. She began playing the violin and the piano at a young age, and credits her early experiences with the violin for her adeptness at archery, saying "it was obvious I had a greater co-ordination than most children of my age because of my music". In 2009 Folkard said had she not become an archer she would probably be a member of an orchestra.

Folkard has one daughter, who was born in 2021.

== Career ==
=== Early career ===
Folkard was British champion in 2000, 2001, and 2003, and competed in the World Student Games in 2003. She was a reserve for Britain's archery team for the 2000 Summer Olympics in Sydney. In 2004, she won the UK Indoor Archery Championships in the women's individual recurve category, shortly before qualifying for the Olympics in Athens later that year. Folkard emerged from the 2006 European Indoor Archery Championships a medallist, finishing second and coming away with a silver medal.

=== Olympic Games ===
2004 Summer Olympics

Folkard won selection for the 2004 Summer Olympics in April 2004, joining Helen Palmer and four-time Olympian Alison Williamson as a member of Great Britain's women's team. Folkard concluded the 72-arrow ranking round, which determined the seedings for the subsequent elimination rounds, in seventeenth position for the women's individual event and commented that although she had difficulty with her opening and closing arrows, "the middle bit was pretty good". She progressed as far as the third round where she was defeated by the top seed Park Sung-hyun of South Korea, losing to the eventual gold medalist by twelve points over the match's eighteen arrows. Folkard, Palmer, and Williamson fared poorly in the women's team event where they were defeated by India in the opening elimination round.

2008 Summer Olympics

At the 2008 Summer Olympics Folkard combined with teammates Williamson and Charlotte Burgess to take an unexpected second place for Great Britain in the ranking round for the women's team event, trailing only defending champions South Korea. The three progressed through the elimination rounds to reach the semi-finals, where a defeat to China sent them to contest the bronze medal match against France. After a thunderstorm postponed the match for 50 minutes, Folkard and her teammates shot below expectations and lost the twenty-four-arrow contest by two points. In a profile published in 2012, The Telegraph listed failing to win a medal in Beijing as her biggest sporting disappointment.

For the women's individual event Folkard had concluded the ranking round in eighth place with a score of 651 points from a maximum of 720. She advanced to the last sixteen of the competition but was defeated in the third round by Japan's Nami Hayakawa after a series of poor-scoring shots.

2012 Summer Olympics

Folkard secured her place as one of three British female archers for the 2012 Olympic Games in April 2012 at the national trials held in Lilleshall. She and teammates Williamson and Amy Oliver exited early from the women's team event after defeat to Russia in the opening round, having finished eleventh out of twelve nations in the ranking round. Folkard entered the elimination rounds of the women's individual event as the highest-placed Briton in forty-second place. Following a first-round victory over Russia's Kristina Timofeeva, which was praised by The Telegraph as a "fitting riposte" following the earlier British loss in the team event, Folkard bowed out to Mexico's Mariana Avitia in the second round.

2016 Summer Olympics

Folkard qualified for her fourth Olympic Games in June 2016, entering as one of two British archers contesting the 2016 Summer Olympics. She achieved a career-best Olympic performance by reaching the quarter-finals of the women's individual competition, matching the pre-Games target set for Great Britain's archers, where she lost to the eventual gold medalist Chang Hye-jin of South Korea. Following her defeat Folkard announced that Rio 2016 was to be her last Olympic games, saying "I've been a full-time archer for 11 years now and I need a life" and adding that she planned to become a coach.

2020 Summer Olympics

Despite planning to retire following the 2016 Summer Olympics, Folkard continued to participate in international tournaments. Her performances earned her a place on the British Olympic team for the delayed 2020 Summer Olympics in April 2021, her fifth consecutive appearance at the Games. She and her teammates Sarah Bettles and Bryony Pitman were eliminated by Italy in the women's team event, and Folkard was later knocked out by Wu Jiaxin in the women's individual event.

=== World Archery Championships ===
At the 2007 World Archery Championships Folkard won bronze medal with Alison Williamson and Charlotte Burgess in the women's team recurve event, defeating Italy in the third-place match after a loss to South Korea in the semi-finals. Folkard fared less well two years later at the 2009 Championships, advancing no further than the second round in both her team and individual competitions. She would however win two further bronze medals in the late 2010s, finishing third in the mixed team recurve with Patrick Huston at the 2017 Championships in Mexico City and later in the women's team recurve at the 2019 Championships in 's-Hertogenbosch.

Folkard won two medals each at the 2012 and 2014 World Field Archery Championships. At the 2012 Championships in Val-d'Isère in France she achieved a gold and a bronze in the women's team and individual competitions respectively before following up with two bronze medals in the same events in 2014.

=== Archery World Cup ===
Folkard achieved three medals at the Archery World Cup between 2007 and 2010. At the fourth stage of the 2007 World Cup in Dover she won gold in the women's recurve tournament with Alison Williamson and Charlotte Burgess, and in the 2008 edition combined with Williamson and Burgess to take gold in the Santo Domingo in April and bronze in Boé in June. With Edinburgh selected as the host for the final stage of the 2010 World Cup, Folkard was entered as a wildcard alongside other British athletes and won silver medal in the mixed team recurve competition with Simon Terry.

Folkard later took a bronze medal at the 2017 Indoor World Cup in Nîmes.

=== Other competitions ===
Folkard has contested the World Games three times, winning a medal in each of her appearances in the women's individual recurve event of the field archery competition. At the Games in 2009 in Taiwan Folkard achieved a bronze medal, and followed up four years later in Cali with gold medal, the first major title win of her career, after defeating Germany's Elena Richter in the final. Folkard reached the final again at the 2017 World Games in Wrocław, earning the silver medal after losing to Germany's Lisa Unruh.

Folkard won silver medal in the women's team recurve at the 2010 Commonwealth Games, together losing with Alison Williamson and Amy Oliver in the final by a single point to the hosts India.

At the 2019 European Games Folkard won two medals, achieving gold in the women's team event with Bryony Pitman and Sarah Bettles and silver in the mixed team competition with Patrick Huston.
