= Wei Pi-hsiu =

Taiwanese archer

Wei Pi-hsiu (born 4 July 1990 in Nantou County) is an athlete from Taiwan who competes in archery.

== 2008 Summer Olympics ==
At the 2008 Summer Olympics in Beijing Wei finished her ranking round with a total of 585 points. This gave her the 58th seed for the final competition bracket in which she faced Alison Williamson in the first round. The 7th seed archer from Great Britain was too strong with 108-99 and eliminated Wei. Together with Wu Hui-Ju and Yuan Shu-Chi she also took part in the team event. With her 585 score from the ranking round combined with the 634 of Wu and the 652 of Yuan the Chinese Taipei team was in eighth position after the ranking round. In the first round they faced the Italian team, but were unable to beat them. Italy advanced to the quarter finals with a 215–211 score.
