= Pranitha Vardhineni =

Indian archer

- Born: Parvathagiri, Warangal, Telangana, India
- Occupation: Sportsperson (Archer)

Pranitha Vardhineni is an Indian Recurve Archer.

== Early years ==
Pranitha Vardhineni was introduced to archery during her school years at the Rural Development Foundation's Kalleda Rural School in Warangal District, Telangana State, India. It was from here that she won a Bronze medal at the National Sub-Junior Archery Championships in 2004. This notable win led to her selection into the prestigious Tata Archery Academy in Jamshedpur, India.

== Employment ==
Pranitha Vardhineni was employed at the Indian railways, Bilaspur, Chhattisgarh.

Since 2013, she has been working as an Archery Coach with the Sports Authority of India. She is currently posted at the Sports Training Centre in Gachibowli, Hyderabad.

== National achievements ==
Between 2004 and 2013, Pranitha Vardhineni participated in twelve national level archery competitions and secured a medal in eleven of them.

Year	Name of Tournament	Venue	Medals
2013	34th Senior Nationals	Jamsedhpur	Gold-2 Silver-3 Bronze-1
2012	33rd Senior Nationals	Chennai	Silver-1
2007	33rd National Games	Guwahati	Silver-1
2012	32nd Senior Nationals	Jamsedhpur	Bronze-1
2011	31st Senior Nationals	Vijaywada	Participated
2010	30th Senior Nationals	Guwahati	Gold-1
2009	29th Senior Nationals	Pune	Gold-1 Silver-3
2008	28th Senior National	Jamsedhpur	Silver-2 Bronze-1
2007	27th Senior Nationals	Viyaywada	Silver-1 Bronze-1
2008	31st Junior Nationals	Jamsedhpur	Gold-2 Silver-2 Bronze-2
2007	30th Junior Nationals	Amravati	Gold-1 Bronze-1
2004	Sub- Junior Nationals	Delhi	Bronze-1

== International achievements ==
Between 2006 and 2015, Pranitha Vardhineni represented India in twenty one international archery competitions and secured a medal in twelve of them.

Year	Tournament	Venue	Medals
2015	4th World Cup	Medellin, Colombia	Participated
2014	27th Asian Games	Incheon, Korea	Participated
2014	4th World Cup	Poland	Participated
2014	1st World Cup	Shanghai, China	Participated
2010	Commonwealth Games Invitational Test Event	New Delhi, India	Bronze
2010	Asian Archery Grand Prix	Kuala Lumpur, Malaysia	Silver, Gold
2009	4th Asian Archery Grand Prix	Dhaka, Bangladesh	Gold
2009	4th Asian Archery Grand Prix	Kolkata, India	Participated
2009	2nd Asian Archery Grand Prix	Teheran, Iran	Gold
2009	1st Asian Archery Grand Prix	Bangkok, Thailand	Silver
2008	3rd Asian Archery Grand Prix	Manila, Philippines	Silver
2008	Youth World Championship	Antalya, Turkey	Silver
2008	29th Olympic Games	Beijing, China	Participated
2008	2nd Asian Archery Grand Prix	Teheran, Iran	Silver
2008	World Cup	Croatia, Porec	Participated
2008	World Cup	Santo Domingo, Dominican republic	Participated
2008	2nd South Asian Archery Championship	Jamsedhpur, India	Gold
2008	1st Asian Archery Grand Prix	Bangkok, Thailand	Bronze
2007	3rd Asian Archery Grand Prix	Isfahan, Iran	Participated
2007	2nd Archery Junior Championship	Chinese Taipei	Silver
2006	Cadet & Junior World Championship	Mérida, Mexico	Silver

== 2008 Summer Olympics, Beijing ==
Pranitha Vardhineni represented India in the women's individual and team archery events at the 2008 Summer Olympics in Beijing. In the individual event, she was ranked 31st in the qualifiers. She defeated Jane Waller of Australia by 106-100 in the round of 64, but lost to Kwon Un Sil of North Korea by 99-106 in the round of 32. She teamed up with Dola Banerjee and Bombayala Devi in the team event. They were ranked sixth in the qualifiers. They got a bye in the round of 16, but lost to China by 206-211 in the quarterfinals.
