= Nathalie Dielen =

Swiss archer (born 1966)

Nathalie Dielen (born 18 March 1966, 163 cm / 5'4", 73 kg / 161 lbs) is an athlete from Switzerland who competes in archery. She was formerly in a junior curling team.

At the 2008 Summer Olympics in Beijing Dielen finished her ranking round with a total of 601 points. This gave her the 54th seed for the final competition bracket in which she faced Natalia Erdyniyeva in the first round. The archer from Russia was too strong and eliminated Dielen with a 107-102 score straight away.

At the 2012 Summer Olympics in London, Dielen qualified at rank 62 out of 64 and was eliminated in the 1st round by the Chinese Taipei archer Tan Ya-Ting.

Her husband, Tom Dielen, is the secretary general of archery’s world governing body, which is known as World Archery.
