= Joo Hyun-jung =

South Korean archer (born 1982)

Medal record

Women's recurve archery

Representing South Korea

Olympics
Gold medal – first place	2008 Beijing	Team

World Championships
Gold medal – first place	2009 Ulsan	Individual
Gold medal – first place	2009 Ulsan	Team

Asian Games
Gold medal – first place	2010 Guangzhou	Team

Asian Championships
Gold medal – first place	2009 Denpasar	Individual
Gold medal – first place	2013 Taipei	Team
Silver medal – second place	2009 Denpasar	Team

- Joo Hyun-jung
- Hangul: 주현정
- Hanja: 朱賢貞
- RR: Ju Hyeonjeong
- MR: Chu Hyŏnjŏng

Joo Hyun-jung (Korean: 주현정; Hanja: 朱賢貞; Korean pronunciation: [tɕu.ɦjʌn.dʑʌŋ], born 3 May 1982) is a professional former world number one archer from South Korea.

== 2008 Summer Olympics ==
At the 2008 Summer Olympics in Beijing, Joo finished her ranking round with a total of 664 points, nine points behind ranking leader Park Sung-hyun. This gave her the third seed for the final competition bracket in which she faced Sigrid Romero in the first round, beating the archer from Colombia 108–98. In the second round, Joo was too strong for Natalia Valeeva (110–108) and via Bérengère Schuh (109–104) in the third round she advanced to the quarter-finals. There she faced 27th seed, but local Chinese favourite Zhang Juanjuan who won the confrontation with 106–101. Zhang went on to upset Joo's South Korean teammates Park and Yun Ok-hee in the semifinal and final to take the gold medal.

Together with Park Sung-hyun and Yun Ok-hee, she also took part in the team event. With her 664 score from the ranking round combined with the 673 of Park and the 667 of Yun the South Korean team was in first position after the ranking round, which gave them a straight seed into the quarter-finals. With 231-217 they were far too strong for the Italian team. The 231 also was a new World Record. In the semifinal against France, they scored 213 points with the French scoring 184, securing their final spot. Opponent China came with a strong 215 points performance, but South Korea won the gold with a 224 points score.
