= Olympic Green Archery Field =

Temporary sports venue in Beijing, China

Coordinates: 40°1′3″N 116°22′15″E

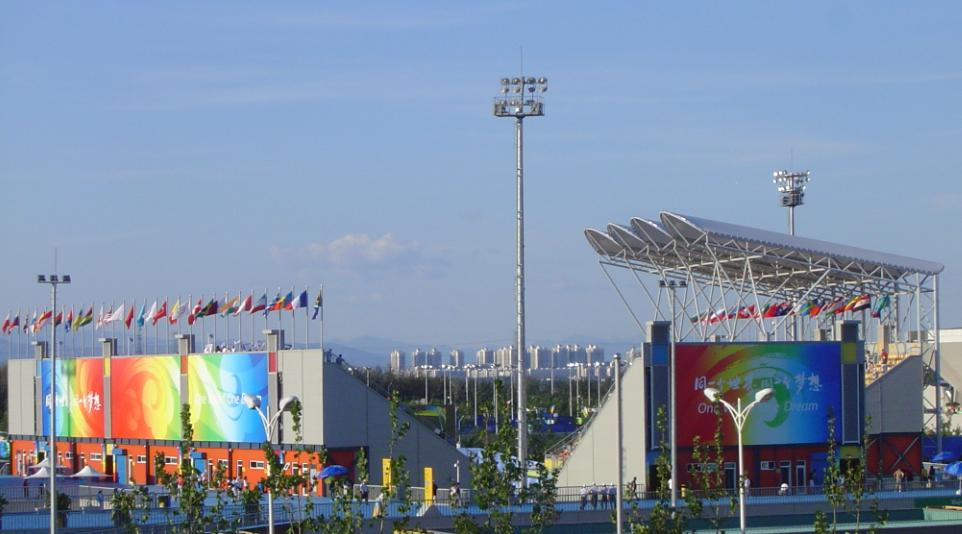
Olympic Green Archery Field

The Olympic Green Archery Field (simplified Chinese: 北京奥林匹克公园射箭场; traditional Chinese: 北京奧林匹克公園射箭場; pinyin: Běijīng Àolínpǐkè Gōngyuán Shèjiànchǎng) was one of nine temporary venues for the 2008 Summer Olympics. It hosted the archery events.

The field occupied 9.22 hectares and had a seating capacity of 5,000. After the games it was dismantled.
