= Jane Waller =

Australian archer (born 1990)

Jane Waller (born 19 June 1990 in Gold Coast, Queensland) is an athlete from Australia who competes in archery. She was an Australian Institute of Sport scholarship holder.

At the 2008 Summer Olympics in Beijing Waller finished her ranking round with a total of 634 points. This gave her the 28th seed for the final competition bracket in which she faced Pranitha Vardhineni in the first round. Despite the archer from India only being the 37th seed, she won the confrontation with 106-100 and eliminated Waller.
