= Charlotte Burgess =

British archer (born 1987)

Personal information
- Nationality: British
- Born: 25 January 1987 (age 39) Salford, Greater Manchester, England, UK
- Height: 173 cm (5 ft 8 in)
- Weight: 79 kg (174 lb)

Sport
- Country: United Kingdom
- Sport: Archery
- Event: Recurve archery
- Club: Bowmen of Bruntwood
Medal record
Women's Archery
Representing Great Britain
World Archery Championships
Bronze medal – third place	2007 Leipzig	Team
- Updated on 5 September 2016

Charlotte Burgess (born 25 January 1987 in Salford) is a British archer who represented Great Britain at the 2008 Summer Olympics.

== Early and personal life ==
Burgess was born in Salford. She was introduced to archery at eleven years old during a family holiday to the Isle of Wight.

In January 2008 Burgess and her boyfriend were treated for injuries sustained in an attack by a group of teenagers outside an indoor archery range in Cheadle, near Stockport, Greater Manchester, the pair both suffering bruising to the face. Despite the assault Burgess managed to qualify for the European Indoor Championships in Turin just two days later.

== Career ==
=== Early career (1998–2008) ===
Burgess made her debut in competitive archery in 1998, and by 2002 was the second-highest ranked youth archer in Europe. Her success in junior competitions, a strong performance at the 2004 European Outdoor Archery Championships, and her narrow loss to the then three-time Olympian Alison Williamson in the national qualifiers for the 2004 Summer Olympics led Burgess to be recognised as an upcoming star of British archery.

In 2007 Burgess won a bronze medal for Great Britain alongside Williamson and Naomi Folkard in the women's team event at the 2007 World Archery Championships, defeating the Italian team in the bronze medal match to finish third overall. Later that year the three were medallists at the fourth stage of the 2007 Archery World Cup held in Dover, winning the women's team recurve tournament. At the 2008 Archery World Cup Burgess, again with Williamson and Folkard, won gold medal in the team competition in Santo Domingo, Dominican Republic, in April, and a bronze medal in the same event in Boé, France, two months later.

=== 2008 Summer Olympics ===
Burgess qualified to represent Great Britain at the 2008 Olympics, competing in both the women's individual and women's team events. Burgess concluded the preliminary ranking round, in which archers were seeded for the subsequent elimination stages based on their total score from 72 arrows, 40th of the 64 competitors. Her tally, combined with that of her teammates Williamson and Folkard, additionally placed Great Britain second for the team elimination rounds, behind only reigning champions South Korea.

In the women's team event, which was contested prior to the individual competition, Burgess, Williamson and Folkard secured victory over Japan in the quarter-finals before defeated by China in the semi-finals. They thereby advanced to the bronze medal match against France, who had lost their semi-final match against South Korea. In wet conditions the trio were outscored by the French by a single point over the 216-arrow contest, finishing the event in fourth place. Burgess was less successful in the individual competition, defeating China's Guo Dan in the first round before being eliminated by teammate Folkard in the second round.

=== Post-Olympics ===
Burgess narrowly missed out on qualifying for the 2012 Summer Olympics held in London; she did however claim a gold medal alongside Michael Peart at the European Grand Prix in Cyprus in the mixed team recurve competition.

In 2015 it was announced that Burgess had joined Team GB's paralympic team as performance coach for the recurve archery athletes.

In 2017, Burgess also became the Lead Coach in the training and development of archers for the UK Invictus Games Team. Later the same year, she attended the 2017 Invictus Games within the role of Head Coach for Archery. Burgess continued in the Lead Coach role in 2018.
