= Barbora Horáčková =

Czech archer (1969–2018)

Barbora Horáčková (15 January 1969, in Ostrava – 8 April 2018) was an athlete from the Czech Republic who competed in archery.

At the 2008 Summer Olympics in Beijing Horáčková finished her ranking round with a total of 620 points. This gave her the 44th seed for the final competition bracket in which she faced Viktoriya Koval in the first round. The archer from Ukraine eliminated her straight away with a 109-107 score.

Her daughter Marie Horáčková is another Czech Olympic archer.
