= Anastassiya Bannova =

Kazakhstani archer (born 1989)

Personal information
- Born: 26 February 1989 (age 37) Ural'sk, Kazakh SSR, Soviet Union
- Height: 1.68 m (5 ft 6 in)
- Weight: 56 kg (123 lb)

Sport
- Country: Kazakhstan
- Sport: Archery
- Event: Recurve
- Coached by: Valery Plotnikov, Elena Plotnikova
Medal record
Women's recurve archery
Representing Kazakhstan
Asian Championships
Gold medal – first place	2011 Tehran	Mixed team

Anastassiya Bannova (born 26 February 1989) is an archer from Kazakhstan. Bannova represented Kazakhstan at the 2008 Summer Olympics. She placed 35th in the women's individual ranking round with a 72-arrow score of 628. In the first round of elimination, she faced 30th-ranked Natalia Valeeva of Italy. Bannova was defeated by Valeeva, losing 105–107 in the 18-arrow match, failing to advance to the round of 32. In 2012, she was nominated to participate in the women's individual competition at the 2012 Summer Olympics in London. At the London Olympics, she was ranked 54th after the qualifying round, before losing in the first elimination round to Aida Roman.
