= Anja Hitzler =

German archer

Anja Hitzler (born 16 February 1983 in Welzheim) is an athlete from Germany. She is a professional soldier and competes in archery.

Hitzler represented Germany at the 2004 Summer Olympics. She placed 23rd in the women's individual ranking round with a 72-arrow score of 632. In the first round of elimination, she faced 42nd-ranked Damla Gunay of Turkey. Hitzler defeated Damla, winning 163–152 in the 18-arrow match to advance to the round of 32. In that round, she faced Wu Hui Ju of Chinese Taipei, losing to the 10th-ranked archer in a 9–8 tie-breaker after matching Wu 156–156 in the regulation 18 arrows. Hitzler finished 21st in women's individual archery. Hitzler was also a member of the 7th-place German team in the women's team archery competition.

During the 2008 Summer Olympics in Beijing, she was ranked 33rd in the women's individual archery preliminaries with a score of 629. In the first round she defeated Sophie Dodemont with 107–106. She went on to lose to top ranked Park Sung-hyun in the 1/16 elimination round, losing the match with 112–107.
