= Najmeh Abtin =

Iranian archer (born 1982)

Medal record

Women's archery

Representing Iran

Asian Indoor Games
Bronze medal – third place	2009 Hai Phong	Team

Najmeh Abtin (Persian: نجمه آبتین, born August 12, 1982, in Shiraz) is an Iranian archer.

At the 2008 Summer Olympics in Beijing Abtin finished her ranking round with a total of 568 points. This gave her the 60th seed for the final competition bracket in which she faced Kwon Un-Sil in the first round. The archer from North Korea was too strong and won the confrontation with 106–96, eliminating Abtin straight away.
