= Albina Kamaletdinova =

Tajikistani archer

Albina Kamaletdinova (born January 24, 1969) is an athlete from Tajikistan who competes in archery.

== 2008 Summer Olympics ==
At the 2008 Summer Olympics in Beijing Kamaletdinova finished her ranking round with a total of 547 points. This gave her the 63rd seed for the final competition bracket in which she faced Yun Ok-Hee in the first round. The archer from South Korea was too strong and won the confrontation with 109-102, eliminating Kamaletdinova straight away. Yun would eventually go on to win the bronze medal.
