= Yuki Hayashi (archer) =

Japanese archer (born 1984)

Medal record

Women's recurve archery

Representing Japan

Asian Championships
Bronze medal – third place	2013 Taipei	Team

Yuki Hayashi (林 勇気, Hayashi Yūki; born October 2, 1984 in Hyōgo) is an athlete from Japan who competes in archery.

== 2008 Summer Olympics ==
At the 2008 Summer Olympics in Beijing Hayashi finished her ranking round with a total of 616 points. This gave her the 48th seed for the final competition bracket in which she faced Kristina Esebua in the first round. The archer from Georgia and Hayashi both scored 102 points in the regular match. In the decisive extra round Esebua scored 9 points, while Hayashi came to 8 points and was eliminated. Together with Sayoko Kitabatake and Nami Hayakawa she also took part in the team event. With her 616 score from the ranking round combined with the 616 of Kitabatake and the 649 of Hayakawa the Japanese team was in seventh position after the ranking round. In the first round they eliminated the Colombian team with 206–199. However second seed Great Britain was too strong in the quarter-final, beating Japan with 201–196. Yuki Hayashi is employed in the legal department of HORIBA CO., the Kyoto-based electronics and metrology industrial firm. In 2018, she was a member of the Japan National Archery Team.
