= Lexie Feeney =

Australian archer (born 1989)

Medal record

Women's recurve archery

World Field Championships
Silver medal – second place	2024 Lac La Biche	Mixed team

Alexandra Feeney (born 3 July 1989 in Penrith) is an athlete from Australia who competes in archery. She was an Australian Institute of Sport scholarship holder.

At the 2005 Italian Grand Prix, Lexi Feeny won her opening round match before defeating Frigeri (ITA) in the following round. In the final, Feeny competed against Mospinek (POL) for the gold medal. Feeny finished the tournament with a silver medal, marking the first international medal won by a female athlete in the Australian Institute of Sport Archery Program.

At the 2008 Summer Olympics in Beijing Feeney finished her ranking round with a total of 580 points. This gave her the 59th seed for the final competition bracket in which she faced Yuan Shu-Chi in the first round. The archer from Chinese Taipei was too strong and won the confrontation with 104–101, eliminating Feeney straight away.

At the 2010 Commonwealth Games in Delhi Feeney finished her ranking round with a total of 625 points. Feeney progressed to the quarter finals in which she faced Deepika Kumari the top ranked archer from India. Feeney's final ranking for the Games was 8th.
