= Natalia Erdyniyeva =

Russian archer (born 1988)

Personal information
- Born: 6 August 1988 (age 37) Ulan-Ude, Buryatia, Russia
Medal record
Women's archery
Representing Russia
World Championships
Bronze medal – third place	2007 Leipzig	Individual

Natalia Erdyniyeva (Russian: Ната́лья Константи́новна Эрдыни́ева, Natálya Konstantínovna Erdyníyeva, born 6 August 1988 in Ulan-Ude, Buryatia) is a Russian archer of the Buryat-Mongol ethnicity. Natalia is a student at Buryat State University in Ulan-Ude. She was trained by her parents, starting with her mother Gerelma Erdyniyeva. Her hobby is dancing.

== Early career achievements ==
- 30 April 2007 — Silver at the second stage of Archery World Cup 2007, Varese.
- 28 May 2007 — Gold result at the third stage of Archery World Cup 2007, Antalya
- 7 July 2007 — Bronze at the 44th Outdoor Archery World championship, Leipzig.
- 24 July 2007 - Achieved world number one ranking
- 24 November 2007 — Bronze at the Archery World Cup 2007, Dubai.
- 1 April 2008 — Silver at the first stage of Archery World Cup 2008, Santo Domingo

== 2008 Summer Olympics ==
At the 2008 Summer Olympics in Beijing Erdyniyeva finished her ranking round with a total of 647 points. This gave her the 11th seed for the final competition bracket in which she faced Nathalie Dielen in the first round, beating the archer from Switzerland with 107-102. In the second round she was too strong for Iwona Marcinkiewicz with 104-103. She was upset in the third round of competition when she lost against 27th seed Zhang Juanjuan with 110-98. Zhang eventually went on to win the gold medal.
