= Sayoko Kitabatake =

Japanese archer (born 1978)

Medal record

Women's recurve archery

Representing Japan

Asian Championships
Silver medal – second place	2007 Xi'an	Team

Sayoko Kitabatake (北畠 紗代子, Kitabatake Sayoko; born October 24, 1978 in Higashiōsaka, Osaka) is an athlete from Japan who competes in archery. She competed under her birth name Sayoko Kawauchi (川内 紗代子) at the 2004 Olympics.

Kawauchi represented Japan at the 2004 Summer Olympics. She placed 53rd in the women's individual ranking round with a 72-arrow score of 601. In the first round of elimination, she faced 12th-ranked Nataliya Burdeyna of Ukraine. Kawauchi defeated Burdeyna, winning 137-129 in the 18-arrow match to advance to the round of 32. In that round, she faced Alison Williamson of Great Britain, losing to the 21st-ranked and eventual bronze medalist archer 154-150 in the regulation 18 arrows. Kawauchi finished 26th in women's individual archery.

Kawauchi was also a member of the 14th-place Japanese women's archery team.

== 2008 Summer Olympics ==
At the 2008 Summer Olympics in Beijing Kitabatake finished her ranking round with a total of 616 points. This gave her the 46th seed for the final competition bracket in which she faced Justyna Mospinek in the first round, beating the archer from Poland and 19th seed with 103-101. In the second round she was not able to win against French 14th seed Bérengère Schuh (112-100). Together with Nami Hayakawa and Yuki Hayashi she also took part in the team event. With her 616 score from the ranking round combined with the 616 of Hayashi and the 649 of Hayakawa the Japanese team was in seventh position after the ranking round. In the first round they eliminated the Colombian team with 206-199. However second seed Great Britain was too strong in the quarter-final, beating Japan with 201-196.
