= Kwon Un-sil =

North Korean archer (born 1983)

Medal record

Women's archery

Representing North Korea

Asian Games
Bronze medal – third place	2010 Guangzhou	Individual

- Kwon Un-sil
- Hangul: 권은실
- RR: Gwon Eunsil
- MR: Kwŏn Ŭnsil

Kwon Un-sil (Korean: 권은실; born September 17, 1983) is an athlete from North Korea who competes in archery. Kwon was born in Hamhung, South Hamgyong Province.

== 2008 Summer Olympics ==
At the 2008 Summer Olympics in Beijing Kwon finished her ranking round with a total of 656 points. This gave her the 5th seed for the final competition bracket in which she faced Najmeh Abtin in the first round, beating the archer from Iran with 106–96. In the second round she was too strong for Pranitha Vardhineni with 106-99 and via Aida Román (105-100) she achieved her place in the quarter-final. There she eliminated another Mexican, Mariana Avitia with 105-99 to go on to the semi-final. In the semi-final Kwon was unable to beat first seed Park Sung-hyun who won the match 109–106. Kwon could still win the bronze medal against another South Korean Yun Ok-hee, but eventually lost again with 109-106 to finish just outside the medals.

== 2012 Summer Olympics ==
Kwon qualified for the 2012 Summer Olympics, but lost in the first round to Natalia Valeeva.
