= Jennifer Nichols =

American archer (born 1983)

Personal information
- Full name: Jennifer L. Nichols Hardy
- Born: October 4, 1983 (age 42) Kansas City, Missouri, U.S.
- Education: Texas A&M University
- Height: 6 ft 0 in (183 cm)
- Weight: 138 lb (63 kg)
- Spouse: Chris Hardy (m. 2012)

Sport
- Country: United States
- Sport: Women's archery
Medal record
Representing the United States
World Cup Final
Gold medal – first place	2012 Tokyo	Mixed Team
Pan American Games
Gold medal – first place	2003 Santo Domingo	Team
Gold medal – first place	2007 Rio de Janeiro	Individual
Bronze medal – third place	2007 Rio de Janeiro	Team

Jennifer L. Nichols Hardy (born October 4, 1983) is an archer from the United States. She was born in Kansas City, Missouri. Nichols started archery when she was twelve years old and at fifteen she won the National Youth Archery Competition.

== 2004 Summer Olympics ==
Nichols represented the United States at the 2004 Summer Olympics. She placed 19th in the women's individual ranking round with a 72-arrow score of 638. In the first round of elimination, she faced 46th-ranked Puspitasari Rina Dewi of Indonesia. Nichols defeated Puspitasari 160-141 in the 18-arrow match to advance to the round of 32. In that round, she faced 14th-ranked Ukrainian archer Tetyana Berezhna. Nichols won the match 163-160 in the regulation 18 arrows, advancing to the round of 16. She then lost to 3rd-ranked Yun Mi Jin of Korea 168-162, finishing 9th in women's individual archery. She has been featured in Vogue Magazine.

== 2008 Summer Olympics ==
At the 2008 Summer Olympics in Beijing Nichols finished her ranking round with a total of 637 points. This gave her the 24th seed for the final competition bracket in which she faced Ika Yuliana Rochmawati in the first round, beating the archer from Indonesia with 114-101. In the second round she came close, but was unable to upset 9th seed Nami Hayakawa and lost the match with 105-103.

== 2012 Summer Olympics ==
At the 2012 Summer Olympics in London Nichols lost out to Bishindi Urantagula of Mongolia in the round of sixteen.

== Personal life ==
Nichols married Chris Hardy in September 2012.
