= Nami Hayakawa =

Japanese archer (born 1984)

Medal record

Women's recurve archery

Representing Japan

Asian Championships
Gold medal – first place	2011 Tehran	Team
Silver medal – second place	2007 Xi'an	Team

Nami Hayakawa (早川 浪, Hayakawa Nami; born October 6, 1984 in Jeonju, South Korea) is an athlete from Japan who competes in archery. She was the 2007 World Indoor Women's Recurve Champion in the competition held in Izmir, Turkey that year.

== Personal life ==
Nami has a younger sister, Ren who is also an Olympic archer and competed in 2012 Summer Olympics.

== 2008 Summer Olympics ==
At the 2008 Summer Olympics in Beijing Hayakawa finished her ranking round with a total of 649 points. This gave her the 9th seed for the final competition bracket in which she faced Elena Mousikou in the first round, beating the archer from Cyprus with 112-103. In the second round she was too strong for Jennifer Nichols with 105-103 and via Naomi Folkard with 106-97 she reached the quarter-finals. There she was eliminated with 112-103 by Park Sung-hyun who would eventually win the silver medal. Together with Sayoko Kitabatake and Yuki Hayashi she also took part in the team event. With her 649 score from the ranking round combined with the 616's of Kitabatake and Hayashi the Japanese team was in seventh position after the ranking round. In the first round they eliminated the Colombian team with 206-199. However second seed Great Britain was too strong in the quarter-final, beating Japan with 201-196.
