= Elena Tonetta =

Italian archer (born 1988)

Medal record

Women's archery

Representing Italy

World Championships
Silver medal – second place	1 Team medal	Outdoor

European Championships
Gold medal – first place	1 Individual medal	Outdoor
Bronze medal – third place	1 Individual medal	Indoor

Elena Tonetta (born 8 June 1988 in Rovereto) is an Italian archer.

In 2005, she was the Junior European Champion, winning at Silkeborg (Denmark). She won the second place in the final of the Junior World Cup, at Mérida (Mexico) in 2006. A year later she won the Italian National Championship in Castenaso and in 2008 she got the bronze medal in the individual game at the European XI European and Mediterranean Indoor Archery Championships.

== 2008 Summer Olympics ==
At the 2008 Summer Olympics in Beijing Tonetta finished her ranking round with a total of 595 points. This gave her the 55th seed for the final competition bracket in which she faced 10th seed Ana Rendón in the first round. The archer from Colombia was too strong, but only after an extra round as both archers scored a 106 score in the regular match. In the extra round Rendón scored 10 points and Tonetta 9. Together with Natalia Valeeva and Pia Carmen Lionetti she also took part in the team event. With her 595 score from the ranking round combined with the 634 of Valeeva and the 613 of Lionetti the Italian team was in 9th position after the ranking round. In the first round they were too strong for the team from Chinese Taipei, beating them 215–211. However, in the quarter-final they were eliminated by the eventual gold medalists from South Korea, despite a 217-point score. The Koreans managed to shoot a new world record of 231 points to advance to the semi-final.
