= Chen Ling =

Chinese archer (born 1987)

Personal information
- Nationality: Chinese
- Born: June 16, 1987 (age 39) Zhenjiang, Jiangsu
- Education: Sport Studies - Nanjing Sports Institute: Nanjing, China
- Occupation: Athlete
- Height: 1.70 m (5 ft 7 in)
- Weight: 58 kg (128 lb)
Medal record
Women's recurve archery
Representing China
Olympic Games
Silver medal – second place	2008 Beijing	Team
Asian Championships
Bronze medal – third place	2007 Xi'an	Individual

Chen Ling (simplified Chinese: 陈玲; traditional Chinese: 陳玲; pinyin: Chén Líng; born June 16, 1987 in Zhenjiang, Jiangsu) is a female archer from the People's Republic of China.

== 2008 Summer Olympics ==
At the 2008 Summer Olympics in Beijing, Chen finished her ranking round with a total of 645 points. This gave her the 15th seed for the final competition bracket in which she faced Evangelia Psarra in the first round, beating the archer from Greece with 110-101. In the second round she had a tough competition beating Katsiarina Muliuk with only one point difference (106-105). She was unable to qualify for the quarter-finals due to a loss against South Korean Yun Ok-Hee who won the third round match with 113-103.

Together with Guo Dan and Zhang Juanjuan, Chen also took part in the team event. With her 645 score from the ranking round combined with the 636 of Guo and the 635 of Zhang the Chinese team was in third position after the ranking round, which gave them a straight seed into the quarter-finals. With 211-206 they were too strong for the Indian team. In the semi-final against Great Britain they scored 208 points with the British scoring 202, securing their final spot. Opponent South Korea came with a strong 224 points performance, resulting in the silver medal for China, as 215 points was not enough to claim the gold.
