= Sophie Dodemont =

French archer (born 1973)

Medal record

Representing France

Women's archery

Olympic Games
Bronze medal – third place	2008 Beijing	Team

World Championships
Bronze medal – third place	2013 Belek	Team

European Games
Bronze medal – third place	2019 Minsk	Individual

European Championships
Gold medal – first place	2021 Antalya	Team
Silver medal – second place	2022 Munich	Individual

Indoor World Cup
Bronze medal – third place	2025 Luxembourg	Individual

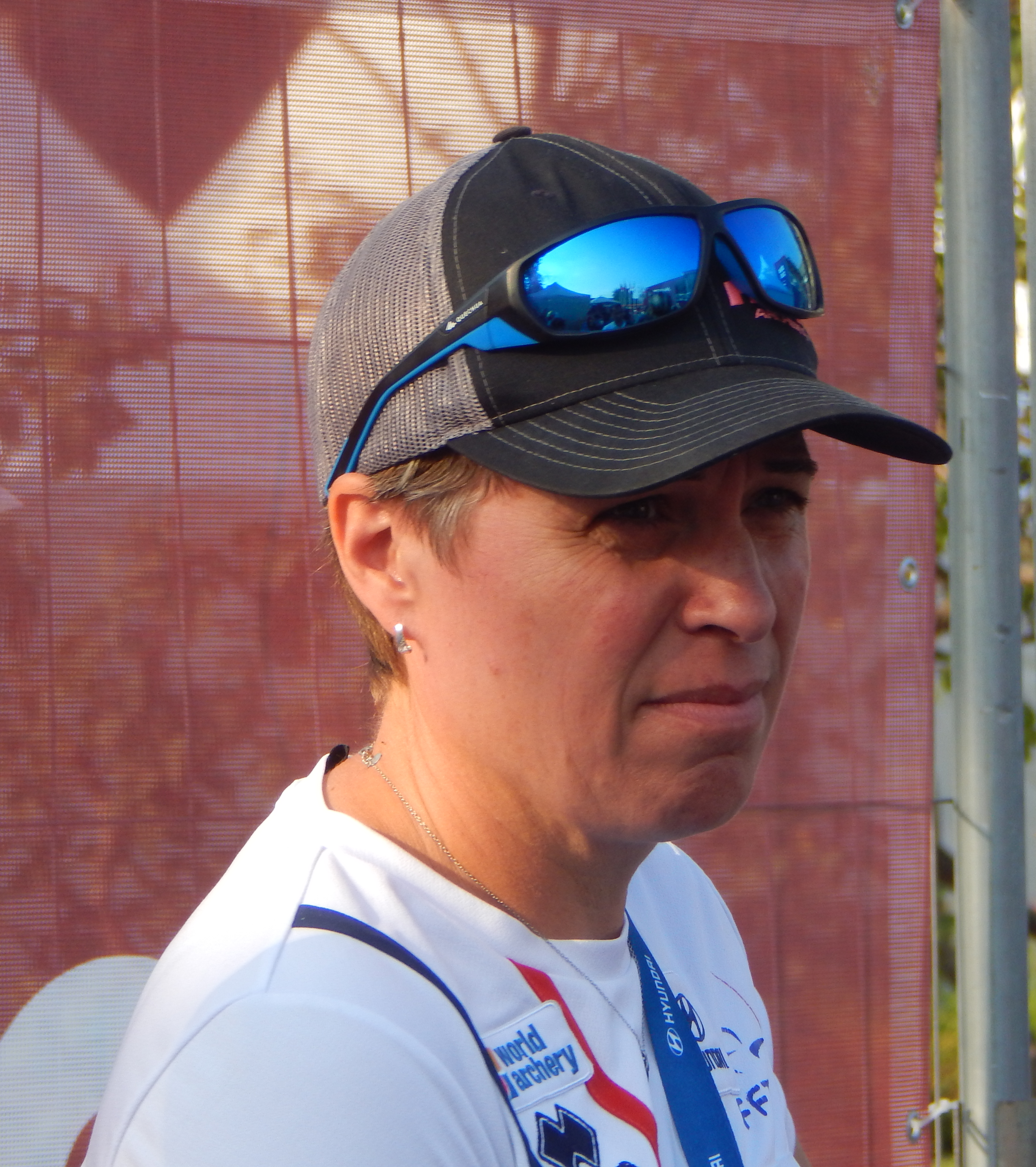
2019 Archery World Cup Final in Moscow. Women's compound

Sophie Dodemont (born 30 August 1973 in Pont-Sainte-Maxence) is an archer from France.

At the 2008 Summer Olympics in Beijing Dodemont finished her ranking round with a total of 632 points. This gave her the 32nd seed for the final competition bracket in which she faced Anja Hitzler in the first round. Hitzler won the confrontation between the 32nd and 33rd seed with 107-106 and Dodemont was eliminated.

Together with Bérengère Schuh and Virginie Arnold she also took part in the team event. With her 632 score from the ranking round combined with the 645 of Schuh and the 626 of Arnold the French team was in fifth position after the ranking round, which gave them a straight seed into the quarter-finals. With 218-211 they were too strong for the Polish team. In the semi-final against South Korea they scored only 184 points with the Koreans scoring 213, missing out on the final. They recovered in the bronze medal match and won against Great Britain 203-201 to claim the bronze.

Dodemont later converted to the compound discipline, achieving success including a team bronze medal at the 2013 World Archery Championships and a team gold medal at the 2021 European Archery Championships in Antalya, Turkey.

She won the silver medal in the women's individual compound event at the 2022 European Archery Championships held in Munich, Germany.
