= Yuan Shu-chi =

Taiwanese archer (born 1984)

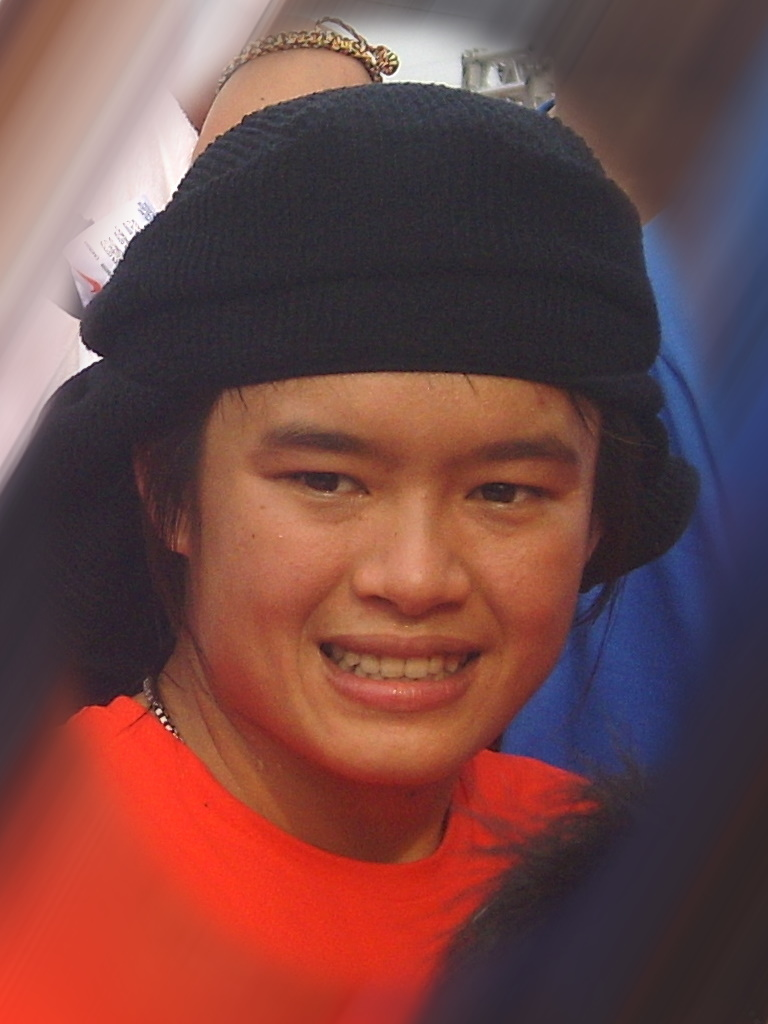
- Yuan Shu-chi, 2008 Nike+ Human Race in Taipei, Taiwan

Personal information
- Born: 9 November 1984 (age 41) Nantou County
- Height: 168 cm (5 ft 6 in)
- Weight: 62 kg (137 lb)
Medal record
Women's Archery
Representing Chinese Taipei
Olympic Games
Bronze medal – third place	2004 Athens	Team
Asian Games
Gold medal – first place	2002 Busan	Individual
Silver medal – second place	2002 Busan	Team
Bronze medal – third place	2006 Doha	Team
Universiade
Silver medal – second place	2011 Shenzhen	Recurve mixed team
Bronze medal – third place	2011 Shenzhen	Recurve team

Yuan Shu-chi (Chinese: 袁叔琪; pinyin: Yuán Shúqí; Wade–Giles: Yüan Shu-ch'i; born 9 November 1984 in Nantou County) is an athlete from Chinese Taipei. She competes in archery.

== 2004 Summer Olympics ==
Yuan represented the Republic of China (as Chinese Taipei) at the 2004 Summer Olympics. She was placed 6th in the women's individual ranking round, with a 72-arrow score of 658. In the first elimination round, she faced 59th-ranked Kateryna Palekha of Ukraine. Yuan defeated Palekha 162–158 in the 18-arrow match to advance to the round of 32. In that round, she faced 27th-ranked Polish archer Małgorzata Sobieraj, defeating her 158–149. Yuan then defeated 43rd-ranked Reena Kumari of India 166–148, advancing to the quarterfinals. In the quarterfinals, Yuan faced Yun Mi-jin of South Korea, defeating the 3rd-ranked archer 107–105 in the 12-arrow match to end the Korean team's hopes of sweeping the medals. Yuan advanced to the semifinals, where she was defeated by Korean Lee Sung-jin 104–98, moving Yuan to the bronze medal match. In the final 12-arrow match, she lost by one point to 21st-ranked Alison Williamson of Great Britain, finishing just out of the medals at 4th place in women's individual archery. Yuan was also a member of the team that won the bronze medal for Chinese Taipei in the women's team archery competition.

== 2008 Summer Olympics ==
At the 2008 Summer Olympics in Beijing, Yuan finished her ranking round with a total of 652 points. This gave her the sixth seed for the final competition bracket, in which she faced Lexie Feeney in the first round, beating the archer from Australia 104–101. In the second round, Yuan was surprised by 27th seed and local Chinese favourite Zhang Juanjuan with the Chinese winning the match 110–105. Zhang would eventually go on to win gold in the tournament. Together with Wu Hui-ju and Wei Pi-hsiu she also took part in the team event. With her 652 score from the ranking round combined with the 634 of Wu and the 585 of Wei the Chinese Taipei team was in eighth position after the ranking round. In the first round they faced the Italian team, but were unable to beat them. Italy advanced to the quarter-finals with a 215–211 score.

== Asian Games ==
She also competed in the 2002 Asian Games, where she won a gold medal in the individual event and a silver medal in the team event, and in the 2006 Asian Games where she won a bronze medal in the team event.
