= Virginie Arnold =

French archer (born 1979)

Medal record

Representing France

Women's archery

Olympic Games
Bronze medal – third place	2008 Beijing	Team

Virginie Arnold (born 24 December 1979) is an archer from France. She was a bronze medalist in the women's team event at the 2008 Summer Olympics.

At the 2008 Summer Olympics in Beijing Arnold finished her ranking round with a total of 626 points. This gave her the 39th seed for the final competition bracket in which she faced Khatuna Lorig in the first round. Lorig won the confrontation between the 39th and 26th seed with 107-105 and Arnold was eliminated.

Together with Bérengère Schuh and Sophie Dodemont she also took part in the team event. With her 626 score from the ranking round combined with the 645 of Schuh and the 632 of Dodemont the French team was in fifth position after the ranking round, which gave them a straight seed into the quarter-finals. With 218-211 they were too strong for the Polish team. In the semi-final against South Korea they scored only 184 points with the Koreans scoring 213, missing out on the final. They recovered in the bronze medal match and won against Great Britain 203–201 to claim the bronze.
