= Wu Hui-ju =

Taiwanese archer (born 1982)

Personal information
- Born: 12 November 1982 (age 43) Tainan
- Height: 165 cm (5 ft 5 in)
- Weight: 56 kg (123 lb)
Medal record
Women's Archery
Representing Chinese Taipei
Olympic Games
Bronze medal – third place	2004 Athens	Team
Asian Games
Bronze medal – third place	2006 Doha	Team

Wu Hui-ju (Chinese: 吳蕙如; pinyin: Wú Huìrú; Wade–Giles: Wu Hui-ju; born 12 November 1982 in Tainan) is an athlete from Republic of China. She competes in archery.

== 2004 Summer Olympics ==
Wu represented the Republic of China (as Chinese Taipei) at the 2004 Summer Olympics. She placed 10th in the women's individual ranking round with a 72-arrow score of 649. In the first round of elimination, she faced 55th-ranked Narguis Nabieva of Tajikistan. Wu defeated Nabieva 156–142 in the 18-arrow match to advance to the round of 32. In that round, she faced 23rd-ranked German archer Anja Hitzler, defeating her 9–8 in a tie-breaker after the first 18 arrows resulted in a tie at 156. Wu then defeated 7th-ranked Justyna Mospinek of Poland 160–151, advancing to the quarterfinals. In the quarterfinals, Wu faced Lee Sung Jin of Korea, losing to the 2nd-ranked and eventual silver medalist archer. The final score of 104–103 in the 12 arrow match placed Wu 6th overall in women's individual archery. Wu was also a member of the team that won the bronze medal for Chinese Taipei in the women's team archery competition.

== 2008 Summer Olympics ==
At the 2008 Summer Olympics in Beijing Wu finished her ranking round with a total of 634 points. This gave her the 29th seed for the final competition bracket in which she faced Leydis Brito in the first round. The 36th seeded archer from Venezuela was too strong with 104-98 and advanced to the next round. Together with Yuan Shu-Chi and Wei Pi-Hsiu she also took part in the team event. With her 634 score from the ranking round combined with the 652 of Yuan and the 585 of Wei the Chinese Taipei team was in eighth position after the ranking round. In the first round they faced the Italian team, but were unable to beat them. Italy advanced to the quarter-finals with a 215–211 score.
