= Alison Williamson =

British archer (born 1971)

Alison Williamson MBE
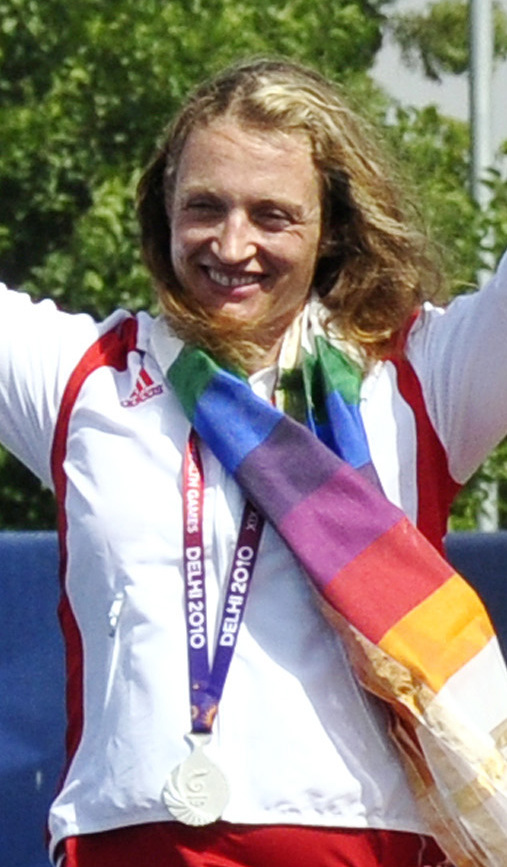
- XIX Commonwealth Games – 2010 Delhi Archery (women's individual recurve) Alison Jane Williamson of England (silver) during the medal presentation ceremony

Personal information
- Full name: Alison Jane Williamson
- Born: 3 November 1971 (age 54) Melton Mowbray, Leicestershire, England
- Education: Arizona State University

Sport
- Country: Great Britain
- Sport: Archery
- Event: Recurve
- Club: Long Mynd Archers
Medal record
Representing Great Britain
Olympic Games
Bronze medal – third place	2004 Athens	Individual
World Championships
Silver medal – second place	1999 Riom	Individual recurve
Bronze medal – third place	2007 Leipzig	Team recurve
Representing England
Commonwealth Games
Silver medal – second place	2010 Delhi	Individual recurve
Silver medal – second place	2010 Delhi	Team recurve

Alison Jane Williamson MBE (born 3 November 1971) is a retired British archer who represented Great Britain at six consecutive Olympic Games from 1992 to 2012. She won a bronze medal in the women's individual event at the 2004 Summer Olympics, becoming the first British woman to win an Olympic archery medal in ninety-six years. Williamson achieved two medals at the World Archery Championships and represented England at the 2010 Commonwealth Games, winning two silver medals.

Williamson was appointed Member of the Order of the British Empire (MBE) in 2012. She announced her retirement from archery in 2014.

== Early and personal life ==
Alison Williamson was born on 3 November 1971 in Melton Mowbray, Leicestershire. She was introduced to archery at the age of seven by her parents, who both practised the sport recreationally. As of 2012, both her parents remained active in the sport, her father holding the position of president of the British archery's governing body, Archery GB, and her mother working as a coach. At the age of ten Williamson won a silver medal at the 1981 Wenlock Olympian Games and at fourteen she qualified for her first international tournament.

To garner publicity ahead of the 1996 Summer Olympics, Williamson posed nude as part of a series of photographs showcased in the National Portrait Gallery. In 2003 she received funding from the National Lottery for the first time, allowing her to divide archery practice with part-time work as a primary school teacher at Church Stretton, Shropshire. The grants allowed her to become a full-time athlete in 2006.

In May 2012 she participated in the Olympic torch relay, acting as a torchbearer as it passed through the Shropshire town of Much Wenlock on the twelfth day of the route. The following month Williamson was appointed a Member of the Order of the British Empire for services to archery in the Queen's Birthday Honours.

Williamson married husband Will Conaghan in 2013. She is a member of the Long Mynd Archers club based in Shropshire. She is a graduate of Arizona State University and in 2000 listed Jamaican sprinter Merlene Ottey as her favourite sportsperson.

== Career ==
=== Olympic career ===
1992, 1996 and 2000 Summer Olympics

Williamson made her Olympic debut at the 1992 Summer Olympics in Barcelona, finishing the women's individual event in eighth place. Four years later at the 1996 Summer Olympics in Atlanta, she ended the individual competition in tenth position.

Williamson entered her third Olympic Games in 2000 with expectations that she would be a contender for a medal. She was however eliminated in the last sixteen of the women's individual event by the eventual gold medalist Yun Mi-jin of South Korea, who posted a new Olympic record score of 173 for an eighteen-arrow match to beat Williamson's own tournament best by nine points. Williamson had considered herself fortunate to have progressed as one of the last sixteen archers.

2004 Summer Olympics

The 2004 Summer Olympics in Athens marked the fourth time Williamson had contested an Olympic archery event. After advancing through the opening elimination rounds Williamson won a controversial quarter-final against China's He Ying, who shot her ninth arrow outside of the imposed time limit and had her tenth arrow's score voided as a penalty. Williamson was later defeated in the semi-finals by South Korea's Park Sung-hyun, and faced fellow losing semi-finalist Yuan Shu Chi of Chinese Taipei in the bronze medal match. After eleven arrows the pair were tied on points, but Williamson outshot Yuan on the twelfth and final arrow to win by a single point and claim her maiden Olympic medal. Her achievement marked the first Olympic archery medal won by Great Britain since 1992 and the first for a British woman since Sybil Newall in 1908.

2008 Summer Olympics

Williamson was announced to the British Olympic team for her fifth Olympics in June 2008. She was joined by Naomi Folkard and Charlotte Burgess in the women's individual and women's team events, the three having won gold medal at the 2008 Archery World Cup stage in the Dominican Republic earlier that year. In Beijing the three were successful in reaching the semi-finals of the women's team competition before a loss to China relegated them to the bronze medal match against France. Amid difficult weather conditions which postponed the match for 50 minutes, Williamson and her teammates performed below expectations and France emerged as the winners by two points over twenty-four arrows. Williamson was later eliminated from the women's individual event in a surprise defeat to Khatuna Lorig of the United States, who in their twelve-arrow encounter shot a score just two points shy of the Olympic record.

Speaking to the BBC after her defeats, Williamson admitted she was contemplating retiring from the sport. She however decided to continue to pursue a place at the 2012 Summer Olympics held in London, saying four years later that she felt "a real determination to take part because it was a home games."

2012 Summer Olympics

After having what the BBC called a "mixed" year in 2011, Williamson stated her goal going into 2012 was to qualify for the upcoming Summer Olympics held in London and expressed a particular desire to win gold medal in the women's team event. In June 2012 Williamson was again successful in being selected for the British Olympic team, equalling the British record set by fencer Bill Hoskyns and athlete Tessa Sanderson in competing in six consecutive Summer Olympic Games.

Williamson did not have a strong showing in London. She finished the preliminary ranking round for the women's individual event in forty-seventh place, a position the Evening Standard described as "disappointing", before being eliminated by Mongolia's Bishindee Urantungalag in the opening elimination round. Her participation in the women's team event also ended at the first stage after she and her teammates Naomi Folkard and Amy Oliver were defeated by Russia. After her defeat to Urantungalag, Williamson said she was undecided about whether to challenge for selection to a seventh Olympic Games in 2016.

=== Other competitions ===
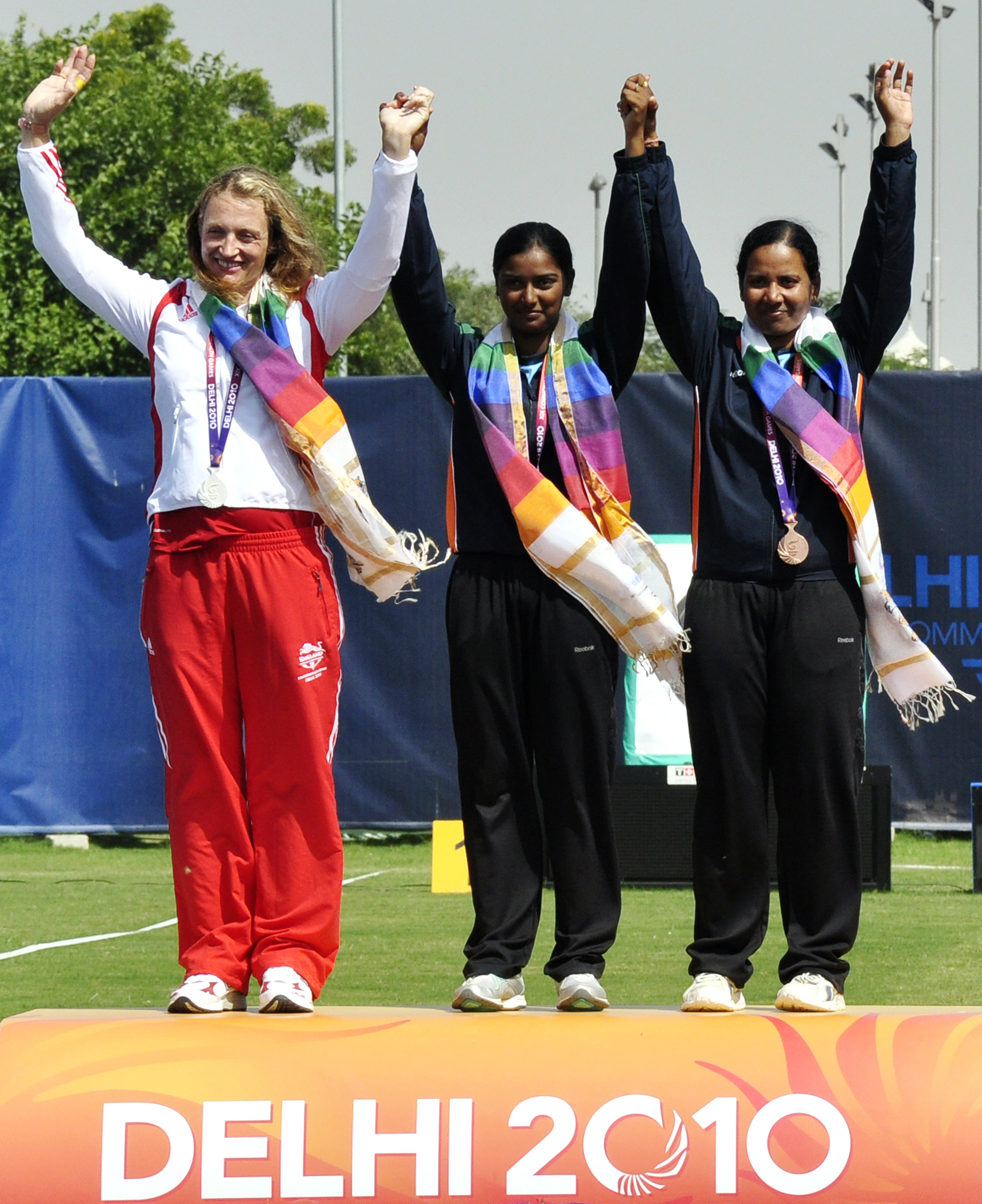
Williamson (left) during the medal ceremony for the women's individual recurve event at the 2010 Commonwealth Games

World Archery Championships

Williamson has won two medals at the World Archery Championships. In 1999 she finished with a silver medal, later calling it her "worst sporting moment" in an interview with The Daily Telegraph in 2004 after shooting below her expectations. In 2007 she and teammates Naomi Folkard and Charlotte Burgess secured bronze medal in the women's team recurve tournament, defeating Italy in the third-place match. By reaching the semi-finals they guaranteed a full berth of three female archers for the British team at the 2008 Summer Olympics.

2010 Commonwealth Games

Williamson won two silver medals at the 2010 Commonwealth Games in Delhi, reaching the final of both the women's individual and women's team recurve events. Despite the controversy over the conduct of the Indian crowd during the final of the team event, in which the spectators were criticised for distracting Williamson's teammate Amy Oliver while she shot her final arrow of the match, Williamson acknowledged that the opposing Indian team were "worthy winners" of the gold medal, saying "if you'd offered us silver on the plane on the way over here we possibly would have taken it". Her second silver medal came in the final of the individual competition, with India's Deepika Kumari defeating Williamson by six set points to zero.

=== Retirement ===
Following the 2012 Summer Olympics, Williamson said she no longer had the same motivation that had driven her to compete at previous Olympic Games, although victory at the national championships shortly afterwards forestalled an immediate retirement. After committing to a break from competitive archery before deciding whether to attempt for a record-breaking seventh Olympic Games, Williamson announced her retirement in April 2014. She cited her inability to "continue to dedicate the hours that are needed", adding "now the time is right to just concentrate on the day job".

== See also ==
- Bill Hoskyns – represented Great Britain at six consecutive Summer Olympics (1956–1976) in fencing
- Tessa Sanderson – represented Great Britain at six consecutive Summer Olympics (1976–1996) in the javelin throw
- Sybil Newall, Charlotte Dod and Beatrice Hill-Lowe – Great Britain's female archery medalists at the 1908 Summer Olympics
