= Guo Dan (archer) =

Chinese archer (born 1985)

Medal record

Women's recurve archery

Representing China

Olympic Games
Silver medal – second place	2008 Beijing	Team

Asian Championships
Silver medal – second place	2007 Xi'an	Individual

Guo Dan (Chinese: 郭丹; pinyin: Guō Dān; born December 20, 1985, in Tieling, Liaoning) is a Chinese female archer.

== 2008 Summer Olympics ==
At the 2008 Summer Olympics in Beijing Guo finished her ranking round with a total of 636 points. This gave her the 25th seed for the final competition bracket in which she faced Charlotte Burgess in the first round. Although Burgess was only the 40th seed she managed to upset Dan with 106-104 and she was eliminated.

Together with Chen Ling and Zhang Juanjuan she also took part in the team event. With her 636 score from the ranking round combined with the 645 of Chen and the 635 of Zhang the Chinese team was in third position after the ranking round, which gave them a straight seed into the quarter-finals. With 211-206 they were too strong for the Indian team. In the semi-final against Great Britain they scored 208 points with the British scoring 202, securing their final spot. Opponent South Korea came with a strong 224 points performance, resulting in the silver medal for China, as 215 points was not enough to claim the gold.
