= 2011 World Archery Championships – Women's individual recurve =

The women's individual recurve competition at the 2011 World Archery Championships took place on 4–10 July 2011 in Torino, Italy. 148 archers competed in the qualification round on 4 July; the top 104 archers qualified for the knockout tournament on 7–8 July, with the semi-finals and finals on 10 July. The tournament doubled as the principal qualification tournament for the 2012 Olympics.

In an open competition which saw just two of the top eight seeds reach the quarter-final, Chilean Denisse van Lamoen, ranked 36 in the qualification round, won the women's individual competition by defeating Kristine Esebua of Georgia in the final in four sets.

== Seeds ==
As well as securing qualification for the 2012 Olympics, the top eight scorers in the qualifying round were seeded, and received byes to the third round.

1. (South Korea) Ki Bo-bae (3rd round)
2. (South Korea) Jung Dasomi (Quarterfinal)
3. (China) Fang Yuting (3rd place)
4. (Chinese Taipei) Le Chien-ying (3rd round)
5. (Japan) Ren Hayakawa (4th round)
6. (Italy) Natalia Valeeva (3rd round)
7. (North Korea) Kwon Un-sil (3rd round)
8. (China) Xu Jing (3rd round)

== Draw ==
=== Top half ===
==== Section 1 ====
1st round
1	(South Korea) Ki Bo-bae
Bye
33	(Denmark) Maja Jager	2	2	1	2
80	(Canada) Kateri Vrakking	0	0	1	0
81	(Romania) Luminita Sarbu	2	2	0	0	0
32	(Mongolia) Bishindeegiin Urantungalag	0	0	2	2	2
17	(Russia) Natalia Erdyniyeva	2	2	2
96	(Mongolia) Enkhtuya Altangerel	0	0	0
65	(Moldova) Alexandra Mîrca	0	0	0
48	(Germany) Lisa Unruh	2	2	2
49	(Turkey) Natalia Nasaridze	2	1	0	2	0^{1}
64	(Venezuela) Lisbeth Leoni	0	1	2	0	2^{0}
97	(Mauritius) Veronique Marrier D'Unienville	0	2	0	0
16	(France) Bérengère Schuh	2	0	2	2

2nd round
1	(South Korea) Ki Bo-bae
Bye
33	(Denmark) Maja Jager	2	0	2	2
32	(Mongolia) Bishindeegiin Urantungalag	0	2	0	0
17	(Russia) Natalia Erdyniyeva	2	0	0	0
48	(Germany) Lisa Unruh	0	2	2	2
49	(Turkey) Natalia Nasaridze	0	1	2	0	0
16	(France) Bérengère Schuh	2	1	0	2	2

3rd round
1	(South Korea) Ki Bo-bae	2	2	0	0	0
33	(Denmark) Maja Jager	0	0	2	2	2
48	(Germany) Lisa Unruh	2	0	0	0
16	(France) Bérengère Schuh	0	2	2	2

4th round
33	(Denmark) Maja Jager	2	0	0	1	1
16	(France) Bérengère Schuh	0	2	2	1	1

==== Section 2 ====
1st round
9	(India) Deepika Kumari	2	2	2
104	(Thailand) Panumard Sukdee	0	0	0
57	(Slovenia) Najka Tomat	0	0	0
56	(Netherlands) Carrie Wegh	2	2	2
41	(Poland) Natalia Leśniak	2	2	0	2
72	(Kazakhstan) Olga Pilipova	0	0	2	0
89	(Finland) Tanja Sorsa	0	0	0
24	(Italy) Guendalina Sartori	2	2	2
25	(Russia) Inna Stepanova	2	2	0	2
88	(Slovenia) Ana Umer	0	0	2	0
73	(Switzerland) Celine Schobinger	2	0	2	0	0
40	(Belarus) Yekaterina Mulyuk-Timofeyeva	0	2	0	2	2
8	(China) Xu Jing
Bye

2nd round
9	(India) Deepika Kumari	2	2	2
56	(Netherlands) Carrie Wegh	0	0	0
41	(Poland) Natalia Leśniak	2	2	2
24	(Italy) Guendalina Sartori	0	0	0
25	(Russia) Inna Stepanova	0	0	2	2	0
40	(Belarus) Yekaterina Mulyuk-Timofeyeva	2	2	0	0	2
8	(China) Xu Jing
Bye

3rd round
9	(India) Deepika Kumari	1	2	0	0	2^{0}
41	(Poland) Natalia Leśniak	1	0	2	2	0^{1}
40	(Belarus) Yekaterina Mulyuk-Timofeyeva	2	0	2	1	2
8	(China) Xu Jing	0	2	0	1	0

4th round
41	(Poland) Natalia Leśniak	0	0	0
40	(Belarus) Yekaterina Mulyuk-Timofeyeva	2	2	2

==== Section 3 ====
1st round
5	(Japan) Ren Hayakawa
Bye
37	(Poland) Karina Lipiarska	1	0	0	2	0
76	(Romania) Simona Bancila	1	2	2	0	2
85	(Republic of Ireland) Maeve Reidy	0	0	0
28	(Ukraine) Viktoriya Koval	2	2	2
21	(Italy) Jessica Tomasi	0	2	2	2
92	(Switzerland) Valentine De Giuli	2	0	0	0
69	(Mongolia) Chuluun Oyunsuren	0	2	0	2	0
44	(Germany) Elena Richter	2	0	2	0	2
53	(United Kingdom) Alison Williamson	0	2	2	1	0^{0}
60	(Spain) Gema Buitron	2	0	0	1	2^{1}
101	(Czech Republic) Gabriela Sudrichova	2	0	0	0
12	(Georgia (country)) Khatuna Narimanidze	0	2	2	2

2nd round
5	(Japan) Ren Hayakawa
Bye
76	(Romania) Simona Bancila	0	0	0
28	(Ukraine) Viktoriya Koval	2	2	2
21	(Italy) Jessica Tomasi	0	1	2	2	2
44	(Germany) Elena Richter	2	1	0	0	0
60	(Spain) Gema Buitron	0	1	0	0
12	(Georgia (country)) Khatuna Narimanidze	2	1	2	2

3rd round
5	(Japan) Ren Hayakawa	0	2	0	1	2^{1}
28	(Ukraine) Viktoriya Koval	2	0	2	1	0^{0}
21	(Italy) Jessica Tomasi	2	1	0	0	2^{0}
12	(Georgia (country)) Khatuna Narimanidze	0	1	2	2	0^{1}

4th round
5	(Japan) Ren Hayakawa	0	1	1	1	0
12	(Georgia (country)) Khatuna Narimanidze	2	1	1	1	2

==== Section 4 ====
1st round
13	(Denmark) Carina Rosenvinge Christiansen	0	0	0
100	(Puerto Rico) Nadya Ruiz	2	2	2
61	(France) Celine Bezault	2	2	1	1
52	(Estonia) Anneli Preimann	0	0	1	1
45	(Spain) Magali Foulon	0	0	2	0
68	(North Korea) Ri On-uk	2	2	0	2
93	(Japan) Kaori Kawanaka	0	0	1	0
20	(United States) Khatuna Lorig	2	2	1	2
29	(Cyprus) Elena Mousikou	0	0	1	1
84	(Bulgaria) Dobromira Danailova	2	2	1	1
77	(Spain) Helena Fernandez	0	2	2	0	1^{0}
36	(Chile) Denisse van Lamoen	2	0	0	2	1^{1}
4	(Chinese Taipei) Le Chien-ying
Bye

2nd round
100	(Puerto Rico) Nadya Ruiz	2	2	0	0	0
61	(France) Celine Bezault	0	0	2	2	2
68	(North Korea) Ri On-uk	0	0	2	0
20	(United States) Khatuna Lorig	2	2	0	2
84	(Bulgaria) Dobromira Danailova	1	2	0	0	0
36	(Chile) Denisse van Lamoen	1	0	2	2	2
4	(Chinese Taipei) Le Chien-ying
Bye

3rd round
61	(France) Celine Bezault	0	0	0
20	(United States) Khatuna Lorig	2	2	2
36	(Chile) Denisse van Lamoen	2	0	2	2
4	(Chinese Taipei) Le Chien-ying	0	2	0	0

4th round
20	(United States) Khatuna Lorig	1	0	2	0	0
36	(Chile) Denisse van Lamoen	1	2	0	2	2

=== Bottom half ===
==== Section 5 ====
1st round
3	(China) Fang Yuting
Bye
35	(Ukraine) Nina Mylchenko	2	2	2
78	(Belarus) Elena Yachnik	0	0	0
83	(Republic of Ireland) Sinead Cuthbert	2	0	2	0	1^{1}
30	(Chinese Taipei) Yuan Shi-chi	0	2	0	2	1^{0}
19	(United Kingdom) Naomi Folkard	2	0	0	2	2
94	(Kazakhstan) Yelena Plotnikova	0	2	2	0	0
67	(Indonesia) Erwina Safitri	0	0	1	2	2^{1}
46	(Colombia) Natalia Sánchez	2	2	1	0	0^{0}
51	(Russia) Ksenia Perova	2	2	1	2
62	(Egypt) Amira Mansour	0	0	1	0
99	(Thailand) Waraporn Ueaaree	0	0	0
14	(Japan) Nami Hayakawa	2	2	2

2nd round
3	(China) Fang Yuting
Bye
35	(Ukraine) Nina Mylchenko	0	2	1	2	0^{1}
83	(Republic of Ireland) Sinead Cuthbert	2	0	1	0	2^{0}
19	(United Kingdom) Naomi Folkard	2	2	2
67	(Indonesia) Erwina Safitri	0	0	0
51	(Russia) Ksenia Perova	0	2	2	2
14	(Japan) Nami Hayakawa	2	0	0	0

3rd round
3	(China) Fang Yuting	0	2	2	2
35	(Ukraine) Nina Mylchenko	2	0	0	0
19	(United Kingdom) Naomi Folkard	0	0	0
51	(Russia) Ksenia Perova	2	2	2

4th round
3	(China) Fang Yuting	2	2	0	2
51	(Russia) Ksenia Perova	0	0	2	0

==== Section 6 ====
1st round
11	(South Korea) Han Gyeong-hee	0	2	2	2
102	(Latvia) Zane Berzina	2	0	0	0
59	(Turkey) Damla Ergin	0	0	1	2	0
54	(Germany) Karina Winter	2	2	1	0	2
43	(France) Cyrielle Cotry	0	2	2	0	2
70	(Sri Lanka) Dilhara Salgado	2	0	0	2	0
91	(Ecuador) Stefania Mora	0	0	2	1	2^{0}
22	(Mexico) Aída Román	2	2	0	1	0^{1}
27	(China) Zhu Shanshan	2	2	2
86	(Bangladesh) Mathui Prue Marma	0	0	0
75	(Georgia (country)) Asmat Diasamidze	0	0	2	0
38	(Kazakhstan) Farida Tukebaeva	2	2	0	2
6	(Italy) Natalia Valeeva
Bye

2nd round
11	(South Korea) Han Gyeong-hee	2	1	2	2
54	(Germany) Karina Winter	0	1	0	0
43	(France) Cyrielle Cotry	2	2	2
22	(Mexico) Aída Román	0	0	0
27	(China) Zhu Shanshan	2	0	2	1	1
38	(Kazakhstan) Farida Tukebaeva	0	2	0	1	1
6	(Italy) Natalia Valeeva
Bye

3rd round
11	(South Korea) Han Gyeong-hee	2	2	2
43	(France) Cyrielle Cotry	0	0	0
27	(China) Zhu Shanshan	2	1	2	2
6	(Italy) Natalia Valeeva	0	1	0	0

4th round
11	(South Korea) Han Gyeong-hee	2	2	2
27	(China) Zhu Shanshan	0	0	0

==== Section 7 ====
1st round
7	(North Korea) Kwon Un-sil
Bye
39	(Georgia (country)) Kristine Esebua	0	2	1	2	2
74	(Belarus) Alena Kuzniatzova	2	0	1	0	0
87	(Myanmar) Thin Thin Khaing	0	0	2	1	0
26	(India) Chekrovolu Swuro	2	2	0	1	2
23	(Poland) Justyna Mospinek	2	0	2	2
90	(Bangladesh) Beauty Ray	0	2	0	0
71	(Denmark) Louise Laursen	2	0	0	0
42	(Ukraine) Lidiia Sichenikova	0	2	2	2
55	(Chinese Taipei) Lin Chia-en	1	2	2	0	2
58	(Colombia) Sigrid Romero	1	0	0	2	0
103	(North Korea) Ryu Un-hyang	2	0	0	0
10	(United Kingdom) Amy Oliver	0	2	2	2

2nd round
7	(North Korea) Kwon Un-sil
Bye
39	(Georgia (country)) Kristine Esebua	2	1	2	1
26	(India) Chekrovolu Swuro	0	1	0	1
23	(Poland) Justyna Mospinek	0	2	1	0	2^{1}
42	(Ukraine) Lidiia Sichenikova	2	0	1	2	0^{0}
55	(Chinese Taipei) Lin Chia-en	0	2	0	0
10	(United Kingdom) Amy Oliver	2	0	2	2

3rd round
7	(North Korea) Kwon Un-sil	0	0	0
39	(Georgia (country)) Kristine Esebua	2	2	2
23	(Poland) Justyna Mospinek	0	2	0	2	1^{0}
10	(United Kingdom) Amy Oliver	2	0	2	0	1^{1}

4th round
39	(Georgia (country)) Kristine Esebua	2	0	2	0	2
10	(United Kingdom) Amy Oliver	0	2	0	2	0

==== Section 8 ====
1st round
15	(India) Bombayla Devi Laishram	2	2	2
98	(Sweden) Ida Andersson	0	0	0
63	(Estonia) Reena Pärnat	0	0	0
50	(Venezuela) Leidys Brito	2	2	2
47	(Sweden) Christine Bjerendal	1	0	1	2	2
66	(Turkey) Begül Löklüoğlu	1	2	1	0	0
95	(Mexico) Mariana Avitia	0	2	0	2	0
18	(United States) Miranda Leek	2	0	2	0	2
31	(United States) Jennifer Nichols	1	1	0	2	1^{1}
82	(Ecuador) Romina Quiroga	1	1	2	0	1^{0}
79	(Colombia) Ana Rendón	0	0	0
34	(Mexico) Alejandra Valencia	2	2	2
2	(South Korea) Jung Dasomi
Bye

2nd round
15	(India) Bombayla Devi Laishram	1	1	0	2	2
50	(Venezuela) Leidys Brito	1	1	2	0	0
47	(Sweden) Christine Bjerendal	0	2	0	0
18	(United States) Miranda Leek	2	0	2	2
31	(United States) Jennifer Nichols	2	0	2	2
34	(Mexico) Alejandra Valencia	0	2	0	0
2	(South Korea) Jung Dasomi
Bye

3rd round
15	(India) Bombayla Devi Laishram	2	0	1	0	0
18	(United States) Miranda Leek	0	2	1	2	2
31	(United States) Jennifer Nichols	0	0	0
2	(South Korea) Jung Dasomi	2	2	2

4th round
18	(United States) Miranda Leek	0	0	1	0
2	(South Korea) Jung Dasomi	2	2	1	2

== Finals ==
Quarterfinals
16	(France) Bérengère Schuh	2	1	1	2
40	(Belarus) Katsiaryna Timofeyeva	0	1	1	0
12	(Georgia (country)) Khatuna Narimanidze	0	0	0
36	(Chile) Denisse van Lamoen	2	2	2
3	(China) Fang Yuting	1	1	1	0	2^{1}
11	(South Korea) Han Gyeong-hee	1	1	1	2	0^{0}
39	(Georgia (country)) Kristine Esebua	2	2	1	0	1
2	(South Korea) Jung Dasomi	0	0	1	2	1

Semifinals
16	(France) Bérengère Schuh	0	0	1	1
36	(Chile) Denisse van Lamoen	2	2	1	1
3	(China) Fang Yuting	0	0	2	0
39	(Georgia (country)) Kristine Esebua	2	2	0	2

Finals
36	(Chile) Denisse van Lamoen	2	0	2	2
39	(Georgia (country)) Kristine Esebua	0	2	0	0
Third place
16	(France) Bérengère Schuh	0	0	1	0
3	(China) Fang Yuting	2	2	1	2
