= 2009 World Archery Championships – Women's individual recurve =

Women's archery competition

The women's individual recurve competition at the 2009 World Archery Championships took place on 3–9 September 2009 in Ulsan, South Korea. 97 archers took part in the qualification round on 3 September. As there were fewer than 128 entrants, all archers qualified for the 7-round knockout round on 6 September which was drawn according to their qualification round scores. The semi-finals and finals then took place on 9 September.

Like the men's competition, the final was an all-Korean affair, with third seed Joo Hyun-jung defeating first seeds Kwak Ye-ji by just one point. It marked the last World Archery Championships in which 12 arrow shoot-offs were used for the individual recurve competition elimination rounds; from 2011 the Olympic Round scoring system was adopted.

== Seeds ==
The top 31 qualifiers received byes to the second round.

1. (South Korea) Kwak Ye-ji (2nd place)
2. (South Korea) Yun Ok-hee (Quarterfinal)
3. (South Korea) Joo Hyun-jung (Champion)
4. (Poland) Justyna Mospinek (3rd round)
5. (China) Zhao Ling (2nd round)
6. (Chinese Taipei) Lin Hsiao-ying (4th round)
7. (United States) Jennifer Nichols (2nd round)
8. (Ukraine) Victoriya Koval (3rd round)
9. (Ukraine) Yulia Lobzhenidze (4th round)
10. (Germany) Karina Winter (3rd round)
11. (France) Bérengère Schuh (3rd round)
12. (Georgia (country)) Kristine Esebua (2nd round)
13. (Mexico) Aída Román (2nd round)
14. (Georgia (country)) Khatuna Narimanidze (2nd round)
15. (Canada) Marie-Pier Beaudet (2nd round)
16. (China) Zhu Jiani (4th round)
17. (Denmark) Maja Jager (2nd round)
18. (Chinese Taipei) Wu Hui-ju (2nd round)
19. (Italy) Natalia Valeeva (4th round)
20. (Poland) Karina Lipiarska (4th place)
21. (Chinese Taipei) Yuan Shu-chi (4th round)
22. (Denmark) Carina Christiansen (Quarterfinal)
23. (Colombia) Natalia Sánchez (3rd place)
24. (United States) Khatuna Lorig (3rd round)
25. (India) Rimil Buriuly (2nd round)
26. (China) Ouyang Ruyu (4th round)
27. (Spain) Magali Foulon (3rd round)
28. (United Kingdom) Naomi Folkard (2nd round)
29. (Colombia) Sigrid Romero (4th round)
30. (Kazakhstan) Anastassiya Bannova (3rd round)
31. (Switzerland) Celine Schobinger (2nd round)

== Draw ==
=== Top Half ===
==== Section 1 ====
1st round
1	(South Korea) Kwak Ye-ji
Bye
65	(Italy) Pia Carmen Lionetti	110
64	(Indonesia) Ika Yuliana Rochmawati	106
33	(Indonesia) Rina Dewi Puspitasari	104
96	(Portugal) Maria-Joao Ribeiro	85
97	(Portugal) Sofia Silva	66
32	(Russia) Natalya Erdyniyeva	110
17	(Denmark) Maja Jager
Bye
81	(Bulgaria) Plamena Mitkina	97
48	(Belarus) Hanna Marusava	100
49	(Canada) Kateri Vrakking	102
80	(Malaysia) Nur Amirah Mohamad	103
16	(China) Zhu Jiani
Bye

2nd round
1	(South Korea) Kwak Ye-ji	112
65	(Italy) Pia Carmen Lionetti	107
33	(Indonesia) Rina Dewi Puspitasari	107
32	(Russia) Natalya Erdyniyeva	109
17	(Denmark) Maja Jager	103
48	(Belarus) Hanna Marusava	105
80	(Malaysia) Nur Amirah Mohamad	97
16	(China) Zhu Jiani	106

3rd round
1	(South Korea) Kwak Ye-ji	111
32	(Russia) Natalya Erdyniyeva	104
48	(Belarus) Hanna Marusava	105
16	(China) Zhu Jiani	109

4th round
1	(South Korea) Kwak Ye-ji	103
16	(China) Zhu Jiani	102

==== Section 2 ====
1st round
9	(Ukraine) Yulia Lobzhenidze
Bye
73	(Spain) Beatriz Cabrero	101
56	(Georgia (country)) Asmat Diasamidze	99
41	(India) Dola Banerjee	106
88	(Singapore) Sook Wai Samantha Wong	102
24	(United States) Khatuna Lorig
Bye
25	(India) Rimil Buriuly
Bye
89	(Belgium) Freya Wolles	99
40	(Japan) Miki Kanie	106
57	(Australia) Deonne Bridger	96
72	(Singapore) Tan Liu Jie	97
8	(Ukraine) Victoriya Koval
Bye

2nd round
9	(Ukraine) Yulia Lobzhenidze	110
73	(Spain) Beatriz Cabrero	105
41	(India) Dola Banerjee	99
24	(United States) Khatuna Lorig	105
25	(India) Rimil Buriuly	105
40	(Japan) Miki Kanie	108
72	(Singapore) Tan Liu Jie	100
8	(Ukraine) Victoriya Koval	113

3rd round
9	(Ukraine) Yulia Lobzhenidze	103
24	(United States) Khatuna Lorig	102
40	(Japan) Miki Kanie	109
8	(Ukraine) Victoriya Koval	108

4th round
9	(Ukraine) Yulia Lobzhenidze	103
40	(Japan) Miki Kanie	112

==== Section 3 ====
1st round
5	(China) Zhao Ling
Bye
69	(United States) Kristin Braun	101
60	(Malaysia) Anbarasi Subramaniam	106
37	(Belarus) Elena Kunetsova	108
92	(Iran) Zahra Dehghanabnavi	97
28	(United Kingdom) Naomi Folkard
Bye
21	(Chinese Taipei) Yuan Shu-chi
Bye
85	(Bhutan) Sherab Zam	97
44	(Colombia) Ana Rendón	104
53	(France) Cyrielle Delamare	101
76	(South Africa) Karen Hultzer	97
12	(Georgia (country)) Kristine Esebua
Bye

2nd round
5	(China) Zhao Ling	98
60	(Malaysia) Anbarasi Subramaniam	111
37	(Belarus) Elena Kunetsova	109
28	(United Kingdom) Naomi Folkard	105
21	(Chinese Taipei) Yuan Shu-chi	106
44	(Colombia) Ana Rendón	105
53	(France) Cyrielle Delamare	105
12	(Georgia (country)) Kristine Esebua	102

3rd round
60	(Malaysia) Anbarasi Subramaniam	99
37	(Belarus) Elena Kunetsova	105
21	(Chinese Taipei) Yuan Shu-chi	107
53	(France) Cyrielle Delamare	99

4th round
37	(Belarus) Elena Kunetsova	108
21	(Chinese Taipei) Yuan Shu-chi	105

==== Section 4 ====
1st round
13	(Mexico) Aída Román
Bye
77	(Puerto Rico) Paloma Ramirez	100
52	(Russia) Tatyana Boroday	101
45	(Japan) Sayami Matsushita	104
84	(Kazakhstan) Yelena Li	98
20	(Poland) Karina Lipiarska
Bye
29	(Colombia) Sigrid Romero
Bye
93	(Sri Lanka) Dilhara Salgado	88
36	(United Kingdom) Alison Williamson	105
61	(Finland) Laura Kourula	103
68	(Turkey) Begünhan Elif Ünsal	96
4	(Poland) Justyna Mospinek
Bye

2nd round
13	(Mexico) Aída Román	105
52	(Russia) Tatyana Boroday	106
45	(Japan) Sayami Matsushita	101
20	(Poland) Karina Lipiarska	102
29	(Colombia) Sigrid Romero	107
36	(United Kingdom) Alison Williamson	105
61	(Finland) Laura Kourula	94
4	(Poland) Justyna Mospinek	112

3rd round
52	(Russia) Tatyana Boroday	108
20	(Poland) Karina Lipiarska	110
29	(Colombia) Sigrid Romero	109
4	(Poland) Justyna Mospinek	106

4th round
20	(Poland) Karina Lipiarska	106^{9;9}
29	(Colombia) Sigrid Romero	106^{9;7}

=== Bottom Half ===
==== Section 5 ====
1st round
3	(South Korea) Joo Hyun-jung
Bye
67	(Malaysia) Noor Aziera Taip	100
62	(Ukraine) Olena Kushniruk	96
35	(France) Sophie Dodemont	107
94	(Bhutan) Wangchuk Dema	92
30	(Kazakhstan) Anastassiya Bannova
Bye
19	(Italy) Natalia Valeeva
Bye
83	(Singapore) Tze Rong Vanessa Loh	97
46	(Kazakhstan) Farida Tukebayeva	102
51	(Russia) Tatiana Segina	104
78	(Turkey) Neslihan Cakiroglu	90
14	(Georgia (country)) Khatuna Narimanidze
Bye

2nd round
3	(South Korea) Joo Hyun-jung	115
67	(Malaysia) Noor Aziera Taip	98
35	(France) Sophie Dodemont	101
30	(Kazakhstan) Anastassiya Bannova	102
19	(Italy) Natalia Valeeva	108
46	(Kazakhstan) Farida Tukebayeva	106
51	(Russia) Tatiana Segina	107^{10}
14	(Georgia (country)) Khatuna Narimanidze	107^{9}

3rd round
3	(South Korea) Joo Hyun-jung	109
30	(Kazakhstan) Anastassiya Bannova	101
19	(Italy) Natalia Valeeva	110
51	(Russia) Tatiana Segina	104

4th round
3	(South Korea) Joo Hyun-jung	116
19	(Italy) Natalia Valeeva	109

==== Section 6 ====
1st round
11	(France) Bérengère Schuh
Bye
75	(Poland) Małgorzata Ćwienczek	101^{8;10;8*}
54	(Mexico) Itzel Orta	101^{8;10;8}
43	(Turkey) Begül Löklüoğlu	102
86	(Puerto Rico) Nadya Ruiz	103
22	(Denmark) Carina Rosenvinge Christiansen
Bye
27	(Spain) Magali Foulon
Bye
91	(Iran) Zahara Shams	96
38	(Spain) Gema Buitron	106
59	(Cyprus) Elena Mousikou	104^{9}
70	(United Kingdom) Charlotte Burgess	104^{10}
6	(Chinese Taipei) Lin Hsiao-ying
Bye

2nd round
11	(France) Bérengère Schuh	111
75	(Poland) Małgorzata Ćwienczek	101
86	(Puerto Rico) Nadya Ruiz	103
22	(Denmark) Carina Rosenvinge Christiansen	107
27	(Spain) Magali Foulon	107
38	(Spain) Gema Buitron	101
70	(United Kingdom) Charlotte Burgess	106
6	(Chinese Taipei) Lin Hsiao-ying	108

3rd round
11	(France) Bérengère Schuh	106
22	(Denmark) Carina Rosenvinge Christiansen	108
27	(Spain) Magali Foulon	103
6	(Chinese Taipei) Lin Hsiao-ying	107

4th round
22	(Denmark) Carina Rosenvinge Christiansen	109
6	(Chinese Taipei) Lin Hsiao-ying	106

==== Section 7 ====
1st round
7	(United States) Jennifer Nichols
Bye
71	(India) Pratima Boro	104^{8}
58	(Estonia) Anneli Preimann	104^{9}
39	(Germany) Elena Richter	106
90	(Uzbekistan) Surayo Vakilova	98
26	(China) Ouyang Ruyu
Bye
23	(Colombia) Natalia Sánchez
Bye
87	(Estonia) S Luik	92
42	(Germany) Christina Schaefer	105
55	(Australia) Jade Lindsay	100
74	(Republic of Ireland) Sinead Cuthbert	106
10	(Germany) Karina Winter
Bye

2nd round
7	(United States) Jennifer Nichols	108^{8}
58	(Estonia) Anneli Preimann	108^{10}
39	(Germany) Elena Richter	104
26	(China) Ouyang Ruyu	106
23	(Colombia) Natalia Sánchez	109
42	(Germany) Christina Schaefer	106
74	(Republic of Ireland) Sinead Cuthbert	94
10	(Germany) Karina Winter	110

3rd round
58	(Estonia) Anneli Preimann	103
26	(China) Ouyang Ruyu	111
23	(Colombia) Natalia Sánchez	104^{10}
10	(Germany) Karina Winter	104^{9}

4th round
26	(China) Ouyang Ruyu	106
23	(Colombia) Natalia Sánchez	113

==== Section 8 ====
1st round
15	(Canada) Marie-Pier Beaudet
Bye
79	(Indonesia) Erwina Safitri	103
60	(Japan) Asako Matsunaga	98
47	(Belarus) Katsiaryna Timofeyeva	106
82	(Belgium) Sabina Struyf	96
18	(Chinese Taipei) Wu Hui-ju
Bye
31	(Switzerland) Celine Schobinger
Bye
95	(Iran) Arezoo Heydari	96
34	(Italy) Elena Tonetta	103
63	(Canada) Alana MacDougall	100
66	(Mexico) Mariana Avitia	92
2	(South Korea) Yun Ok-hee
Bye

2nd round
15	(Canada) Marie-Pier Beaudet	99
79	(Indonesia) Erwina Safitri	103
47	(Belarus) Katsiaryna Timofeyeva	107^{10}
18	(Chinese Taipei) Wu Hui-ju	107^{8}
31	(Switzerland) Celine Schobinger	105^{6}
34	(Italy) Elena Tonetta	105^{10}
63	(Canada) Alana MacDougall	104
2	(South Korea) Yun Ok-hee	107

3rd round
79	(Indonesia) Erwina Safitri	93
47	(Belarus) Katsiaryna Timofeyeva	103
34	(Italy) Elena Tonetta	104
2	(South Korea) Yun Ok-hee	112

4th round
47	(Belarus) Katsiaryna Timofeyeva	107
2	(South Korea) Yun Ok-hee	109

== Finals ==
Quarterfinals
1	(South Korea) Kwak Ye-ji	108
40	(Japan) Miki Kanie	104
37	(Belarus) Elena Kuznetsova	107
20	(Poland) Karina Lipiarska	109
3	(South Korea) Joo Hyun-jung	111
22	(Denmark) Carina Christiansen	105
23	(Colombia) Natalia Sánchez	107
2	(South Korea) Yun Ok-hee	106

Semifinals
1	(South Korea) Kwak Ye-ji	109
20	(Poland) Karina Lipiarska	105
3	(South Korea) Joo Hyun-jung	112
23	(Colombia) Natalia Sánchez	102

Finals
1	(South Korea) Kwak Ye-ji	112
3	(South Korea) Joo Hyun-jung	113
Third place
20	(Poland) Karina Lipiarska	99
23	(Colombia) Natalia Sánchez	105
