= Archery at the 2014 Asian Games – Women's individual recurve =

Women's individual recurve at the 2014 Asian Games
- Venue: Gyeyang Asiad Archery Field
- Dates: 23–28 September 2014
- Competitors: 56 from 18 nations

Medalists
gold medal	Jung Dasomi	South Korea
silver medal	Chang Hye-jin	South Korea
bronze medal	Xu Jing	China

The women's individual recurve archery event at the 2014 Asian Games was held from 23 to 28 September at the Gyeyang Asiad Archery Field in Incheon, South Korea. It was the tenth time the event was held as part of the Asian Games sports programme since the debut of archery in 1978. A total of 56 archers from 18 nations qualified for the event. Yun Ok-hee of South Korea was the defending champion.

The women's individual recurve event was an outdoor recurve target archery event held to the World Archery-approved rules. The competition consisted of three stages spread over one week: an initial ranking round, a four-round single-elimination tournament, and two finals matches, the last of which deciding the winners of the gold, silver, and bronze medals. The ranking round determined the seeds for the subsequent elimination rounds and followed the 1440 format, in which archers each shot a total of 144 arrows at 122 cm-wide targets over four different distances, firing 36 arrows from 70 metres, 60 metres, 50 metres, and 30 metres respectively. The archer scoring highest total from her 144 arrows received the number one seed, the archer with the second highest total receiving second seed, and so on. In the event of a tie between two or more archers, the number of arrows shot in the central 10-ring of the target was taken into account, with the number of arrows shot within the inner-10 (or X) ring used as a second tiebreaker if necessary. A maximum of two archers from each nation were allowed progress to the elimination rounds.

The format of the elimination and medal-deciding rounds followed the Archery Olympic Round set system used in international competitions since 2010. Each match consisted of a maximum of five sets, with archers each shooting three arrows per set at the same 122-cm wide targets from a fixed distance of 70 metres. The archer with the greater score from their three arrows won the set, earning two set points. The archer with the lower score in each set received zero points. If the score was tied, each archer received one point. The first archer to reach six set points was declared the winner. If the match was tied at five set points each after the maximum five sets were played, a single tie-breaker arrow was used with the closest to centre of the target winning.

After securing every gold medal available in the archery competition at the 2006 and 2010 Asian Games, the Korean national team aimed to defend each of their five recurve titles for the second time in succession. Chang Hye-jin, Jung Dasomi, Joo Hyun-jung, and Lee Tuk-young were chosen to compete in the women's events after finishing in the top four positions in the Korean national team selection held earlier in 2014, beating both the reigning Olympic champion Ki Bo-bae and the defending Asian Games champion Yun Ok-hee to represent their nation.

The semi-finals commenced on the afternoon of 28 September following the conclusion of the team recurve events, in which Chang, Jung, and Lee emerged victorious over the Chinese trio of Cheng, Xu, and Zhu to take the gold medal.

The medal matches took place after the semi-finals. As the two losing archers from the semi-finals, Xu faced Hayakawa in the bronze medal match. Xu emerged the winner, posting three successive set victories to come from two set points down to defeat the Japanese archer. The all-Korean gold medal match followed afterwards and saw Jung comprehensively defeat Chang with a consistency that Chang struggled to match. Although Chang was able to tie the second set, Jung missed the central 10 ring just twice in her twelve shots, earning a standing ovation from the home crowd with a perfect score of 30 in the fourth and final set to claim her second Asian Games gold medal of the day.

== Schedule ==
All times are Korea Standard Time (UTC+09:00)

Date	Time	Event
Tuesday, 23 September 2014	10:00	Ranking round
Wednesday, 24 September 2014	10:00	Ranking round
Friday, 26 September 2014	11:10	1/16 eliminations
Friday, 26 September 2014	11:40	1/8 eliminations
Friday, 26 September 2014	15:50	Quarterfinals
Sunday, 28 September 2014	14:30	Semifinals
Sunday, 28 September 2014	15:30	Bronze medal match
Sunday, 28 September 2014	15:44	Gold medal match

== Results ==
=== Ranking round ===
Rank	Seed	Athlete	Distance				Total	10s	Xs
Rank	Seed	Athlete	90m	70m	50m	30m	Total	10s	Xs
1	1	Jung Dasomi (KOR)	342	341	327	354	1364	76	42
2	2	Chang Hye-jin (KOR)	333	341	334	351	1359	75	31
3	—	Lee Tuk-young (KOR)	331	343	328	356	1358	81	34
4	3	Xu Jing (CHN)	337	337	332	346	1352	80	29
5	4	Cheng Ming (CHN)	331	344	323	350	1348	78	26
6	—	Zhu Jueman (CHN)	327	341	326	350	1344	67	26
7	5	Ren Hayakawa (JPN)	320	338	329	352	1339	68	22
8	6	Deepika Kumari (IND)	324	339	326	348	1337	62	26
9	7	Yuan Shu-chi (TPE)	327	337	322	346	1332	65	24
10	8	Lin Chia-en (TPE)	334	333	328	337	1332	57	18
11	9	Kaori Kawanaka (JPN)	332	338	320	338	1328	60	23
12	—	Yuki Hayashi (JPN)	323	336	321	347	1327	58	25
13	—	Joo Hyun-jung (KOR)	310	341	321	352	1324	69	27
14	—	Zhang Dan (CHN)	327	331	318	348	1324	62	20
15	10	Laxmirani Majhi (IND)	320	332	316	351	1319	58	19
16	11	Diananda Choirunisa (INA)	324	332	313	349	1318	63	22
17	12	Kang Un-ju (PRK)	321	330	316	341	1308	55	16
18	13	Altangereliin Enkhtuyaa (MGL)	308	327	325	345	1305	57	21
19	—	Lei Chien-ying (TPE)	323	333	306	340	1302	59	24
20	—	Bombayla Devi Laishram (IND)	318	325	314	344	1301	51	12
21	14	Farida Tukebayeva (KAZ)	312	327	316	342	1297	52	21
22	15	Luiza Saidiyeva (KAZ)	309	331	319	338	1297	45	16
23	16	Ika Yuliana Rochmawati (INA)	317	326	313	338	1294	43	15
24	—	Yang Nien-hsiu (TPE)	309	328	315	340	1292	44	18
25	—	Erwina Safitri (INA)	320	327	300	338	1285	44	18
26	17	Lộc Thị Đào (VIE)	313	327	302	340	1282	46	14
27	18	Bishindeegiin Urantungalag (MGL)	299	331	302	342	1274	44	13
28	19	Choe Song-hui (PRK)	307	318	305	343	1273	49	21
29	—	Titik Kusuma Wardani (INA)	299	322	312	340	1273	40	16
30	—	Pranitha Vardhineni (IND)	303	316	307	345	1271	44	14
31	—	Ri Un-ok (PRK)	309	324	301	337	1271	42	12
32	20	Mathui Prue Marma (BAN)	304	324	301	340	1269	45	10
33	—	Ayano Kato (JPN)	304	326	308	330	1268	41	14
34	21	Nguyễn Thị Quyền Trang (VIE)	300	334	295	337	1266	39	10
35	—	Ryu Un-hyang (PRK)	298	320	303	343	1264	40	13
36	22	Shamoli Ray (BAN)	298	319	298	337	1252	38	10
37	—	Yelena Li (KAZ)	299	322	295	334	1250	37	11
38	—	Dương Thị Kim Liên (VIE)	301	314	307	324	1246	40	7
39	—	Aruzhan Abdrazak (KAZ)	290	317	295	343	1245	41	9
40	23	Asel Sharbekova (KGZ)	300	311	295	330	1236	38	10
41	24	Rand Saad (IRQ)	308	311	285	324	1228	40	10
42	25	Zar Khyi Win (MYA)	270	311	297	320	1198	27	7
43	—	Danzandorjiin Miroslava (MGL)	312	315	287	283	1197	33	8
44	26	Firuza Zubaydova (TJK)	291	299	260	335	1185	30	10
45	27	Munira Nurmanova (UZB)	283	313	262	325	1183	24	10
46	—	Jargalsaikhany Dagiijanchiv (MGL)	284	293	285	312	1174	29	10
47	28	Irina Savinova (UZB)	256	302	278	325	1161	16	6
48	—	Beauty Ray (BAN)	279	283	261	324	1147	21	5
49	29	Aisha Tamang (NEP)	280	302	250	305	1137	22	7
50	—	Khilola Yunusova (UZB)	247	292	272	323	1134	29	2
51	30	Monica Rana Magar (NEP)	248	292	264	322	1126	15	3
52	—	Madina Akramova (UZB)	254	255	273	304	1086	16	5
53	—	Rabeya Khatun (BAN)	278	277	247	281	1083	18	5
54	—	Krishna Maya Syangtan (NEP)	290	302	190	291	1073	24	6
55	31	Choki Wangmo (BHU)	229	289	249	303	1070	21	7
56	—	Renu Lama (NEP)	243	258	223	302	1026	13	6

=== Knockout round ===
==== Finals ====
Semifinals
1	Jung Dasomi (KOR)	28	29	30	28	29	7
5	Ren Hayakawa (JPN)	27	30	28	28	26	3
3	Xu Jing (CHN)	28	29	27	28	2
2	Chang Hye-jin (KOR)	28	29	29	29	6

Gold medal match
1	Jung Dasomi (KOR)	30	29	29	30	7
2	Chang Hye-jin (KOR)	28	29	28	28	1
Bronze medal match
5	Ren Hayakawa (JPN)	27	28	26	26	27	3
3	Xu Jing (CHN)	27	27	28	27	28	7

==== Section 1 ====
1/16 eliminations
17	Lộc Thị Đào (VIE)	27	27	25	27	6
16	Ika Yuliana Rochmawati (INA)	27	26	25	25	2
9	Kaori Kawanaka (JPN)	26	29	28	28	7
24	Rand Saad (IRQ)	26	23	23	21	1
25	Zar Khyi Win (MYA)	25	24	25	28	27	4
8	Lin Chia-en (TPE)	23	26	26	27	28	6

1/8 eliminations
1	Jung Dasomi (KOR)	24	28	29	28	6
17	Lộc Thị Đào (VIE)	26	23	27	27	2
9	Kaori Kawanaka (JPN)	27	27	29	30	7
8	Lin Chia-en (TPE)	26	27	28	28	1

Quarterfinals
1	Jung Dasomi (KOR)	27	29	30	29	30	6
9	Kaori Kawanaka (JPN)	28	28	30	29	27	4

==== Section 2 ====
1/16 eliminations
5	Ren Hayakawa (JPN)	26	26	25	6
28	Irina Savinova (UZB)	22	20	23	0
21	Nguyễn Thị Quyền Trang (VIE)	26	27	26	28	27	6
12	Kang Un-ju (PRK)	28	27	26	25	26	4
13	Altangereliin Enkhtuyaa (MGL)	22	26	23	26	24	4
20	Mathui Prue Marma (BAN)	25	23	25	25	27	6
29	Aisha Tamang (NEP)	20	17	18	0
4	Cheng Ming (CHN)	25	25	26	6

1/8 eliminations
5	Ren Hayakawa (JPN)	26	29	28	25	25	9	6
21	Nguyễn Thị Quyền Trang (VIE)	27	25	26	29	25	8	5
20	Mathui Prue Marma (BAN)	28	25	28	25	2
4	Cheng Ming (CHN)	29	28	27	28	6

Quarterfinals
5	Ren Hayakawa (JPN)	29	26	28	26	6
4	Cheng Ming (CHN)	24	28	27	15	2

==== Section 3 ====
1/16 eliminations
3	Xu Jing (CHN)	27	27	27	6
30	Monica Rana Magar (NEP)	22	19	15	0
19	Choe Song-hui (PRK)	22	23	26	0
14	Farida Tukebayeva (KAZ)	25	28	28	6
11	Diananda Choirunisa (INA)	28	26	23	29	6
22	Shamoli Ray (BAN)	25	24	26	23	2
27	Munira Nurmanova (UZB)	22	26	23	0
6	Deepika Kumari (IND)	28	28	27	6

1/8 eliminations
3	Xu Jing (CHN)	27	27	27	27	27	6
14	Farida Tukebayeva (KAZ)	26	29	26	28	23	4
11	Diananda Choirunisa (INA)	27	26	29	6
6	Deepika Kumari (IND)	25	24	27	0

Quarterfinals
3	Xu Jing (CHN)	24	23	26	24	26	6
11	Diananda Choirunisa (INA)	20	25	24	24	26	4

==== Section 4 ====
1/16 eliminations
7	Yuan Shu-chi (TPE)	27	26	23	27	7
26	Firuza Zubaydova (TJK)	16	26	20	23	1
23	Asel Sharbekova (KGZ)	18	24	25	0
10	Laxmirani Majhi (IND)	27	27	30	6
15	Luiza Saidiyeva (KAZ)	21	27	23	23	6
18	Bishindeegiin Urantungalag (MGL)	23	24	22	20	2
31	Choki Wangmo (BHU)	25	20	24	0
2	Chang Hye-jin (KOR)	28	28	25	6

1/8 eliminations
7	Yuan Shu-chi (TPE)	27	28	26	26	27	4
10	Laxmirani Majhi (IND)	27	27	27	27	27	6
15	Luiza Saidiyeva (KAZ)	24	24	23	27	1
2	Chang Hye-jin (KOR)	29	28	23	28	7

Quarterfinals
10	Laxmirani Majhi (IND)	25	28	27	28	2
2	Chang Hye-jin (KOR)	27	27	28	29	6
