= Archery at the 2012 Summer Olympics – Women's individual =

Women's individual at the Games of the XXX Olympiad
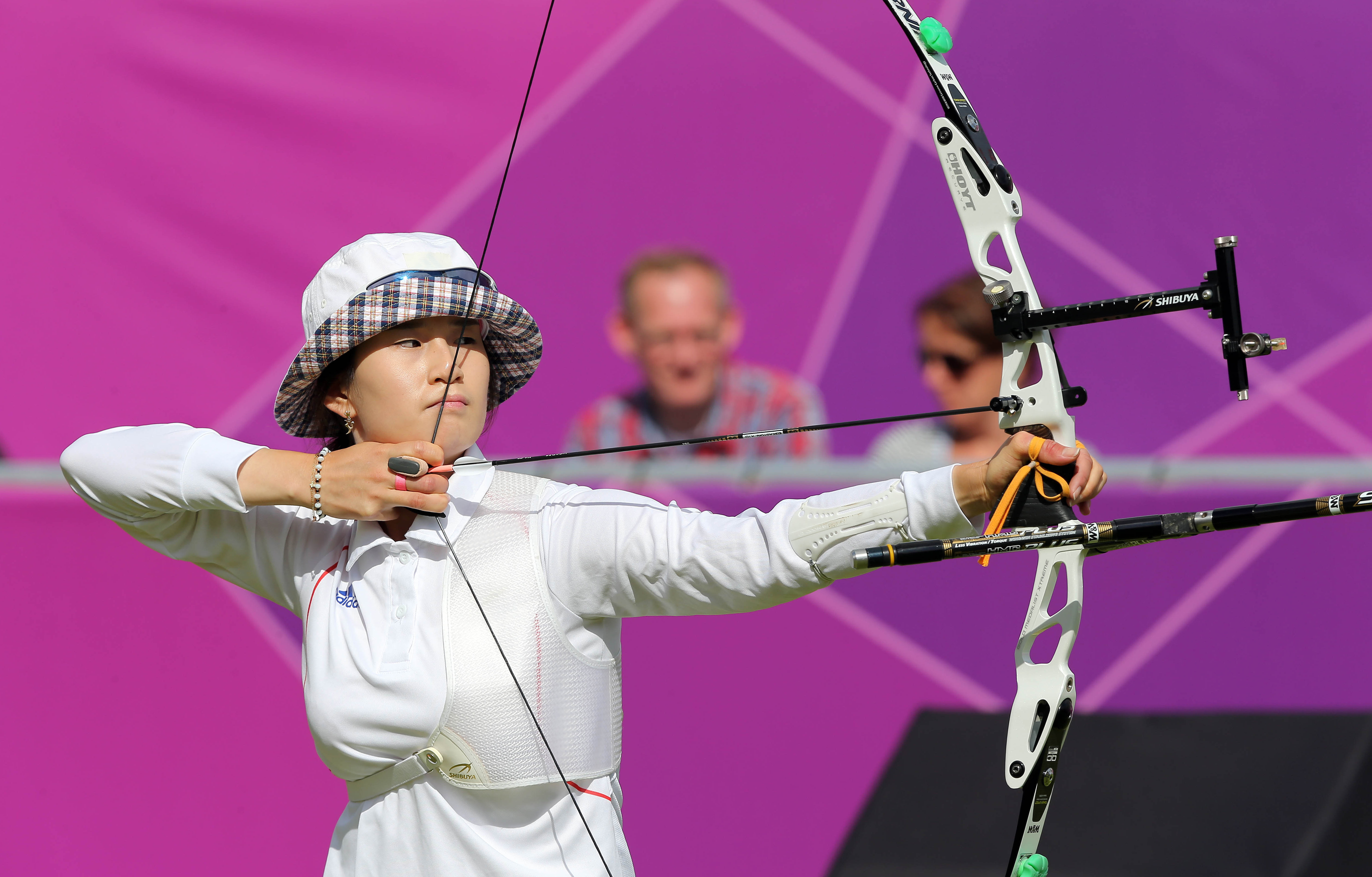
- Gold medallist Ki Bo-bae during the event
- Venue: Lord's Cricket Ground
- Dates: 27 July – 2 August 2012
- Competitors: 64 from 40 nations

Medalists
1st place, gold medalist(s)		Ki Bo-bae	South Korea
2nd place, silver medalist(s)		Aída Román	Mexico
3rd place, bronze medalist(s)		Mariana Avitia	Mexico

The women's individual archery event at the 2012 Olympic Games was held from 27 July to 2 August 2012 at Lord's Cricket Ground in London in the United Kingdom. The event was one of four which comprised the 2012 Olympic archery programme of sports and was the eleventh time the women's individual competition was contested as an Olympic event. Forty nations qualified for the competition, sending a total of sixty-four archers to compete. The defending Olympic champion from 2008 was Zhang Juanjuan of China, who did not compete following her retirement in 2010.

Ki Bo-Bae of South Korea won the gold medal, defeating Mexico's Aída Román in a one-arrow shoot-off to become her nation's seventh female archer to become individual Olympic champion. Mariana Avitia of Mexico finished third, defeating Khatuna Lorig of the United States to win the bronze medal. Román and Avitia became the first Mexican archers to ever win an Olympic medal.

== Background ==
The women's individual event has been held as part of every Summer Olympics archery programme since the 1972 Games in Munich. Since the 1984 Summer Olympics, archers from South Korea had dominated the event, claiming six of the previous seven gold medals. Their winning streak was broken at the 2008 Summer Olympics in Beijing when Zhang Juanjuan defeated defending Olympic champion Park Sung-hyun in the final, becoming the first non-South Korean archer to win the women's individual gold medal since Keto Losaberidze of the Soviet Union in 1980.

In October 2011 an official test event, the London Archery Classic, was held at the Lord's Cricket Ground to evaluate the venue's preparations and give archers and coaches the chance to familiarise themselves with the location and schedule ahead of the Games the following year. Jung Dasomi of South Korea, who held the top position in the World Archery rankings, won the women's individual event, defeating Poland's Justyna Mospinek in the final. Ki Bo-bae of South Korea won the bronze medal ahead of Japan's Ren Hayakama.

=== Qualification ===
Sixty-four places were available for the event with each National Olympic Committee (NOC) being represented by a maximum of three archers. Qualification was primarily achieved through the World Archery Championships held in Turin in July 2011, with the remaining places allocated to the nations of most successful athletes at a series of continental championships held between October 2011 and May 2012. (Note: Places won at the qualifying tournaments were assigned to the NOCs of the successful archers. The NOCs were then responsible for selecting the archers to compete at the Olympic Games.) As host nation Great Britain qualified three places automatically; ten other nations (China, Denmark, India, Italy, Japan, Mexico, Russia, South Korea, Chinese Taipei, and Ukraine) additionally qualified the maximum berth of archers.

Great Britain's national selection trials saw Olympic debutante Amy Oliver and two-time Olympian Naomi Folkard succeed to partner 2004 Olympic bronze medalist Alison Williamson, who became the third British athlete to be selected for a sixth Olympic Games, having made her debut at the 1992 Summer Olympics in Barcelona. Chekrovolu Swuro and the highly rated 18-year old Deepika Kumari joined 2008 Olympian Bombayla Devi Laishram to spearhead the Indian contingent, the trio having together won silver medal in the women's team event at the 2011 World Archery Championships after defeating the reigning champions South Korea in the semi-finals.

== Format ==
An official World Archery target is divided into ten evenly-spaced concentric rings. An arrow landing in the outermost ring wins one point; striking the centre yellow circle earns the maximum ten points.

The women's individual was an outdoor recurve target archery event. Held under the World Archery-approved rules, archers shot at a 122 cm-wide target from a distance of 70 metres with between one and ten points being awarded for each arrow depending on how close it landed to the centre of the target. The competition consisted of three stages: an initial ranking round, five elimination rounds, and two finals matches deciding the medal placings. In the ranking round, each of the 64 archers entering the competition shot a total of 72 arrows. The total score of each archer was used to seed the archers into the following five-round single-elimination tournament according to their finishing position, the highest-scoring archer receiving the number one seed.

The elimination rounds introduced a new format, the Archery Olympic Round, to the Olympic Games. From 1992 until 2008, the elimination matches were decided by each archer shooting 12 arrows, the highest cumulative score determining who progressed to the next round. Approved in 2009 by the sport's governing body, the World Archery Federation, the new Archery Olympic Round was designed to sustain audience interest throughout the knockout matches and prevent encounters from being decided prematurely from a single poor shot. According to the new system, each match consisted of a maximum of five sets, with archers each shooting three arrows per set. The archer with the best score from their three arrows won the set, earning two points. The archer with the lowest score in each set received zero points. If the score was tied, each archer received one point. The first archer to six points was declared the winner. If the match was tied 5-5 after the maximum 5 sets were played, a single tie-breaker arrow was used with the closest to centre of the target winning.

=== Schedule ===
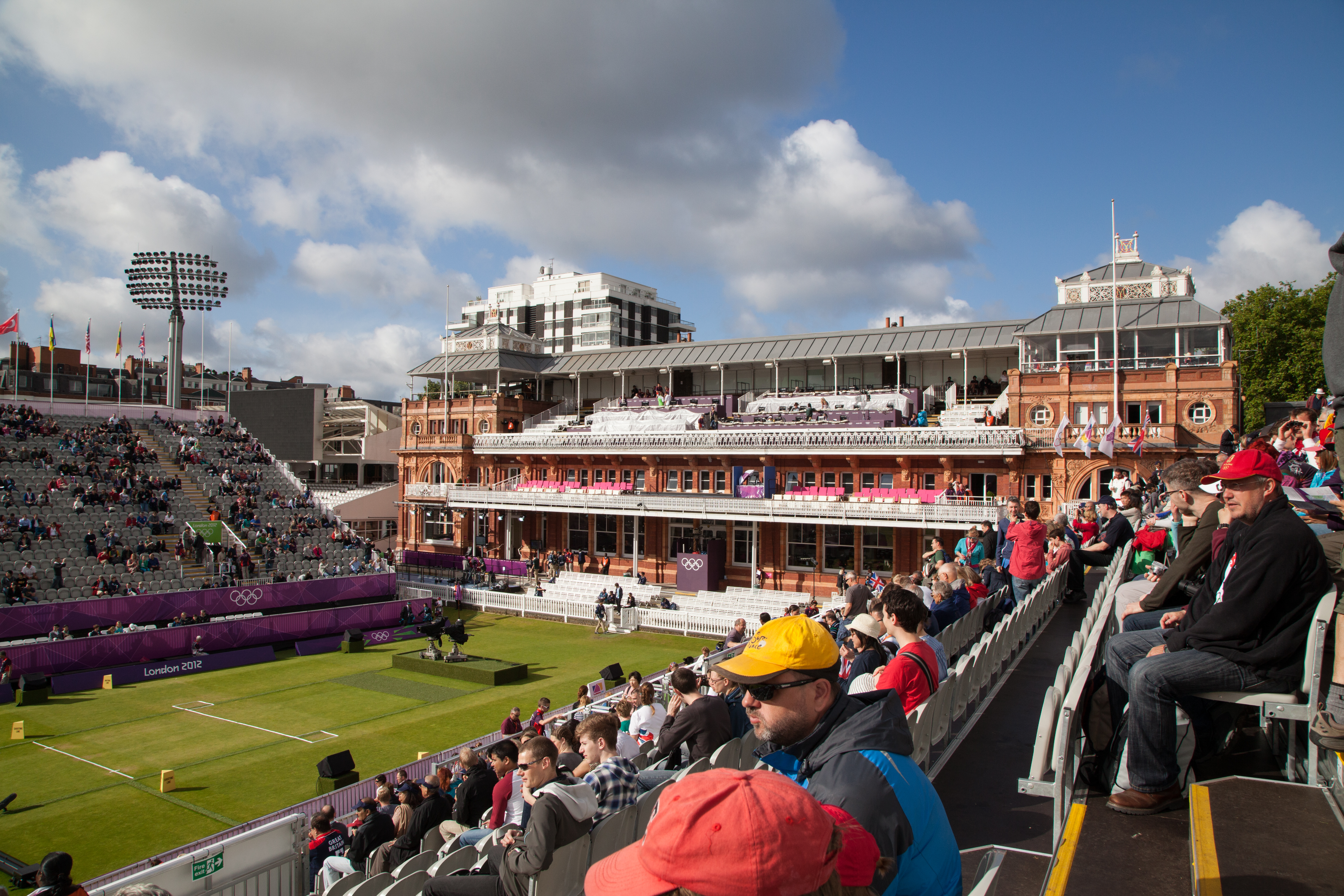
The Lord's Pavilion at Lord's Cricket Ground provided the backdrop for the London 2012 archery competitions.

Day	Date	Time	Stage
0	Friday, 27 July 2012	13:00–15:00	Ranking round
3	Monday, 30 July 2012	09:00–12:55; 15:00–17:40	1/32 elimination round 1/16 elimination round
4	Tuesday, 31 July 2012	09:00–12:55; 15:00–17:40	1/32 elimination round 1/16 elimination round
5	Wednesday, 1 August 2012	09:00–12:55; 15:00–17:40	1/32 elimination round 1/16 elimination round
6	Thursday, 2 August 2012	09:00–10:44	1/8 elimination round
6	Thursday, 2 August 2012	14:00–14:52	Quarter-finals
6	Thursday, 2 August 2012	14:52–15:05	Semi-finals
6	Thursday, 2 August 2012	15:21–15:50	Bronze medal match
6	Thursday, 2 August 2012	15:21–15:50	Gold medal match
All times are British Summer Time (UTC+01:00). Source:

== Report ==
=== Pre-event ===
In a preview of the archery competitions published a couple of weeks before the beginning of the Games, the Korea Herald expressed some reservation about the chances of a South Korean victory in the women's individual event. Although they suggested the women's team should be "supremely confident" of a gold medal in their event, the failure to win the individual gold medal in 2008 and the rise of India's Deepika Kumari were highlighted as concerns going forward into the event. Kumari, who was cited by the Hindustan Times as India's best chance at winning an individual archery medal, in turn was confident that her experience against the Koreans in Archery World Cup matches would serve her well. Speaking at a ceremony marking the departure of athletes to London, she added that her recently acquired status of world number one would only be justified if she came away from the Games having earned an Olympic medal.

=== Ranking round ===
The competition began with the ranking round in the afternoon of Friday 27 July, preceding the opening ceremony held later that evening. Ki Bo-bae, Lee Sung-jin, and Tan Ya-ting each tied on 671 points and were only separated by the number of arrows landing in the 10-ring, Ki claiming number one seed with thirty-one 10-scores ahead of Lee and Tan. South Korea's third archer Choi Hyeon-ju struggled with nerves on her Olympic debut and finished 21st overall after being ranked 38th at the round's halfway point. Despite claiming two of the highest seeds for the elimination rounds, Jang Young-sool, the head of the South Korean archery coaching team, was nevertheless disappointed that his archers did not post higher scores. The three British archers had a disappointing ranking round on home soil, Naomi Folkard finishing highest, claiming the 42nd seed.

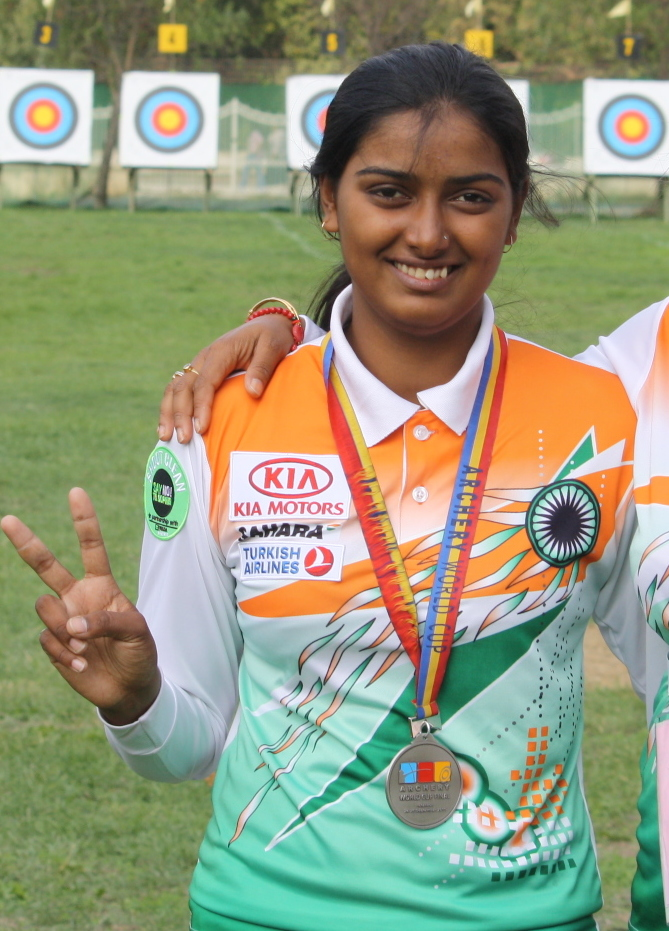
World number one Deepika Kumari (pictured in 2011) was eliminated in the opening knockout round.

=== Elimination rounds ===
World number one Deepika Kumari suffered a shock defeat in the opening elimination round which began on the morning of 30 July, losing to 57th seed Amy Oliver of Great Britain in four sets. Kumari blamed the strong winds for her performance and did not appear comfortable in the cool and overcast conditions, failing to shoot a single arrow in the 10-ring. Her defeat was described by the Press Trust of India as a big setback in India's pursuit of Olympic medals, while the BBC lauded Oliver's victory as her greatest career win. Oliver would later lose to Indonesia's Ika Yuliana Rochmawati in the following round. Oliver's teammates Alison Williamson and Folkard fared little better in front of the home crowd, Williamson losing in the first knockout round to Bishindee Urantungalag of Mongolia, while Folkard was eliminated by Mexico's Mariana Avitia in the 1/16 elimination round. The first elimination round also saw Bhutan's participation at the Olympic Games end with Serhab Zam's defeat to Lorig of the United States, the nation having sent just two athletes to London.

The final rounds took place on Thursday, 2 August. In the 1/8 elimination round Bérengère Schuh, the sole Frenchwoman in the field, defeated Choi in a one-arrow shoot-off after the South Korean came back from four set points down to tie the match in the fifth set. With windy conditions developing in the afternoon in time for the quarter-finals, Lorig defeated Schuh after a poor third set by the Frenchwoman, who was unable to fully master the conditions, while Avitia emerged as the surprise victor against second-seed Lee. Lee's exit marked the first time since the 1996 Summer Olympics that South Korea failed to win at least two medals in the women's individual event.

Ki, the sole South Korean to advance to the semi-finals, dispatched Khatuna Lorig following an upgraded score of one of her arrows after a review in the fourth set. The second semi-final featured Avitia and Román, guaranteeing at least one medal for the Mexican archery contingent. Román advanced to the final against Ki, while Avitia went on to contest the bronze medal match with Lorig.

=== Medal matches ===
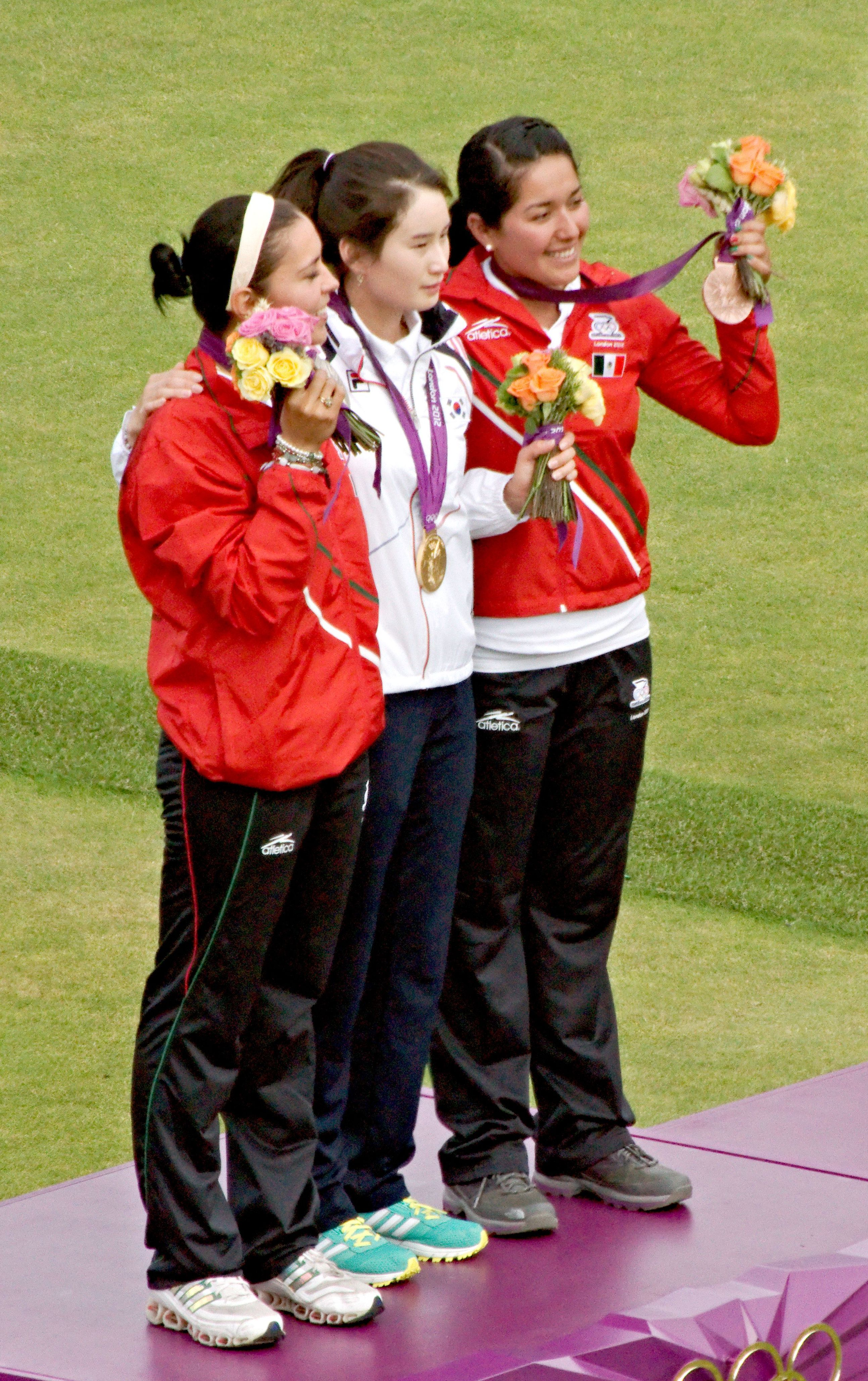
Ki Bo-bae (centre), Aída Román (left), and Mariana Avitia (right) during the medal presentation ceremony.

Avitia appeared more comfortable with the shifting winds in the bronze medal match, which began just after 3:20 pm on 2 August, scoring a perfect 30 in the first set and ultimately winning in four sets after Lorig shot a six with her final arrow. Lorig nevertheless managed a shot so precise to the centre of the target that the arrow bounced off the target after striking the camera hole. Three years later the American reflected that she did not have enough time to recover from her semi-final loss to Ki and was unable to properly focus against Avitia, beginning the bronze medal match just fifteen minutes after bowing out of the semi-finals. She commented "I was so upset not making that gold medal match... [i]t happened so quick, I didn’t have time to talk to anyone. There was no one to tell me, 'Hey, snap out of it.'" Avitia's victory gave Mexico its first ever Olympic archery medal.

The gold medal match between Ki and Román was a close affair. After winning one set apiece with a tie in the second set, Ki shot a perfect 30 in the fourth, only for Román to outscore Ki 27–26 in the fifth and final set, necessitating a shoot-off. Both Ki and Román landed their arrows into the 8-ring, but Ki's was judged to be marginally closer to the centre, giving her the victory.

Ki's win was the seventh time in eight Olympic women's individual events that South Korea had claimed the top honour, and the fourteenth archery gold medal from a possible fifteen for the country since the 1984 Summer Olympics. A tearful Ki later apologised during a press conference after she had been awarded her the gold medal, stating that "Koreans do not shoot eights". Román and Avitia meanwhile received a call from the President of Mexico congratulating them on achieving their nation's debut Olympic archery medals. Their double success was the first time since the 1984 Summer Olympics in Los Angeles that Mexican athletes had won two medals in the same discipline at the same Games, and the first time that it had been achieved by Mexican women.

== Records ==
- 70 metres - 72 arrow ranking round

	Archer	Score	Location	Date	Ref
World record	Park Sung-hyun (KOR)	682	Gwangju, South Korea	12 August 2004	
Olympic record	Lina Herasymenko (UKR)	673	Atlanta, United States	28 July 1996	

Both the Olympic record score of 673, set by Ukraine's Lina Herasymenko at the 1996 Summer Olympics and equalled by South Korea's Park Sung-hyun at the 2008 Summer Olympics, and the existing world record score of 682, set by Park one day before the 2004 Summer Olympics opening ceremony, remained intact at the conclusion of the event.

== Results ==
=== Ranking round ===
Rank	Archer	Half		Score	10s	Xs
Rank	Archer	1st	2nd	Score	10s	Xs
1	Ki Bo-Bae (KOR)	339	332	671	31	13
2	Lee Sung-Jin (KOR)	338	333	671	30	4
3	Tan Ya-ting (TPE)	337	334	671	28	8
4	Khatuna Lorig (USA)	331	338	669	32	4
5	Lin Chia-En (TPE)	338	329	667	33	8
6	Miki Kanie (JPN)	335	330	665	30	7
7	Carina Christiansen (DEN)	332	331	663	26	8
8	Deepika Kumari (IND)	327	335	662	25	8
9	Ksenia Perova (RUS)	329	330	659	28	7
10	Mariana Avitia (MEX)	334	325	659	20	8
11	Aída Román (MEX)	329	329	658	28	9
12	Ana Rendón (COL)	327	330	657	25	14
13	Alejandra Valencia (MEX)	324	333	657	24	4
14	Miranda Leek (USA)	331	325	656	24	8
15	Jennifer Nichols (USA)	328	326	654	27	7
16	Ren Hayakawa (JPN)	324	330	654	24	12
17	Inna Stepanova (RUS)	323	330	653	24	7
18	Urantungalag Bishindee (MGL)	333	319	652	25	10
19	Pia Carmen Lionetti (ITA)	328	324	652	24	8
20	Cheng Ming (CHN)	326	325	651	25	6
21	Choi Hyeon-Ju (KOR)	321	330	651	23	9
22	Bombayla Devi Laishram (IND)	327	324	651	20	4
23	Kristina Timofeeva (RUS)	325	325	650	30	8
24	Natalia Valeeva (ITA)	322	328	650	23	5
25	Fang Yuting (CHN)	326	323	649	20	5
26	Begül Löklüoğlu (TUR)	324	324	648	21	6
27	Xu Jing (CHN)	318	328	646	25	8
28	Kaori Kawanaka (JPN)	321	325	646	25	4
29	Marie-Pier Beaudet (CAN)	318	327	645	23	4
30	Elena Richter (GER)	321	324	645	22	4
31	Denisse van Lamoen (CHI)	321	324	645	18	5
32	Lidiia Sichenikova (UKR)	323	322	645	18	5
33	Yekaterina Mulyuk-Timofeyeva (BLR)	327	317	644	15	6
34	Kristine Esebua (GEO)	320	322	642	15	6
35	Maja Jager (DEN)	325	317	642	15	2
36	Louise Laursen (DEN)	310	331	641	24	6
37	Bérengère Schuh (FRA)	319	321	640	24	7
38	Natalia Leśniak (POL)	322	317	639	20	5
39	Le Chien-Ying (TPE)	317	321	638	15	4
40	Ika Yuliana Rochmawati (INA)	318	320	638	14	6
41	Kwon Un-Sil (PRK)	321	317	638	14	3
42	Naomi Folkard (GBR)	317	320	637	21	5
43	Evangelia Psarra (GRE)	323	313	636	21	8
44	Jessica Tomasi (ITA)	311	324	635	21	7
45	Leidys Brito (VEN)	317	317	634	17	3
46	Karen Hultzer (RSA)	319	312	631	16	5
47	Alison Williamson (GBR)	310	319	629	16	5
48	Rachelle Anne Cabral (PHI)	318	309	627	17	4
49	Christine Bjerendal (SWE)	311	314	625	20	5
50	Chekrovolu Swuro (IND)	309	316	625	19	9
51	Kateryna Palekha (UKR)	305	319	624	16	6
52	Reena Pärnat (EST)	304	317	621	21	5
53	Iria Grandal (ESP)	306	312	618	15	4
54	Anastassiya Bannova (KAZ)	309	305	614	15	2
55	Zahra Dehghan (IRI)	305	309	614	9	0
56	Nada Kamel (EGY)	314	297	611	12	3
57	Amy Oliver (GBR)	303	305	608	13	5
58	Elisa Barnard (AUS)	298	303	601	13	3
59	Tetyana Dorokhova (UKR)	295	304	599	10	4
60	Nurul Syafiqah Hashim (MAS)	302	297	599	9	3
61	Sherab Zam (BHU)	286	303	589	7	3
62	Nathalie Dielen (SUI)	254	274	528	8	1
63	Maureen Tuimalealiifano (SAM)	253	267	520	6	2
64	Rand Al-Mashhadani (IRQ)	250	248	498	9	1

=== Elimination rounds ===
==== Section 1 ====
1/32 eliminations
1	B-B Ki (KOR)	6	29	27	27
64	R Al-Mashhadani (IRQ)	0	18	19	17
32	L Sichenikova (UKR)	5^{9}	25	24	26	27	26
33	Y Timofeyeva (BLR)	6^{9+}	26	25	26	25	25
16	R Hayakawa (JPN)	6	30	26	26	27	29
49	C Bjerendal (SWE)	4	24	27	27	25	27
17	I Stepanova (RUS)	7	23	23	25	27
48	R Cabral (PHI)	1	22	18	25	22
8	D Kumari (IND)	2	26	26	26	26
57	A Oliver (GBR)	6	27	22	27	28
25	Y Fang (CHN)	4	27	27	29	23	24
40	I Rochmawati (INA)	6	27	27	23	27	28
9	K Perova (RUS)	6	25	28	26
56	N Kamel (EGY)	0	24	26	25
24	N Valeeva (ITA)	7	20	28	28	28	28
41	U-S Kwon (PRK)	3	26	25	28	27	24

1/16 eliminations
1	B-B Ki (KOR)	6	28	27	29	28
33	Y Timofeyeva (BLR)	2	23	28	26	27
16	R Hayakawa (JPN)	7	26	25	29	29	27
17	I Stepanova (RUS)	3	24	26	25	29	25
57	A Oliver (GBR)	1	24	23	28	28
40	I Rochmawati (INA)	7	28	28	28	30
9	K Perova (RUS)	6	27	29	24	28
24	N Valeeva (ITA)	2	24	27	28	25

1/8 eliminations
1	B-B Ki (KOR)	6	27	28	28
16	R Hayakawa (JPN)	0	26	26	26
40	I Rochmawati (INA)	5^{9}	26	27	25	27	24
9	K Perova (RUS)	6^{10}	23	27	23	28	28

Quarter-finals
1	B-B Ki (KOR)	6	27	29	26	28	27
9	K Perova (RUS)	4	27	28	27	24	27

==== Section 2 ====
1/32 eliminations
4	K Lorig (USA)	6	28	26	26
61	S Zam (BHU)	0	22	21	22
29	M-P Beaudet (CAN)	3	26	24	24	28	25
36	L Laursen (DEN)	7	26	25	26	25	26
13	A Valencia (MEX)	7	26	26	26	25
52	R Pärnat (EST)	1	21	26	25	18
20	M Cheng (CHN)	6	27	26	27	25	28
45	L Brito (VEN)	4	24	28	28	24	26
5	C-E Lin (TPE)	6	23	26	24	27
60	N Hashim (MAS)	2	28	19	18	24
28	K Kawanaka (JPN)	2	29	22	26	27
37	B Schuh (FRA)	6	21	27	28	30
12	A Rendón (COL)	2	25	27	25	27
53	I Grandal (ESP)	6	26	21	28	29
21	H-J Choi (KOR)	6^{10}	25	28	27	24	29
44	J Tomasi (ITA)	5^{9}	27	28	26	26	27

1/16 eliminations
4	K Lorig (USA)	6	27	22	24	29	27
36	L Laursen (DEN)	4	24	28	24	26	27
13	A Valencia (MEX)	1	25	25	27	24
20	M Cheng (CHN)	7	27	27	27	25
5	C-E Lin (TPE)	5^{9}	26	22	26	27	28
37	B Schuh (FRA)	6^{9+}	20	29	27	27	25
53	I Grandal (ESP)	5^{9}	24	28	26	24	28
21	H-J Choi (KOR)	6^{10}	27	28	28	20	27

1/8 eliminations
4	K Lorig (USA)	7	29	27	26	30	26
20	M Cheng (CHN)	3	26	27	28	28	25
37	B Schuh (FRA)	6^{9+}	26	28	29	27	22
21	H-J Choi (KOR)	5^{9}	25	28	26	28	27

Quarter-finals
4	K Lorig (USA)	6	27	25	26	25
37	B Schuh (FRA)	2	25	26	19	24

==== Section 3 ====
1/32 eliminations
3	Y-T Tan (TPE)	6	26	26	25	24	29
62	N Dielen (SUI)	4	26	25	25	27	26
30	E Richter (GER)	6^{9}	21	25	28	26	26
35	M Jager (DEN)	5^{8}	26	29	27	24	26
19	P Lionetti (ITA)	6	27	21	27	24
46	K Hultzer (RSA)	2	21	19	28	15
14	M Leek (USA)	6	29	29	28	27
51	K Palekha (UKR)	2	26	24	28	27
6	M Kanie (JPN)	7	25	27	27	26
59	T Dorokhova (UKR)	1	24	27	25	21
27	J Xu (CHN)	6	29	28	25	26
38	N Leśniak (POL)	2	28	25	27	18
22	B Devi (IND)	6	25	28	28	23	25
43	E Psarra (GRE)	4	27	24	26	23	25
11	A Román (MEX)	6	27	25	23	27
54	A Bannova (KAZ)	2	23	24	26	25

1/16 eliminations
3	Y-T Tan (TPE)	6	27	28	25	27
30	E Richter (GER)	2	26	27	27	26
19	P Lionetti (ITA)	6	27	27	28	26	28
14	M Leek (USA)	4	26	28	28	26	26
6	M Kanie (JPN)	6	29	28	28
27	J Xu (CHN)	0	24	25	24
22	B Devi (IND)	2	24	25	24	20
11	A Román (MEX)	6	30	24	26	27

1/8 eliminations
3	Y-T Tan (TPE)	2	25	26	28	22
19	P Lionetti (ITA)	6	28	24	30	23
6	M Kanie (JPN)	3	28	27	23	25	26
11	A Román (MEX)	7	28	24	25	27	27

Quarter-finals
19	P Lionetti (ITA)	2	28	24	27	23
11	A Román (MEX)	6	27	26	30	26

==== Section 4 ====
1/32 eliminations
7	C Christiansen (DEN)	7	24	24	24	25	27
58	E Barnard (AUS)	3	25	21	24	23	21
26	B Löklüoğlu (TUR)	0	26	23	29
39	C-Y Le (TPE)	6	28	26	30
23	K Timofeeva (RUS)	4	27	25	30	22	24
42	N Folkard (GBR)	6	24	26	26	28	26
10	M Avitia (MEX)	6	28	26	27	27
55	Z Dehghan (IRI)	2	28	20	27	24
15	J Nichols (USA)	6^{9+}	24	27	25	26	28
50	C Swuro (IND)	5^{9}	27	25	25	29	25
18	U Bishindee (MGL)	7	25	27	27	28	27
47	A Williamson (GBR)	3	27	27	25	25	26
31	D Lamoen (CHI)	0	22	26	25
34	K Esebua (GEO)	6	28	28	26
2	S-J Lee (KOR)	6	29	29	27
63	M Tuimalealiifano (SAM)	0	18	25	25

1/16 eliminations
7	C Christiansen (DEN)	6	26	28	26	29	27
39	C-Y Le (TPE)	4	26	27	28	29	24
42	N Folkard (GBR)	2	28	27	26	26
10	M Avitia (MEX)	6	28	29	27	26
15	J Nichols (USA)	4	27	27	26	25	25
18	U Bishindee (MGL)	6	27	26	26	26	28
34	K Esebua (GEO)	2	25	25	28	27
2	S-J Lee (KOR)	6	26	29	27	28

1/8 eliminations
7	C Christiansen (DEN)	2	16	28	24	23
10	M Avitia (MEX)	6	25	26	29	29
18	U Bishindee (MGL)	0	25	25	26
2	S-J Lee (KOR)	6	29	26	28

Quarter-finals
10	M Avitia (MEX)	6	26	27	30	29
2	S-J Lee (KOR)	2	29	25	29	28

Note: A superscript denotes a win from a one-arrow shoot-off

=== Finals ===
Semi-finals
1	Ki Bo-Bae (KOR)	6	28	29	23	27
4	Khatuna Lorig (USA)	2	28	28	23	26
11	Aída Román (MEX)	6	25	27	25	27
10	Mariana Avitia (MEX)	2	21	27	25	24

Finals
1	Ki Bo-Bae (KOR) (gold)	6^{8+}	27	26	26	30	26
11	Aída Román (MEX) (silver)	5^{8}	25	26	29	22	27
Third place
4	Khatuna Lorig (USA)	2	27	22	25	24
10	Mariana Avitia (MEX) (bronze)	6	30	24	24	26

Note: A superscript denotes a win from a one-arrow shoot-off
