= Grandal =

Grandal is a surname. Notable people with the surname include:

- Iria Grandal (born 1990), Spanish archer
- Yasmani Grandal (born 1988), Cuban-American baseball player
