= Iria Grandal =

Spanish archer (born 1990)

Personal information
- Born: 13 August 1990 (age 35) A Coruña, Spain

Sport
- Country: Spain
- Sport: Archery
- Event: Recurve

Iria Grandal (born 13 August 1990 in A Coruña, Spain) is a Spanish archer who competed at the 2012 Summer Olympics.

Grandal took up archery aged seven and at age fourteen finished third in Spain's junior archery championship. In 2012 she won qualification to that year's Olympic Games, an outcome that by her own admission was a surprise.

Grandal entered as only one of two Spaniards competing in the Olympic archery competitions in London. She finished the preliminary 72-arrow ranking round of the women's individual event with 618 points from a maximum of 720, earning the 53rd seed for the subsequent elimination rounds. Grandal defeated the twelfth seed Ana Rendón of Colombia in the first round and narrowly lost in the second round to South Korea's Choi Hyeon-ju, taking the women's team gold medalist to a tie-breaking one-arrow shoot-off.

Grandal is the daughter of two archers and as of 2012 was a student of journalism.
