= Archery at the 2012 Summer Olympics – Women's team =

Women's team at the Games of the XXX Olympiad
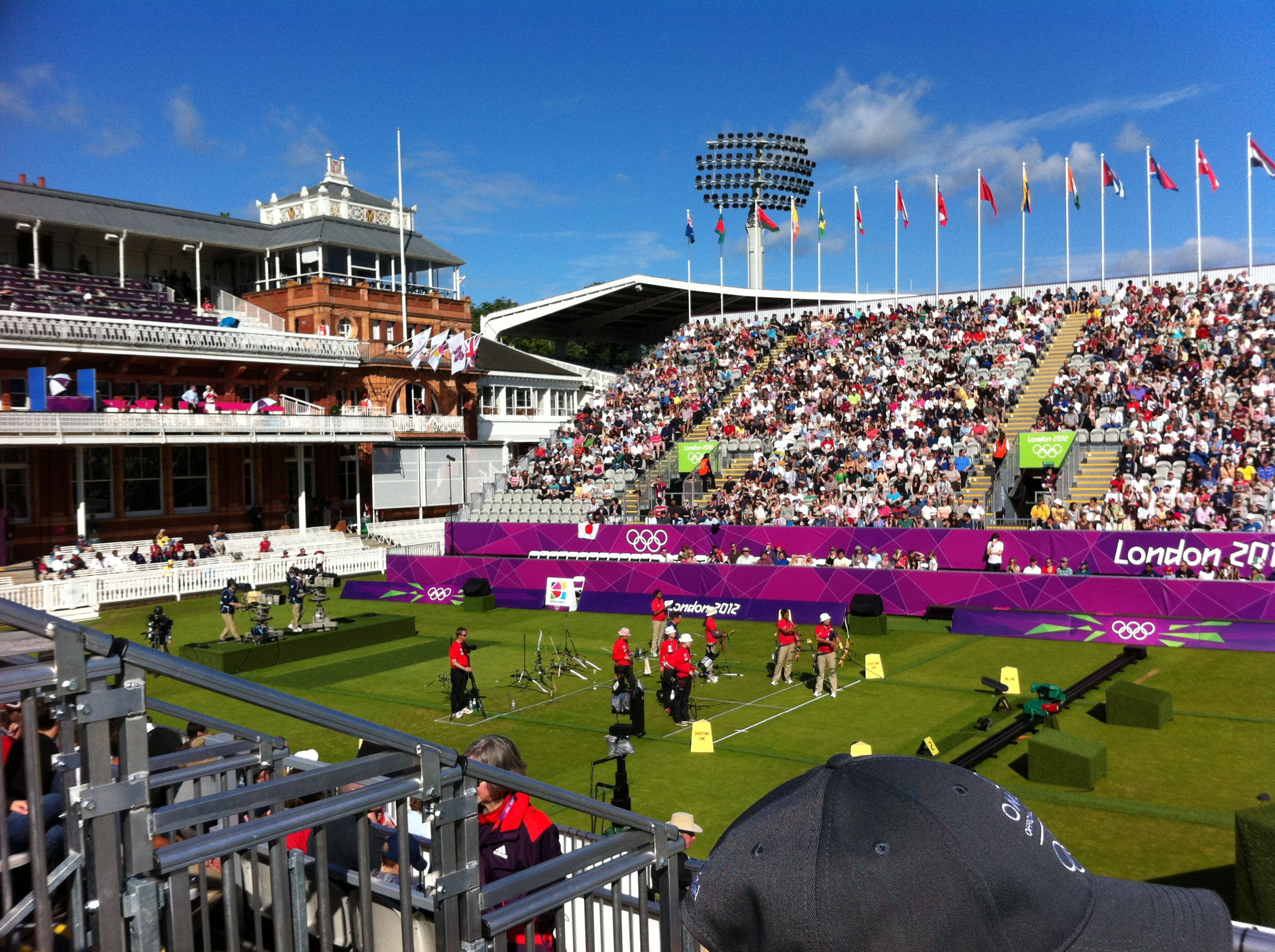
- View of Lord's Cricket Ground during a first round match between Denmark and India
- Venue: Lord's Cricket Ground
- Dates: 27–29 July 2012
- Competitors: 36 from 12 nations

Medalists
1st place, gold medalist(s)		Lee Sung-Jin; Ki Bo-Bae; Choi Hyeonju	South Korea
2nd place, silver medalist(s)		Fang Yuting; Cheng Ming; Xu Jing	China
3rd place, bronze medalist(s)		Kaori Kawanaka; Ren Hayakawa; Miki Kanie	Japan

The women's team archery competition at the 2012 Olympic Games in London was held from 27 to 29 July at Lord's Cricket Ground. The women's team event was one of four events which comprised the 2012 Olympic archery programme.

The gold medal was won by South Korea. This was the third consecutive Olympics that China lost to South Korea in the final. Japan won the bronze medal over Russia.

== Competition format ==
The teams were ranked 1st to 12th based on the three team members' ranking round results and this was used to seed the teams into a head-to-head knockout bracket. Each member of the team shot eight arrows in a match (for a total of 24 arrows per team) and the team with the highest total won the match. The winner advanced to the next round while the loser was eliminated from the competition.

== Schedule ==
All times are British Summer Time (UTC+1).

Date	Time	Round
Friday, 27 July 2012	13:00–15:00	Ranking round
Sunday, 29 July 2012	09:00–10:40	Round of 16
Sunday, 29 July 2012	15:00–16:40	Quarter-finals
Sunday, 29 July 2012	16:40–17:30	Semi-finals
Sunday, 29 July 2012	17:31–18:26	Final

== Records ==
Prior to this competition, the existing world and Olympic records were as follows.

- 216 arrow ranking round

World record	South Korea; Park Sung-hyun, Lee Sung-Jin, Yun Mi-Jin	2030	Athens, Greece	12 August 2004
Olympic record	South Korea; Park Sung-hyun, Yun Ok-Hee, Joo Hyun-Jung	2004	Beijing, China	9 August 2008

- 24 arrow match

World record	South Korea; Park Sung-hyun, Yun Ok-Hee, Joo Hyun-Jung	231	Beijing, China	10 August 2008
Olympic record	South Korea; Park Sung-hyun, Yun Ok-Hee, Joo Hyun-Jung	231	Beijing, China	10 August 2008

== Results ==
=== Ranking round ===
Rank	Nation	Archer	Score	10s	Xs
1	South Korea	Lee Sung-Jin; Ki Bo-Bae; Choi Hyeon-Ju	1993	84	26
2	United States	Miranda Leek; Khatuna Lorig; Jennifer Nichols	1979	83	19
3	Chinese Taipei	Le Chien-Ying; Lin Chia-En; Tan Ya-Ting	1976	76	20
4	Mexico	Mariana Avitia; Aída Román; Alejandra Valencia	1974	72	21
5	Japan	Kaori Kawanaka; Ren Hayakawa; Miki Kanie	1965	79	23
6	Russia	Ksenia Perova; Kristina Timofeeva; Inna Stepanova	1962	82	22
7	China	Fang Yuting; Cheng Ming; Xu Jing	1946	70	19
8	Denmark	Louise Laursen; Maja Jager; Carina Christiansen	1946	65	16
9	India	Bombayala Devi; Deepika Kumari; Chekrovolu Swuro	1938	64	21
10	Italy	Pia Carmen Lionetti; Natalia Valeeva; Jessica Tomasi	1937	68	20
11	Great Britain	Naomi Folkard; Amy Oliver; Alison Williamson	1874	50	15
12	Ukraine	Tetyana Dorokhova; Kateryna Palekha; Lidiia Sichenikova	1868	44	15

=== Competition bracket ===
First round
8	Denmark	211
9	India	210
5	Japan	207
12	Ukraine	192
11	Great Britain	208
6	Russia	215
7	China	200
10	Italy	199

Quarter-finals
1	South Korea	206
8	Denmark	195
5	Japan	219
4	Mexico	209
3	Chinese Taipei	216^{26}
6	Russia	216^{28}
7	China	218
2	United States	213

Semi-finals
1	South Korea	221
5	Japan	206
6	Russia	207
7	China	208

Final
1	South Korea	210
7	China	209
Third place
5	Japan	209
6	Russia	207
