= Samoa at the 2012 Summer Olympics =

- IOC code: SAM
- NOC: Samoa Association of Sports and National Olympic Committee Inc.
- Website: www.oceaniasport.com/samoa

in London
- Competitors: 8 in 6 sports
- Flag bearers: Ele Opeloge (opening); Kaino Thomsen (closing)
- Medals: Gold 0 Silver 0 Bronze 0 Total 0

Summer Olympics appearances (overview)
- 1984; 1988; 1992; 1996; 2000; 2004; 2008; 2012; 2016; 2020; 2024; 2028

Samoa competed at the 2012 Summer Olympics in London, from 27 July to 12 August 2012. This was the nation's eighth appearance at the Olympics, although four other games were first appeared under the name Western Samoa.

Samoa Association of Sports and National Olympic Committee Inc. (SASNOC) sent the nation's second-largest delegation to the Games, tying its record for the number of athletes with Los Angeles. A total of 8 athletes, 5 men and 3 women, competed in 6 sports. Two athletes made their second consecutive Olympic appearance, including sprint kayaker Rudolph Berking-Williams. Weightlifter Ele Opeloge, who was considered Samoa's best medal prospect after finishing fourth in Beijing, reprised her role as the nation's flag bearer at the opening ceremony. Among the sports played by the athletes, Samoa marked its Olympic debut in taekwondo. Samoa, however, has yet to win its first ever Olympic medal.

== Archery ==
Samoa has qualified one archer; Maureen Tuimalealiifano is competing in the women's individual event.

| Athlete | Event | Ranking round | | Round of 64 | Round of 32 | Round of 16 | Quarterfinals | Semifinals | Final / BM | |
| Athlete | Event | Score | Seed | Opposition Score | Opposition Score | Opposition Score | Opposition Score | Opposition Score | Opposition Score | Rank |
|---|---|---|---|---|---|---|---|---|---|---|
| Maureen Tuimalealiifano | Women's individual | 520 | 63 | Lee S-j (KOR) (2); L 0–6 | did not advance | | | | | |

== Athletics ==
Men

| Athlete | Event | Qualification | | Final | |
| Athlete | Event | Distance | Position | Distance | Position |
|---|---|---|---|---|---|
| Emanuele Fuamatu | Shot put | 17.78 | 35 | did not advance | |

Key

- Note–Ranks given for track events are within the athlete's heat only
- Q = Qualified for the next round
- q = Qualified for the next round as a fastest loser or, in field events, by position without achieving the qualifying target
- NR = National record
- N/A = Round not applicable for the event
- Bye = Athlete not required to compete in round

== Canoeing ==
=== Sprint ===
| Athlete | Event | Heats | | Semifinals | | Final | |
| Athlete | Event | Time | Rank | Time | Rank | Time | Rank |
|---|---|---|---|---|---|---|---|
| Rudolph Berking-Williams | Men's C-1 200 m | 51.483 | 6 Q | 54.471 | 8 | did not advance | |
| Rudolph Berking-Williams | Men's C-1 1000 m | 4:54.211 | 6 | did not advance | | | |

Qualification Legend: FA = Qualify to final (medal); FB = Qualify to final B (non-medal)

== Judo ==
Samoa has qualified 1 judoka

| Athlete | Event | Round of 64 | Round of 32 | Round of 16 | Quarterfinals | Semifinals | Repechage | Final / BM | |
| Athlete | Event | Opposition Result | Opposition Result | Opposition Result | Opposition Result | Opposition Result | Opposition Result | Opposition Result | Rank |
|---|---|---|---|---|---|---|---|---|---|
| Aleni Smith | Men's −73 kg | Bye | Ježek (CZE); L 0000–0100 | did not advance | | | | | |

== Taekwondo ==
Samoa has qualified two quota places in Taekwondo.

| Athlete | Event | Round of 16 | Quarterfinals | Semifinals | Repechage | Bronze Medal | Final | |
| Athlete | Event | Opposition Result | Opposition Result | Opposition Result | Opposition Result | Opposition Result | Opposition Result | Rank |
|---|---|---|---|---|---|---|---|---|
| Kaino Thomsen-Fuataga | Men's +80 kg | Obame (GAB); L 2–9 | did not advance | | Despaigne (CUB); L 2–14 | did not advance | | |
| Talitiga Crawley | Women's +67 kg | Mandić (SRB); L 2–16 | did not advance | | Espinoza (MEX); L 0–13 | did not advance | | |

== Weightlifting ==
Samoa has qualified the following quota places.

| Athlete | Event | Snatch | | Clean & Jerk | | Total | Rank |
| Athlete | Event | Result | Rank | Result | Rank | Total | Rank |
|---|---|---|---|---|---|---|---|
| Toafitu Perive | Men's −77 kg | 122 | 12 | 167 | 11 | 289 | 11 |
| Ele Opeloge | Women's +75 kg | 117 | 9 | 150 | 6 | 267 | 6 |

== See also ==
- Samoa at the 2012 Summer Paralympics
