= Choi Hyeon-ju =

South Korean archer (born 1984)

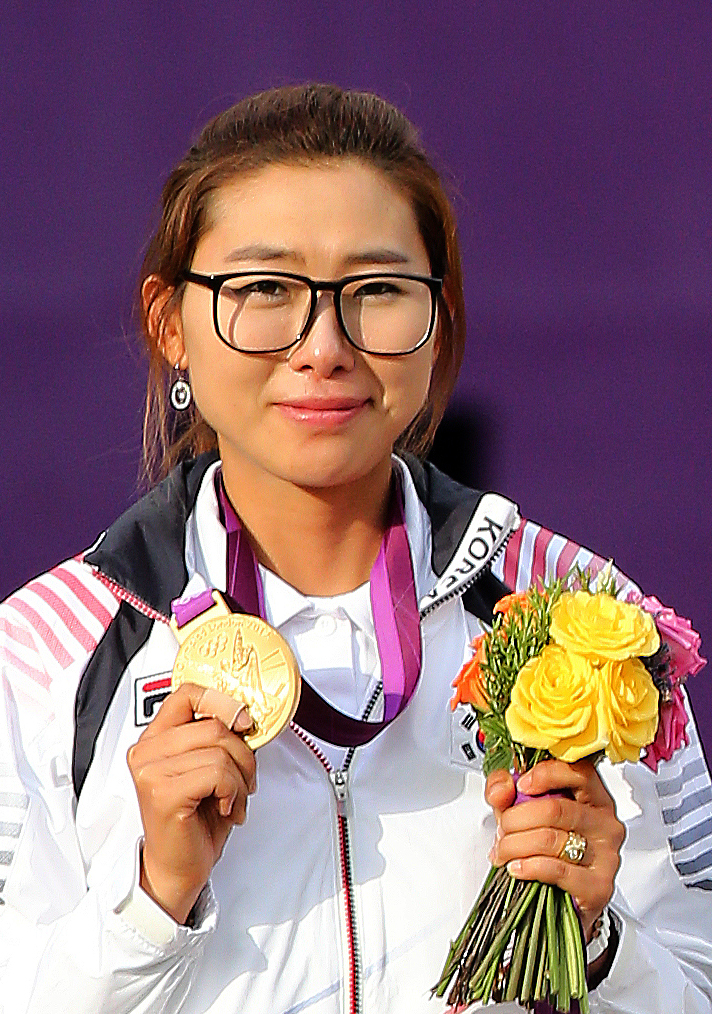
- Choi at the 2012 Summer Olympics

Personal information
- Born: 6 August 1984 (age 42)

Sport
- Country: South Korea
- Sport: Archery
- Event: Recurve
Medal record
Women's archery
Representing South Korea
Olympic Games
Gold medal – first place	2012 London	Team
World Cup Final
Bronze medal – third place	2012 Tokyo	Individual

Korean name
- Hangul: 최현주
- RR: Choe Hyeonju
- MR: Ch'oe Hyŏnju

Choi Hyeon-ju (Korean: 최현주, Korean pronunciation: [tɕʰwe̞.ɦjʌn.dʑu]; born 6 August 1984, in Jeonbuk) is a South Korean archer. She competed at the 2012 Summer Olympics where she won gold medal in the women's team event.

== Career ==
2012 Summer Olympics

Choi made her Olympic debut at the 2012 London Games as part of the South Korean women's archery team alongside Ki Bo-bae and Lee Sung-jin. The trio collectively finished top of the team standings in the 72-arrow ranking round, which determined the seedings for the subsequent elimination rounds, with Ki and Lee heading the results for the individual event. Choi however struggled with nerves in her first Olympic competition and concluded the round twenty points adrift of her teammates, scoring 651 points from a maximum of 720 and finishing in a distant 21st place.

South Korea were the overwhelming favourites to win the women's team event, and the trio comfortably defeated Denmark and Japan to reach the final against China. After a slow start – in which Choi shot the team's highest score of eight in the first set of arrows – they recovered to win South Korea's seventh successive Olympic gold medal in the discipline. Choi's medal came despite competing with shoulder pain, which she blamed for her form.

Choi reached the last sixteen in the women's individual event, losing in a one arrow shoot-off to France's Berengère Schuh after tying on set points.

== See also ==
- Korean archery
- List of South Korean archers
