= Carina Rosenvinge Christiansen =

Danish archer (born 1991)

Carina Christiansen
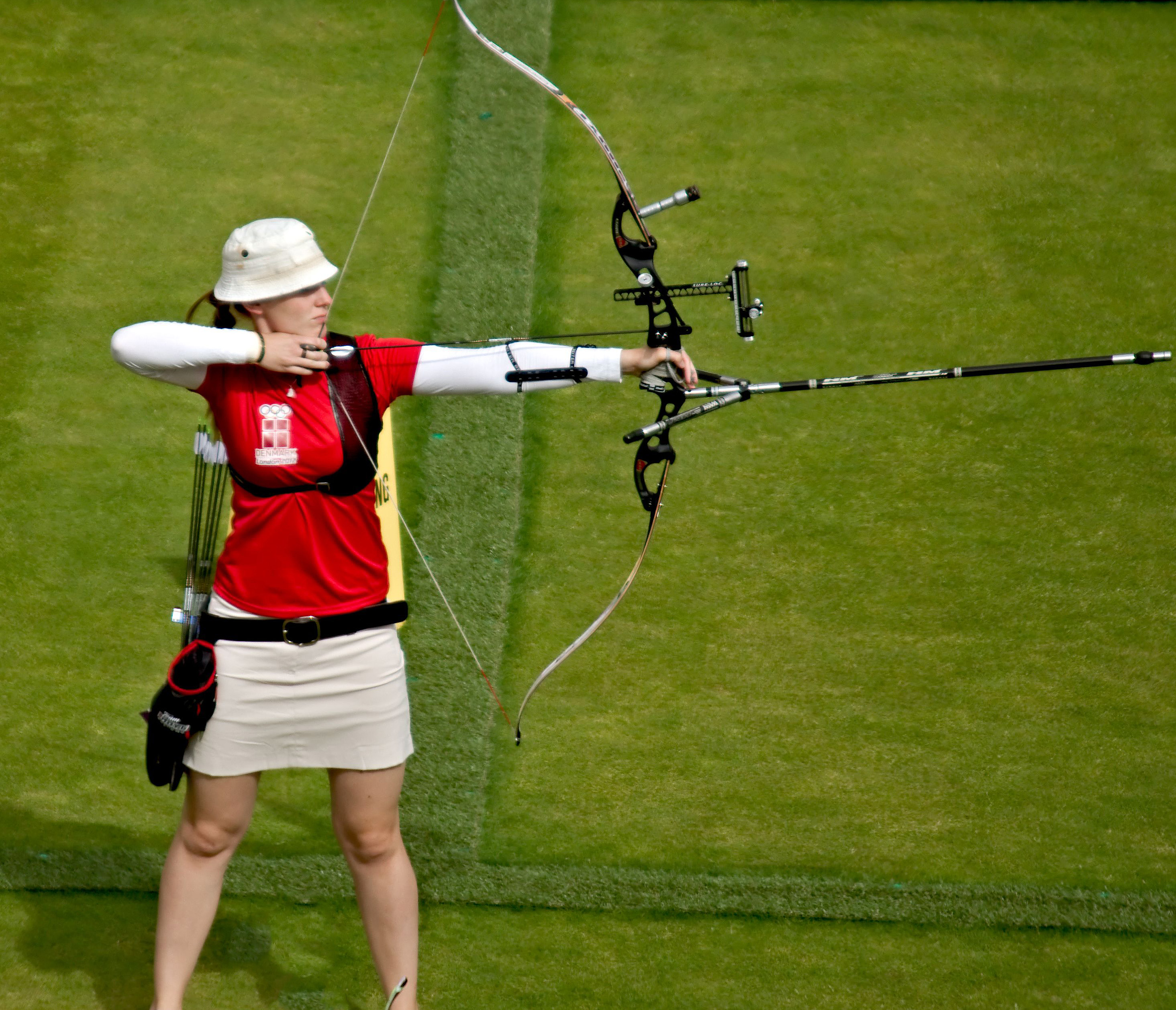
- Christiansen at the 2012 Summer Olympics

Personal information
- Full name: Carina Rosenvinge Christiansen
- Nationality: Danish
- Born: 17 March 1991 (age 35) Aalborg, Denmark
- Height: 171 cm (5 ft 7 in)

Sport
- Sport: Archery
- Event: Recurve
Medal record
Women's Archery
Representing Denmark
World Championships
Bronze medal – third place	2013 Belek	Team

Carina Rosenvinge Christiansen (born 17 March 1991) is a Danish recurve archer who competed at the 2012 Summer Olympics.

== Early and personal life ==
Christiansen was born on 17 March 1991 in Aalborg. She was introduced to archery at the age of eleven in 2002, joining the Aarhus Archer's Guild (Aarhus Bueskyttelaug), the club with which she has remained as of 2015. In 2012 she listed tennis player Caroline Wozniacki as her sporting idol.

== Career ==
=== 2012 Summer Olympics ===
Christiansen made her Olympic debut at the 2012 Summer Olympics in London, joining teammates Maja Jager and Louise Laursen for Denmark's first appearance in the women's team event, as well as competing in the women's individual event. The preliminary ranking round, which determined the seedings for the subsequent elimination rounds, saw Christiansen rank seventh for the individual competition with 663 points from a maximum of 720, while Christiansen, Jager, and Laursen's combined score for the team event set a new Danish national record of 1,946 points to finish with the eighth seed. The trio defeated India in the first knock-out round to advance to the quarter-finals, where they were defeated by South Korea.

In the women's individual event Christiansen progressed the furthest of her teammates, reaching to the last sixteen before being eliminated by Mexico's Mariana Avitia.
