= 2011 Asian Archery Championships =

International archery tournament

- Host city: Tehran, Iran
- Dates: 20–24 October 2011

The 2011 Asian Archery Championships was the 17th edition of the event. It was held at the Azadi Sport Complex in Tehran, Iran from 20 to 24 October 2011 and was organized by Asian Archery Federation.

== Medal summary ==
=== Recurve ===
Event	Gold	Silver	Bronze
Men's individual	Khairul Anuar Mohamad; Malaysia	Hideki Kikuchi; Japan	Hsieh Chung-hao; Chinese Taipei
Men's team	Malaysia; Cheng Chu Sian; Haziq Kamaruddin; Khairul Anuar Mohamad	China; Jing Xiangqing; Li Wenquan; Liu Zhaowu	Kazakhstan; Artyom Gankin; Denis Gankin; Oibek Saidiyev
Women's individual	Yang Nien-hsiu; Chinese Taipei	Zahra Dehghan; Iran	Ren Hayakawa; Japan
Women's team	Japan; Nami Hayakawa; Ren Hayakawa; Kaori Kawanaka	Mongolia; Chuluunbaataryn Mönkhtsetseg; Chuluuny Oyunsüren; Bishindeegiin Urantungalag	India; Deepika Kumari; Bombayla Devi Laishram; Chekrovolu Swuro
Mixed team	Kazakhstan; Denis Gankin; Anastassiya Bannova	Japan; Hiroki Suetake; Ren Hayakawa	China; Jing Xiangqing; Zhao Linli

=== Compound ===
Event	Gold	Silver	Bronze
Men's individual	Reza Zamaninejad; Iran	Zaki Mahazan; Malaysia	Min Li-hong; South Korea
Men's team	Iran; Majid Gheidi; Amir Kazempour; Reza Zamaninejad	South Korea; Choi Yong-hee; Kim Hyung-il; Min Li-hong	Kazakhstan; Pavel Fisher; Akbarali Karabayev; Artyom Kichkin
Women's individual	Maryam Ranjbar; Iran	Lee Hyun-jeong; South Korea	Kwon Oh-hyang; South Korea
Women's team	South Korea; Kwon Oh-hyang; Lee Hyun-jeong; Seo Jung-hee	Malaysia; Saritha Cham Nong; Nor Rizah Ishak; Fatin Nurfatehah	India; Jhano Hansdah; Manjudha Soy; Jyothi Surekha
Mixed team	South Korea; Min Li-hong; Lee Hyun-jeong	Iran; Reza Zamaninejad; Shabnam Sarlak	Thailand; Jitti Kaenthonglang; Sunee Detchokul

== Medal table ==
Rank	Nation	Gold	Silver	Bronze	Total
1	Iran	3	2	0	5
2	South Korea	2	2	2	6
3	Malaysia	2	2	0	4
4	Japan	1	2	1	4
5	Kazakhstan	1	0	2	3
6	Chinese Taipei	1	0	1	2
7	China	0	1	1	2
8	Mongolia	0	1	0	1
9	India	0	0	2	2
10	Thailand	0	0	1	1
Totals (10 entries)		10	10	10	30
