= Karen Hultzer =

South African archer (born 1965)

Karen Hultzer (born 16 September 1965 in Cape Town, South Africa) is a South African archer.

She competed in the individual event at the 2012 Summer Olympics. During that event, she came out as lesbian. She said "I am an archer, middle aged and a lesbian. I am also cranky before my first cup of coffee. None of these aspects define who I am, they are simply part of me."
