= Maureen Tuimalealiifano =

Samoan archer (born 1970)

Personal information
- Born: 17 October 1970 (age 54)
- Height: 1.75 m (5 ft 9 in)
- Weight: 70 kg (150 lb)

Sport
- Country: Samoa
- Sport: Archery
- Event: Individual
- Updated on 5 August 2012

Maureen Tuimalealiifano (born 17 October 1970 in Saleimoa, Samoa) is a Samoan archer. She competed in the individual event at the 2012 Summer Olympics and was eliminated in the Round of 64 after she lost 0–6 to South Korea's Lee Sung-jin. Starting the sport 8 months before the Olympics while she was manager at the Samoan Bank, she made rapid progress with the help (for 1 month) of a Chinese coach. Tuimalealiifano, is looking forward to getting sponsorship and competing at Rio 2016.
