= Miki Kanie =

Japanese archer (born 1988)

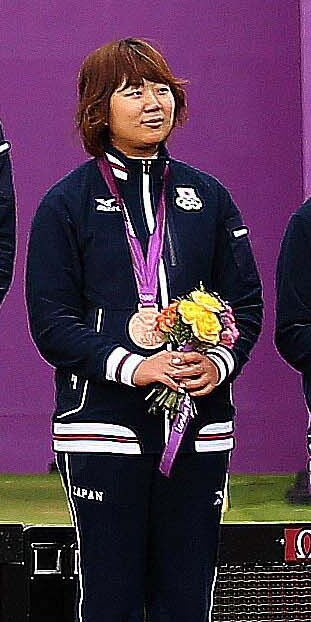
- Miki Kanie

Personal information
- Born: December 4, 1988 (age 37) Gifu Prefecture, Japan
Medal record
Women's recurve archery
Representing Japan
Olympic Games
| Bronze medal – third place | 2012 London | Team |
World Championships
| Silver medal – second place | 2009 Ulsan | Team |
Asian Championships
| Gold medal – first place | 2009 Denpasar | Team |
World Cup Final
| Silver medal – second place | 2012 Tokyo | Mixed Team |

Miki Kanie (蟹江 美貴, Kanie Miki; born December 4, 1988) is a Japanese archer who competed at the 2012 Summer Olympics. She entered the Olympics with a world ranking of 332 but finished the preliminary ranking round for the women's individual event in sixth place. She was later eliminated in the third round of the competition by Mexico's Aída Román. In the women's team event Kanie and teammates Ren Hayakawa and Kaori Kawanaka won bronze medal after defeating Russia in the third-place match, earning Japan's first Olympic archery medal in a team event.
