= Rand Saad =

Iraqi archer (born 1994)

Personal information
- Full name: Rand Saad Al-Mashhadani
- Nationality: (Iraq) Iraqi
- Born: August 11, 1994 (age 31) Baghdad, Iraq
- Height: 1.60 m (5 ft 3 in)
- Weight: 50 kg (110 lb)

Sport
- Country: Iraq
- Sport: Archery
- Event: Women's individual
- Club: Police club, Iraq
- Coached by: Mohammed Ali [national], Hanan Jasim [club]

Achievements and titles
- Olympic finals: London 2012 (R1)

Rand Saad Al-Mashhadani (born 11 August 1994) is an Iraqi archer. She competed in the individual event at the 2012 Summer Olympics.
