= Yekaterina Mulyuk-Timofeyeva =

Belarusian archer (born 1976)

Personal information
- Born: 13 November 1976 (age 49) Mazyr, Belarus
- Height: 1.62 m (5 ft 4 in)
- Weight: 53 kg (117 lb)

Sport
- Sport: Archery
- Club: Army Sports Club / Trade Union Sports Club Minsk/Gomel
Medal record
Representing Belarus
World Championships
Silver medal – second place	2013 Belek	Team

Yekaterina Nikolayevna Mulyuk-Timofeyeva or Katsiaryna Mikalayeuna Muliuk (Belarusian: Кацярына Мікалаеўна Мулюк; Russian: Екатерина Николаевна Мулюк-Тимофеева; born 13 November 1976) is a Belarusian archer. She competed in the individual event at the 2008 and 2012 Summer Olympics and finished in 23rd and 17th place, respectively. She won a silver team medal at the 2013 World Archery Championships.

At the 2008 Games she competed as Katsiaryna Muliuk. By the next Olympics she got married, gave birth and changed her name. She graduated from the Mozyr State Pedagogical University in Belarus with a degree in pedagogy in physical education.
