= Ren Hayakawa =

Japanese archer (born 1987)

Medal record

Women's recurve archery

Representing Japan

Olympic Games
Bronze medal – third place	2012 London	Team

Asian Games
Bronze medal – third place	2014 Incheon	Team

Asian Championships
Gold medal – first place	2011 Tehran	Team
Silver medal – second place	2011 Tehran	Mixed team
Bronze medal – third place	2011 Tehran	Individual

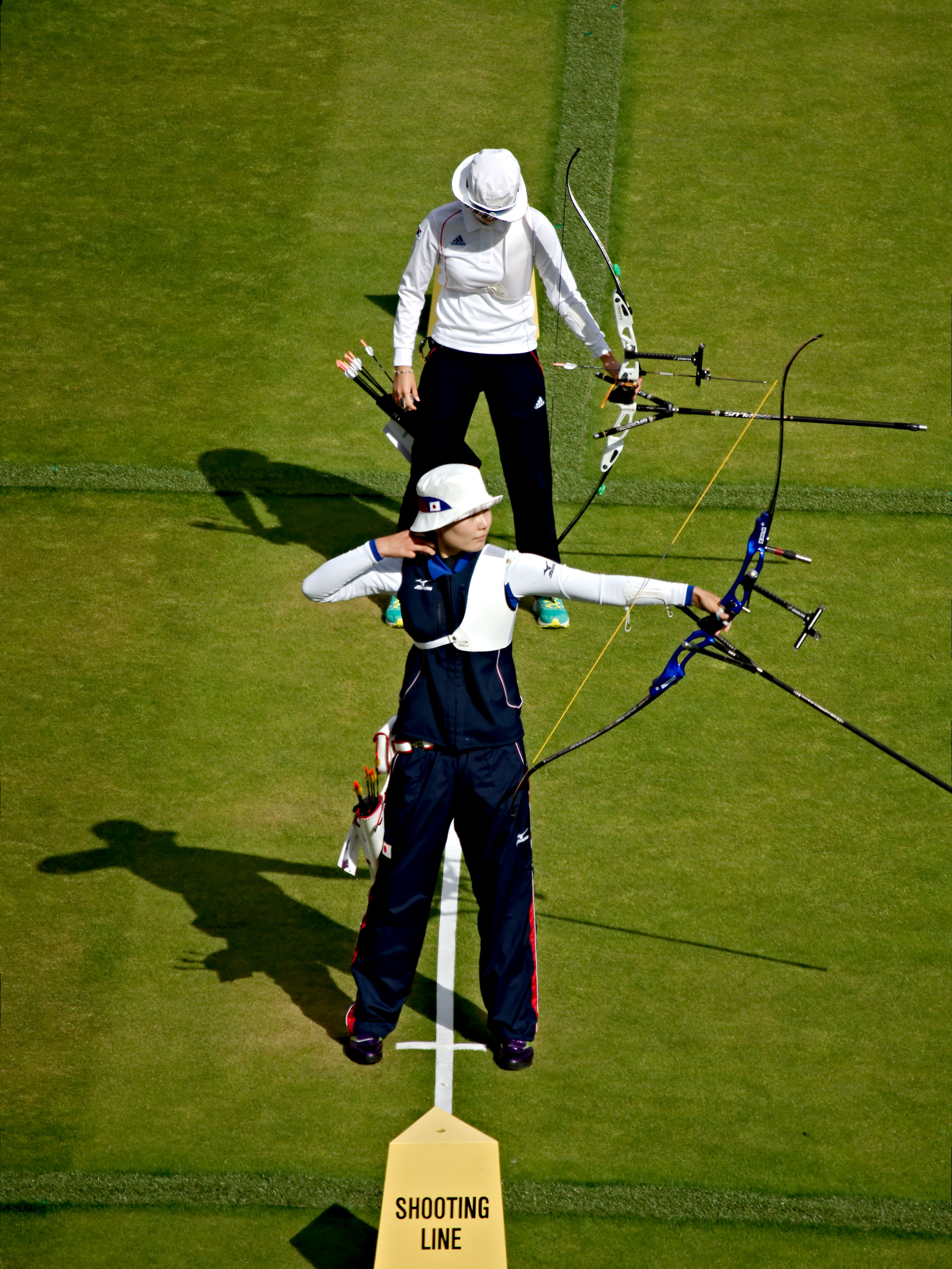
Ren Hayakawa (foreground) in 2012

Ren Hayakawa (早川 漣, Hayakawa Ren; born 24 August 1987) is a Japanese archer of South Korean descent who won a bronze medal in the women's team event at the 2012 Summer Olympics.

== Early and personal life ==
Hayakawa was born Um Hye-ryeon (hanja:嚴 惠漣) in Anyang, Gyeonggi Province in South Korea. She competed in archery in high school and was later a member of a professional team, though she never qualified for the South Korean national team. Hayakawa became a Japanese citizen in 2007 having left South Korea to study on an archery scholarship, enrolling at the Nippon Sport Science University.

Ren has an older sister, Nami who is also an Olympic archer and competed in the 2008 Summer Olympics

== Career ==
In 2011 Hayakawa was selected to be a member of the Japanese Olympic squad for the 2012 Summer Olympics in London. She became the second person in her family to compete at the Olympics after her sister Nami Hayakawa, who had previously competed for Japan in archery at the 2008 Summer Olympics. In London, Hayakawa and teammates Kaori Kawanaka and Miki Kanie advanced to the bronze medal match of the women's team event, where they defeated Russia by two points to earn Japan's first Olympic medal in team archery. She also competed in the women's individual event, losing in the third round to South Korea's Ki Bo-bae.

Hayakawa later won bronze in the women's team recurve competition at the 2014 Asian Games alongside Kawanaka and Yuki Hayashi.

Hayakawa was the face of Adidas by Stella McCartney's Spring Summer 2021 Campaign directed by Japanese photographer, Monika Mogi.
