= Fang Yuting =

Chinese archer (born 1989)

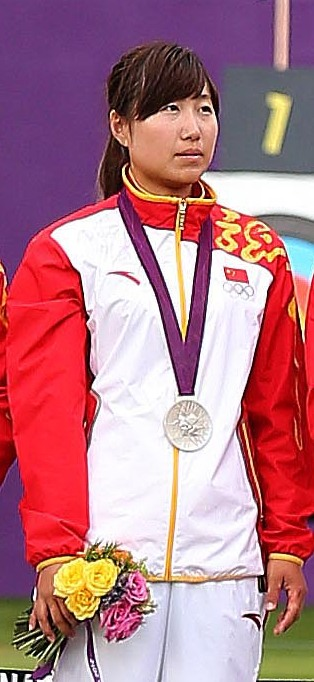
- Fang Yuting in 2012

Personal information
- Born: 21 December 1989 (age 36)
Medal record
Women's archery
Representing China
Olympic Games
| Silver medal – second place | 2012 London | Team |

Fang Yuting (Chinese: 方玉婷; pinyin: Fāng Yùtíng; born 21 December 1989) is a Chinese archer. At the 2012 Summer Olympics she competed for her country in the women's team event, winning a silver medal. China beat Italy by one point in the first round, then the US, followed by Russia, again by one point, before losing to South Korea by one point in the final. In the individual event, she lost in the first elimination round to Ika Rochmawati.

== See also ==
- China at the 2012 Summer Olympics
