= Bérengère Schuh =

French archer (born 1984)

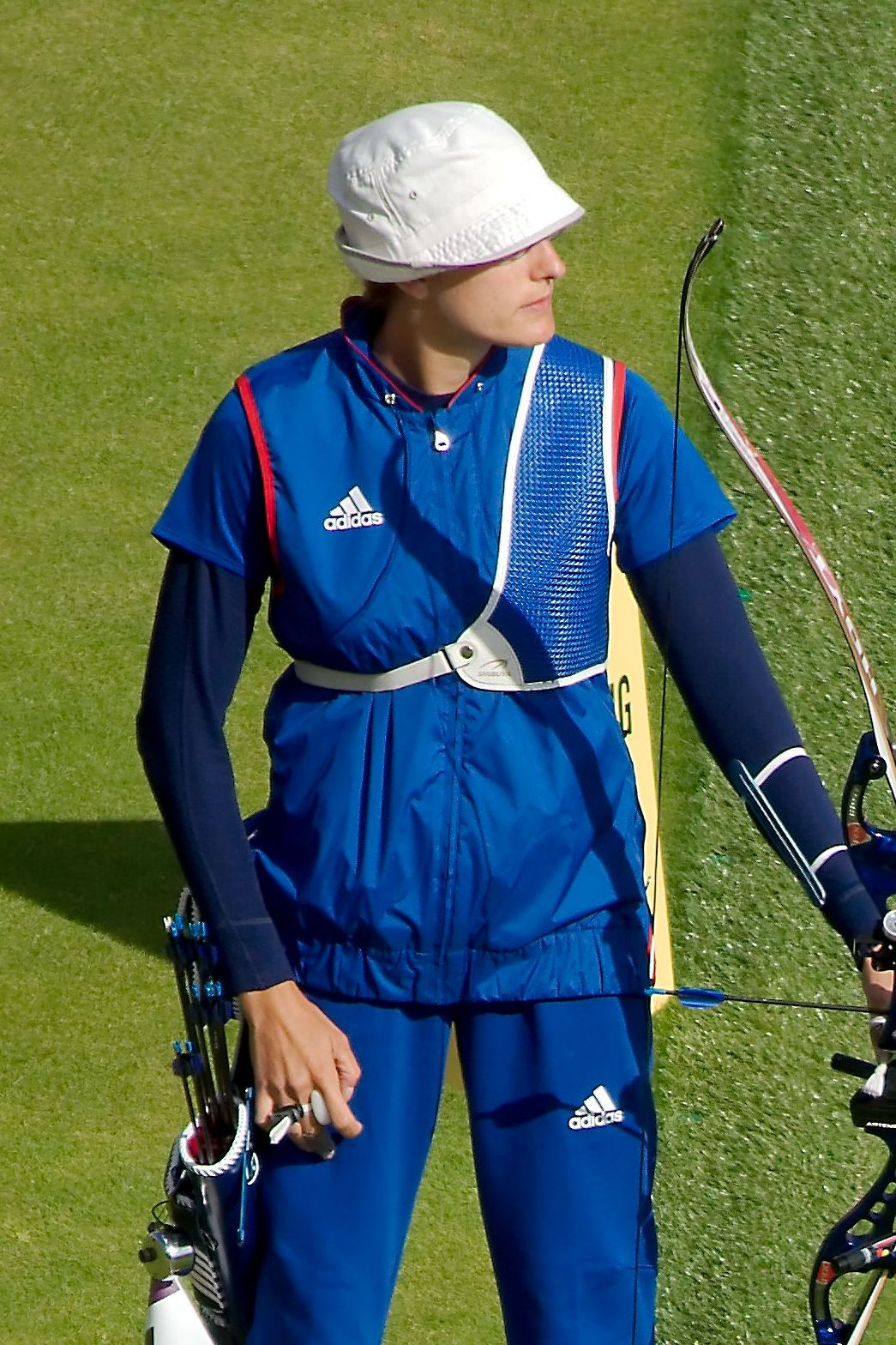
- Schuh in 2012

Medal record

Women's archery

Representing France

Olympic Games
| Bronze medal – third place | 2008 Beijing | Team |

Bérengère Schuh (born 13 June 1984 in Auxerre) is an athlete from France. She competes in archery.

== 2004 Summer Olympics ==
Schuh represented France at the 2004 Summer Olympics. She placed 31st in the women's individual ranking round with a 72-arrow score of 626. In the first round of elimination, she faced 34th-ranked Elpida Romantzi of Greece. Schuh lost 151–143 in the 18-arrow match, placing 43rd overall in women's individual archery. Schuh was also a member of the 4th-place French team in the women's team archery competition.

== 2008 Summer Olympics ==
At the 2008 Summer Olympics in Beijing Schuh finished her ranking round with a total of 645 points. This gave her the 14th seed for the final competition bracket in which she faced Pia Carmen Maria Lionetti in the first round, beating the archer from Italy with 112–107. In the second round she had no problem beating Sayoko Kitabatake with 112–100, but in the third round she was unable to surprise third seed Joo Hyun-Jung and was eliminated with 109–104.

Together with Sophie Dodemont and Virginie Arnold she also took part in the team event. With her 645 score from the ranking round combined with the 632 of Dodemont and the 626 of Arnold the French team was in fifth position after the ranking round, which gave them a straight seed into the quarter-finals. With 218–211 they were too strong for the Polish team. In the semi-final against South Korea they scored only 184 points with the Koreans scoring 213, missing out on the final. They recovered in the bronze medal match and won against Great Britain 203–201 to claim the bronze.

== 2012 Olympics ==
She reached the quarterfinals of the women's individual event at the 2012 Summer Olympics, knocking out Kaori Kawanaka, Lin Jia-En and Choi Hyeon-Ju before losing 6 -2 to Khatuna Lorig in the quarter-final.
