= Bishindeegiin Urantungalag =

Mongolian archer (born 1977)

Personal information
- Nationality: Mongolia
- Born: February 24, 1977 (age 49) Khentii Province, Mongolia
- Height: 5 ft 9 in (175 cm)
- Weight: 163 lb (74 kg)

Sport
- Sport: Archery
- Event: recurve
Medal record
Women's recurve archery
Representing Mongolia
Asian Championships
Silver medal – second place	2011 Tehran	Team

Bishindeegiin Urantungalag (Mongolian: Бишиндээгийн Урантунгалаг; 24 February 1977 in Khentii Province) is a Mongolian archer. She competed at the 2012 Summer Olympics in the women's individual event, but eliminated in the round of 16 by Lee Sung-Jin. She competed in the individual recurve event and the team recurve event at the 2015 World Archery Championships in Copenhagen, Denmark. She also represented Mongolia at the 2020 Summer Olympics.
