= Amy Oliver =

British archer (born 1987)

Personal information
- Nationality: British
- Born: 10 July 1987 (age 38) Mexborough, South Yorkshire, England

Sport
- Country: United Kingdom; England
- Sport: Archery
- Event: Recurve archery
- Club: Dearne Valley Archery Club
Medal record
Representing Great Britain
World Championships
Bronze medal – third place	2011 Turin	Mixed team recurve
World Field Archery Championships
Gold medal – first place	2016 Dublin	Individual recurve
Representing England
Commonwealth Games
Silver medal – second place	2010 Delhi	Team recurve

Amy Oliver (born 10 July 1987) is an archer from Great Britain. A competitor at the 2012 Summer Olympics, she won a silver medal at the 2010 Commonwealth Games, a bronze medal at the 2011 World Archery Championships, and was the women's individual recurve champion at the World Field Archery Championships in 2016. Oliver announced her retirement from the British national archery team in 2017.

== Early and personal life ==
Amy Oliver was born on 10 July 1987 in Mexborough, South Yorkshire. She was first introduced to archery at age seven by her parents, who both practised the sport competitively, but it was not until ten years later that Oliver became more involved, joining an archery club and attending training sessions.

== Career ==
Oliver won two medals at the European Field Championships in 2007, the second international competition in which she participated. Having achieved a silver medal in the team event, she later won gold medal in the individual event while wearing her silver medal as motivation. In 2011 she partnered with Larry Godfrey to win bronze medal in the mixed team event at the World Archery Championships in Turin.

In 2016 Oliver won the women's individual recurve title at the World Field Archery Championship in Dublin, defeating Italy's Jessica Tomasi in the final. She announced her retirement from the British national archery team in 2017. As of 2017 she is a member of the Dearne Valley Archery Club.

=== 2010 Commonwealth Games ===
Oliver participated in the 2010 Commonwealth Games as a member of the England women's recurve archery team. Alongside Naomi Folkard and Alison Williamson she reached the final of the women's team recurve event before losing narrowly to the hosts India. Having shot a low score of six with her final arrow of the match, Oliver criticised the conduct of the home crowd as distracting to her preparations for the shot, saying afterwards "I was nervous, the crowd was not good. They were pretty loud and it was not good sportsmanship for archery." The world governing body for archery, FITA, later released a statement asking spectators to observe a sense of fair play. The Telegraph referred to her silver medal as her "biggest disappointment" in a profile published prior to the 2012 Summer Olympics.

=== 2012 Summer Olympics ===
Oliver made her Olympic debut at the 2012 Summer Olympics in London. She qualified for the British Olympic team after topping the final national selection tournament for archers in April 2012, joining Naomi Folkard and Alison Williamson in contesting the women's individual and women's team events. Oliver had a difficult start to the Olympics after suffering technical problems in the preliminary ranking round, entering the elimination rounds of the individual event as the fifty-seventh seed, and combining with Folkard and Williamson to place Great Britain eleventh out of twelve nations for the team event. The results were described by The Guardian as "not encouraging" for the later rounds.

Oliver, Folkard, and Williamson were eliminated by Russia in the first round of the team event. Three days later in the opening round of the individual event Oliver delivered a surprise victory over India's Deepika Kumari, the world's number one-ranked female archer, despite shooting poorly in the match's second set. Oliver called the win over Kumari, who entered as one of the favourites in the individual competition, as "the highlight of my career" and considered it a greater achievement than her previous medal successes. She would later bow out in the second round to Indonesia's Yuliana Rochmawati.
