= Lin Chia-en =

Taiwanese archer (born 1993)

Personal information
- Native name: Upah Yabu
- Nicknames: Princess Atayal, Sunny Princess
- National team: TPE
- Born: June 2, 1993 (age 33) Hsinchu, Taiwan
- Height: 166 cm (5 ft 5 in)
- Weight: 55 kg (121 lb; 8 st 9 lb)

Sport
- Sport: Archery
Medal record
Women's recurve archery
Representing Chinese Taipei
Asian Championships
Silver medal – second place	2017 Dhaka	Team

Lin Chia-en (Chinese: 林佳恩; pinyin: Lín Jiā ēn; born 2 June 1993, in Hsinchu) is a Taiwanese archer who competed in the 2012 Summer Olympics, and again at the 2020 Summer Olympics. At the Tokyo Olympics, Lin and teammate Tang Chih-chun tied for ninth place in the new mixed team event; she was the only female archer from Chinese Taipei to advance to the individual top 16.

== Career ==
At the 2012 Summer Olympics, Lin competed for her country in the women's team event, when Taiwan finished fifth, and tied for 19th place in the women's individual event at the age of 19. Following the London Olympics, however, Lin was an alternate for the national team for many years, watching from the sidelines as the Chinese Taipei women's team won bronze at the 2016 Rio Olympics, silver at the 2018 Jakarta Asian Games, and bronze at the 2019 World Archery Championships.

Eight years later, Lin Chia-en finally qualified once again for the national team. At the Tokyo Olympics, Lin was the only female archer from Taiwan to advance to the individual top 64, and advanced to the top 32 after defeating 47-year-old Evangelia Psarra, who was competing in her sixth consecutive Olympic Games. Advancing to the top 16, she was defeated by fifth-seeded American archer Mackenzie Brown. Prior to the individual competition, Lin had partnered with Tang Chih-chun in the mixed team event, where they had narrowly missed being promoted to the top 8.

Lin trains with coach Yang Chun-chi, who describes her as a hard worker who finally started to distinguish herself in archery during the second year of high school.
