= Kaori Kawanaka =

Japanese archer (born 1991)

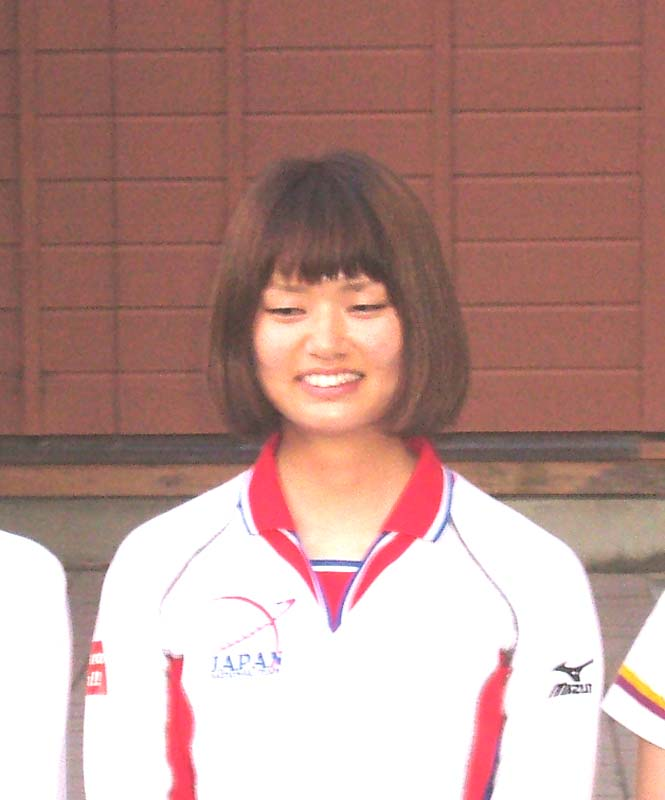

Medal record

Women's recurve archery

Representing Japan

Olympic Games
| Bronze medal – third place | 2012 London | Team |

Asian Games
| Bronze medal – third place | 2014 Incheon | Team |
| Bronze medal – third place | 2018 Jakarta-Palembang | Team |

Asian Championships
| Gold medal – first place | 2011 Tehran | Team |
| Bronze medal – third place | 2013 Taipei | Team |

Kaori Kawanaka (川中 香緒里, Kawanaka Kaori; born August 3, 1991) is a Japanese archer who competed at the 2012 and 2016 Olympic Games.

Kawanaka won a bronze medal at the 2012 Summer Olympics in the women's team event with teammates Ren Hayakawa and Miki Kanie. Their success, which came after a narrow victory over Russia in the third-place match, marked the first Olympic medal for Japan in team archery. Kawanaka was less successful in the women's individual event, losing in the opening elimination round.

Kawanaka has contested the Asian Games twice. She was the flagbearer for the Japanese team at the opening ceremony of the 2014 Asian Games, and later won bronze in the women's team recurve competition with Hayakawa and Yuki Hayashi.

At the 2016 Summer Olympics, she again competed in the individual and team events, reaching the second round in the individual event, and the quarterfinal in the women's team event.
