= Begül Löklüoğlu =

Turkish archer (born 1988)

Personal information
- Nationality: Turkish
- Born: 28 August 1988 (age 37) Ankara, Turkey
- Height: 1.62 m (5 ft 4 in) (2012)
- Weight: 57 kg (126 lb) (2012)

Sport
- Country: Turkey
- Sport: Women's archery
- Event: Recurve
- Club: İzmir Büyükşehir Belediyespor
- Coached by: Cumhur Yavaş
Medal record
Women's Archery
FITA World Cup
Bronze medal – third place	2012 Ogden	Individual
European Championships
Bronze medal – third place	2012 Amsterdam	Mixed team
European Grand Prix
Gold medal – first place	2012 Sofia	Individual
- Updated on 23 June 2012

Begül Löklüoğlu (born 28 August 1988) is a Turkish female archer competing in the recurve event. The 1.62 m (5 ft 4 in) tall athlete at 57 kg (126 lb) is a member of İzmir Büyükşehir Belediyespor.

== Biography ==
She was born on 28 August 1988 in Ankara, Turkey. She was born to sporting parents, her father is the archery federation's representative in Antalya and her mother a former volleyball player. Begül started archery at the age of 13. Her brother Berkay, who is two years younger, also competes in archery. She was educated in physical education and sports at Akdeniz University's Vocational College in Antalya.

At the 2012 European Archery Championships held in Amsterdam, Netherlands, Löklüoğlu won the bronze medal in the mixed team category along with Yağız Yılmaz.

She qualified for the 2012 Summer Olympics after winning the bronze medal at the 2012 FITA Archery World Cup's Stage 3 in Ogden, United States.

Löklüoğlu won the recurve women event at the 2012 European Grand Prix Archery's 2nd leg held in Sofia, Bulgaria beating her opponent Ksenia Perova from Russia with a score 6–4.

== Achievements ==
Year	Competition	Venue	Position	Event	Notes
Representing Turkey
2005	Festival Olimpico de Tiro con Arco 2005	Santa Tecla, El Salvador	3rd place, bronze medalist(s)	individual	
2006	FITA World Cup, # 1	Poreč, Croatia	8th	individual	
2007	FITA World Cup, # 3	Antalya, Turkey	6th	women's team	
2007	FITA World Cup, # 4	Dover, United Kingdom	8th	women's team	
2009	FITA World Cup, # 1	Santo Domingo, Dominican Republic	8th	women's team	
2012	FITA World Cup, # 2	Antalya, Turkey	7th	mixed team	
2012	European Championships	Amsterdam, Netherlands	4th	individual	
2012	European Championships	Amsterdam, Netherlands	3rd place, bronze medalist(s)	mixed team	
2012	FITA World Cup, # 3	Ogden, United States	3rd place, bronze medalist(s)	individual	
2012	European Grand Prix-2nd leg	Sofia, Bulgaria	1st place, gold medalist(s)	individual	
