= Mariana Avitia =

Mexican archer (born 1993)

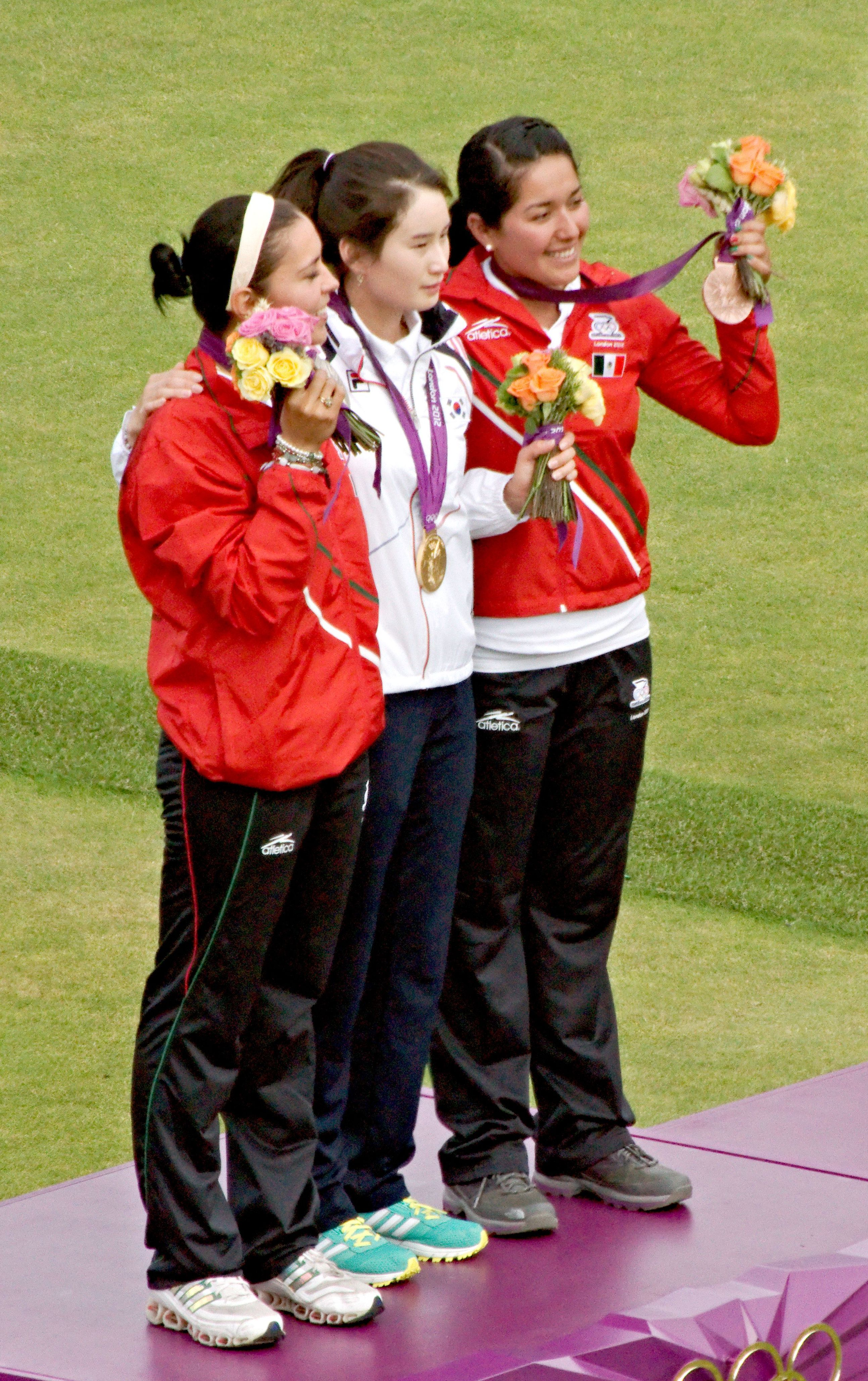
- Avitia (right) at the 2012 Summer Olympics women's individual archery event medal ceremony

Personal information
- Full name: Mariana Avitia Martínez
- Nationality: Mexican
- Born: September 18, 1993 (age 32) Monterrey, Nuevo León

Sport
- Country: Mexico
- Sport: Archery
- Event: Recurve
Medal record
Women's archery
Representing Mexico
Summer Olympics
Bronze medal – third place	2012 London	Individual
World Championships
Silver medal – second place	2017 Mexico	Team
World Cup
Silver medal – second place	2012 Ogden	Team
Silver medal – second place	2017 Berlin	Team
Silver medal – second place	2019 Antalya	Team
Bronze medal – third place	2011 Shanghai	Team
Pan American Games
Gold medal – first place	2011 Guadalajara	Team
Silver medal – second place	2019 Lima	Team
Pan American Championships
Gold medal – first place	2010 Guadalajara	Team
Silver medal – second place	2018 Medellín	Team

Mariana Avitia Martínez (born September 18, 1993) is a Mexican recurve archer. She was the first Mexican to win an Olympic medal in archery after taking bronze in the women's individual event at the 2012 Summer Olympics. She is also the youngest Mexican athlete to compete in two Olympic Games, contesting both the 2008 Summer Olympics and 2010 Summer Youth Olympics by the age of seventeen.

Avitia has represented Mexico at international archery events since 2007. In addition to her Olympic medal she has also achieved medals at the 2017 World Archery Championships and the 2011 and 2019 Pan American Games.

== Career ==
Avitia was first introduced to archery at age seven. She competed in the 2007 Pan American Games in Rio de Janeiro, finishing in 10th overall.

=== 2008–2011: Olympic debut ===
At aged 14, Avitia entered 2008 Summer Olympics as the youngest member of the Mexican Olympic team. She finished the initial 72-arrow ranking round of the women's individual event with a total of 641 points — five fewer than teammate Aída Román — giving her the 20th seed for the knock-out rounds of the tournament. Avitia began her head-to-head matches strongly with victories over North Korea's Son Hye-Yong, Poland's Malgorzata Cwienczek, and Georgia's Khatuna Narimanidze in the first three elimination rounds, the latter result being described as an upset by The Guardian. With Román's defeat in the third round to North Korea's Kwon Un-sil, Avitia advanced to the quarter-finals as the sole Mexican left in the women's competition. Facing Kwon in her quarter-final match, which took place in wet conditions, Avitia lost the twelve-arrow contest by 105 points to 99.

Avitia won five medals at the 2010 Central American and Caribbean Games, and her participation at the 2010 Summer Youth Olympics shortly afterwards made Avitia Mexico's youngest athlete to compete in two Olympic games. She narrowly missed out on a medal result, being eliminated by eventual winner Kwak Ye-ji of South Korea in the semi-finals and losing to Russia's Tatiana Segina in the bronze medal contest.

Because of her performances in the preceding years Avitia was recognised as one of the strongest competitors at the 2011 Pan American Games and a challenger for the women's individual gold medal. She was however eliminated in the second round of the individual competition, although she did succeed in winning the women's team gold medal with Román and Alejandra Valencia.

=== 2012: Olympic medalist ===
Avitia was re-selected for the Mexican team at the 2012 Summer Olympics, entering the women's individual and women's team events alongside Aída Román and Alejandra Valencia. Scoring 659 points in the 72-arrow ranking round, Avitia earned the tenth seed for the individual competition, and combined with her teammates, the fourth seed for the team event. Her Olympic competition did not begin well with the trio eliminated from the team competition at the quarter-final stage. She however had more success in the individual event, winning her first four matches – including a surprise victory over South Korea's Lee Sung-jin, the second seed and a gold medalist in the team competition – before losing to Román in the semi-finals.

As the two losing archers from the semi-final, Avitia faced Khatuna Lorig of the United States in the bronze medal match. In difficult conditions which saw unpredictable wind gusts, Avitia overcame the five-time Olympian to win her maiden Olympic medal, her bronze and Román's silver in the final securing Mexico's first ever archery Olympic medals. The pair's success marked the first time since the 1984 Summer Olympics that Mexican athletes had shared the podium in any Olympic discipline, and the first time it had been achieved by Mexican women.

=== 2013–2016: International break ===
Following the 2012 Olympics up to the end of 2015, Avitia prioritised her university studies and life outside of sport over competitive archery. Although her overall form was not consistent enough to be chosen to compete at the 2014 Central American and Caribbean Games or the 2015 Pan American Games, she nevertheless won the Mexican national championship in 2015 with victory over Aída Román in the final. In early 2016 she was unsuccessful in her bid to win selection for the 2016 Summer Olympics at the national team trials.

=== 2017–2019: Team silver medals ===
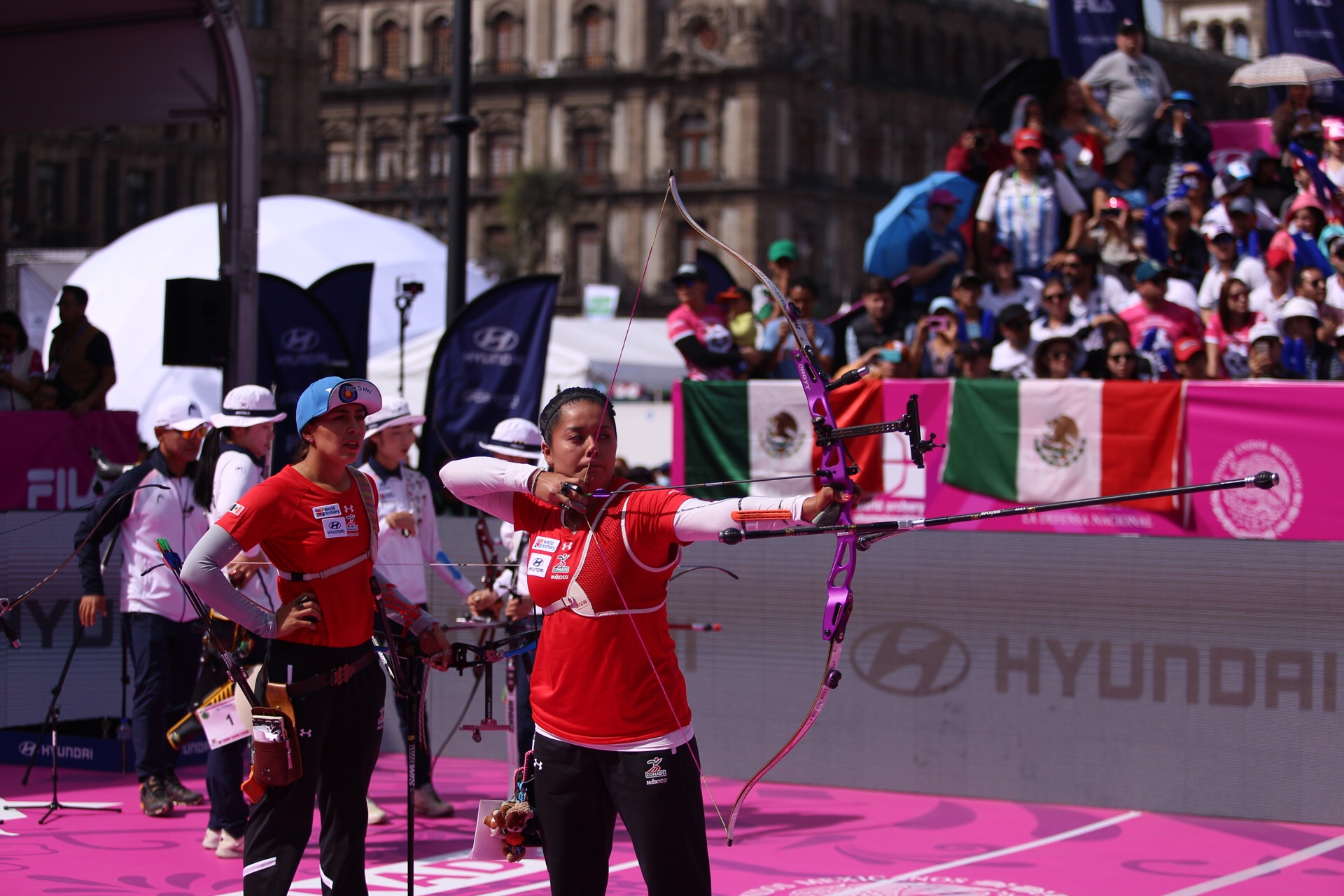
Avitia (centre) at the 2017 World Archery Championships

Avitia returned to the national team in 2017 and participated in the World Archery Championships taking place on home soil in México City. Although she did not advance beyond the third round in the women's individual event, she and teammates Aída Román and Alejandra Valencia reached the final of the women's team competition to face the reigning champions South Korea. Despite a strong start the trio were unable to overcome the South Koreans, who recorded their thirteenth title in the women's team discipline. Avitia, Román, and Valencia received silver medals as runners-up.

A mixed 2018 followed for Avitia, as she failed to achieve selection for the 2018 Central American and Caribbean Games in March – only entering the competition as the Mexican team's reserve behind Román, Valencia, and Ana Paula Vázquez – before helping win silver medal in the women's team event of August's Pan American Archery Championships in Medellín.

In 2019 Avitia was she successfully re-selected to the national team, her third place in the national trials being rewarded with entries for the year's World Archery Championship in June and Pan American Games in August. She however had a disappointing World Championships when she, Román and Valencia were eliminated from the team competition prior to the quarter-final stage, a loss that ended Mexico's chances of qualifying for the women's team event at the 2020 Summer Olympics. The Pan American Games two months later saw Avitia contributing to another women's team silver medal and achieving Mexico's 134th medal of the games, a new national record.
