= Louise Laursen =

Danish archer (born 1988)

Personal information
- Full name: Louise Laursen
- Nationality: Danish
- Born: 27 June 1988 (age 38)
- Height: 5 ft 7 in (1.70 m)
- Weight: 132 lb (60 kg)

Louise Laursen (born 27 June 1988 in Aarhus) is an athlete from Denmark who competes in archery.

At the 2012 Summer Olympics in London Laursen defeated Canada's Marie-Pier Beaudet 7–3, but was defeated by American Khatuna Lorig 4–6.

At the 2008 Summer Olympics in Beijing Laursen finished her ranking round with a total of 605 points. This gave her the 52nd seed for the final competition bracket in which she faced Malgorzata Cwienczek in the first round. The archer from Poland was too strong for Laursen and won the confrontation with 113–100, eliminating her straight away.
