= Archery Olympic Round =

Competition format in archery

The Olympic Round was introduced to target archery so that it could become more watchable as a competitive sport, the main focus of this being for the Olympics when shown on television. The round was developed by the World Archery Federation (WA; formerly FITA). It is used at the Olympic Games, the Archery World Cup and in many lower profile or local tournaments.

== Individual event ==
A qualifying round is shot to order the competitors and give them a seeding. The qualifying round is usually a WA 70m round, consisting of 72 arrows shot at a distance of 70 meters. These seedings are then sorted into head-to-head matches.

Each match consists of 4 ends of 3 arrows, giving a 12-arrow match shot at a distance of 70 meters on a 122 cm target face. In early stages of the elimination rounds this may be changed to 2 ends of 6 arrows in order to save time. In later stages and at the Olympics and World Cup the shooting order alternates with each archer shooting one arrow at a time, having 40 seconds to shoot each arrow. The highest placed athlete in the qualification round will decide the order of shooting of the first end. The athlete with the lowest cumulative score will shoot first at the next end. If the athletes are tied, the athlete that shot first in the first end shoots first in the next end. The archer with the highest score at the end of the 12 arrows is declared the winner.

In the event of a tie each archer shoots a single arrow; the archer with the highest scoring arrow wins. If there is still a tie a second single arrow is shot, and, if required, a third. On the third arrow if there is still a tie the archer with the arrow closest to the center is the winner. If an archer shoots after their time of 40 seconds or at the wrong time they will lose their highest scoring arrow.

== Team event ==
Teams are made up of three archers from the same discipline (male or female, recurve or compound bows). The teams shoot a qualifying round and are seeded on the combined score of the team.

A team match consists of 4 ends of each archer shooting 2 arrows, making 24 arrows in total. The team has 2 minutes to shoot all 6 arrows. All archers start in a box 1 meter from the shooting line. Once the time has started one archer may leave the box and shoot. Only one archer may be out of the box at a time.

In the event of a tie, each team member will shoot one arrow each. The team will have 1 minute to shoot the 3 arrows. The team with the highest total score is the winner. If still tied another 3 arrow are shot, and a third extra end if required. If still tied in the third extra end the team with an arrow closest to the center of the target wins; if these are the same distance from the center the team with the second arrow closest arrow is the winner, and the third if need be.

In addition to the fouls above there are additional fouls for the team round. If an archer leaves the box before the previous archer has entered the box a 'foot fault' is called and the archer must re-enter the box before leaving again. The archer must not remove an arrow from their quiver until they are on the shooting line, otherwise they must re-enter the box and return the arrow to their quiver before leaving again. For both of these fouls the judge will display a yellow card. If the archer does not obey the judge they will receive a red card and lose their highest scoring arrow.

== Sets ==
Since April 2010 the sets system has been used instead of the 12-arrow match. Elimination rounds are up of up to 3 sets of 6 arrows, and the finals are made up of up to 5 sets of 3 arrows. If a competitor wins a set they receive two points; if the set is drawn the competitors receive one point each. If a competitor has not won a majority of the sets (2 in a 3 set match and 3 in a 5 set match) the outcome is decided by a single arrow shoot-off with the competitor closest to the middle being declared the winner.
