= Ephraim S. Claybourn =

- Born: February 8, 1851; Dix, Illinois, U.S.
- Died: 1909; Champaign, Illinois
- Occupation: Canal engineer
- Parent(s): William Divine Claybourn (1819–1896); Francis Alla Hawker (1820-1863)

Ephraim S. Claybourn (February 8, 1851 – 1909) was the first superintendent of all floating equipment of the United States government's property on the Panama Canal Zone.

== Early life and career ==
Claybourn was born on February 8, 1851, in Dix, Illinois, to William D. Claybourn and Frances Alla Hawker. His nephew John G. Claybourn and cousin Vern Claybourn both held positions of prominence with the Panama Canal, making work there a family business of sorts. His great-granddaughter is skeet shooting champion Becky McCumber.

Ephraim began working for the U.S. government in 1891 as an engineer on the Missouri River. In 1892, he was transferred to the Mississippi River and worked on the dredge fleet at Memphis, Tennessee. He worked first as chief engineer of a centrifugal dredge, then as master of dredges, and later as master mechanic in which he built and operated the extensive dredging plant shops. At the time the plant included eight of the largest dredges afloat.

== Panama Canal work ==
In 1905, the Isthmian Canal Commission sought engineers for work on the canal's construction, and since Claybourn was considered one of the best for such work, he accepted a position as superintendent of all floating equipment of the U.S. government property on the Canal Zone. He oversaw a staff of about 500 men and was paid $3,000 per year.

Claybourn designed and constructed the drydock shops at Cristóbal, Colón, and rebuilt the "Old French" dock to accommodate larger vessels. He also supervised the construction of various canal machines, including several dredges and a variety of "Old French" machinery that was adapted to American methods.

Claybourn worked on the canal for about three years but resigned after a fall which affected his heart. He died in 1909.
