= USA Shooting =

Non-profit organisation in the US

- Sport: Shooting sports
- Jurisdiction: National
- Abbreviation: USAS
- Founded: 1995
- Affiliation: ISSF
- Headquarters: Olympic Training Center, Colorado Springs, Colorado, U.S.
- Chairman: Tim Rupli
- CEO: Kelly Reisdorf

Official website
- usashooting.org
- (United States)

USA Shooting (USAS), a 501(c)(3) non-profit organization, was chartered by the United States Olympic & Paralympic Committee as the National Governing Body (NGB) for the sport of shooting in April 1995. USA Shooting's mission is to prepare American athletes to compete at the Olympic Games, promote the shooting sports throughout the U.S., and govern the conduct of international shooting in the country. The organization implements and manages development programs and sanctions events at the local, state, regional, and national levels.

== Origins ==
Prior to 1979, a year-round U.S. Shooting Team did not exist. Athletes trained independently and met once a year to try out for major events such as the Olympics and World Championships. Once the matches were over the team disbanded until the following year.

Spurred on by the Amateur Sports Act of 1978, the National Rifle Association of America (NRA) mandated the establishment of National Teams and National Development Teams, a national coaching staff, year-round training programs, and a main training site for Olympic shooting sports. USA Shooting replaced the NRA as the governing body in 1995.

== Facility ==
USA Shooting is headquartered at the U.S. Olympic & Paralympic Training Center (OPTC) in Colorado Springs, Colorado. The Olympic and Paralympic Shooting Center was built in 1985 and is used for elite and resident athletes training, competitions, national championships, coaching seminars, camps, committee meetings, and local clubs. Approximately 25 resident and Olympic athletes train at the OTC during the year.

The Shooting Center is the largest indoor shooting facility in the Western Hemisphere and the third largest in the world. Three separate ranges provide 29 firing points from 50 meters and 73 firing points from 10 meters for training and competitions. It also houses the administration offices, a gunsmith room and locker rooms for resident and visiting athletes.

In addition to the indoor ranges at the OTC, the outdoor ranges at the International Shooting Park are also used by U.S. Shooting Team members. Construction began in 1985 on 102 acres (41 ha) of land leased to the United States Olympic Committee on the edge of the U.S. Army's Fort Carson. Four superimposed international-style skeet and bunker trap fields, shade shelters and a clubhouse have been completed.

== Operations ==
The sport of shooting now involves 15 events in which the U.S. has the opportunity to win Olympic medals. It is a sport enjoyed by men and women of various ages. The 2004 National Team comprised athletes ranging in age from 15 to 50. There have been over 100 Olympic medals won by the U.S. since its inception. Out of the top-10 American Olympic medalists of all time, three are shooters, and the sport is ranked third in total U.S. medals won-behind track and field and swimming.

== USA Shooting Team Foundation ==
In 2021, USA Shooting reinstated the USA Shooting Team Foundation. U.S. Olympic athletes are largely supported by individual and corporate donations, whereas most other countries provide government or state funding for elite athletes, putting American athletes at a disadvantage. The Foundation has a mission "to provide philanthropic support to USA Shooting, ensuring athletes have access to the best facilities, coaching, training, and support in their pursuit of Olympic and Paralympic medals".

== Hall of fame ==
The organization maintains a hall of fame whose inductees have included:

- Gary Lee Anderson
- Morris Fisher
- Becky McCumber
- William McMillan
- Margaret Murdock
- Carl Osburn
- Lones Wigger

== Suspensions ==
In June 2021, Olympic team nominee Keith Sanderson was handed a suspension by the United States Center for SafeSport for sexual misconduct. He was then promptly excluded from the U.S. delegation for the 2020 Summer Olympics in Tokyo. Sanderson was previously suspended by USA Shooting in 2018, to which he responded by claiming the action was driven by the organization's desire to punish him for his criticism of the USOPC.
