= 2008 Summer Olympics =

Multi-sport event in Beijing, China

Games of the XXIX Olympiad
- Emblem of the 2008 Summer Olympics (Note: The official logo for the 2008 Summer Olympics, featuring a depiction of the Chinese pictogram "京", from the word Beijing (北京) representing a dancing human figure, in reference to the host city. Below are the words "Beijing 2008" located above the Olympic rings.)
- Location: Beijing, China
- Motto: One World, One Dream (同一个世界 同一个梦想; Tóng yīge shìjìe tóng yīge mèngxiǎng)
- Nations: 204
- Athletes: 10,899 (6,290 men, 4,609 women)
- Events: 302 in 28 sports (42 disciplines)
- Opening: 8 August 2008
- Closing: 24 August 2008
- Opened by: President Hu Jintao
- Closed by: IOC President Jacques Rogge
- Cauldron: Li Ning
- Stadium: Beijing National Stadium

The 2008 Summer Olympics (Chinese: 2008年夏季奥运会), officially the Games of the XXIX Olympiad (Chinese: 第二十九届夏季奥林匹克运动会) and officially branded as Beijing 2008 (Chinese: 北京2008), were an international multi-sport event held from 8 to 24 August 2008, in Beijing, China. (Note: Although the Games officially started on 8 August 2008, the first football matches were held on 6 August.) A total of 10,942 athletes from 204 National Olympic Committees (NOCs) competed in 28 sports and 302 events, one event more than those scheduled for the 2004 Summer Olympics. This was the first time China had hosted the Olympic Games, and the third time the Summer Olympic Games had been held in East Asia, following the 1964 Olympics in Tokyo, Japan, and the 1988 Olympics in Seoul, South Korea. These were also the second Summer Olympic Games to be held in a communist state, the first being the 1980 Summer Olympics in the Soviet Union (with venues in Russia, Ukraine, Byelorussia, and Estonia). The games were the first and only Olympics (both Summer and Winter) held in Beijing with spectators, as the 2022 Winter Games were held without spectators due to the COVID-19 pandemic. By hosting the 2022 Winter Olympics, Beijing became the first ever city to host both the Summer and Winter Games.

Beijing was awarded the 2008 Games over four competitors on 13 July 2001, having won a majority of votes from members of the International Olympic Committee (IOC) after two rounds of voting. The government of China actively promoted the 2008 Games and invested heavily in new sports venues and transportation infrastructure. 37 venues were used to host the events, including twelve constructed specifically for the 2008 Games. The equestrian events were held in Hong Kong, making these the third Olympics for which the events were held under the jurisdiction of two different NOCs. (Note: The other two instances were the 1956 Summer Olympics, where the equestrian events were held in Stockholm, Sweden, due to strict Australian quarantine rules, and the other Olympic events were held in Melbourne, Australia; and the 1920 Summer Olympics, which were hosted by Antwerp, Belgium, but the final two races of the 12 ft (3.7 m) dinghy event in sailing took place in the Netherlands.) The sailing events were contested in Qingdao, while the football events took place across several different cities.

The official logo for the 2008 Games, titled "Dancing Beijing" (舞动北京), created by Guo Chunning (郭春宁), featured the Chinese character for capital (京, stylized into the shape of a human being) in reference to the host city. The 2008 Olympics were watched by 3.5 billion people worldwide, and featured the longest distance for an Olympic Torch relay. The 2008 Games also set numerous world and Olympic records, and were the most expensive Summer Olympics of all time, and the second most expensive overall, after the 2014 Winter Games in Sochi. The opening ceremony was lauded by spectators and numerous international presses as spectacular, spellbinding, and by many accounts, "the greatest ever in the history of Olympics".

An unprecedented 87 countries won at least one medal during the 2008 Games. Host nation China won the most gold medals (48), and became the seventh different team to top the Summer Olympics medal standings, winning a total of 100 medals overall. The United States placed second in the gold medal tally but won the highest number of medals overall (112). The third place in the gold and overall medal tally was achieved by Russia.

This Olympic Games marked the return of the Summer Olympic Games to Asia after the 1988 Olympics in South Korea. It was the first Olympics for Serbia as a separate state since 1912 and the first for Montenegro, having separated from Serbia in 2006. It was also the first Olympics for Nepal as a republic, the Marshall Islands and Tuvalu. Mongolia and Panama each won their first Olympic gold medal. In addition, Afghanistan, Mauritius, Serbia, Sudan, Tajikistan and Togo won their first Olympic medals at these Games. North Korea, having symbolically marched with South Korea as one team at the opening ceremonies of the preceding three Games that it entered (2000 in Sydney, 2004 in Athens, and 2006 in Turin), paraded separately this time.

== Organisation ==
=== Bid ===
Under the direction of Liu Qi, Beijing was elected as the host city for the 2008 Summer Olympics on 13 July 2001, during the 112th IOC Session in Moscow, defeating bids from Toronto, Paris, Istanbul, and Osaka. Prior to the session, five other cities (Bangkok, Cairo, Havana, Kuala Lumpur, and Seville) had submitted bids to the IOC, but failed to make the short list chosen by the IOC Executive Committee in 2000. After the first round of voting, Beijing held a significant lead over the other four candidates. Osaka received only six votes and was eliminated. In the second round, Beijing was supported by a majority of voters, eliminating the need for subsequent rounds. Toronto's bid was its fifth loss since 1960 (failed bids for 1960, 1964, 1976 and 1996 Games, losing to Rome, Tokyo, Montreal and Atlanta).

When bidding for the Games, Beijing actually proposed different dates (25 July – 10 August for the Games of the XXIX Olympiad and 27 August – 7 September for the XIII Paralympic Games).

Members of the IOC did not disclose their votes, but news reports speculated that broad international support led to China's selection, especially from developing nations that had received assistance from China to construct stadiums. The size of China, its increased enforcement of doping controls, and sympathy concerning its loss of the 2000 Summer Olympics to Sydney were all factors in the decision. Eight years earlier, Beijing had led every round of voting for the 2000 Summer Olympics before losing to Sydney by two votes in the final round.

Human rights concerns expressed by Amnesty International and politicians in both Europe and North America were considered by the delegates, according to IOC Executive Director François Carrard. Carrard and others suggested that the selection might lead to improvements in human rights in China. In addition, many IOC delegates who had formerly been athletes expressed concern about heat and air quality during the Games, considering the high levels of air pollution in Beijing. China outlined plans to address these environmental concerns in its bid application.

2008 Summer Olympics bidding results
City	Country	Round	
City	Country	1	2
Beijing	China	44	56
Toronto	Canada	20	22
Paris	France	15	18
Istanbul	Turkey	17	9
Osaka	Japan	6	—

=== Costs ===
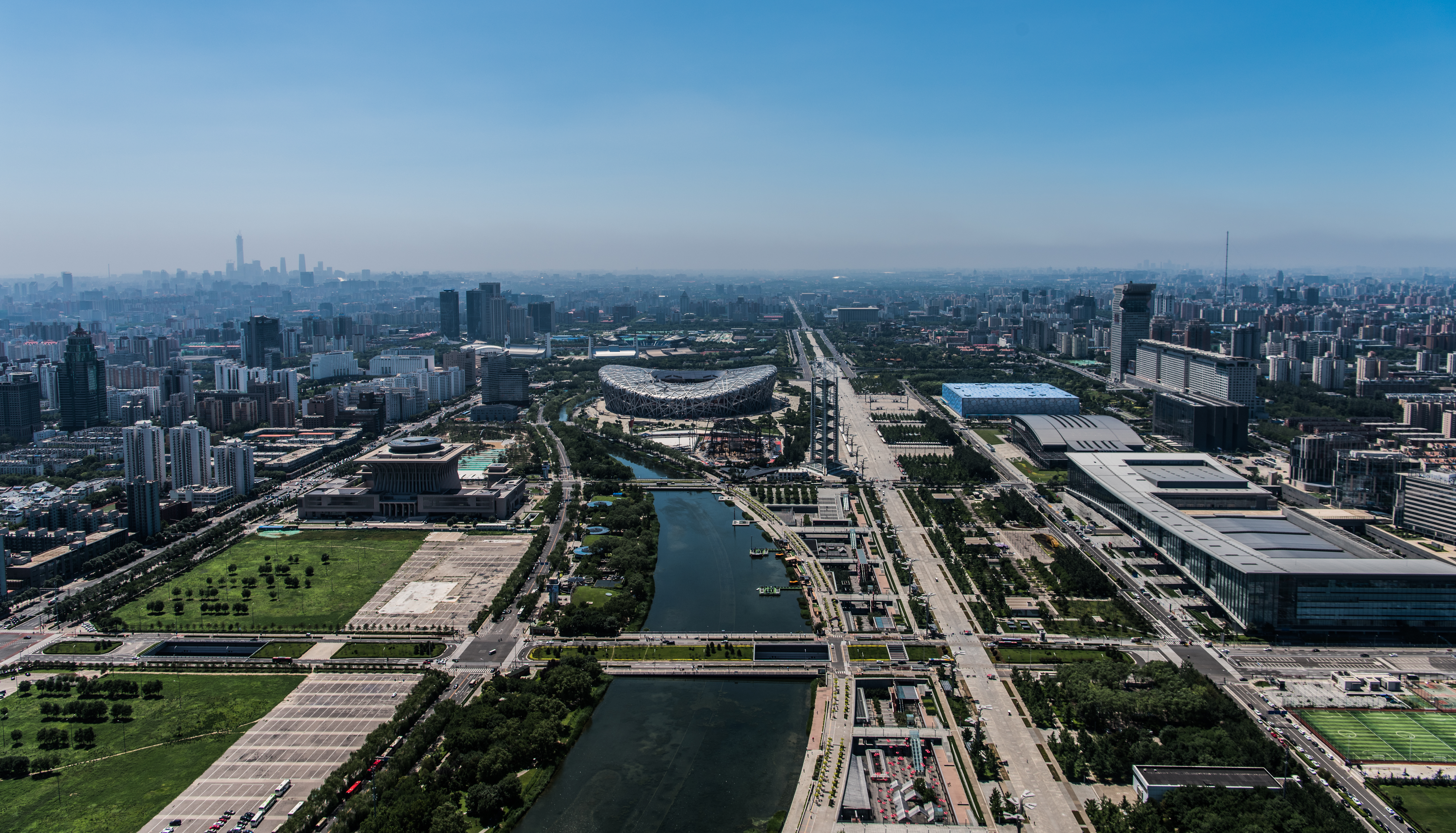
Olympic Green, from above

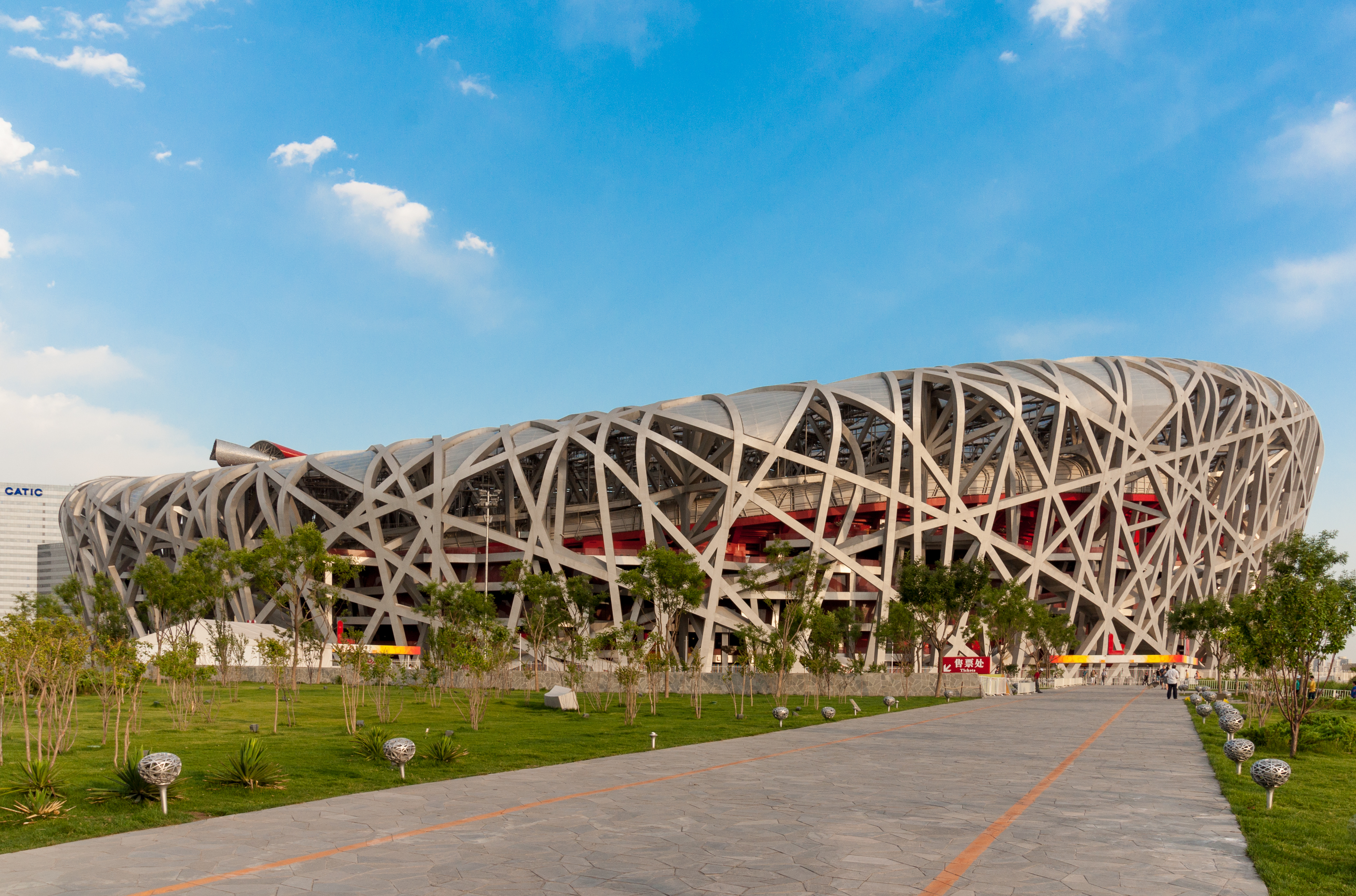
Beijing National Stadium, or "Bird's Nest"

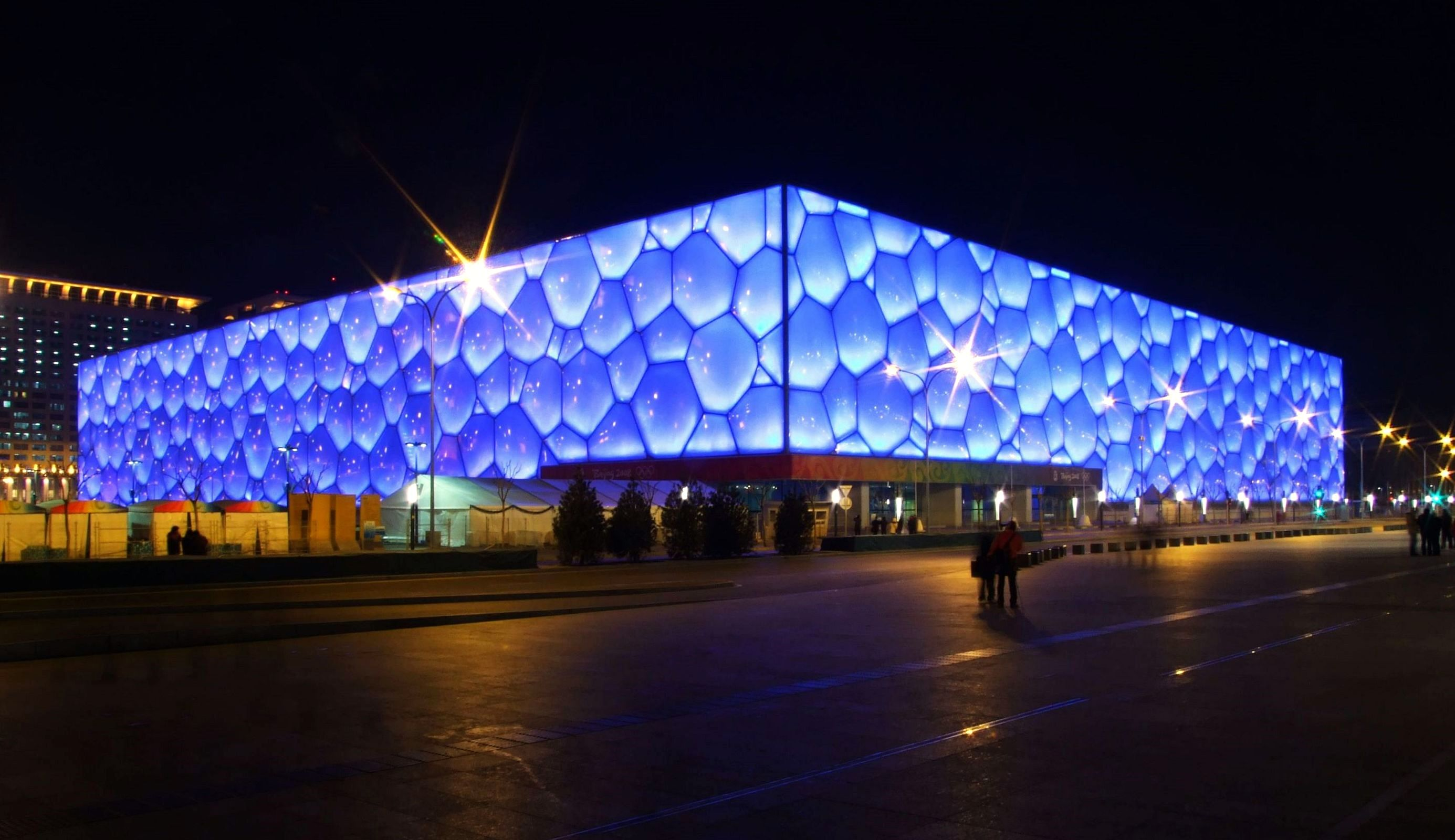
National Aquatics Center or "Water Cube"

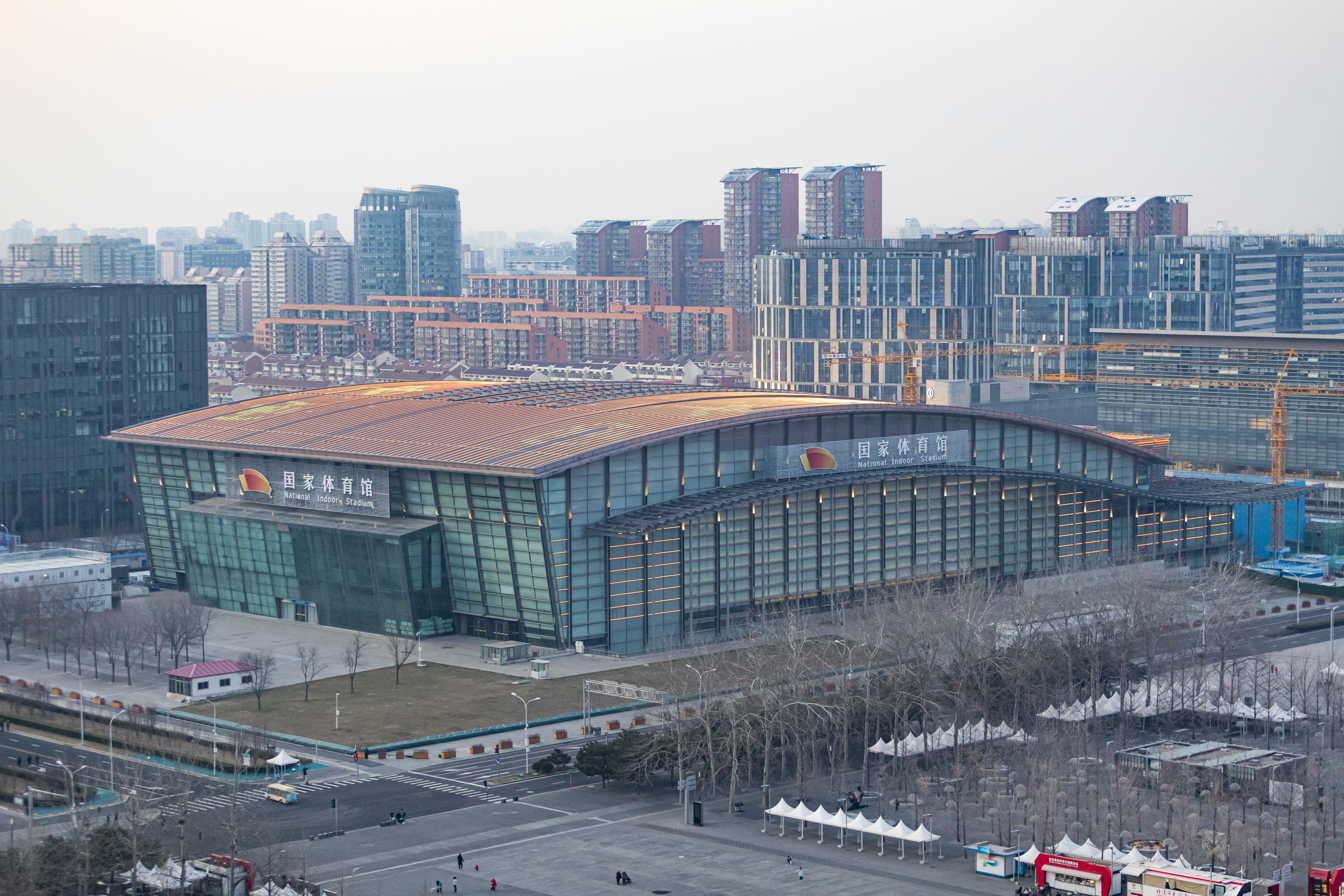
National Indoor Stadium

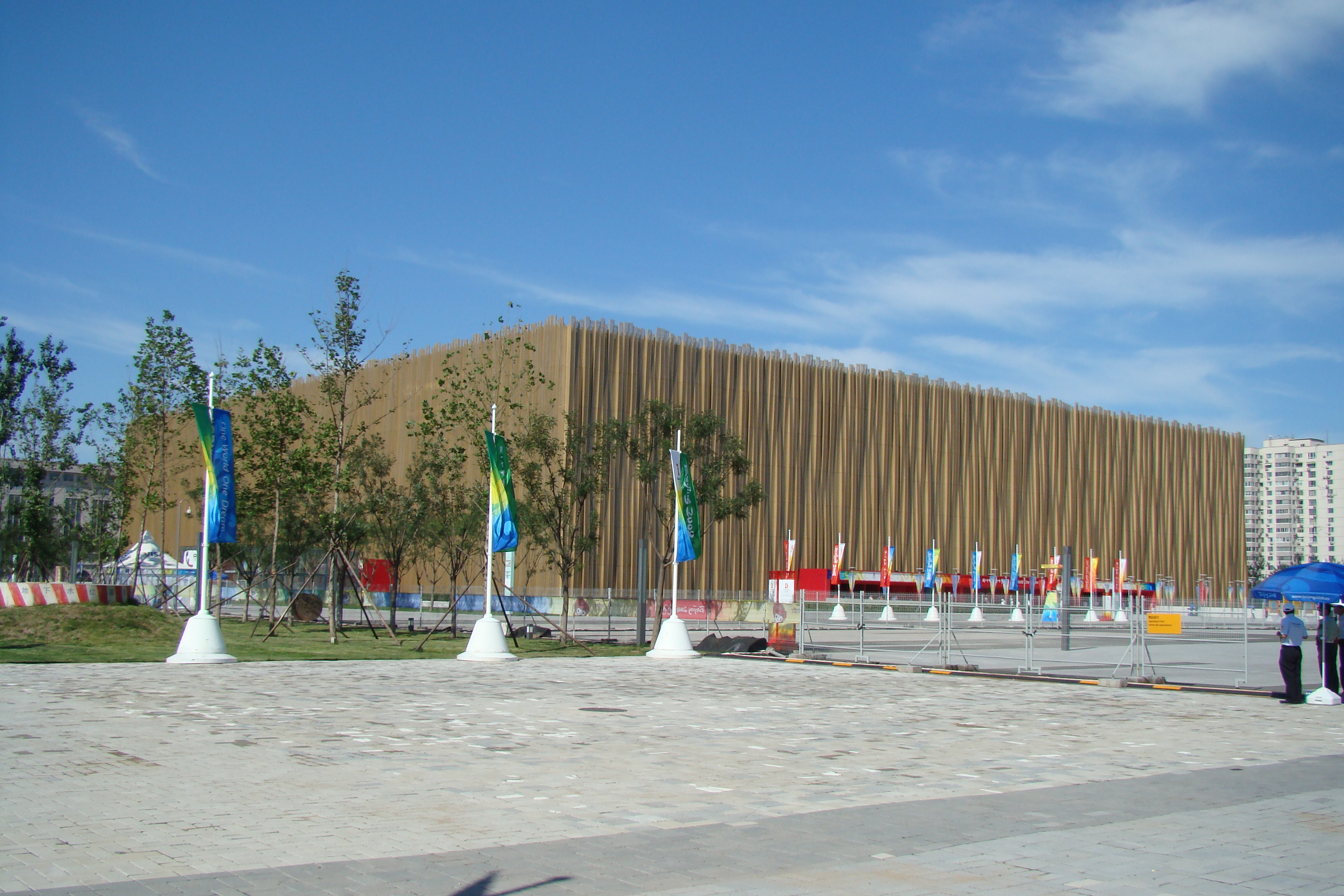
Wukesong Indoor Stadium

On 6 March 2009, the Beijing Organizing Committee for the Olympic Games reported that total spending on the Games was "generally as much as that of the Athens 2004 Olympic Games", which was equivalent to about US$15 billion. They went on to claim that surplus revenues from the Games would exceed the original target of $16 million. Other reports, however, estimated the total costs from $40 to $44 billion, which would make the Games "far and away the most expensive ever". Its budget was later exceeded by the 2014 Winter Olympics in Sochi, which suffered from major cost overruns; the 2014 Winter Olympics costed roughly US$50 billion in public funding. The Oxford Olympics Study 2016 estimates the outturn cost of the Beijing 2008 Summer Olympics at US$6.8 billion in 2015-dollars. This includes sports-related costs only, such as those incurred by the organizing committee or those incurred by the host city, country, and private investors to build structures required to host the Games. Indirect capital costs—those not directly related to staging the Games—are not included. The Beijing Olympics' cost of US$6.8 billion compares with costs of US$4.6 billion for Rio 2016 and US$15 billion for London 2012.

=== Venues ===
By May 2007 the construction of all 31 Beijing-based Olympic Games venues had begun. The Chinese government renovated and constructed six venues outside Beijing, and constructed 59 training facilities. The largest structures built were the Beijing National Stadium, Beijing National Indoor Stadium, Beijing National Aquatics Center, Peking University Gymnasium, Olympic Green Convention Center, Olympic Green, and Beijing Wukesong Culture & Sports Center. Almost 85% of the construction budget for the six main venues was funded by $2.1 billion (RMB¥17.4 billion) in corporate bids and tenders. Investments were expected from corporations seeking ownership rights after the Olympics. Some events were held outside Beijing, namely football in Qinhuangdao, Shanghai, Shenyang, and Tianjin; sailing in Qingdao; and, because of the "uncertainties of equine diseases and major difficulties in establishing a disease-free zone", the equestrian events were held in Hong Kong. Some stadiums were built on the former site of hutong neighbourhoods, including Qianmen Subdistrict.

The showpiece of the 2008 Summer Olympics was the Beijing National Stadium, nicknamed "The Bird's Nest" because of its nest-like skeletal structure. The stadium hosted both the opening and closing ceremonies, as well as the athletics competition. Construction of the venue began on 24 December 2003. The Guangdong Olympic Stadium was originally planned, constructed, and completed in 2001 to help host the Games, but a decision was made to construct a new stadium in Beijing. In 2001, the city held a bidding process to select the best arena design. Several criteria were required of each design, including flexibility for post-Olympics use, a retractable roof, and low maintenance costs. The entry list was narrowed to thirteen final designs. The bird's nest model submitted by architects Jacques Herzog and Pierre de Meuron in collaboration with Li Xinggang of China Architecture Design and Research Group (CADG) was selected as the top design by both a professional panel and by a broader audience during a public exhibition. The selection of the design became official in April 2003. Construction of the stadium was a joint venture among the original designers, project architect Stefan Marbach, artist Ai Weiwei, and a group of CADG architects led by Li Xinggang. Its $423 million cost was funded by the state-owned corporate conglomerate CITIC and the Beijing State-Owned Assets Management Company.

=== Transport ===
A map of the Olympic venues in Beijing. Several expressways encircle the center of the city, providing for quick transportation around the city and between venues.

To prepare for Olympic visitors, Beijing's transportation infrastructure was expanded. Beijing's airport underwent a major renovation with the addition of the new Terminal 3, designed by architect Norman Foster. Within the city itself, Beijing's subway was doubled in capacity and length, with the addition of seven lines and 80 stations to the previously existing four lines and 64 stations. Included in this expansion was a new link connecting to the city's airport. A fleet of thousands of buses, minibuses, and official cars transported spectators, athletes, and officials between venues.

In an effort to improve air quality, the city placed restrictions on construction sites and gas stations and limited the use of commercial and passenger vehicles in Beijing. From 20 July through 20 September, passenger vehicle restrictions were placed on alternative days depending on the terminal digit of the car's license plate. It was anticipated that this measure would take 45% of Beijing's 3.3 million cars off the streets. The boosted public transport network was expected to absorb the demand created by these restrictions and the influx of visitors, which was estimated at more than 4 million additional passengers per day.

=== Marketing ===
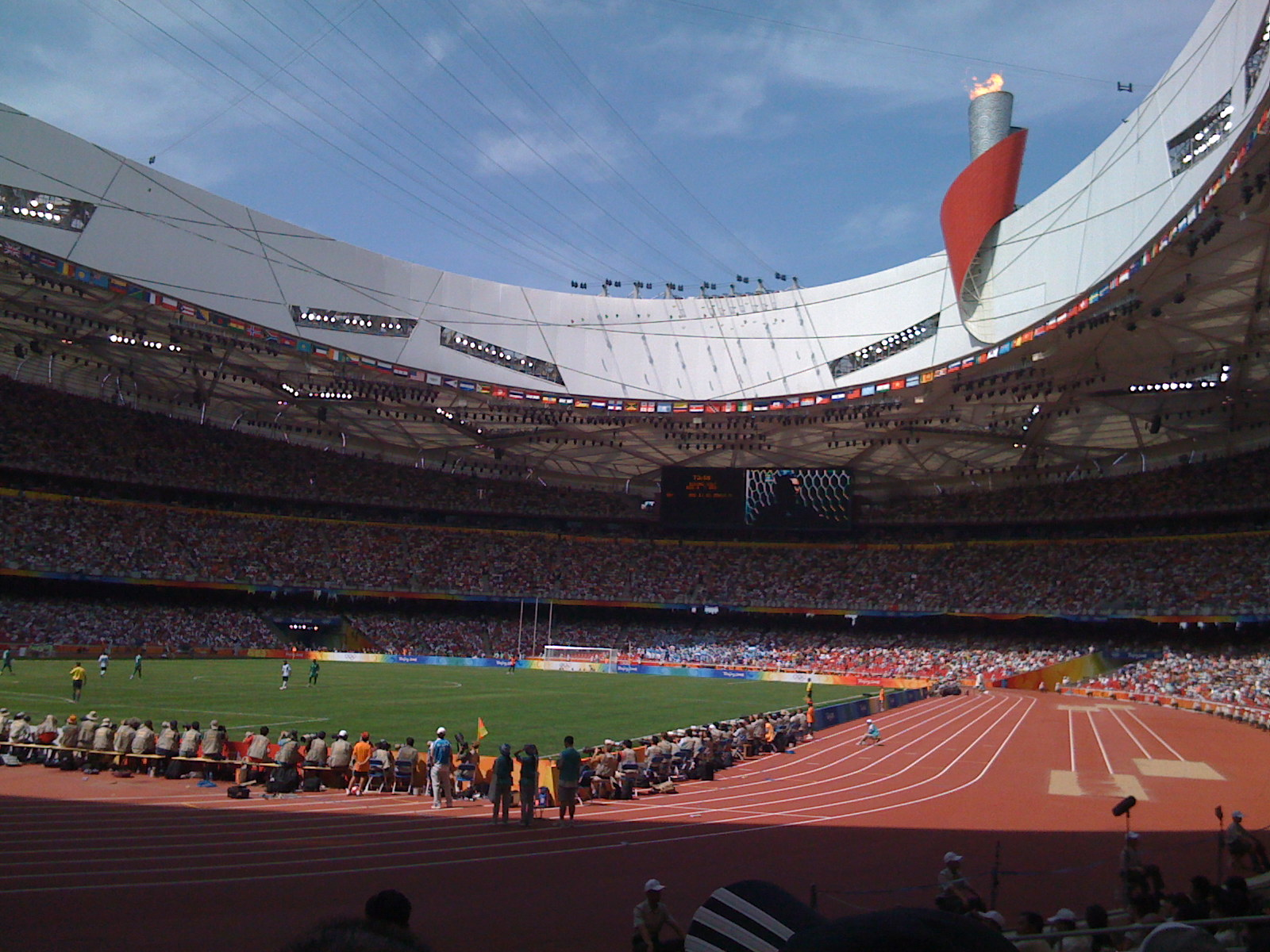
Inside Beijing National Stadium during the Games. Olympic cauldron in background.

The 2008 Summer Olympics emblem was known as Dancing Beijing. The emblem combined a traditional Chinese red seal and a representation of the calligraphic character for "capital" (京, also the second character of Beijing's Chinese name) with athletic features. The open arms of the calligraphic word symbolized the invitation from China to the world to share in its culture. IOC president Jacques Rogge was rather pleased with the emblem, saying, "Your new emblem immediately conveys the awesome beauty and power of China which are embodied in your heritage and your people."

The official motto for the 2008 Olympics was "One World, One Dream" (同一个世界 同一个梦想). It called upon the whole world to join in the Olympic spirit and build a better future for humanity, and was chosen from over 210,000 entries submitted from around the world. Following the announcement of the motto, the phrase was used by international advocates of Tibetan secession. Banners reading "One World, One Dream, Free Tibet" were unfurled from various structures around the globe in the lead up to the Beijing Olympics, such as from the San Francisco Golden Gate Bridge and the Sydney Opera House in Australia.

The mascots of Beijing 2008 were the five Fuwa, each of which represented both a color of the Olympic rings and a symbol of Chinese culture. In 2006, the Beijing Organizing Committee for the Olympic Games released pictograms of 35 Olympic disciplines (however, for some multidiscipline sports such as cycling, a single pictogram was released). This set of sport icons was named the beauty of seal characters, because of each pictogram's likeness to Chinese seal script.

=== Mascots ===
The mascots of the 2008 Summer Olympics were the Fuwa, created by Han Meilin (韩美林). The mascots consisted of Beibei, a fish, Jingjing, a panda, Huanhuan, an Olympic flame, Yingying, a Tibetan antelope, and Nini, a sand martin kite. When their Chinese characters are combined, they form 北京欢迎你, or "Beijing Welcomes You". A year before the Games in 2007, the 100-episode The Olympic Adventures of Fuwa featuring the mascots, was released.

=== Media coverage ===
The 2008 Games were the first to be produced and broadcast entirely in high definition by the host broadcaster. In comparison, American broadcaster NBC broadcast only half of the Turin 2006 Winter Olympics in HD. In their bid for the Olympic Games in 2001, Beijing stated to the Olympic Evaluation Commission that there would be "no restrictions on media reporting and movement of journalists up to and including the Olympic Games." However, some media outlets claimed that organizers ultimately failed to live up to this commitment. (Note: The New York Times, for instance, said that "those promises have been contradicted by strict visa rules, lengthy application processes and worries about censorship.")

According to Nielsen Media Research, 4.7 billion viewers worldwide tuned in to some of the television coverage, one-fifth larger than the 3.9 billion who watched the 2004 Olympic Games in Athens. American broadcaster NBC produced only two hours of online streaming video for the 2006 Winter Games but produced approximately 2,200 hours of coverage for the 2008 Summer Games. CNN reported that, for the first time, "live online video rights in some markets for the Olympics have been separately negotiated, not part of the overall 'broadcast rights.'" The new media of the digital economy was said to be growing "nine times faster than the rest of the advertising market."

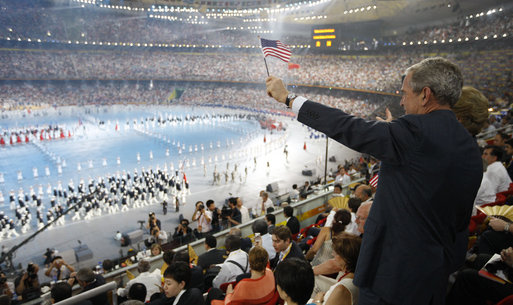
US President George W. Bush at the 2008 Summer Olympics

The international European Broadcasting Union (EBU) provided live coverage and highlights of all arenas only for certain territories on their website, Eurovisionsports.tv. Many national broadcasters likewise restricted the viewing of online events to their domestic audiences. The General National Copyright Administration of China announced that "individual (sic) and websites will face fines as high as 100,000 yuan for uploading recordings of Olympic Games video to the internet", part of an extensive campaign to protect the pertinent intellectual property rights. The Olympic Committee also set up a separate YouTube channel at Beijing 2008.

The games were the first to have global digital coverage and 153 million people watched live broadcasts online.

=== Theme song ===
The theme song of the 2008 Summer Olympics was "You and Me", which was composed by Chen Qigang, the musical director of the opening ceremony. It was performed during the opening ceremony by Chinese singer Liu Huan and British singer Sarah Brightman. The theme song was originally going to be a song called "So much love, so far away (Tanto amor, tan lejos)" written by Cuban singer-songwriter Jon Secada and Peruvian singer-songwriter Gian Marco under production from Cuban producer Emilio Estefan Jr. from EMI.

=== Podium ===
The podiums used during the 2008 Summer Olympics featured a design strongly influenced by Chinese cultural identity, incorporating the "Lucky Cloud" motif as their central graphical element. In Chinese mythology, lucky clouds are associated with blessings and harmony, and are traditionally depicted alongside deities.

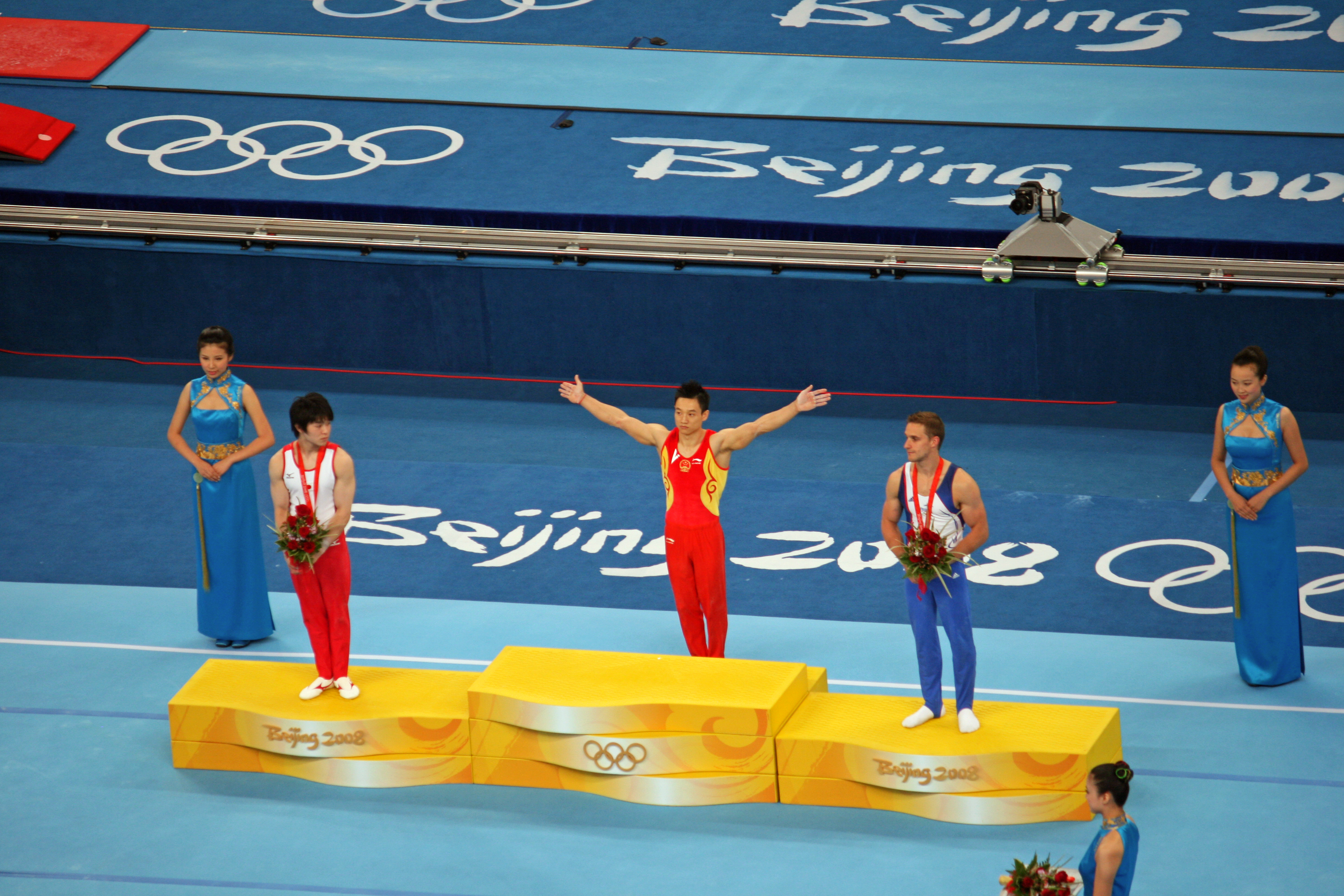
The 2008 Summer Olympics gymnastics men's individual all-around podium

The podiums were produced in a square format and incorporated a traditional Chinese ribbon pattern, which organizers stated symbolized the ability of the Olympic Games to connect people around the world through sport.

== Torch relay ==
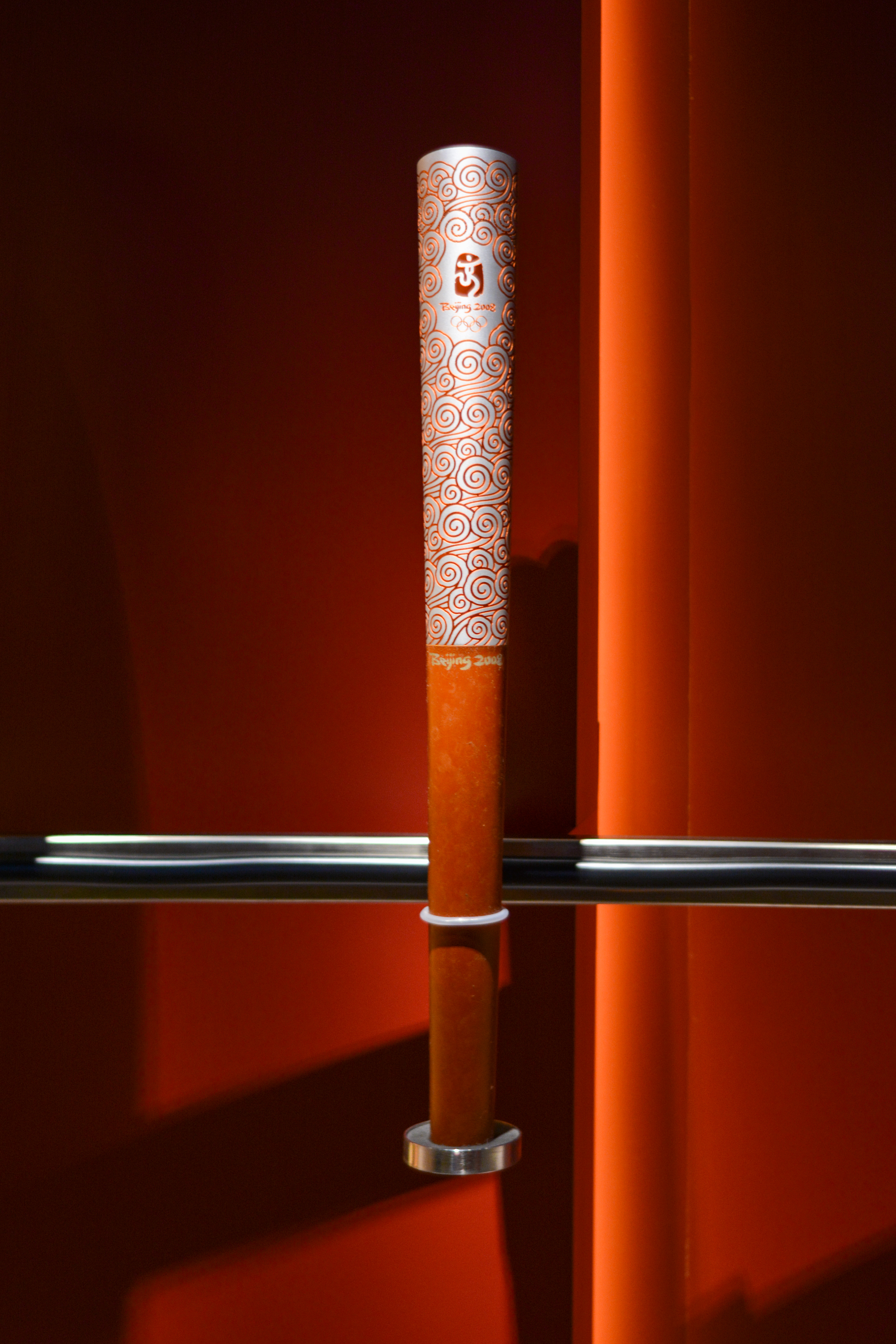
2008 Olympic Torch in the Olympic Museum.

The design of the 2008 Olympic Torch was based on traditional scrolls and used a traditional Chinese design known as the "Propitious Clouds" (祥云). The torch was designed to remain lit in 65 km/h (40 mph) winds, and in rain of up to 50 mm (2 in) per hour.

The relay, with the theme "Journey of Harmony", was met with protests and demonstrations by pro-Tibet supporters throughout its journey. It lasted 130 days and carried the torch 137,000 km (85,000 mi)—the longest distance of any Olympic torch relay since the tradition began at the 1936 Berlin Games. The torch relay was described as a "public relations disaster" for China by USA Today, with protests against China's human rights record, particularly focused on Tibet. The IOC subsequently barred future Olympics organizers from staging international torch relays.

The relay began 24 March 2008, in Olympia, Greece. From there, it traveled across Greece to Panathinaiko Stadium in Athens, and then to Beijing, arriving on 31 March. From Beijing, the torch followed a route passing through every continent except Antarctica. The torch visited cities on the Silk Road, symbolizing ancient links between China and the rest of the world. A total of 21,880 torchbearers were selected from around the world by various organizations and entities.

The international portion of the relay was problematic. The month-long world tour encountered wide-scale anti-Chinese protests. After trouble in London involving attempts by protesters to put out the flame, the torch was extinguished in Paris the following day. The American leg in San Francisco on 9 April was altered without prior warning to avoid such disturbances, although there were still demonstrations along the original route. The relay was further delayed and simplified after the 2008 Sichuan earthquake hit western China.

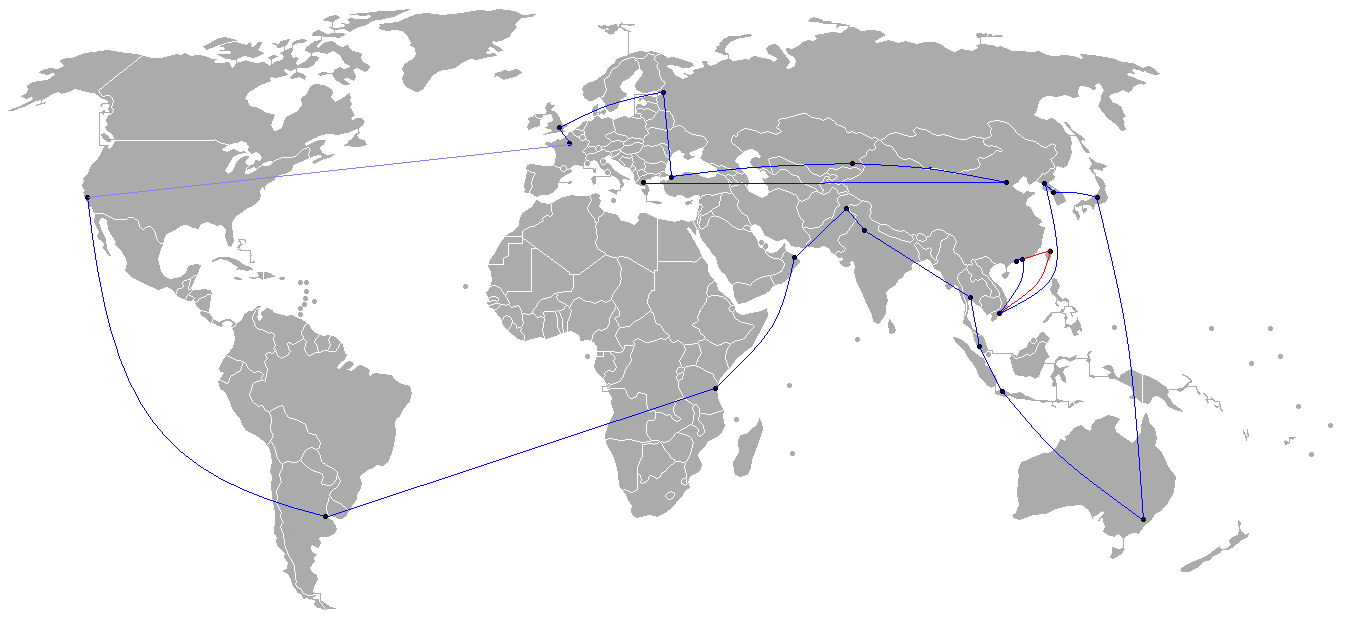
Route of the 2008 Olympic Torch Relay

The flame was carried to the top of Mount Everest on a 108 km (67 mi) long "highway" scaling the Tibetan side of the mountain, built especially for the relay. The $19.7 million blacktop project spanned from Tingri County of Xigazê Prefecture to the Everest Base Camp. In March 2008, China banned mountaineers from climbing its side of Mount Everest, and later persuaded the Nepalese government to close their side as well, officially citing environmental concerns. It also reflected concerns by the Chinese government that Tibet activists might try to disrupt its plans to carry the Olympic torch up the world's tallest peak.

The originally proposed route would have taken the torch through Taipei after leaving Vietnam and before heading for Hong Kong. However, the government of Taiwan (then led by the independence-leaning Democratic Progressive Party) objected to this proposal, claiming that this route would make the portion of the relay in Taiwan appear to be part of the torch's domestic journey through China, rather than a leg on the international route. This dispute, as well as Chinese demands that the flag and the national anthem of the Republic of China be banned along the route led the government of Taiwan to reject the proposal that it be part of the relay route. The two sides of the Taiwan Strait subsequently blamed each other for injecting politics into the event.

== The Games ==
=== Participating National Olympic Committees ===
Participating nations Blue = Participating for the first time. Green = Have previously participated. Yellow square is host city (Beijing)

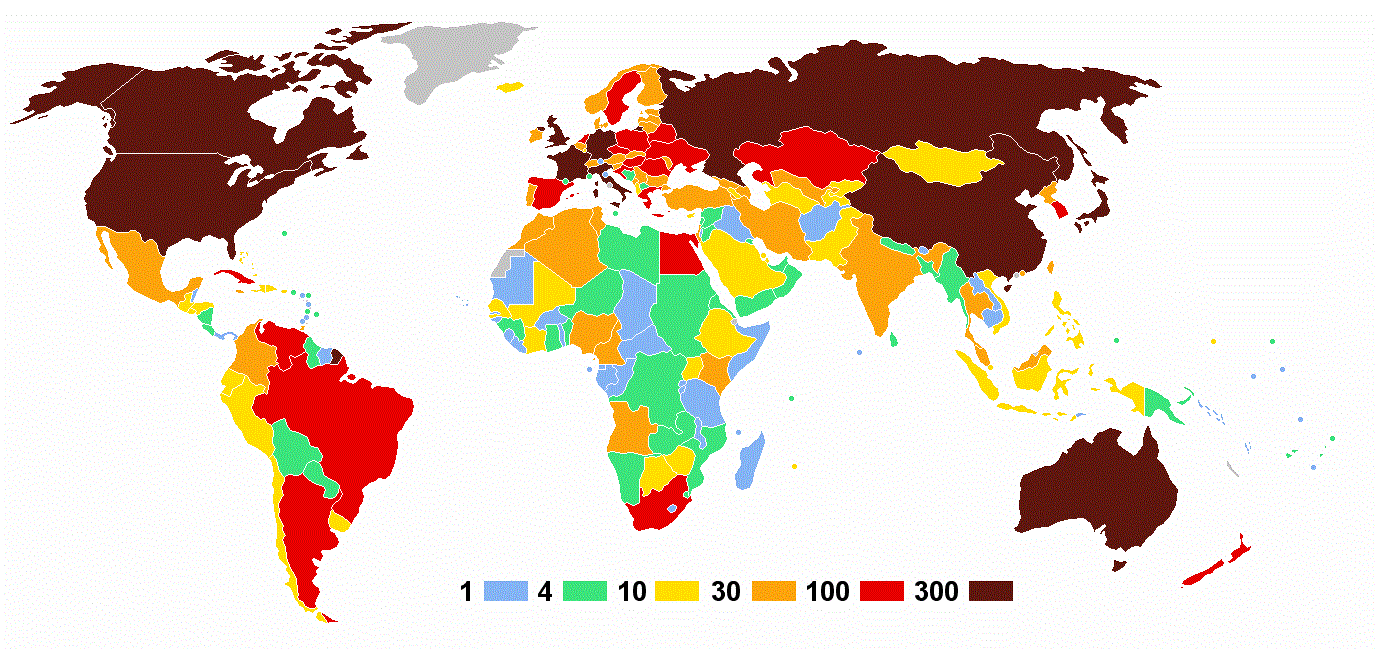
Team sizes

All but one of the 205 recognized National Olympic Committees (NOCs) that existed as of 2008 participated in the 2008 Summer Olympics, the exception being Brunei. Three countries participated in the Olympic Games for their first time: the Marshall Islands, Montenegro and Tuvalu.

While not a full member recognized by the IOC and thus not allowed to compete formally in the Olympics, the Macau Sports and Olympic Committee sent a delegation to participate in the Wushu Tournament Beijing 2008, being the only unrecognized National Olympic Committee to have taken part in the 2008 Summer Olympics. It also coordinated efforts with the Chinese Olympic Committee to organize the torch relay through Macau.

The Marshall Islands and Tuvalu gained National Olympic Committee status in 2006 and 2007 respectively, and 2008 was the first Games in which they were eligible to participate. The states of Serbia and Montenegro, which participated at the 2004 Games jointly as Serbia and Montenegro, competed separately for the first time since Serbia last participated in 1912. Montenegro made its debut appearance, as the Montenegrin Olympic Committee was accepted as a new National Olympic Committee in 2007. Neighboring Kosovo, however, did not participate. After the declaration of independence in Kosovo, the IOC specified requirements that Kosovo needs to meet before being recognized by the IOC; most notably, it has to be recognized as independent by the United Nations. However, it has since been recognised by the IOC in 2014 without fulfilling these criteria and made its debut in the 2016 games.

More than 100 sovereigns, heads of state and heads of government as well as 170 Ministers of Sport attended the Beijing Olympic Games.

Participating National Olympic Committees
- Afghanistan (4 athletes)
- Albania (11)
- Algeria (56)
- American Samoa (4)
- Andorra (5)
- Angola (32)
- Antigua and Barbuda (5)
- Argentina (132)
- Armenia (25)
- Aruba (2)
- Australia (432)
- Austria (70)
- Azerbaijan (44)
- Bahamas (25)
- Bahrain (14)
- Bangladesh (5)
- Barbados (8)
- Belarus (177)
- Belgium (94)
- Belize (4)
- Benin (5)
- Bermuda (6)
- Bhutan (2)
- Bolivia (7)
- Bosnia and Herzegovina (5)
- Botswana (11)
- Brazil (268)
- British Virgin Islands (2)
- Bulgaria (70)
- Burkina Faso (6)
- Burundi (3)
- Cambodia (4)
- Cameroon (32)
- Canada (332)
- Cape Verde (2)
- Cayman Islands (4)
- Central African Republic (3)
- Chad (2)
- Chile (26)
- China (639) (host)
- Colombia (67)
- Comoros (3)
- Republic of the Congo (5)
- Democratic Republic of the Congo (5)
- Cook Islands (4)
- Costa Rica (8)
- Croatia (99)
- Cuba (158)
- Cyprus (17)
- Czech Republic (134)
- Denmark (84)
- Djibouti (2)
- Dominica (2)
- Dominican Republic (24)
- Ecuador (25)
- Egypt (100)
- El Salvador (11)
- Equatorial Guinea (3)
- Eritrea (10)
- Estonia (47)
- Ethiopia (27)
- Fiji (6)
- Finland (57)
- France (309)
- Gabon (4)
- The Gambia (3)
- Georgia (35)
- Germany (420)
- Ghana (9)
- Great Britain (304)
- Greece (152)
- Grenada (9)
- Guam (6)
- Guatemala (12)
- Guinea (5)
- Guinea-Bissau (3)
- Guyana (4)
- Haiti (7)
- Honduras (25)
- Hong Kong (34)
- Hungary (171)
- Iceland (27)
- India (53)
- Indonesia (24)
- Iran (54)
- Iraq (4)
- Ireland (55)
- Israel (43)
- Italy (333)
- Ivory Coast (21)
- Jamaica (50)
- Japan (351)
- Jordan (7)
- Kazakhstan (132)
- Kenya (46)
- Kiribati (2)
- North Korea (63)
- South Korea (267)
- Kuwait (8)
- Kyrgyzstan (20)
- Laos (4)
- Latvia (47)
- Lebanon (6)
- Lesotho (5)
- Liberia (3)
- Libya (6)
- Liechtenstein (2)
- Lithuania (71)
- Luxembourg (13)
- Macedonia (7)
- Madagascar (6)
- Malawi (4)
- Malaysia (33)
- Maldives (4)
- Mali (17)
- Malta (6)
- Marshall Islands (5)
- Mauritania (2)
- Mauritius (11)
- Mexico (83)
- Federated States of Micronesia (5)
- Moldova (29)
- Monaco (5)
- Mongolia (28)
- Montenegro (19)
- Morocco (47)
- Mozambique (4)
- Myanmar (6)
- Namibia (10)
- Nauru (1)
- Nepal (8)
- Netherlands (237)
- Netherlands Antilles (3)
- New Zealand (178)
- Nicaragua (6)
- Niger (4)
- Nigeria (74)
- Norway (84)
- Oman (5)
- Pakistan (21)
- Palau (5)
- Palestine (4)
- Panama (5)
- Papua New Guinea (7)
- Paraguay (7)
- Peru (13)
- Philippines (15)
- Poland (257)
- Portugal (77)
- Puerto Rico (22)
- Qatar (22)
- Romania (101)
- Russia (467)
- Rwanda (4)
- Saint Kitts and Nevis (4)
- Saint Lucia (4)
- Saint Vincent and the Grenadines (2)
- Samoa (6)
- San Marino (4)
- São Tomé and Príncipe (3)
- Saudi Arabia (16)
- Senegal (15)
- Serbia (87)
- Seychelles (9)
- Sierra Leone (3)
- Singapore (25)
- Slovakia (57)
- Slovenia (61)
- Solomon Islands (3)
- Somalia (2)
- South Africa (134)
- Spain (283)
- Sri Lanka (8)
- Sudan (9)
- Suriname (4)
- Swaziland (4)
- Sweden (123)
- Switzerland (83)
- Syria (7)
- Chinese Taipei (80)
- Tajikistan (15)
- Tanzania (9)
- Thailand (51)
- Timor-Leste (1)
- Togo (4)
- Tonga (3)
- Trinidad and Tobago (28)
- Tunisia (26)
- Turkey (68)
- Turkmenistan (10)
- Tuvalu (3)
- Uganda (11)
- Ukraine (243)
- United Arab Emirates (8)
- United States (596)
- Uruguay (12)
- Uzbekistan (56)
- Vanuatu (3)
- Venezuela (108)
- Vietnam (21)
- Virgin Islands (7)
- Yemen (5)
- Zambia (8)
- Zimbabwe (13)

==== National participation changes ====
Flag of the Chinese Taipei Olympic Committee.

Athletes from the Republic of China (Taiwan) competed at the 2008 Games as Chinese Taipei (TPE) under the Chinese Taipei Olympic flag and used the National Banner Song as their official anthem. The participation of Taiwan was briefly in doubt because of disagreements over the name of their team in the Chinese language and concerns about Taiwan marching in the opening ceremony next to the special administrative region of Hong Kong. A compromise based at the Nagoya Resolution about the naming was reached some months before the opening ceremonies, and Taiwan was referred to during the Games as "Chinese Taipei", rather than "Taipei, China," as the mainland China government had proposed. In addition, the Central African Republic was placed between Taipei and Hong Kong on protocol order.

Starting in 2005, North Korea and South Korea held meetings to discuss the possibility of sending a united team to the 2008 Olympics. The proposal failed, because of disagreements about how athletes would be chosen; North Korea was demanding a certain percentage representation for its athletes. A subsequent attempt to broker an agreement for the two nations to walk together during the March of Nations failed as well, despite their having done so during the 2000 and 2004 Games.

On 24 July 2008, the International Olympic Committee (IOC) banned Iraq from competing in the 2008 Olympic Summer Games because of "political interference by the government in sports." The IOC reversed its decision five days later and allowed the nation to compete after a pledge by Iraq to ensure "the independence of its national Olympics panel" by instituting fair elections before the end of November. In the meantime, Iraq's Olympic Organization was to be run by "an interim committee proposed by its national sports federations and approved by the IOC."

Brunei Darussalam was due to take part in the 2008 Summer Olympic Games. However, they were disqualified on 8 August, having failed to register either of their two athletes. The IOC spokeswoman Emmanuelle Moreau said in a statement that "it is a great shame and very sad for the athletes who lose out because of the decision by their team not to register them. The IOC tried up until the last minute, midday Friday 8 August 2008, the day of the official opening, to have them register, but to no avail." Brunei's Ministry of Culture, Youth and Sports issued a press release stating that their decision not to participate was due to an injury to one of their athletes.

Georgia announced on 9 August 2008, that it was considering withdrawing from the Beijing Olympic Games because of the 2008 South Ossetia war, but it went on to compete while the conflict was still ongoing.

==== Participation of athletes with disabilities ====
South African swimmer Natalie du Toit, whose left leg was amputated following a motor scooter accident, qualified to compete at the Beijing Olympics. The five time gold medalist at the Athens Paralympics in 2004 made history by becoming the first amputee to qualify for the Olympic Games since Olivér Halassy in 1936. She was able to compete in the Olympics rather than the Paralympics because she does not use a prosthetic leg while swimming. Polish athlete Natalia Partyka, who was born without a right forearm, competed in Table Tennis in the 2008 Summer Olympics and 2008 Paralympic Games.

=== Sports ===
The program for the Beijing Games was quite similar to that of the 2004 Summer Olympics held in Athens. There were 28 sports and 302 medal events at the 2008 Games. Nine new events were held, including two from the new cycling discipline of BMX. Women competed in the 3,000-meter (9,843 ft) steeplechase for the first time. Open water swimming events for men and women, over the distance of 10 kilometers (6.2 mi), were added as another aquatics discipline. Team events (men and women) in table tennis replaced the doubles events. In fencing, the women's team foil and women's team sabre replaced men's team foil and women's team épée. (Note: The fencing program included six individual events and four team events; the FIE's rules call for the set of team events to be different from those held in the previous Games and for at least one team event in each weapon to be contested. The fourth event is determined by a vote. In 2004, the three men's team events (foil, sabre, épée) and the women's épée were held, so in 2008, both the women's foil and sabre events, as well as the men's épée, were automatically selected. The fourth event, men's sabre, was chosen over men's foil by a 45:20 vote.) Two sports and one discipline were open only to men, baseball, boxing and greco-roman wrestling, while one sport and two disciplines were open only to women, softball, synchronized swimming and rhythmic gymnastics. Equestrian and mixed badminton are the only sports in which men and women compete together, although three events in the Sailing allowed the opportunity for both males and female participants. However, only male participants took part in all three events.

The following were the 302 medal events in 28 sports that were contested at the Games. The number of events contested in each sport is indicated in parentheses (in sports with more than one discipline, as identified by the IOC, these are also specified).

2008 Summer Olympics Sports Programme

- Aquatics
  - Diving (8)
  - Marathon swimming (2)
  - Swimming (32)
  - Synchronized swimming (2)
  - Water polo (2)
- Archery (4)
- Athletics (47)
- Badminton (5)
- Baseball (1)
- Basketball (2)
- Boxing (11)
- Canoeing
  - Slalom (4)
  - Sprint (12)
- Cycling
  - BMX (2)
  - Road (4)
  - Track (10)
  - Mountain bike (2)
- Equestrian
  - Dressage (2)
  - Eventing (2)
  - Jumping (2)
- Fencing (10)
- Field hockey (2)
- Football (2)
- Gymnastics
  - Artistic (14)
  - Rhythmic (2)
  - Trampoline (2)
- Handball (2)
- Judo (14)
- Modern pentathlon (2)
- Rowing (14)
- Sailing (11)
- Shooting (15)
- Softball (1)
- Table tennis (4)
- Taekwondo (8)
- Tennis (4)
- Triathlon (2)
- Volleyball
  - Beach volleyball (2)
  - Volleyball (2)
- Weightlifting (15)
- Wrestling
  - Freestyle (11)
  - Greco-Roman (7)

In addition to the official Olympic sports, the Beijing Organizing Committee was given special dispensation by the IOC to run a wushu competition in tandem with the Games. The 2008 Beijing Wushu Tournament saw 128 athletes from 43 countries participate, with medals awarded in 15 separate events; however, these were not to be added to the official medal tally since Wushu was not on the official program of the 2008 Summer Olympics.

=== Calendar ===
In the following calendar for the 2008 Summer Olympics, each blue box represents an event competition, such as a qualification round, on that day. The yellow boxes represent days during which medal-awarding finals for a sport were held. Each bullet in these boxes is an event final, the number of bullets per box representing the number of finals that were contested on that day. On the left, the calendar lists each sport with events held during the Games, and at the right how many gold medals were won in that sport. There is a key at the top of the calendar to aid the reader.

All dates are Beijing Time (UTC+8)

OC	Opening ceremony	●	Event competitions	1	Gold medal events	EG	Exhibition gala	CC	Closing ceremony

August 2008		6th Wed	7th Thu	8th Fri	9th Sat	10th Sun	11th Mon	12th Tue	13th Wed	14th Thu	15th Fri	16th Sat	17th Sun	18th Mon	19th Tue	20th Wed	21st Thu	22nd Fri	23rd Sat	24th Sun	Events
Ceremonies				OC																CC	—N/a
Aquatics	Diving					1	1	1	1		●	●	1	●	1	●	1	●	1		46
Aquatics	Marathon swimming															1	1				46
Aquatics	Swimming				●	4	4	4	4	4	4	4	4								46
Aquatics	Synchronized swimming													●	●	1		●	1		46
Aquatics	Water polo					●	●	●	●	●	●	●	●	●	●	●	1	●		1	46
Archery					●	1	1	●	●	1	1										4
Athletics											2	4	6	6	5	3	6	7	7	1	47
Badminton					●	●	●	●	●	●	1	2	2								5
Baseball/Softball
Baseball/Softball	Baseball								●	●	●	●		●	●	●		●	1		2
Baseball/Softball	Softball							●	●	●	●	●	●	●		●	1				2
Basketball					●	●	●	●	●	●	●	●	●	●	●	●	●	●	1	1	2
Boxing					●	●	●	●	●	●	●	●	●	●	●	●		●	4	6	11
Canoeing	Slalom						●	2	●	●	2										16
Canoeing	Sprint													●	●	●	●	6	6		16
Cycling	Road cycling				1	1			2												18
Cycling	Track cycling										1	3	1	2	3						18
Cycling	BMX															●		2			18
Cycling	Mountain biking																		2		18
Equestrian					●	●	●	2	●	1	●	●	●	1	1		1				6
Fencing					1	1	1	1	2	1	1	1	1								10
Field hockey						●	●	●	●	●	●	●	●	●	●	●	●	1	1		2
Football		●	●		●	●		●	●		●	●		●	●		1	●	1		2
Gymnastics	Artistic				●	●		1	1	1	1	●	4	3	3	EG					18
Gymnastics	Rhythmic																●	●	1	1	18
Gymnastics	Trampolining											●		1	1						18
Handball					●	●	●	●	●	●	●	●	●	●	●	●	●	●	1	1	2
Judo					2	2	2	2	2	2	2										14
Modern pentathlon																	1	1			2
Rowing					●	●	●	●	●		●	7	7								14
Sailing					●	●	●	●	●		●	●	3	2	2	2	2				11
Shooting					2	2	2	2	1	2	1	2	1								15
Table tennis									●	●	●	●	1	1	●	●	●	1	1		4
Taekwondo																2	2	2	2		8
Tennis						●	●	●	●	●	●	1	3								4
Triathlon														1	1						2
Volleyball	Beach volleyball				●	●	●	●	●	●	●	●	●	●	●	●	1	1			4
Volleyball	Indoor volleyball				●	●	●	●	●	●	●	●	●	●	●	●	●	●	1	1	4
Weightlifting					1	2	2	2	2		2	1	1	1	1						15
Wrestling								2	2	3		2	2		2	2	2				18
Daily medal events					7	14	13	19	17	15	18	27	37	18	20	11	21	21	32	12	302
Cumulative total					7	21	34	53	70	85	103	130	167	185	205	216	237	258	290	302	302
August 2008		6th Wed	7th Thu	8th Fri	9th Sat	10th Sun	11th Mon	12th Tue	13th Wed	14th Thu	15th Fri	16th Sat	17th Sun	18th Mon	19th Tue	20th Wed	21st Thu	22nd Fri	23rd Sat	24th Sun	Events

=== Records ===
125 Olympic records including 37 world records were set in various events at the Games. In swimming, sixty-five Olympic swimming records including 25 world records were broken because of the use of the LZR Racer, a specialized swimming suit developed by NASA and the Australian Institute of Sport. Only two swimming Olympic records remained intact after the Games.

=== Opening ceremony ===
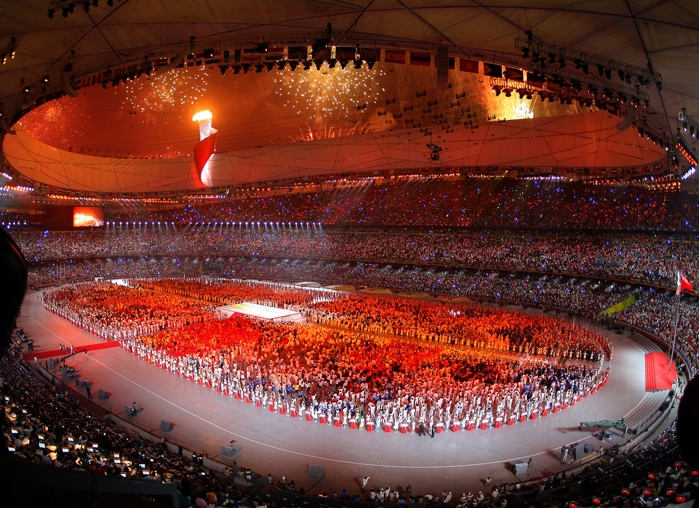
Opening Ceremony.

Before the event started, the People's Liberation Army Navy Band performed the Welcome March song as delegations of both IOC and the Chinese government, led by Jacques Rogge and Hu Jintao, entered Beijing National Stadium (The Bird's Nest). The opening ceremony officially began at 8:00 pm China Standard Time (UTC+8) on 8 August 2008. The number 8 is associated with prosperity and confidence in Chinese culture, and the ceremonial start comprised a triple eight for the date and one extra for time (close to 08:08:08 pm). The ceremony was co-directed by Chinese filmmaker Zhang Yimou and Chinese choreographer Zhang Jigang and featured a cast of over 15,000 performers. The ceremony lasted over four hours and was reported to have cost over US$100 million to produce. UNGA President Miguel d'Escoto and leaders from 105 countries and territories attended this ceremony.

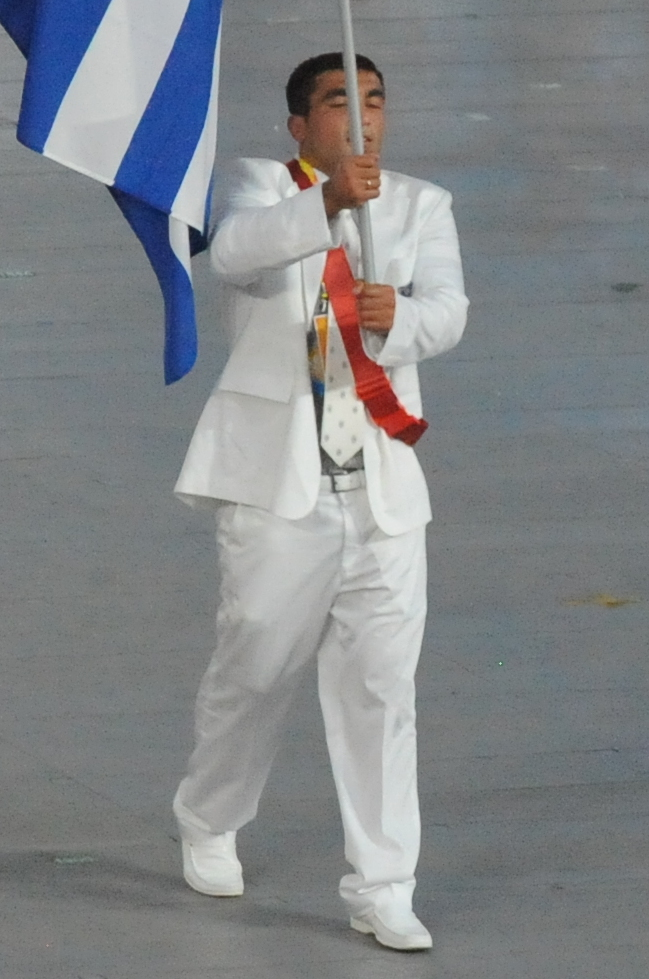
Ilias Iliadis led the Greek team into the Bird's Nest as the traditional first contingent.

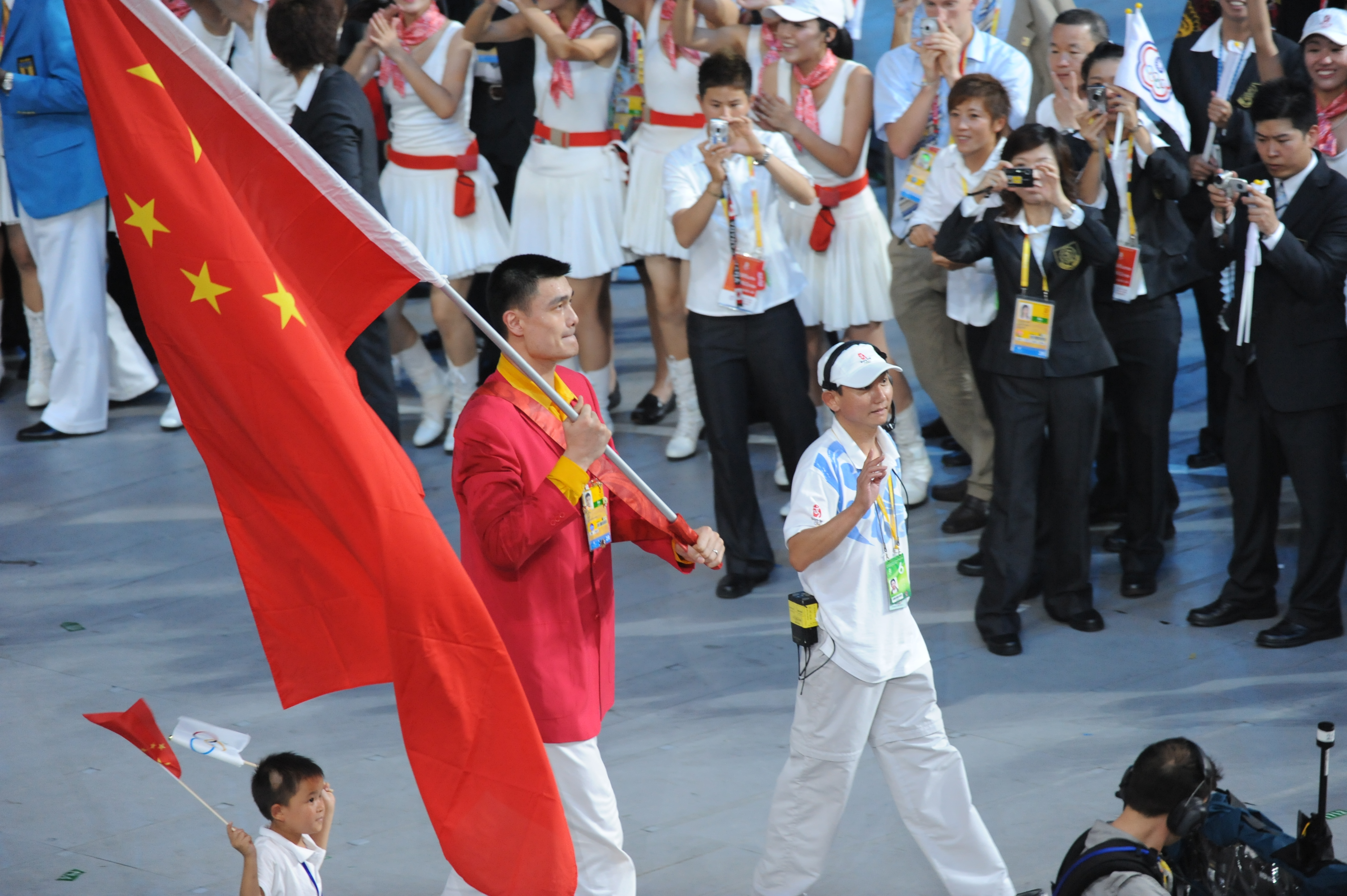
Yao Ming and Lin Hao led the host country. China, as the host, enters last among 204 nations with a large vast of participants joining the parade.

A rich showcase of ancient Chinese art and culture dominated the ceremony cultural segments. It opened with the beating of Fou drums for the countdown. Subsequently, a giant scroll was unveiled and became the show's centerpiece. The official song of the 2008 Summer Olympics, titled "You and Me", was performed by Britain's Sarah Brightman and China's Liu Huan, on a large spinning rendition of the globe. As the Olympic Charter determines the parade of nations section, is led by the Greek team, which hosted the previous games, entered first in honour of its status as the Olympic birthplace. They were led by judoka Ilias Iliadis. Meanwhile, the Chinese team entered last as the host country, led by the NBA's Houston Rockets superstar Yao Ming and earthquake survivor Lin Hao, who was just 9 years old. The last torchbearer in the Olympic Torch was the gymnast legend Li Ning ignited the cauldron, after being suspended into the air by wires and completing the relay last 400m of the National Stadium at roof height.

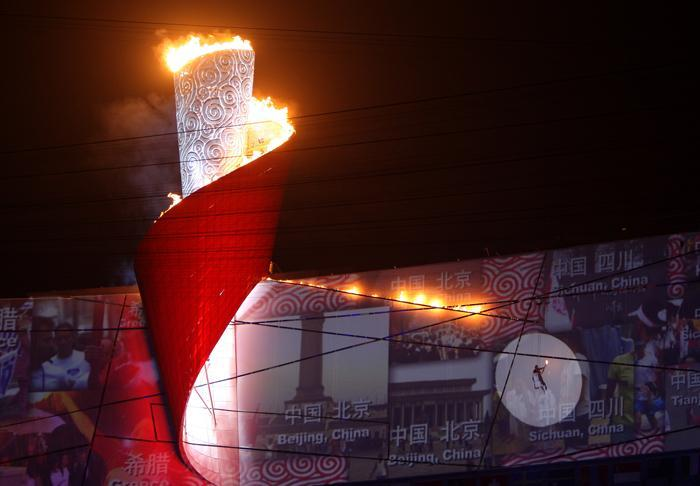
The lighting of the Olympic Cauldron.

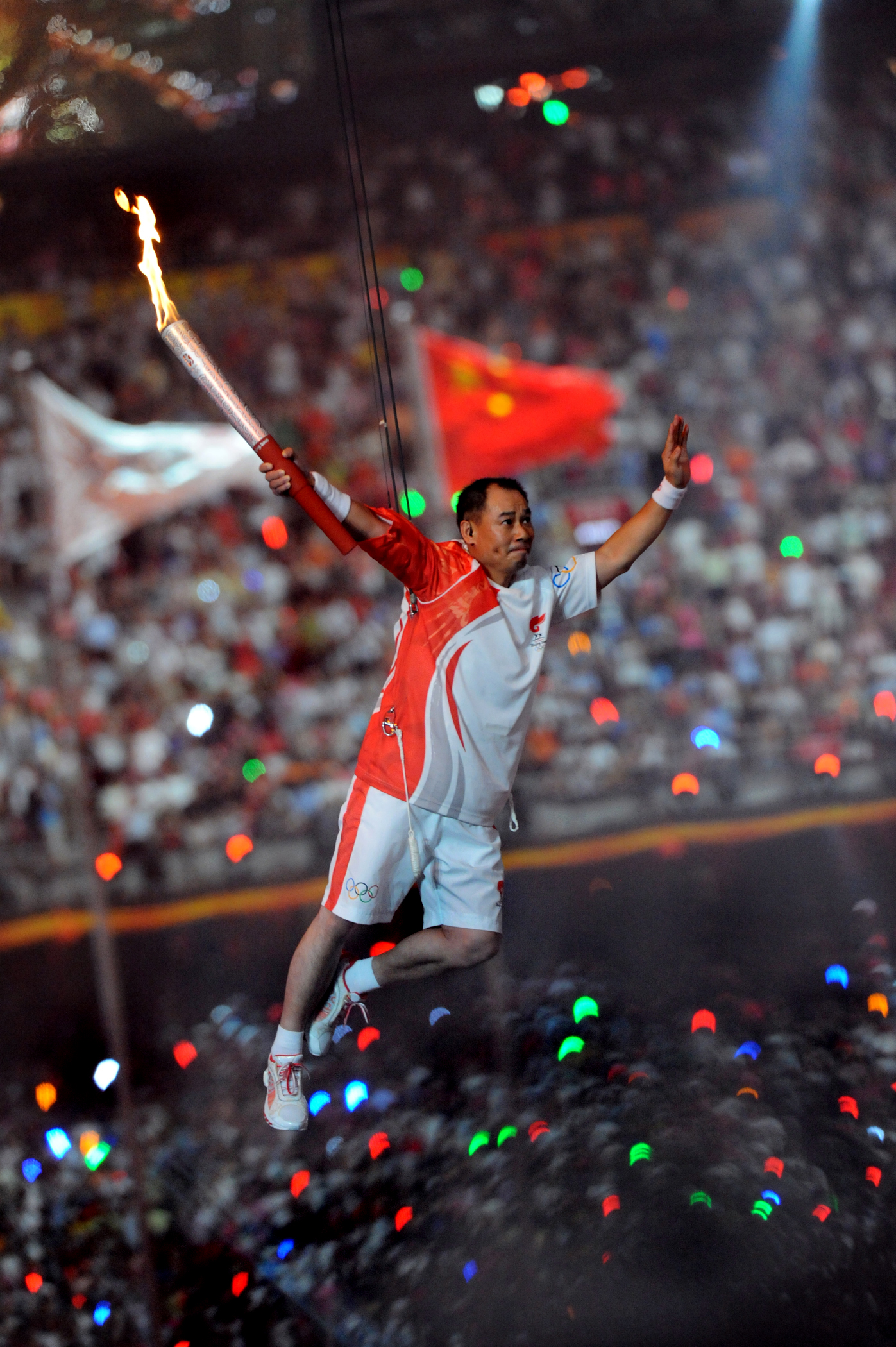
Chinese gymnast Li Ning after igniting the cauldron.

The opening ceremony was lauded by spectators and various international presses as "spectacular" and "spellbinding". Hein Verbruggen, chairman of the IOC Coordination Commission for the XXIX Olympiad, called the ceremony "a grand, unprecedented success."

=== Closing ceremony ===
The 2008 Summer Olympics closing ceremony concluded the Beijing Games on 24 August 2008. It began at 8:00 pm China Standard Time (UTC+8) and took place at the Beijing National Stadium.

The ceremony included the handover of the Games from Beijing to London. Guo Jinlong, the Mayor of Beijing handed over the Olympic flag to the Mayor of London Boris Johnson, followed by a performance organized by London Organising Committee of the Olympic and Paralympic Games. This presentation included performances by guitarist Jimmy Page and recording artist Leona Lewis. Footballer David Beckham was also featured during London's presentation.

== Medal table ==
The reverse side of the medals of the 2008 Summer Olympics: silver (left), gold (center), bronze (right). Each medal has a ring of jade.

Of the 204 nations that participated in the 2008 Games, 87 earned medals and 54 of those won at least one gold medal, both of these figures setting new records for Olympic Games. There were 117 participating countries that did not win any medals. Athletes from China won the highest number of gold medals of any nation at these Games, with 48, thus making China the seventh nation to rank top in the medal table in the history of the modern Olympics, along with the United States (fifteen times), France (in 1900), Great Britain (in 1908), Germany (in 1936), the Soviet Union (six times), and the Unified Team (in 1992).

The United States team won the most medals overall, with 112. Afghanistan, Mauritius, Sudan, Tajikistan and Togo won their first Olympic medals. Mongolia (which previously held the record for most medals without a gold) and Panama won their first gold medals. Four members of the water polo team from Serbia won the first medal for their country under its new name, having previously won medals representing Yugoslavia and Serbia and Montenegro.

American swimmer Michael Phelps won a total of eight gold medals, more than any other athlete in a single Olympic Games, setting numerous world and Olympic records in the process. Jamaican sprinter Usain Bolt also set records in several different events, completing the 100m final with a time of 9.69 seconds, beating his own previous world record. Gymnast Nastia Liukin won the all-around gold medal in artistic gymnastics, becoming the third American female to do so, following in the footsteps of Mary Lou Retton in 1984 and Carly Patterson in 2004.

These are the top ten nations that won medals in the 2008 Games

‡ Changes in medal standings (see here).

* Host nation (China)

2008 Summer Olympics medal table (Note: Figures in table reflect all official changes in medal standings.)
Rank	NOC	Gold	Silver	Bronze	Total
1	China*‡	48	22	30	100
2	United States‡	36	39	37	112
3	Russia‡	24	13	23	60
4	Great Britain‡	19	13	19	51
5	Germany‡	16	11	14	41
6	Australia	14	15	17	46
7	South Korea‡	13	11	8	32
8	Japan‡	9	8	8	25
9	Italy‡	8	9	10	27
10	France‡	7	16	20	43
11–87	Remaining NOCs	108	146	167	421
Totals (87 entries)		302	303	353	958

=== Podium sweeps ===
Date	Sport	Event	NOC	Gold	Silver	Bronze
9 August	Fencing	Women's sabre	United States	Mariel Zagunis	Sada Jacobson	Rebecca Ward
17 August	Athletics	Women's 100 meters	Jamaica	Shelly-Ann Fraser	Sherone Simpson; Kerron Stewart	Not awarded
17 August	Tennis	Women's singles	Russia	Elena Dementieva	Dinara Safina	Vera Zvonareva
18 August	Athletics	Men's 400 meters hurdles	United States	Angelo Taylor	Kerron Clement	Bershawn Jackson
21 August	Athletics	Men's 400 meters	United States	LaShawn Merritt	Jeremy Wariner	David Neville
22 August	Table tennis	Women's singles	China	Zhang Yining	Wang Nan	Guo Yue
23 August	Table tennis	Men's singles	China	Ma Lin	Wang Hao	Wang Liqin

== Concerns and controversies ==
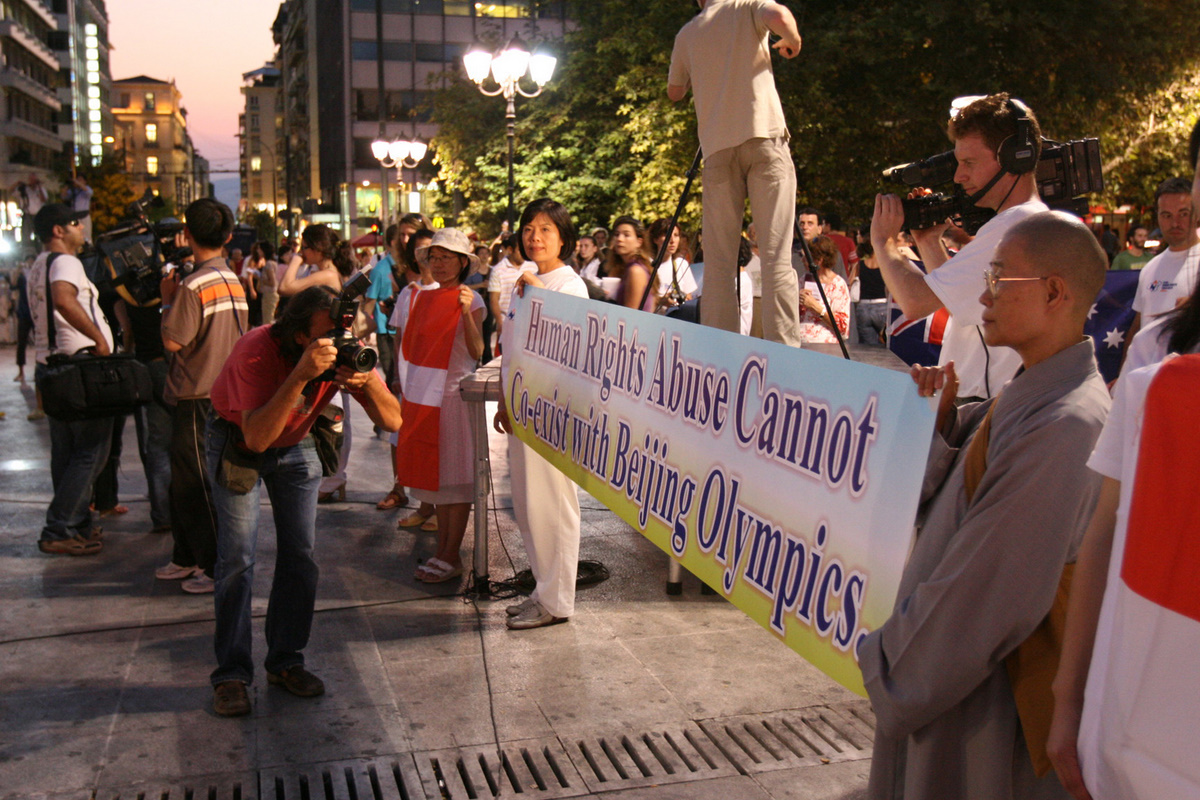
The banner reads: "Human Rights Abuse Cannot Co-exist with Beijing Olympics", picture taken during the opening of the Human Rights Torch Relay event

A variety of concerns over the Games, or China's hosting of the Games, had been expressed by various entities, including claims that China violated its pledge to allow open media access, various claims of human rights violations, its alleged continuous support of repressive regimes (such as Zimbabwe, Myanmar, Sudan, and North Korea), air pollution in both the city of Beijing and environs, proposed boycotts, warnings of the possibility that the Beijing Olympics could be targeted by terrorist groups, disruption from Tibetan autonomy protesters, and religious persecutions.

There were also claims that several members of China's women's gymnastics team, including double gold medal winner He Kexin, were too young to compete under the International Gymnastics Federation's rules for Olympic eligibility, but all were exonerated after an official IOC investigation.

Collectively, the Beijing Olympics are associated with a variety of problematic topics: the ecological impact, residential displacement due to construction, treatment of migrant workers, the government's political stance on Tibet, etc. In the lead-up to the Olympics, the government allegedly issued guidelines to the local media for their reporting during the Games: most political issues not directly related to the Olympics were to be downplayed; topics such as pro-Tibetan independence and East Turkestan movements were not to be reported on, as were food safety issues such as "cancer-causing mineral water". As the 2008 Chinese milk scandal broke in September 2008, there was widespread speculation that China's desire for a perfect Games may have been a factor contributing towards the delayed recall of contaminated infant formula.

The 2008 Olympics were hit by a number of doping scandals before and after the Games had commenced. Since seven Russian track and field stars were suspended just before the start of the Games for allegedly tampering with their urine samples, only five of the seven who were due to take part could participate. Eleven Greek weightlifters also failed tests in the run up to the Games and the entire Bulgarian weightlifting team had to withdraw after eleven of their weightlifters also failed tests. A small number of athletes from other nations also failed pre-Games tests.

== Legacy ==
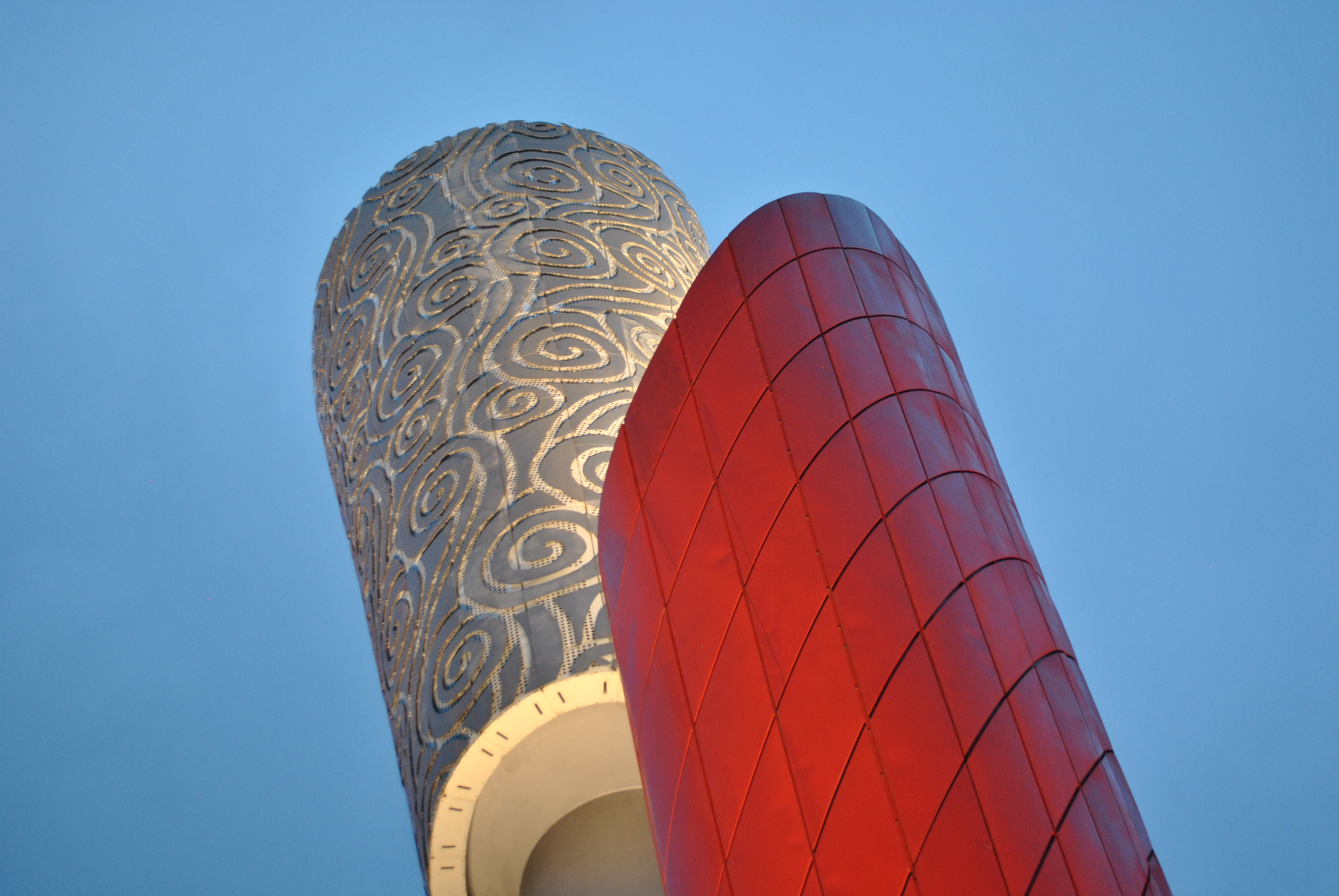
Beijing 2008 cauldron in 2013

The 2008 Summer Olympics have been generally accepted by the world's media as a logistical success. Many of the worst fears about the Games failed to materialize: no terrorists struck Beijing; no athlete protested at the podium (though Swedish wrestler Ara Abrahamian tossed his bronze medal in disgust over judging); and the air quality, despite being the worst in Olympics history, was not as bad as many had feared beforehand – due largely to favorable weather patterns.

Many in China viewed the Olympics as "an affirmation of a single nationalistic dream" and saw protests during the international torch relay as an insult to China. The Games also bolstered domestic support for the Chinese government, and for the policies of the Communist Party, giving rise to concerns that the Olympics would give the state more leverage to suppress political dissent, at least temporarily. Efforts to quell any unrest before and during the Games also contributed to a rapid expansion in the size and political clout of China's internal security forces, and this growth continued through the following years. Reports also indicated that the Olympics boosted the political careers of pro-Beijing politicians in Hong Kong, as many Chinese gold medal winners campaigned on behalf of the pro-Beijing DAB during the 2008 election, although any trend towards greater identification by Hong Kongers with mainland China appears to have been short-lived.

Some sectors of the Beijing economy may have benefited from the influx of tourists. Other sectors such as manufacturing lost revenue because of plant closings related to the government's efforts to improve air quality. Four years after the Games, many of the specially constructed facilities were underused or even deserted.

Beijing benefitted from new infrastructure, environmental upgrades, development of public spaces, improved transportation, and improved communications systems.

== See also ==
- 2008 Summer Paralympics – Multi-parasport event in Beijing, China
- Olympic Games held in China
  - 2014 Summer Youth Olympics – Multi-sport event in Nanjing, China
  - 2022 Winter Olympics – Multi-sport event in Beijing, China
- List of IOC country codes – Standard identifiers for Olympic teams
- Doping at the Olympic Games – 2008 Beijing – Use of banned drugs at the Olympics

== Notes ==
Summer Olympics
Preceded by Athens	XXIX Olympiad; Beijing; 2008	Succeeded by London
