= Dancing Beijing =

Official emblem of the 2008 Summer Olympics

- Simplified Chinese: 舞动的北京
- Traditional Chinese: 舞動的北京
Transcriptions
Standard Mandarin
- Hanyu Pinyin: Wǔdòng de Beíjīng
Yue: Cantonese
- Jyutping: mou5 dung6 dik1 bak1 ging1

Dancing Beijing is the name of the official emblem of the 2008 Summer Olympics, which took place in Beijing in the People's Republic of China. It was unveiled on 3 August 2003 in a ceremony attended by 2,008 people at Beijing's Temple of Heaven.

== Description ==
The emblem draws on various elements of Chinese culture, depicting a traditional red Chinese seal above the words "Beijing 2008" and the Olympic rings. The seal is inscribed with a stylised calligraphic rendition of the Chinese character 京 (jīng, meaning 'capital', from the name of the host city) in the form of a dancing figure. The curves are also claimed to suggest the body of a wriggling Chinese dragon. The open arms of the figure symbolise the invitation of China to the world to share in its culture. The figure also resembles that of a runner crossing the finish line. Red, the dominant colour of the emblem, is an important colour in Chinese society, often signifying prosperity.

== Design ==
The logo was created by Guo Chunning (郭春宁), the vice-president of the "Beijing Armstrong International Corporate Identity" (AICI). There was only one seal among the 1,985 entries contributed by designers from China and overseas. Other entries included dozens of Great Walls, pandas and dragons. Other designers include Zhang Wu (张武).

== Unveiling ceremony ==
International Olympic Committee President Jacques Rogge delivered an address at the unveiling ceremony on 3 August 2003 saying, "Your new emblem immediately conveys the awesome beauty and power of China which are embodied in your heritage and your people." Rogge continued, "In this emblem, I saw the promise and potential of a New Beijing and a Great Olympics. This is a milestone in the history of your Olympic quest. As this new emblem becomes known around the world and, as it takes its place at the centre of your Games, we are confident that it will achieve the stature of one of the best and most meaningful symbols in Olympic history." The ceremony was delayed by several months because of the SARS outbreak in 2003.
