= Keith Sanderson (sport shooter) =

American sport shooter

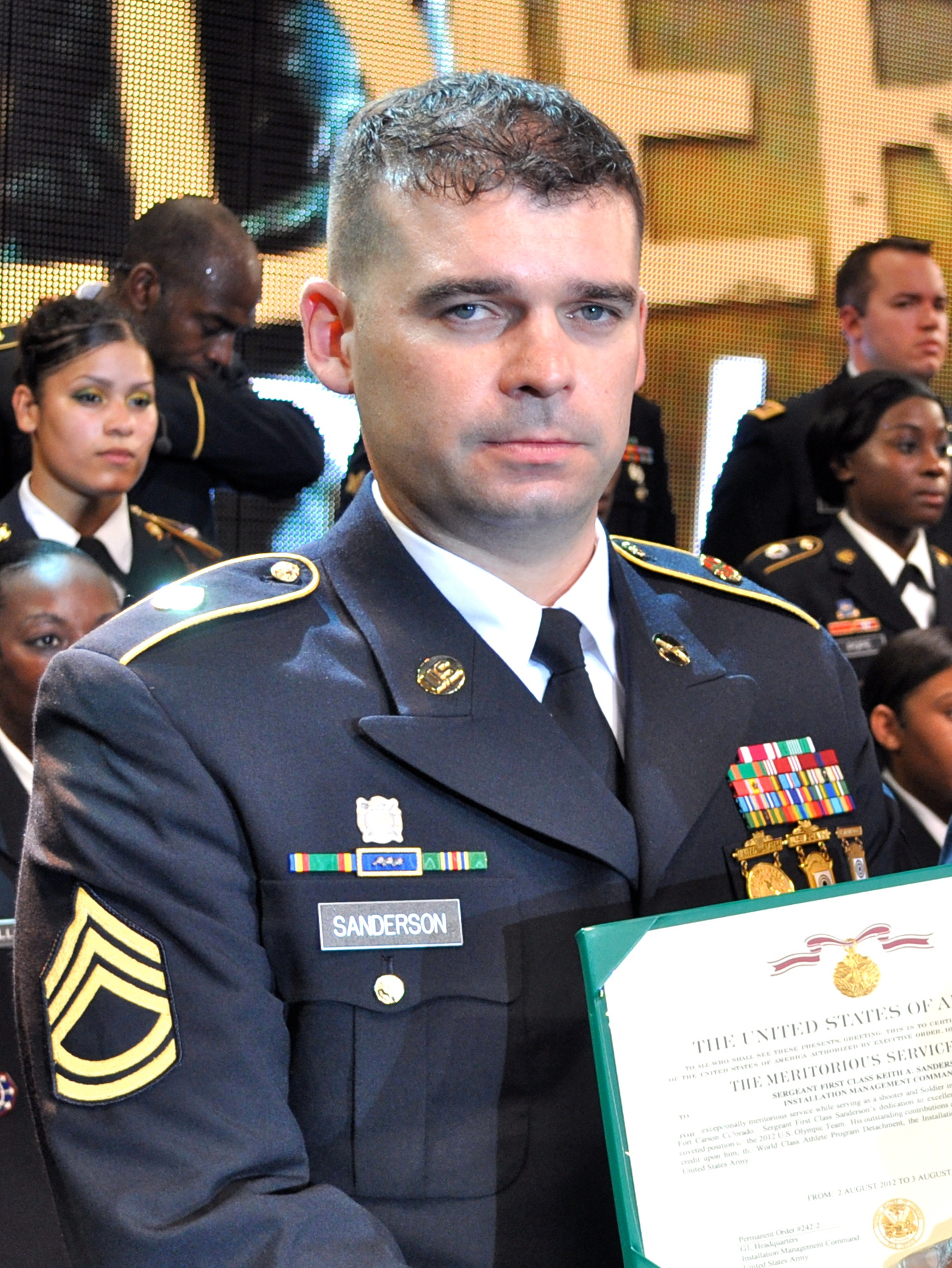
- Keith Sanderson in 2012

Personal information
- Born: February 2, 1975 (age 51) Plymouth, Massachusetts, U.S.
- Height: 1.83 m (6 ft 0 in)
- Weight: 95 kg (209 lb)

Sport
- Sport: Shooting
- Club: U.S. Army Marksmanship Unit; U.S. Army WCAP
Medal record
Representing the United States
Pan American Games
Silver medal – second place	2007 Rio de Janeiro	25 m rapid fire pistol

Keith Sanderson (born February 2, 1975) is an American sport shooter who holds the Olympic record for the qualification round of 25 meter rapid fire pistol (583 points, set in 2008). After winning the qualification round, he fell back during the final and finished fifth, the same position he had reached in the 2006 World Championships. He has four medals from ISSF World Cups: a bronze from Munich 2007, a gold from Beijing 2009, where he defeated Vijay Kumar by 0.1 point in the final, another bronze from Munich 2009, and the gold from Fort Benning, Georgia where he won by 7 shots.

On the continental level, Sanderson has been successful in other events as well. At the Championship of the Americas held in Salinas, Puerto Rico in 2005, he won gold in 25 meter center-fire pistol and bronze in both 50 meter pistol and 25 meter standard pistol. He failed to place in rapid fire, but two years later, at the 2007 Pan American Games in Rio de Janeiro, he won the silver medal, defeated only by Cuba's Leuris Pupo.

Sanderson did not compete in the Tokyo Olympics in 2021, having been suspended by the United States Center for SafeSport.

== SafeSport suspension ==
Sanderson was suspended by the U.S. Center for SafeSport for violations of the Athlete Code of Conduct and violations of the SafeSport policy, which included sexual misconduct. He was therefore prevented from competing in the Tokyo Olympics in 2021. Sanderson was previously suspended by USA Shooting in 2018, to which he responded by claiming the action was driven by the organization's desire to punish him for his criticism of the United States Olympic & Paralympic Committee.
