= Guo Chunning =

Chinese graphic designer (born 1958)

- Simplified Chinese: 郭春宁
- Traditional Chinese: 郭春寧
Transcriptions
Standard Mandarin
- Hanyu Pinyin: Guō Chūnníng

Guo Chunning (born 1958) is a Chinese graphic designer and the vice president of the Beijing Armstrong International Corporate Identity (AICI). He is internationally known for designing Dancing Beijing, the official emblem of the 2008 Summer Olympics, held in Beijing in the People's Republic of China.

== Information ==
Guo was born in 1958 in the city of Shenyang in Liaoning province in Northeast China. Since 1975, he studied art design at Tianjin Arts and Crafts School (天津工艺美术学校). In 1980, he was accepted to study commercial art at Decoration Department of Central Academy of Arts and Crafts (中央工艺美术学院) which is now Academy of Arts & Design of Tsinghua University. Upon his graduation from the school in 1984, Guo worked at advertisement department of China Daily until 1988 to establish Beijing Shichuang International Design Co., Ltd (北京始创国际企划有限公司) In 2002, his logo design based on Chinese seal was selected among the 1,985 entires contributed by about 1300 designers from China and overseas.

== See also ==
- Zhang Jigang
