= World and Olympic records set at the 2008 Summer Olympics =

The 2008 Summer Olympics in Beijing saw more World records broken than any Olympic Games before. Numerous new Olympic records were further set.

== Archery ==
Event	Date	Record	Round	Name	Nationality	Score	Record
Women's team	9 August	216 arrow ranking round	Ranking Round	Park Sung-hyun; Yun Ok-Hee; Joo Hyun-Jung	South Korea	2004	OR
Women's team	10 August	24 arrow match	First Round	Natalia Valeeva; Pia Carmen Maria Lionetti; Elena Tonetta	Italy	215	OR
Women's team	10 August	24 arrow match	Quarterfinals	Bérengère Schuh; Sophie Dodemont; Virginie Arnold	France	218	OR
Women's team	10 August	24 arrow match	Quarterfinals	Park Sung-hyun; Yun Ok-Hee; Joo Hyun-Jung	South Korea	231	WR, OR
Women's individual	14 August	12 arrow match	Round of 16	Park Sung-hyun	South Korea	115	OR
Men's team	11 August	24 arrow match	First Round	Rafał Dobrowolski; Piotr Piątek; Jacek Proć	Poland	223	OR
Men's team	11 August	24 arrow match	Quarterfinal	Im Dong-Hyun; Lee Chang-Hwan; Park Kyung-Mo	South Korea	224	OR
Men's team	11 August	24 arrow match	Final	Im Dong-Hyun; Lee Chang-Hwan; Park Kyung-Mo	South Korea	227	OR
Men's individual	13 August	12 arrow match	Round of 64	Jacek Proc	Poland	116	OR
Men's individual	13 August	12 arrow match	Round of 32	Lee Chang-hwan	South Korea	117	OR

== Track & Field ==
=== Men's records ===
Event	Record	Name	Nation	Date	Record
Men's 100 metres	9.69 s	Usain Bolt	Jamaica	16 August 2008	WR, OR
Men's 200 metres	19.30 s	Usain Bolt	Jamaica	20 August 2008	WR, OR
Men's 5000 metres	12:57.82 min	Kenenisa Bekele	Ethiopia	23 August 2008	OR
Men's 10000 metres	27:01.17 min	Kenenisa Bekele	Ethiopia	17 August 2008	OR
Men's 4x400 metre relay	2:55.39 min	LaShawn Merritt; Angelo Taylor; David Neville; Jeremy Wariner	United States	23 August 2008	OR
Men's marathon	2:06:32 hr	Samuel Kamau Wanjiru	Kenya	24 August 2008	OR
Men's 50 kilometre walk	3:37:09	Alex Schwazer	Italy	22 August 2008	OR
Men's pole vault	5.96 m	Steven Hooker	Australia	22 August 2008	OR
Men's javelin throw	90.57 m	Andreas Thorkildsen	Norway	23 August 2008	OR

=== Women's records ===
Event	Record	Name	Nation	Date	Record
Women's 400 metre hurdles	52.64 s	Melaine Walker	Jamaica	20 August 2008	OR
Women's 3,000 metre steeplechase	8:58.81 min	Gulnara Galkina-Samitova	Russia	17 August 2008	WR, OR
Women's 10,000 metres	29:54.66	Tirunesh Dibaba	Ethiopia	20 August 2008	OR
Women's 20km walk	1:26:31 hr	Olga Kaniskina	Russia	20 August 2008	OR
Women's triple jump	15.39 m	Françoise Mbango Etone	Cameroon	17 August 2008	OR
Women's pole vault	5.05 m	Yelena Isinbayeva	Russia	18 August 2008	WR, OR
Women's hammer throw	76.34 m	Aksana Miankova	Belarus	20 August 2008	OR

== Cycling ==
Event	Time	Name	Nation	Date	Record
Men's Sprint	9.815	Chris Hoy	Great Britain	2008-08-17	OR
Men's Individual pursuit	4:15.031	Bradley Wiggins	Great Britain	2008-08-15	OR
Men's Team pursuit	3:53.312	Bradley Wiggins; Paul Manning; Geraint Thomas; Ed Clancy	Great Britain	2008-08-18	OR
Women's Sprint	10.963	Victoria Pendleton	Great Britain	2008-08-17	OR

== Shooting ==
=== Men's records ===
Event		Score	Name	Nation	Date	Record
25 m rapid fire pistol	Qual.	583	Keith Sanderson	United States	2008-08-16	OR
25 m rapid fire pistol	Final	780.2	Oleksandr Petriv	Ukraine	2008-08-16	OR
Trap	Final	146	David Kostelecký	Czech Republic	2008-08-10	OR
Double trap	Qual.	145	Walton Eller	United States	2008-08-12	OR
Double trap	Final	190	Walton Eller	United States	2008-08-12	OR
Skeet	Qual.	121	Vincent Hancock	United States	2008-08-16	OR
Skeet	Final	145	Vincent Hancock; Tore Brovold	United States; Norway	2008-08-16	OR

=== Women's records ===
Event		Score	Name	Nation	Date	Record
50 m rifle three positions	Qual.	589^{[b]}	Du Li	China	2008-08-14	OR
50 m rifle three positions	Final	690.3	Du Li	China	2008-08-14	OR
10 m air rifle	Qual.	400	Kateřina Emmons	Czech Republic	2008-08-09	WR, OR
10 m air rifle	Final	503.5	Kateřina Emmons	Czech Republic	2008-08-09	OR
25 m pistol	Qual.	590^{[c]}	Otryadyn Gündegmaa	Mongolia	2008-08-13	OR
25 m pistol	Final	793.4	Chen Ying	China	2008-08-13	OR
10 m air pistol	Qual.	391	Natalia Paderina	Russia	2008-08-10	OR
10 m air pistol	Final	492.3	Guo Wenjun	China	2008-08-10	OR
Trap	Final	91	Satu Mäkelä-Nummela	Finland	2008-08-11	OR
Skeet	Qual.	72	Chiara Cainero	Italy	2008-08-14	OR
Skeet	Final	93	Chiara Cainero; Kim Rhode; Christine Brinker	Italy; United States; Germany	2008-08-14	OR

- ^{b} This equalled Renata Mauer's Olympic record.
- ^{c} This equalled Tao Luna's Olympic record.

== Swimming ==
Due to the use of the LZR Racer, a specialised swimming suit developed by NASA and the Australian Institute of Sport, many records were broken. New world records were set 25 times (affecting 23 distinct world records) and new Olympic records were set 65 times and one other was equalled (affecting 30 distinct Olympic records). Only Ian Thorpe's 3:40.59 in the 400 metres freestyle and Inge de Bruijn's 56.61 in the 100 metres butterfly, both set in Sydney, remained Olympic records. Michael Phelps of the United States also broke the record for the most gold medals ever won by an Olympian with a total of 14; 8 of which were won during the 2008 Summer Olympics - this was also a world record.

=== Men ===
Event	Date	Round	Name	Nationality	Time	Record	Day
Men's 100 m breaststroke	August 9	Heat 7	Alexander Dale Oen	Norway	59.41	OR	1
Men's 400 m individual medley	August 9	Heat 4	Michael Phelps	United States	4:07.82	OR	1
Men's 100 m backstroke	August 10	Heat 4	Matt Grevers	United States	53.41	OR	2
Men's 100 m breaststroke	August 10	Semifinal 2	Alexander Dale Oen	Norway	59.16	OR	2
Men's 400 m individual medley	August 10	Final	Michael Phelps	United States	4:03.84	WR	2
Men's 4 × 100 m freestyle relay	August 10	Heat 1	Nathan Adrian (48.82); Cullen Jones (47.61); Ben Wildman-Tobriner (48.03); Matt Grevers (47.77)	United States	3:12.23	WR	2
Men's 100 m freestyle	August 10	Heat 1 leadoff*	Amaury Leveaux	France	47.76	OR	2
Men's 100 m backstroke	August 11	Semifinal 1	Arkady Vyatchanin	Russia	53.06	OR	3
Men's 100 m backstroke	August 11	Semifinal 2	Hayden Stoeckel	Australia	52.97	OR	3
Men's 100 m breaststroke	August 11	Final	Kosuke Kitajima	Japan	58.91	WR	3
Men's 200 m butterfly	August 11	Heat 6	Michael Phelps	United States	1:53.70	OR	3
Men's 4 × 100 m freestyle relay	August 11	Final	Michael Phelps (47.51); Garrett Weber-Gale (47.02); Cullen Jones (47.65); Jason Lezak (46.06)	United States	3:08.24	WR	3
Men's 100 m freestyle	August 11	Final leadoff*	Eamon Sullivan	Australia	47.24	WR	3
Men's 200 m freestyle	August 12	Final	Michael Phelps	United States	1:42.96	WR	4
Men's 100 m backstroke	August 12	Final	Aaron Peirsol	United States	52.54	WR	4
Men's 200 m breaststroke	August 12	Heat 5	Paolo Bossini	Italy	2:08.98	OR	4
Men's 200 m breaststroke	August 12	Heat 7	Dániel Gyurta	Hungary	2:08.68	OR	4
Men's 200 m butterfly	August 12	Semifinal 2	Michael Phelps	United States	1:53.70	OR	4
Men's 4 × 200 m freestyle relay	August 12	Heat 2	David Walters (1:46.57); Ricky Berens (1:45.47); Erik Vendt (1:47.11); Klete Keller (1:45.51)	United States	7:04.66	OR	4
Men's 100 m freestyle	August 13	Semifinal 1	Alain Bernard	France	47.20	WR	5
Men's 100 m freestyle	August 13	Semifinal 2	Eamon Sullivan	Australia	47.05	WR	5
Men's 200 m breaststroke	August 13	Semifinal 1	Kosuke Kitajima	Japan	2:08.61	OR	5
Men's 200 m butterfly	August 13	Final	Michael Phelps	United States	1:52.03	WR	5
Men's 4 × 200 m freestyle relay	August 13	Final	Michael Phelps (1:43.31); Ryan Lochte (1:44.28); Ricky Berens (1:46.29); Peter Vanderkaay (1:44.68)	United States	6:58.56	WR	5
Men's 50 m freestyle	August 14	Heat 11	César Cielo	Brazil	21.47	OR	6
Men's 50 m freestyle	August 14	Heat 12	Amaury Leveaux	France	21.46	OR	6
Men's 100 m butterfly	August 14	Heat 7	Jason Dunford	Kenya	51.14	OR	6
Men's 100 m butterfly	August 14	Heat 9	Milorad Čavić	Serbia	50.76	OR	6
Men's 50 m freestyle	August 15	Semifinal 1	César Cielo	Brazil	21.34	OR	7
Men's 1500 m freestyle	August 15	Heat 3	Ryan Cochrane	Canada	14:40.84	OR	7
Men's 1500 m freestyle	August 15	Heat 5	Grant Hackett	Australia	14:38.92	OR	7
Men's 200 m backstroke	August 15	Final	Ryan Lochte	United States	1:53.94	WR	7
Men's 200 m individual medley	August 15	Final	Michael Phelps	United States	1:54.23	WR	7
Men's 50 m freestyle	August 16	Final	César Cielo	Brazil	21.30	OR	8
Men's 100 m butterfly	August 16	Final	Michael Phelps	United States	50.58	OR	8
Men's 4 × 100 m medley relay	August 17	Final	Aaron Peirsol (53.16); Brendan Hansen (59.27); Michael Phelps (50.15); Jason Lezak (46.76)	United States	3:29.34	WR	9

* World record split from the 4 × 100 m freestyle relay

Note: At the 4 × 100 m freestyle relay final, anchor Jason Lezak swam the fastest 100 m split (46.06); however, this is not considered an official FINA record, as he did not swim the first leg.

=== Women ===
Event	Date	Round	Name	Nationality	Time	Record	Day
Women's 400 m freestyle	August 10	Heat 5	Katie Hoff	United States	4:03.71	OR	2
Women's 400 m freestyle	August 10	Heat 6	Federica Pellegrini	Italy	4:02.19	OR	2
Women's 100 m backstroke	August 10	Heat 5	Anastasia Zuyeva	Russia	59.61	OR	2
Women's 100 m backstroke	August 10	Heat 6	Reiko Nakamura	Japan	59.36	OR	2
Women's 100 m backstroke	August 10	Heat 7	Kirsty Coventry	Zimbabwe	59.00	OR	2
Women's 100 m breaststroke	August 10	Heat 7	Leisel Jones	Australia	1:05.64	OR	2
Women's 400 m individual medley	August 10	Final	Stephanie Rice	Australia	4:29.45	WR	2
Women's 4 × 100 m freestyle relay	August 10	Final	Inge Dekker (54.37); Ranomi Kromowidjojo (53.39); Femke Heemskerk (53.42); Marleen Veldhuis (52.58)	Netherlands	3:33.76	OR	2
Women's 100 m freestyle	August 10	Final leadoff*	Britta Steffen	Germany	53.38	OR	2
Women's 200 m freestyle	August 11	Heat 4	Pang Jiaying	China	1:57.37	OR	3
Women's 200 m freestyle	August 11	Heat 5	Sara Isaković	Slovenia	1:55.86	OR	3
Women's 200 m freestyle	August 11	Heat 6	Federica Pellegrini	Italy	1:55.45	WR	3
Women's 100 m backstroke	August 11	Semifinal 2	Kirsty Coventry	Zimbabwe	58.77	WR	3
Women's 100 m breaststroke	August 12	Final	Leisel Jones	Australia	1:05.17	OR	4
Women's 200 m individual medley	August 12	Semifinal 1	Kirsty Coventry	Zimbabwe	2:09.53	OR	4
Women's 200 m freestyle	August 13	Final	Federica Pellegrini	Italy	1:54.82	WR	5
Women's 200 m breaststroke	August 13	Heat 5	Rebecca Soni	United States	2:22.17	OR	5
Women's 200 m individual medley	August 13	Final	Stephanie Rice	Australia	2:08.45	OR	5
Women's 4 × 200 m freestyle relay	August 13	Heat 1	Alena Popchanka (1:58.27); Céline Couderc (1:58.92); Camille Muffat (1:57.32); Coralie Balmy (1:55.86)	France	7:50.37	OR	5
Women's 800 m freestyle	August 14	Heat 4	Rebecca Adlington	Great Britain	8:18.06	OR	6
Women's 200 m backstroke	August 14	Heat 4	Kirsty Coventry	Zimbabwe	2:06.76	OR	6
Women's 200 m butterfly	August 14	Final	Liu Zige	China	2:04.18	WR	6
Women's 4 × 200 m freestyle relay	August 14	Final	Stephanie Rice (1:56.60); Bronte Barratt (1:56.58); Kylie Palmer (1:55.22); Linda Mackenzie (1:55.91)	Australia	7:44.31	WR	6
Women's 100 m freestyle	August 15	Final	Britta Steffen	Germany	53.12	OR	7
Women's 200 m breaststroke	August 15	Final	Rebecca Soni	United States	2:20.22	WR	7
Women's 800 m freestyle	August 16	Final	Rebecca Adlington	Great Britain	8:14.10	OR	8
Women's 200 m backstroke	August 16	Final	Kirsty Coventry	Zimbabwe	2:05.24	WR	8
Women's 50 m freestyle	August 17	Final	Britta Steffen	Germany	24.06	OR	9
Women's 4 × 100 m medley relay	August 17	Final	Emily Seebohm (59.33); Leisel Jones (1:04.58); Jessicah Schipper (56.25); Lisbeth Trickett (52.53)	Australia	3:52.69	WR	9

== Weightlifting ==
=== Men's records ===
Event		Weight	Name	Nation	Date	Record
85 kg	Snatch	185.0 kg	Andrei Rybakou	Belarus	2008-08-15	OR
85 kg	Total	394.0 kg	Andrei Rybakou	Belarus	2008-08-15	WR, OR
105 kg	Snatch	200.0 kg	Andrei Aramnau	Belarus	2008-08-18	OR
105 kg	Clean and Jerk	236.0 kg	Andrei Aramnau	Belarus	2008-08-18	OR
105 kg	Total	436.0 kg	Andrei Aramnau	Belarus	2008-08-18	OR

=== Women's records ===
Event		Weight	Name	Nation	Date	Record
48 kg	Clean and Jerk	117.0 kg	Chen Xiexia	China	2008-08-09	OR
48 kg	Total	212.0 kg	Chen Xiexia	China	2008-08-09	OR
53 kg	Clean and Jerk	126.0 kg	Prapawadee Jaroenrattanatarakoon	Thailand	2008-08-10	OR
58 kg	Clean and Jerk	138.0 kg	Chen Yanqing	China	2008-08-11	OR
58 kg	Total	244.0 kg	Chen Yanqing	China	2008-08-11	OR
69 kg	Snatch	128.0 kg	Liu Chunhong	China	2008-08-13	OR
69 kg	Clean and Jerk	158.0 kg	Liu Chunhong	China	2008-08-13	OR
69 kg	Total	286.0 kg	Liu Chunhong	China	2008-08-13	WR, OR
75 kg	Snatch	128.0 kg	Cao Lei	China	2008-08-15	OR
75 kg	Clean and Jerk	154.0 kg	Cao Lei	China	2008-08-15	OR
75 kg	Total	282.0 kg	Cao Lei	China	2008-08-15	OR
+75 kg	Snatch	140.0 kg	Jang Mi-Ran	South Korea	2008-08-16	WR, OR
+75 kg	Clean and Jerk	186.0 kg	Jang Mi-Ran	South Korea	2008-08-16	WR, OR
+75 kg	Total	326.0 kg	Jang Mi-Ran	South Korea	2008-08-16	WR, OR
