= Becky McCumber =

American sport shooter

Personal information
- Born: Rebecca Stutzman; 1956 (age 69–70) Peoria, Illinois, USA

Sport
- Country: USA
- Sport: Skeet shooting

Becky Stutzman McCumber (born Rebecca Stutzman, 1956) is a champion in the sport of skeet shooting. She won over thirty-five world skeet shooting championships, with her first in 1983. She also set two world records, hitting 1,183 consecutive targets in the 12-gauge ladies division and 259 straight in the long run doubles division for ladies.

== Early life ==
Becky began shooting at the Peoria Skeet and Trap Club. Reflecting on her beginning, she said, "I was pretty much raised in this gun club. My father shot, his father shot, it was very natural for me to be here. One day, when I was 16, my father put a gun in my hands and I never looked back."

== Shooting career ==
Becky started shooting competitively in 1973. At the Illinois state level, Becky has won six open competition titles, including the "High Over All" championship. In 1992 she won the Zone 5 Doubles Championship and made the Illinois state team numerous times over the years.

At the national level, Becky has two Open Mini World titles and broke a 400x400 in the Mini in 1999. In the main events that year, Becky broke a 647x650. She has captured numerous Ladies State and National titles along the way. Becky has been named to the Ladies All American team as Captain eight times and made the team consecutive years for decades beginning in 1983. She currently holds two world records, the ladies Long Run World Record for Doubles at 259 straight established in 1997 and the Ladies Long Run World Record for 12 gauge at 1183 straight established in 2000–2001. Becky has shot 13 career 100 straights in the 410. In 2012, at the Poco Loco (an all 410 shoot), she broke a 397x400 to win HOA RU for the shoot.

In a 2013 interview Becky noted, "I have been in the game so long, I've been at the top. Now you have the young, up and coming girl shooters. I guess in my mind I still want to dominate them." By 2014 she had amassed 229,200 registered skeet targets.

== Honors ==
Becky was inducted into the Illinois Skeet Shooting Association Hall of Fame in 1995 and the National Skeet Shooting Hall of Fame in 2003.
