= 2010 Archery World Cup =

International archery competition

The 2010 Archery World Cup was the 5th edition of the annual international archery circuit, organised by the World Archery Federation.

== Competition rules and scoring ==
The compound legs consisted of a 50m qualification round of 72 arrows, followed by the compound round at 50m on a 6-zone target face, using cumulative scoring for all individual, team and mixed competitions. The top seven individual performers (with no more than two from each country,) plus one host nation representative if not already qualified, proceeded to the finals; the top mixed team performer proceeded to face the host nation at the finals, which were the same competition format as the legs. The team competition was not competed at the finals.

The recurve legs consisted of a FITA qualification round, followed by a 72m Olympic set system. The top seven individual performers (with no more than two from each country), plus one host nation representative if not already qualified, proceeded to the finals; the top mixed team performer proceeded to face the host nation at the finals, which were the same competition format as the legs. The team competition was not competed at the finals.

Competitors' top three scores go towards qualification. The scores awarded in the legs were as follows:

=== Individual scoring ===
Position	Points
1st place	25
2nd place	21
3rd place	18
4th place	15
5th place	13
6th place	12
7th place	11
8th place	10
9th–16th place	5

=== Mixed team scoring ===
Position	Points
1st place	16
2nd place	12
3rd place	10
4th place	8
5th place	4
6th place	3
7th place	2
8th place	1

== Calendar ==
Stage	Location
1	Poreč, Croatia
2	Antalya Centennial Archery Field, Antalya, Turkey
3	Ogden, United States
4	Shanghai, China
Final	Edinburgh, United Kingdom

== Results ==
=== Recurve ===
==== Men's individual ====
Stage	Date	Location	1st place, gold medalist(s)	2nd place, silver medalist(s)	3rd place, bronze medalist(s)	Ref.
1	8 May	(Croatia) Poreč	(United States) Brady Ellison	(United States) Victor Wunderle	(United Kingdom) Simon Terry	
2	11 June	(Turkey) Antalya	(China) Jing Xiangqing	(Italy) Michele Frangilli	(United States) Brady Ellison	
3	7 August	(United States) Ogden	(South Korea) Kim Woo-jin	(South Korea) Oh Jin-hyek	(South Korea) Im Dong-hyun	
4	4 September	(China) Shanghai	(South Korea) Im Dong-hyun	(South Korea) Lee Chang-hwan	(India) Jayanta Talukdar	
Final	19 September	(Turkey) Istanbul	(United States) Brady Ellison	(South Korea) Im Dong-hyun	(India) Jayanta Talukdar	

==== Women's individual ====
Stage	Date	Location	1st place, gold medalist(s)	2nd place, silver medalist(s)	3rd place, bronze medalist(s)	Ref.
1	8 May	(Croatia) Poreč	(Belgium) Sabina Struyf	(Belarus) Elena Kuznetsova	(France) Bérengère Schuh	
2	11 June	(Turkey) Antalya	(Ukraine) Victoriya Koval	(Russia) Inna Stepanova	(Russia) Ksenia Perova	
3	7 August	(United States) Ogden	(South Korea) Kim Moon-jung	(South Korea) Ki Bo-bae	(South Korea) Yun Ok-hee	
4	4 September	(China) Shanghai	(South Korea) Ki Bo-bae	(India) Deepika Kumari	(South Korea) Yun Ok-hee	
Final	18 September	(Turkey) Istanbul	(South Korea) Yun Ok-hee	(Ukraine) Victoriya Koval	(South Korea) Ki Bo-bae	

==== Men's team ====
Stage	Date	Location	1st place, gold medalist(s)	2nd place, silver medalist(s)	3rd place, bronze medalist(s)	Ref.
1	8 May	(Croatia) Poreč	Italy	India	China	
2	10 June	(Turkey) Antalya	India	United States	Japan	
3	7 August	(United States) Ogden	United States	China	South Korea	
4	4 September	(China) Shanghai	India	Japan	South Korea	

==== Women's team ====
Stage	Date	Location	1st place, gold medalist(s)	2nd place, silver medalist(s)	3rd place, bronze medalist(s)	Ref.
1	8 May	(Croatia) Poreč	Ukraine	Belarus	China	
2	10 June	(Turkey) Antalya	China	Russia	United States	
3	7 August	(United States) Ogden	South Korea	India	China	
4	4 September	(China) Shanghai	South Korea	China	Chinese Taipei	

==== Mixed team ====
Stage	Date	Location	1st place, gold medalist(s)	2nd place, silver medalist(s)	3rd place, bronze medalist(s)	Ref.
1	8 May	(Croatia) Poreč	United States	China	Italy	
2	10 June	(Turkey) Antalya	China	United States	France	
3	7 August	(United States) Ogden	South Korea	United Kingdom	Italy	
4	4 September	(China) Shanghai	South Korea	United States	Ukraine	
Final	18 September	(Turkey) Istanbul	United States	United Kingdom	—N/a	

=== Compound ===
==== Men's individual ====
Stage	Date	Location	1st place, gold medalist(s)	2nd place, silver medalist(s)	3rd place, bronze medalist(s)	Ref.
1	8 May	(Croatia) Poreč	(Belgium) Sam Kyritsoglou	(Italy) Sergio Pagni	(United States) Reo Wilde	
2	11 June	(Turkey) Antalya	(Denmark) Martin Damsbo	(United States) Braden Gellenthien	(Lithuania) Vladas Šigauskas	
3	7 August	(United States) Ogden	(United States) Braden Gellenthien	(El Salvador) Jorge Jiménez	(United States) Rodger Willett Jr.	
4	4 September	(China) Shanghai	(New Zealand) Shaun Teasdale	(South Africa) Koos De Wet	(El Salvador) Jorge Jiménez	
Final	18 September	(Turkey) Istanbul	(Italy) Sergio Pagni	(United States) Braden Gellenthien	(United States) Rodger Willett Jr.	

==== Women's individual ====
Stage	Date	Location	1st place, gold medalist(s)	2nd place, silver medalist(s)	3rd place, bronze medalist(s)	Ref.
1	8 May	(Croatia) Poreč	(Canada) Ashley Wallace	(United Kingdom) Nicky Hunt	(France) Sandrine Vandionant	
2	11 June	(Turkey) Antalya	(United States) Erika Anschutz	(United Kingdom) Nicky Hunt	(Canada) Ashley Wallace	
3	7 August	(United States) Ogden	(France) Sandrine Vandionant	(Canada) Doris Jones	(United States) Jamie Van Natta	
4	4 September	(China) Shanghai	(United Kingdom) Nicky Hunt	(Mexico) Linda Ochoa	(United States) Erika Anschutz	
Final	19 September	(Turkey) Istanbul	(Russia) Albina Loginova	(Canada) Ashley Wallace	(United States) Erika Anschutz	

==== Men's team ====
Stage	Date	Location	1st place, gold medalist(s)	2nd place, silver medalist(s)	3rd place, bronze medalist(s)	Ref.
1	8 May	(Croatia) Poreč	United States	Denmark	El Salvador	
2	10 June	(Turkey) Antalya	South Africa	United States	United Kingdom	
3	7 August	(United States) Ogden	United States	Canada	El Salvador	
4	4 September	(China) Shanghai	Australia	United Kingdom	United States	

==== Women's team ====
Stage	Date	Location	1st place, gold medalist(s)	2nd place, silver medalist(s)	3rd place, bronze medalist(s)	Ref.
1	8 May	(Croatia) Poreč	Russia	United States	Mexico	
2	10 June	(Turkey) Antalya	Russia	Iran	Mexico	
3	7 August	(United States) Ogden	United States	Canada	Australia	
4	4 September	(China) Shanghai	United States	Russia	United Kingdom	

==== Mixed team ====
Stage	Date	Location	1st place, gold medalist(s)	2nd place, silver medalist(s)	3rd place, bronze medalist(s)	Ref.
1	8 May	(Croatia) Poreč	Canada	Denmark	United States	
2	10 June	(Turkey) Antalya	Mexico	Denmark	United States	
3	7 August	(United States) Ogden	Russia	United States	Denmark	
4	4 September	(China) Shanghai	Mexico	Iran	United States	
Final	19 September	(Turkey) Istanbul	United Kingdom	Mexico	—N/a	

== Medals table ==
Rank	Nation	Gold	Silver	Bronze	Total
1	United States	11	9	12	32
2	South Korea	9	4	6	19
3	Russia	4	3	1	8
4	China	3	3	3	9
5	Great Britain	2	5	3	10
6	Canada	2	4	1	7
7	India	2	3	2	7
8	Italy	2	2	2	6
8	Mexico	2	2	2	6
10	Ukraine	2	1	1	4
11	Belgium	2	0	0	2
12	Denmark	1	3	1	5
13	South Africa	1	1	0	2
14	France	1	0	3	4
15	Australia	1	0	1	2
16	New Zealand	1	0	0	1
17	Belarus	0	2	0	2
17	Iran	0	2	0	2
19	El Salvador	0	1	3	4
20	Japan	0	1	1	2
21	Chinese Taipei	0	0	1	1
21	Lithuania	0	0	1	1
Totals (22 entries)		46	46	44	136

== Qualification ==
=== Recurve ===
==== Men's individual ====
Pos.	Name	Points	(Croatia)	(Turkey)	(United States)	(China)	
1.	(United States) Brady Ellison	48	25	18	5	5	Q
2.	(South Korea) Im Dong-hyun	43	–	–	18	25	Q
3.	(South Korea) Kim Woo-jin	38	–	–	25	13	Q
4.	(Italy) Michele Frangilli	32	–	21	–	11	Q
5.	(India) Jayanta Talukdar	31	–	13	–	18	Q
6.	(Italy) Marco Galiazzo	30	5	10	5	15	Q
7.	(United Kingdom) Simon Terry	28	18	5	5	–	Q
8.	(China) Jing Xiangqing	25	–	25	–	–	
9.	(Chinese Taipei) Sung Chia-chun	23	–	–	13	10	
10.	(South Korea) Oh Jin-hyek	21	–	–	21	–	^{1}
10.	(South Korea) Lee Chang-hwan	21	–	–	–	21	^{1}
10.	(United States) Victor Wunderle	21	21	–	–	–	
10.	(Malaysia) Cheng Chu Sian	21	10	–	11	–	

^{1.} Could not qualify as national quota already reached

==== Women's individual ====
Pos.	Name	Points	(Croatia)	(Turkey)	(United States)	(China)	
1.	(South Korea) Ki Bo-bae	46	–	–	21	25	Q
2.	(Poland) Justyna Mospinek	39	15	5	13	11	Q
3.	(India) Deepika Kumari	37	–	11	5	21	Q
4.	(South Korea) Yun Ok-hee	36	–	–	18	18	Q
5.	(South Korea) Kim Moon-jung	30	–	–	25	5	^{1}
6.	(South Korea) Joo Hyun-jung	27	–	–	15	12	^{1}
7.	(Belarus) Elena Kuznetsova	26	21	5	–	–	Q
7.	(China) Guo Faping	26	13	13	–	–	^{2}
9.	(Ukraine) Victoriya Koval	25	–	25	–	–	Q
9.	(India) Dola Banerjee	25	–	15	5	5	Q
9.	(China) Zhu Shanshan	25	10	5	10	–	
9.	(Belgium) Sabrina Struyf	25	25	–	–	–	

^{1.} Could not qualify as national quota already reached
^{2.} Qualified but withdrew

==== Mixed team ====
Pos.	Team	Points	(Croatia)	(Turkey)	(United States)	(China)	
1.	United States	40	16	12	4	12	Q
2.	South Korea	32	–	–	16	16	
3.	China	29	12	16	–	1	
4.	Italy	23	10	3	10	–	
5.	Russia	18	–	8	8	2	

=== Compound ===
==== Men's individual ====
Pos.	Name	Points	(Croatia)	(Turkey)	(United States)	(China)	
1.	(United States) Braden Gellenthien	51	5	21	25	5	Q
2.	(El Salvador) Jorge Jiménez	49	–	10	21	18	Q
3.	(Denmark) Martin Damsbo	45	15	25	–	5	Q
4.	(New Zealand) Shaun Teasdale	40	–	5	10	25	Q
5.	(Canada) Dietmar Trillus	38	11	5	12	15	Q
6.	(Italy) Sergio Pagni	37	21	–	5	11	Q
7.	(United States) Rodger Willett Jr.	33	–	15	18	–	Q
8.	(United States) Reo Wilde	31	18	–	–	13	^{1}
9.	(Belgium) Sam Kyritsoglou	30	25	–	5	–	
10.	(Lithuania) Vladas Šigauskas	28	5	18	5	–	

^{1.} Could not qualify as national quota already reached

==== Women's individual ====
Pos.	Name	Points	(Croatia)	(Turkey)	(United States)	(China)	
1.	(United Kingdom) Nicky Hunt	67	21	21	5	25	Q
2.	(United States) Erika Anschutz	58	15	25	5	18	Q
3.	(Canada) Ashley Wallace	48	25	18	5	–	Q
4.	(France) Sandrine Vandionant	43	18	–	25	–	Q
5.	(Russia) Albina Loginova	41	12	13	13	15	Q
6.	(United States) Jamie van Natta	35	5	12	18	–	Q
7.	(Mexico) Linda Ochoa	31	5	5	–	21	Q
8.	(Netherlands) Irina Markovic	30	10	5	15	5	
9.	(Russia) Viktoria Balzhanova	28	–	10	5	13	
10.	(United States) Diane Watson	21	5	–	5	11	^{1}
10.	(Canada) Doris Jones	21	–	–	21	–	

^{1.} Could not qualify as national quota already reached

==== Mixed team ====
Pos.	Team	Points	(Croatia)	(Turkey)	(United States)	(China)	
1.	Mexico	35	3	16	–	16	Q
2.	Denmark	34	12	12	10	–	
3.	United States	32	10	10	12	10	
4.	Russia	18	–	1	16	1	
4.	Canada	18	16	–	2	–	

=== Nations ranking ===
Pos.	Name	Points	(Croatia)	(Turkey)	(United States)	(China)
1.	United States	842	202	241	241	158
2.	South Korea	406	–	–	210	196
3.	Russia	357	87	148	47	75
4.	China	350	87	104	96	63
5.	India	296	66	91	42	97
6.	United Kingdom	274	68	78	27	101
7.	Canada	236	52	23	141	20
8.	Italy	218	82	54	40	42
9.	Mexico	201	74	62	–	65
10.	Australia	180	15	26	74	65

== World Cup Final ==
=== Recurve ===
==== Men's individual ====
Quarterfinals
1	(United States) Brady Ellison	1	2	2	1
8	(United Kingdom) Alan Wills	1	0	0	1
5	(India) Jayanta Talukdar	1	0	2	2	1
4	(Italy) Michele Frangilli	1	2	0	0	1
3	(South Korea) Kim Woo-jin	2	1	0	1	0
6	(Italy) Marco Galiazzo	0	1	2	1	2
7	(United Kingdom) Simon Terry	1	1	1	0	0
2	(South Korea) Im Dong-hyun	1	1	1	2	2

Semifinals
1	(United States) Brady Ellison	1	0	0	2	2^{1}
5	(India) Jayanta Talukdar	1	2	2	0	0^{0}
6	(Italy) Marco Galiazzo	1	1	0	0
2	(South Korea) Im Dong-hyun	1	1	2	2

Finals
1	(United States) Brady Ellison	2	1	2	1
2	(South Korea) Im Dong-hyun	0	1	0	1
Third place
5	(India) Jayanta Talukdar	2	2	0	2
6	(Italy) Marco Galiazzo	0	0	2	0

==== Women's individual ====
Quarterfinals
1	(South Korea) Ki Bo-bae	2	0	2	1	2
8	(United Kingdom) Naomi Folkard	0	2	0	1	0
5	(Belarus) Alena Kuzniatzova	0	0	0
4	(South Korea) Yun Ok-hee	2	2	2
3	(India) Deepika Kumari	2	0	2	0	0
6	(Ukraine) Victoriya Koval	0	2	0	2	2
7	(India) Dola Banerjee	0	0	0
2	(Poland) Justyna Mospinek	2	2	2

Semifinals
1	(South Korea) Ki Bo-bae	1	0	2	2	0^{0}
4	(South Korea) Yun Ok-hee	1	2	0	0	2^{1}
6	(Ukraine) Victoriya Koval	2	2	2
2	(Poland) Justyna Mospinek	0	0	0

Finals
4	(South Korea) Yun Ok-hee	2	0	2	1	2
6	(Ukraine) Victoriya Koval	0	2	0	1	0
Third place
1	(South Korea) Ki Bo-bae	0	2	2	2
2	(Poland) Justyna Mospinek	2	0	0	0

==== Mixed team ====
Finals
1	United States; Khatuna Lorig; Jake Kaminski	138
2	United Kingdom; Naomi Folkard; Simon Terry	133

=== Compound ===
==== Men's individual ====
Quarterfinals
1	(United States) Braden Gellenthien	2	1	2	1
8	(United Kingdom) Chris White	0	1	0	1
5	(Canada) Dietmar Trillus	0	0	2	2	1^{0}
4	(New Zealand) Shaun Teasdale	2	2	0	0	1^{1}
3	(Denmark) Martin Damsbo	0	2	0	2	1^{0}
6	(Italy) Sergio Pagni	2	0	2	0	1^{1}
7	(United States) Rodger Willett Jr.	2	0	1	2	0^{1}
2	(El Salvador) Jorge Jiménez	0	2	1	0	2^{0}

Semifinals
1	(United States) Braden Gellenthien	2	0	1	2	2
4	(New Zealand) Shaun Teasdale	0	2	1	0	0
6	(Italy) Sergio Pagni	1	2	1	0	2
7	(United States) Rodger Willett Jr.	1	0	1	2	0

Finals
1	(United States) Braden Gellenthien	1	1	2	0	0
6	(Italy) Sergio Pagni	1	1	0	2	2
Third place
4	(New Zealand) Shaun Teasdale	0	2	0	0
7	(United States) Rodger Willett Jr.	2	0	2	2

==== Women's individual ====
Quarterfinals
1	(United Kingdom) Nicky Hunt	1	2	0	2	0^{0}
8	(United Kingdom) Andrea Gales	1	0	2	0	2^{1}
5	(Russia) Albina Loginova	2	2	2
4	(France) Sandrine Vandionant	0	0	0
3	(Canada) Ashley Wallace	2	2	2
6	(United States) Jamie van Natta	0	0	0
7	(Mexico) Linda Ochoa	0	0	0
2	(United States) Erika Anschutz	2	2	2

Semifinals
8	(United Kingdom) Andrea Gales	0	0	0
5	(Russia) Albina Loginova	2	2	2
3	(Canada) Ashley Wallace	2	1	2	2
2	(United States) Erika Anschutz	0	1	0	0

Finals
5	(Russia) Albina Loginova	2	0	1	2	0^{1}
3	(Canada) Ashley Wallace	0	2	1	0	2^{0}
Third place
8	(United Kingdom) Andrea Gales	0	1	0	0
2	(United States) Erika Anschutz	2	1	2	2

==== Mixed team ====
Finals
1	Mexico; Linda Ochoa; Hafid Jaime	150
2	United Kingdom; Nicky Hunt; Chris White	155
