= 2009 World Archery Championships – Women's individual compound =

The men's individual compound competition at the 2009 World Archery Championships took place on 2–9 September 2009 in Ulsan, South Korea. 83 archers competed in the qualification round on 2 September. As there were fewer than 128 entrants, all archers qualified for the 7-round knockout round on 5 September which was drawn according to their qualification round scores. The semi-finals and finals then took place on 9 September.

Second seed Albina Loginova beat Jorina Coetzee in the final.

== Seeds ==
The top 45 qualifiers all received byes to the second round.

1. (Mexico) Linda Ochoa (3rd round)
2. (Russia) Albina Loginova (Champion)
3. (Germany) Melanie Mikala (Quarterfinal)
4. (Germany) Andrea Weihe (2nd round)
5. (South Korea) Seok Ji-hyun (4th round)
6. (Croatia) Ivana Buden (3rd round)
7. (South Korea) Kwon Oh-hyang (4th round)
8. (South Korea) Seo Jung-hee (4th round)
9. (Italy) Laura Longo (3rd place)
10. (Canada) Ashley Wallace (Quarterfinal)
11. (Denmark) Camilla Sømod (4th place)
12. (France) Camille Bouffard-Demers (3rd round)
13. (France) Pascale Lebecque (Quarterfinal)
14. (Belgium) Gladys Willems (3rd round)
15. (United States) Erika Anschutz (4th round)
16. (United States) Kendal Nicely (2nd round)
17. (France) Valeria Febre (3rd round)
18. (United Kingdom) Nichola Simpson (3rd round)
19. (Netherlands) Inge van Caspel (2nd round)
20. (Sweden) Malin Johansson (3rd round)
21. (South Africa) Jorina Coetzee (2nd place)
22. (Iran) Ensieh Haji (2nd round)
23. (Ukraine) Nataliya Burdeyna (3rd round)
24. (United Kingdom) Nicky Hunt (2nd round)
25. (Italy) Anastasia Anastasio (3rd round)
26. (Russia) Ekaterina Korobeynikova (2nd round)
27. (Lithuania) Jelena Babinina (4th round)
28. (Venezuela) Martha Flores (2nd round)
29. (Russia) Viktoria Balzhanova (2nd round)
30. (United States) Diane Watson (3rd round)
31. (Sweden) Isabell Danielsson (2nd round)
32. (Indonesia) Dellie Threesyadinda (4th round)
33. (Chinese Taipei) Chen Li-ju (2nd round)
34. (Netherlands) Irina Markovic (3rd round)
35. (Chinese Taipei) Wen Yuh-jiun (2nd round)
36. (Mexico) Almendra Ochoa (4th round)
37. (Italy) Eugenia Salvi (3rd round)
38. (Slovenia) Maja Marcen (2nd round)
39. (Venezuela) Luzmary Guedez (3rd round)
40. (New Zealand) Stephanie Croskery (2nd round)
41. (Sweden) Zandra Reppe (3rd round)
42. (Turkey) Esra Sulun (2nd round)
43. (Iran) Seyedeh-Vida Halimianavval (3rd round)
44. (Finland) Anne Lantee (2nd round)
45. (Greece) Angeliki Giannopoulou (2nd round)

== Draw ==
=== Top half ===
==== Section 1 ====
1st round
1	(Mexico) Linda Ochoa
Bye
65	(Portugal) Liliana Cardoso	104
64	(United Kingdom) Lucy O'Sullivan	113
33	(Chinese Taipei) Chen Li-ju
Bye
32	(Indonesia) Dellie Threesyadinda
Bye
17	(France) Valerie Fabre
Bye
81	(Estonia) Maarika Jaatmaa	107^{10;10}
48	(New Zealand) Linda Lainchbury	107^{10;9}
49	(Mexico) Ana del Milagro Crisanto	107
80	(South Africa) Susan Wilson	103
16	(United States) Kendal Nicely
Bye

2nd round
1	(Mexico) Linda Ochoa	114
64	(United Kingdom) Lucy O'Sullivan	109
33	(Chinese Taipei) Chen Li-ju	110
32	(Indonesia) Dellie Threesyadinda	111
17	(France) Valerie Fabre	113
81	(Estonia) Maarika Jaatmaa	106
49	(Mexico) Ana del Milagro Crisanto	114
16	(United States) Kendal Nicely	113

3rd round
1	(Mexico) Linda Ochoa	111
32	(Indonesia) Dellie Threesyadinda	112
17	(France) Valerie Fabre	108
49	(Mexico) Ana del Milagro Crisanto	111

4th round
32	(Indonesia) Dellie Threesyadinda	106
49	(Mexico) Ana del Milagro Crisanto	113

==== Section 2 ====
1st round
9	(Italy) Laura Longo
Bye
73	(Singapore) Lian Hoe Jessie Wong	104
56	(Australia) Madeleine Ferris	109
41	(Sweden) Zandra Reppe
Bye
24	(United Kingdom) Nicky Hunt
Bye
25	(Italy) Anastasia Anastasio
Bye
40	(New Zealand) Stephanie Croskery
Bye
57	(Australia) Rebecca Darby	107
72	(Finland) Erja Jarvenpaa	104
8	(South Korea) Seo Jung-hee
Bye

2nd round
9	(Italy) Laura Longo	111
56	(Australia) Madeleine Ferris	109
41	(Sweden) Zandra Reppe	111^{9;8;10}
24	(United Kingdom) Nicky Hunt	111^{9;8;9}
25	(Italy) Anastasia Anastasio	113
40	(New Zealand) Stephanie Croskery	107
57	(Australia) Rebecca Darby	107
8	(South Korea) Seo Jung-hee	114

3rd round
9	(Italy) Laura Longo	113
41	(Sweden) Zandra Reppe	109
25	(Italy) Anastasia Anastasio	115
8	(South Korea) Seo Jung-hee	117

4th round
9	(Italy) Laura Longo	110
8	(South Korea) Seo Jung-hee	109

==== Section 3 ====
1st round
5	(South Korea) Seok Ji-hyun
Bye
69	(Canada) Sonia Schina	104
60	(Indonesia) Lilies Heliarti	108
37	(Italy) Eugenia Salvi
Bye
28	(Venezuela) Martha Flores
Bye
21	(South Africa) Jorina Coetzee
Bye
44	(Finland) Anne Lantee
Bye
53	(Japan) Yumiko Honda	108^{8}
76	(Belgium) Catheline Dessoy	108^{10}
12	(Canada) Camille Bouffard-Demers
Bye

2nd round
5	(South Korea) Seok Ji-hyun	115
65	(Indonesia) Lilies Heliarti	111
37	(Italy) Eugenia Salvi	114
28	(Venezuela) Martha Flores	107
21	(South Africa) Jorina Coetzee	111
44	(Finland) Anne Lantee	109
76	(Belgium) Catheline Dessoy	112
12	(Canada) Camille Bouffard-Demers	116

3rd round
5	(South Korea) Seok Ji-hyun	116
37	(Italy) Eugenia Salvi	113
21	(South Africa) Jorina Coetzee	116
12	(Canada) Camille Bouffard-Demers	113

4th round
5	(South Korea) Seok Ji-hyun	107
21	(South Africa) Jorina Coetzee	108

==== Section 4 ====
1st round
13	(France) Pascale Lebecque
Bye
77	(Norway) Wenche Solbakken	109
52	(Brazil) Nely Acquesta	101
45	(Greece) Angeliki Giannopoulou
Bye
20	(Sweden) Malin Johansson
Bye
29	(Russia) Viktoria Balzhanova
Bye
36	(Mexico) Almendra Ochoa
Bye
61	(Colombia) Natalia Londoño	110^{8}
68	(New Zealand) Mandy McGregor	110^{10}
4	(Germany) Andrea Weihe
Bye

2nd round
13	(France) Pascale Lebecque	110
77	(Norway) Wenche Solbakken	102
45	(Greece) Angeliki Giannopoulou	109
20	(Sweden) Malin Johansson	110
29	(Russia) Viktoria Balzhanova	110
36	(Mexico) Almendra Ochoa	112
68	(New Zealand) Mandy McGregor	111
4	(Germany) Andrea Weihe	109

3rd round
13	(France) Pascale Lebecque	113
20	(Sweden) Malin Johansson	110
36	(Mexico) Almendra Ochoa	115
68	(New Zealand) Mandy McGregor	106

4th round
13	(France) Pascale Lebecque	112
36	(Mexico) Almendra Ochoa	109

=== Bottom half ===
==== Section 5 ====
1st round
3	(Germany) Melanie Mikala
Bye
67	(Germany) Dorith Landesfeind	103^{10}
62	(India) Manjudha Soy	103^{9}
35	(Chinese Taipei) Wen Yuh-jiun
Bye
30	(United States) Diane Watson
Bye
19	(Netherlands) Inge van Caspel
Bye
83	(India) Jayalakshmi Sarikonda	101
46	(Spain) Fatima Agudo	109
51	(India) Jhano Hansdah	105
78	(Finland) Susanna Makkonen	110
14	(Belgium) Gladys Willems
Bye

2nd round
3	(Germany) Melanie Mikala	115
67	(Germany) Dorith Landesfeind	110
35	(Chinese Taipei) Wen Yuh-jiun	107
30	(United States) Diane Watson	112
19	(Netherlands) Inge van Caspel	100
46	(Spain) Fatima Agudo	108
78	(Finland) Susanna Makkonen	98
14	(Belgium) Gladys Willems	111

3rd round
3	(Germany) Melanie Mikala	113
30	(United States) Diane Watson	110
46	(Spain) Fatima Agudo	112
14	(Belgium) Gladys Willems	111

4th round
3	(Germany) Melanie Mikala	114
46	(Spain) Fatima Agudo	112

==== Section 6 ====
1st round
11	(Denmark) Camilla Sømod
Bye
75	(Australia) Fiona Hyde	107
54	(Belgium) Sarah Prieels	106
43	(Iran) Seyedeh-Vida Halimianavval
Bye
22	(Iran) Ensieh Haji
Bye
27	(Lithuania) Jelena Babinina
Bye
38	(Slovenia) Maja Marcen
Bye
59	(Norway) Kine Andersen	104
70	(France) Francoise Volle	110
6	(Croatia) Ivana Buden
Bye

2nd round
11	(Denmark) Camilla Sømod	113
75	(Australia) Fiona Hyde	108
43	(Iran) Seyedeh-Vida Halimianavval	109
22	(Iran) Ensieh Haji	108
27	(Lithuania) Jelena Babinina	111
38	(Slovenia) Maja Marcen	105
70	(France) Francoise Volle	106
6	(Croatia) Ivana Buden	110

3rd round
11	(Denmark) Camilla Sømod	118
43	(Iran) Seyedeh-Vida Halimianavval	110
27	(Lithuania) Jelena Babinina	112
6	(Croatia) Ivana Buden	111

4th round
11	(Denmark) Camilla Sømod	112
27	(Lithuania) Jelena Babinina	105

==== Section 7 ====
1st round
7	(South Korea) Kwon Oh-hyang
Bye
71	(Portugal) Leonor Lourenco	106
58	(Netherlands) Inge Enthoven	107
39	(Venezuela) Luzmary Guedez
Bye
26	(Russia) Ekaterina Korobeynikova
Bye
23	(Ukraine) Nataliya Burdeyna
Bye
42	(Turkey) Esra Sulun
Bye
55	(Venezuela) Olga Bosch	107
74	(Singapore) Vanessa Ho	112
10	(Canada) Ashley Wallace
Bye

2nd round
7	(South Korea) Kwon Oh-hyang	117
58	(Netherlands) Inge Enthoven	113
39	(Venezuela) Luzmary Guedez	112
26	(Russia) Ekaterina Korobeynikova	110
23	(Ukraine) Nataliya Burdeyna	113
42	(Turkey) Esra Sulun	112
74	(Singapore) Vanessa Ho	136
10	(Canada) Ashley Wallace	140

3rd round
7	(South Korea) Kwon Oh-hyang	115
39	(Venezuela) Luzmary Guedez	110
23	(Ukraine) Nataliya Burdeyna	110
10	(Canada) Ashley Wallace	114

4th round
7	(South Korea) Kwon Oh-hyang	109
10	(Canada) Ashley Wallace	110

==== Section 8 ====
1st round
15	(United States) Erika Anschutz
Bye
79	(Switzerland) Tania Forni	104
50	(Norway) June Svensen	105
47	(Brazil) Dirma Miranda Dos Santos	111
82	(Portugal) Ana Gutierres	106
18	(United Kingdom) Nichola Simpson
Bye
31	(Sweden) Isabell Danielsson
Bye
34	(Netherlands) Irina Markovic
Bye
63	(Iran) Far Leila Sakhaei	110
66	(Brazil) Talita Araujo	98
2	(Russia) Albina Loginova
Bye

2nd round
15	(United States) Erika Anschutz	113
50	(Norway) June Svensen	108
47	(Brazil) Dirma Miranda Dos Santos	107
18	(United Kingdom) Nichola Simpson	115
31	(Sweden) Isabell Danielsson	110
34	(Netherlands) Irina Markovic	113
63	(Iran) Far Leila Sakhaei	105
2	(Russia) Albina Loginova	114

3rd round
15	(United States) Erika Anschutz	113
18	(United Kingdom) Nichola Simpson	112
34	(Netherlands) Irina Markovic	113^{10;9}
2	(Russia) Albina Loginova	113^{10;10}

4th round
15	(United States) Erika Anschutz	118
2	(Russia) Albina Loginova	119

== Finals ==
Quarterfinals
49	(Mexico) Ana del Milagro Crisanto	108
9	(Italy) Laura Longo	114
21	(South Africa) Jorina Coetzee	107
13	(France) Pascale Lebecque	106
3	(Germany) Melanie Mikala	110^{8}
11	(Denmark) Camilla Sømod	110^{9}
10	(Canada) Ashley Wallace	112
2	(Russia) Albina Loginova	115

Semifinals
9	(Italy) Laura Longo	110
21	(South Africa) Jorina Coetzee	113
11	(Denmark) Camilla Sømod	113^{10;9}
2	(Russia) Albina Loginova	113^{10;10}

Finals
21	(South Africa) Jorina Coetzee	106
2	(Russia) Albina Loginova	116
Third place
9	(Italy) Laura Longo	118
11	(Denmark) Camilla Sømod	113
