= Archery World Cup =

Competition

- Status: active
- Genre: sporting event
- Date: April – October
- Frequency: annual
- Country: varying
- Inaugurated: 2006
- Founder: World Archery
- Previous event: 2025 Archery World Cup
- Next event: 2027 Archery World Cup
- 2026 Archery World Cup

The Archery World Cup is a competition outdoor organized by World Archery, where the archers compete in four stages in four countries and the best eight archers of each category (from 2010, four archers during 2006–09) advance to an additional stage to contest the Archery World Cup Final. Started in 2006, this form of competition was introduced following the success of the 2003 World Archery Championships in New York and the 2004 Summer Olympics with the intent of making the sport more popular and attractive to spectators, with the matches being held in 'spectacular' locations and the final matches being broadcast online. It has received plaudits for its innovative approach to the sport, raising its profile and reach.

From 2013, the World Cup is broadcast live on Eurosport. It carries sponsorship from Kia and Longines, which supports the annual Longines Prize of Precision for archery, for the "best male and female athletes that master bow and arrow through concentration, balance, accuracy, and skill".

== Prize money ==
The prize money for 2025 season was:

2025 Prize money
Position	Stage	Final
1st	4,500 CHF	30,000 CHF
2nd	2,500 CHF	15,000 CHF
3rd	1,700 CHF	8,000 CHF
4th	1,200 CHF	1,500 CHF
5th	450 CHF	
6th	400 CHF	
7th	350 CHF	
8th	300 CHF	

The prize money for 2022 season was:

2022 Prize money
Position	Stage	Final
1st	3,500 CHF	28,000 CHF
2nd	2,200 CHF	14,000 CHF
3rd	1,100 CHF	7,000 CHF
4th	800 CHF	1,500 CHF

In the World Cup Finals the prize money for the individual competitions in 2018 was:

- 1st place: 20,000 CHF
- 2nd place: 10,000 CHF
- 3rd place: 5,000 CHF
- 4th place: 1,000 CHF

For each individual World Cup stage, the prize money offered for individual competitions in 2013 was:

- 1st place: 2,000 CHF
- 2nd place: 1,000 CHF
- 3rd place: 500 CHF

== Host venues ==
Host cities of the Archery World Cup (italic = stage host, bold = finals host)

The following venues have hosted stages of the World Cup Final.

Number	Year	Stage 1	Stage 2	Stage 3	Stage 4	Final	Events
1	2006	(Croatia) Poreč	(Turkey) Antalya	(El Salvador) San Salvador	(China) Shanghai	(Mexico) **Mérida**	36
2	2007	(South Korea) Ulsan	(Italy) Varese	(Turkey) Antalya	(United Kingdom) Dover	(United Arab Emirates) **Dubai**	36
3	2008	(Dominican Republic) Santo Domingo	(Croatia) Poreč	(Turkey) Antalya	(France) Boé	(Switzerland) **Lausanne**	36
4	2009	(Dominican Republic) Santo Domingo	(Croatia) Poreč	(Turkey) Antalya	(China) Shanghai	(Denmark) **Copenhagen**	46
5	2010	(Croatia) Poreč	(Turkey) Antalya	(United States) Ogden	(China) Shanghai	(United Kingdom) **Edinburgh**	46
6	2011	(Croatia) Poreč	(Turkey) Antalya	(United States) Ogden	(China) Shanghai	(Turkey) **Istanbul**	46
7	2012	(China) Shanghai	(Turkey) Antalya	(United States) Ogden	n/c: 2012 Olympics	(Japan) **Tokyo**	36
8	2013	(China) Shanghai	(Turkey) Antalya	(Colombia) Medellín	(Poland) Wrocław	(France) **Paris**	46
9	2014	(China) Shanghai	(Colombia) Medellín	(Turkey) Antalya	(Poland) Wrocław	(Switzerland) **Lausanne**	46
10	2015	(China) Shanghai	(Turkey) Antalya	(Poland) Wrocław	(Colombia) Medellín	**Mexico City**	46
11	2016	(China) Shanghai	(Colombia) Medellín	(Turkey) Antalya	n/c: 2016 Olympics	(Denmark) **Odense**	36
12	2017	(China) Shanghai	(Turkey) Antalya	(United States) Salt Lake City	(Germany) Berlin	(Italy) **Rome**	46
13	2018	(China) Shanghai	(Turkey) Antalya	(United States) Salt Lake City	(Germany) Berlin	(Turkey) **Samsun**	46
14	2019	(Colombia) Medellín	(China) Shanghai	(Turkey) Antalya	(Germany) Berlin	(Russia) **Moscow**	46
—	2020	Cancelled					
15	2021	Guatemala City	(Switzerland) Lausanne	(France) Paris	n/c: 2020 Olympics	(United States) **Yankton**	34
16	2022	(Turkey) Antalya	(South Korea) Gwangju	(France) Paris	(Colombia) Medellín	(Mexico) **Tlaxcala**	44
17	2023	(Turkey) Antalya	(China) Shanghai	(Colombia) Medellín	(France) Paris	(Mexico) **Hermosillo**	44
18	2024	(China) Shanghai	(South Korea) Yecheon	(Turkey) Antalya	n/c: 2024 Olympics	(Mexico) **Tlaxcala**	34
19	2025	(United States) Central Florida	(China) Shanghai	(Turkey) Antalya	(Spain) Madrid	(China) **Nanjing**	44
20	2026	(Mexico) Puebla	(China) Shanghai	(Turkey) Antalya	(Spain) Madrid	(Mexico) Saltillo	
21	2027	(United States) Central Florida	(China) Shanghai	(Turkey) Antalya	(Spain) Madrid	(Mexico) TBD	
22	2028						

== Editions and winners ==
=== Recurve ===
==== Men ====
Finals	Gold	Silver	Bronze
(Mexico) 2006 Mérida	(South Korea) Park Kyung-mo	(Italy) Ilario Di Buò	(Sweden) Magnus Petersson
(United Arab Emirates) 2007 Dubai	(Russia) Baljinima Tsyrempilov	(Mexico) Juan René Serrano	(United Kingdom) Alan Wills
(Switzerland) 2008 Lausanne	(South Korea) Im Dong-hyun	(Ukraine) Viktor Ruban	(France) Romain Girouille
(Denmark) 2009 Copenhagen	(Italy) Marco Galiazzo	(United Kingdom) Simon Terry	(France) Romain Girouille
(United Kingdom) 2010 Edinburgh	(United States) Brady Ellison	(South Korea) Im Dong-hyun	(India) Jayanta Talukdar
(Turkey) 2011 Istanbul	(United States) Brady Ellison	(China) Dai Xiaoxiang	(Ukraine) Dmytro Hrachov
(Japan) 2012 Tokyo	(South Korea) Kim Woo-jin	(United States) Brady Ellison	(France) Gaël Prévost
(France) 2013 Paris	(South Korea) Oh Jin-hyek	(China) Dai Xiaoxiang	(United States) Brady Ellison
(Switzerland) 2014 Lausanne	(United States) Brady Ellison	(Brazil) Marcus D'Almeida	(Netherlands) Rick van der Ven
2015 Mexico City	(Spain) Miguel Alvariño García	(France) Jean-Charles Valladont	(South Korea) Kim Woo-jin
(Denmark) 2016 Odense	(United States) Brady Ellison	(Netherlands) Sjef van den Berg	(South Korea) Ku Bon-chan
(Italy) 2017 Rome	(South Korea) Kim Woo-jin	(United States) Brady Ellison	(South Korea) Im Dong-hyun
(Turkey) 2018 Samsun	(South Korea) Kim Woo-jin	(South Korea) Lee Woo-seok	(United States) Brady Ellison
(Russia) 2019 Moscow	(United States) Brady Ellison	(Italy) Mauro Nespoli	(Netherlands) Sjef van den Berg
(United States) 2021 Yankton	(United States) Jack Williams	(United States) Brady Ellison	(Turkey) Mete Gazoz
(Mexico) 2022 Tlaxcala	(South Korea) Kim Woo-jin	(Spain) Miguel Alvariño García	(Turkey) Mete Gazoz
(Mexico) 2023 Hermosillo	(Brazil) Marcus D'Almeida	(South Korea) Lee Woo-seok	(Italy) Mauro Nespoli
(Mexico) 2024 Tlaxcala	(South Korea) Kim Woo-jin (5)	(South Korea) Lee Woo-seok	(Brazil) Marcus D'Almeida
(China) 2025 Nanjing	(United States) Brady Ellison (6)	(Brazil) Marcus D'Almeida	(France) Thomas Chirault
(Mexico) 2026 Saltillo	(India) Dhiraj Bommadevara	(Japan) Junya Nakanishi	(Turkey) Mete Gazoz

==== Women ====
Finals	Gold	Silver	Bronze
(Mexico) 2006 Mérida	(China) Zhang Juanjuan	(China) Qian Jialing	(Italy) Elena Tonetta
(United Arab Emirates) 2007 Dubai	(India) Dola Banerjee	(South Korea) Choi Eun-young	(Russia) Natalya Erdyniyeva
(Switzerland) 2008 Lausanne	(Poland) Justyna Mospinek	(South Korea) Park Sung-hyun	(South Korea) Yun Ok-hee
(Denmark) 2009 Copenhagen	(South Korea) Kwak Ye-ji	(China) Zhao Ling	(South Korea) Yun Ok-hee
(United Kingdom) 2010 Edinburgh	(South Korea) Yun Ok-hee	(Ukraine) Victoriya Koval	(South Korea) Ki Bo-bae
(Turkey) 2011 Istanbul	(China) Cheng Ming	(India) Deepika Kumari	(France) Bérengère Schuh
(Japan) 2012 Tokyo	(South Korea) Ki Bo-bae	(India) Deepika Kumari	(South Korea) Choi Hyeon-ju
(France) 2013 Paris	(South Korea) Yun Ok-hee (2)	(India) Deepika Kumari	(China) Cui Yuanyuan
(Switzerland) 2014 Lausanne	(Mexico) Aída Román	(China) Cheng Ming	(China) Xu Jing
2015 Mexico City	(South Korea) Choi Mi-sun	(India) Deepika Kumari	(Chinese Taipei) Le Chien-ying
(Denmark) 2016 Odense	(South Korea) Ki Bo-bae	(South Korea) Choi Mi-sun	(Chinese Taipei) Tan Ya-ting
(Italy) 2017 Rome	(South Korea) Ki Bo-bae (3)	(Russia) Ksenia Perova	(South Korea) Chang Hye-jin
(Turkey) 2018 Samsun	(South Korea) Lee Eun-gyeong	(Turkey) Yasemin Anagöz	(India) Deepika Kumari
(Russia) 2019 Moscow	(South Korea) Kang Chae-young	(Chinese Taipei) Tan Ya-ting	(China) Zheng Yichai
(United States) 2021 Yankton	(Germany) Lisa Unruh	(Russia) Elena Osipova	(Germany) Michelle Kroppen
(Mexico) 2022 Tlaxcala	(South Korea) An San	(South Korea) Choi Mi-sun	(Chinese Taipei) Peng Chia-mao
(Mexico) 2023 Hermosillo	(South Korea) Kang Chae-young (2)	(Mexico) Alejandra Valencia	(South Korea) Lim Si-hyeon
(Mexico) 2024 Tlaxcala	(China) Li Jiaman	(India) Deepika Kumari	(Mexico) Alejandra Valencia
(China) 2025 Nanjing	(South Korea) An San (2)	(Chinese Taipei) Hsu Hsin-tzu	(South Korea) Kang Chae-young

==== Mixed team ====
Finals	Gold	Silver	Bronze
(Denmark) 2009 Copenhagen	China; Zhao Ling; Xing Yu	Denmark; Carina Christiansen; Morten Caspersen	—N/a
(United Kingdom) 2010 Edinburgh	United States; Khatuna Lorig; Jake Kaminski	United Kingdom; Naomi Folkard; Simon Terry	—N/a
(Turkey) 2011 Istanbul	South Korea; Jung Dasomi; Oh Jin-hyek	Turkey; Natalia Nasaridze; Yağız Yılmaz	—N/a
(Japan) 2012 Tokyo	United States; Jennifer Nichols; Brady Ellison	Japan; Miki Kanie; Takaharu Furukawa	—N/a
(France) 2013 Paris	South Korea; Yun Ok-hee; Oh Jin-hyek	France; Cyrielle Cotry; Gaël Prévost	—N/a
(Switzerland) 2014 Lausanne	Mexico; Aída Román; Eduardo Vélez	Switzerland; Iliana Deineko; Florian Faber	—N/a
2015 Mexico City	South Korea; Choi Mi-sun; Kim Woo-jin	Mexico; Alejandra Valencia; Luis Álvarez	—N/a
(Denmark) 2016 Odense	South Korea; Choi Mi-sun; Ku Bon-chan	Denmark; Maja Jager; Johan Weiss	—N/a
(Italy) 2017 Rome	South Korea; Chang Hye-jin; Kim Woo-jin	Italy; Vanessa Landi; Mauro Nespoli	—N/a
(Turkey) 2018 Samsun	South Korea; Chang Hye-jin; Kim Woo-jin	Turkey; Yasemin Anagöz; Mete Gazoz	—N/a
(Russia) 2019 Moscow	South Korea; Kim Woo-jin; Kang Chae-young	Russia; Erdem Irdyneev; Elena Osipova	—N/a

=== Compound ===
==== Men ====
Finals	Gold	Silver	Bronze
(Mexico) 2006 Mérida	(United States) Reo Wilde	(Netherlands) Peter Elzinga	(El Salvador) Jorge Jiménez
(United Arab Emirates) 2007 Dubai	(El Salvador) Jorge Jiménez	(United States) Braden Gellenthien	(Brazil) Roberval dos Santos
(Switzerland) 2008 Lausanne	(Canada) Dietmar Trillus	(Switzerland) Patrizio Hofer	(Australia) Patrick Coghlan
(Denmark) 2009 Copenhagen	(Italy) Sergio Pagni	(United States) Braden Gellenthien	(Switzerland) Patrizio Hofer
(United Kingdom) 2010 Edinburgh	(Italy) Sergio Pagni (2)	(United States) Braden Gellenthien	(United States) Rodger Willett Jr.
(Turkey) 2011 Istanbul	(United States) Rodger Willett Jr.	(United States) Reo Wilde	(Italy) Sergio Pagni
(Japan) 2012 Tokyo	(United States) Braden Gellenthien	(United States) Reo Wilde (2)	(Mexico) Julio Ricardo Fierro
(France) 2013 Paris	(Denmark) Martin Damsbo	(United States) Braden Gellenthien	(Italy) Sergio Pagni (2)
(Switzerland) 2014 Lausanne	(United States) Bridger Deaton	(France) Pierre-Julien Deloche	(United States) Reo Wilde
2015 Mexico City	(Turkey) Demir Elmaağaçlı	(India) Abhishek Verma	(France) Dominique Genet
(Denmark) 2016 Odense	(Netherlands) Mike Schloesser	(South Africa) Seppie Cilliers	(United States) Reo Wilde (2)
(Italy) 2017 Rome	(United States) Braden Gellenthien (2)	(Denmark) Stephan Hansen	(United States) Steve Anderson
(Turkey) 2018 Samsun	(United States) Kris Schaff	(Turkey) Demir Elmaağaçlı	(India) Abhishek Verma
(Russia) 2019 Moscow	(Netherlands) Mike Schloesser	(United States) Braden Gellenthien	(Colombia) Daniel Muñoz
(United States) 2021 Yankton	(Netherlands) Mike Schloesser	(United States) Braden Gellenthien (6)	(United States) Kris Schaff
(Mexico) 2022 Tlaxcala	(Netherlands) Mike Schloesser (4)	(France) Nicolas Girard	(Puerto Rico) Jean Pizarro
(Mexico) 2023 Hermosillo	(Denmark) Mathias Fullerton	(India) Prathamesh Jawkar	(Netherlands) Mike Schloesser
(Mexico) 2024 Tlaxcala	(United States) James Lutz	(Denmark) Mathias Fullerton	(Netherlands) Mike Schloesser
(China) 2025 Nanjing	(Turkey) Emircan Haney	(Denmark) Mathias Fullerton	(Netherlands) Mike Schloesser
(Mexico) 2026 Saltillo	(Austria) Nico Wiener	(Denmark) Mathias Fullerton	(Mexico) Rodrigo González

==== Women ====
Finals	Gold	Silver	Bronze
(Mexico) 2006 Mérida	(Russia) Sofia Goncharova	(Russia) Anna Kazantseva	(United States) Jahna Davis
(United Arab Emirates) 2007 Dubai	(Sweden) Petra Ericsson	(Russia) Sofia Goncharova	(United States) Jamie van Natta
(Switzerland) 2008 Lausanne	(United States) Jamie van Natta	(United Kingdom) Nichola Simpson	(France) Amandine Bouillot
(Denmark) 2009 Copenhagen	(Venezuela) Luzmary Guedez	(Denmark) Camilla Sømod	(Croatia) Ivana Buden
(United Kingdom) 2010 Edinburgh	(Russia) Albina Loginova	(Canada) Ashley Wallace	(United States) Erika Jones
(Turkey) 2011 Istanbul	(United States) Erika Jones	(United States) Christie Colin	(Italy) Marcella Tonioli
(Japan) 2012 Tokyo	(United States) Jamie van Natta (2)	(United Kingdom) Danielle Brown	(United States) Christie Colin
(France) 2013 Paris	(Colombia) Alejandra Usquiano	(United States) Erika Jones	(Russia) Albina Loginova
(Switzerland) 2014 Lausanne	(Colombia) Sara López	(United States) Erika Jones	(Russia) Natalia Avdeeva
2015 Mexico City	(Colombia) Sara López	(Russia) Maria Vinogradova	(Mexico) Linda Ochoa
(Denmark) 2016 Odense	(Italy) Marcella Tonioli	(Denmark) Sarah Sonnichsen	(United States) Crystal Gauvin
(Italy) 2017 Rome	(Colombia) Sara López	(Denmark) Tanja Gellenthien	(Turkey) Yeşim Bostan
(Turkey) 2018 Samsun	(Colombia) Sara López	(Mexico) Linda Ochoa	(South Korea) So Chae-won
(Russia) 2019 Moscow	(Colombia) Sara López	(Russia) Natalia Avdeeva	(France) Sophie Dodemomt
(United States) 2021 Yankton	(Colombia) Sara López	(Slovenia) Toja Ellison	(Denmark) Tanja Gellenthien
(Mexico) 2022 Tlaxcala	(Colombia) Sara López	(United Kingdom) Ella Gibson	(Colombia) Alejandra Usquiano
(Mexico) 2023 Hermosillo	(Colombia) Sara López	(Denmark) Tanja Gellenthien	(Mexico) Dafne Quintero
(Mexico) 2024 Tlaxcala	(Colombia) Sara López (9)	(Estonia) Meeri-Marita Paas	(Mexico) Dafne Quintero
(China) 2025 Nanjing	(Mexico) Andrea Becerra	(India) Jyothi Surekha	(United Kingdom) Ella Gibson
(Mexico) 2026 Saltillo	(United States) Alexis Ruiz	(Mexico) Dafne Quintero	(Colombia) Sara López

==== Mixed team ====
Finals	Gold	Silver	Bronze
(Denmark) 2009 Copenhagen	Denmark; Camilla Sømod; Martin Damsbo	Italy; Anastasia Anastasio; Sergio Pagni	—N/a
(United Kingdom) 2010 Edinburgh	United Kingdom; Nicky Hunt; Chris White	Mexico; Linda Ochoa; Hafid Jaime	—N/a
(Turkey) 2011 Istanbul	United States; Christie Colin; Rodger Willett Jr.	Turkey; Gizem Kocaman; Ali Davarci	—N/a
(Japan) 2012 Tokyo	United States; Christie Colin; Reo Wilde	Japan; Yumiko Hondo; Naoto Anji	—N/a
(France) 2013 Paris	France; Pascale Lebecque; Pierre-Julien Deloche	Italy; Marcella Tonioli; Sergio Pagni	—N/a
(Switzerland) 2014 Lausanne	United States; Erika Jones; Bridger Deaton	Switzerland; Clementine de Guili; Patrizio Hofer	—N/a
2015 Mexico City	Denmark; Erika Anear; Stephan Hansen	Mexico; Linda Ochoa; Mario Cardoso	—N/a
(Denmark) 2016 Odense	Denmark; Tanja Gellenthien; Stephan Hansen	Colombia; Alejandra Usquiano; Camilo Cardona	—N/a
(Italy) 2017 Rome	Denmark; Sarah Holst Sönnichsen; Stephan Hansen	Italy; Irene Franchini; Alberto Simonelli	—N/a
(Turkey) 2018 Samsun	Turkey; Yeşim Bostan; Demir Elmaağaçlı	India; Jyothi Surekha Vennam; Abhishek Verma	—N/a
(Russia) 2019 Moscow	United States; Braden Gellenthien; Alexis Ruiz	Russia; Pavel Krylov; Elizaveta Knyazeva	—N/a

=== Longines Prize for Precision ===
The Longines Prize for Precision is awarded to the male and female archers who shoot the most 10s over the course of the competition at the end of the season. It has been awarded since 2010 and is awarded to compound and recurve archers in alternate years. Winners receive a trophy, watch and cash prize of 5,000 CHF.

Winners

Year	R/C	Men's winner	Women's winner
2010	R	(United States) Brady Ellison	(Poland) Justyna Mospinek
2011	C	(United States) Rodger Willett Jr.	(United States) Erika Anschutz
2012	R	(United States) Brady Ellison	(South Korea) Ki Bo-bae
2013	C	(United States) Braden Gellenthien	(United States) Erika Jones
2014	R	(United States) Brady Ellison	(Mexico) Aída Román
2015	C	(Netherlands) Mike Schloesser	(Colombia) Sara López
2016	R	(United States) Brady Ellison	(Chinese Taipei) Tan Ya-ting
2017	C	(Denmark) Stephan Hansen	(Denmark) Sarah Holst Sönnichsen
2018	R	(South Korea) Lee Woo-seok	(South Korea) Chang Hye-jin
2019	C	(United States) Braden Gellenthien	(United States) Alexis Ruiz
2021	C	(Netherlands) Mike Schloesser	(Denmark) Tanja Gellenthien
2023	R	(South Korea) Lee Woo-seok	(South Korea) Lim Si-hyeon
2024	C	(Netherlands) Mike Schloesser	(Mexico) Andrea Becerra

== Medal table ==
=== Nations ===
Including all individual and team stage and final medals up to end of 2026 World Cup Stage I.

- † Final host nation
- ‡ Stage host nation

Rank	Nation	Gold	Silver	Bronze	Total
1	South Korea‡	191	94	90	375
2	United States†	153	109	101	363
3	India	46	51	52	149
4	Russia†	43	44	38	125
5	Italy†	40	49	44	133
6	Colombia‡	40	21	12	73
7	China†	37	37	43	117
8	Denmark†	37	35	16	88
9	France†	36	34	61	131
10	Netherlands	27	28	35	90
11	Mexico†	24	51	45	120
12	Chinese Taipei	24	29	37	90
13	Great Britain†	21	33	27	81
14	Turkey†	15	26	24	65
15	Germany	9	20	26	55
16	Japan†	8	19	16	43
17	Spain‡	7	10	9	26
18	Brazil	5	6	6	17
19	Ukraine	4	8	13	25
20	Venezuela	4	1	6	11
21	Canada	3	10	10	23
22	Iran	3	8	4	15
23	El Salvador‡	3	7	7	17
24	Sweden	3	5	1	9
25	South Africa	3	4	1	8
26	Belgium	3	3	6	12
27	Australia	2	10	11	23
28	Kazakhstan	2	1	1	4
29	New Zealand	2	1	0	3
30	Slovakia	2	0	0	2
31	Poland‡	1	7	1	9
32	Malaysia	1	5	6	12
33	Croatia‡	1	5	4	10
34	Austria	1	2	0	3
35	Indonesia	1	1	5	7
36	Moldova	1	1	0	2
37	Guatemala‡	1	0	0	1
38	Slovenia	0	7	5	12
39	Estonia	0	7	4	11
40	Switzerland†	0	4	4	8
41	Belarus	0	2	3	5
42	Greece	0	2	0	2
43	Puerto Rico	0	1	2	3
44	Georgia	0	1	1	2
45	Bangladesh	0	1	0	1
45	Individual Neutral Athletes	0	1	0	1
45	Iraq	0	1	0	1
45	Luxembourg	0	1	0	1
45	Norway	0	1	0	1
50	Philippines	0	0	2	2
51	Argentina	0	0	1	1
51	Bulgaria	0	0	1	1
51	Lithuania	0	0	1	1
Totals (53 entries)		804	804	782	2,390

=== Archers ===
The following table shows the total number of all medals (including stage and finals).

Including stage and final medals up to 2026 World Cup Stage I.

Recurve archer
Compound archer

Rank	Nation	Gold	Silver	Bronze	Total
1	(South Korea) Kim Woo-jin	43	16	13	72
2	(United States) Braden Gellenthien	38	24	14	76
3	(United States) Brady Ellison	36	18	17	71
4	(Colombia) Sara López	36	11	8	55
5	(United States) Reo Wilde	32	12	16	60
6	(South Korea) Kang Chae-young	24	2	3	29
7	(Netherlands) Mike Schloesser	19	10	14	43
8	(South Korea) Oh Jin-hyek	19	8	7	34
9	(South Korea) Yun Ok-hee	19	4	7	30
10	(South Korea) Choi Mi-sun	18	5	4	27
11	(United States) Jamie Van Natta	17	16	11	44
12	(United States) Erika Jones	17	14	6	37
13	(South Korea) Lee Woo-seok	17	12	5	34
14	(South Korea) Ki Bo-bae	17	8	5	30
15	(South Korea) Chang Hye-jin	17	8	3	28
16	(South Korea) Im Dong-hyun	17	4	11	32
17	(South Korea) Lim Si-hyeon	15	5	2	22
18	(Italy) Sergio Pagni	12	12	11	35
19	(Denmark) Martin Damsbo	12	12	10	34
20	(India) Jyothi Surekha	12	9	7	28
21	(Russia) Albina Loginova	12	7	11	30
22	(South Korea) An San	12	1	3	16
23	(India) Deepika Kumari	11	19	9	39
24	(Chinese Taipei) Tan Ya-ting	11	7	14	32
25	(India) Abhishek Verma	11	4	12	27
26	(South Korea) Lee Seung-yun	11	2	3	16
27	(Colombia) Alejandra Usquiano	10	10	5	25
28	(United States) Christie Colin	10	4	3	17
29	(Russia) Sofia Goncharova	10	4	2	16
29	(South Korea) Kim Je-deok	10	4	2	16
31	(United States) Alexis Ruiz	10	3	9	22
32	(Denmark) Tanja Gellenthien	9	9	3	21
33	(United States) Kris Schaff	9	7	7	23
34	(United States) Rodger Willett Jr.	9	4	4	17
35	(United States) Dave Cousins	9	0	1	10
36	(France) Pierre-Julien Deloche	8	7	6	21
37	(Denmark) Mathias Fullerton	8	2	3	13
38	(India) Jayanta Talukdar	7	10	6	23
39	(Mexico) Andrea Becerra	7	8	5	20
40	(United Kingdom) Ella Gibson	7	7	5	19
41	(Denmark) Sarah Sonnichsen	7	6	1	14
42	(South Korea) Ku Bon-chan	7	4	2	13
43	(United States) Paige Pearce	7	3	1	11
44	(South Korea) Joo Hyun-jung	7	1	5	13
45	(United States) / (Mexico) Linda Ochoa-Anderson	6	11	7	24
46	(Italy) Marcella Tonioli	6	8	10	24
47	(Russia) Natalia Avdeeva	6	8	7	21
48	(Chinese Taipei) Peng Chia-mao	6	5	7	18
48	(South Korea) Kim Jong-ho	6	5	7	18
50	(China) Cheng Ming	6	5	6	17
51	(Russia) Anna Kazantseva	6	5	2	13
52	(Italy) Marco Galiazzo	6	4	2	12
53	(Italy) Ilario Di Buò	6	3	0	9
54	(United States) Bridger Deaton	6	2	2	10
55	(South Korea) Jung Dasomi	6	1	4	11
55	(France) Sebastien Peineau	6	1	4	11
57	(South Korea) Park Sung-hyun	6	1	3	10
58	(Mexico) Aída Román	5	9	5	19
59	(France) Jean-Charles Valladont	5	6	7	18
60	(United States) James Lutz	5	6	3	14
60	(South Korea) Choi Bo-min	5	6	3	14
62	(India) Rahul Banerjee	5	5	1	11
63	(South Korea) So Chae-won	5	4	8	17
64	(Chinese Taipei) Tang Chih-chun	5	3	4	12
65	(South Korea) Lee Chang-hwan	5	1	1	7
66	(Italy) Mauro Nespoli	4	10	5	19
67	(Japan) Takaharu Furukawa	4	8	8	20
68	(Netherlands) Peter Elzinga	4	6	6	16
69	(Colombia) Daniel Muñoz	4	6	1	11
70	(Spain) Miguel Alvariño	4	5	5	14
71	(Germany) Florian Unruh	4	5	4	13
71	(China) Xing Yu	4	5	4	13
73	(United States) Casey Kaufhold	4	5	2	11
74	(China) Li Jiaman	4	4	4	12
75	(Brazil) Marcus D'Almeida	4	4	3	11
76	(Turkey) Yeşim Bostan	4	3	6	13
77	(United States) Sawyer Sullivan	4	3	0	7
78	(France) Nicolas Girard	4	2	3	9
79	(Italy) Michele Frangilli	4	2	2	8
80	(China) Fang Yuting	4	1	4	9
81	(South Korea) Park Kyung-mo	4	1	3	8
82	(United States) Diane Watson	4	1	2	7
83	(India) Parneet Kaur	4	1	1	6
84	(Venezuela) Luzmary Guedez	4	0	3	7
85	(India) Ojas Deotale	4	0	2	6
86	(South Korea) Kwak Ye-ji	4	0	1	5
86	(India) Aditi Swami	4	0	1	5
88	(South Korea) Lee Eun-gyeong	4	0	0	4
89	(Mexico) Alejandra Valencia	3	12	13	28

The following table shows the total number of individual medals (including stage and finals).

Including stage and final medals up to end of 2025 World Cup final.

Recurve archer
Compound archer

Rank	Nation	Gold	Silver	Bronze	Total
1	(Colombia) Sara López	22	4	4	30
2	(United States) Brady Ellison	17	6	5	28
3	(Netherlands) Mike Schloesser	15	5	8	28
4	(South Korea) Kim Woo-jin	13	8	6	27
5	(United States) Braden Gellenthien	8	13	6	27
6	(South Korea) Yun Ok-hee	8	3	5	16
7	(United States) Reo Wilde	7	5	7	19
8	(Italy) Sergio Pagni	7	2	3	12
9	(South Korea) Kang Chae-young	7	1	2	10
10	(South Korea) Ki Bo-bae	6	4	3	13
11	(United States) Jamie Van Natta	5	6	3	14
12	(South Korea) Choi Mi-sun	5	3	3	11
13	(South Korea) Im Dong-hyun	5	2	6	13
14	(United Kingdom) Ella Gibson	5	2	1	8
15	(South Korea) Lim Si-hyeon	5	1	1	7
16	(India) Deepika Kumari	4	9	5	18
17	(United States) Erika Jones	4	7	2	13
18	(Brazil) Marcus D'Almeida	4	3	2	9
19	(Russia) Sofia Goncharova	4	2	1	7
20	(South Korea) An San	4	1	1	6
21	(United States) Rodger Willett Jr.	4	0	2	6
22	(South Korea) Lee Seung-yun	4	0	0	4
23	(South Korea) Lee Woo-seok	3	7	2	12
24	(South Korea) Oh Jin-hyek	3	5	2	10

== Indoor World Cup ==
An Indoor Archery World Cup was inaugurated in 2010. It is played in the off-season (November to February), with fewer stages and the final competed in Las Vegas. In 2014, the stages were held in Marrakesh, Singapore and Telford. 2019-2020 Indoor Archery World Series have 6 qualification and one final stage. After 2018, the World Indoor Archery Championships were discontinued, leaving the Indoor Archery World Series as the premier championship in indoor archery.

Year	Host (Final)	Men's Recurve	Women's Recurve	Men's Compound	Women's Compound	Ref
2011	(United States) Las Vegas	(Italy) Michele Frangilli	(Denmark) Louise Laursen	(United States) Reo Wilde	(Russia) Albina Loginova	
2012	(United States) Las Vegas	(United States) Brady Ellison	(Russia) Ksenia Perova	(United States) Reo Wilde	(France) Joanna Chesse	
2013	(United States) Las Vegas	(United States) Brady Ellison	(South Korea) Jeon Sung-eun	(United States) Braden Gellenthien	(United Kingdom) Andrea Gales	
2014	(United States) Las Vegas	(Netherlands) Rick van der Ven	(South Korea) Park Se-hui	(France) Sebastien Peineau	(United States) Erika Jones	
2015	(United States) Las Vegas	(South Korea) Kim Jaeh-yeong	(South Korea) Jo Seung-hyeon	(Netherlands) Mike Schloesser	(United States) Erika Jones	
2016	(United States) Las Vegas	(United States) Brady Ellison	(United States) Khatuna Lorig	(United States) Jesse Broadwater	(Denmark) Sarah Sonnichsen	
2017	(United States) Las Vegas	(South Korea) Oh Jin-hyek	(South Korea) Song Ji-yung	(United States) Jesse Broadwater	(Denmark) Tanja Gellenthien	
2018	(United States) Las Vegas	(South Korea) Han Jae-yeop	(Germany) Lisa Unruh	(United States) Jesse Broadwater	(Russia) Alexandra Savenkova	
2019	(United States) Las Vegas	(Netherlands) Steve Wijler	(South Korea) Sim Ye-ji	(United States) Kris Schaff	(Russia) Viktoria Balzhanova	
2020	(United States) Las Vegas	(Germany) Florian Unruh	(South Korea) Wi Na-yeon	(Netherlands) Mike Schloesser	(United States) Paige Pearce	
2022	(United States) Las Vegas	(Germany) Felix Wieser	(United Kingdom) Penny Healey	(France) Nicolas Girard	(Slovenia) Toja Ellison	
2023	(United States) Las Vegas	(Netherlands) Steve Wijler	(South Korea) Duna Lim	(United States) Bodie Turner	(Italy) Elisa Roner	
2024	(United States) Las Vegas	(United States) Brady Ellison	(Germany) Michelle Kroppen	(United States) James Lutz	(Italy) Elisa Roner	
2025	(United States) Las Vegas	(United States) Brady Ellison	(United States) Casey Kaufhold	(Austria) Nico Wiener	(Denmark) Tanja Gellenthien	

=== Recurve men ===
Year	Host (Final)	Gold	Silver	Bronze	Ref
2011	(United States) Las Vegas	(Italy) Michele Frangilli	(United States) Jake Kaminsky	(France) Thomas Aubert	Source
2012	(United States) Las Vegas	(United States) Brady Ellison	(United States) Jake Kaminsky	(Italy) Matteo Fissore	
2013	(United States) Las Vegas	(United States) Brady Ellison	(France) Jean-Charles Valladont	(Netherlands) Rick Van Der Ven	
2014	(United States) Las Vegas	(Netherlands) Rick Van Der Ven	(Italy) Matteo Fissore	(United States) Brady Ellison	
