= 2011 Archery World Cup =

International archery competition

The 2011 Archery World Cup was the 6th edition of the annual international archery circuit, organised by the World Archery Federation. The best individual and mixed performers in each discipline over the three legs then joined host representatives in qualifying for the finals.

== Competition rules and scoring ==
The compound legs consisted of a 50m qualification round of 72 arrows, followed by the compound round at 50m on a 6-zone target face, using cumulative scoring for all individual, team and mixed competitions. The top seven individual performers (with no more than two from each country), plus one host nation representative if not already qualified, proceeded to the finals; the top mixed team performer proceeded to face the host nation at the finals, which were the same competition format as the legs. The team competition was not competed at the finals.

The recurve legs consisted of a FITA qualification round, followed by a 72m Olympic set system. The top seven individual performers (with no more than two from each country), plus one host nation representative if not already qualified, proceeded to the finals; the top mixed team performer proceeded to face the host nation at the finals, which were the same competition format as the legs. The team competition was not competed at the finals.

Competitors' top three scores go towards qualification. The scores awarded in the legs were as follows:

=== Individual scoring ===
Position	Points
1st place	25
2nd place	21
3rd place	18
4th place	15
5th place	13
6th place	12
7th place	11
8th place	10
9th–16th place	5

=== Mixed team scoring ===
Position	Points
1st place	16
2nd place	12
3rd place	10
4th place	8
5th place	4
6th place	3
7th place	2
8th place	1

== Calendar ==
Stage	Date	Location
1	2–7 May	Poreč, Croatia
2	6–12 June	Antalya Centennial Archery Field, Antalya, Turkey
3	2–6 August	Ogden, United States
4	5–10 September	Shanghai, China
Final	22–23 September	Istanbul, Turkey

== Results ==
=== Recurve ===
==== Men's individual ====
Stage	Date	Location	1st place, gold medalist(s)	2nd place, silver medalist(s)	3rd place, bronze medalist(s)	Ref.
1	7 May	(Croatia) Poreč	(United States) Brady Ellison	(South Korea) Kim Woo-jin	(Ukraine) Viktor Ruban	
2	11 June	(Turkey) Antalya	(United States) Brady Ellison	(South Korea) Oh Jin-hyek	(Ukraine) Dmytro Hrachov	
3	5 August	(United States) Ogden	(United States) Brady Ellison	(Ukraine) Dmytro Hrachov	(United States) Joe Fanchin	
4	10 September	(China) Shanghai	(United States) Joe Fanchin	(Malaysia) Khairul Anuar Mohamad	(Mexico) Pedro Vivas Alcala	
Final	25 September	(Turkey) Istanbul	(United States) Brady Ellison	(China) Dai Xiaoxiang	(Ukraine) Dmytro Hrachov	

==== Women's individual ====
Stage	Date	Location	1st place, gold medalist(s)	2nd place, silver medalist(s)	3rd place, bronze medalist(s)	Ref.
1	7 May	(Croatia) Poreč	(South Korea) Han Gyeong-hee	(Italy) Pia Carmen Lionetti	(South Korea) Jung Dasomi	
2	11 June	(Turkey) Antalya	(South Korea) Jung Dasomi	(South Korea) Ki Bo-bae	(South Korea) Han Gyeong-hee	
3	5 August	(United States) Ogden	(China) Cheng Ming	(India) Deepika Kumari	(Mexico) Alejandra Valencia	
4	10 September	(China) Shanghai	(Russia) Inna Stepanova	(France) Bérengère Schuh	(India) Deepika Kumari	
Final	25 September	(Turkey) Istanbul	(China) Cheng Ming	(India) Deepika Kumari	(France) Bérengère Schuh	

==== Men's team ====
Stage	Date	Location	1st place, gold medalist(s)	2nd place, silver medalist(s)	3rd place, bronze medalist(s)	Ref.
1	7 May	(Croatia) Poreč	United States	India	South Korea	
2	12 June	(Turkey) Antalya	France	Japan	United States	
3	5 August	(United States) Ogden	United States	China	Ukraine	
4	10 September	(China) Shanghai	United States	Malaysia	France	

==== Women's team ====
Stage	Date	Location	1st place, gold medalist(s)	2nd place, silver medalist(s)	3rd place, bronze medalist(s)	Ref.
1	7 May	(Croatia) Poreč	South Korea	Russia	Germany	
2	12 June	(Turkey) Antalya	South Korea	United States	India	
3	5 August	(United States) Ogden	Ukraine	India	China	
4	10 September	(China) Shanghai	India	Italy	Mexico	

==== Mixed team ====
Stage	Date	Location	1st place, gold medalist(s)	2nd place, silver medalist(s)	3rd place, bronze medalist(s)	Ref.
1	7 May	(Croatia) Poreč	South Korea	United States	Spain	
2	12 June	(Turkey) Antalya	China	India	South Korea	
3	5 August	(United States) Ogden	United States	India	Ukraine	
4	10 September	(China) Shanghai	United States	Japan	France	
Final	25 September	(Turkey) Istanbul	South Korea	Turkey	—N/a	

=== Compound ===
==== Men's individual ====
Stage	Date	Location	1st place, gold medalist(s)	2nd place, silver medalist(s)	3rd place, bronze medalist(s)	Ref.
1	7 May	(Croatia) Poreč	(United States) Rodger Willett Jr.	(El Salvador) Jorge Jiménez	(Denmark) Martin Damsbo	
2	11 June	(Turkey) Antalya	(United States) Rodger Willett Jr.	(Iran) Amir Kazempour	(Canada) Dietmar Trillus	
3	6 August	(United States) Ogden	(United States) Rodger Willett Jr.	(United States) Braden Gellenthien	(Italy) Sergio Pagni	
4	10 September	(China) Shanghai	(United States) Reo Wilde	(Canada) Dietmar Trillus	(Mexico) Ángel Ramírez	
Final	24 September	(Turkey) Istanbul	(United States) Rodger Willett Jr.	(United States) Reo Wilde	(Italy) Sergio Pagni	

==== Women's individual ====
Stage	Date	Location	1st place, gold medalist(s)	2nd place, silver medalist(s)	3rd place, bronze medalist(s)	Ref.
1	7 May	(Croatia) Poreč	(United States) Erika Anschutz	(Russia) Viktoria Balzhanova	(Italy) Laura Longo	
2	11 June	(Turkey) Antalya	(Iran) Mahtab Parsamehr	(Croatia) Ivana Buden	(Russia) Albina Loginova	
3	6 August	(United States) Ogden	(Italy) Marcella Tonioli	(United States) Erika Anschutz	(Italy) Laura Longo	
4	10 September	(China) Shanghai	(United States) Jamie Van Natta	(United States) Erika Anschutz	(Italy) Laura Longo	
Final	24 September	(Turkey) Istanbul	(United States) Erika Anschutz	(United States) Christie Colin	(Italy) Marcella Tonioli	

==== Men's team ====
Stage	Date	Location	1st place, gold medalist(s)	2nd place, silver medalist(s)	3rd place, bronze medalist(s)	Ref.
1	7 May	(Croatia) Poreč	United States	Denmark	Iran	
2	12 June	(Turkey) Antalya	United States	Denmark	Italy	
3	6 August	(United States) Ogden	United States	Canada	Iran	
4	10 September	(China) Shanghai	United States	India	Mexico	

==== Women's team ====
Stage	Date	Location	1st place, gold medalist(s)	2nd place, silver medalist(s)	3rd place, bronze medalist(s)	Ref.
1	7 May	(Croatia) Poreč	France	Sweden	Russia	
2	12 June	(Turkey) Antalya	United States	Iran	Venezuela	
3	6 August	(United States) Ogden	United States	India	Canada	
4	10 September	(China) Shanghai	United States	Russia	Philippines	

==== Mixed team ====
Stage	Date	Location	1st place, gold medalist(s)	2nd place, silver medalist(s)	3rd place, bronze medalist(s)	Ref.
1	7 May	(Croatia) Poreč	United States	Slovenia	France	
2	12 June	(Turkey) Antalya	United States	Italy	France	
3	6 August	(United States) Ogden	United States	Italy	Denmark	
4	10 September	(China) Shanghai	Mexico	France	United States	
Final	24 September	(Turkey) Istanbul	United States	Turkey	—N/a	

== Medals table ==
Rank	Nation	Gold	Silver	Bronze	Total
1	United States	29	7	3	39
2	South Korea	6	3	4	13
3	China	3	2	1	6
4	France	2	2	5	9
5	India	1	8	2	11
6	Italy	1	4	7	12
7	Russia	1	3	2	6
8	Iran	1	2	2	5
9	Ukraine	1	1	5	7
10	Mexico	1	0	5	6
11	Canada	0	2	2	4
11	Denmark	0	2	2	4
13	Japan	0	2	0	2
13	Malaysia	0	2	0	2
13	Turkey	0	2	0	2
16	Croatia	0	1	0	1
16	El Salvador	0	1	0	1
16	Slovenia	0	1	0	1
16	Sweden	0	1	0	1
20	Germany	0	0	1	1
20	Philippines	0	0	1	1
20	Spain	0	0	1	1
20	Venezuela	0	0	1	1
Totals (23 entries)		46	46	44	136

== Qualification ==
=== Recurve ===
==== Men's individual ====
Pos.	Name	Points	(Croatia)	(Turkey)	(United States)	(China)	
1.	(United States) Brady Ellison	75	25	25	25	5	Q
2.	(United States) Joe Fanchin	48	–	5	18	25	Q
3.	(Ukraine) Dmytro Hrachov	39	–	18	21	–	Q
4.	(France) Gaël Prévost	37	–	13	13	11	Q
5.	(South Korea) Oh Jin-hyek	33	12	21	–	–	Q
6.	(Mexico) Pedro Vivas Alcala	30	–	12	–	18	Q
7.	(United States) Jake Kaminski	28	15	–	–	13	^{1}
8.	(China) Dai Xiaoxiang	25	–	15	10	–	
9.	(United Kingdom) Larry Godfrey	23	13	5	–	5	
9.	(Ukraine) Viktor Ruban	23	18	5	–	–	

^{1.} Could not qualify as national quota already reached

==== Women's individual ====
Pos.	Name	Points	(Croatia)	(Turkey)	(United States)	(China)	
1.	(South Korea) Jung Dasomi	43	18	25	–	–	Q
1.	(South Korea) Han Gyeong-hee	43	25	18	–	–	Q
3.	(India) Deepika Kumari	39	–	–	21	18	Q
4.	(Russia) Inna Stepanova	38	–	13	–	25	Q
5.	(China) Cheng Ming	37	–	–	25	12	Q
6.	(South Korea) Ki Bo-bae	36	15	21	–	–	^{1}
7.	(Mexico) Alejandra Valencia	28	–	–	18	10	Q
8.	(France) Bérengère Schuh	26	–	–	5	21	Q
9.	(Denmark) Maja Buskbjerg Jager	25	13	–	12	–	
10.	(Mongolia) Bishindee Urantungalag	23	–	12	–	11	

^{1.} Could not qualify as national quota already reached

==== Mixed team ====
Pos.	Team	Points	(Croatia)	(Turkey)	(United States)	(China)	
1.	United States	44	12	3	16	16	^{1}
2.	South Korea	26	16	10	–	–	Q
3.	China	25	–	16	1	8	
4.	India	24	–	12	12	–	
5.	France	18	4	–	4	10	

^{1.} Qualified but withdrew

=== Compound ===
==== Men's individual ====
Pos.	Name	Points	(Croatia)	(Turkey)	(United States)	(China)	
1.	(United States) Rodger Willett Jr.	75	25	25	25	10	Q
2.	(United States) Reo Wilde	53	5	13	15	25	Q
3.	(Canada) Dietmar Trillus	52	–	18	13	21	Q
4.	(United States) Braden Gellenthien	44	–	12	21	11	^{1}
5.	(El Salvador) Jorge Jiménez	38	–	21	12	5	Q
6.	(Denmark) Martin Damsbo	36	18	5	–	13	Q
7.	(Italy) Sergio Pagni	30	–	12	18	–	Q
8.	(Germany) Paul Titscher	29	13	5	11	–	Q
9.	(France) Pierre-Julien Deloche	26	–	–	13	13	
9.	(Iran) Amir Kazempour	26	–	21	5	–	

^{1.} Could not qualify as national quota already reached

==== Women's individual ====
Pos.	Name	Points	(Croatia)	(Turkey)	(United States)	(China)	
1.	(United States) Erika Anschutz	67	25	–	21	21	Q
2.	(Italy) Laura Longo	54	18	13	18	18	Q
3.	(Iran) Mahtab Parsamehr	51	11	25	15	–	Q
4.	(Italy) Marcella Tonioli	50	5	12	25	13	Q
5.	(Russia) Albina Loginova	42	13	18	10	11	Q
6.	(United States) Christie Colin	37	12	–	13	12	Q
7.	(United States) Jamie van Natta	35	5	–	5	25	^{1}
8.	(Iran) Vida Halimian	32	5	15	12	–	Q
9.	(United States) Diane Watson	30	15	–	5	10	^{1}
10.	(Russia) Viktoria Balzhanova	26	21	–	–	5	

^{1.} Could not qualify as national quota already reached

==== Mixed team ====
Pos.	Team	Points	(Croatia)	(Turkey)	(United States)	(China)	
1.	United States	48	16	16	16	12	Q
2.	France	32	10	10	8	12	
2.	Italy	32	3	12	12	8	
4.	Mexico	18	–	–	2	16	
5.	Russia	16	8	4	–	4	
5.	Iran	16	4	8	4	–	

=== Nations ranking ===
Pos.	Nation	Points	(Croatia)	(Turkey)	(United States)	(China)
1.	United States	1135	230	257	330	318
2.	India	395	73	38	149	135
3.	France	383	64	108	108	103
4.	Italy	340	89	89	86	76
5.	South Korea	324	178	146	–	–
6.	Russia	291	133	40	10	108
7.	Iran	238	58	106	74	–
8.	Ukraine	223	43	53	127	–
9.	Mexico	211	10	17	42	142
10.	China	183	–	31	117	35

== World Cup Final ==
=== Recurve ===
==== Men's individual ====
Quarterfinals
1	(United States) Brady Ellison	2	2	2
8	(Turkey) Yağız Yılmaz	0	0	0
5	(South Korea) Oh Jin-hyek	2	0	0	0
4	(France) Gaël Prévost	0	2	2	2
3	(Ukraine) Dmytro Hrachov	0	2	2	2
6	(Mexico) Pedro Vivas Alcala	2	0	0	0
7	(China) Dai Xiaoxiang	0	2	1	2	1
2	(United States) Joe Fanchin	2	0	1	0	1

Semifinals
1	(United States) Brady Ellison	2	0	2	0	2
4	(France) Gaël Prévost	0	2	0	2	0
3	(Ukraine) Dmytro Hrachov	2	0	0	0
7	(China) Dai Xiaoxiang	0	2	2	2

Finals
1	(United States) Brady Ellison	2	1	1	2
7	(China) Dai Xiaoxiang	0	1	1	0
Third place
4	(France) Gaël Prévost	1	0	2	0	0
3	(Ukraine) Dmytro Hrachov	1	2	0	2	2

==== Women's individual ====
Quarterfinals
1	(South Korea) Jung Dasomi	0	2	2	2
8	(Turkey) Natalia Nasaridze	2	0	0	0
5	(China) Cheng Ming	2	0	0	2	2
4	(Russia) Inna Stepanova	0	2	2	0	0
3	(India) Deepika Kumari	2	1	0	1	2
6	(Mexico) Alejandra Valencia	0	1	2	1	0
7	(France) Bérengère Schuh	2	0	2	1	1
2	(South Korea) Han Gyeong-hee	0	2	0	1	1

Semifinals
1	(South Korea) Jung Dasomi	0	0	2	0
5	(China) Cheng Ming	2	2	0	2
3	(India) Deepika Kumari	2	2	2
7	(France) Bérengère Schuh	0	0	0

Finals
5	(China) Cheng Ming	2	0	0	2	1^{1}
3	(India) Deepika Kumari	0	2	2	0	1^{0}
Third place
1	(South Korea) Jung Dasomi	0	2	0	0
7	(France) Bérengère Schuh	2	0	2	2

==== Mixed team ====
Finals
1	South Korea; Jung Dasomi; Oh Jin-hyek	147
2	Turkey; Natalia Nasaridze; Yağız Yılmaz	138

=== Compound ===
==== Men's individual ====
Quarterfinals
1	(United States) Rodger Willett Jr.	143
8	(Turkey) Ali Davarci	142
5	(Denmark) Martin Damsbo	142
4	(El Salvador) Jorge Jiménez	143
3	(Canada) Dietmar Trillus	144
6	(Italy) Sergio Pagni	145
7	(Germany) Paul Titscher	139
2	(United States) Reo Wilde	143

Semifinals
1	(United States) Rodger Willett Jr.	142
4	(El Salvador) Jorge Jiménez	137
6	(Italy) Sergio Pagni	138
2	(United States) Reo Wilde	142

Finals
1	(United States) Rodger Willett Jr.	143
2	(United States) Reo Wilde	141
Third place
4	(El Salvador) Jorge Jiménez	141^{10}
6	(Italy) Sergio Pagni	141^{10*}

==== Women's individual ====
Quarterfinals
1	(United States) Erika Anschutz	143
8	(Turkey) Gizem Kocaman	135
5	(Russia) Albina Loginova	137
4	(Italy) Marcella Tonioli	138
3	(Iran) Mahtab Parsamehr	120
6	(United States) Christie Colin	142
7	(Iran) Vida Halimian	139^{10*}
2	(Italy) Laura Longo	139^{10}

Semifinals
1	(United States) Erika Anschutz	143
4	(Italy) Marcella Tonioli	139
6	(United States) Christie Colin	136
7	(Iran) Vida Halimian	131

Finals
1	(United States) Erika Anschutz	142
6	(United States) Christie Colin	138
Third place
4	(Italy) Marcella Tonioli	136
7	(Iran) Vida Halimian	135

==== Mixed team ====
Finals
1	United States; Christie Colin; Rodger Willett Jr.	147
2	Turkey; Gizem Kocaman; Ali Davarci	143
