= 2012 Pan American Archery Championships =

The 2012 Pan American Archery Championships was held in San Salvador, El Salvador from May 21 to 26, 2012.

== Medal summary ==
=== Recurve ===
Event	Gold	Silver	Bronze
Men's individual	Elias Malave (VEN)	Dan Schuller (USA)	Nicholas Kale (USA)
Women's individual	Denisse Van Lamoen (CHI)	Ana Rendón (COL)	Leidys Brito (VEN)
Men's team	United States; Dan Schuller; Nicholas Kale; Jeff Anderson	El Salvador; Oscar Ticas; Miguel Angel Veliz; Cristobal Merlos	Venezuela; Elias Malave; Francisco Ladera; Yolmar Pinto
Women's team	Colombia; Ana Rendón; Natalia Sánchez; Maria Victoria Echavarria	Argentina; Maria Gabriel Goni; Virginia Conti; Fernanda Faisal	Venezuela; Leidys Brito; Lisbeth Leoni; Yerubi Suarez

=== Compound ===
Event	Gold	Silver	Bronze
Men's individual	Jorge Jimenez; El Salvador	Rodger Willett; United States	Duane Price; United States
Women's individual	Olga Bosch; Venezuela	Linda Ochoa; Mexico	Ana Mendoza; Venezuela
Men's team	United States; Rodger Willett; Duane Price; Henry Bass	El Salvador; Jorge Jimenez; Roberto Hernandez; Rigoberto Hernandez	Brazil; Marcelo Roriz; Rogerio Ambrosio; Claudio Contrucci
Women's team	Venezuela; Olga Bosch; Ana Mendoza; Jhoaneth Leal	United States; Samantha Neal; Paige Pearce; Sarah Lance	Mexico; Linda Ochoa; Stephanie Salinas; Ana Crisanto
