= Jung Dasomi =

South Korean archer (born 1990)

Personal information
- Born: 23 November 1990 (age 35)

Sport
- Country: South Korea
- Sport: Archery
- Event: Recurve

Achievements and titles
- Highest world ranking: No. 1
Medal record
Women's recurve archery
Representing South Korea
World Championships
Bronze medal – third place	2011 Turin	Team
Asian Games
Gold medal – first place	2014 Incheon	Individual
Gold medal – first place	2014 Incheon	Team
Asian Championships
Gold medal – first place	2013 Taipei	Team
Silver medal – second place	2013 Taipei	Individual
Bronze medal – third place	2021 Dhaka	Individual
World Cup Final
Gold medal – first place	2011 Istanbul	Mixed Team
Summer Universiade
Gold medal – first place	2011 Shenzhen	Team
Silver medal – second place	2011 Shenzhen	Individual

Korean name
- Hangul: 정다소미
- RR: Jeong Dasomi
- MR: Chŏng Tasomi

Jung Dasomi (Korean: 정다소미; born 23 November 1990) is an archer from South Korea who specialises in recurve archery. Jung made a highly successful debut in international archery in 2011, winning medals at the World Archery Championships, Archery World Cup and Summer Universiade, and concluding the year as the number one-ranked female recurve archer in the World Archery Rankings. She won two further medals in 2014 at the Asian Games before a downturn in form relegated her from the national team. Jung did not return to international archery competitions until 2018.

== Career ==
=== 2011: Breakthrough debut ===
Jung made her debut as a member of the Korean national team in 2011. She achieved her first medals at a major international tournament in the opening stage of that year's Archery World Cup, where she won gold in the women's team and mixed team events and bronze in the women's individual event. Her first individual title came one month later at the tournament's second stage in June after defeating her Korean teammate Ki Bo-bae in the final, with whom she also won a second gold medal in the women's team event.

Jung's first appearance at the World Archery Championships held in July was however less successful. Her involvement in the women's individual competition ended in the quarter-finals when she suffered an unexpected loss against Georgia's Kristine Esebua, and in the women's team event a surprise semi-final defeat to India saw Jung and teammates Ki and Han Gyeong-hee finish with the bronze medal. The following month Jung won two medals at the Summer Universiade in August, securing another team gold with Ki and Han before concluding the women's individual event with the silver medal as runner-up to Ki.

In September Jung contested the World Cup finals, for which she had qualified with her individual victory in the second stage in June. Jung was defeated by France's Bérengère Schuh in the bronze medal match of the individual competition, but later won gold in the mixed team event partnered with Oh Jin Hyek. Her final tournament of the year was the London Archery Classic in October, an event held as a practice competition for the forthcoming 2012 Summer Olympics. Gold medals in both the women's individual and team competitions, combined with her performances through the year, saw her conclude 2011 at the top of the World Archery Rankings as the women's recurve number one.

=== 2012–2018: Double Asian gold and hiatus ===
Jung failed to qualify for the 2012 Summer Olympics. She did not return to the international stage until May 2014 when she contested the second stage of the 2014 Archery World Cup. Described by the World Archery Federation as one of two "massive wildcards" in the Korean squad due to her extended break from the team prior to the tournament, Jung went onto to win gold in the women's individual event, but was eliminated in the opening round at the World Cup finals held later in the year.

Jung's biggest success of 2014 came at the Asian Games in September. Entering the tournament ranked as the women's recurve world number two, she defeated teammate Chang Hye-Jin in the final to win the individual gold medal, and later partnered Chang and Lee Tuk-young to secure a second gold in the women's team competition. Her performances at the Games was recognised by the Korean Archery Association, who named her the best archer of 2014. She was additionally named as the runner-up in the World Archery Federation's poll for the female recurve Athlete of the Year for 2014.

Jung would not qualify for the national team again until 2018 after a three-year spell of poor performances, and was selected to compete in the 2018 Asian Games in Jakarta.

== See also ==
- Korean archery
- List of South Korean archers
