= Ladies First (2017 film) =

2017 Indian documentary

- Directed by: Uraaz Bahl; Shaana Levy Bahl
- Cinematography: John W. Rutland
- Edited by: Avdhesh Mohla
- Production company: Red Ladder
- Distributed by: Netflix
- Release dates: 7 July 2017 (Los Angeles); 8 March 2018
- Running time: 40 minutes
- Country: India
- Language: Hindi

Ladies First is a 2017 Indian documentary on the life of Archer Deepika Kumari. Directed by Uraaz Bahl and Shaana Levy Bahl, it chronicles her journey through living in poverty in Jharkhand, to later getting enrolled in the Tata Archery Academy and representing India at several international tournaments. It won an award at the London Independent Film Festival, the Best Documentary award at the New York Film Awards and Best Inspirational Film at the Los Angeles Film Awards. It was screened at the 2017 Evolution Mallorca International Film Festival.

It was shot over the course of three years leading up to the 2016 Summer Olympics. Ladies First was released on 8 March 2018 on the eve of International Women's Day on Netflix. It was the first Netflix original documentary from India and released with subtitles in 28 different languages. The documentary was also screened for Magic Bus NGO.

== Production ==
The husband wife duo of Uraaz Bahl and Shaana Levy Bahl read an article about Deepika Kumari. Shaana said that "there was something about her struggle that struck a chord with Uraaz." They then decided to make a documentary on her. Kumari was initially not interested in it and said that " [the time] was so close to the Olympics and I was extremely busy and fully focused on my training." The crew travelled with her to Mumbai, Bengaluru, and Delhi where she and other athletes were given an official send-off by the prime minister for the 2016 Olympic Games. The shoot began a few months before the Olympics in August 2016 and was finished in seven months after the games ended.

== Reception ==
John Stanley of World Archery Federation called it a "short, but beautifully-filmed piece which uses Rio as a frame to take the audience through Deepika’s remarkable career so far." Suhani Singh of India Today felt that the documentary focused "more on Kumari's origins story than demonstrating her impressive exploits on the field." A review carried by the IANS wrote: "We never get to know Deepika's inner feelings as she struggled against gender prejudices and her destiny of poverty. It's like getting vivid glimpses of landscape from a moving train."
