= Yun Ok-hee =

South Korean archer (born 1985)

Medal record

Women's recurve archery

Representing South Korea

Olympic Games
Gold medal – first place	2008 Beijing	Team
Bronze medal – third place	2008 Beijing	Individual

World Championships
Gold medal – first place	2009 Ulsan	Team
Gold medal – first place	2013 Belek	Team
Bronze medal – third place	2013 Belek	Individual

World Cup Final
Gold medal – first place	2010 Edinburgh	Individual
Gold medal – first place	2013 Paris	Individual
Gold medal – first place	2013 Paris	Mixed team
Bronze medal – third place	2008 Lausanne	Individual
Bronze medal – third place	2009 Copenhagen	Individual

Asian Games
Gold medal – first place	2006 Doha	Team
Gold medal – first place	2010 Guangzhou	Individual
Gold medal – first place	2010 Guangzhou	Team
Silver medal – second place	2006 Doha	Individual

Asian Championships
Gold medal – first place	2007 Xi'an	Team
Silver medal – second place	2005 New Delhi	Individual
Silver medal – second place	2005 New Delhi	Team

- Yun Ok-hee
- Hangul: 윤옥희
- Hanja: 尹玉姬
- RR: Yun Okhui
- MR: Yun Okhŭi

Yun Ok-hee (Korean: 윤옥희; Hanja: 尹玉姬, Korean pronunciation: [jun.o.kʰi]; born 1 March 1985) is a South Korean archer, who won the gold medal in the team and a silver in the individual competition at the 2006 Asian Games and is a former world number one.

== 2008 Summer Olympics ==
At the 2008 Summer Olympics in Beijing Yun finished her ranking round with a total of 667 points, six points behind ranking leader Park Sung-hyun. This gave her the second seed for the final competition bracket in which she faced Albina Kamaltdinova in the first round, beating the archer from Tajikistan 109-102. In the second round, Yun was too strong for Marie-Pier Beaudet (114-107) and via Chen Ling (113-103) in the third round she advanced to the quarter-finals. There she had no problem beating Khatuna Lorig 111-105. In the semi-final however, she was unable to win against the local Chinese favourite Zhang Juanjuan who equaled the newly set Olympic Record by Park Sung-Hyun of 115 points earlier that day. Yun's 109 points were not enough to advance to the final. In the bronze medal match, she scored another 109 points and this time it was good enough to beat North Korean Kwon Un-sil who scored 106 points.

Together with Park Sung-hyun and Joo Hyun-jung she also took part in the team event. With her 667 score from the ranking round combined with the 673 of Park and the 664 of Joo the South Korean team was in first position after the ranking round, which gave them a straight seed into the quarter-finals. With 231-217 they were far too strong for the Italian team. The 231 also was a new World Record. In the semi-final against France they scored 213 points with the French scoring 184, securing their final spot. Opponent China came with a strong 215 points performance, but South Korea won the gold with a 224 points score.

== Asian Games ==
She competed at the 2006 Asian Games, where she won a gold medal in the team event and a silver in the individual, and at the 2010 Asian Games where she won gold medals in the individual and team events.

== 2013 comeback ==
In 2013, Yun was again selected for the South Korean team after two years of absence. She achieved great success, reaching the semi-finals of the 2013 World Archery Championships, winning two stages of the 2013 Archery World Cup and, on 22 September 2013, she defeated Deepika Kumari from India with a score of 6-4 to win the 2013 Archery World Cup Final, ending the year again as the number one ranked archer in the world.

== Individual performance timeline ==
Tournament	2006	2007	2008	2009	2010	2011	2012	2013	2014	SR
World Archery tournaments
Olympic Games			3rd							0/1
World Championships				QF				3rd		0/2
World Cup										
Stage 1		3rd						W		1/2
Stage 2	4th		W					2nd		1/3
Stage 3			W	2nd	3rd					1/3
Stage 4	W		2nd	W	3rd			W		3/5
World Cup Final	DNQ	DNQ	3rd	3rd	W			W		2/4
End of year world ranking	2	9	1	1	1	24		1		

== See also ==
- Korean archery
- Archery
- List of South Korean archers
