= Rodger Willett Jr. =

American archer (born 1962)

Medal record

Men's compound archery

Representing United States

World Championships
Gold medal – first place	2007 Leipzig	Team

World Cup
Gold medal – first place	2011 Istanbul	Individual
Bronze medal – third place	2010 Edinburgh	Individual

Pan American Championships
Gold medal – first place	2012 San Salvador	Team
Silver medal – second place	2012 San Salvador	Individual

Rodger Willett Jr. (born 16 September 1962) is an athlete from the United States who competes in compound archery.

Willett was born in Hampton, Virginia. He took up archery in 1987 and first represented the United States senior team in 2007. He has since been ranked number one in the world and has won individual and team golds at the Arizona Cup, as well as an individual World Cup final (including three of the four qualification stages) and a team World Archery Championships title.

Rodger Willett Jr. is an active hunter, and over the years has successfully hunted elk, deer and turkey. Today, his hunting efforts focus primarily on predator hunting and helping his neighbors with their coyote and bobcat problem. Rodger is also a free-diver. He enjoys spearfishing with his friends when he is not shooting his bow, and has the ability to hold his breath for up to 4 minutes.

Currently he is a part of the Mathews Bow company and continues to compete on a national level. His focus as of late has been to revisit 3-D archery, which is where he started before getting involved in the FITA tournaments. Making appearances at all the ASA and IBO tournaments, in 2018 he made the podium twice, as well as picked up third at the Redding shoot in California.

He started out the 2019 season strong. He was the only archer in his class to clean the first day at the ISAA Pro Am tournament in January. From there, he went on to make the shoot-down at the first ASA shoot this year in Foley, Alabama.

Although his success in archery helps to bring in a paycheck, his full time day job is an arborist. A highly skilled tree climber, Rodger is often called upon to do jobs that are dangerous.
