= Deepika Kumari =

Indian archer and Olympian

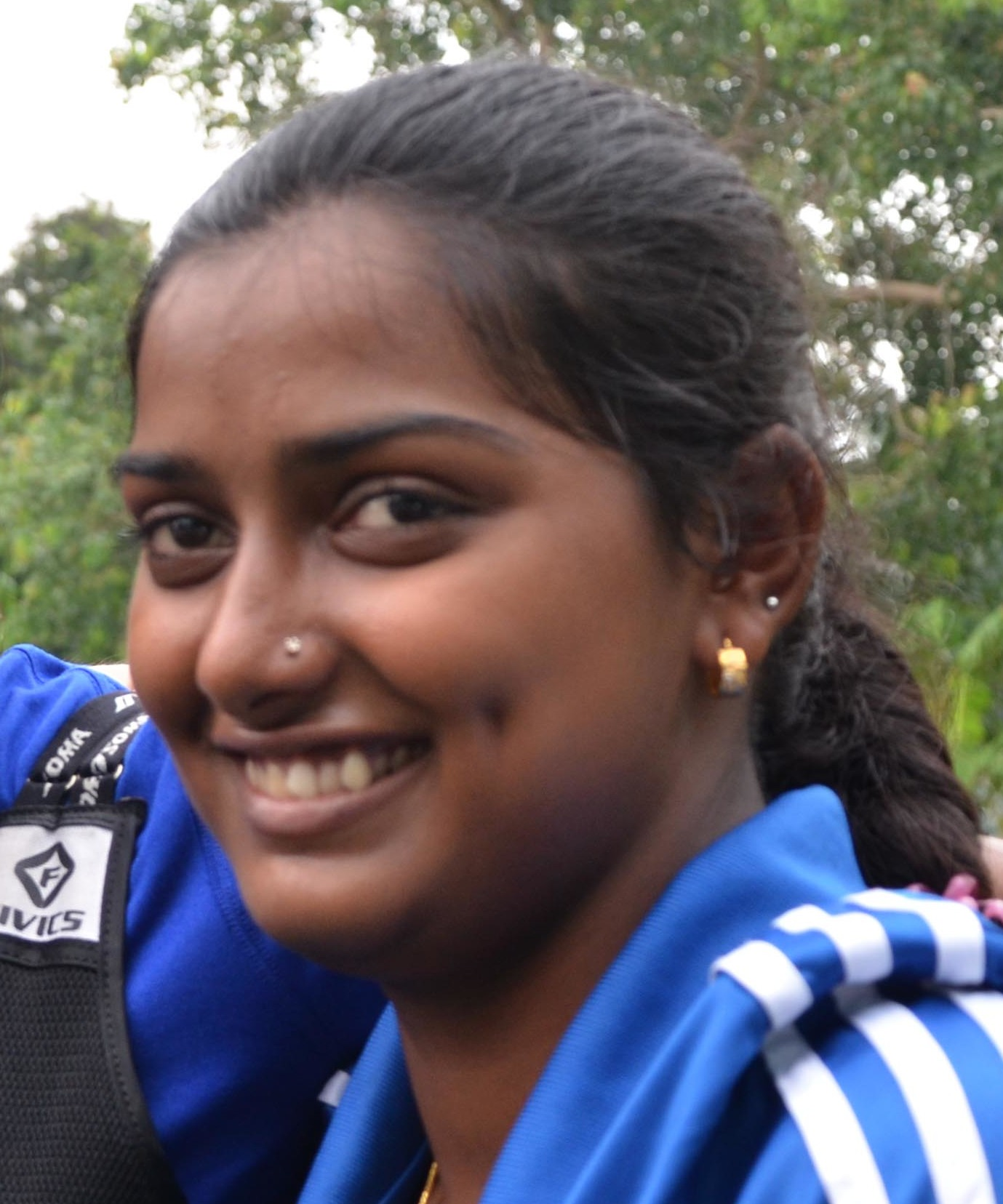
- Deepika Kumari in 2012

Personal information
- Nationality: Indian
- Born: 13 June 1994 (age 32) Ratu Chatti, Jharkhand, India
- Height: 1.62 m (5 ft 4 in)
- Weight: 56 kg (123 lb)
- Spouse: Atanu Das (m. 2020)

Sport
- Sport: Archery
- Event: Recurve
- Turned pro: 2006

Achievements and titles
- Highest world ranking: 1 (2012)
Medal record
Women's recurve archery
Representing India
Event	1st	2nd	3rd
World Championships	0	2	0
World Cup Final	0	5	1
Commonwealth Games	2	0	0
Asian Games	0	0	1
Asian Championships	1	1	4
World Cup	12	13	8
Asia Cup	4	1	0
World Youth Championships	2	0	1
Total	21	22	15
World Championships
Silver medal – second place	2011 Turin	Team
Silver medal – second place	2015 Copenhagen	Team
World Cup Final
Silver medal – second place	2011 Istanbul	Individual
Silver medal – second place	2012 Tokyo	Individual
Silver medal – second place	2013 Paris	Individual
Silver medal – second place	2015 Mexico City	Individual
Silver medal – second place	2024 Tlaxcala	Individual
Bronze medal – third place	2018 Samsun	Individual
Commonwealth Games
Gold medal – first place	2010 Delhi	Individual
Gold medal – first place	2010 Delhi	Team
Asian Games
Bronze medal – third place	2010 Guangzhou	Team
Asian Championships
Gold medal – first place	2013 Taipei	Mixed team
Silver medal – second place	2015 Bangkok	Team
Bronze medal – third place	2011 Tehran	Team
Bronze medal – third place	2015 Bangkok	Mixed team
Bronze medal – third place	2019 Bangkok	Mixed team
Bronze medal – third place	2019 Bangkok	Team
World Cup
Gold medal – first place	2011 Shanghai	Team
Gold medal – first place	2012 Antalya	Individual
Gold medal – first place	2013 Medellín	Team
Gold medal – first place	2013 Wrocław	Team
Gold medal – first place	2014 Wrocław	Team
Gold medal – first place	2018 Salt Lake City	Individual
Gold medal – first place	2021 Guatemala City	Individual
Gold medal – first place	2021 Paris	Individual
Gold medal – first place	2021 Guatemala City	Team
Gold medal – first place	2021 Paris	Team
Gold medal – first place	2021 Paris	Mixed team
Gold medal – first place	2026 Shanghai	Team
Silver medal – second place	2010 Shanghai	Individual
Silver medal – second place	2010 Ogden	Team
Silver medal – second place	2011 Ogden	Individual
Silver medal – second place	2011 Ogden	Team
Silver medal – second place	2011 Antalya	Mixed team
Silver medal – second place	2011 Ogden	Mixed team
Silver medal – second place	2012 Shanghai	Team
Silver medal – second place	2013 Shanghai	Individual
Silver medal – second place	2013 Shanghai	Mixed team
Silver medal – second place	2015 Wrocław	Mixed team
Silver medal – second place	2016 Shanghai	Team
Silver medal – second place	2016 Antalya	Mixed team
Silver medal – second place	2024 Shanghai	Individual
Bronze medal – third place	2011 Shanghai	Individual
Bronze medal – third place	2011 Antalya	Team
Bronze medal – third place	2013 Medellín	Mixed team
Bronze medal – third place	2014 Wrocław	Individual
Bronze medal – third place	2014 Wrocław	Mixed team
Bronze medal – third place	2015 Antalya	Individual
Bronze medal – third place	2016 Shanghai	Mixed team
Bronze medal – third place	2025 Shanghai	Individual
Asia Cup
Gold medal – first place	2010 Bangkok	Individual
Gold medal – first place	2010 Bangkok	Team
Gold medal – first place	2024 Baghdad	Individual
Gold medal – first place	2024 Baghdad	Team
Silver medal – second place	2012 Bangkok	Team
World Youth Championships
Gold medal – first place	2009 Ogden	Individual
Gold medal – first place	2011 Legnica	Individual
Bronze medal – third place	2011 Legnica	Team

Deepika Kumari (born 13 June 1994) is an Indian recurve archer. A four-time Olympian and two-time World Championships silver medallist, Deepika is one of the most decorated Indian recurve archer and the first Indian archer to rise to the top of the world rankings, reaching the World No.1 ranking in 2012. She has been honored with the Arjuna Award in 2012 and the Padma Shri in 2016, for her contribution to Indian sports.

== Early life ==
Deepika Kumari was born in Ranchi, Bihar (now Jharkhand) to Shiv Charan Prajapati, an auto-rickshaw driver, and Geeta, a nurse at Ranchi Medical College, and a native of Ratu Chatti village, 15 km from Ranchi. She belongs to a Prajapati family.

As a child, she practised aiming for mangoes with stones. During her early days it was difficult for her parents to financially support Deepika's dream, often compromising on the family budget to buy her new equipment for her training; as a result, Deepika practised archery using homemade bamboo bows and arrows. Deepika's cousin Vidya Kumari, then an archer residing at Tata Archery Academy, helped her develop her talent.

== Career ==
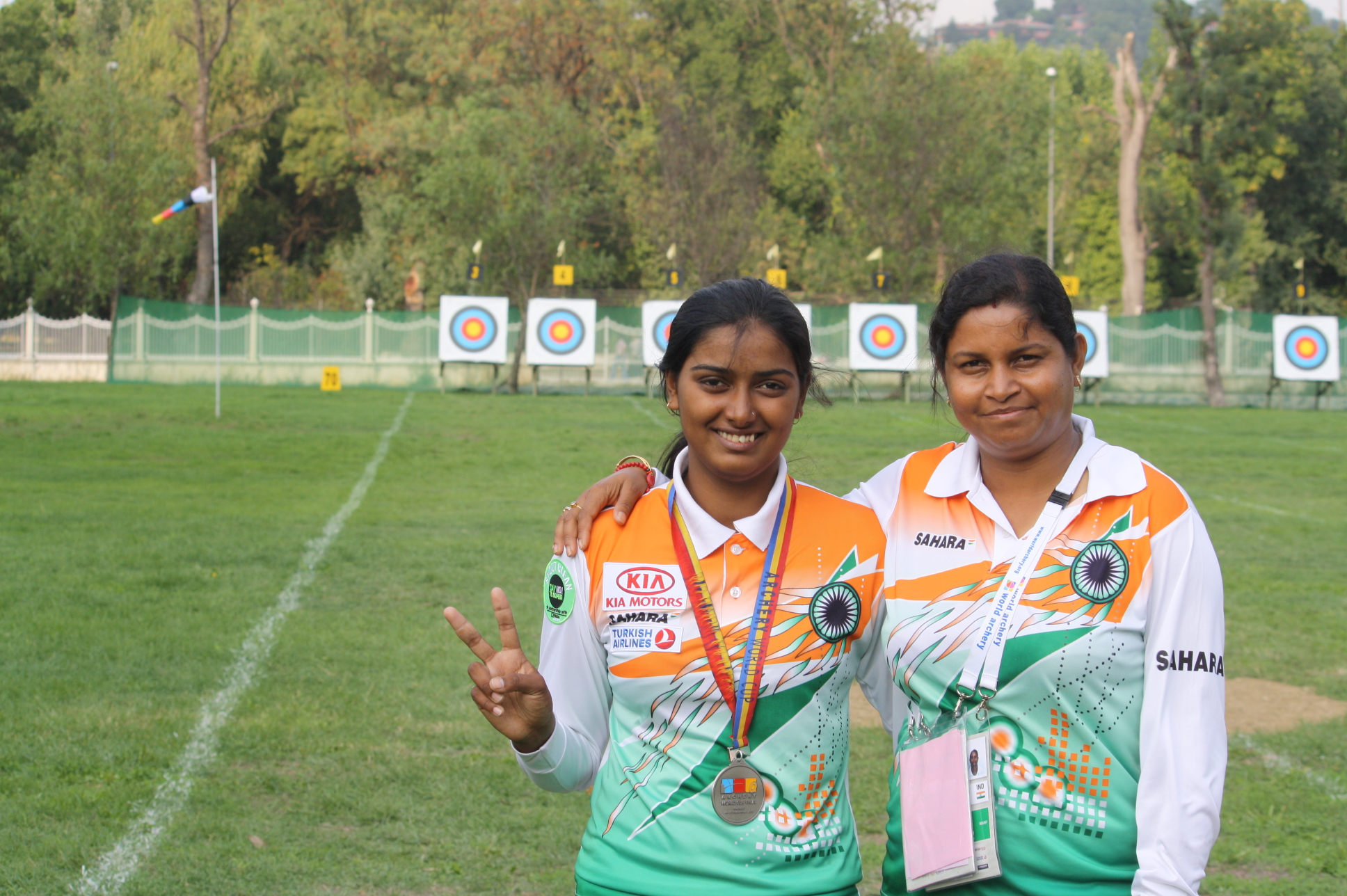
Deepika Kumari in 2011, with Purnima Mahato

Deepika made her first breakthrough in 2005 when she entered the Arjun Archery Academy at Kharsawan, an institute set up by Meera Munda, wife of Jharkhand's chief minister Arjun Munda. But her professional archery journey began in the year 2006 when she joined the Tata Archery Academy in Jamshedpur. It was here that she started her training with both the proper equipment as well as a uniform. She also received ₹500 as a stipend. Deepika returned home once in her first three years there, only after having won the Cadet World Championship title in November 2009. Kumari has long been seen as the one to finally get India its first medal in archery.

== Personal life ==
Deepika married archer Atanu Das on 30 June 2020. Their daughter, Vedika, was born in December 2022.

== Achievements ==
Deepika became the second Indian to win the title after Palton Hansda won the junior compound competition at the 2006 Archery World Cup in Mérida, Mexico.

She won the 11th Youth World Archery Championship held in Ogden, Utah, United States in 2009, at the age of fifteen. She also won a gold medal in the same competition in the women's team recurve event, alongside Dola Banerjee and Bombayala Devi.

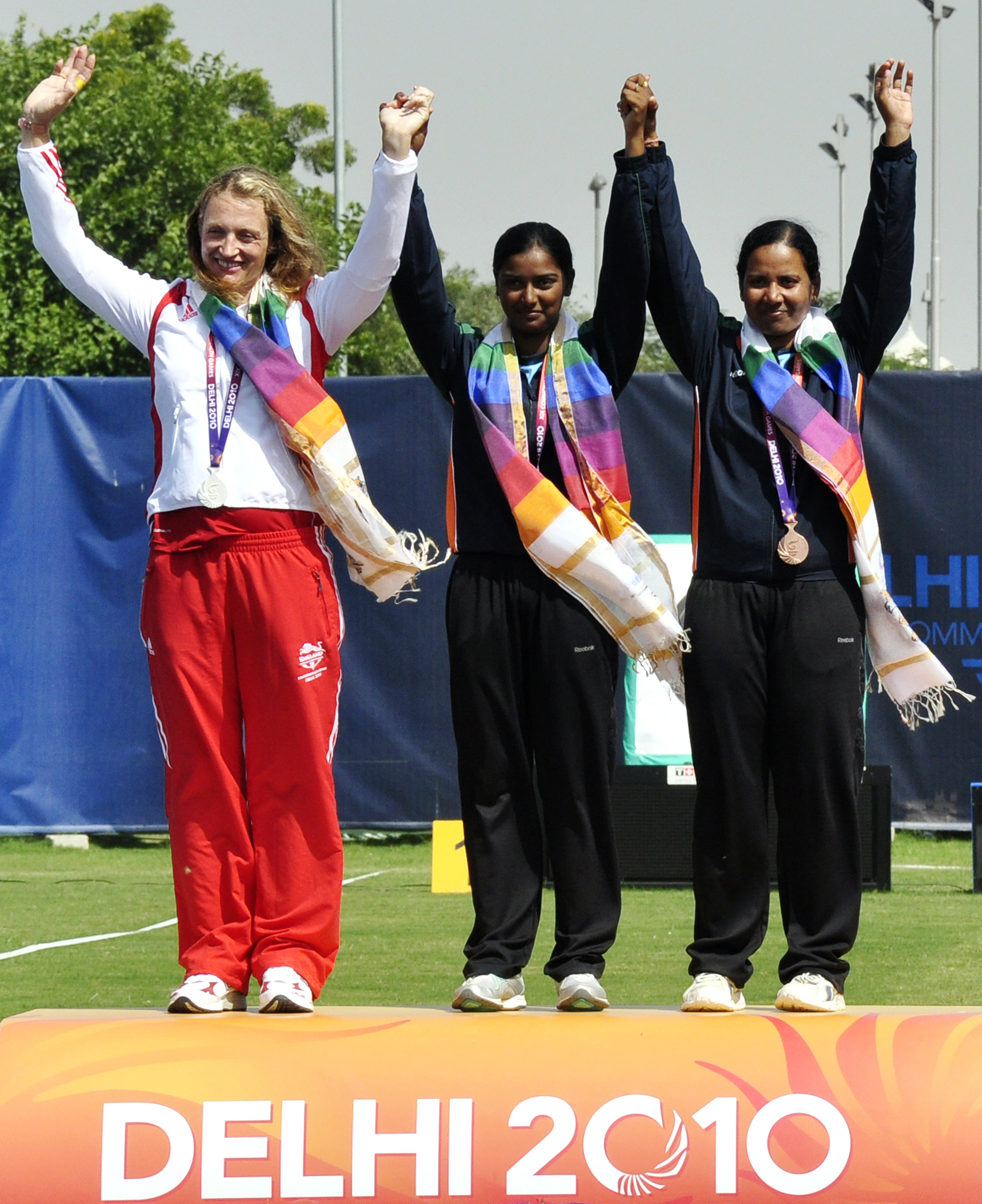
Deepika Kumari of India (Gold), Alison Jane Williamson of England (Silver) and Dola Banerjee of India (Bronze) during the 2010 Delhi Archery (Women's Individual Recurve) medal presentation ceremony at XIX Commonwealth Games.

At the Delhi Commonwealth games 2010, Deepika won two gold medals, one in the individual event and the other in the women's team recurve event. For this, she was honoured with the Outstanding Performance at CWG (Female) Award at the 2010 Sahara Sports Awards ceremony.

Later at the Asian Games of 2010, held in Guangzhou, China, Deepika missed out on a medal after she lost to Kwon Un Sil of North Korea in the bronze-medal play-off of the women's individual archery event. But as a part of the Indian archery recurve team, along with Rimil Buriuly and Dola Banerjee, Deepika edged out Chinese Taipei 218–217 in the bronze play-off to ensure a podium finish at the Aoti Archery Range.

In May 2012, Deepika Kumari won her first World Cup individual stage recurve gold medal at Antalya, Turkey. She beat Korea's Lee Sung-Jin by six set points to four in the final. Later in 2012, she would go on to become world no. 1 in Women's Recurve Archery. In London Olympics 2012, Deepika Kumari lost against Amy Oliver of Great Britain in the opening round, attributing a relatively poor performance to fever and high winds.

On 22 July 2013, she won the gold medal in Archery World Cup stage 3 held at Medellin, Colombia where India finished fourth. On 22 September 2013, Deepika lost 4–6 to Yun Ok-Hee of South Korea & settled for silver medal in 2013 FITA Archery World Cup. This was her 3rd Silver medal in as many appearances in the World Cup Final.

In 2014, Deepika was featured by Forbes (India) as one of their '30 under 30'. However, she failed to make the Indian team for 2014 after finishing outside the top 4 at the national qualifications.

In 2015, Deepika's first medal came at the second stage of the World Cup, where she won a bronze in the individual event. At the World Championships in Copenhagen, she won a team silver along with Laxmirani Majhi and Rimil Buriuly, after narrowly losing out on a gold in a match against Russia which they conceded 4–5 in a shoot-off. In the latter half of this year, she won the silver medal in the World Cup final. In November 2015, she won a bronze medal in the Asian Championships with Jayanta Talukdar in the Recurve Mixed Team event.

In April 2016, at the first stage of the World Cup in Shanghai, Deepika equaled the Ki Bo-bae's world record of (686/720) in the women's recurve event.

Deepika Kumari was the part of the team that qualified for 2016 Rio Olympics. The Indian women's recursive team, consisting of Deepika Kumari, Bombayla Devi Laishram and Laxmirani Majhi, finished 7th in the ranking round. The team won their match against Colombia in the round of 16 before losing the quarterfinal match against Russia.

In the women's Individual archery, Deepika Kumari produced a stellar performance in the round of 64 against Kristine Esebua of Georgia. Deepika won this round with a score of 6–4. In the next round, Deepika had a much-easier outing against Guendalina Sartori of Italy. Deepika started badly and lost the first round but won the next three to ease through 6–2 in the end. However, in the round of 16, Deepika went down to Taipei's Tan Ya-ting with a score of 0 against 6.

In November 2019, Deepika Kumari secured an Olympic quota at the Continental Qualification Tournament being held on the sidelines of the 21st Asian Archery Championships in Bangkok. Deepika Kumari India won 3 gold medals in the Archery's World Cup Stage 3 tournament in Paris 2021. She thus recorded the 13th triple gold and became the 11th archer to achieve the feat – in the 15-year history of the Hyundai Archery World Cup.

== In popular culture ==
A biographical documentary called Ladies First, released in 2017, was made by Uraaz Bahl and his wife Shaana Levy-Bahl. The movie won at the London Independent Film Festival and was screened at the Mallorca Film Festival in October 2017. Ladies First has also been submitted for the Short Documentary category at the Academy Awards.

This documentary was also screened for Maneka Gandhi, the Union Cabinet Minister for Women and Child Development, with an aim to increase awareness about women in sports in India.

== Awards ==
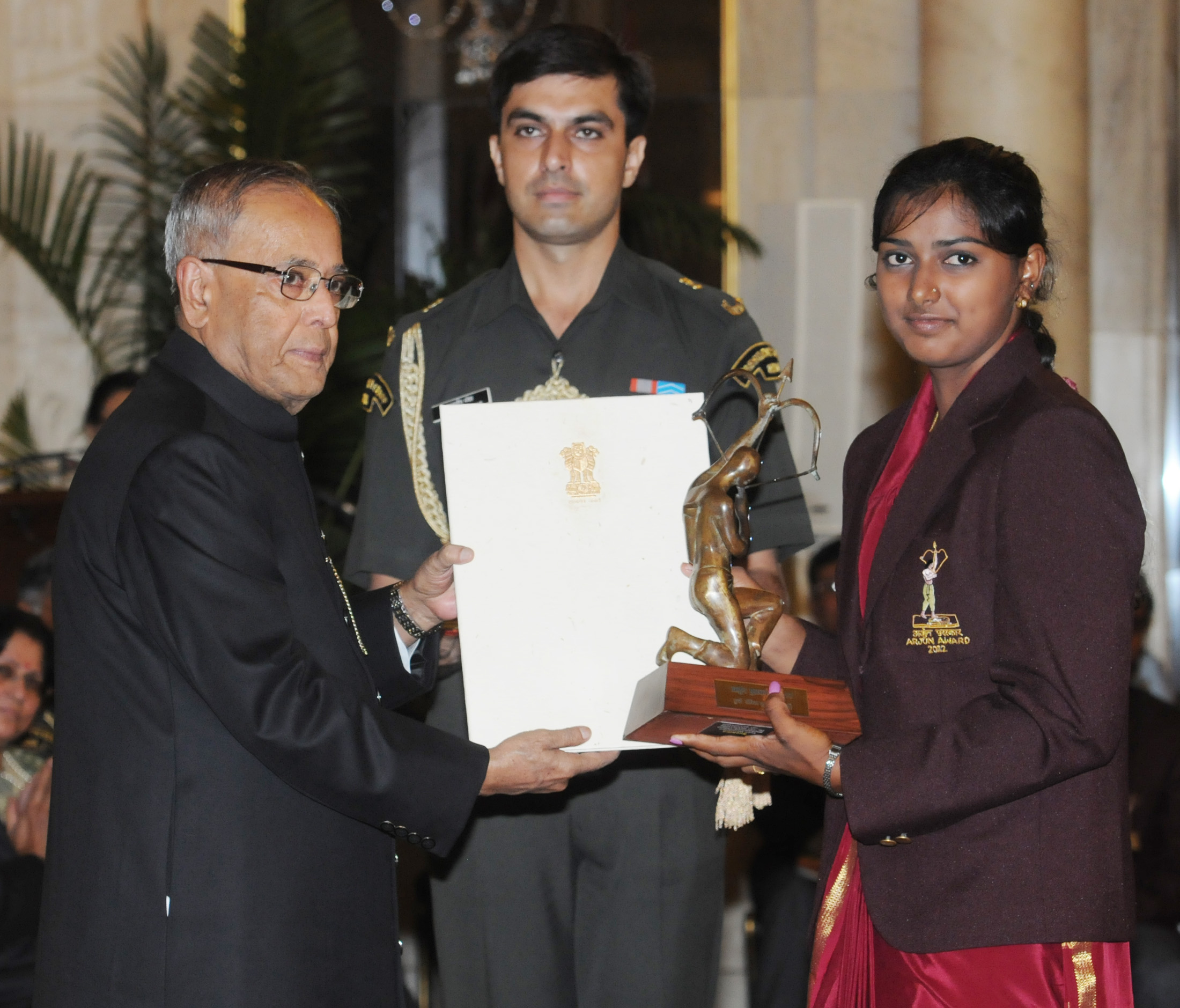
Then President, Pranab Mukherjee, presenting the Arjuna Award for the year 2012 to Deepika Kumari for Archery, in a glittering ceremony, at the Rashtrapati Bhavan, in New Delhi on 29 August 2012.

Year	Award	Notes
2012	Arjuna Award	
2014	FICCI Sportsperson of the Year Award	
2016	Padma Shri	
2017	Young Achievers Award	Felicitated by Vogue

== Individual performance timeline ==
Tournament	2010	2011	2012	2013	2014	2015	2016	2017	2018	2019	2021	2024	SR
World Archery tournaments
Olympic Games			1R				3R				QF	QF	0/4
World Championships		3R		3R		3R		2R		3R			0/5
World Cup													
Stage 1		3R	QF	2nd		3R	QF	QF	4R		W	2nd	3/9
Stage 2	QF	3R	W	2R	3R	3rd		4th	QF			4th	2/8
Stage 3	3R	2nd		QF		4R	4R		W	4R	W	4R	3/9
Stage 4	2nd	3rd		QF	3rd			QF	3rd	4R			3/7
World Cup Final	QF	2nd	2nd	2nd	DNQ	2nd	DNQ	DNQ	3rd	DNQ	4th	2nd	6/8
