= Han Gyeong-hee =

South Korean archer

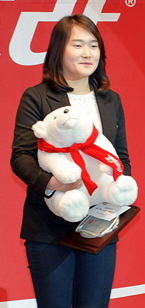
- Han Gyeong-hee from Acrofan

Personal information
- Born: 9 July 1992 (age 33) South Korea
Medal record
Women's archery
Representing South Korea
Summer Universiade
Gold medal – first place	2011 Shenzhen	Team

Han Gyeong-hee (Korean: 한경희; born 9 July 1992) is a South Korean archer. She represented the Korean national women's team from 2009 to 2011.

Han was part of the women's teams that won the London Archery Classic, the test event for the 2012 Olympics, the 2011 Summer Universiade, the 2009 Youth Archery World Championships, and stages one and two of the 2011 Archery World Cup. She also won the individual championship of stage one of the 2011 Archery World Cup, and achieved a career high ranking of no. 2 in September 2011.
