= Ashley Wallace =

Canadian archer (born 1987)

Medal record

Women's archery

Representing Canada

World Cup Final
Silver medal – second place	2010 Edinburgh	Individual

Canada Winter Games
Silver medal – second place	2007 Whitehorse	Individual

Ashley Wallace (born 10 September 1987), is a Canadian athlete who competes in compound archery. She has represented the Canadian national team since 2005. She won a silver medal at the World Cup, and became the world number one ranked archer in August 2010.
