= Erika Jones =

American archer (born 1988)

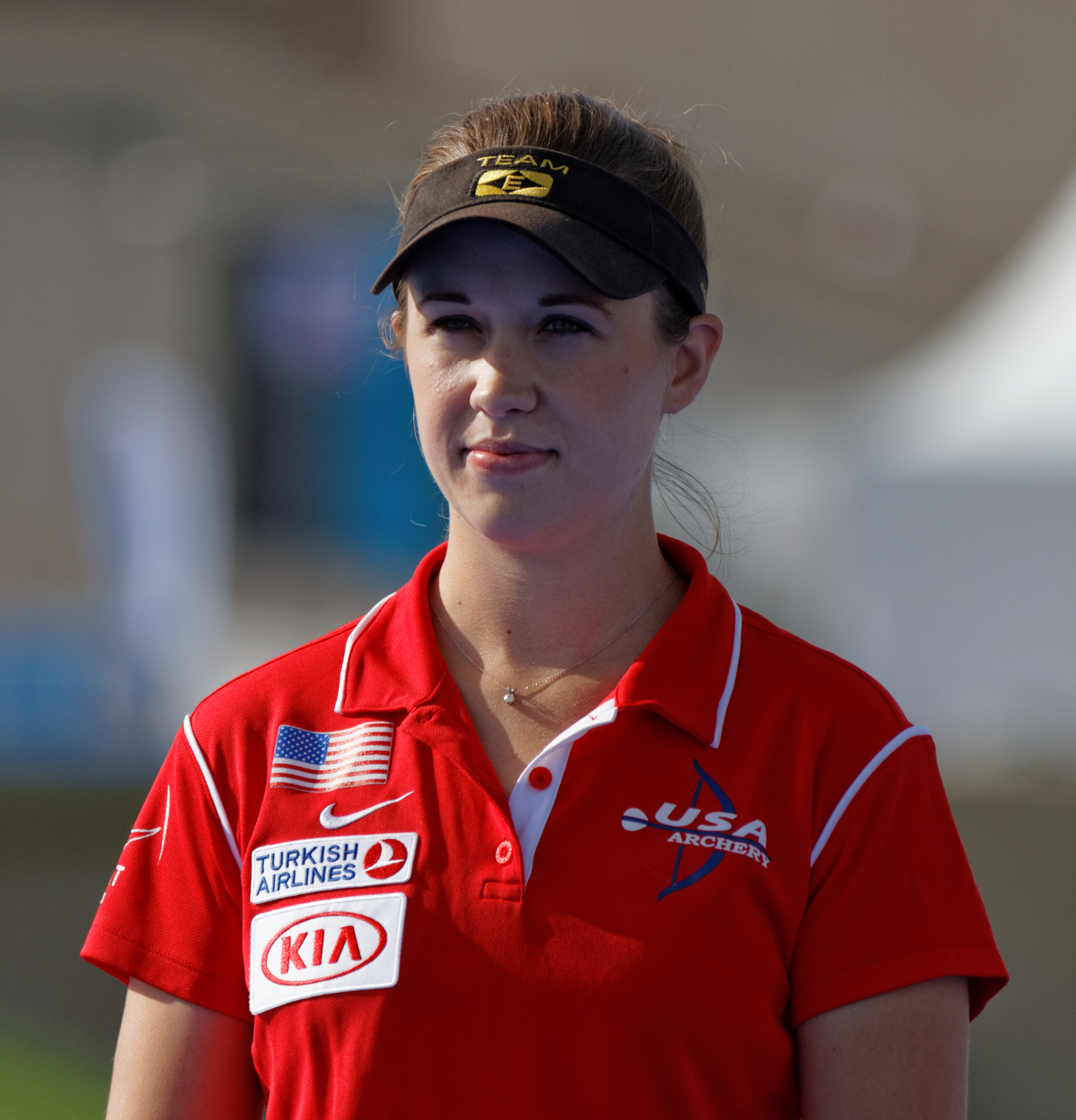

Personal information
- Born: Erika Jones; December 23, 1988 (age 37) Oklahoma, United States
Medal record
Women's compound archery
Representing United States
World Championships
Gold medal – first place	2011 Turin	Team
Silver medal – second place	2005 Madrid	Team
Bronze medal – third place	2011 Turin	Individual
Bronze medal – third place	2009 Ulsan	Team
Bronze medal – third place	2007 Leipzig	Team
Bronze medal – third place	2013 Belek	Mixed team
Universiade
Silver medal – second place	2009 Belgrade	Mixed team
Bronze medal – third place	2009 Belgrade	Individual
World Cup Final
Gold medal – first place	2011 Istanbul	Individual
Gold medal – first place	2014 Lausanne	Mixed team
Silver medal – second place	2013 Paris	Individual
Silver medal – second place	2014 Lausanne	Individual
Bronze medal – third place	2010 Edinburgh	Individual
World Indoor Championships
Gold medal – first place	2012 Las Vegas	Team
Gold medal – first place	2009 Rzeszów	Team
Gold medal – first place	2005 Aalborg	Team Junior
Gold medal – first place	2003 Nimes	Team Junior
Silver medal – second place	2005 Aalborg	Individual Junior
Silver medal – second place	2014 Nîmes	Team
Bronze medal – third place	2009 Rzeszów	Individual
World Games
Gold medal – first place	2013 Cali	Individual
Gold medal – first place	2013 Cali	Mixed Team

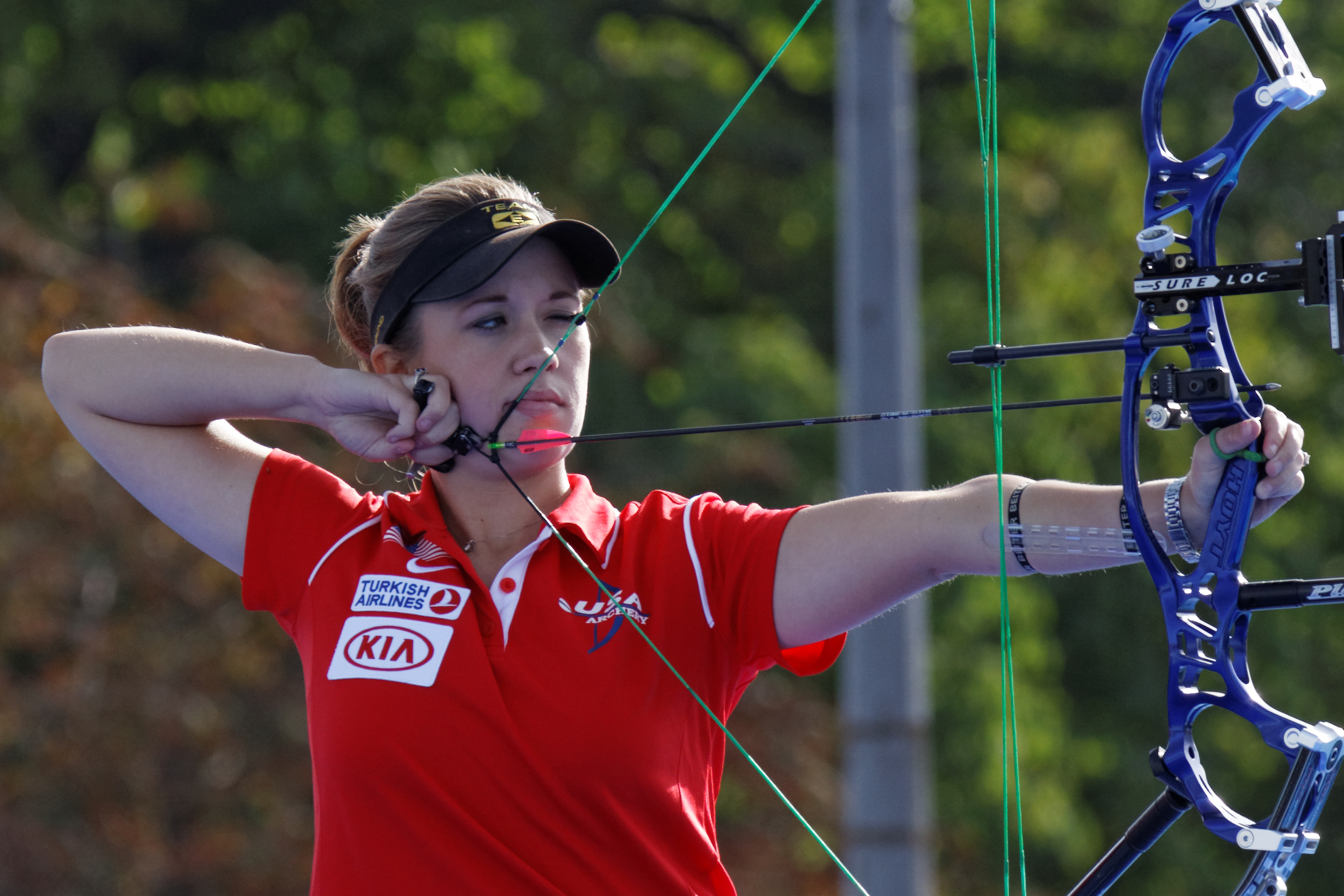
Erika Jones during the FITA Archery World Cup 2013

Erika Jones (born Erika Rae Anschutz; December 23, 1988) is an American archer. She has won gold medals at both major World Archery Federation compound discipline competitions, the World Archery Championships and Archery World Cup, as well as numerous other national, regional and international competitions, including a World Championships cadet title at age 13. She turned professional in 2006 and is a former world number one archer. Jones graduated from the University of Nebraska–Lincoln in 2010. Erika Jones holds the current indoor world record of the World Archery 18m round for Compound Women, at 595 points, shot in Nîmes, France on February 26, 2014.
