= Reo Wilde =

American archer (born 1973)

Medal record

Men's compound archery

Representing United States

World Championships
| Gold medal – first place | 2009 Ulsan | Team |
| Gold medal – first place | 2009 Ulsan | Individual |
| Gold medal – first place | 2011 Turin | Team |
| Bronze medal – third place | 2011 Turin | Individual |

Indoor World Championships
| Gold medal – first place | 2012 Las Vegas | Team |
| Gold medal – first place | 2012 Las Vegas | Individual |
| Gold medal – first place | 2014 Nîmes | Team |
| Silver medal – second place | 2014 Nîmes | Individual |

World Cup
| Gold medal – first place | 2006 Mérida | Individual |
| Silver medal – second place | 2011 Istanbul | Individual |
| Silver medal – second place | 2012 Tokyo | Individual |
| Bronze medal – third place | 2014 Lausanne | Individual |

World Games
| Gold medal – first place | 2013 Cali | Individual |
| Gold medal – first place | 2013 Cali | Mixed Team |

Pan American Championships
| Silver medal – second place | 2018 Medellín | Team |

Reo Wilde (born October 6, 1973, in Pocatello, Idaho) is an American compound archer.

== Career ==
He took up archery in 1992 and first represented the United States senior team in 1995, and has since won many World Cup and World Championships titles. As at October 2013 he is the number two ranked compound archer in the world.
