= Jamie Van Natta =

American archer (born 1978)

- Born: March 31, 1978 (age 48); Pontiac, Michigan, United States
- Education: University of Toledo
- Occupation: Archer

Jamie Van Natta (born March 31, 1978) is an American compound archer. The highest ranking she has reached in women's compound archery is the first position, which she reached for the last time in May 2009.

Van Natta is a resident of Toledo, Ohio and have degrees in computer science engineering with a minor in philosophy from the University of Toledo. During the World Cup in Antalya, Turkey she went scuba diving and prior to winning two gold medals at the World Archery Championships in Berlin, Germany she took a tour of the city. When she was in Varese, Italy with Petra Ericsson, she had an honor to meet a parachutist who almost landed on them while they were finishing the match. She also participated in the Archery World Cup, the final round of which was in Dubai.

On November 15, 2008, Jamie Van Natta married Edmund Burgess in a small but beautiful and romantic ceremony in their hometown of Toledo, Ohio (USA).

== Palmares ==
1997
(silver) World Outdoor Championships, women's team, Victoria
(bronze) World Outdoor Championships, individual, Victoria
2005
(silver) World Games, individual, Duisburg
(gold) World Indoor Championships, women's team, Aalborg
(bronze) World Indoor Championships, individual, Aalborg
(silver) World Outdoor Championships, women's team, Madrid
9th, World Outdoor Championships, individual, Madrid
2006
(silver) World Cup, individual, Poreč
(bronze) World Cup, women's team, Poreč
(silver) World Cup, individual, San Salvador
(bronze) World Cup, women's team, San Salvador
(silver) World Cup, women's team, Shanghai
(bronze) World Field Championships, individual, Gothenburg
2007
(gold) World Indoor Championships, women's team, İzmir
19th, World Indoor Championships, individual, İzmir
(silver) World Cup, women's team, Ulsan
(silver) Arizona Cup, individual, Phoenix
(silver) World Cup, individual, Varese
(bronze) World Cup, women's team, Varese
(gold) World Cup, women's team, Antalya
(bronze) World Outdoor Championships, women's team, Leipzig
13th, World Outdoor Championships, individual, Leipzig
(gold) World Cup, individual, Dover
(bronze) World Cup, individual, Dubai
2008
(gold) World Cup, individual, Santo Domingo
(silver) Arizona Cup, individual, Phoenix
(silver) World Cup, individual, Antalya
(bronze) World Cup, individual, Boé
(gold) World Cup Final, individual, Lausanne
2009
(gold) World Cup, women's team, Santo Domingo
(silver) World Cup, individual, Santo Domingo
(silver) Arizona Cup, individual, Phoenix
2010
(gold) Arizona Cup, individual, Phoenix
(gold) Arizona Cup, women's team, Phoenix
(gold) Arizona Cup, mixed team, Phoenix
(silver) World Cup, women's team, Poreč
(bronze) World Cup, mixed team, Poreč
(gold) World Cup, women's team, Ogden
(silver) World Cup, mixed team, Ogden
(bronze) World Cup, individual, Ogden
(gold) World Cup, women's team, Shanghai
7th, World Cup Final, individual, Edinburgh
2011
(gold) Arizona Cup, women's team, Phoenix
(silver) Arizona Cup, individual, Phoenix
(silver) Arizona Cup, individual, Phoenix
(gold) World Cup, women's team, Antalya
(gold) World Outdoor Championships, women's team, Turin
9th, World Outdoor Championships, individual, Turin
9th, World Outdoor Championships, mixed team, Turin
(gold) World Cup, women's team, Ogden
(gold) World Cup, individual, Shanghai
(gold) World Cup, women's team, Shanghai
(bronze) World Cup, mixed team, Shanghai
2012
(gold) Arizona Cup, individual, Phoenix
(gold) Arizona Cup, women's team, Phoenix
(gold) Arizona Cup, mixed team, Phoenix
(gold) World Cup, women's team, Shanghai
(silver) World Cup, mixed team, Shanghai
(gold) World Cup, women's team, Antalya
2018
(bronze) Pan American Championships, Team, Medellín
