= Anastasia Anastasio =

Italian archer (born 1990)

Personal information
- Nationality: Italian
- Citizenship: Italian
- Born: 15 July 1990 (age 35) Tarquinia, Italy
- Occupation: Archer

Sport
- Sport: Archery
- Event: Compound
- Club: Gruppo Sportivo della Marina Militare
Medal record
Universiade
| Bronze medal – third place | 2011 Shenzhen | Mixed team compound |

Anastasia Anastasio (born 15 July 1990) is an Italian compound archer.

== Biography ==
She is the current World Archery number thirteen in women's compound archery. The highest ranking she has reached is the sixth position, which she reached for the last time in May 2010.

== Achievements ==
2005
(bronze) Junior Outdoor European Championships, women's team, Silkeborg
(silver) Junior Field European Championships, women's team, Rogla
(bronze) Junior Field European Championships, individual, Rogla
2006
(gold) 3rd Cadet World Championships, individual, Mérida
(bronze) Junior Field World Championships, individual, Gothenburg
2007
(gold) Junior Indoor World Championships, individual, İzmir
(silver) World Outdoor Championships, women's team, Leipzig
33rd, World Outdoor Championships, individual, Leipzig
2008
4th, Youth World Championships, women's team, Antalya
13th, Youth World Championships, individual, Antalya
2009
(silver) World Cup, individual, Shanghai
9th, World Outdoor Championships, women's team, Ulsan
17th, World Outdoor Championships, individual, Ulsan

2010
(silver) European Outdoor Championships, women's team, Rovereto
9th, European Outdoor Championships, mixed team, Rovereto
17th, European Outdoor Championships, individual, Rovereto
2011
(bronze) Summer Universiade, mixed team, Shenzhen
5th, Summer Universiade, women's team, Shenzhen
17th, Summer Universiade, individual, Shenzhen
2012
(bronze) World Cup, women's team, Shanghai
(silver) World Cup, women's team, Antalya
(silver) European Outdoor Championships, individual, Amsterdam
(silver) European Outdoor Championships, women's team, Amsterdam
