= Nicky Hunt (archer) =

British archer (born 1985)

Medal record

Women's archery

Representing England

Commonwealth Games
Gold medal – first place	2010 Delhi	Compound individual
Gold medal – first place	2010 Delhi	Compound team

Nicola Jane "Nicky" Hunt (born 29 January 1985 in Stevenage) is a British archer. She competes in compound archery and in 2010 reached 1st position in the FITA world rankings. In partnership with Nichola Simpson and Danielle Brown she helped the English team win the women's compound team event at the 2010 Commonwealth Games in Delhi then added the individual gold medal a day later. She has won rounds of the FITA Archery World Cup in 2009 (Poreč) and 2010 (Shanghai). Hunt is a member of Deben Archery Club.
