= Christie Colin =

American compound archer

- Born: June 14, 1982 (age 43); Portland, Maine, United States
- Occupation: Archer

Christie Colin (maiden name Bisco; born June 14, 1982) is an American compound archer. She is the current World Archery number eight in women's compound archery. The highest ranking she has reached is the eighth position, which she reached for the last time in June 2012.

== Achievements ==
2003
15th, World Outdoor Championships, individual, New York City
2005
(silver) World Outdoor Championships, women's team, Madrid
55th, World Outdoor Championships, individual, Madrid
2006
(bronze) World Cup, women's team, San Salvador
(silver) World Cup, women's team, Shanghai
2007
(gold) World Indoor Championships, women's team, İzmir
9th, World Indoor Championships, individual, İzmir
2011
(gold) Arizona Cup, individual, Phoenix
(gold) Arizona Cup, women's team, Phoenix
(gold) World Cup, mixed team, Poreč
(gold) World Cup, women's team, Antalya
(gold) World Cup, mixed team, Antalya

2011 (continued)
(gold) World Outdoor Championships, women's team, Turin
9th, World Outdoor Championships, individual, Turin
(gold) World Cup, women's team, Ogden
(gold) World Cup, mixed team, Ogden
(gold) World Cup, women's team, Shanghai
(silver) World Cup Final, individual, Istanbul

2012
(gold) World Indoor Championships, women's team, Las Vegas
4th, World Indoor Championships, individual, Las Vegas
9th, Indoor World Cup Final, individual, Las Vegas
(gold) Arizona Cup, women's team, Phoenix
(gold) World Cup, women's team, Shanghai
(gold) World Cup, women's team, Antalya

2017
(bronze) The World Games 2017, Wrocław, Poland
