= Jorge Jiménez (archer) =

Salvadoran archer (born 1967)

Medal record

Men's archery

Representing El Salvador

World Championships
Bronze medal – third place	2009 Ulsan	Team

World Cup
Gold medal – first place	2007 Dubai	Individual
Bronze medal – third place	2006 Merida	Individual

Central American and Caribbean Games
Gold medal – first place	2010 Mayaguez	Team
Silver medal – second place	2010 Mayaguez	Mixed team
Silver medal – second place	2010 Mayaguez	Individual
Bronze medal – third place	2006 Cartagena	Individual

Jorge Jiménez (born 30 September 1967 in San Salvador), is an athlete from El Salvador who competes in compound archery. He won the Archery World Cup in 2007, and achieved number one ranking status in the same year.

In 2013, he represented El Salvador at the 2013 World Games in Cali, Colombia.
