= Diane Watson (archer) =

American archer (born 1964)

- Born: January 21, 1964 (age 62); United States
- Occupation: Archer

Diane Watson (born January 21, 1964) is an American compound archer. She is the current World Archery number nine in women's compound archery. The highest ranking she has reached is the eighth position, which she reached for the last time in May 2012.

== Achievements ==
2009
(gold) World Cup, women's team, Santo Domingo
(bronze) World Outdoor Championships, women's team, Ulsan
25th, World Outdoor Championships, individual, Ulsan
2010
(gold) Arizona Cup, women's team, Phoenix, Arizona
(silver) World Cup, women's team, Poreč
(gold) World Cup, women's team, Ogden
(gold) World Cup, women's team, Shanghai

2011
(gold) Copa Merengue, women's team, Santo Domingo
(silver) Copa Merengue, individual, Santo Domingo
(gold) World Cup, women's team, Shanghai
2012
(gold) Arizona Cup, women's team, Phoenix, Arizona
(bronze) World Cup, individual, Shanghai
