= Linda Ochoa-Anderson =

Mexican archer (born 1987)

Linda Ochoa
- Born: 2 January 1987 (age 39); Guadalajara, Mexico
- Occupation: Archer

Linda "Titi" Ochoa (born January 2, 1987) is a Mexican compound archer. She is the current World Archery number twenty-two in women's compound archery. The highest ranking she has reached is the sixth position, which she reached for the last time in April 2011.

Ochoa has announced that she will give up competing for Mexico, citing "deception and blackmail" by other archers. As of January 2019, she has retired from competition, complaining about a lack of funding.

== Achievements ==
2003
55th, World Outdoor Championships, individual, New York City
2004
(silver) Grand Prix Mexicano, individual, Mexico City
2005
17th, World Outdoor Championships, individual, Madrid
2006
(bronze) World Cup, women's team, Antalya
(gold) World Cup, women's team, San Salvador
(gold) Central American and Caribbean Games, individual, Cartagena
(silver) World Cup, individual, Shanghai
2007
30th, World Outdoor Championships, individual, Leipzig
(gold) World Ranking Tournament, individual, Medellín
2008
(gold) Grand Prix Mexicano, individual, Mérida, Yucatán
(bronze) World Cup, women's team, Santo Domingo
(gold) Pan American Championships, individual, Valencia, Carabobo
2009
(silver) World Cup, women's team, Santo Domingo
6th, Summer Universiade, women's team, Belgrade
10th, Summer Universiade, individual, Belgrade
(silver) World Cup, women's team, Shanghai
4th, World Outdoor Championships, women's team, Ulsan
24th, World Outdoor Championships, individual, Ulsan

2010
(silver) Arizona Cup, women's team, Phoenix
(bronze) World Cup, women's team, Poreč
(gold) World Cup, mixed team, Antalya
(silver) Central American and Caribbean Games, individual, Mayagüez
(silver) Central American and Caribbean Games, women's team, Mayagüez
(bronze) Central American and Caribbean Games, mixed team, Mayagüez
(gold) World Cup, mixed team, Shanghai
(silver) World Cup, individual, Shanghai
6th, World Cup Final, individual, Edinburgh
(gold) Pan American Championships, women's team, Guadalajara
(gold) Pan American Championships, mixed team, Guadalajara
(bronze) Pan American Championships, individual, Guadalajara
2011
(silver) Arizona Cup, women's team, Phoenix
4th, World Outdoor Championships, women's team, Turin
6th, World Outdoor Championships, mixed team, Turin
17th, World Outdoor Championships, individual, Turin
4th, Summer Universiade, women's team, Shenzhen
6th, Summer Universiade, mixed team, Shenzhen
9th, Summer Universiade, individual, Shenzhen
(gold) World Cup, mixed team, Shanghai
2012
(bronze) World Indoor Championships, individual, Las Vegas
6th, World Indoor Championships, women's team, Las Vegas
(silver) Arizona Cup, mixed team, Phoenix
(bronze) Arizona Cup, women's team, Phoenix
(gold) Pan American Championships, women's team, San Salvador
(gold) Pan American Championships, mixed team, San Salvador
5th, Pan American Championships, individual, San Salvador
