= 2003 World Archery Championships – Women's team compound =

The women's team compound competition at the 2003 World Archery Championships took place in July 2003 in New York City, United States. 69 archers took part in the women's compound qualification round with no more than 4 from each country. As there were only 15 eligible teams of 3 archers, all teams qualified for the 4-round knockout round, drawn according to their qualification round scores, with the top-ranked team given a bye to the quarter-final.

== Seeds ==
Seedings were based on the combined total of the team members' qualification scores in the individual ranking rounds. The top 16 teams were assigned places in the draw depending on their overall ranking.

1. (United States) Mary Zorn / Amber Dawson / Aya Labrie (champions)
2. (France) Sandrine Vandionant / Cecile Jousselin / Valerie Fabre (2nd place)
3. (Netherlands) Irma Luyting / Olga Zandvliet / Marijn Schoormans (quarterfinal)
4. (Finland) Anne Laurila / Sirkka Sokka-Matikainen / Anna-Lisa Tuuttu (1st round)
5. (Russia) Sofia Goncharova / Anna Kazantseva / Svetlana Kondrashenko (quarterfinal)
6. (Germany) Petra Dortmund / Andrea Weihe / Dorith Landesfeind (3rd place)
7. (Australia) Madeleine Ferris / Kellie Weston / Erika Anear (quarterfinal)
8. (Sweden) Ulrika Sjöwall / Caroline Patic / Sara Boberg (1st round)
9. (Mexico) Almendra Ochoa / Carmen Santacruz / Linda Ochoa (quarterfinal)
10. (Canada) Dawn Groszko / Lilian Meehan / Lynne Durward (1st round)
11. (Denmark) Louise Hauge / Camilla Sømod / Merete Nielsen (1st round)
12. (Italy) Antonella Doni / Giorgia Solato / Eugenia Salvi (1st round)
13. (Norway) June Svensen / Ann Renee Hegge / Dagrun Haukdal (4th place)
14. (Brazil) Dirma dos Santos / Jacqueline Hirschbruch / Talita Rodrigues (1st round)
15. (Guatemala) Marcela Prado / Beatriz Marinelli / Carolina Chacon (1st round)

== Draw ==
1st round
1	United States
Bye
9	Mexico	252
8	Sweden	248
5	Russia	254
12	Italy	245
13	Norway	247
4	Finland	246
3	Netherlands	247
14	Brazil	218
11	Denmark	243
6	Germany	257
7	Australia	246
10	Canada	233
15	Guatemala	227
2	France	249

Quarterfinals
1	United States	255
9	Mexico	245
5	Russia	238
13	Norway	238*
3	Netherlands	244
6	Germany	254
7	Australia	248
2	France	251

Semifinals
1	United States	257
13	Norway	233
6	Germany	246
2	France	250

Finals
1	United States	248
2	France	239
Third place
13	Norway	235
6	Germany	241
