= 2005 World Archery Championships – Women's team compound =

The women's team compound competition at the 2005 World Archery Championships took place in June 2005 in Madrid, Spain. 87 archers took part in the women's compound qualification round with no more than 4 from each country, and the 16 teams of 3 archers with the highest cumulative totals (out of a possible 20) qualified for the 4-round knockout round, drawn according to their qualification round scores.

== Seeds ==
Seedings were based on the combined total of the team members' qualification scores in the individual ranking rounds. The top 16 teams were assigned places in the draw depending on their overall ranking.

1. (Russia) Anna Kazantseva / Oktyabrina Bolotova / Sofia Goncharova (quarterfinal)
2. (United States) Mary Zorn / Erika Anschutz / Jamie van Natta (2nd place)
3. (Mexico) Arminda Bastos / Carmen Santacruz / Linda Ochoa (quarterfinal)
4. (France) Anne-Marie Bloch / Valerie Fabre / Cecile Jousselin (champions)
5. (Philippines) Maria Amaya Amparo Paz / Jennifer Dy Chan / Joann Tabanag (1st round)
6. (Spain) Fatima Agudo / Teresa Ronco / Julia Benito (1st round)
7. (India) Jhano Hansdah / Bansaralin Dhar / Sakro Besra (1st round)
8. (Denmark) Camilla Sømod / Louise Hauge / Rikke Marslev (3rd place)
9. (Italy) Giorgia Solato / Eugenia Salvi / Biagia Sambataro (1st round)
10. (Germany) Petra Dortmund / Christina Knoebel / Dorith Landesfeind (quarterfinal)
11. (Belgium) Gladys Willems / Yolande Anris / Kathy Deacon (4th place)
12. (Sweden) Ingrid Olofsson / Caroline Patic / Ulrika Sjöwall (quarterfinal)
13. (United Kingdom) Emma Parker / Katy Moir / Nichola Simpson (1st round)
14. (Australia) Erika Anear / Kellie Weston / Marie Hulbert (1st round)
15. (Netherlands) Irina Markovic / Olga Zandvliet / Geertje Hottentot (1st round)
16. (Finland) Anna-Lisa Tuuttu / Anne Laurila / Sirkka Sokka-Matikainen (1st round)

== Draw ==
1st round
1	Russia	253
16	Finland	235
9	Italy	249
8	Denmark	251
5	Philippines	238
12	Sweden	239
13	United Kingdom	243
4	France	251
3	Mexico	251
14	Australia	232
11	Belgium	249
6	Spain	235
7	India	238
10	Germany	246
15	Netherlands	241
2	United States	247

Quarterfinals
1	Russia	244
8	Denmark	248
12	Sweden	235
4	France	249
3	Mexico	237
11	Belgium	248
10	Germany	239
2	United States	255

Semifinals
8	Denmark	239
4	France	252
11	Belgium	235
2	United States	253

Finals
4	France	250
2	United States	246
Third place
8	Denmark	242
11	Belgium	238
