= Archery at the 2006 Asian Games – Women's individual =

Women's individual recurve at the 2006 Asian Games
- Venue: Lusail Archery Range
- Dates: 9–11 December 2006
- Competitors: 60 from 17 nations

Medalists
gold medal	Park Sung-hyun	South Korea
silver medal	Yun Ok-hee	South Korea
bronze medal	Zhao Ling	China

The women's individual recurve competition at the 2006 Asian Games in Doha, Qatar was held from 9 to 11 December at the Lusail Archery Range.

== Schedule ==
All times are Arabia Standard Time (UTC+03:00)

Date	Time	Event
Saturday, 9 December 2006	09:00	Qualification 90/70 m
Sunday, 10 December 2006	09:00	Qualification 50/30 m
Monday, 11 December 2006	09:45	1/16 round
Monday, 11 December 2006	10:30	1/8 round
Monday, 11 December 2006	11:15	Quarterfinals
Monday, 11 December 2006	13:00	Semifinals
Monday, 11 December 2006	14:20	Bronze medal match
Monday, 11 December 2006	14:50	Final

== Results ==
=== Qualification ===
Rank	Seed	Athlete	Distance				Total	10s	Xs
Rank	Seed	Athlete	70m	60m	50m	30m	Total	10s	Xs
1	1	Park Sung-hyun (KOR)	325	328	332	354	1339	72	29
2	2	Yun Ok-hee (KOR)	319	326	336	354	1335	70	35
3	—	Lee Tuk-young (KOR)	316	329	327	351	1323	59	24
4	—	Yun Mi-jin (KOR)	320	325	317	351	1313	58	27
5	3	Kim Yong-ok (PRK)	314	327	319	343	1303	53	11
6	4	Zhao Ling (CHN)	305	328	323	341	1297	55	19
7	5	Zhang Juanjuan (CHN)	313	328	312	344	1297	50	18
8	6	Kwon Un-sil (PRK)	312	321	316	347	1296	49	16
9	—	Qian Jialing (CHN)	308	321	321	345	1295	52	19
10	7	Yuan Shu-chi (TPE)	307	326	313	348	1294	53	19
11	—	Son Hye-yong (PRK)	315	317	315	346	1293	45	15
12	8	Reena Kumari (IND)	305	314	328	344	1291	55	16
13	—	Yu Hui (CHN)	302	322	321	346	1291	52	20
14	9	Novia Nuraini (INA)	313	310	317	349	1289	50	18
15	10	Mayumi Asano (JPN)	315	319	314	341	1289	47	16
16	11	Dola Banerjee (IND)	308	307	321	350	1286	49	14
17	12	Wu Hui-ju (TPE)	309	314	317	346	1286	49	13
18	13	Rina Dewi Puspitasari (INA)	312	322	302	346	1282	45	11
19	14	Yelena Plotnikova (KAZ)	290	311	318	345	1264	43	14
20	15	Rachel Cabral (PHI)	301	311	314	337	1263	40	12
21	16	Sayoko Kitabatake (JPN)	300	308	306	342	1256	38	12
22	—	Lin Hua-shan (TPE)	294	311	310	337	1252	35	12
23	—	Gina Rahayu Sugiharti (INA)	284	314	314	339	1251	44	17
24	—	Lai Yi-hsin (TPE)	297	307	317	327	1248	40	9
25	—	Chekrovolu Swuro (IND)	278	312	308	338	1236	34	6
26	17	Viktoriya Beloslyudtseva (KAZ)	276	302	310	347	1235	40	12
27	18	Dorji Dolma (BHU)	294	320	291	330	1235	24	9
28	19	Siti Sholeha Yusof (MAS)	280	313	301	340	1234	36	21
29	20	Katherine Santos (PHI)	291	299	300	341	1231	37	16
30	—	Yukari Segawa (JPN)	288	294	311	337	1230	37	11
31	—	Punya Prabha (IND)	291	300	311	327	1229	38	15
32	—	Jasmin Figueroa (PHI)	276	305	306	342	1229	32	13
33	21	Dorji Dema (BHU)	286	302	308	333	1229	26	8
34	22	Anbarasi Subramaniam (MAS)	291	295	297	344	1227	31	10
35	—	Tshering Choden (BHU)	273	310	294	343	1220	42	9
36	—	Yasmidar Hamid (INA)	280	292	291	342	1205	31	12
37	—	Noor Aziera Taip (MAS)	283	294	287	331	1195	30	3
38	—	Anastassiya Bannova (KAZ)	282	285	293	327	1187	32	9
39	—	Ainur Abdraimova (KAZ)	270	295	301	315	1181	26	10
40	—	Mon Redee Sut Txi (MAS)	264	288	290	338	1180	29	10
41	23	Roza Nazirova (UZB)	275	292	281	321	1169	24	3
42	—	Kanako Baba (JPN)	262	305	265	330	1162	29	8
43	—	Karen Grace Yasi (PHI)	251	280	289	339	1159	29	8
44	24	Fotima Tagoeva (TJK)	260	290	278	331	1159	28	0
45	25	Munira Nurmanova (UZB)	271	273	292	321	1157	28	5
46	26	Bishindeegiin Urantungalag (MGL)	254	291	275	325	1145	22	3
47	27	Jamyansürengiin Udval (MGL)	241	274	289	333	1137	29	6
48	28	Narisara Tinbua (THA)	244	290	261	333	1128	28	7
49	29	Dilhara Salgado (SRI)	242	258	288	338	1126	24	11
50	—	Tamiriin Amarjargal (MGL)	254	282	274	297	1107	23	2
51	—	Surayo Vakilova (UZB)	232	296	269	309	1106	13	0
52	30	Firuza Zubaydova (TJK)	240	281	245	309	1075	14	4
53	31	Dudulie Yasodhara Silva (SRI)	239	264	249	316	1068	13	5
54	—	Tenzin Lhamo (BHU)	218	261	262	325	1066	21	6
55	—	Zuhro Tagoeva (TJK)	256	255	246	301	1058	15	2
56	—	Sajeevi Silva (SRI)	237	264	240	294	1035	15	3
57	—	Amalia Usmanova (UZB)	211	248	251	309	1019	13	1
58	32	Nada Hassan (QAT)	232	249	235	269	985	8	5
59	33	Najoa Al-Kuwari (QAT)	208	221	212	265	906	9	3
60	—	Sara Al-Ali (QAT)	83	146	127	216	572	5	0

=== Knockout round ===
==== Finals ====
Final
1	Park Sung-hyun (KOR)	95
2	Yun Ok-hee (KOR)	91

Bronze medal match
4	Zhao Ling (CHN)	83
11	Dola Banerjee (IND)	77

==== Top half ====
1/16 round
1	Park Sung-hyun (KOR)	111
32	Nada Hassan (QAT)	75
17	Viktoriya Beloslyudtseva (KAZ)	104
16	Sayoko Kitabatake (JPN)	110
9	Novia Nuraini (INA)	101
24	Fotima Tagoeva (TJK)	86
25	Munira Nurmanova (UZB)	83
8	Reena Kumari (IND)	100
5	Zhang Juanjuan (CHN)	105
28	Narisara Tinbua (THA)	94
21	Dorji Dema (BHU)	95
12	Wu Hui-ju (TPE)	103
13	Rina Dewi Puspitasari (INA)	103
20	Katherine Santos (PHI)	101
29	Dilhara Salgado (SRI)	91
4	Zhao Ling (CHN)	101

1/8 round
1	Park Sung-hyun (KOR)	109
16	Sayoko Kitabatake (JPN)	106
9	Novia Nuraini (INA)	108
8	Reena Kumari (IND)	98
5	Zhang Juanjuan (CHN)	109
12	Wu Hui-ju (TPE)	101
13	Rina Dewi Puspitasari (INA)	100
4	Zhao Ling (CHN)	102

Quarterfinals
1	Park Sung-hyun (KOR)	104
9	Novia Nuraini (INA)	93
5	Zhang Juanjuan (CHN)	103
4	Zhao Ling (CHN)	104

Semifinals
1	Park Sung-hyun (KOR)	97
4	Zhao Ling (CHN)	90

==== Bottom half ====
1/16 round
3	Kim Yong-ok (PRK)	102
30	Firuza Zubaydova (TJK)	86
19	Siti Sholeha Yusof (MAS)	98
14	Yelena Plotnikova (KAZ)	99
11	Dola Banerjee (IND)	112
22	Anbarasi Subramaniam (MAS)	104
27	Jamyansürengiin Udval (MGL)	84
6	Kwon Un-sil (PRK)	110
7	Yuan Shu-chi (TPE)	103
26	Bishindeegiin Urantungalag (MGL)	107
23	Roza Nazirova (UZB)	97
10	Mayumi Asano (JPN)	108
15	Rachel Cabral (PHI)	105
18	Dorji Dema (BHU)	100
31	Dudulie Yasodhara Silva (SRI)	85
2	Yun Ok-hee (KOR)	111

1/8 round
3	Kim Yong-ok (PRK)	101
14	Yelena Plotnikova (KAZ)	109
11	Dola Banerjee (IND)	111
6	Kwon Un-sil (PRK)	103
26	Bishindeegiin Urantungalag (MGL)	102
10	Mayumi Asano (JPN)	99
15	Rachel Cabral (PHI)	98
2	Yun Ok-hee (KOR)	111

Quarterfinals
14	Yelena Plotnikova (KAZ)	99
11	Dola Banerjee (IND)	109
26	Bishindeegiin Urantungalag (MGL)	95
2	Yun Ok-hee (KOR)	105

Semifinals
11	Dola Banerjee (IND)	103
2	Yun Ok-hee (KOR)	106
