= Archery at the 2006 Asian Games – Women's team =

Women's team recurve at the 2006 Asian Games
- Venue: Lusail Archery Range
- Dates: 9–13 December 2006
- Competitors: 59 from 16 nations

Medalists
gold medal	South Korea; Lee Tuk-young, Park Sung-hyun, Yun Mi-jin, Yun Ok-hee
silver medal	China; Qian Jialing, Yu Hui, Zhang Juanjuan, Zhao Ling
bronze medal	Chinese Taipei; Lai Yi-hsin, Lin Hua-shan, Wu Hui-ju, Yuan Shu-chi

The women's team recurve competition at the 2006 Asian Games in Doha, Qatar was held from 9 to 13 December at the Lusail Archery Range.

== Schedule ==
All times are Arabia Standard Time (UTC+03:00)

Date	Time	Event
Saturday, 9 December 2006	09:00	Qualification 90/70 m
Sunday, 10 December 2006	09:00	Qualification 50/30 m
Wednesday, 13 December 2006	07:45	1/8 round
Wednesday, 13 December 2006	08:20	Quarterfinals
Wednesday, 13 December 2006	09:00	Semifinals
Wednesday, 13 December 2006	10:05	Bronze medal match
Wednesday, 13 December 2006	10:40	Final

== Results ==
=== Qualification ===
Rank	Team	Distance				Total	10s	Xs
Rank	Team	70m	60m	50m	30m	Total	10s	Xs
1	South Korea (KOR)	960	983	995	1059	3997	201	88
	Lee Tuk-young	316	329	327	351	1323	59	24
	Park Sung-hyun	325	328	332	354	1339	72	29
	Yun Mi-jin	~~320~~	~~325~~	~~317~~	~~351~~	~~1313~~	~~58~~	~~27~~
	Yun Ok-hee	319	326	336	354	1335	70	35
2	North Korea (PRK)	941	965	950	1036	3892	147	42
	Kim Yong-ok	314	327	319	343	1303	53	11
	Kwon Un-sil	312	321	316	347	1296	49	16
	Son Hye-yong	315	317	315	346	1293	45	15
3	China (CHN)	926	977	956	1030	3889	157	56
	Qian Jialing	308	321	321	345	1295	52	19
	Yu Hui	~~302~~	~~322~~	~~321~~	~~346~~	~~1291~~	~~52~~	~~20~~
	Zhao Ling	305	328	323	341	1297	55	19
	Zhang Juanjuan	313	328	312	344	1297	50	18
4	Chinese Taipei (TPE)	910	951	940	1031	3832	137	44
	Lai Yi-hsin	~~297~~	~~307~~	~~317~~	~~327~~	~~1248~~	~~40~~	~~9~~
	Lin Hua-shan	294	311	310	337	1252	35	12
	Yuan Shu-chi	307	326	313	348	1294	53	19
	Wu Hui-ju	309	314	317	346	1286	49	13
5	Indonesia (INA)	909	946	933	1034	3822	139	46
	Yasmidar Hamid	~~280~~	~~292~~	~~291~~	~~342~~	~~1205~~	~~31~~	~~12~~
	Novia Nuraini	313	310	317	349	1289	50	18
	Gina Rahayu Sugiharti	284	314	314	339	1251	44	17
	Rina Dewi Puspitasari	312	322	302	346	1282	45	11
6	India (IND)	891	933	957	1032	3813	138	36
	Dola Banerjee	308	307	321	350	1286	49	14
	Reena Kumari	305	314	328	344	1291	55	16
	Punya Prabha	~~291~~	~~300~~	~~311~~	~~327~~	~~1229~~	~~38~~	~~15~~
	Chekrovolu Swuro	278	312	308	338	1236	34	6
7	Japan (JPN)	903	921	931	1020	3775	122	39
	Mayumi Asano	315	319	314	341	1289	47	16
	Kanako Baba	~~262~~	~~305~~	~~265~~	~~330~~	~~1162~~	~~29~~	~~8~~
	Sayoko Kitabatake	300	308	306	342	1256	38	12
	Yukari Segawa	288	294	311	337	1230	37	11
8	Philippines (PHI)	868	915	920	1020	3723	109	41
	Rachel Cabral	301	311	314	337	1263	40	12
	Jasmin Figueroa	276	305	306	342	1229	32	13
	Katherine Santos	291	299	300	341	1231	37	16
	Karen Grace Yasi	~~251~~	~~280~~	~~289~~	~~339~~	~~1159~~	~~29~~	~~8~~
9	Kazakhstan (KAZ)	848	898	921	1019	3686	115	35
	Ainur Abdraimova	~~270~~	~~295~~	~~301~~	~~315~~	~~1181~~	~~26~~	~~10~~
	Anastassiya Bannova	282	285	293	327	1187	32	9
	Viktoriya Beloslyudtseva	276	302	310	347	1235	40	12
	Yelena Plotnikova	290	311	318	345	1264	43	14
10	Bhutan (BHU)	853	932	893	1006	3684	92	26
	Tshering Choden	273	310	294	343	1220	42	9
	Dorji Dema	286	302	308	333	1229	26	8
	Dorji Dolma	294	320	291	330	1235	24	9
	Tenzin Lhamo	~~218~~	~~261~~	~~262~~	~~325~~	~~1066~~	~~21~~	~~6~~
11	Malaysia (MAS)	854	902	885	1015	3656	97	34
	Mon Redee Sut Txi	~~264~~	~~288~~	~~290~~	~~338~~	~~1180~~	~~29~~	~~10~~
	Anbarasi Subramaniam	291	295	297	344	1227	31	10
	Noor Aziera Taip	283	294	287	331	1195	30	3
	Siti Sholeha Yusof	280	313	301	340	1234	36	21
12	Uzbekistan (UZB)	778	861	842	951	3432	65	8
	Roza Nazirova	275	292	281	321	1169	24	3
	Munira Nurmanova	271	273	292	321	1157	28	5
	Amalia Usmanova	~~211~~	~~248~~	~~251~~	~~309~~	~~1019~~	~~13~~	~~1~~
	Surayo Vakilova	232	296	269	309	1106	13	0
13	Mongolia (MGL)	749	847	838	955	3389	74	11
	Tamiriin Amarjargal	254	282	274	297	1107	23	2
	Jamyansürengiin Udval	241	274	289	333	1137	29	6
	Bishindeegiin Urantungalag	254	291	275	325	1145	22	3
14	Tajikistan (TJK)	756	826	769	941	3292	57	6
	Fotima Tagoeva	260	290	278	331	1159	28	0
	Zuhro Tagoeva	256	255	246	301	1058	15	2
	Firuza Zubaydova	240	281	245	309	1075	14	4
15	Sri Lanka (SRI)	718	786	777	948	3229	52	19
	Dilhara Salgado	242	258	288	338	1126	24	11
	Dudulie Yasodhara Silva	239	264	249	316	1068	13	5
	Sajeevi Silva	237	264	240	294	1035	15	3
16	Qatar (QAT)	523	616	574	750	2463	22	8
	Sara Al-Ali	83	146	127	216	572	5	0
	Najoa Al-Kuwari	208	221	212	265	906	9	3
	Nada Hassan	232	249	235	269	985	8	5

=== Knockout round ===
1/8 round
1	South Korea	210
16	Qatar	136
9	Kazakhstan	197
8	Philippines	185
5	Indonesia	195
12	Uzbekistan	161
13	Mongolia	166
4	Chinese Taipei	202
3	China	200
14	Tajikistan	159
11	Malaysia	166
6	India	197
7	Japan	207
10	Bhutan	191
15	Sri Lanka	171
2	North Korea	203

Quarterfinals
1	South Korea	213
9	Kazakhstan	194
5	Indonesia	187
4	Chinese Taipei	207
3	China	201
6	India	199
7	Japan	201
2	North Korea	208

Semifinals
1	South Korea	211
4	Chinese Taipei	196
3	China	201
2	North Korea	190

Final
1	South Korea	215
3	China	209
Bronze medal match
4	Chinese Taipei	208
2	North Korea	206
