= 2003 World Archery Championships – Women's individual compound =

The women's individual compound competition at the 2003 World Archery Championships took place in July 2003 in New York City, United States. 69 archers entered the competition. Following a qualifying 144 arrow FITA round, the top 64 archers qualified for the 6-round knockout tournament, drawn according to their qualification round scores. The semi-finals and finals then took place on 20 July.

== Qualifying ==
The following archers were the leading 8 qualifiers:

1. (United States) Mary Zorn (Champion)
2. (United States) Amber Dawson (2nd place)
3. (Netherlands) Irma Luyting (3rd place)
4. (France) Sandrine Vandionant (4th place)
5. (Russia) Sofia Goncharova (3rd round)
6. (Australia) Madeleine Ferris (3rd round)
7. (Belgium) Gladys Willems (1st round)
8. (France) Cecile Jousselin (2nd round)

== Finals ==
Quarterfinals
1	(United States) Mary Zorn	110
9	(Finland) Anne Laurila	105
12	(United States) Erika Aya Labrie	108
4	(France) Sandrine Vandionant	109
3	(Netherlands) Irma Luyting	111
11	(Germany) Petra Dortmund	105
26	(France) Maggy Masson	107
2	(United States) Amber Dawson	111

Semifinals
1	(United States) Mary Zorn	108
4	(France) Sandrine Vandionant	107
3	(Netherlands) Irma Luyting	110
2	(United States) Amber Dawson	114

Finals
1	(United States) Mary Zorn	115
2	(United States) Amber Dawson	113
Third place
4	(France) Sandrine Vandionant	112
3	(Netherlands) Irma Luyting	114
