= 2001 World Archery Championships – Women's individual compound =

The women's individual compound competition at the 2001 World Archery Championships took place in September 2001 in Beijing, China. 57 archers entered the competition. Following a qualifying 144 arrow FITA round, the archers were drawn for the 6-round knockout tournament according to their qualification round scores, with the top 7 archers receiving byes to the second round. The semi-finals and finals then took place on 23 September.

== Qualifying ==
The following archers were the leading 8 qualifiers:

1. (Canada) Dawn Groszko (2nd round)
2. (France) Catherine Pellen (2nd round)
3. (France) Maggy Masson (3rd round)
4. (France) Valerie Fabre (3rd round)
5. (Australia) Madeleine Ferris (3rd round)
6. (Netherlands) Irma Luyting (Quarterfinal)
7. (Turkey) Huriye Eksi-Kahraman (Quarterfinal)
8. (Croatia) Andrea Cizmek (2nd round)

== Finals ==
Quarterfinals
17	(Finland) Sirkka Sokka-Matikainen	111
24	(Austria) Petra Friedl	108
21	(Germany) Bettina Thiele	113
13	(Belgium) Gladys Willems	111
14	(Spain) Fatima Agudo	110
6	(Netherlands) Irma Luyting	102
7	(Turkey) Huriye Eksi-Kahraman	106
15	(Sweden) Ulrika Sjöwall	108

Semifinals
17	(Finland) Sirkka Sokka-Matikainen	109
21	(Germany) Bettina Thiele	112
14	(Spain) Fatima Agudo	106
15	(Sweden) Ulrika Sjöwall	109

Finals
21	(Germany) Bettina Thiele	111
15	(Sweden) Ulrika Sjöwall	113
Third place
17	(Finland) Sirkka Sokka-Matikainen	110
14	(Spain) Fatima Agudo	108
