= 2001 World Archery Championships – Women's team compound =

The women's team compound competition at the 2001 World Archery Championships took place in September 2001 in Beijing, China. 57 archers took part in the women's compound qualification round with no more than 4 from each country. All 10 eligible teams of 3 archers qualified for the 4-round knockout round, and were drawn according to their qualification round scores, with the highest 6 qualifiers getting a bye to the quarter-finals.

== Seeds ==
Seedings were based on the combined total of the team members' qualification scores in the individual ranking rounds. The 10 teams were assigned places in the draw depending on their overall ranking.

1. (France) Maggy Masson / Catherine Pellen / Valerie Fabre (champions)
2. (Netherlands) Irma Luyting / Marjon Digney / Olga Zandvliet (3rd place)
3. (Italy) Stefania Montagnoni / Assunta Atorino / Francesca Peracino (2nd place)
4. (Germany) Bettina Thiele / Christina Knoebel / Dorith Landesfeind (4th place)
5. (Canada) Dawn Groszko / Lillian Meehan / Lynne Durward (quarterfinal)
6. (Russia) Sofia Goncharova / Nadejda Pavlova / Kira Andreeva (quarterfinal)
7. (Turkey) Huriye Eksi-Kahraman / Sevinc Kuzu / Tuba Soyer (quarterfinal)
8. (Australia) Madeleine Ferris / Marie Hulbert / Sue Martin (1st round)
9. (United Kingdom) Claire Trenaman / Linda Garner / Katy Moir (quarterfinal)
10. (South Africa) Eleanor Smit / Aurelie Medalie / Noneen Knox (1st round)

== Draw ==
1st round
1	France
Bye
9	United Kingdom	237
8	Australia	230
5	Canada
Bye
4	Germany
Bye
3	Italy
Bye
6	Russia
Bye
7	Turkey	243
10	South Africa	215
2	Netherlands
Bye

Quarterfinals
1	France	259
9	United Kingdom	248
5	Canada	233
4	Germany	248
3	Italy	245
6	Russia	243
7	Turkey	242
2	Netherlands	248

Semifinals
1	France	246
4	Germany	243
3	Italy	245
2	Netherlands	237

Finals
1	France	238
3	Italy	236
Third place
4	Germany	240
2	Netherlands	254
