= 2005 World Archery Championships – Women's individual recurve =

The women's individual recurve competition at the 2005 World Archery Championships took place in June 2005 in Madrid, Spain. 109 archers entered the competition. Following a qualifying 144 arrow FITA round on 22 June, the top 64 archers qualified for the 6-round knockout tournament, drawn according to their qualification round scores. The semi-finals and finals then took place on 27 June.

== Qualifying ==
The following archers were the leading 8 qualifiers:

1. (South Korea) Park Sung-hyun (3rd place)
2. (South Korea) Lee Tuk-young (2nd place)
3. (South Korea) Yun Mi-jin (3rd round)
4. (United States) Jennifer Nichols (Quarterfinal)
5. (Ukraine) Tetyana Berezhna (1st round)
6. (Italy) Natalia Valeeva (4th place)
7. (Japan) Mayumi Asano (Quarterfinal)
8. (Russia) Margarita Galinovskaya (Quarterfinal)

== Full draw ==
=== Section 1 ===
1st round
1	(South Korea) Park Sung-hyun	169
64	(Slovenia) Dolores Cekada	146
33	(Italy) Pia Carmen Lionetti	153
32	(Spain) Almudena Gallardo	148
17	(Poland) Justyna Mospinek	149
48	(Belarus) Hanna Karasiova	158
49	(Russia) Ekaterina Kharkhanova	153
16	(Georgia (country)) Kristina Esebua	151
9	(India) Dola Banerjee	156*
56	(Turkey) Natalia Nasaridze	156
41	(India) Chekrovolu Swuro	158
24	(Germany) Veronika Haidn Tschalova	160
25	(Germany) Christina Schaefer	146
40	(United Kingdom) Charlotte Burgess	147
57	(Malaysia) Mon Redee Sut Txi	147
8	(Russia) Margarita Galinovskaya	152

2nd round
1	(South Korea) Park Sung-hyun	170
33	(Italy) Pia Carmen Lionetti	154
48	(Belarus) Hanna Karasiova	149
49	(Russia) Ekaterina Kharkhanova	142
9	(India) Dola Banerjee	161
24	(Germany) Veronika Haidn Tschalova	157
40	(United Kingdom) Charlotte Burgess	153
8	(Russia) Margarita Galinovskaya	157

3rd round
1	(South Korea) Park Sung-hyun	165
48	(Belarus) Hanna Karasiova	157
9	(India) Dola Banerjee	147
8	(Russia) Margarita Galinovskaya	149

Quarterfinal
1	(South Korea) Park Sung-hyun	113
8	(Russia) Margarita Galinovskaya	102

=== Section 2 ===
1st round
5	(Ukraine) Tetyana Berezhna	151
60	(Malaysia) Anbarasi Subramaniam	152
37	(Turkey) Derya Sarialtin	153
28	(Italy) Elena Tonetta	153*
21	(Ukraine) Kateryna Palekha	147
44	(Sweden) Karin Larsson	157
53	(Sweden) Anna Alnefelt	140
12	(South Korea) Lee Sung-jin	164
13	(Ukraine) Nataliya Burdeyna	159
52	(Japan) Yuki Hayashi	155
45	(Georgia (country)) Khatuna Narimanidze	157*
20	(China) He Ying	157
29	(China) Qian Jialing	147
36	(Belarus) Katsiaryna Milanovich	145
61	(Chinese Taipei) Wu Hui-ju	153
4	(United States) Jennifer Nichols	156

2nd round
60	(Malaysia) Anbarasi Subramaniam	152
28	(Italy) Elena Tonetta	153
44	(Sweden) Karin Larsson	153
12	(South Korea) Lee Sung-jin	160
13	(Ukraine) Nataliya Burdeyna	159
45	(Georgia (country)) Khatuna Narimanidze	154
29	(China) Qian Jialing	155
4	(United States) Jennifer Nichols	158

3rd round
28	(Italy) Elena Tonetta	153
12	(South Korea) Lee Sung-jin	159
13	(Ukraine) Nataliya Burdeyna	143
4	(United States) Jennifer Nichols	154

Quarterfinal
12	(South Korea) Lee Sung-jin	112
4	(United States) Jennifer Nichols	106

=== Section 3 ===
1st round
3	(South Korea) Yun Mi-jin	165
62	(Poland) Izabella Niemiec	149
35	(Japan) Sayoko Kawauchi	153
30	(United Kingdom) Naomi Folkard	153*
19	(Chinese Taipei) Yuan Shu-chi	162
46	(Poland) Wioleta Myszor	158
51	(Indonesia) Rina Dewi Puspitasari	151
14	(China) Guo Dan	162
11	(India) Reena Kumari	167
54	(Spain) Beatriz Gómez	145
43	(Finland) Marjo Vikstrom	155
22	(Netherlands) Femke Boonen	155*
27	(Ukraine) Kateryna Ksenofontova	150
38	(Germany) Anja Hitzler	139
59	(United Kingdom) Lana Needham	142
6	(Italy) Natalia Valeeva	164

2nd round
3	(South Korea) Yun Mi-jin	152
30	(United Kingdom) Naomi Folkard	149
19	(Chinese Taipei) Yuan Shu-chi	155*
14	(China) Guo Dan	155
11	(India) Reena Kumari	146
22	(Netherlands) Femke Boonen	154
27	(Ukraine) Kateryna Ksenofontova	155
6	(Italy) Natalia Valeeva	159

3rd round
3	(South Korea) Yun Mi-jin	156
19	(Chinese Taipei) Yuan Shu-chi	158
22	(Netherlands) Femke Boonen	149
6	(Italy) Natalia Valeeva	158

Quarterfinal
19	(Chinese Taipei) Yuan Shu-chi	107
6	(Italy) Natalia Valeeva	108

=== Section 4 ===
1st round
7	(Japan) Mayumi Asano	154
58	(Turkey) Damla Günay	148
39	(Japan) Ayu Oikawa	130
26	(Chinese Taipei) Tseng Li-wan	142
23	(Russia) Elena Gracheva	161
42	(Greece) Anita-Avi Atlas	149
55	(Georgia (country)) Asmat Diasamidze	149
10	(China) Xu Linlin	161
15	(United States) Khatuna Lorig	159
50	(India) Ranu	155
47	(Germany) Karina Winter	154
18	(United Kingdom) Alison Williamson	153
31	(Belarus) Katsiarina Muliuk	154
34	(Turkey) Zekiye Satir	142
63	(Mexico) Marisol Bretón	151
2	(South Korea) Lee Tuk-young	159

2nd round
7	(Japan) Mayumi Asano	159
26	(Chinese Taipei) Tseng Li-wan	147
23	(Russia) Elena Gracheva	144
10	(China) Xu Linlin	150
15	(United States) Khatuna Lorig	153
47	(Germany) Karina Winter	152
31	(Belarus) Katsiarina Muliuk	152
2	(South Korea) Lee Tuk-young	160

3rd round
7	(Japan) Mayumi Asano	156
10	(China) Xu Linlin	152
15	(United States) Khatuna Lorig	152
2	(South Korea) Lee Tuk-young	160

Quarterfinal
7	(Japan) Mayumi Asano	106
2	(South Korea) Lee Tuk-young	106*

== Finals ==
Quarterfinals
1	(South Korea) Park Sung-hyun	113
8	(Russia) Margarita Galinovskaya	102
12	(South Korea) Lee Sung-jin	112
4	(United States) Jennifer Nichols	106
19	(Chinese Taipei) Yuan Shu-chi	107
6	(Italy) Natalia Valeeva	108
7	(Japan) Mayumi Asano	106
2	(South Korea) Lee Tuk-young	106*

Semifinals
1	(South Korea) Park Sung-hyun	104
12	(South Korea) Lee Sung-jin	107
6	(Italy) Natalia Valeeva	106
2	(South Korea) Lee Tuk-young	109

Finals
12	(South Korea) Lee Sung-jin	111
2	(South Korea) Lee Tuk-young	109
Third place
1	(South Korea) Park Sung-hyun	113
6	(Italy) Natalia Valeeva	104
