= 2005 World Archery Championships – Women's individual compound =

The women's individual compound competition at the 2005 World Archery Championships took place in June 2005 in Madrid, Spain. 87 archers entered the competition. Following a qualifying 144 arrow FITA round on 22 June, the top 64 archers qualified for the 6-round knockout tournament, drawn according to their qualification round scores. The semi-finals and finals then took place on 27 June.

== Qualifying ==
The following archers were the leading 8 qualifiers:

1. (Spain) Fatima Agudo (3rd round)
2. (Russia) Anna Kazantseva (2nd round)
3. (United States) Mary Zorn (3rd round)
4. (United States) Erika Anschutz (1st round)
5. (United States) Jamie van Natta (3rd round)
6. (Mexico) Arminda Bastos (2nd place)
7. (Russia) Oktyabrina Bolotova (2nd round)
8. (Philippines) Amaya Paz (2nd round)

== Finals ==
Quarterfinals
16	(Denmark) Camilla Sømod	106
40	(Russia) Svetlana Kondrashenko	107
12	(Russia) Sofia Goncharova	109
36	(France) Cecile Jousselin	104
14	(Austria) Petra Friedl	103
6	(Mexico) Arminda Bastos	110
23	(Italy) Eugenia Salvi	105
15	(France) Valerie Fabre	106

Semifinals
40	(Russia) Svetlana Kondrashenko	103
12	(Russia) Sofia Goncharova	106
6	(Mexico) Arminda Bastos	109
15	(France) Valerie Fabre	107

Finals
12	(Russia) Sofia Goncharova	112
6	(Mexico) Arminda Bastos	109
Third place
40	(Russia) Svetlana Kondrashenko	113
15	(France) Valerie Fabre	109
