= Archery at the 2006 Asian Games =

- Venue: Lusail Archery Range
- Dates: 9–13 December 2006
- Competitors: 119 from 22 nations

Archery was competed at the 2006 Asian Games in Doha, Qatar. Men and women competed in both individual and team events with all competition taking place at the Lusail Archery Range from December 9 through December 13.

The competition included only recurve events.

== Schedule ==
| R | Ranking round | F | Elimination rounds & Finals |

| Event↓/Date → | 9th Sat | 10th Sun | 11th Mon | 12th Tue | 13th Wed |
|---|---|---|---|---|---|
| Men's individual | R | R | | F | |
| Men's team | R | R | | | F |
| Women's individual | R | R | F | | |
| Women's team | R | R | | | F |

== Medalists ==
| Event | Gold | Silver | Bronze |
|---|---|---|---|
| Men's individual | Im Dong-hyun; South Korea | Tomokazu Wakino; Japan | Kuo Cheng-wei; Chinese Taipei |
| Men's team | South Korea; Im Dong-hyun; Jang Yong-ho; Lee Chang-hwan; Park Kyung-mo | Chinese Taipei; Chen Szu-yuan; Hsu Tzu-yi; Kuo Cheng-wei; Wang Cheng-pang | India; Mangal Singh Champia; Tarundeep Rai; Jayanta Talukdar; Vishwas |
| Women's individual | Park Sung-hyun; South Korea | Yun Ok-hee; South Korea | Zhao Ling; China |
| Women's team | South Korea; Lee Tuk-young; Park Sung-hyun; Yun Mi-jin; Yun Ok-hee | China; Qian Jialing; Yu Hui; Zhang Juanjuan; Zhao Ling | Chinese Taipei; Lai Yi-hsin; Lin Hua-shan; Wu Hui-ju; Yuan Shu-chi |

== Medal table ==
| Rank | Nation | Gold | Silver | Bronze | Total |
|---|---|---|---|---|---|
| 1 | South Korea (KOR) | 4 | 1 | 0 | 5 |
| 2 | Chinese Taipei (TPE) | 0 | 1 | 2 | 3 |
| 3 | China (CHN) | 0 | 1 | 1 | 2 |
| 4 | Japan (JPN) | 0 | 1 | 0 | 1 |
| 5 | India (IND) | 0 | 0 | 1 | 1 |
| Totals (5 entries) | | 4 | 4 | 4 | 12 |

== Participating nations ==
A total of 119 athletes from 22 nations competed in archery at the 2006 Asian Games:

- Bhutan (8)
- China (8)
- Chinese Taipei (8)
- Hong Kong (4)
- India (8)
- Indonesia (5)
- Iraq (1)
- Japan (8)
- Kazakhstan (8)
- Kyrgyzstan (1)
- Lebanon (1)
- Malaysia (8)
- Mongolia (7)
- Myanmar (4)
- North Korea (3)
- Philippines (8)
- Qatar (7)
- South Korea (8)
- Sri Lanka (4)
- Tajikistan (3)
- Thailand (2)
- Uzbekistan (5)
