= 2006 Archery World Cup =

International archery competition

The 2006 Archery World Cup was the first edition of the international archery circuit, designed to highlight archery in some of the world's "most spectacular" locations following the success of the 2003 World Championships in New York City and the 2004 Summer Olympics. The best individual and mixed performers in each discipline over the three legs then joined host representatives in qualifying for the finals.

== Competition rules and scoring ==
The compound legs consisted of a 50m qualification round of 72 arrows, followed by the compound round at 50m on a 6-zone target face, using cumulative scoring for all individual, team and mixed competitions. The top four individual performers (with no more than two from each country) proceeded to the finals.

The recurve legs consisted of a FITA qualification round, followed by a 72m Olympic set system . The top seven individual performers (with no more than two from each country), plus one host nation representative if not already qualified, proceeded to the finals; the top mixed team performer proceeded to face the host nation at the finals, which were the same competition format as the legs. The team competition was not competed at the finals.

Competitors' top three scores go towards qualification. The scores awarded in the legs were as follows:

=== Individual scoring ===
Position	Points
1st place	25
2nd place	21
3rd place	18
4th place	15
5th place	13
6th place	12
7th place	11
8th place	10
9th–16th place	5

== Calendar ==
Stage	Location
1	Poreč, Croatia
2	Antalya Centennial Archery Field, Antalya, Turkey
3	San Salvador, El Salvador
4	Shanghai, China
Final	Mayapán Pyramids, Tecoh, Mexico (Note: The city of Tecoh uses its competition name during the tournament: Mérida.)

== Results ==
=== Recurve ===
==== Men's individual ====
Stage	Date	Location	1st place, gold medalist(s)	2nd place, silver medalist(s)	3rd place, bronze medalist(s)	Ref.
1	13 May	(Croatia) Poreč	(India) Jayanta Talukdar	(Sweden) Magnus Petersson	(Ukraine) Markiyan Ivashko	
2	10 June	(Turkey) Antalya	(South Korea) Park Kyung-mo	(Japan) Hiroshi Yamamoto	(Bulgaria) Yavor Hristov	
3	25 June	(El Salvador) San Salvador	(Italy) Ilario di Buo	(Netherlands) Wietse van Alten	(Netherlands) Pieter Custers	
4	30 September	(China) Shanghai	(South Korea) Jang Yong-ho	(South Korea) Park Kyung-mo	(China) Yong Fujun	
Final	22 October	(Mexico) Mérida	(South Korea) Park Kyung-mo	(Italy) Ilario di Buo	(Sweden) Magnus Petersson	

==== Women's individual ====
Stage	Date	Location	1st place, gold medalist(s)	2nd place, silver medalist(s)	3rd place, bronze medalist(s)	Ref.
1	13 May	(Croatia) Poreč	(Russia) Margarita Galinovskaya	(Italy) Maura Frigeri	(Italy) Pia Carmen Lionetti	
2	10 June	(Turkey) Antalya	(China) Qian Jialing	(South Korea) Kim Yu-mi	(South Korea) Lee Tuk-young	
3	25 June	(El Salvador) San Salvador	(China) Qian Jialing	(United Kingdom) Alison Williamson	(China) Zhang Juanjuan	
4	30 September	(China) Shanghai	(South Korea) Yun Ok-hee	(South Korea) Yun Mi-jin	(South Korea) Lee Tuk-young	
Final	22 October	(Mexico) Mérida	(China) Zhang Juanjuan	(China) Qian Jialing	(Italy) Elena Tonetta	

==== Men's team ====
Stage	Date	Location	1st place, gold medalist(s)	2nd place, silver medalist(s)	3rd place, bronze medalist(s)	Ref.
1	12 May	(Croatia) Poreč	Italy	China	Russia	
2	9 June	(Turkey) Antalya	Japan	United Kingdom	South Korea	
3	24 June	(El Salvador) San Salvador	Italy	Mexico	United Kingdom	
4	30 September	(China) Shanghai	South Korea	Turkey	Italy	

==== Women's team ====
Stage	Date	Location	1st place, gold medalist(s)	2nd place, silver medalist(s)	3rd place, bronze medalist(s)	Ref.
1	12 May	(Croatia) Poreč	United Kingdom	Russia	China	
2	9 June	(Turkey) Antalya	South Korea	China	Ukraine	
3	24 June	(El Salvador) San Salvador	Turkey	Italy	China	
4	30 September	(China) Shanghai	South Korea	China	Turkey	

=== Compound ===
==== Men's individual ====
Stage	Date	Location	1st place, gold medalist(s)	2nd place, silver medalist(s)	3rd place, bronze medalist(s)	Ref.
1	13 May	(Croatia) Poreč	(United States) Reo Wilde	(Netherlands) Emiel Custers	(France) Dominique Genet	
2	10 June	(Turkey) Antalya	(Brazil) Roberval dos Santos	(Netherlands) Peter Elzinga	(Switzerland) Patrizio Hofer	
3	25 June	(El Salvador) San Salvador	(United States) Logan Wilde	(United States) Reo Wilde	(El Salvador) Jorge Jiménez	
4	30 September	(China) Shanghai	(United States) Dave Cousins	(El Salvador) Jorge Jiménez	(Brazil) Vitor Sidi Neto	
Final	22 October	(Mexico) Mérida	(United States) Reo Wilde	(Netherlands) Peter Elzinga	(El Salvador) Jorge Jiménez	

==== Women's individual ====
Stage	Date	Location	1st place, gold medalist(s)	2nd place, silver medalist(s)	3rd place, bronze medalist(s)	Ref.
1	13 May	(Croatia) Poreč	(Russia) Anna Kazantseva	(United States) Jamie van Natta	(United States) Jahna Davis	
2	10 June	(Turkey) Antalya	(Russia) Sofia Goncharova	(Russia) Anna Kazantseva	(United Kingdom) Nichola Simpson	
3	25 June	(El Salvador) San Salvador	(Russia) Sofia Goncharova	(United States) Jamie van Natta	(Mexico) Almendra Ochoa	
4	30 September	(China) Shanghai	(Russia) Sofia Goncharova	(Mexico) Linda Ochoa	(Russia) Anna Kazantseva	
Final	22 October	(Mexico) Mérida	(Russia) Sofia Goncharova	(Russia) Anna Kazantseva	(United States) Jahna Davis	

==== Men's team ====
Stage	Date	Location	1st place, gold medalist(s)	2nd place, silver medalist(s)	3rd place, bronze medalist(s)	Ref.
1	12 May	(Croatia) Poreč	United States	United Kingdom	Netherlands	
2	9 June	(Turkey) Antalya	Denmark	Netherlands	France	
3	24 June	(El Salvador) San Salvador	Netherlands	Brazil	United States	
4	30 September	(China) Shanghai	United States	Mexico	China	

==== Women's team ====
Stage	Date	Location	1st place, gold medalist(s)	2nd place, silver medalist(s)	3rd place, bronze medalist(s)	Ref.
1	12 May	(Croatia) Poreč	France	India	United States	
2	9 June	(Turkey) Antalya	Russia	Croatia	Mexico	
3	24 June	(El Salvador) San Salvador	Mexico	United Kingdom	United States	
4	30 September	(China) Shanghai	Russia	United States	Philippines	

== Medals table ==
Rank	Nation	Gold	Silver	Bronze	Total
1	Russia	8	3	2	13
2	South Korea	7	3	3	13
3	United States	6	4	5	15
4	China	3	4	5	12
5	Italy	3	3	3	9
6	Netherlands	1	5	2	8
7	Great Britain	1	4	2	7
8	Mexico	1	3	2	6
9	Brazil	1	1	1	3
9	Turkey	1	1	1	3
11	India	1	1	0	2
11	Japan	1	1	0	2
13	France	1	0	2	3
14	Denmark	1	0	0	1
15	El Salvador	0	1	2	3
16	Sweden	0	1	1	2
17	Croatia	0	1	0	1
18	Ukraine	0	0	2	2
19	Bulgaria	0	0	1	1
19	Philippines	0	0	1	1
19	Switzerland	0	0	1	1
Totals (21 entries)		36	36	36	108

== Qualification ==
=== Recurve ===
==== Men's individual ====
Pos.	Name	Points	(Croatia)	(Turkey)	(El Salvador)	(China)	
1.	(Italy) Ilario di Buo	53	13	8	25	15	Q
2.	(South Korea) Park Kyung-mo	46	–	25	–	21	Q
3.	(India) Jayanta Talukdar	38	25	13	–	–	Q
4.	(Sweden) Magnus Petersson	37	21	10	–	6	Q
5.	(Italy) Marco Galiazzo	36	5	–	8	13	
6.	(Italy) Michele Frangilli	34	–	15	11	8	
7.	(China) Yong Fujun	29	–	11	–	18	
8.	(Ukraine) Markiyan Ivashko	26	18	8	–	–	
8.	(Mexico) Eduardo Magaña	26	11	–	15	–	
10.	(Netherlands) Wietse van Alten	23	–	2	21	–	

==== Women's individual ====
Pos.	Name	Points	(Croatia)	(Turkey)	(El Salvador)	(China)	
1.	(China) Qian Jialing	62	12	25	25	–	Q
2.	(South Korea) Yun Ok-hee	40	–	15	–	25	^{1}
3.	(South Korea) Lee Tuk-young	36	–	18	–	18	^{1}
4.	(Italy) Elena Tonetta	33	13	7	13	–	Q
5.	(China) Zhang Juanjuan	33	–	8	18	7	Q
6.	(United Kingdom) Alison Williamson	26	–	–	21	5	Q
7.	(Russia) Margarita Galinovskaya	25	25	–	–	–	
8.	(Poland) Justyna Mospinek	24	–	12	–	12	
9.	(Turkey) Zekiye Keskin Satir	23	8	–	15	–	
10.	(South Korea) Yun Mi-jin	21	–	–	–	21	
10.	(Italy) Pia Carmen Lionetti	21	18	3	–	–	
10.	(South Korea) Kim Yu-mi	21	–	21	–	–	
10.	(Italy) Maura Frigeri	21	21	–	–	–	

^{1.} Qualified but withdrew

=== Compound ===
==== Men's individual ====
Pos.	Name	Points	(Croatia)	(Turkey)	(El Salvador)	(China)	
1.	(United States) Reo Wilde	57	25	–	21	11	Q
2.	(El Salvador) Jorge Jiménez	54	–	15	18	21	Q
3.	(United States) Dave Cousins	45	13	–	7	25	Q
4.	(Netherlands) Peter Elzinga	41	5	21	12	8	Q^{1}
4.	(France) Dominique Genet	41	18	8	–	15	^{1}
6.	(Switzerland) Patrizio Hofer	39	8	18	6	13	
7.	(Brazil) Roberval dos Santos	38	–	25	–	13	
8.	(Netherlands) Emiel Custers	36	21	1	11	4	
9.	(Mexico) Ruben Ochoa	32	11	6	15	5	
10.	(Brazil) Vitor Sidi Neto	29	–	11	–	18	

^{1.} World ranking used as tie break

==== Women's individual ====
Pos.	Name	Points	(Croatia)	(Turkey)	(El Salvador)	(China)	
1.	(Russia) Sofia Goncharova	75	–	25	25	25	Q
2.	(Russia) Anna Kazantseva	64	25	21	8	18	Q
3.	(United States) Jamie van Natta	57	21	–	21	15	Q
4.	(United States) Jahna Davis	46	18	–	15	13	Q
5.	(Mexico) Almendra Ochoa	37	15	4	18	–	
6.	(United Kingdom) Nichola Simpson	33	–	18	13	2	
7.	(United States) Christie Colin	32	13	–	13	6	^{1}
8.	(India) Jhano Hansdah	30	10	12	–	8	
9.	(Mexico) Arminda Bastos	29	6	7	10	12	
10.	(Mexico) Linda Ochoa	27	–	–	6	21	

^{1.} Could not qualify as national quota already reached

=== Nations ranking ===
Pos.	Name	Points	(Croatia)	(Turkey)	(El Salvador)	(China)
1.	United States	305	106	7	122	70
2.	Italy	240	98	36	70	36
3.	South Korea	237	–	114	–	123
4.	Russia	210	64	64	33	49
5.	China	208	25	44	63	76
6.	Mexico	189	43	21	80	45
7.	Netherlands	137	26	37	62	12
8.	United Kingdom	132	12	38	75	7
9.	India	115	50	47	–	18
10.	El Salvador	79	–	21	37	21

== World Cup Final ==
=== Recurve ===
==== Men's individual ====
Semifinals
1	(Italy) Ilario di Buo	110
4	(India) Jayanta Talukdar	109
3	(South Korea) Park Kyung-mo	109
2	(Sweden) Magnus Petersson	104

Finals
1	(Italy) Ilario di Buo	105
3	(South Korea) Park Kyung-mo	112
Third place
4	(India) Jayanta Talukdar	107
2	(Sweden) Magnus Petersson	111

==== Women's individual ====
Semifinals
1	(United Kingdom) Alison Williamson	105
4	(China) Zhang Juanjuan	106
3	(Italy) Elena Tonetta	105
2	(China) Qian Jialing	109

Finals
4	(China) Zhang Juanjuan	107
2	(China) Qian Jialing	103
Third place
1	(United Kingdom) Alison Williamson	104^{8}
3	(Italy) Elena Tonetta	104^{9}

=== Compound ===
==== Men's individual ====
Semifinals
1	(El Salvador) Jorge Jiménez	115
4	(United States) Reo Wilde	118
3	(United States) Dave Cousins	110
2	(Netherlands) Peter Elzinga	113

Finals
4	(United States) Reo Wilde	120
2	(Netherlands) Peter Elzinga	115
Third place
1	(El Salvador) Jorge Jiménez	118
3	(United States) Dave Cousins	113

==== Women's individual ====
Semifinals
1	(Russia) Anna Kazantseva	113
4	(United States) Jahna Davis	109
3	(United States) Jamie van Natta	100
2	(Russia) Sofia Goncharova	111

Finals
1	(Russia) Anna Kazantseva	106
2	(Russia) Sofia Goncharova	112
Third place
4	(United States) Jahna Davis	110
3	(United States) Jamie van Natta	109
