= 2007 Archery World Cup =

International archery competition

The 2007 Archery World Cup was the 2nd edition of the international archery circuit, organised by the World Archery Federation. The best individual and mixed performers in each discipline over the three legs then joined host representatives in qualifying for the Finals.

== Competition rules and scoring ==
The compound legs consisted of a 50m qualification round of 72 arrows, followed by the compound round at 50m on a 6-zone target face, using cumulative scoring for all individual, team and mixed competitions. The top four individual performers (with no more than two from each country) proceeded to the finals.

The recurve legs consisted of a FITA qualification round, followed by a 72m Olympic set system . The top seven individual performers (with no more than two from each country), plus one host nation representative if not already qualified, proceeded to the finals; the top mixed team performer proceeded to face the host nation at the finals, which were the same competition format as the legs. The team competition was not competed at the finals.

Competitors' top three scores go towards qualification. The scores awarded in the legs were as follows:

=== Individual scoring ===
Position	Points
1st place	25
2nd place	21
3rd place	18
4th place	15
5th place	13
6th place	12
7th place	11
8th place	10
9th–16th place	5

== Calendar ==
Stage	Location
1	Ulsan, South Korea
2	Varese, Italy
3	Antalya Centennial Archery Field, Antalya, Turkey
4	Dover, United Kingdom
Final	Dubai, United Arab Emirates

== Results ==
=== Recurve ===
==== Men's individual ====
Stage	Date	Location	1st place, gold medalist(s)	2nd place, silver medalist(s)	3rd place, bronze medalist(s)	Ref.
1	6 April	(South Korea) Ulsan	(Chinese Taipei) Wang Cheng-pang	(Chinese Taipei) Kuo Cheng-wei	(Russia) Baljinima Tsyrempilov	
2	5 May	(Italy) Varese	(Italy) Michele Frangilli	(Russia) Baljinima Tsyrempilov	(France) Thomas Aubert	
3	2 June	(Turkey) Antalya	(South Korea) Kim Yeon-chul	(South Korea) Im Ji-wan	(Mexico) Juan René Serrano	
4	5 August	(United Kingdom) Dover	(Russia) Baljinima Tsyrempilov	(United Kingdom) Alan Wills	(United Kingdom) Simon Terry	
Final	24 November	(United Arab Emirates) Dubai	(Russia) Baljinima Tsyrempilov	(Mexico) Juan René Serrano	(United Kingdom) Alan Wills	

==== Women's individual ====
Stage	Date	Location	1st place, gold medalist(s)	2nd place, silver medalist(s)	3rd place, bronze medalist(s)	Ref.
1	6 April	(South Korea) Ulsan	(South Korea) Park Sung-hyun	(South Korea) Choi Eun-young	(South Korea) Yun Ok-hee	
2	5 May	(Italy) Varese	(South Korea) Lee Hye-yeon	(Russia) Natalya Erdyniyeva	(Belarus) Hanna Marusava	
3	2 June	(Turkey) Antalya	(Russia) Natalya Erdyniyeva	(South Korea) Choi Eun-young	(South Korea) Lee Sung-jin	
4	5 August	(United Kingdom) Dover	(India) Dola Banerjee	(China) Zhang Juanjuan	(Poland) Malgorzata Cwienczek	
Final	24 November	(United Arab Emirates) Dubai	(India) Dola Banerjee	(South Korea) Choi Eun-young	(Russia) Natalya Erdyniyeva	

==== Men's team ====
Stage	Date	Location	1st place, gold medalist(s)	2nd place, silver medalist(s)	3rd place, bronze medalist(s)	Ref.
1	5 April	(South Korea) Ulsan	South Korea	Italy	France	
2	5 May	(Italy) Varese	United Kingdom	Australia	United States	
3	1 June	(Turkey) Antalya	Russia	Netherlands	Ukraine	
4	5 August	(United Kingdom) Dover	Italy	Germany	United Kingdom	

==== Women's team ====
Stage	Date	Location	1st place, gold medalist(s)	2nd place, silver medalist(s)	3rd place, bronze medalist(s)	Ref.
1	5 April	(South Korea) Ulsan	South Korea	Poland	United Kingdom	
2	5 May	(Italy) Varese	China	Poland	South Korea	
3	1 June	(Turkey) Antalya	South Korea	Italy	China	
4	5 August	(United Kingdom) Dover	United Kingdom	Italy	India	

=== Compound ===
==== Men's individual ====
Stage	Date	Location	1st place, gold medalist(s)	2nd place, silver medalist(s)	3rd place, bronze medalist(s)	Ref.
1	6 April	(South Korea) Ulsan	(El Salvador) Jorge Jiménez	(Iran) Reza Zamaninejad	(Netherlands) Fred van Zutphen	
2	5 May	(Italy) Varese	(United States) Braden Gellenthien	(El Salvador) Jorge Jiménez	(Brazil) Roberval dos Santos	
3	2 June	(Turkey) Antalya	(France) Sebastien Brasseur	(United States) Braden Gellenthien	(Germany) Thomas Hasenfuss	
4	5 August	(United Kingdom) Dover	(El Salvador) Jorge Jiménez	(France) Sebastien Brasseur	(United States) Braden Gellenthien	
Final	24 November	(United Arab Emirates) Dubai	(El Salvador) Jorge Jiménez	(United States) Braden Gellenthien	(Brazil) Roberval dos Santos	

==== Women's individual ====
Stage	Date	Location	1st place, gold medalist(s)	2nd place, silver medalist(s)	3rd place, bronze medalist(s)	Ref.
1	6 April	(South Korea) Ulsan	(Russia) Anna Kazantseva	(Russia) Sofia Goncharova	(Indonesia) Foury Akadiani Kusumaniah	
2	5 May	(Italy) Varese	(Sweden) Petra Ericsson	(United States) Jamie van Natta	(Belgium) Gladys Willems	
3	2 June	(Turkey) Antalya	(Russia) Anna Kazantseva	(United States) Jahna Davis	(Belgium) Gladys Willems	
4	5 August	(United Kingdom) Dover	(United States) Jamie van Natta	(Sweden) Petra Ericsson	(Russia) Sofia Goncharova	
Final	24 November	(United Arab Emirates) Dubai	(Sweden) Petra Ericsson	(Russia) Sofia Goncharova	(United States) Jamie van Natta	

==== Men's team ====
Stage	Date	Location	1st place, gold medalist(s)	2nd place, silver medalist(s)	3rd place, bronze medalist(s)	Ref.
1	5 April	(South Korea) Ulsan	Iran	United Kingdom	France	
2	5 May	(Italy) Varese	United States	France	Iran	
3	1 June	(Turkey) Antalya	France	Denmark	United Kingdom	
4	5 August	(United Kingdom) Dover	United States	United Kingdom	Switzerland	

==== Women's team ====
Stage	Date	Location	1st place, gold medalist(s)	2nd place, silver medalist(s)	3rd place, bronze medalist(s)	Ref.
1	5 April	(South Korea) Ulsan	Russia	United States	France	
2	5 May	(Italy) Varese	France	Russia	United States	
3	1 June	(Turkey) Antalya	United States	Russia	Italy	
4	5 August	(United Kingdom) Dover	Venezuela	Indonesia	United Kingdom	

== Medals table ==
Rank	Nation	Gold	Silver	Bronze	Total
1	Russia	7	6	3	16
2	South Korea	6	4	3	13
3	United States	5	5	4	14
4	France	3	2	4	9
5	El Salvador	3	1	0	4
6	Great Britain	2	3	6	11
7	Italy	2	3	1	6
8	Sweden	2	1	0	3
9	India	2	0	1	3
10	China	1	1	1	3
10	Iran	1	1	1	3
12	Chinese Taipei	1	1	0	2
13	Venezuela	1	0	0	1
14	Poland	0	2	1	3
15	Germany	0	1	1	2
15	Indonesia	0	1	1	2
15	Mexico	0	1	1	2
15	Netherlands	0	1	1	2
19	Australia	0	1	0	1
19	Denmark	0	1	0	1
21	Belgium	0	0	2	2
21	Brazil	0	0	2	2
23	Belarus	0	0	1	1
23	Switzerland	0	0	1	1
23	Ukraine	0	0	1	1
Totals (25 entries)		36	36	36	108

== Qualification ==
=== Recurve ===
==== Men's individual ====
Pos.	Name	Points	(South Korea)	(Italy)	(Turkey)	(United Kingdom)	
1.	(Russia) Baljinima Tsyrempilov	64	18	21	12	25	Q
2.	(Mexico) Juan René Serrano	33	–	–	18	15	Q
3.	(United Kingdom) Alan Wills	28	7	–	–	21	Q
4.	(Italy) Michele Frangilli	27	–	25	–	2	Q^{1}
4.	(Italy) Mauro Nespoli	27	–	15	–	12	^{1}
6.	(South Korea) Im Dong-hyun	26	15	–	11	–	
7.	(South Korea) Kim Yeon-chul	25	–	–	25	–	
7.	(China) Xue Haifeng	25	10	–	15	–	
7.	(Chinese Taipei) Wang Cheng-pang	25	25	–	–	–	
10.	(Italy) Ilario di Buo	23	13	–	–	10	

^{1.} world ranking used as tie break

==== Women's individual ====
Pos.	Name	Points	(South Korea)	(Italy)	(Turkey)	(United Kingdom)	
1.	(Russia) Natalya Erdyniyeva	52	6	21	25	–	Q
2.	(South Korea) Choi Eun-young	42	21	–	21	–	Q
3.	(China) Zhang Juanjuan	40	11	8	8	21	Q
4.	(India) Dola Banerjee	37	12	–	–	25	Q
5.	(South Korea) Park Sung-hyun	32	25	–	7	–	
6.	(Italy) Natalia Valeeva	30	–	15	15	–	
7.	(Poland) Malgorzata Cwienczek	27	6	3	2	18	
8.	(South Korea) Lee Hye-yeon	25	–	25	–	–	
9.	(South Korea) Lee Tuk-young	20	15	–	5	–	
9.	(India) Chekrovolu Swuro	20	8	–	–	12	

=== Compound ===
==== Men's individual ====
Pos.	Name	Points	(South Korea)	(Italy)	(Turkey)	(United Kingdom)	
1.	(El Salvador) Jorge Jiménez	71	25	21	7	25	Q
2.	(United States) Braden Gellenthien	64	–	25	21	18	Q
3.	(France) Sebastien Brasseur	58	11	12	25	21	Q
4.	(Brazil) Roberval dos Santos	41	–	18	15	8	Q^{1}
4.	(Switzerland) Patrizio Hofer	41	6	15	13	13	^{1}
6.	(United States) Logan Wilde	31	15	3	13	–	
7.	(France) Dominique Genet	24	13	8	3	–	
8.	(Australia) Clint Freeman	21	13	–	–	8	
8.	(Iran) Reza Zamaninejad	21	21	–	–	–	
10.	(Netherlands) Peter Elzinga	19	–	–	7	12	

^{1.} world ranking used as tie break

==== Women's individual ====
Pos.	Name	Points	(South Korea)	(Italy)	(Turkey)	(United Kingdom)	
1.	(United States) Jamie van Natta	59	13	21	6	25	Q
2.	(Sweden) Petra Ericsson	57	–	25	11	21	Q
3.	(Russia) Anna Kazantseva	53	25	3	25	–	Q
4.	(Russia) Sofia Goncharova	52	21	13	13	18	Q
5.	(Belgium) Gladys Willems	44	–	18	18	8	
6.	(Iran) Shabani Akram	43	15	15	13	–	
7.	(United States) Jahna Davis	39	–	5	21	13	
8.	(France) Amandine Bouillot	22	8	6	8	–	
9.	(United Kingdom) Nicky Hunt	20	5	–	–	15	
10.	(Indonesia) Foury Akadiani Kusumaniah	18	18	–	–	–	

=== Nations ranking ===
Pos.	Nation	Points	(South Korea)	(Italy)	(Turkey)	(United Kingdom)
1.	South Korea	448	216	84	148	–
1.	Russia	448	132	112	153	51
3.	United States	443	69	173	105	96
4.	France	418	145	152	100	21
5.	United Kingdom	395	81	52	52	210
6.	Italy	338	59	80	89	110
7.	China	225	44	66	54	61
8.	Poland	149	38	35	10	66
9.	Iran	138	84	31	13	–
10.	Germany	113	–	5	48	60

== World Cup Final ==
=== Recurve ===
==== Men's individual ====
Semifinals
1	(Russia) Baljinima Tsyrempilov	113
4	(Italy) Michele Frangilli	104
3	(United Kingdom) Alan Wills	104
2	(Mexico) Juan René Serrano	108

Finals
1	(Russia) Baljinima Tsyrempilov	112
2	(Mexico) Juan René Serrano	110
Third place
4	(Italy) Michele Frangilli	102
3	(United Kingdom) Alan Wills	103

==== Women's individual ====
Semifinals
1	(Russia) Natalya Erdyniyeva	106
4	(India) Dola Banerjee	108
3	(China) Zhang Juanjuan	105
2	(South Korea) Choi Eun-young	114

Finals
4	(India) Dola Banerjee	110
2	(South Korea) Choi Eun-young	109
Third place
1	(Russia) Natalya Erdyniyeva	106
3	(China) Zhang Juanjuan	103

=== Compound ===
==== Men's individual ====
Semifinals
1	(El Salvador) Jorge Jiménez	115^{30}
4	(Brazil) Roberval dos Santos	115^{29}
3	(France) Sebastien Brasseur	114^{15}
2	(United States) Braden Gellenthien	114^{20}

Finals
1	(El Salvador) Jorge Jiménez	118
2	(United States) Braden Gellenthien	116
Third place
4	(Brazil) Roberval dos Santos	116
3	(France) Sebastien Brasseur	114

==== Women's individual ====
Semifinals
1	(United States) Jamie van Natta	115^{19}
4	(Russia) Sofia Goncharova	115^{20}
3	(Russia) Anna Kazentseva	113^{9}
2	(Sweden) Petra Ericsson	113^{10}

Finals
4	(Russia) Sofia Goncharova	105
2	(Sweden) Petra Ericsson	116
Third place
1	(United States) Jamie van Natta	114
3	(Russia) Anna Kazentseva	106
