= 2001 World Indoor Archery Championships =

2001 World Indoor Target Archery Championships
- Location: Florence, Italy
- Start date: March 19
- End date: March 24

The 2001 World Indoor Target Archery Championships were held in Florence, Italy from 19 to 24 March 2001.

== Medal summary (Men's individual) ==
Event	Gold	Silver	Bronze
Recurve Men's individual	(Italy) Michele Frangilli	(United States) Butch Johnson	(Turkey) Özdemir Akbal
Compound Men's individual	(Sweden) Morgan Lundin	(Italy) Antonio Tosco	(United States) Dave Cousins

== Medal summary (Women's individual) ==
Event	Gold	Silver	Bronze
Recurve Women's individual	(Italy) Natalia Valeeva	(Poland) Agata Bulwa	(Ukraine) Natalia Burdenaya
Compound Women's individual	(United States) Mary Zorn	(Spain) Fatima Agudo	(Croatia) Andrea Cizmek

== Medal summary (Men's team) ==
Event	Gold	Silver	Bronze
Recurve Men's team	United States (USA); Butch Johnson; Joseph McGlyn; Victor Wunderle	Russia (RUS); Balzhinima Tsyrempilov; Guenn Mitrofanov; Alan Balikoev	Italy (ITA); Michele Frangilli; Ilario Di Buò; Mario Casavecchia
Compound Men's team	Italy (ITA); Antonio Tosco; Fabio Zaetta; Mario Ruele	United States (USA); James Butts; Dave Cousins; Gary Studt	Sweden (SWE); Morgan Lundin; Anders Malm; Dan Sodersten

== Medal summary (Women's team) ==
Event	Gold	Silver	Bronze
Recurve Women's team	Russia (RUS); Anna Poutseva; Margarita Galinovskaya; Svetlana Moisseyeva	United States (USA); Kathleen Loesch; Karen Scavotto; Leah Clawson	Ukraine (UKR); Tetiana Berezhna; Natali Burdeynaya; Kateryna Palekha
Compound Women's team	United States (USA); Mary Zorn; Michele Ragsdale; Ashley Kamuf	France (FRA); Valerie Fabre; Catherine Pellen; Catherine Deburck	Netherlands (NED); Irma Luyting; Marjon Pigney; Olga Zandvliet
