= 2001 World Archery Championships – Men's individual compound =

The men's individual compound competition at the 2001 World Archery Championships took place in September 2001 in Beijing, China. 88 archers entered the competition. Following a qualifying 144 arrow FITA round, the top 64 archers qualified for the 6-round knockout tournament, drawn according to their qualification round scores. The semi-finals and finals then took place on 23 September.

== Qualifying ==
The following archers were the leading 8 qualifiers:

1. (Slovenia) Dejan Sitar (Champion)
2. (Australia) Clint Freeman (3rd round)
3. (Austria) Gerhard Kranabeter (3rd round)
4. (Italy) Mario Ruele (Quarterfinal)
5. (France) Stephane Sauvignon (1st round)
6. (Sweden) Morgan Lundin (2nd place)
7. (Germany) Robert Hesse (3rd round)
8. (Denmark) Henning Kornbek (3rd round)

== Finals ==
Quarterfinals
1	(Slovenia) Dejan Sitar	114*
24	(Germany) Rainer Voss	114
28	(Spain) Jose Ignacio Catalan	111
4	(Italy) Mario Ruele	110
14	(United Kingdom) Michael Peart	114
6	(Sweden) Morgan Lundin	115
10	(Italy) Antonio Tosco	111
18	(Norway) Morten Bøe	115

Semifinals
1	(Slovenia) Dejan Sitar	116
28	(Spain) Jose Ignacio Catalan	112
6	(Sweden) Morgan Lundin	118
18	(Norway) Morten Bøe	116

Finals
1	(Slovenia) Dejan Sitar	118*
6	(Sweden) Morgan Lundin	118
Third place
28	(Spain) Jose Ignacio Catalan	115
18	(Norway) Morten Bøe	115*
