= 2005 World Archery Championships – Women's team recurve =

The women's team recurve competition at the 2005 World Archery Championships took place in June 2005 in Madrid, Spain. 109 archers took part in the women's recurve qualification round with no more than 4 from each country, and the 16 teams of 3 archers with the highest cumulative totals (out of a possible 23) qualified for the 4-round knockout round, drawn according to their qualification round scores.

== Seeds ==
Seedings were based on the combined total of the team members' qualification scores in the individual ranking rounds. The top 16 teams were assigned places in the draw depending on their overall ranking.

1. (South Korea) Park Sung-hyun / Lee Tuk-young / Yun Mi-jin (champions)
2. (Ukraine) Tetyana Berezhna / Nataliya Burdeyna / Kateryna Palekha (2nd place)
3. (China) Xu Linlin / Guo Dan / He Ying (quarterfinal)
4. (Italy) Natalia Valeeva / Elena Tonetta / Pia Carmen Lionetti (quarterfinal)
5. (India) Dola Banerjee / Reena Kumari / Chekrovolu Swuro (4th place)
6. (Russia) Margarita Galinovskaya / Elena Gracheva / Ekaterina Kharkhanova (3rd place)
7. (Japan) Mayuni Asano / Sayoko Kawauchi / Ayu Oikawa (quarterfinal)
8. (Germany) Veronika Haidn Tschalova / Christina Schaefer / Anja Hitzler (1st round)
9. (United Kingdom) Alison Williamson / Naomi Folkard / Charlotte Burgess (quarterfinal)
10. (United States) Jennifer Nichols / Khatuna Lorig / Ashley Kamuf (1st round)
11. (Chinese Taipei) Yuan Shu-chi / Tseng Li-wen / Wu Hui-ju (1st round)
12. (Georgia (country)) Kristina Esebua / Khatuna Narimanidze / Asmat Diasamidze (1st round)
13. (Belarus) Katsiaryna Muliuk / Katsiaryna Milanovich / Hanna Karasiova (1st round)
14. (Poland) Justyna Mospinek / Wioleta Myszor / Izabella Niemiec (1st round)
15. (Turkey) Zekiye Satir / Derya Sarialtin / Natalia Nasaridze (1st round)
16. (Spain) Almudena Gallardo / Beatriz Gómez / Mayi Sunsundegui (1st round)

== Draw ==
1st round
1 | South Korea | 251
16 | Spain | 236
9 | United Kingdom | 238
8 | Germany | 219
5 | India | 230
12 | Georgia | 225
13 | Belarus | 224
4 | Italy | 243
6 | China | 243
14 | Poland | 228
11 | Chinese Taipei | 233
6 | Russia | 235
7 | Japan | 238
10 | United States | 231
15 | Turkey | 234
2 | Ukraine | 250

Quarterfinals
1 | South Korea | 247
9 | United Kingdom | 230
5 | India | 233
4 | Italy | 229
3 | China | 237
6 | Russia | 241
7 | Japan | 219
2 | Ukraine | 236

Semifinals
1 | South Korea | 244
5 | India | 233
6 | Russia | 229
2 | Ukraine | 234

Finals
1 | South Korea | 251
2 | Ukraine | 237
Third place
5 | India | 234
6 | Russia | 236
