= 2009 World Indoor Archery Championships =

2009 World Indoor Target Archery Championships
- Location: Rzeszów, Poland
- Start date: April 03
- End date: April 08

The 2009 World Indoor Target Archery Championships were held in Rzeszów, Poland from April 3 to 8, 2009. A total of 37 countries participated.

== Medal table ==
Rank	Nation	Gold	Silver	Bronze	Total
1	United States	9	4	2	15
2	Italy	2	3	4	9
3	Germany	1	1	0	2
3	Poland	1	1	0	2
5	Ukraine	1	0	1	2
6	Belgium	1	0	0	1
6	Bulgaria	1	0	0	1
8	Russia	0	3	1	4
9	Great Britain	0	2	0	2
10	Chinese Taipei	0	1	0	1
10	Sweden	0	1	0	1
12	France	0	0	4	4
13	Spain	0	0	2	2
14	Mexico	0	0	1	1
14	Norway	0	0	1	1
Totals (15 entries)		16	16	16	48

== Medal summary (individual) ==
Event	Gold	Silver	Bronze
Recurve Men's individual	Yavor Hristov (BUL)	Rafał Dobrowolski (POL)	Jean-Charles Valladont (FRA)
Recurve Women's individual	Karina Winter (GER)	Natalia Valeeva (ITA)	Bérengère Schuh (FRA)
Compound Men's individual	Chance Beaubouef (USA)	Jesse Broadwater (USA)	Dominique Genet (FRA)
Compound Women's individual	Mary Zorn (USA)	Holly Larson (USA)	Erika Anschutz (USA)
Junior Recurve Men's individual	Ivan Denis (BEL)	Luca Melotto (ITA)	Vetle Risinggaard (NOR)
Junior Recurve Women's individual	Rosie Purdy (USA)	Anna Bomboeva (RUS)	Gloria Filippi (ITA)
Junior Compound Men's individual	Kristofer Schaff (USA)	Jonathan Friberg (SWE)	Garrett Abernethy (USA)
Junior Compound Women's individual	Rosie Purdy (USA)	Kendal Nicely (USA)	Clara Nieto Taladriz (ESP)

== Medal summary (team) ==
Event	Gold	Silver	Bronze
Recurve Men's team	United States (USA); Brady Ellison; Staten Holmes; Victor Wunderle	Italy (ITA); Michele Frangilli; Mauro Nespoli; Amedeo Tonelli	Mexico (MEX); Rodrigo Lastra; Juan René Serrano; Eduardo Vélez
Recurve Women's team	Italy (ITA); Pia Carmen Lionetti; Elena Tonetta; Natalia Valeeva	Germany (GER); Susanne Possner; Elena Richter; Karina Winter	Russia (RUS); Natalya Erdyniyeva; Sanzhi Obodoeva; Ksenia Perova
Compound Men's team	United States (USA); Chance Beaubouef; Jesse Broadwater; Braden Gellenthien	Great Britain (GBR); James Bingham; Duncan Busby; Andrew Rikunenko	France (FRA); Sebastien Brasseur; Pierre Julien Deloche; Dominique Genet
Compound Women's team	United States (USA); Mary Zorn; Holly Larson; Erika Anschutz	Great Britain (GBR); Rikki Bingham; Lucy Holderness; Nicky Hunt	Italy (ITA); Laura Longo; Eugenia Salvi; Giorgia Solato
Junior Recurve Men's team	Ukraine (UKR); Heorhiy Ivanytskyy; Vitaliy Komonyuk; Yevhen Marchenko	Chinese Taipei (TPE); Hao-Wen Kao; Shih-Cheng Peng; Hao-Chun Yu	Italy (ITA); Lorenzo Giori; Luca Melotto; Matteo Paoletta
Junior Recurve Women's team	Poland (POL); Joanna Kaminska; Milena Barakonska; Paula Wychechowska	Russia (RUS); Anna Bomboeva; Alena Dombychina; Tatiana Segina	Ukraine (UKR); Iryna Dubas; Lidiia Sichienkova; Yuliya Zakharchenko
Junior Compound Men's team	Italy (ITA); Luca Di Benedetto; Luca Fanti; Jacopo Polidori	United States (USA); Kristofer Schaff; Garrett Abernethy; Ben Cleland	Spain (ESP); Luis Miguel Aguado; Miguel Angel Álvarez; Francisco Javier Valverde
Junior Compound Women's team	United States (USA); Kendal Nicely; Sarah Lance; Rosie Purdy	Russia (RUS); Svetlana Cherkashneva; Anna Artemova; Ekaterina Korobeynikova	Italy (ITA); Debora Boggiatto; Giulia Cavalleri; Sara Frasson
