= Park Sung-hyun =

Park Sung-hyun (Korean: 박성현; RR: Bak Seonghyeon) may refer to:

- Park Sung-hyun (archer) (Hanja: 朴成賢, born 1983), South Korean archer
- Park Sung-hyun (golfer) (Hanja: 朴城炫, born 1993), South Korean golfer
