= Matikainen =

Matikainen is a Finnish surname. Notable people with the surname include:

- Jarmo Matikainen (born 1960), Finnish footballer
- Pentti Matikainen (1950–2025), Finnish ice hockey coach and manager
- Petri Matikainen (born 1967), Finnish ice hockey player and coach

== See also ==
- Marjo Matikainen-Kallström (born 1965), Finnish cross-country skier and politician
- Sirkka Sokka-Matikainen, Finnish archer
