= 2001 World Archery Championships – Men's team compound =

The men's team compound competition at the 2001 World Archery Championships took place in September 2001 in Beijing, China. 88 archers took part in the men's compound qualification round with no more than 4 from each country, and the 16 teams of 3 archers with the highest cumulative totals (out of a possible 19) qualified for the 4-round knockout round, drawn according to their qualification round scores.

== Seeds ==
Seedings were based on the combined total of the team members' qualification scores in the individual ranking rounds. The top 16 teams were assigned places in the draw depending on their overall ranking.

1. (Denmark) Henning Kornbek / Tom Henriksen / Per Knudsen (quarterfinal)
2. (Germany) Robert Hesse / Stefan Griem / Rainer Voss (2nd place)
3. (France) Stephane Sauvignon / Eric Verrier / Christophe Pichenot (quarterfinal)
4. (United Kingdom) Chris White / Michael Peart / Jonathan Mynott (3rd place)
5. (Sweden) Morgan Lundin / Anders Gronberg / Björn Andersson (quarterfinal)
6. (Australia) Clint Freeman / Adam Richards / Marcus Stephens (4th place)
7. (Italy) Mario Ruele / Antonio Tosco / Michele Palumbo (quarterfinal)
8. (Spain) Antonio Gonzalez / Jose Ignacio Catalan / Luis Miguel de la Torre (1st round)
9. (Norway) Morten Bøe / Sigmund Johansen / Kolbjoern Flaa (champions)
10. (El Salvador) Jorge Jiménez / Renato Lara / Ernesto Diaz-Bazan (1st round)
11. (Canada) Ed Wilson / Richard Demers / Phil Prowse (1st round)
12. (Mexico) Alberto Balcazar Oceguera / Alberto Balcazar Campuzano / Julian Villareal (1st round)
13. (Switzerland) David Lopez / Walter Schmied / Juan Galera (1st round)
14. (Turkey) Dincer Ekiz / Ali Saka / Koraya Afacanoglu (1st round)
15. (Russia) Oleg Poluboyarov / Sergey Klochkov / Badma Batoev (1st round)
16. (Malaysia) Michael Tek Kim Soo / Lee Fook Seng / Lee Wayin (1st round)

== Draw ==
1st round
1	Denmark	258
16	Malaysia	248
9	Norway	255
8	Spain	250
5	Sweden	256
12	Mexico	252
13	Switzerland	250
4	United Kingdom	258
3	France	257
14	Turkey	249
11	Canada	254
6	Australia	255
7	Italy	259
10	El Salvador	257
15	Russia	253
2	Germany	256

Quarterfinals
1	Denmark	253
9	Norway	254
5	Sweden	256
4	United Kingdom	259
3	France	258
6	Australia	262
7	Italy	254
2	Germany	256

Semifinals
9	Norway	257
4	United Kingdom	253
6	Australia	249
2	Germany	257

Finals
9	Norway	253
2	Germany	252
Third place
4	United Kingdom	258*
6	Australia	258
