= Mary Hamm =

Mary Hamm may refer to:

- Mary Hamm (archer) (born 1982), American archer
- Mary Hamm (tennis) (born 1954), American tennis player
