= 2005 World Archery Championships – Men's individual compound =

The men's individual compound competition at the 2005 World Archery Championships took place in June 2005 in Madrid, Spain. 129 archers entered the competition. Following a qualifying 144 arrow FITA round on 22 June, the top 64 archers qualified for the 6-round knockout tournament, drawn according to their qualification round scores. The semi-finals and finals then took place on 27 June.

== Qualifying ==
The following archers were the leading 8 qualifiers:

1. (United States) Dave Cousins (2nd round)
2. (United States) Braden Gellenthien (3rd round)
3. (Norway) Morten Bøe (2nd place)
4. (Netherlands) Peter Elzinga (Quarterfinal)
5. (United Kingdom) Chris White (1st round)
6. (France) Dominique Genet (3rd round)
7. (Canada) Kevin Tataryn (Quarterfinal)
8. (Germany) Stefan Griem (2nd round)

== Finals ==
Quarterfinals
17	(Sweden) Morgan Lundin	115
25	(Germany) Paul Titscher	113
12	(Slovenia) Dejan Sitar	114*
4	(Netherlands) Peter Elzinga	114
3	(Norway) Morten Bøe	118
43	(Israel) Franck Karsenty	111
7	(Canada) Kevin Tataryn	116
50	(Mexico) Armando de la Garza	117

Semifinals
17	(Sweden) Morgan Lundin	112
12	(Slovenia) Dejan Sitar	108
3	(Norway) Morten Bøe	114
50	(Mexico) Armando de la Garza	110

Finals
17	(Sweden) Morgan Lundin	112
3	(Norway) Morten Bøe	109
Third place
12	(Slovenia) Dejan Sitar	117
50	(Mexico) Armando de la Garza	112
