= Lee Sung-jin =

South Korean archer (born 1985)

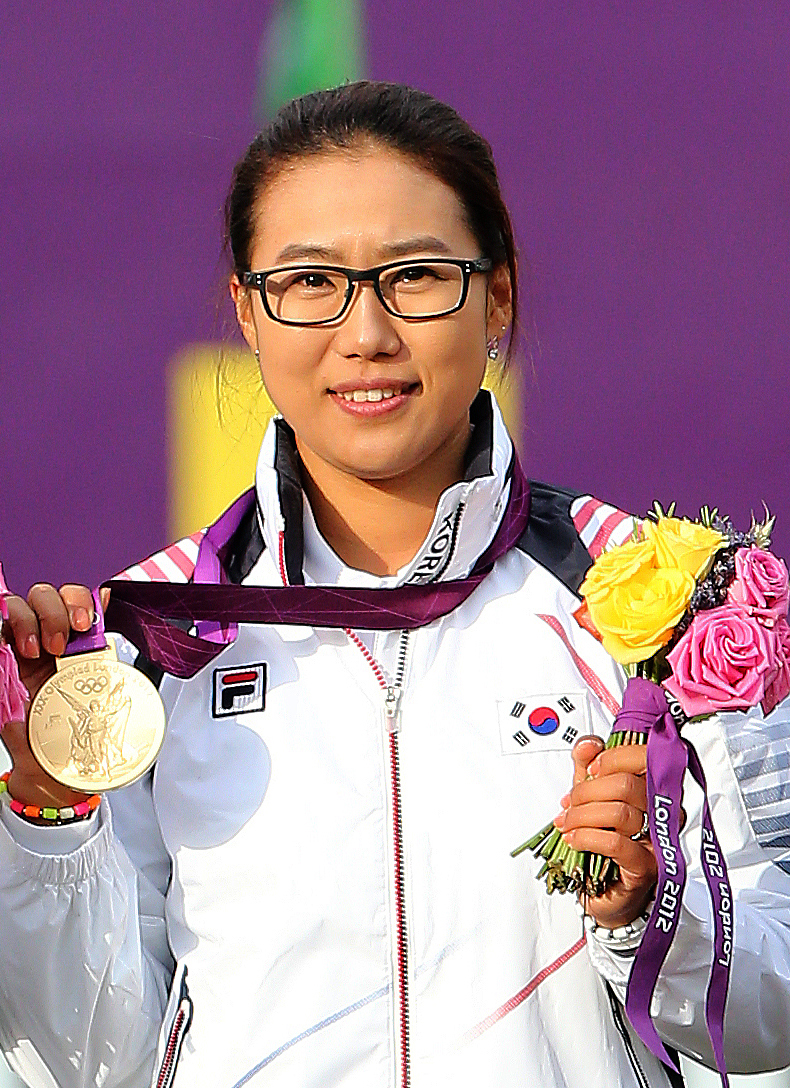

Personal information
- Born: March 7, 1985 (age 41) Chungnam
- Height: 165 cm (5 ft 5 in)
Medal record
Women's recurve archery
Representing South Korea
Olympic Games
Gold medal – first place	2004 Athens	Team
Gold medal – first place	2012 London	Team
Silver medal – second place	2004 Athens	Individual
World Championships
Gold medal – first place	2005 Madrid	Individual
Gold medal – first place	2005 Madrid	Team
Asian Championships
Gold medal – first place	2003 Yangon	Team
Gold medal – first place	2007 Xi'an	Individual
Gold medal – first place	2007 Xi'an	Team
Silver medal – second place	2005 New Delhi	Team
Bronze medal – third place	2003 Yangon	Individual
Universiade
Gold medal – first place	2005 Izmir	Individual
Gold medal – first place	2005 Izmir	Team

Korean name
- Hangul: 이성진
- Hanja: 李成震
- RR: I Seongjin
- MR: I Sŏngjin

Lee Sung-jin (Korean: 이성진; Hanja: 李成震; born March 7, 1985) is a recurve archer from South Korea. She is a two-time Olympic gold medalist, winning in the women's team event at the 2004 and 2012 Summer Olympics. In 2005, she became the women's individual recurve champion at the World Championships and achieved the world number one spot for female recurve archers in the World Archery Rankings. In 2016, the World Archery Federation named her as the ninth best Olympic archer in the history of the Games.

== Career ==
=== Olympic Games ===
==== 2004 Olympics ====
Lee made her Olympic debut aged nineteen at the 2004 Summer Olympics in Athens, joining the defending Olympic champion Yun Mi-jin and the 2001 World Champion Park Sung-hyun on the South Korean women's team. In the preliminary ranking round, which determined the seedings for the elimination rounds of the individual and team events, Lee, Park, and Yun broke the world record for the combined team score over 216 arrows, their total of 2,030 points from a maximum of 2,160 eclipsing the previous best set by the South Korean team at the 2000 Olympics. The score was nevertheless not classified as a new Olympic record because the ranking round took place prior to the opening ceremony. Lee's personal 72-arrow score additionally earned her the second seed for the women's individual event.

In the first round of elimination, she faced 63rd-ranked Lamia Bahnasawy of Egypt. Lee defeated Bahnasawy 164–127 in the 18-arrow match to advance to the round of 32. In that round, she faced 34th-ranked Greek archer Elpida Romantzi, defeating her 166–146. Lee then defeated 15th-ranked Margarita Galinovskaya of Russia 165–163, advancing to the quarterfinals.

In the quarterfinals, Lee faced Wu Hui-ju of Chinese Taipei, narrowly defeating the 10th-ranked archer 104–103 in the 12-arrow match. Lee advanced to the semifinals, where she defeated Yuan Shu-chi, also of Chinese Taipei, 104–98. This moved Lee to the gold medal match, pitting her against fellow Korean Park Sung-hyun. In the final 12-arrow match, Lee lost by two points to the 1st-ranked Park, finishing with a silver medal in women's individual archery while Park won the gold medal.

Lee was also a member of the team that won the gold medal for Korea in the women's team archery competition.

==== 2012 Olympics ====
Lee took part in her second Olympics at the 2012 London Games as part of the South Korean women's archery team alongside Choi Hyeon-ju and Ki Bo-bae. South Korea were the heavy favourites to win the women's team event, and the trio comfortably defeated Denmark, Japan, and China to win South Korea's seventh successive Olympic gold medal in the discipline.

=== World Championships ===
Lee joined Park Sung-hyun and Lee Tuk-young on the women's recurve squad for the 2005 Championships in Madrid, where the South Korean team won gold medal in all four recurve competitions for the first time since 1997. Lee herself won two gold medals, the first coming in the women's team event when she, Park, and Lee Tuk-young defeated Ukraine by a margin of fourteen points. She achieved her second gold medal in the women's individual event, where she advanced to the final after defeating Park in their semi-final encounter, an outcome described by the Korea JoongAng Daily as retribution for the loss Park had inflicted upon her at the 2004 Olympics. Lee defeated Lee Tuk-young in the final by two points, commenting afterwards that the calm weather helped her post a strong points total.
