= 2003 World Indoor Archery Championships =

2003 World Indoor Target Archery Championships
- Location: Nîmes, France
- Start date: March 5
- End date: March 9

The 2003 World Indoor Target Archery Championships were held in Nîmes, France from 5 - 9 March 2003.

== Medal summary (Men's individual) ==
Event	Gold	Silver	Bronze
Recurve Men's individual	(Italy) Ilario Di Buo	(Italy) Michele Frangilli	(Russia) Balzhinima Tsyrempilov
Compound Men's individual	(United States) Reo Wilde	(Sweden) Morgan Lundin	(Switzerland) Patrizio Hofer

== Medal summary (Women's individual) ==
Event	Gold	Silver	Bronze
Recurve Women's individual	(France) Bérengère Schuh	(United States) Jennifer Nichols	(Greece) Evangelia Psarra
Compound Women's individual	(Belgium) Gladys Willems	(United States) Jessica Grant	(United States) Mary Zorn

== Medal summary (Men's team) ==
Event	Gold	Silver	Bronze
Recurve Men's team	Italy (ITA); Marco Galiazzo; Michele Frangilli; Ilario Di Buo	Bulgaria (BUL)	France (FRA)
Compound Men's team	United States (USA); Dave Cousins; Stephen Jervis; Reo Wilde	Sweden (SWE)	Italy (ITA)

== Medal summary (Women's team) ==
Event	Gold	Silver	Bronze
Recurve Women's team	Ukraine (UKR); Yuliya Lobzhenidze; Tetyana Berezhna; Tetyana Dorokhova	Turkey (TUR)	Russia (RUS)
Compound Women's team	United States (USA); Mary Zorn; Michele Ragsdale; Jessica Grant	Belgium (BEL)	Great Britain (GBR)
