= 2001 World Archery Championships =

Beijing archery championship

- Location: Beijing, China
- Start date: 16 September
- End date: 23 September

The 2001 World Archery Championships was the 41st edition of the event. It was held in Beijing, China on 16–23 September 2001 and was organized by World Archery Federation (FITA).

== Medals table ==
* Host nation (China)

Rank	Nation	Gold	Silver	Bronze	Total
1	South Korea	3	1	2	6
2	France	1	1	0	2
2	Sweden	1	1	0	2
4	China*	1	0	1	2
4	Norway	1	0	1	2
6	Slovenia	1	0	0	1
7	Italy	0	3	0	3
8	Germany	0	2	0	2
9	Finland	0	0	1	1
9	Great Britain	0	0	1	1
9	Netherlands	0	0	1	1
9	Ukraine	0	0	1	1
Totals (12 entries)		8	8	8	24

== Medals summary ==
=== Recurve ===
Event	Gold	Silver	Bronze
Men's individual	Yeon Jung-ki; South Korea	Lionel Torres; France	Park Kyung-mo; South Korea
Women's individual	Park Sung-hyun; South Korea	Kim Kyung-wook; South Korea	Kateryna Palekha; Ukraine
Men's team	South Korea; Yeon Jung-ki; Lee Chang-hwan; Park Kyung-mo	Italy; Michele Frangilli; Ilario di Buo; Matteo Bisiani	China; Chen Hongyuan; Sun Jian; Yang Bo
Women's team	China; Zhang Juanjuan; He Ying; Yang Jianping	Italy; Natalia Valeeva; Irene Franchini; Roberta Allodi	South Korea; Choi Nam-ok; Park Sung-hyun; Kim Kyung-wook

=== Compound ===
Event	Gold	Silver	Bronze
Men's individual	Dejan Sitar; Slovenia	Morgan Lundin; Sweden	Morten Bøe; Norway
Women's individual	Ulrika Sjöwall; Sweden	Bettina Thiele; Germany	Sirkka Sokka-Matikainen; Finland
Men's team	Norway; Morten Bøe; Sigmund Johansen; Kolbjoern Flaa	Germany; Robert Hesse; Stefan Griem; Rainer Voss	United Kingdom; Chris White; Michael Peart; Jonathan Mynott
Women's team	France; Maggy Masson; Catherine Pellen; Valerie Fabre	Italy; Stefania Montagnoni; Assunta Atorino; Francesca Peracino	Netherlands; Irma Luyting; Marjon Pigney; Olga Zandvliet
