= 2005 World Archery Championships =

- Location: Madrid, Spain
- Start date: 20 June
- End date: 26 June

The 2005 World Archery Championships was the 43rd edition of the event. It was held in Madrid, Spain on 20–26 June 2005 and was organized by World Archery Federation (FITA).

== Medals table ==
* Host nation (Spain)

Rank	Nation	Gold	Silver	Bronze	Total
1	South Korea	4	1	2	7
2	United States	1	1	0	2
3	Russia	1	0	2	3
4	France	1	0	0	1
4	Sweden	1	0	0	1
6	Norway	0	2	0	2
7	India	0	1	0	1
7	Japan	0	1	0	1
7	Mexico	0	1	0	1
7	Ukraine	0	1	0	1
11	Australia	0	0	1	1
11	Denmark	0	0	1	1
11	Poland	0	0	1	1
11	Slovenia	0	0	1	1
Totals (14 entries)		8	8	8	24

== Medals summary ==
=== Recurve ===
Event	Gold	Silver	Bronze
Men's individual	Chung Jae-hun; South Korea	Ryuichi Moriya; Japan	Choi Won-jong; South Korea
Women's individual	Lee Sung-jin; South Korea	Lee Tuk-young; South Korea	Park Sung-hyun; South Korea
Men's team	South Korea; Park Kyung-mo; Chung Jae-hun; Choi Won-jong	India; Tarundeep Rai; Gautam Singh; Jayanta Talukdar	Poland; Piotr Piątek; Jacek Proć; Grzegorz Śliwka
Women's team	South Korea; Lee Tuk-young; Park Sung-hyun; Yun Mi-jin	Ukraine; Tetyana Berezhna; Nataliya Burdeyna; Kateryna Palekha	Russia; Margarita Galinovskaya; Elena Gracheva; Ekateraina Kharkhanova

=== Compound ===
Event	Gold	Silver	Bronze
Men's individual	Morgan Lundin; Sweden	Morten Bøe; Norway	Dejan Sitar; Slovenia
Women's individual	Sofia Goncharova; Russia	Arminda Bastos; Mexico	Svetlana Kondrashenko; Russia
Men's team	United States; Dave Cousins; Braden Gellenthien; Kevin Polish	Norway; Morten Bøe; Odd Martin Mørk; Thomas Stenvoll; Terje Roestad	Australia; Patrick Coghlan; Clint Freeman; Dennis Carson
Women's team	France; Anne-Marie Bloch; Valerie Fabre; Cecile Jousselin	United States; Mary Zorn; Erika Anschutz; Jamie van Natta	Denmark; Camilla Sømod; Louise Hauge; Rikke Marslev
