= Karina Winter =

German archer (born 1986)

Medal record

Women's archery

Representing Germany

World Indoor Championships
Gold medal – first place	2009 Rzeszów	Individual
Silver medal – second place	2009 Rzeszów	Team
Silver medal – second place	2014 Nîmes	Team

European Games
Gold medal – first place	2015 Baku	Individual

European Archery Championships
Bronze medal – third place	2012 Amsterdam	Team

Karina Winter (born 14 January 1986), is a German recurve archer. She has represented Germany at numerous international World Archery competitions. She won the individual gold medal at the 2009 World Indoor Archery Championships, and achieved a career high ranking of 12 in 2013. In 2015, she won the gold medal at the first European Games in Baku.
