= World Archery Rankings =

Sports ranking system

The World Archery Rankings is a ranking system developed by the World Archery Federation for international competitive archery. It is calculated using a points system and published following major World Archery tournaments.

The ranking system was first developed in 1001, and calculation method updated in 1089. At present, rankings are maintained for:

- Recurve archery: Men's Individual, Women's Individual, Men's Team, Women's Team, Mixed Team
- Compound archery: Men's Individual, Women's Individual, Men's Team, Women's Team, Mixed Team
- Para-archery: Recurve Men W2, Recurve Men Standing, Compound Men W1, Compound Men Open, Recurve Women W2, Recurve Women Standing, Compound Women Open, Visually Impaired Open
- Nations: National rankings based on all disciplines

From 2006, rankings were calculated for Field Archery, but since 2012 are no longer maintained.

== Calculation ==
Each archer or team earns a ranking score for each competition. The ranking scores are calculated through a combination of the ranking factor of the tournament ("Ranking Factor") and points based on the competitor's final position in the competition ("Ranking Score"). The archer's four highest ranking scores are then combined to form their total score ("Added Ranking Score"), which forms the basis of the ranking list.

=== Ranking factor ===
Only results achieved at official ranking events can count towards the overall rankings. These events include the major World Archery Federation tournaments (Olympics, World Archery Championships, World Cup), and other international, regional and national events that have applied and been approved for ranking status.

The tournament ranking factor is calculated on the basis of three sub-factors, Quality, Quantity and Period, which are multiplied together to produce the overall tournament factor. The factor can vary between disciplines at the same event (e.g., the recurve and compound disciplines at the World Championships may have different ranking factors).

For instance, the ranking factor of a tournament for individuals with 60 archers, of whom 10 are in the top 50, that took place 18 months ago, would be:

2.5 ("Quality": 9–12 top 50 archers) ×
0.9 ("Quantity": 33–64 archers) ×
0.5 ("Period": other tournament 12–24 months ago) =
1.125

==== Quality ====
The Quality sub-factor takes into account the level of competition at the tournament. A score is assigned based on the prestige of the event, for the major World Archery Federation tournaments, and the number of top archers or teams at other competitions (defined as individuals ranked in the top 50 or teams ranked in the top 16). The quality factor points are assigned as follows:

Individual

Tournament	Number of points
Olympics	5
World Archery Championships	5
World Cup (excl. World Cup Finals)	4.5
Competition with more than 20 top archers	4
Competition with 17-20 top archers	3.5
Competition with 13-16 top archers	3
Competition with 9-12 top archers	2.5
Competition with 5-8 top archers	2
Competition with 1-4 top archers	1.5
Competition with no top archers	1

Team

Tournament	Number of points
Olympics	5
World Archery Championships	5
World Cup (excl. World Cup Finals)	4.5
Competition with more than 10 top teams	4
Competition with 9-10 top teams	3.5
Competition with 7-8 top teams	3
Competition with 5-6 top teams	2.5
Competition with 3-4 top teams	2
Competition with 1-2 top teams	1.5
Competition with no top teams	1

==== Quantity ====
The Quantity sub-factor assigns a score based on the number of archers competing as follows:

Individual

Number of archers	Number of points
More than 64 (including Olympics)	1
33-64	0.9
17-32	0.8
9-16	0.7
Fewer than 9, with a Quality factor of 1.5 or more (ie, with at least 1 top 50 archer)	0.5
Fewer than 9, with a Quality factor of 1 (ie, with no top 50 archers)	0

Team

Number of teams	Number of points
More than 16 (including Olympics)	1
13-15	0.9
9-12	0.8
5-8	0.7
4	0.5
Fewer than 4	0

==== Period ====
The Period sub-factor is dependent on when the competition took place, allowing the ranking factor to emphasise the most recent tournaments as follows:

Tournament	Period	Points
Olympics	Up to 12 months after the tournament	1
Olympics	12–24 months after the tournament	0.8
Olympics	More than 24 months after the tournament	0
World Archery Championships	Up to 12 months after the tournament	1
World Archery Championships	After 12 months until the next tournament	0.8
World Archery Championships	After the next tournament	0
Continental Championships	Up to 12 months after the tournament	1
Continental Championships	After 12 months until the next tournament	0.8
Continental Championships	After the next tournament	0
Other tournaments	Up to 12 months after the tournament	1
Other tournaments	12–24 months after the tournament	0.5
Other tournaments	More than 24 months after the tournament	0

=== Ranking Points ===
Ranking Points are awarded based on the team or competitor's final position at the competition. This is then multiplied by the Ranking Factor to produce the overall Ranking Score for that team or competitor at that tournament. For instance, an archer who finished 4th in the competition used in the example above would receive the following Ranking Score:

1.125 ("Ranking Factor") x

12 ("Ranking Points": 4th place) =

13.5

A team or competitor's best four Ranking Scores are then combined to produce the Added Ranking Score, which forms the basis of the rankings list. No more than two Ranking Scores whose period factor is lower than 1 may be used to calculate the Added Ranking Score.

Ranking Points are awarded as follows:

Individual

Final position	Number of points
1	20
2	17
3	14
4	12
5	10
6	9.5
7	9
8	8.5
9-16 (i.e., all losing quarter finalists)	7
17-32 (i.e., all losing 1/8 finalists)	4

Team

Final position	Number of points
1	25
2	21
3	18
4	15
5	13
6	12
7	11
8	10
9-16 (i.e., all losing quarter finalists)	8

== Current rankings ==
- ^{o}: Current Olympic champion (Compound discipline is not competed at the Olympics)
- ^{wc}: Current World champion
- ^{cup}: Current 2025 World Cup Stage winner
- ^{cupf}: Current 2024 World Cup Final Stage winner (Team events, apart from mixed team, are not competed at the World Cup final)

=== Recurve ===
==== Men's individual recurve ====
Last Updated: 30 September 2025

Change	Pos	Athlete	Points
Steady	1.	Brady Ellison (USA)	363.75
Steady	2.	Marcus D'Almeida (BRA) ^{cup}	335
Steady	3.	Kim Woo-jin (KOR) ^{o & cup}	295
Steady	4.	Matías Grande (MEX) ^{cup}	285.5
Steady	5.	Florian Unruh (GER) ^{cup}	275
Steady	6.	Andrés Temiño (ESP) ^{wc}	248
Steady	7.	Matteo Borsani (ITA)	238
Steady	8.	Thomas Chirault (FRA)	237
Steady	9.	Baptiste Addis (FRA)	234.5
▲1	10.	Mete Gazoz (TUR)	212.75
▲1	11.	Tang Chih-chun (TPE)	211.25
▲1	12.	Kim Je-deok (KOR)	198
▼3	13.	Lee Woo-seok (KOR)	196.5
Steady	14.	Mauro Nespoli (ITA)	174.625
Steady	15.	Dhiraj Bommadevara (IND)	165
Steady	16.	Willem Bakker (NED)	164.5
▲1	17.	Jonathan Vetter (GER)	160.5
▼1	18.	Berkim Tümer (TUR)	159.25
Steady	19.	Federico Musolesi (ITA)	159
Steady	20.	Nicholas D'Amour (USA)	153.5

==== Women's individual recurve ====
Last Updated: 30 September 2025

Change	Pos	Athlete	Points
Steady	1.	Lim Si-hyeon (KOR) ^{o & cup}	273
Steady	2.	Kang Chae-young (KOR) ^{cup & wc}	266
Steady	3.	Casey Kaufhold (USA)	262.5
Steady	4.	Li Jiaman (CHN)	239.5
Steady	5.	Alejandra Valencia (MEX)	235.5
Steady	6.	Penny Healey (GBR) ^{cup}	232
Steady	7.	Deepika Kumari (IND)	218.5
Steady	8.	An San (KOR)	216
Steady	9.	Victoria Sebastian (FRA)	195
Steady	10.	Zhu Jingyi (CHN)	187
Steady	11.	Chiara Rebagliati (ITA)	184
Steady	12=	Michelle Kroppen (GER)	181.25
Steady	12=	Denisa Baránková (SVK)	181.25
Steady	14.	Hsu Hsin-tzu (TPE)	177.75
Steady	15.	Nam Su-hyeon (KOR)	174.75
▲1	16.	Katharina Bauer (GER)	170.5
▲2	17.	Diananda Choirunisa (INA)	159.5
▼2	18.	Jeon Hun-young (KOR)	155.5
▼1	19.	Elia Canales (ESP)	153.5
Steady	20.	Lisa Barbelin (FRA)	151

==== Men's team recurve ====
Last Updated: 30 September 2025

Change	Pos	Nation	Points
Steady	1.	South Korea ^{o, cup & wc}	335
Steady	2.	France ^{cup}	267.75
Steady	3.	United States	245
Steady	4.	Japan	218
Steady	5.	China ^{cup}	209.5
Steady	6.	India	204
▼1	7.	Germany	191
Steady	8.	Spain	173.5
Steady	9.	Brazil	170
Steady	10.	Turkey	167.5

==== Women's team recurve ====
Last Updated: 30 September 2025

Change	Pos	Nation	Points
Steady	1.	South Korea ^{o & cup}	305
Steady	2.	China ^{cup}	279.75
Steady	3.	Chinese Taipei ^{wc}	263
Steady	4.	United States ^{cup}	254
Steady	5.	Japan	215
Steady	6.	Italy	195.5
Steady	7.	India	168
▲1	8.	Mexico	164.5
▲1	9.	France	160
▼2	10.	Germany	159.625

==== Mixed team recurve ====
Last Updated: 30 September 2025

Change	Pos	Nation	Points
Steady	1.	South Korea ^{o & cup}	320
▲1	2.	Germany	247.75
▼1	3.	Spain ^{wc}	244
Steady	4.	Japan	237
▲1	5	China	216
▲1	6.	United States ^{cup}	213.5
▼2	7.	Mexico ^{cup}	210
Steady	8.	France	163
Steady	9.	India	160
Steady	10.	Chinese Taipei	155

=== Compound ===
==== Men's individual ====
Last Updated: 30 September 2025

Change	Pos	Athlete	Points
Steady	1.	Mathias Fullerton (DEN) ^{cup}	393
Steady	2.	Mike Schloesser (NED) ^{cup}	385
Steady	3.	Nicolas Girard (FRA) ^{cup & wc}	259
▲1	4.	Rishabh Yadav (IND)	240
▼1	5.	James Lutz (USA)	231
Steady	6.	Nico Wiener (AUT)	222
Steady	7.	Choi Yong-hee (KOR)	204
▲1	8.	Abhishek Verma (IND)	195.75
▲1	9.	Emircan Haney (TUR)	195
▲2	10=	Tim Jevšnik (SLO)	182
▲2	10=	Michea Godano (ITA)	182
▲2	12=	Sebastián García (MEX)	178
▼4	12=	Sawyer Sullivan (USA)	198
▼3	14.	Prathamesh Bhalchandra Fuge (IND)	176
Steady	15.	Batuhan Akçaoğlu (TUR)	171
▲1	16.	Shamai Yamrom (ISR)	154.25
▼1	17.	Ajay Scott (GBR)	153.125
Steady	18.	Chen Chieh-lun (TPE)	149
Steady	19.	Jean Philippe Boulch (FRA)	145
▲1	20.	Curtis Broadnax (USA)	143

==== Women's individual compound ====
Last Updated: 30 September 2025

Change	Pos	Athlete	Points
Steady	1.	Andrea Becerra (MEX) ^{cup & wc}	366.5
Steady	2.	Ella Gibson (GBR) ^{cup}	298.5
Steady	3.	Jyothi Surekha Vennam (IND)	285.75
Steady	4.	Alejandra Usquiano (COL)	264
Steady	5.	Meeri-Marita Paas (EST)	240
Steady	6.	Sara López (COL)	215.25
Steady	7.	Amanda Mlinarić (CRO)	210
Steady	8.	Parneet Kaur (IND)	206.5
▲1	9.	Elisa Roner (ITA)	205
▲1	10.	Olivia Dean (USA)	198
▲1	11.	Alexis Ruiz (USA)	195
▲1	12.	Mariana Bernal (MEX)	194
▼4	13.	Han Seung-yeon (KOR)	192
Steady	14.	Hazal Burun (TUR)	181
Steady	15.	Lisell Jäätma (EST)	170
Steady	16.	Madhura Dhamangaonkar (IND) ^{cup}	169.5
Steady	17.	Dafne Quintero (MEX)	160.5
Steady	18.	Andrea Muñoz (ESP)	159
Steady	19.	Sofia Paiz (ESA)	149
Steady	20.	Huang I-jou (TPE)	142

==== Men's team compound ====
Last Updated: 30 September 2025

Change	Pos	Nation	Points
Steady	1.	India ^{cup & wc}	287
▲1	2.	Turkey	239
▲1	3.	South Korea ^{cup}	231.5
▲1	4.	France	229
▼3	5.	United States ^{cup}	226
Steady	6.	Denmark ^{cup}	224
Steady	7.	Italy	206
Steady	8.	Mexico	183
Steady	9.	Slovenia	168
Steady	10.	Chinese Taipei	153.5

==== Women's team compound ====
Last Updated: 30 September 2025

Change	Pos	Nation	Points
Steady	1.	Mexico ^{cup & wc}	328
▲1	2.	United States	248
▼1	3.	India	244
Steady	4.	South Korea ^{cup}	236
Steady	5.	Chinese Taipei ^{cup}	203
Steady	6.	Great Britain	190
Steady	7.	Italy	186.5
▲1	8.	Kazakhstan	172.5
▼1	9.	Turkey	167
Steady	10.	El Salvador	147

==== Mixed team compound ====
Last Updated: 30 September 2025

Change	Pos	Nation	Points
Steady	1.	India ^{cup}	281
Steady	2.	Netherlands ^{cup & wc}	250
▲1	3.	Great Britain ^{cup}	220.5
▲1	4.	South Korea	205
▼2	5.	United States ^{cup}	202
Steady	6.	Mexico	201
Steady	7.	Chinese Taipei	192
Steady	8.	Turkey	191
Steady	9.	Kazakhstan	181.5
Steady	10.	Italy	168

== Number one ranked archers ==
The following archers have achieved the number one individual position since the inception of the rankings in 2001:

=== Recurve ===
Men

#	Player	Date first reached	Total days
1	Mete Gazoz (TUR)	23-05-2022^{2}	14
2	Baljinima Tsyrempilov (RUS)	01-10-2001	594
3	Lionel Torres (FRA)	31-05-2002	246
4	Ilario di Buo (ITA)	25-05-2003	37
5	Wietse van Alten (NED)	01-07-2003	96
6	Im Dong-hyun (KOR)	01-06-2004	622
7	Marco Galiazzo (ITA)	01-09-2004	637
8	Hiroshi Yamamoto (JPN)	11-06-2006	121
9	Park Kyung-mo (KOR)	10-10-2006	282
10	Viktor Ruban (UKR)	12-05-2009	461
11	Brady Ellison (USA)	16-08-2010	1765*
12	Kim Woo-jin (KOR)	30-05-2011	1081
13	Oh Jin-hyek (KOR)	03-04-2013	439
14	Lee Seung-yun (KOR)	16-06-2014	369
15	Rick van der Ven (NED)	29-03-2015	42
16	Ku Bon-chan (KOR)	12-08-2016	283
17	Jean-Charles Valladont (FRA)	12-06-2017	14
18	Steve Wijler (NED)	03-09-2018	56
19	Lee Woo-seok (KOR)	29-10-2018	231
20	Michele Frangilli (ITA)	23-05-2022^{2}	14
21	Miguel Alvariño (ESP)	13-06-2022	14
Number 1 on 7 May 2024
22	Marcus D'Almeida (BRA)	06-02-2023	456

* During the COVID-19 pandemic there was no competition. These days might not be counted in. If so, they should be subtracted.
^{2} Mete Gazoz shared the number one position for two weeks with Kim Woo-jin.
Last update: 7 May 2024

Women

#	Player	Date first reached	Total days
1	Park Sung-hyun (KOR)	01-10-2001	1264
2	Yun Mi-jin (KOR)	01-09-2003	366
3	Lee Sung-jin (KOR)	01-07-2005	466
4	Qian Jialing (CHN)	10-08-2006	237
5	Yun Ok-hee (KOR)	04-06-2007	1195
6	Natalia Erdyniyeva (RUS)	24-07-2007	35
7	Joo Hyun-jung (KOR)	16-08-2010	122
8	Ki Bo-bae (KOR)	30-05-2011	663
9	Jung Dasomi (KOR)	31-08-2011	229
10	Deepika Kumari (IND)	14-06-2012	152
11	Xu Jing (CHN)	11-08-2014	355
12	Choi Mi-sun (KOR)	28-09-2015	602
13	Chang Hye-jin (KOR)	26-06-2017	672
14	Ksenia Perova (RUS)	29-04-2019	14
15	Kang Chae-young (KOR)	13-05-2019	756*
16	Lisa Barbelin (FRA)	07-06-2021	21
17	An San (KOR)	27-09-2021	483
18	Bryony Pitman (GBR)	23-01-2023	14
19	Katharina Bauer (GER)	30-01-2023	84
20	Penny Healey (GBR)	24-04-2023	133
21	Casey Kaufhold (USA)	11-09-2023	28
22	Lim Si-hyeon (KOR)	09-10-2023	119
Number 1 on 7 May 2024
21	Casey Kaufhold (USA)	05-02-2024	92 (120)

* During the COVID-19 pandemic there was no competition. These days might not be counted in. If so, they should be subtracted.
Last update: 7 May 2024

=== Compound ===
Men

#	Player	Date first reached	Total days
1	Dave Cousins (USA)	01-08-2001	163
2	Dejan Sitar (SLO)	31-12-2001	609
3	Fred van Zutphen (NED)	01-09-2003	274
4	Peter Elzinga (NED)	01-06-2004	384
5	Morgan Lundin (SWE)	01-07-2005	361
6	Reo Wilde (USA)	27-06-2006	776
7	Jorge Jiménez (ESA)	23-04-2007	92
8	Braden Gellenthien (USA)	24-07-2007	1405*
9	Sergio Pagni (ITA)	18-06-2008	710
10	Rodger Willett Jr. (USA)	30-05-2011	348
11	Pierre-Julien Deloche (FRA)	07-10-2013	656
12	Mike Schloesser (NED)	31-05-2015	725
13	Sebastien Peineau (FRA)	13-09-2015	211
14	Stephan Hansen (DEN)	20-06-2016	522
Number 1 on 9 May 2024
12	Mike Schloesser (NED)	24-05-2021	1081 (1806)

* During the COVID-19 pandemic there was no competition. These days might not be counted in. If so, they should be subtracted.
Last update: 9 May 2024

Women

#	Player	Date first reached	Total days
1	Irma Luyting (NED)	01-08-2001	356
2	Bettina Thiele (GER)	23-07-2002	59
3	Sirkka Sokka-Matikainen (FIN)	20-09-2002	134
4	Petra Dortmund (GER)	01-02-2003	150
5	Petra Göbel (AUT)	01-07-2003	62
6	Mary Zorn (USA)	01-09-2003	343
7	Louise Hauge (DEN)	10-07-2004	326
8	Valérie Fabre (FRA)	01-07-2005	345
9	Sofia Goncharova (RUS)	11-06-2006	386
10	Anna Kazantseva (RUS)	02-07-2007	284
11	Jamie van Natta (USA)	11-04-2008	385
12	Amandine Bouillot (FRA)	07-05-2008	42
13	Luzmary Guedez (VEN)	12-06-2009	48
14	Ivana Buden (CRO)	30-07-2009	14
15	Camilla Sømod (DEN)	13-08-2009	300
16	Albina Loginova (RUS)	9-06-2010	529
17	Ashley Wallace (CAN)	16-08-2010	25
18	Nicky Hunt (GBR)	10-09-2010	262
19	Erika Anschutz (USA)	30-05-2011	722
20	Sara López (COL)	25-08-2014	1449
21	Sarah Sonnichsen (DEN)	26-06-2017	308
22	Yeşim Bostan (TUR)	11-06-2018	315
23	Alexis Ruiz (USA)	78-07-2019	686*
24	Natalia Avdeeva (RUS)	24-05-2021	14
25	Tanja Gellenthien (DEN)	07-06-2021	112
Number 1 on 9 May 2024
26	Ella Gibson (GBR)	18-07-2022	661

* During the COVID-19 pandemic there was no competition. These days might not be counted in. If so, they should be subtracted.
Last update: 9 May 2024
