= Michele Frangilli =

Italian archer (born 1976)

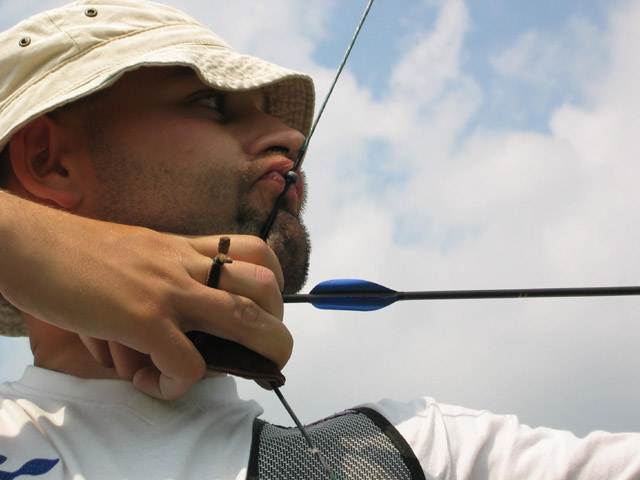

Personal information
- Born: 1 May 1976 (age 50) Gallarate, Lombardy, Italy
Medal record
Men's archery
Representing Italy
Olympic Games
Gold medal – first place	2012 London	Team
Silver medal – second place	2000 Sydney	Team
Bronze medal – third place	1996 Atlanta	Team
World Championships
Gold medal – first place	1999 Riom	Team (recurve)
Gold medal – first place	2003 New York	Individual (recurve)
Silver medal – second place	1995 Jakarta	Team (recurve)
Silver medal – second place	2001 Beijing	Team (recurve)
Silver medal – second place	2015 Copenhagen	Team (recurve)
Bronze medal – third place	2003 New York	Team (recurve)
Bronze medal – third place	2011 Turin	Team (recurve)
World Junior Championships
Gold medal – first place	1994 Roncegno	Team
Silver medal – second place	1993 Moliet	Team
World Indoor Championships
Gold medal – first place	2001 Florence	Individual
Gold medal – first place	2001 Nimes	Team
Gold medal – first place	2007 Izmir	Team
Silver medal – second place	2003 Nimes	Individual
Silver medal – second place	2007 Rzeszów	Team
Bronze medal – third place	1997 Cuba	Team
Bronze medal – third place	2001 Florence	Team
World Field Championships
Gold medal – first place	2000 Cortina	Individual
Gold medal – first place	2002 Canberra	Individual
Gold medal – first place	2006 Goteborg	Individual
Gold medal – first place	2008 Llwynypia	Team
Bronze medal – third place	2002 Canberra	Team
Bronze medal – third place	2006 Goteborg	Team
Bronze medal – third place	2010 Visegard	Team
European Championships
Gold medal – first place	1998 Boe'	Team
Gold medal – first place	2002 Oulu	Individual
Silver medal – second place	1996 Kranska Gora	Team
Bronze medal – third place	2002 Oulu	Team
Bronze medal – third place	2006 Athens	Team
Mediterranean Games
Silver medal – second place	2013 Mersin	Individual
Bronze medal – third place	2013 Mersin	Team

Michele Frangilli (born 1 May 1976) is an Italian archer.

== Biography ==
He was born in Gallarate. He competed at the 1996 Summer Olympics in men's individual archery, finishing in 6th place and winning the bronze medal in the team event. He also competed at the 2000 Summer Olympics in men's individual archery, finishing in 10th place and winning the silver medal in the team event. In 2003 he has won the World Target Archery Championships for Recurve (Olympic) Division in New York.

Frangilli competed at the 2004 Summer Olympics in men's individual archery. He won his first match, advancing to the round of 32. In the second round of elimination, he was defeated by Hiroshi Yamamoto of Japan, the eventual silver medalist. His final rank was 31st overall. Frangilli was also a member of the 7th-place Italian men's archery team at the 2004 Summer Olympics.

Frangilli scored a 10 with the last arrow to dramatically win the men's archery team gold medal final against the US at the 2012 Summer Olympics.

Frangilli has, up to now, won 11 Titles of World Champion for Recurve Bow in various disciplines, including Indoor, Target and Field Archery, so being the only one in the story of recurve archery to win World Champion titles in all the three specialties, for both individual and team. He also co-authored in 2005 a book on Olympic archery technique, entitled The Heretic Archer, with his father and coach, Vittorio Frangilli. He is a former world number one ranked men's recurve archer.

In 2014, using his nickname "GILLO", he has registered a new brand for archery products named "GILLO Gold Medal"

== Records ==
- Current world record holder 25 meter 60 arrows, shot on 21 November 2001(Gallarate, ITA): 300+298=598
- Former world record holder 18 meter 60 arrows, shot on 13 January 2001(Nîmes, FRA): 597
- Current world record holder 36 arrow final round, shot on 3 March 2004(Caorle, ITA): 358
- He was also knighted by the Italian government.

== Individual performance timeline ==
Tournament	1995	1996	1997	1998	1999	2000	2001	2002	2003	2004	2005	2006	2007	2008	2009	2010	2011	2012	2013	2014	SR
World Archery tournaments
Olympic Games		QF				3R				2R								1R			0/4
World Championships	2R		QF		QF		3R		W		2R		2R				2R		1R		1/9
World Cup																					
Stage 1												2R	2R			2R	3R	2R	1R		0/6
Stage 2												4th	W			2nd	3R	3R	3R	4R	1/7
Stage 3												QF	2R			3R	3R	QF		1R	0/6
Stage 4												3R	3R			QF				3R	0/4
World Cup Final												DNQ	4th			QF	DNQ	DNQ	DNQ	DNQ	0/2
End of year world ranking							5	2	1	3	5	9	7	40	258	3	15	28	40	32	
