= Zhao Ling =

Chinese archer (born 1981)

Personal information
- Born: October 7, 1981 (age 44)
Medal record
Women's archery
Representing China
World Cup Final
Gold medal – first place	2009 Copenhagen	Mixed team
Asian Games
Silver medal – second place	2006 Doha	Team
Bronze medal – third place	2006 Doha	Individual

Zhao Ling (born October 7, 1981) is a Chinese archer, who won the silver medal in the team and a bronze in the individual competition at the 2006 Asian Games.
