= Lai Yi-hsin =

Taiwanese archer

Personal information
- Born: 8 November 1988 (age 37)
Medal record
Women's Archery
Representing Chinese Taipei
Asian Games
Bronze medal – third place	2006 Doha	Team

Lai Yi Hsin (born 8 November 1988) is a Taiwanese archer representing Chinese Taipei, who won the bronze medal in the team competition at the 2006 Asian Games.
