= Lin Hua-shan =

Taiwanese archer (born 1987)

Personal information
- Born: 3 January 1987 (age 39)
Medal record
Women's Archery
Representing Chinese Taipei
Asian Games
Bronze medal – third place	2006 Doha	Team

Lin Hua Shan (born 3 January 1987) is a Taiwanese archer, who won the bronze medal for Chinese Taipei in the team competition at the 2006 Asian Games. She has competed at the Archery World Cup in 2006 and 2007, though she was defeated each time.
