= 2003 World Archery Championships =

- Location: New York City, United States
- Start date: 14 July
- End date: 20 July

The 2003 World Archery Championships was the 42nd edition of the event. It was held in New York City, New York on 14–20 July 2003 and was organized by World Archery Federation (FITA).

== Medals table ==
* Host nation (United States)

Rank	Nation	Gold	Silver	Bronze	Total
1	South Korea	3	2	1	6
1	United States*	3	2	1	6
3	Italy	1	1	1	3
4	Australia	1	0	1	2
5	France	0	1	0	1
5	Japan	0	1	0	1
5	Sweden	0	1	0	1
8	Canada	0	0	1	1
8	Germany	0	0	1	1
8	Netherlands	0	0	1	1
8	Ukraine	0	0	1	1
Totals (11 entries)		8	8	8	24

== Medals summary ==
=== Recurve ===
Event	Gold	Silver	Bronze
Men's individual	Michele Frangilli; Italy	Im Dong-hyun; South Korea	David Barnes; Australia
Women's individual	Yun Mi-jin; South Korea	Park Sung-hyun; South Korea	Lee Hyun-jeong; South Korea
Men's team	South Korea; Jang Yong-ho; Choi Young-kwang; Im Dong-hyun	Sweden; Magnus Petersson; Mattias Eriksson; Mikael Larsson	Italy; Marco Galiazzo; Michele Frangilli; Ilario di Buo
Women's team	South Korea; Park Sung-hyun; Yun Mi-jin; Lee Hyun-jeong	Japan; Sayami Matsushita; Sayoko Kawauchi; Yukari Kawasaki	Ukraine; Nataliya Burdeyna; Yulia Lobzhenidze; Tetyana Dorokhova

=== Compound ===
Event	Gold	Silver	Bronze
Men's individual	Clint Freeman; Australia	Dave Cousins; United States	Braden Gellenthien; United States
Women's individual	Mary Zorn; United States	Amber Dawson; United States	Irma Luyting; Netherlands
Men's team	United States; Dave Cousins; Braden Gellenthien; Dee Wilde	Italy; Fabio Girardi; Antonio Tosco; Mario Ruele	Canada; Kevin Tataryn; Ed Wilson; Travis Vandaele
Women's team	United States; Mary Zorn; Amber Dawson; Aya Labrie	France; Sandrine Vandionant; Cecile Jousselin; Valerie Fabre	Germany; Petra Dortmund; Andrea Weihe; Dorith Landesfeind
