= Bettina Thiele =

German archer (born 1963)

Personal information
- Born: 26 October 1963 (age 62) Turstenhagen, Germany
Medal record
Women's archery
Representing Germany
World Championships
Silver medal – second place	2001 Beijing	Individual (compound)
Bronze medal – third place	1999 Riom	Team (compound)

Bettina Thiele (born 26 October 1963, in Turstenhagen, Germany) is a retired German athlete who competes in compound archery. Her achievements include a silver medal at the 2001 World Archery Championships, and becoming the world number one ranked archer in July 2002.
