= Louise Hauge =

Danish archer (born 1978)

Medal record

Women's archery

Representing Denmark

World Archery Championships
Bronze medal – third place	2005 Madrid	Team

European Archery Championships
Silver medal – second place	2004 Brussels	Individual

Louise Hauge (born 13 July 1978), is a Danish athlete who competes in compound archery. Her achievements include two gold medals at the European Grand Prix, a silver medal at the 2004 European Archery Championships, and becoming the world number one ranked archer from July 2004 to June 2005.
