= Son Hye-yong =

North Korean archer

- Hangul: 손혜영
- RR: Son Hyeyeong
- MR: Son Hyeyŏng

Son Hye-yong (born February 25, 1980) is an athlete from North Korea who competes in archery.

At the 2008 Summer Olympics in Beijing Son finished her ranking round with a total of 618 points. This gave her the 45th seed for the final competition bracket in which she faced Mariana Avitia in the first round. The archer from Mexico eliminated Son straight away with a 112–107 score.
