= Rachel Cabral =

Filipino archer

Rachelle Anne Cabral-Dela Cruz (born October 5, 1985, in Cagayan Valley, Tuguegarao), is a Filipino archer from the Republic of the Philippines.

Cabral represented the Philippines in Archery at the 2012 Summer Olympics. She underwent 10 days of training in South Korea under Korean coach Chung Jae Yun. Cabral competed in the women's individual event. She scored 627 in the ranking round held on July 28, which placed her 48th out of 64 competitors. In the first round she faced Inna Stepanova of Russia and lost.

She graduated in the University of Makati under the Bachelor in Physical Wellness program in 2011.
