= Qian Jialing =

Chinese archer (born 1988)

Personal information
- Born: February 3, 1988 (age 38)
Medal record
Women's recurve archery
Representing China
Asian Games
Silver medal – second place	2006 Doha	Team
Asian Championships
Gold medal – first place	2005 New Delhi	Team

Qian Jialing (born February 3, 1988) is a Chinese archer and is a former world number one. She won the silver medal in the team competition at the 2006 Asian Games.
