= Bhutan at the 2006 Asian Games =

- IOC code: BHU
- NOC: Bhutan Olympic Committee

in Doha
- Medals: Gold 0 Silver 0 Bronze 0 Total 0

Asian Games appearances (overview)
- 1986; 1990; 1994; 1998; 2002; 2006; 2010; 2014; 2018; 2022; 2026

Bhutan participated in the 15th Asian Games, officially known as the XV Asiad held in Doha from December 1 to December 15, 2006. The athletes represented Bhutan in archery, taekwondo, and tennis in this edition of the Asiad.

== Archery ==
Bhutan sent the following archers to the 2006 Asian Games:

Men

- Rinchen Gyeltshen
- Tashi Peljor
- Chencho Dorji
- Tashi Dorji

Women

- Dorji Dolma
- Dorji Dema
- Tshering Chhoden
- Tenzin Lhamo

== Taekwondo ==
Bhutan sent the following athletes:

Men

- Tandin Dendup 54 kg
- Kinley Rabgay 58 kg
- Tashi Tashi 67 kg
- Tashi Dukpa 72 kg
- Sonam Penjor 78 kg
- Phub Thinley 84 kg

Women

- Sonam Gaki 51 kg
- Sangay Wangmo 63 kg

== Tennis ==
Bhutan sent the following athletes:

- Deepesh Chhetri
- Kinley Wangchuk
