= Petra Dortmund =

German archer (born 1959)

Medal record

Women's archery

Representing Germany

World Championships
Bronze medal – third place	2003 New York	Team

Petra Dortmund (born 26 May 1959, Menden, Germany), is a retired German athlete who competes in compound archery. Her achievements include a gold medal at the 2002 European Grand Prix, and becoming the world number one ranked archer in February 2003.
