= Anna Kazantseva =

Russian archer (born 1972)

Medal record

Women's archery

Representing Russia

World Cup Final
Silver medal – second place	2006 Merida	Individual

Anna Kazantseva (born 11 March 1972 in Moscow, Soviet Union), is a Russian athlete who competes in compound archery. She first represented the national team in 2001, and her achievements include two individual gold medals at the European Grand Prix in 2005 and 2010, stage wins at the FITA Archery World Cup in 2006 (including a silver medal at the World Cup Final), 2007, 2008, and becoming the world number one ranked archer from July 2007 to April 2008.
