= Morten Bøe =

Norwegian archer (born 1971)

Medal record

Men's archery

Representing Norway

World Championships
Gold medal – first place	2001 Beijing	Team
Silver medal – second place	2005 Madrid	Individual
Silver medal – second place	2005 Madrid	Team
Bronze medal – third place	2001 Beijing	Individual

Morten Bøe (born 7 December 1971 in Sandefjord) is a Norwegian athlete who competes in compound archery. He has won four career medals at the World Championships, including a gold medal in 2001.
