= Sirkka Sokka-Matikainen =

Finnish archer

Medal record

Women's archery

Representing Finland

World Championships
Bronze medal – third place	2001 Beijing	Individual

European Archery Championships
Silver medal – second place	2002 Oulu	Team

Sirkka Sokka-Matikainen is a retired Finnish athlete who competes in compound archery. Her achievements include a bronze medal at the 2001 World Archery Championships, a team silver medal at the 2002 European Archery Championships and becoming the world number one ranked archer in September 2002.
