= Valérie Fabre =

French archer (born 1966)

Medal record

Women's archery

Representing France

World Championships
Gold medal – first place	2005 Madrid	Team
Gold medal – first place	2001 Beijing	Team
Silver medal – second place	2003 New York	Team
Bronze medal – third place	1997 Victoria	Team

European Archery Championships
Gold medal – first place	2004 Brussels	Individual

Valerie Fabre (born 30 July 1966) is a French athlete who competes in compound archery. Her achievements include an individual gold medal at the 2004 European Archery Championships, multiple team medals at the World Archery Championships, stage wins at the FITA Archery World Cup in 2006, 2007 and 2008, and becoming the world number one ranked archer from July 2005 to June 2006.
