= Sofia Goncharova =

Russian archer (born 1981)

Medal record

Women's compound archery

Representing Russia

World Championships
Gold medal – first place	2005 Madrid	Individual

Summer Universiade
Bronze medal – third place	2003 Daegu	Individual

World Cup
Gold medal – first place	2006 Merida	Individual
Silver medal – second place	2007 Dubai	Individual

Sofia Goncharova (born 7 June 1981 in Chita, Zabaykalsky Krai) is a Russian athlete who competes in compound archery. She has represented Russia since 2001, and was ranked number one in the world from June 2006 to July 2007.

== Career ==
She has won both major World Archery compound competitions, the World Championships in 2005 and the inaugural World Cup final in 2006, winning three of four stages on the way.
