= Irma Luyting =

Dutch archer (born 1975)

Personal information
- Born: 1 January 1975 (age 51) Koog aan de Zaan
Medal record
Women's archery
Representing Netherlands
World Championships
Silver medal – second place	1999 Riom	Team (compound)
Bronze medal – third place	2001 Beijing	Team (compound)
Bronze medal – third place	2003 New York	Individual (compound)
Indoor World Championships
Bronze medal – third place	2001 Florence	Team

Irma Luyting (born 1 January 1975) is a retired Dutch athlete who competes in compound archery. She won three bronze medals at the World Archery Championships, and was the inaugural world number one ranked archer for nearly one year from August 2001.
