= Mary Hamm (archer) =

American archer (born 1982)

Medal record

Women's compound archery

Representing United States

World Championships
Gold medal – first place	2003 New York	Individual
Gold medal – first place	2003 New York	Team
Silver medal – second place	2005 Madrid	Team

Indoor World Championships
Gold medal – first place	2018 Yankton	Team
Gold medal – first place	2009 Rzeszow	Individual
Gold medal – first place	2009 Rzeszow	Team
Gold medal – first place	2005 Aalborg	Individual
Gold medal – first place	2005 Aalborg	Team
Gold medal – first place	2003 Nîmes	Team
Gold medal – first place	2001 Florence	Individual
Gold medal – first place	2001 Florence	Team
Bronze medal – third place	2003 Nîmes	Individual

Summer Universiade
Gold medal – first place	2003 Daegu	Team
Silver medal – second place	2003 Daegu	Individual

Mary Hamm (born Mary Zorn, 12 April 1982) is an American athlete who competes in compound archery. Her achievements include gold medals at the World Archery Championships and Indoor World Championships, and becoming the world number one ranked archer on two occasions in September 2003 and July 2005.
