= Park Sung-hyun (archer) =

South Korean archer (born 1983)

Personal information
- Born: 1 January 1983 (age 43) Incheon, Gyeonggi Province, South Korea
- Height: 172 cm (5 ft 8 in)

Sport
- Sport: Archery
- Event: Recurve archery
Medal record
Women's recurve archery
Representing South Korea
Olympic Games
Gold medal – first place	2004 Athens	Individual
Gold medal – first place	2004 Athens	Team
Gold medal – first place	2008 Beijing	Team
Silver medal – second place	2008 Beijing	Individual
World Championships
Gold medal – first place	2001 Beijing	Individual
Gold medal – first place	2003 New York City	Team
Gold medal – first place	2005 Madrid	Team
Gold medal – first place	2007 Leipzig	Team
Silver medal – second place	2003 New York City	Individual
Silver medal – second place	2007 Leipzig	Individual
Bronze medal – third place	2001 Beijing	Team
Bronze medal – third place	2005 Madrid	Individual
World Cup Final
Silver medal – second place	2008 Lausanne	Individual
Asian Games
Gold medal – first place	2002 Busan	Team
Gold medal – first place	2006 Doha	Individual
Gold medal – first place	2006 Doha	Team
Asian Championships
Gold medal – first place	2005 New Delhi	Individual
Silver medal – second place	2005 New Delhi	Team
Summer Universiade
Gold medal – first place	2003 Daegu	Team
Gold medal – first place	2003 Daegu	Individual

Korean name
- Hangul: 박성현
- Hanja: 朴成賢
- RR: Bak Seonghyeon
- MR: Pak Sŏnghyŏn

Park Sung-hyun (Korean: 박성현; Hanja: 朴成賢; born 1 January 1983) is an archer from South Korea who competed in two Olympic Games, winning three gold medals. Park made her international archery debut in 2001, winning the women's recurve title at that year's World Archery Championships. Her Olympic debut came at the 2004 Summer Olympics, where she won gold medals in both the women's individual and women's team events. She won two further medals at the 2008 Summer Olympics, achieving her third Olympic gold in the women's team event before earning the silver medal as the runner-up in the women's individual event.

During her career Park achieved success in a variety of international competitions. She was the first South Korean archer to achieve gold medals at the Olympics, the World Championships, the Asian Games, and the Asian Championships. She was the first recurve archer to post at least 1,400 points in a 144-arrow round, and was from 2004 to 2015 the world record holder for the women's 72-arrow round. In 2016 the World Archery Federation named her as the greatest Olympic archer of the 21st century and the third greatest archer of all time.

== Early and personal life ==
Park was born on 1 January 1983 in Incheon. She married fellow archer and Olympic gold medalist Park Kyung-mo in December 2008, disclosing their intention to wed following the 2008 Summer Olympics to avoid disrupting the national team during the Olympic competitions. As of the 2008 Summer Olympics Park lived in Gunsan in western South Korea. She has three daughters.

== Career ==
=== Olympic career ===
==== 2004 Summer Olympics ====
Park began the 2004 Summer Olympics in Athens with a new women's world record for the preliminary 72-arrow ranking round, scoring 682 points (from a maximum of 720) to surpass the previous best of 679 set by Italy's Natalia Valeeva three months earlier. The score did not count as Olympic record because the ranking round took place prior to the Olympic opening ceremony. With teammates Lee Sung-jin and Yun Mi-jin she also set a new world record for the women's team event over 216 arrows, the three scoring a combined total of 2,030 points from a maximum of 2,160. Because the ranking round took place prior to the opening ceremony, neither score was classified as a new Olympic record.

Park and Lee both advanced to the final of the women's individual competition, where Park defeated her teammate by a score of 110–108 over twelve arrows to take the gold medal, South Korea's sixth in the event. Park won her second gold two days later when she, Lee, and Yun outscored China by a single point in the final of the women's team event to achieve their nation's fifth consecutive gold medal in the discipline. As the designated final shooter in the team, Park was responsible for scoring the ten points on the last arrow required to win the match.

==== 2008 Summer Olympics ====
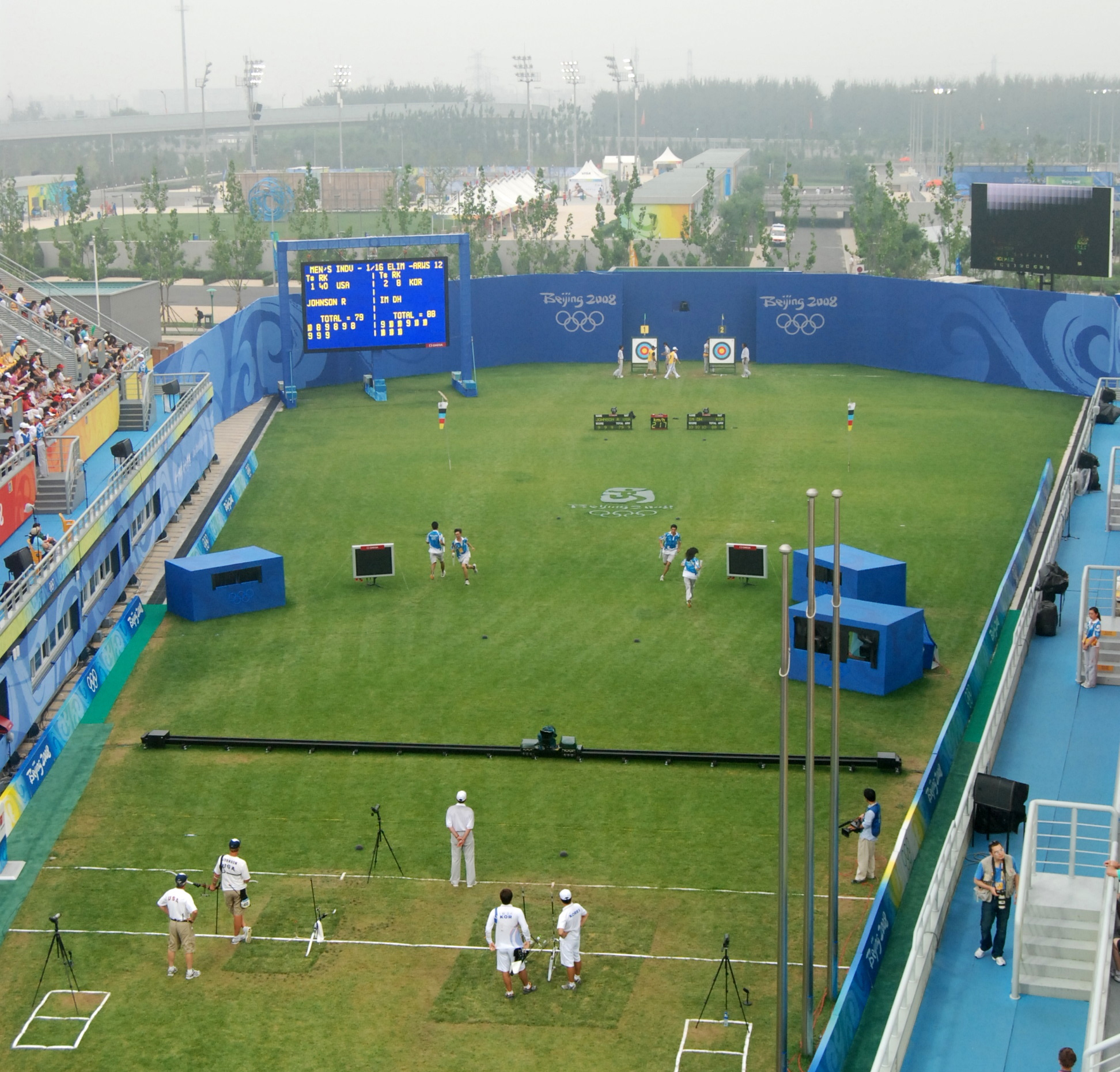
The Olympic Green Archery Field in Beijing, where Park was defeated by Zhang Juanjuan in the women's individual final at the 2008 Olympics

Heading into the 2008 Summer Olympics in Beijing Park was favoured to defend her Olympic titles. She and her teammate Yun Ok-hee were named as the favourites to take the women's individual gold medal, and the South Korean team were highly tipped to retain their women's team title for a sixth consecutive Olympic Games. Park began by scoring 673 points in the ranking round for the women's individual event, concluding the round in first place and equalling the existing Olympic record set by Ukraine's Lina Herasymenko at the 1996 Summer Olympics. With a combined tally of 2,004 points, Park, Yun, and Joo Hyun-jung also achieved a new Olympic record for the women's team event. The trio went on to defeat Italy, France, and China in succession to take a sixth successive Olympic title in the women's team competition.

Park was also successful in progressing to her second Olympic women's individual final. Her opponent was China's Zhang Juanjuan, who had finished the ranking round in twenty-seventh position and had earlier eliminated Park's teammates Yun and Joo en route to the gold medal match. The match marked the third time the pair had met in an Olympic final after contesting the last two finals of the women's team event. In a close match Zhang defeated Park one point, becoming the first archer from outside South Korea to win the women's individual title in twenty-four years and breaking what was then the sixth-longest Olympic winning streak. In a press conference following the match Park expressed disappointment about failing to maintain South Korea's winning record, but spoke of her silver medal result giving her the motivation and drive to seek further gold medals. She also felt that her loss would lighten the pressure placed on Korean archers to see victory as the only acceptable result in future competitions. Speaking about her defeat in 2016, Park reflected that she "was maybe too greedy about getting the gold medal. I ended up not being careful enough with my actions."

=== World Championships ===
Park contested every edition of the biennial World Archery Championships from 2001 to 2007, winning a medal in each of her four appearances. She became the women's recurve world champion at the age of eighteen in 2001, and with teammates Yun Mi-jin and Lee Hyun-jung dominated the women's individual event at the 2003 Championships in New York City. Having finished the ranking round in the top three positions, Park, Yun, and Lee all advanced to the medal matches, where Park lost to Yun in the final to finish with the silver medal as runner-up.

Park was joined by Lee Sung-jin and Lee Tuk-young for the 2005 Championships in Madrid. The South Korean team was dominant once more, winning the gold medal in all four recurve competitions for the first time since 1997. Park, Lee, and Lee retained the women's team title with victory over Ukraine, though a semi-final loss to Lee Sung-jin eliminated Park from gold medal contention in women's individual event. Park later defeated Natalia Valeeva of Italy to win the bronze medal. The 2007 Championships in Leipzig saw Park contribute to South Korea's third consecutive women's team title with Lee Tuk-young and Choi Eun-young.

=== Asian Games ===
Park competed at the 2002 Asian Games, where she won a gold medal in the team event. At the 2006 Asian Games in Doha Park achieved two gold medals. Her first came in the women's individual event, where she defeated compatriot Yun Ok-hee in the final to claim her first individual title at the Games. Park's second gold medal was won in the women's team event where she, Yun, and Yun Mi-jin defeated China to win a third consecutive title for South Korea, setting a new Asian Games record for a 24-arrow match in the process. Afterwards Park said she felt greater satisfaction in winning the team event and expressed joy that the tournament was over in light of the pressure placed upon the South Korean team.

== Records ==
At the 2004 Summer Olympics Park set a new world record for the women's 72-arrow round with 682 points from a maximum of 720. Her score would remain unbroken for almost eleven years before her compatriot Ki Bo-bae scored 686 points during the Summer Universiade in July 2015. At the 2008 Olympics Park scored an Olympic-record 115 points from a possible 120 for the 12-arrow match, a tally matched hours later by Zhang Juanjuan, her eventual opponent in the gold medal match.

Park was the first recurve archer to break the 1,400-point barrier in the 144-arrow round after posting a total of 1,405 points in October 2004. She remained the only archer to achieve this feat for almost fifteen years before compatriot Ryoo Su Jung scored 1,400 points at a national tournament in South Korea in July 2019.

== See also ==
- List of South Korean archers
