= Lee Tuk-young =

South Korean archer (born 1989)

Personal information
- Born: 2 December 1989 (age 36)
Medal record
Women's recurve archery
Representing South Korea
World Championships
Gold medal – first place	2005 Madrid	Team
Gold medal – first place	2007 Leipzig	Team
Silver medal – second place	2005 Madrid	Individual
Asian Games
Gold medal – first place	2006 Doha	Team
Gold medal – first place	2014 Incheon	Team
Asian Championships
Gold medal – first place	2015 Bangkok	Team
Bronze medal – third place	2015 Bangkok	Individual

Lee Tuk-young (Korean: 이특영, born 2 December 1989) is a South Korean archer, who won the gold medal in the team competition at the 2006 Asian Games.
