= 2011 World Archery Championships – Women's team compound =

The women's team compound competition at the 2011 World Archery Championships took place on 4–9 July 2011 in Turin, Italy. 22 teams of three archers competed in the qualification round on 4 July; the top 16 teams qualified for the knockout tournament on 6 July, with the semi-finals and finals on 9 July.

Top seeds United States won the competition, defeating Iran in the final.

== Seeds ==
Seedings were based on the combined total of the team members' qualification scores in the individual ranking rounds. The top 16 teams were assigned places in the draw depending on their overall ranking.

1. (United States) Erika Anschutz / Christie Colin / Jamie van Natta (champions)
2. (South Korea) Seo Jung-hee / Seok Ji-hyun / Yun Jae-won (1st round)
3. (Iran) Vida Halimian / Mahtab Parsamehr / Shabnam Sarlak (2nd place)
4. (Russia) Viktoria Balzhanova / Ekaterina Korobeynikova / Albina Loginova (quarterfinal)
5. (Venezuela) Olga Bosch / Luzmary Guedez / Ana Mendoza (3rd place)
6. (Canada) Camilla Bouffard-Demers / Dawn Groszko / Sonia Schina (quarterfinal)
7. (Netherlands) Wilma In't Panhuis-Heijnen / Irina Markovic / Inge van Caspel (1st round)
8. (Italy) Laura Longo / Eugenia Salvi / Marcella Tonioli (quarterfinal)
9. (Sweden) Isabell Danielsson / Malin Johansson / Ulrika Sjöwall (1st round)
10. (Belgium) Sarah Prieels / Melissa van Parijs / Gladys Willems (quarterfinal)
11. (United Kingdom) Rikki Bingham / Andrea Gales / Lucy Holderness (1st round)
12. (France) Joanna Chesse / Pascale Lebecque / Patricia Tchepikoff (1st round)
13. (Colombia) Natalia Londoño / Maja Marcen / Isabel Salazar (1st round)
14. (Germany) Melanie Mikala / Sabine Sauter / Andrea Weihe (1st round)
15. (Mexico) Ana del Milagro Crisanto / Felissa de la Concha / Linda Ochoa (4th place)
16. (Spain) Fatima Agudo / Irene Cuesta / Elena Garcia (1st round)

== Draw ==
1st round
1	United States	229
16	Spain	217
9	Sweden	221
8	Italy	229
5	Venezuela	224
12	France	223
13	Colombia	215
4	Russia	226
3	Iran	228
14	Germany	222
11	United Kingdom	217
6	Canada	230
7	Netherlands	221
10	Belgium	223
15	Mexico	223
2	South Korea	218

Quarterfinals
1	United States	228
8	Italy	226
5	Venezuela	226
4	Russia	225
3	Iran	221
6	Canada	218
10	Belgium	221
15	Mexico	224

Semifinals
1	United States	230
5	Venezuela	225
3	Iran	230
15	Mexico	222

Finals
1	United States	231
3	Iran	223
Third place
5	Venezuela	220
15	Mexico	215
