= 2011 World Archery Championships – Women's individual compound =

The women's individual compound competition at the 2011 World Archery Championships took place on 5–10 July 2011 in Torino, Italy. As there were fewer than 104 competitors, the 4 July qualification round determined the rankings for the 83 entrants; all archers qualified for the knockout tournament on 7–8 July, with the semi-finals and finals on 9 July.

Second seed Albina Loginova became the first woman to defend the title, defeating Pascale Lebecque in the final.

== Seeds ==
The top eight scorers in the qualifying round were seeded, and received byes to the third round. As there were fewer than 104 entrants, seeds 9-29 also received byes to the second round.

1. (United States) Jamie van Natta (4th round)
2. (Russia) Albina Loginova (Champion)
3. (France) Camille Bouffard-Demers (4th round)
4. (Mexico) Linda Ochoa (3rd round)
5. (South Korea) Seok Ji-hyun (Quarterfinal)
6. (United States) Erika Anschutz (3rd place)
7. (United States) Christie Colin (4th round)
8. (Iran) Mahtab Parsamehr (4th place)

== Draw ==
=== Top half ===
==== Section 1 ====
1st round
1	(United States) Jamie van Natta
Bye
33	(Indonesia) Dellie Threesyadinda	137
80	(Estonia) Maarika Jaatma	133
81	(Indonesia) Della Adisty Handayani	132
32	(United Kingdom) Andrea Gales	142
17	(South Korea) Yun Jae-won
Bye
65	(United Kingdom) Lucy Holderness	133
48	(Colombia) Maja Marcen	140
49	(Belgium) Melissa van Parijs	138
64	(Finland) Susanna Makkonen	132
16	(Sweden) Isabell Danielsson
Bye

2nd round
1	(United States) Jamie van Natta
Bye
33	(Indonesia) Dellie Threesyadinda	137
32	(United Kingdom) Andrea Gales	139
17	(South Korea) Yun Jae-won	136
48	(Colombia) Maja Marcen	141
49	(Belgium) Melissa van Parijs	143
16	(Sweden) Isabell Danielsson	140

3rd round
1	(United States) Jamie van Natta	143
32	(United Kingdom) Andrea Gales	138
48	(Colombia) Maja Marcen	139
49	(Belgium) Melissa van Parijs	136

4th round
1	(United States) Jamie van Natta	140
48	(Colombia) Maja Marcen	142

==== Section 2 ====
1st round
9	(Netherlands) Inge van Caspel
Bye
57	(South Africa) Lizeth De Wet	138
56	(Ukraine) Dina Kuritsyna	140
41	(Germany) Melanie Mikala	143
72	(Lithuania) Jelena Babinina	136
24	(Denmark) Camilla Sømod
Bye
25	(Italy) Eugenia Salvi
Bye
73	(Spain) Irene Cuesta	142
40	(Netherlands) Irina Markovic	136
8	(Iran) Mahtab Parsamehr
Bye

2nd round
9	(Netherlands) Inge van Caspel	141
56	(Ukraine) Dina Kuritsyna	136
41	(Germany) Melanie Mikala	146
24	(Denmark) Camilla Sømod	139
25	(Italy) Eugenia Salvi	140
73	(Spain) Irene Cuesta	142
8	(Iran) Mahtab Parsamehr
Bye

3rd round
9	(Netherlands) Inge van Caspel	142
41	(Germany) Melanie Mikala	138
73	(Spain) Irene Cuesta	138
8	(Iran) Mahtab Parsamehr	140

4th round
9	(Netherlands) Inge van Caspel	138
8	(Iran) Mahtab Parsamehr	142

==== Section 3 ====
1st round
5	(South Korea) Seok Ji-hyun
Bye
37	(Spain) Fatima Agudo	133
76	(South Africa) Jorina Coetzee	138
28	(United Kingdom) Rikki Bingham
Bye
21	(Australia) Cassie McCall
Bye
69	(Norway) Runa Grydeland	136
44	(Singapore) Kimberley Ng Yuqin	138
53	(Australia) Sherry Gale	139^{10}
60	(Venezuela) Ana Mendoza	139^{10*}
12	(Croatia) Ivana Buden
Bye

2nd round
5	(South Korea) Seok Ji-hyun
Bye
76	(South Africa) Jorina Coetzee	137
28	(United Kingdom) Rikki Bingham	141
21	(Australia) Cassie McCall	139
44	(Singapore) Kimberley Ng Yuqin	137
60	(Venezuela) Ana Mendoza	140
12	(Croatia) Ivana Buden	141

3rd round
5	(South Korea) Seok Ji-hyun	142
28	(United Kingdom) Rikki Bingham	141
21	(Australia) Cassie McCall	137
12	(Croatia) Ivana Buden	136

4th round
5	(South Korea) Seok Ji-hyun	143
21	(Australia) Cassie McCall	142

==== Section 4 ====
1st round
13	(Venezuela) Olga Bosch
Bye
61	(Ecuador) Sara Aguas	134
52	(Netherlands) Wilma In't Panhuis-Heijnen	132
45	(Italy) Laura Longo	140
68	(Colombia) Isabel Salazar	144
20	(Russia) Viktoria Balzhanova
Bye
29	(Norway) June Svensen
Bye
77	(Mexico) Felissa de la Concha	131
36	(France) Pascale Lebecque	141
4	(Mexico) Linda Ochoa
Bye

2nd round
13	(Venezuela) Olga Bosch	139^{10}
61	(Ecuador) Sara Aguas	139^{8}
68	(Colombia) Isabel Salazar	139^{10}
20	(Russia) Viktoria Balzhanova	139^{8}
29	(Norway) June Svensen	142
36	(France) Pascale Lebecque	145
4	(Mexico) Linda Ochoa
Bye

3rd round
13	(Venezuela) Olga Bosch	136
68	(Colombia) Isabel Salazar	138
36	(France) Pascale Lebecque	140^{10*}
4	(Mexico) Linda Ochoa	140^{10}

4th round
68	(Colombia) Isabel Salazar	138
36	(France) Pascale Lebecque	144

=== Bottom half ===
==== Section 5 ====
1st round
3	(Canada) Camille Bouffard-Demers
Bye
35	(Russia) Ekaterina Korobeynikova	140
78	(Ukraine) Nataliya Burdeyna	141
83	(Thailand) Narisara Tinbua	122
30	(Austria) Silvia Barckholt	138
19	(Italy) Marcella Tonioli
Bye
67	(Estonia) Mariel Jaatmaa	137
46	(Spain) Elena Garcia	141
51	(Mexico) Ana del Milagro Crisanto	138
62	(Indonesia) Lilies Heliarti	137
14	(South Korea) Seo Jung-hee
Bye

2nd round
3	(Canada) Camille Bouffard-Demers
Bye
78	(Ukraine) Nataliya Burdeyna	138
30	(Austria) Silvia Barckholt	136
19	(Italy) Marcella Tonioli	147
46	(Spain) Elena Garcia	137
51	(Mexico) Ana del Milagro Crisanto	136
14	(South Korea) Seo Jung-hee	143

3rd round
3	(Canada) Camille Bouffard-Demers	141
78	(Ukraine) Nataliya Burdeyna	137
19	(Italy) Marcella Tonioli	144
14	(South Korea) Seo Jung-hee	143

4th round
3	(Canada) Camille Bouffard-Demers	140
19	(Italy) Marcella Tonioli	142

==== Section 6 ====
1st round
11	(Iran) Seyedeh-Vida Halimianavval
Bye
59	(France) Patricia Tschepikoff	137
54	(Canada) Sonia Schina	143
43	(Myanmar) A Ngeain	143
70	(Kazakhstan) Elina Blonskaya	140
22	(Belgium) Sarah Prieels
Bye
27	(Sweden) Malin Johansson
Bye
75	(Japan) Narumi Sato	136
38	(Canada) Dawn Groszko	138
6	(United States) Erika Anschutz
Bye

2nd round
11	(Iran) Seyedeh-Vida Halimianavval	143
54	(Canada) Sonia Schina	138
43	(Myanmar) A Ngeain	138
22	(Belgium) Sarah Prieels	143
27	(Sweden) Malin Johansson	135
38	(Canada) Dawn Groszko	138
6	(United States) Erika Anschutz
Bye

3rd round
11	(Iran) Seyedeh-Vida Halimianavval	141
22	(Belgium) Sarah Prieels	144
38	(Canada) Dawn Groszko	135
6	(United States) Erika Anschutz	144

4th round
22	(Belgium) Sarah Prieels	138
6	(United States) Erika Anschutz	141

==== Section 7 ====
1st round
7	(United States) Christie Colin
Bye
39	(Ukraine) Viktoriya Dyakova	137
74	(Australia) Erika Anear	135
26	(Poland) Anna Stanieczek
Bye
23	(Austria) Petra Göbel
Bye
71	(Sweden) Ulrika Sjöwall	137
42	(Germany) Andrea Weihe	140
55	(Finland) Anne Lantee	142
58	(Finland) Erja Jarvenpaa	126
10	(Philippines) Jennifer Dy Chan
Bye

2nd round
7	(United States) Christie Colin
Bye
39	(Ukraine) Viktoriya Dyakova	138
26	(Poland) Anna Stanieczek	142
23	(Austria) Petra Göbel	138
42	(Germany) Andrea Weihe	137
55	(Finland) Anne Lantee	136
10	(Philippines) Jennifer Dy Chan	140

3rd round
7	(United States) Christie Colin	142
26	(Poland) Anna Stanieczek	141
23	(Austria) Petra Göbel	144^{10}
10	(Philippines) Jennifer Dy Chan	144^{10*}

4th round
7	(United States) Christie Colin	140
10	(Philippines) Jennifer Dy Chan	142

==== Section 8 ====
1st round
15	(Colombia) Natalia Londoño
Bye
63	(New Zealand) Stephanie Croskery	140
50	(Belgium) Gladys Willems	141
47	(Germany) Sabine Sauter	144
66	(New Zealand) Mandy McGregor	131
18	(Venezuela) Luzmary Guedez
Bye
31	(Iran) Shabnam Sarlak	133^{8}
82	(Estonia) Saskia Kaldamae	133^{9}
79	(New Zealand) Anne Mitchell	128
34	(France) Joanna Chesse	139
2	(Russia) Albina Loginova
Bye

2nd round
15	(Colombia) Natalia Londoño	138
50	(Belgium) Gladys Willems	136
47	(Germany) Sabine Sauter	140
18	(Venezuela) Luzmary Guedez	141
82	(Estonia) Saskia Kaldamae	136
34	(France) Joanna Chesse	138
2	(Russia) Albina Loginova
Bye

3rd round
15	(Colombia) Natalia Londoño	133
18	(Venezuela) Luzmary Guedez	137
34	(France) Joanna Chesse	135
2	(Russia) Albina Loginova	141

4th round
18	(Venezuela) Luzmary Guedez	141
2	(Russia) Albina Loginova	143

== Finals ==
Quarterfinals
48	(Colombia) Maja Marcen	141
8	(Iran) Mahtab Parsamehr	143
5	(South Korea) Seok Ji-hyun	145
36	(France) Pascale Lebecque	146
19	(Italy) Marcella Tonioli	142
6	(United States) Erika Anschutz	147
10	(Philippines) Jennifer Dy Chan	142
2	(Russia) Albina Loginova	144

Semifinals
8	(Iran) Mahtab Parsamehr	137
36	(France) Pascale Lebecque	140
6	(United States) Erika Anschutz	142
2	(Russia) Albina Loginova	144

Finals
36	(France) Pascale Lebecque	140
2	(Russia) Albina Loginova	144
Third place
8	(Iran) Mahtab Parsamehr	135
6	(United States) Erika Anschutz	140
