= 2011 World Archery Championships – Men's team compound =

The women's team compound competition at the 2011 World Archery Championships took place on 4–9 July 2011 in Turin, Italy. A number of teams of three archers competed in the qualification round on 4 July; the top 16 teams qualified for the knockout tournament on 6 July, with the semi-finals and finals on 9 July.

Top seeds United States won the competition, defeating Denmark in the final and setting a world record 239 against France in the quarterfinal.

== Seeds ==
Seedings were based on the combined total of the team members' qualification scores in the individual ranking rounds. The top 16 teams were assigned places in the draw depending on their overall ranking.

1. (United States) Jesse Broadwater / Braden Gellenthien / Reo Wilde (champions)
2. (Canada) Christopher Perkins / Simon Rousseau / Dietmar Trillus (3rd place)
3. (Denmark) Martin Damsbo / Torben Johannessen / Patrick Laursen (2nd place)
4. (United Kingdom) James Bingham / Duncan Busby / Chris White (1st round)
5. (South Korea) Choi Yong-hee / Kim Jong-ho / Min Li-hong (4th place)
6. (Russia) Alexander Dambaev / Danzan Khaludorov / Chingese Rinchino (1st round)
7. (Mexico) Gerardo Alvarado / Julio Ricardo Fierro / Angel Ramirez (quarterfinal)
8. (France) Pierre-Julien Deloche / Christophe Doussot / Dominique Genet (quarterfinal)
9. (Venezuela) Eduardo Gonzalez / Gabriel Oliferow / Leandro Rojas (1st round)
10. (Sweden) Magnus Carlsson / Carl-Henrik Gidenskold / Anders Malm (1st round)
11. (South Africa) Gabriel Badenhorst / Seppie Cilliers / Lloyd Reeders (quarterfinal)
12. (Italy) Herian Boccali / Pietro Greco / Sergio Pagni (1st round)
13. (Netherlands) Sander Dolderman / Peter Elzinga / Mike Schloesser (quarterfinal)
14. (Slovenia) David Rebec / Dejan Sitar / Slavko Tursic (1st round)
15. (Germany) Marcus Laube / Julian Scriba / Paul Titscher (1st round)
16. (Spain) Sergio Martinez Garrido / Carlos Paniagua / Francisco Javier Valverde (1st round)

== Draw ==
1st round
1	United States	237
16	Spain	231
9	Venezuela	233
8	France	236
5	South Korea	236
12	Italy	229
13	Netherlands	233
4	United Kingdom	231
3	Denmark	229
14	Slovenia	225
11	South Africa	232
6	Russia	227
7	Mexico	232
10	Sweden	228
15	Germany	232
2	Canada	237

Quarterfinals
1	United States	239
8	France	231
5	South Korea	236
13	Netherlands	231
3	Denmark	233
11	South Africa	232
7	Mexico	228
2	Canada	234

Semifinals
1	United States	233
5	South Korea	227
3	Denmark	237
2	Canada	234

Finals
1	United States	239
3	Denmark	232
Third place
5	South Korea	224
2	Canada	230
