= 2011 World Archery Championships – Compound mixed team =

The mixed team recurve competition at the 2011 World Archery Championships took place on 4–10 July 2011 in Turin, Italy. 33 teams of two archers competed in the qualification round on 4 July; the top 16 teams qualified for the knockout tournament on 6 July, with the semi-finals and finals on 9 July.

Sergio Pagni and Marcella Tonioli won the competition for Italy, setting a world record 158 in the quarter-final against Belgium and defeating the Netherlands in the final.

== Seeds ==
Seedings were based on the combined total of the team members' qualification scores in the individual ranking rounds. The top 16 teams were assigned places in the draw depending on their overall ranking.

1. (United States) Reo Wilde / Jamie van Natta (1st round)
2. (Canada) Christopher Perkins / Camille Bouffard-Demers (quarterfinal)
3. (Iran) Amir Kazempoor / Mahtab Parsamehr (4th place)
4. (Mexico) Gerardo Alvarado / Linda Ochoa (quarterfinal)
5. (South Korea) Choi Yong-hee / Seok Ji-hyun (3rd place)
6. (Russia) Chingese Rinchino / Albina Loginova (1st round)
7. (Netherlands) Peter Elzinga / Inge van Caspel (2nd place)
8. (Denmark) Martin Damsbo / Camilla Sømod (1st round)
9. (Italy) Sergio Pagni / Marcella Tonioli (champions)
10. (Venezuela) Gabriel Oliferow / Olga Bosch (1st round)
11. (France) Dominique Genet / Joanna Chesse (quarterfinal)
12. (United Kingdom) Duncan Busby / Rikki Bingham (1st round)
13. (Sweden) Carl-Henrik Gidenskold / Isabell Danielsson (1st round)
14. (Norway) Morten Bøe / June Svensen (1st round)
15. (Spain) Carlos Paniagua / Fatima Agudo (1st round)
16. (Belgium) Sam Kyritsoglou / Sarah Prieels (quarterfinal)

== Draw ==
1st round
1	United States	153^{20}
16	Belgium	153^{20*}
9	Italy	154
8	Denmark	150
5	South Korea	154
12	United Kingdom	149
13	Sweden	148
4	Mexico	154
3	Iran	150
14	Norway	149
11	France	153
6	Russia	152
7	Netherlands	151
10	Venezuela	143
15	Spain	149
2	Canada	153

Quarterfinals
16	Belgium	151
9	Italy	158
5	South Korea	155
4	Mexico	151
3	Iran	153
11	France	150
7	Netherlands	153
2	Canada	152

Semifinals
9	Italy	154
5	South Korea	152
3	Iran	151
7	Netherlands	155

Finals
9	Italy	154
7	Netherlands	152
Third place
5	South Korea	155
3	Iran	154
