= 2012 Archery World Cup =

International archery competition

The 2012 Archery World Cup was the 7th edition of the annual international archery circuit, organised by the World Archery Federation. As 2012 was an Olympic year, the World Cup consisted of three, not four legs. The best individual and mixed performers in each discipline over the three legs then joined host representatives in qualifying for the finals.

After failing to be selected for the Korean Olympic team, Kim Woo-jin defeated defending champion Brady Ellison in a one arrow shoot-off to win the men's individual recurve world cup final for the second time, while fellow Korean Ki Bo-bae defeated top seed Deepika Kumari to add her first world cup victory to her Olympic title.

In the compound discipline, Braden Gellenthien and Jamie van Natta produced the second consecutive United States clean sweep, while the United States topped the nations ranking for the third consecutive year.

== Competition rules and scoring ==
The compound legs consisted of a 50m qualification round of 72 arrows, followed by the compound round at 50m on a 6-zone target face, using cumulative scoring for all individual, team and mixed competitions. The top seven individual performers (with no more than two from each country,) plus one host nation representative if not already qualified, proceeded to the finals; the top mixed team performer proceeded to face the host nation at the finals, which were the same competition format as the legs. The team competition was not competed at the finals.

The recurve legs consisted of a FITA qualification round, followed by a 72m Olympic set system. The top seven individual performers (with no more than two from each country), plus one host nation representative if not already qualified, proceeded to the finals; the top mixed team performer proceeded to face the host nation at the finals, which were the same competition format as the legs. The team competition was not competed at the finals.

The scores awarded in the legs were as follows:

=== Individual scoring ===
Position	Points
1st place	25
2nd place	21
3rd place	18
4th place	15
5th place	13
6th place	12
7th place	11
8th place	10
9th–16th place	5

=== Mixed team scoring ===
Position	Points
1st place	16
2nd place	12
3rd place	10
4th place	8
5th place	4
6th place	3
7th place	2
8th place	1

== Calendar ==
Stage	Date	Location
1	14–15 April	Shanghai, China
2	5–6 May	Antalya Centennial Archery Field, Antalya, Turkey
3	23–24 June	Ogden, United States
Final	22–23 September	Tokyo, Japan

== Results ==
=== Recurve ===
==== Men's individual ====
Stage	Date	Location	1st place, gold medalist(s)	2nd place, silver medalist(s)	3rd place, bronze medalist(s)	Ref.
1	14 April	(China) Shanghai	(United States) Brady Ellison	(Ukraine) Dmytro Hrachov	(Malaysia) Chu Sian Cheng	
2	5 May	(Turkey) Antalya	(South Korea) Im Dong-hyun	(Ukraine) Markiyan Ivashko	(South Korea) Kim Woo-jin	
3	24 June	(United States) Ogden	(Mexico) Luis Álvarez	(United Kingdom) Laurence Godfrey	(France) Gaël Prévost	
Final	23 September	(Japan) Tokyo	(South Korea) Kim Woo-jin	(United States) Brady Ellison	(France) Gaël Prévost	

==== Women's individual ====
Stage	Date	Location	1st place, gold medalist(s)	2nd place, silver medalist(s)	3rd place, bronze medalist(s)	Ref.
1	14 April	(China) Shanghai	(South Korea) Ki Bo-bae	(China) Fang Yuting	(South Korea) Choi Hyeon-ju	
2	5 May	(Turkey) Antalya	(India) Deepika Kumari	(South Korea) Lee Sung-jin	(Chinese Taipei) Lin Chia-en	
3	24 June	(United States) Ogden	(Russia) Kristina Timofeeva	(United States) Jennifer Nichols	(Mexico) Alejandra Valencia	
Final	23 September	(Japan) Tokyo	(South Korea) Ki Bo-bae	(India) Deepika Kumari	(South Korea) Choi Hyeon-ju	

==== Men's team ====
Stage	Date	Location	1st place, gold medalist(s)	2nd place, silver medalist(s)	3rd place, bronze medalist(s)	Ref.
1	14 April	(China) Shanghai	United States	France	Ukraine	
2	6 May	(Turkey) Antalya	United Kingdom	India	South Korea	
3	24 June	(United States) Ogden	United States	India	United Kingdom	

==== Women's team ====
Stage	Date	Location	1st place, gold medalist(s)	2nd place, silver medalist(s)	3rd place, bronze medalist(s)	Ref.
1	14 April	(China) Shanghai	South Korea	India	China	
2	6 May	(Turkey) Antalya	South Korea	Chinese Taipei	China	
3	24 June	(United States) Ogden	Russia	Mexico	United States	

==== Mixed team ====
Stage	Date	Location	1st place, gold medalist(s)	2nd place, silver medalist(s)	3rd place, bronze medalist(s)	Ref.
1	14 April	(China) Shanghai	Chinese Taipei	Japan	China	
2	6 May	(Turkey) Antalya	South Korea	Italy	Mexico	
3	24 June	(United States) Ogden	United States	Russia	Germany	
Final	23 September	(Japan) Tokyo	United States	Japan	—N/a	

=== Compound ===
==== Men's individual ====
Stage	Date	Location	1st place, gold medalist(s)	2nd place, silver medalist(s)	3rd place, bronze medalist(s)	Ref.
1	15 April	(China) Shanghai	(United States) Reo Wilde	(Mexico) Julio Ricardo Fierro	(France) Dominique Genet	
2	5 May	(Turkey) Antalya	(United States) Reo Wilde	(United States) Braden Gellenthien	(France) Dominique Genet	
3	23 June	(United States) Ogden	(United States) Reo Wilde	(Netherlands) Peter Elzinga	(France) Pierre-Julien Deloche	
Final	22 September	(Japan) Tokyo	(United States) Braden Gellenthien	(United States) Reo Wilde	(Mexico) Julio Ricardo Fierro	

==== Women's individual ====
Stage	Date	Location	1st place, gold medalist(s)	2nd place, silver medalist(s)	3rd place, bronze medalist(s)	Ref.
1	15 April	(China) Shanghai	(Italy) Marcella Tonioli	(Russia) Albina Loginova	(United States) Diane Watson	
2	5 May	(Turkey) Antalya	(Russia) Albina Loginova	(Germany) Christina Berger	(Italy) Marcella Tonioli	
3	23 June	(United States) Ogden	(United States) Christie Colin	(United States) Jamie van Natta	(Germany) Kristina Berger	
Final	22 September	(Japan) Tokyo	(United States) Jamie van Natta	(United Kingdom) Danielle Brown	(United States) Christie Colin	

==== Men's team ====
Stage	Date	Location	1st place, gold medalist(s)	2nd place, silver medalist(s)	3rd place, bronze medalist(s)	Ref.
1	15 April	(China) Shanghai	United States	France	Venezuela	
2	6 May	(Turkey) Antalya	United States	Denmark	Netherlands	
3	23 June	(United States) Ogden	United States	Canada	Mexico	

==== Women's team ====
Stage	Date	Location	1st place, gold medalist(s)	2nd place, silver medalist(s)	3rd place, bronze medalist(s)	Ref.
1	15 April	(China) Shanghai	United States	Russia	Italy	
2	6 May	(Turkey) Antalya	United States	Italy	Germany	
3	23 June	(United States) Ogden	Russia	United States	Venezuela	

==== Mixed team ====
Stage	Date	Location	1st place, gold medalist(s)	2nd place, silver medalist(s)	3rd place, bronze medalist(s)	Ref.
1	15 April	(China) Shanghai	France	United States	United Kingdom	
2	6 May	(Turkey) Antalya	United States	Italy	United Kingdom	
3	23 June	(United States) Ogden	Russia	Netherlands	Germany	
Final	22 September	(Japan) Tokyo	United States	Japan	—N/a	

== Medals table ==
Rank	Nation	Gold	Silver	Bronze	Total
1	United States	18	7	3	28
2	South Korea	7	1	4	12
3	Russia	5	3	0	8
4	India	1	4	0	5
5	Italy	1	3	2	6
6	France	1	2	5	8
7	Mexico	1	2	4	7
8	Great Britain	1	2	3	6
9	Chinese Taipei	1	1	1	3
10	Japan	0	3	0	3
11	Netherlands	0	2	1	3
11	Ukraine	0	2	1	3
13	Germany	0	1	4	5
14	China	0	1	3	4
15	Canada	0	1	0	1
15	Denmark	0	1	0	1
17	Venezuela	0	0	2	2
18	Malaysia	0	0	1	1
Totals (18 entries)		36	36	34	106

== Qualification ==
=== Recurve ===
==== Men's individual ====
Pos.	Name	Points	(China)	(Turkey)	(United States)	
1.	(South Korea) Im Dong-hyun	35	10	25	–	Q
2.	(Ukraine) Dmytro Hrachov	34	21	13	–	Q
3.	(United Kingdom) Larry Godfrey	26	–	5	21	Q
4.	(United States) Brady Ellison	25	25	–	–	Q
4.	(Mexico) Luis Álvarez	25	–	–	25	Q
6.	(France) Gaël Prévost	23	–	5	18	Q
6.	(South Korea) Kim Woo-jin	23	5	18	–	Q
8.	(Ukraine) Markiyan Ivashko	21	–	21	–	
9.	(India) Tarundeep Rai	20	5	–	15	
9.	(South Korea) Kim Bub-min	20	5	15	–	

==== Women's individual ====
Pos.	Name	Points	(China)	(Turkey)	(United States)	
1.	(India) Deepika Kumari	35	10	25	–	Q
2.	(South Korea) Ki Bo-bae	30	25	5	–	Q
2.	(South Korea) Choi Hyeon-ju	30	18	12	–	Q
4.	(South Korea) Lee Sung-jin	26	5	21	–	^{1}
5.	(Russia) Kristina Timofeeva	25	–	–	25	Q
6.	(United States) Jennifer Nichols	21	–	–	21	Q
6.	(China) Fang Yuting	21	21	–	–	^{2}
8.	(China) Xu Jing	20	5	15	–	^{2}
9.	(Mexico) Alejandra Valencia	18	–	–	18	Q
9.	(South Korea) Chang Hye-jin	18	13	5	–	^{1}
9.	(Chinese Taipei) Lin Chia-en	18	–	18	–	Q

^{1.} Could not qualify as national quota already reached
^{2.} Qualified but withdrew

==== Mixed team ====
Pos.	Team	Points	(China)	(Turkey)	(United States)	
1.	United States	24	8	–	16	Q
2.	Japan	20	12	–	8	Q^{1}
3.	Chinese Taipei	16	16	–	–	
3.	South Korea	16	–	16	–	
3.	Italy	16	4	12	–	

^{1.} Qualified for final as host

=== Compound ===
==== Men's individual ====
Pos.	Name	Points	(China)	(Turkey)	(United States)	
1.	(United States) Reo Wilde	75	25	25	25	Q
2.	(United States) Braden Gellenthien	47	13	21	13	Q
3.	(France) Dominique Genet	41	18	18	5	Q
4.	(France) Pierre-Julien Deloche	38	15	5	18	Q
5.	(Netherlands) Peter Elzinga	32	11	–	21	Q
6.	(Mexico) Julio Ricardo Fierro	31	21	5	5	Q
7.	(Germany) Paul Titscher	25	10	–	15	Q
8.	(United States) Dave Cousins	23	13	5	5	
9.	(Iran) Reza Zamaninejad	18	5	–	13	
10.	(Denmark) Martin Damsbo	15	5	–	10	

==== Women's individual ====
Pos.	Name	Points	(China)	(Turkey)	(United States)	
1.	(Russia) Albina Loginova	58	21	25	12	Q
2.	(Italy) Marcella Tonioli	43	25	18	–	Q
3.	(United States) Christie Colin	40	10	5	25	Q
4.	(Germany) Kristina Berger	39	–	21	18	Q
5.	(United States) Jamie van Natta	36	–	15	21	Q
6.	(United States) Erika Anschutz	26	13	–	13	^{1}
7.	(Italy) Laura Longo	25	5	5	15	Q
8.	(United States) Diane Watson	23	18	–	5	^{1}
8.	(Venezuela) Olga Bosch	23	12	–	11	^{2}
10.	(United Kingdom) Danielle Brown	20	15	–	5	Q

^{1.} Could not qualify as national quota already reached
^{2.} Qualified but withdrew

==== Mixed team ====
Pos.	Team	Points	(China)	(Turkey)	(United States)	
1.	United States	32	12	16	4	Q
2.	United Kingdom	20	10	10	–	
3.	France	19	16	3	–	
4.	Germany	18	–	8	10	
5.	Russia	16	–	–	16	
5.	Mexico	16	8	–	8	

=== Nations ranking ===
Pos.	Nation	Points	(China)	(Turkey)	(United States)
1.	United States	741	277	167	297
2.	South Korea	319	136	183	–
3.	Russia	284	58	60	166
4.	Italy	280	107	104	69
5.	France	266	143	74	49
6.	Mexico	229	34	51	144
7.	India	214	89	78	47
8.	Germany	159	10	81	68
9.	United Kingdom	158	25	69	64
10.	China	138	87	51	–

== World Cup Final ==
=== Recurve ===
==== Men's individual ====
Quarterfinals
1	(South Korea) Im Dong-hyun	2	2	2
8	(Japan) Takaharu Furukawa	0	0	0
5	(Mexico) Luis Álvarez	0	0	0
4	(United States) Brady Ellison	2	2	2
3	(United Kingdom) Larry Godfrey	0	1	0	1
6	(South Korea) Kim Woo-jin	2	1	2	1
7	(France) Gaël Prévost	2	1	2	2
2	(Ukraine) Dmytro Hrachov	0	1	0	0

Semifinals
1	(South Korea) Im Dong-hyun	0	2	0	0
4	(United States) Brady Ellison	2	0	2	2
6	(South Korea) Kim Woo-jin	2	1	2	0	0^{9*}
7	(France) Gaël Prévost	0	1	0	2	2^{9}

Finals
4	(United States) Brady Ellison	1	1	1	0	2^{8}
6	(South Korea) Kim Woo-jin	1	1	1	2	0^{8*}
Third place
1	(South Korea) Im Dong-hyun	0	2	0	0
7	(France) Gaël Prévost	2	0	2	2

==== Women's individual ====
Quarterfinals
1	(India) Deepika Kumari	2	1	2	2
8	(Japan) Miki Kanie	0	1	0	0
5	(United States) Jennifer Nichols	1	2	0	1	2
4	(Russia) Kristina Timofeeva	1	0	2	1	0
3	(South Korea) Choi Hyeon-ju	1	1	0	2	2
6	(Mexico) Alejandra Valencia	1	1	2	0	0
7	(Chinese Taipei) Lin Chia-en	2	0	0	0
2	(South Korea) Ki Bo-bae	0	2	2	2

Semifinals
1	(India) Deepika Kumari	2	0	2	2
5	(United States) Jennifer Nichols	0	2	0	0
3	(South Korea) Choi Hyeon-ju	0	0	2	1	2^{9}
2	(South Korea) Ki Bo-bae	2	2	0	1	0^{10}

Finals
1	(India) Deepika Kumari	2	2	0	0	0
2	(South Korea) Ki Bo-bae	0	0	2	2	2
Third place
5	(United States) Jennifer Nichols	0	0	2	1	1
3	(South Korea) Choi Hyeon-ju	2	2	0	1	1

==== Mixed team ====
Finals
1	United States; Jennifer Nichols; Brady Ellison	143
2	Japan; Miki Kanie; Takaharu Furukawa	127

=== Compound ===
==== Men's individual ====
Quarterfinals
1	(United States) Reo Wilde	145
8	(Japan) Naoto Anji	136
5	(Netherlands) Peter Elzinga	143
4	(France) Pierre-Julien Deloche	142
3	(France) Dominique Genet	141
6	(Mexico) Julio Ricardo Fierro	144
7	(Germany) Paul Titscher	143
2	(United States) Braden Gellenthien	145

Semifinals
1	(United States) Reo Wilde	149
5	(Netherlands) Peter Elzinga	145
6	(Mexico) Julio Ricardo Fierro	144
2	(United States) Braden Gellenthien	147

Finals
1	(United States) Reo Wilde	147
2	(United States) Braden Gellenthien	148
Third place
6	(Netherlands) Peter Elzinga	146
5	(Mexico) Julio Ricardo Fierro	148

==== Women's individual ====
Quarterfinals
1	(Russia) Albina Loginova	138
8	(Japan) Yumiko Honda	142
5	(United States) Jamie van Natta	142^{10*}
4	(Germany) Kristina Berger	142^{10}
3	(United States) Christie Colin	144
6	(Italy) Laura Longo	143
7	(United Kingdom) Danielle Brown	142
2	(Italy) Marcella Tonioli	136

Semifinals
8	(Japan) Yumiko Honda	140
5	(United States) Jamie van Natta	142
3	(United States) Christie Colin	136
7	(United Kingdom) Danielle Brown	140

Finals
5	(United States) Jamie van Natta	140
7	(United Kingdom) Danielle Brown	139
Third place
8	(Japan) Yumiko Honda	135
3	(United States) Christie Colin	140

==== Mixed team ====
Finals
1	United States; Christie Colin; Reo Wilde	154
2	Japan; Yumiko Honda; Naoto Anji	147
