= 2011 World Archery Championships – Recurve mixed team =

The mixed team recurve competition at the 2011 World Archery Championships took place on 4–10 July 2011 in Turin, Italy. 56 teams of two archers competed in the qualification round on 4–5 July; the top 16 teams qualified for the knockout tournament on 6 July, with the semi-finals and finals on 10 July. The tournament doubled as the principal qualification tournament for the 2012 Olympics.

Top seeds Im Dong-hyun and Ki Bo-bae won the competition for Korea, defeating Mexico in the final.

== Seeds ==
Seedings were based on the combined total of the team members' qualification scores in the individual ranking rounds. The top 16 teams were assigned places in the draw depending on their overall ranking.

1. (South Korea) Im Dong-hyun / Ki Bo-bae (champions)
2. (Chinese Taipei) Kuo Cheng-wei / Le Chien-ying (quarterfinal)
3. (United States) Brady Ellison / Miranda Leek (1st round)
4. (Italy) Mauro Nespoli / Natalia Valeeva (1st round)
5. (India) Jayanta Talukdar / Deepika Kumari (quarterfinal)
6. (China) Chen Wenyuan / Fang Yuting (1st round)
7. (United Kingdom) Larry Godfrey / Amy Oliver (3rd place)
8. (Japan) Takaharu Furukawa / Ren Hayakawa (quarterfinal)
9. (France) Romain Girouille / Bérengère Schuh (1st round)
10. (Mongolia) Jantsan Gantugs / Bishindee Urantungalag (1st round)
11. (Mexico) Juan René Serrano / Aída Román (2nd place)
12. (Ukraine) Viktor Ruban / Victoriya Koval (1st round)
13. (Poland) Jacek Proć / Justyna Mospinek (4th place)
14. (Russia) Alexander Kozhin / Natalya Erdyniyeva (quarterfinal)
15. (North Korea) Jon Chol / Kwon Un-sil (1st round)
16. (Denmark) Johan Weiss / Carina Christiansen (1st round)

== Draw ==
1st round
1	South Korea	149
16	Denmark	143
9	France	149
8	Japan	151
5	India	144
12	Ukraine	142
13	Poland	147
4	Italy	146
3	United States	145
14	Russia	147
11	Mexico	149
6	China	148
7	United Kingdom	148
10	Mongolia	142
15	North Korea	145
2	Chinese Taipei	147

Quarterfinals
1	South Korea	151
8	Japan	143
5	India	148
13	Poland	150
14	Russia	146
11	Mexico	147
7	United Kingdom	146
2	Chinese Taipei	145

Semifinals
1	South Korea	151
13	Poland	147
11	Mexico	145
7	United Kingdom	140

Finals
1	South Korea	151
11	Mexico	144
Third place
13	Poland	139
7	United Kingdom	147
