= 2012 World Indoor Archery Championships =

International archery competition

2012 World Indoor Target Archery Championships
- Venue: South Point Hotel
- Location: Enterprise, Nevada, United States
- Start date: 2012-02-05
- End date: 2012-02-09
- Competitors: 269 from 36 nations

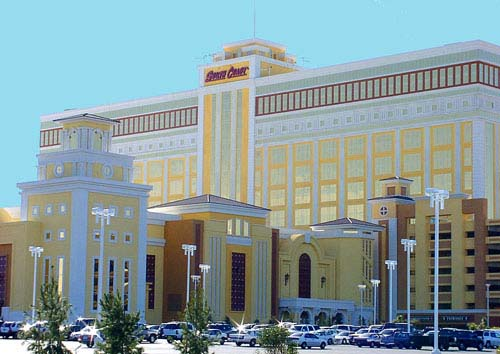
South Point Hotel, competition venue.

The 2012 World Indoor Target Archery Championships was the 11th edition of the World Indoor Archery Championships. The event was held in Las Vegas, United States from February 5 to February 9, 2012 and was organized by International Archery Federation (FITA). The event was contested at the South Point Hotel, and the event was followed by the World Archery Festival and the finals of the second Indoor Archery World Cup.

== Events ==
=== Recurve ===
==== Senior ====
Event	Gold	Silver	Bronze
Men's individual	Marco Galiazzo; Italy	Jake Kaminski; United States	Brady Ellison; United States
Men's team	United States; Brady Ellison; Jake Kaminski; Victor Wunderle	Russia; Bair Badenov; Alexey Borodin; Baljinima Tsyrempilov	Ukraine; Yuriy Havelko; Yaroslav Mokrynsky; Viktor Ruban
Women's individual	Natalia Valeeva; Italy	Miranda Leek; United States	Ksenia Perova; Russia
Women's team	United States; Brandi Deloach; Miranda Leek; Jennifer Nichols	Japan; Miki Kanie; Mitsui Nagaoka; Mai Okubo	Italy; Guendalina Sartori; Elena Tonetta; Natalia Valeeva

==== Junior ====
Event	Gold	Silver	Bronze
Men's individual	Luca Maran; Italy	Sjef van den Berg; Netherlands	Vitaliy Komonyuk; Ukraine
Men's team	Russia; Artysh Chuldum; Bair Tsybekdorzhiev; Beligto Tsynguev	Ukraine; Heorhiy Ivanytskyy; Vitaliy Komonyuk; Valentyn Kutsyy	United States; Jeremiah Cusick; Daniel McLaughlin; Sean McLaughin
Women's individual	Kristina Timofeeva; Russia	Anastasia Pavlova; Ukraine	Polina Rodionova; Ukraine
Women's team	Ukraine; Veronika Marchenko; Anastasia Pavlova; Polina Rodionova	Russia; Oyuna Bolotova; Tuyana Dashidorzhieva; Kristina Timofeeva	United States; Sarah Bernstein; Ariel Gibilaro; LaNola Pritchard

=== Compound ===
==== Senior ====
Event	Gold	Silver	Bronze
Men's individual	Reo Wilde; United States	Jimmy Butts; United States	Julio Ricardo Fierro; Mexico
Men's team	United States; Jimmy Butts; Braden Gellenthien; Reo Wilde	France; Pierre Julien Deloche; Sebastien Peineau; Guillaume Rubben	Great Britain; Duncan Busby; Liam Grimwood; Chris White
Women's individual	Viktoria Balzhanova; Russia	Inge van Caspel; Netherlands	Linda Ochoa; Mexico
Women's team	United States; Erika Anschutz; Christie Colin; Tristan Skarvan	Russia; Natalia Avdeeva; Viktoria Balzhanova; Albina Loginova	Great Britain; Andrea Gales; Naomi Jones; Nichola Simpson

==== Junior ====
Event	Gold	Silver	Bronze
Men's individual	Bridger Deaton; United States	Rheinhard Louw; South Africa	Garrett Abernethy; United States
Men's team	United States; Garrett Abernethy; Ben Cleland; Bridger Deaton	Mexico; Rodrigo Cardenas Osnorno; Mario Cardoso; David Montiel	South Africa; Rheinhard Louw; Patrick O'Neill; James Scoones
Women's individual	Runa Grydeland; Norway	Lexi Keller; United States	Contessa Loh; Singapore
Women's team	Russia; Ekaterina Korobeynikova; Radmila Protasova; Maria Vinogradova	United States; Carli Cochran; Lexi Keller; Sarah Lance	Croatia; Tamara Brlek; Maja Orlic; Dora Ostrek

=== Medal table ===
Rank	Nation	Gold	Silver	Bronze	Total
1	United States (USA)	7	5	4	16
2	Russia (RUS)	4	3	1	8
3	Italy (ITA)	3	0	1	4
4	Ukraine (UKR)	1	2	3	6
5	Norway (NOR)	1	0	0	1
6	Netherlands (NED)	0	2	0	2
7	Mexico (MEX)	0	1	2	3
8	South Africa (RSA)	0	1	1	2
9	France (FRA)	0	1	0	1
9	Japan (JPN)	0	1	0	1
11	Great Britain (GBR)	0	0	2	2
12	Croatia (CRO)	0	0	1	1
12	Singapore (SIN)	0	0	1	1
Totals (13 entries)		16	16	16	48

== Participating nations ==
36 nations registered 269 athletes across disciplines, one fewer country and 69 athletes fewer than in Rzeszów in 2009.

- Australia (8)
- Austria (4)
- Belgium (3)
- Bulgaria (2)
- Canada (18)
- Croatia (6)
- Czech Republic (2)
- Denmark (11)
- El Salvador (1)
- Finland (6)
- France (9)
- Georgia (3)
- Germany (4)
- Great Britain (8)
- Guatemala (1)
- Iran (1)
- Ireland (4)
- Italy (19)
- Japan (7)
- Mexico (24)
- Moldova (2)
- Netherlands (9)
- New Zealand (2)
- Norway (9)
- Russia (23)
- Singapore (2)
- Slovakia (2)
- Slovenia (4)
- South Africa (11)
- Sri Lanka (1)
- Sweden (5)
- Switzerland (6)
- Turkey (9)
- Ukraine (17)
- United States (24)
- Venezuela (2)
