= 2011 World Archery Championships =

- Venue: Piazza Castello; Palazzina di caccia of Stupinigi
- Location: Turin, Italy
- Start date: 2 July
- End date: 10 July
- Competitors: 562 from 84 nations

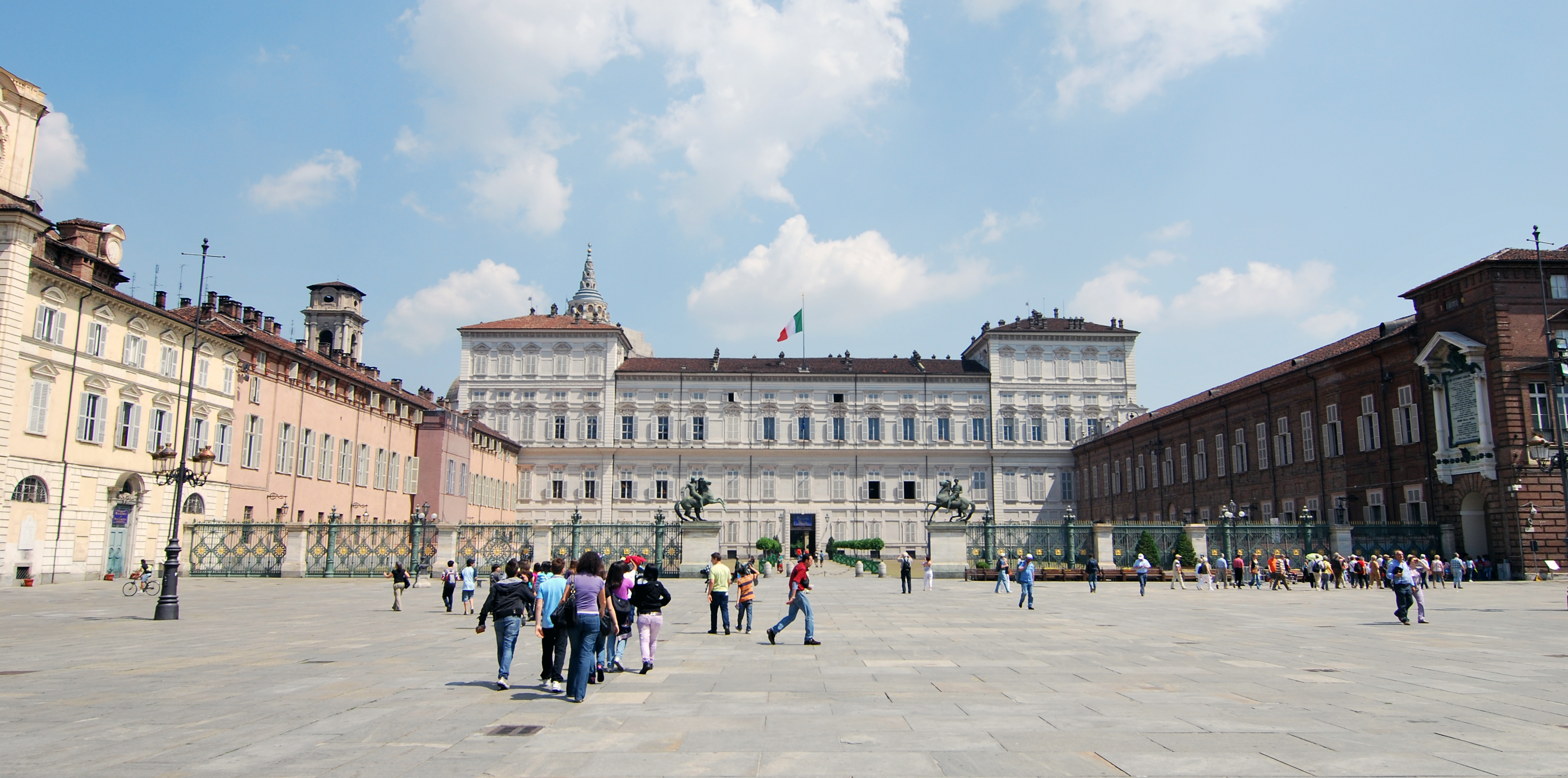
Piazza Castello, host of the finals.

The 2011 World Archery Championships was the 46th edition of the event. It was held in Turin, Italy on 2–10 July 2011 and was organized by International Archery Federation (FITA). The event was contested in two different areas. The preliminary rounds were held at the Palazzina di caccia of Stupinigi in Nichelino (10km south-west of Turin) and the finals were held at the Piazza Castello in Turin.

The top eight teams in the recurve competition for men and women qualified for the 2012 Summer Olympics, as eight athletes from NOC's not already qualified qualified quotas for their countries.

== Medals table ==
* Host nation (Italy)

Rank	Nation	Gold	Silver	Bronze	Total
1	South Korea	3	1	2	6
2	United States	2	1	3	6
3	Italy*	2	0	1	3
4	Canada	1	0	1	2
5	Chile	1	0	0	1
5	Russia	1	0	0	1
7	France	0	2	0	2
8	Denmark	0	1	0	1
8	Georgia	0	1	0	1
8	India	0	1	0	1
8	Iran	0	1	0	1
8	Mexico	0	1	0	1
8	Netherlands	0	1	0	1
14	China	0	0	1	1
14	Great Britain	0	0	1	1
14	Venezuela	0	0	1	1
Totals (16 entries)		10	10	10	30

== Medals summary ==
=== Recurve ===
Event	Gold	Silver	Bronze
Men's individual	Kim Woo-jin; South Korea	Oh Jin-hyek; South Korea	Brady Ellison; United States
Women's individual	Denisse van Lamoen; Chile	Kristine Esebua; Georgia	Fang Yuting; China
Men's team	South Korea; Oh Jin-hyek; Kim Woo-jin; Im Dong-hyun	France; Gaël Prévost; Jean-Charles Valladont; Romain Girouille	Italy; Michele Frangilli; Marco Galiazzo; Mauro Nespoli
Women's team	Italy; Natalia Valeeva; Guendalina Sartori; Jessica Tomasi	India; Deepika Kumari; Bombayla Devi Laishram; Chekrovolü Swüro	South Korea; Han Gyeong-hee; Jung Dasomi; Ki Bo-bae
Mixed team	South Korea; Im Dong-hyun; Ki Bo-bae	Mexico; Juan René Serrano; Aída Román	United Kingdom; Laurence Godfrey; Amy Oliver

=== Compound ===
Event	Gold	Silver	Bronze
Men's individual	Christopher Perkins; Canada	Jesse Broadwater; United States	Reo Wilde; United States
Women's individual	Albina Loginova; Russia	Pascale Lebecque; France	Erika Anschutz; United States
Men's team	United States; Jesse Broadwater; Braden Gellenthien; Reo Wilde	Denmark; Martin Damsbo; Torben Johannessen; Patrick Laursen	Canada; Christopher Perkins; Simon Rousseau; Dietmar Trillus
Women's team	United States; Erika Anschutz; Christie Colin; Jamie Van Natta	Iran; Vida Halimian; Mahtab Parsamehr; Shabnam Sarlak	Venezuela; Olga Bosh; Luzmary Guédez; Ana Mendoza
Mixed team	Italy; Sergio Pagni; Marcella Tonioli	Netherlands; Peter Elzinga; Inge van Caspel	South Korea; Choi Yong-hee; Seok Ji-hyun

== Participating nations ==
At the close of preliminary registrations, 87 nations registered a record number of athletes.

- Algeria (2)
- Armenia (5)
- Australia (7)
- Austria (6)
- Azerbaijan (3)
- Bangladesh (9)
- Belgium (9)
- Belarus (6)
- Brazil (9)
- Bulgaria (4)
- Canada (12)
- Chile (5)
- China (6)
- Ivory Coast (3)
- Colombia (11)
- Croatia (5)
- Cuba (3)
- Cyprus (6)
- Czech Republic (9)
- Denmark (10)
- Dominican Republic (1)
- Ecuador (10)
- Egypt (6)
- El Salvador (6)
- Estonia (12)
- Finland (12)
- France (12)
- Georgia (6)
- Germany (12)
- Greece (10)
- Guatemala (7)
- Hong Kong (1)
- Hungary (8)
- India (12)
- Indonesia (12)
- Iran (12)
- Iraq (6)
- Ireland (11)
- Israel (3)
- Italy (12)
- Japan (8)
- Kazakhstan (8)
- Kuwait (2)
- Latvia (7)
- Lithuania (8)
- Luxembourg (6)
- Malaysia (6)
- Mauritius (6)
- Mexico (12)
- Moldova (4)
- Mongolia (7)
- Montenegro (1)
- Morocco (6)
- Myanmar (4)
- Nepal (3)
- Netherlands (12)
- New Zealand (8)
- Norway (8)
- Philippines (6)
- Poland (7)
- Portugal (3)
- North Korea (6)
- Puerto Rico (6)
- Qatar (7)
- Romania (9)
- Russia (12)
- San Marino (6)
- Saudi Arabia (4)
- Serbia (6)
- Singapore (11)
- Slovakia (12)
- Slovenia (7)
- South Africa (11)
- South Korea (12)
- Spain (12)
- Sri Lanka (6)
- Sweden (12)
- Switzerland (8)
- Tajikistan (4)
- Thailand (8)
- Turkey (10)
- Uganda (6)
- Ukraine (6)
- United Kingdom (12)
- United States (12)
- Venezuela (12)
