= Indoor archery at the 2009 Asian Indoor Games =

- Venue: Hải Phòng Youth Gymnasium
- Dates: 3–6 November 2009

Indoor archery was contested at the 2009 Asian Indoor Games in Hải Phòng, Vietnam from 3 November to 6 November 2009. The competition took place at Hải Phòng Youth Gymnasium.

== Medalists ==
=== Recurve ===
Event	Gold	Silver	Bronze
Men's individual	Kim Myeong-su; South Korea	Kim Woo-jin; South Korea	Majid Mirrahimi; Iran
Men's team	South Korea; Sung Woo-kyeong; Choi Gun-tae; Kim Woo-jin	China; Zhao Shenzou; Wang Zhide; Zhang Jianpeng	Iran; Majid Mirrahimi; Keivan Riazimehr; Nader Manouchehri
Women's individual	An Se-jin; South Korea	Bishindeegiin Urantungalag; Mongolia	Yu Jang-mi; South Korea
Women's team	South Korea; Yu Jang-mi; Shim Mi-so; Jung Dasomi	China; Lu Siyi; Qi Na; Li Xiaomu	Iran; Najmeh Abtin; Yasaman Shirian; Farnoush Shaghaghi

=== Compound ===
Event	Gold	Silver	Bronze
Men's individual	Reza Zamaninejad; Iran	Nguyễn Tiến Cương; Vietnam	Mansour Kordi; Iran
Men's team	Iran; Reza Zamaninejad; Abdollah Kiaei; Mohammad Ali Karimi	Thailand; Pramuk Suwannapatip; Chakrit Thongwattana; Jitti Kaenthonglang	Vietnam; Nguyễn Tiến Cương; Vũ Việt Anh; Nguyễn Thanh Tuấn
Women's individual	Narisara Tinbua; Thailand	Mahtab Parsamehr; Iran	Trần Nguyễn Tiểu Anh; Vietnam
Women's team	Iran; Mahtab Parsamehr; Ensieh Haji Anzehaei; Akram Shabani	Thailand; Sunee Detchokul; Chuanpit Samranruen; Narisara Tinbua	India; Bheigyabati Chanu; Sakro Besra; Vrushali Gorle

== Medal table ==
Rank	Nation	Gold	Silver	Bronze	Total
1	South Korea (KOR)	4	1	1	6
2	Iran (IRI)	3	1	4	8
3	Thailand (THA)	1	2	0	3
4	China (CHN)	0	2	0	2
5	Vietnam (VIE)	0	1	2	3
6	Mongolia (MGL)	0	1	0	1
7	India (IND)	0	0	1	1
Totals (7 entries)		8	8	8	24

== Results ==
=== Recurve ===
==== Men's individual ====
===== Elimination =====
3 November

Rank	Athlete	Score	10s	9s
1	Choi Gun-tae (KOR)	595	55	5
2	Kim Woo-jin (KOR)	593	53	7
3	Sung Woo-kyeong (KOR)	592	52	8
4	Kim Myeong-su (KOR)	585	46	13
4	Wang Zhide (CHN)	585	46	13
6	Majid Mirrahimi (IRI)	582	43	16
7	Keivan Riazimehr (IRI)	581	43	15
8	Zhao Shenzou (CHN)	579	39	21
9	Rajib Basumatary (IND)	577	40	17
10	Witthaya Thamwong (THA)	577	37	23
11	Khomkrit Duangsuwan (THA)	576	39	18
12	Gurucharan Besra (IND)	575	37	21
12	Nader Manouchehri (IRI)	575	37	21
12	Nanavath Ravinder (IND)	575	37	21
15	Vũ Văn Dũng (VIE)	574	38	20
16	Denchai Thepna (THA)	573	36	21
17	Waikhom Ranjan Singh (IND)	571	32	27
18	Đào Trọng Kiên (VIE)	570	34	22
19	Hendro Suprianto (INA)	570	33	24
20	Akbar Bastan (IRI)	567	32	23
21	Rahmat Sulistyawan (INA)	566	33	21
22	Prawit Poljungleed (THA)	565	30	25
23	Zhang Jianpeng (CHN)	563	35	13
24	Jiang Hao (CHN)	563	28	27
25	Jantsangiin Gantögs (MGL)	561	29	23
26	Jit Bahadur Muktan (NEP)	560	25	30
27	Prem Prasad Pun (NEP)	553	28	20
28	Ashim Sherchan (NEP)	551	21	31
29	Ali Ahmed Salem (QAT)	550	21	29
30	Hoàng Ngọc Nhật (VIE)	548	26	25
31	Nguyễn Bá Hải (VIE)	548	24	26
32	Baasanjavyn Dolgorsüren (MGL)	547	21	29
33	Mohammad Ali Sofian (INA)	545	20	26
34	Ramesh Bhattachan (NEP)	542	15	33
35	Mohammed Al-Abdulmuhsin (KSA)	535	21	21
35	Israf Khan (QAT)	535	21	21
37	Yundendorjiin Ganzorig (MGL)	533	15	30
38	Jigme Dukpa (BHU)	532	16	31
39	Turki Al-Derbi (KSA)	531	18	21
40	Baatarjavyn Zolboo (MGL)	528	15	18
41	Khadher Monser (QAT)	518	17	21
42	Sami Al-Bawardi (KSA)	494	7	27
43	Salem Ahmed (UAE)	194	1	4
44	Ali Ahmed (UAE)	191	2	4
45	Mohamed Khameis (UAE)	79	0	0

===== Knockout round =====
1/16 finals – 3 November
Prem Prasad Pun (NEP)	116–104	Jit Bahadur Muktan (NEP)
Khomkrit Duangsuwan (THA)	118–21	Salem Ahmed (UAE)
Ali Ahmed (UAE)	59–116	Witthaya Thamwong (THA)
Israf Khan (QAT)	103–116	Đào Trọng Kiên (VIE)
Hendro Suprianto (INA)	111–109	Mohammed Al-Abdulmuhsin (KSA)
Baasanjavyn Dolgorsüren (MGL)	113–115	Rahmat Sulistyawan (INA)
Vũ Văn Dũng (VIE)	113–98	Jigme Dukpa (BHU)
Turki Al-Derbi (KSA)	106–116	Gurucharan Besra (IND)
Jantsangiin Gantögs (MGL)	112–107	Ali Ahmed Salem (QAT)

1/8 finals 4 November
Kim Woo-jin (KOR)	117
Prem Prasad Pun (NEP)	112
Khomkrit Duangsuwan (THA)	117
Witthaya Thamwong (THA)	113
Keivan Riazimehr (IRI)	112
Đào Trọng Kiên (VIE)	109
Hendro Suprianto (INA)	113
Majid Mirrahimi (IRI)	118
Wang Zhide (CHN)	115
Rahmat Sulistyawan (INA)	116
Vũ Văn Dũng (VIE)	112
Zhao Shenzou (CHN)	118
Rajib Basumatary (IND)	113
Gurucharan Besra (IND)	116
Jantsangiin Gantögs (MGL)	114
Kim Myeong-su (KOR)	115

Quarterfinals; 4 November
Kim Woo-jin (KOR)	116
Khomkrit Duangsuwan (THA)	111
Keivan Riazimehr (IRI)	115
Majid Mirrahimi (IRI)	117
Rahmat Sulistyawan (INA)	115
Zhao Shenzou (CHN)	114
Gurucharan Besra (IND)	113
Kim Myeong-su (KOR)	116

Semifinals; 5 November
Kim Woo-jin (KOR)	116
Majid Mirrahimi (IRI)	112
Rahmat Sulistyawan (INA)	109
Kim Myeong-su (KOR)	117

Final; 5 November
Kim Woo-jin (KOR)	118^{29}
Kim Myeong-su (KOR)	118^{30}
Bronze medal match
Majid Mirrahimi (IRI)	113
Rahmat Sulistyawan (INA)	110

==== Men's team ====
===== Elimination =====
3 November

Rank	Team	Score	10s	9s
1	South Korea (KOR)	1780	160	20
2	Iran (IRI)	1738	123	52
3	China (CHN)	1727	120	47
4	India (IND)	1727	114	59
5	Thailand (THA)	1726	112	62
6	Vietnam (VIE)	1692	98	67
7	Indonesia (INA)	1681	86	71
8	Nepal (NEP)	1664	74	81
9	Mongolia (MGL)	1641	65	82
10	Qatar (QAT)	1603	59	71
11	Saudi Arabia (KSA)	1560	46	69
12	United Arab Emirates (UAE)	464	3	8

===== Knockout round =====
6 November

1/8 finals
Mongolia	224
Nepal	217
Thailand	228
United Arab Emirates	56
Saudi Arabia	212
Vietnam	216
Indonesia	213
Qatar	208

Quarterfinals
South Korea	234
Mongolia	223
Thailand	223
India	228
China	225^{30}
Vietnam	225^{28}
Indonesia	223
Iran	233

Semifinals
South Korea	235
India	229
China	231
Iran	228

Final
South Korea	233
China	223
Bronze medal match
India	230^{28}
Iran	230^{29}

==== Women's individual ====
===== Elimination =====
3 November

Rank	Athlete	Score	10s	9s
1	Yu Jang-mi (KOR)	587	47	13
2	Lu Siyi (CHN)	583	43	17
3	An Se-jin (KOR)	582	42	18
3	Shim Mi-so (KOR)	582	42	18
5	Jung Dasomi (KOR)	581	41	19
6	Bishindeegiin Urantungalag (MGL)	570	32	26
7	Li Xiaomu (CHN)	568	33	22
8	Qi Na (CHN)	568	31	26
9	Punya Prabha (IND)	566	31	24
10	Yasaman Shirian (IRI)	563	29	25
11	Pattheera Boonnark (THA)	556	26	25
12	Nguyễn Thị Kiều Trang (VIE)	555	28	20
13	Farnoush Shaghaghi (IRI)	552	24	26
14	Chutinan Sakulchai (THA)	550	26	22
15	Fang Yuting (CHN)	546	25	25
16	Chuluunbaataryn Mönkhtsetseg (MGL)	546	22	25
17	Sherab Zam (BHU)	545	24	27
18	Rina Dewi Puspitasari (INA)	545	16	35
19	Nguyễn Thị Hương (VIE)	543	24	25
20	Najmeh Abtin (IRI)	543	21	23
21	Nguyễn Trà My (VIE)	542	21	24
22	Zahra Dehghan (IRI)	527	17	20
23	Sirilak Suksamorn (THA)	527	15	28
24	Jittiyaporn Chaiwan (THA)	523	14	28
25	Aya Kwan (HKG)	503	10	27
26	Nguyễn Phương Linh (VIE)	493	11	20
27	Chuluuny Oyunsüren (MGL)	485	11	16

===== Knockout round =====
1/8 finals 4 November
Yu Jang-mi (KOR)	113
Aya Kwan (HKG)	100
Nguyễn Thị Kiều Trang (VIE)	112
Pattheera Boonnark (THA)	114
Li Xiaomu (CHN)	113
Chuluunbaataryn Mönkhtsetseg (MGL)	109
Sherab Zam (BHU)	109
Bishindeegiin Urantungalag (MGL)	112
An Se-jin (KOR)	117
Rina Dewi Puspitasari (INA)	107
Chutinan Sakulchai (THA)	110
Punya Prabha (IND)	116
Yasaman Shirian (IRI)	112
Farnoush Shaghaghi (IRI)	109
Nguyễn Thị Hương (VIE)	109
Lu Siyi (CHN)	115

Quarterfinals; 4 November
Yu Jang-mi (KOR)	117
Pattheera Boonnark (THA)	107
Li Xiaomu (CHN)	112
Bishindeegiin Urantungalag (MGL)	114
An Se-jin (KOR)	115
Punya Prabha (IND)	112
Yasaman Shirian (IRI)	116
Lu Siyi (CHN)	114

Semifinals; 5 November
Yu Jang-mi (KOR)	111
Bishindeegiin Urantungalag (MGL)	113
An Se-jin (KOR)	116
Yasaman Shirian (IRI)	114

Final; 5 November
Bishindeegiin Urantungalag (MGL)	111
An Se-jin (KOR)	114
Bronze medal match
Yu Jang-mi (KOR)	116
Yasaman Shirian (IRI)	107

==== Women's team ====
===== Elimination =====
3 November

Rank	Team	Score	10s	9s
1	South Korea (KOR)	1750	130	50
2	China (CHN)	1719	107	65
3	Iran (IRI)	1658	74	74
4	Vietnam (VIE)	1640	73	69
5	Thailand (THA)	1633	67	75
6	Mongolia (MGL)	1601	65	67

===== Knockout round =====
6 November

Quarterfinals
Thailand	217
Vietnam	228
Iran	219
Mongolia	210

Semifinals
South Korea	233
Vietnam	219
Iran	221
China	229

Final
South Korea	234
China	232
Bronze medal match
Vietnam	221
Iran	230

=== Compound ===
==== Men's individual ====
===== Elimination =====
3 November

Rank	Athlete	Score	10s	9s
1	Reza Zamaninejad (IRI)	585	45	15
2	Mansour Kordi (IRI)	580	41	18
3	Nguyễn Tiến Cương (VIE)	580	40	20
4	Maisnam Chinglensana (IND)	575	36	23
5	Chakrit Thongwattana (THA)	575	35	25
5	Abdollah Kiaei (IRI)	575	35	25
7	Pramuk Suwannapatip (THA)	572	32	38
8	Abhishek Verma (IND)	571	31	29
9	Jitti Kaenthonglang (THA)	569	31	27
10	Haridas Singh (IND)	569	29	31
11	Nguyễn Thanh Tuấn (VIE)	567	28	31
12	Mohammad Ali Karimi (IRI)	566	26	34
13	Chan Pak Ki (HKG)	565	25	35
13	Vũ Việt Anh (VIE)	565	25	35
15	Jayantilal Nanoma (IND)	564	24	36
16	Khampho Inthavong (LAO)	562	30	28
17	Farhan Monser (QAT)	561	22	37
18	Thanonglith Siriphonh (LAO)	559	19	41
19	Nguyễn Chí Ba (VIE)	556	19	38
20	Pisit Sanunpanichakul (THA)	552	16	40
21	Ahmed Al-Abadi (QAT)	546	18	35
22	Phouvieng Mounthithay (LAO)	543	13	36
23	Abdullah Al-Tuwairgi (KSA)	537	8	43
24	Meshal Al-Otaibi (KSA)	500	6	31

===== Knockout round =====
1/8 finals 4 November
Chan Pak Ki (HKG)	110
Nguyễn Thanh Tuấn (VIE)	114
Chakrit Thongwattana (THA)	111^{28}
Thanonglith Siriphonh (LAO)	111^{27}
Ahmed Al-Abadi (QAT)	109
Maisnam Chinglensana (IND)	113
Nguyễn Tiến Cương (VIE)	116
Abdullah Al-Tuwairgi (KSA)	106
Farhan Monser (QAT)	111
Pramuk Suwannapatip (THA)	115
Abhishek Verma (IND)	114
Khampho Inthavong (LAO)	111
Meshal Al-Otaibi (KSA)	107
Mansour Kordi (IRI)	118

Quarterfinals; 4 November
Reza Zamaninejad (IRI)	118
Nguyễn Thanh Tuấn (VIE)	116
Chakrit Thongwattana (THA)	114
Maisnam Chinglensana (IND)	117
Nguyễn Tiến Cương (VIE)	118
Pramuk Suwannapatip (THA)	113
Abhishek Verma (IND)	113^{27}
Mansour Kordi (IRI)	113^{28}

Semifinals; 5 November
Reza Zamaninejad (IRI)	117
Maisnam Chinglensana (IND)	111
Nguyễn Tiến Cương (VIE)	114^{19}
Mansour Kordi (IRI)	114^{18}

Final; 5 November
Reza Zamaninejad (IRI)	118
Nguyễn Tiến Cương (VIE)	113
Bronze medal match
Maisnam Chinglensana (IND)	110
Mansour Kordi (IRI)	112

==== Men's team ====
===== Elimination =====
3 November

Rank	Team	Score	10s	9s
1	Iran (IRI)	1726	106	74
2	Thailand (THA)	1716	98	80
3	India (IND)	1715	96	83
4	Vietnam (VIE)	1703	93	86
5	Laos (LAO)	1664	62	105

===== Knockout round =====
6 November

Quarterfinals
Laos	220
Vietnam	223

Semifinals
Iran	228
Vietnam	223
India	224
Thailand	225

Final
Iran	228
Thailand	219
Bronze medal match
Vietnam	230
India	226

==== Women's individual ====
===== Elimination =====
3 November

Rank	Athlete	Score	10s	9s
1	Ensieh Haji Anzehaei (IRI)	570	30	30
2	Hoàng Thị Phương (VIE)	568	29	30
3	Sakro Besra (IND)	567	28	31
4	Trần Nguyễn Tiểu Anh (VIE)	566	27	32
5	Vrushali Gorle (IND)	563	24	35
6	Nguyễn Thị Xuân Hương (VIE)	560	25	31
7	Mahtab Parsamehr (IRI)	560	20	40
8	Akram Shabani (IRI)	559	21	37
9	Sweety Kumari (IND)	558	19	40
10	Sunee Detchokul (THA)	557	21	37
11	Narisara Tinbua (THA)	554	23	36
12	Bheigyabati Chanu (IND)	553	14	45
13	Phone Khamkeo (LAO)	549	11	47
14	Chuanpit Samranruen (THA)	546	10	48
15	Sakineh Ghasempour (IRI)	545	22	33
16	Chikmany Thonthanith (LAO)	539	14	33
17	Moncharee Harikul (THA)	532	12	38
18	Latda Vilayvanh (LAO)	532	9	39
19	Viengkeo Syhalath (LAO)	511	7	37
20	Lê Thị Huyền Thương (VIE)	496	2	32

===== Knockout round =====
1/8 finals 4 November
Phone Khamkeo (LAO)	108
Narisara Tinbua (THA)	115
Sunee Detchokul (THA)	115
Chikmany Thonthanith (LAO)	103

Quarterfinals; 4 November
Ensieh Haji Anzehaei (IRI)	113^{18}
Narisara Tinbua (THA)	113^{19}
Vrushali Gorle (IND)	113
Trần Nguyễn Tiểu Anh (VIE)	114
Sakro Besra (IND)	108
Mahtab Parsamehr (IRI)	117
Sunee Detchokul (THA)	110
Hoàng Thị Phương (VIE)	108

Semifinals; 5 November
Narisara Tinbua (THA)	116
Trần Nguyễn Tiểu Anh (VIE)	111
Mahtab Parsamehr (IRI)	112
Sunee Detchokul (THA)	111

Final; 5 November
Narisara Tinbua (THA)	113
Mahtab Parsamehr (IRI)	112
Bronze medal match
Trần Nguyễn Tiểu Anh (VIE)	111
Sunee Detchokul (THA)	110

==== Women's team ====
===== Elimination =====
3 November

Rank	Team	Score	10s	9s
1	Vietnam (VIE)	1694	81	93
2	Iran (IRI)	1689	71	107
3	India (IND)	1683	66	111
4	Thailand (THA)	1657	54	121
5	Laos (LAO)	1592	27	123

===== Knockout round =====
6 November

Quarterfinals
Laos	218
Thailand	227

Semifinals
Vietnam	224
Thailand	227
India	224
Iran	225

Final
Thailand	219
Iran	226
Bronze medal match
Vietnam	218
India	226
