= Polina Rodionova =

Ukrainian archer (born 1994)

Personal information
- Full name: Polina Serhiivna; Rodionova
- Born: 14 March 1994 (age 32) Sumy, Ukraine

Sport
- Country: Ukraine
- Sport: Archery
- Event: Recurve
Medal record
Women's archery
Representing Ukraine
Summer Universiade
Bronze medal – third place	2019 Naples	Team
Bronze medal – third place	2019 Naples	Mixed team
European Indoor Championships
Gold medal – first place	2022 Laško	Team
Bronze medal – third place	2019 Samsun	Team
World Youth Championships
Gold medal – first place	2013 Wuxi	Team
World Junior Indoor Championships
Gold medal – first place	2012 Las Vegas	Team
Silver medal – second place	2014 Nîmes	Team
Bronze medal – third place	2012 Las Vegas	Individual
- Updated on 25 February 2024

Polina Serhiivna Rodionova (Ukrainian: Поліна Сергіївна Родіонова; born March 14, 1994 in Sumy) is a Ukrainian competitive archer. She's twice 2019 Summer Universiade bronze medalist in women's and mixed recurve team events.

== Career ==
She began doing archery in 2004.

In 2012, Polina won a gold medal in recurve team event and also a bronze medal in individual recurve event at the 2012 World Indoor Archery Championships, held in Las Vegas, in junior level.

At the 2013 World Archery Youth Championships, held in Wuxi, Polina became a world champion in recurve team event.

In 2014, Polina won a silver medal in recurve team event at the 2014 World Indoor Archery Championships in junior level.

In 2015, she received a bronze medal in individual recurve event at the international competition "Kings of archery" in Eindhoven, Netherlands.

The following years, Polina won two bronze medals in recurve team and recurve mixed team events at the 2019 Summer Universiade in Naples. In that year she also received a bronze medal in recurve team event at the 2019 European Indoor Archery Championships in Samsun.

In 2022, Polina won a gold medal in recurve team event at the 2022 European Indoor Archery Championships in Laško.
