= Cui Yuanyuan =

Chinese archer (born 1992)

Medal record

Representing China

Women's Archery

World Cup
Bronze medal – third place	2013 Paris	Individual

Cui Yuanyuan (Chinese: 崔媛媛; pinyin: Cuī Yuànyuàn; born February 15, 1992) is an archer from the People's Republic of China.

Cui was first selected to represent China during the 2013 season, during which she won medals at the 2nd and 3rd stage of the World Cup, qualifying for the final where she finished 3rd. She also competed at the 2013 World Archery Championships.
