= 2017 Archery World Cup =

International archery competition

The 2017 Archery World Cup is the 12th edition of the international archery circuit organised annually by the World Archery Federation.

== Calendar ==
Stage	Date	Location
1	16–21 May	Shanghai, China
2	6–11 June	Antalya, Turkey
3	20–25 June	Salt Lake City, United States
4	8–13 August	Berlin, Germany
Final	2–3 September	Rome, Italy

== Results ==
=== Recurve ===
==== Men's individual ====
Stage	Date	Location	1st place, gold medalist(s)	2nd place, silver medalist(s)	3rd place, bronze medalist(s)	Ref.
1	22 May	(China) Shanghai	(Netherlands) Steve Wijler	(South Korea) Kim Woo-jin	(South Korea) Im Dong-hyun	
2	11 June	(Turkey) Antalya	(France) Jean-Charles Valladont	(United States) Brady Ellison	(Italy) David Pasqualucci	
3	25 June	(United States) Salt Lake City	(South Korea) Im Dong-hyun	(South Korea) Kim Woo-jin	(Chinese Taipei) Wei Chun-heng	
4	13 August	(Germany) Berlin	(South Korea) Kim Woo-jin	(South Korea) Kim Jong-ho	(Canada) Crispin Duenas	
Final	3 September	(Italy) Rome	(South Korea) Kim Woo-jin	(United States) Brady Ellison	(South Korea) Im Dong-hyun	

==== Women's individual ====
Stage	Date	Location	1st place, gold medalist(s)	2nd place, silver medalist(s)	3rd place, bronze medalist(s)	Ref.
1	22 May	(China) Shanghai	(South Korea) Ki Bo-bae	(South Korea) Chang Hye-jin	(Japan) Ren Hayakawa	
2	11 June	(Turkey) Antalya	(Russia) Ksenia Perova	(Chinese Taipei) Lin Shih-chia	(Chinese Taipei) Le Chien-ying	
3	25 June	(United States) Salt Lake City	(South Korea) Chang Hye-jin	(Chinese Taipei) Tan Ya-ting	(South Korea) Choi Mi-sun	
4	13 August	(Germany) Berlin	(South Korea) Kang Chae-young	(Mexico) Alejandra Valencia	(Ukraine) Veronika Marchenko	
Final	3 September	(Italy) Rome	(South Korea) Ki Bo-bae	(Russia) Ksenia Perova	(South Korea) Chang Hye-jin	

==== Men's team ====
Stage	Date	Location	1st place, gold medalist(s)	2nd place, silver medalist(s)	3rd place, bronze medalist(s)	Ref.
1	22 May	(China) Shanghai	Kazakhstan Sanzhar Mussayev; Oibek Saidiyev; Denis Gankin	South Korea Im Dong-hyun; Kim Woo-jin; Oh Jin-hyek	Japan Hideki Kikuchi; Tomoki Sugio; Takaharu Furukawa	
2	11 June	(Turkey) Antalya	Italy	Kazakhstan	Japan	
3	25 June	(United States) Salt Lake City	Russia	Chinese Taipei	Malaysia	
4	13 August	(Germany) Berlin	France	Netherlands	South Korea	

==== Women's team ====
Stage	Date	Location	1st place, gold medalist(s)	2nd place, silver medalist(s)	3rd place, bronze medalist(s)	Ref.
1	22 May	(China) Shanghai	Russia	United States	China	
2	11 June	(Turkey) Antalya	Chinese Taipei	Japan	Germany	
3	25 June	(United States) Salt Lake City	Chinese Taipei	South Korea	China	
4	13 August	(Germany) Berlin	South Korea	Mexico	Russia	

==== Mixed team ====
Stage	Date	Location	1st place, gold medalist(s)	2nd place, silver medalist(s)	3rd place, bronze medalist(s)	Ref.
1	22 May	(China) Shanghai	Chinese Taipei	South Korea	United States	
2	11 June	(Turkey) Antalya	Chinese Taipei	France	Spain	
3	25 June	(United States) Salt Lake City	South Korea	Chinese Taipei	United States	
4	13 August	(Germany) Berlin	South Korea	Japan	United States	
Final	3 September	(Italy) Rome	South Korea	Italy	—N/a	

=== Compound ===
==== Men's individual ====
Stage	Date	Location	1st place, gold medalist(s)	2nd place, silver medalist(s)	3rd place, bronze medalist(s)	Ref.
1	21 May	(China) Shanghai	(Denmark) Stephan Hansen	(France) Pierre-Julien Deloche	(Australia) Patrick Coghlan	
2	10 June	(Turkey) Antalya	(Chinese Taipei) Chen Hsiang-hsuan	(United States) Steve Anderson	(United States) Braden Gellenthien	
3	24 June	(United States) Salt Lake City	(Netherlands) Mike Schloesser	(Denmark) Stephan Hansen	(United States) Bridger Deaton	
4	12 August	(Germany) Berlin	(Turkey) Demir Elmaağaçlı	(Denmark) Stephan Hansen	(United States) Braden Gellenthien	
Final	2 September	(Italy) Rome	(United States) Braden Gellenthien	(Denmark) Stephan Hansen	(United States) Steve Anderson	

==== Women's Individual ====
Stage	Date	Location	1st place, gold medalist(s)	2nd place, silver medalist(s)	3rd place, bronze medalist(s)	Ref.
1	21 May	(China) Shanghai	(Colombia) Sara López	(Denmark) Sarah Sonnichsen	(Belgium) Sarah Prieels	
2	10 June	(Turkey) Antalya	(Denmark) Sarah Sonnichsen	(Denmark) Tanja Jensen	(Colombia) Sara López	
3	24 June	(United States) Salt Lake City	(Spain) Andrea Marcos	(Denmark) Sarah Sonnichsen	(Colombia) Sara López	
4	12 August	(Germany) Berlin	(Denmark) Sarah Sonnichsen	(Turkey) Yeşim Bostan	(Netherlands) Sanne de Laat	
Final	2 September	(United States) Braden Gellenthien	(Colombia) Sara López	(Denmark) Tanja Jensen	(Turkey) Yeşim Bostan	

==== Men's team ====
Stage	Date	Location	1st place, gold medalist(s)	2nd place, silver medalist(s)	3rd place, bronze medalist(s)	Ref.
1	21 May	(China) Shanghai	India	Colombia	United States	
2	10 June	(Turkey) Antalya	Denmark	United States	France	
3	24 June	(United States) Salt Lake City	South Korea	Italy	France	
4	12 August	(Germany) Berlin	United States	Denmark	Germany	

==== Women's team ====
Stage	Date	Location	1st place, gold medalist(s)	2nd place, silver medalist(s)	3rd place, bronze medalist(s)	Ref.
1	21 May	(China) Shanghai	South Korea	Denmark	Russia	
2	10 June	(Turkey) Antalya	Denmark	Colombia	Italy	
3	24 June	(United States) Salt Lake City	South Korea	Netherlands	United States	
4	12 August	(Germany) Berlin	United States	United Kingdom	Denmark	

==== Mixed team ====
Stage	Date	Location	1st place, gold medalist(s)	2nd place, silver medalist(s)	3rd place, bronze medalist(s)	Ref.
1	21 May	(China) Shanghai	South Korea	Denmark	United States	
2	10 June	(Turkey) Antalya	Denmark	Chinese Taipei	India	
3	24 June	(United States) Salt Lake City	Colombia	Mexico	South Korea	
4	12 August	(Germany) Berlin	United States	Mexico	Denmark	
Final	2 September	(Italy) Rome	Denmark	Italy	—N/a	

== Medals table ==
Rank	Nation	Gold	Silver	Bronze	Total
1	South Korea	15	7	6	28
2	Denmark	7	10	2	19
3	Chinese Taipei	5	5	2	12
4	United States	4	5	10	19
5	Colombia	3	2	2	7
6	Russia	3	1	2	6
7	France	2	2	2	6
8	Netherlands	2	2	1	5
9	Italy	1	3	2	6
10	Turkey	1	1	1	3
11	Kazakhstan	1	1	0	2
12	India	1	0	1	2
12	Spain	1	0	1	2
14	Mexico	0	4	0	4
15	Japan	0	2	3	5
16	Great Britain	0	1	0	1
17	China	0	0	2	2
17	Germany	0	0	2	2
19	Australia	0	0	1	1
19	Belgium	0	0	1	1
19	Canada	0	0	1	1
19	Malaysia	0	0	1	1
19	Ukraine	0	0	1	1
Totals (23 entries)		46	46	44	136
