= Julio Ricardo Fierro =

Mexican archer

Medal record

Representing Mexico

Men's Archery

World Cup
| Silver medal – second place | 2012 Shanghai | Individual |
| Silver medal – second place | 2014 Wrocław | Team |
| Bronze medal – third place | 2011 Shanghai | Team |
| Bronze medal – third place | 2012 Ogden | Team |
| Bronze medal – third place | 2012 Tokyo | Individual |

World Indoor Championships
| Bronze medal – third place | 2012 Las Vegas | Individual |

Julio Ricardo Fierro (born February 12, 1990) is a compound archer from Mexico.

He has won numerous medals at the FITA Archery World Cup, including a bronze medal at the 2012 World Cup final, has competed at the World Archery Championships and was the 2010 regional champion. His highest world ranking is seven, achieved in 2012.
