= 2013 Archery World Cup =

International archery competition

2013 Archery World Cup Final
- Venue: Fontaines du Trocadéro (Final)
- Location: Paris, France (Final)
- Start date: May
- End date: 22 September

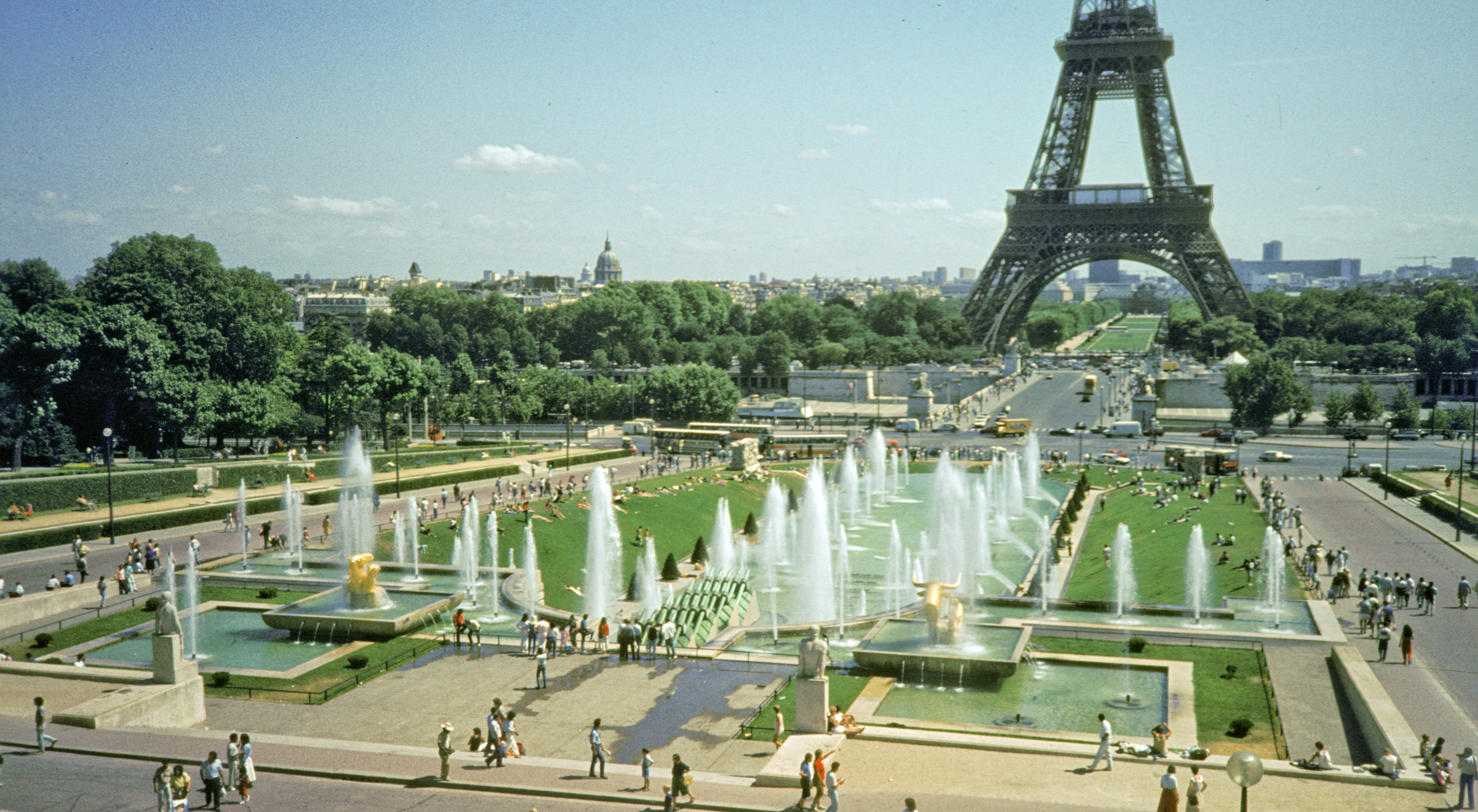
Fontaines du Trocadéro, venue for the finals.

The 2013 Archery World Cup was the 8th edition of the annual international archery circuit, organised by the World Archery Federation. Archers in the recurve and compound disciplines acquired qualifying points based on their performance. The top mixed team and the top seven individual archers over the course of the four stages (with no more than two from one nation) joined the leading non-qualified host nation archer for the finals.

In recurve, South Korea was the most successful nation, with Olympic champion Oh Jin-hyek and Yun Ok-hee winning both the individual and the team competition. The compound competition saw Martin Damsbo and newcomer Alejandra Usquiano win the individual competitions, and hosts France win the mixed team.

== Competition rules and scoring ==
The compound legs consisted of a 50m qualification round of 72 arrows, followed by the compound round at 50m on a 6-zone target face, using cumulative scoring for all individual, team and mixed competitions. The top seven individual performers (with no more than two from each country,) plus one host nation representative if not already qualified, proceeded to the finals; the top mixed team performer proceeded to face the host nation at the finals, which were the same competition format as the legs. The team competition was not competed at the finals.

The recurve legs consisted of a FITA qualification round, followed by a 72m Olympic set system. The top seven individual performers (with no more than two from each country), plus one host nation representative if not already qualified, proceeded to the finals; the top mixed team performer proceeded to face the host nation at the finals, which were the same competition format as the legs. The team competition was not competed at the finals.

The scores awarded in the four stages were as follows:

=== Individual scoring ===
Position	Points
1st place	25
2nd place	21
3rd place	18
4th place	15
5th place	13
6th place	12
7th place	11
8th place	10
9th–16th place	5

=== Mixed team scoring ===
Position	Points
1st place	16
2nd place	12
3rd place	10
4th place	8
5th place	4
6th place	3
7th place	2
8th place	1

== Calendar ==
Stage	Date	Location
1	18–19 May	Shanghai, China
2	15–16 June	Antalya, Turkey
3	20–21 July	Medellín, Colombia
4	24–25 August	Wrocław, Poland
Final	21–22 September	Fontaines du Trocadéro, Paris, France

== Results ==
=== Recurve ===
==== Men's individual ====
Stage	Date	Location	1st place, gold medalist(s)	2nd place, silver medalist(s)	3rd place, bronze medalist(s)	Ref.
1	19 May	(China) Shanghai	(South Korea) Oh Jin-hyek	(South Korea) Jin Jae-wang	(Japan) Shungo Tabata	
2	16 June	(Turkey) Antalya	(South Korea) Oh Jin-hyek	(Mexico) Juan René Serrano	(China) Zhang Jianping	
3	21 July	(Colombia) Medellín	(China) Dai Xiaoxiang	(Luxembourg) Jeff Henckels	(China) Zhang Jianping	
4	25 August	(Poland) Wrocław	(South Korea) Lee Seung-yun	(South Korea) Jin Jae-wang	(South Korea) Im Dong-hyun	
Final	22 September	(France) Paris	(South Korea) Oh Jin-hyek	(China) Dai Xiaoxiang	(United States) Brady Ellison	

==== Women's individual ====
Stage	Date	Location	1st place, gold medalist(s)	2nd place, silver medalist(s)	3rd place, bronze medalist(s)	Ref.
1	19 May	(China) Shanghai	(South Korea) Yun Ok-hee	(India) Deepika Kumari	(South Korea) Joo Hyun-jung	
2	16 June	(Turkey) Antalya	(China) Cui Yuanyuan	(South Korea) Yun Ok-hee	(South Korea) Ki Bo-bae	
3	21 July	(Colombia) Medellín	(Russia) Inna Stepanova	(United States) Miranda Leek	(China) Cui Yuanyuan	
4	25 August	(Poland) Wrocław	(South Korea) Yun Ok-hee	(South Korea) Ki Bo-bae	(Mexico) Alejandra Valencia	
Final	22 September	(France) Paris	(South Korea) Yun Ok-hee	(India) Deepika Kumari	(China) Cui Yuanyuan	

==== Men's team ====
Stage	Date	Location	1st place, gold medalist(s)	2nd place, silver medalist(s)	3rd place, bronze medalist(s)	Ref.
1	19 May	(China) Shanghai	South Korea	China	France	
2	16 June	(Turkey) Antalya	South Korea	Japan	China	
3	21 July	(Colombia) Medellín	Mexico	Malaysia	United States	
4	25 August	(Poland) Wrocław	South Korea	United States	Mexico	

==== Women's team ====
Stage	Date	Location	1st place, gold medalist(s)	2nd place, silver medalist(s)	3rd place, bronze medalist(s)	Ref.
1	19 May	(China) Shanghai	Chinese Taipei	Ukraine	South Korea	
2	16 June	(Turkey) Antalya	South Korea	Japan	Ukraine	
3	21 July	(Colombia) Medellín	India	China	United States	
4	25 August	(Poland) Wrocław	India	South Korea	Denmark	

==== Mixed team ====
Stage	Date	Location	1st place, gold medalist(s)	2nd place, silver medalist(s)	3rd place, bronze medalist(s)	Ref.
1	19 May	(China) Shanghai	United States	India	South Korea	
2	16 June	(Turkey) Antalya	China	South Korea	Mexico	
3	21 July	(Colombia) Medellín	China	United States	India	
4	25 August	(Poland) Wrocław	South Korea	Italy	Chinese Taipei	
Final	22 September	(France) Paris	South Korea	France	—N/a	

=== Compound ===
==== Men's individual ====
Stage	Date	Location	1st place, gold medalist(s)	2nd place, silver medalist(s)	3rd place, bronze medalist(s)	Ref.
1	18 May	(China) Shanghai	(United States) Braden Gellenthien	(Denmark) Martin Damsbo	(United States) Reo Wilde	
2	15 June	(Turkey) Antalya	(Denmark) Patrick Laursen	(Austria) Georg Dollinger	(Denmark) Martin Damsbo	
3	20 July	(Colombia) Medellín	(United States) Reo Wilde	(United States) Braden Gellenthien	(Canada) Dietmar Trillus	
4	24 August	(Poland) Wrocław	(France) Pierre-Julien Deloche	(Italy) Sergio Pagni	(Russia) Alexander Dambaev	
Final	21 September	(France) Paris	(Denmark) Martin Damsbo	(United States) Braden Gellenthien	(Italy) Sergio Pagni	

==== Women's individual ====
Stage	Date	Location	1st place, gold medalist(s)	2nd place, silver medalist(s)	3rd place, bronze medalist(s)	Ref.
1	18 May	(China) Shanghai	(South Korea) Seok Ji-hyun	(United States) Erika Jones	(Russia) Albina Loginova	
2	15 June	(Turkey) Antalya	(Colombia) Sara López	(South Korea) Seok Ji-hyun	(Germany) Kristina Berger	
3	20 July	(Colombia) Medellín	(Colombia) Alejandra Usquiano	(United States) Erika Jones	(Venezuela) Ana Mendoza	
4	24 August	(Poland) Wrocław	(Russia) Albina Loginova	(United States) Erika Jones	(Germany) Kristina Berger	
Final	21 September	(France) Paris	(Colombia) Alejandra Usquiano	(United States) Erika Jones	(Russia) Albina Loginova	

==== Men's team ====
Stage	Date	Location	1st place, gold medalist(s)	2nd place, silver medalist(s)	3rd place, bronze medalist(s)	Ref.
1	18 May	(China) Shanghai	United States	Italy	South Korea	
2	15 June	(Turkey) Antalya	Denmark	United States	France	
3	20 July	(Colombia) Medellín	France	United States	India	
4	24 August	(Poland) Wrocław	United States	South Africa	South Korea	

==== Women's team ====
Stage	Date	Location	1st place, gold medalist(s)	2nd place, silver medalist(s)	3rd place, bronze medalist(s)	Ref.
1	18 May	(China) Shanghai	South Korea	United States	India	
2	15 June	(Turkey) Antalya	Colombia	United States	Russia	
3	20 July	(Colombia) Medellín	United States	Colombia	Venezuela	
4	24 August	(Poland) Wrocław	Italy	United States	South Korea	

==== Mixed team ====
Stage	Date	Location	1st place, gold medalist(s)	2nd place, silver medalist(s)	3rd place, bronze medalist(s)	Ref.
1	18 May	(China) Shanghai	United States	South Korea	Italy	
2	15 June	(Turkey) Antalya	Italy	India	Canada	
3	20 July	(Colombia) Medellín	Italy	Denmark	Belgium	
4	24 August	(Poland) Wrocław	United States	Russia	Netherlands	
Final	21 September	(France) Paris	France	Italy	—N/a	

== Medals table ==
Rank	Nation	Gold	Silver	Bronze	Total
1	South Korea	15	8	8	31
2	United States	8	14	4	26
3	China	4	3	5	12
4	Colombia	4	1	0	5
5	Italy	3	4	2	9
6	Denmark	3	2	2	7
7	France	3	1	2	6
8	India	2	4	3	9
9	Russia	2	1	4	7
10	Mexico	1	1	3	5
11	Chinese Taipei	1	0	1	2
12	Japan	0	2	1	3
13	Ukraine	0	1	1	2
14	Austria	0	1	0	1
14	Luxembourg	0	1	0	1
14	Malaysia	0	1	0	1
14	South Africa	0	1	0	1
18	Canada	0	0	2	2
18	Germany	0	0	2	2
18	Venezuela	0	0	2	2
21	Belgium	0	0	1	1
21	Netherlands	0	0	1	1
Totals (22 entries)		46	46	44	136

== Qualification ==
=== Recurve ===
==== Men's individual ====
Pos.	Name	Points	(China)	(Turkey)	(Colombia)	(Poland)	
1.	(South Korea) Oh Jin-hyek	65	25	25	–	15	Q
2.	(South Korea) Lee Seung-yun	50	13	12	–	25	Q
3.	(South Korea) Jin Jae-wang	42	21	–	–	21	^{1}
4.	(Italy) Mauro Nespoli	39	11	15	13	–	Q
5.	(China) Zhang Jianping	36	–	18	18	–	Q
6.	(United States) Brady Ellison	35	–	13	12	10	Q
7.	(South Korea) Im Dong-hyun	33	10	5	–	18	^{1}
8.	(China) Dai Xiaoxiang	25	–	–	25	–	Q
8.	(Malaysia) Khairul Anuar Mohamad	25	15	10	–	–	Q
10.	(Luxembourg) Jeff Henckels	21	–	–	21	–	
10.	(Mexico) Juan Rene Serrano	21	–	21	–	–	

^{1.} Could not qualify as national quota already reached

==== Women's individual ====
Pos.	Name	Points	(China)	(Turkey)	(Colombia)	(Poland)	
1.	(South Korea) Yun Ok-hee	71	25	21	–	25	Q
2.	(South Korea) Joo Hyun-jung	48	18	15	–	15	Q
3.	(India) Deepika Kumari	45	21	–	12	12	Q
4.	(South Korea) Ki Bo-bae	44	5	18	–	21	^{1}
5.	(China) Cui Yuanyuan	43	–	25	18	–	Q
6.	(Russia) Inna Stepanova	40	–	10	25	5	Q
7.	(Mexico) Aída Román	33	10	12	5	11	Q
8.	(Mexico) Alejandra Valencia	23	–	–	5	18	Q
9.	(United States) Miranda Leek	21	–	–	21	–	
10.	(Colombia) Ana Rendón	20	–	5	15	–	

^{1.} Could not qualify as national quota already reached

==== Mixed team ====
Pos.	Team	Points	(China)	(Turkey)	(Colombia)	(Poland)	
1.	South Korea	38	10	12	–	16	Q
2.	China	32	–	16	16	–	
2.	United States	32	16	–	12	4	
4.	Mexico	29	8	10	8	3	
5.	India	22	12	–	10	–	

=== Compound ===
==== Men's individual ====
Pos.	Name	Points	(China)	(Turkey)	(Colombia)	(Poland)	
1.	(United States) Braden Gellenthien	61	25	15	21	5	Q
2.	(United States) Reo Wilde	56	18	13	25	12	Q
3.	(Denmark) Martin Damsbo	54	21	18	15	–	Q
4.	(Italy) Sergio Pagni	36	10	–	5	21	Q
5.	(France) Pierre-Julien Deloche	30	5	–	–	25	Q
5.	(Denmark) Patrick Laursen	30	–	25	–	5	Q
7.	(France) Dominique Genet	28	–	–	13	15	Q
8.	(United States) Dave Cousins	25	15	–	–	10	^{1}
8.	(South Korea) Min Li-hong	25	12	13	–	–	Q
10.	(India) Rajat Chauhan	23	13	5	5	–	
10.	(South Korea) Choi Yong-hee	23	5	5	–	13	

^{1.} Could not qualify as national quota already reached

==== Women's individual ====
Pos.	Name	Points	(China)	(Turkey)	(Colombia)	(Poland)	
1.	(United States) Erika Jones	63	21	5	21	21	Q
2.	(Russia) Albina Loginova	56	18	–	13	25	Q
3.	(Colombia) Sara López	53	–	25	15	13	Q
4.	(South Korea) Seok Ji-hyun	51	25	21	–	5	Q
5.	(Germany) Kristina Berger	41	5	18	–	18	Q
6.	(Colombia) Alejandra Usquiano	37	–	–	25	12	Q
7.	(France) Pascale Lebecque	33	–	13	10	10	Q
7.	(South Korea) Choi Bo-min	33	13	5	–	15	
9.	(South Korea) Youn So-jung	25	10	15	–	–	
10.	(Mexico) Linda Ochoa	22	5	12	5	–	
10.	(France) Sophie Dodemont	22	–	12	5	5	Q^{1}

^{1.} Qualified for final as leading non-qualified archer from host country

==== Mixed team ====
Pos.	Team	Points	(China)	(Turkey)	(Colombia)	(Poland)	
1.	Italy	44	10	16	16	2	Q
2.	United States	37	16	1	4	16	
3.	Mexico	21	3	2	8	8	
4.	Russia	20	4	4	–	12	
5.	South Korea	16	12	–	–	4	

=== Nations ranking ===
Pos.	Nation	Points	(China)	(Turkey)	(Colombia)	(Poland)
1.	South Korea	923	341	252	–	330
2.	United States	757	208	116	268	165
3.	Italy	346	121	61	52	112
4.	France	305	36	86	123	60
5.	India	288	72	33	113	70
6.	China	285	42	90	153	–
7.	Mexico	283	31	73	108	71
8.	Russia	254	30	82	47	95
9.	Colombia	230	–	70	115	45
10.	Denmark	184	21	88	44	31

== World Cup Final ==
=== Recurve ===
==== Men's individual ====
Quarterfinals
1	(South Korea) Oh Jin-hyek	1	2	1	1	0^{1}
8	(France) Gaël Prévost	1	0	1	1	2^{0}
5	(United States) Brady Ellison	2	1	1	2
4	(China) Zhang Jianping	0	1	1	0
3	(Italy) Mauro Nespoli	0	0	2	0
6	(China) Dai Xiaoxiang	2	2	0	2
7	(Malaysia) Khairul Anuar Mohamad	1	1	0	1	0
2	(South Korea) Lee Seung-yun	1	1	2	1	2

Semifinals
1	(South Korea) Oh Jin-hyek	1	2	1	2
5	(United States) Brady Ellison	1	0	1	0
6	(China) Dai Xiaoxiang	2	2	1	0	2
2	(South Korea) Lee Seung-yun	0	0	1	2	0

Finals
1	(South Korea) Oh Jin-hyek	2	0	2	1	2
6	(China) Dai Xiaoxiang	0	2	0	1	0
Third place
5	(United States) Brady Ellison	0	1	1	2	1^{1}
2	(South Korea) Lee Seung-yun	2	1	1	0	1^{0}

==== Women's individual ====
Quarterfinals
1	(South Korea) Yun Ok-hee	2	2	2
8	(France) Cyrielle Cotry	0	0	0
5	(Russia) Inna Stepanova	0	2	0	1	1
4	(China) Cui Yuanyuan	2	0	2	1	1
3	(India) Deepika Kumari	1	2	2	2
6	(Mexico) Aída Román	1	0	0	0
7	(Mexico) Alejandra Valencia	2	0	2	2
2	(South Korea) Joo Hyun-jung	0	2	0	0

Semifinals
1	(South Korea) Yun Ok-hee	2	1	1	1	2
4	(China) Cui Yuanyuan	0	1	1	1	0
3	(India) Deepika Kumari	0	0	2	1	2^{1}
7	(Mexico) Alejandra Valencia	2	2	0	1	0^{0}

Finals
1	(South Korea) Yun Ok-hee	0	1	2	2	1
3	(India) Deepika Kumari	2	1	0	0	1
Third place
4	(China) Cui Yuanyuan	0	2	2	1	1
7	(Mexico) Alejandra Valencia	2	0	0	1	1

==== Mixed team ====
Finals
1	South Korea; Yun Ok-hee; Oh Jin-hyek	152
2	France; Cyrielle Cotry; Gaël Prévost	140

=== Compound ===
==== Men's individual ====
Quarterfinals
1	(United States) Braden Gellenthien	148
8	(South Korea) Min Li-hong	147
5	(France) Pierre-Julien Deloche	146
4	(Italy) Sergio Pagni	149
3	(Denmark) Martin Damsbo	143
6	(Denmark) Patrick Laursen	141
7	(France) Dominique Genet	145
2	(United States) Reo Wilde	142

Semifinals
1	(United States) Braden Gellenthien	146
4	(Italy) Sergio Pagni	144
3	(Denmark) Martin Damsbo	147
7	(France) Dominique Genet	143

Finals
1	(United States) Braden Gellenthien	141^{9}
3	(Denmark) Martin Damsbo	141^{10}
Third place
4	(Italy) Sergio Pagni	147
7	(France) Dominique Genet	142

==== Women's individual ====
Quarterfinals
1	(United States) Erika Jones	146
8	(France) Sophie Dodemont	135
5	(Germany) Kristina Berger	141^{9}
4	(South Korea) Seok Ji-hyun	141^{9*}
3	(Colombia) Sara López	143^{9}
6	(Colombia) Alejandra Usquiano	143^{10}
7	(France) Pascale Lebecque	138
2	(Russia) Albina Loginova	140

Semifinals
1	(United States) Erika Jones	144
4	(South Korea) Seok Ji-hyun	142
6	(Colombia) Alejandra Usquiano	144
2	(Russia) Albina Loginova	140

Finals
1	(United States) Erika Jones	142
6	(Colombia) Alejandra Usquiano	143
Third place
4	(South Korea) Seok Ji-hyun	141
2	(Russia) Albina Loginova	142

==== Mixed team ====
Finals
1	Italy; Marcella Tonioli; Sergio Pagni	155
2	France; Pascale Lebecque; Pierre-Julien Deloche	157
