= Brady Ellison =

American archer (born 1988)

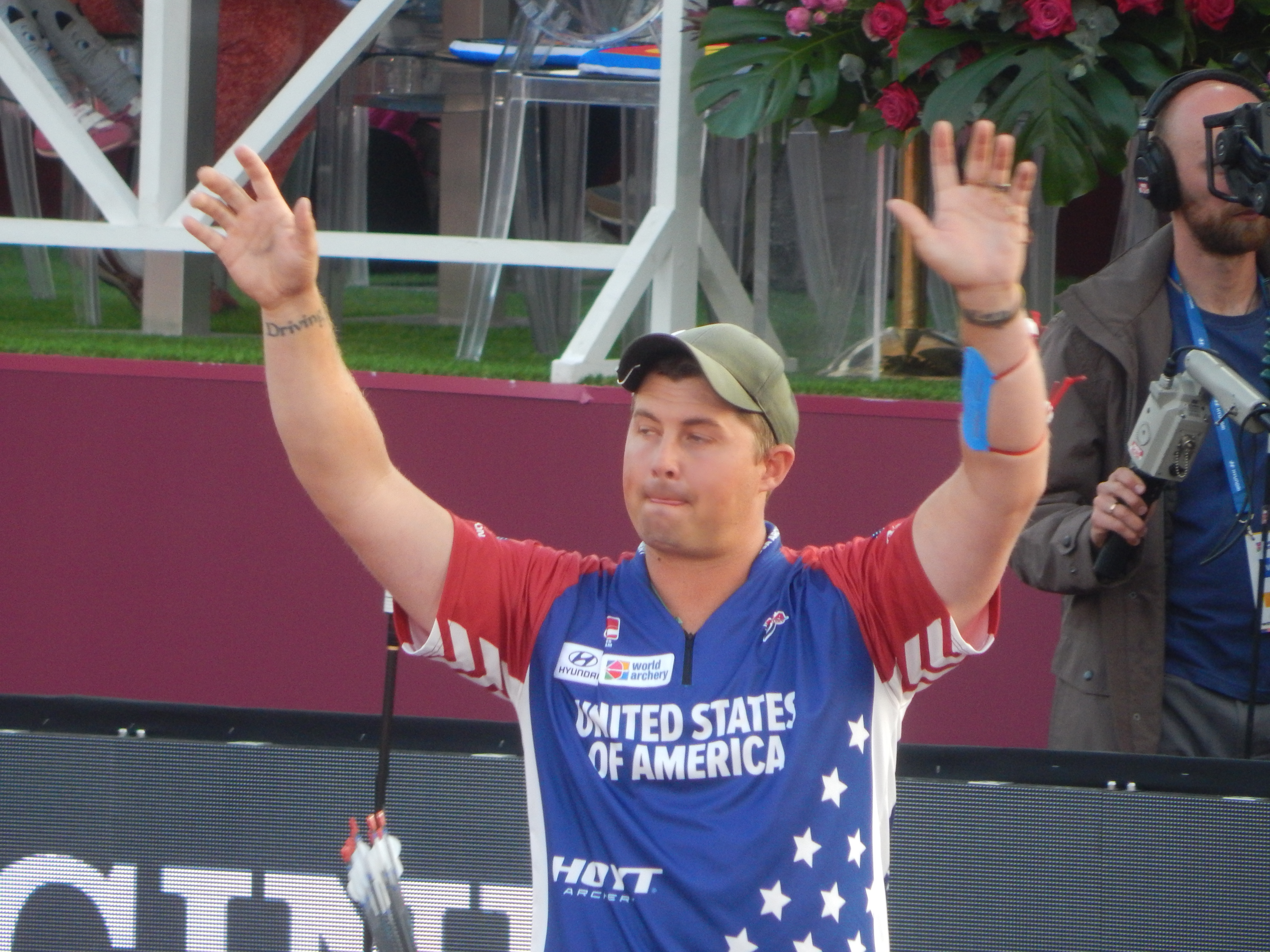
- Ellison at the 2019 World Cup Final

Personal information
- Full name: Brady Lee Ellison
- Born: October 27, 1988 (age 37) Glendale, Arizona, U.S.
- Height: 6 ft 0 in (183 cm)
- Weight: 190 lb (86 kg)
Medal record
Event	1st	2nd	3rd
Olympic Games	0	3	2
World Championships	2	3	2
World Indoor Championships	2	0	2
Pan American Games	6	2	1
Total	10	8	7
Men's recurve archery
Representing the United States
Olympic Games
Silver medal – second place	2012 London	Team
Silver medal – second place	2016 Rio de Janeiro	Team
Silver medal – second place	2024 Paris	Individual
Bronze medal – third place	2016 Rio de Janeiro	Individual
Bronze medal – third place	2024 Paris	Mixed
World Championships
Gold medal – first place	2013 Belek	Team
Gold medal – first place	2019 's-Hertogenbosch	Individual
Silver medal – second place	2013 Belek	Mixed team
Silver medal – second place	2021 Yankton	Team
Silver medal – second place	2025 Gwangju	Team
Bronze medal – third place	2011 Turin	Individual
Bronze medal – third place	2021 Yankton	Individual
World Indoor Championships
Gold medal – first place	2009 Rzeszów	Team
Gold medal – first place	2012 Las Vegas	Team
Bronze medal – third place	2012 Las Vegas	Individual
Bronze medal – third place	2014 Nîmes	Individual
Indoor Archery World Series
Silver medal – second place	2018 Rome	Individual
Silver medal – second place	2019 Las Vegas (FINALS)	Individual
Silver medal – second place	2019 Rome	Individual
Gold medal – first place	2020 Nîmes	Individual
Gold medal – first place	2020 Las Vegas	Individual
Silver medal – second place	2020 Las Vegas (FINALS)	Individual
Gold medal – first place	2020 December online	Individual
Gold medal – first place	2021 January online	Individual
Gold medal – first place	2021 Yankton	Individual
Gold medal – first place	2022 Las Vegas	Individual
Gold medal – first place	2024 Las Vegas	Individual
Gold medal – first place	2024 Las Vegas (FINALS)	Individual
Gold medal – first place	2025 Nîmes	Individual
Silver medal – second place	2025 Chicago	Individual
Gold medal – first place	2025 Las Vegas	Individual
Gold medal – first place	2025 Las Vegas (FINALS)	Individual
Gold medal – first place	2025 Rio Janeiro	Individual
World Field Championships
Gold medal – first place	2014 Zagreb	Individual
Gold medal – first place	2014 Zagreb	Team
Gold medal – first place	2016 Dublin	Individual
Gold medal – first place	2016 Dublin	Team
Gold medal – first place	2024 Lac La Biche	Individual
Silver medal – second place	2018 Cortina	Team
Bronze medal – third place	2018 Cortina	Individual
Bronze medal – third place	2022 Yankton	Team
World Cup
Gold medal – first place	2010 Edinburgh	Individual
Gold medal – first place	2011 Istanbul	Individual
Gold medal – first place	2012 Tokyo	Mixed team
Gold medal – first place	2014 Lausanne	Individual
Gold medal – first place	2016 Odense	Individual
Gold medal – first place	2019 Moscow	Individual
Gold medal – first place	2025 Nanjing	Individual
Silver medal – second place	2012 Tokyo	Individual
Silver medal – second place	2017 Rome	Individual
Silver medal – second place	2021 Yankton	Individual
Bronze medal – third place	2013 Paris	Individual
Bronze medal – third place	2018 Samsun	Individual
World Games
Silver medal – second place	2013 Cali	Individual
Silver medal – second place	2017 Wrocław	Individual
Silver medal – second place	2022 Birmingham	Individual
Pan American Games
Gold medal – first place	2007 Rio de Janeiro	Team
Gold medal – first place	2011 Guadalajara	Individual
Gold medal – first place	2011 Guadalajara	Team
Gold medal – first place	2019 Lima	Mixed team
Gold medal – first place	2023 Santiago	Team
Gold medal – first place	2023 Santiago	Mixed team
Silver medal – second place	2015 Toronto	Individual
Silver medal – second place	2015 Toronto	Team
Bronze medal – third place	2019 Lima	Team
Pan American Championships
Gold medal – first place	2018 Medellín	Team
Gold medal – first place	2018 Medellín	Mixed team
Gold medal – first place	2026 Tlaxcala	Team
Silver medal – second place	2026 Tlaxcala	Mixed team
Bronze medal – third place	2024 Medellín	Team

Brady Ellison (born October 27, 1988) is an American archer who competes in recurve archery. He holds the record for the longest continuous period as the world number-one-ranked men's recurve archer, from August 2011 to April 2013. He earned his nickname "The Prospector" during the 2015 world championships due to his proclivity for 'finding gold'.

== Personal life ==
As a child, Ellison suffered from Legg–Calvé–Perthes disease and wore leg braces for some time. He has had subsequent health issues with his knees, particularly in the lead-up to and during the Rio 2016 Olympic Games, and the fingers of his drawing hand.

Ellison married Slovenian archer Toja Černe (now known as Toja Ellison) in April 2016. He credits his wife with introducing him to alternative medicine, which was used to cure pain in his fingers in late 2018. The pair had their first child in November 2020.

Ellison started archery as a child in Arizona. Initially, Ellison shot with a compound and represented the United States internationally as a youth archer with the bowstyle. He switched to recurve on the recommendation of coaches at the national training center in Chula Vista, California, where he has spent much of his time. He resides in Billings, Montana.

== Career ==
=== Olympics ===
At the 2008 Summer Olympics in Beijing, Ellison finished his ranking round with a total of 664 points, which gave him the 15th seed for the final competition bracket in which he faced John Burnes in the first round. Ellison won the match 111–89 and advanced to the second round. Here he was unable to beat another Canadian Jay Lyon, who was too strong with 113–107. Together with Butch Johnson and Vic Wunderle he also took part in the team event. With his 664 score from the ranking round combined with the 653 of Johnson and the 652 of Wunderle the Americans were in 10th position after the ranking round. In the first round they lost to Chinese Taipei, 222–218.

Ellison secured his spot for the 2012 Olympics at the USA Archery's Olympic Trials in Colorado Springs, Colorado. He was sponsored by Solve Media, Hoyt Archery, Easton Arrows, and Axcel Sight and Scopes, among others. He won a silver team medal together with his teammates Jake Kaminski and Jacob Wukie.

At the 2016 Rio Games, Ellison won an individual bronze medal, and a team silver medal with teammates Jake Kaminski and Zach Garrett.

He represented the United States at the 2020 Summer Olympics held in Tokyo, Japan. He lost to the eventual Gold Medallist Mete Gazoz of Türkiye in the quarterfinals of the men's individual event.

Ellison and Casey Kaufhold won the bronze medal in the mixed team event at the 2024 Summer Olympics held in Paris, France. The duo faced off against Dhiraj Bommadevara and Ankita Bhakat of India in the Bronze Medal match, before defeating them 6–2 to claim Bronze. Ellison then earned the silver medal in the individual event, losing the final 5–6 on a tiebreaker by having his perfect 10 being a couple of millimeters away from the center than that of his opponent five-time Olympic champion Kim Woo-jin of South Korea.

=== World Championships ===
Ellison won medals at several editions of the World Archery Championships.

Two months after the 2020 Summer Olympics, he won the silver medal in the men's team event at the 2021 World Archery Championships held in Yankton, United States. He also won the bronze medal in the men's individual event.

=== The World Games ===
At three editions of The World Games (2013, 2017 and 2022), Ellison won the silver medal in the individual field recurve competition.

=== Other ===
In 2022, he won the men's recurve event at the Vegas Shoot held in Las Vegas, United States.

== In popular culture ==
Ellison appears in Episode 152 of the American-based TV show MythBusters, where he helped to test the myth of the Ancient Greek 'arrow machine gun' (a mythical device that could fire arrows in a way similar to modern machine guns). With Ellison's help, the myth was deemed plausible.

== Individual performance timeline in Outdoor Recurve ==
Tournament	2007	2008	2009	2010	2011	2012	2013	2014	2015	2016	2017	2018	2019	2020	2021	SR
World Archery tournaments
Olympic Games		2R				2R				3rd					QF	0/4
World Championships	3R		3R		3rd		2R		QF		2R		W		3rd	1/8
World Cup																
Stage 1	3R		2R	W	W	W	3R	QF	QF	3R	QF	2nd	W	NH	2R	4/13
Stage 2	3R		4th	3rd	W	3R	QF	QF	4th	W	2nd	3R	3rd	NH	W	3/13
Stage 3	1R	2nd	3R	3R	W	3R	QF	3R	4R	QF	QF	4R	W	NH	W	3/14
Stage 4		1R		3R	3R		QF	QF	4R		QF	4R	QF	NH		0/9
World Cup Final	DNQ	DNQ	DNQ	W	W	2nd	3rd	W	QF	W	2nd	3rd	W	NH	2nd	5/11
End of year world ranking	19	16	14	2	1	1	8	6	5	2	5	7	1	1		
