= Maja Marcen =

Slovenia-born Colombian archer

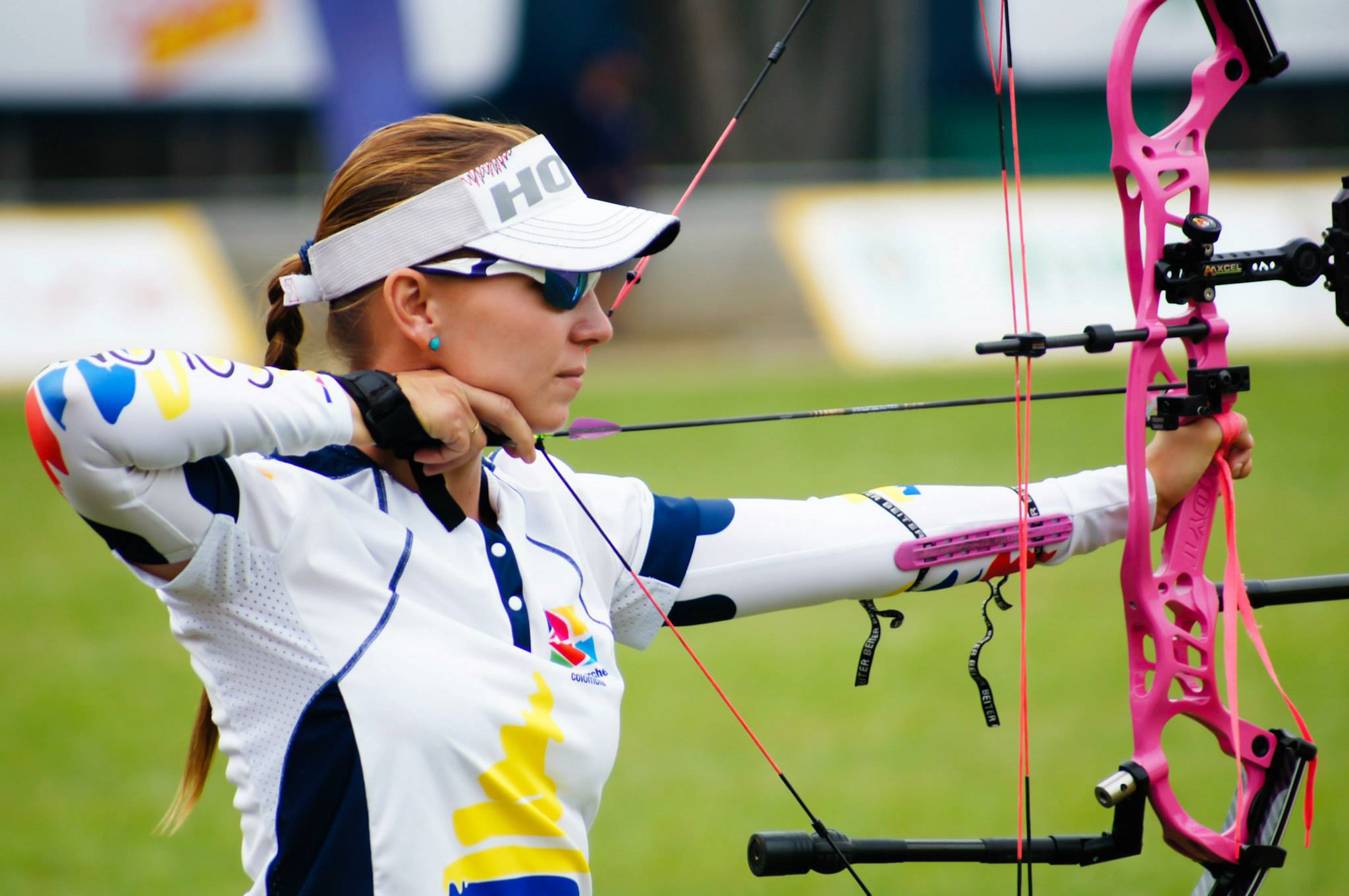
- Maja Marcen
- Born: 14 April 1982 (age 43); Slovenia
- Citizenship: Slovenia / Colombia
- Occupation: Archery (Compound)

Medal record

Women's archery

Representing Colombia

Pan American Championships
Gold medal – first place	2014 Pan American Championships	Team

Archery World Cup
Bronze medal – third place	2014 Stage 4	Team
Silver medal – second place	2013 Stage 3	Team
Gold medal – first place	2013 Stage 2	Team

European Archery Championships
Bronze medal – third place	2010 European Archery Championships	Mixed Team

Maja Marcen (born 14 April 1982) is a Slovenian-born Colombian archer. She started archery in 1992. She originally competed for her home country of Slovenia, but now lives and competes for Colombia in compound archery.

She first competed for the Colombian national team in 2011, and in 2013 she won Gold in Antalya, and Silver medals in Team Women's competition at the 2013 Archery World Cup in Medellín, Colombia.

Marcen placed 1st at the 2014 Pan American Championships in women's team competition with Sara López, and Alejandra Usquiano in Rosario, Italy.

As of February 2015 Marcen's World Archery ranking is 32nd.

== Achievements ==
1994
7th, World Junior Championships 1994, Individual, Italy
2001
18th, Golden Arrow 072, individual, Antalya
2003
42nd World Outdoor Target Championship 176, individual, New York City
2004
20th, European Grand Prix 197, Individual, Rovereto
23rd, European Outdoor Archery Championship 189, Individual, Brussels
9th, European Grand Prix 199, Individual, Wyhl
5th, European Grand Prix 187, Individual, Antalya
2005
24th, European Grand Prix 218, Individual, Antalya
18ty, European Grand Prix 219, Individual, Antalya
42nd, 43th World Outdoor Target Archery Championships 221, Individual, Madrid
2006
14th, Meteksan World Cup Stage 1- EMAU Grand Prix 245, Individual, Poreč
9th, Meteksan World Cup Stage 2- EMAU Grand Prix 238, Individual, Antalya
4th, World University Championships 256, Individual, Slovakia
11th, European Grand Prix 242, Individual, Sassari
20th, European Outdoor Target Championships 243, Individual, Athens
2007
(gold) Slovenian Indoor Nationals, Individual, Slovenia
32nd, World Cup, individual, Varese
(silver) World Outdoor Championships, Individual, Leipzig
12th, World Cup, individual, Dover
2008
5th, Archery World Cup Stage 4 296, Individual, Boé, France
2009
2010
2011
7th, Archery World Cup 2011 Stage 3, Individual, Utah
2012
2013
4th, Archery World Cup 2014 Stage 4, Team Women, Wrocław
33rd, Archery World Cup 2013 Stage 4, Individual, Wrocław
33rd, Archery World Cup 2013 Stage 3, Individual, Wrocław
(silver) Archery World Cup 2013 Stage 3, Team Women, Medellín
(gold) Archery World Cup 2013 Stage 2, Team Women, Medellín
33rd, Archery World Cup 2013 Stage 2, Individual, Wrocław
2014
(gold) Pan American Championships 2014, Team Women, Rosario
(bronze) Archery World Cup 2014 Stage 4, individual, Wrocław
9th, Pan American Championships 2014, Individual, Rosario
9th, Archery World Cup 2014 Stage 4, Individual, Wrocław
33rd, Archery World Cup 2014 Stage 3, Individual Antalya
5th, Archery World Cup 2014 Stage 3, Team Women, Antalya
9th, Archery World Cup 2014 Stage 1, Individual, Shanghai
7th, Archery World Cup 2014 Stage 1, Team Women, Shanghai
9th, Arizona Cup 2014, Individual, Arizona
2015
