= Kristina Timofeeva =

Russian archer (born 1993)

Kristina Timofeeva (born 28 August 1993, in Yakutia) is a Russian female archer. At the 2012 Summer Olympics she competed for her country in the Women's team event.
