= Christopher Perkins (archer) =

Canadian archer (born 1992)

Medal record

Men's archery

Representing Canada

World Championships
Gold medal – first place	2011 Turin	Individual
Bronze medal – third place	2011 Turin	Team
Silver medal – second place	2015 Copenhagen	Team

World Archery Youth Championships
Gold medal – first place	2011 Legnica	Team

World Games
Bronze medal – third place	2022 Burmingham	Individual

Christopher Perkins (born 1 May 1992), is a Canadian compound archer. He won the individual gold medal at the 2011 World Archery Championships, his first senior World Archery competition.
