= Marcella Tonioli =

Italian archer (born 1986)

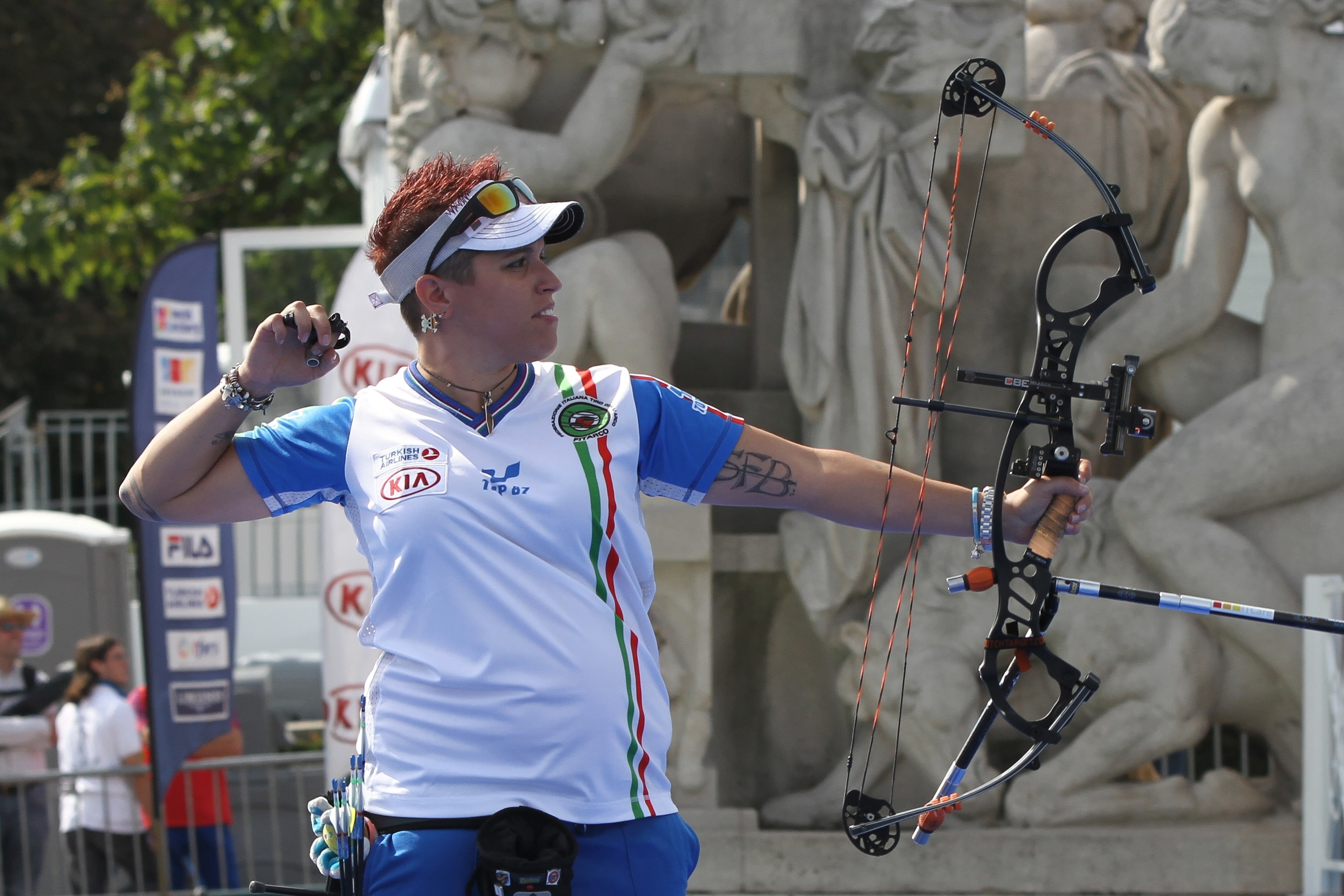
- Marcella Tonioli at FITA Archery World Cup in September 2013.
- Born: 31 May 1986 (age 39); Portomaggiore, Italy
- Citizenship: Italian
- Occupation: Archer

Medal record

Women's compound archery

Representing Italy

World Championships
Gold medal – first place	2011 Turin	Mixed team
Gold medal – first place	2013 Belek	Mixed team

European Championships
Bronze medal – third place	2021 Antalya	Team

European Indoor Championships
Gold medal – first place	2025 Samsun	Team
Silver medal – second place	2024 Varaždin	Team
Silver medal – second place	2025 Samsun	Individual

Marcella Tonioli (born 31 May 1986) is an Italian compound archer. She is one of the best Italian compound archers. The highest world ranking position she has ever achieved is 2nd in 2012

Marcella started archery in 2003, with a recurve bow, until 2009 when she tried compound and started her journey with the national team in 2011.

== Palmares ==
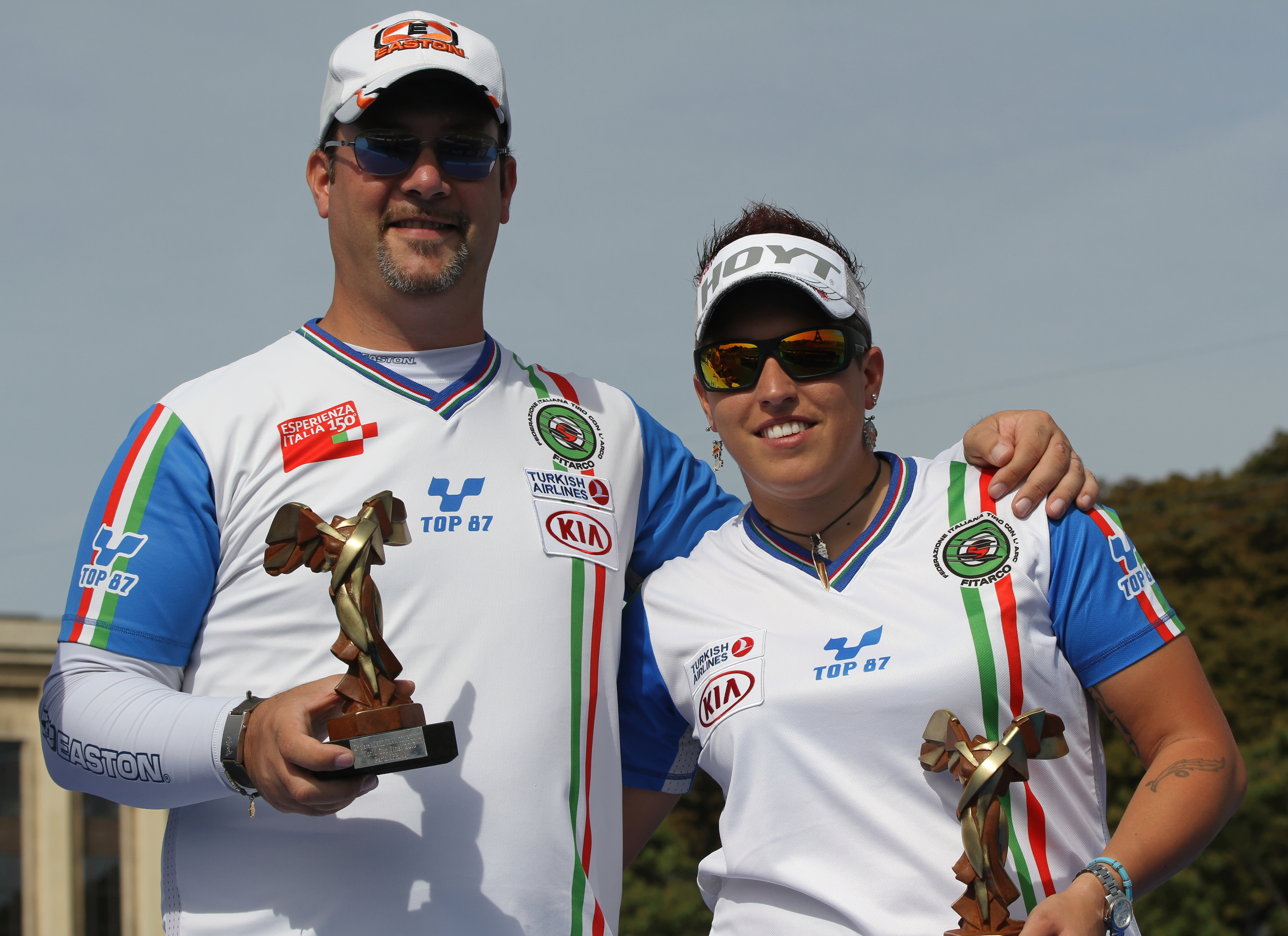
Silver medalists Marcella Tonioli and Sergio Pagni at 2013 FITA Archery World Cup.

2011
(gold) EMAU Grand Prix, mixed team, Antalya
5th, EMAU Grand Prix, individual, Antalya
4th, World Cup, women's team, Poreč
6th, World Cup, mixed team, Poreč
9th, World Cup, individual, Poreč
(gold) 2011 Archery European Indoor Championships, Cambrils
(silver) 2011 Archery European Indoor Championships, Cambrils
(silver) EMAU Grand Prix, women's team, Boé
(bronze) EMAU Grand Prix, mixed team, Boé
4th, EMAU Grand Prix, individual, Boé
6th, World Cup, individual, Antalya
7th, World Cup, women's team, Antalya
(gold) 2011 World Archery Championships, mixed team, Turin
5th, 2011 World Archery Championships, women's team, Turin
6th, 2011 World Archery Championships, individual, Turin
(gold) World Cup, individual, Ogden
(silver) World Cup, mixed team, Ogden
5th, World Cup, individual, Shanghai
(bronze) World Cup Final, individual, Istanbul
2012
4th, World Indoor Championships, women's team, Las Vegas
17th, World Indoor Championships, individual, Las Vegas
(gold) World Cup, individual, Shanghai
(bronze) World Cup, women's team, Shanghai
(silver) World Cup, women's team, Antalya
(silver) World Cup, mixed team, Antalya
(bronze) World Cup, individual, Antalya
(silver) European Outdoor Championships, women's team, Amsterdam
(silver) European Outdoor Championships, mixed team, Amsterdam
(bronze) European Outdoor Championships, individual, Amsterdam
2013
(gold) 2013 Archery European Indoor Championships, women's team Rzeszów
(bronze) World Cup, mixed team, Shanghai
(gold) World Cup, mixed team, Antalya
(gold) World Cup, mixed team, Medellín
(silver) World Games, compound mixed team, Cali
(gold) World Cup, women's team, Wrocław
(silver) World Cup, mixed team, Paris
(gold) World Championships, mixed team, Antalya
