= Vida Halimian =

Iranian archer (born 1988)

Personal information
- Born: September 10, 1988 (age 37)
Medal record
Women's compound archery
Representing Iran
World Championships
Silver medal – second place	2011 Turin	Team
Asian Championships
Bronze medal – third place	2009 Bali	Team
World University Championship
Gold medal – first place	2010 Shenzhen	Individual

Seyedeh Vida Halimian Avval (Persian: سیده ویدا حلیمیان اول, born September 10, 1988) is an Iranian compound archer. She is the current World Archery number 392 in women's compound archery. The highest ranking she has reached is the seventh position.

== Achievements ==
2007
10th, Asian Outdoor Championships, individual, Xi'an
2008
(silver) Asian Grand Prix, individual, Tehran
2009
(gold) Asian Grand Prix, individual, Tehran
16th, World Outdoor Championships, women's team, Ulsan
28th, World Outdoor Championships, individual, Ulsan
(silver) Asian Grand Prix, individual, Dakha
(bronze) Asian Outdoor Championships, women's team, Bali
4th, Asian Outdoor Championships, individual, Bali
2010
(silver) World Cup, women's team, Antalya
(silver) World Cup, mixed team, Shanghai
(gold) World University Championships, individual, Shenzhen
(silver) World University Championships, women's team, Shenzhen

2011
(silver) World Cup, women's team, Antalya
(silver) World Outdoor Championships, women's team, Turin
17th, World Outdoor Championships, individual, Turin
4th, Summer Universiade, mixed team, Shenzhen
5th, Summer Universiade, individual, Shenzhen
6th, Summer Universiade, women's team, Shenzhen
4th, World Cup Final, individual, Istanbul
9th, Asian Outdoor Championships, individual, Tehran

2012
17th, World Cup, individual, Shanghai
7th, World Cup, individual, Antalya

2019
(gold) Asia Cup, mixed team, Bangkok
4th, Asia Cup, individual, Bangkok
(bronze) World cup, mixed team, Shanghai
9th, Asian Championships, individual, Bangkok
4th, Asian Championships, women's team, Bangkok
8th, Asian Championships, mixed team, Bangkok

2021
17th World Cup, individual, Lausanne
4th World Cup, women's team, Lausanne
9th World Cup, mixed team, Lausanne
9th World Cup, individual, Paris

2022
8th Asia Cup, individual, Phuket
(bronze) Asia Cup, women's team Phuket
17th World Cup, individual, Gwangju
8th World Cup, women's team Gwangju
