= Irene Cuesta =

Spanish archer and archery coach

Personal information
- Nationality: Spanish
- Born: Irene Cuesta Cobo; 13 September 1983 (age 42) Granada, Spain
- Relative: Elías Cuesta

Sport
- Country: Spain
- Sport: Archery

Irene Cuesta Cobo (born 13 September 1983) is a Spanish archer and archery coach. She won the Spanish national championship in 2011 and 2013. She has also served as the coach of the Spain national team at the 2012 Summer Paralympics.

== Personal ==
Cuesta was born on 13 September 1983 in Granada. In 2012, she lived in Madrid. She is the sister of 2012 Spanish archery Olympian, Elías Cuesta.

== Archery ==
La Coruña hosted the 2008 Spanish national club championships, which Cuesta competed in alongside teammates Toñi Arroyo, María Teresa Muñoz and Beatriz de la Torre.

In March 2011, she competed at the European Championships in Cambrils, Tarragona where she earned a bronze medal. At the Andalusian Championships in early 2012, Cuesta competed in and finished first in the women's compound event. A few weeks later, she repeated her first-place performance at the Spanish national championships in Valdemorillo, Madrid. Competing at the 2013 Spanish national championships after having won the Andalusian championships, she finished second. In November 2013, she participated in an archery competition held at Chichen Itza, where she won a bronze after defeating British archer Lucy O'Sullivan by a score of 141–132 in the bronze medal match.

=== Coaching and administration ===
Cuesta is a representative for Federación Española de Tiro con Arco, the Spanish archery federation.

In 2006, Cuesta became the coach for the Real Federación Española de Tiro. In this role, she led the team to first-place finished at the 2010, 2008 and 2007 national team competition. In November 2011, she was named the national coordinator for adaptive archery by the national federation, replacing Antonio Rebollo who had held the post for three years. She made her debut in this position at the February 2012 Spanish Indoor Adaptive Archery National Championship. The competition also marked the start of her preparations for the national team at the Paralympic Games. She coached the national team in adaptive archery at 2012 Summer Paralympics. In early 2013, she had the final say in the national team selection for the 2013 IPC Archery World Championships that occurred in November 2013.
