= Mahtab Parsamehr =

Iranian archer (born 1989)

Personal information
- Born: February 20, 1989 (age 37) Tehran
Medal record
Women's compound archery
Representing Iran
World Championships
| Silver medal – second place | 2011 Turin | Team |
Asian Indoor Games
| Gold medal – first place | 2009 Hanoi | Team |
| Silver medal – second place | 2009 Hanoi | Individual |
Islamic Solidarity Games
| Silver medal – second place | 2013 Palembang | Team |
| Silver medal – second place | 2013 Palembang | Mixed team |

Mahtab Parsamehr (Persian: مهتاب پارسامهر, born February 20, 1989, in Tehran) is an Iranian archer.

== Career ==
Parsamehr started archery when she was 18 years old. After 1 year she got her first medal in Iran national Indoor championship and she invited to the Iran Archery National Team. She got 2 Medals in her first international competitions (Vietnam Asian Games 2009). She is the current World Archery number 352 in women's compound archery. The highest ranking she has reached is the third position, which she reached for the last time in April 2012.

== Palmares ==
2009

Asian indoor Games

(silver) individual Compound Women
(gold) Compound Women's Team, Vietnam

Asian Outdoor Championships

(bronze) Compound Women's Team, Bali

2010
(silver) World Cup, Compound women's Team, Antalya
(silver) World University Championships, Compound women's Team, Shenzhen
(silver) World University Championships, COMPOUND Mixed Team, Shenzhen

2011
(gold) World Cup, Compound Women individual, Antalya
(silver) World Cup, Compound Women's Team, Antalya
(silver) World Outdoor Championships, women's team, Turin
4th, World Outdoor Championships, individual, Turin
4th, World Outdoor Championships, mixed team, Turin
4th, World Outdoor Championships, Individual, Salt Lake City
6th, Summer Universiade, women's team, Shenzhen
9th, Summer Universiade, individual, Shenzhen
8th, World Cup Final, individual, Istanbul
4th, Asian Outdoor Championships, women's team, Tehran
9th, Asian Outdoor Championships, individual, Tehran

2014

3D GP, Kemer

(silver) Individual Compound Women

2017

GA State indoor Championships

(gold) Compound Women Individual, Georgia USA

GA State Field Archery championship

(silver) Compound Women Individual, Georgia USA

2018

50th US National indoor competitions

(silver) Compound Women Individual, Georgia USA

2019

GA Cup Competition

(silver) Compound Women Individual, Georgia USA
