= 2008 Archery World Cup =

International archery competition

The 2008 Archery World Cup was the 3rd edition of the international archery circuit, organised by the World Archery Federation. The best individual and mixed performers in each discipline over the three legs then joined host representatives in qualifying for the finals.

== Competition rules and scoring ==
The compound legs consisted of a 50m qualification round of 72 arrows, followed by the compound round at 50m on a 6-zone target face, using cumulative scoring for all individual, team and mixed competitions. The top four individual performers (with no more than two from each country) proceeded to the finals.

The recurve legs consisted of a FITA qualification round, followed by a 72m Olympic set system . The top seven individual performers (with no more than two from each country), plus one host nation representative if not already qualified, proceeded to the finals; the top mixed team performer proceeded to face the host nation at the finals, which were the same competition format as the legs. The team competition was not competed at the finals.

Competitors' top three scores go towards qualification. The scores awarded in the legs were as follows:

=== Individual scoring ===
| Position | Points |
|---|---|
| 1st place | 25 |
| 2nd place | 21 |
| 3rd place | 18 |
| 4th place | 15 |
| 5th place | 13 |
| 6th place | 12 |
| 7th place | 11 |
| 8th place | 10 |
| 9th–16th place | 5 |

== Calendar ==
| Stage | Location |
|---|---|
| 1 | Santo Domingo, Dominican Republic |
| 2 | Poreč, Croatia |
| 3 | Antalya Centennial Archery Field, Antalya, Turkey |
| 4 | Boé, France |
| Final | Lausanne, Switzerland |

== Results ==
=== Recurve ===
==== Men's individual ====
| Stage | Date | Location | 1st place, gold medalist(s) | 2nd place, silver medalist(s) | 3rd place, bronze medalist(s) | Ref. |
|---|---|---|---|---|---|---|
| 1 | 5 April | (Dominican Republic) Santo Domingo | (Italy) Ilario di Buo | (Chinese Taipei) Kuo Cheng-wei | (Russia) Baljinima Tsyrempilov | |
| 2 | 19 April | (Croatia) Poreč | (France) Romain Girouille | (India) Rahul Banerjee | (South Korea) Im Dong-hyun | |
| 3 | 31 May | (Turkey) Antalya | (South Korea) Im Dong-hyun | (United States) Brady Ellison | (South Korea) Park Kyung-mo | |
| 4 | 28 June | (France) Boé | (Ukraine) Viktor Ruban | (China) Li Wenquan | (South Korea) Park Kyung-mo | |
| Final | 27 September | (Switzerland) Lausanne | (South Korea) Im Dong-hyun | (Ukraine) Viktor Ruban | (France) Romain Girouille | |

==== Women's individual ====
| Stage | Date | Location | 1st place, gold medalist(s) | 2nd place, silver medalist(s) | 3rd place, bronze medalist(s) | Ref. |
|---|---|---|---|---|---|---|
| 1 | 5 April | (Dominican Republic) Santo Domingo | (Italy) Natalia Valeeva | (Russia) Natalya Erdyniyeva | (France) Bérengère Schuh | |
| 2 | 19 April | (Croatia) Poreč | (South Korea) Yun Ok-hee | (Poland) Justyna Mospinek | (South Korea) Park Sung-hyun | |
| 3 | 31 May | (Turkey) Antalya | (South Korea) Yun Ok-hee | (Ukraine) Victoriya Koval | (South Korea) Park Sung-hyun | |
| 4 | 28 June | (France) Boé | (South Korea) Park Sung-hyun | (South Korea) Yun Ok-hee | (China) Zhang Juanjuan | |
| Final | 27 September | (Switzerland) Lausanne | (Poland) Justyna Mospinek | (South Korea) Park Sung-hyun | (South Korea) Yun Ok-hee | |

==== Men's team ====
| Stage | Date | Location | 1st place, gold medalist(s) | 2nd place, silver medalist(s) | 3rd place, bronze medalist(s) | Ref. |
|---|---|---|---|---|---|---|
| 1 | 5 April | (Dominican Republic) Santo Domingo | Chinese Taipei | Australia | Italy | |
| 2 | 19 April | (Croatia) Poreč | Chinese Taipei | Italy | India | |
| 3 | 30 May | (Turkey) Antalya | India | Malaysia | Chinese Taipei | |
| 4 | 28 June | (France) Boé | South Korea | Malaysia | Russia | |

==== Women's team ====
| Stage | Date | Location | 1st place, gold medalist(s) | 2nd place, silver medalist(s) | 3rd place, bronze medalist(s) | Ref. |
|---|---|---|---|---|---|---|
| 1 | 5 April | (Dominican Republic) Santo Domingo | United Kingdom | Italy | Georgia | |
| 2 | 19 April | (Croatia) Poreč | China | Poland | South Korea | |
| 3 | 30 May | (Turkey) Antalya | South Korea | Chinese Taipei | China | |
| 4 | 28 June | (France) Boé | South Korea | Italy | United Kingdom | |

=== Compound ===
==== Men's individual ====
| Stage | Date | Location | 1st place, gold medalist(s) | 2nd place, silver medalist(s) | 3rd place, bronze medalist(s) | Ref. |
|---|---|---|---|---|---|---|
| 1 | 5 April | (Dominican Republic) Santo Domingo | (United States) Dave Cousins | (Australia) Robert Timms | (Australia) Patrick Coghlan | |
| 2 | 19 April | (Croatia) Poreč | (Italy) Sergio Pagni | (Brazil) Roberval dos Santos | (Canada) Dietmar Trillus | |
| 3 | 31 May | (Turkey) Antalya | (Italy) Sergio Pagni | (Slovenia) Dejan Sitar | (Netherlands) Peter Elzinga | |
| 4 | 28 June | (France) Boé | (Australia) Patrick Coghlan | (Canada) Kevin Tataryn | (Denmark) Martin Damsbo | |
| Final | 27 September | (Switzerland) Lausanne | (Canada) Dietmar Trillus | (Switzerland) Patrizio Hofer | (Australia) Patrick Coghlan | |

==== Women's individual ====
| Stage | Date | Location | 1st place, gold medalist(s) | 2nd place, silver medalist(s) | 3rd place, bronze medalist(s) | Ref. |
|---|---|---|---|---|---|---|
| 1 | 5 April | (Dominican Republic) Santo Domingo | (United States) Jamie van Natta | (Croatia) Ivana Buden | (Russia) Albina Loginova | |
| 2 | 19 April | (Croatia) Poreč | (France) Amandine Bouillot | (United Kingdom) Nichola Simpson | (United Kingdom) Andrea Gales | |
| 3 | 31 May | (Turkey) Antalya | (Italy) Eugenia Salvi | (United States) Jamie van Natta | (Croatia) Ivana Buden | |
| 4 | 28 June | (France) Boé | (Venezuela) Luzmary Guedez | (United Kingdom) Nichola Simpson | (United States) Jamie van Natta | |
| Final | 27 September | (Switzerland) Lausanne | (United States) Jamie van Natta | (United Kingdom) Nichola Simpson | (France) Amandine Bouillot | |

==== Men's team ====
| Stage | Date | Location | 1st place, gold medalist(s) | 2nd place, silver medalist(s) | 3rd place, bronze medalist(s) | Ref. |
|---|---|---|---|---|---|---|
| 1 | 5 April | (Dominican Republic) Santo Domingo | United States | Australia | Mexico | |
| 2 | 19 April | (Croatia) Poreč | Italy | Sweden | United Kingdom | |
| 3 | 30 May | (Turkey) Antalya | Italy | United States | Russia | |
| 4 | 28 June | (France) Boé | France | Australia | Canada | |

==== Women's team ====
| Stage | Date | Location | 1st place, gold medalist(s) | 2nd place, silver medalist(s) | 3rd place, bronze medalist(s) | Ref. |
|---|---|---|---|---|---|---|
| 1 | 5 April | (Dominican Republic) Santo Domingo | Russia | Germany | Mexico | |
| 2 | 19 April | (Croatia) Poreč | United Kingdom | France | Belgium | |
| 3 | 30 May | (Turkey) Antalya | Russia | United Kingdom | Venezuela | |
| 4 | 28 June | (France) Boé | France | Greece | Russia | |

== Medals table ==
| Rank | Nation | Gold | Silver | Bronze | Total |
|---|---|---|---|---|---|
| 1 | South Korea | 8 | 2 | 7 | 17 |
| 2 | Italy | 7 | 3 | 1 | 11 |
| 3 | United States | 4 | 3 | 1 | 8 |
| 4 | France | 4 | 1 | 3 | 8 |
| 5 | Great Britain | 2 | 4 | 3 | 9 |
| 6 | Chinese Taipei | 2 | 2 | 1 | 5 |
| 7 | Russia | 2 | 1 | 5 | 8 |
| 8 | Australia | 1 | 4 | 2 | 7 |
| 9 | Poland | 1 | 2 | 0 | 3 |
| 9 | Ukraine | 1 | 2 | 0 | 3 |
| 11 | Canada | 1 | 1 | 2 | 4 |
| 11 | China | 1 | 1 | 2 | 4 |
| 13 | India | 1 | 1 | 1 | 3 |
| 14 | Venezuela | 1 | 0 | 1 | 2 |
| 15 | Malaysia | 0 | 2 | 0 | 2 |
| 16 | Croatia | 0 | 1 | 1 | 2 |
| 17 | Brazil | 0 | 1 | 0 | 1 |
| 17 | Germany | 0 | 1 | 0 | 1 |
| 17 | Greece | 0 | 1 | 0 | 1 |
| 17 | Slovenia | 0 | 1 | 0 | 1 |
| 17 | Sweden | 0 | 1 | 0 | 1 |
| 17 | Switzerland | 0 | 1 | 0 | 1 |
| 23 | Mexico | 0 | 0 | 2 | 2 |
| 24 | Belgium | 0 | 0 | 1 | 1 |
| 24 | Denmark | 0 | 0 | 1 | 1 |
| 24 | Georgia | 0 | 0 | 1 | 1 |
| 24 | Netherlands | 0 | 0 | 1 | 1 |
| Totals (27 entries) | | 36 | 36 | 36 | 108 |

== Qualification ==
=== Recurve ===
==== Men's individual ====
| Pos. | Name | Points | (Dominican Republic) | (Croatia) | (Turkey) | (France) | |
|---|---|---|---|---|---|---|---|
| 1. | (South Korea) Park Kyung-mo | 51 | – | 15 | 18 | 18 | Q |
| 1. | (South Korea) Im Dong-hyun | 51 | – | 18 | 25 | 8 | Q |
| 3. | (Ukraine) Viktor Ruban | 42 | – | 12 | 5 | 25 | Q |
| 4. | (France) Romain Girouille | 39 | 13 | 25 | – | 1 | Q |
| 5. | (India) Jayanta Talukdar | 37 | 6 | 13 | 12 | 12 | |
| 6. | (India) Rahul Banerjee | 36 | – | 21 | 15 | – | |
| 7. | (Italy) Ilario di Buo | 31 | 25 | – | – | 6 | |
| 8. | (Australia) Kim Ha-neul | 26 | 2 | – | 12 | 12 | |
| 8. | (Chinese Taipei) Kuo Cheng-wei | 26 | 21 | – | 5 | – | |
| 10. | (China) Li Wenquan | 21 | – | – | – | 21 | |
| 10. | (United States) Brady Ellison | 21 | – | – | 21 | – | |

==== Women's individual ====
| Pos. | Name | Points | (Dominican Republic) | (Croatia) | (Turkey) | (France) | |
|---|---|---|---|---|---|---|---|
| 1. | (South Korea) Yun Ok-hee | 71 | – | 25 | 25 | 21 | Q |
| 2. | (South Korea) Park Sung-hyun | 61 | – | 18 | 18 | 25 | Q |
| 3. | (Italy) Natalia Valeeva | 53 | 25 | 15 | 13 | – | Q |
| 4. | (Poland) Justyna Mospinek | 37 | 8 | 21 | – | 8 | Q |
| 5. | (South Korea) Joo Hyun-jung | 35 | – | 13 | 11 | 11 | |
| 6. | (India) Bombayla Devi Laishram | 24 | 4 | 13 | 7 | – | |
| 7. | (Russia) Natalya Erdyniyeva | 23 | 21 | – | 2 | – | |
| 7. | (South Korea) Kwak Ye-ji | 23 | – | 8 | 15 | – | |
| 9. | (China) Zhang Juanjuan | 22 | – | 4 | – | 18 | |
| 9. | (France) Bérengère Schuh | 22 | 18 | – | – | 4 | |
| 9. | (Chinese Taipei) Wu Hui-ju | 22 | 10 | – | 12 | – | |

=== Compound ===
==== Men's individual ====
| Pos. | Name | Points | (Dominican Republic) | (Croatia) | (Turkey) | (France) | |
|---|---|---|---|---|---|---|---|
| 1. | (Italy) Sergio Pagni | 60 | – | 25 | 25 | 10 | Q |
| 2. | (Australia) Patrick Coghlan | 43 | 18 | – | – | 25 | Q |
| 3. | (Switzerland) Patrizio Hofer | 42 | 12 | – | 15 | 15 | Q |
| 4. | (Canada) Dietmar Trillus | 41 | 11 | 18 | 12 | – | Q |
| 5. | (Brazil) Roberval dos Santos | 35 | 10 | 21 | – | 4 | |
| 6. | (Netherlands) Peter Elzinga | 34 | – | 5 | 18 | 11 | |
| 7. | (United Kingdom) Liam Grimwood | 33 | 15 | 11 | 6 | 7 | |
| 8. | (Australia) Robert Timms | 32 | 21 | – | 11 | – | |
| 9. | (Denmark) Martin Damsbo | 30 | 5 | – | 7 | 18 | |
| 10. | (Canada) Kevin Tataryn | 29 | – | – | 8 | 21 | |
| 10. | (Slovenia) Dejan Sitar | 29 | – | – | 21 | 8 | |

==== Women's individual ====
| Pos. | Name | Points | (Dominican Republic) | (Croatia) | (Turkey) | (France) | |
|---|---|---|---|---|---|---|---|
| 1. | (United States) Jamie van Natta | 64 | 25 | 3 | 21 | 18 | Q |
| 2. | (Croatia) Ivana Buden | 51 | 21 | 12 | 18 | 7 | Q |
| 3. | (United Kingdom) Nichola Simpson | 47 | 3 | 21 | 5 | 21 | Q |
| 4. | (France) Amandine Bouillot | 43 | 15 | 25 | – | 3 | Q |
| 5. | (Russia) Anna Kazantseva | 39 | – | 12 | 12 | 15 | |
| 6. | (Italy) Eugenia Salvi | 37 | 7 | – | 25 | 5 | |
| 7. | (Venezuela) Luzmary Guedez | 35 | 10 | – | – | 25 | |
| 7. | (Russia) Sofia Goncharova | 35 | 13 | 2 | 10 | 12 | |
| 7. | (Denmark) Camilla Sømod | 35 | 12 | 8 | 15 | – | |
| 10. | (Russia) Albina Loginova | 33 | 18 | 7 | 7 | 8 | |

=== Nations ranking ===
| Pos. | Nation | Points | (Dominican Republic) | (Croatia) | (Turkey) | (France) |
|---|---|---|---|---|---|---|
| 1. | South Korea | 454 | – | 131 | 160 | 163 |
| 2. | Italy | 430 | 121 | 125 | 123 | 61 |
| 3. | United Kingdom | 397 | 102 | 157 | 56 | 82 |
| 4. | Russia | 364 | 119 | 52 | 106 | 87 |
| 5. | France | 330 | 74 | 140 | – | 116 |
| 6. | India | 257 | 70 | 91 | 84 | 12 |
| 7. | Australia | 236 | 118 | 20 | 29 | 69 |
| 8. | Chinese Taipei | 233 | 83 | 57 | 93 | – |
| 9. | United States | 208 | 90 | 3 | 80 | 35 |
| 10. | China | 170 | – | 55 | 26 | 89 |

== World Cup Final ==
=== Recurve ===
==== Men's individual ====
Semifinals
1 | (South Korea) Im Dong-hyun | 108
4 | (France) Romain Girouille | 105
3 | (Ukraine) Viktor Ruban | 109
2 | (South Korea) Park Kyung-mo | 108

Finals
1 | (South Korea) Im Dong-hyun | 112
3 | (Ukraine) Viktor Ruban | 110
Third place
4 | (France) Romain Girouille | 109^{9}
2 | (South Korea) Park Kyung-mo | 109^{8}

==== Women's individual ====
Semifinals
1 | (South Korea) Yun Ok-hee | 110
4 | (Poland) Justyna Mospinek | 111
3 | (Italy) Natalia Valeeva | 103
2 | (South Korea) Park Sung-hyun | 107

Finals
4 | (Poland) Justyna Mospinek | 109
2 | (South Korea) Park Sung-hyun | 107
Third place
1 | (South Korea) Yun Ok-hee | 113
3 | (Italy) Natalia Valeeva | 105

=== Compound ===
==== Men's individual ====
Semifinals
1 | (Italy) Sergio Pagni | 114^{9}
4 | (Canada) Dietmar Trillus | 114^{10}
3 | (Switzerland) Patrizio Hofer | 114
2 | (Australia) Patrick Coghlan | 113

Finals
4 | (Canada) Dietmar Trillus | 112^{10}
3 | (Switzerland) Patrizio Hofer | 112^{9}
Third place
1 | (Italy) Sergio Pagni | 115^{9}
2 | (Australia) Patrick Coghlan | 115^{10}

==== Women's individual ====
Semifinals
1 | (United States) Jamie van Natta | 108^{10}
4 | (France) Amandine Bouillot | 108^{8}
3 | (United Kingdom) Nichola Simpson | 116
2 | (Croatia) Ivana Buden | 108

Finals
1 | (United States) Jamie van Natta | 114
3 | (United Kingdom) Nichola Simpson | 112
Third place
4 | (France) Amandine Bouillot | 114
2 | (Croatia) Ivana Buden | 110
