= 2009 Archery World Cup =

International archery competition

The 2009 Archery World Cup was the 4th edition of the international archery circuit, organised by the World Archery Federation. The best individual and mixed performers in each discipline over the three legs then joined host representatives in qualifying for the finals.

This was the first edition of the world cup where the mixed team events were contested at the final, with the top ranked mixed teams competing against a host country team in a one match final.

== Competition rules and scoring ==
The compound legs consisted of a 50m qualification round of 72 arrows, followed by the compound round at 50m on a 6-zone target face, using cumulative scoring for all individual, team and mixed competitions. The top four individual performers (with no more than two from each country) proceeded to the finals.

The recurve legs consisted of a FITA qualification round, followed by a 72m Olympic set system . The top seven individual performers (with no more than two from each country), plus one host nation representative if not already qualified, proceeded to the finals; the top mixed team performer proceeded to face the host nation at the finals, which were the same competition format as the legs. The team competition was not competed at the finals.

Competitors' top three scores go towards qualification. The scores awarded in the legs were as follows:

=== Individual scoring ===
Position	Points
1st place	25
2nd place	21
3rd place	18
4th place	15
5th place	13
6th place	12
7th place	11
8th place	10
9th–16th place	5

=== Mixed team scoring ===
Position	Points
1st place	16
2nd place	12
3rd place	10
4th place	8
5th place	4
6th place	3
7th place	2
8th place	1

== Calendar ==
Stage	Location
1	Santo Domingo, Dominican Republic
2	Poreč, Croatia
3	Antalya Centennial Archery Field, Antalya, Turkey
4	Shanghai, China
Final	Copenhagen, Denmark

== Results ==
=== Recurve ===
==== Men's individual ====
Stage	Date	Location	1st place, gold medalist(s)	2nd place, silver medalist(s)	3rd place, bronze medalist(s)	Ref.
1	5 April	(Dominican Republic) Santo Domingo	(France) Romain Girouille	(Canada) Crispin Duenas	(United Kingdom) Simon Terry	
2	9 May	(Croatia) Poreč	(India) Jayanta Talukdar	(Italy) Marco Galiazzo	(France) Jean-Charles Valladont	
3	7 June	(Turkey) Antalya	(United Kingdom) Simon Terry	(France) Thomas Aubert	(India) Jayanta Talukdar	
4	9 August	(China) Shanghai	(China) Chen Wenyuan	(South Korea) Oh Jin-hyek	(South Korea) Im Dong-hyun	
Final	26 September	(Denmark) Copenhagen	(Italy) Marco Galiazzo	(United Kingdom) Simon Terry	(France) Romain Girouille	

==== Women's individual ====
Stage	Date	Location	1st place, gold medalist(s)	2nd place, silver medalist(s)	3rd place, bronze medalist(s)	Ref.
1	5 April	(Dominican Republic) Santo Domingo	(Italy) Natalia Valeeva	(United Kingdom) Alison Williamson	(India) Dola Banerjee	
2	9 May	(Croatia) Poreč	(China) Zhao Ling	(Italy) Pia Carmen Lionetti	(Germany) Susanne Possner	
3	7 June	(Turkey) Antalya	(South Korea) Kwak Ye-ji	(South Korea) Yun Ok-hee	(South Korea) Joo Hyun-jung	
4	9 August	(China) Shanghai	(South Korea) Yun Ok-hee	(France) Bérengère Schuh	(South Korea) Kwak Ye-ji	
Final	26 September	(Denmark) Copenhagen	(South Korea) Kwak Ye-ji	(China) Zhao Ling	(South Korea) Yun Ok-hee	

==== Men's team ====
Stage	Date	Location	1st place, gold medalist(s)	2nd place, silver medalist(s)	3rd place, bronze medalist(s)	Ref.
1	5 April	(Dominican Republic) Santo Domingo	India	United Kingdom	United States	
2	9 May	(Croatia) Poreč	India	Russia	Italy	
3	6 June	(Turkey) Antalya	South Korea	India	Malaysia	
4	9 August	(China) Shanghai	South Korea	France	Mexico	

==== Women's team ====
Stage	Date	Location	1st place, gold medalist(s)	2nd place, silver medalist(s)	3rd place, bronze medalist(s)	Ref.
1	5 April	(Dominican Republic) Santo Domingo	Italy	Poland	United Kingdom	
2	9 May	(Croatia) Poreč	China	France	Ukraine	
3	6 June	(Turkey) Antalya	South Korea	Russia	India	
4	9 August	(China) Shanghai	South Korea	Russia	Italy	

==== Mixed team ====
Stage	Date	Location	1st place, gold medalist(s)	2nd place, silver medalist(s)	3rd place, bronze medalist(s)	Ref.
1	5 April	(Dominican Republic) Santo Domingo	Italy	Poland	France	
2	9 May	(Croatia) Poreč	Italy	Poland	China	
3	7 June	(Turkey) Antalya	China	South Korea	Russia	
4	9 August	(China) Shanghai	South Korea	China	France	
Final	26 September	(Denmark) Copenhagen	China	Denmark	—N/a	

=== Compound ===
==== Men's individual ====
Stage	Date	Location	1st place, gold medalist(s)	2nd place, silver medalist(s)	3rd place, bronze medalist(s)	Ref.
1	5 April	(Dominican Republic) Santo Domingo	(United States) Braden Gellenthien	(Switzerland) Patrizio Hofer	(Netherlands) Peter Elzinga	
2	9 May	(Croatia) Poreč	(Italy) Sergio Pagni	(El Salvador) Jorge Jiménez	(Germany) Paul Titscher	
3	7 June	(Turkey) Antalya	(France) Dominique Genet	(United States) Braden Gellenthien	(Australia) Patrick Coghlan	
4	9 August	(China) Shanghai	(Italy) Sergio Pagni	(El Salvador) Jorge Jiménez	(Switzerland) Patrizio Hofer	
Final	26 September	(Denmark) Copenhagen	(Italy) Sergio Pagni	(United States) Braden Gellenthien	(Switzerland) Patrizio Hofer	

==== Women's individual ====
Stage	Date	Location	1st place, gold medalist(s)	2nd place, silver medalist(s)	3rd place, bronze medalist(s)	Ref.
1	5 April	(Dominican Republic) Santo Domingo	(United States) Brittany Lorenti	(United States) Jamie van Natta	(United States) Diane Watson	
2	9 May	(Croatia) Poreč	(United Kingdom) Nicky Hunt	(Croatia) Ivana Buden	(Germany) Andrea Weihe	
3	7 June	(Turkey) Antalya	(Venezuela) Luzmary Guedez	(Venezuela) Olga Bosch	(Denmark) Camilla Sømod	
4	9 August	(China) Shanghai	(Denmark) Camilla Sømod	(Italy) Anastasia Anastasio	(Russia) Albina Loginova	
Final	26 September	(Denmark) Copenhagen	(Venezuela) Luzmary Guedez	(Denmark) Camilla Sømod	(Croatia) Ivana Buden	

==== Men's team ====
Stage	Date	Location	1st place, gold medalist(s)	2nd place, silver medalist(s)	3rd place, bronze medalist(s)	Ref.
1	5 April	(Dominican Republic) Santo Domingo	United States	Canada	El Salvador	
2	9 May	(Croatia) Poreč	Sweden	Italy	Denmark	
3	6 June	(Turkey) Antalya	Netherlands	Sweden	Canada	
4	9 August	(China) Shanghai	Mexico	New Zealand	South Africa	

==== Women's team ====
Stage	Date	Location	1st place, gold medalist(s)	2nd place, silver medalist(s)	3rd place, bronze medalist(s)	Ref.
1	5 April	(Dominican Republic) Santo Domingo	United States	Mexico	India	
2	9 May	(Croatia) Poreč	Russia	Germany	Netherlands	
3	6 June	(Turkey) Antalya	New Zealand	Greece	Australia	
4	9 August	(China) Shanghai	Russia	Mexico	France	

==== Mixed team ====
Stage	Date	Location	1st place, gold medalist(s)	2nd place, silver medalist(s)	3rd place, bronze medalist(s)	Ref.
1	5 April	(Dominican Republic) Santo Domingo	Denmark	Mexico	United States	
2	9 May	(Croatia) Poreč	Italy	United States	France	
3	7 June	(Turkey) Antalya	Italy	Australia	United Kingdom	
4	9 August	(China) Shanghai	Denmark	Mexico	Italy	
Final	26 September	(Denmark) Copenhagen	Denmark	Italy	—N/a	

== Medals table ==
Rank	Nation	Gold	Silver	Bronze	Total
1	Italy	10	5	3	18
2	South Korea	8	3	4	15
3	China	5	2	1	8
4	United States	4	4	3	11
5	Denmark	4	2	2	8
6	India	3	1	4	8
7	France	2	4	6	12
8	Great Britain	2	3	3	8
9	Russia	2	3	2	7
10	Venezuela	2	1	0	3
11	Mexico	1	4	1	6
12	New Zealand	1	1	0	2
12	Sweden	1	1	0	2
14	Netherlands	1	0	2	3
15	Poland	0	3	0	3
16	Canada	0	2	1	3
16	El Salvador	0	2	1	3
18	Germany	0	1	3	4
19	Australia	0	1	2	3
19	Switzerland	0	1	2	3
21	Croatia	0	1	1	2
22	Greece	0	1	0	1
23	Malaysia	0	0	1	1
23	South Africa	0	0	1	1
23	Ukraine	0	0	1	1
Totals (25 entries)		46	46	44	136

== Qualification ==
=== Recurve ===
==== Men's individual ====
Pos.	Name	Points	(Dominican Republic)	(Croatia)	(Turkey)	(China)	
1.	(India) Jayanta Talukdar	45	2	25	18	2	Q
2.	(United Kingdom) Simon Terry	43	18	–	25	–	Q
3.	(France) Romain Girouille	36	25	–	–	11	Q
3.	(Italy) Marco Galiazzo	36	15	21	–	–	Q
5.	(South Korea) Oh Jin-hyek	34	–	–	13	21	
6.	(Malaysia) Chu Sian Cheng	27	–	12	–	15	
7.	(Russia) Bair Badenov	26	–	1	12	13	
8.	(Canada) Crispin Duenas	25	21	–	–	4	
8.	(China) Chen Wenyuan	25	–	–	–	25	
10.	(United States) Brady Ellison	23	–	15	8	–	

==== Women's individual ====
Pos.	Name	Points	(Dominican Republic)	(Croatia)	(Turkey)	(China)	
1.	(France) Bérengère Schuh	49	7	15	13	21	Q
2.	(South Korea) Yun Ok-hee	46	–	–	21	25	Q
3.	(South Korea) Kwak Ye-ji	43	–	–	25	18	Q
4.	(China) Zhao Ling	40	–	25	–	15	Q
5.	(Italy) Natalia Valeeva	36	25	1	5	6	
6.	(South Korea) Joo Hyun-jung	31	–	–	18	13	
7.	(Italy) Pia Carmen Lionetti	29	–	21	–	8	
8.	(United Kingdom) Alison Williamson	21	21	–	–	–	
9.	(Italy) Elena Tonetta	20	12	8	–	–	
10.	(India) Dola Banerjee	18	18	–	–	–	
10.	(Germany) Susanne Possner	18	–	18	–	–	

==== Mixed team ====
Pos.	Team	Points	(Dominican Republic)	(Croatia)	(Turkey)	(China)	
1.	China	38	–	10	16	12	Q
2.	Italy	32	16	16	–	–	
3.	South Korea	28	–	–	12	16	
4.	Poland	24	12	12	–	–	
4.	India	24	8	–	8	8	

=== Compound ===
==== Men's individual ====
Pos.	Name	Points	(Dominican Republic)	(Croatia)	(Turkey)	(China)	
1.	(Italy) Sergio Pagni	50	–	25	–	25	Q
2.	(United States) Braden Gellenthien	46	25	–	21	–	Q
3.	(El Salvador) Jorge Jiménez	42	–	21	–	21	Q
4.	(Switzerland) Patrizio Hofer	39	21	–	–	18	Q
5.	(Netherlands) Peter Elzinga	35	18	–	10	7	
5.	(Canada) Dietmar Trillus	35	10	13	6	12	
7.	(Australia) Patrick Coghlan	34	–	3	18	13	
8.	(Denmark) Martin Damsbo	30	13	–	13	4	
9.	(France) Sebastien Brasseur	26	–	11	15	–	
10.	(France) Dominique Genet	25	–	–	25	–	

==== Women's individual ====
Pos.	Name	Points	(Dominican Republic)	(Croatia)	(Turkey)	(China)	
1.	(United Kingdom) Nicky Hunt	51	–	25	13	13	Q
2.	(Denmark) Camilla Sømod	50	5	7	18	25	Q
3.	(Croatia) Ivana Buden	49	13	21	15	1	Q
3.	(Venezuela) Luzmary Guedez	49	11	4	25	13	Q
3.	(Venezuela) Olga Bosch	49	15	13	21	5	
6.	(Italy) Anastasia Anastasio	48	–	15	12	21	
7.	(Russia) Albina Loginova	39	–	13	8	8	
7.	(United States) Jamie van Natta	39	21	10	8	–	
9.	(United States) Brittany Lorenti	25	25	–	–	–	
10.	(Italy) Eugenia Salvi	24	5	8	11	–	

==== Mixed team ====
Pos.	Team	Points	(Dominican Republic)	(Croatia)	(Turkey)	(China)	
1.	Italy	42	8	16	16	10	Q
2.	Denmark	40	16	8	–	16	Q^{1}
3.	United States	30	10	12	8	–	
4.	Mexico	24	12	–	–	12	
5.	Australia	12	–	–	12	–	

^{1.} Qualified for final as host

=== Nations ranking ===
Pos.	Nation	Points	(Dominican Republic)	(Croatia)	(Turkey)	(China)
1.	Italy	545	121	222	105	97
2.	India	437	180	124	107	26
3.	South Korea	372	–	–	169	203
4.	Russia	360	–	106	79	175
5.	France	343	42	105	82	114
6.	United States	321	231	45	45	–
7.	Mexico	296	139	–	–	157
8.	China	227	–	118	37	72
9.	United Kingdom	218	110	28	55	25
10.	Canada	156	71	18	46	21

== World Cup Final ==
=== Recurve ===
==== Men's individual ====
Semifinals
1	(India) Jayanta Talukdar	103
4	(Italy) Marco Galiazzo	111
3	(France) Romain Girouille	108
2	(United Kingdom) Simon Terry	112

Finals
4	(Italy) Marco Galiazzo	108
2	(United Kingdom) Simon Terry	105
Third place
1	(India) Jayanta Talukdar	110
3	(France) Romain Girouille	113

==== Women's individual ====
Semifinals
1	(France) Bérengère Schuh	108
4	(China) Zhao Ling	109
3	(South Korea) Kwak Ye-ji	114
2	(South Korea) Yun Ok-hee	111

Finals
4	(China) Zhao Ling	108
3	(South Korea) Kwak Ye-ji	113
Third place
1	(France) Bérengère Schuh	106
2	(South Korea) Yun Ok-hee	111

==== Mixed team ====
Finals
1	China; Zhao Ling; Xing Yu	145
2	Denmark; Carina Christiansen; Morten Caspersen	138

=== Compound ===
==== Men's individual ====
Semifinals
1	(Italy) Sergio Pagni	117
4	(Switzerland) Patrizio Hofer	112
3	(El Salvador) Jorge Jiménez	114
2	(United States) Braden Gellenthien	120*

Finals
1	(Italy) Sergio Pagni	115
2	(United States) Braden Gellenthien	114
Third place
4	(Switzerland) Patrizio Hofer	118
3	(El Salvador) Jorge Jiménez	115

* New world record

==== Women's individual ====
Semifinals
1	(United Kingdom) Nicky Hunt	107
4	(Venezuela) Luzmary Guedez	109
3	(Croatia) Ivana Buden	112
2	(Denmark) Camilla Sømod	113

Finals
4	(Venezuela) Luzmary Guedez	108
2	(Denmark) Camilla Sømod	107
Third place
1	(United Kingdom) Nicky Hunt	111
3	(Croatia) Ivana Buden	115

==== Mixed team ====
Finals
1	Denmark; Camilla Sømod; Martin Damsbo	152
2	Italy; Anastasia Anastasio; Sergio Pagni	148
