= 2008 European Indoor Archery Championships =

- Venue: Oval Lingotto
- Location: Italy, Turin
- Start date: 3 March
- End date: 8 March
- Competitors: 284 from 34 nations

The XI European and Mediterranean Indoor Archery Championships were held in Turin, Italy from March 3 to 8, 2008.

== Schedule ==
- 3 March 2008 – Delegation arrival, accreditation
- 4 March 2008 – Accreditation, Free shooting, opening ceremony
- 5 March 2008 – Qualification round
- 6 March 2008 – Elimination round
- 7 March 2008 – Juniors semifinals and finals, prize ceremony
- 8 March 2008 – Seniors semifinals and finals, prize ceremony, closing ceremony

== Medal table ==
* Host nation (Italy)

Rank	Nation	Gold	Silver	Bronze	Total
1	Italy*	5	3	4	12
2	France	4	0	0	4
3	Ukraine	2	3	2	7
4	Russia	2	2	2	6
5	Netherlands	1	1	0	2
6	Spain	1	0	0	1
7	Switzerland	0	2	1	3
8	Belgium	0	1	0	1
8	Finland	0	1	0	1
8	Germany	0	1	0	1
8	Poland	0	1	0	1
12	Great Britain	0	0	3	3
13	Czech Republic	0	0	1	1
13	Sweden	0	0	1	1
13	Turkey	0	0	1	1
Totals (15 entries)		15	15	15	45

== Medal summary ==
=== Men ===
Event	Gold	Silver	Bronze
Compound individual	Sergio Pagni (ITA)	Peter Elzinga (NED)	Patrizio Hofer (SUI)
Compound team	Peter Elzinga; Rob Polman; Emiel Custers; Netherlands	Marko Järvenpää; Jari Haavisto; Aulis Humaljoki; Finland	Morgan Lundin; Anders Malm; Carl Henrik Gidelnskold; Sweden
Recurve individual	Marco Galiazzo (ITA)	Bair Badënov (RUS)	Oleksandr Drutsul (UKR)
Recurve team	Olivier Tavernier; Damien Pigeaud; Jocelyn de Grandis; France	Sebastian Rohrberg; Florian Floto; Jan Christopher Ginzel; Germany	Vedat Erbay; Yusuf Ergin; Tunc Kucukkayalar; Turkey

=== Women ===
Event	Gold	Silver	Bronze
Compound individual	Laura Longo (ITA)	Sofia Goncharova (RUS)	Nicky Hunt (GBR)
Compound Team	Albina Loginova; Svetlana Novikova; Sofia Goncharova; Russia	Laura Longo; Eugenia Salvi; Paola Galletti; Italy	Nichola Simpson; Nicky Hunt; Lucy Holderness; United Kingdom
Recurve individual	Tetyana Dorokhova (UKR)	Yuliya Lobzhenidze (UKR)	Elena Tonetta (ITA)
Recurve Team	Natalya Erdynieva; Ekaterina Kharkhanova; Sanzhi Obodoeva; Russia	Tetyana Dorokhova; Kateryna Palekha; Yuliya Lobzhenidze; Ukraine	Naomi Folkard; Charlotte Burgess; Emma Downie; United Kingdom

== Participating nations ==
- Austria (2)
- Belgium (5)
- Belarus (6)
- Bulgaria (3)
- Croatia (6)
- Czech Republic (2)
- Denmark (4)
- Spain (8)
- Finland (7)
- France (4)
- United Kingdom (12)
- Georgia (2)
- Germany (6)
- Greece (12)
- Israel (1)
- Italy (12)
- Latvia (1)
- Lebanon (2)
- Lithuania (3)
- Luxembourg (1)
- Moldova (1)
- Netherlands (9)
- Norway (4)
- Poland (12)
- Portugal (1)
- Romania (6)
- Russia (12)
- Serbia (3)
- Slovenia (6)
- San Marino (2)
- Switzerland (5)
- Sweden (3)
- Turkey (9)
- Ukraine (6)
