= 2007 World Archery Championships – Men's team compound =

The men's team compound competition at the 2007 World Archery Championships took place from July 2007 in Leipzig, Germany. 40 teams of 3 archers took part in the men's compound qualification round, and the 16 teams with the highest cumulative totals qualified for the 4-round knockout round, drawn according to their qualification round scores. The semi-finals and finals then took place on 14 July.

== Seeds ==
Seedings were based on the combined total of the team members' qualification scores in the individual ranking rounds. The top 16 teams were assigned places in the draw depending on their overall ranking.

1. (United States) Braden Gellenthien / Reo Wilde / Rodger Willett Jr. (champions)
2. (Australia) Patrick Coghlan / Clint Freeman / Robert Timms (2nd place)
3. (Netherlands) Emiel Custers / Peter Elzinga / Fred van Zutphen (quarterfinal)
4. (France) Jean Marc Beaud / Sebastien Brasseur / Dominique Genet (quarterfinal)
5. (Sweden) Fredrik Lindblad / Morgan Lundin / Anders Malm (3rd place)
6. (Spain) Jose Duo / Cesar Gomez / Jose Jerez (4th place)
7. (Iran) Majid Ahmadi / Parviz Sadeghimeybody / Reza Zamaninejad (1st round)
8. (Norway) Morten Boe / Freddy Borgersen / Mats-Inge Smordal (quarterfinal)
9. (United Kingdom) James Forbes / Liam Grimwood / Chris White (1st round)
10. (Canada) Kevin Brayford / Kevin Tataryn / Dietmar Trillus (quarterfinal)
11. (Denmark) Martin Damsbo / Erik P. Nielsen / Henrik Rasmussen (1st round)
12. (Italy) Daniele Bauro / Herian Boccali / Sergio Pagni (1st round)
13. (South Africa) Gabriel Badenhorst / Seppie Cilliers / Wesley Gates (1st round)
14. (Finland) Jari Haavisto / Nico Haavisto / Marko Jarvenpaa (1st round)
15. (Russia) Danzan Khaludorov / Bulat Shalanov / Vladimir Silakov (1st round)
16. (Germany) Michael Bassler / Lars Klingner / Paul Titscher (1st round)

== Draw ==
1st round
1	United States	228
16	Germany	219
9	United Kingdom	222
8	Norway	224
5	Sweden	229
12	Italy	228
13	South Africa	225
4	France	229
3	Netherlands	225
14	Finland	224
11	Denmark	223^{27}
6	Spain	223^{28}
7	Iran	221
10	Canada	228
15	Russia	223
2	Australia	233

Quarterfinals
1	United States	233
8	Norway	221
5	Sweden	227^{29}
4	France	227^{27}
3	Netherlands	222
6	Spain	225
10	Canada	228
2	Australia	232

Semifinals
1	United States	232
5	Sweden	229
6	Spain	224^{27}
2	Australia	224^{28}

Finals
1	United States	232
2	Australia	231
Third place
5	Sweden	226
6	Spain	223
