= 2010 European Archery Championships =

2010 European Championships
- Location: Rovereto, Italy
- Dates: 25-29 May 2010

The 2010 European Archery Championships is the 21st edition of the European Archery Championships. The event was held in Rovereto, Italy from 25 to 29 May, 2010. It was the first time at the championships that a mixed competition was held.

== Medal table ==
* Host nation (Italy)

| Rank | Nation | Gold | Silver | Bronze | Total |
|---|---|---|---|---|---|
| 1 | Russia | 4 | 1 | 2 | 7 |
| 2 | Italy | 1 | 4 | 2 | 7 |
| 3 | Belgium | 1 | 1 | 0 | 2 |
| 3 | Germany | 1 | 1 | 0 | 2 |
| 5 | Great Britain | 1 | 0 | 1 | 2 |
| 6 | France | 1 | 0 | 0 | 1 |
| 6 | Sweden | 1 | 0 | 0 | 1 |
| 8 | Netherlands | 0 | 1 | 1 | 2 |
| 9 | Denmark | 0 | 1 | 0 | 1 |
| 9 | Spain | 0 | 1 | 0 | 1 |
| 11 | Finland | 0 | 0 | 1 | 1 |
| 11 | Slovenia | 0 | 0 | 1 | 1 |
| 11 | Turkey | 0 | 0 | 1 | 1 |
| 11 | Ukraine | 0 | 0 | 1 | 1 |
| Totals (14 entries) | | 10 | 10 | 10 | 30 |

== Medal summary ==
=== Recurve ===
| Event | Gold | Silver | Bronze |
|---|---|---|---|
| Men's individual | France; Romain Girouille | Italy; Michele Frangilli | Ukraine; Markiyan Ivashko |
| Women's individual | Russia; Natalia Erdyniyeva | Russia; Inna Stepanova | Turkey; Begünhan Elif Ünsal |
| Men's team | Germany; Sebastian Rohrberg; Florian Floto; Rafael Poppenborg | Italy; Michele Frangilli; Marco Galiazzo; Ilario Di Buò | Finland; Matti Hatava; Antti Tekoniemi; Antti Mansukoski |
| Women's team | Russia; Natalia Erdyniyeva; Inna Stepanova; Ksenia Perova | Spain; Magali Foulon; Gema Buitrón; Helena Fernández | Italy; Natalia Valeeva; Jessica Tomasi; Pia Carmen Lionetti |
| Mixed Team | Italy; Natalia Valeeva; Marco Galiazzo | Germany; Elena Richter; Sebastian Rohrberg | United Kingdom; Charlotte Burgess; Simon Terry |

=== Compound ===
| Event | Gold | Silver | Bronze |
|---|---|---|---|
| Men's individual | United Kingdom; Andrew Rikunenko | Italy; Sergio Pagni | Netherlands; Peter Elzinga |
| Women's individual | Russia; Viktoria Balzhanova | Belgium; Gladys Willems | Russia; Albina Loginova |
| Men's team | Russia; Alexander Dambaev; Danzan Jaludorov; Denis Segin | Netherlands; Rob Polman; Peter Elzinga; Fred van Zutphen | Italy; Sergio Pagni; Pietro Greco; Antonio Tosco |
| Women's team | Belgium; Gladys Willems; Sarah Prieels; Michele Massina | Italy; Anastasia Anastasio; Eugenia Salvi; Laura Longo | Russia; Viktoria Balzhanova; Albina Loginova; Diana Tontoyeva |
| Mixed Team | Sweden; Isabell Danielsson; Anders Malm | Denmark; Camilla Sømod; Martin Damsbo | Slovenia; Maja Marcen; Dejan Sitar |
