= 2009 World Archery Championships – Men's team compound =

The men's team compound competition at the 2009 World Archery Championships took place on 2–8 September 2009 in Ulsan, South Korea. 29 teams of 3 archers took part in the men's compound qualification round on 1 September. The 16 teams with the highest cumulative totals qualified for the 4-round knockout round on 7 September which was drawn according to their qualification round scores. The semi-finals and finals then took place on 8 September.

Top seeds United States defeated Russia in the final.

== Seeds ==
Seedings were based on the combined total of the team members' qualification scores in the individual ranking rounds. The top 16 teams were assigned places in the draw depending on their overall ranking.

1. (United States) Dave Cousins / Braden Gellenthien / Reo Wilde (champions)
2. (Russia) Vladimir Fedosov / Danzan Khaludorov / Anton Khlyschenko (2nd place)
3. (El Salvador) Rigoberto Hernandez / Roberto Hernández / Jorge Jiménez (3rd place)
4. (New Zealand) Stephen Clifton / Trevor Irvine / Shaun Teasdale (1st round)
5. (France) Sebastien Brasseur / Pierre-Julien Deloche / Dominique Genet (1st round)
6. (Germany) Marcus Laube / Julian Scriba / Paul Titscher (quarterfinal)
7. (Mexico) Jaime Hafid / Ruben Ochoa / Angel Ramirez (quarterfinal)
8. (United Kingdom) Duncan Busby / James Forbes / Liam Grimwood (quarterfinal)
9. (Australia) Dennis Carson / Patrick Coghlan / Brendan Wallace (1st round)
10. (Brazil) Alexandre Augusto Cesar / Roberval dos Santos / Marcelo Roriz Jr. (1st round)
11. (Netherlands) Peter Elzinga / Rob Polman / Fred van Zutphen (1st round)
12. (Canada) Benny Parenteau / Kevin Tataryn / Dietmar Trillus (quarterfinal)
13. (Finland) Jari Haavisto / Marko Jarvenpaa / Timo Kivimaa (4th place)
14. (Italy) Herian Boccali / Stefano Mazzi / Sergio Pagni (1st round)
15. (Spain) Jose Ignacio Catalan / Luis Miguel De La Torre / Jose Duo (1st round)
16. (South Africa) Nico Benade / Seppie Cilliers / Wesley Gates (1st round)

== Draw ==
1st round
1	United States	235
16	South Africa	225
9	Australia	225
8	United Kingdom	230
5	France	226^{27}
12	Canada	226^{28}
13	Finland	226
4	New Zealand	225
3	El Salvador	230
14	Italy	226
11	Netherlands	220
6	Germany	223
7	Mexico	221
10	Brazil	220
15	Spain	225
2	Russia	230

Quarterfinals
1	United States	236
8	United Kingdom	230
12	Canada	224
13	Finland	227
3	El Salvador	230
6	Germany	229
7	Mexico	230
2	Russia	233

Semifinals
1	United States	236
13	Finland	223
3	El Salvador	225
2	Russia	231

Finals
1	United States	232
2	Russia	223
Third place
13	Finland	221
3	El Salvador	224
