= 2007 World Archery Championships – Women's individual compound =

The women's individual compound competition at the 2007 World Archery Championships took place in July 2007 in Leipzig, Germany. 73 archers entered the competition. Following a qualifying FITA round, the archers were placed into a 7-round knockout round, drawn according to their qualification round scores, with the top 55 qualifiers receiving a bye to the second round. The semi-finals and finals then took place on 15 July.

== Qualifying ==
The following archers were the leading 16 qualifiers:

1. (United States) Erika Anschutz (4th round)
2. (United States) Jamie van Natta (4th round)
3. (Sweden) Petra Ericsson (4th round)
4. (Philippines) Jennifer Dy Chan (Quarterfinal)
5. (Russia) Albina Loginova (2nd place)
6. (Sweden) Ingrid Olofsson (2nd round)
7. (Denmark) Camilla Sømod (4th round)
8. (France) Amandine Bouillot (3rd place)
9. (France) Valerie Fabre (4th round)
10. (Belgium) Gladys Willems (3rd round)
11. (Italy) Eugenia Salvi (Champion)
12. (Slovenia) Maja Marcen (3rd round)
13. (Japan) Hiroko Taniguchi (2nd round)
14. (Germany) Andrea Weihe (3rd round)
15. (Russia) Anna Kazantseva (Quarterfinal)
16. (Mexico) Almendra Ochoa (3rd round)

== Finals ==
Quarterfinals
17	(South Korea) Seo Jung-hee	112
8	(France) Amandine Bouillot	113
5	(Russia) Albina Loginova	112
4	(Philippines) Jennifer Dy Chan	111
19	(Croatia) Ivana Buden	112
11	(Italy) Eugenia Salvi	113
23	(Netherlands) Irina Markovic	112
15	(Russia) Anna Kazantseva	109

Semifinals
8	(France) Amandine Bouillot	109
5	(Russia) Albina Loginova	114
11	(Italy) Eugenia Salvi	112
23	(Netherlands) Irina Markovic	108

Finals
5	(Russia) Albina Loginova	107
11	(Italy) Eugenia Salvi	111
Third place
8	(France) Amandine Bouillot	114^{10}
23	(Netherlands) Irina Markovic	114^{9}
