= 2010 European Indoor Archery Championships =

2010 European Indoor Championships
- Location: Poreč, Croatia
- Dates: 16–20 March 2010

The 2010 European Indoor Archery Championships was the 12th edition of the European Indoor Archery Championships. The event was held in Poreč, Croatia from 16 to 20 March 2010.

== Medal table ==
* Host nation (Croatia)

Rank	Nation	Gold	Silver	Bronze	Total
1	Italy	3	4	0	7
2	Ukraine	1	1	1	3
3	Croatia*	1	1	0	2
4	France	1	0	1	2
5	Germany	1	0	0	1
5	Poland	1	0	0	1
7	Netherlands	0	1	1	2
8	Norway	0	1	0	1
9	Russia	0	0	3	3
10	Denmark	0	0	1	1
10	Georgia	0	0	1	1
Totals (11 entries)		8	8	8	24

== Medal summary ==
=== Recurve ===
Event	Gold	Silver	Bronze
Men's individual	Sebastian Rohrberg; Germany	Michele Frangilli; Italy	Markiyan Ivashko; Ukraine
Women's individual	Natalia Valeeva; Italy	Coby Hurkmans; Croatia	Nataliya Erdyniyeva; Russia
Men's team	Italy; Massimiliano Mandia; Marco Galiazzo; Michele Frangilli	Ukraine; Viktor Ruban; Valentin Javtura; Markiyan Ivashko	France; Jean-Charles Valladont; Olivier Tavernier; Damien Pigeaud
Women's team	Ukraine; Nina Mylchenko; Viktoriya Koval; Tetiana Dorokhova	Italy; Pia Lionetti; Elena Tonetta; Natalia Valeeva	Georgia; Khatuna Narimanidze; Kristine Esebua; Asmat Diasamidze

=== Compound ===
Event	Gold	Silver	Bronze
Men's individual	Sergio Pagni; Italy	Morten Bøe; Norway	Peter Elzinga; Netherlands
Women's individual	Anna Stanieczek; Poland	Ivana Buden; Croatia	Viktoriya Balzhanova; Russia
Men's team	France; Dominique Genet; Christophe Doussot; Pierre-Julien Deloche	Italy; Antonio Carminio; Sergio Pagni; Herian Boccali	Denmark; Patrick Laursen; Martin Damsbo; Nicklas Friese
Women's team	Croatia; Tanja Zorman; Lana Koller; Ivana Buden	Italy; Amalia Stucchi; Laura Longo; Eugenia Salvi	Russia; Viktoriya Balzhanova; Albina Loginova; Nataliya Avdeyeva
