= 2007 World Archery Championships – Men's individual compound =

The men's individual compound competition at the 2007 World Archery Championships took place in July 2007 in Leipzig, Germany. 139 archers entered the competition. Following a qualifying FITA round, the top 128 archers qualified for the 7-round knockout round, drawn according to their qualification round scores. The semi-finals and finals then took place on 15 July.

== Qualifying ==
The following archers were the leading 16 qualifiers:

1. (United States) Rodger Willett Jr. (3rd round)
2. (Norway) Morten Bøe (4th round)
3. (Italy) Sergio Pagni (3rd round)
4. (Sweden) Morgan Lundin (3rd round)
5. (Denmark) Martin Damsbo (3rd place)
6. (United States) Braden Gellenthien (2nd place)
7. (Finland) Jari Haavisto (3rd round)
8. (Australia) Patrick Coghlan (Quarterfinal)
9. (Iran) Majid Ahmadi (3rd round)
10. (El Salvador) Jorge Jiménez (2nd round)
11. (Netherlands) Peter Elzinga (1st round)
12. (United States) Reo Wilde (3rd round)
13. (Finland) Marko Jarvenpaa (3rd round)
14. (Australia) Clint Freeman (Quarterfinal)
15. (Netherlands) Emiel Custers (3rd round)
16. (Iran) Reza Amaninejad (2nd round)

== Finals ==
Quarterfinals
32	(Canada) Dietmar Trillus	116
8	(Australia) Patrick Coghlan	115
5	(Denmark) Martin Damsbo	114
20	(Canada) Kevin Tataryn	108
14	(Australia) Clint Freeman	110
6	(United States) Braden Gellenthien	115
23	(Spain) Jose Duo	114
18	(France) Sebastien Brasseur	112

Semifinals
32	(Canada) Dietmar Trillus	114
5	(Denmark) Martin Damsbo	113
6	(United States) Braden Gellenthien	117
23	(Spain) Jose Duo	114

Finals
32	(Canada) Dietmar Trillus	116^{10}
6	(United States) Braden Gellenthien	116^{9}
Third place
5	(Denmark) Martin Damsbo	115
23	(Spain) Jose Duo	111
