= 2009 World Archery Championships – Women's team compound =

The women's team compound competition at the 2009 World Archery Championships took place on 2–8 September 2009 in Ulsan, South Korea. 21 teams of 3 archers took part in the women's compound qualification round on 1 September. The 16 teams with the highest cumulative totals qualified for the 4-round knockout round on 7 September which was drawn according to their qualification round scores. The semi-finals and finals then took place on 8 September.

Second seeds Russia defeated South Korea in the final.

== Seeds ==
Seedings were based on the combined total of the team members' qualification scores in the individual ranking rounds. The top 16 teams were assigned places in the draw depending on their overall ranking.

1. (South Korea) Kwon Oh-hyang / Seo Jung-hee / Seok Ji-hyun (2nd place)
2. (Russia) Viktoria Balzhanova / Ekaterina Korobeynikova / Albina Loginova (champions)
3. (United States) Erika Anschutz / Kendal Nicely / Diane Watson (3rd place)
4. (Germany) Dorith Landesfeind / Melanie Mikala / Andrea Weihe (quarterfinal)
5. (Mexico) Ana del Milagro Crisanto / Almendra Ochoa / Linda Ochoa (4th place)
6. (Italy) Anastasia Anastasio / Laura Longo / Eugenia Salvi (1st round)
7. (Canada) Camille Bouffard-Demers / Sonia Schina / Ashley Wallace (1st round)
8. (Sweden) Isabell Danielsson / Malin Johansson / Zandra Reppe (quarterfinal)
9. (France) Valerie Febre / Pascale Lebecque / Francoise Volle (1st round)
10. (United Kingdom) Nicky Hunt / Lucy O'Sullivan / Nichola Simpson (quarterfinal)
11. (Netherlands) Inge Enthoven / Irina Markovic / Inge van Caspel (quarterfinal)
12. (Venezuela) Olga Bosch / Martha Flores / Luzmary Guedez (1st round)
13. (Iran) Ensieh Haji / Seyedeh-Vida Halimianavval / Sakhaei Far Leila (1st round)
14. (Belgium) Catheline Dessoy / Sarah Prieels / Gladys Willems (1st round)
15. (New Zealand) Stephanie Croskery / Linda Lainchbury / Mandy McGregor (1st round)
16. (Brazil) Nely Acquesta / Talita Araujo / Dirma Miranda dos Santos (1st round)

== Draw ==
1st round
1	South Korea	227
16	Brazil	215
9	France	222
8	Sweden	224
5	Mexico	222
12	Venezuela	217
13	Iran	214
4	Germany	227
3	United States	221
14	Belgium	220
11	Netherlands	226
6	Italy	225
7	Canada	221
10	United Kingdom	227
15	New Zealand	219
2	Russia	220

Quarterfinals
1	South Korea	227
8	Sweden	214
5	Mexico	221
4	Germany	216
3	United States	222
11	Netherlands	215
10	United Kingdom	217
2	Russia	226

Semifinals
1	South Korea	226
5	Mexico	224
3	United States	219
2	Russia	229

Finals
1	South Korea	209
2	Russia	215
Third place
5	Mexico	208
3	United States	223
