= 2007 World Archery Championships – Women's team compound =

The women's team compound competition at the 2007 World Archery Championships took place in July 2007 in Leipzig, Germany. 18 teams of three archers took part in the women's compound qualification round, and the 16 teams with the highest cumulative totals qualified for the four-round knockout round, drawn according to their qualification round scores. The semi-finals and finals then took place on 14 July.

Belgium were the surprise winners of the tournament, knocking out Russia and France before defeating Italy in the final. Top qualifiers the United States set a 24-arrow world record of 232 in their quarter-final round against Germany.

== Seeds ==
Seedings were based on the combined total of the team members' qualification scores in the individual ranking rounds. The top 16 teams were assigned places in the draw depending on their overall ranking.

1. (United States) Erika Anschutz / Kendal Nicely / Jamie van Natta (3rd place)
2. (Russia) Sofia Goncharova / Anna Kazantseva / Albina Loginova (quarterfinal)
3. (France) Amandine Bouillot / Joanna Chesse / Valerie Fabre (4th place)
4. (Sweden) Isabelle Danielsson / Petra Ericsson / Ingrid Olofsson (quarterfinal)
5. (Italy) Anastasia Anastasio / Eugenia Salvi / Giorgia Solato (2nd place)
6. (Mexico) Felisa de la Concha / Almendra Ochoa / Linda Ochoa (quarterfinal)
7. (Belgium) Catheline Dessoy / Petra Haemhouts / Gladys Willems (champions)
8. (Germany) Sabrina Jagemann / Melanie Mikala / Andrea Weihe (quarterfinal)
9. (Philippines) Jennifer Dy Chan / Maria Amaya Amparo Paz / Abigail Pineda Tindugan (1st round)
10. (Netherlands) Inge Enthoven / Wilma Heijnen / Irina Markovic (1st round)
11. (Venezuela) Martha Flores / Luzmary Guedez / Carolina Montes (1st round)
12. (Spain) Fatima Agudo / Elena Garcia / Flor Munoz (1st round)
13. (Australia) Erika Anear / Madeleine Ferris / Sherry Gale (1st round)
14. (India) Chanu Bheigyabati / Jhanu Hansdah / Sumanlata Murmu (1st round)
15. (Canada) Dawn Groszko / Marie-Michele Quirion / Ashley Wallace (1st round)
16. (South Africa) Amanda Delport / Jenny Papas / Susan Wilson (1st round)

== Draw ==
1st round
1	United States	224
16	South Africa	202
9	Philippines	212
8	Germany	216
5	Italy	221
12	Spain	213
13	Australia	203
4	Sweden	216
3	France	217
14	India	213
11	Venezuela	214
6	Mexico	215
7	Belgium	214
10	Netherlands	211
15	Canada	207
2	Russia	214

Quarterfinals
1	United States	232
8	Germany	220
5	Italy	228
4	Sweden	222
3	France	222
6	Mexico	220
7	Belgium	223
2	Russia	220

Semifinals
1	United States	220
5	Italy	222
3	France	218
7	Belgium	220

Finals
5	Italy	219
7	Belgium	223
Third place
1	United States	225
3	France	221
