= 2011 European Archery Grand Prix =

2011 European Archery Grand Prix was the annual archery competition in Europe in 2011.

== Meetings ==
1. Antalya, Turkey
2. Boé, France

== Results ==
=== Antalya ===
The first leg of the Grand Prix was held between 11–16 April 2011 at the Centennial Archery Field in Antalya. 25 European nations and Iraq took part in the first meeting.

==== Men ====
Event	Gold	Silver	Bronze
Compound individual	Sergio Pagni (ITA)	Herian Boccali (ITA)	Vladas Šigauskas (LTU)
Recurve individual	Marco Galiazzo (ITA)	Thomas Aubert (FRA)	Bair Badenov (RUS)
Recurve team	Great Britain	Italy	Netherlands

==== Women ====
Event	Gold	Silver	Bronze
Compound individual	Laura Longo (ITA)	Albina Loginova (RUS)	Eugenia Salvi (ITA)
Recurve individual	Alison Williamson (GBR)	Natalia Valeeva (ITA)	Inna Stepanova (RUS)
Recurve Team	Russia	Poland	Germany

==== Mixed ====
Event	Gold	Silver	Bronze
Compound	Italy	Russia	Lithuania
Recurve	Germany	Russia	Denmark

=== Boe ===
The second leg of the Grand Prix was held between 23–27 May 2011 in Boe.

==== Men ====
Event	Gold	Silver	Bronze
Compound individual	Antonio Pompeo (ITA)	Sergio Pagni (ITA)	Dominique Genet (FRA)
Compound team	Russia	Italy	France
Recurve individual	Mauro Nespoli (ITA)	Dmytro Hrachov (UKR)	Juan Ignacio Rodriguez (ESP)
Recurve team	Italy	Malaysia	Ukraine

==== Women ====
Event	Gold	Silver	Bronze
Compound individual	Albina Loginova (RUS)	Pascale Lebecque (FRA)	Viktoria Balzhanova (RUS)
Compound Team	Russia	Italy	France
Recurve individual	Lidiia Sichenikova (UKR)	Anna Bomboeva (RUS)	Justyna Mospinek (POL)
Recurve Team	Italy	Ukraine	Poland

==== Mixed ====
Event	Gold	Silver	Bronze
Compound	Russia	France	Italy
Recurve	Italy	Ukraine	France
