= 2012 European Archery Championships =

2012 European Championships
- Location: Amsterdam, Netherlands
- Dates: 21-26 May 2012

The 2012 European Archery Championships is the 20th edition of the European Archery Championships. The event was held in Amsterdam, Netherlands from 21 to 26 May, 2012.

== Medal table ==
* Host nation (Netherlands)

Rank	Nation	Gold	Silver	Bronze	Total
1	Netherlands	3	0	1	4
2	Italy	2	4	1	7
3	France	2	0	3	5
4	Germany	2	0	2	4
5	Russia	1	0	1	2
6	Great Britain	0	2	0	2
7	Denmark	0	1	0	1
7	Poland	0	1	0	1
7	Slovenia	0	1	0	1
7	Spain	0	1	0	1
11	Turkey	0	0	1	1
11	Ukraine	0	0	1	1
Totals (12 entries)		10	10	10	30

== Medal summary ==
=== Recurve ===
Event	Gold	Silver	Bronze
Men's individual	Netherlands; Rick van der Ven	Slovenia; Klemen Štrajhar	France; Thomas Faucheron
Women's individual	Russia; Ksenia Perova	United Kingdom; Naomi Folkard	France; Cyrielle Cotry
Men's team	Netherlands; Rick van der Ven; Sjef Van Den Berg; Rick van Den Oever	Italy; Michele Frangilli; Marco Galiazzo; Mauro Nespoli	Ukraine; Markiyan Ivashko; Viktor Ruban; Dmytro Hrachov
Women's team	France; Bérengère Schuh; Cyrielle Cotry; Celine Bezault	Spain; Karina Winter; Elena Richter; Lisa Unruh	Germany; Karina Lipiarska; Justyna Mospinek; Natalia Lesniak
Mixed Team	Italy; Natalia Valeeva; Mauro Nespoli	Poland; Anna Szukalska; Piotr Nowak	Turkey; Begül Löklüoğlu; Yağız Yılmaz

=== Compound ===
Event	Gold	Silver	Bronze
Men's individual	Italy; Sergio Pagni	Denmark; Martin Damsbo	Germany; Paul Titscher
Women's individual	Germany; Christina Berger	Italy; Anastasia Anastasio	Italy; Marcella Tonioli
Men's team	France; Pierre-Julien Deloche; Dominique Genet; Christophe Doussot	United Kingdom; Duncan Busby; Liam Grimwood; Chris White	Netherlands; Mike Schloesser; Peter Elzinga; Ruben Bleyendaal
Women's team	Germany; Christina Berger; Andrea Weihe; Melanie Mikala	Italy; Anastasia Anastasio; Marcella Tonioli; Laura Longo	France; Pascale Lebecque; Caroline Martret; Joanna Chesse
Mixed Team	Netherlands; Inge van Caspel; Peter Elzinga	Italy; Marcella Tonioli; Sergio Pagni	Russia; Albina Loginova; Dmitry Kozhin
