= 2009 World Archery Championships – Men's individual compound =

The men's individual compound competition at the 2009 World Archery Championships took place on 2–9 September 2009 in Ulsan, South Korea. 113 archers entered the competition, with one withdrawal before the qualification round on 2 September. As there were fewer than 128 entrants, all archers qualified for the 7-round knockout round on 5 September which was drawn according to their qualification round scores. The semi-finals and finals then took place on 9 September.

First seed Reo Wilde beat Liam Grimwood in the final by two points.

== Seeds ==
The top 16 qualifiers received byes to the second round.

1. (United States) Reo Wilde (Champion)
2. (United States) Dave Cousins (2nd round)
3. (El Salvador) Jorge Jiménez (2nd round)
4. (Germany) Paul Titscher (Quarterfinal)
5. (New Zealand) Stephen Clifton (3rd place)
6. (United States) Braden Gellenthien (3rd round)
7. (Slovenia) Dejan Sitar (4th round)
8. (Russia) Vladimir Fedosov (Quarterfinal)
9. (New Zealand) Shaun Teasdale (2nd round)
10. (Australia) Patrick Coghlan (3rd round)
11. (Netherlands) Peter Elzinga (3rd round)
12. (Brazil) Roberval dos Santos (2nd round)
13. (Finland) Marko Jarvenpaa (2nd round)
14. (Denmark) Martin Damsbo (2nd round)
15. (Israel) Franck Karsenty (2nd round)
16. (Sweden) Andres Malm (2nd round)

== Finals ==
Quarterfinals
1	(United States) Reo Wilde	118
8	(Russia) Vladimir Fedosov	116
5	(New Zealand) Stephen Clifton	115^{10}
4	(Germany) Paul Titscher	115^{9}
19	(Austria) Georg Dollinger	114
22	(United Kingdom) Liam Grimwood	116
42	(El Salvador) Roberto Hernández	114
34	(Spain) Jose Duo	116

Semifinals
1	(United States) Reo Wilde	119
5	(New Zealand) Stephen Clifton	112
22	(United Kingdom) Liam Grimwood	115
34	(Spain) Jose Duo	114

Finals
1	(United States) Reo Wilde	118
22	(United Kingdom) Liam Grimwood	116
Third place
5	(New Zealand) Stephen Clifton	117
34	(Spain) Jose Duo	114
