= 2008 European Archery Championships =

2008 European Championships
- Location: Vittel, France
- Dates: 13-17 May 2008
- Competitors: 297 from 41 nations

The 2008 European Archery Championships is the 20th edition of the European Archery Championships. The event was held in Vittel, France from 13 to 17 May, 2008.

== Medal table ==
* Host nation (France)

Rank	Nation	Gold	Silver	Bronze	Total
1	France	2	2	1	5
2	Russia	2	0	1	3
3	Netherlands	1	1	1	3
4	Italy	1	0	1	2
4	Poland	1	0	1	2
4	Sweden	1	0	1	2
7	Denmark	0	1	1	2
7	Germany	0	1	1	2
9	Great Britain	0	1	0	1
9	Slovenia	0	1	0	1
9	Ukraine	0	1	0	1
Totals (11 entries)		8	8	8	24

== Medal summary ==
=== Recurve ===
Event	Gold	Silver	Bronze
Men's individual	Russia; Balzhinima Tsyrempilov	Ukraine; Markiyan Ivashko	Poland; Rafał Dobrowolski
Women's individual	France; Bérengère Schuh	United Kingdom; Naomi Folkard	Italy; Pia Lionetti
Men's team	Italy; Mauro Nespoli; Marco Galiazzo; Ilario Di Buò	France; Thomas Aubert; Romain Girouille; Jean-Charles Valladont	Netherlands; Wietse van Alten; Pieter Custers; Ron van der Hoff
Women's team	Poland; Justyna Mospinek; Iwona Marcinkiewicz; Malgorzata Cwienczek	Germany; Karina Winter; Lisa Unruh; Anja Hitzler	Russia; Natalia Erdyniyeva; Ekaterina Jarjanova; Ksenia Perova

=== Compound ===
Event	Gold	Silver	Bronze
Men's individual	Sweden; Morgan Lundin	Slovenia; Dejan Sitar	Denmark; Martin Damsbo
Women's individual	France; Aurore Trayan	Denmark; Camilla Soemod	France; Amandine Bouillot
Men's team	Netherlands; Rob Polman; Peter Elzinga; Emiel Custers	France; Dominique Genet; Pierre Julien Deloche; Sebastien Brasseur	Sweden; Anders Malm; Morgan Lundin; Magnus Carlsson
Women's team	Russia; Albina Loginova; Sofia Goncharova; Anna Kazantseva	Netherlands; Irina Markovic; Inge Enthoven; Inge Enthoven	Germany; Sabrina Jagemann; Andrea Weihe; Melanie Mikala
