= 2009 World Archery Championships =

Archery competition in Ulsan, South Korea

- Venue: Ulsan Munsu International Archery Field
- Location: Ulsan, South Korea
- Start date: 1 September
- End date: 9 September
- Competitors: 412 from 64 nations

The 2009 World Archery Championships was the 45th edition of the event. It was held at the Ulsan Munsu International Archery Field in Ulsan, South Korea on 1–9 September 2009 and were organized by the World Archery Federation (FITA).

This was the last edition without a mixed team competition, which was included as a demonstration event.

== Medals table ==
* Host nation (South Korea)

Rank	Nation	Gold	Silver	Bronze	Total
1	South Korea*	4	3	0	7
2	Russia	2	1	1	4
3	United States	2	0	1	3
4	Japan	0	1	1	2
5	France	0	1	0	1
5	Great Britain	0	1	0	1
5	South Africa	0	1	0	1
8	Colombia	0	0	1	1
8	El Salvador	0	0	1	1
8	Italy	0	0	1	1
8	New Zealand	0	0	1	1
8	Ukraine	0	0	1	1
Totals (12 entries)		8	8	8	24

== Medals summary ==
=== Recurve ===
Event	Gold	Silver	Bronze
Men's individual	Lee Chang-hwan; South Korea	Im Dong-hyun; South Korea	Viktor Ruban; Ukraine
Women's individual	Joo Hyun-jung; South Korea	Kwak Ye-ji; South Korea	Natalia Sánchez; Colombia
Men's team	South Korea; Oh Jin-hyek; Lee Chang-hwan; Im Dong-hyun	France; Thomas Aubert; Jean-Charles Valladont; Romain Girouille	Japan; Hideki Kikuchi; Hiroshi Yamamoto; Hiroyuki Yoshinaga
Women's team	South Korea; Joo Hyun-jung; Kwak Ye-ji; Yun Ok-hee	Japan; Miki Kanie; Asako Matsunaga; Sayami Matsushita	Russia; Tatyana Boroday; Natalya Erdyniyeva; Tatiana Segina

=== Compound ===
Event	Gold	Silver	Bronze
Men's individual	Reo Wilde; United States	Liam Grimwood; Great Britain	Stephen Clifton; New Zealand
Women's individual	Albina Loginova; Russia	Jorina Coetzee; South Africa	Laura Longo; Italy
Men's team	United States; Dave Cousins; Braden Gellenthien; Reo Wilde	Russia; Vladimir Fedosov; Danzan Khaludorov; Anton Khlyschenko	El Salvador; Jorge Jiménez; Rigoberto Hernandez; Roberto Hernández
Women's team	Russia; Viktoria Balzhanova; Ekaterina Korobeynikova; Albina Loginova	South Korea; Kwon Oh-hyang; Seo Jung-hee; Seok Ji-hyun	United States; Erika Anschutz; Kendal Nicely; Diane Watson
