= 2013 European Indoor Archery Championships =

2013 European Indoor Championships
- Location: Rzeszów, Poland
- Dates: 27 February–2 March 2013

The 2013 European Indoor Archery Championships was the 14th edition of the European Indoor Archery Championships. The event was held in Rzeszów, Poland from 27 February to 2 March 2013 .

== Medal table ==
* Host nation (Poland)

Rank	Nation	Gold	Silver	Bronze	Total
1	Netherlands	3	1	1	5
2	Italy	1	2	2	5
3	Russia	1	2	1	4
4	France	1	2	0	3
5	Croatia	1	0	0	1
5	Ukraine	1	0	0	1
7	Great Britain	0	1	1	2
8	Denmark	0	0	2	2
9	Lithuania	0	0	1	1
Totals (9 entries)		8	8	8	24

== Medal summary ==
=== Recurve ===
Event	Gold	Silver	Bronze
Men's individual	Rick van der Ven; Netherlands	Jean-Charles Valladont; France	Sjef van den Berg; Netherlands
Women's individual	Natalia Erdyniyeva; Russia	Natalia Valeeva; Italy	Claudia Mandia; Italy
Men's team	Netherlands; Rick van der Ven; Sjef van den Berg; Rick van den Oever	Russia; Aleksandr Kozhin; Bair Tsybekdorzhiyev; Balzhinima Tsyrempilov	Italy; Luca Palazzi; Matteo Fissore; Alberto Zagami
Women's team	Ukraine; Lidiya Sichenikova; Kateryna Palekha; Viktoriya Koval	Italy; Claudia Mandia; Pia Lionetti; Natalia Valeeva	Russia; Natalia Erdyniyeva; Anna Bomboyeva; Inna Stepanova

=== Compound ===
Event	Gold	Silver	Bronze
Men's individual	Pierre-Julien Deloche; France	Peter Elzinga; Netherlands	Stephan Hansen; Denmark
Women's individual	Ivana Buden; Croatia	Naomi Jones; Great Britain	Jelena Babinina; Lithuania
Men's team	Netherlands; Peter Elzinga; Ruben Bleyendaal; Mike Schloesser	France; Sébastien Peineau; Sébastien Brasseur; Pierre-Julien Deloche	Denmark; Stephan Hansen; Martin Damsbo; Jan Bang
Women's team	Italy; Marcella Tonioli; Anastasia Anastasio; Laura Longo	Russia; Kira Andreyeva; Yelena Novikova; Albina Loginova	United Kingdom; Nichola Simpson; Claudine Jennings; Naomi Jones
