= Turkish Archery Federation =

Governing body of archery in Turkey

Turkish Archery Federation Türkiye Okçuluk Federasyonu
- Sport: Archery
- Abbreviation: (TOF)
- Founded: May 8, 1961
- Affiliation: World Archery Federation (WAF)
- Affiliation date: 1955
- Regional affiliation: European and Mediterranean Archery Union (EMAU)
- Location: Ankara, Turkey
- President: Abdullah Topaloğlu
- Secretary: A. Sirer Aydın

Official website
- www.tof.gov.tr

Turkish Archery Federation (Turkish: Türkiye Okçuluk Federasyonu, TOF) is the governing body of the archery sport in Turkey. It was founded in 1961. The Turkish organization is member of the European and Mediterranean Archery Union (EMAU) and the World Archery Federation (WAF). The TOF is based in Ankara and its current chairman is Abdullah Topaloğlu, who serves his second term elected in 2012.

The Turkish Archery Federation organizes archery outdoor, field and indoor competitions at national, European and World level in recurve and compound categories for men and women of senior, masters, juniors and cadets classes As of 2012, there are 969 licensed archers in Turkey.

== History ==
Modern archery sport in Turkey began in 1937 with the establishment of a club in Istanbul specialized in this branch. Archery was governed by the governmental Directorate General of Physical Education until its detachment and integration into the Turkish Shooting Federation in 1953. On May 8, 1961, archery activities were formed in an independent organization. In 1981, archery was subordinated under the shooting again, however that lasted only one year.

The Turkish Archery Federation became in 1955 as the 16th member of the International Archery Federation (FITA).

On May 31, 2006, the federation gained its complete administrative and financial independence.

== International events ==
=== Hosted ===
2006

- Grand Prix (2nd leg) - June 7–10, Antalya

2007

- 9th World Indoor Target Championships & 4th World Junior Indoor Championships - March, 13-17, Izmir
- European Grand Prix (2nd leg) / Archery World Cup (Stage 3) - May 29-June 2, Antalya
- Archery at the Black Sea Games- July 2–8, Trabzon

2008

- European Grand Prix (2nd leg) / World Cup (Stage 3) - May 27–31, Antalya
- 10th World Junior Outdoor Target Championships & 4th World Cadet Outdoor Target Championships - October, 6-11, Antalya

2009

- European Grand Prix (3rd leg) & FITA World Cup (Stage 3) - June 2–7, Antalya

2010

- World Cup (Stage 2) - June 6–12, Antalya
- European Club Teams Cup - October, 1-3, İzmir

2011

- Grand Prix (1st Leg) - April 11–16, Antalya
- World Cup (Stage 2) - June 6–12, Antalya
- World Cup Final - September 24–25, Istanbul

2012

- World Cup (Stage 2) - May 1–6, Antalya

=== To be hosted ===
2013;

- World Cup (Stage 2) - June, 10-16, Antalya
- Archery at the Mediterranean Games - June, 25-28, Mersin
- World Archery Championships - September 27–28, Antalya

== Notable archers ==
- Gizem Girişmen (born 1981), 2008 Summer Paralympics gold medalist
- Gökhan Ateş (born 1990), 2007 11th European And Mediterranean Compound Junior Man gold medalist
- Damla Günay (born 1982), member of the national team that won the silver medal at the 2005 Mediterranean Games
- Doğan Hancı (born 1970), 2012 Summer Paralympics bronze medalist
- Zekiye Keskin Şatır (born 1976), member of the national team that won the silver medal at the 2005 Mediterranean Games
- Begül Löklüoğlu (born 1988), 2012 FITA Archery World Cup bronze medalist
- Natalia Nasaridze (born 1972), Georgian origin 2000 European gold, 1997 World bronze medalist
- Zehra Öktem (born 1958), 2009 World Masters Games gold medalist
- Derya Bard Sarıaltın (born 1977), Ukrainian origin 2006 World Cup and Grand Prix gold medalist team member
- Begünhan Ünsal, 2010 Summer Youth Olympics bronze medalist mixed team member
- Mete Gazoz (born 1999), 2020 Summer Olympics gold medalist

== See also ==
- List of naturalized sportspeople of Turkey national archery teams
- Antalya Centennial Archery Field
