= 2007 World Archery Championships =

- Location: Leipzig, Germany
- Start date: 7 July
- End date: 15 July

The 2007 World Archery Championships was the 44th edition of the event. It was held in Leipzig, Germany on 7–15 July 2007 and was organized by International Archery Federation (FITA).

== Medals table ==
* Host nation (Germany)

Rank	Nation	Gold	Silver	Bronze	Total
1	South Korea	3	1	0	4
2	Italy	2	1	0	3
3	United States	1	1	1	3
4	Belgium	1	0	0	1
4	Canada	1	0	0	1
6	Russia	0	2	1	3
7	Great Britain	0	1	2	3
8	Chinese Taipei	0	1	1	2
9	Australia	0	1	0	1
10	Denmark	0	0	1	1
10	France	0	0	1	1
10	Sweden	0	0	1	1
Totals (12 entries)		8	8	8	24

== Medals summary ==
=== Recurve ===
Event	Gold	Silver	Bronze
Men's individual	Im Dong-hyun; South Korea	Baljinima Tsyrempilov; Russia	Alan Wills; Great Britain
Women's individual	Natalia Valeeva; Italy	Park Sung-hyun; South Korea	Natalya Erdyniyeva; Russia
Men's team	South Korea; Kim Yeon-chul; Lee Chang-hwan; Im Dong-hyun	United Kingdom; Larry Godfrey; Simon Terry; Alan Wills	Chinese Taipei; Kuo Cheng-wei; Liu Ming-huang; Wang Cheng-pang
Women's team	South Korea; Choi Eun-young; Lee Tuk-young; Park Sung-hyun	Chinese Taipei; Shen Hsiao-chun; Wu Hui-ju; Yuan Shu-chi	United Kingdom; Charlotte Burgess; Naomi Folkard; Alison Williamson

=== Compound ===
Event	Gold	Silver	Bronze
Men's individual	Dietmar Trillus; Canada	Braden Gellenthien; United States	Martin Damsbo; Denmark
Women's individual	Eugenia Salvi; Italy	Albina Loginova; Russia	Amandine Bouillot; France
Men's team	United States; Braden Gellenthien; Reo Wilde; Rodger Willett Jr.	Australia; Patrick Coghlan; Clint Freeman; Robert Timms	Sweden; Fredrik Lindblad; Morgan Lundin; Anders Malm
Women's team	Belgium; Catheline Dessoy; Petra Haemhouts; Gladys Willems	Italy; Anastasia Anastasio; Eugenia Salvi; Giorgia Solato	United States; Erika Anschutz; Kendal Nicely; Jamie van Natta
