= Archery at the Black Sea Games =

Archery was one of the ten sports contested at the Black Sea Games. The competition consisted of four events; there were individual and team competitions for each of the sexes. Russia was the most successful nation, having both the individual champions in Bato Shagdarov and Anna Fedorova, as well as taking the women's team title. The host nation Turkey won the men's team competition and was the only other nation to reach the individual podiums.

== Events ==
Event	Gold	Silver	Bronze
Men's individual	Bato Shagdarov; Russia	Mikhail Kazankov; Russia	Burak Beydili; Turkey
Women's individual	Anna Fedorova; Russia	Büşra Saygın; Turkey	Inna Stepanova; Russia
Men's team	Turkey (TUR); Burak Beydili; Buğra Erbay; Berkin Özkaya; Enes Uğurlu	Russia (RUS); Bato Shagdarov; Mikhail Kazankov; Rem Shakirov	Moldova (MDA); Alexandru Vasilevschi; Alexandru Hacina; Victor Costiucov
Women's team	Russia (RUS); Mayya Banzaraktsaeva; Anna Fedorova; Inna Stepanova	Turkey (TUR); Ümmühan Dursun; Su Tutku Kantoğlu; Özlem Kılınaslan	Georgia (GEO); Olesia Khladniuk; Salome Tarashvili; Natias Tsintsadze

== Women's individual ==
The Women's individual archery event at the 2007 Black Sea Games was part of the archery programme and took place at the Akçaabat Fatih Stadium. Ranking Round was scheduled for July 5. And rest of the competition July 6.

21 archers from 6 countries for the event at the 2007 Black Sea Games.

The competition began with the ranking round. Each archer fired 72 arrows. This round was done entirely to seed the elimination brackets; all archers moved on to them. The elimination rounds used a single-elimination tournament, with fixed brackets based on the ranking round seeding. In each round of elimination, the two archers in each match fired 12 arrows; the archer with the higher score advanced to the next round while the other archer was eliminated.

the oldest archer : Özlem Kılınaslan, Turkey, 25 January 1989

the youngest archer : Evangelia Giamvria, Greece, 3 March 1992

=== Participating countries ===
- Georgia
- Greece
- Moldova

- Romania
- Russia
- Turkey

=== Schedule ===
Date	Time	Round
Thursday, July 5, 2007	10:00-12:00	Ranking round
Friday, July 6, 2007	09:45-10:15	Round of 16
Friday, July 6, 2007	10:15-10:45	Quarterfinals
Friday, July 6, 2007	10:45-11:15	Semifinals
Friday, July 6, 2007	17:30-18:00	Finals
