= 2026 European Archery Championships – Men's individual compound =

Archery sporting event

Men's individual compound at the 2026 European Archery Championships
- Venue: Antalya Centennial Archery Field
- Location: Antalya, Turkey
- Dates: 18–24 May

The men's individual compound competition at the 2026 European Archery Championships was held from 18 to 24 May 2026 in Antalya, Turkey. The event was part of the European Outdoor Championships in Antalya.

The winner was Emircan Haney. Mike Schloesser placed third.
