= Ksenia Perova =

Russian archer (born 1989)

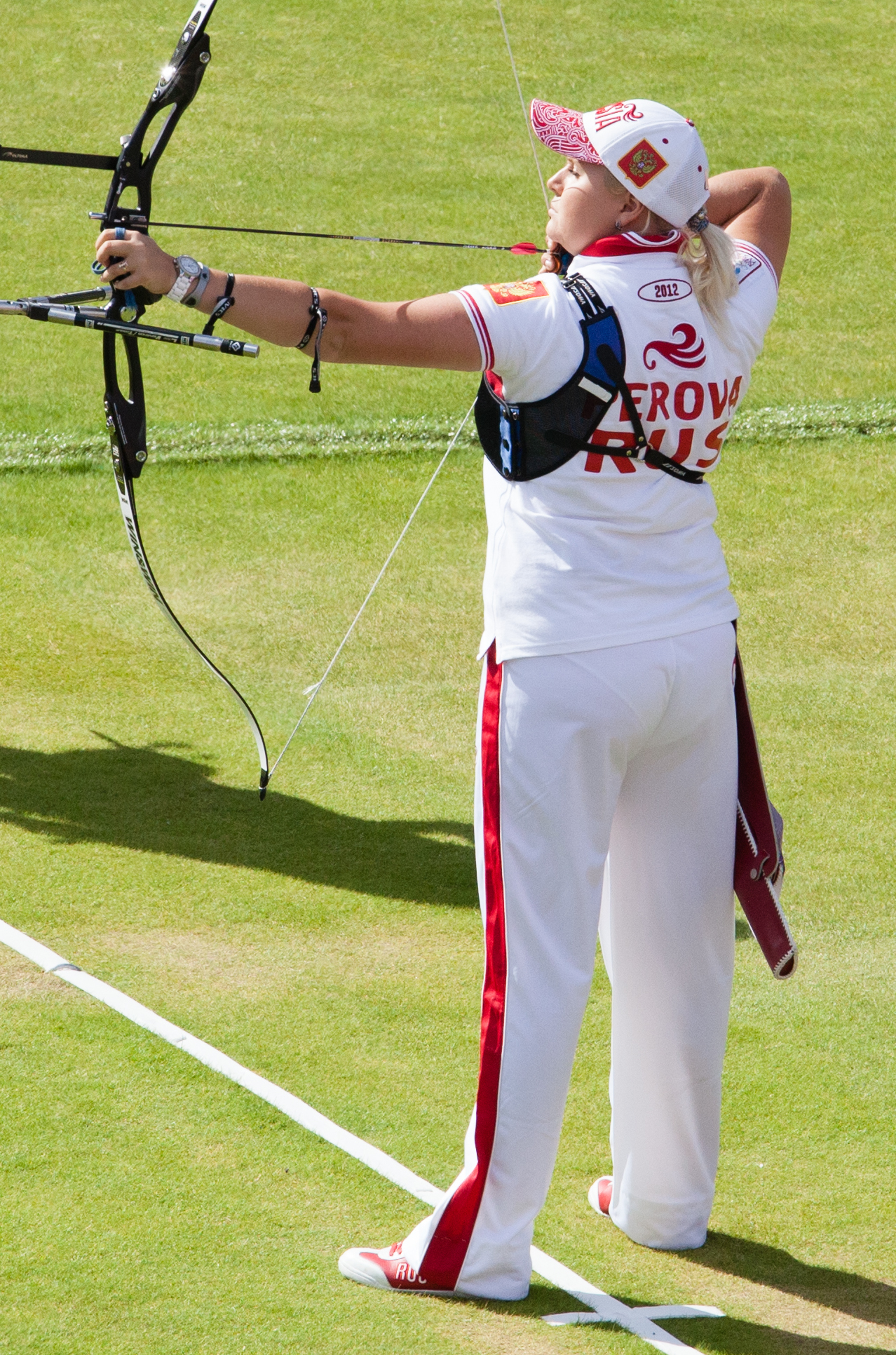
- Perova at the 2012 Summer Olympics

Personal information
- Full name: Ksenia Vitalyevna Perova
- Nationality: (Russia) Russian
- Born: 8 February 1989 (age 37) Lesnoy, Sverdlovsk Oblast, RSFSR, USSR (now Russia)

Sport
- Country: Russia
- Sport: Archery
- Event: recurve
Medal record
Women's archery
Representing (Russia) ROC
Olympic Games
Silver medal – second place	2020 Tokyo	Team
Representing Russia
Olympic Games
Silver medal – second place	2016 Rio de Janeiro	Team
World Championships
Gold medal – first place	2015 Copenhagen	Team
Gold medal – first place	2017 Mexico	Individual
European Championships
Gold medal – first place	2010 Rovereto	Team
Gold medal – first place	2012 Amsterdam	Individual
Gold medal – first place	2021 Antalya	Team
Bronze medal – third place	2008 Vittel	Team
World Cup
Gold medal – first place	2017 Antalya	Individual
Gold medal – first place	2018 Antalya	Individual
Silver medal – second place	2016 Antalya	Individual
Silver medal – second place	2017 Rome (Final)	Individual
Silver medal – second place	2021 Lausanne	Individual
Bronze medal – third place	2010 Antalya	Individual

Ksenia Vitalyevna Perova (Russian: Ксения Витальевна Перова, IPA: [ˈksʲenʲɪɪ̯ə pʲɪˈrovə]; born 8 February 1989 in Lesnoy, Sverdlovsk Oblast) is a Russian archer. At the 2012 Summer Olympics she competed for her country in the Women's team event, and went on to compete in the 2016 Summer Olympics as well.

== Career ==
At the 2012 Summer Olympics, she finished in 5th place in the individual, and 4th with the Russian women's team. At the 2016 Olympics, she finished in the 17th in the individual but won a silver medal in the team event, with Russia losing to South Korea in the final.

In 2021, she won the gold medal in the women's team recurve event at the 2021 European Archery Championships held in Antalya, Turkey.
