= Patrizio Hofer =

Swiss archer

Medal record

Representing Switzerland

Men's Archery

World Cup
| Silver medal – second place | 2008 Lausanne | Individual |
| Silver medal – second place | 2014 Lausanne | Mixed team |
| Bronze medal – third place | 2009 Copenhagen | Individual |

Patrizio Hofer (born 2 April 1980) is a compound archer from Switzerland.

He regularly represents Switzerland at the highest level World Archery Federation competitions, including the FITA Archery World Cup and the World Archery Championships. In the 2008 and 2009 World Cups, he reached the final, finishing 2nd and 3rd respectively. His highest world ranking is 4, achieved in 2010.
