= Kwak Ye-ji =

South Korean archer (born 1992)

Medal record

Women's archery

Representing South Korea

World Championships
Gold medal – first place	2009 Ulsan	Team
Silver medal – second place	2009 Ulsan	Individual

World Cup Final
Gold medal – first place	2009 Copenhagen	Individual

Youth Olympic Games
Gold medal – first place	2010 Singapore	Individual

Kwak Ye-ji (Korean: 곽예지, born 8 September 1992) is a South Korean archer who participated at the 2010 Summer Youth Olympics in Singapore. She won the gold medal in the girls' event, defeating Tan Ya-ting of Chinese Taipei in the final. In the ranking rounds, she had fired a score of 670, a new junior world record. Kwak also won the women's recurve event at the 2009 World Cup.
