= Burak Beydili =

Turkish archer (born 1990)

Medal record

Men's archery
Gold medal – first place	2007 Trabzon	Team
Bronze medal – third place	2007 Trabzon	individual

Burak Beydili (born May 2, 1990) is an archer from Turkey.
