= Pia Lionetti =

Italian archer (born 1987)

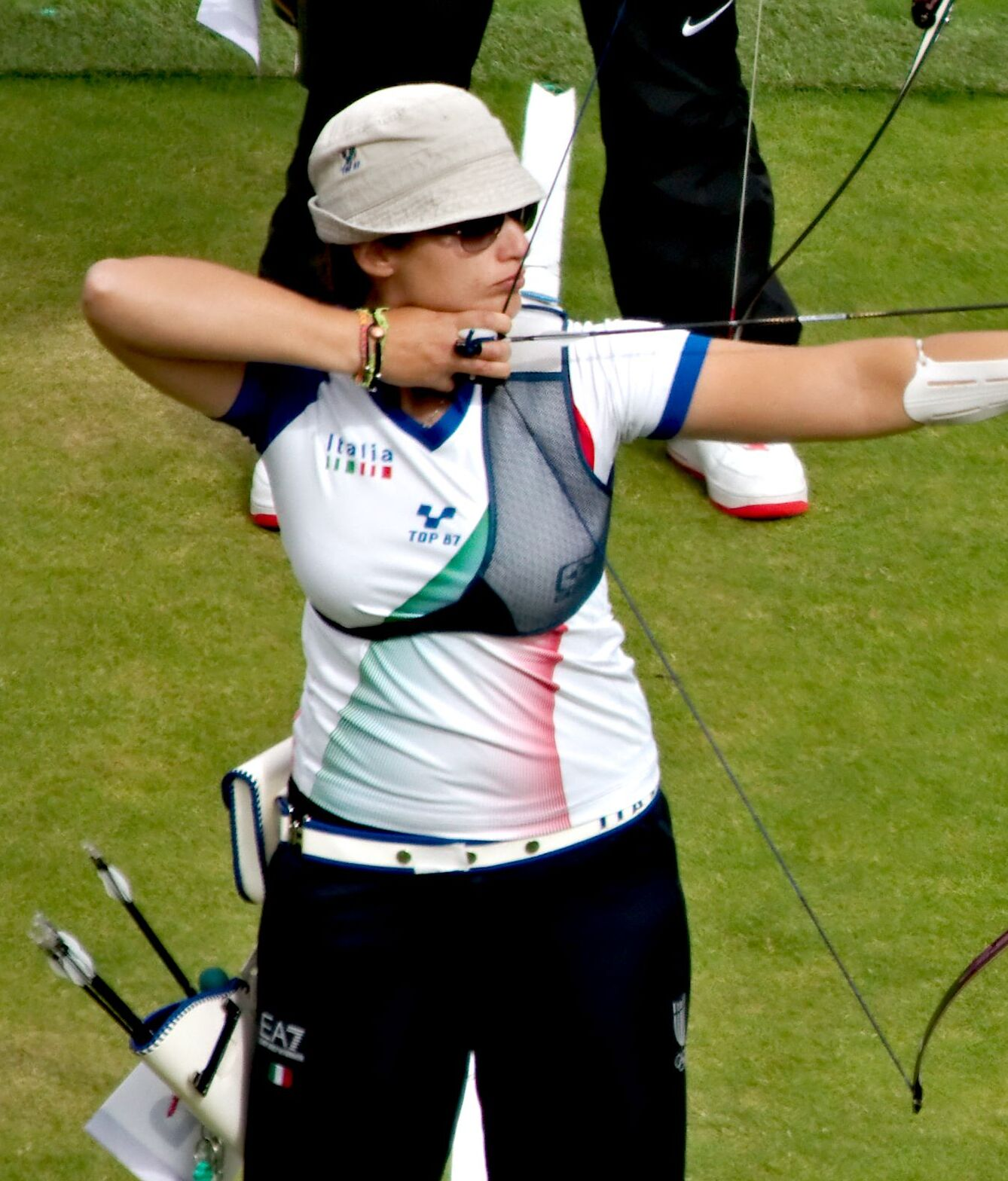
- Lionetti in 2012

Personal information
- Full name: Pia Carmen Maria Lionetti
- Born: 26 February 1987 (age 39) San Giovanni Rotondo, Italy
- Height: 1.62 m (5 ft 4 in)
- Weight: 54 kg (119 lb)

Sport
- Country: Italy
- Sport: Archery
- Club: C.S. Aeronautica Militare
Medal record
Women's recurve archery
Representing Italy
World Indoor Championships
Gold medal – first place	2009 Rzeszów	Team
Military World Games
Gold medal – first place	2015 Mungyeong	Team
Mediterranean Games
Gold medal – first place	2005 Almería	Team
European Championships
Silver medal – second place	2004 Brussels	Team
Bronze medal – third place	2006 Athens	Individual
Bronze medal – third place	2008 Vittel	Individual
Bronze medal – third place	2010 Rovereto	Team
European Indoor Championships
Silver medal – second place	2010 Poreč	Team
Silver medal – second place	2013 Rzeszów	Team

Pia Carmen Maria Lionetti (born 26 September 1987 in San Giovanni Rotondo), is an Italian archer and twice a member of the Italian Olympic Team. She lives in Barletta and attends the University of Foggia.

== Biography ==
She was the Junior World Champion in 2005 winning the individual gold medal and the team gold medal too. In 2006, she won the bronze medal at the European Championships.

At the 2008 Summer Olympics in Beijing Lionetti finished her ranking round with a total of 613 points. This gave her the 51st seed for the final competition bracket in which she faced 14th seed Bérengère Schuh in the first round. The archer from France was too strong with a 112–107 score. Together with Natalia Valeeva and Elena Tonetta she also took part in the team event. With her 613 score from the ranking round combined with the 634 of Valeeva and the 595 of Tonetta the Italian team was in 9th position after the ranking round. In the first round they were too strong for the team from Chinese Taipei, beating them with 215–211. However, in the quarter-final they were eliminated by the eventual gold medalists from South Korea, despite a 217 points score. The Koreans managed to shoot a new World Record of 231 points to advance to the semi-final.

At the 2012 Summer Olympics she again competed in the women's individual and team events. She was 10th after the ranking round and beat Karen Hultzer in the first elimination round. She then went on to beat Miranda Leek and Tan Ya-ting, before losing to Aida Román. In the team event, Lionetti, Jessica Tomasi and Natalia Valeeva lost by one point (199-200) to China in the first round.

== International medals ==
Gold Individual Junior World Cup (Indoor), Aalborg 2005
Gold Individual Junior European Championship (Indoor), Sassari 2004
Gold Individual Junior European Championship (Outdoor), Nymburk 2004
Bronze Individual European Championship (Outdoor), Athens 2006
Bronze Individual World Cup (Outdoor), Porec 2006
Gold Team World Cup (Indoor), Aalborg 2005
Gold Team Grand Prix, Sassari 2006
Silver Team World Cup (Outdoor), Antalya 2007
Silver Team Junior (Indoor), Sassari 2004
