= Enes Uğurlu =

Turkish archer (born 1989)

Personal information
- Born: March 9, 1989 (age 37)
Medal record
Men's archery
Gold medal – first place	2007 Trabzon	Team

Enes Uğurlu (born March 9, 1989) is an archer from Turkey.
