= Antalya Centennial Archery Field =

Archery field located in Antalya, Turkey

- Antalya 100. Yıl Okçuluk Sahası
- Interactive map of Antalya Centennial Archery Field
- Location: Meltem Mah., Antalya, Turkey
- Coordinates: 36.88901°N 30.67057°E
- Owner: Directorate General of Youth and Sports (GSGM)
- Operator: Anatalya Archery Club (Antalya Okçuluk İhtisas Kulübü)
- Capacity: 500
- Surface: Lawn
- Field size: 140 m × 175 m (459 ft × 574 ft)

Construction
- Opened: November 17, 1998

Tenants
- Antalya Archery Club (Antalya Okçuluk İhtisas Kulübü); Antalya Anadolu Archery Club (Antalaya Anadolu Okçuluk Kulübü)

Antalya Centennial Archery Field (Turkish: Antalya 100. Yıl Okçuluk Sahası) is an archery field in Antalya, Turkey.

Situated in the Meltem neighborhood, the archery field on the lawn has the dimensions 140 m × 175 m (459 ft × 574 ft), where 50 targets can be placed. İt has a seating capacity of 500 spectators. The venue was leased to the Antalya Archery Club (Antalya Okçuluk İhtisas Kulübü) on November 17, 1998, for 49 years by its owner, the Directorate General of Youth and Sports.

The facility also has offices, a lounge area, and a meeting room. It is also home to Antalya Anadolu Archery Club (Antalaya Anadolu Okçuluk Kulübü).

The venue hosts the FITA Archery World Cup competitions organized by the World Archery Federation (WAF) and run by the Turkish Archery Federation since 2006.

== International events ==
- 2006 Grand Prix (2nd leg) - June 7–10
- 2007 European Grand Prix (2nd leg) / Archery World Cup (Stage 3) - May 29-June 2
- 2008 European Grand Prix (2nd leg) / World Cup (Stage 3) - May 27–31
- 10th World Junior Outdoor Target Championships & 4th World Cadet Outdoor Target Championships - October 6–11, 2008
- 2009 European Grand Prix (3rd leg) & FITA World Cup (Stage 3) - June 2–7
- 2010 World Cup (Stage 2) - June 6–12
- 2011 European Archery Grand Prix (1st leg) - April 11–16
- 2011 World Cup (Stage 2) - June 6–12
- 2012 World Cup (Stage 2) - May 1–6
- 2013 World Cup (Stage 2) - June, 10-16
- 2013 World Archery Championships - September 27–28
