= Boé =

- Commune
- Location of Boé
- Location within France Location within Nouvelle-Aquitaine
- Coordinates: 44°09′36″N 0°37′44″E
- Country: France
- Region: Nouvelle-Aquitaine
- Department: Lot-et-Garonne
- Arrondissement: Agen
- Canton: Agen-2
- Intercommunality: Agglomération d'Agen

Government
  - Mayor (2020–2026): Pascale Luguet
- Area^{1}: 16.5 km^{2} (6.4 sq mi)
- Elevation: 51 m (167 ft)
- Highest elevation: 59 m (194 ft)
- Lowest elevation: 37 m (121 ft)
- Population (2023): 5,846
  - Density: 354/km^{2} (918/sq mi)
- Time zone: UTC+01:00 (CET)
  - Summer (DST): UTC+02:00 (CEST)
- INSEE/Postal code: 47031 /47550
- ^{1} French Land Register data, which excludes lakes, ponds, glaciers > 1 km^{2} (0.386 sq mi or 247 acres) and river estuaries.

Boé (French pronunciation: [bɔe]; Occitan: Boèr) is a commune in the Lot-et-Garonne department in southwestern France. It stands on the voie verte cycle path along the Canal de Garonne.

== Geography ==
The Séoune forms part of the commune's eastern border, then flows into the Garonne, which forms the commune's southeastern and southwestern borders.

== Population ==
Historical population
Year	Pop.	±% p.a.
1968	2,633	—
1975	3,231	+2.97%
1982	3,960	+2.95%
1990	4,021	+0.19%
1999	4,503	+1.27%
2007	5,278	+2.00%
2012	5,458	+0.67%
2017	5,593	+0.49%
2023	5,846	+0.74%
Source: INSEE

== See also ==
- Communes of the Lot-et-Garonne department
