= Dietmar Trillus =

Canadian archer

Medal record

Men's archery

Representing Canada

World Championships
Gold medal – first place	2007 Leipzig	Individual
Bronze medal – third place	2011 Turin	Team

World Cup
Gold medal – first place	2008 Lausanne	Individual

non-FITA Events
Gold medal – first place	2010 Las Vegas	Individual

Dietmar Trillus (born 21 May 1958) is a German-born Canadian compound archer. He took up archery in 2000, and has since won several stages of the FITA Archery World Cup, including the 2008 Final, and the 2007 World Championships. In 2010 Dietmar became the first non-USA resident to win the prestigious Vegas Indoor Archery Festival in Mens Championship.
