= Camilla Sømod =

Danish archer (born 1985)

Medal record

Women's compound archery

Representing Denmark

World Championships
Bronze medal – third place	2005 Madrid	Team

World Cup Final
Silver medal – second place	2009 Copenhagen	Individual

European Championships
Gold medal – first place	2006 Athens	Individual
Silver medal – second place	2010 Rovereto	Mixed Team
Silver medal – second place	2008 Vittel	Individual

World Games
Silver medal – second place	2013 Cali	Individual

Camilla Sømod (born 27 February 1985), is a Danish compound archer. She has represented the Danish national senior team since 1999. Her achievements include medals at the World Archery Championships (including gold at the Junior World Championships in 2002, FITA Archery World Cup, European Archery Championships, and becoming the world number one ranked archer in August 2009.

Sømod ended her professional career after the WORLD ARCHERY CHAMPIONSHIPS 2015 in Copenhagen.

== Worklife after retirement from sports career ==
Since 2015 Camilla has been full time employed in the family business Sømods Bolcher.

Sømods Bolcher was appointed a Purveyors To The Royal Danish Court in 1991. The appointment was made the same year as the companies 100th anniversary.
