= Amandine Bouillot =

French archer (born 1984)

Medal record

Women's archery

Representing France

World Championships
| Bronze medal – third place | 2007 Leipzig | Individual |

World Cup Final
| Bronze medal – third place | 2008 Lausanne | Individual |

World University Championships
| Gold medal – first place | 2006 Viničné | Individual |

Summer Universiade
| Gold medal – first place | 2005 Izmir | Individual |

Amandine Bouillot (born 14 March 1984, Nancy, France), is a French athlete who competes in compound archery. She has represented the French national team since 2006. Her achievements include gold medals at the 2005 Summer Universiade and 2006 World University Championships, individual medals at the two major World Archery compound events the World Archery Championships and World Cup, and becoming the world number one ranked archer in May 2008.
