= Patrick Coghlan =

Australian archer

Medal record

Representing Australia

Men's Archery

World Cup
Bronze medal – third place	2008 Lausanne	Individual

Patrick Coghlan (born 10 September 1974) is a compound archer from Australia.

Patrick Coghlan competed at the 2010 Commonwealth Games, finishing 9th, and regularly represents Australia at the highest level World Archery Federation competitions, including the FITA Archery World Cup and the World Archery Championships. In 2008 he reached the World Cup final, finishing 3rd, and he was the Australian Open champion in 2010 and 2011. His highest world ranking is 2, achieved in 2009.
