= Albina Loginova =

Russian archer (born 1983)

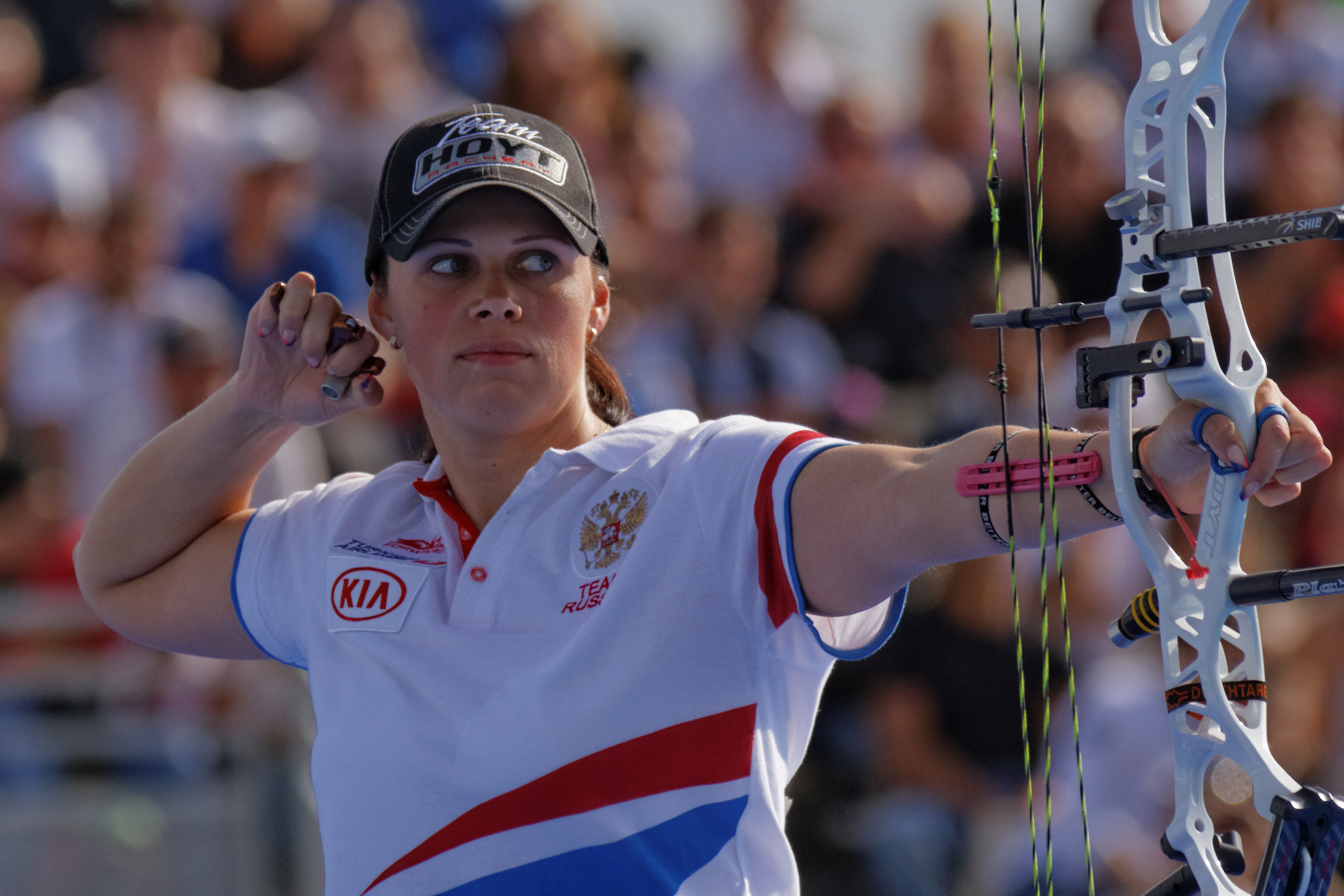
- Albina Loginova at FITA Archery World Cup in September 2013.

Personal information
- Citizenship: Russian
- Born: 7 August 1983 (age 42) Sarov, Russian SSR, Soviet Union
- Occupation: Archer
Medal record
Women's archery
Representing Russia
World Championships
Gold medal – first place	2009 Ulsan	Individual
Gold medal – first place	2009 Ulsan	Team
Gold medal – first place	2011 Turin	Individual
Silver medal – second place	2007 Leipzig	Individual
Silver medal – second place	2013 Belek	Mixed team
World Cup Final
Gold medal – first place	2010 Edinburgh	Individual
Bronze medal – third place	2013 Paris	Individual
World Indoor Championships
Silver medal – second place	2012 Las Vegas	Team
Silver medal – second place	2016 Ankara	Individual
Silver medal – second place	2016 Ankara	Team
Summer Universiade
Gold medal – first place	2009 Belgrade	Mixed team
Silver medal – second place	2009 Belgrade	Team
European Archery Championships
Bronze medal – third place	2010 Rovereto	Individual
Bronze medal – third place	2010 Rovereto	Team
Bronze medal – third place	2012 Amsterdam	Mixed team
Gold medal – first place	2014 Vagharshapat	Team
Silver medal – second place	2014 Vagharshapat	Mixed team

Albina Nikolayevna Loginova (Russian: Альбина Николаевна Логинова; born 7 August 1983) is a Russian compound archer. She was the World Archery number one in women's compound archery, achieving it on 9 July 2013. She now serves as a coach.

== Career ==
Loginova started archery in 2002 and reached the Russian national archery team for the first time in 2006. In June 2007 she became Russian national champion in the individuel compound competition to gain a spot in the Russian team that qualified for the 2007 World Archery Championships in Leipzig, Germany and the 2008 European Outdoor Championships in Vittel, France. Loginova reached the final of the World Championships in Leipzig by winning the semi-final over Amandine Bouillot 114-109 after shooting a perfect 30 points in the second out of four legs. In the final she faced 2007 Indoor World Champion Eugenia Salvi of Italy who clinched her second World title of the year by beating Loginova 111–107, leaving her with the silver medal. At the European Championships in Vittel she reached the individual quarter final to lose to the eventual champion Aurore Trayan, while in the team event (alongside Sofia Goncharova and Anna Kazantseva) Russia went on to win the title with a 233–222 win over the Netherlands. At the World University Championships she claimed the bronze medal in the individual competition.

At the 2009 Summer Universiade in Belgrade Loginova managed to win two medals. A gold one in the mixed team event together with Danzan Khaludorov and a silver medal in the women's team event with Natalia Avdeeva and Viktoria Balzhanova. She claimed her first World title also in 2009, winning both the individual and team competition at the 2009 World Outdoor Championships in Ulsan, South Korea. In the team event she won the gold medal together with Ekaterina Korobeynikova and Viktoria Balzhanova by beating the home nation in the final. Individually she beat South African archer Jorina Coetzee in the final, while Laura Longo from Italy took the bronze medal. With the Russian team she won the gold medal at the 2010 World Cup encounter in Poreč, Croatia in 2010. The European Outdoor Championships of 2010 that followed in Rovereto were less successful. Both individually and in the Russian team she was eliminated in the semi-finals, having to fight for the bronze medal, which both succeeded. Later on that year the Russian team recovered with a win in the World Cup held in Antalya, Turkey, while Loginova individually managed to win the prestigious FITA Archery World Cup Final held in Edinburgh, Great Britain.

2011 started good for Loginova at the World Cup Indoor Challenge held in Las Vegas. With a 7-1 semi final win over first seed Jamie Van Natta she reached the final in which she was too strong for the Belgian archer Gladys Willems in a 6–2 victory. At the 2011 Archery European Indoor Championships held in Cambrils, Spain she finished second behind Marcella Tonioli in the individual competition and she took the gold medal with Viktoria Balzhanova in the women's team event. In preparation to the World Championships to be held in Turin Loginova managed to win the individual and the team competition at the 2011 European Archery Grand Prix meeting in Boé, France and a bronze medal at the World Cup meeting in Shanghai individually. Then in Turin at the World Championships she successfully defended her World Championships title with a win in the final over Pascale Lebecque.

The 2012 World Indoor Championships were held in Las Vegas. Individually Laginova disappointed with not even reaching the quarter-finals, but in the team event Russia went on to reach the final. Together with Natalia Avdeeva and Viktoria Balzhanova, Loginova won the silver medal as the team from the United States were too strong. At the 2012 FITA Archery World Cup in Shanghai two silver medals were won (individually and in the team event), while in Antalya Loginova won her first individual World Cup gold medal after she won the World Cup Final in Edinburgh 2010. Later that year she won the bronze medal with Dmitry Kozhin in the mixed team event at the European Outdoor Championships in Amsterdam.

== Achievements ==
2005
6th, European Grand Prix, individual, Sofia
2006
6th, World University Championships, individual, Slovakia
11th, European Outdoor Championships, individual, Athens
2007
32nd, World Cup, individual, Varese
(silver) World Outdoor Championships, individual, Leipzig
12th, World Cup, individual, Dover
2008
(bronze) World Cup, individual, Santo Domingo
(gold) World Cup, women's team, Santo Domingo
10th, World Cup, individual, Poreč
4th, World Cup, women's team, Poreč
6th, European Outdoor Championships, individual, Vittel
(gold) European Outdoor Championships, women's team, Vittel
10th, World Cup, individual, Antalya
(gold) World Cup, women's team, Antalya
9th, World Cup, individual, Boé
(bronze) World Cup, women's team, Boé
(bronze) World University Championships, individual, Tainan
2009
12th, World Indoor Championships, individual, Rzeszów
4th, World Indoor Championships, women's team, Rzeszów
(silver) European Grand Prix, individual, Riom
5th, World Cup, individual, Poreč
(gold) , World Cup, women's team, Poreč
9th, World Cup, individual, Antalya
9th, World Cup, women's team, Antalya
(gold) Summer Universiade, mixed team, Belgrade
(silver) Summer Universiade, women's team, Belgrade
4th, Summer Universiade, individual, Belgrade
(gold) World Cup, women's team, Shanghai
(bronze) World Cup, individual, Shanghai
(gold) World Outdoor Championships, individual, Ulsan
(gold) World Outdoor Championships, women's team, Ulsan
2010
(gold) World Cup, women's team, Poreč
6th, World Cup, individual, Poreč
9th, World Cup, mixed team, Poreč
(bronze) , European Outdoor Championships, individual, Rovereto
(bronze) , European Outdoor Championships, women's team, Rovereto
5th, European Outdoor Championships, mixed team, Rovereto
(gold) , World Cup, women' team, Antalya
5th, World Cup, individual, Antalya
9th, European Grand Prix, individual, Moscow
5th, World Cup, individual, Ogden
(silver) World Cup, women's team, Shanghai
4th, World Cup, individual, Shanghai
8th, World Cup, mixed team, Shanghai
(gold) World Cup Final, individual, Edinburgh
2011
(gold) World Cup Indoor Challenge, individual, Las Vegas
(gold) European Indoor Championships, women's team, Cambrils
(silver) European Indoor Championships, individual, Cambrils
(silver) EMAU Grand Prix, individual, Antalya
(silver) EMAU Grand Prix, mixed team, Antalya
(bronze) World Cup, women's team, Poreč
4th, World Cup, mixed team, Poreč
5th, World Cup, individual, Poreč
(gold) EMAU Grand Prix, individual, Boé
(gold) EMAU Grand Prix, women's team, Boé
(bronze) World Cup, individual, Antalya
5th, World Cup, women's team, Antalya
5th, World Cup, mixed team, Antalya
(gold) World Outdoor Championships, individual, Turin
6th, World Outdoor Championships, women's team, Turin
10th, World Outdoor Championships, mixed team, Turin
8th, World Cup, individual, Ogden
(silver) World Cup, women's team, Shanghai
5th, World Cup, mixed team, Shanghai
7th, World Cup, individual, Shanghai
6th, World Cup, individual, Istanbul
2012
(silver) World Indoor Championships, women's team, Las Vegas
9th, World Indoor Championships, individual, Las Vegas
9th, World Cup Indoor Final, individual, Las Vegas
(silver) World Cup, individual, Shanghai
(silver) World Cup, women's team, Shanghai
(gold) World Cup, individual, Antalya
4th, World Cup, women's team, Antalya
9th, World Cup, mixed team, Antalya
(bronze) European Championships, mixed team, Amsterdam
4th, European Championships, women's team, Amsterdam
9th, European Championships, individual, Amsterdam
