= Gladys Willems =

Belgian archer (born 1977)

Medal record

Women's archery

Representing Belgium
Gold medal – first place	2003 Nîmes	Individual

European Archery Championships
Gold medal – first place	2010 Rovereto	Team
Silver medal – second place	2010 Rovereto	Individual

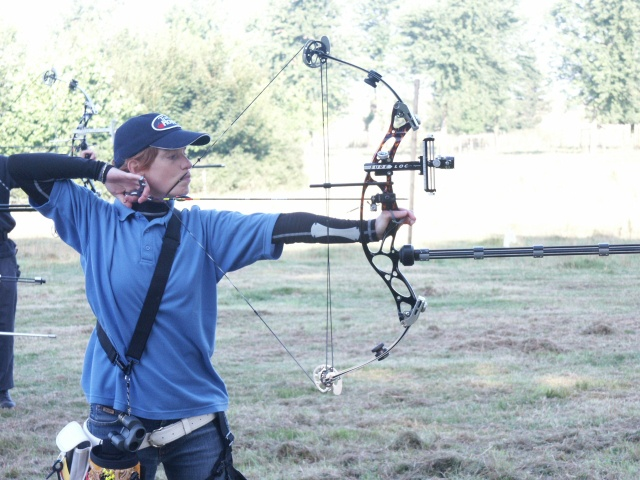
Gladys Willems

Gladys Willems (born 4 January 1977 in Schoten) is a Belgian compound archer. She has competed at the major World Archery Federation competitions, the World Cup, winning stage medals, and the World Archery Championships, winning a gold medal at the indoor championships. She set a world record of 149 for a 15-arrow round in 2011, a record which stood until broken by Sara López's first ever perfect round of 150 in 2013, and a FITA round world record of 1411 in 2007 in Lausanne. The highest world ranking she has achieved is 4, in 2007.
