= Liam Grimwood =

English archer

Liam Grimwood is an English archer who won a gold medal at the 2010 Commonwealth Games in Delhi.
