= Sergio Pagni =

Italian archer (born 1979)

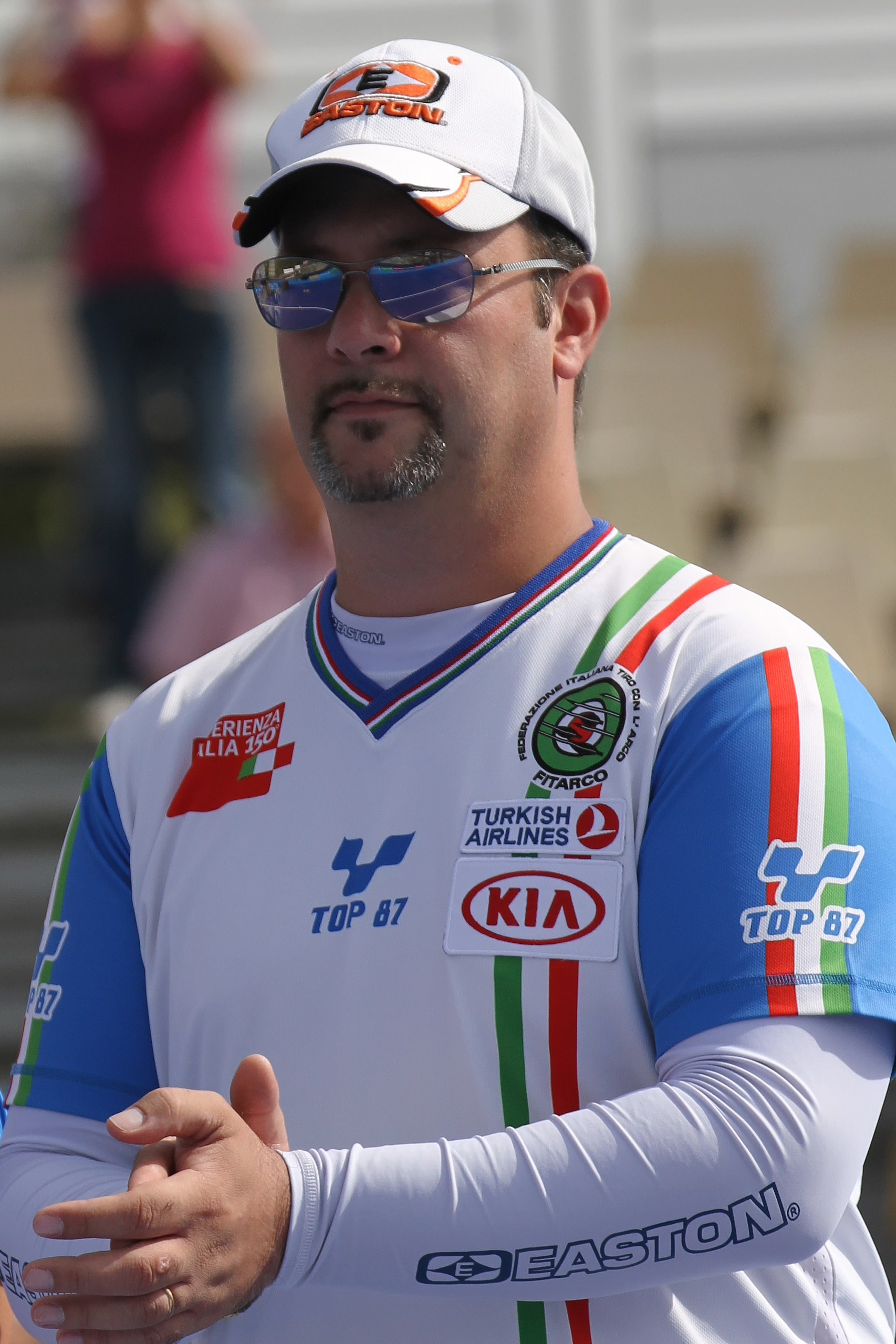

Medal record

Men's compound archery

Representing Italy

World Championships
Gold medal – first place	2011 Turin	Mixed Team
Gold medal – first place	2013 Belek	Mixed Team
Silver medal – second place	2017 Mexico City	Team
Bronze medal – third place	2017 Mexico City	Mixed Team

World Cup
Gold medal – first place	2009 Copenhagen	Individual
Gold medal – first place	2010 Edinburgh	Individual
Silver medal – second place	2013 Paris	Mixed Team
Bronze medal – third place	2011 Istanbul	Individual
Bronze medal – third place	2013 Paris	Individual

World Indoor Championships
Gold medal – first place	2014 Nîmes	Individual

Universiade
Gold medal – first place	2005 İzmir	Individual

World Games
Silver medal – second place	2013 Cali	Mixed team

European Championships
Gold medal – first place	2012 Amsterdam	Individual
Silver medal – second place	2014 Vagharshapat	Individual
Silver medal – second place	2010 Rovereto	Individual
Silver medal – second place	2012 Amsterdam	Mixed team
Bronze medal – third place	2010 Rovereto	Team

Sergio Pagni (born 26 March 1979 in Lucca), is an Italian compound archer. He has won gold medals at the World Archery Championships, World Cup, Universiade and European Championships and is a former world number one archer.
