= Peter Elzinga (archer) =

Dutch compound archer (born 1981)

Medal record

Men's archery

Representing Netherlands

World Championships
Silver medal – second place	2011 Turin	Mixed Team
Bronze medal – third place	2019 's-Hertogenbosch	Team

World Indoor Championships
Bronze medal – third place	2018 Yankton	Team

World Cup Final
Silver medal – second place	2006 Mérida	Individual

European Archery Championships
Gold medal – first place	2004 Brussels	Individual
Gold medal – first place	2014 Vagharshapat	Individual
Gold medal – first place	2008 Vittel	Men's Team
Gold medal – first place	2012 Amsterdam	Mixed Team
Gold medal – first place	2014 Vagharshapat	Men's Team
Silver medal – second place	2016 Nottingham	Individual
Silver medal – second place	2010 Rovereto	Men's Team
Bronze medal – third place	2010 Rovereto	Individual
Bronze medal – third place	2012 Amsterdam	Men's Team

European Indoor Championships
Gold medal – first place	2004 Sassari	Individual
Gold medal – first place	2008 Turin	Men's Team
Gold medal – first place	2013 Rzeszów	Men's Team
Gold medal – first place	2015 Koper	Men's Team
Silver medal – second place	2008 Turin	Individual
Silver medal – second place	2013 Rzeszów	Individual
Bronze medal – third place	2004 Sassari	Men's Team

Peter Elzinga (born 30 January 1981, Almere), is a Dutch former compound archer. His achievements include becoming the world number one ranked archer in 2004, which position he held for 384 days, and breaking the world record 1440 round with 1419 points in 2009.

Individually, Elzinga won silver in the 2006 World Cup final and one gold in a World Cup stage. With the Dutch team, he won three World Cup stages. At the World Archery Championships he won silver in 2011 with Inge van Caspel in the mixed team, and bronze in 2019 with Mike Schloesser and Sil Pater in the men's team. Elzinga won nine European titles and at least sixteen medals in total at European championships in- and outdoors.

In 2020 he retired as an international athlete and became one of the Dutch national coaches. He replaced former teammate Emiel Custers who took a position at NOC*NSF.
