= Laura Longo =

Italian archer (born 1988)

- Born: 22 August 1988 (age 37); Italy
- Citizenship: Italian
- Occupation: Archer

Laura Longo (born 22 August 1988) is an Italian compound archer. She is the current World Archery number five in women's compound archery. The highest ranking she has reached is the fourth position, which she reached for the last time in April 2012.

== Achievements ==
2007
(bronze) World Indoor Championships, women's team, İzmir
23rd, World Indoor Championships, individual, İzmir
(bronze) World Cup, women's team, Antalya
2008
(bronze) World Indoor Championships, women's team, Rzeszów
17th, World Indoor Championships, individual, Rzeszów
2009
5th, Summer Universiade, individual, Belgrade
7th, Summer Universiade, women's team, Belgrade
(bronze) World Outdoor Championships, individual, Ulsan
9th, World Outdoor Championships, women's team, Ulsan
2010
(silver) European Outdoor Championships, women's team, Rovereto
8th, European Outdoor Championships, individual, Rovereto
(gold) European Grand Prix, individual, Yerevan
(silver) European Grand Prix, mixed team, Moscow
4th, World University Championships, women's team, Shenzhen
4th, World University Championships, mixed team, Shenzhen
6th, World University Championships, individual, Shenzhen
2011
(gold) EMAU Grand Prix, individual, Antalya
(bronze) World Cup, individual, Poreč
(silver) EMAU Grand Prix, women's team, Boé
(silver) World Cup, mixed team, Antalya
5th, World Outdoor Championships, women's team, Turin
57th, World Outdoor Championships, individual, Turin
(bronze) World Cup, individual, Ogden
(bronze) World Cup, individual, Shanghai
5th, World Cup Final, individual, Istanbul
2012
4th, World Indoor Championships, women's team, Las Vegas
8th, World Indoor Championships, individual, Las Vegas
(bronze) World Cup, women's team, Shanghai
(silver) World Cup, women's team, Antalya
(silver) European Outdoor Championships, women's team, Amsterdam
17th, European Outdoor Championships, individual, Amsterdam
