= Eugenia Salvi =

Italian archer (born 1960)

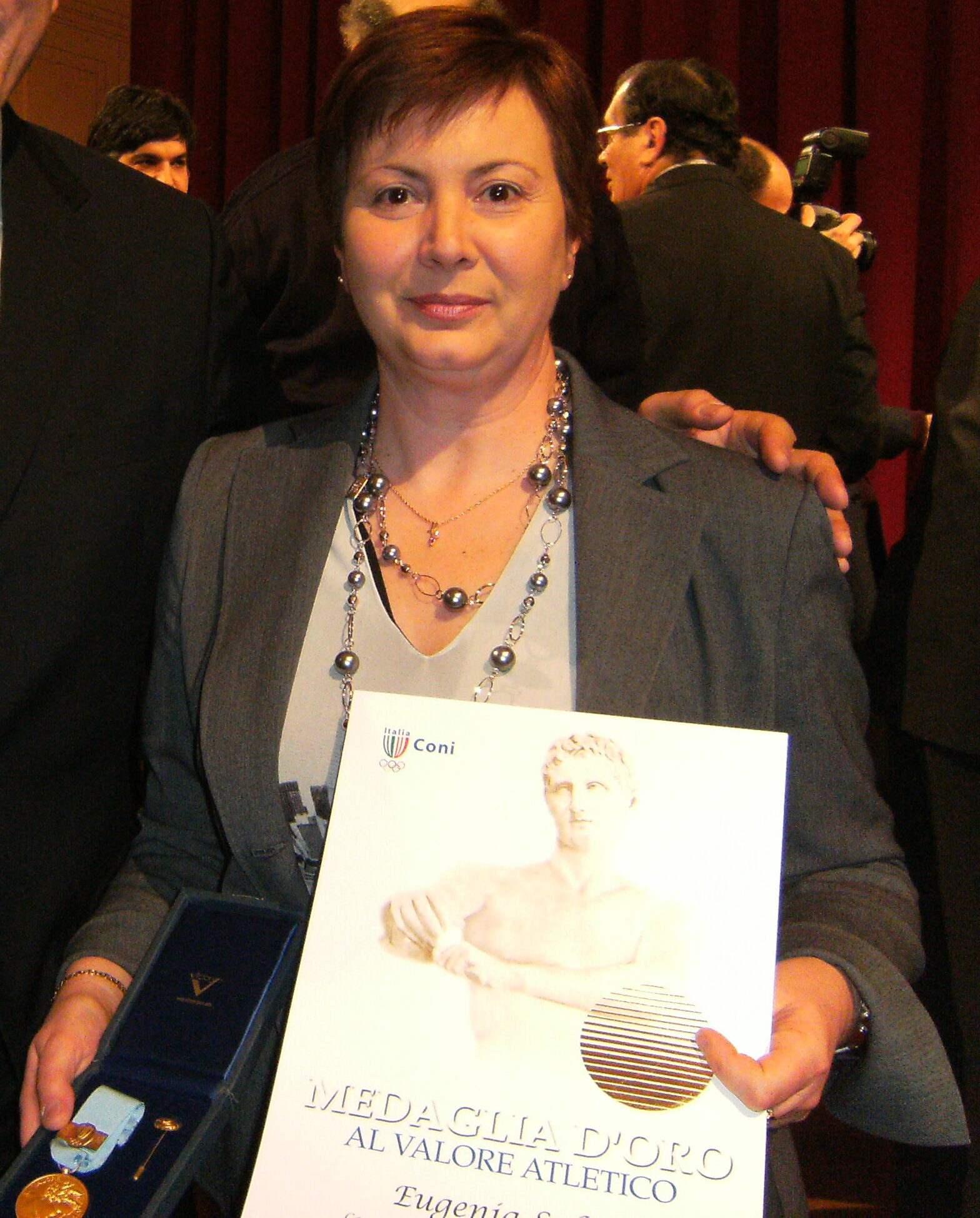
- Salvi in 2008

Medal record

Women's archery

Representing Italy

World Championships
| Gold medal – first place | 2007 Leipzig | Individual |
| Silver medal – second place | 2007 Leipzig | Team |

Indoor World Championships
| Gold medal – first place | 2007 Izmir | Individual |
| Bronze medal – third place | 2009 Rzeszow | Team |

European Archery Championships
| Silver medal – second place | 2010 Rovereto | Team |

Eugenia Salvi (born 22 June 1960 in Castenedolo, Italy) is an athlete from Italy who competes in compound archery.

== Career ==
She took up archery in 1999 and first represented the national senior team in 2002. She has since won individual gold medals at the World Championships and Indoor World Championships, a stage win in Antalya at the 2008 World Cup, and several team medals.
