= Archery at the 2007 Canada Games =

Archery was an event at the 2007 Canada Games held at Porter Creek Secondary School in Whitehorse, Yukon.

== Men compound individual ==
Round of 16
(Ontario) Andrew Charles Fagen	114
(New Brunswick) Zachary R. Branscombe	106
(Ontario) Craig T. Voorn	116
(British Columbia) Jonathan M. Schaefer	112
(Manitoba) Adam Dale Berry	115
(Quebec) Éric Gauthier	113
(Quebec) Gilles Tremblay	115
(British Columbia) Kyle A. Buzikievich	111
(Manitoba) Allan Jeffery Gunter	116
(Saskatchewan) Nolan Johnson	114
(Alberta) Nathan Ross Cameron	113
(Nova Scotia) Shane Ashley Rafuse	110
(Alberta) Tristan C. Lebel	115
(Saskatchewan) Michael Kupchanko	112
(Nova Scotia) Jeff Edward Ryan	111
(New Brunswick) Christopher L. Golden	110

Quarter-finals
(Ontario) Andrew Charles Fagen	113
(Ontario) Craig T. Voorn	113
(Manitoba) Adam Dale Berry	114
(Quebec) Gilles Tremblay	112
(Manitoba) Allan Jeffery Gunter	112
(Alberta) Nathan Ross Cameron	111
(Alberta) Tristan C. Lebel	112
(Nova Scotia) Jeff Edward Ryan	111

Semi-finals
(Ontario) Andrew Charles Fagen	110
(Manitoba) Adam Dale Berry	116
(Manitoba) Allan Jeffery Gunter	111
(Alberta) Tristan C. Lebel	116

Final
(Manitoba) Adam Dale Berry	109
(Alberta) Tristan C. Lebel	110
Bronze medal match
(Ontario) Andrew Charles Fagen	112
(Manitoba) Allan Jeffery Gunter	111

== Women compound individual ==
Round of 16
(Manitoba) Doris Mary Jones	117
(Yukon) Gwendolynn Kristin Cardinal	80
(British Columbia) Erica Helaine Erasmus	112
(Ontario) Dana June Noble	108
(Saskatchewan) Jenah Smith	112
(British Columbia) Katharine Louise Mankowske	110
(Nova Scotia) Rhiannon Jeanette Wyatt	110
(Manitoba) Candace Jeanne McIntosh	109
(Alberta) Ashley Danielle Wallace	114
(Alberta) Samantha Sky Borgal	107
(Nova Scotia) Nicole Rose Theriault	111
(Ontario) Amanda J. Smith-Millar	108
(Quebec) Camille Bouffard Demers	110
(Saskatchewan) Teagan Homeniuk	101
(New Brunswick) Kimberly Elizabeth Maguire	110
(Quebec) Carolyne Dupuis	109

Quarter-finals
(Manitoba) Doris Mary Jones	115
(British Columbia) Erica Helaine Erasmus	114
(Saskatchewan) Jenah Smith	113
(Nova Scotia) Rhiannon Jeanette Wyatt	108
(Alberta) Ashley Danielle Wallace	112
(Nova Scotia) Nicole Rose Theriault	110
(Quebec) Camille Bouffard Demers	113
(New Brunswick) Kimberly Elizabeth Maguire	109

Semi-finals
(Manitoba) Doris Mary Jones	116
(Saskatchewan) Jenah Smith	114
(Alberta) Ashley Danielle Wallace	113
(Quebec) Camille Bouffard Demers	111

Final
(Manitoba) Doris Mary Jones	118
(Alberta) Ashley Danielle Wallace	113
Bronze medal match
(Saskatchewan) Jenah Smith	117
(Quebec) Camille Bouffard Demers	116

== Men team compound ==
Quarter-finals
Ontario	117
New Brunswick	107
Alberta	114
Manitoba	114
Nova Scotia	111
Saskatchewan	111
Quebec	115
British Columbia	110

Semi-finals
Ontario	115
Manitoba	115
Saskatchewan	113
Quebec	111

Final
Ontario	114
Saskatchewan	114
Third place
Manitoba	115
Quebec	113

- Ontario won the Gold/Silver shoot-off 20 points to 19.

== Women team compound ==
Quarter-finals
Manitoba	115
Yukon	88
Alberta	112
Nova Scotia	106
Quebec	110
Saskatchewan	108
British Columbia	112
Ontario	103

Semi-finals
Manitoba	113
Alberta	108
Quebec	111
British Columbia	110

Final
Manitoba	114
Quebec	109
Third place
British Columbia	113
Alberta	110

== Men recurve individual ==
Round of 16
(Quebec) Patrick-Rivest Bunster	115
(Nova Scotia) Michel Paul Maillet	52
(New Brunswick) Keith Ronald Sproul	104
(Saskatchewan) Jonovan Kokan	101
(Ontario) Jordan A. Eastman	112
(Nova Scotia) Blair Christopher Kane	77
(Alberta) Michael Wong	112
(Quebec) Jean-Denis Rousseau	88
(Alberta) Lael Dan Barlow	117
(Manitoba) Ryan Jeffrey Lawrence Quinn	71
(British Columbia) Jonathan Kwok	106
(Saskatchewan) Justin Grimsrud	87
(Ontario) John-David Burnes	115
(Manitoba) Maurice Henri Lesage	101
(New Brunswick) Don Camber MacLean	106
(British Columbia) Jonathan Gordon Russell	97

Quarter-finals
(Quebec) Patrick-Rivest Bunster	115
(New Brunswick) Keith Ronald Sproul	104
(Ontario) Jordan A. Eastman	111
(Alberta) Michael Wong	110
(Alberta) Lael Dan Barlow	111
(British Columbia) Jonathan Kwok	108
(Ontario) John-David Burnes	114
(New Brunswick) Don Camber MacLean	97

Semi-finals
(Quebec) Patrick-Rivest Bunster	118
(Ontario) Jordan A. Eastman	115
(Alberta) Lael Dan Barlow	116
(Ontario) John-David Burnes	108

Final
(Quebec) Patrick-Rivest Bunster	114
(Alberta) Lael Dan Barlow	106
Bronze medal match
(Ontario) John-David Burnes	108
(Ontario) Jordan A. Eastman	104

== Women recurve individual ==
Round of 16
(Quebec) Kristel Alain
BYE
(Manitoba) Avril Coral H. Hatherell	99
(Saskatchewan) Kayla Fawcett	91
(Alberta) Kelsey Bryn Davidson	102
(British Columbia) Stephanie Flinn	86
(Quebec) Felishea Quattrociocche	108
(Yukon) Claire Susanne Rudge	95
(New Brunswick) Christina Lynn Galloway	108
(British Columbia) Alecia Duncan	32
(Manitoba) Joanna Lynn Lachance	109
(Ontario) Vanessa E. Lee	81
(Saskatchewan) Jade Savanna Chipley	109
(Alberta) Lindsay Ann Struthers	95
(Ontario) Meahgan Ann Peters	109
(Yukon) Kristin Marie Clara Van Bibber	39

Quarter-finals
(Quebec) Kristel Alain	110
(Manitoba) Avril Coral H. Hatherell	105
(Alberta) Kelsey Bryn Davidson	105
(Quebec) Felishea Quattrociocche	90
(New Brunswick) Christina Lynn Galloway	106
(Manitoba) Joanna Lynn Lachance	98
(Saskatchewan) Jade Savanna Chipley	107
(Ontario) Meahgan Ann Peters	106

Semi-finals
(Quebec) Kristel Alain	111
(Alberta) Kelsey Bryn Davidson	103
(New Brunswick) Christina Lynn Galloway	106
(Saskatchewan) Jade Savanna Chipley	102

Final
(Quebec) Kristel Alain	107
(New Brunswick) Christina Lynn Galloway	103
Bronze medal match
(Alberta) Kelsey Bryn Davidson	105
(Saskatchewan) Jade Savanna Chipley	100

== Men team recurve ==
Quarter-finals
Alberta	112
Nova Scotia	69
British Columbia	108
New Brunswick	103
Ontario	114
Manitoba	85
Saskatchewan	98
Quebec	97

Semi-finals
Alberta	106
British Columbia	106
Ontario	109
Saskatchewan	96

Final
Alberta	109
Ontario	106
Third place
Saskatchewan	102
Quebec	98

== Women team recurve ==
Quarter-finals
Alberta	94
Yukon	68
Saskatchewan	101
Ontario	90
Manitoba	102
British Columbia	54

Semi-finals
Alberta	96
Saskatchewan	83
Manitoba	104
Quebec	103

Final
Alberta	103
Manitoba	101
Third place
Saskatchewan	104
Quebec	100
