= Archery at the 2010 South American Games – Women's recurve over all distances =

The Women's recurve overall event at the 2010 South American Games summed the four distances contested over March 20 and 21, and served as the qualifying order for the individual event.

== Medalists ==
Gold	Silver	Bronze
Sigrid Romero; Colombia	Natalia Sánchez; Colombia	Leidys Brito; Venezuela

== Results ==
Rank	Athlete	Series				Score
Rank	Athlete	30m	50m	70m	90m	Score
1st place, gold medalist(s)	Sigrid Romero (COL)	344	323	319	312	1298
2nd place, silver medalist(s)	Natalia Sánchez (COL)	344	319	326	308	1297
3rd place, bronze medalist(s)	Leidys Brito (VEN)	342	313	326	309	1290
4	Fernanda Beatriz Faisal (ARG)	341	311	313	307	1272
5	Ana Rendón (COL)	341	307	307	310	1265
6	Denisse van Lamoen (CHI)	343	309	310	299	1261
7	Lisbeth Salazar (VEN)	340	307	315	293	1255
8	Maria Gabriela Goni (ARG)	336	317	299	294	1246
9	Jaileen Bravo (VEN)	337	293	307	300	1237
10	Sarah Nikitin (BRA)	338	293	303	300	1234
11	Michelle Acquesta (BRA)	325	301	298	299	1223
12	Valentina Contreras (COL)	324	287	303	281	1195
13	Ximena Ignacia Mendiberry (ARG)	318	285	302	281	1186
14	Brunna Araujo (BRA)	329	282	290	271	1172
15	Tania Hermosilla (CHI)	327	274	304	261	1166
16	Tanya Mora del Salto (ECU)	318	281	303	257	1159
17	Virginia Conti (ARG)	333	277	259	248	1117
18	Aline Kwamme (BRA)	303	273	293	239	1108
19	Yenire Meza (PAR)	266	246	249	211	972
