= Archery at the 2010 South American Games – Women's recurve 60m =

The Women's recurve 60m event at the 2010 South American Games was held on March 20 at 11:00.

== Medalists ==
Gold	Silver	Bronze
Leidys Brito; Venezuela	Natalia Sánchez; Colombia	Sigrid Romero; Colombia

== Results ==
Rank	Athlete	Series						10s	Xs	Score
Rank	Athlete	1	2	3	4	5	6	10s	Xs	Score
1st place, gold medalist(s)	Leidys Brito (VEN)	55	53	53	57	55	53	11	6	326
2nd place, silver medalist(s)	Natalia Sánchez (COL)	56	51	56	51	55	57	11	4	326
3rd place, bronze medalist(s)	Sigrid Romero (COL)	52	53	55	51	52	56	9	2	319
4	Lisbeth Leoni Salazar (VEN)	53	52	54	53	51	52	11	3	315
5	Fernanda Beatriz Faisal (ARG)	54	53	54	54	49	49	12	3	313
6	Denisse van Lamoen (CHI)	50	55	52	53	51	49	9	3	310
7	Ana Rendón (COL)	52	54	49	54	50	48	7	1	307
8	Jaileen Bravo (VEN)	51	45	51	52	55	53	5	2	307
9	Tania Hermosilla (CHI)	49	48	55	51	48	53	9	2	304
10	Valentina Contreras (COL)	50	49	51	47	52	54	10	1	303
11	Sarah Nikitin (BRA)	49	57	50	51	47	49	7	2	303
12	Tanya Mora del Salto (ECU)	48	45	56	55	49	50	7	1	303
13	Ximena Ignacia Mendiberry (ARG)	49	53	54	47	49	50	8	1	302
14	Maria Gabriela Goni (ARG)	54	51	40	53	52	49	7	1	299
15	Michelle Acquesta (BRA)	44	49	53	50	49	53	3	0	298
16	Aline Kwamme (BRA)	51	48	54	45	50	45	7	1	293
17	Brunna Araujo (BRA)	48	47	50	49	50	46	1	0	290
18	Virginia Conti (ARG)	47	43	42	42	39	46	2	0	259
19	Yenire Meza (PAR)	39	41	46	39	41	43	2	0	249
