= Archery at the 2010 South American Games – Women's recurve 50m =

The Women's recurve 50m event at the 2010 South American Games was held on March 21 at 9:00.

== Medalists ==
| Gold | Silver | Bronze |
|---|---|---|
| Sigrid Romero; Colombia | Natalia Sánchez; Colombia | Maria Gabriela Goni; Argentina |

== Results ==
| Rank | Athlete | Series | | | | | | | | | | | | 10s | Xs | Score |
| Rank | Athlete | 1 | 2 | 3 | 4 | 5 | 6 | 7 | 8 | 9 | 10 | 11 | 12 | 10s | Xs | Score |
|---|---|---|---|---|---|---|---|---|---|---|---|---|---|---|---|---|
| 1st place, gold medalist(s) | Sigrid Romero (COL) | 26 | 26 | 26 | 27 | 25 | 30 | 25 | 29 | 28 | 26 | 26 | 29 | 14 | 4 | 323 |
| 2nd place, silver medalist(s) | Natalia Sánchez (COL) | 23 | 26 | 26 | 26 | 26 | 25 | 28 | 25 | 28 | 29 | 29 | 28 | 11 | 3 | 319 |
| 3rd place, bronze medalist(s) | Maria Gabriela Goni (ARG) | 25 | 24 | 25 | 28 | 28 | 28 | 27 | 27 | 25 | 26 | 27 | 27 | 11 | 3 | 317 |
| 4 | Leidys Brito (VEN) | 25 | 28 | 26 | 26 | 27 | 25 | 26 | 27 | 28 | 23 | 26 | 26 | 3 | 0 | 313 |
| 5 | Fernanda Beatriz Faisal (ARG) | 27 | 27 | 26 | 24 | 28 | 23 | 26 | 26 | 24 | 26 | 26 | 28 | 8 | 4 | 311 |
| 6 | Denisse van Lamoen (CHI) | 23 | 28 | 23 | 26 | 29 | 28 | 25 | 26 | 26 | 24 | 26 | 25 | 7 | 3 | 309 |
| 7 | Ana Rendón (COL) | 26 | 23 | 29 | 25 | 28 | 25 | 21 | 26 | 27 | 23 | 28 | 26 | 9 | 4 | 307 |
| 8 | Lisbeth Salazar (VEN) | 25 | 27 | 26 | 24 | 24 | 25 | 28 | 24 | 25 | 25 | 29 | 25 | 6 | 1 | 307 |
| 9 | Michelle Acquesta (BRA) | 27 | 25 | 22 | 23 | 27 | 27 | 26 | 22 | 27 | 27 | 25 | 23 | 3 | 1 | 301 |
| 10 | Sarah Nikitin (BRA) | 21 | 28 | 30 | 18 | 24 | 25 | 22 | 25 | 26 | 26 | 26 | 22 | 7 | 4 | 293 |
| 11 | Jaileen Bravo (VEN) | 22 | 26 | 24 | 22 | 25 | 26 | 26 | 26 | 26 | 22 | 26 | 22 | 5 | 2 | 293 |
| 12 | Valentina Contreras (COL) | 24 | 23 | 22 | 27 | 26 | 21 | 25 | 24 | 24 | 25 | 26 | 20 | 3 | 0 | 287 |
| 13 | Ximena Ignacia Mendiberry (ARG) | 25 | 26 | 16 | 23 | 24 | 26 | 24 | 26 | 22 | 23 | 22 | 28 | 5 | 1 | 285 |
| 14 | Brunna Araujo (BRA) | 20 | 27 | 26 | 25 | 24 | 22 | 24 | 27 | 25 | 17 | 22 | 23 | 4 | 0 | 282 |
| 15 | Tanya Mora del Salto (ECU) | 26 | 22 | 22 | 21 | 21 | 29 | 22 | 27 | 21 | 22 | 22 | 26 | 6 | 1 | 281 |
| 16 | Virginia Conti (ARG) | 23 | 23 | 23 | 21 | 24 | 26 | 22 | 24 | 20 | 25 | 23 | 23 | 1 | 0 | 277 |
| 17 | Tania Hermosilla (CHI) | 25 | 24 | 23 | 25 | 24 | 25 | 13 | 24 | 25 | 20 | 20 | 26 | 2 | 0 | 274 |
| 18 | Aline Kwamme (BRA) | 21 | 23 | 22 | 21 | 22 | 19 | 21 | 25 | 24 | 23 | 26 | 19 | 2 | 0 | 273 |
| 19 | Yenire Meza (PAR) | 16 | 21 | 24 | 20 | 17 | 23 | 22 | 23 | 19 | 22 | 17 | 22 | 5 | 1 | 246 |
