= Archery at the 2010 South American Games – Women's recurve 30m =

The Women's recurve 30m event at the 2010 South American Games was held on March 21 at 11:15.

== Medalists ==
Gold	Silver	Bronze
Sigrid Romero; Colombia	Natalia Sánchez; Colombia	Maria Gabriela Goni; Argentina

== Results ==
Rank	Athlete	Series												10s	Xs	Score
Rank	Athlete	1	2	3	4	5	6	7	8	9	10	11	12	10s	Xs	Score
1st place, gold medalist(s)	Natalia Sánchez (COL)	28	29	30	28	29	28	29	28	28	29	29	29	21	11	344
2nd place, silver medalist(s)	Sigrid Romero (COL)	28	29	29	29	28	29	29	29	29	29	28	28	20	12	344
3rd place, bronze medalist(s)	Denisse van Lamoen (CHI)	28	29	27	29	28	29	27	30	28	30	29	29	21	9	343
4	Leidys Brito (VEN)	29	28	28	29	30	26	29	29	28	28	29	29	20	5	342
5	Fernanda Beatriz Faisal (ARG)	28	27	29	28	28	29	29	30	29	27	29	28	20	6	341
6	Ana Rendón (COL)	26	30	30	29	28	28	30	28	28	27	28	29	18	9	341
7	Lisbeth Salazar (VEN)	27	28	27	28	29	30	29	28	28	27	30	29	18	11	340
8	Sarah Nikitin (BRA)	25	27	29	29	28	30	28	30	27	29	28	28	18	5	338
9	Jaileen Bravo (VEN)	26	29	29	25	28	29	28	30	29	28	29	27	20	6	337
10	Maria Gabriela Goni (ARG)	28	27	26	28	29	28	29	29	29	28	27	28	16	4	336
11	Virginia Conti (ARG)	27	26	28	30	28	27	27	29	27	27	28	29	16	1	333
12	Brunna Araujo (BRA)	23	25	30	25	28	28	30	27	28	28	27	30	14	4	329
13	Tania Hermosilla (CHI)	25	27	28	27	25	27	30	30	27	27	25	29	15	5	327
14	Michelle Acquesta (BRA)	29	25	25	27	29	28	30	25	29	28	24	26	15	4	325
15	Valentina Contreras (COL)	27	17	28	29	29	28	26	29	28	28	28	27	15	4	324
16	Ximena Ignacia Mendiberry (ARG)	25	25	28	26	28	27	27	29	22	26	27	28	9	0	318
17	Tanya Mora del Salto (ECU)	26	26	27	28	26	27	26	29	26	22	28	27	7	4	318
18	Aline Kwamme (BRA)	28	23	23	25	25	25	27	28	24	23	27	25	5	1	303
19	Yenire Meza (PAR)	15	13	22	23	23	27	29	17	25	25	26	21	5	1	266
