= Archery at the 2010 South American Games =

There were 28 archery events at the 2010 South American Games. Medals were given to each individual distance at the qualifying round, to the overall result at the qualifying round, to the olympic tournament and the team event for recurve and compound bows for men and women.

== Medal table ==
Rank	Nation	Gold	Silver	Bronze	Total
1	Venezuela (VEN)	11	7	7	25
2	Colombia (COL)	8	12	9	29
3	Brazil (BRA)	8	7	6	21
4	Argentina (ARG)	1	1	3	5
5	Chile (CHI)	0	1	3	4
Totals (5 entries)		28	28	28	84

== Medal summary ==
=== Medalists ===
Event	Gold	Silver	Bronze
Men's recurve events
Men's recurve 30m	Bernardo Oliveira; Brazil	Diego Torres; Colombia	Daniel Pacheco; Colombia
Men's recurve 50m	Bernardo Oliveira; Brazil	Diego Torres; Colombia	Luis Paulinyi; Brazil
Men's recurve 70m	Elías Malavé; Venezuela	Fabio Emilio; Brazil	Mauro Ricardo de Mattia; Argentina
Men's recurve 90m	Bernardo Oliveira; Brazil	Enrique Vilchez; Venezuela	Luis Paulinyi; Brazil
Men's recurve over all distances	Bernardo Oliveira; Brazil	Luis Paulinyi; Brazil	Diego Torres; Colombia
Men's recurve individual	Daniel Pacheco; Colombia	Diego Torres; Colombia	Bernardo Oliveira; Brazil
Men's recurve team	Diego Torres; Juan Carlos Dueñas; Daniel Pacheco; Colombia	Luis Paulinyi; Bernardo Oliveira; Fabio Emilio; Brazil	Leonardo Salazar; Enrique Vilchez; Elías Malavé; Venezuela
Men's compound events
Men's compound 30m	Roberval dos Santos; Brazil	Guillermo Aguilar Contreras; Chile	Omar Mejía; Colombia
Men's compound 50m	Claudio Contrucci; Brazil	Roberval dos Santos; Brazil	Gabriel Lee Oliferow; Venezuela
Men's compound 70m	Nelson Eduardo Torres; Venezuela	Pablo Maio; Argentina	Gary Alejandro Hernandez; Venezuela
Men's compound 90m	Nestor Federico Gaute; Argentina	Roberval dos Santos; Brazil	Marcelo Roriz Junior; Brazil
Men's compound over all distances	Roberval dos Santos; Brazil	Nelson Eduardo Torres; Venezuela	Daniel Muñoz; Colombia
Men's compound individual	Nelson Eduardo torres Venezuela	Claudio Contrucci; Brazil	Marcelo Roriz Junior; Brazil
Men's compound team	Gabriel Lee Oliferow; Eduardo Jesus Gonzalez; Gary Alejandro Hernandez; Venezuela	Claudio Contrucci; Marcelo Roriz Junior; Roberval dos Santos; Brazil	Guillermo Aguilar Contreras; Jose Joaquin Santiago; Juan Pablo Luvecce; Chile
Women's recurve events
Women's recurve 30m	Sigrid Romero; Colombia	Natalia Sánchez; Colombia	Denisse van Lamoen; Chile
Women's recurve 50m	Sigrid Romero; Colombia	Natalia Sánchez; Colombia	Maria Gabriela Goni; Argentina
Women's recurve 60m	Leidys Brito; Venezuela	Natalia Sánchez; Colombia	Sigrid Romero; Colombia
Women's recurve 70m	Sigrid Romero; Colombia	Ana Rendón; Colombia	Leidys Brito; Venezuela
Women's recurve over all distances	Sigrid Romero; Colombia	Natalia Sánchez; Colombia	Leidys Brito; Venezuela
Women's recurve individual	Natalia Sánchez; Colombia	Sigrid Romero; Colombia	Denisse van Lamoen; Chile
Women's recurve team	Lisbeth Salazar; Leidys Brito; Jaileen Bravo; Venezuela	Natalia Sánchez; Sigrid Romero; Ana Rendón; Colombia	Maria Gabriela Goni; Fernanda Beatriz Faisal; Ximena Mendiberry; Argentina
Women's compound events
Women's compound 30m	Luzmary Guedez; Venezuela	Carolina Gadban; Colombia	Betty Flores; Venezuela; Isabel Salazar; Colombia
Women's compound 50m	Natalia Londoño; Colombia	Luzmary Guedez; Venezuela	Olga Bosh; Venezuela
Women's compound 60m	Olga Bosh; Venezuela	Betty Flores; Venezuela	Natalia Londoño; Colombia
Women's compound 70m	Luzmary Guedez; Venezuela	Olga Bosh; Venezuela	Natalia Londoño; Colombia
Women's compound over all distances	Luzmary Guedez; Venezuela	Olga Bosh; Venezuela	Natalia Londoño; Colombia
Women's compound individual	Nely Acquesta; Brazil	Luzmary Guedez; Venezuela	Dirma Miranda dos Santos; Brazil
Women's compound team	Olga Bosh; Betty Flores; Luzmary Guedez; Venezuela	Alejandra Usquiano; Natalia Londoño; Isabel Salazar; Colombia	no medal awarded
