= Archery at the 2011 Pan American Games – Women's team =

Archery – Women's team at the 2011 Pan American Games
- Venue: Pan American Archery Stadium
- Dates: October 17 – 21
- Competitors: 30 from 10 nations

Medalists
Gold medal	Aida Roman; Alejandra Valencia; Mariana Avitia	Mexico
Silver medal	Khatuna Lorig; Miranda Leek; Heather Koehl	United States
Bronze medal	Maydenia Sarduy; Orquidea Quesada; Larissa Paga	Cuba

The women's team archery event at the 2011 Pan American Games was held between October 17–21 at the Pan American Archery Stadium in Guadalajara. The defending Pan American Games champion was Ana Rendón, Sigrid Romero and Natalia Sánchez of Colombia.

== Schedule ==
All times are Central Standard Time (UTC-6).

Date	Time	Round
October 17, 2011	10:30	Qualification
October 18, 2011	10:30	Qualification
October 21, 2011	10:30	Quarterfinals
October 21, 2011	11:00	Semifinals
October 21, 2011	13:14	Final

== Results ==
=== Qualification ===
30 competitors from 10 nations competed.

Rank	Country		Total
Rank	Competitor	Score	Total
1	Mexico		3988 PR
1	Aida Roman	1357	3988 PR
1	Alejandra Valencia	1363	3988 PR
1	Mariana Avitia	1268	3988 PR
2	United States		3956
2	Khatuna Lorig	1326	3956
2	Miranda Leek	1361	3956
2	Heather Koehl	1269	3956
3	Venezuela		3788
3	Yerubi Suarez	1206	3788
3	Leidys Brito	1323	3788
3	Saraneth Rivera	1259	3788
4	Canada		3785
4	Marie-Pier Beaudet	1289	3785
4	Vanessa Lee	1210	3785
4	Kateri Vrakking	1286	3785
5	Cuba		3750
5	Maydenia Sarduy	1266	3750
5	Orquidea Quesada	1233	3750
5	Larissa Paga	1251	3750
6	Argentina		3731
6	Fernand Faisal	1207	3731
6	Maria Goni	1282	3731
6	Ximena Mendiberry	1242	3731
7	Chile		3668
7	Murielle Deschamps	1214	3668
7	Sophia Moraga	1174	3668
7	Denisse van Lamoen	1280	3668
8	Puerto Rico		3649
8	Maria Cardoza	1232	3649
8	Ambar Reyes	1158	3649
8	Nadya Ruiz	1259	3649
9	Colombia		3639
9	Valentina Contreras	1187	3639
9	María Echavarria	1190	3639
9	Paola Ramirez	1262	3639
10	Brazil		3625
10	Sarah Nikitin	1234	3625
10	Fatima Rocha de Carvalho	1197	3625
10	Michelle Acquesta	1194	3625

=== Elimination rounds ===
First Round
9	Colombia	212
8	Puerto Rico	194
7	Chile	193
10	Brazil	186

Quarterfinals
1	Mexico	215; PR
9	Colombia	204
5	Cuba	199
4	Canada	197
3	Venezuela	198
6	Argentina	191
7	Chile	201
2	United States	202

Semifinals
1	Mexico	215
5	Cuba	197
3	Venezuela	204
2	United States	211

Finals
1	Mexico	215
2	United States	204
Third place
5	Cuba	201
3	Venezuela	198
