= Archery at the 2010 South American Games – Women's recurve individual =

The women's individual recurve event at the 2010 South American Games was held on March 23, beginning at 9:30 and ending at 12:10, with the main final.

== Medalists ==
Gold	Silver	Bronze
Natalia Sánchez; Colombia	Sigrid Romero; Colombia	Denisse van Lamoen; Chile

== Results ==
=== Finals ===
Semifinals
1	Sigrid Romero (COL)	105
5	Ana Rendón (COL)	104
6	Denisse van Lamoen (CHI)	103
2	Natalia Sánchez (COL)	106

Final
1	Sigrid Romero (COL)	105
2	Natalia Sánchez (COL)	108
Third place
5	Ana Rendón (COL)	98
6	Denisse van Lamoen (CHI)	99

=== Top half ===
First Round
17	Virginia Conti (ARG)	83
16	Tanya Mora del Salto (ECU)	101

Second Round
1	Sigrid Romero (COL)	107
16	Tanya Mora del Salto (ECU)	100
9	Jaileen Bravo (VEN)	99
8	Maria Gabriela Goni (ARG)	104
5	Ana Rendón (COL)	104
12	Valentina Contreras (COL)	94
13	Ximena Ignacia Mendiberry (ARG)	104
4	Fernanda Beatriz Faisal (ARG)	101

Quarterfinals
1	Sigrid Romero (COL)	111
8	Maria Gabriela Goni (ARG)	106
5	Ana Rendón (COL)	111
13	Ximena Ignacia Mendiberry (ARG)	89

Semifinals
1	Sigrid Romero (COL)	105
5	Ana Rendón (COL)	104

=== Bottom half ===
First Round
19	Yenire Meza (PAR)	73
14	Brunna Araujo (BRA)	95
15	Tania Hermosilla (CHI)	97
18	Aline Kwamme (BRA)	92

Second Round
3	Leidya Brito (VEN)	105
14	Brunna Araujo (BRA)	95
11	Michelle Acquesta (BRA)	98
6	Denisse van Lamoen (CHI)	106
7	Lisbeth Salazar (VEN)	103
10	Sarah Nikitin (BRA)	91
15	Tania Hermosilla (CHI)	93
2	Natalia Sánchez (COL)	102

Quarterfinals
3	Leidya Brito (VEN)	106
6	Denisse van Lamoen (CHI)	107
7	Lisbeth Salazar (VEN)	106
2	Natalia Sánchez (COL)	111

Semifinals
6	Denisse van Lamoen (CHI)	103
2	Natalia Sánchez (COL)	106

== Bibliography ==
- Report
