= Archery at the 2010 South American Games – Women's recurve 70m =

The Women's recurve 70m event at the 2010 South American Games was held on March 20 at 9:00.

== Medalists ==
Gold	Silver	Bronze
Sigrid Romero; Colombia	Ana Rendón; Colombia	Leidys Brito; Venezuela

== Results ==
Rank	Athlete	Series						10s	Xs	Score
Rank	Athlete	1	2	3	4	5	6	10s	Xs	Score
1st place, gold medalist(s)	Sigrid Romero (COL)	54	52	52	55	54	45	9	3	312
2nd place, silver medalist(s)	Ana Rendón (COL)	52	54	53	53	47	51	9	1	310
3rd place, bronze medalist(s)	Leidys Brito (VEN)	51	46	53	56	54	49	7	0	309
4	Natalia Sánchez (COL)	51	54	52	53	46	52	9	2	308
5	Fernanda Beatriz Faisal (ARG)	53	53	51	48	50	52	5	3	307
6	Sarah Nikitin (BRA)	51	50	55	49	53	42	9	5	300
7	Jaileen Bravo (VEN)	50	53	49	43	53	52	7	4	300
8	Michelle Acquesta (BRA)	51	52	52	50	51	43	7	2	299
9	Denisse van Lamoen (CHI)	49	51	51	47	46	55	5	0	299
10	Maria Gabriela Goni (ARG)	52	44	49	47	53	49	3	2	294
11	Lisbeth Leoni Salazar (VEN)	54	40	47	53	50	49	5	2	293
12	Ximena Ignacia Mendiberry (ARG)	45	50	50	47	43	46	4	2	281
13	Valentina Contreras (COL)	47	44	49	49	46	46	2	0	281
14	Brunna Araujo (BRA)	47	53	45	47	37	42	4	0	271
15	Tania Hermosilla (CHI)	41	39	46	48	42	45	5	0	261
16	Tanya Mora del Salto (ECU)	43	35	48	46	39	46	1	0	257
17	Virginia Conti (ARG)	46	37	44	34	50	37	2	1	248
18	Aline Kwamme (BRA)	38	44	43	30	41	43	2	1	239
19	Yenire Meza (PAR)	28	47	44	29	32	31	0	0	211
