= Archery at the 2011 Pan American Games – Women's individual =

Archery – Women's individual at the 2011 Pan American Games
- Venue: Pan American Archery Stadium
- Dates: October 17 - October 22
- Competitors: 32 from 12 nations

Medalists
Gold medal	Alejandra Valencia	Mexico
Silver medal	Miranda Leek	United States
Bronze medal	Aida Roman	Mexico

The women's individual competition of the archery events at the 2011 Pan American Games was held between October 17 and 22 at the Pan American Archery Stadium. The defending Pan American Games champion was Jennifer Nichols of the United States.

== Schedule ==
All times are Central Standard Time (UTC-6).

Date	Time	Round
October 17, 2011	10:30	Qualification
October 18, 2011	10:30	Qualification
October 19, 2011	10:00	Sixteenth, eight and quarterfinals.
October 22, 2011	10:00	Semifinals/Finals

== Results ==
=== Ranking round ===
Seed	Archer	Score	Seed	Archer	Score
1	Alejandra Valencia (MEX)	1363 PR	17	Lya Solano (DOM)	1249
2	Miranda Leek (USA)	1361	18	Ximena Mendiberry (ARG)	1242
3	Aida Roman (MEX)	1357	19	Sarah Nikitin (BRA)	1234
4	Khatuna Lorig (USA)	1326	20	Orquidea Quesada (CUB)	1233
5	Leidys Brito (VEN)	1323	21	Maria Cardoza (PUR)	1232
6	Marie-Pier Beaudet (CAN)	1289	22	Stefania Mora (ECU)	1215
7	Kateri Vrakking (CAN)	1286	23	Murielle Deschamps (CHI)	1214
8	Maria Goni (ARG)	1282	24	Vanessa Lee (CAN)	1210
9	Denisse van Lamoen (CHI)	1280	25	Fernanda Faisal (ARG)	1207
10	Heather Koehl (USA)	1269	26	Yerubi Suarez (VEN)	1206
11	Mariana Avitia (MEX)	1268	27	Fatima Rocha de Carvalho (BRA)	1197
12	Maydenia Sarduy (CUB)	1266	28	Michell Aquesta (BRA)	1194
13	Paola Ramirez (COL)	1262	29	Maria Echavarria (COL)	1190
14	Saraneth Rivera (VEN)	1259	30	Valentina Contreras (COL)	1187
15	Nadya Ruiz (PUR)	1259	31	Sophia Moraga (CHI)	1174
16	Larissa Pagan (CUB)	1251	32	Ambar Reyes (PUR)	1158

=== Competition rounds ===
==== Finals ====
Semifinals
Alejandra Valencia (MEX)	6
Leidys Brito (VEN)	2
Aida Roman (MEX)	2
Miranda Leek (USA)	6

Final
Alejandra Valencia (MEX)	6
Miranda Leek (USA)	2
Bronze medal match
Leidys Brito (VEN)	1
Aida Roman (MEX)	7

==== Top half ====
Round of 32
1	Alejandra Valencia (MEX)	6
32	Ambar Reyes (PUR)	0
17	Lya Solano (DOM)	5
16	Larissa Pagan (CUB)	6
9	Denisse van Lamoen (CHI)	6
24	Vanessa Lee (CAN)	2
25	Fernanda Faisal (ARG)	2
8	Maria Goni (ARG)	6
5	Leidys Brito (VEN)	7
28	Michelle Acquesta (BRA)	1
21	Maria Cardoza (PUR)	6
12	Maydenia Sarduy (CUB)	4
13	Paola Ramirez (COL)	6
20	Orquidea Quesada (CUB)	4
29	Maria Echavarria (COL)	2
4	Khatuna Lorig (USA)	6

Round of 16
1	Alejandra Valencia (MEX)	7
16	Larissa Paga (CUB)	1
9	Denisse van Lamoen (CHI)	6
8	Maria Goni (ARG)	4
5	Leidys Brito (VEN)	7
21	Maria Cardoza (PUR)	1
13	Paola Ramirez (COL)	6
4	Khatuna Lorig (USA)	5

Quarterfinals
1	Alejandra Valencia (MEX)	6
9	Denisse van Lamoen (CHI)	5
5	Leidys Brito (VEN)	6
13	Paola Ramirez (COL)	2

Semifinals
1	Alejandra Valencia (MEX)	6
5	Leidys Brito (VEN)	2

==== Bottom half ====
Round of 32
3	Aida Roman (MEX)	6
30	Valentina Contreras (COL)	2
19	Sarah Nikitin (BRA)	7
14	Saraneth Rivera (VEN)	3
11	Mariana Avitia (MEX)	6
22	Stefania Mora (ECU)	2
27	Fatima Rocha de Carvalho (BRA)	0
6	Marie-Pier Beaudet (CAN)	6
7	Kateri Vrakking (CAN)	6
26	Yerubi Suarez (VEN)	0
23	Murielle Deschamps (CHI)	5
10	Heather Koehl (USA)	6
15	Nadya Ruiz (PUR)	6
18	Ximena Mendiberry (ARG)	0
31	Sophia Moraga (CHI)	0
2	Miranda Leek (USA)	6

Round of 16
3	Aida Roman (MEX)	6
19	Sarah Nikitin (BRA)	2
11	Mariana Avita (MEX)	3
6	Marie-Pier Beaudet (CAN)	7
7	Kateri Vrakking (CAN)	6
10	Heather Koehl (USA)	4
15	Nadya Ruiz (PUR)	1
2	Miranda Leek (USA)	7

Quarterfinals
3	Aida Roman (MEX)	6
6	Marie-Pier Beaudet (CAN)	0
7	Kateri Vrakking (CAN)	2
2	Miranda Leek (USA)	6

Semifinals
3	Aida Roman (MEX)	2
2	Miranda Leek (USA)	6
