= Archery at the 2010 South American Games – Women's recurve team =

The Women's recurve team event at the 2010 South American Games had its qualification during the individual qualification on March 21, and the finals on March 24.

== Medalists ==
Gold	Silver	Bronze
Lisbeth Salazar; Leidys Brito; Jaileen Bravo; Venezuela	Natalia Sánchez; Sigrid Romero; Ana Rendón; Colombia	Maria Gabriela Goni; Fernanda Beatriz Faisal; Ximena Mendiberry; Argentina

== Results ==
=== Qualification ===
Rank	Team	Score
1	Colombia	3860
1	Sigrid Romero	1298
1	Natalia Sánchez	1297
1	Ana Rendón	1265
2	Venezuela	3635
2	Leidys Brito	1290
2	Lisbeth Salazar	1255
2	Jaileen Bravo	1237
3	Argentina	3620
3	Fernanda Beatriz Faisal	1272
3	Maria Gabriela Goni	1246
3	Ximena Mendiberry	1186
4	Brazil	3472
4	Sarah Nikitin	1234
4	Brunna Araujo	1172
4	Aline Kwamme	1108

=== Draw ===
Semifinals
1	Colombia	214
4	Brazil	189
3	Argentina	195
2	Venezuela	205

Finals
1	Colombia	194
2	Venezuela	196
Third place
4	Brazil	185
3	Argentina	196
