= Archery at the 2010 South American Games – Women's compound 70m =

The Women's compound 70m event at the 2010 South American Games was held on March 20 at 9:00.

== Medalists ==
Gold	Silver	Bronze
Luzmary Guedez; Venezuela	Olga Bosh; Venezuela	Natalia Londoño; Colombia

== Results ==
Rank	Athlete	Series						10s	Xs	Score
Rank	Athlete	1	2	3	4	5	6	10s	Xs	Score
1st place, gold medalist(s)	Luzmary Guedez (VEN)	55	55	56	55	58	54	12	7	333
2nd place, silver medalist(s)	Olga Bosh (VEN)	56	54	56	56	57	53	16	4	332
3rd place, bronze medalist(s)	Natalia Londoño (COL)	55	57	55	55	55	54	14	4	331
4	Nely Acquesta (BRA)	55	54	53	56	56	55	11	6	329
5	Talita Araujo (BRA)	51	56	53	55	55	56	9	2	326
6	Dirma Miranda dos Santos (BRA)	49	56	56	55	54	55	13	6	325
7	Betty Flores (VEN)	55	56	55	52	52	55	12	6	325
8	Alejandra Usquiano (COL)	57	56	54	53	52	52	11	4	324
9	Carolina Montes (VEN)	51	56	56	55	53	53	9	2	324
10	Cintia Beatriz Mereles (ARG)	54	56	51	57	52	53	9	2	323
11	Isabel Salazar (COL)	57	54	53	56	47	50	10	2	317
12	Sara Germania Drouet (ECU)	52	50	48	56	56	53	12	2	315
13	Carolina Gadban (COL)	51	53	49	51	53	50	3	0	307
14	Daniela Areias (BRA)	51	50	52	52	51	49	9	3	305
15	Vanina Cecilia Backis (ARG)	48	51	52	53	47	52	6	4	303
