= Archery at the 2010 South American Games – Men's recurve 50m =

The Men's recurve 50m event at the 2010 South American Games was held on March 21 at 9:00.

== Medalists ==
| Gold | Silver | Bronze |
|---|---|---|
| Bernardo Oliveira; Brazil | Diego Torres; Colombia | Luis Paulinyi; Brazil |

== Results ==
| Rank | Athlete | Series | | | | | | | | | | | | 10s | Xs | Score |
| Rank | Athlete | 1 | 2 | 3 | 4 | 5 | 6 | 7 | 8 | 9 | 10 | 11 | 12 | 10s | Xs | Score |
|---|---|---|---|---|---|---|---|---|---|---|---|---|---|---|---|---|
| 1st place, gold medalist(s) | Bernardo Oliveira (BRA) | 28 | 27 | 25 | 27 | 27 | 27 | 28 | 27 | 29 | 26 | 26 | 29 | 11 | 3 | 326 |
| 2nd place, silver medalist(s) | Diego Torres (COL) | 28 | 25 | 26 | 26 | 27 | 28 | 25 | 27 | 28 | 26 | 28 | 29 | 10 | 4 | 323 |
| 3rd place, bronze medalist(s) | Luis Paulinyi (BRA) | 29 | 27 | 25 | 28 | 26 | 25 | 28 | 27 | 28 | 25 | 29 | 24 | 13 | 4 | 321 |
| 4 | Mario Humberto Gomes (CHI) | 27 | 21 | 28 | 27 | 25 | 26 | 27 | 28 | 28 | 29 | 29 | 25 | 10 | 4 | 320 |
| 5 | Daniel Pineda (COL) | 27 | 29 | 24 | 28 | 27 | 29 | 28 | 26 | 25 | 27 | 23 | 25 | 13 | 7 | 318 |
| 6 | Enrique Vilchez (VEN) | 24 | 21 | 28 | 30 | 24 | 26 | 27 | 26 | 27 | 25 | 25 | 30 | 9 | 2 | 313 |
| 7 | Daniel Pacheco (COL) | 26 | 26 | 24 | 28 | 23 | 23 | 25 | 24 | 29 | 25 | 28 | 26 | 6 | 2 | 307 |
| 8 | Fabio Emilio (BRA) | 26 | 20 | 25 | 25 | 27 | 27 | 23 | 28 | 25 | 29 | 24 | 27 | 9 | 4 | 306 |
| 9 | Christian Alejandro Arata (CHI) | 27 | 25 | 25 | 26 | 25 | 24 | 26 | 24 | 26 | 25 | 26 | 24 | 4 | 2 | 303 |
| 10 | Elías Malavé (VEN) | 25 | 26 | 27 | 24 | 26 | 21 | 28 | 26 | 16 | 29 | 28 | 25 | 7 | 2 | 301 |
| 11 | Leonardo Salazar (VEN) | 24 | 25 | 24 | 21 | 26 | 24 | 22 | 29 | 25 | 27 | 27 | 27 | 5 | 1 | 301 |
| 12 | Juan Tomasini (URU) | 23 | 21 | 24 | 27 | 24 | 27 | 27 | 29 | 22 | 24 | 27 | 25 | 5 | 3 | 300 |
| 13 | Dario Javier Tipan (ECU) | 26 | 26 | 22 | 26 | 24 | 25 | 24 | 25 | 23 | 28 | 23 | 28 | 5 | 2 | 300 |
| 14 | Marcos Bortoloto (BRA) | 22 | 28 | 25 | 18 | 27 | 21 | 26 | 27 | 29 | 22 | 26 | 27 | 7 | 1 | 298 |
| 15 | Luciano Damian Herenuz (ARG) | 25 | 26 | 27 | 21 | 25 | 21 | 23 | 25 | 28 | 23 | 26 | 26 | 7 | 0 | 296 |
| 16 | Diego Enrique Marino (ECU) | 25 | 22 | 24 | 20 | 27 | 25 | 25 | 23 | 23 | 27 | 25 | 25 | 7 | 4 | 291 |
| 17 | Mauro Ricardo de Mattia (ARG) | 26 | 26 | 25 | 22 | 21 | 24 | 24 | 24 | 24 | 24 | 22 | 27 | 2 | 0 | 289 |
| 18 | Juan Carlos Dueñas (COL) | 19 | 24 | 22 | 21 | 26 | 25 | 26 | 26 | 21 | 27 | 23 | 25 | 5 | 3 | 285 |
| 19 | Alvaro Ignacio Carcamo (CHI) | 21 | 22 | 24 | 23 | 23 | 24 | 24 | 23 | 22 | 21 | 29 | 27 | 6 | 4 | 283 |
| 20 | Emilio Martin Bermudez (ECU) | 20 | 26 | 24 | 26 | 24 | 21 | 23 | 17 | 28 | 23 | 26 | 23 | 5 | 2 | 281 |
| 21 | Jorge Eduardo Cabrera (ARG) | 26 | 17 | 24 | 25 | 22 | 24 | 23 | 24 | 20 | 27 | 24 | 24 | 3 | 2 | 280 |
| 22 | Genaro David Riccio (ARG) | 25 | 25 | 25 | 15 | 24 | 25 | 25 | 24 | 21 | 23 | 25 | 22 | 6 | 1 | 279 |
| 23 | Rodrigo Javier Garcete (PAR) | 27 | 24 | 14 | 16 | 15 | 15 | 20 | 19 | 21 | 17 | 12 | 14 | 3 | 1 | 214 |
