= Archery at the 2010 South American Games – Men's recurve 90m =

The Men's recurve 90m event at the 2010 South American Games was held on March 20 at 9:00.

== Medalists ==
Gold	Silver	Bronze
Bernardo Oliveira; Brazil	Enrique Vilchez; Venezuela	Luis Paulinyi; Brazil

== Results ==
Rank	Athlete	Series						10s	Xs	Score
Rank	Athlete	1	2	3	4	5	6	10s	Xs	Score
1st place, gold medalist(s)	Bernardo Oliveira (BRA)	42	47	49	54	46	49	4	1	287
2nd place, silver medalist(s)	Enrique Vilchez (VEN)	52	45	34	48	47	53	8	3	289
3rd place, bronze medalist(s)	Luis Paulinyi (BRA)	50	47	41	48	45	48	6	3	279
4	Genaro Riccio (ARG)	49	46	44	40	45	52	4	2	276
5	Daniel Pacheco (COL)	45	42	51	52	46	40	2	0	276
6	Mario Humberto Gomez (CHI)	44	51	53	43	41	42	1	0	274
7	Marcos Bortoloto (BRA)	49	39	47	40	46	52	7	2	273
8	Diego Torres (COL)	49	43	47	46	48	36	1	0	269
9	Leonardo Salazar (VEN)	39	50	52	43	42	40	5	1	266
10	Elías Malavé (VEN)	47	46	48	42	44	39	3	1	266
11	Fábio Emilio (BRA)	47	38	44	41	44	50	3	0	264
12	Juan Carlos Dueñas (COL)	40	37	44	46	47	49	3	0	263
13	Daniel Pineda (COL)	35	53	42	43	44	46	2	1	263
14	Juan Tomasini (URU)	39	53	46	43	42	38	4	1	261
15	Jorge Eduardo Cabrera (ARG)	39	44	38	44	38	55	2	0	258
16	Christian Arata (CHI)	35	44	45	39	44	48	1	1	255
17	Mauro Ricardo de Mattia (ARG)	39	41	38	44	47	40	2	1	249
18	Luciano Herenuz (ARG)	40	42	31	43	39	46	2	1	241
19	Diego Enrique Marino (ECU)	41	39	42	38	38	41	1	1	239
20	Emilio Martin Bermudez (ECU)	33	41	36	38	43	41	1	0	232
21	Dario Tipan (ECU)	46	43	32	40	33	37	1	0	231
22	Alvaro Ignacio Carcamo (CHI)	32	41	35	31	39	32	1	0	210
23	Rodrigo Javier Garcete (PAR)	23	28	27	36	15	30	1	0	159
