= Archery at the 2010 South American Games – Women's compound 30m =

The Women's compound 30m event at the 2010 South American Games was held on March 21 at 11:15.

== Medalists ==
Gold	Silver	Bronze
Luzmary Guedez; Venezuela	Carolina Gadban; Colombia	Betty Flores; Venezuela; Isabel Salazar; Colombia

== Results ==
Rank	Athlete	Series												10s	Xs	Score
Rank	Athlete	1	2	3	4	5	6	7	8	9	10	11	12	10s	Xs	Score
1st place, gold medalist(s)	Luzmary Guedez (VEN)	30	29	30	30	29	30	30	30	30	30	29	30	33	16	357
2nd place, silver medalist(s)	Carolina Gadban (COL)	30	28	29	30	30	30	29	30	30	29	30	29	30	17	354
3rd place, bronze medalist(s)	Betty Flores (VEN)	28	29	30	30	29	29	30	30	29	30	30	29	29	12	353
3rd place, bronze medalist(s)	Isabel Salazar (COL)	29	29	29	29	29	29	30	30	29	30	30	30	29	12	353
5	Olga Bosh (VEN)	30	29	29	30	29	30	30	29	30	29	28	30	29	11	353
6	Dirma Miranda dos Santos (BRA)	29	28	30	30	29	30	30	29	29	29	29	30	28	13	352
7	Natalia Londoño (COL)	28	29	30	29	29	29	28	30	29	30	30	30	28	14	351
8	Daniela Areias (BRA)	28	29	29	29	29	30	30	28	30	29	29	30	27	12	350
9	Talita Araujo (BRA)	30	29	29	29	29	28	29	29	30	29	30	29	26	14	350
10	Nely Acquesta (BRA)	30	28	30	30	29	29	30	28	28	29	29	30	26	11	350
11	Carolina Montes (VEN)	30	30	29	28	27	28	30	30	30	29	29	28	24	12	348
12	Cintia Beatriz Mereles (ARG)	29	29	30	29	29	27	28	29	27	28	29	29	20	9	343
13	Sara Germania Drouet (ECU)	30	27	29	28	27	28	28	29	29	30	29	29	20	8	343
14	Vanina Cecilia Backis (ARG)	28	28	28	29	20	30	29	30	29	29	28	29	24	10	337
15	Alejandra Usquiano (COL)	26	29	29	28	26	27	28	28	28	26	26	24	12	3	325
