= Archery at the 2010 South American Games – Men's recurve 30m =

The Men's recurve 30m event at the 2010 South American Games was held on March 21 at 11:15.

== Medalists ==
Gold	Silver	Bronze
Bernardo Oliveira; Brazil	Diego Torres; Colombia	Daniel Pacheco; Colombia

== Results ==
Rank	Athlete	Series												10s	Xs	Score
Rank	Athlete	1	2	3	4	5	6	7	8	9	10	11	12	10s	Xs	Score
1st place, gold medalist(s)	Bernardo Oliveira (BRA)	29	29	28	30	29	30	29	29	30	30	28	30	28	11	351
2nd place, silver medalist(s)	Diego Torres (COL)	28	26	29	29	28	28	29	29	29	30	30	29	21	11	344
3rd place, bronze medalist(s)	Daniel Pacheco (COL)	29	28	27	29	28	28	30	29	28	29	29	29	19	9	343
4	Daniel Pineda (COL)	29	29	28	29	28	29	28	28	27	29	28	30	20	8	342
5	Leonardo Salazar (VEN)	28	29	27	29	28	30	29	29	27	27	30	26	17	6	339
6	Mario Humberto Gomes (CHI)	30	29	28	29	29	27	26	28	28	28	28	28	17	5	338
7	Luis Paulinyi (BRA)	29	27	27	28	29	27	28	28	30	30	27	28	16	3	338
8	Fabio Emilio (BRA)	29	29	19	25	28	30	29	30	29	29	27	30	21	4	334
9	Juan Carlos Dueñas (COL)	28	27	27	28	28	25	28	28	29	26	29	30	15	9	333
10	Enrique Vilchez (VEN)	25	26	29	28	29	27	29	27	27	29	28	29	14	3	333
11	Genaro David Riccio (ARG)	30	28	27	27	27	26	29	28	29	27	25	29	15	5	332
12	Marcos Bortoloto (BRA)	26	28	27	29	28	29	29	26	27	28	28	27	14	7	332
13	Elías Malavé (VEN)	27	28	27	29	28	28	28	28	19	29	30	30	19	6	331
14	Luciano Damian Herenuz (ARG)	28	26	25	27	28	30	26	29	27	28	29	26	13	4	329
15	Dario Javier Tipan (ECU)	28	28	27	28	26	28	27	29	27	28	25	28	11	5	329
16	Christian Alejandro Arata (CHI)	27	27	29	26	27	28	28	28	29	27	27	25	12	4	328
17	Juan Tomasini (URU)	24	29	27	26	29	27	26	29	24	28	29	28	13	3	326
18	Jorge Eduardo Cabrera (ARG)	28	26	27	28	23	28	27	27	28	28	25	29	11	3	324
19	Mauro Ricardo de Mattia (ARG)	27	26	28	26	26	26	27	27	29	28	28	26	9	2	324
20	Diego Enrique Marino (ECU)	25	27	23	29	18	26	28	27	27	27	30	28	12	4	315
21	Alvaro Ignacio Carcamo (CHI)	29	26	26	28	27	22	29	27	26	28	23	24	10	3	315
22	Emilio Martin Bermudez (ECU)	17	27	24	28	29	26	25	25	25	29	27	27	7	3	309
23	Rodrigo Javier Garcete (PAR)	19	26	22	22	22	18	23	23	14	18	15	24	3	2	246
