= Archery at the 2015 Pan American Games – Women's team =

Archery – Women's team at the 2015 Pan American Games
- Venue: Varsity Stadium
- Dates: July 14–17
- Competitors: 27 from 9 nations

Medalists
Gold medal	Ana Rendón; Natalia Sánchez; Maira Sepúlveda	Colombia
Silver medal	Karla Hinojosa; Aída Román; Alejandra Valencia	Mexico
Bronze medal	Ariel Gibilaro; Khatuna Lorig; La Nola Pritchard	United States

The women's team competition of the archery events at the 2015 Pan American Games was held between July 14 and 18 at the Varsity Stadium. The defending Pan American Games champions were Mexico.

== Schedule ==
All times are Central Standard Time (UTC-6).

Date	Time	Round
July 14, 2015	10:00	Qualification
July 17, 2015	10:00	Round of 16
July 17, 2015	10:30	Quarterfinals
July 17, 2015	11:30	Semifinals
July 17, 2015	12:15	Finals

== Results ==
=== Qualification ===
Rank	Nation	Archers	Score Ind	Score Team	Note
1	Mexico	Karla Hinojosa; Aída Román; Alejandra Valencia	651; 655; 655	1961	
2	United States	Ariel Gibilaro; Khatuna Lorig; La Nola Pritchard	646; 651; 623	1920	
3	Colombia	Ana Rendón; Natalia Sánchez; Maira Sepúlveda	630; 646; 601	1877	
4	Brazil	Ane Marcelle Dos Santos; Larissa Feitosa; Sarah Nikitin	630; 619; 618	1867	
5	Venezuela	Leidys Brito; Mayra Méndez; Verona Villegas	639; 590; 594	1823	
6	Canada	Virginie Chénier; Georcy-Stephanie Thiffeault Picard; Kateri Vrakking	600; 609; 612	1821	
7	Cuba	Lorisglenis Ojea; Elizabeth Rodriguez; Maydenia Sarduy	581; 597; 630	1808	
8	Argentina	Fernanda Faisal; Florencia Leithold Juarez; Ximena Mendiberry	565; 577; 600	1742	
9	Chile	Keiko Chang; Tania Maldonado; Ignacia Marquez	564; 587; 585	1736	

=== Elimination rounds ===
Round of 16
9	Chile	2	2	2
8	Argentina	0	0	0

Quarterfinals
1	Mexico	2	2	2
9	Chile	0	0	0
5	Venezuela	2	2	1
4	Brazil	0	0	1
3	Colombia	2	1	2
6	Canada	0	1	0
7	Cuba	0	2	1	0
2	United States	2	0	1	2

Semifinals
1	Mexico	0	2	2	2
5	Venezuela	2	0	0	0
3	Colombia	2	2	0	2
2	United States	0	0	2	0

Finals
1	Mexico	0	0	1
3	Colombia	2	2	1
Third place
5	Venezuela	0	2	0	2	0
2	United States	2	0	2	0	1
