= Archery at the 2010 South American Games – Women's compound 50m =

The Women's compound 50m event at the 2010 South American Games was held on March 21 at 9:00.

== Medalists ==
Gold	Silver	Bronze
Natalia Londoño; Colombia	Luzmary Guedez; Venezuela	Olga Bosh; Venezuela

== Results ==
Rank	Athlete	Series												10s	Xs	Score
Rank	Athlete	1	2	3	4	5	6	7	8	9	10	11	12	10s	Xs	Score
1st place, gold medalist(s)	Natalia Londoño (COL)	29	27	29	29	30	28	29	29	28	29	28	29	23	11	344
2nd place, silver medalist(s)	Luzmary Guedez (VEN)	28	27	28	29	29	29	29	30	29	29	28	28	21	11	343
3rd place, bronze medalist(s)	Olga Bosh (VEN)	27	28	27	28	28	30	29	29	27	29	29	28	15	5	339
4	Talita Araujo (BRA)	27	27	28	27	30	30	29	27	28	26	28	30	15	7	337
5	Betty Flores (VEN)	27	29	27	28	26	28	28	28	29	30	28	27	15	4	335
6	Dirma Miranda dos Santos (BRA)	27	27	27	28	27	28	27	28	28	28	25	28	10	4	328
7	Carolina Montes (VEN)	28	27	28	27	28	27	25	28	28	26	29	26	10	1	327
8	Alejandra Usquiano (COL)	27	28	28	27	29	29	25	28	27	26	26	26	12	5	326
9	Isabel Salazar (COL)	28	28	28	26	25	27	26	27	28	29	26	28	11	5	326
10	Vanina Cecilia Backis (ARG)	26	28	25	26	28	27	27	29	28	26	27	28	12	4	325
11	Nely Acquesta (BRA)	25	27	28	26	26	28	28	27	28	26	29	27	10	4	325
12	Cintia Beatriz Mereles (ARG)	25	27	27	27	28	27	26	27	27	28	28	26	6	3	323
13	Daniela Areias (BRA)	28	28	27	28	29	29	26	27	23	27	24	25	10	5	321
14	Carolina Gadban (COL)	29	25	27	26	25	28	28	26	27	27	26	26	10	6	320
15	Sara Germania Drouet (ECU)	23	28	24	24	29	22	25	23	27	29	28	25	11	3	307
