= Archery at the 2010 South American Games – Women's compound individual =

The women's individual compound event at the 2010 South American Games was held on March 22, beginning at 9:30 and ending at 12:10, with the main final.

== Medalists ==
Gold	Silver	Bronze
Nely Acquesta; Brazil	Luzmary Guedez; Venezuela	Dirma Miranda dos Santos; Brazil

== Results ==
=== Finals ===
Semifinals
1	Luzmary Guedez (VEN)	116
4	Betty Flores (VEN)	111
6	Dirma Miranda dos Santos (BRA)	105
7	Nely Acquesta (BRA)	112

Final
1	Luzmary Guedez (VEN)	114^{10;8}
7	Nely Acquesta (BRA)	114^{10;9}
Third place
4	Betty Flores (VEN)	108
6	Dirma Miranda dos Santos (BRA)	110

=== Top half ===
First Round
9	Isabel Salazar (COL)	109^{8;7}
8	Carolina Montes (VEN)	109^{8;10}
5	Talita Araujo (BRA)	105
12	Daniela Areias (BRA)	106
13	Alejandra Usquiano (COL)	100
4	Betty Flores (VEN)	108

Quarterfinals
1	Luzmary Guedez (VEN)	116
8	Carolina Montes (VEN)	113
12	Daniela Areias (BRA)	106
4	Betty Flores (VEN)	107

Semifinals
1	Luzmary Guedez (VEN)	116
4	Betty Flores (VEN)	111

=== Bottom half ===
First Round
3	Natalia Londoño (COL)	114
14	Vanina Cecilia Backis (ARG)	106
11	Carolina Gadban (COL)	104
6	Dirma Miranda dos Santos (BRA)	111
7	Nely Acquesta (BRA)	109
10	Cintia Beatriz Mereles (ARG)	106
15	Sara Germania Drouet (ECU)	82
2	Olga Bosh (VEN)	111

Quarterfinals
3	Natalia Londoño (COL)	110
6	Dirma Miranda dos Santos (BRA)	112
7	Nely Acquesta (BRA)	110^{9;8;10}
2	Olga Bosh (VEN)	110^{9;8;9}

Semifinals
6	Dirma Miranda dos Santos (BRA)	105
7	Nely Acquesta (BRA)	112
