= Archery at the 2006 Central American and Caribbean Games =

- Location: Cartagena
- Dates: July 15–30

The Archery competition at the 2006 Central American and Caribbean Games was held in Cartagena, Colombia. The tournament was scheduled to be held from 15–30 July 2006.

== Medal summary ==
=== Men's events ===
Event	Gold	Silver	Bronze
Compound 30m	Paris Goico (DOM)	Gabriel Colmenares (VEN)	Jorge Jiménez (ESA)
Compound 50m	Jorge Jiménez (ESA)	Renato Lara (ESA)	Armando de la Garza (MEX)
Compound 70m	Ruben Ochoa (MEX)	Renato Lara (ESA)	Jorge Jiménez (ESA)
Compound 90m	Jorge Jiménez (ESA)	Armando de la Garza (MEX)	Ruben Ochoa (MEX)
Compound FITA 1440	Jorge Jiménez (ESA)	Ruben Ochoa (MEX)	Renato Lara (ESA)
Individual compound	Rigoberto Hernandez (ESA)	Gabriel Oliferow (VEN)	Jorge Jiménez (ESA)
Team compound	Mexico; Ruben Ochoa; Armando de la Garza; Fernando Becerra	El Salvador; Jorge Jiménez; Renato Lara; Rigoberto Hernandez	Venezuela; Gabriel Oliferow; Eduardo Gonzalez; Gary Hernandez
Recurve 30m	Eduardo Magaña (MEX)	David Marin (MEX)	Juan Stevens (CUB)
Recurve 50m	Juan Serrano (MEX)	Juan Stevens (CUB)	David Marin (MEX)
Recurve 70m	Eduardo Magaña (MEX)	Juan Stevens (CUB)	Cristobal Merlos (ESA)
Recurve 90m	Eduardo Magaña (MEX)	Juan Serrano (MEX)	Manuel Diaz (VEN)
Recurve FITA 1440	Eduardo Magaña (MEX)	Juan Serrano (MEX)	Juan Stevens (CUB)
Individual recurve	Ismely Arias (CUB)	Juan Serrano (MEX)	Juan Stevens (CUB)
Team recurve	Cuba; Juan Stevens; Ismely Arias; Ricardo Banos	Mexico; Juan Serrano; Eduardo Magaña; David Marin	Colombia; Juan Echeverría; Sebastian Hernández; José Pachon

=== Women's events ===
Event	Gold	Silver	Bronze
Compound 30m	Linda Ochoa (MEX)	Almendra Ochoa (MEX)	Luzmary Guedez (VEN)
Compound 50m	Linda Ochoa (MEX)	Arminda Bastos (MEX)	Luzmary Guedez (VEN)
Compound 60m	Almendra Ochoa (MEX)	Linda Ochoa (MEX)	Luzmary Guedez (VEN)
Compound 60m	Almendra Ochoa (MEX)	Linda Ochoa (MEX)	Karen Hernandez (ESA)
Compound 70m	Linda Ochoa (MEX)	Almendra Ochoa (MEX)	Yolanda Lagos (ESA)
Compound FITA 1440	Linda Ochoa (MEX)	Almendra Ochoa (MEX)	Luzmary Guedez (VEN)
Individual compound	Linda Ochoa (MEX)	Almendra Ochoa (MEX)	Luzmary Guedez (VEN)
Team compound	Mexico; Linda Ochoa; Almendra Ochoa; Arminda Bastos	El Salvador; Karen Hernandez; Yolanda Lagos; Yeimi Vazquez	Cuba; Odania Camejo; Indira Garcia; Ismary Santos
Recurve 30m	Natalia Sánchez (COL)	Mariangel Colmenares (VEN)	Yaremis Perez (CUB)
Recurve 50m	Natalia Sánchez (COL)	Janeth Garcia (MEX)	Vera Jones (BAR)
Recurve 60m	Lisbeth Leoni (VEN)	Natalia Sánchez (COL)	Arminda Partida (MEX)
Recurve 70m	Natalia Sánchez (COL)	Mariangel Colmenares (VEN)	Leidys Brito (VEN)
Recurve FITA 1440	Natalia Sánchez (COL)	Mariangel Colmenares (VEN)	Leidys Brito (VEN)
Individual recurve	Lisbeth Leoni (VEN)	Natalia Sánchez (COL)	Leidys Brito (VEN)
Team recurve	Mexico; Janeth Garcia; Arminda Partida; Zelma Novelo	Venezuela; Lisbeth Leoni; Leidys Brito; Mariangel Colmenares	Colombia; Deissy Gaona; Ana Rendón; Natalia Sánchez

== Medal table ==
* Host nation (Colombia)

Rank	Nation	Gold	Silver	Bronze	Total
1	Mexico	15	14	4	33
2	El Salvador	4	4	7	15
3	Colombia*	4	2	2	8
4	Venezuela	2	6	10	18
5	Cuba	2	2	5	9
6	Dominican Republic	1	0	0	1
7	Barbados	0	0	1	1
Totals (7 entries)		28	28	29	85
