= Archery at the 2010 South American Games – Men's recurve individual =

The Men's individual recurve event at the 2010 South American Games was held on March 23, beginning at 9:30 and ending at 12:30, with the main final.

== Medalists ==
Gold	Silver	Bronze
Daniel Pacheco; Colombia	Diego Torres; Colombia	Bernardo Oliveira; Brazil

== Results ==
=== Finals ===
Semifinals
1	Bernardo Oliveira (BRA)	93
5	Daniel Pacheco (COL)	107
3	Diego Torres (COL)	100
10	Leonardo Salazar (VEN)	99

Final
5	Daniel Pacheco (COL)	110
3	Diego Torres (COL)	97
Third place
1	Bernardo Oliveira (BRA)	105
10	Leonardo Salazar (VEN)	99

=== Top half ===
First Round
17	Jorge Eduardo Cabrera (ARG)	100
16	Juan Tomasini (URU)	99
21	Emilio Martin Bermudez (ECU)	89
12	Genaro David Riccio (ARG)	95
13	Juan Carlos Dueñas (COL)	106
20	Diego Enrique Marino (ECU)	95

Second Round
1	Bernardo Oliveira (BRA)	107
17	Jorge Eduardo Cabrera (ARG)	93
9	Daniel Pineda (COL)	100
8	Enrique Vilchez (VEN)	102
5	Daniel Pacheco (COL)	101^{9}
12	Genaro David Riccio (ARG)	101^{8}
13	Juan Carlos Dueñas (COL)	101
4	Mario Humberto Gomez (CHI)	96

Quarterfinals
1	Bernardo Oliveira (BRA)	106
8	Enrique Vilchez (VEN)	105
5	Daniel Pacheco (COL)	101
13	Juan Carlos Dueñas (COL)	99

Semifinals
1	Bernardo Oliveira (BRA)	93
5	Daniel Pacheco (COL)	107

=== Bottom half ===
First Round
19	Dario Javier Tipan (ECU)	96
14	Christian Alejandro Arata (CHI)	103
11	Marcos Bortoloto (BRA)	96
22	Alvaro Ignacio Carcamo (CHI)	93
23	Rodrigo Javier Garcete (PAR)	67
10	Leonardo Salazar (VEN)	100
15	Mauro Ricardo de Mattia (ARG)	97
18	Luciano Damian Herenuz (ARG)	101

Second Round
3	Diego Torres (COL)	104
14	Christian Alejandro Arata (CHI)	95
11	Marcos Bortoloto (BRA)	103
6	Fabio Emilio (BRA)	93
7	Elías Malavé (VEN)	102
10	Leonardo Salazar (VEN)	103
18	Luciano Damian Herenuz (ARG)	97
2	Luis Palinyi (BRA)	103

Quarterfinals
3	Diego Torres (COL)	106
6	Fabio Emilio (BRA)	103
10	Leonardo Salazar (VEN)	103
2	Luis Palinyi (BRA)	94

Semifinals
3	Diego Torres (COL)	100
10	Leonardo Salazar (VEN)	99
