= Archery at the 2010 South American Games – Men's recurve over all distances =

The Men's recurve overall event at the 2010 South American Games summed the four distances contested over March 20 and March 21, and served as the qualifying order for the individual event.

== Medalists ==
Gold	Silver	Bronze
Bernardo Oliveira; Brazil	Luis Paulinyi; Brazil	Diego Torres; Colombia

== Results ==
Rank	Athlete	Series				Score
Rank	Athlete	30m	50m	70m	90m	Score
1st place, gold medalist(s)	Bernardo Oliveira (BRA)	351	326	287	287	1251
2nd place, silver medalist(s)	Luis Paulinyi (BRA)	338	321	304	279	1242
3rd place, bronze medalist(s)	Diego Torres (COL)	344	323	304	269	1240
4	Mario Humberto Gomes (CHI)	338	320	300	274	1232
5	Daniel Pacheco (COL)	343	307	295	276	1221
6	Fabio Emilio (BRA)	334	306	307	264	1211
7	Elías Malavé (VEN)	331	301	312	266	1210
8	Enrique Vilchez (VEN)	333	313	284	279	1209
9	Daniel Pineda (COL)	342	318	284	263	1207
10	Leonardo Salazar (VEN)	339	301	295	266	1201
11	Marcos Bortoloto (BRA)	332	298	292	273	1195
12	Genaro David Riccio (ARG)	332	279	289	276	1176
13	Juan Carlos Dueñas (COL)	333	285	293	263	1174
14	Christian Alejandro Arata (CHI)	328	303	284	255	1170
15	Mauro Ricardo de Mattia (ARG)	324	289	305	249	1167
16	Juan Tomasini (URU)	326	300	275	261	1162
17	Jorge Eduardo Cabrera (ARG)	324	280	286	258	1148
18	Luciano Damian Herenuz (ARG)	329	296	279	241	1145
19	Dario Javier Tipan (ECU)	329	300	279	231	1139
20	Diego Enrique Marino (ECU)	315	291	283	239	1128
21	Emilio Martin Bermudez (ECU)	309	281	253	232	1075
22	Alvaro Ignacio Carcamo (CHI)	315	283	262	210	1070
23	Rodrigo Javier Garcete (PAR)	246	214	210	159	829
