= Archery at the 2010 South American Games – Women's compound 60m =

The Women's compound 60m event at the 2010 South American Games was held on March 20 at 11:00.

== Medalists ==
| Gold | Silver | Bronze |
|---|---|---|
| Olga Bosh; Venezuela | Betty Flores; Venezuela | Natalia Londoño; Colombia |

== Results ==
| Rank | Athlete | Series | | | | | | 10s | Xs | Score |
| Rank | Athlete | 1 | 2 | 3 | 4 | 5 | 6 | 10s | Xs | Score |
|---|---|---|---|---|---|---|---|---|---|---|
| 1st place, gold medalist(s) | Olga Bosh (VEN) | 57 | 59 | 59 | 57 | 56 | 58 | 22 | 8 | 346 |
| 2nd place, silver medalist(s) | Betty Flores (VEN) | 59 | 56 | 56 | 57 | 58 | 56 | 19 | 6 | 342 |
| 3rd place, bronze medalist(s) | Natalia Londoño (COL) | 55 | 57 | 57 | 59 | 55 | 59 | 19 | 4 | 342 |
| 4 | Talita Araujo (BRA) | 59 | 57 | 55 | 55 | 59 | 55 | 18 | 8 | 340 |
| 5 | Dirma Miranda dos Santos (BRA) | 55 | 57 | 57 | 56 | 57 | 58 | 18 | 4 | 340 |
| 6 | Luzmary Guedez (VEN) | 58 | 55 | 58 | 55 | 57 | 56 | 18 | 7 | 339 |
| 7 | Nely Acquesta (BRA) | 56 | 55 | 57 | 56 | 57 | 55 | 15 | 8 | 336 |
| 8 | Carolina Gadban (COL) | 54 | 55 | 58 | 55 | 55 | 58 | 15 | 6 | 335 |
| 9 | Carolina Montes (VEN) | 55 | 56 | 57 | 54 | 57 | 55 | 14 | 5 | 334 |
| 10 | Daniela Areias (BRA) | 55 | 54 | 55 | 58 | 55 | 56 | 14 | 7 | 333 |
| 11 | Cintia Beatriz Mereles (ARG) | 55 | 55 | 54 | 56 | 58 | 55 | 12 | 1 | 333 |
| 12 | Isabel Salazar (COL) | 55 | 54 | 56 | 57 | 54 | 56 | 14 | 3 | 332 |
| 13 | Alejandra Usquiano (COL) | 58 | 55 | 53 | 53 | 55 | 56 | 12 | 7 | 330 |
| 14 | Vanina Cecilia Backis (ARG) | 55 | 51 | 56 | 52 | 53 | 57 | 12 | 1 | 324 |
| 15 | Sara Germania Drouet (ECU) | 55 | 54 | 51 | 54 | 49 | 51 | 9 | 5 | 314 |
