= Archery at the 2010 South American Games – Women's compound over all distances =

The Women's compound overall event at the 2010 South American Games summed the four distances contested over March 20 and 21, and served as the qualifying order for the individual event.

== Medalists ==
Gold	Silver	Bronze
Luzmary Guedez; Venezuela	Olga Bosh; Venezuela	Natalia Londoño; Colombia

== Results ==
Rank	Athlete	Series				Score
Rank	Athlete	30m	50m	70m	90m	Score
1st place, gold medalist(s)	Luzmary Guedez (VEN)	357	343	339	333	1372
2nd place, silver medalist(s)	Olga Bosh (VEN)	353	339	346	332	1370
3rd place, bronze medalist(s)	Natalia Londoño (COL)	351	344	342	331	1368
4	Betty Flores (VEN)	353	335	342	325	1355
5	Talita Araujo (BRA)	350	337	340	326	1353
6	Dirma Miranda dos Santos (BRA)	352	328	340	325	1345
7	Nely Acquesta (BRA)	350	325	336	329	1340
8	Carolina Montes (VEN)	348	327	334	324	1333
9	Isabel Salazar (COL)	353	326	332	317	1328
10	Cintia Beatriz Mereles (ARG)	343	323	333	323	1322
11	Carolina Gadban (COL)	354	320	335	307	1316
12	Daniela Areias (BRA)	350	321	333	305	1309
13	Alejandra Usquiano (COL)	325	326	330	324	1305
14	Vanina Cecilia Backis (ARG)	337	325	324	303	1289
15	Sara Germania Drouet (ECU)	343	307	314	315	1279
