= Miranda Leek =

American archer (born 1993)

Personal information
- Full name: Miranda Huerta (Leek)
- Born: May 18, 1993 (age 33) Des Moines, Iowa, U.S.
- Height: 5 ft 4 in (163 cm)
- Weight: 165 lb (75 kg)

Sport
- Sport: Archery
Medal record
Women's archery
Representing United States
Pan American Games
Silver medal – second place	2011 Guadalajara	Individual
Silver medal – second place	2011 Guadalajara	Team

Miranda (Leek) Huerta (born May 18, 1993) is an American archer.

== Career ==
Born in Des Moines, Iowa, Leek learned to shoot from her father, Scott Leek, who is a recreational archer. When she was 5, Scott Leek took her with him to a shooting range and taught her how to use a basic recurve bow. Over time, she began to participate in local competitions, switching to a compound bow, which she would use until switching back to an Olympic-style recurve bow at the age of 12. During this transition, Leek continued to be coached by her father, with additional support and advice from archery coach Terry Wunderle and his son, former Olympian Vic Wunderle. By age 14 she was selected as a member of USA Archery's Junior Dream Team, and began to be coached by Kisik Lee, her current team coach. Her father remains her personal coach.

In 2010, Leek was selected as the sole representative of the United States in women's archery at the 2010 Summer Youth Olympics. The following year, she graduated from Dowling Catholic High School in West Des Moines, and has been accepted to attend Texas A&M University starting in fall, 2012. Also in 2011, Leek participated as a member of the United States women's team at the 2011 Pan American Games in Guadalajara, Mexico. There, she won silver medals in both the individual and team competitions. She qualified to compete in both the individual and team competitions at the 2012 Summer Olympics in London, beating out two more experienced archers for the right to compete in the individual competition on behalf of the United States. She did not medal in either competition.
