= Archery at the 2010 South American Games – Men's compound 30m =

The Men's compound 30m event at the 2010 South American Games was held on March 23 at 11:15.

== Medalists ==
Gold	Silver	Bronze
Roberval dos Santos; Brazil	Guillermo Omar Contreras; Chile	Omar Mejía; Colombia

== Results ==
Rank	Athlete	Series												10s	Xs	Score
Rank	Athlete	1	2	3	4	5	6	7	8	9	10	11	12	10s	Xs	Score
1st place, gold medalist(s)	Roberval dos Santos (BRA)	30	30	30	30	30	30	30	30	30	30	30	30	36	25	360
2nd place, silver medalist(s)	Guillermo Omar Contreras (CHI)	29	30	30	30	30	30	30	30	29	30	30	30	34	22	358
3rd place, bronze medalist(s)	Omar Mejía (COL)	30	30	30	30	30	30	30	30	30	29	29	30	34	17	358
4	Gary Alejandro Hernandez (VEN)	30	30	30	30	30	29	29	30	30	30	30	30	34	15	358
5	Eduardo Jesus Gonzalez (VEN)	30	30	30	29	30	30	30	30	30	30	30	29	34	12	358
6	Gabriel Lee Oliferow (VEN)	30	30	29	30	30	30	30	30	29	30	29	30	33	20	357
7	Gabriel Alejandro Marti (ARG)	30	30	30	29	30	30	30	29	30	29	30	30	33	19	357
8	Claudio Contrucci (BRA)	30	30	30	30	30	29	30	29	30	30	29	30	33	18	357
8	Marcelo Roriz Junior (BRA)	30	30	30	30	29	29	30	30	29	30	30	30	33	18	357
10	Daniel Muñoz (COL)	30	29	29	30	29	30	30	30	30	29	30	30	32	17	356
10	Alberto Sergio Pozzolo (ARG)	29	30	30	30	29	29	30	30	29	30	30	30	32	17	356
12	Guillermo Gimpel (CHI)	30	29	30	30	29	30	29	30	30	29	30	29	31	17	355
13	Juan Pablo Cancino (CHI)	30	29	29	30	30	30	29	30	30	29	29	30	31	15	355
14	Pablo Gustavo Maio (ARG)	29	28	30	30	30	29	30	30	30	30	28	30	30	18	354
15	Nelson Eduardo Torres (VEN)	29	29	29	29	30	30	30	30	28	30	29	30	29	20	353
16	Juan Manuel Arango (COL)	30	30	30	29	28	30	29	28	30	30	30	28	28	12	352
17	Nestor Federico Gaute (ARG)	30	29	30	30	29	29	30	29	30	29	29	26	27	12	350
18	José Ospina (COL)	28	28	30	28	30	30	27	30	30	30	30	28	26	11	349
19	Vilson Tonao (BRA)	27	29	28	29	29	29	30	29	30	29	30	30	25	7	349
20	Jose Joaquin Livesey (CHI)	28	30	28	28	24	30	30	30	28	29	29	28	21	6	342
