= Archery at the 2010 South American Games – Men's recurve team =

The Men's recurve team event at the 2010 South American Games had its qualification during the individual qualification on March 21, and the finals on March 24.

== Medalists ==
Gold	Silver	Bronze
Diego Torres; Juan Carlos Dueñas; Daniel Pacheco; Colombia	Luis Paulinyi; Bernardo Oliveira; Fabio Emilio; Brazil	Leonardo Salazar; Enrique Vilchez; Elías Malavé; Venezuela

== Results ==
=== Qualification ===
Rank	Team	Score
1	Brazil	3704
1	Bernardo Oliveira	1251
1	Luis Paulinyi	1242
1	Fabio Emilio	1211
2	Colombia	3635
2	Diego Torres	1240
2	Daniel Pacheco	1221
2	Juan Carlos Dueñas	1174
3	Venezuela	3620
3	Elías Malavé	1210
3	Enrique Vilchez	1209
3	Leonardo Salazar	1201
4	Chile	3472
4	Mario Humberto Valdés Gomez	1232
4	Christian Alejandro Medina Arata	1170
4	Alvaro Ignacio Lastra Carcamo	1070
5	Argentina	3469
5	Genaro David Riccio	1176
5	Jorge Eduardo Cabrera	1148
5	Luciano Damian Herenuz	1145
6	Ecuador	3342
6	Dario Javier Tipan	1139
6	Diego Enrique Marino	1128
6	Emilio Martin Bermudez	1075

=== Draw ===
Quarterfinals
5	Argentina	209
4	Chile	189
3	Venezuela	208
6	Ecuador	195

Semifinals
1	Brazil	206
5	Argentina	194
3	Venezuela	203
2	Colombia	211

Finals
1	Brazil	192
2	Colombia	210
Third place
4	Argentina	186
3	Venezuela	189

=== Final match details ===
Rank	Team Athletes	End	Arrows			Score
	Colombia	24-Match Total				210
	Diego Torres; Juan Carlos Dueñas; Daniel Pacheco	1	10	10	10	28
	Diego Torres; Juan Carlos Dueñas; Daniel Pacheco	1	10	8	8	26
	Diego Torres; Juan Carlos Dueñas; Daniel Pacheco	2	10	8	9	27
	Diego Torres; Juan Carlos Dueñas; Daniel Pacheco	2	9	8	8	25
	Diego Torres; Juan Carlos Dueñas; Daniel Pacheco	3	7	8	10	25
	Diego Torres; Juan Carlos Dueñas; Daniel Pacheco	3	8	8	9	25
	Diego Torres; Juan Carlos Dueñas; Daniel Pacheco	4	8	10	10	28
	Diego Torres; Juan Carlos Dueñas; Daniel Pacheco	4	7	9	10	26
	Brazil	24-Match Total				192
	Luis Paulinyi; Bernardo Oliveira; Fabio Emilio	1	7	9	9	25
	Luis Paulinyi; Bernardo Oliveira; Fabio Emilio	1	8	9	5	22
	Luis Paulinyi; Bernardo Oliveira; Fabio Emilio	2	7	9	9	25
	Luis Paulinyi; Bernardo Oliveira; Fabio Emilio	2	9	8	9	26
	Luis Paulinyi; Bernardo Oliveira; Fabio Emilio	3	8	8	8	24
	Luis Paulinyi; Bernardo Oliveira; Fabio Emilio	3	8	8	9	25
	Luis Paulinyi; Bernardo Oliveira; Fabio Emilio	4	6	7	7	20
	Luis Paulinyi; Bernardo Oliveira; Fabio Emilio	4	9	10	6	25
