= Archery at the 2010 South American Games – Men's compound 70m =

The Men's compound 70m event at the 2010 South American Games was held on March 20 at 11:00.

== Medalists ==
Gold	Silver	Bronze
Nelson Eduardo Torres; Venezuela	Pablo Maio; Argentina	Gary Alejandro Hernandez; Venezuela

== Results ==
Rank	Athlete	Series						10s	Xs	Score
Rank	Athlete	1	2	3	4	5	6	10s	Xs	Score
1st place, gold medalist(s)	Nelson Eduardo Torres (VEN)	57	56	58	57	58	59	21	6	345
2nd place, silver medalist(s)	Pablo Maio (ARG)	59	57	56	58	56	57	22	6	343
3rd place, bronze medalist(s)	Gary Alejandro Hernandez (VEN)	56	60	55	55	58	56	21	8	340
4	Daniel Muñoz (COL)	58	54	56	58	56	58	17	6	340
5	Omar Mejía (COL)	59	56	58	55	56	55	17	3	339
6	Claudio Contrucci (BRA)	58	57	55	55	55	56	16	4	336
7	Jose Livesey (CHI)	54	57	57	56	55	57	15	5	336
8	Marcelo Roriz Junior (BRA)	55	54	55	57	57	57	16	6	335
9	Gabriel Lee Oliferow (VEN)	58	54	55	54	54	59	16	5	334
10	Guillermo Contreras (CHI)	55	55	57	53	55	59	14	6	334
11	Roberval dos Santos (BRA)	52	56	57	56	53	59	16	6	333
12	Guillermo Gimpel (CHI)	55	53	55	58	55	55	17	11	331
13	Eduardo Jesus Gonzalez (VEN)	56	54	57	54	54	54	11	3	329
14	Alberto Sergio Pozzolo (ARG)	56	55	52	53	54	57	11	5	327
15	Nestor Federico Gaute (ARG)	55	53	56	55	56	52	10	6	327
16	Juan Pablo Cancino (CHI)	56	52	53	57	53	53	11	5	324
17	Vilson Tonao (BRA)	53	55	53	55	55	53	10	0	324
18	Gabriel Marti (ARG)	57	53	53	57	56	47	14	3	323
19	José Ospina (COL)	52	51	57	52	53	53	11	3	318
20	Juan Manuel Arango (COL)	53	50	54	55	49	54	8	3	315
