= Archery at the 2010 South American Games – Men's recurve 70m =

The Men's recurve 90m event at the 2010 South American Games was held on March 20 at 9:00.

== Medalists ==
Gold	Silver	Bronze
Elías Malavé; Venezuela	Fabio Emilio; Brazil	Mauro Ricardo de Mattia; Argentina

== Results ==
Rank	Athlete	Series						10s	Xs	Score
Rank	Athlete	1	2	3	4	5	6	10s	Xs	Score
1st place, gold medalist(s)	Elías Malavé (VEN)	50	53	50	53	55	51	6	2	312
2nd place, silver medalist(s)	Fábio Emilio (BRA)	49	51	52	55	48	52	5	2	307
3rd place, bronze medalist(s)	Mauro Ricardo de Mattia (ARG)	49	54	46	47	51	58	11	3	305
4	Luis Paulinyi (BRA)	51	51	51	53	50	48	7	2	304
5	Diego Torres (COL)	48	52	49	52	52	51	6	2	304
6	Mario Humberto Gomez (CHI)	53	49	44	50	56	48	7	1	300
7	Daniel Pacheco (COL)	52	49	57	50	51	36	7	1	295
8	Leonardo Salazar (VEN)	46	51	45	51	51	51	5	1	295
9	Juan Carlos Dueñas (COL)	48	46	47	48	51	53	3	0	293
10	Marcos Bortoloto (BRA)	45	48	50	48	50	51	3	2	292
11	Genaro Riccio (ARG)	41	51	53	48	49	47	4	0	289
12	Bernardo Oliveira (BRA)	54	48	54	43	38	50	6	1	287
13	Jorge Eduardo Cabrera (ARG)	47	48	44	48	46	53	4	0	286
14	Daniel Pineda (COL)	43	42	46	53	54	46	7	4	284
15	Christian Arata (CHI)	43	52	42	50	45	52	5	4	284
16	Enrique Vilchez (VEN)	44	51	47	50	45	47	4	0	284
17	Diego Enrique Marino (ECU)	46	51	50	49	44	43	4	3	283
18	Luciano Herenuz (ARG)	55	41	45	46	47	45	4	0	279
19	Dario Tipan (ECU)	47	49	46	43	45	49	0	0	279
20	Juan Tomasini (URU)	48	46	46	51	44	40	3	1	275
21	Alvaro Ignacio Carcamo (CHI)	45	41	43	47	41	45	1	0	262
22	Emilio Martin Bermudez (ECU)	44	35	44	45	50	35	2	0	253
23	Rodrigo Javier Garcete (PAR)	28	34	40	40	30	38	0	0	210
