= Archery at the 2010 South American Games – Men's compound 50m =

The Men's compound 50m event at the 2010 South American Games was held on March 23 at 9:00.

== Medalists ==
| Gold | Silver | Bronze |
|---|---|---|
| Claudio Contrucci; Brazil | Roberval dos Santos; Brazil | Gabriel Lee Oliferow; Venezuela |

== Results ==
| Rank | Athlete | Series | | | | | | | | | | | | 10s | Xs | Score |
| Rank | Athlete | 1 | 2 | 3 | 4 | 5 | 6 | 7 | 8 | 9 | 10 | 11 | 12 | 10s | Xs | Score |
|---|---|---|---|---|---|---|---|---|---|---|---|---|---|---|---|---|
| 1st place, gold medalist(s) | Claudio Contrucci (BRA) | 30 | 28 | 28 | 27 | 28 | 28 | 29 | 30 | 29 | 29 | 30 | 29 | 23 | 7 | 345 |
| 2nd place, silver medalist(s) | Roberval dos Santos (BRA) | 28 | 30 | 29 | 29 | 28 | 28 | 28 | 28 | 30 | 29 | 29 | 29 | 21 | 9 | 345 |
| 3rd place, bronze medalist(s) | Gabriel Lee Oliferow (VEN) | 26 | 29 | 29 | 29 | 26 | 28 | 29 | 29 | 29 | 29 | 30 | 30 | 22 | 10 | 343 |
| 4 | Nelson Eduardo Torres (VEN) | 30 | 28 | 28 | 29 | 29 | 29 | 29 | 27 | 29 | 28 | 28 | 28 | 19 | 10 | 342 |
| 5 | Guillermo Omar Contreras (CHI) | 29 | 28 | 30 | 29 | 28 | 29 | 30 | 29 | 28 | 27 | 29 | 25 | 22 | 3 | 341 |
| 6 | Gary Alejandro Hernandez (VEN) | 30 | 26 | 28 | 30 | 28 | 29 | 28 | 28 | 28 | 28 | 29 | 29 | 21 | 6 | 341 |
| 7 | Eduardo Jesus Gonzalez (VEN) | 30 | 29 | 29 | 29 | 27 | 29 | 26 | 28 | 28 | 29 | 28 | 29 | 19 | 4 | 341 |
| 8 | Daniel Muñoz (COL) | 28 | 29 | 28 | 29 | 28 | 28 | 29 | 30 | 27 | 28 | 30 | 26 | 18 | 9 | 340 |
| 9 | Marcelo Roriz Junior (BRA) | 28 | 29 | 28 | 28 | 30 | 29 | 28 | 26 | 29 | 28 | 28 | 28 | 17 | 10 | 339 |
| 10 | Guillermo Gimpel (CHI) | 27 | 29 | 28 | 28 | 29 | 28 | 29 | 28 | 29 | 26 | 27 | 28 | 18 | 7 | 336 |
| 11 | Omar Mejía (COL) | 26 | 29 | 29 | 28 | 27 | 29 | 28 | 29 | 26 | 29 | 29 | 27 | 18 | 4 | 336 |
| 12 | Juan Pablo Cancino (CHI) | 27 | 29 | 30 | 27 | 29 | 27 | 28 | 29 | 26 | 28 | 29 | 26 | 18 | 5 | 335 |
| 13 | Alberto Sergio Pozzolo (ARG) | 28 | 28 | 27 | 28 | 27 | 29 | 27 | 28 | 29 | 29 | 28 | 27 | 17 | 8 | 335 |
| 14 | Gabriel Alejandro Marti (ARG) | 27 | 28 | 29 | 27 | 28 | 29 | 26 | 30 | 28 | 30 | 25 | 26 | 18 | 3 | 333 |
| 15 | Nestor Federico Gaute (ARG) | 26 | 30 | 28 | 25 | 25 | 30 | 28 | 27 | 29 | 29 | 28 | 26 | 16 | 4 | 331 |
| 16 | Juan Manuel Arango (COL) | 29 | 27 | 29 | 28 | 27 | 27 | 26 | 27 | 27 | 28 | 28 | 27 | 15 | 4 | 330 |
| 17 | Vilson Tonao (BRA) | 25 | 26 | 29 | 30 | 30 | 27 | 28 | 25 | 29 | 23 | 29 | 27 | 16 | 8 | 328 |
| 18 | Pablo Gustavo Maio (ARG) | 29 | 28 | 26 | 24 | 27 | 29 | 28 | 27 | 29 | 28 | 25 | 28 | 10 | 1 | 328 |
| 19 | Jose Joaquin Livesey (CHI) | 28 | 28 | 26 | 28 | 27 | 28 | 26 | 28 | 27 | 27 | 27 | 26 | 10 | 2 | 326 |
| 20 | José Ospina (COL) | 28 | 26 | 26 | 25 | 27 | 27 | 28 | 27 | 28 | 28 | 26 | 28 | 11 | 2 | 324 |
