= Bernardo Oliveira =

Bernardo Oliveira may refer to:

- Bernardo Oliveira (archer)
- Bernardo Oliveira (soccer)
