= Archery at the 2010 South American Games – Men's compound team =

International sporting competition

The men's compound team event at the 2010 South American Games had its qualification during the individual qualification on March 21, and the finals on March 24.

== Medalists ==
Gold	Silver	Bronze
Gabriel Lee Oliferow; Eduardo Jesus Gonzalez; Gary Alejandro Hernandez; Venezuela	Claudio Contrucci; Marcelo Roriz Junior; Roberval dos Santos; Brazil	Guillermo Omar Contreras; Jose Joaquin Livesey; Juan Pablo Cancino; Chile

== Results ==
=== Qualification ===
Rank	Team	Score
1	Brazil	4084
1	Roberval dos Santos	1368
1	Claudio Contrucci	1359
1	Marcelo Roriz Junior	1357
2	Venezuela	4054
2	Gary Alejandro Hernandez	1359
2	Gabriel Lee Oliferow	1354
2	Eduardo Jesus Gonzalez	1359
3	Chile	4013
3	Guillermo Omar Contreras	1352
3	Juan Pablo Cancino	1335
3	Jose Joaquin Livesey	1326
4	Argentina	4012
4	Pablo Gustavo Maio	1345
4	Nestor Gaute	1339
4	Alberto Pozzolo	1328
5	Colombia	3979
5	Daniel Muñoz	1360
5	Omar Mejía	1353
5	José Ospina	1266

=== Draw ===
Quarterfinals
5	Colombia	227
4	Argentina	224

Semifinals
1	Brazil	224
5	Colombia	223
3	Chile	216
2	Venezuela	231

Finals
1	Brazil	216
2	Venezuela	222
Third place
5	Colombia	213
3	Chile	221

=== Final Match Details ===
Rank	Team Athletes	End	Arrows			Score
	Venezuela	24-Match Total				222
	Gabriel Lee Oliferow; Eduardo Jesus Gonzalez; Gary Alejandro Hernandez	1	9	10	9	28
	Gabriel Lee Oliferow; Eduardo Jesus Gonzalez; Gary Alejandro Hernandez	1	9	9	9	27
	Gabriel Lee Oliferow; Eduardo Jesus Gonzalez; Gary Alejandro Hernandez	2	9	9	9	27
	Gabriel Lee Oliferow; Eduardo Jesus Gonzalez; Gary Alejandro Hernandez	2	9	9	10	28
	Gabriel Lee Oliferow; Eduardo Jesus Gonzalez; Gary Alejandro Hernandez	3	10	8	9	27
	Gabriel Lee Oliferow; Eduardo Jesus Gonzalez; Gary Alejandro Hernandez	3	9	9	9	27
	Gabriel Lee Oliferow; Eduardo Jesus Gonzalez; Gary Alejandro Hernandez	4	10	9	9	28
	Gabriel Lee Oliferow; Eduardo Jesus Gonzalez; Gary Alejandro Hernandez	4	10	10	10	30
	Brazil	24-Match Total				192
	Claudio Contrucci; Marcelo Roriz Junior; Roberval dos Santos	1	8	10	8	26
	Claudio Contrucci; Marcelo Roriz Junior; Roberval dos Santos	1	7	10	9	26
	Claudio Contrucci; Marcelo Roriz Junior; Roberval dos Santos	2	9	9	9	27
	Claudio Contrucci; Marcelo Roriz Junior; Roberval dos Santos	2	10	10	9	29
	Claudio Contrucci; Marcelo Roriz Junior; Roberval dos Santos	3	10	10	10	30
	Claudio Contrucci; Marcelo Roriz Junior; Roberval dos Santos	3	10	9	2	21
	Claudio Contrucci; Marcelo Roriz Junior; Roberval dos Santos	4	10	10	9	29
	Claudio Contrucci; Marcelo Roriz Junior; Roberval dos Santos	4	10	9	9	28
