= Archery at the 2010 South American Games – Men's compound 90m =

The Men's compound 90m event at the 2010 South American Games was held on March 20 at 9:00.

== Medalists ==
Gold	Silver	Bronze
Nestor Federico Gaute; Argentina	Roberval dos Santos; Brazil	Marcelo Roriz Junior; Brazil

== Results ==
Rank	Athlete	Series						10s	Xs	Score
Rank	Athlete	1	2	3	4	5	6	10s	Xs	Score
1st place, gold medalist(s)	Nestor Federico Gaute (ARG)	54	51	58	57	55	56	15	6	331
2nd place, silver medalist(s)	Roberval dos Santos (BRA)	55	55	52	58	54	56	13	1	330
3rd place, bronze medalist(s)	Marcelo Roriz Junior (BRA)	54	54	56	55	52	55	11	5	326
4	Daniel Muñoz (COL)	52	56	53	52	54	57	15	3	324
5	Nelson Eduardo Torres (VEN)	55	52	54	54	54	54	10	6	323
6	Jose Livesey (CHI)	52	55	53	56	53	53	10	3	322
7	Claudio Contrucci (BRA)	51	56	53	52	54	55	11	6	321
8	Juan Pablo Cancino (CHI)	52	54	55	55	53	52	11	3	321
9	Omar Mejía (COL)	57	51	57	52	51	52	10	3	320
10	Pablo Maio (ARG)	56	53	53	55	54	49	10	2	320
11	Gabriel Lee Oliferow (VEN)	55	52	52	51	54	56	9	1	320
12	Gary Alejandro Hernandez (VEN)	54	55	54	52	52	53	8	6	320
13	Guillermo Contreras (CHI)	50	52	53	55	53	56	10	1	319
14	Gabriel Marti (ARG)	51	51	50	53	55	56	6	1	316
15	Eduardo Jesus Gonzalez (VEN)	50	53	51	53	53	53	6	3	313
16	Alberto Sergio Pozzolo (ARG)	47	56	46	52	55	54	9	6	310
17	Vilson Tonao (BRA)	54	48	51	52	54	47	7	0	306
18	Juan Manuel Arango (COL)	51	51	47	53	53	49	5	2	304
19	Guillermo Gimpel (CHI)	44	52	46	50	51	55	6	1	298
20	José Ospina (COL)	51	44	49	52	40	39	6	2	275
