= Archery at the 2010 South American Games – Men's compound individual =

The Men's individual compound event at the 2010 South American Games was held on March 22, beginning at 9:30 and ending at 12:30, with the main final.

== Medalists ==
Gold	Silver	Bronze
Nelson Eduardo torres Venezuela	Claudio Contrucci; Brazil	Marcelo Roriz Junior; Brazil

== Results ==
=== Finals ===
Semifinals
1	Roberval dos Santos (BRA)	115
5	Claudio Contrucci (BRA)	117
6	Marcelo Roriz Junior (BRA)	115
2	Nelson Eduardo Torres (VEN)	117

Final
5	Claudio Contrucci (BRA)	110
2	Nelson Eduardo Torres (VEN)	114
Third place
1	Roberval dos Santos (BRA)	115
6	Marcelo Roriz Junior (BRA)	117

=== Top half ===
First Round
17	Guillermo Gimpel (CHI)	109
16	Jose Joaquin Livesey (CHI)	110

Second Round
1	Roberval dos Santos (BRA)	117
17	Jose Joaquin Livesey (CHI)	111
9	Guillermo Omar Contreras (CHI)	114
8	Omar Mejía (COL)	113
5	Claudio Contrucci (BRA)	118
12	Nestor Gaute (ARG)	108
13	Juan Pablo Cancino (CHI)	114^{10;9}
4	Gary Alejandro Hernandez (VEN)	114^{10;10}

Quarterfinals
1	Roberval dos Santos (BRA)	115
9	Guillermo Omar Contreras (CHI)	111
5	Claudio Contrucci (BRA)	116^{X}
4	Gary Alejandro Hernandez (VEN)	116^{9}

Semifinals
1	Roberval dos Santos (BRA)	115
5	Claudio Contrucci (BRA)	117

=== Bottom half ===
First Round
19	Juan Manuel Arango (COL)	108
14	Gabriel Alejandro Marti (ARG)	112
15	Alberto Sergio Pazzolo (ARG)	108
18	Vilson Tonao (BRA)	110

Second Round
3	Daniel Muñoz (COL)	112
14	Gabriel Alejandro Marti (ARG)	111
11	Eduardo Jesus Gonzalez (VEN)	115
6	Marcelo Roriz Junior (BRA)	118
7	Gabriel Lee Oliferow (VEN)	114
10	Pablo Gustavo Maio (ARG)	111
18	Vilson Tonao (BRA)	110
2	Nelson Eduardo Torres (VEN)	114

Quarterfinals
3	Daniel Muñoz (COL)	113
6	Marcelo Roriz Junior (BRA)	116
7	Gabriel Lee Oliferow (VEN)	114
2	Nelson Eduardo Torres (VEN)	115

Semifinals
6	Marcelo Roriz Junior (BRA)	115
2	Nelson Eduardo Torres (VEN)	117
