= Archery at the 2026 South American Games =

Archery competitions at the 2026 South American Games

- Venue: Hipodromo Ovalo
- Dates: September 22–25

Archery competitions at the 2026 South American Games in Rosario, Santa Fe, and Rafaela, Argentina, were held between September 22 and 25 at Hipodromo Ovalo, located within Parque de la Independencia in Rosario.

A total of 10 events was contested (four men, four women and two mixed). The games gave four quotas for the individual events from the 2027 Pan American Games archery competitions.

== Medal summary ==
=== Medal table ===
* Host nation (Argentina)

Rank	Nation	Gold	Silver	Bronze	Total
1	Colombia	7	4	2	13
2	Brazil	3	3	1	7
3	Argentina*	0	3	3	6
4	Chile	0	0	2	2
5	Ecuador	0	0	1	1
5	Venezuela	0	0	1	1
Totals (6 entries)		10	10	10	30

=== Medalists ===
==== Men ====
Event	Gold	Silver	Bronze
Individual recurve	Jorge Enríquez; Colombia	Marcus D'Almeida; Brazil	Matheus Ely; Brazil
Individual compound	Pablo Gómez; Colombia	Sebastián Arenas; Colombia	Jagdeep Singh; Colombia
Team recurve	Brazil; Marcus D'Almeida; Matheus Ely; Matheus Gomes	Colombia; Jorge Enríquez; Santiago Arcila; Santiago Cruz	Chile; Andrés Gallardo; Tomás Peña; Ángel Vega
Team compound	Colombia; Sebastián Arenas; Pablo Gómez; Jagdeep Singh	Argentina; Nelson Salinas; Ivan Nikolajuk; Lucas Garces	Venezuela; Eduardo González; Diego Camacho; Fraiber Rodríguez

==== Women ====
Event	Gold	Silver	Bronze
Individual recurve	Ana Rendón; Colombia	Ane Marcelle dos Santos; Brazil	Alma Pueyo; Argentina
Individual compound	Sara López; Colombia	Alejandra Usquiano; Colombia	Mariana Rodríguez; Colombia
Team recurve	Brazil; Ana Luiza Caetano; Ane Marcelle dos Santos; Isabelle Estevez	Colombia; Ana Rendón; Isabella Forero; Tania Arias	Argentina; Alma Pueyo; María Giudice; Wanda Arca
Team compound	Colombia; Alejandra Usquiano; Mariana Rodríguez; Sara López	Argentina; María González; Daniela Cheffer; Guillermina González	Ecuador; Mia Navarrete; Blanca Rodrigo; Stephania González

==== Mixed ====
Event	Gold	Silver	Bronze
Team recurve	Brazil; Marcus D'Almeida; Ana Luiza Caetano	Argentina; Estebán Silva; Alma Pueyo	Chile; Andrés Gallardo; Gabriela Anabalón
Team compound	Colombia; Pablo Gómez; Sara López	Brazil; Jairo da Silva; Bianca Rodrigues	Argentina; Ivan Nikolajuk; María González

== Results ==
=== Men's individual recurve ===
Ranking Round

Rank	Name	Nation	Score
1	Marcus D'Almeida	Brazil	671
2	Jorge Enríquez	Colombia	667
3	Andrés Gallardo	Chile	657
4	Matheus Ely	Brazil	654
5	Matheus Gomes	Brazil	653
6	Santiago Arcila	Colombia	646
7	Luis Vivas	Venezuela	645
8	Esteban Silva	Argentina	642
9	Santiago Cruz	Colombia	638
10	Juan Peralta	Ecuador	636
11	Ángel Vega	Chile	635
12	Damián Jajarabilla	Argentina	634
13	Tomás Peña	Chile	632
14	Ricardo Vasquez	Venezuela	627
15	Nanuq Herzog	Bolivia	617
16	Gustavo Romero	Peru	612
17	Pablo Toral	Ecuador	609
18	Léster Ortegón	Ecuador	607
19	Heber Pacheco	Venezuela	607
20	Matías Noriega	Argentina	603
21	Liborio Saavedra	Panama	591
22	Ian Ibañez	Peru	583
23	Samuel Chacón	Bolivia	550
24	Jorge Gómez	Paraguay	541
25	Diego Fernández	Peru	537
26	Diego Britos	Uruguay	528
27	Alex Duarte	Paraguay	518
28	Mehandra Chatargum	Guyana	505
29	Trevaughn Waldron	Guyana	505
30	Matías Caballero	Paraguay	483
31	Devin Permaul	Guyana	435

Play-off

1/16 Elimination Round
P Toral (ECU)	4
G Romero (PAR)	6
S Cruz (COL)	6
J Gómez (PAR)	0
D Fernández (PER)	4
E Silva (ARG)	6
M Gomes (BRA)	6
M Chatargum (GUY)	0
L Saavedra (PAN)	4
D Jajarabilla (ARG)	6
T Peña (CHI)	6
M Noriega (ARG)	0
T Waldron (GUY)	0
M Ely (BRA)	6
A Gallardo (CHI)	6
M Caballero (PAR)	0
H Pacheco (VEN)	4
R Vasquez (VEN)	6
Á Vega (CHI)	5
I Ibañez (PER)	0
A Duarte (PAR)	0
S Arcila (COL)	6
L Vivas (VEN)	7
D Britos (URU)	1
S Chacón (BOL)	2
J Peralta (ECU)	6
N Herzog (BOL)	2
L Ortegón (ECU)	6
D Permaul (GUY)	0
J Enríquez (COL)	6

1/8 Elimination Round
M D'Almeida (BRA)	7
G Romero (PAR)	1
S Cruz (COL)	5
E Silva (ARG)	6
M Gomes (BRA)	6
D Jajarabilla (ARG)	4
T Peña (CHI)	5
M Ely (BRA)	6
A Gallardo (CHI)	6
R Vasquez (VEN)	3
Á Vega (CHI)	6
S Arcila (COL)	4
L Vivas (VEN)	4
J Peralta (ECU)	6
L Ortegón (ECU)	0
J Enríquez (COL)	6

Quarterfinals
M D'Almeida (BRA)	6
E Silva (ARG)	0
M Gomes (BRA)	2
M Ely (BRA)	6
A Gallardo (CHI)	0
Á Vega (CHI)	6
J Peralta (ECU)	3
J Enríquez (COL)	7

Semifinals
M D'Almeida (BRA)	6
M Ely (BRA)	4
Á Vega (CHI)	1
J Enríquez (COL)	7

Final
M D'Almeida (BRA)	5
J Enríquez (COL)	6
Third place
M Ely (BRA)	6
Á Vega (CHI)	2

=== Men's individual compound ===
Ranking Round

Rank	Name	Nation	Score
1	Pablo Gómez	Colombia	705 GR
2	Jagdeep Singh	Colombia	695
3	Fraiber Rodríguez	Venezuela	690
4	Alejandro Martín	Chile	690
5	Jairo Da Silva	Brazil	689
6	Sebastián Arenas	Colombia	688
7	Ivan Nikolajuk	Argentina	685
8	Ángel Bueno	Peru	683
9	William Moraes	Brazil	682
10	Nelson Salinas	Argentina	677
11	Rogerio Ambrosio	Brazil	677
12	Eduardo González	Venezuela	675
13	Luís Araújo	Bolivia	674
14	Santiago Prado	Peru	673
15	Lucas Garces	Argentina	671
16	Mateo Oleas	Ecuador	669
17	Alberto Palaco	Peru	669
18	Agustín Infante	Ecuador	653
19	Enzo Herrera	Paraguay	651
20	Nicolás Neuschul	Uruguay	647
21	Diego Camacho	Venezuela	645
22	Wildo Sánchez	Paraguay	644
23	Joel Gonzales	Bolivia	629
24	Christian Báez	Paraguay	624
	Juan Vargas	Chile	DNS

Play-off

1/16 Elimination Round
A Palaco (PER)	141
M Oleas (ECU)	146
W Moraes (BRA)	142^{9}
C Báez (PAR)	142^{10}
D Camacho (VEN)	141
E González (VEN)	145
L Araújo (BOL)	142
N Neuschul (URU)	135
E Herrera (PAR)	141
S Prado (PER)	142
R Ambrosio (BRA)	147
W Sánchez (PAR)	136
J Gonzales (BOL)	134
N Salinas (ARG)	142
L Garces (ARG)	143
A Infante (ECU)	137

1/8 Elimination Round
P Gómez (COL)	147
M Oleas (ECU)	136
C Báez (PAR)	136
Á Bueno (PER)	139
J Da Silva (BRA)	146
E González (VEN)	143
L Araújo (BOL)	141
A Martín (CHI)	142
F Rodríguez (VEN)	142
S Prado (PER)	132
R Ambrosio (BRA)	137
S Arenas (COL)	146
I Nikolajuk (ARG)	139
N Salinas (ARG)	136
L Garces (ARG)	141
J Singh (COL)	144

Quarterfinals
P Gómez (COL)	149
Á Bueno (PER)	141
J Da Silva (BRA)	147
A Martín (CHI)	146
F Rodríguez (VEN)	144
S Arenas (COL)	145
I Nikolajuk (ARG)	143
J Singh (COL)	147

Semifinals
P Gómez (COL)	147
J Da Silva (BRA)	141
S Arenas (COL)	149
J Singh (COL)	143

Final
P Gómez (COL)	147
S Arenas (COL)	145
Third place
J Da Silva (BRA)	144
J Singh (COL)	145

=== Men's team recurve ===
Ranking Round

Rank	Nation	Name	Individual	Total
1	Brazil	Marcus D'Almeida; Matheus Ely; Matheus Gomes	671; 654; 653	1978
2	Colombia	Santiago Arcila; Santiago Cruz; Jorge Enríquez	646; 638; 667	1951
3	Chile	Andrés Gallardo; Tomás Peña; Ángel Vega	657; 632; 635	1924
4	Venezuela	Heber Pacheco; Ricardo Vasquez; Luis Vivas	607; 627; 645	1879
5	Argentina	Damián Jajarabilla; Matías Noriega; Esteban Silva	634; 603; 642	1879
6	Ecuador	Léster Ortegón; Juan Peralta; Pablo Toral	607; 636; 609	1852
7	Peru	Diego Fernández; Ian Ibañez; Gustavo Romero	537; 583; 612	1732
8	Paraguay	Matías Caballero; Alex Duarte; Jorge Gómez	483; 518; 541	1542
9	Guyana	Mehandra Chatargum; Devin Permaul; Trevaughn Waldron	505; 435; 505	1445

Play-off

1/8 Elimination Round
Guyana	5
Paraguay	3

Quarterfinals
Brazil	6
Guyana	0
Argentina	0
Venezuela	6
Chile	6
Ecuador	0
Peru	0
Colombia	6

Semifinals
Brazil	5
Venezuela	1
Chile	1
Colombia	5

Final
Brazil	6
Colombia	0
Third place
Venezuela	3
Chile	5

=== Men's team compound ===
Ranking Round

Rank	Nation	Name	Individual	Total
1	Colombia	Sebastián Arenas; Pablo Gómez; Jagdeep Singh	688; 705; 695	2088
2	Brazil	Rogerio Ambrosio; Jairo Da Silva; William Moraes	677; 689; 682	2048
3	Argentina	Nelson Salinas; Ivan Nikolajuk; Lucas Garces	671; 685; 677	2033
4	Peru	Ángel Bueno; Alberto Palaco; Santiago Prado	683; 669; 673	2025
5	Venezuela	Eduardo González; Diego Camacho; Fraiber Rodríguez	645; 675; 690	2010
6	Paraguay	Christian Báez; Enzo Herrera; Wildo Sánchez	624; 651; 644	1919
	Chile	Agustín Infante; Alejandro Martín; Juan Vargas		DNS

Play-off

Quarterfinals
Venezuela	217
Peru	210
Argentina	227
Paraguay	210

Semifinals
Colombia	230
Venezuela	223
Argentina	228
Brazil	224

Final
Colombia	231
Argentina	228
Third place
Venezuela	224
Brazil	221

=== Women's individual recurve ===
Ranking Round

Rank	Name	Nation	Score
1	Ana Luiza Caetano	Brazil	639
2	Ana Rendón	Colombia	639
3	Alma Pueyo	Argentina	638
4	Isabelle Estevez	Brazil	625
5	Isabella Forero	Colombia	615
6	Tania Arias	Colombia	601
7	Nieves Arango	Venezuela	598
8	Ane Marcelle dos Santos	Brazil	591
9	Gianella Hermoza	Peru	580
10	Gisela Cowan	Panama	575
11	Gabriela Anabalón	Chile	566
12	Penélope Bustamante	Peru	546
13	Alexandra Zavala	Peru	544
14	Jenny García	Ecuador	524
15	Wanda Arca	Argentina	522
16	Adriana Espinosa	Ecuador	519
17	Emma Duran	Panama	515
18	María Giudice	Argentina	478
19	Nilyem Rodríguez	Bolivia	476
20	Érika González	Ecuador	467
21	Marlene Salcedo	Paraguay	461
22	Geraldine Gutiérrez	Bolivia	459
23	Miriam González	Panama	426
24	Eva Nakatani	Paraguay	420
	Lourdes Villalba	Paraguay	DNF

Play-off

1/16 Elimination Round
E Duran (PAN)	1
A Espinosa (ECU)	7
G Hermoza (PER)	6
E Nakatani (PAR)	0
L Villalba (PAR)	0
A dos Santos (BRA)	6
M Salcedo (PAR)	4
P Bustamante (PER)	6
A Zavala (PER)	6
É González (ECU)	5
N Rodríguez (BOL)	6
J García (ECU)	0
G Anabalón (CHI)	6
G Gutiérrez (BOL)	0
M González (PAN)	2
G Cowan (PAN)	6
W Arca (ARG)	2
M Giudice (ARG)	6

1/8 Elimination Round
A Caetano (BRA)	4
A Espinosa (ECU)	6
G Hermoza (PER)	4
A dos Santos (BRA)	6
I Forero (COL)	2
P Bustamante (PER)	6
A Zavala (PER)	3
I Estevez (BRA)	7
A Pueyo (ARG)	7
N Rodríguez (BOL)	1
G Anabalón (CHI)	4
T Arias (COL)	6
N Arango (VEN)	6
G Cowan (PAN)	4
M Giudice (ARG)	0
A Rendón (COL)	6

Quarterfinals
A Espinosa (ECU)	2
A dos Santos (BRA)	6
P Bustamante (PER)	2
I Estevez (BRA)	6
A Pueyo (ARG)	7
T Arias (COL)	3
N Arango (VEN)	0
A Rendón (COL)	6

Semifinals
A dos Santos (BRA)	6
I Estevez (BRA)	2
A Pueyo (ARG)	0
A Rendón (COL)	6

Final
A dos Santos (BRA)	0
A Rendón (COL)	6
Third place
I Estevez (BRA)	0
A Pueyo (ARG)	6

=== Women's individual compound ===
Ranking Round

Rank	Name	Nation	Score
1	Sara López	Colombia	701
2	Alejandra Usquiano	Colombia	696
3	Mariana Rodríguez	Colombia	687
4	Beatriz Aliaga	Peru	671
5	María González	Argentina	668
6	Bianca Rodrigues	Brazil	667
7	Marianna Chaves	Brazil	663
8	Mia Navarrete	Ecuador	658
9	Blanca Rodrigo	Ecuador	657
10	Aurora Olea	Chile	651
11	Guillermina González	Argentina	644
12	Ana Mendoza	Venezuela	639
13	Larissa Ferrari	Brazil	633
14	Lizbeth Chinahuanca	Bolivia	631
15	Daniela Cheffer	Argentina	624
16	Stephania González	Ecuador	607
17	Bianca Torres	Paraguay	607
18	Nathaly Hermoza	Peru	605
19	Jackeline Palomino	Peru	578

Play-off

1/16 Elimination Round
B Torres (PAR)	134
S González (ECU)	135
J Palomino (PER)	126
L Chinahuanca (BOL)	131
D Cheffer (ARG)	141
N Hermoza (PER)	124

1/8 Elimination Round
S López (COL)	144
S González (ECU)	129
B Rodrigo (ECU)	142
M Navarrete (ECU)	139
M González (ARG)	142
A Mendoza (VEN)	143
L Ferrari (BRA)	131
B Aliaga (PER)	141
M Rodríguez (COL)	146
L Chinahuanca (BOL)	139
G González (ARG)	133
B Rodrigues (BRA)	140
M Chaves (BRA)	134
A Olea (CHI)	135
D Cheffer (ARG)	127
A Usquiano (COL)	143

Quarterfinals
S López (COL)	142
B Rodrigo (ECU)	139
A Mendoza (VEN)}	145
B Aliaga (PER)	134
M Rodríguez (COL)	144
B Rodrigues (BRA)	135
A Olea (CHI)	133
A Usquiano (COL)	140

Semifinals
S López (COL)	144
A Mendoza (VEN)	138
M Rodríguez (COL)	142
A Usquiano (COL)	147

Final
S López (COL)	146
A Usquiano (COL)	143
Third place
A Mendoza (VEN)	142
M Rodríguez (COL)	145

=== Women's team recurve ===
Ranking Round

Rank	Nation	Name	Individual	Total
1	Brazil	Ana Luiza Caetano; Ane Marcelle dos Santos; Isabelle Estevez	639; 591; 625	1855
2	Colombia	Ana Rendón; Isabella Forero; Tania Arias	601; 615; 639	1855
3	Peru	Penélope Bustamante; Gianella Hermoza; Alexandra Zavala	546; 580; 544	1670
4	Argentina	Wanda Arca; María Giudice; Alma Pueyo	522; 478; 638	1638
5	Panama	Gisela Cowan; Emma Duran; Miriam González	575; 515; 426	1516
6	Ecuador	Adriana Espinosa; Jenny García; Érika González	519; 524; 467	1510
7	Paraguay	Eva Nakatani; Marlene Salcedo; Lourdes Villalba	420; 461; 43	924

Play-off

Quarterfinals
Panama	0
Argentina	6
Peru	6
Ecuador	0
Paraguay	0
Colombia	6

Semifinals
Brazil	6
Argentina	2
Peru	0
Colombia	6

Final
Brazil	5
Colombia	1
Third place
Argentina	6
Peru	2

=== Women's team compound ===
Ranking Round

Rank	Nation	Name	Individual	Total
1	Colombia	Sara López; Mariana Rodríguez; Alejandra Usquiano	701; 687; 696	2084; GR
2	Brazil	Marianna Chaves; Larissa Ferrari; Bianca Rodrigues	663; 633; 667	1963
3	Argentina	Daniela Cheffer; Guillermina González; María González	624; 644; 668	1936
4	Ecuador	Stephania González; Mia Navarrete; Blanca Rodrigo	607; 658; 657	1922
5	Peru	Beatriz Aliaga; Nathaly Hermoza; Jackeline Palomino	671; 605; 578	1854

Play-off

Quarterfinals
Peru	198
Ecuador	212

Semifinals
Colombia	229
Ecuador	222
Argentina	220
Brazil	217

Final
Colombia	232
Argentina	215
Third place
Ecuador	213
Brazil	200

=== Mixed team recurve ===
Ranking Round

Rank	Nation	Name	Individual	Total
1	Brazil	Ana Luiza Caetano; Marcus D'Almeida	639; 671	1310
2	Colombia	Ana Rendón; Jorge Enríquez	639; 667	1306
3	Argentina	Alma Pueyo; Esteban Silva	638; 642	1280
4	Venezuela	Nieves Arango; Luis Vivas	598; 645	1243
5	Chile	Gabriela Anabalón; Andrés Gallardo	566; 657	1223
6	Peru	Gianella Hermoza; Gustavo Romero	580; 612	1192
7	Panama	Gisela Cowan; Liborio Saavedra	575; 591	1166
8	Ecuador	Jenny García; Juan Peralta	524; 636	1160
9	Bolivia	Nilyem Rodríguez; Nanuq Herzog	476; 617	1093
10	Paraguay	Marlene Salcedo; Jorge Gómez	461; 541	1002

Play-off

1/8 Elimination Round
Bolivia	2
Ecuador	6
Panama	6
Paraguay	0

Quarterfinals
Brazil	6
Ecuador	0
Chile	5
Venezuela	4
Argentina	5
Peru	1
Panama	5
Colombia	1

Semifinals
Brazil	5
Chile	3
Argentina	5
Panama	1

Final
Brazil	6
Argentina	0
Third place
Chile	6
Panama	2

=== Mixed team compound ===
Ranking Round

Rank	Nation	Name	Individual	Total
1	Colombia	Sara López; Pablo Gómez	701; 705	1406
2	Brazil	Bianca Rodrigues; Jairo Da Silva	667; 689	1356
3	Peru	Beatriz Aliaga; Ángel Bueno	671; 683	1354
4	Argentina	María González; Ivan Nikolajuk	668; 685	1353
5	Chile	Aurora Olea; Alejandro Martín	651; 690	1341
6	Venezuela	Ana Mendoza; Fraiber Rodríguez	639; 690	1329
7	Ecuador	Mia Navarrete; Mateo Oleas	658; 669	1327
8	Bolivia	Lizbeth Chinahuanca; Luís Araújo	631; 674	1305
9	Paraguay	Bianca Torres; Enzo Herrera	607; 651	1258

Play-off

1/8 Elimination Round
Paraguay	140
Bolivia	136

Quarterfinals
Colombia	158
Paraguay	141
Chile	152
Argentina	155
Peru	149
Venezuela	152
Ecuador	152
Brazil	155

Semifinals
Colombia	156
Argentina	154
Venezuela	152
Brazil	154

Final
Colombia	153
Brazil	151
Third place
Argentina	153^{19}
Venezuela	153^{18}
