= Saul N. Ramirez Jr. =

American politician (born 1958)

Saul Ramirez

4th United States Deputy Secretary of Housing and Urban Development
- In office 1998–2001
- President: Bill Clinton
- Secretary: Andrew Cuomo
- Preceded by: Terrence R. Duvernay
- Succeeded by: Alphonso Jackson

Assistant Secretary of Housing and Urban Development for Community Planning and Development
- In office 1997–1998
- President: Bill Clinton
- Preceded by: Andrew Cuomo

Mayor of Laredo
- In office 1990–1997
- Preceded by: Aldo Tatangelo
- Succeeded by: Betty Flores

Personal details
- Born: Saul N. Ramirez Jr. October 22, 1958 (age 68) Los Angeles, California, U.S.
- Party: Democratic
- Education: Texas State University

Saul N. Ramirez Jr. (born October 22, 1958) is an American politician, businessman, and former official in the United States Department of Housing and Urban Development.

== Early life and education ==
Ramirez was born in Los Angeles, California to Saul Ramirez, Sr., and the former Bertha Villarreal. He moved to Laredo when he was three years of age. His father had been a line foreman and diesel engine mechanic at Douglas Aircraft. Ramirez was raised in Laredo, Texas, where he attended the Roman Catholic St. Augustine elementary and high schools.

== Career ==
=== Mayor of Laredo ===
In 1990, Ramirez became the youngest mayor of Laredo, Texas. He earlier served for two four-year terms on the Laredo City Council, prior to becoming mayor. Previously, he worked for nearly two decades in the insurance industry in Laredo. He is a former board member of the Inter-Government Risk Pool of the Texas Municipal League.

Ramirez won the nonpartisan runoff election for mayor in 1990; he defeated Maria Guadalupe "Bebe" Zuñiga (1933–2017) Zuñiga had first faced a court-ordered recount with a third candidate, Rick Reyes, to determine that she had won the right to challenge Ramirez by a margin of only nine votes. The incumbent, Aldo Tatangelo, was term-limited under the Laredo municipal charter and instead ran unsuccessfully later that year for county judge of Webb County. As mayor, Ramirez secured a permit for the construction of the World Trade Bridge. He also worked to build four recreation centers, three fire stations, and a new public library at the intersection of McPherson and Calton roads. Because Ramirez vacated the mayoral position at the end of his second term, a special election was called early in 1998 under the charter. Betty Flores, a former Laredo banker, won that contest and a few months later the regular city election as well.

=== Clinton administration ===
Ramirez resigned with several months remaining in his second term to take a position in the Clinton administration under United States Secretary of Housing and Urban Development, Andrew Cuomo. From 1997 to 1998, Ramirez was the assistant secretary for the Office of Community Planning and Development. On June 19, 1998, Clinton nominated him to become the United States Deputy Secretary of Housing and Urban Development, serving until the end of the administration in January 2001.

On January 1, 1997, the Laredo Morning Times named Ramriez "Laredoan of the Year". In 1995, he was named "Mayor of the Year" by the Texas Municipal Library Directors Association. In 1996, Newsweek magazine named him one of the twenty-five most dynamic mayors in the nation.

In 2008, the Congressional Hispanic Caucus and U.S. Representative Henry R. Cuellar of Laredo petitioned U.S. President-elect Barack Obama to choose Ramirez as HUD secretary. At the time, Ramirez served on Obama's transition team. Obama, however, selected Shaun Donovan for the role.

=== Later career ===
On March 17, 2010, Ramirez testified before the House Financial Services Committee on the Obama administration's "Choice Neighborhoods Initiative," also known as the "Proposal to Revitalize Severely Distressed Public and Assisted Housing."

Since that time, Ramirez has assisted various administrations in addressing and crafting national policy and program activities that relate to economic development and housing efforts.

Ramirez has over twenty years of experience as a risk management and insurance industry executive. He is currently a member of AFL–CIO Housing Investment Trust Building America Advisory Board and the Capital One Community Renewal Fund Advisory Board.

== Personal life ==
Ramirez and his wife, the former Aggie Ramos, have three children: Saul, Joaquin, and Alexis. They reside outside Washington, D.C. in Vienna, Virginia.

Preceded by Aldo Tatangelo	Mayor of Laredo, Texas; 1990–1997	Succeeded by Betty Flores
