= Archery Facilities Altos de Samán =

Archery facilities in Cabo Rojo, Puerto Rico

Instalaciones de Tiro con Arco Altos de Samán are archery facilities in Cabo Rojo, Puerto Rico. They were finished in 2010 and hosted the archery events for the 2010 Central American and Caribbean Games.
