= María Echavarría =

Colombian archer (born 1960)

Personal information
- Nationality: Colombian
- Born: 7 July 1960 (age 65) Bogotá, Colombia

Sport
- Sport: Archery
Medal record
Representing Colombia
Central American and Caribbean Games
Bronze medal – third place	1986 Santiago de los Caballeros	Recurve team

María Victoria Echavarría (born 7 July 1960) is a Colombian archer. She competed in the women's individual event at the 1992 Summer Olympics.
