= Archery at the 2010 Central American and Caribbean Games =

- Venue: Archery Facilities Altos de Samán
- Location: Mayagüez, Puerto Rico
- Dates: July 25–29

Archery Mascot at Mayagüez 2010

The Archery competition at the 2010 Central American and Caribbean Games was held in Mayagüez, Puerto Rico.

The tournament was scheduled to be held from 25–29 July at the Archery Facilities Altos de Samán in Porta del Sol.

== Medal summary ==
=== Men's events ===
Event	Gold	Silver	Bronze
Individual compound	Eduardo Gonzalez (VEN)	Jorge Jiménez (ESA)	Paris Goyco (DOM)
Team compound	El Salvador	Puerto Rico	Dominican Republic
Individual recurve	Juan René Serrano (MEX)	Pedro Vivas (MEX)	Oscar Guillen (ESA)
Team recurve	Mexico	El Salvador	Colombia

=== Women's events ===
Event	Gold	Silver	Bronze
Individual compound	Olga Bosch (VEN)	Linda Ochoa-Anderson (MEX)	Ana Crisanto (MEX)
Team compound	Venezuela	Mexico	Puerto Rico
Individual recurve	Aída Román (MEX)	Mariana Avitia (MEX)	Natalia Sánchez (COL)
Team recurve	Colombia	Mexico	Venezuela

=== Mixed events ===
Event	Gold	Silver	Bronze
Team compound	Venezuela	El Salvador	Mexico
Team recurve	Mexico	Venezuela	Colombia
