= Eduardo Magaña =

Mexican archer (born 1984)

Personal information
- Born: 10 March 1984 (age 41) Mérida, Yucatán, Mexico

Sport
- Sport: Archery

Eduardo Avelino Magaña Poot (born 10 March 1984) is a Mexican archer.

Magaña competed at the 2004 Summer Olympics. In the men's individual event, he was defeated in the first round of elimination, placing 49th overall. Magaña was also a member of the 12th-place Mexican men's archery team.
