= Kisik Lee =

South Korean archer

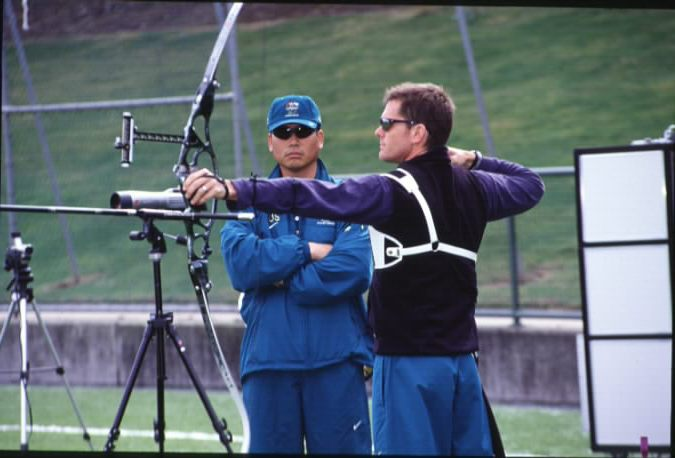
AIS Archery Coach Kisik Lee coaching Simon Fairweather in 2000

Kisik Lee (born 2 July 1957 in Seoul) is a Korean archer and coach, currently serving as head coach of the Australian Olympic recurve archery training program. Lee first served as the head coach of the Korean Olympic archery team. From 1997 to 2004, Lee was the Australian Institute of Sport head coach and coached 2000 gold medalist Simon Fairweather and 2004 bronze medalist Tim Cuddihy. He was head coach of Team USA from 2006 to 2024, and his archers claimed more than 300 Archery World Cup medals – nearly half of them gold – alongside three Olympic medals from 2012 to 2016 and world titles in recurve, indoor, field 3D and youth categories.

Lee is known for his extensive work with archer Brady Ellison on his way to becoming a member of the 2008 US Olympic Team and winning six World Cup medals, as well as reaching the final of the World Cup. Under Lee's coaching, by the 2012 London Olympics the US men were ranked first in the world and the US women were seventh.

== National Training System (NTS) and Kisik Lee (KSL) Shot Cycle ==
The National Training System (NTS) is the official method of shooting form that coaches are required to learn in order to be certified by USA Archery. Created by Kisik Lee, the NTS is based on his analysis of body control, muscular requirements, and mental concentration needed to generate a good shot.

NTS used to be known by the Biomechanical Efficient Shooting Technique (BEST) method of shot execution. Both the BEST Method and its newer, more advanced incarnation as the NTS contain many elements of Lee's Shot Cycle. The KSL Shot Cycle separates an archer's shot into twelve steps and focuses on biomechanics, the study of how best to apply mechanical principles to human physiological actions.

== Controversies ==
=== Religious coaching ===
Lee came under scrutiny during 2008 after The New York Times reported some athletes felt uncomfortable with his strong advocacy of a religious lifestyle for the athletes at the Olympic Training Center. According to the article, Lee frequently held Bible study classes, encouraged his archers to sing hymns and attend church, and sponsored the baptisms of at least four archers, including Brady Ellison.

A follow-up article from the Times in November of that year confirmed that Lee had ceased to mix spirituality and archery: "In a recent telephone interview, Lee said he no longer held Bible-study classes, and executives for USA Archery said they had explained to Lee that such behavior was unacceptable."

=== NTS ===
The same follow-up article in the Times named Lee "a controversial figure" who attracts two kinds of people: "fans who say his style brings uniformity to the sport, but also critics who are reluctant to give up their own methods."

Opponents of the NTS see Lee's efforts to change archery technique as negative, saying that the NTS stunts innovation and experimentation on the part of the athlete. Yet USA Archery has no policy forcing archers to adopt the method, and several top US archers have not made the switch, including Olympian Butch Johnson and Sydney Silver Medalist Vic Wunderle. Proponents of the NTS point to the repeatable nature of the system, and the logic of having a scientifically-based method that can be shared easily and implemented consistently on a nationwide basis.

Proponents of NTS often cite anecdotal evidence in claims that training with the NTS alleviated back or shoulder pain previously associated with shooting other techniques, as well as sports psychology issues such as target panic.

Teresa Iaconi, coach of 17-year-old 2012 Olympic hopeful Ariel Gibilaro, told ESPN that she was "once of NTS' biggest skeptics." Said Iaconi, "I refused to teach it for three years because I didn't understand it. But I read up on it, and I now understand that it is based on biomechanics. It doesn't stunt innovation because no one is forced to use the system. We have several top archers who don't use it. But what I like is that now we finally have an easy and repeatable way to teach archery."
