= Elías Malavé =

Venezuelan archer (born 1989)

Personal information
- Full name: Elías Javier Malavé Burgos
- Born: 26 October 1989 (age 36) Maturín, Venezuela
- Height: 180 cm (5 ft 11 in)
- Weight: 87 kg (192 lb)
Medal record
Men's recurve archery
Representing Venezuela
South American Games
Gold medal – first place	2010 Medellin	70 m
Bronze medal – third place	2010 Medellin	Team

Elías Javier Malavé Burgos (Note: In this Spanish name, the first or paternal surname is Malavé and the second or maternal family name is Burgos.) (born 26 October 1989 in Maturín, Venezuela) is a Venezuelan male archer who competed in the individual event at the 2012 Summer Olympics and 2016 Summer Olympics. He started archery in 2001 and has represented Venezuelan team since 2006.

== International tournaments and multi-sport events ==
Elías Malavé has competed in the Bolivarian Games (2009 - 2013), South American Games (2010 - 2014), Central American and Caribbean Games (2010–2014), Panamerican Games (2011 - 2015), Olympic Games (2012, 2016), World Archery Championships (2006 Youth - 2011 Outdoor - 2012 Indoor - 2015 Outdoor), Archery World Cup (Since 2007 until 2015), the Panamerican Archery Championships and continental events.

== National tournaments ==
Elías Malavé has competed in several national tournaments in Venezuela, winning the title of National Champion 12 times.
