= Ana Rendón =

Colombian archer (born 1986)

Personal information
- Full name: Ana María Rendón Martínez
- Born: March 10, 1986 (age 40) Medellín, Colombia

Sport
- Country: Colombia
- Sport: Archery
- Event: Recurve
Medal record
Representing Colombia
Women's recurve archery
Event	1st	2nd	3rd
World Cup	0	1	0
Indoor World Series	0	1	0
Pan American Games	2	2	3
Pan American Championships	1	2	0
CAC Games	3	6	3
South American Games	4	5	2
Bolivarian Games	12	3	0
Total	22	20	8
Pan American Games
Gold medal – first place	2007 Rio de Janeiro	Team
Gold medal – first place	2015 Toronto	Team
Silver medal – second place	2015 Toronto	Individual
Silver medal – second place	2019 Lima	Mixed team
Bronze medal – third place	2007 Rio de Janeiro	Individual
Bronze medal – third place	2019 Lima	Team
Bronze medal – third place	2023 Santiago	Team
Pan American Championships
Gold medal – first place	2012 San Salvador	Team
Silver medal – second place	2012 San Salvador	Individual
Silver medal – second place	2021 Monterrey	Team
Central American and Caribbean Games
Gold medal – first place	2010 Mayagüez	Team
Gold medal – first place	2014 Veracruz	Individual
Gold medal – first place	2014 Veracruz	Mixed team
Silver medal – second place	2014 Veracruz	Team
Silver medal – second place	2018 Barranquilla	Team
Silver medal – second place	2023 San Salvador	Individual
Silver medal – second place	2023 San Salvador	Team
Silver medal – second place	2026 Santo Domingo	Team
Silver medal – second place	2026 Santo Domingo	Mixed team
Bronze medal – third place	2006 Cartagena	Team
Bronze medal – third place	2018 Barranquilla	Mixed team
Bronze medal – third place	2026 Santo Domingo	Individual
South American Games
Gold medal – first place	2014 Santiago	Individual
Gold medal – first place	2014 Santiago	Team
Gold medal – first place	2022 Asunción	Mixed team
Gold medal – first place	2026 Santa Fe	Individual
Silver medal – second place	2010 Medellín	Individual 70 m
Silver medal – second place	2010 Medellín	Team
Silver medal – second place	2018 Cochabamba	Team
Silver medal – second place	2022 Asunción	Team
Silver medal – second place	2026 Santa Fe	Team
Bronze medal – third place	2018 Cochabamba	Mixed team
Bronze medal – third place	2014 Santiago	Mixed team
Bolivarian Games
Gold medal – first place	2013 Trujillo	Individual
Gold medal – first place	2013 Trujillo	Individual 30 m
Gold medal – first place	2013 Trujillo	Individual 50 m
Gold medal – first place	2013 Trujillo	Individual 60 m
Gold medal – first place	2013 Trujillo	Individual FITA lap
Gold medal – first place	2013 Trujillo	Team
Gold medal – first place	2013 Trujillo	Mixed team
Gold medal – first place	2017 Santa Marta	Individual 70 m
Gold medal – first place	2017 Santa Marta	Team
Gold medal – first place	2017 Santa Marta	Mixed team
Gold medal – first place	2022 Valledupar	Team
Gold medal – first place	2025 Lima-Ayacucho	Team
Silver medal – second place	2013 Trujillo	Individual 70 m
Silver medal – second place	2017 Santa Marta	Individual
Silver medal – second place	2022 Valledupar	Mixed team

Ana María Rendón Martínez (born March 10, 1986) is a Colombian recurve archer. She has competed in the Olympic Games three times and is a two-time gold medalist at the Pan American Games.

== Career ==
=== 2008 Summer Olympics ===
At the 2008 Summer Olympics in Beijing Rendón finished her ranking round with a total of 647 points. This gave her the 10th seed for the final competition bracket in which she faced Elena Tonetta in the first round. Both archers scored 106 points in the regular match, but in the decisive extra round Rendón scored 10 points against 9 for Tonetta and advanced to the next round. There she won with 110–106 against Miroslava Dagbaeva. In the round of 16 she could only score 95 points and as her opponent Khatuna Lorig scored 107 points Rendón was eliminated. Together with Natalia Sánchez and Sigrid Romero she also took part in the team event. With her 647 score from the ranking round combined with the 643 of Sánchez and the 551 of Romero the Colombian team was in tenth position after the ranking round. In the first round they faced the Japanese team, but were unable to beat them. Japan advanced to the quarter finals with a 206–199 score.

=== 2012 Summer Olympics ===
Rendón competed again at the 2012 Summer Olympics, this time only in the individual event. She finished as the twelfth seed in the ranking round but was defeated by Iria Grandal in the opening elimination round.

=== 2016 Summer Olympics ===
Rendon represented Colombia at her third Olympics, the 2016 Summer Olympics in Rio de Janeiro.

=== Pan American Games ===
Rendón achieved two medals at the 2007 Pan American Games, winning the women's team gold medal and placing third in the women's individual event to secure the bronze medal. She did not participate in the 2011 Games four years later after she and her teammates Natalia Sánchez and Sigrid Romero disagreed with the training approach taken by the national coach Kim Hag Yong, with the trio requesting that Kim be replaced. The request was refused and the three were subsequently withdrawn from the competition by the Colombian Olympic Committee.

Rendón returned to the Pan American Games in 2015, winning the women's team gold medal with Sánchez and María Sepúlveda before finishing as the runner-up in the women's individual event to Khatuna Lorig.
