= Roberval dos Santos =

Brazilian archer (born 1969)

Medal record

Men's compound archery

Representing Brazil

Archery World Cup
Bronze medal – third place	2007 Dubai	Individual

South American Games
Gold medal – first place	2010 Medellin	30 m
Gold medal – first place	2010 Medellin	Overall
Silver medal – second place	2010 Medellin	50 m
Silver medal – second place	2010 Medellin	90 m
Silver medal – second place	2010 Medellin	Men's team

Roberval "Tico" dos Santos (born November 15, 1969, in São Paulo) is a Brazilian archer.

== Early years ==
Dos Santos started in archery for fun in 1989, when he bought his first bow. From 1989 to 1994 archery was only a hobby. In 1995, he became a professional archer. In this year he placed second in the Brazilian Nationals. In 1996, he was appointed to the national team to compete the Pan-American Championship in Mexico City. In 1997 he went to his first World Championships, where he finished eighth.

== After Archery World Cup ==
In 2006, the International Archery Federation FITA started a new form of international competition, the FITA Archery World Cup, with four stages in four countries. The best four archers in each category compete for the World Cup title in an additional stage.

In this new form of competition, and with a money prize, the archers throughout the world were able to meet more frequently and compete in the higher level.

In 2006, dos Santos won the third stage in Antalya, Turkey, making him the first Brazilian to win a World Class Event in archery.

In 2007, he finished third, fourth, and ninth in three of the four stages, advancing to the World Cup Finals in Dubai. In the semi-finals, he lost the match to Jorge Jimenes of El Salvador in the tie-breaker arrow. He then defeated Sebatien Brasseur of France to win the bronze medal. He finished 2007 in the third place in the World Ranking.

In 2008, he broke the Pan American record with 1403 points, in the Round FITA (of a maximum 1440 points), becoming the 17th person to shoot above 1400 points in the world.
