= Betty Flores =

American banker and former mayor

The Honorable Elizabeth G. "Betty" Flores

Mayor of Laredo, Texas
- In office 1998–2006
- Preceded by: Saul N. Ramirez, Jr.
- Succeeded by: Raul G. Salinas

Personal details
- Born: Elizabeth Garcia
- Party: Democratic

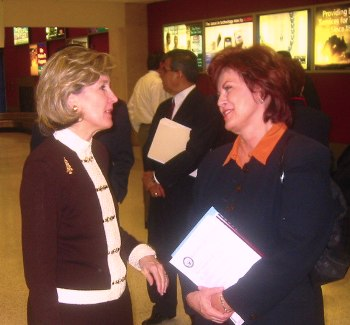
Kay Bailey Hutchison and Betty Flores

Elizabeth G. "Betty" Flores (born December 28, 1944) is an American banker and former mayor of Laredo, Texas. She was the first Latina woman to be mayor in Laredo's 240 year history.

== Career ==
Flores was originally hired by Laredo National Bank to work as a secretary. Over a 28 year career, worked her way up to become the first female senior vice president in the bank's history. Much of her time at the bank was spent in business development, during which she made a large number of contacts in the Laredo community. She eventually ran the loan department.

After leaving the bank, Flores went to work for the Aztec Economic Development and Preservation Corporation. While working at Aztec, a nonprofit that buildings housing for people with low incomes, that she began to grow interested in local politics. Flores also worked as a county affordable-housing officer and as a consumer advocate for the Federal Reserve Board.

== Mayor of Laredo ==
When Flores was first married, she and her husband agreed that they could work in any field they wanted, except for politics. By the time she ran for mayor, however, both independently thought it was a good idea. As others, all men, began to announce their candidacies for mayor, she thought several were of questionable character. Flores spoke with then-Governor Ann Richards at the 1997 National Conference of La Raza about a potential run. Richards gave Flores advice and then her endorsement. Eight others would eventually throw their hats into the ring. She won her first term in a special runoff election in early 1998, winning 55.39% of the voted. She won a full four year term in the May 1998 election.

Flores was the first Mexican-American and Tejana female mayor of a major American city along the United States' border with Mexico. Cross-border issues became a major concern for Flores, and she gained media attention when she suggested that border patrol agents should give illegal immigrants "a bottle of water and send them on their way." Laredo sits at the start of Interstate 35, a major border crossing that carries goods from Mexico into the United States. Following the adoption of the North American Free Trade Agreement in 1994, Laredo became one of the fastest growing metropolitan areas in the country.

She is a Democrat.

== Personal life ==
Flores has a younger sister, Edna Garcia. Her father, Eloy Garcia Sr., was a local official in Laredo who used his connections to help Flores become mayor. On election night, he wrote an ambulance to the victory party and died a week after she was sworn into office.

In the 9th grade, she punched a classmate in the nose after he bemoaned Flores' victory in the election for class president. Flores dropped out of high school two credits shy of graduation. She later completed her diploma.

Flores met her husband, Antonio "Tony" Flores, after a local newspaper ran a photograph of her when she was 15 and he was 18. The couple married when she was 17 and he was 20. They had two children before her 20th birthday. Early in their marriage, when Flores first went to work outside the house, Tony was upset and refused to speak to her.

Her 19 year old son, Tony Jr., was killed in 1986 by a drunk driver. Following his death, she joined Mothers Against Drunk Driving and spoke to students as part of Texas War on Drugs, a program run by Ross Perot. She is a grandmother.

== Works cited ==
- Navarro, Sharon Ann (2008). Latina Legislator: Leticia Van de Putte and the Road to Leadership. Texas A&M University Press. ISBN 978-1-60344-062-2.
- García, Sonia R.; Martinez-Ebers, Valerie; Irasema, Coronado; Navarro, Sharon A.; Jaramillo, Patricia A. (June 3, 2009). Políticas: Latina Public Officials in Texas. University of Texas Press. ISBN 978-0-292-77998-3.
