= Denisse van Lamoen =

Chilean archer (born 1979)

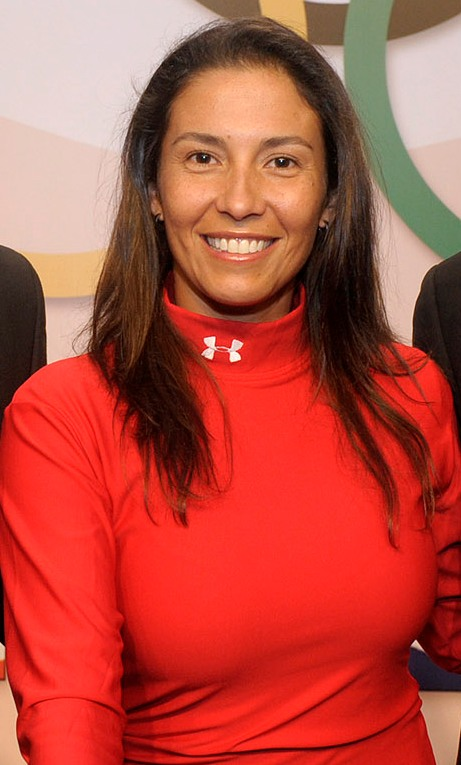

Personal information
- Full name: Denisse Astrid van Lamoen Gómez
- Born: 12 September 1979 (age 46) Arica, Chile

Sport
- Sport: Archery
Medal record
Representing Chile
World Championships
Gold medal – first place	2011 Turin	Individual recurve
Pan American Games
Silver medal – second place	1999 Winnipeg	Individual
South American Games
Bronze medal – third place	2010 Medellín	Recurve 30m
Bronze medal – third place	2010 Medellín	Individual recurve

Denisse Astrid van Lamoen (born 12 September 1979) is a Chilean archer. In 2000, she became the first Chilean archer to compete at the Summer Olympics, but after failing a drug test in 2002 she left archery to study law. She later returned to the sport. In 2011, she was voted "Chile's Athlete of the Year" after winning at the 2011 World Archery Championships. She was selected to be Chile's flag-bearer at the 2012 Summer Olympics. She is of Dutch descent.

== Career ==
In 2000 van Lamoen married Dr. Norman MacMillan. Their marriage lasted three years. That same year she became the first Chilean to participate in archery at the Olympic Games in Sydney, but she had a brief and lackluster performance. In the double round of 70 (two rounds of 36 arrows at 70 meters away), she achieved 605 points, leaving it in the last 52 of the standings. In the removal round, she had to face Sayoko Kawauchi (Japanese, sixth in the standings with 654 points), and lost the match by 151 to 146.

=== Doping and subsequent fluctuations (2002–2010) ===
In 2002, van Lamoen had an outstanding participation at the VII South American Games held in Brazil, where she earned 7 medals (6 gold and 1 silver). However, all would be overshadowed by a doping test that tested positive in amphetamine, after which she was disqualified and had to return all earned medals. Although the Chilean Federation of Archery (Fechta) fined van Lamoen with a suspension for one year, the International Federation of Archery (FITA) decided to extend the punishment to two years, decision that the athlete appealed later, because the punishment exceeded international regulations. The appeal at the Court of Appeals of Santiago was later on accepted. After a Supreme Court ruling, Fechta also lowered its initial penalty of one year to six months.

Van Lamoen achieved fifth place in the XIV Pan American Games in Santo Domingo 2003. In Venezuela, in 2004, van Lamoen won four gold medals and one silver, achieving 4 Panamerican records, which were recently beaten in 2010. However, she could not participate representing Chile at the Olympic Games in Athens, as the team from Mexico filled the vacancy to which she aspired. In 2006, she won two gold medals at the VIII South American Games. At the XV Pan American Games in Rio de Janeiro 2007, she reached the second stage, where she was eliminated by American Jennifer Nichols.

After a break of two years to resume her studies, van Lamoen returned to competition in 2009, beating four Chilean records. In January 2010, she qualified to participate in the IX South American Games, held in Medellín, where she earned a bronze medal (30 meters, with a score of 343 points) and a bronze medal in the elimination round, where she defeated Ana Rendón of Colombia by a narrow lead of 99 to 98.

London 2012 Olympic games: Denisse Van Lamoen was knocked out of the women's Olympic archery competition by Georgia's Kristine Esebua, who won with a 6–0 victory.

Olympic Games
Preceded by Jorge Mandrú	Flagbearer for Chile; London 2012	Succeeded by Dominique Ohaco
