= Luzmary Guedez =

Venezuelan archer (born 1981)

Medal record

Women's archery

Representing Venezuela

World Championships
Bronze medal – third place	2011 Turin	Team

World Cup
Gold medal – first place	2009 Copenhagen	Individual

Central American and Caribbean Games
Gold medal – first place	2010 Mayagüez	Team
Bronze medal – third place	2006 Cartagena	Individual

Pan-American Championships
Silver medal – second place	2008 Valencia	Individual

Luzmary Guedez (born 9 August 1981 in Yaracuy) is a Venezuelan compound archer. She was the winner of the 2009 FITA Archery World Cup final, and won several World Cup stages from 2007–09, as well as winning medals in a range of national, regional and international individual and team competitions.

In 2009, she became the number one ranked women's compound archer in the world.
