= Bernardo Oliveira (archer) =

Brazilian archer (born 1993)

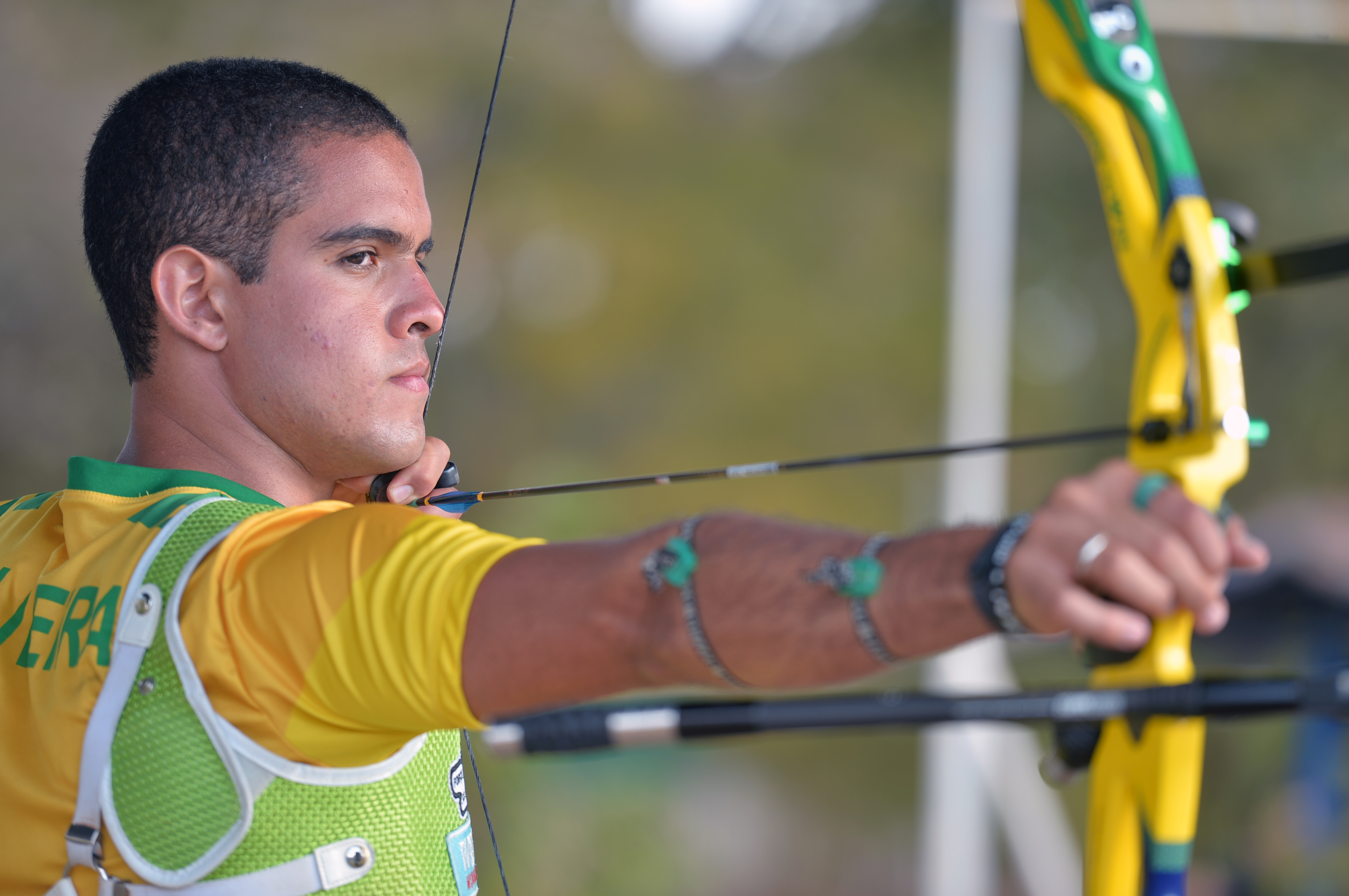
- Oliveira in 2016

Personal information
- Full name: Bernardo de Souza Oliveira
- Born: 8 June 1993 (age 33) Brasília, Brazil
Medal record
Men's recurve archery
Representing Brazil
Pan American Games
Bronze medal – third place	2015 Toronto	Men's team
South American Games
Gold medal – first place	2010 Medellín	30 m
Gold medal – first place	2010 Medellín	50 m
Gold medal – first place	2010 Medellín	90 m
Gold medal – first place	2010 Medellín	Overall
Silver medal – second place	2010 Medellín	Team
Bronze medal – third place	2010 Medellín	Individual
Military World Games
Bronze medal – third place	2015 Mungyeong	Mixed team

Bernardo de Souza Oliveira (born June 8, 1993) is a Brazilian athlete who competes in recurve archery.

He was one of the most successful athletes in the Brazilian team at the 2010 South American Games, in Medellín, Colombia, winning six medals total, 4 gold, one silver and one bronze.
