= Sigrid Romero =

Colombian archer (born 1989)

Personal information
- Born: May 22, 1989 (age 37) Cali, Colombia
Medal record
Women's recurve archery
Representing Colombia
Pan American Games
Gold medal – first place	2007 Rio de Janeiro	Team

Sigrid Romero (born May 22, 1989) is a Colombian archer.

== Early life ==
Romero was born in Cali, Colombia, the daughter of Ramon Romero and Patricia Duque. Her name in German means triumphal procession, in the beginning she tried the swimming and gymnastics when she was 10 years old. She started in 2003 where she excelled in a national competition in Bogotá, where was the winner of five golds medals.

== 2008 Summer Olympics ==
At the 2008 Summer Olympics in Beijing Romero finished her ranking round with a total of 551 points. This gave her the 62nd seed for the final competition bracket in which she faced Joo Hyun-Jung in the first round. With a score of only 98 points she was unable to stop the third seeded South Korean, who eventually would reach the quarter-final. Together with Natalia Sánchez and Ana Rendón she also took part in the team event. With her 551 score from the ranking round combined with the 643 of Sánchez and the 647 of Rendón the Colombian team was in tenth position after the ranking round. In the first round they faced the Japanese team, but were unable to beat them. Japan advanced to the quarter-finals with a 206−199 score.

== 2010 Sud Americanos Games ==
At the 2010 Sud Americanos Games in Medellín, Colombia Romero won 3 gold, 2 silver and 1 bronze medals with 30 meters, 50 meters and 70 meters curved.
