= Natalia Sánchez (archer) =

Colombian archer (born 1983)

Personal information
- Full name: Natalia Sánchez Echeverri
- Born: 20 May 1983 (age 43) Medellín, Antioquia, Colombia
- Height: 166 cm (5 ft 5 in)
- Weight: 63 kg (139 lb)
Medal record
Women's recurve archery
Representing Colombia
World Championships
Bronze medal – third place	2009 Ulsan	Individual
Pan American Games
Gold medal – first place	2007 Rio de Janeiro	Team
Gold medal – first place	2015 Toronto	Team
Central American and Caribbean Games
Gold medal – first place	2006 Cartagena	Individual 30 m
Gold medal – first place	2006 Cartagena	Individual 50 m
Gold medal – first place	2006 Cartagena	Individual 70 m
Gold medal – first place	2006 Cartagena	Individual FITA 1440
Gold medal – first place	2010 Mayagüez	Team
Silver medal – second place	2006 Cartagena	Individual
Silver medal – second place	2006 Cartagena	Individual 60 m
Silver medal – second place	2014 Veracruz	Team
Bronze medal – third place	2006 Cartagena	Team
Bronze medal – third place	2010 Mayagüez	Individual
Bronze medal – third place	2010 Mayagüez	Mixed team
Bronze medal – third place	2014 Veracruz	Individual

Natalia "Nati" Sánchez Echeverri (Note: In this Spanish name, the first or paternal surname is Sánchez and the second or maternal family name is Echeverri.) (born 20 May 1983) is a Colombian recurve archer. She is a two-time Olympian, contesting the 2008 and 2016 Games, a World Championship bronze medalist, and a two-time Pan American champion in the women's team event. Sánchez was born in Medellín, Antioquia.

== Career ==
=== Olympic Games ===
At the 2008 Summer Olympics in Beijing, Sánchez finished her ranking round with a total of 643 points. This gave her the 18th seed for the final competition bracket in which she faced Katsiarina Muliuk in the first round. Despite the archer from Belarus being only the 47th seed, she managed to upset Sánchez and eliminate her with a 104–101 score. Together with Ana Rendón and Sigrid Romero she also took part in the team event. With her 643 score from the ranking round combined with the 647 of Rendón and the 551 of Romero the Colombian team was in tenth position after the ranking round. In the first round they faced the Japanese team, but were unable to beat them. Japan advanced to the quarter finals with a 206–199 score.

Sanchez also represented Colombia at the 2016 Summer Olympics in Rio de Janeiro.

=== Pan American Games ===
Sánchez achieved a gold medal in the women's team event at the 2007 Pan American Games alongside Ana Rendón and Sigrid Romero, Colombia's first gold medal in the event at the Games. She did not compete in the 2011 Games four years later due to a dispute between Sánchez, Rendón, and Romero and the Colombian national coach Kim Hag Yong. Following the archers' lack of confidence in Kim's training methods and their refusal to work with him, the three were withdrawn from the Games by the Colombian Olympic Committee.
