= Leidys Brito =

Venezuelan archer (born 1984)

Personal information
- Full name: Leidys Milagros Brito
- Born: 5 July 1984 (age 41) Maturín, Monagas, Venezuela
- Height: 169 cm (5 ft 7 in)
- Weight: 78 kg (172 lb)
Medal record
Women's archery
Representing Venezuela
Pan American Games
Bronze medal – third place	2003 Santo Domingo	Team
Central American and Caribbean Games
Silver medal – second place	2006 Cartagena	Team
Bronze medal – third place	2006 Cartagena	Individual

Leidys Milagros Brito (born 5 July 1984) is an athlete from Venezuela who competes in archery.

== 2008 Summer Olympics ==
At the 2008 Summer Olympics in Beijing, Brito finished her ranking round with a total of 628 points. This gave her the 36th seed for the final competition bracket in which she faced Wu Hui-Ju in the first round, beating the archer from Chinese Taipei 104–98. In the second round she was unable to beat fourth seed Khatuna Narimanidze of Georgia who won the confrontation with 111–98.

== 2012 Summer Olympics ==
At the 2012 Summer Olympics in London, Brito finished the ranking round with 634 points, and drew Cheng Ming in the first knockout round. She lost to Cheng, who was the eventual silver medallist.
