= 2013 World Archery Championships – Men's individual recurve =

2013 World Archery Championships
Men	Recurve	Compound
Women	Recurve	Compound
Team	Men's recurve	Men's compound
Team	Women's recurve	Women's compound
Mixed team	Recurve	Compound

The men's individual recurve competition at the 2013 World Archery Championships took place on 29 September – 6 October 2013 in Belek, Turkey.

146 archers from 62 countries entered the competition, with a maximum of three entries per country. The top 104 archers qualified for the knockout tournament, with the top 8 scores in qualifying receiving a bye to the third round. Reigning champion Kim Woo-jin was not selected as part of the South Korean representation. Nevertheless, for the fifth Championships in succession the title was won by a Korean, in this case 18-year-old Lee Seung-yun, who in his first season representing Korea defeated teammate, Olympic champion, World Cup champion, and world number one archer Oh Jin-hyek in the final in 5 sets.

== Schedule ==
All times are local (UTC+02:00).

Date	Time	Phase
29 September	14:00	Official practice
1 October	09:00	Qualification
2 October	11:15	1/48 and 1/24 Eliminations
3 October	09:30	1/16, 1/8, QF, and SF Eliminations
6 October	16:20	Medal matches

== Qualification round ==
Pre-tournament world rankings ('WR') are taken from the 28 August 2013 World Archery Rankings. Qualification consisted of 4 rounds of 36 arrows, at 90m, 70m, 50m, and 30m. This was the last World Archery Championships in which a 30m round was used in qualification. A three-way shootoff was required to determine 7–9th places.

Bye to third round
Qualified for eliminations

Rank	Name	Nation	Score	WR
1	Oh Jin-hyek	South Korea	1357	1
2	Lee Seung-yun	South Korea	1352	5
3	Im Dong-hyun	South Korea	1348	2
4	Jean-Charles Valladont	France	1341	23
5	Mauro Nespoli	Italy	1340	11
6	Dai Xiaoxiang	China	1336	4
7	Gaël Prévost	France	1335	12
8	Taylor Worth	Australia	1335	32
9	Brady Ellison	United States	1335	3
10	Sjef van den Berg	Netherlands	1334	61
11	Alexey Nikolaev	Russia	1334	n/a
12	Crispin Duenas	Canada	1334	24
13	Rick van der Ven	Netherlands	1333	8
14	Juan Ignacio Rodríguez	Spain	1332	30
15	Jayanta Talukdar	India	1331	50
16	Tarundeep Rai	India	1330	29
17	Xing Yu	China	1329	36
18	Luis Álvarez	Mexico	1326	13
19	Khairul Anuar Mohamad	Malaysia	1326	10
20	Jantsan Gantugs	Mongolia	1325	33
21	Takaharu Furukawa	Japan	1323	7
22	Kapil	India	1322	n/a
23	Larry Godfrey	United Kingdom	1321	18
24	Bolot Tsybzhitov	Russia	1320	51
25	Eduardo Vélez	Mexico	1320	43
26	Jay Lyon	Canada	1319	38
27	Bård Nesteng	Norway	1314	25
28	Markiyan Ivashko	Ukraine	1313	21
29	Jake Kaminski	United States	1312	46
30	Juan René Serrano	Mexico	1311	14
31	Viktor Ruban	Ukraine	1311	17
32	Marcus Vinicius D'Almeida	Brazil	1309	n/a
33	Kuo Cheng-wei	Chinese Taipei	1308	31
34	Matthew Gray	Australia	1306	416
35	Shohei Ota	Japan	1305	71
36	Jon Chol	North Korea	1302	125
37	Atiq Bazil Bakri	Malaysia	1301	73
38	Gombodorj Gan-Erdene	Mongolia	1299	60
39	Ryan Tyack	Australia	1299	95
40	Shungo Tabata	Japan	1298	41
41	Piotr Nowak	Poland	1298	70
42	Cevdet Demiral	Turkey	1297	111
43	Daniel Pacheco	Colombia	1295	118
44	Chang Wei-hsiang	Chinese Taipei	1294	218
45	Alan Wills	United Kingdom	1294	96
46	Haziq Kamaruddin	Malaysia	1294	63
47	Jeff Henckels	Luxembourg	1293	9
48	Sebastian Rohrberg	Germany	1292	354
49	Michele Frangilli	Italy	1291	42
50	Thomas Faucheron	France	1291	40
51	Mikalai Marusau	Belarus	1291	158
52	Slawomir Naploszek	Poland	1290	69
53	Amadeo Tonelli	Italy	1290	155
54	Simon Nesemann	Germany	1290	n/a
55	Chui Chun Man	Hong Kong	1289	192
56	Alexander Liahushev	Belarus	1289	n/a
57	Elias Cuesta	Spain	1289	64
58	Keith Hanlon	Ireland	1288	307
59	Guy Matzkin	Israel	1288	93
60	Antonio Fernández	Spain	1286	34
61	Dan Olaru	Moldova	1286	88
62	Rick van den Oever	Netherlands	1285	27
63	Antti Tekoniemi	Finland	1284	100
64	Zhang Jianping	China	1284	16
65	Jaka Komočar	Slovenia	1282	160
66	Witthaya Thamwong	Thailand	1281	91
67	Denchai Thepna	Thailand	1280	310
68	Guillermo Aguilar Gimpel	Chile	1279	77
69	Daniel Xavier	Brazil	1279	57
70	Johan Weiss	Denmark	1278	112
71	Joe Fanchin	United States	1277	28
72	Domingos Repas	Portugal	1277	n/a
73	Khomkrit Duangsuwan	Thailand	1276	259
74	Daniel Ciornei	Romania	1275	212
75	Sebastian Djerf	Sweden	1273	417
76	Alexander Bertschler	Austria	1273	n/a
77	Ashe Morgan	United Kingdom	1272	n/a
78	Bair Tsybekdorzhiev	Russia	1271	20
79	Chu Shu-yu	Chinese Taipei	1270	n/a
80	Md Ruhan Shana	Bangladesh	1270	359
81	Rafał Dobrowolski	Poland	1269	49
82	Kerem Kirsever	Turkey	1269	82
83	Yaroslav Mokrynsky	Ukraine	1267	109
84	Christoffer Furnes	Norway	1265	178
85	Razvan Marcu	Romania	1275	522
86	Fatih Bozlar	Turkey	1263	247
87	Hugh MacDonald	Canada	1261	225
88	Raphael Dutzler	Austria	1258	n/a
89	Daniel Pineda	Colombia	1257	72
90	Baasanjav Dolgorsuren	Mongolia	1256	390
91	Oibek Saidiyev	Kazakhstan	1256	142
92	Andrés Pila	Colombia	1255	83
93	Samuli Piippo	Finland	1254	174
94	Pearu Jakob Ojamae	Estonia	1253	n/a
95	Christian Weiss	Germany	1253	269
96	Marcos A. Bortoloto	Brazil	1253	89
97	Matija Mihalić	Croatia	1251	n/a
98	Artyom Gankin	Kazakhstan	1251	392
99	Arpad Banda	Hungary	1248	n/a
100	Philippe Kouassi	Ivory Coast	1248	151
101	Hugo Eduardo Robles	Argentina	1247	106
102	Andres Alfonseca	Dominican Republic	1245	165
103	Lakmal Chaminda Rajasinghe	Sri Lanka	1244	241
104	Thomas Rufer	Switzerland	1244	n/a
105	Paul Andre Hagen	Norway	1242	274
106	Shiek Sojeb	Bangladesh	1241	140
107	Vedran Orlić	Croatia	1240	n/a
108	Muhammed Durul Huda	Bangladesh	1239	404
109	Modestas Šliauteris	Lithuania	1238	n/a
110	Mimis El Helali	Cyprus	1237	386
111	Matúš Hanzlík	Slovakia	1233	n/a
112	Eduards Lapsins	Latvia	1227	n/a
113	Miguel Ramos	Venezuela	1226	483
114	Nader Manoochehrimoghadam	Iran	1225	n/a
115	Martin Horňák	Slovakia	1225	n/a
116	Adrian Faber	Switzerland	1223	n/a
117	Kęstutis Timinskas	Lithuania	1222	n/a
118	Martin Polakovic	Slovakia	1220	n/a
119	Fabian Cardenas	Argentina	1218	164
120	Björn Jansson	Sweden	1212	n/a
121	Lenardas Bernotas	Lithuania	1210	n/a
122	Jaanus Gross	Estonia	1209	418
123	Luka Grozdanović	Serbia	1208	222
124	Tanel Kaasik	Estonia	1207	n/a
125	Stefanos Tserkezis	Greece	1207	396
126	Pyry Ekholm	Finland	1202	n/a
127	Erwin Rebernig	Austria	1197	n/a
128	Arshak Petrosyan	Armenia	1193	254
129	Denis Gankin	Kazakhstan	1192	78
130	Ricardo Vásquez	Venezuela	1189	517
131	Charalambos Charalambous	Cyprus	1185	276
132	Stephane Kraus	Luxembourg	1184	n/a
133	Luc Schuler	Luxembourg	1183	n/a
134	Ahmed Mahmmood	Iraq	1171	n/a
135	Karlis Akots Gribulis	Latvia	1168	n/a
136	Genaro Riccio	Argentina	1167	135
137	Akpa Samuel Bethel Essis	Ivory Coast	1153	n/a
138	Dragan Svilanović	Serbia	1142	n/a
139	Konstantinos Loizou	Cyprus	1134	224
140	Nima Wangdi	Bhutan	1084	n/a
141	Ho Wing Kwong	Hong Kong	1078	n/a
142	Hazir Asllani	Kosovo	1062	n/a
143	Atdhe Luzhnica	Kosovo	975	n/a
144	Tanoh Herbert Kouadio	Ivory Coast	934	n/a
145	Bardhyl Luzhnica	Kosovo	924	564
146	Imad Azad Safwat	Iraq	DNS	n/a

== Elimination rounds ==
=== Top half ===
==== Section 1 ====
1st round
1	(South Korea) Oh Jin-hyek
Bye
33	(Chinese Taipei) Kuo Cheng-wei	1	0	1	0
80	(Bangladesh) Md Ruhan Shana	1	2	1	2
81	(Poland) Rafał Dobrowolski	0	0	1	0
32	(Brazil) Marcus Vinicius D'Almeida	2	2	1	2
17	(China) Xing Yu	2	0	1	2	2
96	(Brazil) Marcos A. Bortoloto	0	2	1	0	0
65	(Slovenia) Jaka Komočar	2	2	2
48	(Germany) Sebastian Rohrberg	0	0	0
49	(Italy) Michele Frangilli	0	0	2	2	1^{0}
64	(China) Zhang Jianping	2	2	0	0	1^{1}
97	(Croatia) Matija Mihalić	0	0	2	0
16	(India) Tarundeep Rai	2	2	0	2

2nd round
1	(South Korea) Oh Jin-hyek
Bye
80	(Bangladesh) Md Ruhan Shana	2	0	0	2	1^{0}
32	(Brazil) Marcus Vinicius D'Almeida	0	2	2	0	1^{1}
17	(China) Xing Yu	2	1	2	0	2
54	(Slovenia) Jaka Komočar	0	1	0	2	0
64	(China) Zhang Jianping	1	2	1	0	0
16	(India) Tarundeep Rai	1	0	1	2	2

3rd round
1	(South Korea) Oh Jin-hyek	1	2	2	2
32	(Brazil) Marcus Vinicius D'Almeida	1	0	0	0
17	(China) Xing Yu	2	2	0	0	0
16	(India) Tarundeep Rai	0	0	2	2	2

4th round
1	(South Korea) Oh Jin-hyek	2	2	2
16	(India) Tarundeep Rai	0	0	0

==== Section 2 ====
1st round
9	(United States) Brady Ellison	2	2	2
104	(Switzerland) Thomas Rufer	0	0	0
57	(Spain) Elias Cuesta	0	0	2	0
56	(Belarus) Alexander Liahushev	2	2	0	2
41	(Poland) Piotr Nowak	0	2	2	0	0
72	(Portugal) Domingos Repas	2	0	0	2	2
89	(Colombia) Daniel Pineda	0	2	1	0	2^{1}
24	(Russia) Bolot Tsybzhitov	2	0	1	2	0^{0}
25	(Mexico) Eduardo Vélez	2	0	0	2	2
88	(Austria) Raphael Dutzler	0	2	2	0	0
73	(Thailand) Khomkrit Duangsuwan	2	0	2	0	1^{1}
40	(Japan) Shungo Tabata	0	2	0	2	1^{0}
8	(Australia) Taylor Worth
Bye

2nd round
9	(United States) Brady Ellison	0	0	0
56	(Belarus) Alexander Liahushev	2	2	2
72	(Portugal) Domingos Repas	2	0	2	2
89	(Colombia) Daniel Pineda	0	2	0	0
25	(Mexico) Eduardo Vélez	0	1	2	1	0
73	(Thailand) Khomkrit Duangsuwan	2	1	0	1	2
8	(Australia) Taylor Worth
Bye

3rd round
56	(Belarus) Alexander Liahushev	0	0	2	0
72	(Portugal) Domingos Repas	2	2	0	2
73	(Thailand) Khomkrit Duangsuwan	0	2	0	1	1
8	(Australia) Taylor Worth	2	0	2	1	1

4th round
72	(Portugal) Domingos Repas	0	1	0	0
8	(Australia) Taylor Worth	2	1	2	2

==== Section 3 ====
1st round
5	(Italy) Mauro Nespoli
Bye
37	(Malaysia) Atiq Bazil Bakri	2	2	2
76	(Austria) Alexander Bertschler	0	0	0
85	(Romania) Razvan Marcu	0	0	0
28	(Ukraine) Markiyan Ivashko	2	2	2
21	(Japan) Takaharu Furukawa	1	2	2	2
92	(Colombia) Andrés Pila	1	0	0	0
69	(Brazil) Daniel Xavier	0	0	1	1
44	(Chinese Taipei) Chang Wei-hsiang	2	2	1	1
53	(Italy) Amadeo Tonelli	2	0	2	1	0^{1}
60	(Spain) Antonio Fernández	0	2	0	1	2^{0}
101	(Argentina) Hugo Eduardo Robles	0	2	0	0
12	(Canada) Crispin Duenas	2	0	2	2

2nd round
5	(Italy) Mauro Nespoli
Bye
37	(Malaysia) Atiq Bazil Bakri	0	1	1	1	2^{0}
28	(Ukraine) Markiyan Ivashko	2	1	1	1	0^{1}
21	(Japan) Takaharu Furukawa	2	1	2	2
44	(Chinese Taipei) Chang Wei-hsiang	0	1	0	0
53	(Italy) Amadeo Tonelli	0	2	0	0
12	(Canada) Crispin Duenas	2	0	2	2

3rd round
5	(Italy) Mauro Nespoli	0	2	0	0
28	(Ukraine) Markiyan Ivashko	2	0	2	2
21	(Japan) Takaharu Furukawa	0	2	0	1	0
12	(Canada) Crispin Duenas	2	0	2	1	2

4th round
28	(Ukraine) Markiyan Ivashko	2	0	2	1	0^{0}
12	(Canada) Crispin Duenas	0	2	0	1	2^{1}

==== Section 4 ====
1st round
13	(Netherlands) Rick van der Ven	2	2	2
100	(Ivory Coast) Philippe Kouassi	0	0	0
61	(Moldova) Dan Olaru	0	1	2	2	0^{0}
52	(Poland) Slawomir Naploszek	2	1	0	0	2^{1}
45	(United Kingdom) Alan Wills	0	2	0	0
68	(Chile) Guillermo Aguilar Gimpel	2	0	2	2
93	(Finland) Samuli Piippo	2	2	0	0	1^{0}
20	(Mongolia) Jantsangiin Gantögs	0	0	2	2	1^{1}
29	(United States) Jake Kaminski	2	1	2	0	0^{1}
84	(Norway) Christoffer Furnes	0	1	0	2	2^{0}
77	(United Kingdom) Ashe Morgan	2	2	1	0	0^{0}
36	(North Korea) Jon Chol	0	0	1	2	2^{1}
4	(France) Jean-Charles Valladont
Bye

2nd round
13	(Netherlands) Rick van der Ven	2	2	2
52	(Poland) Slawomir Naploszek	0	0	0
68	(Chile) Guillermo Aguilar Gimpel	0	1	0	2	1
20	(Mongolia) Jantsangiin Gantögs	2	1	2	0	1
29	(United States) Jake Kaminski	2	1	2	2
36	(North Korea) Jon Chol	0	1	0	0
4	(France) Jean-Charles Valladont
Bye

3rd round
13	(Netherlands) Rick van der Ven	2	1	2	1
20	(Mongolia) Jantsangiin Gantögs	0	1	0	1
29	(United States) Jake Kaminski	0	2	0	2	0
4	(France) Jean-Charles Valladont	2	0	2	0	2

4th round
13	(Netherlands) Rick van der Ven	0	1	0	0
4	(France) Jean-Charles Valladont	2	1	2	2

=== Bottom half ===
==== Section 5 ====
1st round
3	(South Korea) Im Dong-hyun
Bye
35	(Japan) Shohei Ota	0	1	0	2	2^{1}
78	(Russia) Bair Tsybekdorzhiev	2	1	2	0	0^{0}
83	(Ukraine) Yaroslav Mokrynsky	0	2	0	0
30	(Mexico) Juan René Serrano	2	0	2	2
19	(Malaysia) Khairul Anuar Mohamad	2	2	0	2
94	(Estonia) Pearu Jakob Ojamae	0	0	2	0
67	(Thailand) Denchai Thepna	0	1	0	0
46	(Malaysia) Haziq Kamaruddin	2	1	2	2
51	(Belarus) Mikalai Marusau	2	2	0	2
62	(Netherlands) Rick van den Oever	0	0	2	0
99	(Hungary) Arpad Banda	0	0	2	2	0
14	(Spain) Juan Ignacio Rodríguez	2	2	0	0	2

2nd round
3	(South Korea) Im Dong-hyun
Bye
35	(Japan) Shohei Ota	0	0	0
30	(Mexico) Juan René Serrano	2	2	2
19	(Malaysia) Khairul Anuar Mohamad	2	0	2	0	2
46	(Malaysia) Haziq Kamaruddin	0	2	0	2	0
51	(Belarus) Mikalai Marusau	0	0	2	2	0
14	(Spain) Juan Ignacio Rodríguez	2	2	0	0	2

3rd round
3	(South Korea) Im Dong-hyun	0	2	2	2
30	(Mexico) Juan René Serrano	2	0	0	0
19	(Malaysia) Khairul Anuar Mohamad	2	2	0	0	2
14	(Spain) Juan Ignacio Rodríguez	0	0	2	2	0

4th round
3	(South Korea) Im Dong-hyun	2	2	2
19	(Malaysia) Khairul Anuar Mohamad	0	0	0

==== Section 6 ====
1st round
11	(Russia) Alexey Nikolaev	0	2	1	2	2
102	(Dominican Republic) Andres Alfonseca	2	0	1	0	0
59	(Israel) Guy Matzkin	0	2	2	0	0
54	(Germany) Simon Nesemann	2	0	0	2	2
43	(Colombia) Daniel Pacheco	2	0	0	2	2
70	(Netherlands) Johan Weiss	0	2	2	0	0
91	(Kazakhstan) Oibek Saidiyev	0	1	0	1
22	(India) Kapil	2	1	2	1
27	(Norway) Bård Nesteng	0	2	0	0
86	(Turkey) Fatih Bozlar	2	0	2	2
75	(Sweden) Sebastian Djerf	2	0	2	2
38	(Mongolia) Gombodorj Gan-Erdene	0	2	0	0
6	(China) Dai Xiaoxiang
Bye

2nd round
11	(Russia) Alexey Nikolaev	0	2	2	0	0
54	(Germany) Simon Nesemann	2	0	0	2	2
43	(Colombia) Daniel Pacheco	2	1	0	2	0^{0}
22	(India) Kapil	0	1	2	0	2^{1}
86	(Turkey) Fatih Bozlar	2	2	0	2
75	(Sweden) Sebastian Djerf	0	0	2	0
6	(China) Dai Xiaoxiang
Bye

3rd round
54	(Germany) Simon Nesemann	1	0	2	0	1
22	(India) Kapil	1	2	0	2	1
86	(Turkey) Fatih Bozlar	0	0	0
6	(China) Dai Xiaoxiang	2	2	2

4th round
22	(India) Kapil	0	0	0
6	(China) Dai Xiaoxiang	2	2	2

==== Section 7 ====
1st round
7	(France) Gaël Prévost
Bye
39	(Australia) Ryan Tyack	0	0	2	2	2
74	(Romania) Daniel Ciornei	2	2	0	0	0
87	(Canada) Hugh MacDonald	0	0	1	2	0
26	(Canada) Jason Lyon	2	2	1	0	2
23	(United Kingdom) Laurence Godfrey	2	0	0	2	0
90	(Mongolia) Baasanjav Dolgorsuren	0	2	2	0	2
71	(United States) Joe Fanchin	1	0	2	2	2
42	(Turkey) Cevdet Demiral	1	2	0	0	0
55	(Hong Kong) Chui Chun Man	2	0	0	2	0
58	(Republic of Ireland) Keith Hanlon	0	2	2	0	2
103	(Sri Lanka) Lakmal Chaminda Rajasinghe	0	2	0	0
10	(Netherlands) Sjef van den Berg	2	0	2	2

2nd round
7	(France) Gaël Prévost
Bye
39	(Australia) Ryan Tyack	0	2	0	2	1^{0}
26	(Canada) Jason Lyon	2	0	2	0	1^{1}
90	(Mongolia) Baasanjav Dolgorsuren	0	0	2	0
71	(United States) Joe Fanchin	2	2	0	2
58	(Republic of Ireland) Keith Hanlon	2	2	0	0	0
10	(Netherlands) Sjef van den Berg	0	0	2	2	2

3rd round
7	(France) Gaël Prévost	0	1	0	2	0
26	(Canada) Jason Lyon	2	1	2	0	2
71	(United States) Joe Fanchin	2	2	2
10	(Netherlands) Sjef van den Berg	0	0	0

4th round
26	(Canada) Jason Lyon	2	0	0	2	2
71	(United States) Joe Fanchin	0	2	2	0	0

==== Section 8 ====
1st round
15	(India) Jayanta Talukdar	2	2	2
98	(Kazakhstan) Artyom Gankin	0	0	0
63	(Finland) Antti Tekoniemi	1	0	1	1	0
50	(France) Thomas Faucheron	1	2	1	1	2
47	(Luxembourg) Jeff Henckels	1	0	2	2	0^{0}
66	(Thailand) Witthaya Thamwong	1	2	0	0	2^{1}
95	(Germany) Christian Weiss	1	0	1	0
18	(Mexico) Luis Álvarez	1	2	1	2
31	(Ukraine) Viktor Ruban	0	2	2	1	0^{1}
82	(Turkey) Kerem Kirsever	2	0	0	1	2^{0}
79	(Chinese Taipei) Chu Shu-yu	0	1	2	1	0
34	(Australia) Matthew Gray	2	1	0	1	2
2	(South Korea) Lee Seung-yun
Bye

2nd round
15	(India) Jayanta Talukdar	0	0	2	2	2
50	(France) Thomas Faucheron	2	2	0	0	0
66	(Thailand) Witthaya Thamwong	1	0	0	0
18	(Mexico) Luis Álvarez	1	2	2	2
31	(Ukraine) Viktor Ruban	2	0	2	0	2
34	(Australia) Matthew Gray	0	2	0	2	0
2	(South Korea) Lee Seung-yun
Bye

3rd round
15	(India) Jayanta Talukdar	2	0	0	0
18	(Mexico) Luis Álvarez	0	2	2	2
31	(Ukraine) Viktor Ruban	0	1	0	2	0
2	(South Korea) Lee Seung-yun	2	1	2	0	2

4th round
18	(Mexico) Luis Álvarez	0	0	2	0
2	(South Korea) Lee Seung-yun	2	2	0	2

== Finals ==
Quarterfinals
1	(South Korea) Oh Jin-hyek	2	0	2	1	2
8	(Australia) Taylor Worth	0	2	0	1	0
12	(Canada) Crispin Duenas	2	0	0	1	2^{1}
4	(France) Jean-Charles Valladont	0	2	2	1	0^{0}
3	(South Korea) Im Dong-hyun	2	0	2	0	0
6	(China) Dai Xiaoxiang	0	2	0	2	2
26	(Canada) Jason Lyon	1	0	0	0
2	(South Korea) Lee Seung-yun	1	2	2	2

Semifinals
1	(South Korea) Oh Jin-hyek	0	2	2	2
12	(Canada) Crispin Duenas	2	0	0	0
6	(China) Dai Xiaoxiang	2	0	0	0
2	(South Korea) Lee Seung-yun	0	2	2	2

Finals
1	(South Korea) Oh Jin-hyek	1	0	0	2	0
2	(South Korea) Lee Seung-yun	1	2	2	0	2
Third place
12	(Canada) Crispin Duenas	2	2	2
6	(China) Dai Xiaoxiang	0	0	0
