= 2013 World Archery Championships – Men's team recurve =

2013 World Archery Championships
Men	Recurve	Compound
Women	Recurve	Compound
Team	Men's recurve	Men's compound
Team	Women's recurve	Women's compound
Mixed team	Recurve	Compound

The men's team recurve competition at the 2013 World Archery Championships took place on 29 September – 6 October 2013 in Belek, Turkey.

37 countries entered the full quota of 3 archers into the qualification round, thus becoming eligible for the team competition. The combined totals of the 3 archers from each country in the qualification round were added together, and the 16 teams with the highest combined scores competed in the elimination rounds.

== Schedule ==
All times are local (UTC+02:00).

Date	Time	Phase
29 September	14:00	Official practice
1 October	09:00	Qualification
3 October	14:30	1/8, QF, and SF Eliminations
6 October	11:00	Medal matches

== Qualification round ==
Pre-tournament world rankings ('WR') are taken from the 28 August 2013 World Archery Rankings.

Qualified for eliminations

Rank	Nation	Name	Score	WR
1	South Korea	Oh Jin-hyek; Lee Seung-yun; Im Dong-hyun	4057	1
2	India	Jayanta Talukdar; Tarundeep Rai; Kapil	3983	9
3	France	Jean-Charles Valladont; Gaël Prévost; Thomas Faucheron	3967	6
4	Mexico	Luis Álvarez; Eduardo Vélez; Juan René Serrano	3957	3
5	Netherlands	Sjef van den Berg; Rick van der Ven; Rick van den Oever	3952	11
6	China	Dai Xiaoxiang; Xing Yu; Zhang Jianping	3949	5
7	Australia	Taylor Worth; Matthew Gray; Ryan Tyack	3940	19
8	Japan	Takaharu Furukawa; Shotei Ota; Shungo Tabata	3926	8
9	Russia	Alexey Nikolaev; Bolot Tsybzhitov; Bair Tsybekdorzhiev	3925	15
10	United States	Brady Ellison; Jake Kaminski; Joe Fanchin	3924	2
11	Italy	Mauro Nespoli; Michele Frangilli; Amadeo Tonelli	3921^{180;66}	4
12	Malaysia	Khairul Anuar Mohamad; Atiq Bazil Bakri; Haziq Kamaruddin	3921^{161;52}	7
13	Canada	Crispin Duenas; Jay Lyon; Hugh MacDonald	3914	17
14	Spain	Juan Ignacio Rodríguez; Elias Cuesta; Antonio Fernández	3907	14
15	Ukraine	Markiyan Ivashko; Viktor Ruban; Yaroslav Mokrynsky	3891	10
16	United Kingdom	Larry Godfrey; Alan Wills; Ashe Morgan	3887	12
17	Mongolia	Jantsangiin Gantögs; Gombodorj Gan-Erdene; Baasanjav Dolgorsuren	3880	20
18	Chinese Taipei	Kuo Cheng-wei; Chang Wei-hsiang; Chu Shu-yu	3872	16
19	Poland	Piotr Nowak; Slawomir Naploszek; Rafał Dobrowolski	3857	21
20	Brazil	Marcus Vinicius D'Almeida; Daniel Xavier; Marcos A. Bortoloto	3841	23
21	Thailand	Witthaya Thamwong; Denchai Thepna; Khomkrit Duangsuwan	3837	52
22	Germany	Sebastian Rohrberg; Simon Nesemann; Christian Weiss	3835	18
23	Turkey	Cevdet Demiral; Kerem Kirsever; Fatih Bozlar	3829	13
24	Norway	Bård Nesteng; Christoffer Furnes; Paul Andre Hagen	3821	45
25	Colombia	Daniel Pacheco; Daniel Pineda; Andrés Pila	3807	24
26	Bangladesh	Md Ruhan Shana; Shiek Sojeb; Muhammed Durul Huda	3750	36
27	Finland	Antti Tekoniemi; Samuli Piippo; Pyry Ekholm	3740	26
28	Austria	Alexander Bertschler; Raphael Dutzler; Erwin Rebernig	3728	
29	Kazakhstan	Oibek Saidiyev; Artyom Gankin; Denis Gankin	3699	25
30	Slovakia	Matúš Hanzlík; Martin Horňák; Martin Polakovic	3678	
31	Lithuania	Modestas Šliauteris; Kęstutis Timinskas; Lenardas Bernotas	3670	
32	Estonia	Pearu Jakob Ojamae; Jaanus Gross; Tanel Kaasik	3669	
33	Luxembourg	Jeff Henckels; Stephane Kraus; Luc Schuler	3660	54
34	Argentina	Hugo Eduardo Robles; Fabian Cardenas; Genaro Riccio	3632	27
35	Cyprus	Mimis El Helali; Charalambos Charalambous; Konstantinos Loizou	3556	50
36	Ivory Coast	Philippe Kouassi; Akpa Samuel Bethel Essis; Tanoh Herbert Kouadio	3335	
37	Kosovo	Hazir Asllani; Atdhe Luzhnica; Bardhyl Luzhnica	2961	

== Elimination rounds ==
1st round
1	South Korea	170
16	United Kingdom	168
9	Russia	168
8	Japan	177
5	Netherlands	184
12	Malaysia	169
13	Canada	178
4	Mexico	169
3	France	188
14	Spain	179
11	Italy	178
6	China	170
7	Australia	160
10	United States	169
15	Ukraine	177
2	India	172

Quarterfinals
1	South Korea	192
8	Japan	175
5	Netherlands	182
13	Canada	179
3	France	191
11	Italy	187
10	United States	190
15	Ukraine	183

Semifinals
1	South Korea	191
5	Netherlands	193
3	France	189
10	United States	191

Finals
5	Netherlands	210
10	United States	214
Third place
1	South Korea	227
3	France	228
