= 2013 World Archery Championships – Women's team compound =

2013 World Archery Championships
Men	Recurve	Compound
Women	Recurve	Compound
Team	Men's recurve	Men's compound
Team	Women's recurve	Women's compound
Mixed team	Recurve	Compound

The women's team compound competition at the 2013 World Archery Championships took place on 29 September – 6 October 2013 in Belek, Turkey.

18 countries entered the full quota of 3 archers into the qualification round, thus becoming eligible for the team competition. The combined totals of the 3 archers from each country in the qualification round were added together, and the 16 teams with the highest combined scores competed in the elimination rounds.

The gold medal was won by second seed Colombia.

== Schedule ==
All times are local (UTC+02:00).

Date	Time	Phase
29 September	14:00	Official practice
30 September	14:15	Qualification
4 October	09:30	1/8, QF, and SF Eliminations
5 October	11:00	Medal matches

== Qualification round ==
Pre-tournament world rankings ('WR') are taken from the 28 August 2013 World Archery Rankings.

Qualified for eliminations

Rank	Nation	Name	Score	WR
1	South Korea	Seok Ji-hyun; Choi Bo-min; Seo Jung-hee	2053	4
2	Colombia	Sara López; Alejandra Usquiano; Aura Bravo	2037	2
3	Italy	Marcella Tonioli; Anastasia Anastasio; Katia D'Agostino	2037	3
4	Russia	Albina Loginova; Svetlana Cherkashneva; Natalia Avdeeva	2035	6
5	Germany	Sabine Sauter; Melanie Mikala; Kristina Berger	2029	11
6	United Kingdom	Danielle Brown; Rikki Bingham; Andrea Gales	2019	13
7	United States	Erika Jones; Carli Cochran; Gabrielle Cyr	2018	1
8	Venezuela	Olga Bosch; Ana Mendoza; Luzmary Guedez	2017	5
9	France	Pascale Lebecque; Sophie Dodemont; Sandrine Vandionant	2015	8
10	India	Jyothi Surekha Vennam; Trisha Deb; Jhano Hansdah	2010	9
11	Mexico	Linda Ochoa; Martha Hernández; Brenda Merino	1998	7
12	South Africa	Danelle Wentzel; Gerda Roux; Jeanine van Kradenburg	1988	29
13	Netherlands	Inge van Caspel; Irina Markovic; Martine Couwenberg	1987	14
14	Canada	Fiona McClean; Sonia Schina; Ashley Wallace	1981	22
15	Brazil	Nely Acquesta; Elizabeth Harumi Shimizu; Dirma Miranda dos Santos	1972	31
16	Australia	Karina Marshall; Deb Nicholson; Sherry Gale	1971	12
17	Turkey	Gizem Kocaman; Vildan Şenocak; Duygu Ece Benek	1966	26
18	Kazakhstan	Bibigul Izbassarova; Svetlana Shepotko; Ainur Tyrtykaeva	1876	39

== Elimination rounds ==
1st round
1	South Korea	193
16	Australia	188
9	France	208
8	Venezuela	197
5	Germany	176
12	South Africa	182
13	Netherlands	195
4	Russia	186
3	Italy	173
14	Canada	182
11	Mexico	185
6	United Kingdom	191
7	United States	172
10	India	156
15	Brazil	144
2	Colombia	166

Quarterfinals
1	South Korea	158^{24}
9	France	158^{27}
12	South Africa	172
13	Netherlands	175
14	Canada	169
6	United Kingdom	178
7	United States	175
2	Colombia	191

Semifinals
9	France	177
13	Netherlands	182
6	United Kingdom	165
2	Colombia	194

Finals
13	Netherlands	215
2	Colombia	220
Third place
9	France	219
6	United Kingdom	217
