= 2013 World Archery Championships – Women's individual compound =

2013 World Archery Championships
Men	Recurve	Compound
Women	Recurve	Compound
Team	Men's recurve	Men's compound
Team	Women's recurve	Women's compound
Mixed team	Recurve	Compound

The women's individual compound competition at the 2013 World Archery Championships took place on 29 September – 6 October 2013 in Belek, Turkey.

78 archers from 37 countries entered the competition, with a maximum of three entries per country. All archers qualified for the 7-round knockout tournament, with the top 8 scores in qualifying receiving a bye to the third round. The reigning champion was Albina Loginova of Russia.

== Schedule ==
All times are local (UTC+02:00).

Date	Time	Phase
29 September	14:00	Official practice
30 September	14:15	Qualification
2 October	15:00	1/48 and 1/24 Eliminations
3 October	09:30	1/16, 1/8, QF, and SF Eliminations
5 October	15:45	Medal matches

== Qualification round ==
Pre-tournament world rankings ('WR') are taken from the 28 August 2013 World Archery Rankings. The qualification round consisted of two sessions of 36 arrows, with equal scores separated by number of 10s, then number of X's and world ranking, expect in the case of 7-9th place which was resolved by shoot-off. With fewer than 104 entrants, all archers qualified for the elimination rounds with those ranked 9th-34th effectively receiving byes to the 2nd round.

Bye to third round
Qualified for eliminations

Rank	Name	Nation	Score	WR
1	Albina Loginova	Russia	692	2
2	Seok Ji-hyun	South Korea	690	4
3	Sara López	Colombia	687	3
4	Svetlana Cherkashneva	Russia	687	41
5	Alejandra Usquiano	Colombia	687	6
6	Jyothi Surekha Vennam	India	685	36
7	Choi Bo-min	South Korea	684	16
8	Erika Jones	United States	684	1
9	Camilla Sømod	Denmark	684	8
10	Danielle Brown	United Kingdom	683	30
11	Toja Cerna	Slovenia	683	145
12	Marcella Tonioli	Italy	682	9
13	Linda Ochoa	Mexico	682	11
14	Fatin Nurfatehah Mat Sellah	Malaysia	681	78
15	Trisha Deb	India	680	84
16	Maja Orlić	Croatia	679	72
17	Seo Jung-hee	South Korea	679	32
18	Pascale Lebecque	France	679	7
19	Runa Grydeland	Norway	678	88
20	Anastasia Anastasio	Italy	678	10
21	Sabine Sauter	Germany	678	
22	Melanie Mikala	Germany	677	39
23	Carli Cochran	United States	677	21
24	Katia D'Agostino	Italy	677	40
25	Rikki Bingham	United Kingdom	676	75
26	Olga Bosch	Venezuela	676	26
27	Sophie Dodemont	France	675	24
28	Kiyomi Hayashi	Japan	674	
29	Kristina Berger	Germany	674	5
30	Melanie Lawther	Ireland	674	62
31	Danelle Wentzel	South Africa	673	85
32	Karina Marshall	Australia	673	53
33	Martha Hernández	Mexico	672	151
34	Ana Mendoza	Venezuela	671	13
35	Luzmary Guedez	Venezuela	670	58
36	Isabell Danielsson	Sweden	670	56
37	Inge van Caspel	Netherlands	669	19
38	Ingrid Olofsson	Sweden	670	187
39	Ivana Buden	Croatia	668	14
40	Fiona McClean	Canada	668	
41	Shabnam Sarlak	Iran	668	231
42	Gizem Kocaman	Turkey	666	
43	Aura Bravo	Colombia	663	93
44	Nely Acquesta	Brazil	663	101
45	Deb Nicholson	Australia	662	89
46	Irina Markovic	Netherlands	663	45
47	Sonia Schina	Canada	662	
48	Sandrine Vandionant	France	661	28
49	Elizabeth Harumi Shimizu	Brazil	660	111
50	Katarzyna Szalanska	Poland	660	74
51	Andrea Marcos	Spain	660	
52	Vanina Backis	Argentina	660	42
53	Andrea Gales	United Kingdom	660	44
54	Gerda Roux	South Africa	659	92
55	Anna Stanieczek	Poland	659	76
56	Inga Kizeliauskaitė	Lithuania	658	
57	Barbara Scott	New Zealand	658	61
58	Gabrielle Cyr	United States	657	164
59	Natalia Avdeeva	Russia	656	47
60	Jeanine van Kradenburg	South Africa	656	106
61	Vildan Şenocak	Turkey	655	
62	Martine Couwenberg	Netherlands	655	137
63	Anne Lantee	Finland	654	184
64	Gladys Willems	Belgium	652	67
65	Ashley Wallace	Canada	651	27
66	Dirma Miranda dos Santos	Brazil	649	217
67	Jelena Babinina	Lithuania	649	131
68	Fatimah Almashhadani	Iraq	646	134
69	Jhano Hansdah	India	645	94
70	Duygu Ece Benek	Turkey	645	
71	Brenda Merino	Mexico	644	68
72	Katarina Durna	Slovakia	643	243
73	Sherry Gale	Australia	636	289
74	Bibigul Izbassarova	Kazakhstan	634	160
75	June Svensen	Norway	632	
76	Svetlana Shepotko	Kazakhstan	630	162
77	Ainur Tyrtykaeva	Kazakhstan	612	261
78	Ayasha Parvin Mohua	Bangladesh	599	

== Elimination rounds ==
=== Top half ===
==== Section 1 ====
1st round
1	(Russia) Albina Loginova
Bye
33	(Mexico) Martha Hernández
Bye
32	(Australia) Katrina Marshall
Bye
17	(South Korea) Seo Jung-hee
Bye
65	(Canada) Ashley Wallace	138
48	(France) Sandrine Vandionant	137
49	(Brazil) Elizabeth Harumi Shimizu	135
64	(Belgium) Gladys Willems	142
16	(Croatia) Maja Orlić
Bye

2nd round
1	(Russia) Albina Loginova
Bye
33	(Mexico) Martha Hernández	139
32	(Australia) Katrina Marshall	146
17	(South Korea) Seo Jung-hee	145
65	(Canada) Ashley Wallace	140
64	(Belgium) Gladys Willems	139
16	(Croatia) Maja Orlić	147

3rd round
1	(Russia) Albina Loginova	127
32	(Australia) Katrina Marshall	117
17	(South Korea) Seo Jung-hee	115
16	(Croatia) Maja Orlić	128

4th round
1	(Russia) Albina Loginova	116
16	(Croatia) M Orlić	126

==== Section 2 ====
1st round
9	(Denmark) Camilla Sømod
Bye
57	(New Zealand) Barbara Scott	143
56	(Lithuania) Inga Kizeliauskaitė	136
41	(Iran) Shabnam Sarlak	145
72	(Slovakia) Katarina Durna	131
24	(Italy) Katia D'Agostino
Bye
25	(United Kingdom) Rikki Bingham
Bye
73	(Australia) Sherry Gale	136
40	(Canada) Fiona McClean	137
8	(United States) Erika Jones
Bye

2nd round
9	(Denmark) Camilla Sømod	147
57	(New Zealand) Barbara Scott	141
41	(Iran) Shabnam Sarlak	139
24	(Italy) Katia D'Agostino	145
25	(United Kingdom) Rikki Bingham	140
40	(Canada) Fiona McClean	136
8	(United States) Erika Jones
Bye

3rd round
9	(Denmark) Camilla Sømod	136
24	(Italy) Katia D'Agostino	125
25	(United Kingdom) Rikki Bingham	130
8	(United States) Erika Jones	120

4th round
9	(Denmark) Camilla Sømod	115
25	(United Kingdom) Rikki Bingham	128

==== Section 3 ====
1st round
5	(Colombia) Alejandra Usquiano
Bye
37	(Netherlands) Inge van Caspel	145
76	(Kazakhstan) Svetlana Shepotko	135
28	(Japan) Kiyomi Hayashi
Bye
21	(Germany) Sabine Sauter
Bye
69	(India) Jhano Hansdah	136
44	(Brazil) Nely Acquesta	143
53	(United Kingdom) Andrea Gales	143
60	(South Africa) Jeanine van Kradenburg	142
12	(Italy) Marcella Tonioli
Bye

2nd round
5	(Colombia) Alejandra Usquiano
Bye
37	(Netherlands) Inge van Caspel	143
28	(Japan) Kiyomi Hayashi	142
21	(Germany) Sabine Sauter	148
44	(Brazil) Nely Acquesta	137
53	(United Kingdom) Andrea Gales	139
12	(Italy) Marcella Tonioli	144

3rd round
5	(Colombia) Alejandra Usquiano	129
37	(Netherlands) Inge van Caspel	133
21	(Germany) Sabine Sauter	99
12	(Italy) Marcella Tonioli	126

4th round
37	(Netherlands) Inge van Caspel	109
12	(Italy) Marcella Tonioli	124

==== Section 4 ====
1st round
13	(Mexico) Linda Ochoa
Bye
61	(Turkey) Vildan Şenocak	137
52	(Argentina) Vanina Backis	135
45	(Australia) Deb Nicholson	139
68	(Iraq) Fatimah Almashhadani	143
20	(Italy) Anastasia Anastasio
Bye
29	(Germany) Kristina Berger
Bye
77	(Kazakhstan) Ainur Tyrtykaeva
36	(Sweden) Isabell Danielsson	137
4	(Russia) Svetlana Cherkashneva
Bye

2nd round
13	(Mexico) Linda Ochoa	146
61	(Turkey) Vildan Şenocak	136
68	(Iraq) Fatimah Almashhadani	145
20	(Italy) Anastasia Anastasio	142
29	(Germany) Kristina Berger	146
36	(Sweden) Isabell Danielsson	139
4	(Russia) Svetlana Cherkashneva
Bye

3rd round
13	(Mexico) Linda Ochoa	134
68	(Iraq) Fatimah Almashhadani	124
29	(Germany) Kristina Berger	139^{9}
4	(Russia) Svetlana Cherkashneva	139^{8}

4th round
13	(Mexico) Linda Ochoa	113
29	(Germany) Kristina Berger	126

=== Bottom half ===
==== Section 5 ====
1st round
3	(Colombia) Sara López
Bye
35	(Venezuela) Luzmary Guedez	145
78	(Bangladesh) Ayasha Parvin Mohua	116
30	(Republic of Ireland) Melanie Lawther
Bye
19	(Norway) Runa Grydeland
Bye
67	(Lithuania) Jelena Babinina	135
46	(Netherlands) Irina Markovic	134
51	(Spain) Andrea Marcos	143
62	(Netherlands) Martine Couwenberg	134
14	(Malaysia) Fatin Nurfatehah Mat Sellah
Bye

2nd round
3	(Colombia) Sara López
Bye
35	(Venezuela) Luzmary Guedez	142
30	(Republic of Ireland) Melanie Lawther	143
19	(Norway) Runa Grydeland	144
67	(Lithuania) Jelena Babinina	137
51	(Spain) Andrea Marcos	139
14	(Malaysia) Fatin Nurfatehah Mat Sellah	147

3rd round
3	(Colombia) Sara López	125
30	(Republic of Ireland) Melanie Lawther	128
19	(Norway) Runa Grydeland	124
14	(Malaysia) Fatin Nurfatehah Mat Sellah	119

4th round
30	(Republic of Ireland) Melanie Lawther	127
19	(Norway) Runa Grydeland	119

==== Section 6 ====
1st round
11	(Slovenia) Toja Cerne
Bye
59	(Russia) Natalia Avdeeva	131
54	(South Africa) Gerda Roux	138
43	(Colombia) Aura Bravo	143
70	(Turkey) Duygu Ece Benek	132
22	(Germany) Melanie Mikala
Bye
27	(France) Sophie Dodemont
Bye
75	(Norway) June Svensen	128
38	(Sweden) Ingrid Olofsson	144
6	(India) Jyothi Surekha Vennam
Bye

2nd round
11	(Slovenia) Toja Cerne	140^{10}
54	(South Africa) Gerda Roux	140^{10*}
43	(Colombia) Aura Bravo	144
22	(Germany) Melanie Mikala	141
27	(France) Sophie Dodemont	135
38	(Sweden) Ingrid Olofsson	142
6	(India) Jyothi Surekha Vennam
Bye

3rd round
54	(South Africa) Gerda Roux	130
43	(Colombia) Aura Bravo	108
38	(Sweden) Ingrid Olofsson	105
6	(India) Jyothi Surekha Vennam	136

4th round
54	(South Africa) Gerda Roux	130
6	(India) Jyothi Surekha Vennam	118

==== Section 7 ====
1st round
7	(South Korea) Choi Bo-min
Bye
39	(Croatia) Ivana Buden	142
74	(Kazakhstan) Bibigul Izbassarova	135
26	(Venezuela) Olga Bosch
Bye
23	(United States) Carli Cochran
Bye
71	(Mexico) Brenda Merino	138
42	(Turkey) Gizem Kocaman	134
55	(Poland) Anna Stanieczek	144
58	(United States) Gabrielle Cyr	141
10	(United Kingdom) Danielle Brown
Bye

2nd round
7	(South Korea) Choi Bo-min
Bye
39	(Croatia) Ivana Buden	139
26	(Venezuela) Olga Bosch	137
23	(United States) Carli Cochran	139
71	(Mexico) Brenda Merino	141
55	(Poland) Anna Stanieczek	140
10	(United Kingdom) Danielle Brown	145

3rd round
7	(South Korea) Choi Bo-min	115
39	(Croatia) Ivana Buden	126
71	(Mexico) Brenda Merino	126
10	(United Kingdom) Danielle Brown	119

4th round
39	(Croatia) Ivana Buden	134
71	(Mexico) Brenda Merino	119

==== Section 8 ====
1st round
15	(India) Trisha Deb
Bye
63	(Finland) Anne Lantee	140
50	(Poland) Katarzyna Szalanska	137
47	(Canada) Sonia Schina	134
66	(Brazil) Dirma Miranda dos Santos	131
18	(France) Pascale Lebecque
Bye
31	(South Africa) Danelle Wentzel
Bye
34	(Venezuela) Ana Mendoza
Bye
2	(South Korea) Seok Ji-hyun
Bye

2nd round
15	(India) Trisha Deb	142
63	(Finland) Anne Lantee	144
47	(Canada) Sonia Schina	140
18	(France) Pascale Lebecque	144
31	(South Africa) Danelle Wentzel	140
34	(Venezuela) Ana Mendoza	139
2	(South Korea) Seok Ji-hyun
Bye

3rd round
63	(Finland) Anne Lantee	112
18	(France) Pascale Lebecque	121
31	(South Africa) Danelle Wentzel	139
2	(South Korea) Seok Ji-hyun	108

4th round
18	(France) Pascale Lebecque	123
31	(South Africa) Danelle Wentzel	132

== Finals ==
Quarterfinals
16	(Croatia) Maja Orlić	110
25	(United Kingdom) Rikki Bingham	108
12	(Italy) Marcella Tonioli	111
29	(Germany) Kristina Berger	119
30	(Republic of Ireland) Melanie Lawther	106
54	(South Africa) Gerda Roux	118
39	(Croatia) Ivana Buden	136
31	(South Africa) Danelle Wentzel	109

Semifinals
16	(Croatia) Maja Orlić	105
29	(Germany) Kristina Berger	107
54	(South Africa) Gerda Roux	79
39	(Croatia) Ivana Buden	88

Finals
29	(Germany) Kristina Berger	144
39	(Croatia) Ivana Buden	137
Third place
16	(Croatia) Maja Orlić	133
54	(South Africa) Gerda Roux	137
