= 2013 World Archery Championships – Women's team recurve =

The women's team recurve competition at the 2013 World Archery Championships took place on 29 September – 6 October 2013 in Belek, Turkey.

32 countries entered the full quota of 3 archers into the qualification round, thus becoming eligible for the team competition. The combined totals of the 3 archers from each country in the qualification round were added together, and the 16 teams with the highest combined scores competed in the elimination rounds.

== Schedule ==
All times are local (UTC+02:00).

Date	Time	Phase
29 September	14:00	Official practice
30 September	09:30	Qualification
3 October	14:30	1/8, QF, and SF Eliminations
6 October	11:00	Medal matches

== Qualification round ==
Pre-tournament world rankings ('WR') are taken from the 28 August 2013 World Archery Rankings.

Qualified for eliminations

Rank	Nation	Name	Score	WR
1	South Korea	Ki Bo-bae; Chang Hye-jin; Yun Ok-hee	4106	1
2	Chinese Taipei	Tan Ya-ting; Le Chien-ying; Wu Chia-hung	4064	5
3	Germany	Elena Richter; Karina Winter; Lisa Unruh	4030	9
4	Mexico	Aída Román; Mariana Avitia; Alejandra Valencia	4018	12
5	Japan	Ayano Kato; Kaori Kawanaka; Yuki Hayashi	3995	6
6	Russia	Inna Stepanova; Natalia Erdyniyeva; Kristina Timofeeva	3987	7
7	Denmark	Maja Jager; Carina Christiansen; Anne Marie Laursen	3981	11
8	China	Xu Jing; Cheng Ming; Cui Yuanyuan	3977	4
9	Ukraine	Lidiia Sichenikova; Anastasia Pavlova; Victoriya Koval	3976	3
10	United States	Khatuna Lorig; Miranda Leek; Jennifer Hardy	3960	10
11	United Kingdom	Naomi Folkard; Rebecca Martin; Amy Oliver	3937	16
12	India	Deepika Kumari; Dola Banerjee; Chekrovolu Swuro	3928	2
13	Georgia	Khatuna Narimanidze; Yulia Lobzhenidze; Kristine Esebua	3921	15
14	Belarus	Hanna Marusava; Alena Tolkach; Ekaterina Timofeyeva	3917	17
15	Colombia	Ana Rendón; Natalia Sánchez; Maira Sepúlveda	3910	24
16	Poland	Karina Lipiarska; Wioleta Myszor; Natalia Leśniak	3904	14
17	France	Noemie Brianne; Cyrielle Cotry; Agnes Meri	3902	13
18	Italy	Natalia Valeeva; Guendalina Sartori; Claudia Mandia	3900	8
19	Brazil	Sarah Nikitin; Ane Marcelle Gomes dos Santos; Marina Canetti Gobbi	3859	28
20	Turkey	Aybüke Aktuna; Begünhan Elif Ünsal; Begül Löklüoğlu	3851	20
21	Mongolia	Bishindeegiin Urantungalag; Enkhtuya Altangerel; Ariunbileg Nyamjargal	3847	21
22	Spain	Magali Foulon; Mirene Etxeberria; Adriana Martín	3845	18
23	Venezuela	Leidys Brito; Mayra Méndez; Genesis Bolivar	3842	10
24	North Korea	Ryu Un-hyang; Kang Un-ju; Choe Song-hui	3825	36
25	Kazakhstan	Farida Tukebaeva; Luyiza Saidiyeva; Yelena Li	3801	25
26	Australia	Deonne Bridger; Alice Ingley; Elisa Barnard	3794	23
27	Canada	Georcy-Stephanie Thiffeault Picard; Virginie Chénier; Vanessa Lee	3774	38
28	Estonia	Reena Pärnat; Laura Nurmsalu; Siret Luik	3767	n/a
29	Czech Republic	Zuzana Paniková; Gabriela Sudrichová; Miroslava Kulhavá	3757	52
30	Sweden	Christine Bjerendal; Jenny Jeppsson; Erika Jangnas	3750	44
31	Switzerland	Celine Schobinger; Nathalie Dielen; Iliana Deineko	3685	26
32	Bhutan	Sherab Zam; Karma; Younten Zangmo	3647	46

== Elimination rounds ==
1st round
1	South Korea	193
16	Poland	189
9	Ukraine	180
8	China	184
5	Japan	161
12	India	165
13	Georgia	154
4	Mexico	168
3	Germany	166
14	Belarus	175
11	United Kingdom	181
6	Russia	171
7	Denmark	188
10	United States	169
15	Colombia	155
2	Chinese Taipei	174

Quarterfinals
1	South Korea	193^{26}
8	China	193^{22}
12	India	176
4	Mexico	195
14	Belarus	180
11	United Kingdom	172
7	Denmark	191
2	Chinese Taipei	185

Semifinals
1	South Korea	181
4	Mexico	177
14	Belarus	170
7	Denmark	166

Finals
1	South Korea	212
14	Belarus	206
Third place
4	Mexico	212
7	Denmark	216
