= 2013 World Archery Championships – Women's individual recurve =

The women's individual recurve competition at the 2013 World Archery Championships took place on 29 September – 6 October 2013 in Belek, Turkey.

115 archers from 49 countries entered the competition, with a maximum of three entries per country. The top 104 archers qualified for the knockout tournament, with the top 8 scores in qualifying receiving a bye to the third round. The reigning champion, Denisse van Lamoen of Chile, did not defend her title as she was momentarily retired from the international scene.

== Schedule ==
All times are local (UTC+02:00).

Date	Time	Phase
29 September	14:00	Official practice
30 September	09:30	Qualification
2 October	11:15	1/48 and 1/24 Eliminations
3 October	09:30	1/16, 1/8, QF, and SF Eliminations
6 October	16:20	Medal matches

== Qualification round ==
Pre-tournament world rankings ('WR') are taken from the 28 August 2013 World Archery Rankings. Qualification consisted of 4 rounds of 36 arrows, at 70m, 60m, 50m, and 30m.

Bye to third round
Qualified for eliminations

Rank	Name	Nation	Score	WR
1	Ki Bo-bae	South Korea	1376	1
2	Tan Ya-ting	Chinese Taipei	1371	23
3	Chang Hye-jin	South Korea	1369	19
4	Aída Román	Mexico	1368	5
5	Yun Ok-hee	South Korea	1361	2
6	Le Chien-ying	Chinese Taipei	1355	52
7	Inna Stepanova	Russia	1355	4
8	Maja Jager	Denmark	1351	49
9	Elena Richter	Germany	1349	32
10	Deepika Kumari	India	1345	3
11	Karina Winter	Germany	1343	13
12	Leidys Brito	Venezuela	1341	59
13	Naomi Folkard	United Kingdom	1340	28
14	Khatuna Lorig	United States	1340	12
15	Xu Jing	China	1339	21
16	Ana Rendón	Colombia	1339	20
17	Lisa Unruh	Germany	1338	31
18	Wu Chia-hung	Chinese Taipei	1338	62
19	Ayano Kato	Japan	1337	46
20	Sarah Nikitin	Brazil	1336	75
21	Lidiia Sichenikova	Ukraine	1335	35
22	Kaori Kawanaka	Japan	1335	45
23	Mariana Avitia	Mexico	1334	17
24	Natalia Erdyniyeva	Russia	1331	56
25	Anastasia Pavlova	Ukraine	1324	15
26	Khatuna Narimanidze	Georgia	1324	40
27	Cheng Ming	China	1324	29
28	Magali Foulon	Spain	1323	68
29	Yuki Hayashi	Japan	1323	83
30	Carina Christiansen	Denmark	1320	18
31	Hanna Marusava	Belarus	1319	233
32	Natalia Valeeva	Italy	1319	24
33	Karina Lipiarska	Poland	1318	41
34	Victoriya Koval	Ukraine	1317	91
35	Guendalina Sartori	Italy	1317	61
36	Alejandra Valencia	Mexico	1316	11
37	Cui Yuanyuan	China	1314	9
38	Miranda Leek	United States	1313	10
39	Yulia Lobzhenidze	Georgia	1310	181
40	Anne Marie Laursen	Denmark	1310	138
41	Celine Schobinger	Switzerland	1308	245
42	Bishindeegiin Urantungalag	Mongolia	1308	34
43	Rebecca Martin	United Kingdom	1308	208
44	Jennifer Hardy	United States	1307	37
45	Noemie Brianne	France	1307	114
46	Alena Tolkach	Belarus	1306	n/a
47	Enkhtuya Altangerel	Mongolia	1304	93
48	Kristina Timofeeva	Russia	1301	22
49	Dola Banerjee	India	1300	77
50	Christine Bjerendal	Sweden	1300	73
51	Cyrielle Cotry	France	1298	38
52	Deonne Bridger	Australia	1298	286
53	Alexandra Mîrca	Moldova	1298	249
54	Agnes Meri	France	1297	176
55	Wioleta Myszor	Poland	1296	116
56	Sinead Cuthbert	Ireland	1295	426
57	Mirene Etxeberria	Spain	1295	n/a
58	Natalia Sánchez	Colombia	1293	53
59	Ane Marcelle Gomes dos Santos	Brazil	1292	189
60	Ekaterina Timofeyeva	Belarus	1292	43
61	Reena Pärnat	Estonia	1292	87
62	Farida Tukebaeva	Kazakhstan	1291	149
63	Natalia Leśniak	Poland	1290	39
64	Elena Mousikou	Cyprus	1290	154
65	Aybüke Aktuna	Turkey	1289	260
66	Amy Oliver	United Kingdom	1289	48
67	Lya Solano	Dominican Republic	1288	67
68	Kristine Esebua	Georgia	1287	27
69	Begünhan Elif Ünsal	Turkey	1286	139
70	Ryu Un-hyang	North Korea	1285	239
71	Chekrovolu Swuro	India	1283	82
72	Shireen-Zoe de Vries	Netherlands	1278	n/a
73	Maira Sepúlveda	Colombia	1278	304
74	Simona Băncilă	Romania	1278	328
75	Georcy-Stephanie Thiffeault Picard	Canada	1278	n/a
76	Begül Löklüoğlu	Turkey	1276	66
77	Kang Un-ju	North Korea	1272	81
78	Choe Song-hui	North Korea	1268	n/a
79	Claudia Mandia	Italy	1264	42
80	Luyiza Saidiyeva	Kazakhstan	1262	300
81	Mayra Méndez	Venezuela	1262	160
82	Zuzana Paniková	Czech Republic	1260	428
83	Gabriela Sudrichová	Czech Republic	1260	329
84	Alice Ingley	Australia	1259	88
85	Melika Abdolkarimi	Iran	1258	n/a
86	Sophia Moraga	Chile	1255	78
87	Virginie Chénier	Canada	1251	289
88	Yelena Li	Kazakhstan	1248	168
89	Vanessa Lee	Canada	1245	145
90	Luminita Boros	Romania	1243	146
91	Sherab Zam	Bhutan	1243	n/a
92	Lenka Harcarikova	Slovakia	1240	427
93	Genesis Bolivar	Venezuela	1239	214
94	Maria Gabriela Goni	Argentina	1239	98
95	Laura Nurmsalu	Estonia	1238	n/a
96	Siret Luik	Estonia	1237	331
97	Miroslava Kulhavá	Czech Republic	1237	n/a
98	Elisa Barnard	Australia	1237	94
99	Ariunbileg Nyamjargal	Mongolia	1235	340
100	Carla Frangilli	Ivory Coast	1234	254
101	Karma	Bhutan	1233	n/a
102	Marina Canetta Gobbi	Brazil	1231	137
103	Anete Kreicberga	Latvia	1228	n/a
104	Adriana Martín	Spain	1227	n/a
105	Nathalie Dielen	Switzerland	1226	140
106	Jenny Jeppsson	Sweden	1225	425
107	Erika Jangnas	Sweden	1225	n/a
108	Anatoli Martha Gkorila	Greece	1215	n/a
109	Nune Vasilyan	Armenia	1209	229
110	Rand Al-Mashhadani	Iraq	1198	462
111	Younten Zangmo	Bhutan	1171	n/a
112	Iliana Deineko	Switzerland	1151	n/a
113	Shamoli Ray	Bangladesh	1147	n/a
114	Firuza Zubaydova	Tajikistan	1123	216
115	Mavzuna Azimova	Tajikistan	1094	n/a

== Elimination rounds ==
=== Top half ===
==== Section 1 ====
1st round
1	(South Korea) Ki Bo-bae
Bye
33	(Poland) Karina Lipiarska	0	0	2	0
80	(Kazakhstan) Luyiza Saidiyeva	2	2	0	2
81	(Venezuela) Mayra Mendez	2	1	0	2	1
32	(Italy) Natalia Valeeva	0	1	2	0	1
17	(Germany) Lisa Unruh	0	1	2	2	2
96	(Estonia) Siret Luik	2	1	0	0	0
65	(Turkey) Aybüke Aktuna	2	0	2	0	0
48	(Russia) Kristina Timofeeva	0	2	0	2	2
49	(India) Dola Banerjee	0	2	2	2
64	(Cyprus) Elena Mousikou	2	0	0	0
97	(Czech Republic) Miroslava Kulhava	0	0	0
16	(Colombia) Ana Rendón	2	2	2

2nd round
1	(South Korea) Ki Bo-bae
Bye
80	(Kazakhstan) Luyiza Saidiyeva	1	0	0	2	0
81	(Venezuela) Mayra Mendez	1	2	2	0	2
17	(Germany) Lisa Unruh	2	2	2
48	(Russia) Kristina Timofeeva	0	0	0
49	(India) Dola Banerjee	2	2	2
16	(Colombia) Ana Rendón	0	0	0

3rd round
1	(South Korea) Ki Bo-bae	2	0	2	2
81	(Venezuela) Mayra Mendez	0	2	0	0
17	(Germany) Lisa Unruh	0	0	0
49	(India) Dola Banerjee	2	2	2

4th round
1	(South Korea) Ki Bo-bae	2	2	2
49	(India) Dola Banerjee	0	0	0

==== Section 2 ====
1st round
9	(Germany) Elena Richter	1	2	2	2
104	(Spain) Adriana Martín	1	0	0	0
57	(Spain) Mirene Etxeberria	2	2	2
56	(Republic of Ireland) Sinead Cuthbert	0	0	0
41	(Switzerland) Celine Schobinger	2	0	2	2
72	(Netherlands) Shireen-Zoe de Vries	0	2	0	0
89	(Canada) Vanessa Lee	0	0	0
24	(Russia) Natalia Erdyniyeva	2	2	2
25	(Ukraine) Anastasia Pavlova	2	2	2
88	(Kazakhstan) Yelena Li	0	0	0
73	(Colombia) Maira Sepúlveda	2	0	2	1	2
40	(Denmark) Anne Marie Laursen	0	2	0	1	0
8	(Denmark) Maja Jager
Bye

2nd round
9	(Germany) Elena Richter	0	2	2	2
57	(Spain) Mirene Etxeberria	2	0	0	0
41	(Switzerland) Celine Schobinger	0	0	0
24	(Russia) Natalia Erdyniyeva	2	2	2
25	(Ukraine) Anastasia Pavlova	2	0	1	0	2^{1}
73	(Colombia) Maira Sepúlveda	0	2	1	2	0^{0}
8	(Denmark) Maja Jager
Bye

3rd round
9	(Germany) Elena Richter	2	0	2	1	0^{0}
24	(Russia) Natalia Erdyniyeva	0	2	0	1	2^{1}
25	(Ukraine) Anastasia Pavlova	0	1	2	1	0
8	(Denmark) Maja Jager	2	1	0	1	2

4th round
24	(Russia) Natalia Erdyniyeva	0	0	1	2	2^{0}
8	(Denmark) Maja Jager	2	2	1	0	0^{1}

==== Section 3 ====
1st round
5	(South Korea) Yun Ok-hee
Bye
37	(China) Cui Yuanyuan	0	2	2	0	2
76	(Turkey) Begül Löklüoğlu	2	0	0	2	0
85	(Iran) Melika Abdolkarimi	1	0	0	0
28	(Spain) Magali Foulon	1	2	2	2
21	(Ukraine) Lidiia Sichenikova	2	2	2
92	(Slovakia) Lenka Harcarikova	0	0	0
69	(Turkey) Begünhan Elif Ünsal	2	2	0	0	2
44	(United States) Jennifer Hardy	0	0	2	2	0
53	(Moldova) Alexandra Mîrca	1	2	2	0	2
60	(Belarus) Ekaterina Timofeyeva	1	0	0	2	0
101	(Bhutan) Karma	0	0	0
12	(Venezuela) Leidys Brito	2	2	2

2nd round
5	(South Korea) Yun Ok-hee
Bye
37	(China) Cui Yuanyuan	2	1	1	0	0
28	(Spain) Magali Foulon	0	1	1	2	2
21	(Ukraine) Lidiia Sichenikova	0	2	1	1	2
69	(Turkey) Begünhan Elif Ünsal	2	0	1	1	0
53	(Moldova) Alexandra Mîrca	2	2	2
12	(Venezuela) Leidys Brito	0	0	0

3rd round
5	(South Korea) Yun Ok-hee	2	0	2	2
28	(Spain) Magali Foulon	0	2	0	0
21	(Ukraine) Lidiia Sichenikova	2	2	0	2
53	(Moldova) Alexandra Mîrca	0	0	2	0

4th round
5	(South Korea) Yun Ok-hee	2	0	2	2
21	(Ukraine) Lidiia Sichenikova	0	2	0	0

==== Section 4 ====
1st round
13	(United Kingdom) Naomi Folkard	1	2	1	0	2
100	(Ivory Coast) Carla Frangilli	1	0	1	2	0
61	(Estonia) Reena Pärnat	0	1	2	0	2^{1}
52	(Australia) Deonne Bridger	2	1	0	2	0^{0}
45	(France) Noemie Brianne	0	1	0	0
68	(Georgia (country)) Kristine Esebua	2	1	2	2
93	(Argentina) Maria Gabriela Goni	0	0	2	2	0
20	(Brazil) Sarah Nikitin	2	2	0	0	2
29	(Japan) Yuki Hayashi	2	2	0	2
84	(Australia) Alice Ingley	0	0	2	0
77	(North Korea) Kang Un-ju	0	0	1	2	0
36	(Mexico) Alejandra Valencia	2	2	1	0	2
4	(Mexico) Aída Román
Bye

2nd round
13	(United Kingdom) Naomi Folkard	1	0	2	1	2
61	(Estonia) Reena Pärnat	1	2	0	1	0
68	(Georgia (country)) Kristine Esebua	1	1	0	2	0
20	(Brazil) Sarah Nikitin	1	1	2	0	2
29	(Japan) Yuki Hayashi	0	0	0
36	(Mexico) Alejandra Valencia	2	2	2
4	(Mexico) Aída Román
Bye

3rd round
13	(United Kingdom) Naomi Folkard	0	0	2	0
20	(Brazil) Sarah Nikitin	2	2	0	2
36	(Mexico) Alejandra Valencia	0	1	0	2	2^{1}
4	(Mexico) Aída Román	2	1	2	0	0^{0}

4th round
20	(Brazil) Sarah Nikitin	0	2	2	0	1^{1}
36	(Mexico) Alejandra Valencia	2	0	0	2	1^{0}

=== Bottom half ===
==== Section 5 ====
1st round
3	(South Korea) Chang Hye-jin
Bye
35	(Italy) Guendalina Sartori	2	0	2	0	2
78	(North Korea) Choe Song-hui	0	2	0	2	0
83	(Czech Republic) Gabriela Sudrichova	0	0	0
30	(Denmark) Carina Christiansen	2	2	2
19	(Japan) Ayana Kato	2	2	1	0	0^{1}
94	(Venezuela) Genesis Bolivar	0	0	1	2	2^{0}
67	(Dominican Republic) Lya Solano	0	1	0	0
46	(Belarus) Alena Tolkach	2	1	2	2
51	(France) Cyrielle Cotry	1	0	0	0
62	(Kazakhstan) Farida Tukebaeva	1	2	2	2
99	(Mongolia) Ariunbileg Nyamjargal	0	0	0
14	(United States)	2	2	2

2nd round
3	(South Korea) Chang Hye-jin
Bye
35	(Italy) Guendalina Sartori	0	0	0
30	(Denmark) Carina Christiansen	2	2	2
19	(Japan) Ayana Kato	2	2	0	0	2
46	(Belarus) Alena Tolkach	0	0	2	2	0
62	(Kazakhstan) Farida Tukebaeva	0	0	1	2	0
14	(United States) Khatuna Lorig	2	2	1	0	2

3rd round
3	(South Korea) Chang Hye-jin	2	2	2
30	(Denmark) Carina Christiansen	0	0	0
19	(Japan) Ayana Kato	0	2	0	1	1
14	(United States) Khatuna Lorig	2	0	2	1	1

4th round
3	(South Korea) Chang Hye-jin	2	2	2
14	(United States) Khatuna Lorig	0	0	0

==== Section 6 ====
1st round
11	(Germany) Karina Winter	2	2	2
102	(Brazil) Marina Canetta Gobbi	0	0	0
59	(Brazil) AM Gomes dos Santos	2	2	0	0	0
54	(France) Agnes Meri	0	0	2	2	2
43	(United Kingdom) Rebecca Martin	1	2	2	0	1
70	(North Korea) Ryu Un-hyang	1	0	0	2	1
91	(Bhutan) Sherab Zam	0	0	0
22	(Japan) Kaori Kawanaka	2	2	2
27	(China) Cheng Ming	2	0	0	2	2
86	(Chile) Sophia Moraga	0	2	2	0	0
75	(Canada) G-S Thiffeault Picard	0	0	0
38	(United States) Miranda Leek	2	2	2
6	(Chinese Taipei) Le Chien-ying
Bye

2nd round
11	(Germany) Karina Winter	2	0	2	2
54	(France) Agnes Meri	0	2	0	0
43	(United Kingdom) Rebecca Martin	2	2	1	0	1
22	(Japan) Kaori Kawanaka	0	0	1	2	1
27	(China) Cheng Ming	0	2	2	0	2
38	(United States) Miranda Leek	2	0	0	2	0
6	(Chinese Taipei) Le Chien-ying
Bye

3rd round
11	(Germany) Karina Winter	0	0	2	1	2^{1}
43	(United Kingdom) Rebecca Martin	2	2	0	1	0^{0}
27	(China) Cheng Ming	0	2	2	0	2
6	(Chinese Taipei) Le Chien-ying	2	0	0	2	0

4th round
11	(Germany) Karina Winter	2	2	0	2
27	(China) Cheng Ming	0	0	2	0

==== Section 7 ====
1st round
7	(Russia) Inna Stepanova
Bye
39	(Georgia (country)) Yulia Lobzhenidze	2	2	1	2
74	(Romania) Simona Băncilă	0	0	1	0
87	(Canada) Virginie Chénier	0	0	2	2	0
26	(Georgia (country)) Khatuna Narimanidze	2	2	0	0	2
23	(Mexico) Mariana Avitia	0	1	2	2	2
90	(Romania) Luminita Boros	2	1	0	0	0
71	(India) Chekrovolu Swuro	0	2	0	2	0
42	(Mongolia) Bishindeegiin Urantungalag	2	0	2	0	2
55	(Poland) Wioleta Myszor	0	2	0	1	2^{1}
58	(Colombia) Natalia Sánchez	2	0	2	1	0^{0}
103	(Latvia) Anete Kreicberga	0	0	0
10	(India) Deepika Kumari	2	2	2

2nd round
7	(Russia) Inna Stepanova
Bye
39	(Georgia (country)) Yulia Lobzhenidze	1	0	2	2	0^{1}
26	(Georgia (country)) Khatuna Narimanidze	1	2	0	0	2^{0}
23	(Mexico) Mariana Avitia	0	2	2	2
42	(Mongolia) Bishindeegiin Urantungalag	2	0	0	0
55	(Poland) Wioleta Myszor	0	2	0	0
10	(India) Deepika Kumari	2	0	2	2

3rd round
7	(Russia) Inna Stepanova	0	2	2	2
39	(Georgia (country)) Yulia Lobzhenidze	2	0	0	0
23	(Mexico) Mariana Avitia	2	1	2	1
10	(India) Deepika Kumari	0	1	0	1

4th round
7	(Russia) Inna Stepanova	0	2	0	2	2
23	(Mexico) Mariana Avitia	2	0	2	0	0

==== Section 8 ====
1st round
15	(China) Xu Jing	2	2	2
98	(Australia) Elisa Barnard	0	0	0
63	(Poland) Natalia Leśniak	1	1	0	1	2^{1}
50	(Sweden) Christine Bjerendal	1	1	2	1	0^{0}
47	(Mongolia) Enkhtuya Altangerel	0	2	0	0
66	(United Kingdom) Amy Oliver	2	0	2	2
95	(Estonia) Laura Nurmsalu	1	0	0	1
18	(Chinese Taipei) Wu Chia-hung	1	2	2	1
31	(Belarus) Hanna Marusava	1	0	2	2	2
82	(Czech Republic) Zuzana Panikova	1	2	0	0	0
79	(Italy) Claudia Mandia	0	2	2	2
34	(Ukraine) Victoriya Koval	2	0	0	0
2	(Chinese Taipei) Tan Ya-ting
Bye

2nd round
15	(China) Xu Jing	1	2	0	1	2
63	(Poland) Natalia Leśniak	1	0	2	1	0
66	(United Kingdom) Amy Oliver	0	2	2	2
18	(Chinese Taipei) Wu Chia-hung	2	0	0	0
31	(Belarus) Hanna Marusava	2	1	0	1	1^{0}
79	(Italy) Claudia Mandia	0	1	2	1	1^{1}
2	(Chinese Taipei) Tan Ya-ting
Bye

3rd round
15	(China) Xu Jing	2	1	2	2
66	(United Kingdom) Amy Oliver	0	1	0	0
79	(Italy) Claudia Mandia	1	0	0	2	0
2	(Chinese Taipei) Tan Ya-ting	1	2	2	0	2

4th round
15	(China) Xu Jing	0	2	0	1	2^{1}
2	(Chinese Taipei) Tan Ya-ting	2	0	2	1	0^{0}

== Finals ==
Quarterfinals
1	(South Korea) Ki Bo-bae	2	0	1	2	0^{0}
8	(Denmark) Maja Jager	0	2	1	0	2^{1}
5	(South Korea) Yun Ok-hee	2	2	2
20	(Brazil) Sarah Nikitin	0	0	0
3	(South Korea) Chang Hye-jin	1	0	0	0
11	(Germany) Karina Winter	1	2	2	2
7	(Russia) Inna Stepanova	0	1	0	2	0
15	(China) Xu Jing	2	1	2	0	2

Semifinals
8	(Denmark) Maja Jager	1	2	0	2	2
5	(South Korea) Yun Ok-hee	1	0	2	0	0
11	(Germany) Karina Winter	2	0	0	0
15	(China) Xu Jing	0	2	2	2

Finals
8	(Denmark) Maja Jager	2	0	2	0	2^{1}
15	(China) Xu Jing	0	2	0	2	0^{0}
Third place
5	(South Korea) Yun Ok-hee	2	2	2
11	(Germany) Karina Winter	0	0	0
