= Maja Jager =

Danish archer (born 1991)

Personal information
- Full name: Maja Buskbjerg Jager
- Nationality: Danish
- Born: 22 December 1991 (age 34) Nørre Broby, Funen, Denmark
- Education: Jungwon University; Technical University of Denmark
- Height: 168 cm (5 ft 6 in)

Sport
- Sport: Archery
- Event: Recurve
Medal record
Women's recurve archery
Representing Denmark
World Championships
Gold medal – first place	2013 Belek	Individual
Bronze medal – third place	2013 Belek	Team
European Championships
Silver medal – second place	2014 Echmiadzin	Mixed team
Silver medal – second place	2018 Legnica	Individual
Bronze medal – third place	2021 Antalya	Women's team
European Games
Silver medal – second place	2015 Baku	Individual
Bronze medal – third place	2019 Minsk	Team
Summer Universiade
Bronze medal – third place	2015 Gwangju	Individual

Maja Buskbjerg Jager (born 22 December 1991) is a Danish recurve archer. A two-time competitor at the Olympic Games (2012 and 2020), Jager was the women's individual champion at the 2013 World Archery Championships, an achievement for which she was awarded the Danish Sports Name of the Year prize for 2013. She is also a multiple medalist at the European Games and the European Archery Championships.

== Early and personal life ==
Jager was born on 22 December 1991 in Nørre Broby to Jan and Hanne Jager. She was introduced to archery at the age of eight, and in her youth practised in a warehouse in Tilst, a venue procured by her father using his local connections as a fruit grower in the Aarhus region. She was later trained by former Danish Olympic archer Ole Gammelgaard.

In 2013 Jager moved to Goesan, South Korea to train under Kim Hyung-Tak, the coach of the Korean archery team at the 1984 Summer Olympics, as part of an agreement between Kim and the Danish Archery Federation. To meet her residency requirements in South Korea she undertook and completed an undergraduate degree in computer system engineering at Jungwon University. Despite a difficult start adapting to her new environment, which she later reflected were the most challenging of her life, Jager graduated from Jungwon University and returned to Denmark in 2018 after five years in South Korea. As of 2019 Jager was enrolled in a postgraduate programme at the Technical University of Denmark.

== Career ==
=== Early career (2009–2012) ===
Jager made her first appearance for the Danish national team at the 2009 Archery World Cup. She later participated in the 2010 European Archery Championships and the 2011 World Archery Championships, where she finished ninth overall in the women's individual competition. (Note: The Danish broadcaster DR credits Jager with fifth overall, though the World Archery Federation's official results document lists her final position as ninth.) The following year she made her Olympic debut at the 2012 Summer Olympics in London. She and teammates Carina Christiansen and Louise Laursen comprised Denmark's three-person entry for the women's team event, the nation's debut in the discipline. In the preliminary ranking round, which determined the seedings for the subsequent elimination rounds, the trio set a new Danish national record of 1,946 points over the 216-arrow contest, finishing with the eighth seed of the twelve competing nations. Victory over India in the first knockout round saw them advance to the quarter-finals, where they were eliminated by South Korea.

=== World Champion (2013) ===
In early 2013 Jager relocated to South Korea at the invitation of 1984 Olympic gold medal-winning coach Kim Hyung-Tak, one of two athletes selected by the Danish Archery Federation to undergo full-time training in the country ahead of the 2016 Summer Olympics. Jager spent six months under Kim's instruction before contesting the 2013 World Championships held in Belek, Turkey. She entered the tournament's individual event with an unimpressive record, having failed to progress beyond the last 32 competitors in an international competition since 2011. In the event's preliminary ranking stage Jager achieved a new Danish record for the 144-arrow round, scoring 1,351 points from a maximum of 1,440 to qualify for the subsequent elimination rounds as the eighth seed. Jager proceeded to deliver a surprising run of results in the knock-out rounds, eliminating both Ki Bo-bae and Yun Ok-hee, the World Archery Federation's number one and number two-ranked archers respectively, to enter the final against Xu Jing, who had achieved a silver medal in the women's team event at the 2012 Summer Olympics. After tying on five set points each over the regulation five sets, Jager outshot Xu in the subsequent tiebreaking one-arrow shoot-off, landing her single arrow 1 millimetre (0.039 in) closer to the centre of the target to claim the world championship title.

Jager's victory earned her a second medal of the championships, having earlier secured bronze medal in the women's team event with Carina Christiansen and Anne Marie Laursen. Her two medals contributed to Denmark's most successful World Championship performance on record. She afterwards credited her move to South Korea as being key to winning the individual title. For her achievements she was named Danish Sports Name of the Year for 2013 by the Danish Olympic Committee and the Jyllands-Posten newspaper, beating racing driver Tom Kristensen and skeet shooter Jesper Hansen to the accolade. Her title was later credited as popularising the sport of archery in Denmark in the run-up to the 2015 World Championships held in Copenhagen.

=== Later career (2014– ) ===
Jager combined with Nikolaj Wulff at the 2014 European Archery Championships to win silver in the mixed team recurve event. She later achieved a second silver medal at the European Games the following year as the runner-up to Germany's Karina Winter in the women's individual event. The 2015 World Championships in July however saw her fail to defend both her individual title, losing in the second round by Mexico's Karla Hinojosa, and her team bronze medal, where she and her teammates Carina Christiansen and Natasja Bech failed to attain a high enough rank to qualify for the team elimination rounds. In June 2016 Jager was defeated by Christiansen in the Olympic qualifying tournament, eliminating her from contention for the following month's Olympic Games in Rio de Janeiro.

At the 2018 European Archery Championships Jager finished runner-up in the women's individual event to Turkey's Yasemin Anagoz, who outscored her in a one-arrow shoot-off. Jager combined with Randi Degn and Anne Marie Laursen at the 2019 European Games in June to win bronze in the women's team competition, but was herself knocked out of the women's individual event at the last sixteen stage. That same month Jager secured qualification for the 2020 Summer Olympics in Tokyo, marking her second appearance at the Games and her country's first in the archery competitions since 2012. The outbreak of the global COVID-19 pandemic would later see the 2020 Olympics postponed until July 2021, and at the rescheduled Games Jager was eliminated by Russia's Ksenia Perova in the second round of the women's individual event.

== Notes ==
Awards and achievements
Preceded by Lasse Norman Hansen	Danish Sports Name of the Year; 2013	Succeeded by Camilla Pedersen
