= 2013 World Archery Championships =

- Location: Antalya, Turkey
- Start date: 29 September
- End date: 6 October
- Competitors: 441 from 69 nations

The 2013 World Archery Championships was the 47th edition of the event. It was held in Antalya, Turkey from 29 September to 6 October 2013 and was organised by World Archery Federation (FITA). It was immediately preceded by the 50th World Archery Federation congress in the same location. Qualification and elimination rounds took place at the Papillon Sports Centre in nearby Kadriye, with the medal matches on 5–6 October on the beach of Belek.

For the first time, the event was streamed live on the World Archery Federation YouTube channel, ArcheryTV. The recurve team final was broadcast live on Eurosport 2 and other finals shown on a delay.

== Schedule ==
All times are local (UTC+02:00).

Date	Time	Event	Phase
30 September	09:30	RW / CM	Qualification
30 September	14:15	RW / CW	Qualification
1 October	09:00	RM	Qualification
1 October	16:35	RXT / CXT	Eliminations / QF / SF
2 October	09:30	RM / RW	Eliminations
2 October	15:00	CM / CW	Eliminations
3 October	09:30	RM / RW / CM / CW	Eliminations / QF / SF
3 October	14:30	RMT / RWT	Eliminations / QF / SF
4 October	09:30	CMT / CWT	Eliminations / QF / SF
5 October	11:00	CMT / CWT	Medal matches
5 October	15:00	CXT / CM / CW	Medal matches
6 October	11:00	RMT / RWT	Medal matches
6 October	15:00	RXT / RM / RW	Medal matches

== Medals table ==
* Host nation (Turkey)

Rank	Nation	Gold	Silver	Bronze	Total
1	South Korea	3	1	1	5
2	Denmark	2	0	1	3
3	Netherlands	1	2	0	3
4	United States	1	1	1	3
5	Colombia	1	0	0	1
5	Germany	1	0	0	1
5	Italy	1	0	0	1
8	France	0	1	3	4
9	Russia	0	1	1	2
9	South Africa	0	1	1	2
11	Belarus	0	1	0	1
11	China	0	1	0	1
11	Croatia	0	1	0	1
14	Canada	0	0	1	1
14	Chinese Taipei	0	0	1	1
Totals (15 entries)		10	10	10	30

== Medals summary ==
=== Recurve ===
Event	Gold	Silver	Bronze
Men's individual	Lee Seung-yun; South Korea	Oh Jin-hyek; South Korea	Crispin Duenas; Canada
Women's individual	Maja Jager; Denmark	Xu Jing; China	Yun Ok-hee; South Korea
Men's team	United States; Brady Ellison; Joe Fanchin; Jake Kaminski	Netherlands; Sjef van den Berg; Rick van den Oever; Rick van der Ven	France; Thomas Faucheron; Gaël Prévost; Jean-Charles Valladont
Women's team	South Korea; Chang Hye-jin; Ki Bo-bae; Yun Ok-hee	Belarus; Hanna Marusava; Yekaterina Mulyuk-Timofeyeva; Alena Tolkach	Denmark; Carina Rosenvinge Christiansen; Maja Jager; Anne Marie Laursen
Mixed team	South Korea; Ki Bo-bae; Oh Jin-hyek	United States; Khatuna Lorig; Brady Ellison	Chinese Taipei; Tan Ya-ting; Kuo Cheng-wei

=== Compound ===
Event	Gold	Silver	Bronze
Men's individual	Mike Schloesser; Netherlands	Pierre-Julien Deloche; France	Alexander Dambaev; Russia
Women's individual	Kristina Berger; Germany	Ivana Buden; Croatia	Gerda Roux; South Africa
Men's team	Denmark; Martin Damsbo; Stephan Hansen; Patrick Laursen	South Africa; Gabriel Badenhorst; DP Bierman; Patrick Roux	France; Sebastien Brasseur; Pierre-Julien Deloche; Dominique Genet
Women's team	Colombia; Aura Bravo; Sara López; Alejandra Usquiano	Netherlands; Martine Couwenberg; Irina Markovic; Inge van Caspel	France; Sophie Dodemont; Pascale Lebecque; Sandrine Vandionant
Mixed team	Italy; Marcella Tonioli; Sergio Pagni	Russia; Albina Loginova; Alexander Dambaev	United States; Erika Jones; Jesse Broadwater

== Participating nations ==
At the close of registrations, 69 nations had registered 441 athletes, fewer than the 2011 World Championships which had doubled as qualification for the 2012 Olympic competition.

- Argentina (6)
- Armenia (2)
- Australia (12)
- Austria (6)
- Bangladesh (6)
- Belarus (7)
- Belgium (4)
- Bhutan (4)
- Brazil (12)
- Canada (12)
- Chile (2)
- China (6)
- Chinese Taipei (6)
- Colombia (12)
- Croatia (5)
- Cyprus (4)
- Czech Republic (6)
- Denmark (8)
- Dominican Republic (2)
- El Salvador (1)
- Estonia (7)
- Finland (7)
- France (12)
- Georgia (3)
- Germany (12)
- Greece (2)
- Hong Kong (2)
- Hungary (1)
- India (12)
- Iran (4)
- Iraq (5)
- Ireland (4)
- Israel (1)
- Italy (12)
- Ivory Coast (4)
- Japan (8)
- Kazakhstan (12)
- North Korea (4)
- South Korea (12)
- Kosovo (3)
- Latvia (3)
- Lithuania (7)
- Luxembourg (3)
- Malaysia (4)
- Mexico (12)
- Moldova (2)
- Mongolia (6)
- Netherlands (10)
- New Zealand (2)
- Norway (8)
- Poland (9)
- Portugal (1)
- Romania (4)
- Russia (12)
- Serbia (4)
- Slovakia (8)
- Slovenia (2)
- South Africa (6)
- Spain (9)
- Sri Lanka (1)
- Sweden (10)
- Switzerland (7)
- Tajikistan (2)
- Thailand (6)
- Turkey (12)
- Ukraine (7)
- United Kingdom (12)
- United States (12)
- Venezuela (11)
