= 2013 World Archery Championships – Recurve mixed team =

The mixed team recurve competition at the 2013 World Archery Championships took place from 29 September to 6 October 2013 in Belek, Turkey.

46 countries entered at least one male and one female archer in the qualification round, making them eligible for the mixed team competition. The combined scores of the highest-scoring archers of each gender from the same country in the qualification rounds were added together, and the 16 teams with the highest combined totals advanced to the elimination rounds.

== Schedule ==
All times are local (UTC+02:00).

Date	Rime	Phase
29 September	14:00	Official practice
30 September	09:30	Women's qualification
1 October	09:00	Men's qualification
1 October	16:35	1/8, QF, and SF Eliminations
6 October	17:00	Medal matches

== Qualification round ==
Pre-tournament world rankings ('WR') are taken from the 28 August 2013 World Archery Rankings.

Qualified for eliminations

Rank	Nation	Name	Score	WR
1	South Korea	Ki Bo-bae; Oh Jin-hyek	2733	1
2	Mexico	Aída Román; Luis Álvarez	2694	4
3	Russia	Inna Stepanova; Alexey Nikolaev	2689	9
4	Chinese Taipei	Tan Ya-ting; Kuo Cheng-wei	2679	8
5	India	Deepika Kumari; Jayanta Talukdar	2676	5
6	United States	Khatuna Lorig; Brady Ellison	2675^{139;48}	2
7	China	Xu Jing; Dai Xiaoxiang	2675^{131;52}	3
8	United Kingdom	Naomi Folkard; Larry Godfrey	2661	10
9	Japan	Ayano Kato; Takaharu Furukawa	2660	7
10	Italy	Natalia Valeeva; Mauro Nespoli	2659	6
11	Spain	Magali Foulon; Juan Ignacio Rodríguez	2655	30
12	Ukraine	Lidiia Sichenikova; Markiyan Ivashko	2648^{118;40}	11
13	France	Noemie Brianne; Jean-Charles Valladont	2648^{112;35}	15
14	Brazil	Sarah Nikitin; Marcus Vinicius D'Almeida	2645	18
15	Germany	Elena Richter; Sebastian Rohrberg	2641	13
16	Colombia	Ana Rendón; Daniel Pacheco	2634	26
17	Mongolia	Bishindeegiin Urantungalag; Jantsangiin Gantögs	2633^{120;40}	17
18	Australia	Deonne Bridger; Taylor Worth	2633^{114;23}	20
19	Denmark	Maja Jager; Johan Weiss	2629	34
20	Poland	Karina Lipiarska; Piotr Nowak	2616	12
21	Netherlands	Shireen-Zoe de Vries; Sjef van den Berg	2612^{114;45}	36
22	Canada	Georcy-Stephanie Thiffeault Picard; Crispin Duenas	2612^{99;42}	22
23	Belarus	Hanna Marusava; Mikalai Marusau	2610	19
24	North Korea	Ryu Un-hyang; Jon Chol	2587	27
25	Turkey	Aybüke Aktuna; Cevdet Demiral	2586	14
26	Moldova	Alexandra Mîrca; Dan Olaru	2584	
27	Ireland	Sinead Cuthbert; Keith Hanlon	2583	52
28	Sweden	Christine Bjerendal; Sebastian Djerf	2573	50
29	Venezuela	Leidys Brito; Miguel Ramos	2567	16
30	Romania	Simona Băncilă; Daniel Ciornei	2553	
31	Switzerland	Celine Schobinger; Thomas Rufer	2552	25
32	Kazakhstan	Farida Tukebaeva; Oibek Saidiyev	2547	23
33	Estonia	Reena Pärnat; Pearu Jakob Ojamae	2545	
34	Chile	Sophia Moraga; Guillermo Aguilar Gimpel	2534	22
35	Dominican Republic	Lya Solano; Andres Alfonseca	2533	31
36	Cyprus	Elena Mousikou; Mimis El Helali	2527	54
37	Argentina	Maria Gabriela Goni; Fabian Cardenas	2486	32
38	Iran	Melika Abdolkarimi; Nader Manoochehrimoghadam	2483	39
39	Ivory Coast	Carla Frangilli; Philippe Kouassi	2482	59
40	Slovakia	Lenka Harcarikova; Matúš Hanzlík	2473	
41	Latvia	Anete Kreicberga; Eduards Lapsins	2455	
42	Greece	Anatoli Martha Gkorila; Stefanos Tserkezis	2422	55
43	Bangladesh	Shamoli Ray; Md Ruhan Shana	2417	
44	Armenia	Nune Vasilyan; Arshak Petrosyan	2402	41
45	Iraq	Rand Al-Mashhadani; Ahmed Mahmmood	2369	
46	Bhutan	Sherab Zam; Nima Wangdi	2327	

== Elimination rounds ==
1st round
1	South Korea	148
16	Colombia	144
9	Japan	138
8	United Kingdom	144
5	India	149
12	Ukraine	140
13	France	139^{14}
4	Chinese Taipei	139^{17}
3	Russia	146
14	Brazil	143
11	Spain	133
6	United States	148
7	China	141
10	Italy	144
15	Germany	138
2	Mexico	144

Quarterfinals
1	South Korea	152
8	United Kingdom	146
5	India	137
4	Chinese Taipei	139
3	Russia	138
6	United States	142
10	Italy	146^{16}
2	Mexico	146^{19}

Semifinals
1	South Korea	149
4	Chinese Taipei	139
6	United States	146
2	Mexico	132

Finals
1	South Korea	148
6	United States	139
Third place
4	Chinese Taipei	145
2	Mexico	143
