= Archery at the 2012 Summer Olympics – Qualification =

There were 128 qualifying places available for archery at the 2012 Summer Olympics: 64 for men and 64 for women.

Each National Olympic Committee (NOC) can enter a maximum of 6 competitors, 3 per each gender. NOCs that qualify teams for a particular gender are able to send a three-member team to the team event and also have each member compete in the individual event. There were 12 team spots for each gender, thus qualifying 36 individuals through team qualification. All other NOCs may earn a maximum of 1 quota place per gender for the individual events.

6 places are reserved for Great Britain as host nation, and a further 6 shall be decided upon by the Tripartite Commission. The remaining 116 places shall therefore be allocated through a qualification process, in which archers earn quota places for their respective NOCs, though not necessarily for themselves.

To be eligible to participate in the Olympic Games after the NOC has obtained a quota place, all archers must have achieved the following Minimum Qualification Score (MQS):

- Men: FITA round of 1230 or 70m round of 625
- Women: FITA round of 1230 or 70m round of 600

The MQS must be achieved between 2 July 2011 (starting at the 2011 World Outdoor Archery Championships) and 1 July 2012 at a registered FITA event.

== Qualification summary ==
Nation	Men		Women		Total
Nation	Men's individual	Men's team	Women's individual	Women's team	Athletes
Australia	1		1		2
Bangladesh	1				1
Belarus			1		1
Bhutan			1		1
Brazil	1				1
Bulgaria	1				1
Canada	1		1		2
Chile			1		1
China	3	X	3	X	6
Colombia	1		1		2
Ivory Coast	1				1
Cuba	1				1
Denmark			3	X	3
Egypt	1		1		2
Estonia			1		1
Fiji	1				1
France	3	X	1		4
Georgia			1		1
Germany	1		1		2
Great Britain	3	X	3	X	6
Greece			1		1
Hong Kong	1				1
Iran	1		1		2
Iraq			1		1
India	3	X	3	X	6
Indonesia			1		1
Italy	3	X	3	X	6
Japan	3	X	3	X	6
Kazakhstan	1		1		2
Luxembourg	1				1
Malaysia	3	X	1		4
Mexico	3	X	3	X	6
Moldova	1				1
Mongolia	1		1		2
Myanmar	1				1
Netherlands	1				1
Norway	1				1
North Korea			1		1
Philippines	1		1		2
Poland	1		1		2
Russia			3	X	3
Samoa			1		1
San Marino	1				1
South Africa			1		1
South Korea	3	X	3	X	6
Spain	1		1		2
Slovenia	1				1
Sweden			1		1
Switzerland	1		1		2
Chinese Taipei	3	X	3	X	6
Thailand	1				1
Turkey			1		1
Ukraine	3	X	3	X	6
United States	3	X	3	X	6
Venezuela	1		1		2
Total: 55 NOCs	64	12	64	12	128

== Qualification timeline ==
Event	Date	Venue
2011 World Archery Championships	July 2–10, 2011	(Italy) Turin
2011 Asian Championships	October 19–25, 2011	(Iran) Tehran
Open New Zealand Championships (2012 Oceanian Championships)	January 1–2, 2012	(New Zealand) Wellington
2012 African Championships	Mar 12-16, 2012	(Morocco) Rabat
2012 Pan American Championships	April 17–22, 2012	(Colombia) Medellín
2012 European Championships	May 21–26, 2012	(Netherlands) Amsterdam
Final Qualification Tournament	June 21–22, 2012	(United States) Ogden

== Men ==
Event	Location	Athletes per NOC	Total places	Qualified
Team
Host Nation	—	3	3	Great Britain
2011 Outdoor World Championships	(Italy) Turin	3	24	South Korea; Mexico; United States; France; Ukraine; China; Italy; Malaysia
Final Qualification Tournament	(United States) Ogden	3	9	Japan; India; Chinese Taipei
Individual
2011 Outdoor World Championships	(Italy) Turin	1	5*	Canada; Spain; Luxembourg; Mongolia; Norway
Asian Championships	(Iran) Tehran	1	3	Iran; Thailand; Hong Kong
Open New Zealand Championships (Oceanian Championships)	(New Zealand) Wellington	1	2	Australia; Fiji
Pan American Championships	(Colombia) Medellín	1	3	Cuba; Brazil; Colombia
European Championships	(Netherlands) Amsterdam	1	3**	Netherlands; Moldova; Germany
African Championships	(Morocco) Rabat	1	2	Egypt; Ivory Coast
Final Qualification Tournament	(United States) Ogden	1	7*	Poland; Bulgaria; Switzerland; Venezuela; Philippines; Kazakhstan; Slovenia
Tripartite Commission	TBD	1	3	Bangladesh; Myanmar; San Marino
Total			64	

- Eight spots were initially available through the World Championships individual events. Three of those spots were taken by Japan, India and Chinese Taipei. Those NOCs later won team places at the Final Qualification team event. This team qualification replaced the individual qualifications from the World Championships and released three further individual quota places to be awarded at the Final Qualification individual event.
- Israel rejected its quota place won at the European Qualification Tournament. Fourth-placed Camilo Mayr from Germany qualifies instead.

== Women ==
Event	Location	Athletes per NOC	Total places	Qualified
Team
Host Nation	—	3	3	Great Britain
2011 Outdoor World Championships	(Italy) Turin	3	24	South Korea; Ukraine; India; Italy; Chinese Taipei; Russia; China; Denmark
Final Qualification Tournament	(United States) Ogden	3	9	Japan; Mexico; United States
Individual
2011 Outdoor World Championships	(Italy) Turin	1	6*	Belarus; Chile; France; Georgia; Poland; North Korea
Asian Championships	(Iran) Tehran	1	3	Indonesia; Mongolia; Malaysia
Open New Zealand Championships (Oceanian Championships)	(New Zealand) Wellington	1	2	Australia; Samoa
Pan American Championships	(Colombia) Medellín	1	2*	Canada; Colombia
European Championships	(Netherlands) Amsterdam	1	3	Spain; Sweden; Germany
African Championships	(Morocco) Rabat	1	2	Egypt; South Africa
Final Qualification Tournament	(United States) Ogden	1	8*	Philippines; Estonia; Kazakhstan; Turkey; Switzerland; Venezuela; Greece; Iran
Tripartite Commission	TBD	1	2	Iraq; Bhutan
Total			64	

- Eight spots were initially available through the World Championships individual events, and three in the Pan American Championships. Three of those spots were taken by Japan, Mexico, and the United States. Those NOCs later won team places at the Final Qualification team event. This team qualification replaced the individual qualifications from the World Championships and released three further individual quota places to be awarded at the Final Qualification individual event. One of the three Tripartite Commission places was also added to the Final Qualification individual event.

== See also ==
- Archery at the Summer Olympics#Qualification
