= Vanessa Lee (archer) =

Canadian archer (born 1988)

Personal information
- Born: 25 November 1988 (age 37) Toronto, Ontario, Canada
- Education: University of Toronto, Oxford Brooks University

Sport
- Country: Canada
- Sport: Archery

Vanessa Lee (born 25 November 1988) is a Canadian professional archer, previously a physiotherapist and currently UX designer of Korean-Canadian origin. She has represented Canada at the 2011 Pan American Games and at the 2011 and 2013 World Archery Championships.
