= Thomas Faucheron =

French archer (born 1990)

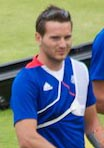
- Faucheron in 2012

Personal information
- Born: 23 February 1990 (age 36) Rennes, France
Medal record
Men's recurve archery
Men's archery
Representing France
World Championships
Bronze medal – third place	2013 Belek	Team
Summer Universiade
Bronze medal – third place	2011 Shenzhen	Team

Thomas Faucheron (born 23 February 1990 in Rennes) is a French archer. At the 2012 Summer Olympics he competed in the Men's team event and the men's individual event. In the individual event, he was 27th after the ranking rounds, and beat Witthaya Thamwong in the first knockout round before losing to teammate Gael Prevost in the second. In the team event, France were ranked second after the ranking round but lost to Mexico in the quarterfinals.

In 2013, he was part of the French men's team that won bronze at the World Championship, alongside Prevost and Jean-Charles Valladont. The French team beat Spain and Italy before losing to the USA in the semifinal. In the bronze medal match, France beat South Korea by one point, 228 to 227.
