= Gerda Roux =

South African archer (born 1973)

Medal record

Women's archery

Representing South Africa

World Championships
Bronze medal – third place	2013 Belek	Individual

Gerda Roux (born 4 December 1973), is a South African athlete who competes in compound archery. After starting archery in June 2012, she achieved international success winning the bronze medal at the major World Archery Federation competition, the World Archery Championships, in 2013. Her husband, Patrick Roux, won a team silver medal at the same event. She has also represented South Africa at the Archery World Cup.
