= Kristina Berger =

German archer (born 1988)

Personal information
- Born: 20 June 1988 (age 38)

Sport
- Sport: Archery
- Event: compound
Medal record
Women's archery
Representing Germany
World Championships
Gold medal – first place	2013 Belek	Individual
Silver medal – second place	2017 Mexico	Mixed team
Bronze medal – third place	2017 Mexico	Individual
World Archery 3D Championships
Silver medal – second place	2017 Robion	Individual
World University Championships
Gold medal – first place	2012 Córdoba	Individual
Silver medal – second place	2012 Córdoba	Mixed team
World Games
Bronze medal – third place	2013 Cali	Mixed Team
European Archery Championships
Gold medal – first place	2012 Amsterdam	Individual
Gold medal – first place	2012 Amsterdam	Team

Kristina Heigenhauser (born Kristina Berger, 20 June 1988) is a German compound archer. She achieved a career high world ranking of 2 in women's compound archery in 2013.

== Career ==
She has won medals at the FITA Archery World Cup, reaching the World Cup Finals in 2012 and 2013, the World Archery Championships and the World Games.

Before taking up archery, Berger was a three time national pistol shooting champion.
