= Samuli Piippo =

Finnish archer (born 1980)

Personal information
- Full name: Samuli Piippo
- Born: 1 January 1980 (age 46) Raahe, Finland
- Height: 1.81 m (5 ft 11 in)
- Weight: 75 kg (165 lb)

Sport
- Country: Finland
- Sport: Archery
- Event: Recurve
- Club: Oulun Jousimiehet
- Updated on 24 February 2017

Samuli Piippo (born 1 January 1980) is a Finnish competitive archer. A late beginner in competitive archery, Piippo made his debut on the Finnish national team at the age of 33, and roused a major surprise in his sporting career by booking one of the three individual Olympic places to Rio 2016 at the European Championships in Nottingham, Great Britain. While training full-time at a local archery range in his current residence Oulu, Piippo works as a web applications designer for an information technology firm.

Piippo was selected to compete for Finland in the men's individual recurve at the 2016 Summer Olympics in Rio de Janeiro, Brazil. Sitting at fifty-fourth position from the initial stage of the competition with a score of 636 points, Piippo lost his opening round match to the eleventh-seeded German archer Florian Floto, who successfully dispatched him through a comfortable 6–0 challenge.
