= Elisa Barnard =

Australian archer

Personal information
- Nationality: Australian
- Born: 27 May 1993 (age 33) Sydney, Australia
- Height: 171 cm (67 in) (2012)
- Weight: 58 kg (128 lb) (2012)

Sport
- Country: Australia
- Sport: Archery
- Event: Women's recurve

Elisa Barnard (born 27 May 1993 in Sydney, Australia) is an Australian recurve archer. She has won the Australian Open and the Oceania Championships and represented Australia in archery at the 2012 Summer Olympics.

== Personal ==
Barnard matriculated from MLC Burwood in Sydney in 2010 and was placed on the All-round Achievers List for the Higher School Certificate.

Her father, Jonathan Barnard, the president of Sydney Olympic Park Archery, was accused of intimidating another Australian archer, Odette Snazelle, during competitions. The matter went to court. Members of the Australian Archery community implied Snazelle's motives in accusing Barnard's father of harassment were in order to make Barnard ineligible for the Games so Snazelle could take her place.

As of 2015, Barnard is in her final year of a combined Bachelor of Arts (Psychology) and Bachelor of Laws degree at Macquarie University, having been awarded a 2013 University Blue.

Barnard is 171 centimetres (67 in) tall and weighs 58 kilograms (128 lb).

== Archery ==
Barnard competes in the women's recurve archery event. She took up the sport following a foot injury that did not allow her to participate in tennis or gymnastics. She has an archery scholarship with the New South Wales Institute of Sport.

In 2011, Barnard finished first at the Adelaide hosted Australian Open in the individual recurve event and finished first at the Hamilton hosted Oceania Championships.

Barnard competed in several archery events in 2012 including the national championships in Canberra in March, the World Cup 1 event in April in China, the World Cup 2 event in May in Turkey, and the World Cup 3 event in the United States in June. She finished seventeenth at the China World Cup event. The World Cup 3 event was the final Olympic qualifying event, where she finished seventeenth in the recurve individual event. In January 2012, she came in first at the New Zealand-hosted Oceania Championships. She also finished first at the 2012 Australian National Championships. She represented Australia at the 2012 Summer Olympics.
