= Wioleta Myszor =

Polish archer (born 1983)

Personal information
- Born: 19 January 1983 (age 43) Olkusz, Poland

Sport
- Sport: Recurve archery
- Club: LKS Łucznik Żywiec
Medal record
Representing Poland
Summer Universiade
Bronze medal – third place	2005 Izmir	Team

Wioleta Myszor (born 19 January 1983) is a Polish archer specializing in recurve archery. She is a silver medalist at the World Indoor Championships, European Indoor Champion, and multiple Polish Championship medalist. Myszor also competed for Poland at the 2024 Summer Olympics.

== Career ==
Her greatest success came at the 2016 World Indoor Archery Championships in Ankara, where she, along with Natalia Leśniak and Karina Lipiarska-Pałka, won the team silver medal, losing the gold to Japan. The following year at the 2017 European Indoor Archery Championships in Vittel, she, together with Leśniak and Karolina Farasiewicz, won the gold medal.

During the 2005 Summer Universiade, she won a bronze medal in the team event (with Justyna Mospinek and Anna Szukalska). In 2009, she participated in the Universiade in Belgrade, where she finished 38th individually and 5th in the team competition.
