= Alice Ingley =

Australian archer (born 1993)

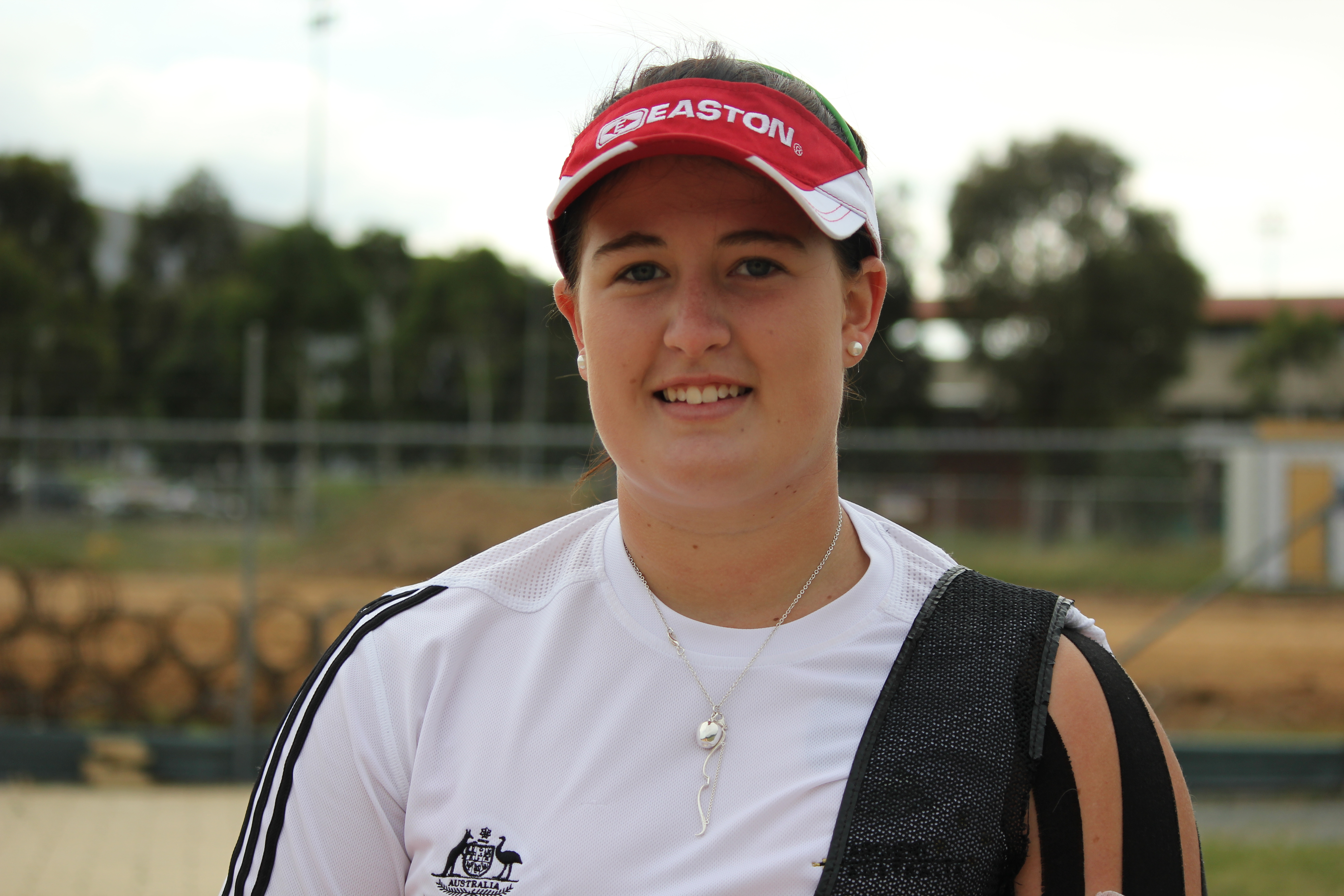
- Ingley at the Australian National Archery Championship

Personal information
- Nationality: Australian
- Born: 13 January 1993 (age 33) Subiaco, Australia

Sport
- Country: Australia
- Sport: Archery
- Event: Recurve bow
- Club: Yokine Archery Club

Achievements and titles
- National finals: 1st (2010 Australian Junior National Championships); 2nd (2009 Australian Senior National Championships)

Alice Ingley (born 13 January 1993) is an Australian archer from Western Australia. She competes for the Yokine Archery Club, and made her national debut in 2007 at the Australian Junior National Championships. She first competed internationally in 2009 at the World Cup 2 in Turkey.

== Personal ==
Ingley is from Subiaco, Western Australia and has lived in the Australian Capital Territory. Her British ancestors lived in the same area as the historical Robin Hood. She is right handed. Beyond archery, she has played netball, Karate, swimming, gymnastics, tennis, athletics and soccer.

Ingley attended Lake Ginninderra College and Edith Cowan University, where she is studying for a Bachelor of Arts degree.

== Archery ==
Ingley first started in archery when she was 12 years old. She was keen to play sport alongside her brothers as her brothers and fathers were involved in archery at the time. When she was fifteen, she earned a scholarship at the Australian Institute of Sport, where she was based for two and a half years. She competes in club competitions for the Yokine Archery Club. She trains there with her older brother, Callum Ingley. She is coached by Simon Fairweather, who has been her coach since 2009.

2007 Australian Junior National Championships was her the first national competition. 2009 was a busy year, during which Ingley accomplished several things in the sport. Her first international competition was the 2009 World Cup 2 in Turkey. That year, she also earned three Australian Youth Olympic titles. She finished second at the 2009 Australian Senior National Championships.

2010 was another busy year, which included a first-place finish at the 2010 Australian Junior National Championships, where she led the field by 155 points. She participated in the Youth Olympics in Singapore, Australia's only female archer at the Games. She was eliminated in the quarter-final round of the individual women's recurve event, finishing ninth overall. In the mixed team event, she and teammate Ben Nott finished fifth. She was then named to the Australian archery team for the 2010 Commonwealth Games.

Ingley competed in several events in 2011, including the Chinese hosted World University Games and the World Archery Youth Championships in Poland. In September 2011, she was named to the Australian archery shadow Olympic team, attended a national team training camp in Canberra in September 2011 and then went to London in October 2011 for the Olympic test event at Lord's Cricket Ground. She made the podium at the Oceania Olympic Qualifying competition in January 2012. She attended a national team training camp in Canberra in March 2012. At the 2012 national championships in the team recurve event, she was part of Archery Western Australia's team. In the team target part, she had a score of 2,548. At the 2012 National Target Archery Championships, she finished second as a member of AWA. In March at the 2012 Olympic Games Nomination Shoot Results, she finished second with a score of 2548.

Ingley and Taylor Worth were nominally selected as Australia’s mixed team at the 2020 Tokyo Olympics but their combined scores in the individually ranking rounds were too low to achieve qualification for the actual event.
