= Rick van den Oever =

Dutch archer (born 1992)

Medal record

Men's archery

Representing Netherlands

World Championships
Silver medal – second place	2013 Belek	Team

World Indoor Championships
Bronze medal – third place	2014 Nîmes	Team

Youth Olympic Games
Silver medal – second place	2010 Singapore	Individual

Rick van den Oever (born 18 April 1992, Sint-Oedenrode) is a Dutch archer who participated at the 2010 Summer Youth Olympics in Singapore. He won the silver medal in the boys' event, losing to Ibrahim Sabry of Egypt in the final.
