= 2013 World Archery Championships – Compound mixed team =

The mixed team compound competition at the 2013 World Archery Championships took place on 29 September – 6 October 2013 in Belek, Turkey.

35 countries entered at least one male and one female archer into the qualification round, thus becoming eligible for the mixed team competition. The combined totals of the highest scoring archers of each gender from the same country in the qualification rounds were added together, and the 16 teams with the highest combined scores competed the elimination rounds.

== Schedule ==
All times are local (UTC+02:00).

Date	Time	Phase
29 September	14:00	Official practice
30 September	09:30	Men's qualification
30 September	14:15	Women's qualification
1 October	16:35	1/8, QF, and SF Eliminations
5 October	15:00	Medal matches

== Qualification round ==
Pre-tournament world rankings ('WR') are taken from the 28 August 2013 World Archery Rankings. 16th place was determined by a shootoff between Germany and Australia.

Qualified for eliminations

Rank	Nation	Name	Score	WR
1	United States	Erika Jones; Jesse Broadwater	1397	2
2	Russia	Albina Loginova; Alexander Dambaev	1396	4
3	South Korea	Seok Ji-hyun; Kim Jong-ho	1395	5
4	United Kingdom	Danielle Brown; Adam Ravenscroft	1393	15
5	Italy	Marcella Tonioli; Sergio Pagni	1391	1
6	Denmark	Camilla Sømod; Martin Damsbo	1388	7
7	Mexico	Linda Ochoa; Julio Ricardo Fierro	1388	6
8	Croatia	Maja Orlić; Mario Vavro	1385	28
9	France	Pascale Lebecque; Pierre-Julien Deloche	1384	11
10	Norway	Runa Grydeland; Morten Bøe	1382	18
11	India	Jyothi Surekha Vennam; Abhishek Verma	1382	12
12	Colombia	Sara López; Camilo Cardona	1381	14
13	South Africa	Danelle Wentzel; DP Bierman	1379	24
14	Netherlands	Inge van Caspel; Mike Schloesser	1377	3
15	Canada	Fiona McClean; Christopher Perkins	1376	13
16	Germany	Sabine Sauter; Marcus Laube	1372	9
17	Australia	Karina Marshall; Patrick Coghlan	1372	17
18	Sweden	Isabell Danielsson; Magnus Carlsson	1370	21
19	Japan	Kiyomi Hayashi; Yuta Yamamoto	1365	51
20	Turkey	Gizem Kocaman; Demir Elmaağaçlı	1363	41
21	Venezuela	Olga Bosch; Nelson Torres	1362	16
22	Ireland	Melanie Lawther; Darrel Wilson	1361	39
23	Lithuania	Inga Kizeliauskaitė; Vladas Šigauskas	1358	29
24	Belgium	Gladys Willems; Michael Cauwe	1357	10
25	Iran	Shabnam Sarlak; Majid Gheydi	1355	8
26	Brazil	Nely Acquesta; Marcelo Roriz Jr.	1354	36
27	New Zealand	Barbara Scott; Shaun Teasdale	1352	42
28	Spain	Andrea Marcos; Alberto Blázquez	1349	37
29	Finland	Anne Lantee; Mikko Juutilainen	1345	19
30	Iraq	Fatimah Almashhadani; Eshaaq al-Daghman	1337	
31	Slovakia	Katarina Durna; Matúš Ďurný Jr.	1329	49
32	Kazakhstan	Bibigul Izbassarova; Pavel Fisher	1328	20
33	Argentina	Vanina Backis; Juan Manuel Pérez	1316	31
34	Poland	Katarzyna Szalanska; Krzysztof Gorczyca	1293	45
35	Bangladesh	Ayasha Parvin Mohua; Ziaul Hoq Zia	1235	

== Elimination rounds ==
1st round
1	United States	148^{20}
16	Germany	148^{17}
9	France	146
8	Croatia	149
5	Italy	153
12	Colombia	148
13	South Africa	150
4	United Kingdom	148
3	South Korea	149
14	Netherlands	148
11	India	150
6	Denmark	147
7	Mexico	147
10	Norway	149
15	Canada	151
2	Russia	156

Quarterfinals
1	United States	153
8	Croatia	149
5	Italy	153
13	South Africa	149
3	South Korea	144
11	India	153
10	Norway	151^{16}
2	Russia	151^{18}

Semifinals
1	United States	147
5	Italy	154
11	India	147
2	Russia	150

Finals
5	Italy	155
2	Russia	149
Third place
1	United States	156
11	India	151
