= Gaël Prévost =

French archer

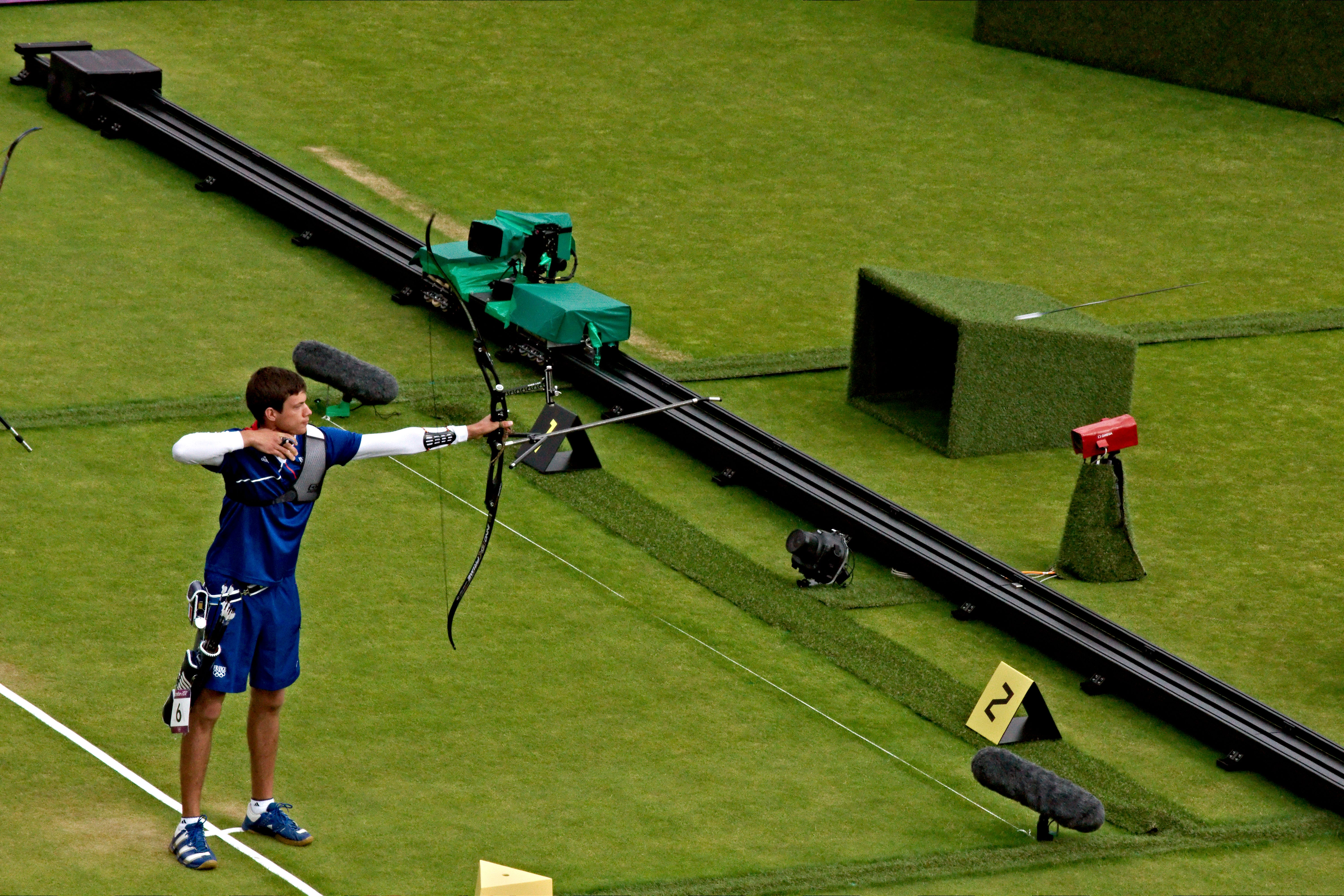

Personal information
- Nationality: French
- Born: 8 March 1994 (age 32)
- Height: 193 cm (6 ft 4 in)
- Weight: 75 kg (165 lb) (2012)

Sport
- Sport: Archery
- Club: Stade Clermontois Archerie
Medal record
World Championships
Bronze medal – third place	2013 Belek	Team
- Updated on 6 October 2012

Gaël Prevost (born 8 March 1994 in Clermont-Ferrand) is a French archer. At the 2012 Summer Olympics he competed for his country in the men's team event.
