= Philippe Kouassi =

Ivorian archer (born 1979)

Personal information
- Full name: René Philippe Kouassi
- Born: 14 December 1979 (age 46) Adzopé, Côte d'Ivoire
- Height: 190 cm (6 ft 3 in)
- Weight: 83 kg (183 lb)

Sport
- Country: Ivory Coast
- Sport: Archery
Medal record
African Championships
Gold medal – first place	2016 Windhoek	Recurve team, mixed
Bronze medal – third place	2012 Rabat	Recurve individual, men

René Philippe Kouassi (born 14 December 1979 in Adzopé, Côte d'Ivoire) is an Ivorian archer. He competed in the individual event at the 2012 Summer Olympics. At the 2016 Summer Olympics, he again competed in the individual event where he was defeated by Jean-Charles Valladont of France during the first round. He was the flag bearer for his country during the Olympic closing ceremony.
