= Ki Bo-bae =

South Korean archer (born 1988)

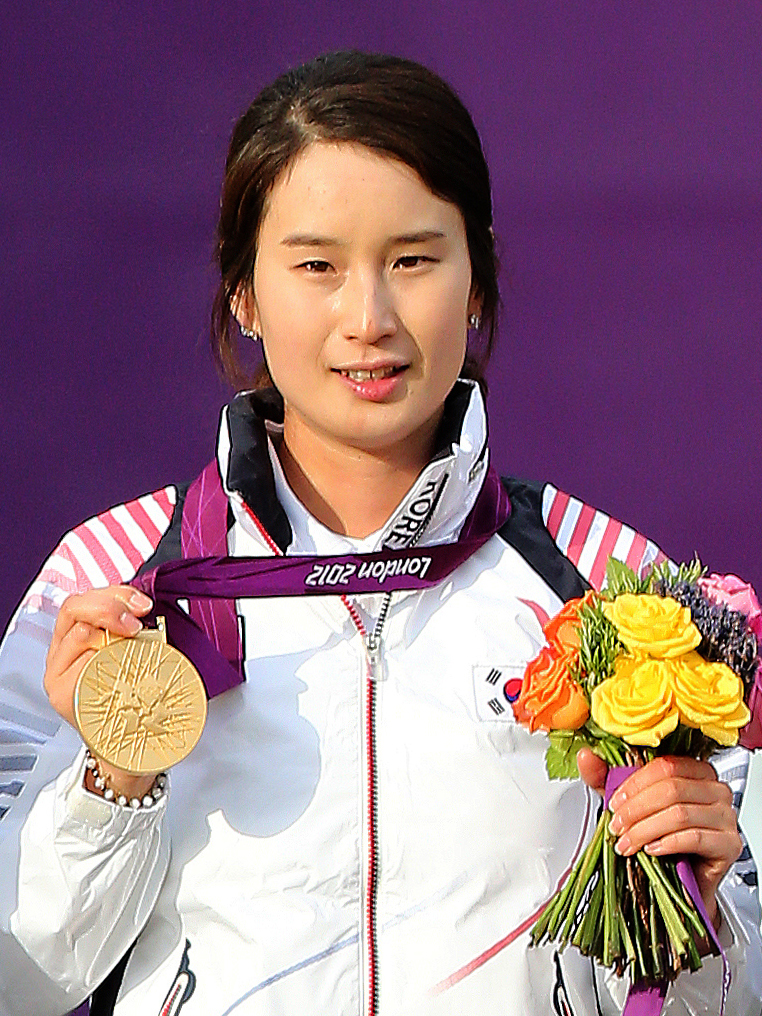
- Ki at the 2012 Summer Olympics

Personal information
- Nationality: South Korean
- Born: February 20, 1988 (age 38) Anyang, South Korea
- Education: Gwangju Women's University
- Height: 167 cm (5 ft 6 in)
- Weight: 57 kg (126 lb)

Sport
- Sport: Archery
- Event: Recurve archery
- Coached by: Park Chae-soon
Medal record
Women's recurve archery
Representing South Korea
Event	1st	2nd	3rd
Olympic Games	3	0	1
World Championships	5	0	2
World Cup Final	3	0	1
Asian Games	1	0	0
Universiade	5	1	0
Total	17	1	4
Event	1st	2nd	3rd
Women's individual	7	0	2
Women's team	5	1	2
Mixed team	5	0	0
Olympic Games
Gold medal – first place	2012 London	Individual
Gold medal – first place	2012 London	Team
Gold medal – first place	2016 Rio de Janeiro	Team
Bronze medal – third place	2016 Rio de Janeiro	Individual
World Championships
Gold medal – first place	2011 Turin	Mixed team
Gold medal – first place	2013 Belek	Team
Gold medal – first place	2013 Belek	Mixed team
Gold medal – first place	2015 Copenhagen	Individual
Gold medal – first place	2015 Copenhagen	Mixed team
Bronze medal – third place	2011 Turin	Team
Bronze medal – third place	2015 Copenhagen	Team
World Cup Final
Gold medal – first place	2012 Tokyo	Individual
Gold medal – first place	2016 Odense	Individual
Gold medal – first place	2017 Rome	Individual
Bronze medal – third place	2010 Edinburgh	Individual
Asian Games
Gold medal – first place	2010 Guangzhou	Team
Asian Championships
Gold medal – first place	2017 Dhaka	Team
Bronze medal – third place	2017 Dhaka	Individual
Universiade
Gold medal – first place	2011 Shenzhen	Individual
Gold medal – first place	2011 Shenzhen	Team
Gold medal – first place	2011 Shenzhen	Mixed team
Gold medal – first place	2015 Gwangju	Individual
Gold medal – first place	2015 Gwangju	Mixed team
Silver medal – second place	2015 Gwangju	Team

Korean name
- Hangul: 기보배
- RR: Gi Bobae
- MR: Ki Pobae

Ki Bo-bae (Korean: 기보배; Korean pronunciation: [ki.bo.bɛ̝] or [ki] [po.bɛ̝]; born February 20, 1988) is a South Korean recurve archer and three-time Olympic gold medalist. She was the winner of the women's team and women's individual events at the 2012 Summer Olympics and of the women's team event again at the 2016 Summer Olympics, where she also took bronze in the individual competition. Her tally of four Olympic medals places her among the most decorated archers in Olympic history.

Ki was introduced to archery in primary school and by 2010 was a member of the South Korean national team. In addition to the Olympics she has achieved gold medals at the World Archery Championships - becoming the women's recurve world champion in 2015 - the Asian Games, and the Summer Universiade, and is a three-time winner at the Archery World Cup finals. From 2015 to 2017 she held the world record score for the women's 72-arrow round and has twice held the position as the women's world number one in the World Archery Rankings.

== Early and personal life ==
Ki Bo-bae was born on February 20, 1988. She was introduced to archery at eleven years old when the sport was offered by her primary school.

In 2015, Ki was a graduate student at Gwangju Women's University, which allowed her to compete at the 2015 Summer Universiade, and as of 2017 she was pursuing a doctorate degree. She has expressed an interest in working with athletes of the Paralympic Games and teaching disabled children, as well as joining the International Olympic Committee as a member to assist in future bids by South Korea to host the Summer Olympics.

Ki announced her forthcoming marriage shortly after winning her third Archery World Cup in September 2017. She wed in a ceremony held two months later.

Ki acted as a torchbearer for the 2018 Winter Olympics torch relay.

== Career ==
=== 2010–2011: Early accolades ===
Ki was selected for the South Korean archery team alongside Joo Hyun-jung and Yun Ok-hee to contest the 2010 Asian Games in Guangzhou. Although eliminated by Cheng Meng of China in the quarter-finals of the women's individual competition, she won the gold medal in the women's event with Joo and Yun after the trio defeated the Chinese team in the final. At the 2011 Archery World Cup's second stage in Antalya she achieved a further team gold medal as well as a silver medal in the individual competition, finishing as runner-up to teammate Jung Dasomi. She later took what would be the first of three mixed team titles at the 2011 World Archery Championships.

=== 2012: Double Olympic Champion ===
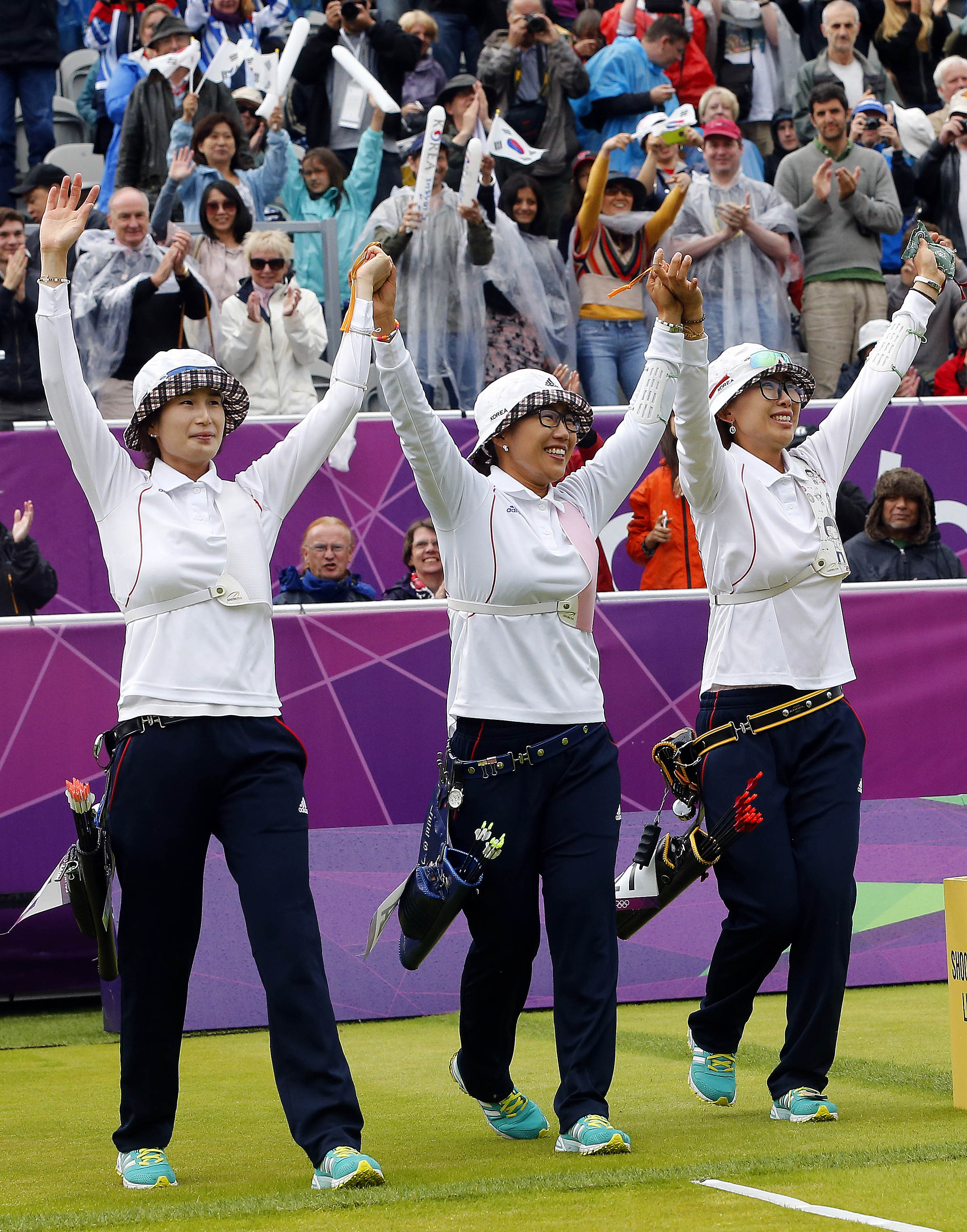
Ki (left) celebrates her 2012 gold medal win in the women's team event with Lee Sung-jin (centre) and Choi Hyeon-ju (right)

The 2012 Summer Olympics in London was Ki's first appearance at the Olympics. She began the preliminary 72-arrow ranking round with a score of 671 points from a maximum of 720, tying her at the top of the standings for the women's individual event with teammate Lee Sung-jin and Chinese Taipei's Tan Ya-ting. Ki was however ranked first and awarded the number one seed for the elimination rounds on countback after landing a higher number of arrows in the central ring of the target. With a combined score of 1,993 points, Ki, Lee, and Choi Hyeon-ju also secured the number one seed for South Korea in the women's team competition.

Ki and her teammates Lee and Choi delivered a narrow win over China in the final of the women's team event, which was contested prior to the individual event, to claim their nation's seventh consecutive Olympic gold medal in the discipline. As the third and final archer in the team's shooting sequence Ki was responsible for what became the final arrow of the match, securing victory over their Chinese rivals for the third successive Olympics by a single point. Ki won her second gold medal of the Games in the women's individual event contested later in the week, defeating Mexico's Aída Román in a closely fought final which necessitated a one-arrow shoot-off to determine the winner. Having tied 5-5 on set points over the preceding five sets of three arrows each, Ki and Román were both required to shoot a single tie-breaking arrow at the target with the archer firing closest to the centre winning. The pair both proceeded to shoot their arrows into the 8-ring of the target, but as Ki's effort was judged to have landed marginally closer to the centre, she was awarded the gold medal.

Ki was the sole member of the South Korean women's archery team to win two Olympic medals in London. Speaking in a press conference after the final Ki tearfully apologised for her final arrow, stating that "Koreans do not shoot eights". She also admitted she did not watch Roman's shoot her arrow because she was too deep in prayer.

Outside of the Olympics Ki delivered a strong performance in the 2012 Archery World Cup, beginning the competition with gold medals in the women's team and individual events at the opening stage in Shanghai. She qualified for the final stage held in Tokyo in September, where she advanced to the gold medal match and came from behind to defeat India's Deepika Kumari.

=== 2013–2015: Break and world record ===
In 2013 Ki won two gold medals at that year's World Archery Championships in Belek, taking her second mixed team title with Oh Jin-hyek and achieving the women's team title. Defeat to Denmark's Maja Jager however eliminated her from contention for the individual crown.

After shooting poorly in the national trials for the upcoming Asian Games in Incheon Ki was not selected for the national team in 2014, marking the first time in four years she had not been chosen. In an interview in the newspaper JoongAng Ilbo published at the end of the year Ki reflected that her initial response to her non-selection was one of relief, having gained freedom the strict training regimen by which team members had to abide. She later acknowledged that she had "relaxed too much" during the trials and lost her mental focus. Watching the archery competitions at the Asian Games that September, in which she performed commentary duties for the Korean broadcaster KBS, motivated her to work to return to the national squad. Her absence from the Korean team resulted in the loss of her position at the top of the World Archery Rankings, where she had held a rank of at least second since the end of the Olympics in 2012.

In 2015 Ki returned to the national team after finishing the national trials in first place. At July's Summer Universiade in Gwangju she set two new world records in the ranking round, her score of 686 points for the 72-arrow round surpassing Park Sung-hyun's eleven-year-old record set at the 2004 Summer Olympics by four points, while the combined total of 2,038 points achieved by her and teammates Kang Chae-young and Choi Mi-sun set a new world's best for the women's team event. Ki's subsequent victory over Choi in the final of the women's individual event represented her first gold medal win since the Archery World Cup almost three years earlier. She additionally won gold in the mixed team event.

Ki won two further gold medals at the 2015 World Archery Championships held later that summer in Copenhagen, earning a third mixed team gold with Ku Bonchan after defeating the pair of Lin Shih-chia and Kuo Cheng Wei from Chinese Taipei. She later defeated Lin for a second time in the women's individual recurve final. By mid-August she had returned to the top of the World Archery Rankings.

=== 2016–2017: Third Olympic gold ===
Ki entered the 2016 Summer Olympics in Rio de Janeiro as the sole returning member from South Korea's 2012 Olympic archery team. She was considered one of the favourites to win gold medal in the women's individual and team events, success in which would make her the first archer to defend an individual Olympic title and bring her level with the four career Olympic gold medals achieved by Kim Soo-nyung, regarded as the finest archer in the sport's history. Ki ended the ranking round with 663 points from 720, earning her the third seed for the women's individual event. With her teammates Choi Mi-sun and Chang Hye-jin finishing ranked first and second respectively, the trio also earned the top seed for the women's team competition.

Ki, Chang, and Choi concluded the women's team event with victory over Russia in the final, securing her third Olympic gold medal and South Korea's eighth consecutive Olympic women's team title. Afterwards she spoke of the high expectations and pressure placed on the team to continue their winning streak, but noted "we just continued working together and having very strong team work and it proved to be right". Ki's bid to become the first Olympic archer to retain their individual title was ended by Chang in the semi-finals, who outshot Ki in what Reuters described as an "upset" result. Ki went on to defeat fellow losing semi-finalist Alejandra Valencia of Mexico in the third-placed match to win the bronze medal.

Ki won her second Archery World Cup title in Odense in September, defeating Choi in the final to become the second female repeat winner in the tournament's history. The following year she achieved her third World Cup title in Rome with victory over Ksenia Perova.

== See also ==
- List of Olympic medalists in archery
- Korean archery
