= Pascale Lebecque =

French compound archer (born 1989)

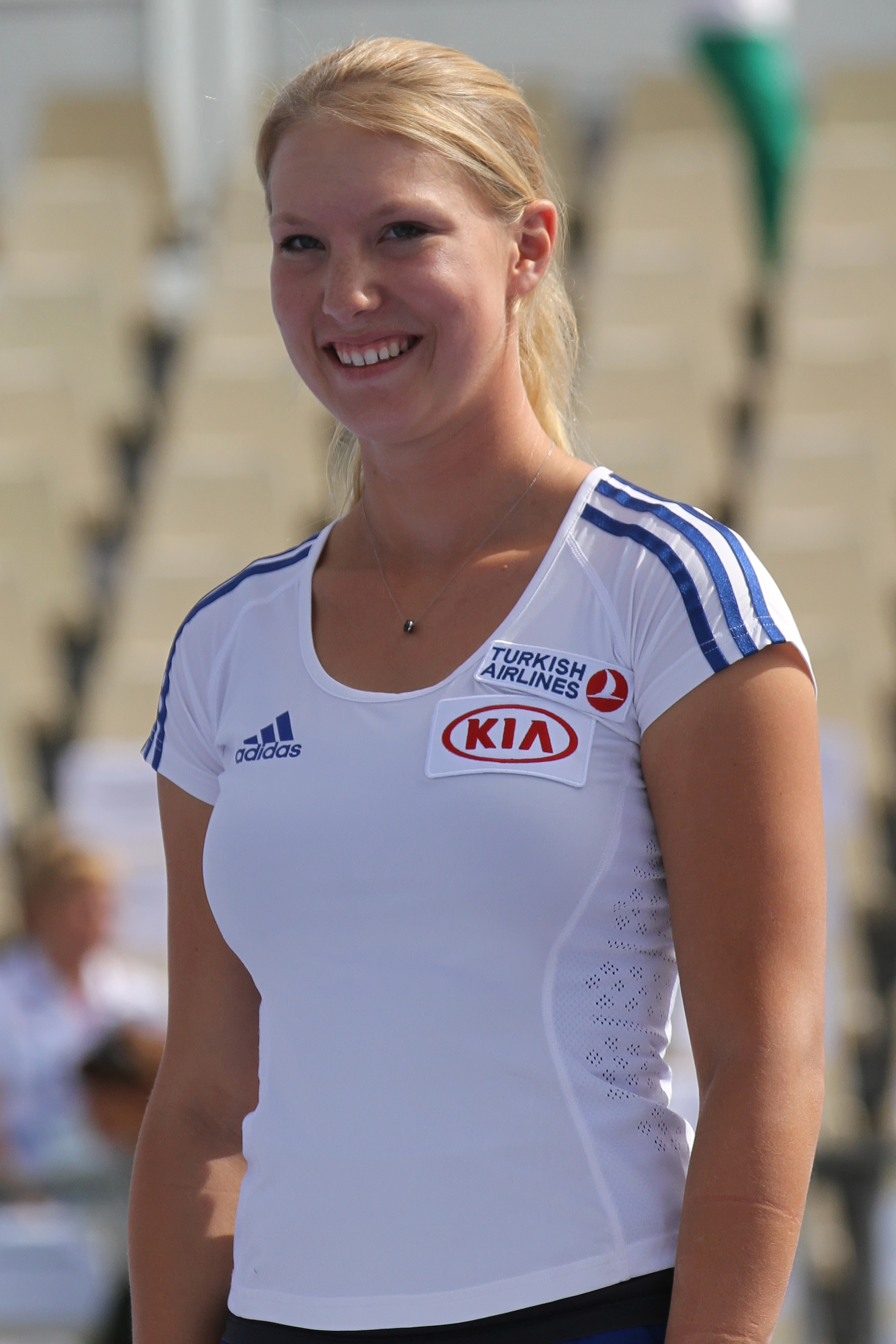
- Lebecque at FITA Archery World Cup in 2013

Personal information
- Citizenship: French
- Born: 18 April 1989 (age 37) France
Medal record
Women's archery
Representing France
World Championships
Silver medal – second place	2011 Turin	Individual
Bronze medal – third place	2013 Belek	Team
Summer Universiade
Gold medal – first place	2011 Shenzhen	Team

Pascale Lebecque (born 18 April 1989) is a French compound archer. She is the current World Archery number six in women's compound archery. The highest ranking she has reached is also the sixth position, which she reached for the last time in June 2012.

== Palmares ==
2008
10th, World University Championships, individual, Tainan
2009
6th, World Indoor Championships, individual, Rzeszów
17th, Summer Universiade, individual, Belgrade
(bronze) World Cup, women's team, Shanghai
8th, World Outdoor Championships, individual, Ulsan
10th, World Outdoor Championships, women's team, Ulsan
2010
6th, European Outdoor Championships, women's team, Rovereto
17th, European Outdoor Championships, individual, Rovereto
8th, World University Championships, mixed team, Shenzhen
9th, World University Championships, individual, Shenzhen
2011
(gold) World Cup, women's team, Poreč
(silver) EMAU Grand Prix, individual, Boé
(bronze) EMAU Grand Prix, women's team, Boé
(bronze) World Cup, mixed team, Antalya
(silver) World Outdoor Championships, individual, Turin
9th, World Outdoor Championships, women's team, Turin
(gold) Summer Universiade, women's team, Shenzhen
9th, Summer Universiade, individual, Shenzhen
(silver) World Cup, mixed team, Shanghai
2012
6th, World Indoor Championships, individual, Las Vegas
6th, Indoor World Cup Final, individual, Las Vegas
(gold) World Cup, mixed team, Shanghai
(bronze) European Outdoor Championships, women's team, Amsterdam
4th, European Outdoor Championships, individual, Amsterdam
5th, European Outdoor Championships, mixed team, Amsterdam
