= 2013 World Archery Championships – Men's team compound =

The men's team compound competition at the 2013 World Archery Championships took place on 29 September – 6 October 2013 in Belek, Turkey.

27 countries entered the full quota of 3 archers into the qualification round, thus becoming eligible for the team competition. The combined totals of the 3 archers from each country in the qualification round were added together, and the 16 teams with the highest combined scores competed in the elimination rounds.

== Schedule ==
All times are local (UTC+02:00).

| Date | Time | Phase |
|---|---|---|
| 29 September | 14:00 | Official practice |
| 30 September | 09:30 | Qualification |
| 4 October | 09:30 | 1/8, QF, and SF Eliminations |
| 5 October | 11:45 | Medal matches |

== Qualification round ==
Pre-tournament world rankings ('WR') are taken from the 28 August 2013 World Archery Rankings.

Qualified for eliminations

| Rank | Nation | Name | Score | WR |
|---|---|---|---|---|
| 1 | United States | Jesse Broadwater; Reo Wilde; Braden Gellenthien | 2129 | 1 |
| 2 | Netherlands | Mike Schloesser; Peter Elzinga; Ruben Bleyendaal | 2120 | 6 |
| 3 | South Africa | DP Bierman; Patrick Roux; Gabriel Badenhorst | 2111 | 9 |
| 4 | France | Pierre-Julien Deloche; Dominique Genet; Sebastien Brasseur | 2108 | 3 |
| 5 | Mexico | Julio Ricardo Fierro; Mário Cardoso; Gerardo Alvarado | 2100 | 8 |
| 6 | Italy | Sergio Pagni; Mauro Bovini; Luigi Dragoni | 2099 | 5 |
| 7 | South Korea | Kim Jong-ho; Choi Yong-hee; Min Li-hong | 2098^{168;85} | 4 |
| 8 | Denmark | Martin Damsbo; Stephan Hansen; Patrick Laursen | 2098^{156;69} | 2 |
| 9 | Canada | Christopher Perkins; Dietmar Trillus; Andrew Fagan | 2096 | 16 |
| 10 | Russia | Alexander Dambaev; Chingese Rinchino; Zorigto Soizhinov | 2095 | 13 |
| 11 | United Kingdom | Adam Ravenscroft; Duncan Busby; Chris Bell | 2087 | 15 |
| 12 | Australia | Patrick Coghlan; Michael Brosnan; Guy Phillips | 2083 | 10 |
| 13 | India | Abhishek Verma; Rajat Chauhan; Sandeep Kumar | 2082 | 7 |
| 14 | Norway | Morten Bøe; Njaal Aamaas; Oddmund Tjentland | 2081 | 17 |
| 15 | Sweden | Magnus Carlsson; Morgan Lundin; Glenn Linsjo | 2077 | 26 |
| 16 | Turkey | Demir Elmaağaçlı; Barış Tandoğan; Evren Çağıran | 2074 | 23 |
| 17 | Belgium | Michael Cauwe; Renaud Domanski; Baptiste Scarceriaux | 2071 | 21 |
| 18 | Germany | Marcus Laube; Christian Raupach; Lars Klingner | 2062 | 12 |
| 19 | Colombia | Camilo Cardona; Daniel Muñoz; Juan Carlos Carrasquilla | 2057 | 19 |
| 20 | Austria | Gerald Bernhuber; Daniel Moser; Michael Matzner | 2054 | 35 |
| 21 | Finland | Mikko Juutilainen; Jere Forsberg; Pekka Loitokari | 2054 | 49 |
| 22 | Venezuela | Nelson Torres; Leandro Rojas; Eduardo González | 2049 | 11 |
| 23 | Thailand | Siwarut Wonglerstsuwan; Nitiphum Chatachot; Chanchai Wong | 2046 | 38 |
| 24 | Brazil | Marcelo Roriz Jr. Roberval dos Santos; Rogerio Ambrosio de Lima | 2044 | 39 |
| 25 | Slovakia | Matúš Ďurný Jr. Matúš Ďurný; Viktor Zeman | 2031 | 44 |
| 26 | Czech Republic | Vladimir Brada; Leoš Bartoš; Filip Reitmeier | 2017 | |
| 27 | Kazakhstan | Pavel Fisher; Murat Shotaev; Alexandr Murnov | 1999 | 41 |

== Elimination rounds ==
1st round
1 | United States | 202
16 | Turkey | 195
9 | Canada | 182
8 | Denmark | 215
5 | Mexico | 187
12 | Australia | 175
13 | India | 176
4 | France | 188
3 | South Africa | 191
14 | Norway | 158
11 | United Kingdom | 201
6 | Italy | 198
7 | South Korea | 179
10 | Russia | 196
15 | Sweden | 183
2 | Netherlands | 179

Quarterfinals
1 | United States | 154
8 | Denmark | 176
5 | Mexico | 160
4 | France | 174
3 | South Africa | 192
11 | United Kingdom | 164
10 | Russia | 151
15 | Sweden | 152

Semifinals
8 | Denmark | 210
4 | France | 185
3 | South Africa | 194
15 | Sweden | 160

Finals
8 | Denmark | 235
3 | South Africa | 230
Third place
4 | France | 232
15 | Sweden | 225
