= Xu Jing (archer) =

Chinese archer (born 1990)

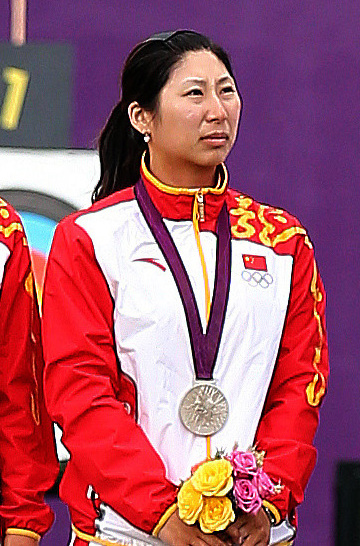

Personal information
- Born: September 6, 1990 (age 35) Shandong, China
- Height: 169 cm (5 ft 7 in)
- Weight: 70 kg (154 lb)
Medal record
Women's recurve archery
Representing China
Olympic Games
Silver medal – second place	2012 London	Team
World Championships
Silver medal – second place	2013 Belek	Individual
World Cup
Bronze medal – third place	2014 Lausanne	Individual
Asian Games
Silver medal – second place	2014 Incheon	Team
Asian Championships
Bronze medal – third place	2015 Bangkok	Team

Xu Jing (Chinese: 徐晶; pinyin: Xú Jīng; born September 6, 1990, in Shandong) is a Chinese archer. At the 2012 Summer Olympics she competed for her country in the Women's team event, winning a silver medal, and also in the individual event. In 2014 she became the world number one ranked archer.

== See also ==
- China at the 2012 Summer Olympics
