= 2013 World Archery Championships – Men's individual compound =

The men's individual compound competition at the 2013 World Archery Championships took place on 29 September – 6 October 2013 in Belek, Turkey.

102 archers from 44 countries entered the competition, with a maximum of three entries per country. All archers qualified for the 7-round knockout tournament, with the top 8 scores in qualifying receiving a bye to the third round. The reigning champion was Christopher Perkins of Canada.

== Schedule ==
All times are local (UTC+02:00).

Date	Time	Phase
29 September	14:00	Official practice
30 September	09:00	Qualification
2 October	16:45	1/48 and 1/24 Eliminations
3 October	09:30	1/16, 1/8, QF, and SF Eliminations
5 October	16:20	Medal matches

== Qualification round ==
Pre-tournament world rankings ('WR') are taken from the 28 August 2013 World Archery Rankings. The qualification round consisted of two sessions of 36 arrows at 50m, with equal scores separated by number of 10s, then number of X's and world ranking.

Bye to third round
Qualified for eliminations

Rank	Name	Nation	Score	WR
1	Jesse Broadwater	United States	713	15
2	Adam Ravenscroft	United Kingdom	710	88
3	Sergio Pagni	Italy	709	5
4	Reo Wilde	United States	709	1
5	Mike Schloesser	Netherlands	708	38
6	Peter Elzinga	Netherlands	708	9
7	Christopher Perkins	Canada	708	24
8	Braden Gellenthien	United States	707	2
9	Julio Ricardo Fierro	Mexico	706	14
10	Mario Vavro	Croatia	706	214
11	Pierre-Julien Deloche	France	705	3
12	Michael Cauwe	Belgium	705	32
13	Kim Jong-ho	South Korea	705	50
14	Dominique Genet	France	705	7
15	DP Bierman	South Africa	705	171
16	Alexander Dambaev	Russia	704	26
17	Morten Bøe	Norway	704	18
18	Ruben Bleyendaal	Netherlands	704	36
19	Martin Damsbo	Denmark	704	4
20	Choi Yong-hee	South Korea	703	13
21	Patrick Roux	South Africa	703	94
22	Gabriel Badenhorst	South Africa	703	17
23	Roberto Hernández	El Salvador	701	8
24	Stephan Hansen	Denmark	701	
25	Mauro Bovini	Italy	700	60
26	Magnus Carlsson	Sweden	700	210
27	Vladas Šigauskas	Lithuania	700	68
28	Mário Cardoso	Mexico	700	45
29	Chingese Rinchino	Russia	699	78
30	Patrick Coghlan	Australia	699	58
31	Abhishek Verma	India	698	80
32	Sebastien Brasseur	France	698	183
33	Dietmar Trillus	Canada	697	10
34	Demir Elmaağaçlı	Turkey	697	
35	Petro Turunin	Ukraine	696	
36	Patrizio Hofer	Switzerland	695	27
37	Michael Brosnan	Australia	695	33
38	Marcus Laube	Germany	694	25
39	Camilo Cardona	Colombia	694	53
40	Njaal Aamaas	Norway	694	29
41	Pavel Fisher	Kazakhstan	694	174
42	Shaun Teasdale	New Zealand	694	65
43	Gerardo Alvarado	Mexico	694	23
44	Morgan Lundin	Sweden	694	95
45	Patrick Laursen	Denmark	693	6
46	Rajat Chauhan	India	693	19
47	Evert Ressar	Estonia	692	132
48	Zorigto Soizhinov	Russia	692	297
49	Duncan Busby	United Kingdom	691	56
50	Gerald Bernhuber	Austria	691	
51	Mikko Juutilainen	Finland	691	102
52	Marcelo Roriz Jr.	Brazil	691	47
53	Yuta Yamamoto	Japan	691	
54	Eshaq Ibrahim	Iraq	691	448
55	Andrew Fagan	Canada	691	123
56	Sandeep Kumar	India	691	114
57	Min Li-hong	South Korea	690	22
58	Luigi Dragoni	Italy	690	54
59	Alberto Blázquez	Spain	689	216
60	Guy Phillips	Australia	689	116
61	Barış Tandoğan	Turkey	689	
62	Siwarut Wonglerstsuwan	Thailand	689	139
63	Roberval dos Santos	Brazil	688	90
64	Kevin Burri	Switzerland	688	
65	Evren Çağıran	Turkey	688	
66	Majid Gheidi	Iran	687	63
67	Renaud Domanski	Belgium	687	149
68	Darrel Wilson	Ireland	687	
69	Christian Raupach	Germany	687	
70	Chris Bell	United Kingdom	686	
71	Matúš Ďurný Jr.	Slovakia	686	142
72	Nelson Torres	Venezuela	686	57
73	Daniel Muñoz	Colombia	686	413
74	Jere Forsberg	Finland	685	
75	Danilo Miokovic	Serbia	684	76
76	Leandro Rojas	Venezuela	684	43
77	Sergio Martínez Garrido	Spain	684	
78	Oddmund Tjentland	Norway	683	157
79	Glenn Linsjo	Sweden	683	
80	Nitiphum Chatachot	Thailand	683	319
81	Daniel Moser	Austria	682	55
82	Varga Akos	Serbia	682	
83	Oleg Lavrentiev	Belarus	682	
84	Michael Matzner	Austria	681	64
85	Lars Klingner	Germany	681	
86	Eduardo González	Venezuela	679	35
87	Baptiste Scarceriaux	Belgium	679	
88	Vladimir Brada	Czech Republic	678	140
89	Juan Carlos Carrasquilla	Colombia	677	
90	Pekka Loitokari	Finland	676	
91	Chanchai Wong	Thailand	674	130
92	Matúš Ďurný	Slovakia	674	416
93	Viktor Zeman	Slovakia	671	435
94	Leoš Bartoš	Czech Republic	671	
95	Filip Reitmeier	Czech Republic	668	131
96	Rogerio Ambrosio de Lima	Brazil	665	231
97	Murat Shotaev	Kazakhstan	660	
98	Jonas Šerna	Lithuania	657	
99	Juan Manuel Pérez	Argentina	656	
100	Alexandr Murnov	Kazakhstan	645	
101	Ziaul Hoq Zia	Bangladesh	636	
102	Krzysztof Gorczyca	Poland	633	353

== Elimination rounds ==
=== Top half ===
==== Section 1 ====
1st round
1	(United States) Jesse Broadwater
Bye
33	(Canada) Dietmar Trillus	146
80	(Thailand) Nitiphum Chatachot	143
81	(Austria) Daniel Moser	140
32	(France) Sebastien Brasseur	143
17	(Norway) Morten Bøe	148
96	(Brazil) Rogerio Ambrosio de Lima	144
65	(Turkey) Evren Çağıran	142
48	(Russia) Zorigto Soizhinov	145
49	(United Kingdom) Duncan Busby	139
64	(Switzerland) Kevin Burri	141
97	(Kazakhstan) Murat Shotaev	138
16	(Russia) Alexander Dambaev	147

2nd round
1	(United States) Jesse Broadwater
Bye
33	(Canada) Dietmar Trillus	141
32	(France) Sebastien Brasseur	144
17	(Norway) Morten Bøe	132
48	(Russia) Zorigto Soizhinov	145
64	(Switzerland) Kevin Burri	135
16	(Russia) Alexander Dambaev	143

3rd round
1	(United States) Jesse Broadwater	139
32	(France) Sebastien Brasseur	131
48	(Russia) Zorigto Soizhinov	129
16	(Russia) Alexander Dambaev	138

4th round
1	(United States) Jesse Broadwater	131
16	(Russia) Alexander Dambaev	137

==== Section 2 ====
1st round
9	(Mexico) Julio Ricardo Fierro
Bye
57	(South Korea) Min Li-hong	145^{10}
56	(India) Sandeep Kumar	145^{9}
41	(Kazakhstan) Pavel Fisher	141
72	(Venezuela) Nelson Torres	140
89	(Colombia) Juan Carlos Carrasquilla	140
24	(Denmark) Stephan Hansen	147
25	(Italy) Mauro Bovini	147
88	(Czech Republic) Vladimir Brada	142
73	(Colombia) Daniel Muñoz	146
40	(Norway) Njaal Aamaas	145
8	(United States) Braden Gellenthien
Bye

2nd round
9	(Mexico) Julio Ricardo Fierro	144
57	(South Korea) Min Li-hong	137
41	(Kazakhstan) Pavel Fisher	140
24	(Denmark) Stephan Hansen	145
25	(Italy) Mauro Bovini	135
73	(Colombia) Daniel Muñoz	142
8	(United States) Braden Gellenthien
Bye

3rd round
9	(Mexico) Julio Ricardo Fierro	137
24	(Denmark) Stephan Hansen	138
73	(Colombia) Daniel Muñoz	113
8	(United States) Braden Gellenthien	117

4th round
24	(Denmark) Stephan Hansen	127
8	(United States) Braden Gellenthien	128

==== Section 3 ====
1st round
5	(Netherlands) Mike Schloesser
Bye
37	(Australia) Michael Brosnan	146
76	(Venezuela) Leandro Rojas	148
85	(Germany) Lars Klingner	139
28	(Mexico) Mario Cardoso	143
21	(South Africa) Patrick Roux	149
92	(Slovakia) Matúš Ďurný	137
69	(Germany) Christian Raupach	146
44	(Sweden) Morgan Lundin	143
53	(Japan) Yuta Yamamoto	145
60	(Australia) Guy Phillips	139
101	(Bangladesh) Ziaul Hoq Zia	134
12	(Belgium) Michael Cauwe	149

2nd round
5	(Netherlands) Mike Schloesser
Bye
76	(Venezuela) Leandro Rojas	140
28	(Mexico) Mario Cardoso
21	(South Africa) Patrick Roux	146
69	(Germany) Christian Raupach	141
53	(Japan) Yuta Yamamoto	139
12	(Belgium) Michael Cauwe	140

3rd round
5	(Netherlands) Mike Schloesser	139
76	(Venezuela) Leandro Rojas	138
21	(South Africa) Patrick Roux	141
12	(Belgium) Michael Cauwe	137

4th round
5	(Netherlands) Mike Schloesser	144
21	(South Africa) Patrick Roux	135

==== Section 4 ====
1st round
13	(South Korea) Kim Jong-ho	145
100	(Kazakhstan) Alexandr Murnov	135
61	(Turkey) Barış Tandoğan	144
52	(Brazil) Marcelo Roriz Jr.	146
45	(Denmark) Patrick Laursen	145
68	(Republic of Ireland) Darrel Wilson	143
93	(Slovakia) Viktor Zeman	134
20	(South Korea) Choi Yong-hee	146
29	(Russia) Chingese Rinchino	135
84	(Austria) Michael Matzner	146
77	(Spain) Sergio Martinez Garrido	143
36	(Switzerland) Patrizio Hofer	149
4	(United States) Reo Wilde
Bye

2nd round
13	(South Korea) Kim Jong-ho	138
52	(Brazil) Marcelo Roriz Jr.	144
45	(Denmark) Patrick Laursen	145
20	(South Korea) Choi Yong-hee	144
84	(Austria) Michael Matzner	138^{10}
36	(Switzerland) Patrizio Hofer	138^{9}
4	(United States) Reo Wilde
Bye

3rd round
52	(Brazil) Marcelo Roriz Jr.	128
45	(Denmark) Patrick Laursen	138
84	(Austria) Michael Matzner	136
4	(United States) Reo Wilde	131

4th round
45	(Denmark) Patrick Laursen	125
84	(Austria) Michael Matzner	136

=== Bottom half ===
==== Section 5 ====
1st round
3	(Italy) Sergio Pagni
Bye
35	(Ukraine) Petro Turunin	135
78	(Norway) Oddmund Tjentland	139
83	(Belarus) Oleg Lavrentiev	140
30	(Australia) Patrick Coghlan	143
19	(Denmark) Martin Damsbo	145
94	(Czech Republic) Leos Bartos	141
67	(Belgium) Renaud Domanski	146
46	(India) Rajat Chauhan	147
51	(Finland) Mikko Juutilainen	147
62	(Thailand) Siwarut Wonglerstsuwan	141
99	(Argentina) Juan Manuel Pérez	135
14	(France) Dominique Genet	145

2nd round
3	(Italy) Sergio Pagni
Bye
78	(Norway) Oddmund Tjentland	130
30	(Australia) Patrick Coghlan	142
19	(Denmark) Martin Damsbo	142
46	(India) Rajat Chauhan	143
51	(Finland) Mikko Juutilainen	140
14	(France) Dominique Genet	141

3rd round
3	(Italy) Sergio Pagni	136
30	(Australia) Patrick Coghlan	135
46	(India) Rajat Chauhan	139
14	(France) Dominique Genet	137

4th round
3	(Italy) Sergio Pagni	136
46	(India) Rajat Chauhan	137

==== Section 6 ====
1st round
11	(France) Pierre-Julien Deloche	149
102	(Poland) Krzysztof Gorczyca	133
59	(Spain) Alberto Blázquez	149
54	(Iraq) Eshaq Ibrahim	144
43	(Mexico) Gerardo Alvarado	147
70	(United Kingdom) Chris Bell	142
91	(Thailand) Chanchai Wong	138
22	(South Africa) Gabriel Badenhorst	147
27	(Lithuania) Vladas Šigauskas	146^{9*}
86	(Venezuela) Eduardo González	146^{9}
75	(Serbia) Danilo Miokovic	142
38	(Germany) Marcus Laube	143
6	(Netherlands) Peter Elzinga
Bye

2nd round
11	(France) Pierre-Julien Deloche	140
59	(Spain) Alberto Blázquez	134
43	(Mexico) Gerardo Alvarado	139^{10*}
22	(South Africa) Gabriel Badenhorst	139^{10}
27	(Lithuania) Vladas Šigauskas	131
38	(Germany) Marcus Laube	136
6	(Netherlands) Peter Elzinga
Bye

3rd round
11	(France) Pierre-Julien Deloche	133
43	(Mexico) Gerardo Alvarado	129
38	(Germany) Marcus Laube	133
6	(Netherlands) Peter Elzinga	128

4th round
11	(France) Pierre-Julien Deloche	138
38	(Germany) Marcus Laube	131

==== Section 7 ====
1st round
7	(Canada) Christopher Perkins
Bye
39	(Colombia) Camilo Cardona	145
74	(Finland) Jere Forsberg	142
87	(Belgium) Baptiste Scarceriaux	143
26	(Sweden) Magnus Carlsson	146
23	(El Salvador) Roberto Hernández	146
90	(Finland) Pekka Loitokari	141
71	(Slovakia) Matúš Ďurný Jr.	142
42	(New Zealand) Shaun Teasdale	146
55	(Canada) Andrew Fagan	145
58	(Italy) Luigi Dragoni	144
10	(Croatia) Mario Vavro
Bye

2nd round
7	(Canada) Christopher Perkins
Bye
39	(Colombia) Camilo Cardona	140^{10}
26	(Sweden) Magnus Carlsson	140^{10*}
23	(El Salvador) Roberto Hernández	133^{9}
42	(New Zealand) Shaun Teasdale	133^{10}
55	(Canada) Andrew Fagan	129
10	(Croatia) Mario Vavro	140

3rd round
7	(Canada) Christopher Perkins	134
26	(Sweden) Magnus Carlsson	133
42	(New Zealand) Shaun Teasdale	121
10	(Croatia) Mario Vavro	126

4th round
7	(Canada) Christopher Perkins	134
10	(Croatia) Mario Vavro	118

==== Section 8 ====
1st round
15	(South Africa) DP Bierman	145
98	(Lithuania) Jonas Serna	138
63	(Brazil) Roberval dos Santos	144
50	(Austria) Gerald Bernhuber	141
47	(Estonia) Evert Ressar	145
66	(Iran) Majid Gheidi	143
95	(Czech Republic) Filip Reitmeier	141
18	(Netherlands) Ruben Bleyendaal	147
31	(India) Abhishek Verma	147
82	(Serbia) Varga Akos	140
79	(Sweden) Glenn Linsjo	143
34	(Turkey) Demir Elmaağaçlı	147
2	(United Kingdom) Adam Ravenscroft
Bye

2nd round
15	(South Africa) DP Bierman	134
63	(Brazil) Roberval dos Santos	137
47	(Estonia) Evert Ressar	144
18	(Netherlands) Ruben Bleyendaal	141
31	(India) Abhishek Verma	139
34	(Turkey) Demir Elmaağaçlı	133
2	(United Kingdom) Adam Ravenscroft
Bye

3rd round
63	(Brazil) Roberval dos Santos	138
47	(Estonia) Evert Ressar	136
31	(India) Abhishek Verma	134
2	(United Kingdom) Adam Ravenscroft	139

4th round
63	(Brazil) Roberval dos Santos	138
2	(United Kingdom) Adam Ravenscroft	133

== Finals ==
Quarterfinals
16	(Russia) Alexander Dambaev	132
8	(United States) Braden Gellenthien	127
5	(Netherlands) Mike Schloesser	139
84	(Austria) Michael Matzner	132
46	(India) Rajat Chauhan	126
11	(France) Pierre-Julien Deloche	129
7	(Canada) Christopher Perkins	130
63	(Brazil) Roberval dos Santos	133

Semifinals
16	(Russia) Alexander Dambaev	125
5	(Netherlands) Mike Schloesser	133
11	(France) Pierre-Julien Deloche	130
63	(Brazil) Roberval dos Santos	108

Finals
5	(Netherlands) Mike Schloesser	146
11	(France) Pierre-Julien Deloche	141
Third place
16	(Russia) Alexander Dambaev	142
63	(Brazil) Roberval dos Santos	139
