= 2015 World Archery Championships – Men's individual compound =

Men's archery tournament

The men's individual compound competition at the 2015 World Archery Championships took place from 27 July to 1 August 2015 in Copenhagen, Denmark.

== Schedule ==
All times are local (UTC+01:00).

Date	Time	Phase
26 July	tbc	Official practice
27 July	tbc	Qualification
29 July	tbc	1/48 and 1/24 Eliminations
30 July	tbc	1/16, 1/8, QF, and SF Eliminations
1 August	15:00	Medal matches

== Qualification round ==
Pre-tournament world rankings ('WR') are taken from the 18 July 2015 World Archery Rankings.

Bye to third round
Qualified for eliminations

Rank	Name	Nation	Score	10	X	WR
1	Abhishek Verma	India	697	49	17	16
2	Kim Jong-ho	South Korea	696	51	18	12
3	Braden Gellenthien	United States	694	47	20	11
4	Mike Schloesser	Netherlands	693	46	27	2
5	Mario Vavro	Croatia	690	44	15	32
6	Kevin Tataryn	Canada	689	44	21	n/a
7	Martin Damsbo	Denmark	689	41	15	8
8	Demir Elmaağaçlı	Turkey	688	46	18	13
9	Leandro Rojas	Venezuela	688	44	19	30
10	Camilo Cardona	Colombia	687	45	14	53
11	Christopher Perkins	Canada	687	42	12	90
12	Patrick Roux	South Africa	686	43	16	43
13	Stephan Hansen	Denmark	686	43	11	26
14	Jorge Jiménez	El Salvador	686	42	19	49
15	Alexander Dambaev	Russia	685	40	11	7
16	Albertus Cornelius	South Africa	684	40	17	101
17	Julio Ricardo Fierro	Mexico	683	43	18	21
18	Esmaeil Ebadi	Iran	683	40	14	24
19	Robert Timms	Australia	682	44	16	47
20	Morten Bøe	Norway	682	41	14	117
21	Alberto Blazquez	Spain	682	40	16	55
22	Samet Can Yakali	Turkey	682	38	16	103
23	Choi Yong-hee	South Korea	681	40	14	23
24	Roberto Hernández	El Salvador	680	43	14	20
25	Gabriel Badenhorst	South Africa	680	36	16	70
26	Sergio Pagni	Italy	680	36	9	9
27	Nelson Torres	Venezuela	679	36	14	61
28	Nguyen Tien Cuong	Vietnam	678	38	14	31
29	Peter Elzinga	Netherlands	678	38	11	6
30	Rajat Chauhan	India	678	37	16	14
31	Carl-Henrik Gidenskold	Sweden	678	36	16	n/a
32	Kim Tae-yoon	South Korea	678	36	9	72
33	Adam Ravenscroft	United Kingdom	678	34	16	50
34	Scott Brice	Australia	677	37	14	157
35	Viktor Orosz	Hungary	677	35	13	n/a
36	Rodolfo Gonzalez	Mexico	677	35	12	42
37	Ruben Bleyendaal	Netherlands	677	35	12	65
38	Michael Matzner	Austria	676	40	16	35
39	Amir Kazempour	Iran	676	38	14	41
40	Marcus Laube	Germany	676	37	10	27
41	Federico Pagnoni	Italy	676	35	9	44
42	Majid Gheidi	Iran	675	42	18	51
43	Patrick Coghlan	Australia	675	37	14	74
44	Evren Çağıran	Turkey	675	34	13	48
45	Roman Haefelfinger	Switzerland	675	30	9	225
46	Kawal Preet Singh	India	675	18	6	95
47	Daniel Muñoz	Colombia	674	34	11	17
48	Luigi Dragoni	Italy	674	32	9	56
49	Alex Wifler	United States	673	34	12	189
50	Eduardo Gonzalez	Venezuela	673	31	14	38
51	Sebastian Hamdorf	Germany	672	39	21	n/a
52	Duncan Busby	United Kingdom	672	36	17	62
53	Shaun Teasdale	New Zealand	672	35	15	52
54	Jan Wojtas	Poland	672	34	21	112
55	Marcelo Roriz Jr.	Brazil	671	38	13	22
56	Dominique Genet	France	670	37	12	10
57	Viktor Kalashnikov	Russia	670	31	12	75
58	Dejan Sitar	Slovenia	670	31	9	40
59	Njaal Aamaas	Norway	669	34	13	45
60	Domagoj Buden	Croatia	669	30	10	80
61	Wolfgang Wiener	Austria	669	29	12	n/a
62	Pierre-Julien Deloche	France	668	35	12	1
63	Yuta Yamamoto	Japan	668	35	7	366
64	Kai Knechtel	Germany	668	34	7	268
65	Patrick Laursen	Denmark	668	25	10	28
66	Rigoberto Hernandez	El Salvador	666	30	9	88
67	Julien Depoitier	Belgium	666	28	11	77
68	Sebastien Peineau	France	665	32	10	5
69	Mikhail Filatov	Russia	665	32	10	447
70	Pavel Fisher	Kazakhstan	665	30	10	59
71	Dietmar Trillus	Canada	665	28	7	46
72	Reginald Kools	Belgium	664	35	9	n/a
73	Mario Cardoso	Mexico	664	31	11	19
74	Mikko Juutilainen	Finland	664	30	8	89
75	Jere Forsberg	Finland	663	30	8	562
76	Magnus Carlsson	Sweden	663	27	8	147
77	Nico Wiener	Austria	663	26	9	308
78	Kuswantoro	Indonesia	662	31	10	211
79	Ahmed Fakhry	Egypt	662	31	9	135
80	Kevin Burri	Switzerland	662	30	9	87
81	Roberval dos Santos	Brazil	662	27	9	18
82	Roman Vinogradov	Ukraine	660	32	9	308
83	Gudjon Einarsson	Iceland	660	28	12	n/a
84	Vitor-Hugo Ferreira	Portugal	660	27	10	n/a
85	Renaud Domanski	Belgium	660	22	7	39
86	Morgan Lundin	Sweden	659	31	14	189
87	Igor Kardash	Ukraine	659	29	11	239
88	Oleg Krasylnykov	Ukraine	659	26	6	n/a
89	Athanasios Kostopoulos	Greece	659	24	10	239
90	Darrel Wilson	Ireland	657	30	10	235
91	Jogvan Niclasen	Faroe Islands	657	29	11	n/a
92	Vladimir Brada	Czech Republic	656	30	10	562
93	Filip Reitmeier	Czech Republic	656	28	8	177
94	Mark Rudd	United Kingdom	656	28	5	321
95	Damjan Majer	Slovenia	655	29	10	n/a
96	Stavros Koumertas	Greece	654	25	12	208
97	Vilius Svedas	Lithuania	654	23	11	631
98	Sebastián Arenas	Colombia	648	23	9	n/a
99	Kaj Johannesen	Faroe Islands	647	22	7	n/a
100	Khaled Elsaid	Egypt	646	20	4	267
101	Muidh Rajah H Albaqami	Saudi Arabia	646	19	7	124
102	Andrey Lobanov	Kazakhstan	645	24	9	423
103	Juho Seppo Antero Hautamaeki	Finland	644	21	6	321
104	Fabrizio Belloni	San Marino	644	19	4	n/a
105	Claudio C. Contrucci	Brazil	639	23	10	225
106	Michal Sivak	Czech Republic	638	16	7	239
107	Abdulaziz Ahmed A Alobadi	Qatar	636	16	4	115
108	Gudmundur Orn Gudjonsson	Iceland	627	18	8	n/a
109	Sumon Kumar Das	Bangladesh	624	21	4	608
110	Ram Krishna Saha	Bangladesh	110	17	5	n/a
111	Fanny Andiyanto	Indonesia	620	13	5	n/a
112	Stanislav Troyepolskiy	Israel	620	7	3	n/a
113	Md Aliul Islam	Bangladesh	608	10	3	767
114	Daniel Sigurdsson	Iceland	595	13	8	n/a
115	Reo Wilde	United States	591	42	21	3
116	Christos Aerikos	Greece	565	29	7	308
117	Mads Haugseth	Norway	550	27	11	132
118	Mai Xuan Duc	Vietnam	315	9	4	174
119	Nguyen Tuan Anh	Vietnam	267	8	4	187

== Elimination rounds ==
=== Top half ===
==== Section 1 ====
1st round
1	(India) Abhishek Verma
Bye
33	(United Kingdom) Adam Ravenscroft	142
80	(Switzerland) Kevin Burri	140
81	(Brazil) Roberval dos Santos	141
32	(South Korea) Kim Tae-yoon	143
17	(Mexico) Julio Ricardo Fierro	136^{10*}
96	(Greece) Stavros Koumertas	136^{10}
65	(Denmark) Patrick Laursen	145
48	(Italy) Luigi Dragoni	137
49	(United States) Alex Wolfgang Wifler	142
64	(Germany) Kai Knechtel	137
97	(Lithuania) Vilius Svedas	136
16	(South Africa) Albertus Cornelius	142

2nd round
1	(India) Abhishek Verma
Bye
33	(Germany) Adam Ravenscroft	142
32	(South Korea) Kim Tae-yoon	136
17	(Mexico) Julio Ricardo Fierro	139
65	(Denmark) Patrick Laursen	141
49	(United States) Alex Wolfgang Wifler	139
16	(South Africa) Albertus Cornelius	140

3rd round
1	(India) Abhishek Verma	146^{9}
33	(United Kingdom) Adam Ravenscroft	146^{10}
65	(Denmark) Patrick Laursen	144^{10}
16	(South Africa) Albertus Cornelius	144^{10*}

4th round
33	(United Kingdom) Adam Ravenscroft	145
16	(South Africa) Albertus Cornelius	142

==== Section 2 ====
1st round
9	(Venezuela) Leandro Rojas	139
104	(San Marino) Fabrizio Belloni	136
57	(Russia) Viktor Kalashnikov	145
56	(France) Dominique Genet	138
41	(Italy) Federico Pagnoni	141
72	(Belgium) Reginald Kools	132
89	(Greece) Athanasios Kostopoulos	130
24	(El Salvador) Roberto Hernández	146
25	(South Africa) Gabriel Badenhorst	143
88	(Ukraine) Oleg Krasylnykov	142
73	(Mexico) Mario Cardoso	142
40	(Germany) Marcus Laube	140
8	(Turkey) Demir Elmaağaçlı
Bye

2nd round
9	(Venezuela) Leandro Rojas	132
57	(Russia) Viktor Kalashnikov	142
41	(Italy) Federico Pagnoni	140^{9}
24	(El Salvador) Roberto Hernández	140^{9*}
25	(South Africa) Gabriel Badenhorst	143
73	(Mexico) Mario Cardoso	141
8	(Turkey) Demir Elmaağaçlı
Bye

3rd round
57	(Russia) Viktor Kalashnikov	145
24	(El Salvador) Roberto Hernández	147
25	(South Africa) Gabriel Badenhorst	142
8	(Turkey) Demir Elmaağaçlı	146

4th round
24	(El Salvador) Roberto Hernández	146
8	(Turkey) Demir Elmaağaçlı	149

==== Section 3 ====
1st round
5	(Croatia) Mario Vavro
Bye
37	(Netherlands) Ruben Bleyendaal	143
76	(Sweden) Magnus Carlsson	136
85	(Belgium) Renaud Domanski	137
28	(Vietnam) Nguyen Tien Cuong	140
21	(Spain) Alberto Blazquez	138
92	(Czech Republic) Vladimir Brada	134
69	(Russia) Mikhail Filatov	138
44	(Turkey) Evren Çağıran	133
53	(New Zealand) Shaun Teasdale	140
60	(Croatia) Domagoj Buden	144
101	(Saudi Arabia) Muidh Rajah H Albaqami	135
12	(South Africa) Patrick Roux	144

2nd round
5	(Croatia) Mario Vavro
Bye
37	(Netherlands) Ruben Bleyendaal	137
28	(Vietnam) Nguyen Tien Cuong	135
21	(Spain) Alberto Blazquez	138
69	(Russia) Mikhail Filatov	144
60	(Croatia) Domagoj Buden	140
12	(South Africa) Patrick Roux	141

3rd round
5	(Croatia) Mario Vavro	145
37	(Netherlands) Ruben Bleyendaal	143
69	(Russia) Mikhail Filatov	143
12	(South Africa) Patrick Roux	148

4th round
5	(Croatia) Mario Vavro	145
12	(South Africa) Patrick Roux	142

==== Section 4 ====
1st round
13	(Denmark) Stephan Hansen	147
100	(Egypt) Khaled Elsaid	137
61	(Austria) Wolfgang Wiener	138
52	(United Kingdom) Duncan Busby	135
45	(Switzerland) Roman Haefelfinger	137
68	(France) Sebastien Peineau	133
93	(Czech Republic) Filip Reitmeier	130
20	(Norway) Morten Bøe	142
29	(Netherlands) Peter Elzinga	146
84	(Portugal) Vitor-Hugo Ferreira	138
77	(Austria) Nico Wiener	140
36	(Mexico) Rodolfo Gonzalez	141
4	(Netherlands) Mike Schloesser
Bye

2nd round
13	(Denmark) Stephan Hansen	146
61	(Austria) Wolfgang Wiener	142
45	(Switzerland) Roman Haefelfinger	133
20	(Norway) Morten Bøe	132
29	(Netherlands) Peter Elzinga	142
36	(Mexico) Rodolfo Gonzalez	131
4	(Netherlands) Mike Schloesser
Bye

3rd round
13	(Denmark) Stephan Hansen	146
45	(Switzerland) Roman Haefelfinger	144
29	(Netherlands) Peter Elzinga	145
4	(Netherlands) Mike Schloesser	148

4th round
13	(Denmark) Stephan Hansen	147^{10}
4	(Denmark) Mike Schloesser	147^{9}

=== Bottom half ===
==== Section 5 ====
1st round
3	(United States) Braden Gellenthien
Bye
35	(Hungary) Viktor Orosz	147
78	(Indonesia) Kuswantoro	141
83	(Iceland) Gudjon Einarsson	139
30	(India) Rajat Chauhan	144
19	(Australia) Robert Timms	145
94	(United Kingdom) Mark Rudd	139
67	(Belgium) Julien Depoitier	133
46	(India) Kawal Preet Singh	147
51	(Germany) Sebastian Hamdorf	142
62	(France) Pierre-Julien Deloche	135
99	(Faroe Islands) Kaj Johannesen	129
14	(El Salvador) Jorge Jiménez	140

2nd round
3	(United States) Braden Gellenthien
Bye
35	(Hungary) Viktor Orosz	142^{8*}
30	(India) Rajat Chauhan	142^{8*}
19	(Australia) Robert Timms	139
46	(India) Kawal Preet Singh	136
51	(Germany) Sebastian Hamdorf	135
14	(El Salvador) Jorge Jiménez	137

3rd round
3	(United States) Braden Gellenthien	145
30	(India) Rajat Chauhan	149
19	(Australia) Robert Timms	146
14	(El Salvador) Jorge Jiménez	145

4th round
30	(India) Rajat Chauhan	145^{10*}
19	(Australia) Robert Timms	145^{10}

==== Section 6 ====
1st round
11	(Canada) Christopher Perkins	144
102	(Kazakhstan) Andrey Lobanov	139
59	(Norway) Njaal Aamaas	139
54	(Poland) Jan Wojtas	131
43	(Australia) Patrick Coghlan	142
70	(Kazakhstan) Pavel Fisher	140
91	(Faroe Islands) Jogvan Niclasen	143
22	(Turkey) Samet Can Yakali	135
27	(Venezuela) Nelson Torres	139
86	(Sweden) Morgan Lundin	137
75	(Finland) Jere Forsberg	120
38	(Austria) Michael Matzner	145
6	(Canada) Kevin Tataryn
Bye

2nd round
11	(Canada) Christopher Perkins	137
59	(Norway) Njaal Aamaas	136
43	(Australia) Patrick Coghlan	143
91	(Faroe Islands) Jogvan Niclasen	132
27	(Venezuela) Nelson Torres	136
38	(Austria) Michael Matzner	131
6	(Canada) Kevin Tataryn
Bye

3rd round
11	(Canada) Christopher Perkins	148
43	(Australia) Patrick Coghlan	144
27	(Venezuela) Nelson Torres	144
6	(Canada) Kevin Tataryn	148

4th round
11	(Canada) Christopher Perkins	146
6	(Canada) Kevin Tataryn	147

==== Section 7 ====
1st round
7	(Denmark) Martin Damsbo
Bye
39	(Iran) Amir Kazempour	144
74	(Finland) Mikko Juutilainen	140
87	(Ukraine) Igor Kardash	135
26	(Italy) Sergio Pagni	130
23	(South Korea) Choi Yong-hee	133
90	(Republic of Ireland) Darrel Wilson	142
71	(Canada) Dietmar Trillus	144
42	(Iran) Majid Gheidi	138
55	(Brazil) Marcelo Roriz Jr.	137
58	(Slovenia) Dejan Sitar	141
103	(Finland) Juho Seppo Antero Hautamaeki	131
10	(Colombia) Camilo Cardona	145

2nd round
7	(Denmark) Martin Damsbo
Bye
39	(Iran) Amir Kazempour	140
87	(Ukraine) Igor Kardash	129
90	(Republic of Ireland) Darrel Wilson	136
71	(Canada) Dietmar Trillus	143
58	(Slovenia) Dejan Sitar	137
10	(Colombia) Camilo Cardona	144

3rd round
7	(Denmark) Martin Damsbo	144
39	(Iran) Amir Kazempour	147
71	(Canada) Dietmar Trillus	143^{10}
10	(Colombia) Camilo Cardona	143^{10*}

4th round
39	(Iran) Amir Kazempour	146^{9}
10	(Colombia) Camilo Cardona	146^{10}

==== Section 8 ====
1st round
15	(Russia) Alexander Dambaev	144
98	(Colombia) Sebastián Arenas	131
63	(Japan) Yuta Yamamoto	142
50	(Venezuela) Eduardo Gonzalez	137
47	(Colombia) Daniel Muñoz	140
66	(El Salvador) Rigoberto Hernandez	137
95	(Slovenia) Damjan Majer	142
18	(Iran) Esmaeil Ebadi	141
31	(Sweden) Carl-Henrik Gidenskold	140
82	(Ukraine) Roman Vinogradov	137
79	(Egypt) Ahmed Fakhry	139
34	(Australia) Scott Brice	140
2	(South Korea) Kim Jong-ho
Bye

2nd round
15	(Russia) Alexander Dambaev	144
63	(Japan) Yuta Yamamoto	134
47	(Colombia) Daniel Muñoz	139
95	(Slovenia) Damjan Majer	132
31	(Sweden) Carl-Henrik Gidenskold	138^{10*}
34	(Australia) Scott Brice	138^{10}
2	(South Korea) Kim Jong-ho
Bye

3rd round
15	(Russia) Alexander Dambaev	143
47	(Colombia) Daniel Muñoz	145
31	(Sweden) Carl-Henrik Gidenskold	144^{9}
2	(South Korea) Kim Jong-ho	144^{10}

4th round
47	(Colombia) Daniel Muñoz	147
2	(South Korea) Kim Jong-ho	146

== Finals ==
Quarterfinals
33	(United Kingdom) Adam Ravenscroft	144
8	(Turkey) Demir Elmaağaçlı	143
5	(Croatia) Mario Vavro	143
13	(Denmark) Stephan Hansen	148
30	(India) Rajat Chauhan	146
6	(Canada) Kevin Tataryn	143
10	(Colombia) Camilo Cardona	145
47	(Colombia) Daniel Muñoz	141

Semifinals
33	(United Kingdom) Adam Ravenscroft	142
13	(Denmark) Stephan Hansen	148
30	(India) Rajat Chauhan	143
10	(Colombia) Camilo Cardona	138

Finals
13	(Denmark) Stephan Hansen	147
30	(India) Rajat Chauhan	143
Third place
33	(United Kingdom) Adam Ravenscroft	143
10	(Colombia) Camilo Cardona	141
