= 2011 World Archery Championships – Men's individual compound =

The men's individual compound competition at the 2011 World Archery Championships took place on 5–10 July 2011 in Turin, Italy. 132 archers competed in the qualification round on 4 July; the top 104 archers qualified for the knockout tournament on 7–8 July, with the semi-finals and finals on 9 July.

Fifth seed Christopher Perkins from Canada won the men's individual competition, defeating Jesse Broadwater in the final by one point.

== Seeds ==
The top eight scorers in the qualifying round were seeded, and received byes to the third round.

1. (United States) Reo Wilde (3rd place)
2. (United States) Jesse Broadwater (2nd place)
3. (Denmark) Martin Damsbo (3rd round)
4. (United States) Braden Gellenthien (Quarterfinal)
5. (Canada) Christopher Perkins (Champion)
6. (Italy) Sergio Pagni (Quarterfinal)
7. (Slovenia) Slavko Tursic (Quarterfinal)
8. (France) Dominique Genet (4th round)

== Draw ==
=== Top half ===
==== Section 1 ====
1st round
1	(United States) Reo Wilde
Bye
33	(Brazil) Marcelo Roriz Jr.	143
80	(France) Christophe Doussot	142
81	(Belgium) Luc Verdeyen	143
32	(New Zealand) Shaun Teasdale	145
17	(South Africa) Seppie Cilliers	140
96	(Hungary) Zsolt Balla	139
65	(Italy) Herian Boccali	143
48	(Switzerland) Parizio Hofer	142
49	(Sweden) Magnus Carlsson	139
64	(Netherlands) Mike Schloesser	146
97	(San Marino) Fabrizio Belloni	130
16	(Netherlands) Peter Elzinga	146

2nd round
1	(United States) Reo Wilde
Bye
33	(Brazil) Marcelo Roriz Jr.	145
32	(New Zealand) Shaun Teasdale	144
17	(South Africa) Seppie Cilliers	148
65	(Italy) Herian Boccali	145
64	(Netherlands) Mike Schloesser	145
16	(Netherlands) Peter Elzinga	146

3rd round
1	(United States) Reo Wilde	149
33	(Brazil) Marcelo Roriz Jr.	140
17	(South Africa) Seppie Cilliers	145^{10}
16	(Netherlands) Peter Elzinga	145^{8}

4th round
1	(United States) Reo Wilde	146
17	(South Africa) Seppie Cilliers	145

==== Section 2 ====
1st round
9	(France) Pierre-Julien Deloche	147
104	(Luxembourg) Gilles Seywert	145
57	(Netherlands) Sander Dolderman	142^{10}
56	(Hungary) Tibor Ondrik	142^{9}
41	(Belgium) Sam Kyritsoglou	139
72	(Turkey) Ali Davarci	142
89	(Philippines) Earl Benjamin Yap	139
24	(Spain) Carlos Paniagua	143
25	(South Korea) Kim Jong-ho	144
88	(Estonia) Magnus Mardu	136
73	(Turkey) Demir Elmaağaçlı	141
40	(Germany) Paul Titscher	146
8	(France) Dominique Genet
Bye

2nd round
9	(France) Pierre-Julien Deloche	144
57	(Netherlands) Sander Dolderman	140
72	(Turkey) Ali Davarci	140
24	(Spain) Carlos Paniagua	142
25	(South Korea) Kim Jong-ho	145
40	(Germany) Paul Titscher	143
8	(France) Dominique Genet
Bye

3rd round
9	(France) Pierre-Julien Deloche	146
24	(Spain) Carlos Paniagua	142
25	(South Korea) Kim Jong-ho	143
8	(France) Dominique Genet	147

4th round
9	(France) Pierre-Julien Deloche	145
8	(France) Dominique Genet	144

==== Section 3 ====
1st round
5	(Canada) Christopher Perkins
Bye
37	(United Kingdom) James Bingham	143
76	(Colombia) Manuel Jiménez	140
85	(Slovenia) David Rebec	141^{10}
28	(Russia) Danzan Khaludorov	141^{10*}
21	(South Korea) Choi Yong-hee	150
92	(Finland) Marko Jarvenpaa	147
69	(Vietnam) Nguyen Tien Cuong	144
44	(Lithuania) Vladas Šigauskas	136
53	(Belgium) Sven Mestdagh	143
60	(Puerto Rico) Daniel Castro	146
101	(Colombia) Daniel Muñoz	142
12	(United Kingdom) Duncan Busby	146

2nd round
5	(Canada) Christopher Perkins
Bye
37	(United Kingdom) James Bingham	145
28	(Russia) Danzan Khaludorov	143
21	(South Korea) Choi Yong-hee	149
69	(Vietnam) Nguyen Tien Cuong	144
60	(Puerto Rico) Daniel Castro	142
12	(United Kingdom) Duncan Busby	147

3rd round
5	(Canada) Christopher Perkins	148
37	(United Kingdom) James Bingham	141
21	(South Korea) Choi Yong-hee	149
12	(United Kingdom) Duncan Busby	143

4th round
5	(Canada) Christopher Perkins	148
21	(South Korea) Choi Yong-hee	146

==== Section 4 ====
1st round
13	(Canada) Dietmar Trillus	147
100	(Indonesia) Kuswantoro	141
61	(New Zealand) Stephen Clifton	137
52	(Portugal) Vitor-Hugo Ferreira	140
45	(Switzerland) Gregoire Fumeaux	145
68	(Australia) Bernard Andrews	140
93	(Singapore) Eugene Kok Fong Kwong	139
20	(El Salvador) Jorge Jiménez	145
29	(Russia) Alexander Dambaev	147
84	(Serbia) Ljubisa Urosevic	141
77	(Indonesia) I Gusti Nyoman Puruhito	139
36	(Denmark) Torben Johannessen	141
4	(United States) Braden Gellenthien
Bye

2nd round
13	(Canada) Dietmar Trillus	150
52	(Portugal) Vitor-Hugo Ferreira	139
45	(Switzerland) Gregoire Fumeaux	144^{10*}
20	(El Salvador) Jorge Jiménez	144^{10}
29	(Russia) Alexander Dambaev	145
36	(Denmark) Torben Johannessen	144
4	(United States) Braden Gellenthien
Bye

3rd round
13	(Canada) Dietmar Trillus	147
45	(Switzerland) Gregoire Fumeaux	143
29	(Russia) Alexander Dambaev	142
4	(United States) Braden Gellenthien	145

4th round
13	(Canada) Dietmar Trillus	147
4	(United States) Braden Gellenthien	148

=== Bottom half ===
==== Section 5 ====
1st round
3	(Denmark) Martin Damsbo
Bye
35	(Sweden) Carl-Henrik Gidenskold	148
78	(Spain) Sergio Martinez Garrido	145
83	(Czech Republic) Vladimir Brada	140
30	(South Korea) Min Li-hong	149
19	(South Africa) Gabriel Badenhorst	148
94	(San Marino) Giovanni Paolo Bonelli	142
67	(Italy) Pietro Greco	142^{10}
46	(Sweden) Anders Malm	142^{9}
51	(Spain) Francisco Javier Valverde	145
62	(Brazil) Rogerio Ambrosio de Lima	143
99	(Ukraine) Ihor Kardash	142
14	(Mexico) Gerardo Alvarado	141

2nd round
3	(Denmark) Martin Damsbo
Bye
35	(Sweden) Carl-Henrik Gidenskold	146
30	(South Korea) Min Li-hong	145
19	(South Africa) Gabriel Badenhorst	145^{10}
67	(Italy) Pietro Greco	145^{9}
51	(Spain) Francisco Javier Valverde	146
99	(Ukraine) Ihor Kardash	142

3rd round
3	(Denmark) Martin Damsbo	144
35	(Sweden) Carl-Henrik Gidenskold	146
19	(South Africa) Gabriel Badenhorst	144^{10}
51	(Spain) Francisco Javier Valverde	144^{9}

4th round
35	(Sweden) Carl-Henrik Gidenskold	146^{10}
19	(South Africa) Gabriel Badenhorst	146^{10*}

==== Section 6 ====
1st round
11	(Canada) Simon Rousseau	148
102	(Japan) Naoto Anji	142
59	(Colombia) Francisco Rojas	141
54	(Serbia) Danilo Miokovic	142
43	(Iran) Majid Gheydi	144^{10}
70	(Chinese Taipei) Kung Lin-hsiang	144^{10*}
91	(Czech Republic) Petr Verner	139
22	(Norway) Morten Bøe	147
27	(Venezuela) Gabriel Oliferow	144
86	(Indonesia) Hendra Setijawan	132
75	(Austria) Gerald Bernhuber	145
38	(El Salvador) Roberto Hernández	149
6	(Italy) Sergio Pagni
Bye

2nd round
11	(Canada) Simon Rousseau	144
54	(Serbia) Danilo Miokovic	146
70	(Chinese Taipei) Kung Lin-hsiang	141
22	(Norway) Morten Bøe	143
27	(Venezuela) Gabriel Oliferow	146
38	(El Salvador) Roberto Hernández	143
6	(Italy) Sergio Pagni
Bye

3rd round
54	(Serbia) Danilo Miokovic	142
22	(Norway) Morten Bøe	147
27	(Venezuela) Gabriel Oliferow	141
6	(Italy) Sergio Pagni	145

4th round
22	(Norway) Morten Bøe	146
6	(Italy) Sergio Pagni	147

==== Section 7 ====
1st round
7	(Slovenia) Slavko Tursic
Bye
39	(Slovenia) Dejan Sitar	146
74	(Austria) Daniel Moser	142
87	(South Africa) Lloyd Reeder	144
26	(Russia) Chingese Rinchino	143
23	(Denmark) Patrick Laursen	148
90	(Ukraine) Dmytro Lvovskyy	140
71	(Brazil) Alexandre Augusto Cesar	145
42	(Mexico) Angel Ramirez	141
55	(Venezuela) Leandro Rojas	146
58	(Germany) Marcus Laube	147
103	(Czech Republic) Filip Reitmeier	136
10	(Iran) Amir Kazempoor	147

2nd round
7	(Slovenia) Slavko Tursic
Bye
39	(Slovenia) Dejan Sitar	144^{9}
87	(South Africa) Lloyd Reeder	144^{10}
23	(Denmark) Patrick Laursen	144^{10}
71	(Brazil) Alexandre Augusto Cesar	144^{9}
58	(Germany) Marcus Laube	148
10	(Iran) Amir Kazempoor	142

3rd round
7	(Slovenia) Slavko Tursic	143
87	(South Africa) Lloyd Reeder	142
23	(Denmark) Patrick Laursen	146
58	(Germany) Marcus Laube	144

4th round
7	(Slovenia) Slavko Tursic	146
23	(Denmark) Patrick Laursen	144

==== Section 8 ====
1st round
15	(Finland) Jari Haavisto	143
98	(Greece) Athanasios Kostopoulos	140
63	(Finland) Timo Kivimaa	144
50	(Germany) Julian Scriba	143
47	(Venezuela) Eduardo Gonzalez	145
66	(Hungary) Laszlo Kis	144
95	(Norway) Thomas Sandberg	142
18	(Estonia) Evert Ressar	144
31	(Mexico) Julio Ricardo Fierro	142
82	(Slovakia) Matus Durny Jr.	144
79	(Austria) Michael Matzner	144
34	(United Kingdom) Christopher White	147
2	(United States) Jesse Broadwater
Bye

2nd round
15	(Finland) Jari Haavisto	147
63	(Finland) Timo Kivimaa	143
47	(Venezuela) Eduardo Gonzalez	144^{10}
18	(Estonia) Evert Ressar	144^{9}
82	(Slovakia) Matus Durny Jr.	140
34	(United Kingdom) Christopher White	142
2	(United States) Jesse Broadwater
Bye

3rd round
15	(Finland) Jari Haavisto	145
47	(Venezuela) Eduardo Gonzalez	144
34	(United Kingdom) Christopher White	145
2	(United States) Jesse Broadwater	148

4th round
15	(Finland) Jari Haavisto	146
2	(United States) Jesse Broadwater	150

== Finals ==
Quarterfinals
1	(United States) Reo Wilde	147
9	(France) Pierre-Julien Deloche	146
5	(Canada) Christopher Perkins	149^{10*}
4	(United States) Braden Gellenthien	149^{10}
19	(South Africa) Gabriel Badenhorst	149
6	(Italy) Sergio Pagni	146
7	(Slovenia) Slavko Tursic	142
2	(United States) Jesse Broadwater	147

Semifinals
1	(United States) Reo Wilde	147
5	(Canada) Christopher Perkins	148
19	(South Africa) Gabriel Badenhorst	145
2	(United States) Jesse Broadwater	147

Finals
5	(Canada) Christopher Perkins	148
2	(United States) Jesse Broadwater	147
Third place
1	(United States) Reo Wilde	149
19	(South Africa) Gabriel Badenhorst	142
