= 2015 World Archery Championships – Men's team compound =

Event at the 2015 World Archery Championship

The men's team compound competition at the 2015 World Archery Championships took place from 26 July to 1 August in Copenhagen, Denmark.

33 countries entered the full quota of 3 archers into the qualification round, thus becoming eligible for the team competition. The combined totals of the 3 archers from each country in the qualification round were added together, and the 16 teams with the highest combined scores competed in the elimination rounds.

Iran won the competition, marking their first gold medal at the World Archery Championships.

== Schedule ==
All times are local (UTC+01:00).

Date	Time	Phase
26 July	tbc	Official practice
27 July	tbc	Qualification
28 July	tbc	1/8, QF, and SF Eliminations
1 August	11:00	Medal matches

== Qualification round ==
Pre-tournament world rankings ('WR') are taken from the 18 July 2015 World Archery Rankings.

Qualified for eliminations

Rank	Nation	Name	Score	WR
1	South Korea	Choi Yong-hee; Kim Jong-ho; Kim Tae-yoon	2055	4
2	South Africa	Gabriel Badenhorst; Albertus Cornelius; Patrick Roux	2050	11
3	India	Rajat Chauhan; Kawal Preet Singh; Abhishek Verma	2050	8
4	Netherlands	Ruben Bleyendaal; Peter Elzinga; Mike Schloesser	2048	7
5	Turkey	Evren Çağıran; Demir Elmaağaçlı; Samet Can Yakali	2045	10
6	Denmark	Martin Damsbo; Stephan Hansen; Patrick Laursen	2043	1
7	Canada	Christopher Perkins; Kevin Tataryn; Dietmar Trillus	2041	32
8	Venezuela	Eduardo Gonzalez; Leandro Rojas; Nelson Torres	2040	30
9	Iran	Esmaeil Ebadi; Majid Gheidi; Amir Kazempour	2034	9
10	Australia	Scott Brice; Patrick Coghlan; Robert Timms	2034	12
11	El Salvador	Rigoberto Hernandez; Roberto Hernández; Jorge Jiménez	2032	28
12	Italy	Mauro Bovini; Luigi Dragoni; Sergio Pagni	2030	5
13	Mexico	Mario Cardoso; Julio Ricardo Fierro; Rodolfo Gonzalez	2024	3
14	Russia	Alexander Dambaev; Mikhail Filatov; Viktor Kalashnikov	2020	13
15	Germany	Sebastian Hamdorf; Kai Knechtel; Marcus Laube	2016	26
16	Colombia	Sebastián Arenas; Camilo Cardona; Daniel Muñoz	2009	16
17	Austria	Michael Matzner; Nico Wiener; Wolfgang Wiener	2008	58
18	United Kingdom	Duncan Busby; Adam Ravenscroft; Mark Rudd	2006	14
19	France	Pierre-Julien Deloche; Dominique Genet; Sebastien Peineau	2003	6
20	Sweden	Magnus Carlsson; Carl-Henrik Gidenskold; Morgan Lundin	2000	20
21	Belgium	Julien Depoitier; Renaud Domanski; Reginald Kools	1972	15
22	Ukraine	Igor Kardash; Oleg Krasylnykov; Roman Vinogradov	1978	48
23	Brazil	Claudio C. Contrucci; Roberval dos Santos; Marcelo Roriz Jr.	1972	25
24	Finland	Jere Forsberg; Juho Seppo Antero Hautamaeki; Mikko Juutilainen	1971	63
25	United States	Braden Gellenthien; Alex Wifler; Reo Wilde	1958	2
26	Czech Republic	Vladimir Brada; Filip Reitmeier; Michal Sivak	1950	63
27	Norway	Njaal Aamaas; Morten Bøe; Mads Haugseth	1901	19
28	Iceland	Gudjon Einarsson; Gudmundur Orn Gudjonsson; Daniel Sigurdsson	1882	n/a
29	Greece	Christos Aerikos; Athanasios Kostopoulos; Stavros Koumertas	1878	49
30	Bangladesh	Sumon Kumar Das; Md Aliul Islam; Ram Krishna Saha	1853	63
31	Vietnam	Mai Xuan Duc; Nguyen Tien Cuong; Nguyen Tuan Anh	1260	22

== Elimination rounds ==
1st round
1	South Korea	228
16	Colombia	233
9	Iran	228
8	Venezuela	227
5	Turkey	225
12	Italy	230
13	Mexico	227
4	Netherlands	229
3	India	226
14	Russia	112
11	El Salvador	222
6	Denmark	228
7	Canada	230
10	Australia	227
15	Germany	227^{27}
2	South Africa	227^{27*}

Quarterfinals
16	Colombia	227
9	Iran	228
12	Italy	227^{30*}
4	Netherlands	227^{30}
3	India	224
6	Denmark	232
7	Canada	231^{28*}
2	South Africa	231^{28}

Semifinals
9	Iran	226
12	Italy	224
6	Denmark	227
7	Canada	231

Finals
9	Iran	226^{30}
7	Canada	226^{29}
Third place
12	Italy	231
6	Denmark	233
