= Archery at the 2010 Commonwealth Games – Men's compound individual =

The men's compound recurve archery event at the 2010 Commonwealth Games was part of the archery programme and took place at the Yamuna Sports Complex.

== Ranking Round ==
Rank	Archer	Score
1	Septimus Cilliers (RSA)	704
2	Duncan Busby (ENG)	703
3	Stephen Clifton (NZL)	702
4	Tapani Kalmaru (WAL)	701
5	Liam Grimwood (ENG)	700
6	Shaun Teasdale (NZL)	699
7	Andrew Fagan (CAN)	699
8	Jacobus de Wet (RSA)	699
9	Patrick Coghlan (AUS)	698
10	Robert Timms (AUS)	697
11	Michael Schleppe (CAN)	696
12	Christopher White (ENG)	696
13	Nico Benade (RSA)	695
14	Johannes Grobler (NAM)	694
15	Anthony Waddick (NZL)	694
16	Alistair Whittingham (SCO)	693
17	Jignas Chittibomma (IND)	693
18	Chinna Srither (IND)	691
19	Stuart Wilson (NIR)	690
20	Clint Freeman (AUS)	688
21	Ritul Chatterjee (IND)	685
22	Kyle Dods (SCO)	684
23	Nathan Cameron (CAN)	684
24	Dirk Bockmuhl (NAM)	683

Rank	Archer	Score
25	Benjamin van Wyk (NAM)	683
26	George Vire (TRI)	683
27	Abul Mamun (BAN)	681
28	Muhammad Mahazan (MAS)	680
29	Robert Hall (NIR)	679
30	Darrel Wilson (NIR)	677
31	Hon Lang (MAS)	677
32	Hasmath Ali (TRI)	677
33	Geraint Thomas (WAL)	676
34	Mohd Ashah (MAS)	673
35	Jonathan Snell (NFI)	672
36	Rakesh Sookoo (TRI)	671
37	Timothy Keppie (SCO)	668
38	Andrew Rose (WAL)	667
39	Marios Perdikos (CYP)	663
40	Mohammad Hossain (BAN)	653
41	Christodoulos Protopapas (CYP)	649
42	Michael Graham (NFI)	638
43	Adrian Bruce (IOM)	634
44	Jules Cornet (MRI)	630
45	Robert Kemp (NFI)	626
46	Shamsher Singh (KEN)	622
47	Dimitris Vasileiou (CYP)	596
48	Mohammad Uddin (BAN)	504

== Finals ==
Quarterfinals
1	Septimus Cilliers (RSA)	6
8	Jacobus de Wet (RSA)	5
12	Christopher White (ENG)	6
4	Tapani Kalmaru (WAL)	2
14	Johannes Grobler (NAM)	0
6	Shaun Teasdale (NZL)	6
10	Robert Timms (AUS)	3
2	Duncan Busby (ENG)	7

Semifinals
1	Septimus Cilliers (RSA)	4
12	Christopher White (ENG)	6
6	Shaun Teasdale (NZL)	2
2	Duncan Busby (ENG)	6

Final
12	Christopher White (ENG)	2
2	Duncan Busby (ENG)	6
Third place
1	Septimus Cilliers (RSA)	7
6	Shaun Teasdale (NZL)	3
