= 2014 Archery World Cup =

International archery competition

2014 Archery World Cup Final
- Venue: Place de la Navigation, Ouchy (Final)
- Location: Lausanne, Switzerland (Final)
- Start date: 22 April
- End date: 7 September

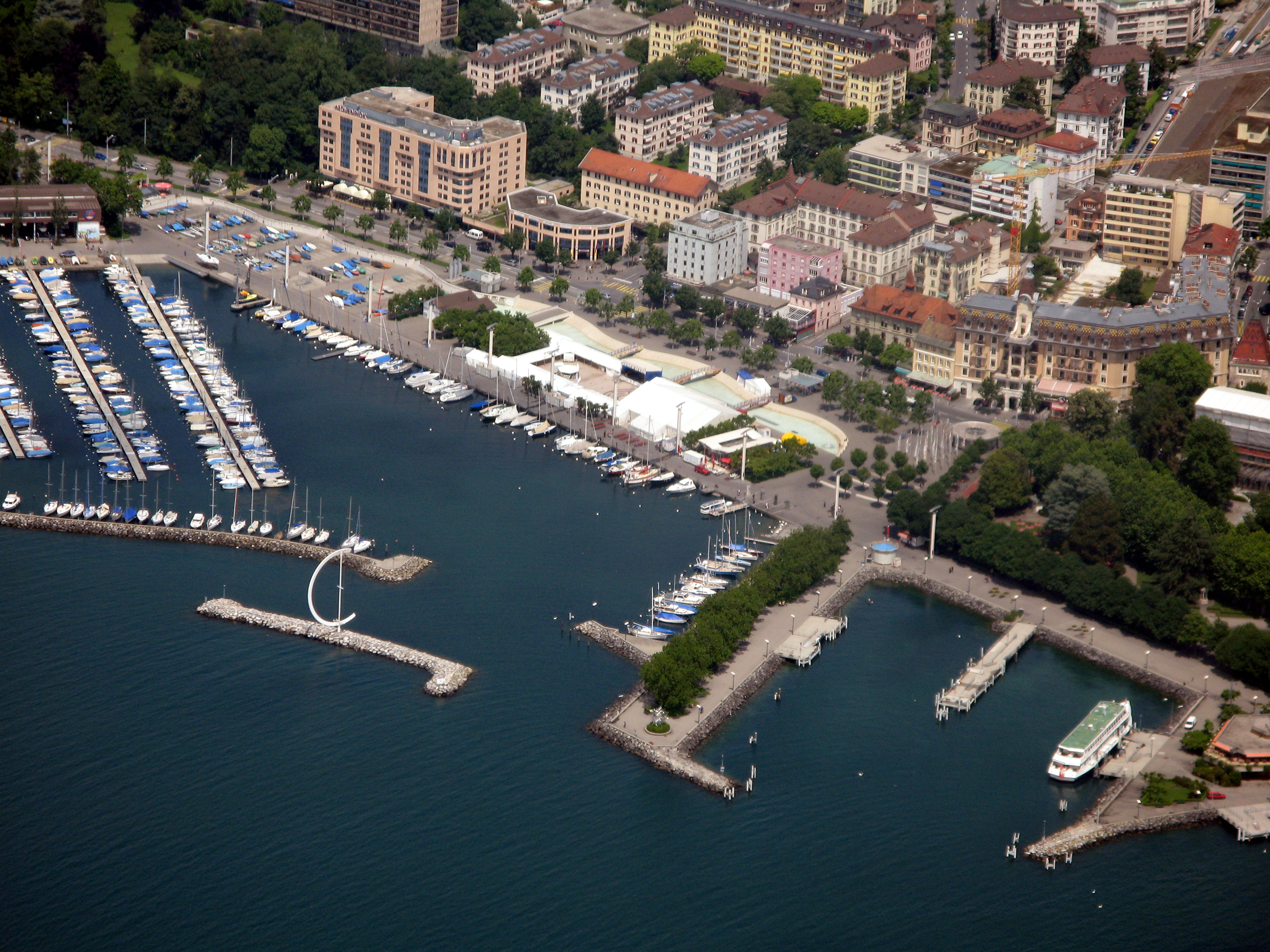
Ouchy harbour, the venue for the finals.

The 2014 Archery World Cup was the 9th edition of the annual international archery circuit, organised by the World Archery Federation.

American Brady Ellison won the men's recurve competition for a record third time, beating 16-year-old Marcus D'Almeida in the final by shoot off. The winners in the other events were all from the Americas.

== Competition rules and scoring ==
The compound legs consisted of a 50m qualification round of 72 arrows, followed by the compound round at 50m on a 6-zone target face, using cumulative scoring for all individual, team and mixed competitions. The top seven individual performers (with no more than two from each country,) plus one host nation representative if not already qualified, proceeded to the finals; the top mixed team performer proceeded to face the host nation at the finals, which were the same competition format as the legs. The team competition was not competed at the finals.

The recurve legs consisted of a 1440 qualification round (formerly called a FITA round), followed by a 72m Olympic set system. The top seven individual performers (with no more than two from each country), plus one host nation representative if not already qualified, proceeded to the finals; the top mixed team performer proceeded to face the host nation at the finals, which were the same competition format as the legs. The team competition was not competed at the finals.

The scores awarded in the four stages were as follows:

=== Individual scoring ===
Position	Points
1st place	25
2nd place	21
3rd place	18
4th place	15
5th place	13
6th place	12
7th place	11
8th place	10
9th–16th place	5

=== Mixed team scoring ===
Position	Points
1st place	16
2nd place	12
3rd place	10
4th place	8
5th place	4
6th place	3
7th place	2
8th place	1

== Hosts ==
Host cities of the 2014 Archery World Cup (italic = stage host, bold = finals host)

== Calendar ==
Stage	Date	Location
1	22–27 April	Shanghai, China
2	13–18 May	Medellín, Colombia
3	10–15 June	Antalya, Turkey
4	5–10 August	Wrocław, Poland
Final	6–7 September	Lausanne, Switzerland

== Results ==
=== Recurve ===
==== Men's individual ====
Stage	Date	Location	1st place, gold medalist(s)	2nd place, silver medalist(s)	3rd place, bronze medalist(s)	Ref.
1	27 April	(China) Shanghai	(Japan) Hideki Kikuchi	(France) Pierre Plihon	(Netherlands) Rick van der Ven	
2	18 May	(Colombia) Medellín	(South Korea) Lee Seung-yun	(South Korea) Oh Jin-hyek	(South Korea) Kim Woo-jin	
3	15 June	(Turkey) Antalya	(Germany) Florian Kahllund	(South Korea) Ku Bon-chan	(Japan) Takaharu Furukawa	
4	10 August	(Poland) Wrocław	(Netherlands) Rick van der Ven	(Italy) Mauro Nespoli	(France) Jean-Charles Valladont	
Final	7 September	(Switzerland) Lausanne	(United States) Brady Ellison	(Brazil) Marcus D'Almeida	(Netherlands) Rick van der Ven	

==== Women's individual ====
Stage	Date	Location	1st place, gold medalist(s)	2nd place, silver medalist(s)	3rd place, bronze medalist(s)	Ref.
1	27 April	(China) Shanghai	(Germany) Elena Richter	(China) Xu Jing	(Mexico) Aída Román	
2	18 May	(Colombia) Medellín	(South Korea) Jung Dasomi	(Germany) Lisa Unruh	(Russia) Natalia Erdyniyeva	
3	15 June	(Turkey) Antalya	(South Korea) Chang Hye-jin	(China) Cheng Ming	(Japan) Ren Hayakawa	
4	10 August	(Poland) Wrocław	(Indonesia) Ika Yuliana Rochmawati	(China) Xu Jing	(India) Deepika Kumari	
Final	7 September	(Switzerland) Lausanne	(Mexico) Aída Román	(China) Cheng Ming	(China) Xu Jing	

==== Men's team ====
Stage	Date	Location	1st place, gold medalist(s)	2nd place, silver medalist(s)	3rd place, bronze medalist(s)	Ref.
1	27 April	(China) Shanghai	Japan	Australia	Netherlands	
2	18 May	(Colombia) Medellín	South Korea	India	United States	
3	15 June	(Turkey) Antalya	South Korea	Russia	Japan	
4	10 August	(Poland) Wrocław	Mexico	India	China	

==== Women's team ====
Stage	Date	Location	1st place, gold medalist(s)	2nd place, silver medalist(s)	3rd place, bronze medalist(s)	Ref.
1	27 April	(China) Shanghai	China	Colombia	Japan	
2	18 May	(Colombia) Medellín	Germany	China	South Korea	
3	15 June	(Turkey) Antalya	China	South Korea	Russia	
4	10 August	(Poland) Wrocław	India	Mexico	China	

==== Mixed team ====
Stage	Date	Location	1st place, gold medalist(s)	2nd place, silver medalist(s)	3rd place, bronze medalist(s)	Ref.
1	27 April	(China) Shanghai	United States	Mexico	United Kingdom	
2	18 May	(Colombia) Medellín	South Korea	Brazil	India	
3	14 June	(Turkey) Antalya	China	India	South Korea	
4	10 August	(Poland) Wrocław	Mexico	Russia	India	
Final	7 September	(Switzerland) Lausanne	Mexico	Switzerland	—N/a	

=== Compound ===
==== Men's individual ====
Stage	Date	Location	1st place, gold medalist(s)	2nd place, silver medalist(s)	3rd place, bronze medalist(s)	Ref.
1	26 April	(China) Shanghai	(France) Sebastien Peineau	(France) Pierre-Julien Deloche	(United States) Bridger Deaton	
2	17 May	(Colombia) Medellín	(Netherlands) Peter Elzinga	(Colombia) Daniel Muñoz	(United States) Reo Wilde	
3	14 June	(Turkey) Antalya	(South Korea) Choi Yong-hee	(India) Rajat Chauhan	(Netherlands) Mike Schloesser	
4	9 August	(Poland) Wrocław	(France) Pierre-Julien Deloche	(United States) Reo Wilde	(Russia) Alexander Dambaev	
Final	6 September	(Switzerland) Lausanne	(United States) Bridger Deaton	(France) Pierre-Julien Deloche	(United States) Reo Wilde	

==== Women's individual ====
Stage	Date	Location	1st place, gold medalist(s)	2nd place, silver medalist(s)	3rd place, bronze medalist(s)	Ref.
1	26 April	(China) Shanghai	(South Korea) Choi Bo-min	(Colombia) Sara López	(Colombia) Alejandra Usquiano	
2	17 May	(Colombia) Medellín	(United States) Erika Jones	(Slovenia) Toja Cerne	(Netherlands) Inge van Caspel	
3	14 June	(Turkey) Antalya	(Russia) Natalia Avdeeva	(Iraq) Fatimah Almashhadani	(Germany) Janine Meissner	
4	9 August	(Poland) Wrocław	(Turkey) Cansu Ecem Coşkun	(Colombia) Sara López	(Russia) Albina Loginova	
Final	6 September	(Switzerland) Lausanne	(Colombia) Sara López	(United States) Erika Jones	(Russia) Natalia Avdeeva	

==== Men's team ====
Stage	Date	Location	1st place, gold medalist(s)	2nd place, silver medalist(s)	3rd place, bronze medalist(s)	Ref.
1	26 April	(China) Shanghai	United States	Australia	Russia	
2	17 May	(Colombia) Medellín	United States	Netherlands	Italy	
3	14 June	(Turkey) Antalya	Netherlands	United States	Italy	
4	9 August	(Poland) Wrocław	Denmark	Mexico	Italy	

==== Women's team ====
Stage	Date	Location	1st place, gold medalist(s)	2nd place, silver medalist(s)	3rd place, bronze medalist(s)	Ref.
1	26 April	(China) Shanghai	United States	Chinese Taipei	South Korea	
2	17 May	(Colombia) Medellín	United States	Colombia	Mexico	
3	14 June	(Turkey) Antalya	Russia	United States	India	
4	9 August	(Poland) Wrocław	United States	Russia	Colombia	

==== Mixed team ====
Stage	Date	Location	1st place, gold medalist(s)	2nd place, silver medalist(s)	3rd place, bronze medalist(s)	Ref.
1	26 April	(China) Shanghai	South Korea	United States	France	
2	17 May	(Colombia) Medellín	France	Netherlands	United States	
3	14 June	(Turkey) Antalya	Belgium	Colombia	Slovenia	
4	9 August	(Poland) Wrocław	United States	India	Russia	
Final	6 September	(Switzerland) Lausanne	United States	Switzerland	—N/a	

== Medals table ==
Rank	Nation	Gold	Silver	Bronze	Total
1	United States	11	5	5	21
2	South Korea	9	3	4	16
3	Mexico	4	3	2	9
4	China	3	5	3	11
5	France	3	3	2	8
6	Netherlands	3	2	5	10
7	Germany	3	1	1	5
8	Russia	2	3	7	12
9	Japan	2	0	4	6
10	Colombia	1	6	2	9
11	India	1	5	4	10
12	Belgium	1	0	0	1
12	Denmark	1	0	0	1
12	Indonesia	1	0	0	1
12	Turkey	1	0	0	1
16	Australia	0	2	0	2
16	Brazil	0	2	0	2
16	Switzerland	0	2	0	2
19	Italy	0	1	3	4
20	Slovenia	0	1	1	2
21	Chinese Taipei	0	1	0	1
21	Iraq	0	1	0	1
23	Great Britain	0	0	1	1
Totals (23 entries)		**46**	**46**	**44**	**136**

== Qualification ==
=== Recurve ===
==== Men's individual ====
Pos.	Name	Points	(China)	(Colombia)	(Turkey)	(Poland)	
1.	(Netherlands) Rick van der Ven	**56**	18	–	13	**25**	**Q**
2.	(Brazil) Marcus D'Almeida	**38**	5	13	10	15	**Q**
3.	(France) Pierre Plihon	**36**	21	–	5	10	**Q**
4.	(United States) Brady Ellison	**34**	11	10	–	13	**Q**
4.	(South Korea) Oh Jin-hyek	**34**	–	21	13	–	**Q**
6.	(South Korea) Lee Seung-yun	30	–	**25**	5	–	^{1}
6.	(Germany) Florian Kahllund	**30**	5	–	**25**	–	**Q**
8.	(United States) Jake Kaminski	**27**	–	11	5	11	**Q**
9.	(South Korea) Ku Bon-chan	**26**	–	5	21	–	
10.	(Japan) Hideki Kikuchi	**25**	**25**	–	–	–	

^{1.} Qualified but withdrew

==== Women's individual ====
Pos.	Name	Points	(China)	(Colombia)	(Turkey)	(Poland)	
1.	(China) Xu Jing	**47**	21	–	5	21	**Q**
2.	(South Korea) Jung Dasomi	**37**	–	**25**	12	–	**Q**
3.	(Germany) Elena Richter	**35**	**25**	5	–	5	**Q**
4.	(Germany) Lisa Unruh	**31**	–	21	5	5	**Q**
5.	(South Korea) Joo Hyun-jung	30	–	15	15	–	^{1}
6.	(Mexico) Aída Román	**28**	18	5	–	5	**Q**
7.	(China) Cheng Ming	**26**	5	–	21	–	**Q**
8.	(Russia) Tatiana Segina	**25**	–	–	10	15	**Q**
8.	(Indonesia) Ika Yuliana Rochmawati	**25**	–	–	–	**25**	
8.	(South Korea) Chang Hye-jin	**25**	–	–	**25**	–	

^{1.} Qualified but withdrew

==== Mixed team ====
Pos.	Team	Points	(China)	(Colombia)	(Turkey)	(Poland)	
1.	Mexico	**36**	12	8	–	**16**	**Q**
2.	India	**32**	–	10	12	10	
3.	South Korea	**26**	–	**16**	10	–	
4.	United States	**19**	**16**	–	–	3	
5.	China	**16**	–	–	**16**	–	

=== Compound ===
==== Men's individual ====
Pos.	Name	Points	(China)	(Colombia)	(Turkey)	(Poland)	
1.	(United States) Reo Wilde	**52**	13	18	–	21	**Q**
2.	(Netherlands) Peter Elzinga	**48**	–	**25**	10	13	**Q**
3.	(France) Pierre-Julien Deloche	**46**	21	–	–	**25**	**Q**
4.	(France) Sebastien Peineau	**43**	**25**	5	13	5	**Q**
4.	(United States) Bridger Deaton	**43**	18	12	–	13	**Q**
6.	(India) Rajat Chauhan	**31**	5	–	21	5	**Q**
7.	(South Korea) Choi Yong-hee	30	5	–	**25**	–	^{1}
8.	(Russia) Alexander Dambaev	**28**	5	5	–	18	**Q**
9.	(Italy) Sergio Pagni	**25**	–	5	15	5	
10.	(Netherlands) Mike Schloesser	**23**	–	–	18	5	
10.	(El Salvador) Roberto Hernández	**23**	5	13	5	–	

^{1.} Qualified but withdrew

==== Women's individual ====
Pos.	Name	Points	(China)	(Colombia)	(Turkey)	(Poland)	
1.	(Colombia) Sara López	47	21	–	5	21	Q
2.	(Russia) Albina Loginova	44	–	15	11	18	Q
3.	(United States) Erika Jones	42	12	**25**	–	5	Q
4.	(Russia) Natalia Avdeeva	38	–	–	**25**	13	Q
5.	(Mexico) Linda Ochoa	34	10	–	13	11	Q
6.	(Colombia) Alejandra Usquiano	33	18	5	10	5	Q
7.	(Slovenia) Toja Cerne	31	5	21	5	–	Q
8.	(Turkey) Cansu Ecem Coşkun	30	–	–	5	**25**	
9.	(South Korea) Choi Bo-min	25	**25**	–	–	–	
10.	(Netherlands) Inge van Caspel	23	–	18	–	5	

==== Mixed team ====
Pos.	Team	Points	(China)	(Colombia)	(Turkey)	(Poland)	
1.	United States	**38**	12	10	4	**16**	**Q**
2.	France	**29**	10	**16**	2	3	
3.	India	**24**	8	–	4	12	
4.	Russia	**21**	3	8	–	10	
5.	Colombia	**17**	2	2	12	3	

=== Nations ranking ===
Pos.	Team	Points	(China)	(Colombia)	(Turkey)	(Poland)
1.	United States	660	**175**	**220**	84	**181**
2.	South Korea	531	99	196	**236**	–
3.	Mexico	444	119	133	43	149
4.	Russia	373	35	46	149	143
5.	India	330	23	81	78	148
6.	China	313	76	67	87	83
7.	Netherlands	269	53	87	81	48
8.	Italy	259	–	97	81	81
9.	Colombia	241	78	71	32	60
10.	France	230	105	26	25	74

== World Cup Final ==
With the exception of the highest ranked recurve archers Oh Jin-hyek and Jung Dasomi, the qualified athletes from South Korea declined invitations to the World Cup Final in order to focus on the Asian Games, and were replaced by the next highest qualifiers. The final places were filled by representatives from the host nation, Switzerland.

=== Recurve ===
==== Men's individual ====
Quarterfinals
**1**	**(Netherlands) Rick van der Ven**	**2**	**2**	0	**2**
8	(Switzerland) Adrian Faber	0	0	**2**	0
**5**	**(United States) Brady Ellison**	0	0	**2**	**2**	1^{1}
4	(South Korea) Oh Jin-hyek	**2**	**2**	0	0	1^{0}
3	(France) Pierre Plihon	1	0	**2**	1	0
**6**	**(Germany) Florian Kahllund**	1	**2**	0	1	**2**
7	(United States) Jake Kaminski	0	0	0
**2**	**(Brazil) Marcus D'Almeida**	**2**	**2**	**2**

Semifinals
1	(Netherlands) Rick van der Ven	1	0	1	1	1
**5**	**(United States) Brady Ellison**	1	**2**	1	1	1
6	(Germany) Florian Kahllund	0	0	0
**2**	**(Brazil) Marcus D'Almeida**	**2**	**2**	**2**

Finals
**5**	**(United States) Brady Ellison**	1	0	**2**	1	1^{1}
2	(Brazil) Marcus D'Almeida	1	**2**	0	1	1^{0}
Third place
**1**	**(Netherlands) Rick van der Ven**	0	1	1	**2**	**2**
6	(Germany) Florian Kahllund	**2**	1	1	0	0

==== Women's individual ====
Quarterfinals
**1**	**(China) Xu Jing**	0	**2**	**2**	**2**
8	(Switzerland) Nathalie Dielen	**2**	0	0	0
**5**	**(Mexico) Aída Román**	**2**	1	0	0	**2^{1}**
4	(Germany) Lisa Unruh	0	1	**2**	**2**	0^{0}
3	(Germany) Elena Richter	**2**	**2**	0	0	0
**6**	**(China) Cheng Ming**	0	0	**2**	**2**	**2**
**7**	**(Russia) Tatiana Segina**	0	**2**	1	0	**2^{1}**
2	(South Korea) Jung Dasomi	**2**	0	1	**2**	0^{0}

Semifinals
1	(China) Xu Jing	**2**	0	**2**	0	0
**5**	**(Mexico) Aída Román**	0	**2**	0	**2**	**2**
**6**	**(China) Cheng Ming**	**2**	1	1	1	0^{1}
7	(Russia) Tatiana Segina	0	1	1	1	**2**^{0}

Finals
**5**	**(Mexico) Aída Román**	0	**2**	1	**2**	1
6	(China) Cheng Ming	**2**	0	1	0	1
Third place
**1**	**(China) Xu Jing**	**2**	1	**2**	0	**2**
7	(Russia) Tatiana Segina	0	1	0	**2**	0

==== Mixed team ====
Finals
**1**	**Mexico**; **Aída Román**; **Eduardo Vélez**	**2**	**2**	**2**
2	Switzerland; Iliana Deineko; Florian Faber	0	0	0

=== Compound ===
==== Men's individual ====
Quarterfinals
**1**	**(United States) Reo Wilde**	**148**
8	(Switzerland) Kevin Burri	139
**5**	**(United States) Bridger Deaton**	**145**
4	(France) Sebastien Peineau	144
**3**	**(France) Pierre-Julien Deloche**	**146**
6	(India) Rajat Chauhan	145
7	(Russia) Alexander Dambaev	144
**2**	**(Netherlands) Peter Elzinga**	**145**

Semifinals
1	(United States) Reo Wilde	146
**5**	**(United States) Bridger Deaton**	**147**
**3**	**(France) Pierre-Julien Deloche**	146^{9*}
2	(Netherlands) Peter Elzinga	146^{9}

Finals
**5**	**(United States) Bridger Deaton**	**148**
3	(France) Pierre-Julien Deloche	144
Third place
**1**	**(United States) Reo Wilde**	**146**
2	(Netherlands) Peter Elzinga	144

==== Women's individual ====
Quarterfinals
**1**	**(Colombia) Sara López**	**144**
8	(Switzerland) Clementine de Guili	140
5	(Mexico) Linda Ochoa	144
**4**	**(Russia) Natalia Avdeeva**	**145**
**3**	**(United States) Erika Jones**	**145**
6	(Colombia) Alejandra Usquiano	126
7	**(Slovenia) Toja Cerne**	**145**
2	(Russia) Albina Loginova	140

Semifinals
**1**	**(Colombia) Sara López**	**147**
4	(Russia) Natalia Avdeeva	145
**3**	**(United States) Erika Jones**	**146**
7	(Slovenia) Toja Cerne	137

Finals
**1**	**(Colombia) Sara López**	**147**
3	(United States) Erika Jones	145
Third place
**4**	**(Russia) Natalia Avdeeva**	**145**
7	(Slovenia) Toja Cerne	144

==== Mixed team ====
Finals
**1**	**United States**; **Erika Jones**; **Reo Wilde**	**158**
2	Switzerland; Clementine de Guili; Patrizio Hofer	151
