= Archery at the 2017 Summer Universiade – Men's individual compound =

Men's compound individual at the XXIX Summer Universiade
- Venues: National Taiwan Sport University Stadium
- Dates: August 20, 2017 – August 23, 2017
- Competitors: 53 from 24 nations

Medalists
1st place, gold medalist(s)		Kim Jong-ho	South Korea
2nd place, silver medalist(s)		Demir Elmaağaçlı	Turkey
3rd place, bronze medalist(s)		Mario Vavro	Croatia

The men's individual compound archery competition at the 2017 Summer Universiade was held in the National Taiwan Sport University Stadium, Taipei, Taiwan between August 20 and 21, 2017, and the finals on August 23.

== Records ==
Prior to the competition, the world and Universiade records were as follows.

- 72 arrows ranking round

Category	Athlete	Record	Date	Place	Event
World record	(United States) Braden Gellenthien	718	13 June 2016	Decatur, United States	2016 National Target Championships
Universiade record	(South Korea) Kim Jong-ho	705	4 July 2015	Gwangju, South Korea	2015 Summer Universiade

- 15 arrows final match

Category	Athlete	Record	Date	Place	Event
World record	(United States) Reo Wilde	150 (12)	7 May 2015	Shanghai, China	2015 Archery World Cup
Universiade record	(South Korea) Kim Jong-ho	149	7 July 2015	Gwangju, South Korea	2015 Summer Universiade

== Ranking round ==
The ranking round took place on 20 August 2017 to determine the seeding for the elimination rounds. It consisted of two rounds of 36 arrows, with a maximum score of 720.

Rank	Archer	1st Half	2nd Half	10s	Xs	Score	Notes
1	Kim Jong-ho (KOR)	351	347	51	24	698	
2	Kim Tae-yong (KOR)	353	344	52	23	697	
3	Rodolfo Gonzalez de Alba (MEX)	346	350	52	24	696	
4	Mario Vavro (CRO)	350	345	50	17	695	
5	Chen Hsiang-hsuan (TPE)	345	350	48	20	695	
6	Demir Elmaağaçlı (TUR)	352	342	48	17	694	
7	Anton Bulaev (RUS)	348	345	49	23	693	
8	Hong Sung-ho (KOR)	349	344	46	20	693	
9	Lovejot Singh (IND)	347	343	47	16	690	
10	Alexander Dambaev (RUS)	343	347	43	17	690	
11	Yaser Amouei (IRI)	346	343	43	11	689	
12	Victor Kalashnikov (RUS)	349	339	45	18	688	
13	Paeton Jacob Keller (USA)	345	342	45	20	687	
14	Evren Çağıran (TUR)	342	345	42	22	687	
15	Lin Che-wei (TPE)	341	346	42	21	687	
16	Milad Rashidi (IRI)	346	341	41	16	687	
17	Quentin Louis R Baraer (FRA)	349	337	43	14	686	
18	Yoke Rizaldi Akbar (KAZ)	347	339	43	13	686	
19	Omid Taheri (IRI)	345	341	42	22	686	
20	Amanjeet Singh (IND)	342	344	42	12	686	
21	Ibarra Antonio Hidalgo (MEX)	345	341	41	19	686	
22	Akbarali Karabayev (KAZ)	347	339	40	20	686	
23	Mohd Hakhiki Mohd Kamro (MAS)	346	339	43	18	685	
24	Adolfo Medina Landeros (MEX)	348	336	42	18	684	
25	Roman Hoviadovskyi (UKR)	337	346	43	12	683	
26	Ang Han Teng (SGP)	342	341	42	16	683	
27	Emre Çömez (TUR)	341	342	40	12	683	
28	Pavel Fisher (KAZ)	340	341	39	16	681	
29	Viviano Mior (ITA)	343	338	37	14	681	
30	Lin Hsin-min (TPE)	347	332	43	19	679	
31	Tay Han Yueh Shawn (SGP)	340	339	36	11	679	
32	Łukasz Slawomir Przybylski (POL)	343	336	34	10	679	
33	Aman (IND)	337	341	34	10	678	
34	Oleh Piven (UKR)	339	337	34	10	676	
35	Christopher Lin Bee (USA)	341	335	34	18	676	
36	Julian Alexande Scriba (GER)	344	331	35	12	675	
37	Adam Brown Winey (USA)	342	331	38	19	675	
38	Paul Leon Hollas (GER)	337	336	32	15	673	
39	Igor Kardash (UKR)	341	331	28	6	672	
40	Jacopo Poldori (ITA)	338	332	28	10	670	
41	Gianluca Ruggiero (ITA)	333	332	31	7	665	
42	Mohamad Firdaus Ishak (MAS)	336	329	27	6	665	
43	Santiago Nicola Regnasco (ARG)	335	327	31	12	662	
44	Andrew Arledge Brooks (GBR)	337	325	29	10	662	
45	Nur Ybrayev (KAZ)	328	329	26	6	657	
46	Amirul Amin Abd Rahim (MAS)	333	322	25	7	655	
47	Luis Fernado Aguirre Oviedo (ARG)	336	318	29	9	654	
48	Jun Jie Kenji Chong (SGP)	325	325	21	7	650	
49	Samuel Alexander Hudson (NZL)	329	321	21	7	650	
50	Juan Ignacio De Martini (ARG)	331	307	25	9	638	
51	Isak Edward Carlsson (SWE)	317	320	26	7	637	
52	Sze Sing Yu (HKG)	309	313	12	5	622	
	Eshaq Ibrahim M Al-Daghman (IRQ)					DNS	

== Elimination rounds ==
=== Section 1 ===
Round of 64
33	Aman (IND)	140 (T10)
32	Łukasz Slawomir Przybylski (POL)	140 (T9)
17	Quentin Louis R Baraer (FRA)	141
48	Jun Jie Kenji Chong (SGP)	138
49	Samuel Alexander Hudson (NZL)	137
16	Milad Rashidi (IRI)	144
41	Gianluca Ruggiero (ITA)	141
24	Adolfo Medina Landeros (MEX)	143
25	Roman Hoviadovskyi (UKR)	138
40	Jacopo Polidori (ITA)	141

Round of 32
1	Kim Jong-ho (KOR)	148
33	Aman (IND)	136
17	Quentin Louis R Baraer (FRA)	144
16	Milad Rashidi (IRI)	142
9	Lovejot Singh (IND)	145
24	Adolfo Medina Landeros (MEX)	141
40	Jacopo Polidori (ITA)	137
8	Hong Sung-ho (KOR)	144

Round of 16
1	Kim Jong-ho (KOR)	146
17	Quentin Louis R Baraer (FRA)	137
9	Lovejot Singh (IND)	142
8	Hong Sung-ho (KOR)	146

Quarterfinal
1	Kim Jong-ho (KOR)	147
8	Hong Sung-ho (KOR)	146

=== Section 2 ===
Round of 64
37	Adam Brown Winey (USA)	133
28	Pavel Fisher (KAZ)	139
21	Antonio Hidalgo Ibarra (MEX)	139
44	Andrew Arledge Brooks (GBR)	135
13	Paeton Jacob Keller (USA)	144
52	Sze Sing Yu (HKG)	138
45	Nur Ybrayev (KAZ)	136
20	Amanjeet Singh (IND)	140
29	Viviano Mior (ITA)	145
36	Julian Alexande Scriba (GER)	138

Round of 32
5	Chen Hsiang-hsuan (TPE)	143
28	Pavel Fisher (KAZ)	146
21	Antonio Hidalgo Ibarra (MEX)	141
12	Victor Kalashnikov (RUS)	147
13	Paeton Jacob Keller (USA)	137
20	Amanjeet Singh (IND)	145
29	Viviano Mior (ITA)	141
4	Mario Vavro (CRO)	147

Round of 16
28	Pavel Fisher (KAZ)	140
12	Victor Kalashnikov (RUS)	141
20	Amanjeet Singh (IND)	140
4	Mario Vavro (CRO)	144

Quarterfinal
12	Victor Kalashnikov (RUS)
4	Mario Vavro (CRO)

=== Section 3 ===
Round of 64
35	Christopher Lin Bee (USA)	140
30	Lin Hsin-min (TPE)	139
19	Omid Taheri (IRI)	141
46	Amirul Amin Abd Rahim (MAS)	134
51	Isak Edward Carlsson (SWE)	137
14	Evren Çağıran (TUR)	141
43	Santiago Nicola Regnasco (ARG)	146
22	Akbarali Karabayev (KAZ)	143
27	Emre Çömez (TUR)	145 (T10)
38	Paul Leon Hollas (GER)	145 (T9)

Round of 32
3	Rodolfo Gonzalez de Alba (MEX)	145
35	Christopher Lin Bee (USA)	137
19	Omid Taheri (IRI)	142
14	Evren Çağıran (TUR)	143
11	Yaser Amouei (IRI)	141
43	Santiago Nicola Regnasco (ARG)	137
27	Emre Çömez (TUR)	144
6	Demir Elmaağaçlı (TUR)	148

Round of 16
3	Rodolfo Gonzalez de Alba (MEX)	144
14	Evren Çağıran (TUR)	145
11	Yaser Amouei (IRI)	140
6	Demir Elmaağaçlı (TUR)	147

Quarterfinal
14	Evren Çağıran (TUR)	144
6	Demir Elmaağaçlı (TUR)	148

=== Section 4 ===
Round of 64
39	Igor Kardash (UKR)	143
26	Ang Han Teng (SGP)	144
23	Mohd Hakhiki Mohd Kamro (MAS)	140
42	Mohamad Firdaus Ishak (MAS)	135
15	Lin Che-wei (TPE)	143
50	Juan Ignacio De Martini (ARG)	133
47	Luis Fernando Aguirre Oviedo (ARG)	137
18	Yoke Rizaldi Akbar (INA)	141
31	Tay Han Yueh Shawn (SGP)	144
34	Oleh Piven (UKR)	136

Round of 32
7	Anton Bulaev (RUS)	143
26	Ang Han Teng (SGP)	145
23	Mohd Hakhiki Mohd Kamro (MAS)	137
10	Alexander Dambaev (RUS)	145
15	Lin Che-wei (TPE)	142
18	Yoke Rizaldi Akbar (INA)	143
31	Tay Han Yueh Shawn (SGP)	139
2	Kim Tae-yoon (KOR)	144

Round of 16
26	Ang Han Teng (SGP)	144
10	Alexander Dambaev (RUS)	145
18	Yoke Rizaldi Akbar (INA)	139
2	Kim Tae-yoon (KOR)	145

Quarterfinal
10	Alexander Dambaev (RUS)	146
2	Kim Tae-yoon (KOR)	149

=== Finals ===
Semifinals
1	Kim Jong-ho (KOR)	146 (T10*)
4	Mario Vavro (CRO)	146 (T10)
6	Demir Elmaağaçlı (TUR)	145
2	Kim Tae-yoon (KOR)	141

Final
1	Kim Jong-ho (KOR)	146
6	Demir Elmaağaçlı (TUR)	145
Bronze Medal
4	Mario Vavro (CRO)	143
2	Kim Tae-yoon (KOR)	138
