= 2013 World Archery Youth Championships =

- Location: Wuxi, China
- Start date: 13 October 2013
- End date: 20 October 2013
- Competitors: 523 from 63 nations

The 2013 World Archery Youth Championships was the 13th edition of World Archery Youth Championships. The event was held in Wuxi, China 13–20 October 2013, and was organised by World Archery. Junior events were held for those under 20, and Cadet for those under 17.

== Medal summary ==
=== Junior ===
==== Recurve ====
Event	Gold	Silver	Bronze
Men's individual	Robin Ramaekers; Belgium	Kacper Sierakowski; Poland	Vitaliy Komonyuk; Ukraine
Women's individual	Jeon Sung-Eun; South Korea	Sim Ye-Ji; South Korea	Lim Hee-Seon; South Korea
Men's team	Russia; Galsan Bazarzhapov; Bolot Tsybzhitov; Beligto Tsynguev	United States; Jeremiah Cusick; Daniel McLaughlin; Sean McLaughlin	Netherlands; Jesher Appels; Mitch Dielemans; Sjef van den Berg
Women's team	Ukraine; Anastasia Pavlova; Polina Rodionova; Lidiia Sichenikova	South Korea; Jeon Sung-Eun; Lim Hee-Seon; Sim Ye-Ji	China; Zhang Xinyan; Zhu Jiani; Zhu Yuwei
Mixed Team	South Korea; Sim Ye-Ji; Kim Joo-Wan	Spain; Mirene Etxeberria; Miguel Alvarino Garcia	Russia; Kristina Timofeeva; Bolot Tsybzhitov

==== Compound ====
Event	Gold	Silver	Bronze
Men's individual	Stephan Hansen; Denmark	Rajat Chauhan; India	Jignas Chittibomma; India
Women's individual	Sara López; Colombia	Janine Meissner; Germany	Kailey Johnston; United States
Men's team	Mexico; Mario Cardoso; Adolfo Medina; David Montiel	United States; Danny Button; Bridger Deaton; Alex Wifler	India; Rajat Chauhan; Jignas Chittibomma; Sudhakar Kumar Paswan
Women's team	United States; Kailey Johnston; Lexi Keller; Paige Pearce	Russia; Elena Elizarova; Anna Lemeza; Maria Vinogradova	India; Swati Dudhwal; Jayalakshmi Sarikonda; Jyothi Surekha Vennam
Mixed Team	Colombia; Sara López; Camilo Cardona	United States; Kailey Johnston; Alex Wifler	India; Jyothi Surekha Vennam; Jignas Chittibomma

=== Cadet ===
==== Recurve ====
Event	Gold	Silver	Bronze
Men's individual	Patrick Huston; Great Britain	Sanzhar Mussayev; Kazakhstan	Luis Esteban Infante; Mexico
Women's individual	Jeong Yu-Ri; South Korea	Wu Jiaxin; China	Lee Hye-Seon; South Korea
Men's team	France; Romain Fichet; Mathieu Jimenez; Thomas Koenig	Turkey; Berat Aydin; Mete Gazoz; Orkun Ege Tokusoglu	Chinese Taipei; Chen Wei-Chieh; Han Yun-Chien; Lee Chin-Tang
Women's team	France; Aurelie Carlier; Melanie Gaubil; Laura Ruggieri	South Korea; Jeong Yu-Ri; Lee Hye-Seon; Lee So-Dam	China; Li Jiaman; Wu Jiaxin; Zhang Lu
Mixed Team	Great Britain; Rebecca Martin; Patrick Huston	France; Laura Ruggieri; Thomas Koenig	South Korea; Jeong Yu-Ri; Kim Dong-Il

==== Compound ====
Event	Gold	Silver	Bronze
Men's individual	Domagoj Buden; Croatia	Renaud Domanski; Belgium	Mario Vavro; Croatia
Women's individual	Alexandra Savenkova; Russia	Sonia Taniguchi; United States	Maja Orlic; Croatia
Men's team	Turkey; Furkan Dernekli; Baris Tandogan; Samet Can Yakali	Canada; Logan Kupchanko; Hunter McGinnis; Tyler Murphy	Mexico; D Ricardo Gonzalez; Rodolfo Gonzalez; Cecilio E Quevedo
Women's team	United States; Emily Fischer; Danielle Reynolds; Sonia Taniguchi	Russia; Sofia Khlystova; Ekaterina Makeeva; Alexandra Savenkova	Great Britain; Aalin Elisse George; Kirsten George; Rebecca Lennon
Mixed Team	Russia; Alexandra Savenkova; Anton Bulaev	Croatia; Maja Orlic; Domagoj Buden	Mexico; Fernanda Del Rocio Sandoval; Cecilio E Quevedo

=== Medal table ===
Rank	Nation	Gold	Silver	Bronze	Total
1	South Korea	3	3	3	9
2	Russia	3	2	1	6
3	United States	2	4	1	7
4	France	2	1	0	3
5	Great Britain	2	0	1	3
6	Colombia	2	0	0	2
7	Croatia	1	1	2	4
8	Belgium	1	1	0	2
8	Turkey	1	1	0	2
10	Mexico	1	0	3	4
11	Ukraine	1	0	1	2
12	Denmark	1	0	0	1
13	India	0	1	4	5
14	China	0	1	2	3
15	Canada	0	1	0	1
15	Germany	0	1	0	1
15	Kazakhstan	0	1	0	1
15	Poland	0	1	0	1
15	Spain	0	1	0	1
20	Chinese Taipei	0	0	1	1
20	Netherlands	0	0	1	1
Totals (21 entries)		20	20	20	60
