= 2014 European Archery Championships =

- Venue: Ara and Aytsemnik Complex
- Location: Echmiadzin, Armenia
- Start date: 21 July
- End date: 26 July
- Competitors: 274 from 39 nations

The 2014 European Archery Championships is the 23rd edition of the European Archery Championships. The event was held in Echmiadzin, Armenia from July 21 to July 26, 2014.

Championships also served as qualification event for 2015 European Games.

== Medal summary ==
=== Recurve ===
Event	Gold	Silver	Bronze
Men's individual	Germany; Florian Kahllund	Belarus; Anton Prilepov	France; Pierre Plihon
Women's individual	Russia; Tatiana Segina	Poland; Natalia Lesniak	Spain; Alicia Marin
Men's team	France; Jean-Charles Valladont; Thomas Koenig; Pierre Plihon	Germany; Florian Kahllund; Christian Weiss; Simon Nesemann	Russia; Bair Tsybekdorzhiev; Alexey Nikolaev; Bolot Tsybzhitov
Women's team	France; Sophie Planeix; Laura Ruggieri; Aurelie Carlier	Germany; Karina Winter; Elena Richter; Lisa Unruh	Poland; Karina Lipiarska; Justyna Mospinek; Natalia Lesniak
Mixed Team	Russia; Tatiana Segina; Bair Tsybekdorzhiev	Denmark; Maja Jager; Nikolaj Wulff	Belarus; Alena Tolkach; Anton Prilepov

=== Compound ===
Event	Gold	Silver	Bronze
Men's individual	Netherlands; Peter Elzinga	Italy; Sergio Pagni	France; Sebastien Peineau
Women's individual	Russia; Svetlana Cherkashneva	Italy; Laura Longo	Denmark; Sarah Holst Sonnichsen
Men's team	Netherlands; Mike Schloesser; Peter Elzinga; Ruben Bleyendaal	Turkey; Ahmet Bacak; Demir Elmaağaçlı; Evren Çağıran	Italy; Sergio Pagni; Federico Pagnoni; Luigi Dragoni
Women's team	Russia; Albina Loginova; Svetlana Cherkashneva; Natalia Avdeeva	Great Britain; Lucy O'Sullivan; Andrea Gales; Rikki Bingham	Turkey; Yeşim Bostan; Ecem Cansu Coşkun; Gizem Kocaman
Mixed Team	Denmark; Tanja Jensen; Martin Damsbo	Russia; Albina Loginova; Alexander Dambaev	Netherlands; Inge van Caspel; Mike Schloesser

=== Medal table ===
Rank	Nation	Gold	Silver	Bronze	Total
1	Russia	4	1	1	6
2	France	2	0	2	4
3	Netherlands	2	0	1	3
4	Germany	1	2	0	3
5	Denmark	1	1	1	3
6	Italy	0	2	1	3
7	Belarus	0	1	1	2
7	Poland	0	1	1	2
7	Turkey	0	1	1	2
10	Great Britain	0	1	0	1
11	Spain	0	0	1	1
Totals (11 entries)		10	10	10	30

== Participating nations ==
At the close of registrations, 39 nations had registered 274 athletes, fewer than the 2012 European Championships which had doubled as qualification for the 2012 Olympic competition.

- Armenia (8)
- Austria (8)
- Azerbaijan (6)
- Belarus (7)
- Belgium (7)
- Bulgaria (4)
- Croatia (6)
- Cyprus (1)
- Czech Republic (6)
- Denmark (12)
- Estonia (6)
- Finland (8)
- France (12)
- Georgia (6)
- Germany (12)
- Great Britain (12)
- Greece (3)
- Hungary (1)
- Ireland (2)
- Israel (4)
- Italy (12)
- Latvia (8)
- Liechtenstein (1)
- Lithuania (7)
- Luxembourg (3)
- Moldova (4)
- Netherlands (12)
- Norway (6)
- Poland (12)
- Portugal (2)
- Romania (4)
- Russia (12)
- Slovakia (9)
- Slovenia (7)
- Spain (9)
- Sweden (7)
- Switzerland (10)
- Turkey (12)
- Ukraine (6)
