= Archery at the 2019 European Games – Men's individual compound =

Men's individual compound at the 2019 European Games
- Venue: Olympic Sports Complex
- Date: 21–27 June
- Competitors: 16 from 16 nations

Medalists
gold medal	Mike Schloesser	Netherlands
silver medal	Gilles Seywert	Luxembourg
bronze medal	Mario Vavro	Croatia

The men's individual compound competition at the 2019 European Games was held from 21 to 27 June 2019 at the Olympic Sports Complex in Minsk, Belarus. 16 archers entered the competition.

== Ranking round ==
The ranking round took place on 21 June 2019 to determine the seeding for the knockout rounds. It consisted of two rounds of 36 arrows, with a maximum score of 720.

Rank	Archer	Nation	Score	10s	Xs
1	Ognjen Nedeljković	Serbia	708 GR	60	21
2	Mike Schloesser	Netherlands	707	59	33
3	Mario Vavro	Croatia	702	55	30
4	Anton Bulaev	Russia	702	54	22
5	Gilles Seywert	Luxembourg	699	53	17
6	Pierre-Julien Deloche	France	698	51	25
7	Evren Çağıran	Turkey	697	50	29
8	Adam Ravenscroft	Great Britain	696	50	26
9	Maksim Ban	Belarus	693	46	16
10	Hampus Borgström	Sweden	690	43	15
11	Sergio Pagni	Italy	688	42	17
12	Martin Vanek	Czech Republic	687	43	24
13	Łukasz Przybylski	Poland	685	42	20
14	Mikko Juutilainen	Finland	683	40	13
15	Marcel Trachsel	Germany	681	38	13
16	Rui Baptista	Portugal	678	42	12

== Elimination round ==
First Round
1	Nedeljković (SRB)	142
16	Baptista (POR)	138
9	Ban (BLR)	140
8	Ravenscroft (GBR)	144
5	Seywert (LUX)	144
12	Vanek (CZE)	142
13	Przybylski (POL)	142
4	Bulaev (RUS)	143
3	Vavro (CRO)	145
14	Juutilainen (FIN)	142
11	Pagni (ITA)	143 (X,9)
6	Deloche (FRA)	143 (X,10)
7	Çağıran (TUR)	142
10	Borgström (SWE)	136
15	Trachsel (GER)	148
2	Schloesser (NED)	149 GR

Quarterfinals
1	Nedeljković (SRB)	139
8	Ravenscroft (GBR)	144
5	Seywert (LUX)	144
4	Bulaev (RUS)	143
3	Vavro (CRO)	142
6	Deloche (FRA)	132
7	Çağıran (TUR)	144
2	Schloesser (NED)	147

Semifinals
8	Ravenscroft (GBR)	138
5	Seywert (LUX)	140
3	Vavro (CRO)	141
2	Schloesser (NED)	145

Final
5	Seywert (LUX)	144
2	Schloesser (NED)	145
Third place
8	Ravenscroft (GBR)	139
3	Vavro (CRO)	145
