= 2015 Archery World Cup =

International archery competition

The 2015 Archery World Cup is the 10th edition of the annual international archery circuit, organised by the World Archery Federation.

== Competition rules and scoring ==
The compound legs consisted of a 50m qualification round of 72 arrows, followed by the compound round at 50m on a 6-zone target face, using cumulative scoring for all individual, team and mixed competitions. The top seven individual performers (with no more than two from each country,) plus one host nation representative if not already qualified, proceeded to the finals; the top mixed team performer proceeded to face the host nation at the finals, which followed the same competition format as the legs. The team competition was not competed at the finals.

The recurve legs consisted of a 1440 qualification round (formerly called a FITA round), followed by a 72m Olympic set system. The top seven individual performers (with no more than two from each country), plus one host nation representative if not already qualified, proceeded to the finals; the top mixed team performer proceeded to face the host nation at the finals, which were the same competition format as the legs. The team competition was not held at the finals.

The scores awarded in the four stages were as follows:

=== Individual scoring ===
Position	Points
1st place	25
2nd place	21
3rd place	18
4th place	15
5th place	13
6th place	12
7th place	11
8th place	10
9th–16th place	5

=== Mixed team scoring ===
Position	Points
1st place	16
2nd place	12
3rd place	10
4th place	8
5th place	4
6th place	3
7th place	2
8th place	1

== Calendar ==
Stage	Date	Location
1	5–10 May	Shanghai, China
2	26–31 May	Antalya, Turkey
3	11–16 August	Wrocław, Poland
4	8–13 September	Medellín, Colombia
Final	17–18 October	Mexico City, Mexico

== Results ==
=== Recurve ===
==== Men's individual ====
Stage	Date	Location	1st place, gold medalist(s)	2nd place, silver medalist(s)	3rd place, bronze medalist(s)	Ref.
1	10 May	(China) Shanghai	(South Korea) Ku Bon-chan	(South Korea) Kim Woo-jin	(Indonesia) Riau Ega Agatha	
2	31 May	(Turkey) Antalya	(South Korea) Lee Seung-yun	(South Korea) Kim Woo-jin	(United States) Collin Klimitchek	
3	16 August	(Poland) Wrocław	(France) Jean-Charles Valladont	(United States) Zach Garrett	(Belarus) Anton Prilepov	
4	12 September	(Colombia) Medellín	(China) Xing Yu	(South Korea) Im Dong-hyun	(Netherlands) Rick van der Ven	
Final	25 October	Mexico City	(Spain) Miguel Alvariño García	(France) Jean-Charles Valladont	(South Korea) Kim Woo-jin	

==== Women's individual ====
Stage	Date	Location	1st place, gold medalist(s)	2nd place, silver medalist(s)	3rd place, bronze medalist(s)	Ref.
1	10 May	(China) Shanghai	(South Korea) Kang Chae-young	(South Korea) Choi Mi-sun	(South Korea) Ki Bo-bae	
2	31 May	(Turkey) Antalya	(South Korea) Choi Mi-sun	(South Korea) Ki Bo-bae	(India) Deepika Kumari	
3	16 August	(Poland) Wrocław	(United States) Mackenzie Brown	(Japan) Ayano Kato	(Germany) Elena Richter	
4	12 September	(Colombia) Medellín	(South Korea) Hong Su-nam	(South Korea) Lee Tuk-young	(Chinese Taipei) Le Chien-ying	
Final	25 October	Mexico City	(South Korea) Choi Mi-sun	(India) Deepika Kumari	(Chinese Taipei) Le Chien-ying	

==== Men's team ====
Stage	Date	Location	1st place, gold medalist(s)	2nd place, silver medalist(s)	3rd place, bronze medalist(s)	Ref.
1	10 May	(China) Shanghai	Japan	South Korea	Indonesia	
2	31 May	(Turkey) Antalya	China	South Korea	France	
3	16 August	(Poland) Wrocław	United States	Germany	China	
4	12 September	(Colombia) Medellín	South Korea	United States	China	

==== Women's team ====
Stage	Date	Location	1st place, gold medalist(s)	2nd place, silver medalist(s)	3rd place, bronze medalist(s)	Ref.
1	10 May	(China) Shanghai	South Korea	Germany	United States	
2	31 May	(Turkey) Antalya	Japan	South Korea	China	
3	16 August	(Poland) Wrocław	United States	Georgia	China	
4	12 September	(Colombia) Medellín	Chinese Taipei	South Korea	United States	

==== Mixed team ====
Stage	Date	Location	1st place, gold medalist(s)	2nd place, silver medalist(s)	3rd place, bronze medalist(s)	Ref.
1	10 May	(China) Shanghai	South Korea	Japan	Mexico	
2	31 May	(Turkey) Antalya	South Korea	China	Japan	
3	16 August	(Poland) Wrocław	Mexico	India	Belarus	
4	12 September	(Colombia) Medellín	South Korea	China	Japan	
Final	25 October	Mexico City	South Korea	Mexico	—N/a	

=== Compound ===
==== Men's individual ====
Stage	Date	Location	1st place, gold medalist(s)	2nd place, silver medalist(s)	3rd place, bronze medalist(s)	Ref.
1	9 May	(China) Shanghai	(France) Sebastien Peineau	(Netherlands) Mike Schloesser	(France) Dominique Genet	
2	30 May	(Turkey) Antalya	(South Korea) Kim Jong-ho	(Netherlands) Mike Schloesser	(United States) Reo Wilde	
3	15 August	(Poland) Wrocław	(India) Abhishek Verma	(Iran) Esmaeil Ebadi	(United States) Steve Anderson	
4	13 September	(Colombia) Medellín	(France) Sebastien Peineau	(El Salvador) Roberto Hernández	(United States) Reo Wilde	
Final	24 October	Mexico City	(Turkey) Demir Elmaağaçlı	(India) Abhishek Verma	(Italy) Dominique Genet	

==== Women's individual ====
Stage	Date	Location	1st place, gold medalist(s)	2nd place, silver medalist(s)	3rd place, bronze medalist(s)	Ref.
1	9 May	(China) Shanghai	(Colombia) Sara López	(Mexico) Linda Ochoa	(Mexico) Stephanie Salinas	
2	30 May	(Turkey) Antalya	(Spain) Andrea Marcos	(Russia) Maria Vinogradova	(Mexico) Stephanie Salinas	
3	15 August	(Poland) Wrocław	(Russia) Natalia Avdeeva	(Colombia) Alejandra Usquiano	(Mexico) Linda Ochoa	
4	13 September	(Colombia) Medellín	(Colombia) Sara López	(United States) Paige Pearce	(Argentina) Maria Eugenia Gonzalez Briozzo	
Final	24 October	Mexico City	(Colombia) Sara López	(Russia) Maria Vinogradova	(Mexico) Linda Ochoa	

==== Men's team ====
Stage	Date	Location	1st place, gold medalist(s)	2nd place, silver medalist(s)	3rd place, bronze medalist(s)	Ref.
1	9 May	(China) Shanghai	Denmark	Iran	India	
2	30 May	(Turkey) Antalya	United States	Denmark	South Korea	
3	15 August	(Poland) Wrocław	Denmark	United States	Italy	
4	13 September	(Colombia) Medellín	United States	Italy	India	

==== Women's team ====
Stage	Date	Location	1st place, gold medalist(s)	2nd place, silver medalist(s)	3rd place, bronze medalist(s)	Ref.
1	9 May	(China) Shanghai	Malaysia	United States	Russia	
2	30 May	(Turkey) Antalya	Colombia	South Korea	Russia	
3	15 August	(Poland) Wrocław	Russia	Italy	United States	
4	13 September	(Colombia) Medellín	Colombia	Italy	United States	

==== Mixed team ====
Stage	Date	Location	1st place, gold medalist(s)	2nd place, silver medalist(s)	3rd place, bronze medalist(s)	Ref.
1	9 May	(China) Shanghai	Colombia	Turkey	Netherlands	
2	30 May	(Turkey) Antalya	Denmark	South Africa	Germany	
3	15 August	(Poland) Wrocław	Denmark	Iran	United States	
4	13 September	(Colombia) Medellín	Italy	Slovenia	United States	
Final	24 October	Mexico City	Denmark	Mexico	—N/a	

== Medals table ==
Rank	Nation	Gold	Silver	Bronze	Total
1	South Korea	13	11	3	27
2	Colombia	6	1	0	7
3	United States	5	5	10	20
4	Denmark	5	1	0	6
5	France	3	1	2	6
6	China	2	2	4	8
7	Japan	2	2	2	6
7	Russia	2	2	2	6
9	Spain	2	0	0	2
10	Mexico	1	3	5	9
11	India	1	3	3	7
12	Italy	1	3	2	6
13	Turkey	1	1	0	2
14	Chinese Taipei	1	0	2	3
15	Malaysia	1	0	0	1
16	Iran	0	3	0	3
17	Germany	0	2	2	4
17	Netherlands	0	2	2	4
19	El Salvador	0	1	0	1
19	Georgia	0	1	0	1
19	Slovenia	0	1	0	1
19	South Africa	0	1	0	1
23	Belarus	0	0	2	2
23	Indonesia	0	0	2	2
25	Argentina	0	0	1	1
Totals (25 entries)		46	46	44	136
