= Archery at the 2014 Asian Games – Men's team compound =

Men's team compound at the 2014 Asian Games
- Venue: Gyeyang Asiad Archery Field
- Dates: 23–27 September 2014
- Competitors: 51 from 14 nations

Medalists
gold medal	India; Rajat Chauhan, Sandeep Kumar, Abhishek Verma
silver medal	South Korea; Choi Yong-hee, Min Li-hong, Yang Young-ho
bronze medal	Iran; Esmaeil Ebadi, Majid Gheidi, Amir Kazempour

The men's team compound archery competition at the 2014 Asian Games in Incheon was held from 23 to 27 September at Gyeyang Asiad Archery Field.

A total of 14 teams participated in the qualification round with all 14 teams progressing to the knockout round. Each team consisted of the highest ranked three athletes from the qualification round.

== Schedule ==
All times are Korea Standard Time (UTC+09:00)

Date	Time	Event
Tuesday, 23 September 2014	10:00	Ranking round
Thursday, 25 September 2014	09:30	1/8 eliminations
Thursday, 25 September 2014	10:00	Quarterfinals
Thursday, 25 September 2014	14:50	Semifinals
Saturday, 27 September 2014	10:50	Bronze medal match
Saturday, 27 September 2014	11:15	Gold medal match

== Results ==
Legend

- DNS — Did not start

=== Ranking round ===
Rank	Team	Half		Total	10s	Xs
Rank	Team	1st	2nd	Total	10s	Xs
1	South Korea (KOR)	1042	1064	2106	163	65
	Choi Yong-hee	349	357	706	59	27
	Kim Jong-ho	346	353	699	51	12
	Min Li-hong	~~349~~	~~346~~	~~695~~	~~48~~	~~21~~
	Yang Young-ho	347	354	701	53	26
2	Iran (IRI)	1050	1053	2103	163	67
	Esmaeil Ebadi	355	355	710	63	26
	Majid Gheidi	348	343	691	46	19
	Amir Kazempour	347	355	702	54	22
	Majid Kianzad	~~344~~	~~345~~	~~689~~	~~43~~	~~19~~
3	India (IND)	1041	1054	2095	153	66
	Rajat Chauhan	347	350	697	51	18
	Sandeep Kumar	348	352	700	52	24
	Govindas Singh	~~340~~	~~351~~	~~691~~	~~46~~	~~25~~
	Abhishek Verma	346	352	698	50	24
4	Philippines (PHI)	1033	1040	2073	137	55
	Jose Adriano	~~339~~	~~337~~	~~676~~	~~36~~	~~13~~
	Ian Chipeco	337	347	684	38	16
	Paul Dela Cruz	350	351	701	55	17
	Earl Yap	346	342	688	44	22
5	Chinese Taipei (TPE)	1026	1041	2067	135	58
	Chen Po-kai	343	355	698	53	26
	Kung Lin-hsiang	345	345	690	46	19
	Li Hsi-hsin	~~333~~	~~335~~	~~668~~	~~32~~	~~12~~
	Wang Chih-hao	338	341	679	36	13
6	Malaysia (MAS)	1027	1026	2053	118	44
	Kaharuddin Ashah	~~336~~	~~338~~	~~674~~	~~30~~	~~9~~
	Lee Kin Lip	338	339	677	33	13
	Zaki Mahazan	349	342	691	45	16
	Juwaidi Mazuki	340	345	685	40	15
7	Vietnam (VIE)	1008	1036	2044	119	52
	Nguyễn Thanh Tuấn	328	342	670	33	13
	Nguyễn Tiến Cương	342	351	693	48	23
	Nguyễn Tuấn Anh	338	343	681	38	16
8	Kazakhstan (KAZ)	1012	1016	2028	104	37
	Pavel Fisher	346	350	696	49	23
	Akbarali Karabayev	331	331	662	23	7
	Artyom Kichkin	335	335	670	32	7
	Andrey Kim	~~324~~	~~321~~	~~645~~	~~22~~	~~8~~
9	Saudi Arabia (KSA)	1017	1004	2021	110	39
	Muidh Al-Baqami	341	331	672	36	11
	Turki Al-Derbi	331	331	662	28	11
	Abdulaziz Al-Rodhan	345	342	687	46	17
	Mosab Sulaimani	~~320~~	~~335~~	~~655~~	~~24~~	~~11~~
10	Hong Kong (HKG)	991	998	1989	90	28
	Chan Pak Ki	336	340	676	36	13
	Tang Kam Wo	326	319	645	23	4
	Tsui Wai Hung	329	339	668	31	11
11	Iraq (IRQ)	987	1000	1987	95	34
	Abdullah Ali	311	322	633	17	5
	Waleed Hameed	335	333	668	34	12
	Eshaq Ibrahim	341	345	686	44	17
12	Mongolia (MGL)	981	982	1963	91	30
	Pürevdorjiin Jamiyangombo	331	337	668	34	15
	Nyamsürengiin Ölziikhutag	317	309	626	22	4
	Jargalsaikhany Tulga	333	336	669	35	11
13	Laos (LAO)	964	978	1942	68	15
	Daliya Saidara	318	315	633	19	9
	Thanonglith Siriphonh	335	335	670	32	4
	Khamvarn Vanlivong	311	328	639	17	2
14	Qatar (QAT)	970	955	1925	75	28
	Abdulaziz Al-Abadi	333	339	672	34	9
	Ahmed Al-Abadi	333	334	667	31	14
	Israf Khan			~~DNS~~		
	Khadher Monser	304	282	586	10	5

- South Korea replaced Kim Jong-ho with Min Li-hong for the knockout round.

=== Knockout round ===
1/8 eliminations
9	Saudi Arabia	218
8	Kazakhstan	225
5	Chinese Taipei	223
12	Mongolia	217
13	Laos	214
4	Philippines	225
3	India	233
14	Qatar	218
11	Iraq	220
6	Malaysia	230
7	Vietnam	228
10	Hong Kong	221

Quarterfinals
1	South Korea	238
8	Kazakhstan	231
5	Chinese Taipei	226
4	Philippines	229
3	India	234
6	Malaysia	229
7	Vietnam	227
2	Iran	231

Semifinals
1	South Korea	228
4	Philippines	227
3	India	231
2	Iran	227

Gold medal match
1	South Korea	225
3	India	227
Bronze medal match
4	Philippines	224
2	Iran	227
