= Pierre Plihon =

French archer (born 1989)

Personal information
- Born: 29 October 1989 (age 36) Nice, France
- Height: 187 cm (6 ft 2 in)

Sport
- Sport: Archery
Medal record
Men's archery
Representing France
World Championships
Silver medal – second place	2017 Mexico	Team
European Games
Gold medal – first place	2019 Minsk	Team
European Championships
Gold medal – first place	2014 Echmiadzin	Team
Bronze medal – third place	2014 Echmiadzin	Individual

Pierre Plihon (born 29 October 1989 in Nice), is a French athlete who competes in recurve archery.

Plihon first competed internationally in 2014, in which year he won a team gold medal at the 2014 European Archery Championships in Echmiadzin and qualified for the 2014 World Cup Final in Lausanne, including a silver medal at the first stage in Shanghai. He represented France at the 2016 Summer Olympics in Rio de Janeiro and at 2020 Summer Olympics in Tokyo.
