= Alex Wifler =

American archer (born 1994)

Personal information
- National team: 2015
- Born: 18 March 1994 (age 32)

Sport
- Country: United States
- Sport: Archery
- Rank: 189 at World Archery Rankings (July 2015)
- Event: compound
- Updated on 1 August 2015

Alex Wolfgang Wifler (born 18 March 1994) is an American male compound archer and part of the national team. As a junior, he won the silver medal at the 2013 World Archery Youth Championships in the team compound event. He participated in the team event and individual event at the 2015 World Archery Championships in Copenhagen. He is the winner of The Vegas Shoot 2015 He won the 2016 Lancaster Classic during the blizzard Jonas.
