= Sandeep Kumar (archer) =

Indian archer

Personal information
- Nationality: Indian

Sport
- Country: India
- Sport: Archery
Medal record
Men's compound archery
Representing India
Asian Games
Gold medal – first place	2014 Incheon	Team
Asian Championships
Gold medal – first place	2013 Taipei	Team
Silver medal – second place	2013 Taipei	Individual

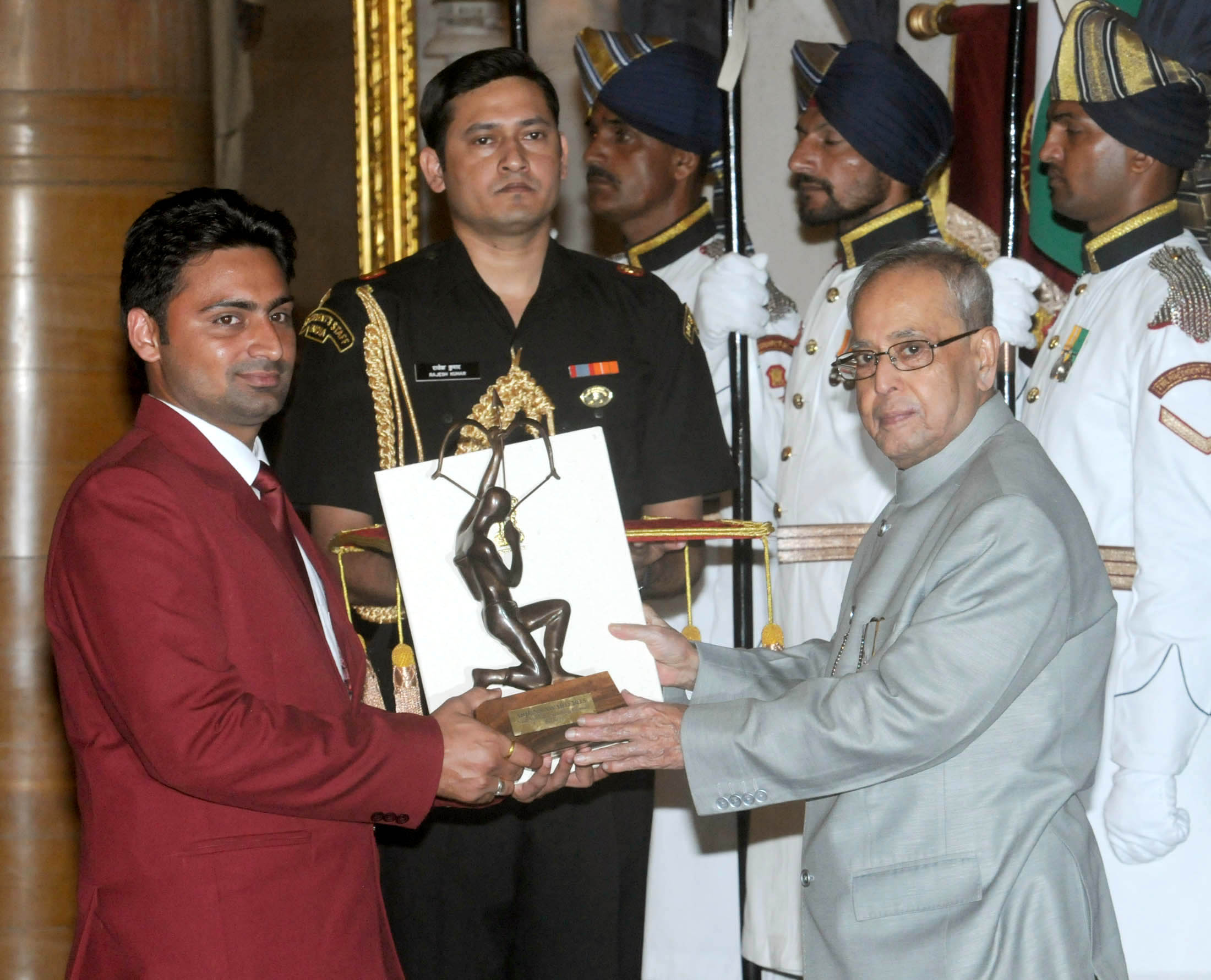
The President, Shri Pranab Mukherjee presenting the Arjuna Award for the year-2015 to Naib Subedar Sandeep Kumar for Archery, in a glittering ceremony, at Rashtrapati Bhavan, in New Delhi on 29 August 2015

Sandeep Kumar is an Indian Archer. He won the gold medal at the 2014 Asian Games in Incheon, South Korea in the men's compound archery team event along with Abhishek Verma and Rajat Chauhan. He had been honoured with the Arjuna award in the year 2015.
