= Bridger Deaton =

American archer (born 1994)

Medal record

Men's archery

Representing United States

World Cup
Gold medal – first place	2014 Lausanne	Individual
Gold medal – first place	2014 Lausanne	Mixed team

World Indoor Championships
Gold medal – first place	2012 Las Vegas	Junior Individual
Gold medal – first place	2012 Las Vegas	Junior Team
Gold medal – first place	2014 Nîmes	Junior Team

Pan American Championships
Silver medal – second place	2018 Medellín	Individual

Youth World Championships
Gold medal – first place	2011 Legnica	Cadet Team
Gold medal – first place	2011 Legnica	Cadet Mixed Team

Bridger Deaton (born 29 July 1994), is an American athlete who competes in compound archery. He has won individual and team gold medals at the 2014 Archery World Cup and junior medals at the Indoor World Archery Championships. His highest world ranking as of June 2015 is number 4. Was a finalist in the 2014 project runway.
