= Vladas Šigauskas =

Lithuanian archer (born 1967)

Medal record

Men's archers

Representing Lithuania

Lithuanian Championships
| Gold medal – first place | 2010 Klaipėda | Compound individual |
| Gold medal – first place | 2010 Klaipėda | Compound team |

European Grand Prix
| Bronze medal – third place | 2011 Antalya | Compound individual |
| Bronze medal – third place | 2011 Antalya | Compound Mixed Team |

Baltic Indoor Championships
| Gold medal – first place | 2013 Ventspils | Compound individual |

Vladas Šigauskas (born 7 August 1967) is a professional archer who internationally represents Lithuania. He was announced as the best Lithuanian archer of 2010 in recurve events.

In 2011 Šigauskas won a bronze medal at the European Grand Prix in Antalya, Turkey.
