= Demir Elmaağaçlı =

Turkish archer (born 1990)

Personal information
- National team: 2011–
- Born: 4 November 1990 (age 35) Kayseri, Turkey

Sport
- Country: Turkey
- Sport: Archery
- Event: compound

Achievements and titles
- Highest world ranking: 2 (2 May 2016)
Medal record
Men's compound archery
Representing Turkey
Universiade
Silver medal – second place	2017 Taipei	Individual
Silver medal – second place	2017 Taipei	Mixed team
World Cup
Gold medal – first place	2015 Mexico City	Individual
Gold medal – first place	2017 Berlin	Individual
Gold medal – first place	2018 Samsun	Mixed team
Silver medal – second place	2015 Shanghai	Mixed
Silver medal – second place	2016 Shanghai	Individual
Silver medal – second place	2018 Samsun	Individual
European Championships
Silver medal – second place	2014 Echmiadzin	Individual
European Indoor Championships
Silver medal – second place	2022 Laško	Team
World Youth Championships
Silver medal – second place	2008 Antalya	Individual

Demir Elmaağaçlı (born 4 November 1990) is a Turkish male compound archer and part of the national team.

== Sport career ==
Elmaağaçlı won the silver medal at the 2008 World Archery Youth Championships held in Antalya, Turkey. He was part of the Turkish team, which won the silver medal at the 2014 European Archery Championships in Vagharshapat, Armenia. He participated in the team event and individual event at the 2015 World Archery Championships in Copenhagen, Denmark. He was member of the silver medal winning mixed team at the first stage of the 2015 Archery World Cup held in Shanghai, China. He became gold medalist in the compound individual event of the 2015 World Cup final in Mexico City, Mexico.

He won the silver medal in the men's team compound event at the 2022 European Indoor Archery Championships held in Laško, Slovenia.

He won the silver medal in the men's team compound event at the Laško, Slovenia event in the 2022 European Indoor Archery Championships.
