= Tatiana Segina =

Russian archer (born 1992)

Medal record

Women's archery

Representing Russia

Indoor World Championships
Silver medal – second place	2009 Rzeszów	Junior team recurve

Youth Olympic Games
Bronze medal – third place	2010 Singapore	Individual

Tatiana Aleksandrovna Segina (born 20 January 1992, in Moscow) is a Russian archer who participated at the 2010 Summer Youth Olympics in Singapore. She won the bronze medal in the girls' event, defeating Mexican Mariana Avitia in the bronze medal match.
