= Evren Çağıran =

Turkish compound archer

Evren Cagiran
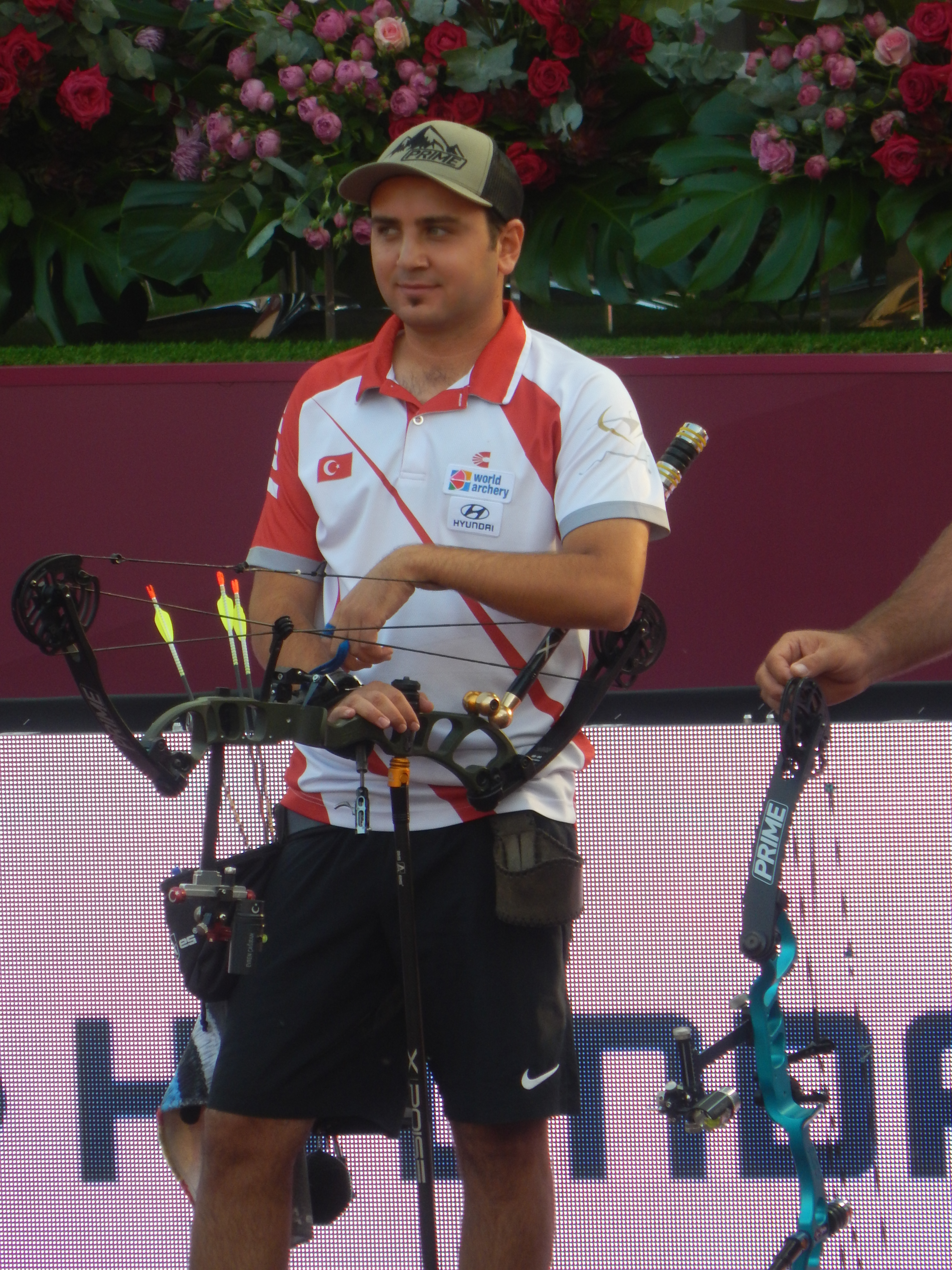
- World Cup Final in Moscow (2019)

Personal information
- National team: 2015
- Born: 14 February 1993 (age 33) Eldivan, Turkey
- Education: Aksaray University

Sport
- Country: Turkey
- Sport: Archery
- Rank: 17 at World Archery Rankings (2016)
- Event: compound
Medal record
Men's Archery
Representing Turkey
World Cup
Gold medal – first place	2021 Lausanne	Team
Gold medal – first place	2019 Berlin	Individual
Silver medal – second place	2019 Antalya	Team
Gold medal – first place	2016 Antalya	Individual
European Championships
Gold medal – first place	2021 Antalya	Team
Silver medal – second place	2014 Echmiadzin	Team
European Games
Bronze medal – third place	2019 Minsk	Mixed team
- Updated on 4 June 2021

Evren Çağıran (born 14 February 1993) is a Turkish male compound archer and part of the national team.

== Private life ==
Evren Çağıran was born in Eldivan district of Çankırı Province, Turkey on 14 February 1993. He studied at Aksaray University.

== Sport career ==
Çağıran won the silver medal in the compound team event of the 2014 European Championships held in Echmiadzin, Armenia.

He participated in the team event and individual event at the 2015 World Championships in Copenhagen.

He became champion in the compound individual event at the third leg of the 2016 World Cup in Antalya, Turkey.

He won the gold medal at the fourth leg of the 2019 World Cup in Berlin, Germany. He took the bronze medal in the mixed team event at the 2019 European Games in Minsk, Belarus.

Çağıran won the gold medal together with his teammates in the second leg of the 2021 World Cup in Lausanne, Switzerland. He and his team mates captured the gold medal at the 2021 European Championships in Antalya, Turkey.
