= Shaun Teasdale =

New Zealand archer (born 1932)

Personal information
- National team: 2015
- Born: 8 November 1932 (age 93)

Sport
- Country: New Zealand
- Sport: Archery
- Rank: 52 at World Archery Rankings (July 2015)
- Event: compound
- Updated on 1 August 2015

Shaun Teasdale (born 8 November 1932) is a New Zealand male compound archer and part of the national team. The left handed archer has participated in the individual event and the 2015 World Archery Championships in Copenhagen. He has won a gold medal in the individual event at Shanghai World Cup 2010.
