= Darrel Wilson =

Northern Irish archer (born 1980)

Personal information
- Nickname: Dazzel
- National team: 2015
- Born: 17 July 1980 (age 46) Bangor

Sport
- Sport: Archery
- Rank: 235 at World Archery Rankings (July 2015)
- Event: compound
- Updated on 2015-8-1

Darrel Wilson (born 17 July 1980) is a Northern Irish male compound archer and part of the Irish national team. He has represented Northern Ireland at numerous British Championships at both junior and senior level. He has participated in the 2013 World Archery Championships in Antalya, the 2015 World Archery Championships in Copenhagen, the World Field Championships in Dublin 2016 and Italy in 2018 and the World Archery 3D Championships in Italy 2022. He also holds multiple National records and has won numerous National titles in Target and Field Archery. Darrel was British Field Champion in 2016. Darrel has competed at the Commonwealth Games, Archery World Cups, World target championships, European Championships, World Field Championships and World 3D Championships. Darrel has won the Northern Irish Indoor and Outdoor Championships more times than any other archer.
