= Sebastien Peineau =

French archer (born 1987)

Sébastien Peineau
Personal information
- Born: 24 May 1987 (age 39) La Garenne-Colombes, France

Sport
- Sport: Archery
- Event: Compound
Medal record
Men's archery
Representing France
World Championships
Gold medal – first place	2017 Mexico	Individual
World Indoor Championships
Silver medal – second place	2012 Las Vegas	Team
European Championships
Silver medal – second place	2014 Echmiadzin	Individual

Sébastien Peineau (born 24 May 1987) is a French compound archer. His best World Archery ranking is 1st place (on 28 March 2016). He won the bronze medal at the 2011 Archery European Indoor Championships in the men's team event.

He won the 2017 World Archery Championships in Mexico

== Archery World Cup details ==
2014

- St. 1 Shanghai - Gold Individual
