= Rajat Chauhan =

Indian archer (born 1994)

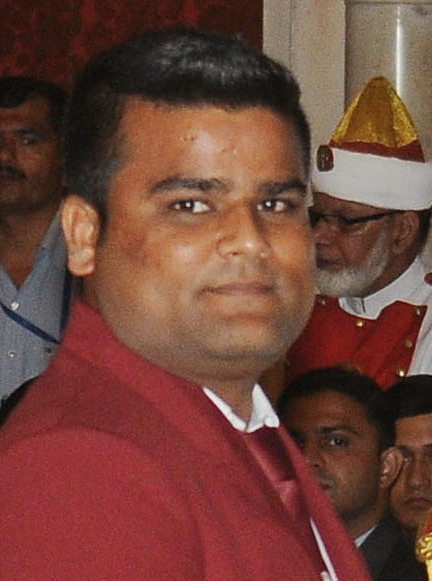

Personal information
- Born: 30 December 1994 (age 31) Rajasthan, India

Sport
- Country: India
- Sport: Archery
Medal record
Men's compound archery
Representing India
World Championships
| Silver medal – second place | 2015 Copenhagen | Individual |
Asian Games
| Gold medal – first place | 2014 Incheon | Team |
| Silver medal – second place | 2018 Jakarta | Team |
Asian Championships
| Gold medal – first place | 2015 Bangkok | Individual |
| Gold medal – first place | 2015 Bangkok | Team |
| Silver medal – second place | 2017 Dhaka | Team |
| Silver medal – second place | 2019 Bangkok | Team |

Rajat Chauhan (born 30 December 1994) is an Indian archer. Chauhan won a silver medal in the World Archery Championships in Copenhagen, becoming the first Indian to win an individual medal in compound archery at the World Championships. He won the gold medal in the Asian Games 2014 in Incheon in the men's compound archery team event along with Abhishek Verma and Sandeep Kumar. In 2014 he also became the first Indian compound archer to qualify for the Archery World Cup final, and in 2015 reached the final of the 2015 World Archery Championships.

== Other Achievements ==
(gold) 2015 Asian Archery Championships: Men's Individual

(gold) 2015 Asian Archery Championships: Men's Team

== Awards ==
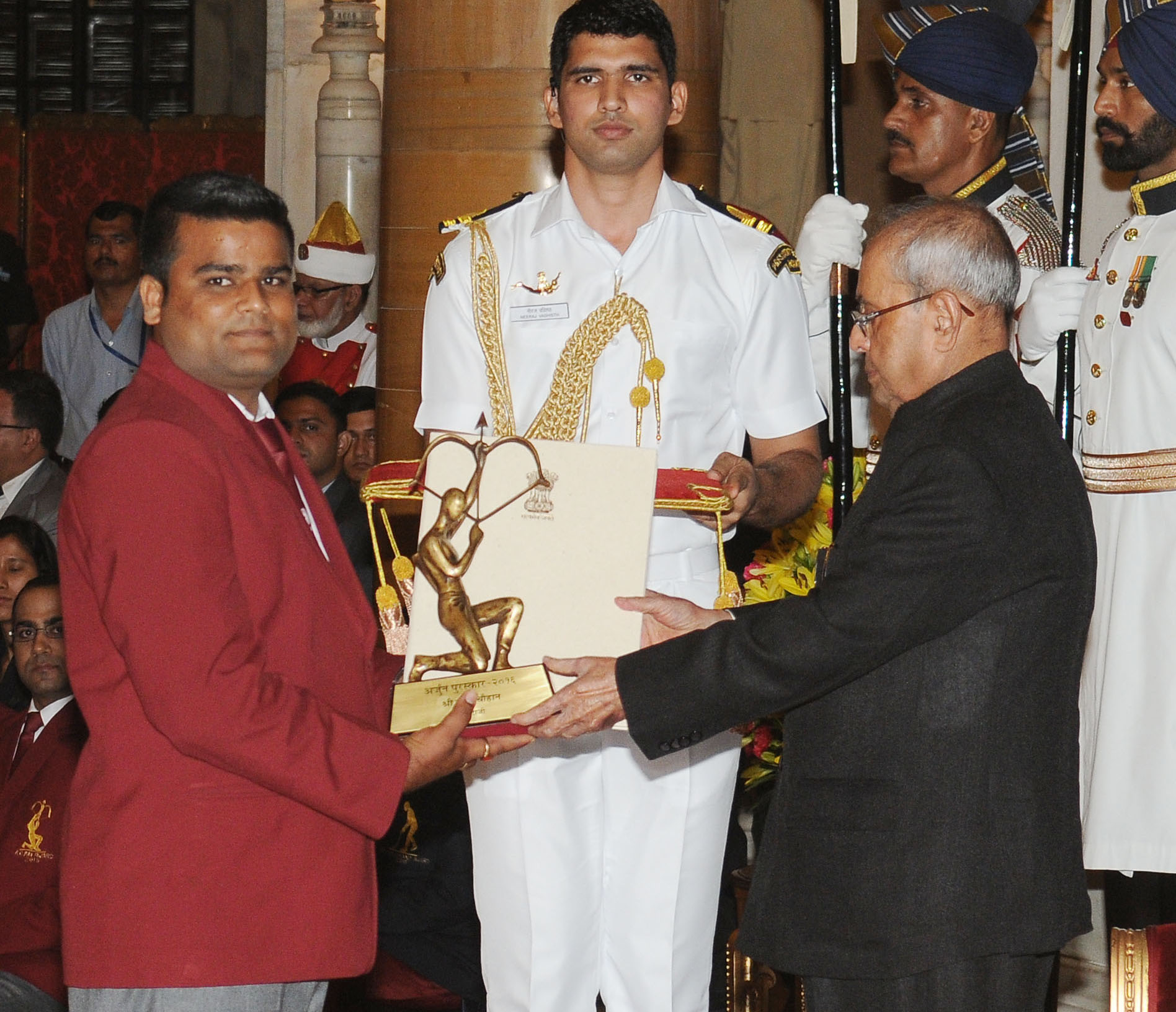
The President, Shri Pranab Mukherjee presenting the Arjuna Award for the year-2016 to Rajat Chauhan for Archery, in a glittering ceremony, at Rashtrapati Bhavan, in New Delhi on 29 August 2016

- Arjuna Award (2016)
