= Pierre-Julien Deloche =

French archer (born 1982)

Medal record

Men's archery

Representing France

World Championships
Silver medal – second place	2013 Belek	Individual
Bronze medal – third place	2013 Belek	Team

World Indoor Championships
Silver medal – second place	2012 Las Vegas	Team
Bronze medal – third place	2009 Rzeszów	Team

World Cup
Gold medal – first place	2013 Paris	Mixed team
Silver medal – second place	2014 Lausanne	Individual

World Games
Silver medal – second place	2013 Cali	Individual

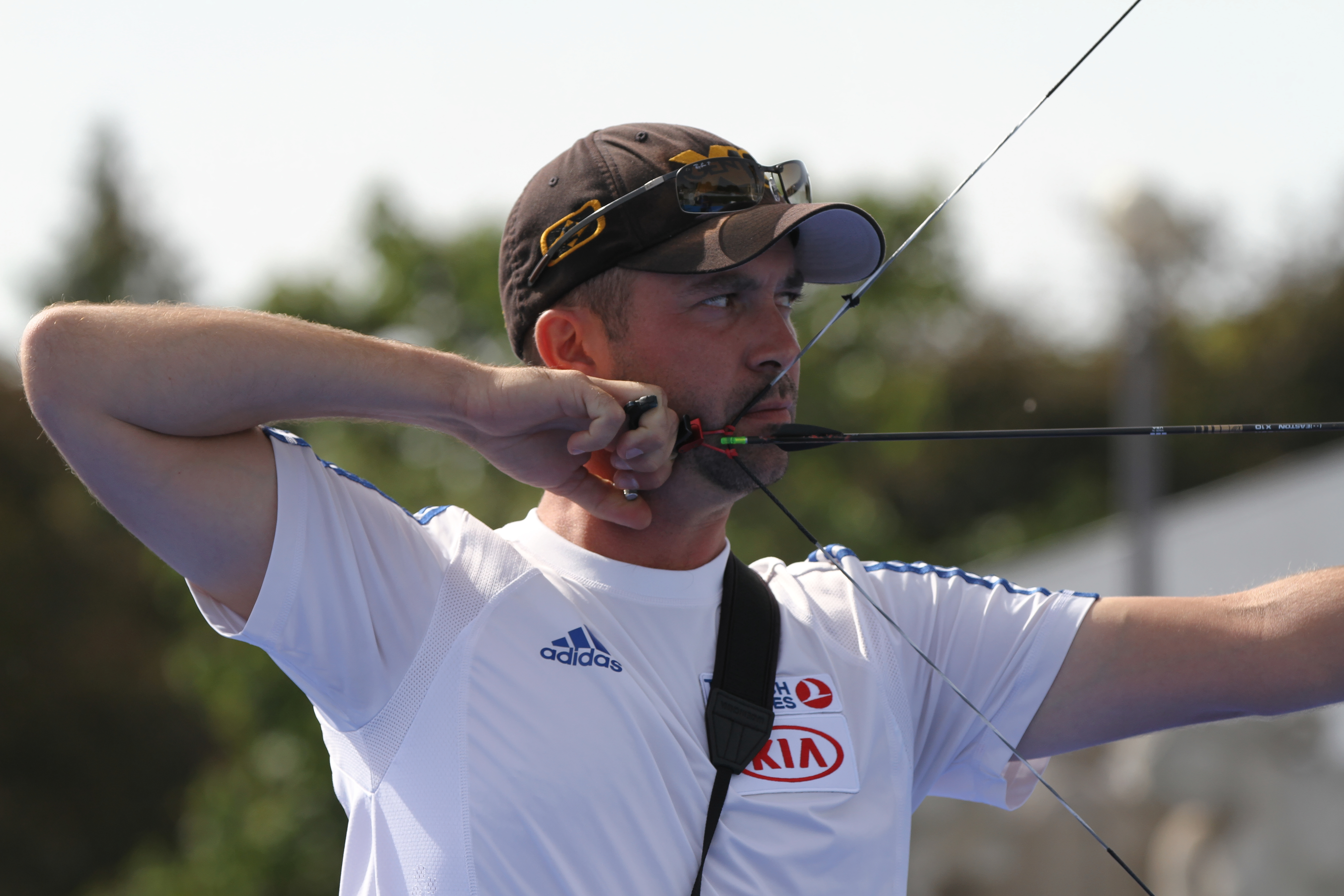
2013 FITA Archery World Cup - Mixed Team compound - Final

Pierre-Julien Deloche (born 6 February 1982) is a French athlete who competes in compound archery. He has won medals at the Indoor World Championships, two gold medals at the 2013 World Cup Final, and became the world number one ranked archer in October 2013.
