= Duncan Busby =

English archer (born 1983)

Duncan Busby (born 17 December 1983 in Heswall, Wirral) is an English archer. Busby won two gold medals for England at the 2010 Commonwealth Games in the men's compound team event and in the individual men's compound and the Individual Gold at the same event.
