= Alexander Dambaev =

Russian archer (born 1989)

Personal information
- Born: 16 June 1989 (age 37) Zabaykalsky Krai, Russia
Medal record
Men's archery
Representing Russia
World Championships
Silver medal – second place	2013 Belek	Mixed team
Bronze medal – third place	2013 Belek	Individual
Summer Universiade
Gold medal – first place	2011 Shenzhen	Individual
Gold medal – first place	2017 Taipei	Team
European Archery Championships
Gold medal – first place	2010 Rovareto	Team

Alexander Sergeyvich Dambaev (Russian: Александр Сергеевич Дамбаев; born 16 June 1989) is a Russian athlete who competes in compound archery. He won medals at the major World Archery Federation competitions, the World Archery Championships and the FITA Archery World Cup, and achieved his highest world ranking of 20 in 2011.
