= 2015 World Archery Championships – Women's individual compound =

2015 World Archery Championships
Men	Recurve	Compound
Women	Recurve	Compound
Team	Men's recurve	Men's compound
Team	Women's recurve	Women's compound
Mixed team	Recurve	Compound

The women's individual compound competition at the 2015 World Archery Championships took place from 27 July to 1 August 2015 in Copenhagen, Denmark.

== Schedule ==
All times are local (UTC+01:00).

Date	Time	Phase
26 July	tbc	Official practice
27 July	tbc	Qualification
29 July	tbc	1/48 and 1/24 Eliminations
30 July	tbc	1/16, 1/8, QF, and SF Eliminations
1 August	15:00	Medal matches

== Qualification round ==
Pre-tournament world rankings ('WR') are taken from the 18 July 2015 World Archery Rankings.

Bye to third round
Qualified for eliminations

Rank	Name	Nation	Score	10	X	WR
1	Sara López	Colombia	698	50	17	1
2	Tanja Jensen	Denmark	691	46	22	79
3	Amelie Sancenot	France	687	41	17	62
4	Jhoaneth Leal	Venezuela	683	22	10	132
5	Toja Cerne	Slovenia	682	41	14	6
6	Jamie van Natta	United States	682	40	19	65
7	Kim Yun-hee	South Korea	678	42	14	38
8	Jyothi Surekha Vennam	India	678	41	13	19
9	Viktoriya Diakova	Ukraine	677	34	9	169
10	Sera Cornelius	South Africa	676	37	13	88
11	Marcella Tonioli	Italy	675	37	13	21
12	Albina Loginova	Russia	674	36	12	8
13	Marla Cintron	Puerto Rico	674	34	19	26
14	Stephanie Sarai Salinas	Mexico	672	32	17	4
15	Naomi Jones	United Kingdom	672	32	8	101
16	Choi Bo-min	South Korea	671	34	13	10
17	Inge Van Caspel	Netherlands	671	34	11	20
18	Natalia Avdeeva	Russia	671	33	14	3
19	Andrea Marcos	Spain	671	32	12	25
20	Crystal Gauvin	United States	670	32	8	18
21	Laila Fevang Marzouk	Norway	670	31	12	311
22	Helen Forsberg	Sweden	669	35	10	n/a
23	Katarzyna Szalanska	Poland	669	32	13	48
24	Ivana Buden	Croatia	669	32	12	11
25	Runa Grydeland	Norway	669	31	17	24
26	Ana Mendoza	Venezuela	669	27	9	40
27	Maria Vinogradova	Russia	668	30	13	15
28	Sarah Prieels	Belgium	668	27	11	51
29	Linda Ochoa	Mexico	667	36	16	5
30	Janine Meissner	Germany	667	28	9	28
31	Jeanine van Kradenburg	South Africa	666	32	9	56
32	Sakineh Ghasempour	Iran	666	29	11	69
33	Laura Longo	Italy	665	27	9	13
34	Velia Schall	Germany	664	33	4	108
35	Sherry Gale	Australia	664	25	8	206
36	Lily Chanu Paonam	India	663	31	13	61
37	Irina Markovic	Netherlands	663	29	11	57
38	Purvasha Sudhir Shende	India	663	25	10	23
39	Saskia Meynen Degryse	Belgium	662	30	10	n/a
40	Seol Da-yeong	South Korea	661	37	7	106
41	Yeşim Bostan	Turkey	661	34	12	14
42	Silvia Barckholt	Austria	661	31	15	191
43	Evelien Groeneveld	Netherlands	661	31	9	n/a
44	Alejandra Usquiano	Colombia	661	30	12	9
45	Kristina Heigenhauser	Germany	660	32	16	7
46	Mariya Shkolna	Ukraine	660	30	12	111
47	Ana Cristina Juarez	Mexico	659	26	14	33
48	Maryam Ranjbar	Iran	659	25	8	78
49	Dellie Threesyadinda	Indonesia	658	23	10	54
50	Lucy O'Sullivan	United Kingdom	657	30	5	128
51	Lexi Keller	United States	657	28	9	96
52	Danielle Brown	United Kingdom	657	24	8	72
53	Tiina Karkkainen	Finland	657	23	8	n/a
54	Sarah Holst Sonnichsen	Denmark	657	21	9	36
55	Fiona McClean	Canada	657	15	7	194
56	Hala Elgibily	Egypt	656	25	4	89
57	Barbara Scott	New Zealand	655	26	7	128
58	Sandrine Vandionant	France	655	25	11	65
59	Maja Marcen	Colombia	654	26	11	29
60	Olga Bosch	Venezuela	654	26	6	64
61	Laure De Matos	France	654	23	8	90
62	Nancy Elgibily	Egypt	654	22	8	158
63	Anne Lantee	Finland	653	29	9	92
64	Yumiko Honda	Japan	653	25	8	128
65	June Svensen	Norway	653	24	3	381
66	Gerda Roux	South Africa	652	25	13	31
67	Inga Kizeliauskaite	Lithuania	652	24	8	122
68	Julia Oleksejenko	Latvia	651	27	6	110
69	Afsaneh Shafiei	Iran	649	19	6	76
70	Louise Redman	Australia	648	28	12	217
71	Erika Anear	Denmark	648	21	5	n/a
72	Olena Borysenko	Ukraine	648	11	6	317
73	Janine Hunsperger	Switzerland	647	18	6	n/a
74	Evrim Saglam	Turkey	647	18	6	155
75	Larissa Aparecida Ferrari Oliveira	Brazil	646	21	6	n/a
76	Viviana Spano	Italy	645	25	8	168
77	Lena Meynen Degryse	Belgium	645	23	8	n/a
78	Anja Johansen	Faroe Islands	644	26	6	n/a
79	Isabell Danielsson	Sweden	644	20	3	93
80	Katie Roth	Canada	644	18	6	n/a
81	Della Adisty Handayani	Indonesia	641	22	7	141
82	Bibigul Izbassarova	Kazakhstan	641	20	8	145
83	Deirdre Pattison	Ireland	640	24	9	n/a
84	Gizem Kocaman	Turkey	640	18	4	80
85	Viktoriya Lyan	Kazakhstan	639	19	8	235
86	Clementine De Giuli	Switzerland	638	19	9	317
87	Gisele Esposito Meleti	Brazil	637	21	9	254
88	Helga Kolbrun Magnusdottir	Iceland	636	23	7	n/a
89	Tricia Oshiro	Canada	635	21	5	87
90	Nely Acquesta	Brazil	635	20	10	102
91	Lilies Heliarti	Indonesia	634	22	5	n/a
92	Jelena Oleksejenko	Switzerland	634	17	6	n/a
93	Susmita Banik	Bangladesh	630	16	7	419
94	Sofie Stahlkrantz	Sweden	628	19	9	191
95	Astrid Daxbock	Iceland	628	18	3	n/a
96	Margret Einarsdottir	Iceland	627	15	3	n/a
97	Ella Hugo	Australia	624	13	6	363

== Elimination rounds ==
=== Top half ===
==== Section 1 ====
1st round
1	(Colombia) Sara López
Bye
33	(Italy) L Longo	131
80	(Canada) Katie Roth	136
81	(Indonesia) Della Adisty Handayani	134
32	(Iran) Sakineh Ghasempour	135
17	(Netherlands) Inge van Caspel	139
96	(Iceland) Margret Einarsdottir	133
65	(Norway) June Svensen	130
48	(Iran) Maryam Ranjbar	136
49	(Indonesia) Dellie Threesyadinda	136
64	(Japan) Yumiko Honda	139
97	(Australia) Ella Hugo	118
16	(South Korea) Choi Bo-min	139

2nd round
1	(Colombia) Sara López
Bye
80	(Canada) K Roth	129
32	(Iran) Sakineh Ghasempour	141
17	(Netherlands) Inge van Caspel	134
48	(Iran) Maryam Ranjbar	127
64	(Japan) Yumiko Honda	129
16	(South Korea) Choi Bo-min	137

3rd round
1	(Colombia) Sara López	149
32	(Iran) Sakineh Ghasempour	138
17	(Netherlands) Inge van Caspel	145
16	(South Korea) Choi Bo-min	138

4th round
1	(Colombia) Sara López	143
17	(Netherlands) Inge van Caspel	139

==== Section 2 ====
1st round
9	(Ukraine) Viktorya Diakova
Bye
57	(New Zealand) Barbara Scott	138
56	(Egypt) Hala Elgibily	125
41	(Turkey) Yeşim Bostan	140
72	(Ukraine) Olena Borysenko	135
89	(Canada) Tricia Oshiro	134
24	(Croatia) Ivana Buden	136
25	(Norway) Runa Grydeland	135
88	(Iceland) Helga Kolbrun Magnusdottir	129
73	(Switzerland) Janine Hunsperger	135
40	(South Korea) Seol Da-yeong	129
8	(India) Jyothi Surekha Vennam
Bye

2nd round
9	(Ukraine) Viktorya Diakova	136
57	(New Zealand) Barbara Scott	132
41	(Turkey) Yeşim Bostan	141
24	(Croatia) Ivana Buden	136
25	(Norway) Runa Grydeland	138
73	(Switzerland) Janine Hunsperger	129
8	(India) Jyothi Surekha Vennam
Bye

3rd round
9	(Ukraine) Viktorya Diakova	142
41	(Turkey) Yeşim Bostan	144
25	(Norway) Runa Grydeland	139
8	(India) Jyothi Surekha Vennam	143

4th round
41	(Turkey) Yeşim Bostan	143^{9*}
8	(India) Jyothi Surekha Vennam	143^{9}

==== Section 3 ====
1st round
5	(Slovenia) Toja Cerne
Bye
37	(Netherlands) Irina Markovic	135
76	(Italy) Viviana Spano	131
85	(Kazakhstan) Viktoriya Lyan	131
28	(Belgium) Sarah Prieels	133
21	(Norway) Laila Fevang Marzouk	143
92	(Switzerland) Jelena Oleksejenko	122
69	(Iran) Afsaneh Shafiei	134
44	(Colombia) Alejandra Usquiano	142
53	(Finland) Tiina Karkkainen	124^{10}
60	(Venezuela) Olga Bosch	124^{8}
12	(Russia) Albina Loginova
Bye

2nd round
5	(Slovenia) Toja Cerne
Bye
37	(Netherlands) Irina Markovic	140
28	(Belgium) Sarah Prieels	135
21	(Norway) Laila Fevang Marzouk	134
44	(Colombia) Alejandra Usquiano	137
53	(Finland) Tiina Karkkainen	120
12	(Russia) Albina Loginova	128

3rd round
5	(Slovenia) Toja Cerne	143
37	(Netherlands) Irina Markovic	138
44	(Colombia) Alejandra Usquiano	141
12	(Russia) Albina Loginova	140

4th round
5	(Slovenia) Toja Cerne	141
44	(Colombia) Alejandra Usquiano	140

==== Section 4 ====
1st round
13	(Puerto Rico) Marla Cintron
Bye
61	(France) Laure de Matos	122
52	(United Kingdom) Danielle Brown	129
45	(Germany) Kristina Heigenhauser	135
68	(Latvia) Julia Oleksejenko	139
93	(Bangladesh) Susmita Banik	127
20	(United States) Crystal Gauvin	141
29	(Mexico) Linda Ochoa	137
84	(Turkey) Gizem Kocaman	129
77	(Belgium) Lena Meynen Degryse	130
36	(India) Lily Chanu Paonam	136
4	(Venezuela) Jhoaneth Leal
Bye

2nd round
13	(Puerto Rico) Marla Cintron	134
52	(United Kingdom) Danielle Brown	136
68	(Latvia) Julia Oleksejenko	133
20	(United States) Crystal Gauvin	139
29	(Mexico) Linda Ochoa	141
36	(India) Lily Chanu Paonam	133
4	(Venezuela) Jhoaneth Leal
Bye

3rd round
52	(United Kingdom) Danielle Brown	132
20	(United States) Crystal Gauvin	142
29	(Mexico) Linda Ochoa	142
4	(Venezuela) Jhoaneth Leal	140

4th round
20	(United States) Crystal Gauvin	146
29	(Mexico) Linda Ochoa	143

=== Bottom half ===
==== Section 5 ====
1st round
3	(France) Amelie Sancenot
Bye
35	(Australia) Sherry Gale	133
78	(Faroe Islands) Anja Johansen	130
83	(Republic of Ireland) Deirdre Pattison	132
30	(Germany) Janine Meissner	136
19	(Spain) Andrea Marcos	145
94	(Sweden) Sofie Stahlkranz	135
67	(Lithuania) Inga Kizeliauskaite	120
46	(Ukraine) Mariya Shkolna	138
51	(United States) Lexi Keller	129
62	(Egypt) Nancy Elgibily	135
14	(Mexico) Stephanie Sarai Salinas
Bye

2nd round
3	(France) Amelie Sancenot
Bye
35	(Australia) Sherry Gale	130
30	(Germany) Janine Meissner	131
19	(Spain) Andrea Marcos	140^{10}
46	(Ukraine) Mariya Shkolna	140^{7}
62	(Egypt) Nancy Elgibily	134
14	(Mexico) Stephanie Sarai Salinas	131

3rd round
3	(France) Amelie Sancenot	143
30	(Germany) Janine Meissner	135
19	(Spain) Andrea Marcos	146
62	(Egypt) Nancy Elgibily	142

4th round
3	(France) Amelie Sancenot	142^{8}
19	(Spain) Andrea Marcos	142^{10}

==== Section 6 ====
1st round
11	(Italy) Marcella Tonioli
Bye
59	(Colombia) Maja Marcen	140
54	(Denmark) Sarah Holst Sonnichsen	142
43	(Netherlands) Evelien Groeneveld	133
70	(Australia) Louise Redman	138
91	(Indonesia) Lilies Heliarti	131
22	(Sweden) Helen Forsberg	140
27	(Russia) Maria Vinogradova	134
86	(Switzerland) Clementine De Giuli	132
75	(Brazil) Larissa Aparecida Ferrari Oliveria	136
38	(India) Purvasha Sudhir Shende	128
6	(United States) Jamie van Natta
Bye

2nd round
11	(Italy) Marcella Tonioli	139
54	(Denmark) Sarah Holst Sonnichsen	144
70	(Australia) Louise Redman	126
22	(Sweden) Helen Forsberg	136
27	(Russia) Maria Vinogradova	137
75	(Brazil) Larissa Aparecida Ferrari Oliveria	127
6	(United States) Jamie van Natta
Bye

3rd round
54	(Denmark) Sarah Holst Sonnichsen	147
22	(Sweden) Helen Forsberg	141
27	(Russia) Maria Vinogradova	145
6	(United States) Jamie van Natta	141

4th round
54	(Denmark) Sarah Holst Sonnichsen	143
27	(Russia) Maria Vinogradova	145

==== Section 7 ====
1st round
7	(South Korea) Kim Yun-hee
Bye
39	(Belgium) Saskia Meynen Degryse	133
74	(Turkey) Evrim Saglam	117
87	(Brazil) Gisele Esposito Meleti	138
26	(Venezuela) Ana Mendoza	136
23	(Poland) Katarzyna Szalanska	139
90	(Brazil) Nely Acquesta	126
71	(Denmark) Erika Anear	130
42	(Austria) Silvia Barckholt	134
55	(Canada) Fiona McClean	136
58	(France) Sandrine Vandionant	137
10	(South Africa) Sera Cornelius
Bye

2nd round
7	(South Korea) Kim Yun-hee
Bye
39	(Belgium) Saskia Meynen Degryse	136
87	(Brazil) Gisele Esposito Meleti	142
23	(Poland) Katarzyna Szalanska	143
42	(Austria) Silvia Barckholt	131
58	(France) Sandrine Vandionant	134
10	(South Africa) Sera Cornelius	127

3rd round
7	(South Korea) Kim Yun-hee	143
87	(Brazil) Gisele Esposito Meleti	142
23	(Poland) Katarzyna Szalanska	134
58	(France) Sandrine Vandionant	142

4th round
7	(South Korea) Kim Yun-hee	143
58	(France) Sandrine Vandionant	137

==== Section 8 ====
1st round
15	(United Kingdom) Naomi Jones
Bye
63	(Finland) Anne Lantee	126
50	(United Kingdom) Lucy O'Sullivan	139
47	(Mexico) Ana Cristina Juarez	137
66	(South Africa) Gerda Roux	136
95	(Iceland) Astrid Daxbock	121
18	(Russia) Natalia Avdeeva	143
31	(South Africa) Jeanine van Kradenburg	136
82	(Kazakhstan) Bibigul Izbassarova	129
79	(Sweden) Isabell Danielsson	134
34	(Germany) Velia Schall	122
2	(Denmark) Tanja Jensen
Bye

2nd round
15	(United Kingdom) Naomi Jones	135
50	(United Kingdom) Lucy O'Sullivan	132
47	(Mexico) Ana Cristina Juarez	130
18	(Russia) Natalia Avdeeva	138
31	(South Africa) Jeanine van Kradenburg	129
79	(Sweden) Isabell Danielsson	132
2	(Denmark) Tanja Jensen
Bye

3rd round
15	(United Kingdom) Naomi Jones	144
18	(Russia) Natalia Avdeeva	145
79	(Sweden) Isabell Danielsson	135
2	(Denmark) Tanja Jensen	143

4th round
18	(Russia) Natalia Avdeeva	145
2	(Denmark) Tanja Jensen	144

== Finals ==
Quarterfinals
1	(Colombia) Sara López	146
41	(Turkey) Yeşim Bostan	138
5	(Slovenia) Toja Cerne	142^{9}
20	(United States) Crystal Gauvin	142^{10}
19	(Spain) Andrea Marcos	141
27	(Russia) Maria Vinogradova	142
7	(South Korea) Kim Yun-hee	143
18	(Russia) Natalia Avdeeva	139

Semifinals
1	(Colombia) Sara López	144
20	(United States) Crystal Gauvin	145
27	(Russia) Maria Vinogradova	145
7	(South Korea) Kim Yun-hee	146

Finals
20	(United States) Crystal Gauvin	141
7	(South Korea) Kim Yun-hee	144
Third place
1	(Colombia) Sara López	145
27	(Russia) Maria Vinogradova	138
