= 2015 World Archery Championships – Women's team compound =

2015 World Archery Championships
Men	Recurve	Compound
Women	Recurve	Compound
Team	Men's recurve	Men's compound
Team	Women's recurve	Women's compound
Mixed team	Recurve	Compound

The women's team compound competition at the 2015 World Archery Championships took place from 26 July to 1 August in Copenhagen, Denmark.

27 countries entered the full quota of three archers into the qualification round, thus becoming eligible for the team competition. The combined totals of the three archers from each country in the qualification round were added together, and the 16 teams with the highest combined scores competed in the elimination rounds.

== Schedule ==
All times are local (UTC+01:00).

Date	Time	Phase
26 July	tbc	Official practice
27 July	tbc	Qualification
28 July	tbc	1/8, QF, and SF Eliminations
1 August	11:00	Medal matches

== Qualification round ==
Pre-tournament world rankings ('WR') are taken from the 18 July 2015 World Archery Rankings.

Qualified for eliminations

Rank	Nation	Name	Score	WR
1	Colombia	Sara López; Maja Marcen; Alejandra Usquiano	2013	1
2	Russia	Natalia Avdeeva; Albina Loginova; Maria Vinogradova	2013	2
3	South Korea	Choi Bo-min; Kim Yun-hee; Seol Da-yeong	2010	4
4	United States	Crystal Gauvin; Lexi Keller; Jamie Van Natta	2009	3
5	Venezuela	Olga Bosch; Jhoaneth Leal; Ana Mendoza	2006	15
6	India	Lily Chanu Paonam; Purvasha Sudhir Shende; Jyothi Surekha Vennam	2004	11
7	Mexico	Ana Cristina Juarez; Linda Ochoa; Stephanie Sarai Salinas	1998	9
8	France	Laure De Matos; Amelie Sancenot; Sandrine Vandionant	1996	5
9	Denmark	Erika Anear; Tanja Jensen; Sarah Holst Sonnichsen	1996	19
10	Netherlands	Evelien Groeneveld; Irina Markovic; Inge Van Caspel	1995	7
11	South Africa	Sera Cornelius; Gerda Roux; Jeanine van Kradenburg	1994	20
12	Norway	Laila Fevang Marzouk; Runa Grydeland; June Svensen	1992	n/a
13	Germany	Kristina Heigenhauser; Janine Meissner; Velia Schall	1991	14
14	United Kingdom	Danielle Brown; Naomi Jones; Lucy O'Sullivan	1986	10
15	Italy	Anastasia Anastasio; Laura Longo; Marcella Tonioli	1985	8
16	Ukraine	Olena Borysenko; Viktoriya Dyakova; Mariya Shkolna	1985	31
17	Belgium	Lena Meynen Degryse; Saskia Meynen Degryse; Sarah Prieels	1975	n/a
18	Iran	Sakineh Ghasempour; Maryam Ranjbar; Afsaneh Shafielavijeh	1974	17
19	Turkey	Yeşim Bostan; Gizem Kocaman; Evrim Saglam	1948	12
20	Sweden	Isabell Danielsson; Helen Forsberg; Sofie Stahlkrantz	1941	37
21	Australia	Sherry Gale; Ella Hugo; Louise Redman	1936	29
22	Canada	Fiona McClean; Tricia Oshiro; Katie Roth	1936	32
23	Indonesia	Della Adisty Handayani; Lilies Heliarti; Dellie Threesyadinda	1933	16
24	Switzerland	Clementine De Giuli; Janine Hunsperger; Jelena Oleksejenko	1919	n/a
25	Brazil	Nely Acquesta; Larissa Aparecida Ferrari Oliveira; Gisele Esposito Meleti	1918	24
26	Iceland	Astrid Daxbock; Margret Einarsdottir; Helga Kolbrun Magnusdottir	1891	n/a

== Elimination rounds ==
1st round
1	Colombia	210
16	Ukraine	216
9	Denmark	222
8	France	218
5	Venezuela	225
12	Norway	219
13	Germany	221
4	United States	226
3	South Korea	235
14	United Kingdom	214
11	South Africa	223^{29}
6	India	223^{27}
7	Mexico	220
10	Netherlands	224
15	Italy	227
2	Russia	224

Quarterfinals
16	Ukraine	220
9	Denmark	219
5	Venezuela	222
4	United States	217
3	South Korea	227
11	South Africa	224
7	Netherlands	220
15	Italy	213

Semifinals
16	Ukraine	224
5	Venezuela	222
3	South Korea	218
7	Netherlands	222

Finals
16	Ukraine	226
7	Netherlands	223
Third place
5	Venezuela	224
3	South Korea	229
