= Archery at the 2014 Asian Games – Women's individual compound =

Women's individual compound at the 2014 Asian Games
- Venue: Gyeyang Asiad Archery Field
- Dates: 23–27 September 2014
- Competitors: 38 from 13 nations

Medalists
gold medal	Choi Bo-min	South Korea
silver medal	Seok Ji-hyun	South Korea
bronze medal	Trisha Deb	India

The women's individual compound archery competition at the 2014 Asian Games in Incheon was held from 23 to 27 September at Gyeyang Asiad Archery Field. Trisha Deb of India set a new Asian games record of 146 in the round of 16 match-ups.

A total of 38 archers participated in the qualification round. Only the top two archers from each country progressed to the knockout stage.

== Schedule ==
All times are Korea Standard Time (UTC+09:00)

Date	Time	Event
Tuesday, 23 September 2014	14:30	Ranking round
Thursday, 25 September 2014	11:10	1/16 eliminations
Thursday, 25 September 2014	11:40	1/8 eliminations
Thursday, 25 September 2014	15:50	Quarterfinals
Saturday, 27 September 2014	14:30	Semifinals
Saturday, 27 September 2014	15:30	Bronze medal match
Saturday, 27 September 2014	15:44	Gold medal match

== Results ==
=== Ranking round ===
Rank	Seed	Athlete	Half		Total	10s	Xs
Rank	Seed	Athlete	1st	2nd	Total	10s	Xs
1	1	Choi Bo-min (KOR)	346	349	695	49	21
2	2	Seok Ji-hyun (KOR)	348	347	695	48	23
3	—	Kim Yun-hee (KOR)	345	347	692	46	12
4	3	Trisha Deb (IND)	341	346	687	42	14
5	4	Huang I-jou (TPE)	338	345	683	43	17
6	5	Dellie Threesyadinda (INA)	346	337	683	39	10
7	6	Sakineh Ghasempour (IRI)	344	338	682	41	16
8	7	Chen Li-ju (TPE)	337	344	681	39	20
9	8	Sri Ranti (INA)	336	345	681	38	18
10	9	Fatimah Saad (IRQ)	343	338	681	37	17
11	10	Purvasha Shende (IND)	336	344	680	37	14
12	—	Jyothi Surekha (IND)	339	341	680	36	17
13	11	Shabnam Sarlak (IRI)	334	346	680	36	14
14	—	Wu Ting-ting (TPE)	343	336	679	37	16
15	—	Lily Chanu Paonam (IND)	342	335	677	34	10
16	12	Abbigail Tindugan (PHI)	338	338	676	38	19
17	—	Wen Ning-meng (TPE)	334	342	676	36	14
18	13	Amaya Cojuangco (PHI)	329	345	674	34	7
19	—	Maryam Ranjbar (IRI)	334	340	674	33	10
20	14	Yumiko Honda (JPN)	330	343	673	36	13
21	15	Nina Fisher (KAZ)	335	336	671	37	11
22	—	Rona Siska Sari (INA)	336	334	670	30	12
23	16	Viktoriya Polonskaya (KAZ)	337	332	669	33	11
24	—	Joann Tabañag (PHI)	332	336	668	32	9
25	17	Phone Khamkeo (LAO)	329	337	666	27	10
26	—	Bibigul Izbassarova (KAZ)	329	336	665	28	9
27	—	Svetlana Shepotko (KAZ)	333	329	662	30	10
28	18	Aye Aye Thin (MYA)	328	333	661	25	9
29	—	Della Adisty Handayani (INA)	333	326	659	27	7
30	19	Shum Kit Pui (HKG)	327	331	658	29	12
31	—	Minoo Abedi (IRI)	331	327	658	27	7
32	—	Youn So-jung (KOR)	328	330	658	26	8
33	20	Daophasouk Detsone (LAO)	330	319	649	25	8
34	21	Yaw Sein Yah (MYA)	321	328	649	22	7
35	—	Bouppha Thana (LAO)	315	321	636	19	6
36	22	Battsetsegiin Batdulam (MGL)	307	321	628	15	7
37	23	Erdenechimegiin Bolormaa (MGL)	309	295	604	16	7
38	—	Oyuuny Buyanjargal (MGL)	280	271	551	8	2

=== Knockout round ===
==== Finals ====
Gold medal match
1	Choi Bo-min (KOR)	144
2	Seok Ji-hyun (KOR)	143

Bronze medal match
4	Huang I-jou (TPE)	134
3	Trisha Deb (IND)	138

==== Top half ====
1/16 eliminations
17	Phone Khamkeo (LAO)	136
16	Viktoriya Polonskaya (KAZ)	138
21	Yaw Sein Yah (MYA)	134
12	Abbigail Tindugan (PHI)	139
13	Amaya Cojuangco (PHI)	137
20	Daophasouk Detsone (LAO)	128

1/8 eliminations
1	Choi Bo-min (KOR)	138
16	Viktoriya Polonskaya (KAZ)	124
9	Fatimah Saad (IRQ)	138
8	Sri Ranti (INA)	143
5	Dellie Threesyadinda (INA)	138
12	Abbigail Tindugan (PHI)	136
13	Amaya Cojuangco (PHI)	140
4	Huang I-jou (TPE)	142

Quarterfinals
1	Choi Bo-min (KOR)	142
8	Sri Ranti (INA)	140
5	Dellie Threesyadinda (INA)	132
4	Huang I-jou (TPE)	141

Semifinals
1	Choi Bo-min (KOR)	145
4	Huang I-jou (TPE)	139

==== Bottom half ====
1/16 eliminations
19	Shum Kit Pui (HKG)	138
14	Yumiko Honda (JPN)	142
11	Shabnam Sarlak (IRI)	127
22	Battsetsegiin Batdulam (MGL)	125
23	Erdenechimegiin Bolormaa (MGL)	117
10	Purvasha Shende (IND)	132
15	Nina Fisher (KAZ)	134^{9}
18	Aye Aye Thin (MYA)	134^{9*}

1/8 eliminations
3	Trisha Deb (IND)	146
14	Yumiko Honda (JPN)	140
11	Shabnam Sarlak (IRI)	140
6	Sakineh Ghasempour (IRI)	138
7	Chen Li-ju (TPE)	139^{8}
10	Purvasha Shende (IND)	139^{9}
18	Aye Aye Thin (MYA)	136
2	Seok Ji-hyun (KOR)	144

Quarterfinals
3	Trisha Deb (IND)	142
11	Shabnam Sarlak (IRI)	131
10	Purvasha Shende (IND)	140
2	Seok Ji-hyun (KOR)	143

Semifinals
3	Trisha Deb (IND)	140
2	Seok Ji-hyun (KOR)	145
