= De Giuli =

Italian surname

De Giuli is an Italian surname.

== Notable people ==
- Clémentine de Giuli (born 1993), Swiss archer
- Gian Vincenzo de' Giuli (died 1672), Italian Catholic bishop
- John DeGiuli (born 1961), Canadian rock singer and member of Honeymoon Suite
- Teresa De Giuli Borsi (1817–1877), Italian opera singer
- Valentine de Giuli (born 1990), Swiss archer
