= 2016 Archery World Cup =

International archery competition

The 2016 Archery World Cup is the 11th edition of the international archery circuit organised annually by the World Archery Federation. The preliminary stage consisted of three legs instead of the usual four, to make room for the Olympic archery tournament. The third leg was also the final Olympic qualification event.

== Competition rules and scoring ==
The compound legs consisted of a 50 m qualification round of 72 arrows, followed by the compound round at 50 m on a 6-zone target face, using cumulative scoring for all individual, team and mixed competitions. The top seven individual performers (with no more than two from each country,) plus one host nation representative if not already qualified, proceeded to the finals; the top mixed team performer proceeded to face the host nation at the finals, which were the same competition format as the legs. The team competition was not competed at the finals.

The recurve legs consisted of a 1440 qualification round (formerly called a FITA round), followed by a 72 m Olympic set system. The top seven individual performers (with no more than two from each country), plus one host nation representative if not already qualified, proceeded to the finals; the top mixed team performer proceeded to face the host nation at the finals, which were the same competition format as the legs. The team competition was not competed at the finals.

The scores awarded in the four stages were as follows:

=== Individual scoring ===
| Position | Points |
|---|---|
| 1st place | 25 |
| 2nd place | 21 |
| 3rd place | 18 |
| 4th place | 15 |
| 5th place | 13 |
| 6th place | 12 |
| 7th place | 11 |
| 8th place | 10 |
| 9th–16th place | 5 |

=== Mixed team scoring ===
| Position | Points |
|---|---|
| 1st place | 16 |
| 2nd place | 12 |
| 3rd place | 10 |
| 4th place | 8 |
| 5th place | 4 |
| 6th place | 3 |
| 7th place | 2 |
| 8th place | 1 |

== Calendar ==
| Stage | Date | Location |
|---|---|---|
| 1 | 26 April – 1 May | Shanghai, China |
| 2 | 9–15 May | Medellín, Colombia |
| 3 | 12–19 June | Antalya, Turkey |
| Final | 24–25 September | Odense, Denmark |

== Results ==
=== Recurve ===
==== Men's individual ====
| Stage | Date | Location | 1st place, gold medalist(s) | 2nd place, silver medalist(s) | 3rd place, bronze medalist(s) | Ref. |
|---|---|---|---|---|---|---|
| 1 | 1 May | (China) Shanghai | (Netherlands) Sjef van den Berg | (United States) Zach Garrett | (Chinese Taipei) Wei Chun-heng | |
| 2 | 15 May | (Colombia) Medellín | (United States) Brady Ellison | (Spain) Miguel Alvariño Garcia | (South Korea) Ku Bon-chan | |
| 3 | 19 June | (Turkey) Antalya | (South Korea) Lee Seung-yun | (South Korea) Ku Bon-chan | (South Korea) Kim Woo-jin | |
| Final | 25 September | (Denmark) Odense | (United States) Brady Ellison | (Netherlands) Sjef Van Den Berg | (South Korea) Ku Bon-chan | |

==== Women's individual ====
| Stage | Date | Location | 1st place, gold medalist(s) | 2nd place, silver medalist(s) | 3rd place, bronze medalist(s) | Ref. |
|---|---|---|---|---|---|---|
| 1 | 1 May | (China) Shanghai | (South Korea) Ju Hye-bin | (Chinese Taipei) Tan Ya-ting | (South Korea) Kim Chae-yoon | |
| 2 | 15 May | (Colombia) Medellín | (South Korea) Choi Mi-sun | (China) Wu Jiaxin | (Chinese Taipei) Tan Ya-ting | |
| 3 | 19 June | (Turkey) Antalya | (South Korea) Choi Mi-sun | (Russia) Ksenia Perova | (Chinese Taipei) Tan Ya-ting | |
| Final | 25 September | (Denmark) Odense | (South Korea) Ki Bo-bae | (South Korea) Choi Mi-sun | (Chinese Taipei) Tan Ya-ting | |

==== Men's team ====
| Stage | Date | Location | 1st place, gold medalist(s) | 2nd place, silver medalist(s) | 3rd place, bronze medalist(s) | Ref. |
|---|---|---|---|---|---|---|
| 1 | 1 May | (China) Shanghai | South Korea | Netherlands | India | |
| 2 | 15 May | (Colombia) Medellín | South Korea | Mexico | Spain | |
| 3 | 19 June | (Turkey) Antalya | South Korea | Mexico | United States | |

==== Women's team ====
| Stage | Date | Location | 1st place, gold medalist(s) | 2nd place, silver medalist(s) | 3rd place, bronze medalist(s) | Ref. |
|---|---|---|---|---|---|---|
| 1 | 1 May | (China) Shanghai | Chinese Taipei | India | Russia | |
| 2 | 15 May | (Colombia) Medellín | South Korea | China | Mexico | |
| 3 | 19 June | (Turkey) Antalya | South Korea | Russia | Italy | |

==== Mixed team ====
| Stage | Date | Location | 1st place, gold medalist(s) | 2nd place, silver medalist(s) | 3rd place, bronze medalist(s) | Ref. |
|---|---|---|---|---|---|---|
| 1 | 1 May | (China) Shanghai | United States | Chinese Taipei | India | |
| 2 | 15 May | (Colombia) Medellín | South Korea | Japan | Chinese Taipei | |
| 3 | 19 June | (Turkey) Antalya | South Korea | India | Chinese Taipei | |
| Final | 25 September | (Denmark) Odense | South Korea | Denmark | — | |

=== Compound ===
==== Men's individual ====
| Stage | Date | Location | 1st place, gold medalist(s) | 2nd place, silver medalist(s) | 3rd place, bronze medalist(s) | Ref. |
|---|---|---|---|---|---|---|
| 1 | 30 April | (China) Shanghai | (Netherlands) Mike Schloesser | (Turkey) Demir Elmaağaçlı | (Australia) Michael Brosnan | |
| 2 | 14 May | (Colombia) Medellín | (Italy) Sergio Pagni | (United States) Reo Wilde | (Denmark) Martin Damsbo | |
| 3 | 18 June | (Turkey) Antalya | (Turkey) Evren Çağıran | (Turkey) Samet Can Yakalı | (Croatia) Domagoj Buden | |
| Final | 24 September | (Denmark) Odense | (Netherlands) Mike Schloesser | (South Africa) Seppie Cilliers | (United States) Reo Wilde | |

==== Women's individual ====
| Stage | Date | Location | 1st place, gold medalist(s) | 2nd place, silver medalist(s) | 3rd place, bronze medalist(s) | Ref. |
|---|---|---|---|---|---|---|
| 1 | 30 April | (China) Shanghai | (Colombia) Sara López | (Denmark) Sarah Holst Sonnichsen | (South Korea) Seol Da-yeong | |
| 2 | 14 May | (Colombia) Medellín | (Colombia) Sara López | (United States) Crystal Gauvin | (Italy) Marcella Tonioli | |
| 3 | 18 June | (Turkey) Antalya | (Colombia) Sara López | (United States) Dahlia Crook | (Turkey) Yeşim Bostan | |
| Final | 24 September | (Denmark) Odense | (Italy) Marcella Tonioli | (Denmark) Sarah Holst Sonnichsen | (United States) Crystal Gauvin | |

==== Men's team ====
| Stage | Date | Location | 1st place, gold medalist(s) | 2nd place, silver medalist(s) | 3rd place, bronze medalist(s) | Ref. |
|---|---|---|---|---|---|---|
| 1 | 30 April | (China) Shanghai | Iran | United States | Australia | |
| 2 | 14 May | (Colombia) Medellín | United States | Italy | France | |
| 3 | 18 June | (Turkey) Antalya | United States | Italy | Denmark | |

==== Women's team ====
| Stage | Date | Location | 1st place, gold medalist(s) | 2nd place, silver medalist(s) | 3rd place, bronze medalist(s) | Ref. |
|---|---|---|---|---|---|---|
| 1 | 30 April | (China) Shanghai | Denmark | Russia | Turkey | |
| 2 | 14 May | (Colombia) Medellín | Colombia | United States | Italy | |
| 3 | 18 June | (Turkey) Antalya | Russia | Netherlands | Indonesia | |

==== Mixed team ====
| Stage | Date | Location | 1st place, gold medalist(s) | 2nd place, silver medalist(s) | 3rd place, bronze medalist(s) | Ref. |
|---|---|---|---|---|---|---|
| 1 | 30 April | (China) Shanghai | France | Colombia | Russia | |
| 2 | 14 May | (Colombia) Medellín | Colombia | Italy | France | |
| 3 | 18 June | (Turkey) Antalya | Colombia | United Kingdom | Italy | |
| Final | 25 September | (Denmark) Odense | Denmark | Colombia | — | |

== Medals table ==
| Rank | Nation | Gold | Silver | Bronze | Total |
|---|---|---|---|---|---|
| 1 | South Korea | 13 | 2 | 5 | 20 |
| 2 | Colombia | 6 | 2 | 0 | 8 |
| 3 | United States | 5 | 6 | 3 | 14 |
| 4 | Netherlands | 3 | 3 | 0 | 6 |
| 5 | Italy | 2 | 3 | 4 | 9 |
| 6 | Denmark | 2 | 3 | 2 | 7 |
| 7 | Russia | 1 | 3 | 2 | 6 |
| 8 | Chinese Taipei | 1 | 2 | 6 | 9 |
| 9 | Turkey | 1 | 2 | 2 | 5 |
| 10 | France | 1 | 0 | 2 | 3 |
| 11 | Iran | 1 | 0 | 0 | 1 |
| 12 | India | 0 | 2 | 2 | 4 |
| 13 | Mexico | 0 | 2 | 1 | 3 |
| 14 | China | 0 | 2 | 0 | 2 |
| 15 | Spain | 0 | 1 | 1 | 2 |
| 16 | Great Britain | 0 | 1 | 0 | 1 |
| 16 | Japan | 0 | 1 | 0 | 1 |
| 16 | South Africa | 0 | 1 | 0 | 1 |
| 19 | Australia | 0 | 0 | 2 | 2 |
| 20 | Croatia | 0 | 0 | 1 | 1 |
| 20 | Indonesia | 0 | 0 | 1 | 1 |
| Totals (21 entries) | | 36 | 36 | 34 | 106 |
