= Choi Bo-min =

Choi Bo-min may refer to:

- Choi Bo-min (archer) (born 1984), South Korean compound archer
- Choi Bo-min (entertainer) (born 2000), South Korean singer, actor and host
