= Archery at the 2014 Asian Games – Women's team compound =

Women's team compound at the 2014 Asian Games
- Venue: Gyeyang Asiad Archery Field
- Dates: 23–27 September 2014
- Competitors: 33 from 9 nations

Medalists
gold medal	South Korea; Choi Bo-min, Kim Yun-hee, Seok Ji-hyun
silver medal	Chinese Taipei; Chen Li-ju, Huang I-jou, Wu Ting-ting
bronze medal	India; Trisha Deb, Purvasha Shende, Jyothi Surekha

The women's team compound archery competition at the 2014 Asian Games in Incheon was held from 23 to 27 September at Gyeyang Asiad Archery Field. Each team consisted of the highest ranked three athletes from the qualification round.

A total of 9 teams participated in the qualification round with all 9 teams progressing to the knockout round.

== Schedule ==
All times are Korea Standard Time (UTC+09:00)

Date	Time	Event
Tuesday, 23 September 2014	14:30	Ranking round
Thursday, 25 September 2014	09:30	1/8 eliminations
Thursday, 25 September 2014	10:00	Quarterfinals
Thursday, 25 September 2014	14:00	Semifinals
Saturday, 27 September 2014	10:00	Bronze medal match
Saturday, 27 September 2014	10:25	Gold medal match

== Results ==
=== Ranking round ===
Rank	Team	Half		Total	10s	Xs
Rank	Team	1st	2nd	Total	10s	Xs
1	South Korea (KOR)	1039	1043	2082	143	56
	Choi Bo-min	346	349	695	49	21
	Kim Yun-hee	345	347	692	46	12
	Seok Ji-hyun	348	347	695	48	23
	Youn So-jung	~~328~~	~~330~~	~~658~~	~~26~~	~~8~~
2	India (IND)	1016	1031	2047	115	45
	Trisha Deb	341	346	687	42	14
	Lily Chanu Paonam	~~342~~	~~335~~	~~677~~	~~34~~	~~10~~
	Purvasha Shende	336	344	680	37	14
	Jyothi Surekha	339	341	680	36	17
3	Chinese Taipei (TPE)	1018	1025	2043	119	53
	Chen Li-ju	337	344	681	39	20
	Huang I-jou	338	345	683	43	17
	Wen Ning-meng	~~334~~	~~342~~	~~676~~	~~36~~	~~14~~
	Wu Ting-ting	343	336	679	37	16
4	Iran (IRI)	1012	1024	2036	110	40
	Minoo Abedi	~~331~~	~~327~~	~~658~~	~~27~~	~~7~~
	Sakineh Ghasempour	344	338	682	41	16
	Maryam Ranjbar	334	340	674	33	10
	Shabnam Sarlak	334	346	680	36	14
5	Indonesia (INA)	1018	1016	2034	107	40
	Della Adisty Handayani	~~333~~	~~326~~	~~659~~	~~27~~	~~7~~
	Sri Ranti	336	345	681	38	18
	Rona Siska Sari	336	334	670	30	12
	Dellie Threesyadinda	346	337	683	39	10
6	Philippines (PHI)	999	1019	2018	104	35
	Amaya Cojuangco	329	345	674	34	7
	Joann Tabañag	332	336	668	32	9
	Abbigail Tindugan	338	338	676	38	19
7	Kazakhstan (KAZ)	1001	1004	2005	98	31
	Nina Fisher	335	336	671	37	11
	Bibigul Izbassarova	329	336	665	28	9
	Viktoriya Polonskaya	337	332	669	33	11
	Svetlana Shepotko	~~333~~	~~329~~	~~662~~	~~30~~	~~10~~
8	Laos (LAO)	974	977	1951	71	24
	Daophasouk Detsone	330	319	649	25	8
	Phone Khamkeo	329	337	666	27	10
	Bouppha Thana	315	321	636	19	6
9	Mongolia (MGL)	896	887	1783	39	16
	Battsetsegiin Batdulam	307	321	628	15	7
	Erdenechimegiin Bolormaa	309	295	604	16	7
	Oyuuny Buyanjargal	280	271	551	8	2

=== Knockout round ===
1/8 eliminations
9	Mongolia	211
8	Laos	217

Quarterfinals
1	South Korea	238
8	Laos	215
5	Indonesia	222
4	Iran	227
3	Chinese Taipei	226
6	Philippines	215
7	Kazakhstan	223^{25}
2	India	223^{29}

Semifinals
1	South Korea	229
4	Iran	222
3	Chinese Taipei	226
2	India	224

Gold medal match
1	South Korea	229
3	Chinese Taipei	226
Bronze medal match
4	Iran	217
2	India	224
