= Archery at the 2016 Summer Olympics – Qualification =

There were 128 qualifying places available for archery at the 2016 Summer Olympics: 64 for men and 64 for women.

Each National Olympic Committee (NOC) is permitted to enter a maximum of six competitors, three per gender. NOCs that qualify teams for a particular gender were able to send a three-member team to the team event and also have each member compete in the individual event. There were 12 team spots for each gender, thus qualifying 36 individuals through team qualification. All other NOCs may earn a maximum of one quota place per gender for the individual events.

Six places are reserved for Brazil as the host nation, and a further six will be decided by the Tripartite Commission. The remaining 116 places are then allocated through a qualification process, in which archers earned quota places for their respective NOCs, though not necessarily for themselves.

To be eligible to participate in the Olympic Games after the NOC has obtained a quota place, all archers must have achieved the following minimum qualification score (MQS):

- Men: 70m round of 630
- Women: 70m round of 600

The MQS must have been achieved between 26 July 2015 (starting at the 2015 World Archery Championships) and 11 July 2016 at a registered World Archery event.

== Summary ==
Nation	Men		Women		Total
Nation	Individual	Team	Individual	Team	Athletes
Australia	3	X	1		4
Austria			1		1
Azerbaijan			1		1
Bangladesh			1		1
Belarus	1				1
Belgium	1				1
Bhutan			1		1
Brazil	3	X	3	X	6
Canada	1		1		2
Chile	1				1
China	3	X	3	X	6
Colombia	1		3	X	4
Cuba	1				1
Dominican Republic			1		1
Egypt	1		1		2
Estonia			1		1
Fiji	1				1
Finland	1		1		2
France	3	X			3
Georgia			3	X	3
Germany	1		1		2
Greece			1		1
Great Britain	1		1		2
India	1		3	X	4
Indonesia	3	X	1		4
Iran			1		1
Italy	3	X	3	X	6
Ivory Coast	1				1
Japan	1		3	X	4
Kazakhstan	1		1		2
Kenya			1		1
Libya	1				1
Malawi	1				1
Malaysia	3	X			3
Mexico	1		3	X	4
Moldova			1		1
Mongolia	1				1
Myanmar			1		1
Nepal	1				1
Netherlands	3	X			3
North Korea			1		1
Norway	1				1
Poland			1		1
Russia			3	X	3
Slovakia	1		1		2
South Korea	3	X	3	X	6
Spain	3	X	1		4
Sweden			1		1
Chinese Taipei	3	X	3	X	6
Thailand	1				1
Tonga	1		1		2
Turkey	1		1		2
Ukraine	1		3	X	4
United States	3	X	1		4
Venezuela	1		1		2
Zimbabwe	1				1
Total: 56 NOCs	64	12	64	12	128

== Timeline ==
Event	Date	Venue
2015 World Archery Championships	July 27 – August 2, 2015	(Denmark) Copenhagen
2015 Asian Archery Championships	November 1–9, 2015	(Thailand) Bangkok
2016 African Archery Championships	January 28–31, 2016	(Namibia) Windhoek
2016 Oceanian Archery Championships	April 8–16, 2016	(Tonga) Nuku'alofa
2016 Pan American Archery Qualifier	May 8–9, 2016	(Colombia) Medellín
2016 European Archery Championships	May 23–29, 2016	(United Kingdom) Nottingham
2016 Archery World Cup Stage	June 13–18, 2016	(Turkey) Antalya

== Men's events ==
Event	Location	Athletes per NOC	Total places	Qualified
Team
Host nation	—	3	3	Brazil
2015 World Archery Championships	(Denmark) Copenhagen	3	24	Australia; China; Italy; South Korea; Netherlands; Spain; Chinese Taipei; United States
2016 Archery World Cup Stage	(Turkey) Antalya	3	9	Indonesia; France; Malaysia
Individual
2015 World Archery Championships	(Denmark) Copenhagen	1	7*	Canada; Colombia; Germany; India; Japan; Ukraine; Venezuela
2015 Asian Archery Championships	(Thailand) Bangkok	1	2*	Mongolia; Kazakhstan
2016 African Archery Championships	(Namibia) Windhoek	1	3	Egypt; ~~South Africa~~^{[b]} Zimbabwe; Ivory Coast
2016 Oceanian Championships	(Tonga) Nuku'alofa	1	2	Fiji; Tonga
2016 Pan American Championships	(Colombia) Medellín	1	3	Mexico; ~~El Salvador~~^{[a]} Chile; Cuba
2016 European Championships	(United Kingdom) Nottingham	1	3	Turkey; Finland; Great Britain
2016 Archery World Cup Stage	(Turkey) Antalya	1	5*	Belarus; Belgium; Norway; Slovakia; Thailand
Tripartite Commission	—	1	3	Libya; Malawi; Nepal
Total			64	

* Eight individual spots were initially available at the World Championships and three more at the Asian Championships. Those spots taken by Indonesia and Malaysia later won team places in the team recurve at the Antalya leg of the Archery World Cup, releasing two further individual quota places to be awarded in the same meet.

== Women's events ==
Event	Location	Athletes per NOC	Total places	Qualified
Team
Host nation	—	3	3	Brazil
2015 World Archery Championships	(Denmark) Copenhagen	3	24	China; Colombia; Georgia; India; Japan; South Korea; Mexico; Russia
2016 Archery World Cup Stage	(Turkey) Antalya	3	9	Ukraine; Italy; Chinese Taipei
Individual
2015 World Archery Championships	(Denmark) Copenhagen	1	5*	Austria; Germany; Indonesia; Poland; United States
2015 Asian Archery Championships	(Thailand) Bangkok	1	3	North Korea; Iran; Kazakhstan
2016 African Archery Championships	(Namibia) Windhoek	1	2	~~Ivory Coast~~; Egypt; Kenya
2016 Oceania Championships	(Tonga) Nuku'alofa	1	2	Australia; Tonga
2016 Pan American Championships	(Colombia) Medellín	1	3	Venezuela; Canada; Dominican Republic
2016 European Championships	(United Kingdom) Nottingham	1	3	Turkey; Slovakia; Azerbaijan
2016 Archery World Cup Stage	(Turkey) Antalya	1	7*	Estonia; Finland; Great Britain; Moldova; Spain; Sweden; Greece
Tripartite Commission	—	1	3	Bangladesh; Bhutan; Myanmar
Total			64	

* Eight individual spots were initially available at the World Championships. Three of those spots were taken by Ukraine, Italy, and Chinese Taipei. Those NOCs later won team places in the team recurve at the Antalya leg of the Archery World Cup, releasing three further individual quota places to be awarded in the same meet.

== Notes ==
- ^{a} El Salvador's Óscar Ticas, who secured a quota place with a fourth-place finish in the World Archery Americas CQT, was suspended after his urine samples from a Guatemala World Ranking Event in March 2016 revealed the presence of a banned substance. As a result, El Salvador's Olympic license was redistributed to Cuba's Adrian Puentes.
- ^{b} The South African Sports Confederation and Olympic Committee's policy is only to take up Olympic qualification spots earned in global competitions rather than African or regional events. Thus Terence van Moerkerken's place was vacated and taken by Rene Kouassi of Ivory Coast.
