= 2015 World Archery Championships – Recurve mixed team =

2015 World Archery Championships
Men	Recurve	Compound
Women	Recurve	Compound
Team	Men's recurve	Men's compound
Team	Women's recurve	Women's compound
Mixed team	Recurve	Compound

The mixed team recurve competition at the 2015 World Archery Championships took place from 26 July to 2 August in Copenhagen, Denmark.

A record 67 countries entered at least one archer each into the men's and women's competitions, thus becoming eligible for the mixed team competition. The combined totals of the highest placed archers for each gender from each country in the qualification round were added together, and the 16 teams with the highest combined scores competed in the elimination rounds.

== Schedule ==
All times are UTC+01:00.

Date	Time	Phase
27 July	09:00	Qualification
28 July	16:30	1/8, QF, and SF Eliminations
2 August	15:00	Medal matches

== Qualification round ==
Pre-tournament world rankings ('WR') are taken from the 18 July 2015 World Archery Rankings.

Qualified for eliminations

Rank	Nation	Name	Score	WR
1	South Korea	Ki Bo-bae; Ku Bon-chan	1325	1
2	Chinese Taipei	Lin Shih-chia; Kuo Cheng-wei	1323	5
3	Italy	Natalia Valeeva; Mauro Nespoli	1318	9
4	China	Zhu Jueman; Gu Xuesong	1315	4
5	Japan	Kaori Kawanaka; Takaharu Furukawa	1309	6
6	Ukraine	Veronika Marchenko; Markiyan Ivashko	1308	13
7	Spain	Adriana Martín; Antonio Fernández	1305	17
8	Mexico	Alejandra Valencia; Juan René Serrano	1304	2
9	Germany	Karina Winter; Christian Weiss	1301	11
10	India	Deepika Kumari; Rahul Banerjee	1298	8
11	Georgia	Khatuna Narimanidze; Lasha Pkhakadze	1295	12
12	North Korea	Choe Ok-sil; Jon Chol	1294	21
13	United States	La Nola Pritchard; Brady Ellison	1292	7
14	Moldova	Alexandra Mîrca; Dan Olaru	1290	34
15	Russia	Inna Stepanova; Alexander Kozhin	1289	3
16	Australia	Semra Lingard; Taylor Worth	1283	44
17	Denmark	Maja Jager; Casper Lauridsen	1282	14
18	Colombia	Ana Rendón; Daniel Betancur	1280	20
19	Sweden	Elin Kattstrom; Jonas Lennart Andersson	1279	55
20	France	Laura Ruggieri; Lucas Daniel	1279	16
21	Poland	Karina Lipiarska; Pawel Marzec	1279	24
22	Belarus	Karyna Dziominskaya; Alexander Liahushev	1279	10
23	Cuba	Maydenia Sarduy; Juan Carlos Stevens	1279	27
24	Kazakhstan	Aruzhan Abdrazak; Denis Gankin	1277	30
25	Netherlands	Esther Deden; Sjef van den Berg	1277	26
26	Brazil	Larissa Feitosa Da Costa Rodrigues; Marcus Vinicius D'Almeida	1276	18
27	Mongolia	Miroslava Danzandorj; Jantsan Gantugs	1275	36
28	Turkey	Yasemin Anagöz; Mete Gazoz	1274	22
29	United Kingdom	Naomi Folkard; Patrick Huston	1273	15
30	Indonesia	Ika Yuliana Rochmawati; Riau Ega Agatha	1272	19
31	Venezuela	Leidys Brito; Elías Malavé	1272	28
32	Finland	Taru Kuoppa; Antti Tekoniemi	1270	33
33	Romania	Simona Bancila; Andrei Danila	1268	40
34	Slovakia	Alexandra Longová; Boris Baláž	1266	58
35	Canada	Kateri Vrakking; Jay Lyon	1263	25
36	Slovenia	Ana Umer; Klemen Štrajhar	1263	23
37	Iran	Melika Abdolkarimi; Sadegh Ashrafi	1262	42
38	Bangladesh	Shamoli Ray; Ruman Shana	1258	41
39	Austria	Laurence Baldauff; Alexander Bertschler	1249	62
40	Greece	Evangelia Psarra; Alexandros Karageorgiou	1239	72
41	Malaysia	Nur Afisa Abdul Halil; Khairul Anuar Mohamad	1238	36
42	Bulgaria	Dobromira Danailova; Yavor Hristov	1238	56
43	Switzerland	Celine Schobinger; Adrian Faber	1237	60
44	South Africa	Karen Hultzer; Marco Di Matteo	1237	66
45	Azerbaijan	Olga Senyuk; Taras Senyuk	1236	46
46	Bhutan	Karma; Kinley Tshering	1233	70
47	Egypt	Amira Mansour; Ahmed El-Nemr	1231	38
48	Czech Republic	Zuzana Panikova; Petr Heinrich	1222	65
49	Philippines	Rachelle Anne De La Cruz; Florante F. Matan	1221	54
50	Norway	Anna Stanieczek; Simen Burhol	1219	77
51	Argentina	Ximena Mendiberry; Hugo Robles	1216	43
52	Estonia	Laura Nurmsalu; Jaanus Gross	1215	74
53	Cyprus	Elena Mousikou; Mimis El Helali	1212	77
54	Guatemala	Yesenia Valencia; Diego Castro	1196	31
55	Uzbekistan	Munira Nurmanova; Umerov Amet	1190	77
56	Lithuania	Dangeruta Nosaliene; Dalius Macernius	1169	77
57	New Zealand	Sarah Fuller; Robert Peterson	1166	77
58	Latvia	Anete Kreicberga; Janis Apsitis	1137	75
59	Iceland	Olof Gyda Risten Svansdottir; Sigurjón Atli Sigurðsson	1121	n/a
60	United States Virgin Islands	Amanda Warehime; William Charles Coles	959	61
	Israel	Matan Yaeger; Guy Matzkin	DNS	n/a
	Tonga	Lusitania Tatafu; Arne Jensen	DNS	n/a

== Elimination rounds ==
1st round
1	South Korea	1	1	1	2
16	Australia	1	1	1	0
9	Germany	2	0	0	0
8	Mexico	0	2	2	2
5	Japan	2	1	2
12	North Korea	0	1	0
13	United States	2	2	0	0	0
4	China	0	0	2	2	1
3	Italy	2	0	1	2
14	Moldova	0	2	1	0
11	Georgia	2	2	0	2
6	Ukraine	0	0	2	0
7	Spain	0	2	2	0	0
10	India	2	0	0	2	1
15	Russia	1	1	2	0	0
2	Chinese Taipei	1	1	0	2	1

Quarterfinals
1	South Korea	2	0	0	2	1
8	Mexico	0	2	2	0	0
5	Japan	1	0	2	0
4	China	1	2	0	2
3	Italy	0	0	0
11	Georgia	2	2	2
10	India	2	0	2	0	0
2	Chinese Taipei	0	2	0	2	1

Semifinals
1	South Korea	0	2	0	2	1
4	China	2	0	2	0	0
11	Georgia	0	0	0
2	Chinese Taipei	2	2	2

Finals
1	South Korea	2	0	2	0	1
2	Chinese Taipei	0	2	0	2	0
Third place
4	China	0	1	2	2
11	Georgia	2	1	0	0
