= Valentine de Giuli =

Swiss archer (born 1990)

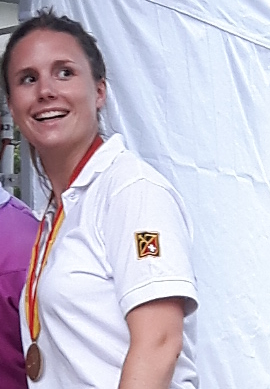
- de Giuli in 2017

Personal information
- Nationality: Swiss
- Born: 2 October 1990 (age 35) Geneva, Switzerland
- Parent(s): Marie-Thérèse de Giuli; Jean-Noël de Giuli
- Relative: Clémentine de Giuli (sister)

Sport
- Country: Switzerland
- Sport: Archery

Valentine de Giuli (born 2 October 1990) is a Swiss archer.

== Biography ==
De Giuli was born on 2 October 1990 in Geneva to archers Marie-Thérèse de Giuli and Jean-Noël de Giuli. She is a sister of the archer Clémentine de Giuli.

She began archery in 1999 and made her international debut in 2005. She has been a member of the Swiss national team since 2009.

She has represented Switzerland in several international competitions, including the 2015 World Archery Championships, the 2017 Archery World Cup, and the 2017 World Archery Championships.
