= Trisha Deb =

Indian archer

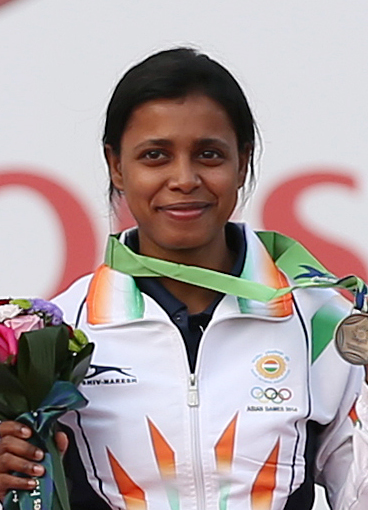

Personal information
- Born: 21 October 1991 (age 34) Kolkata, West Bengal, India

Sport
- Country: India
- Sport: Archery
Medal record
Women's compound archery
Representing India
World Championships
Silver medal – second place	2017 Mexico	Team
Asian Games
Bronze medal – third place	2014 Incheon	Individual
Bronze medal – third place	2014 Incheon	Team
Asian Championships
Gold medal – first place	2017 Dhaka	Team

Trisha Deb is an Indian archer.

She won the bronze medal at the 2014 Asian Games in Incheon in the women's individual compound archery event and in the women's team compound along with Purvasha Shende and Jyothi Surekha Vennam.

In 2017, she wins the silver medal in the women's team compound at the World Archery Championships.
