= Stara Krasnianka care house attack =

2022 attack in Luhansk Oblast, Ukraine

- Part of the Russian invasion of Ukraine
- Location: Stara Krasnianka, Luhansk Oblast, Ukraine
- Date: 11 March 2022
- Target: Nursing home
- Attack type: Shelling by a tank
- Deaths: 56
- Perpetrator: Russia-affiliated forces

The Stara Krasnianka care house attack took place on 11 March 2022 during the Russian invasion of Ukraine. On 7 March the Ukrainian armed forces occupied a care house in the village of Stara Krasnianka, near Kreminna, Luhansk Oblast, establishing a firing position and reportedly leaving the patients unevacuated due to the presence of mines. On 11 March 2022 pro-Russian separatist forces attacked the care house with heavy weapons while 71 patients with disabilities and 15 members of staff were still inside. A fire broke out and fifty six civilians died.

Ukraine officials accused the Russian forces of deliberately targeting a medical facility and forcefully deporting the survivors. On 29 June, a report of the OHCHR described the incident as an "emblematic" case of endangering civilians during the war.

== Events ==
As reported by OHCHR, on 7 March, Ukrainian soldiers took up positions inside the strategically located care house in the village of Stara Krasnianka, near Kreminna in Luhansk Oblast and set up a firing base there with the evacuation of the residents and staff reportedly impossible due to mining.

In the preceding days, the Ukrainian armed forces had allegedly mined the surrounding area and blocked roads, which made the evacuation impossible, as requested by the management of the care home. On 9 March, the Ukrainian forces based at the care house engaged in the first exchange of fire with pro-Russian separatists without casualties among the civilian residents of the house. It is unclear which side was the first to open fire. On March 11, dozens of elderly and disabled patients, some of them bedridden, were in the care house without water or electricity, along with the Ukrainian soldiers.

On 11 March, Russia-affiliated armed groups attacked the care house again and used heavy weapons while patients and staff were still inside. The attack caused a fire that spread throughout the facility and killed the patients who could not move. A group of residents fled the house, walked for 5 kilometres in the forest and was given assistance by pro-Russian separatists. 22 patients survived the attack but as of 29 June the exact number of persons killed remains unknown. On 20 March Serhiy Haidai, governor of Luhansk Oblast, reported 56 victims. At the time of the attack, 71 patients with disabilities and 15 staff were at the house.

== Aftermath ==
In the aftermath of the attack, the Ukrainian ombudsperson Denisova stated that more than 50 elderly people in the care home had been deliberately fired upon by a tank, and called the attack a "crime against humanity" by "racist occupation forces". Serhiy Haidai, governor of Luhansk Oblast, reported 56 victims from the attack, which he called "cynical and deliberate". He also said that 15 survivors had been kidnapped by the occupiers and taken to a geriatric hospital in Svatove, at the time under separatist control. On 20 March Ukraine's prosecutor general announced war crimes charges against Russia for the attack on a medical facility, and the US Embassy in Ukraine stated that Russia would bear responsibility for the crime.

In the first half of April, a Russian Telegram channel published a video from the destroyed nursing home, which showed many burned bodies, ammunition and weapons among the ruins. The Washington Post "verified the location of the new video and some of the images by comparing them with multiple prewar archive videos and photographs of the nursing home".

Ukraine’s prosecutor general reported preliminary findings that matched Haidai's account; his office announced war crimes charges against Russia for the attack. The area was under Russian control, and Ukrainian investigators had been unable to access the site. On 29 June the OHCHR published a report on the situation of human rights in Ukraine disclosing more information on the attack. According to the report, Ukraine's armed forces bear a significant responsibility for what happened because "a few days before the March 11 attack, Ukrainian soldiers took up positions inside the nursing home, effectively making the building a target."

== See also ==
- War crimes in the 2022 Russian invasion of Ukraine
