= Kreminna =

City in Luhansk Oblast, Ukraine

Kreminna Кремінна
- City
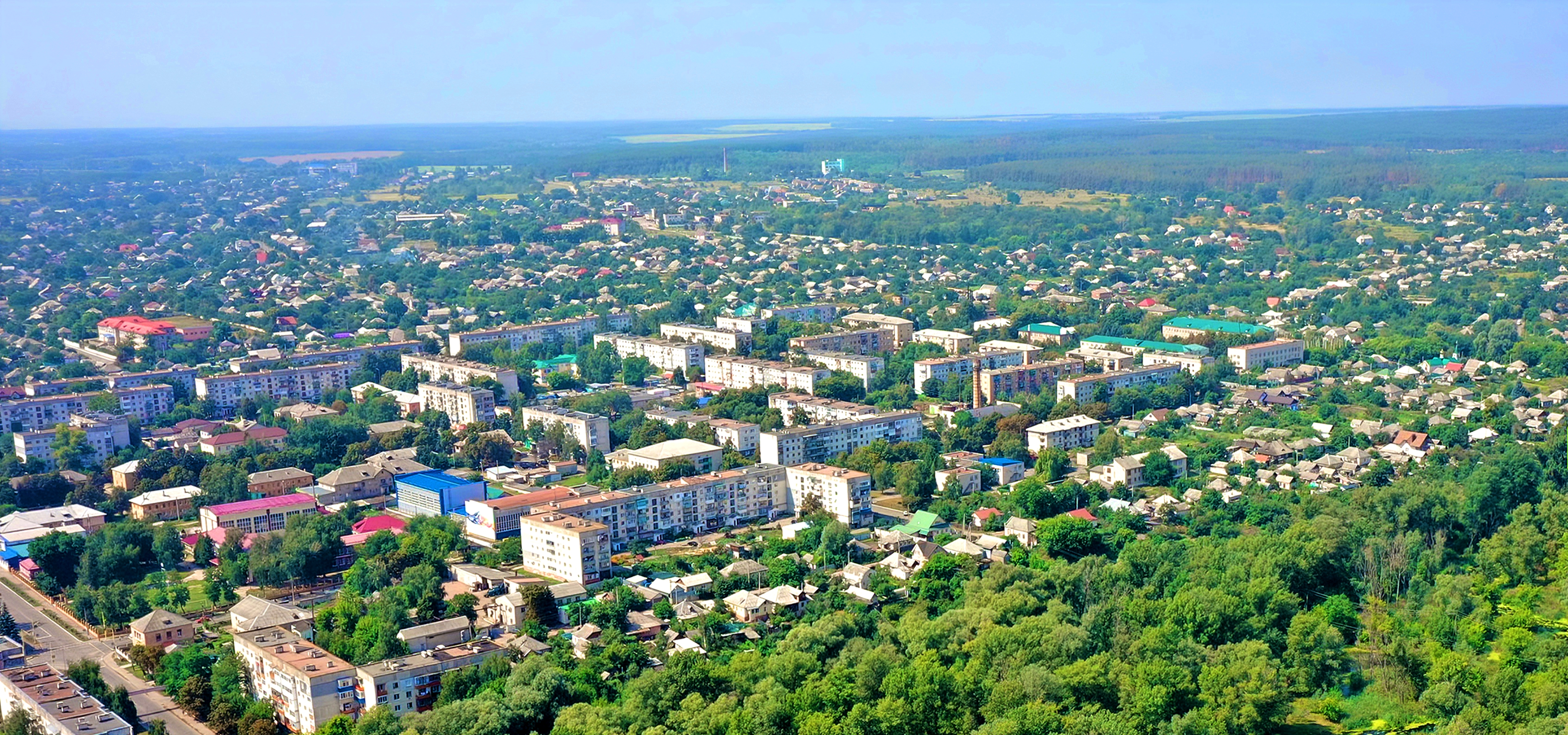
- General view of Kreminna

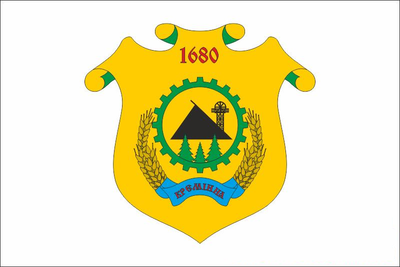
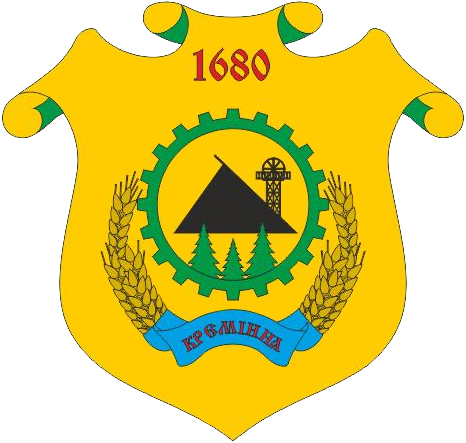
- Flag Coat of arms
- Interactive map of Kreminna
- Location within Luhansk Oblast Location within Ukraine
- Coordinates: 49.05°N 38.2167°E
- Country: Ukraine
- Oblast: Luhansk Oblast
- Raion: Sievierodonetsk Raion
- Hromada: Kreminna urban hromada
- Founded: 1680
- City status: 1938

Government
  - Mayor: Yuriy Prokopenko

Area
  - Total: 15.72 km^{2} (6.07 sq mi)

Population (2022)
  - Total: 18,116
  - Density: 1,152/km^{2} (2,985/sq mi)
- Time zone: UTC+2 (EET)
  - Summer (DST): UTC+3 (EEST)
- Area code: (+380)
- Vehicle registration: BB / 13
- Climate: Dfb

Kreminna (Ukrainian: Кремінна; Russian: Кременная, romanized: Kremennaya) is a city in Sievierodonetsk Raion, Luhansk Oblast, eastern Ukraine. Prior to 2020, it served as the administrative center of former Kreminna Raion. Its population was estimated at 18,116, as of January 2022. It is located in the historic region of Sloboda Ukraine.

Following the Russian invasion of Ukraine that was launched in February 2022, the city has been the scene of heavy fighting, with both Ukraine and Russia claiming control at times. Russia has claimed it as part of the Luhansk People's Republic following its declared annexation of the region in September 2022.

== History ==
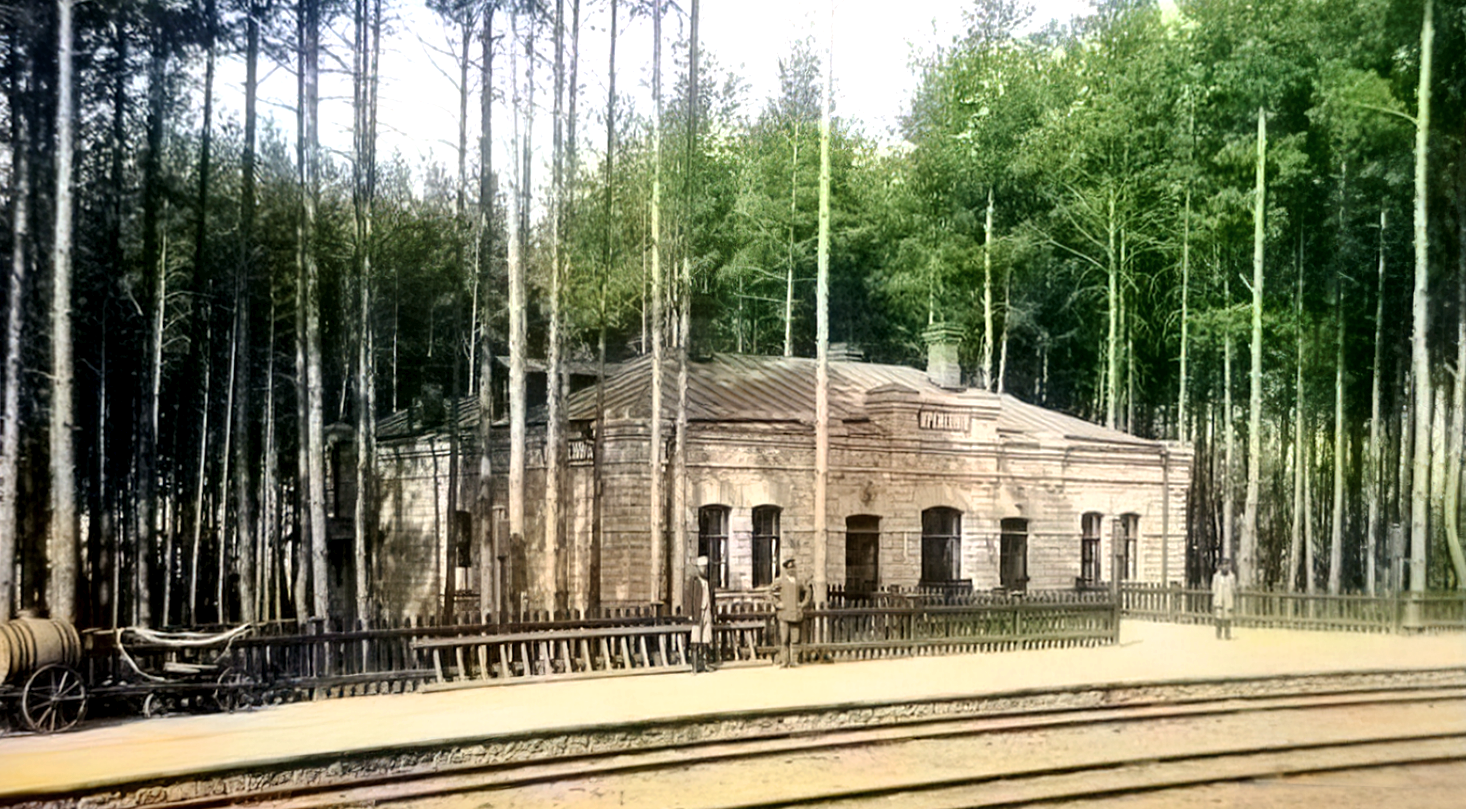
Railway station in the 19th century

Kreminna was founded in 1680.

During the Ukrainian War of Independence, from 1917 to 1920, it passed between various factions. Afterwards, it was administratively part of the Donets Governorate of Ukraine. Kreminna acquired the status of a city in 1938.

A local newspaper has been published in the city since December 1943.

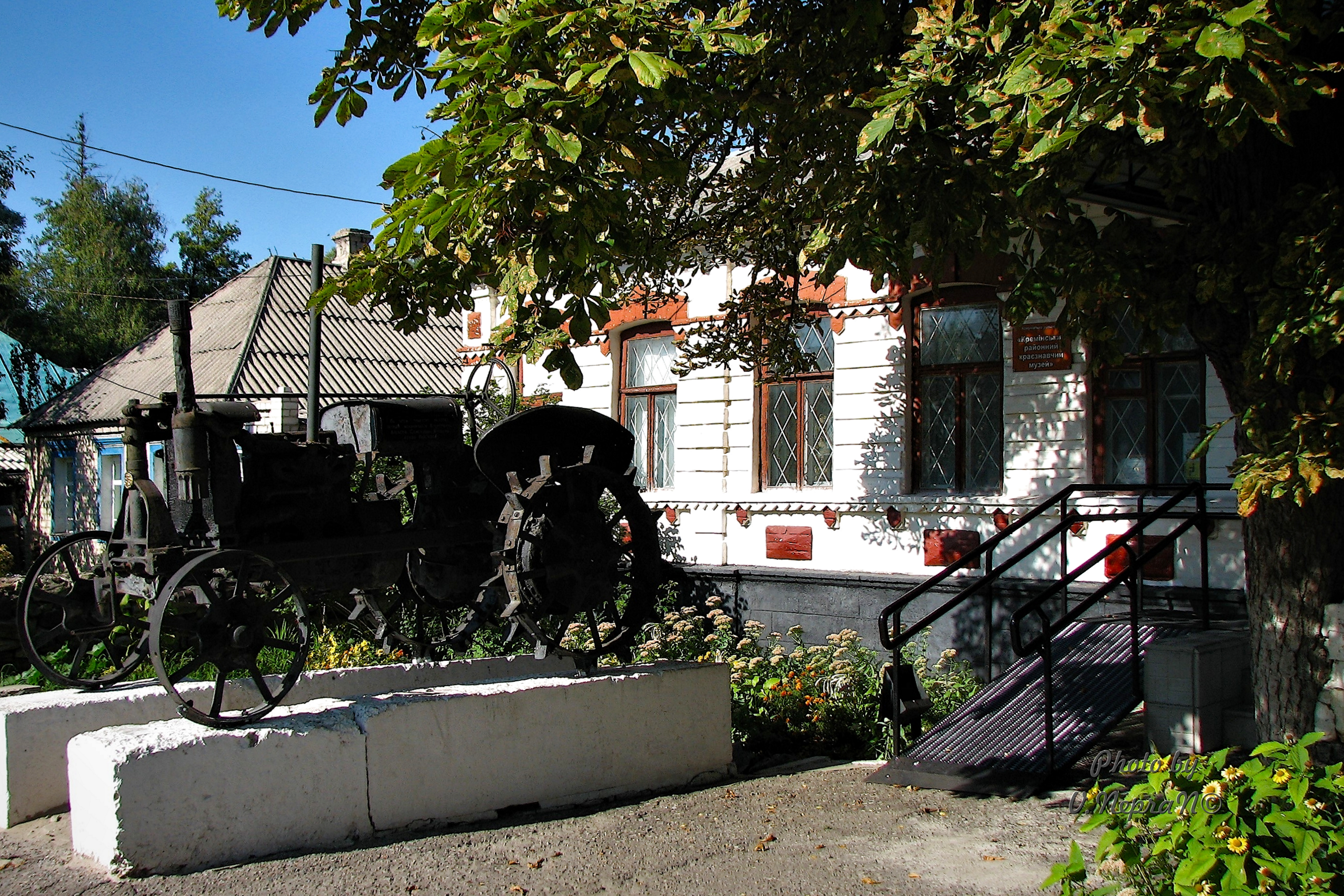
Local history museum

=== Russo-Ukrainian War ===
In July 2014, fighting took place in the city during the war in Donbas. Kreminna remained under Ukrainian control.

In March 2022, during the Russian invasion of Ukraine, the pro-Russian mayor Volodymyr Struk who welcomed the Russian move, was found shot dead in the street after having been kidnapped from his home. Official advisor and a former deputy minister at the Ukrainian Ministry of Internal Affairs Anton Herashchenko said that Struk was judged under the Lynch Law. Herashchenko suggested that the mayor was murdered by "unknown patriots" as the Russian forces were 15 kilometers away from Kreminna.

On 11 March 2022, a residential care home for the elderly in Kreminna came under the fire of Russian tanks after Ukrainian armed forces set up a firing position there. According to Serhiy Haidai, the Ukrainian Governor of Luhansk Oblast, 56 elderly residents were killed and 15 others were taken by the Russian military to Svatove, a town under their control. Ukrainian emergency services and officials were unable to reach the incident scene due to ongoing fighting.

The town was the site of some of the first fighting of the battle of Donbas during the battle of Kreminna. On 18 April 2022, Russian and LNR troops entered the city of Kreminna, capturing it a few hours later after clashes with the Ukrainian Army. Haidai said "there were plans to evacuate the population," although due to heavy fighting it proved impossible. Haidai described the Russian forces as having "a huge amount of equipment".

On 13 September 2022, Haidai stated that Russian forces had fled Kreminna three days earlier, that the Ukrainian flag has been raised by local residents, but Ukrainian forces had not yet entered the town. However, on 14 September, Haidai stated that Russian troops had returned to Kreminna and "torn down the Ukrainian flag".

In early October 2022, the Luhansk Oblast campaign near the town was initiated.

In February 2023 the first recorded loss of a Russian BMPT Terminator was in a combat near Kreminna.

== Demographics ==
Ethnic groups in Kreminna
	percent
Ukrainians	83.41%
Russians	15.15%
Belarusians	0.60%
Armenians	0.16%
Tatars	0.05%

Native languages in Kreminna
Languages	percent
Ukrainian	77.1%
Russian	27.9%
Armenian	0.1%
Belarusian	0.1%
others	0.1%

== Notable people ==
- Yuriy Aharkov (born 1987), Ukrainian cyclist
- Olena Borysenko (born 1996), Ukrainian archer
