= Kreminna Raion =

Former subdivision of Luhansk Oblast, Ukraine

Kreminna Raion Кремінський район
- Raion
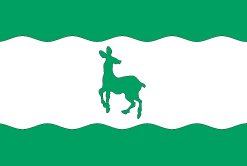
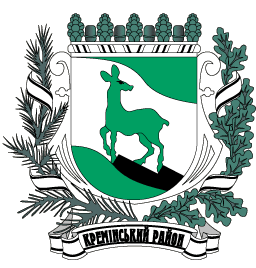
- Flag Coat of arms

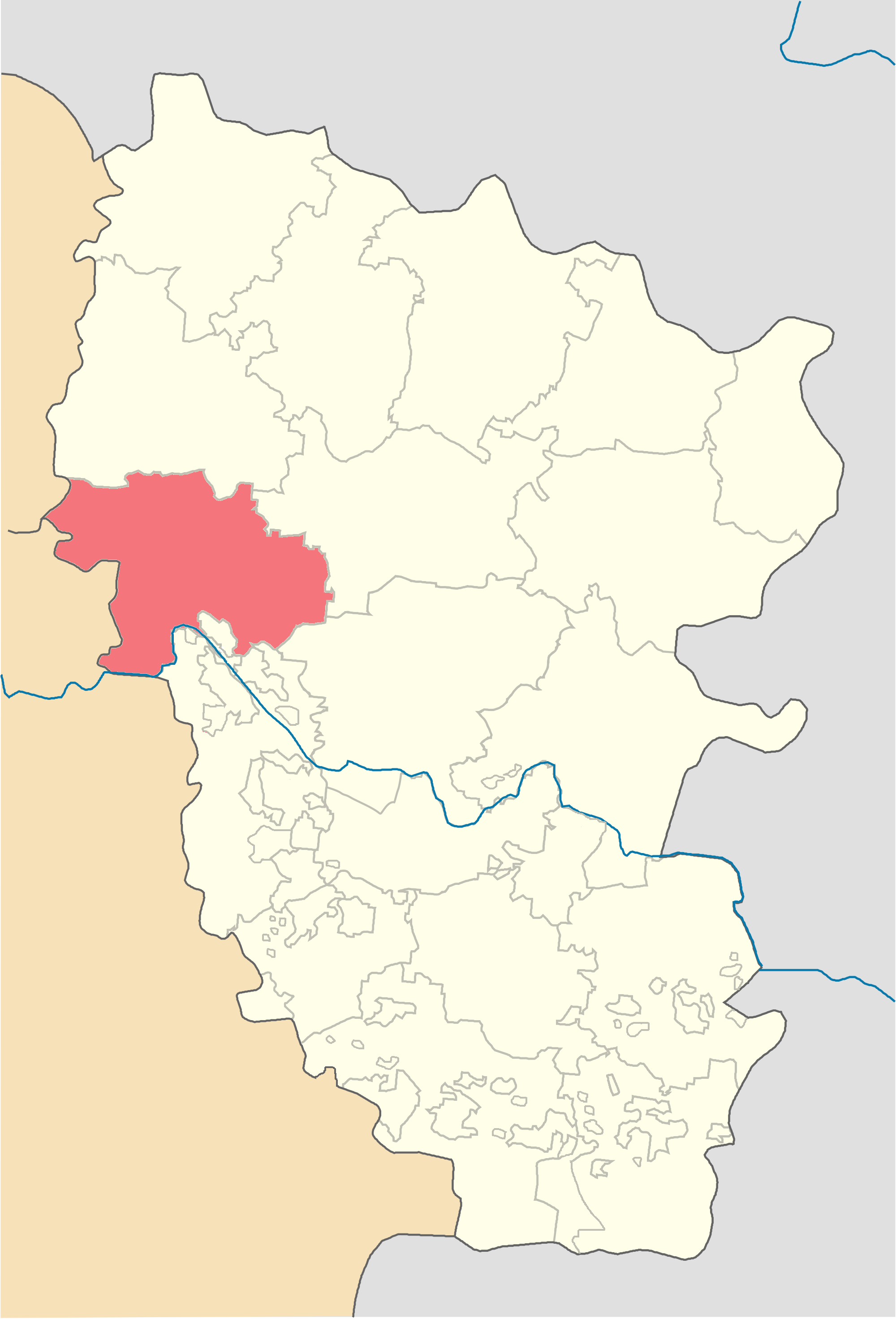
- Coordinates: 49°8′30″N 38°17′5″E
- Country: Ukraine
- Region: Luhansk Oblast
- Established: 1940
- Disestablished: 18 July 2020
- Admin. center: Kreminna
- Subdivisions: List: 1 — city councils; 1 — settlement councils; 16 — rural councils; Number of localities: 1 — cities; 1 — urban-type settlements; 32 — villages; 4 — rural settlements

Government
  - Governor: Yuriy Prokopenko

Area
  - Total: 1,627 km^{2} (628 sq mi)

Population (2020)
  - Total: 37,753 ▼
  - Density: 23.20/km^{2} (60.10/sq mi)
- Time zone: UTC+02:00 (EET)
  - Summer (DST): UTC+03:00 (EEST)
- Postal index: 92900—92943
- Area code: +380 6454
- Website: http://krem.loga.gov.ua

Melovsky Municipal District Меловский муниципальный округ (Russian)
- District

Other transcription(s)
  - Ukrainian: Міловський район
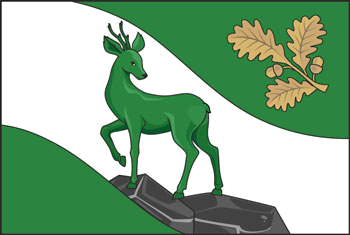
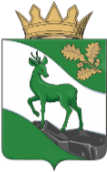
- Flag Coat of arms

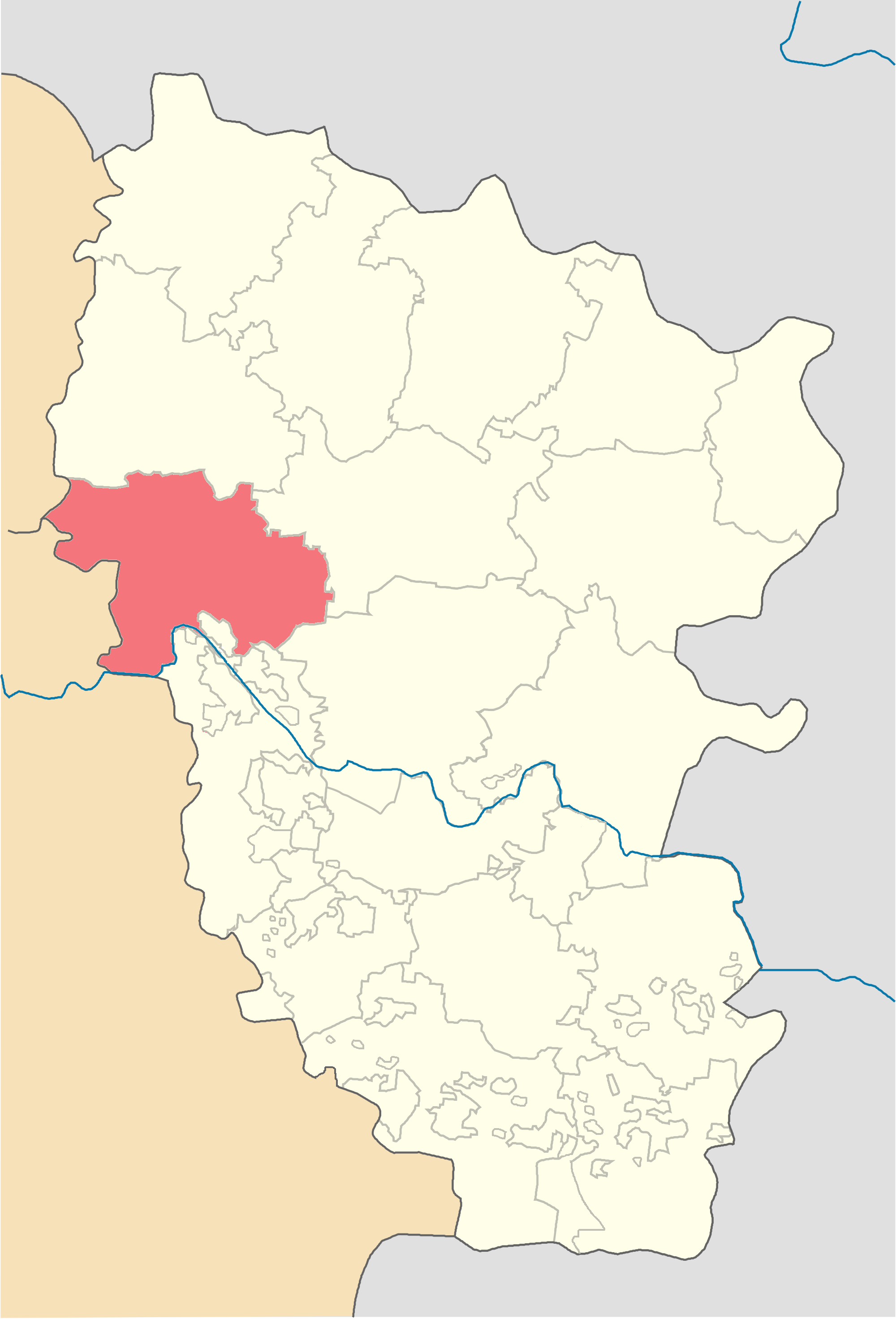
- Location of Kremensky District in the Luhansk People's Republic
- Coordinates: 49°8′30″N 38°17′5″E
- Country: Russia
- Federal subject: Luhansk People's Republic
- Established: 1940
- Administrative center: Kremennaya

Area
  - Total: 1,627 km^{2} (628 sq mi)
- Website: https://kremnaya.rf

Kreminna Raion (Ukrainian: Кремінський район) was a raion (district) of Luhansk Oblast in eastern Ukraine. The administrative center of the raion was the town of Kreminna. The raion was abolished on 18 July 2020 as part of the administrative reform of Ukraine, which reduced the number of raions of Luhansk Oblast to eight, of which only four were controlled by the government. The last estimate of the raion population was 37,753 (2020 est.).

== Demographics ==
As of the 2001 Ukrainian census:

Ethnicity

- Ukrainians: 85.1%
- Russians: 13.5%
- Belarusians: 0.5%
