= Ku Bon-chan =

South Korean archer (born 1993)

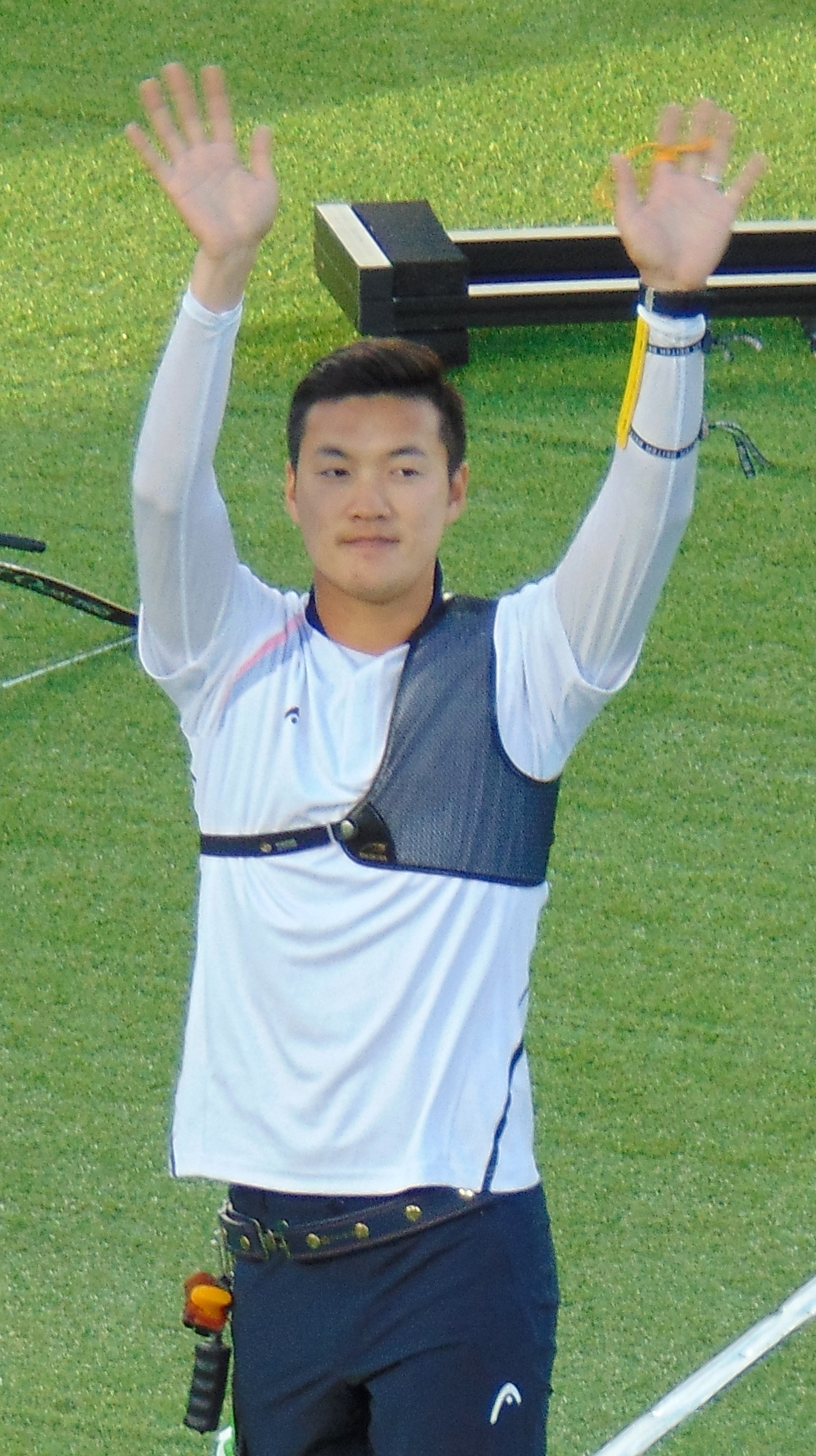
- Ku at the 2016 Summer Olympics

Personal information
- Native name: 구본찬
- Born: 31 January 1993 (age 33) Gyeongju, South Korea
- Height: 181 cm (5 ft 11 in)
- Weight: 84 kg (185 lb)

Sport
- Country: South Korea
- Sport: Archery
- Event: recurve
- Club: Andong National University
- Coached by: Park Chae-soon; Moon Hyung-Cheol (national)
Medal record
Men's recurve archery
Representing South Korea
Olympic Games
Gold medal – first place	2016 Rio de Janeiro	Team
Gold medal – first place	2016 Rio de Janeiro	Individual
World Championships
Gold medal – first place	2015 Copenhagen	Team
Gold medal – first place	2015 Copenhagen	Mixed team
Asian Games
Bronze medal – third place	2014 Incheon	Team
Asian Championships
Gold medal – first place	2013 Taipei	Team
Silver medal – second place	2013 Taipei	Mixed team
World Cup Final
Gold medal – first place	2016 Odense	Mixed team
Bronze medal – third place	2016 Odense	Individual
Summer Universiade
Gold medal – first place	2015 Gwangju	Team
Silver medal – second place	2015 Gwangju	Individual
- Updated on 13 August 2016

Ku Bon-chan (Korean: 구본찬, Korean pronunciation: [ku.bon.tɕʰan] or [ku] [pon.tɕʰan], born 31 January 1993) is a South Korean recurve archer. He won an individual and a team gold medal at the 2016 Olympics and two team gold medals at the 2015 World Championships.

== Career ==
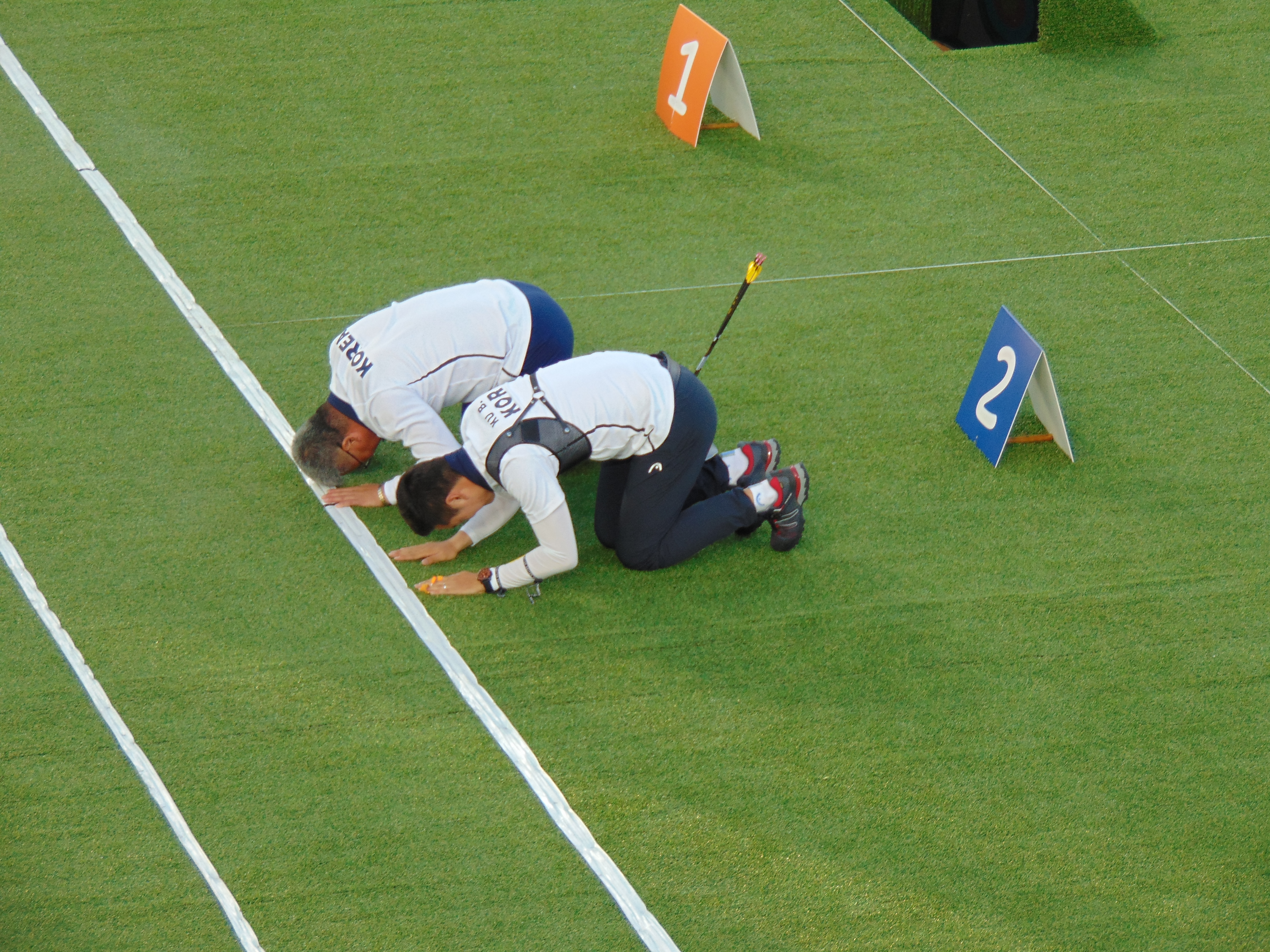
Ku Bon-chan with coach after winning the gold medal at the 2016 Olympics

He made his international debut at the 2014 Archery World Cup after having participated in numerous Asian competitions prior. Ku competed in the individual recurve event, team recurve event, and recurve mixed team event at the 2015 World Archery Championships in Copenhagen, Denmark, where he took home gold medals in the team recurve event and recurve mixed team event.

Ku represented South Korea in the men's team archery event and men's individual archery event at the 2016 Summer Olympics in Rio de Janeiro, Brazil. Ku and the South Korean team won the gold medal in the team event. Ku shot six consecutive perfect tens across three sets in the gold medal match against the United States. South Korea's victory against the United States marked the first time a South Korean archery team had beaten an archery team from the United States at the Olympics. In the men's individual archery event, Ku defeated Frenchman Jean-Charles Valladont in the final to win his second Olympic gold medal.
