= Choi Bo-min (archer) =

South Korean compound archer (born 1984)

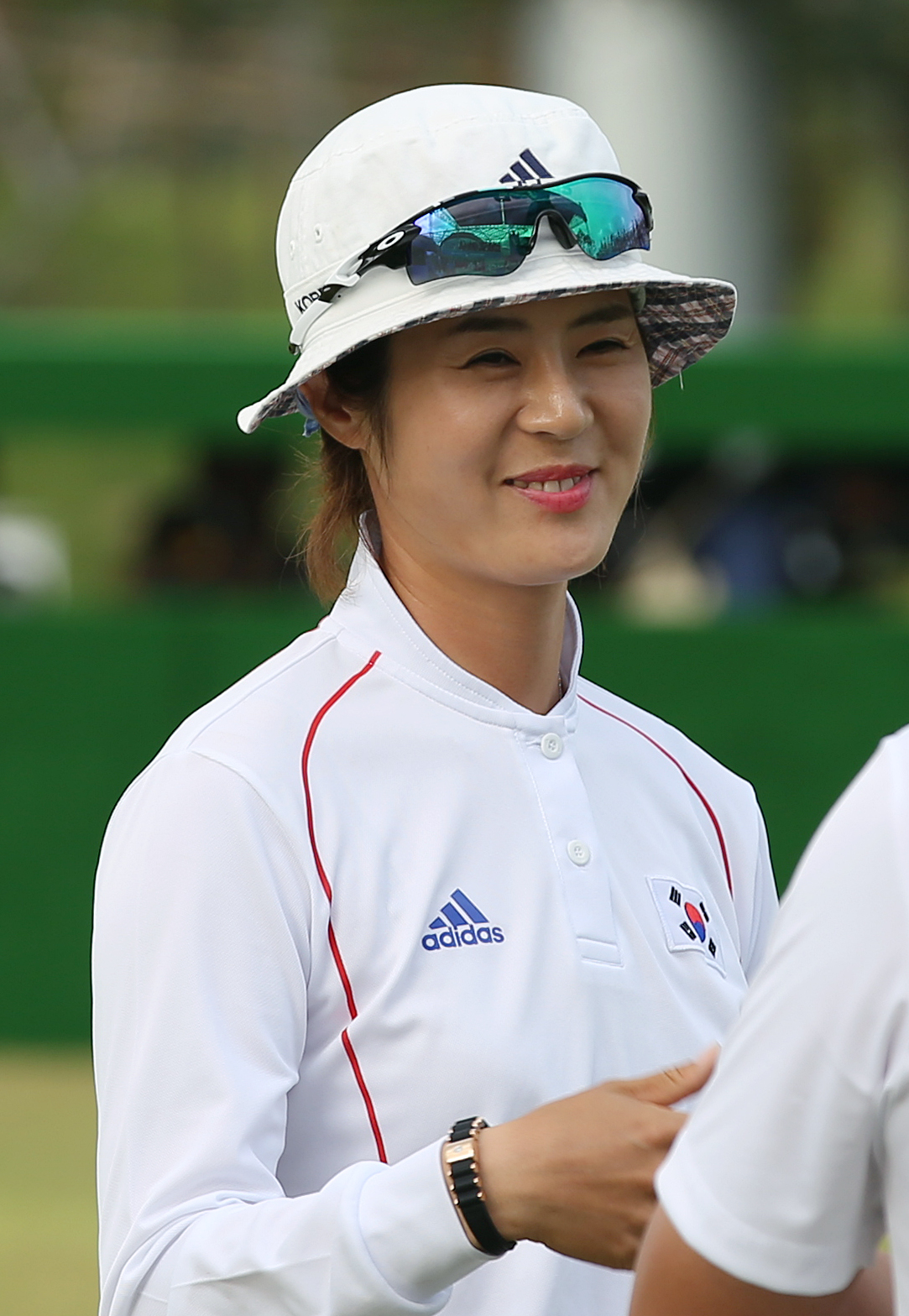
- Choi Bo-min at the 2014 Asian Games

Personal information
- Nationality: South Korean
- Born: Choi Eun-young 최은영

Korean name
- Hangul: 최보민
- Hanja: 崔輔珉
- RR: Choe Bomin
- MR: Ch'oe Pomin

Sport
- Country: South Korea
- Sport: Archery
Medal record
Women's compound archery
Representing South Korea
World Championships
| Gold medal – first place | 2007 Leipzig | Team |
| Bronze medal – third place | 2015 Copenhagen | Team |
| Bronze medal – third place | 2017 Mexico City | Team |
World Cup Final
| Silver medal – second place | 2007 Dubai | Individual |
Asian Games
| Gold medal – first place | 2014 Incheon | Individual |
| Gold medal – first place | 2014 Incheon | Team |
| Gold medal – first place | 2018 Jakarta–Palembang | Team |
Asian Championships
| Silver medal – second place | 2017 Dhaka | Individual |
| Silver medal – second place | 2017 Dhaka | Team |
| Bronze medal – third place | 2013 Taipei | Individual |
| Bronze medal – third place | 2013 Taipei | Team |

Choi Bo-min (Korean: 최보민; born 8 July 1984) is a South Korean compound archer and a former recurve archer.

She began training in archery in 1993 and made her international debut in 2002. In 2007 World Archery Championships, she won the gold medal in recurve women's team event.

She won two gold medals at the 2014 Asian Games in the women's individual event and women's team event alongside Kim Yun-hee and Seok Ji-hyun. She won another gold medal at the 2018 Asian Games in the women's team event alongside So Chae-won and Song Yun-soo.

She won bronze medals at the 2015 World Archery Championships in the women's team event and at the 2017 World Archery Championships in the women's team event.
