= 2015 World Archery Championships – Compound mixed team =

The mixed team compound competition at the 2015 World Archery Championships took place from 26 July to 1 August in Copenhagen, Denmark.

42 countries entered at least one archer each into the men's and women's competitions, thus becoming eligible for the mixed team competition. The combined totals of the highest placed archers for each gender from each country in the qualification round were added together, and the 16 teams with the highest combined scores competed in the elimination rounds.

== Schedule ==
All times are local (UTC+01:00).

Date	Time	Phase
26 July	tbc	Official practice
27 July	tbc	Qualification
28 July	tbc	1/8, QF, and SF Eliminations
1 August	15:00	Medal matches

== Qualification round ==
Pre-tournament world rankings ('WR') are taken from the 18 July 2015 World Archery Rankings.

Qualified for eliminations

Rank	Nation	Name	Score	WR
1	Colombia	Sara López; Camilo Cardona	1385	6
2	Denmark	Tanja Jensen; Martin Damsbo	1380	1
3	United States	Jamie Van Natta; Braden Gellenthien	1376	2
4	India	Jyothi Surekha Vennam; Abhishek Verma	1375	4
5	South Korea	Kim Yun-hee; Kim Jong-ho	1374	7
6	Venezuela	Jhoaneth Leal; Leandro Rojas	1371	29
7	Netherlands	Inge Van Caspel; Mike Schloesser	1364	8
8	South Africa	Sera Cornelius; Patrick Roux	1362	15
9	Croatia	Ivana Buden; Mario Vavro	1359	17
10	Russia	Albina Loginova; Alexander Dambaev	1359	3
11	France	Amelie Sancenot; Dominique Genet	1357	11
12	Mexico	Stephanie Sarai Salinas; Julio Ricardo Fierro	1355	13
13	Italy	Marcella Tonioli; Sergio Pagni	1355	5
14	Spain	Andrea Marcos; Alberto Blazquez	1353	42
15	Norway	Laila Fevang Marzouk; Morten Bøe	1352	28
16	Slovenia	Toja Cerne; Dejan Sitar	1352	10
17	United Kingdom	Naomi Jones; Adam Ravenscroft	1350	18
18	Turkey	Yeşim Bostan; Demir Elmaağaçlı	1349	9
19	Iran	Sakineh Ghasempour; Esmaeil Ebadi	1349	16
20	Sweden	Helen Forsberg; Carl-Henrik Gidenskold	1347	38
21	Australia	Sherry Gale; Robert Timms	1346	33
22	Canada	Fiona McClean; Kevin Tataryn	1346	25
23	Germany	Janine Meissner; Marcus Laube	1343	12
24	Poland	Katarzyna Szalanska; Jan Wojtas	1341	19
25	Austria	Silvia Barckholt; Michael Matzner	1337	42
26	Ukraine	Viktoriya Diakova; Roman Vinogradov	1337	30
27	Belgium	Sarah Prieels; Julien Depoitier	1334	14
28	New Zealand	Barbara Scott; Shaun Teasdale	1327	64
29	Switzerland	Janine Hunsperger; Roman Haefelfinger	1322	42
30	Japan	Yumiko Honda; Yuta Yamamoto	1321	64
31	Finland	Tiina Karkkainen; Mikko Juutilainen	1321	64
32	Indonesia	Dellie Threesyadinda; Kuswantoro	1320	26
33	Egypt	Hala Elgibily; Ahmed Fakhry	1318	48
34	Brazil	Larissa Aparecida Ferrari Oliveira; Marcelo Roriz Jr.	1317	31
35	Kazakhstan	Bibigul Izbassarova; Pavel Fisher	1306	36
36	Lithuania	Inga Kizeliauskaite; Vilius Svedas	1306	42
37	Faroe Islands	Anja Johansen; Jogvan Niclasen	1301	n/a
38	Ireland	Deirdre Pattison; Darrel Wilson	1297	64
39	Iceland	Helga Kolbrun Magnusdottir; Gudjon Einarsson	1296	n/a
40	Bangladesh	Susmita Banik; Sumon Kumar Das	1254	56

== Elimination rounds ==
1st round
1	Colombia	148
16	Slovenia	150
9	Croatia	146
8	South Africa	148
5	South Korea	151
12	Mexico	149
13	Italy	146
4	India	136
3	United States	151
14	Spain	145
11	France	151
6	Venezuela	144
7	Netherlands	142
10	Russia	147
15	Norway	147
2	Denmark	154

Quarterfinals
16	Slovenia	141
8	South Africa	146
5	South Korea	145
13	Italy	141
3	United States	133
11	France	141
10	Russia	155
2	Denmark	152

Semifinals
8	South Africa	141
5	South Korea	144
11	France	151
10	Russia	150

Finals
5	South Korea	154
11	France	146
Third place
8	South Africa	146
10	Russia	141
