= Olena Borysenko =

Ukrainian archer

Medal record

Women's archery

Representing Ukraine

World Championships
Gold medal – first place	2015 Copenhagen	Team

Olena Borysenko (born 4 June 1996 in Kreminna, Ukraine) is a Ukrainian athlete who competes in compound archery. She started archery in 2013 and first competed for the Ukrainian national team in 2014. She is righthanded. Her draw weight is 52 lbs. As well as competing internationally in archery, she is a student. Her hobbys are singing and sociology.

She is the member of the Ukrainian women's team that won the first ever medal in compound archery and the first ever gold medal overall for Ukraine at World Archery Championships in 2015.
