= 2015 World Archery Championships =

- Location: Copenhagen, Denmark
- Start date: 26 July
- End date: 2 August
- Competitors: 623 from 96 nations

The 2015 World Archery Championships was the 48th edition of the event. It was held in Copenhagen, Denmark from 26 July to 2 August 2015 and was organised by World Archery Federation (formerly known as FITA). Qualification and elimination rounds took place at the Sundby Idrætspark, with the medal matches on 1–2 August outside the Danish Parliament building Christiansborg Palace. The competition was preceded by the World Archery Congress on 24–25 July.

The programme featured was the same as previous World Championships, with individual, team, and mixed team events in the compound and recurve disciplines. A record number of athletes has entered: 623 archers across the four disciplines. As well as participation, the Championships also broke public engagement and awareness records.

The competition was also the first opportunity for recurve athletes to secure qualification for their NOCs at the 2016 Summer Olympics. An Olympic Secondary Tournament was held to rank finishers for the purposes of Olympic qualification.

== Schedule ==
All times are local (UTC+01:00).

Date	Time	Discipline	Phase
26 July	09:00	All	Official practice
27 July	09:00	Recurve	Qualification
27 July	16:30	Compound	Qualification
28 July	09:00	All	Team eliminations / QF / SF
29 July	09:30	RM / RW	Individual eliminations
29 July	14:30	CM / CW	Individual eliminations
30 July	09:00	RW	Individual eliminations / QF / SF
30 July	12:30	CM / CW	Individual eliminations / QF / SF
30 July	16:00	RM	Individual eliminations / QF / SF
31 July	09:00	Recurve	Olympic Secondary Tournament
1 August	11:00	CMT / CWT	Medal matches
1 August	15:00	CXT / CM / CW	Medal matches
2 August	11:00	RMT / RWT	Medal matches
2 August	15:00	RXT / RM / RW	Medal matches

== Medals table ==
* Host nation (Denmark)

Rank	Nation	Gold	Silver	Bronze	Total
1	South Korea	6	0	3	9
2	Denmark*	1	0	1	2
3	Iran	1	0	0	1
3	Russia	1	0	0	1
3	Ukraine	1	0	0	1
6	Chinese Taipei	0	2	1	3
7	India	0	2	0	2
7	Netherlands	0	2	0	2
9	Canada	0	1	0	1
9	France	0	1	0	1
9	Italy	0	1	0	1
9	United States	0	1	0	1
13	China	0	0	1	1
13	Colombia	0	0	1	1
13	Great Britain	0	0	1	1
13	Japan	0	0	1	1
13	South Africa	0	0	1	1
Totals (17 entries)		10	10	10	30

== Medals summary ==
=== Recurve ===
Event	Gold	Silver	Bronze
Men's individual	Kim Woo-jin; South Korea	Rick van der Ven; Netherlands	Takaharu Furukawa; Japan
Women's individual	Ki Bo-bae; South Korea	Lin Shih-chia; Chinese Taipei	Choi Mi-sun; South Korea
Men's team	South Korea; Kim Woo-jin; Ku Bon-chan; Oh Jin-hyek	Italy; Michele Frangilli; Mauro Nespoli; David Pasqualucci	Chinese Taipei; Kuo Cheng-wei; Wang Hou-chieh; Yu Guan-lin
Women's team	Russia; Tuyana Dashidorzhieva; Ksenia Perova; Inna Stepanova	India; Rimil Buriuly; Deepika Kumari; Laxmirani Majhi	South Korea; Choi Mi-sun; Kang Chae-young; Ki Bo-bae
Mixed team	South Korea; Ki Bo-bae; Ku Bon-chan	Chinese Taipei; Lin Shih-chia; Kuo Cheng-wei	China; Zhu Jueman; Gu Xuesong

=== Compound ===
Event	Gold	Silver	Bronze
Men's individual	Stephan Hansen; Denmark	Rajat Chauhan; India	Adam Ravenscroft; Great Britain
Women's individual	Kim Yun-hee; South Korea	Crystal Gauvin; United States	Sara López; Colombia
Men's team	Iran; Esmaeil Ebadi; Majid Gheidi; Amir Kazempour	Canada; Christopher Perkins; Kevin Tataryn; Dietmar Trillus	Denmark; Martin Damsbo; Stephan Hansen; Patrick Laursen
Women's team	Ukraine; Olena Borysenko; Viktoriya Dyakova; Mariya Shkolna	Netherlands; Evelien Groeneveld; Irina Markovic; Inge Van Caspel	South Korea; Choi Bo-min; Kim Yun-hee; Seol Da-yeong
Mixed team	South Korea; Kim Yun-hee; Kim Jong-ho	France; Amelie Sancenot; Dominique Genet	South Africa; Sera Cornelius; Patrick Roux

== Participating nations ==
At the close of registrations, a record 96 nations had registered 623 athletes. Nations in bold sent the maximum number of participants, with a full team in each event. In the event, several nations and archers did not use registered places. The final number of participants was 590 from 90 countries.

- ~~Algeria (6)~~
- Argentina (5)
- Armenia (3)
- **Australia (12)**
- Austria (10)
- Azerbaijan (2)
- Bangladesh (9)
- Belarus (6)
- Belgium (9)
- Bhutan (6)
- Bolivia (2)
- **Brazil (12)**
- Bulgaria (4)
- **Canada (12)**
- ~~Chad (3)~~
- Chile (3)
- China (6)
- Chinese Taipei (6)
- **Colombia (12)**
- Croatia (4)
- Cuba (2)
- Cyprus (2)
- Czech Republic (8)
- **Denmark (12) (host)**
- Egypt (7)
- El Salvador (4)
- Estonia (6)
- Fiji (1)
- Finland (11)
- **France (12)**
- Faroe Islands (4)
- Georgia (5)
- **Germany (12)**
- Greece (7)
- Guatemala (4)
- Hungary (3)
- Iceland (11)
- **India (12)**
- Indonesia (11)
- Iran (12)
- ~~Iraq (2)~~
- Ireland (5)
- Israel (5)
- **Italy (12)**
- ~~Ivory Coast (4)~~
- Japan (8)
- Kazakhstan (10)
- North Korea (6)
- **South Korea (12)**
- Kosovo (3)
- Kyrgyzstan (1)
- Latvia (3)
- ~~Lebanon (2)~~
- Lithuania (6)
- Luxembourg (2)
- Malawi (2)
- Malaysia (6)
- Mauritius (2)
- **Mexico (12)**
- Moldova (2)
- Mongolia (6)
- Morocco (3)
- **Netherlands (12)**
- ~~Nepal (1)~~
- New Zealand (4)
- **Norway (12)**
- ~~Pakistan (6)~~
- **Philippines (12)**
- Poland (8)
- Portugal (3)
- Puerto Rico (4)
- Qatar (3)
- Romania (6)
- **Russia (12)**
- San Marino (1)
- Saudi Arabia (4)
- Serbia (2)
- Slovakia (6)
- Slovenia (8)
- South Africa (10)
- Spain (8)
- ~~Sri Lanka (4)~~
- **Sweden (12)**
- Switzerland (11)
- Tajikistan (1)
- Thailand (3)
- Tonga (2)
- **Turkey (12)**
- United Arab Emirates (3)
- Uganda (1)
- **Ukraine (12)**
- **United Kingdom (12)**
- **United States (12)**
- United States Virgin Islands (3)
- Uzbekistan (6)
- **Venezuela (12)**
- Vietnam (5)
- Zimbabwe (1)
