= Kim Yun-hee =

South Korean archer (born 1994)

Personal information
- Born: 23 March 1994 (age 32)

Sport
- Country: South Korea
- Sport: Archery
- Event: Compound
Medal record
Women's compound archery
Representing South Korea
World Championships
Gold medal – first place	2015 Copenhagen	Individual
Gold medal – first place	2015 Copenhagen	Mixed team
Bronze medal – third place	2015 Copenhagen	Team
Bronze medal – third place	2021 Yankton	Mixed team
Asian Games
Gold medal – first place	2014 Incheon	Team
Asian Championships
Gold medal – first place	2015 Bangkok	Team
Gold medal – first place	2021 Dhaka	Team
Gold medal – first place	2021 Dhaka	Mixed team
Bronze medal – third place	2021 Dhaka	Individual
Summer Universiade
Gold medal – first place	2017 Taipei	Team
Gold medal – first place	2019 Naples	Team
Bronze medal – third place	2015 Gwangju	Team

Kim Yun-hee (born 23 March 1994) is a South Korean archer competing in women's compound events.

== Career ==
She won the gold medal in the women's team compound event at the 2019 Summer Universiade, alongside So Chae-won. She also won the gold medal in this event at the 2017 Summer Universiade held in Taipei, Taiwan.

At the 2015 World Archery Championships held in Copenhagen, Denmark, she won the gold medal in the women's individual and mixed team events. She also won the bronze medal in the women's team event.
