= Clémentine de Giuli =

Swiss archer (born 1993)

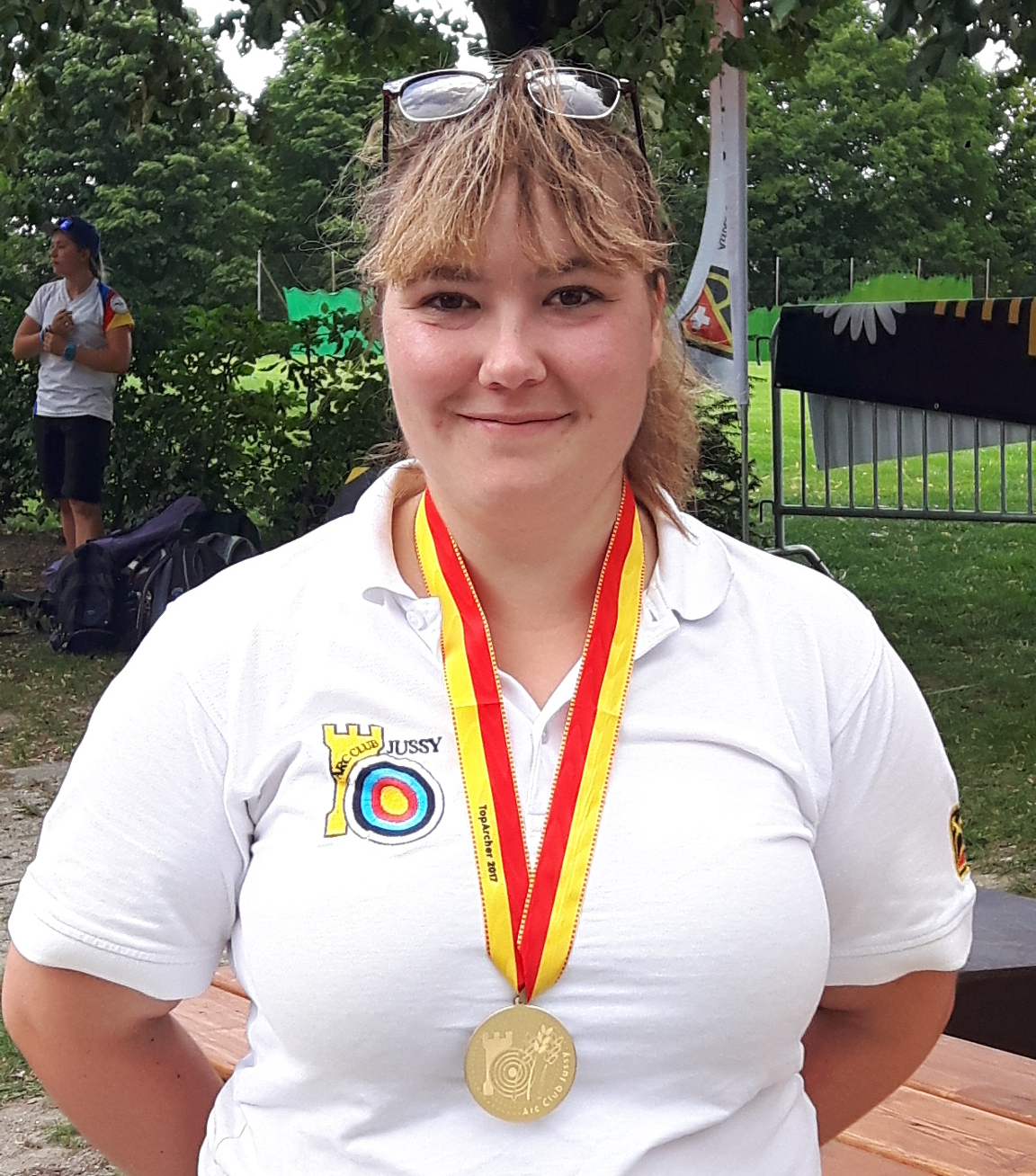
- de Giuli in 2017

Personal information
- Nationality: Swiss
- Born: 10 April 1993 (age 31); Geneva, Switzerland
- Parent(s): Marie-Thérèse de Giuli; Jean-Noël de Giuli
- Relative: Valentine de Giuli (sister)

Sport
- Country: Switzerland
- Sport: Archery

Clémentine de Giuli (born 10 April 1993) is a Swiss archer. She has been a member of the Swiss national team since 2008. De Giuli specializes in compound bow archery.

== Biography ==
De Giuli was born on 10 April 1993 in Geneva to Swiss archers Marie-Thérèse de Giuli and Jean-Noël de Giuli. She is the sister of archer Valentine de Giuli. They are both members of the Arc Club Jussy.

She began practicing archery when she was six years old. She joined the Swiss national team in 2008.

She has twenty-five Swiss championship titles. In May 2014, de Giuli was presented an award by the city and cantonal government in Geneva. She won a silver medal at the Archery World Cup in Lausanne. De Giuli has represented Switzerland at the 2015 World Archery Championships in Copenhagen and the 2017 World Archery Championships in Mexico City. She also represented Switzerland at the 2017 Archery World Cup in Berlin.
