= Crystal Gauvin =

American archer

Sport
- Country: United States
- Sport: Archery
- Events: Compound; Recurve
Medal record
Women's compound archery
Representing United States
World Championships
Silver medal – second place	2015 Copenhagen	Individual

Crystal Gauvin is an American archer. At the 2015 World Archery Championships held in Copenhagen, Denmark she won the silver medal in the women's individual event. She switched to recurve archery with the aim to qualify for the 2020 Summer Olympics.
