= Viktoriya Dyakova =

Ukrainian archer

Medal record

Women's archery

Representing Ukraine

World Championships
Gold medal – first place	2015 Copenhagen	Team

Viktoriia Diakova (born 29 September 1993 in Kyiv, Ukraine) is a Ukrainian athlete who competes in compound archery. She started archery and first competed for the Ukrainian national team in 2007. She is righthanded. Her draw weight is 55 lbs. As well as competing internationally in archery, she is a student. Her hobby is anime.

She is the member of the Ukrainian women's team that won the first ever medal in compound archery and the first ever gold medal overall for Ukraine at World Archery Championships in 2015.
