= Purvasha Shende =

Indian archer

Personal information
- Born: 26 August 1998 (age 27) Amravati Maharashtra, India

Sport
- Country: India
- Sport: Archery
- Event: Compound
Medal record
Women's Archery
Representing India
Asian Games
Bronze medal – third place	2014 Incheon	Team
Summer World University Games
Silver medal – second place	2021 Chengdu	Team

Purvasha Sudhir Shende is an Indian Archer. She won the Bronze Medal Asian Games 2014 in Incheon in the Women's team compound event along with Surekha Jyothi and Trisha Deb. She is a young budding archer the country has produced.
