= Naomi Jones =

British archer

Naomi Ruth Jones is a British archer who competes in the Senior Ladies Compound Division. She currently shoots for Edinburgh University Archery Club.

== Starting archery ==
Jones started archery while studying at The University of Edinburgh in 2008 She began competing with the Olympic style recurve bow winning the British Universities Sports Association Outdoor Championships in her novice year.

== Switch to compound ==
After one senior year as a recurve archer she began the change to Compound, shooting both styles at the University Indoor Championships in 2010.

== Achievements ==
=== FITA Indoor ===
Jones won her first national title at the 2011 British Indoor Championships She is also a multiple Scottish champion and was part of the Bronze medal winning GB team at the last World Indoor Championships in Las Vegas

In November of this year she won her first international title at the Amsterdam Face2Face tournament

=== IFAA Indoor ===
Jones also competes in the Professional Female Freestyle Unlimited category under the IFAA World governing body and is the current European Indoor Champion.

== Sponsors ==
Jones is currently sponsored by Carbon Express arrows and Carbofast stabilisers.
