= Irina Markovic =

Dutch archer (born 1976)

- Born: 23 September 1976 (age 49); Amsterdam, Netherlands
- Occupation: Archer

Medal record

Women's archery

Representing Netherlands

World Championships
Silver medal – second place	2013 Belek	Team

Irina Markovic (born 23 September 1976) is a Dutch compound archer. She is the current World Archery number 17 in women's compound archery. The highest ranking she has reached is the tenth position, which she reached for the last time in April 2011.

== Achievements ==
2005
19th, World Outdoor Championships, individual, Madrid
2006
(bronze) European Grand Prix, individual, Sassari
4th, European Outdoor Championships, individual, Athens
2007
18th, World Indoor Championships, individual, İzmir
5th, World Cup, women's team, Antalya
4th, World Outdoor Championships, individual, Leipzig
2008
(silver) European Outdoor Championships, women's team, Vittel
35th, European Outdoor Championships, individual, Vittel
2009
(bronze) World Cup, women's team, Poreč
7th, World Outdoor Championships, women's team, Ulsan
18th, World Outdoor Championships, individual, Ulsan
2010
4th, World Cup, women's team, Porec
5th, European Outdoor Championships, women's team, Rovereto
17th, European Outdoor Championships, individual, Rovereto
4th, World Cup, individual, Ogden
4th, World Cup, mixed team, Shanghai
2011
5th, World Cup, women's team, Poreč
5th, World Cup, mixed team, Antalya
9th, World Outdoor Championships, women's team, Turin
57th, World Outdoor Championships, individual, Turin
2012
5th, European Outdoor Championships, women's team, Amsterdam
8th, European Outdoor Championships, individual, Amsterdam
