= Lily Chanu Paonam =

Indian archer

Sport
- Country: India
- Sport: Archery
Medal record
Women's compound archery
Representing India
World Championships
Silver medal – second place	2017 Mexico	Team
Asian Championships
Gold medal – first place	2013 Taipei	Mixed team

Lily Chanu Paonam is an Indian Archer .She won a silver medal in the 2017 World Archery Championships.
