= Archery at the 2008 Summer Olympics – Qualification =

The athlete quota for archery is 128 athletes, 64 men and 64 women. There is a maximum of six athletes per National Olympic Committee, three per gender. NOC's with three athletes of the same gender automatically qualify for the team competition. Athletes can not qualify themselves directly into Beijing. Once they qualify they earn spots for their NOC, which then can decide which of the athletes who have reached the MQS (Minimum Qualification Score) they select. The MQS for FITA rounds are 1200 (men) and 1180 (women). For 70m rounds they are 600 (men) and 590 (women). Athletes who wish to qualify for the Olympics need to achieve the MQS in the period starting from 5 July 2007 until 16 July 2008.

== Qualification spots allocated ==
NOC	Men	Women	Total	Announced competitors	
NOC	Men	Women	Total	Men	Women
Australia	3	2	5	Sky Kim; Matthew Gray; Michael Naray	Lexie Feeney; Jane Waller
Belarus	1	1	2	Maxim Kunda	Katsiarina Muliuk
Bhutan	1	1	2	Tashi Peljor	Dorji Dema
Brazil	1		1	Luiz Trainini	
Bulgaria	1		1	Daniel Pavlov	
Canada	3	1	4	Jason Lyon; Crispin Duenas; John-David Burnes	Marie-Pier Beaudet
China	3	3	6	Xue Haifeng; Jiang Lin; Li Wenquan	Zhang Juanjuan; Chen Ling; Guo Dan
Chinese Taipei	3	3	6	Kuo Cheng Wei; Wang Cheng Pang; Chen Szu-Yuan	Yuan Shu Chi; Wu Hui Ju; Wei Pi-Hsiu
Colombia		3	3		Sigrid Romero; Ana Rendón; Natalia Sánchez
Cuba	1		1	Juan Carlos Stevens	
Cyprus		1	1		Elena Mousikou
Czech Republic	1	1	2	Martin Bulíř	Barbora Horáčková
Denmark	1	1	2	Niels Dall	Louise Laursen
Egypt	1	1	2	Maged Youssef	Soha Abed Elaal
Finland	1		1	Matti Hatava	
France	2	3	5	Romain Girouille; Jean-Charles Valladont	Virginie Arnold; Sophie Dodemont; Bérengère Schuh
Georgia		2	2		Khatuna Narimanidze; Kristina Esebua
Germany	1	1	2	Jens Pieper	Anja Hitzler
Great Britain	3	3	6	Laurence Godfrey; Simon Terry; Alan Wills	Alison Williamson; Charlotte Burgess; Naomi Folkard
Greece		2	2		Elpida Romantzi; Evangelia Psarra
India	1	3	4	Mangal Singh Champia	Laishram Bombaya Devi; Dola Banerjee; Pranitha Vardineni
Indonesia		2	2		Ika Yuliana Rochmawati; Rina Dewi Puspitasari
Iran	1	1	2	Hojjatollah Vaezi	Najmeh Abtin
Italy	3	3	6	Ilario Di Buò; Marco Galiazzo; Mauro Nespoli	Elena Tonetta; Pia Carmen Lionetti; Natalia Valeeva
Japan	2	3	5	Takaharu Furukawa; Ryuichi Moriya	Nami Hayakawa; Yuki Hayashi; Sayoko Kitabatake
Kazakhstan		1	1		Anastassiya Bannova
Malaysia	3		3	Cheng Chu Sian; Khalmizam Wan Abd Aziz; Marbawi Sulaiman	
Mauritius		1	1		Veronique D'Unienville
Mexico	2	2	4	Juan Rene Serrano; Luis Eduardo Velez Sanchez	Mariana Avitia; Aida Román
Morocco		1	1		Khadija Abbouda
Myanmar	1		1	Nay Myo Aung	
North Korea		2	2		Kwon Un Sil; Son Hye Yong
Philippines	1		1	Mark Javier	
Poland	3	3	6	Rafał Dobrowolski; Piotr Piątek; Jacek Proć	Małgorzata Ćwienczek; Iwona Marcinkiewicz; Justyna Mospinek
Portugal	1		1	Nuno Pombo	
Qatar	1		1	Ali Salem	
Romania	1		1	Alexandru Bodnar	
Russia	3	2	5	Andrey Abramov; Bair Badënov; Baljininima Tsyrempilov	Natalia Erdyniyeva; Miroslava Dagbaeva
Samoa	1		1	Muaausa Joseph Walter	
South Africa	1		1	Calvin Hartley	
South Korea	3	3	6	Im Dong-Hyun; Lee Chang-Hwan; Park Kyung-Mo	Joo Hyun-Jung; Park Sung-hyun; Yun Ok-Hee
Spain	1		1	Daniel Morillo	
Sweden	1		1	Magnus Petersson	
Switzerland		1	1		Nathalie Dielen
Tajikistan		1	1		Albina Kamaletdinova
Turkey	1	1	2	Goktug Ergin	Zekiye Keskin Satir
Ukraine	3	2	5	Markiyan Ivashko; Viktor Ruban; Oleksandr Serdyuk	Tetyana Berezhna; Viktoriya Koval
United States	3	2	5	Brady Ellison; Butch Johnson; Vic Wunderle	Jennifer Nichols; Khatuna Lorig
Venezuela		1	1		Leydis Brito
Total: 49 NOCs	64	64	128		

== Qualification timeline ==
Event	Date	Venue
2007 World Archery Championships	July 5–15, 2007	(Germany) Leipzig
Asian Championships	September 14–19, 2007	(China) Xi'an
PanAmerica Continental Qualification Tournament	October 9–13, 2007	(El Salvador) San Salvador
New Zealand Championships & Oceania Qualification	January 5–11, 2008	(New Zealand) Wellington
African Championships	February 7–10, 2008	(Egypt) Cairo
European Championships	May 12–19, 2008	(France) Vittel
Final World Qualification Tournament	June 24–28, 2008	(France) Boé
Tripartite Commission Invitations	March 19, 2008	-

== Men ==
Event	Ranking	Athletes per NOC	Qualified
Host Nation	-	3	China
2007 World Championships, team event	Top 8	3	South Korea; Great Britain; Chinese Taipei; Poland; Italy; United States; Ukraine; Canada
2007 World Championships, individual event	Top 16	Up to 2	(Russia) Baljininima Tsyrempilov (Malaysia) Cheng Chu Sian (Japan) Takaharu Furukawa (Sweden) Magnus Petersson (Mexico) Luis Eduardo Velez Sanchez (Denmark) Niels Dall (Australia) David Barnes (Iran) Hojjatollah Vaezi (Australia) Sky Kim (Russia) Bair Badënov (Bulgaria) Daniel Pavlov (Germany) Jens Pieper (Malaysia) Marbawi Sulaiman (Turkey) Goktug Ergin (Romania) Alexandru Bodnar (Japan) Ryuichi Moriya
Asian Championships	Top 3	Up to 2	(Philippines) Mark Javier (India) Mangal Singh Champia (Malaysia) Khalmizam Wan Abd Aziz
European Championship	Top 3	Up to 2	(France) Romain Girouille (Russia) Andrey Abramov (France) Jean-Charles Valladont
Pan American Continental Qualification Tournament	Top 3	Up to 2	(Mexico) Juan Rene Serrano (Cuba) Juan Carlos Stevens (Brazil) Luiz Trainini
African Championships	Top 2	Up to 2	(South Africa) Calvin Hartley (Egypt) Amr Ghanem
New Zealand Championships & Oceania Qualification	Top 2	Up to 2	(Australia) Michael Naray (Samoa) Muaausa Joseph Walter
Final World Qualification Tournament	Top 5	1	(Portugal) Nuno Pombo (Finland) Matti Hatava (Belarus) Maxim Kunda (Czech Republic) Milan Andreas (Spain) Daniel Morillo
Tripartite Commission Invitations	3	1	(Bhutan) Tashi Peljor; ~~(Iraq) Ali Adnan~~ (Myanmar) Nay Myo Aung (Qatar) Ali Salem

== Women ==
Event	Ranking	Athletes per NOC	Qualified
Host Nation	-	3	China
2007 World Championships, team event	Top 8	3	South Korea; Chinese Taipei; Great Britain; Italy; Poland; India; France; Colombia
2007 World Championships, individual event	Top 16	Up to 2	(Russia) Natalia Erdyniyeva (United States) Jennifer Nichols (Georgia (country)) Khatuna Narimanidze (North Korea) Kwon Un Sil (Ukraine) Tetyana Berezhna (Ukraine) Viktoriya Koval (Japan) Nami Hayakawa (Russia) Tatyana Boroday (Japan) Sayoko Kitabatake (North Korea) Ri Koch Sun (Kazakhstan) Anastassiya Bannova (Georgia (country)) Kristina Esebua (Denmark) Louise Laursen (Greece) Elpida Romantzi (Venezuela) Lisbeth Leoni (Canada) Marie-Pier Beaudet
Asian Championships	Top 3	Up to 2	(Indonesia) Ika Yuliana Rochmawati (Japan) Yuki Hayashi (Indonesia) Rina Dewi Puspitasari
European Championship	Top 3	Up to 2	(Turkey) Zekiye Keskin Satir (Greece) Evangelia Psarra (Belarus) Zhanna Svistun
PanAmerica Continental Qualification Tournament	Top 3	Up to 2	(Mexico) Janeth Garcia (United States) Karen Scavotto (Mexico) Aida Roman
African Championships	Top 2	Up to 2	(Morocco) Fatine Ouadoudi (Egypt) Amira Mansour
New Zealand Championships & Oceania Qualification	Top 2	Up to 2	(Australia) Jane Waller (Australia) Jade Lindsay
Final World Qualification Tournament	Top 5	1	(Germany) Anja Hitzler (Iran) Najmeh Abtin (Switzerland) Nathalie Dielen (Cyprus) Elena Mousikou (Czech Republic) Barbora Horackova
Tripartite Commission Invitations	3	1	(Bhutan) Dorji Dema (Mauritius) Veronique D'Unienville (Tajikistan) Albina Kamaletdinova

== Team Event Qualification ==
National Olympic Committee	Men's	Women's
China	H	H
Great Britain	W	W
Italy	W	W
South Korea	W	W
Poland	W	W
Chinese Taipei	W	W
Japan		C
Ukraine	W	
India		W
United States	W	
Canada	W	
Colombia		W
France		W
Malaysia	C	
Australia	C	
Russia	C	
Total	12	10

- H: qualified as host nation
- W: qualified after the world championships
- C: qualified after the continental championships

== See also ==
- Archery at the Summer Olympics § Qualification
