= Archery at the 2008 Summer Olympics – Men's individual =

Men's individual at the Games of the XXIX Olympiad
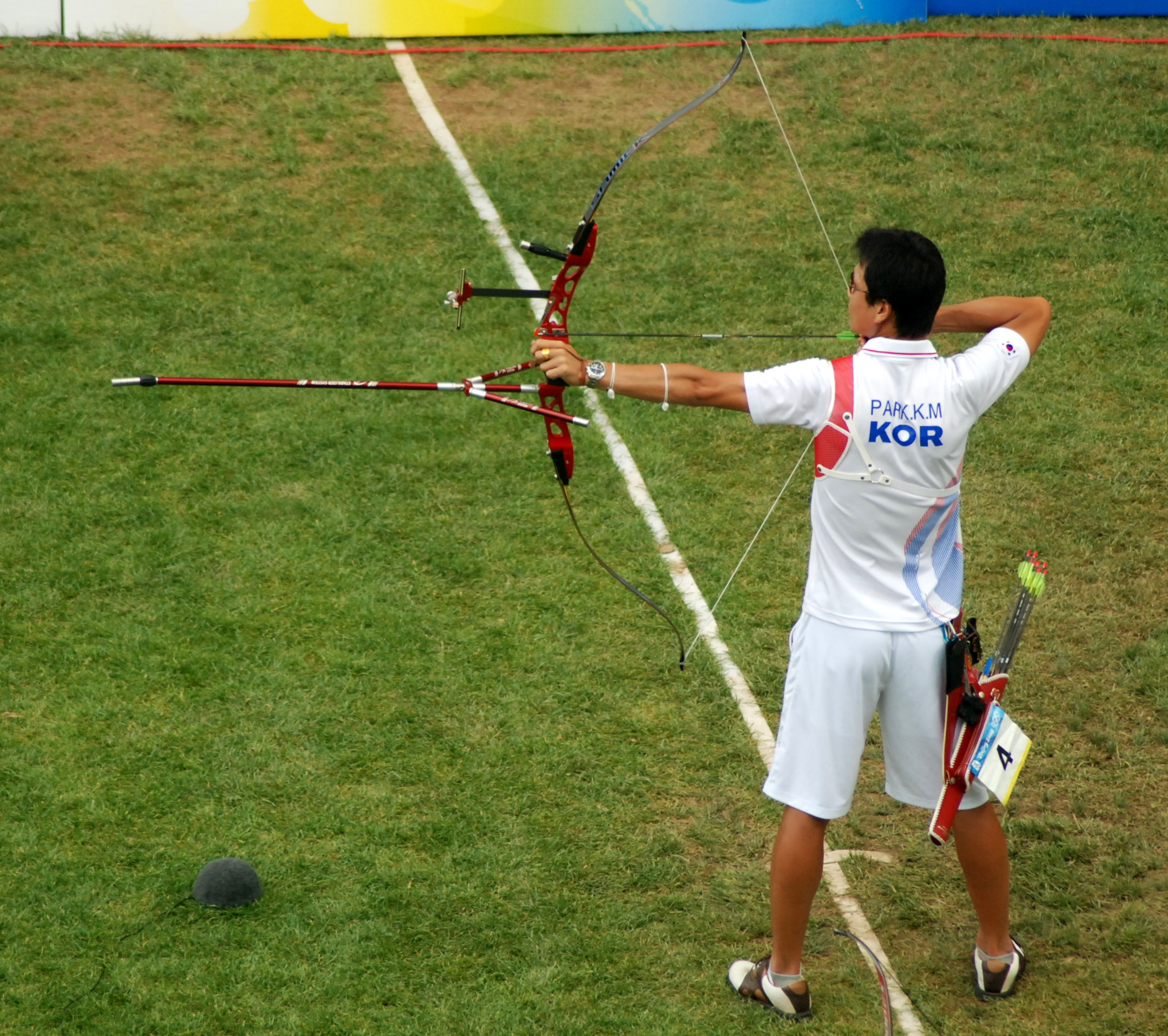
- Silver medallist Park Kyung-Mo, during a round of 32 match against Kuo Cheng Wei
- Venue: Olympic Green Archery Field
- Dates: 9–15 August 2008
- Competitors: 64 from 37 nations
- Winning score: 113

Medalists
1st place, gold medalist(s)		Viktor Ruban	Ukraine
2nd place, silver medalist(s)		Park Kyung-Mo	South Korea
3rd place, bronze medalist(s)		Bair Badënov	Russia

The men's individual archery event at the 2008 Summer Olympics was part of the archery programme and took place at the Olympic Green Archery Field. Ranking Round was scheduled for 9 August. First and second elimination rounds took place on 13 August, and eights, quarterfinal, semifinals and medals matches were staged on 15 August. All archery was done at a range of 70 metres, with targets 1.22 metres in diameter.

Marco Galiazzo was at Beijing to defend his Olympic Gold Medal won on Athens but failed to qualify for the finals after being defeated in the Round of 32. Japanese Hiroshi Yamamoto, silver at the last Games, and Australian Tim Cuddihy did not participate at the Chinese Games.

64 archers from 37 countries qualified for the event at the Beijing Olympics. The 44th Outdoor Archery World championship, held in Leipzig, Germany, plus 5 continental qualification tournaments and a Final World Qualification Tournament selected 61 slots for the event, along with 3 Tripartite Commission Invitations.

The competition began with the ranking round. Each archer fired 72 arrows. This round was done entirely to seed the elimination brackets; all archers moved on to them. The elimination rounds used a single-elimination tournament, with fixed brackets based on the ranking round seeding. In each round of elimination, the two archers in each match fired 12 arrows; the archer with the higher score advanced to the next round while the other archer was eliminated. Unlike in previous years, in which the first three rounds used an 18-arrow match, the 12-arrow match was used throughout the 2008 tournament.

== Schedule ==
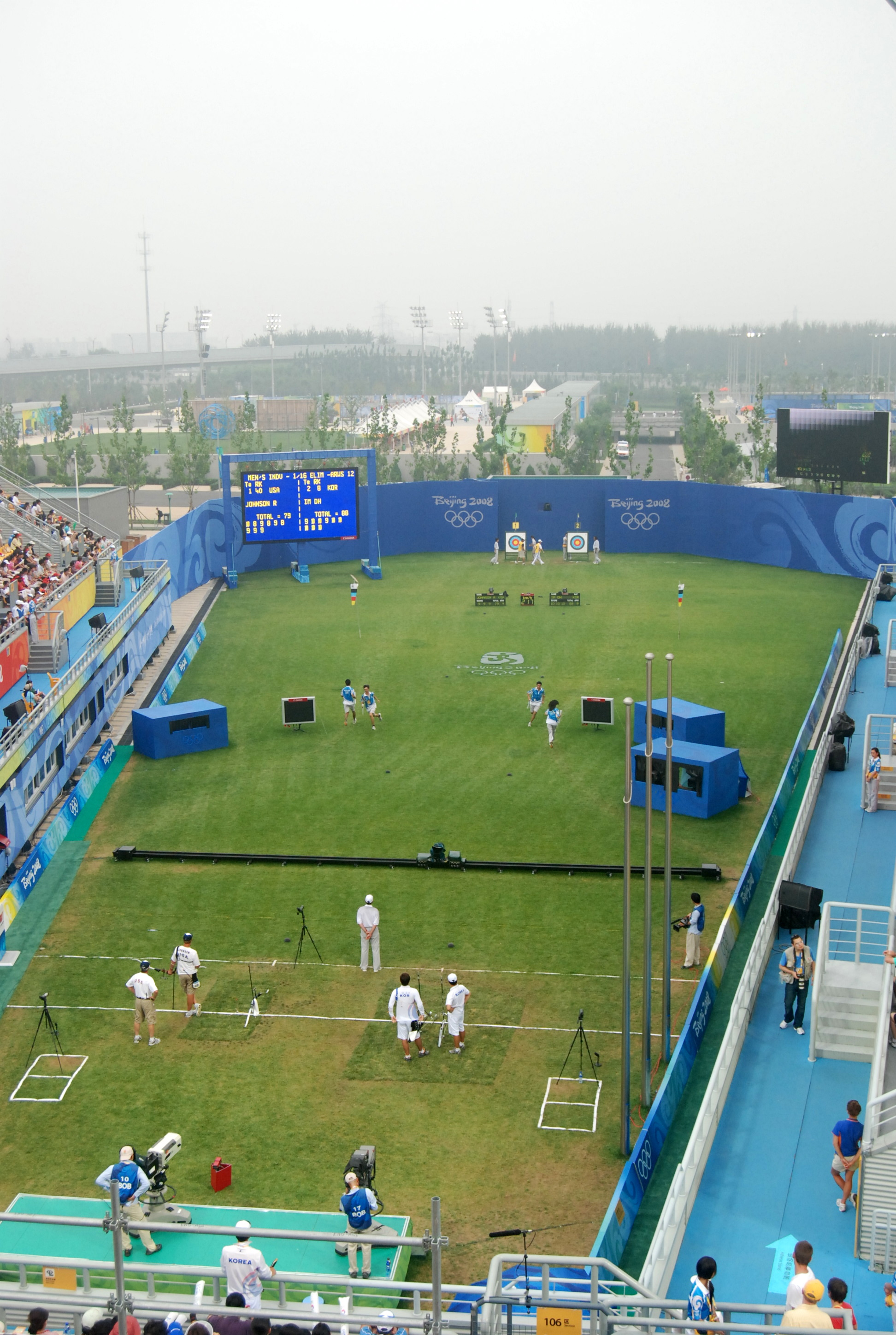
Men's individual

All times are China Standard Time (UTC+8)

Date	Time	Round
Saturday, 9 August 2008	15:30-17:30	Ranking Round
Wednesday, 13 August 2008	10:00-12:35; 15:30-18:05	Round of 64, Round of 32
Friday, 15 August 2008	10:30-12:15	Round of 16
Friday, 15 August 2008	16:00-16:52	Quarterfinals
Friday, 15 August 2008	16:52-17:20	Semifinals
Friday, 15 August 2008	17:21-17:50	Finals

== Records ==
Prior to this competition, the existing world and Olympic records were as follows.

- 72 arrow ranking round

World record	Im Dong-Hyun (KOR)	687	Athens, Greece	12 August 2004
Olympic record	Michele Frangilli (ITA)	684	Atlanta, United States	28 July 1996

- 12 arrow match

World record	Choi Won-jong (KOR)	120	Ulsan, South Korea	18 October 2005
Olympic record	Lee Chang-hwan (KOR)	115	Beijing, China	13 August 2008

The following new world and Olympic records were set during this competition.

Date	Record	Round	Name	Nationality	Score	OR	WR
13 August	12 arrow match	Round of 64	Jacek Proc	Poland	116	OR	
13 August	12 arrow match	Round of 32	Lee Chang-hwan	South Korea	117	OR	

== Results ==
=== Ranking Round ===
Rank	Archer	Nation	Score
1	Juan René Serrano	Mexico	679
2	Mangal Singh Champia	India	678
3	Viktor Ruban	Ukraine	678
4	Park Kyung-Mo	South Korea	676
5	Wan Kalmizam	Malaysia	674
6	Balzhinima Tsyrempilov	Russia	671
7	Simon Terry	Great Britain	670
8	Im Dong-Hyun	South Korea	670
9	Ilario Di Buò	Italy	670
10	Lee Chang-Hwan	South Korea	669
11	Wang Cheng Pang	Chinese Taipei	667
12	Marco Galiazzo	Italy	667
13	Rafał Dobrowolski	Poland	667
14	Sky Kim	Australia	665
15	Brady Ellison	United States	664
16	Crispin Duenas	Canada	664
17	Takaharu Furukawa	Japan	663
18	Xue Haifeng	China	663
19	Jacek Proć	Poland	661
20	Oleksandr Serdyuk	Ukraine	661
21	Alan Wills	Great Britain	661
22	Ryuichi Moriya	Japan	661
23	Yusuf Ergin	Turkey	660
24	Eduardo Vélez	Mexico	660
25	Andrey Abramov	Russia	660
26	Cheng Chu Sian	Malaysia	660
27	Muhammad Marbawi	Malaysia	659
28	Juan Carlos Stevens	Cuba	659
29	Kuo Cheng Wei	Chinese Taipei	659
30	Michael Naray	Australia	658
31	Bair Badënov	Russia	658
32	Markiyan Ivashko	Ukraine	658
33	Daniel Morillo	Spain	657
34	Laurence Godfrey	Great Britain	657
35	Jean-Charles Valladont	France	656
36	Mark Javier	Philippines	654
37	Calvin Hartley	South Africa	654
38	Chen Szu Yuan	Chinese Taipei	654
39	Matthew Gray	Australia	654
40	Richard Johnson	United States	653
41	Vic Wunderle	United States	652
42	Nuno Pombo	Portugal	650
43	Piotr Piątek	Poland	649
44	Mauro Nespoli	Italy	649
45	Jens Pieper	Germany	648
46	Li Wenquan	China	646
47	Jason Lyon	Canada	646
48	Maksim Kunda	Belarus	646
49	Magnus Petersson	Sweden	646
50	John David Burnes	Canada	644
51	Romain Girouille	France	641
52	Nay Myo Aung	Myanmar	637
53	Niels Dall	Denmark	634
54	Tashi Peljor	Bhutan	632
55	Jiang Lin	China	632
56	Martin Bulíř	Czech Republic	629
57	Ali Al-Yazidi	Qatar	627
58	Matti Hatava	Finland	619
59	Daniel Pavlov	Bulgaria	618
60	Alexandru Bodnar	Romania	614
61	Luiz Trainini	Brazil	610
62	Maged Youssef	Egypt	605
63	Hojjatollah Vaezi	Iran	604
64	Joseph Muaausa	Samoa	563

=== Competition bracket ===
==== Section 1 ====
Round of 64
1	Juan René Serrano (MEX)	116
64	Joseph Muaausa (SAM)	88
32	Markivan Ivashko (UKR)	107
33	Daniel Morillo (ESP)	115
16	Crispin Duenas (CAN)	108^{9,9}
49	Magnus Petersson (SWE)	108^{9,10}
17	Furukawa Takaharu (JPN)	111^{9,9}
48	Maksim Kunda (BLR)	111^{9,10}
8	Im Dong-Hyun (KOR)	108
57	Ali Al-Yazidi (QAT)	103
25	Andrey Abramov (RUS)	109^{8,9,8}
40	Butch Johnson (USA)	109^{8,9,9}
9	Ilario Di Buò (ITA)	111
56	Martin Bulíř (CZE)	100
24	Eduardo Vélez (MEX)	102
41	Vic Wunderle (USA)	106

Round of 32
1	Juan René Serrano (MEX)	112
33	Daniel Morillo (ESP)	111
49	Magnus Petersson (SWE)	110
48	Maksim Kunda (BLR)	112
8	Im Dong-Hyun (KOR)	115
40	Butch Johnson (USA)	106
9	Ilario Di Buò (ITA)	108^{9,8}
41	Vic Wunderle (USA)	108^{9,10}

Round of 16
1	Juan René Serrano (MEX)	110
48	Maksim Kunda (BLR)	106
8	Im Dong-Hyun (KOR)	111
41	Vic Wunderle (USA)	113

Quarterfinals
1	Juan René Serrano (MEX)	113
41	Vic Wunderle (USA)	106

==== Section 2 ====
Round of 64
4	Park Kyung-Mo (KOR)	116
61	Luiz Trainini (BRA)	99
29	Kuo Cheng Wei (TPE)	106
36	Mark Javier (PHI)	102
13	Rafał Dobrowolski (POL)	110
52	Nay Myo Aung (MYA)	106
20	Oleksandr Serdyuk (UKR)	107
45	Jens Pieper (GER)	105
5	Wan Kalmizam (MAS)	105
60	Alexandru Bodnar (ROU)	106
28	Juan Carlos Stevens (CUB)	107^{9,10}
37	Calvin Hartley (RSA)	107^{9,9}
12	Marco Galiazzo (ITA)	114
53	Niels Dall (DEN)	97
21	Alan Wills (GBR)	103
44	Mauro Nespoli (ITA)	99

Round of 32
4	Park Kyung-Mo (KOR)	111
29	Kuo Cheng Wei (TPE)	110
13	Rafał Dobrowolski (POL)	111^{9}
20	Oleksandr Serdyuk (UKR)	111^{8}
60	Alexandru Bodnar (ROU)	101
28	Juan Carlos Stevens (CUB)	108
12	Marco Galiazzo (ITA)	109
21	Alan Wills (GBR)	110

Round of 16
4	Park Kyung-Mo (KOR)	113
13	Rafał Dobrowolski (POL)	105
28	Juan Carlos Stevens (CUB)	108
21	Alan Wills (GBR)	104

Quarterfinals
4	Park Kyung-Mo (KOR)	108^{9,10}
28	Juan Carlos Stevens (CUB)	108^{9,8}

==== Section 3 ====
Round of 64
3	Viktor Ruban (UKR)	111
62	Maged Youssef (EGY)	96
30	Michael Naray (AUS)	108
35	Jean-Charles Valladont (FRA)	106
19	Jacek Proć (POL)	116(OR)
46	Li Wenquan (CHN)	111
14	Sky Kim (AUS)	112
51	Romain Girouille (FRA)	110
6	Balzhinima Tsyrempilov (RUS)	112
59	Daniel Pavlov (BUL)	102
27	Muhammad Marbawi (MAS)	106
38	Chen Szu Yuan (TPE)	107
22	Moriya Ryuichi (JPN)	109^{10}
43	Piotr Piątek (POL)	109^{9}
11	Wang Cheng Pang (TPE)	110
54	Tashi Peljor (BHU)	100

Round of 32
3	Viktor Ruban (UKR)	115
30	Michael Naray (AUS)	105
19	Jacek Proć (POL)	111
14	Sky Kim (AUS)	110
6	Balzhinima Tsyrempilov (RUS)	109
38	Chen Szu Yuan (TPE)	101
22	Moriya Ryuichi (JPN)	114
11	Wang Cheng Pang (TPE)	109

Round of 16
3	Viktor Ruban (UKR)	114
19	Jacek Proć (POL)	108
6	Balzhinima Tsyrempilov (RUS)	110
22	Moriya Ryuichi (JPN)	113

Quarterfinals
3	Viktor Ruban (UKR)	115
22	Moriya Ryuichi (JPN)	106

==== Section 4 ====
Round of 64
7	Simon Terry (GBR)	104
58	Matti Hatava (FIN)	105
26	Cheng Chu Sian (MAS)	109
39	Matthew Gray (AUS)	101
23	Yusuf Ergin (TUR)	106
42	Nuno Pombo (POR)	103
10	Lee Chang-Hwan (KOR)	112
55	Jiang Lin (CHN)	108
15	Brady Ellison (USA)	111
50	John Burnes (CAN)	89
18	Xue Haifeng (CHN)	106
47	Jason Lyon (CAN)	111
31	Bair Badënov (RUS)	114
34	Laurence Godfrey (GBR)	109
2	Mangal Singh Champia (IND)	112
63	Hojjatollah Vaezi (IRI)	98

Round of 32
58	Matti Hatava (FIN)	103
26	Cheng Chu Sian (MAS)	110
23	Yusuf Ergin (TUR)	109
10	Lee Chang-Hwan (KOR)	117(OR)
15	Brady Ellison (USA)	107
47	Jason Lyon (CAN)	113
31	Bair Badënov (RUS)	109
2	Mangal Singh Champia (IND)	108

Round of 16
26	Cheng Chu Sian (MAS)	105^{9,10}
10	Lee Chang-Hwan (KOR)	105^{9,9}
47	Jason Lyon (CAN)	110
31	Bair Badënov (RUS)	115

Quarterfinals
26	Cheng Chu Sian (MAS)	104
31	Bair Badënov (RUS)	109

==== Finals ====
Semi-finals
Juan René Serrano (MEX)	112
Park Kyung-Mo (KOR)	115
Viktor Ruban (UKR)	112^{10,10}
Bair Badënov (RUS)	112^{10,8}

Gold medal match
Park Kyung-Mo (KOR)	112
Viktor Ruban (UKR)	113
Bronze medal match
Juan René Serrano (MEX)	110
Bair Badënov (RUS)	115

Rank	Athlete	1	2	3	4	5	6	7	8	9	10	11	12	Total	Note
1st place, gold medalist(s)	Viktor Ruban (UKR)	9	10	10	9	9	9	10	10	9	9	9	10	113	Gold Medal Match
2nd place, silver medalist(s)	Park Kyung-Mo (KOR)	9	9	10	10	10	10	10	9	9	9	8	9	112	Gold Medal Match
3rd place, bronze medalist(s)	Bair Badënov (RUS)	10	9	9	10	9	9	9	10	10	10	10	10	115	Bronze Medal Match
4	Juan René Serrano (MEX)	9	10	10	10	9	7	10	9	8	9	9	10	110	Bronze Medal Match
