= 2009 World Archery Championships – Men's individual recurve =

The men's individual recurve competition at the 2009 World Archery Championships took place on 4–9 September 2009 in Ulsan, South Korea. 116 archers entered the competition, with one withdrawal before the qualification round on 4 September. As there were fewer than 128 entrants, all archers qualified for the 7-round knockout round on 6 September which was drawn according to their qualification round scores. The semi-finals and finals then took place on 9 September.

The final was an all-Korean affair, with second seed Lee Chang-hwan defeating Im Dong-hyun by five points. It marked the last World Archery Championships in which 12 arrow shoot-offs were used for the individual recurve competition elimination rounds; from 2011 the Olympic Round scoring system was adopted.

In the qualification round, first seed Oh Jin-hyek set a new world record of 1386. Oh Kyo-moon's record score of 1379 had stood since 2000.

== Seeds ==
The top 13 qualifiers received byes to the second round.

1. (South Korea) Oh Jin-hyek (4th place)
2. (South Korea) Lee Chang-hwan (Champion)
3. (France) Romain Girouille (Quarterfinal)
4. (South Korea) Im Dong-hyun (2nd place)
5. (Chinese Taipei) Kuo Cheng-wei (3rd round)
6. (France) Jean-Charles Valladont (2nd round)
7. (India) Mangal Singh Champia (Quarterfinal)
8. (United States) Brady Ellison (3rd round)
9. (United Kingdom) Simon Terry (3rd round)
10. (Chinese Taipei) Wang Cheng-pang (2nd round)
11. (Ukraine) Viktor Ruban (3rd place)
12. (Russia) Bair Badenov (3rd round)
13. (India) Jayanta Talukdar (2nd round)

== Draw ==
=== Top Half ===
==== Section 1 ====
1st round
1	(South Korea) Oh Jin-hyek
Bye
65	(Luxembourg) Jeff Henckels	109
64	(Germany) Jens Pieper	101
33	(Italy) Mauro Nespoli	110
96	(Kazakhstan) Artyom Gankin	108
97	(Romania) Daniel Ciornei	105
32	(India) Rahul Banerjee	110
17	(Canada) Crispin Duenas	102
112	(Hong Kong) Chan Chun Shing	97
81	(New Zealand) Stephen Florence	97
48	(United States) Richard Johnson	107
49	(Poland) Piotr Piątek	102
80	(Romania) Alexandru Bodnar	105
113	(Philippines) Marvin Agustin	93
16	(Australia) Matthew Gray	110

2nd round
1	(South Korea) Oh Jin-hyek	112
65	(Luxembourg) Jeff Henckels	101
33	(Italy) Mauro Nespoli	107
32	(India) Rahul Banerjee	114
17	(Canada) Crispin Duenas	107
48	(United States) Richard Johnson	103
80	(Romania) Alexandru Bodnar	101
16	(Australia) Matthew Gray	102

3rd round
1	(South Korea) Oh Jin-hyek	112
32	(India) Rahul Banerjee	109
17	(Canada) Crispin Duenas	113
16	(Australia) Matthew Gray	102

4th round
1	(South Korea) Oh Jin-hyek	114
17	(Canada) Crispin Duenas	110

==== Section 2 ====
1st round
9	(United Kingdom) Simon Terry
Bye
73	(South Africa) Calvin Hartley	109
56	(Portugal) Nuno Pombo	108
41	(United Kingdom) Alan Wills	105
88	(Canada) John David Burnes	98
105	(Portugal) Marco Rosa	100
24	(Iran) Keyvan Riyazimehr	108
25	(China) Chen Wenyuan	108
104	(Uzbekistan) Radiy Gaynulin	91
89	(Portugal) Domingos Vaquinhas	102
40	(France) Thomas Aubert	107
57	(Turkey) Serdar Şatır	103
72	(Iran) Milad Vaziri	108
8	(United States) Brady Ellison
Bye

2nd round
9	(United Kingdom) Simon Terry	108
73	(South Africa) Calvin Hartley	104
41	(United Kingdom) Alan Wills	104^{9;9}
24	(Iran) Keyvan Riyazimehr	104^{9;7}
25	(China) Chen Wenyuan	106
40	(France) Thomas Aubert	104
72	(Iran) Milad Vaziri	103
8	(United States) Brady Ellison	108

3rd round
9	(United Kingdom) Simon Terry	106
41	(United Kingdom) Alan Wills	109
25	(China) Chen Wenyuan	111
8	(United States) Brady Ellison	109

4th round
41	(United Kingdom) Alan Wills	97
25	(China) Chen Wenyuan	103

==== Section 3 ====
1st round
5	(Chinese Taipei) Kuo Cheng-wei
Bye
69	(Belarus) Mikalai Marusau	107
60	(Finland) Matti Hatava	109
37	(Mexico) David Marin Coello	110
92	(Singapore) Leow Ting Yue	101
101	(Greece) Alexandros Karageorgiou	98
28	(Ukraine) Dmytro Hrachov	112
21	(Canada) Jason Lyon	108
108	(Bhutan) Jigme Dukpa	96
85	(Kazakhstan) Konstantin Solodovnikov	102
44	(Chinese Taipei) Sung Chia-chun	104
53	(Indonesia) Rahmat Sulistiawan	101
76	(Finland) Antti Mansukoski	108
12	(Russia) Bair Badenov
Bye

2nd round
5	(Chinese Taipei) Kuo Cheng-wei	111
60	(Finland) Matti Hatava	106
37	(Mexico) David Marin Coello	110
28	(Ukraine) Dmytro Hrachov	111
21	(Canada) Jason Lyon	109^{10}
44	(Chinese Taipei) Sung Chia-chun	109^{9}
76	(Finland) Antti Mansukoski	102
12	(Russia) Bair Badenov	111

3rd round
5	(Chinese Taipei) Kuo Cheng-wei	114^{10;8}
28	(Ukraine) Dmytro Hrachov	114^{10;9}
21	(Canada) Jason Lyon	109
12	(Russia) Bair Badenov	106

4th round
28	(Ukraine) Dmytro Hrachov	116
21	(Canada) Jason Lyon	108

==== Section 4 ====
1st round
13	(India) Jayanta Talukdar
Bye
77	(Bulgaria) Yavor Hristov	108
52	(Italy) Ilario di Buo	107
45	(Spain) Daniel Morillo	107
84	(Brazil) Klaus von Behr	97
109	(Philippines) Elijah Sudama Bismark	97
20	(Japan) Hideki Kikuchi	112
29	(Malaysia) Mohd Zulkifli Tahil	106
100	(Slovakia) Martin Hornak	104
93	(Colombia) Robinson Álvarez	102
36	(Australia) Sky Kim	111
61	(Australia) Michael Naray	106
68	(Norway) Vetle Risinggard	104
4	(South Korea) Im Dong-hyun
Bye

2nd round
13	(India) Jayanta Talukdar	108
77	(Bulgaria) Yavor Hristov	111
45	(Spain) Daniel Morillo	106
20	(Japan) Hideki Kikuchi	111
29	(Malaysia) Mohd Zulkifli Tahil	103
36	(Australia) Sky Kim	111
61	(Australia) Michael Naray	108
4	(South Korea) Im Dong-hyun	116

3rd round
77	(Bulgaria) Yavor Hristov	102
20	(Japan) Hideki Kikuchi	110
36	(Australia) Sky Kim	100
4	(South Korea) Im Dong-hyun	112

4th round
20	(Japan) Hideki Kikuchi	110
4	(South Korea) Im Dong-hyun	112

=== Bottom Half ===
==== Section 5 ====
1st round
3	(France) Romain Girouille
Bye
67	(Iran) Manoochehri Moghadam Nader	106
62	(Finland) Antti Tekoniemi	97
35	(Japan) Hiroshi Yamamoto	111
94	(Indonesia) Hendro Suprianto	98
99	(Uzbekistan) Amet Umerov	107
30	(Italy) Marco Galiazzo	113
19	(Russia) Baljinima Tsyrempilov	109
110	(Singapore) Chee Bin Benson Ong	100
83	(Malaysia) Wan Khalmizam	100
46	(United Kingdom) Laurence Godfrey	113
51	(Kazakhstan) Oibek Saidiyev	104
78	(Turkey) Mustafa Sahin Karacam	101
115	(Hong Kong) Choi Chong Patrick Ma	79
14	(Malaysia) Cheng Chu Sian	110

2nd round
3	(France) Romain Girouille	112
67	(Iran) Manoochehri Moghadam Nader	106
35	(Japan) Hiroshi Yamamoto	109
30	(Italy) Marco Galiazzo	110
19	(Russia) Baljinima Tsyrempilov	108^{9;7}
46	(United Kingdom) Laurence Godfrey	108^{9;9}
51	(Kazakhstan) Oibek Saidiyev	111^{9;9;10}
14	(Malaysia) Cheng Chu Sian	111^{9;9;8}

3rd round
3	(France) Romain Girouille	110
30	(Italy) Marco Galiazzo	107
46	(United Kingdom) Laurence Godfrey	104
51	(Kazakhstan) Oibek Saidiyev	108

4th round
3	(France) Romain Girouille	112
51	(Kazakhstan) Oibek Saidiyev	109

==== Section 6 ====
1st round
11	(Ukraine) Viktor Ruban
Bye
75	(Belgium) Ivan Denis	105
54	(Poland) Damian Goly	106
43	(United States) Victor Wunderle	100
86	(Turkey) Göktuğ Ergin	104
107	(Norway) Robert Landskaug	98
22	(China) Xue Haifeng	110
27	(Spain) Elias Cuesta	107
102	(Bhutan) Ngawang Tashi	96
91	(Bulgaria) Vencislav Velikov	103
38	(Norway) Bård Nesteng	109
59	(Japan) Hiroyuki Yoshinaga	109
70	(Russia) Alexey Borodin	104
6	(France) Jean-Charles Valladont
Bye

2nd round
11	(Ukraine) Viktor Ruban	109
54	(Poland) Damian Goly	108
86	(Turkey) Göktuğ Ergin	108^{7}
22	(China) Xue Haifeng	108^{9}
27	(Spain) Elias Cuesta	113
38	(Norway) Bård Nesteng	110
59	(Japan) Hiroyuki Yoshinaga	108^{10}
6	(France) Jean-Charles Valladont	108^{9}

3rd round
11	(Ukraine) Viktor Ruban	112
22	(China) Xue Haifeng	109
27	(Spain) Elias Cuesta	109^{9;10;9}
59	(Japan) Hiroyuki Yoshinaga	109^{9;10;8}

4th round
11	(Ukraine) Viktor Ruban	111
27	(Spain) Elias Cuesta	106

==== Section 7 ====
1st round
7	(India) Mangal Singh Champia
Bye
71	(Greece) Stefanos Tserkezis	108
58	(Spain) Andrés Gómez	104
39	(Germany) Sebastian Rohrberg	109
90	(Brazil) Fabio Emilio	103
103	(Bhutan) Chencho Dorji	101
26	(Ukraine) Markiyan Ivashko	113
23	(China) Xing Yu	113
106	(Brazil) Daniel Rezende Xavier	105
87	(Czech Republic) Filip Pertlik	106
42	(Poland) Rafał Dobrowolski	110
55	(Belarus) Maxim Kunda	104
74	(Republic of Ireland) Keith Hanlon	99
10	(Chinese Taipei) Wang Cheng-pang
Bye

2nd round
7	(India) Mangal Singh Champia	113
71	(Greece) Stefanos Tserkezis	108
39	(Germany) Sebastian Rohrberg	98
26	(Ukraine) Markiyan Ivashko	111
23	(China) Xing Yu	116
42	(Poland) Rafał Dobrowolski	109
55	(Belarus) Maxim Kunda	110
10	(Chinese Taipei) Wang Cheng-pang	107

3rd round
7	(India) Mangal Singh Champia	114
26	(Ukraine) Markiyan Ivashko	112
23	(China) Xing Yu	108
55	(Belarus) Maxim Kunda	104

4th round
7	(India) Mangal Singh Champia	111
23	(China) Xing Yu	109

==== Section 8 ====
1st round
15	(Mexico) Juan René Serrano	112
114	(Hong Kong) Chan Kwai Keung	90
79	(Denmark) Martin Laursen	98
50	(Bulgaria) Hristo Hristov	111
47	(Romania) Razvan Marcu	103
82	(Hungary) Pal Csoregh	104
111	(San Marino) Emanuele Guidi	103
18	(Belarus) Anton Prilepau	102
31	(Mexico) Eduardo Vélez	110
98	(Indonesia) Mohammad Ali Ali Sofian	102
95	(Luxembourg) Gilles Decker	109^{8}
34	(Germany) Florian Floto	109^{10}
63	(Belgium) Nico Thiry	110
66	(Singapore) Tan Silie	103
2	(South Korea) Lee Chang-hwan
Bye

2nd round
15	(Mexico) Juan René Serrano	109
50	(Bulgaria) Hristo Hristov	101
82	(Hungary) Pal Csoregh	100
111	(San Marino) Emanuele Guidi	94
31	(Mexico) Eduardo Vélez	104
34	(Germany) Florian Floto	109
63	(Belgium) Nico Thiry	100
2	(South Korea) Lee Chang-hwan	110

3rd round
15	(Mexico) Juan René Serrano	116
82	(Hungary) Pal Csoregh	98
34	(Germany) Florian Floto	109
2	(South Korea) Lee Chang-hwan	113

4th round
15	(Mexico) Juan René Serrano	114
2	(South Korea) Lee Chang-hwan	118

== Finals ==
Quarterfinals
1	(South Korea) Oh Jin-hyek	109
25	(China) Chen Wenyuan	100
28	(Ukraine) Dmytro Hrachov	109
4	(South Korea) Im Dong-hyun	112
3	(France) Romain Girouille	111
11	(Ukraine) Viktor Ruban	114
7	(India) Mangal Singh Champia	111
2	(South Korea) Lee Chang-hwan	114

Semifinals
1	(South Korea) Oh Jin-hyek	110
4	(South Korea) Im Dong-hyun	112
11	(Ukraine) Viktor Ruban	109
2	(South Korea) Lee Chang-hwan	112

Finals
4	(South Korea) Im Dong-hyun	108
2	(South Korea) Lee Chang-hwan	113
Third place
1	(South Korea) Oh Jin-hyek	110
11	(Ukraine) Viktor Ruban	111
