= 2011 World Archery Championships – Men's individual recurve =

The men's individual recurve competition at the 2011 World Archery Championships took place on 5–10 July 2011 in Torino, Italy. It marked the first World Championships where the Archery Olympic Round, introduced in 2010, was used for the recurve elimination rounds. 199 archers competed in the qualification round on 5 July; the top 104 archers qualified for the knockout tournament on 7–8 July, with the semi-finals and finals on 10 July. The tournament doubled as the principal qualification tournament for the 2012 Olympics.

Third seed Kim Woo-jin won the men's individual competition, defeating fellow Korean Oh Jin-hyek in the final in four sets.

== Seeds ==
As well as securing qualification for the 2012 Olympics, the top eight scorers in the qualifying round were seeded, and received byes to the third round.

1. (South Korea) Im Dong-hyun (4th place)
2. (United States) Brady Ellison (3rd place)
3. (South Korea) Kim Woo-jin (Champion)
4. (South Korea) Oh Jin-hyek (2nd place)
5. (India) Jayanta Talukdar (4th round)
6. (United Kingdom) Larry Godfrey (Quarterfinal)
7. (Chinese Taipei) Kuo Cheng-wei (4th round)
8. (Canada) Jason Lyon (Quarterfinal)

== Draw ==
=== Top half ===
==== Section 1 ====
1st round
1	(South Korea) Im Dong-hyun
Bye
33	(United States) Joe Fanchin	0	1	2	2	1
80	(Azerbaijan) Roman Vengerov	2	1	0	0	1
81	(Sri Lanka) Lakmal Chamin Rajasinghe	0	0	0
32	(China) Dai Xiaoxiang	2	2	2
17	(Italy) Mauro Nespoli	0	2	1	2	1
96	(South Africa) Calvin Hartley	2	0	1	0	1
65	(Iran) Keyvan Riyazimehr	2	2	2
48	(Cuba) Juan Carlos Stevens	0	0	0
49	(United States) Jacob Wukie	0	0	1	2	2^{1}
64	(Finland) Aki Virtanen	2	2	1	0	0^{0}
97	(Philippines) Mark Javier	0	0	0
16	(Mexico) Pedro Vivas Alcala	2	2	2

2nd round
1	(South Korea) Im Dong-hyun
Bye
33	(United States) Joe Fanchin	2	0	0	2	0
32	(China) Dai Xiaoxiang	0	2	2	0	2
17	(Italy) Mauro Nespoli	2	2	2
65	(Iran) Keyvan Riyazimehr	0	0	0
49	(United States) Jacob Wukie	0	2	0	0
16	(Mexico) Pedro Vivas Alcala	2	0	2	2

3rd round
1	(South Korea) Im Dong-hyun	0	0	2	2	1^{1}
32	(China) Dai Xiaoxiang	2	2	0	0	1^{0}
17	(Italy) Mauro Nespoli	0	2	0	0
16	(Mexico) Pedro Vivas Alcala	2	0	2	2

4th round
1	(South Korea) Im Dong-hyun	2	2	1	0	2
16	(Mexico) Pedro Vivas Alcala	0	0	1	2	0

==== Section 2 ====
1st round
9	(Mongolia) Jantsan Gantugs	2	2	1	0	2
104	(Republic of Ireland) Keith Hanlon	0	0	1	2	0
57	(United Kingdom) Alan Wills	2	0	0	1	0
56	(Poland) Piotr Nowak	0	2	2	1	2
41	(Japan) Hideki Kikuchi	0	2	1	2	1
72	(India) Rahul Banerjee	2	0	1	0	1
89	(Denmark) Niels Dall	0	0	0
24	(Japan) Takaharu Furukawa	2	2	2
25	(China) Xing Yu	1	2	2	1
88	(Norway) Vetle Risinggard	1	0	0	1
73	(Australia) Ryan Tyack	2	2	0	0	2
40	(Belarus) Anton Prilepau	0	0	2	2	0
8	(Canada) Jason Lyon
Bye

2nd round
9	(Mongolia) Jantsan Gantugs	1	1	2	1	2
56	(Poland) Piotr Nowak	1	1	0	1	0
41	(Japan) Hideki Kikuchi	0	2	0	2	2
24	(Japan) Takaharu Furukawa	2	0	2	0	0
25	(China) Xing Yu	1	0	2	2	2
73	(Australia) Ryan Tyack	1	2	0	0	0
8	(Canada) Jason Lyon
Bye

3rd round
9	(Mongolia) Jantsan Gantugs	1	2	2	0	2
41	(Japan) Hideki Kikuchi	1	0	0	2	0
25	(China) Xing Yu	2	1	0	0	0
8	(Canada) Jason Lyon	0	1	2	2	2

4th round
9	(Mongolia) Jantsan Gantugs	0	0	0
8	(Canada) Jason Lyon	2	2	2

==== Section 3 ====
1st round
5	(India) Jayanta Talukdar
Bye
37	(Russia) Alexey Belov	2	2	2
76	(Australia) Taylor Worth	0	0	0
85	(Myanmar) Nay Myo Aung	1	0	2	0	2^{0}
28	(Finland) Antti Tekoniemi	1	2	0	2	0^{1}
21	(Spain) Antonio Fernández	0	2	2	0	0
92	(Romania) Daniel Ciornei	2	0	0	2	2
69	(Venezuela) Elías Malavé	2	0	0	2	0
44	(Luxembourg) Jeff Henckels	0	2	2	0	2
53	(Spain) Elias Cuesta	1	1	2	2
60	(Indonesia) Riau Ega Agatha	1	1	0	0
101	(Romania) Alexandru Bodnar	0	0	0
12	(France) Jean-Charles Valladont	2	2	2

2nd round
5	(India) Jayanta Talukdar
Bye
37	(Russia) Alexey Belov	0	0	2	2	0
28	(Finland) Antti Tekoniemi	2	2	0	0	2
92	(Romania) Daniel Ciornei	1	0	0	0
44	(Luxembourg) Jeff Henckels	1	2	2	2
53	(Spain) Elias Cuesta	2	0	0	2	2
12	(France) Jean-Charles Valladont	0	2	2	0	0

3rd round
5	(India) Jayanta Talukdar	2	0	0	2	2
28	(Finland) Antti Tekoniemi	0	2	2	0	0
44	(Luxembourg) Jeff Henckels	0	2	2	2
53	(Spain) Elias Cuesta	2	0	0	0

4th round
5	(India) Jayanta Talukdar	1	2	1	0	1^{0}
44	(Luxembourg) Jeff Henckels	1	0	1	2	1^{1}

==== Section 4 ====
1st round
13	(Malaysia) Cheng Chu Sian	2	2	2
100	(Iran) Nader Manoochehrimoghadam	0	0	0
61	(Turkey) Yağız Yılmaz	0	1	0	0
52	(Russia) Alexander Kozhin	2	1	2	2
45	(Brazil) Daniel Xavier	0	1	0	2	2^{1}
68	(Turkey) Göktuğ Ergin	2	1	2	0	0^{0}
93	(Bangladesh) Mohammed Milon	0	0	0
20	(Ukraine) Viktor Ruban	2	2	2
29	(Sweden) Magnus Petersson	0	2	0	2	2
84	(Germany) Jens Pieper	2	0	2	0	0
77	(Belgium) Nico Thiry	0	2	0	1	0
36	(Belgium) Kurt de Backer	2	0	2	1	2
4	(South Korea) Oh Jin-hyek
Bye

2nd round
13	(Malaysia) Cheng Chu Sian	1	2	2	1
52	(Russia) Alexander Kozhin	1	0	0	1
45	(Brazil) Daniel Xavier	2	0	0	2	0
20	(Ukraine) Viktor Ruban	0	2	2	0	2
29	(Sweden) Magnus Petersson	0	2	0	2	0
36	(Belgium) Kurt de Backer	2	0	2	0	2
4	(South Korea) Oh Jin-hyek
Bye

3rd round
13	(Malaysia) Cheng Chu Sian	0	0	1	0
20	(Ukraine) Viktor Ruban	2	2	1	2
36	(Belgium) Kurt de Backer	0	2	0	0
4	(South Korea) Oh Jin-hyek	2	0	2	2

4th round
20	(Ukraine) Viktor Ruban	0	2	0	2	0
4	(South Korea) Oh Jin-hyek	2	0	2	0	2

=== Bottom half ===
==== Section 5 ====
1st round
3	(South Korea) Kim Woo-jin
Bye
35	(Germany) Sebastian Rohrberg	1	1	0	0
78	(Indonesia) Rahmat Sulistiawan	1	1	2	2
83	(Malaysia) Khairul Anuar Mohamad	0	0	2	2	2
30	(Poland) Jacek Proć	2	2	0	0	0
19	(Italy) Marco Galiazzo	2	2	1	2
94	(Finland) Matti Hatava	0	0	1	0
67	(Chinese Taipei) Wang Cheng-pang	0	1	1	2	2
46	(Kazakhstan) Denis Gankin	2	1	1	0	0
51	(Netherlands) Mitch Dielemans	0	1	0	1
62	(India) Tarundeep Rai	2	1	2	1
99	(Iran) Majid Mirrahimi	0	0	2	0
14	(Canada) Crispin Duenas	2	2	0	2

2nd round
3	(South Korea) Kim Woo-jin
Bye
78	(Indonesia) Rahmat Sulistiawan	0	0	2	0
83	(Malaysia) Khairul Anuar Mohamad	2	2	0	2
19	(Italy) Marco Galiazzo	0	1	0	2	2^{1}
67	(Chinese Taipei) Wang Cheng-pang	2	1	2	0	0^{0}
62	(India) Tarundeep Rai	1	2	2	2
14	(Canada) Crispin Duenas	1	0	0	0

3rd round
3	(South Korea) Kim Woo-jin	1	2	1	2
83	(Malaysia) Khairul Anuar Mohamad	1	0	1	0
19	(Italy) Marco Galiazzo	2	1	0	0	2^{1}
62	(India) Tarundeep Rai	0	1	2	2	0^{0}

4th round
3	(South Korea) Kim Woo-jin	2	1	2	2
19	(Italy) Marco Galiazzo	0	1	0	0

==== Section 6 ====
1st round
11	(France) Romain Girouille	2	2	2
102	(Greece) Michail Papavasileiou	0	0	0
59	(Myanmar) Zaw Win Htike	0	2	0	0
54	(Poland) Piotr Piątek	2	0	2	2
43	(Russia) Bair Badenov	2	1	2	2
70	(Belarus) Andrei Auramchyk	0	1	0	0
91	(Egypt) Ibrahim Sabry	0	2	0	2	0
22	(Ukraine) Dmytro Hrachov	2	0	2	0	2
27	(Ukraine) Markiyan Ivashko	2	2	2
86	(Kazakhstan) Konstantin Kim	0	0	0
75	(Bangladesh) Ram Krishna Saha	0	0	0
38	(France) Gaël Prévost	2	2	2
6	(United Kingdom) Laurence Godfrey
Bye

2nd round
11	(France) Romain Girouille	2	2	1	2
54	(Poland) Piotr Piątek	0	0	1	0
43	(Russia) Bair Badenov	0	0	0
22	(Ukraine) Dmytro Hrachov	2	2	2
27	(Ukraine) Markiyan Ivashko	0	2	2	2
38	(France) Gaël Prévost	2	0	0	0
6	(United Kingdom) Laurence Godfrey
Bye

3rd round
11	(France) Romain Girouille	1	0	0	1
22	(Ukraine) Dmytro Hrachov	1	2	2	1
27	(Ukraine) Markiyan Ivashko	2	0	2	0	0
6	(United Kingdom) Laurence Godfrey	0	2	0	2	2

4th round
22	(Ukraine) Dmytro Hrachov	1	0	0	0
6	(United Kingdom) Laurence Godfrey	1	2	2	2

==== Section 7 ====
1st round
7	(Chinese Taipei) Kuo Cheng-wei
Bye
39	(Mexico) Eduardo Vélez	0	1	0	1
74	(North Korea) Jon Chol	2	1	2	1
87	(Croatia) Robert Sandorka	0	0	0
26	(Netherlands) Rick van der Ven	2	2	2
23	(Mongolia) Gombodorj Gan Erdene	2	2	2
90	(El Salvador) Miguel Angel Veliz	0	0	0
71	(Thailand) Witthaya Thamwong	0	2	0	1	0
42	(Norway) Bård Nesteng	2	0	2	1	2
55	(Malaysia) Haziq Kamaruddin	2	0	0	2	2
58	(Denmark) Johan Weiss	0	2	2	0	0
103	(Hungary) Pal Csoregh	0	0	0
10	(Italy) Michele Frangilli	2	2	2

2nd round
7	(Chinese Taipei) Kuo Cheng-wei
Bye
74	(North Korea) Jon Chol	2	0	1	0	1
26	(Netherlands) Rick van der Ven	0	2	1	2	1
23	(Mongolia) Gombodorj Gan Erdene	0	0	1	1
42	(Norway) Bård Nesteng	2	2	1	1
55	(Malaysia) Haziq Kamaruddin	2	1	1	2
10	(Italy) Michele Frangilli	0	1	1	0

3rd round
7	(Chinese Taipei) Kuo Cheng-wei	2	0	2	2
26	(Netherlands) Rick van der Ven	0	2	0	0
42	(Norway) Bård Nesteng	1	2	0	2	0^{1}
55	(Malaysia) Haziq Kamaruddin	1	0	2	0	2^{0}

4th round
7	(Chinese Taipei) Kuo Cheng-wei	0	2	0	0
42	(Norway) Bård Nesteng	2	0	2	2

==== Section 8 ====
1st round
15	(Mexico) Juan René Serrano	2	2	0	2
98	(Armenia) Vasil Shahnazaryan	0	0	2	0
63	(Belarus) Maxim Kunda	1	0	0	2	0
50	(Chinese Taipei) Tien Kang	1	2	2	0	2
47	(El Salvador) Oscar Guillen Ticas	2	1	1	2
66	(Cyprus) Mimis El Helali	0	1	1	0
95	(Netherlands) Rick van den Oever	2	2	0	2
18	(China) Chen Wenyuan	0	0	2	0
31	(United Kingdom) Simon Terry	1	2	0	2	1
82	(Israel) Guy Matzkin	1	0	2	0	1
79	(Cyprus) Constantinos Christodoulou	2	1	1	0	0
34	(Germany) Florian Floto	0	1	1	2	2
2	(United States) Brady Ellison
Bye

2nd round
15	(Mexico) Juan René Serrano	1	2	2	2
50	(Chinese Taipei) Tien Kang	1	0	0	0
47	(El Salvador) Oscar Guillen Ticas	2	0	0	2	0
95	(Netherlands) Rick van den Oever	0	2	2	0	2
31	(United Kingdom) Simon Terry	1	0	1	2	0
34	(Germany) Florian Floto	1	2	1	0	2
2	(United States) Brady Ellison
Bye

3rd round
15	(Mexico) Juan René Serrano	1	2	2	0	2
95	(Netherlands) Rick van den Oever	1	0	0	2	0
34	(Germany) Florian Floto	0	2	0	0
2	(United States) Brady Ellison	2	0	2	2

4th round
15	(Mexico) Juan René Serrano	0	2	0	0
2	(United States) Brady Ellison	2	0	2	2

== Finals ==
Quarterfinals
1	(South Korea) Im Dong-hyun	2
8	(Canada) Jason Lyon	0
44	(Luxembourg) Jeff Henckels	0
4	(South Korea) Oh Jin-hyek	2
3	(South Korea) Kim Woo-jin	2
6	(United Kingdom) Larry Godfrey	0
42	(Norway) Bård Nesteng	0
2	(United States) Brady Ellison	2

Semifinals
1	(South Korea) Im Dong-hyun	2
4	(South Korea) Oh Jin-hyek	0
3	(South Korea) Kim Woo-jin	2
2	(United States) Brady Ellison	0

Finals
4	(South Korea) Oh Jin-hyek	1
3	(South Korea) Kim Woo-jin	1
Third place
1	(South Korea) Im Dong-hyun	0
2	(United States) Brady Ellison	2
