= Malaysia at the 2008 Summer Olympics =

- IOC code: MAS
- NOC: Olympic Council of Malaysia
- Website: www.olympic.org.my (in English)

in Beijing
- Competitors: 32 in 10 sports
- Flag bearers: Azizulhasni Awang (opening); Elizabeth Jimie (closing)
- Medals Ranked 72nd: Gold 0 Silver 1 Bronze 0 Total 1

Summer Olympics appearances (overview)
- 1956; 1960; 1964; 1968; 1972; 1976; 1980; 1984; 1988; 1992; 1996; 2000; 2004; 2008; 2012; 2016; 2020; 2024

Other related appearances
- North Borneo (1956)

Malaysia competed in the 2008 Summer Olympics, held in Beijing, People's Republic of China. Malaysia had 32 athletes who took part in ten sports in the games. Lee Chong Wei won the nation's first medal in twelve years in the badminton men's singles final despite losing to Lin Dan, from the host country China. It was the second silver medal ever won throughout Malaysia's participation history since its nationhood in 1957. Hockey legend Dato Ho Koh Chye was the chef-de-mission of the delegation.

== Medalists ==
Medal	Name	Sport	Event
Silver	Lee Chong Wei	Badminton	Men's singles

== Archery ==
Malaysia will send archers to the Olympics for the second time, seeking the nation's first Olympic medal in the sport. Only men qualified for Malaysia, with Cheng Chu Sian and Muhammad Marbawi Sulaiman earning spots for the country by placing 8th and 27th, respectively, at the 2007 World Outdoor Target Championships and Wan Khalmizam Wan Abd Aziz adding a third spot with his third-place finish at the Asian championships.

Athlete	Event	Ranking round		Round of 64	Round of 32	Round of 16	Quarterfinals	Semifinals	Final / BM	
Athlete	Event	Score	Seed	Opposition Score	Opposition Score	Opposition Score	Opposition Score	Opposition Score	Opposition Score	Rank
Khalmizam Aziz	Men's individual	674	5	Bodnar (ROU) (60); L 105–106	Did not advance					
Cheng Chu Sian	Men's individual	660	26	Gray (AUS) (39); W 109–101	Hatava (FIN) (58); W 110–103	Lee C-H (KOR) (10); W 105 (19)–105 (18)	Badënov (RUS) (31); L 104–109	Did not advance		
Muhammad Sulaiman	Men's individual	659	27	Chen S-Y (TPE) (38); L 106–107	Did not advance					
Khalmizam Aziz; Cheng Chu Sian; Muhammad Sulaiman	Men's team	1993	3	—N/a		Bye	Italy (6); L 213–218	Did not advance		

== Athletics ==
Key

- Note–Ranks given for track events are within the athlete's heat only
- Q = Qualified for the next round
- q = Qualified for the next round as a fastest loser or, in field events, by position without achieving the qualifying target
- NR = National record
- N/A = Round not applicable for the event
- Bye = Athlete not required to compete in round

Men

Athlete	Event	Qualification		Final	
Athlete	Event	Distance	Position	Distance	Position
Lee Hup Wei	High jump	2.20	32	did not advance	

Women
Track & road events

Athlete	Event	Final	
Athlete	Event	Result	Rank
Yuan Yufang	20 km walk	DNF	

Field events

Athlete	Event	Qualification		Final	
Athlete	Event	Distance	Position	Distance	Position
Roslinda Samsu	Pole vault	4.30	=16	did not advance	

== Badminton ==
Men

Athlete	Event	Round of 64	Round of 32	Round of 16	Quarterfinals	Semifinals	Final / BM	
Athlete	Event	Opposition Score	Opposition Score	Opposition Score	Opposition Score	Opposition Score	Opposition Score	Rank
Lee Chong Wei	Singles	Bye	Susilo (SIN); W 21–13, 21–14	Navickas (LTU); W 21–5, 21–7	Kuncoro (INA); W 21–9, 21–11	Lee H-i (KOR); W 21–18, 13–21, 21–13	Lin D (CHN); L 12–21, 8–21	2nd place, silver medalist(s)
Wong Choong Hann	Singles	Bye	Hidayat (INA); W 21–19, 21–16	Hsieh Y-H (TPE); L 21–14, 17–21, 18–21	Did not advance			
Choong Tan Fook; Lee Wan Wah	Doubles	—N/a		Hwang J-m / Lee J-j (KOR); L 22–20, 13–21, 16–21	Did not advance			
Koo Kien Keat; Tan Boon Heong	Doubles	—N/a		Sakamoto / Ikeda (JPN); W 21–12, 21–16	Kido / Setiawan (INA); L 16–21, 18–21	Did not advance		

Women

Athlete	Event	Round of 64	Round of 32	Round of 16	Quarterfinals	Semifinals	Final / BM	
Athlete	Event	Opposition Score	Opposition Score	Opposition Score	Opposition Score	Opposition Score	Opposition Score	Rank
Wong Mew Choo	Singles	Bye	Harrington (RSA); W 21–4, 21–4	Nedelcheva (BUL); W 21–16, 21–8	Lu L (CHN); L 7–21, 27–29	Did not advance		
Chin Eei Hui; Wong Pei Tty	Doubles	—N/a		Lee H-j / Lee K-w (KOR); L 14–21, 19–21	Did not advance			

== Cycling ==
=== Track ===
Sprint

Athlete	Event	Qualification		Round 1	Repechage 1	Round 2	Repechage 2	Quarterfinals	Semifinals	Final	
Athlete	Event	Time Speed (km/h)	Rank	Opposition Time Speed (km/h)	Opposition Time Speed (km/h)	Opposition Time Speed (km/h)	Opposition Time Speed (km/h)	Opposition Time Speed (km/h)	Opposition Time Speed (km/h)	Opposition Time Speed (km/h)	Rank
Azizulhasni Awang	Men's sprint	10.272; 70.093	7 Q	Bayley (AUS); L	Kitatsuru (JPN); Kwiatkowski (POL); W 10.959; 65.699	Kenny (GBR); L	Nimke (GER); Chiappa (ITA); W 11.010; 65.395	Hoy (GBR); L	Did not advance	5th place final Sireau (FRA); Mulder (NED); Bos (NED); L	8
Azizulhasni Awang; Josiah Ng; Mohd Rizal Tisin	Men's team sprint	44.725; 60.368	7 Q	France; L 44.822; 60.238	—N/a					Did not advance	7

Keirin

Athlete	Event	1st Round	Repechage	2nd Round	Final
Athlete	Event	Rank	Rank	Rank	Rank
Azizulhasni Awang	Men's keirin	1 Q	Bye	4	10
Josiah Ng	Men's keirin	2 Q	Bye	4	9

== Diving ==
Men

Athlete	Event	Preliminaries		Semifinals		Final	
Athlete	Event	Points	Rank	Points	Rank	Points	Rank
Bryan Nickson Lomas	10 m platform	384.35	26	Did not advance			

Women

Athlete	Event	Preliminaries		Semifinals		Final	
Athlete	Event	Points	Rank	Points	Rank	Points	Rank
Elizabeth Jimie	3 m springboard	253.50	=21	Did not advance			
Leong Mun Yee	3 m springboard	253.50	=21	Did not advance			
Pandelela Rinong	10 m platform	249.20	27	Did not advance			

== Sailing ==
Men

Athlete	Event	Race											Net points	Final rank
Athlete	Event	1	2	3	4	5	6	7	8	9	10	M*	Net points	Final rank
Kevin Lim	Laser	~~BFD~~	24	28	42	22	34	34	39	26	CAN	EL	249	38

M = Medal race; EL = Eliminated – did not advance into the medal race; CAN = Race cancelled

== Shooting ==
Men

Athlete	Event	Qualification		Final	
Athlete	Event	Points	Rank	Points	Rank
Hasli Izwan Amir Hasan	25 m rapid fire pistol	564	15	Did not advance	

== Swimming ==
Men

Athlete	Event	Heat		Semifinal		Final	
Athlete	Event	Time	Rank	Time	Rank	Time	Rank
Daniel Bego	200 m freestyle	1:50.92 NR	44	Did not advance			
Daniel Bego	100 m butterfly	54.38	54	Did not advance			
Daniel Bego	200 m butterfly	2:01.28	37	Did not advance			

Women

Athlete	Event	Heat		Semifinal		Final	
Athlete	Event	Time	Rank	Time	Rank	Time	Rank
Khoo Cai Lin	400 m freestyle	4:23.37	38	—N/a		Did not advance	
Khoo Cai Lin	800 m freestyle	9:04.86	34	—N/a		Did not advance	
Leung Chii Lin	50 m freestyle	26.75	48	Did not advance			
Lew Yih Wey	400 m individual medley	4:55.83	34	—N/a		Did not advance	
Siow Yi Ting	200 m breaststroke	2:27.80	19	Did not advance			
Siow Yi Ting	200 m individual medley	2:17.11	29	Did not advance			

== Taekwondo ==
Athlete	Event	Round of 16	Quarterfinals	Semifinals	Repechage	Bronze medal	Final	
Athlete	Event	Opposition Result	Opposition Result	Opposition Result	Opposition Result	Opposition Result	Opposition Result	Rank
Elaine Teo	Women's −57 kg	Tanrıkulu (TUR); L 4–7	Did not advance		D López (USA); L 0–3	Did not advance		
Che Chew Chan	Women's +67 kg	Karimova (UZB); W 5–4	Solheim (NOR); L 1–3	Did not advance	Abd Rabo (EGY); L 1–5	Did not advance		

== Weightlifting ==
Athlete	Event	Snatch		Clean & jerk		Total	Rank
Athlete	Event	Result	Rank	Result	Rank	Total	Rank
Amirul Hamizan Ibrahim	Men's −56 kg	121	8	144	9	265	8

== See also ==
- Malaysia at the 2008 Summer Paralympics
