= Daniel Morillo =

Spanish archer (born 1988)

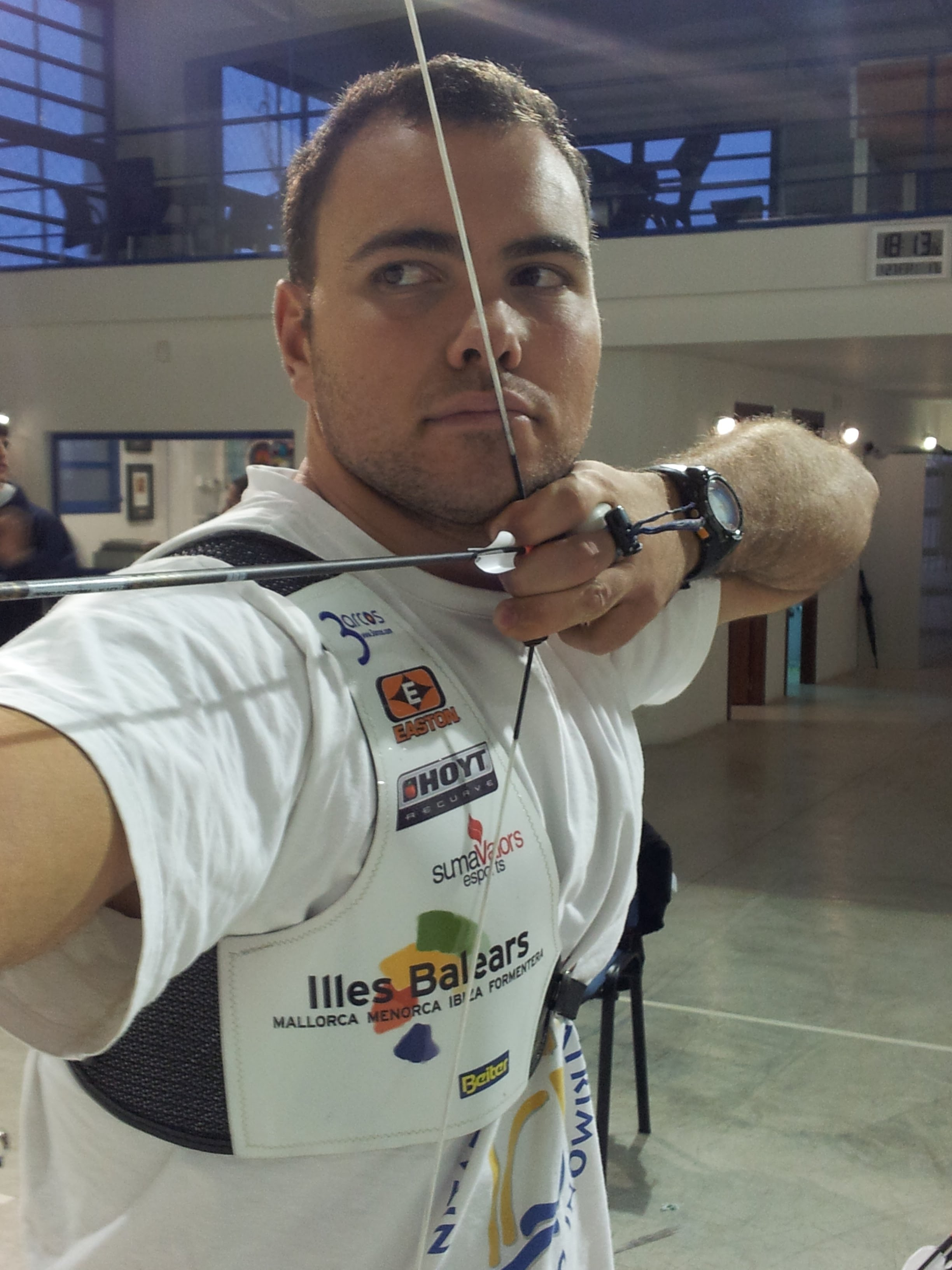
Daniel Morillo

Daniel Morillo (born 21 January 1988) is an athlete from Spain, who competes in archery.

== Early life ==
Morillo was born on 21 January 1988 in Ibiza, Balearic Islands, Spain. He is affiliated to the Club S'arc d'Eivissa.

== Career ==
Morillo competed for Spain at the 2006 European Archery Championships in Athens, Greece.

In the men's recurve individual, Morillo scored 575 points in the ranking round and was seeded 10th overall. In the first round, he defeated Brendan Chanlon of Ireland 105–100. In the second round, he defeated Jacek Proć of Poland 104–96. In the third round, he defeated Yury Leontyev of Russia 108–101. In the quarter-finals, he defeated Balzhinima Tsyrempilov of Russia 102–95. His run came to an end in the semi-finals where he narrowly lost 97–96 to eventual champion Magnus Petersson of Sweden. He also narrowly missed out on the bronze medal, losing 102–100 against Piotr Piątek of Poland.

In the men's recurve team, Morillo helped Spain to a silver medal, missing out on gold after losing 193–191 against Belarus in the final.

Morillo qualified to represent Spain at the 2008 Summer Olympics in Beijing, China.

In the ranking round for the men's individual, Morillo scored a total of 657 points and was seeded 33rd overall. In the first round, he faced Markiyan Ivashko of Ukraine and won 115-107 to advance. However, in the second round, Morillo faced Juan René Serrano of Mexico. Serrano was the top-seeded archer after he scored 679 points in the ranking round. In a tight match, Serrano came out on top, winning 112-111 and advancing to the next round.
