= Mauro Nespoli =

Italian archer (born 1987)

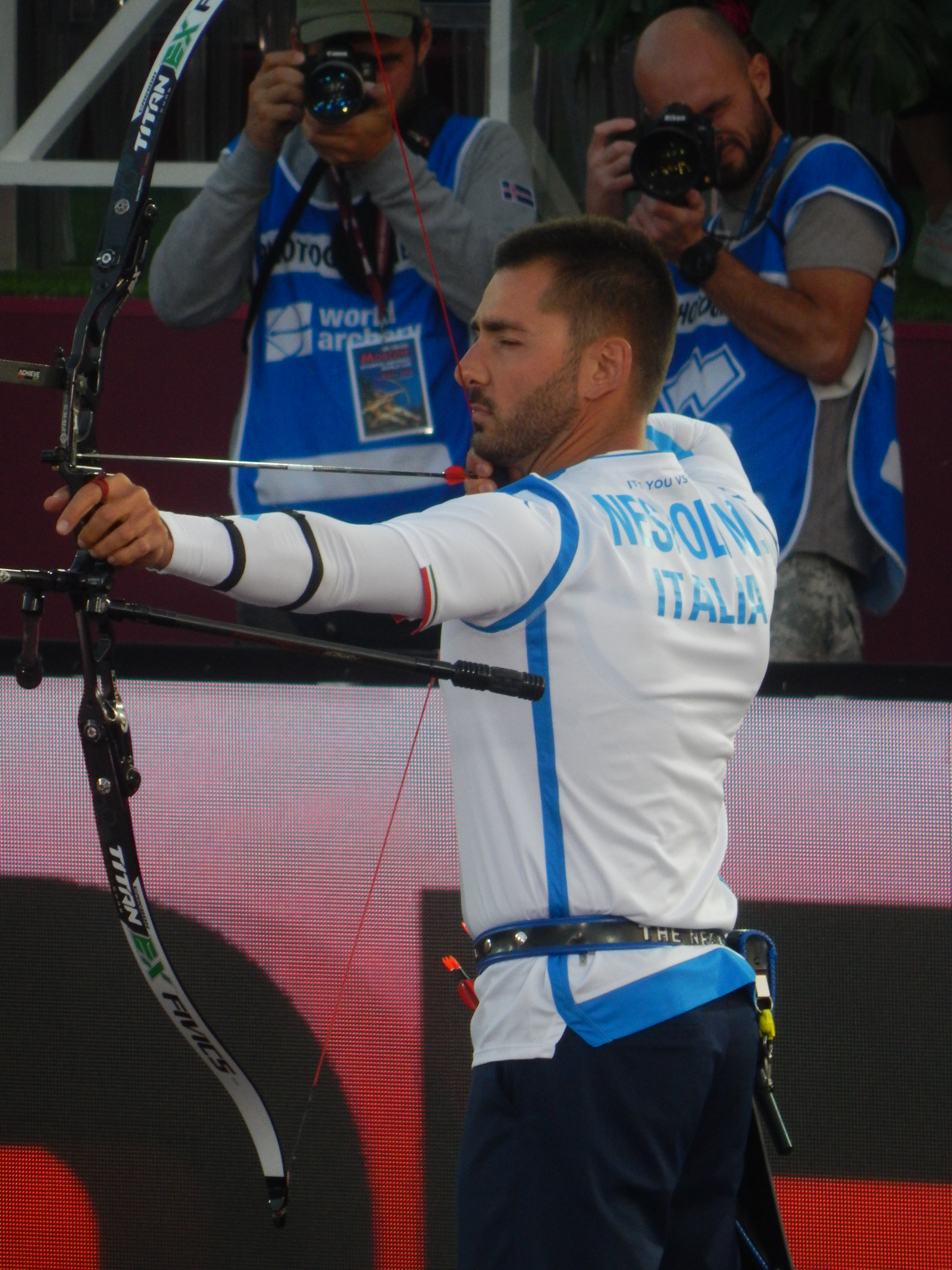
- Nespoli at the 2019 World Cup Final

Personal information
- Born: 22 November 1987 (age 38) Voghera, Italy
- Height: 1.81 m (5 ft 11 in)
Medal record
Event	1st	2nd	3rd
Olympic Games	1	2	0
World Championships	1	1	3
World Indoor Championships	0	1	0
European Games	4	0	1
European Championships	4	3	1
European Indoor Championships	1	0	2
Mediterranean Games	0	1	2
Military World Games	0	3	0
Total	11	11	9
Men's recurve archery
Representing Italy
Olympic Games
Gold medal – first place	2012 London	Team
Silver medal – second place	2008 Beijing	Team
Silver medal – second place	2020 Tokyo	Individual
World Championships
Gold medal – first place	2017 Mexico City	Team
Silver medal – second place	2015 Copenhagen	Team
Bronze medal – third place	2011 Turin	Team
Bronze medal – third place	2019 's-Hertogenbosch	Mixed team
Bronze medal – third place	2023 Berlin	Mixed team
World Indoor Championships
Silver medal – second place	2009 Rzeszow	Team
European Games
Gold medal – first place	2015 Baku	Mixed team
Gold medal – first place	2019 Minsk	Individual
Gold medal – first place	2019 Minsk	Mixed team
Gold medal – first place	2023 Kraków-Małopolska	Team
Bronze medal – third place	2019 Minsk	Team
European Archery Championships
Gold medal – first place	2008 Vittel	Team
Gold medal – first place	2012 Amsterdam	Mixed team
Gold medal – first place	2018 Legnica	Mixed team
Gold medal – first place	2022 Munich	Team
Silver medal – second place	2012 Amsterdam	Team
Silver medal – second place	2018 Legnica	Team
Silver medal – second place	2024 Essen	Team
Silver medal – second place	2026 Antalya	Individual
Bronze medal – third place	2022 Munich	Mixed team
European Indoor Championships
Gold medal – first place	2011 Cambrils	Individual
Gold medal – first place	2024 Varaždin	Individual
Silver medal – second place	2024 Varaždin	Team
Bronze medal – third place	2022 Laško	Team
Bronze medal – third place	2011 Cambrils	Team
Mediterranean Games
Silver medal – second place	2022 Oran	Mixed team
Bronze medal – third place	2013 Mersin	Team
Bronze medal – third place	2022 Oran	Individual
Military World Games
Silver medal – second place	2015 Mungyeong	Individual
Silver medal – second place	2019 Wuhan	Team
Silver medal – second place	2019 Wuhan	Mixed team

Mauro Nespoli (born 22 November 1987) is an Italian archer. He won individual silver at the 2020 Tokyo Summer Olympics and was a member of the Italian teams that won gold at the 2012 Summer Olympics and silver at the 2008 Summer Olympics.

== Biography ==
Nespoli was born in Voghera (Province of Pavia), the place where he has always lived. He first saw some archers when he was nine, while he was spending his holidays in Aprica (Sondrio). His coach is Luciano Malovini, who was an archer of the Paralympic Italian National Team. In spite of his hard training and attending archery events, Nespoli could achieve good marks at school. He got his graduation Diploma in 2006 and he is now attending university, in Pavia, studying Computer Engineering.

== Sports career ==
He won his first gold medal in the Italian "Giochi della Gioventù" (Youth Games) in 1998. When he was only fourteen, in 2002, he was picked for the Italian Junior National Team for the first time. Since 2006 he has been a member of the Italian Senior National Team, together with Marco Galiazzo and Michele Frangilli. In his brief sport career, Nespoli has already participated in 20 international competitions with the Italian National Team and achieved several records too.

At the 2008 Summer Olympics in Beijing Nespoli finished his ranking round with a total of 649 points. This made him the 44th seed for the final competition bracket in which he faced Alan Wills in the first round. Wills won the match 103–99 and went on to reach the third round in which he lost to Juan Carlos Stevens.

Together with Marco Galiazzo and Ilario Di Buò he also took part in the team event. With his 649 score from the ranking round combined with the 667 of Galiazzo and the 670 of Di Buò the Italians were in sixth position after the ranking round. In the first round they were too strong for the Canadian team 219–217. They advanced to the semi-final by eliminating Malaysia 218–213. After that they reached the final by beating Ukraine 223–221. In the final they managed to get 225 points, but South Korea took the gold medal with 227 points.

At the 2012 Summer Olympics, he was eleventh after the ranking round, scoring 674, but lost to Chen Yu-Cheng in the first round. In the team event, Italy were ranked in 6th after the ranking round. Italy proceeded to beat Chinese Taipei 216–206 in the first round, China 220–216 in the quarterfinals, Mexico 217–215 in the semifinals and the United States 219–218 in the final.

His final opponent at the 2020 Tokyo Olympics was Mete Gazoz who beat him 6–4.

He won the bronze medal in the men's team recurve event at the 2022 European Indoor Archery Championships held in Laško, Slovenia. He won the gold medal in the men's team recurve event at the 2022 European Archery Championships held in Munich, Germany. Nespoli and Tatiana Andreoli won the bronze medal in the mixed team recurve event.

He represented Italy in the 2024 Summer Olympics; he became a viral phenomenon when viewers dubbed him "the Italian Eminem" due to his seeming similarity to the artist.

=== Performance timeline in Outdoor Recurve ===
==== Individual ====
Tournament	2007	2008	2009	2010	2011	2012	2013	2014	2015	2016	2017	2018	2019	2020	2021	SR
World Archery tournaments
Olympic Games		1R				1R				QF					2nd	0/4
World Championships			2R		3R		3R		QF		3R		4th		2R	0/7
World Cup																
Stage 1		3R	2R	1R	3R	4R	QF		2R			QF	3R	NH		0/9
Stage 2	4th	2R	1R		3R	3R	4th	2R	3R	4R	3R	QF		NH	QF	0/12
Stage 3	1R	1R		1R	1R	3R	QF	3R	4th	4R	4R	W	4th	NH	QF	1/13
Stage 4	3R	1R					3R	2nd	2R		3R	QF	3rd	NH		0/8
World Cup Final	DNQ	DNQ	DNQ	DNQ	DNQ	DNQ	QF	DNQ	DNQ	DNQ	DNQ	QF	2nd	NH	QF	0/4
End of year world ranking	21	34	79	108	31	29	10	11	10	11	24	4	4	5		

==== Team ====
Tournament	2007	2008	2009	2010	2011	2012	2013	2014	2015	2016	2017	2018	2019	2020	2021	SR
World Archery tournaments
Olympic Games		2nd				W				QF						1/3
World Championships			1R		3rd		QF		2nd		W		2R		2R	1/7
World Cup																
Stage 1		3rd	1R		QF	1R	QF		1R			2R	2R	NH		0/8
Stage 2	QF	2nd			1R	QF	1R	QF	QF	QF	W	2R		NH	3rd	1/11
Stage 3	QF	1R			QF	4th		1R	4th	1R	1R	4th	2nd	NH	2R	0/11
Stage 4	W	1R					4th	1R			1R	QF	1R	NH		1/7
End of year world ranking								11	5	10	4	3	10	9		

== Records ==
World records (Junior)	European Records (Cadet)	Italian Records (Junior)	Italian Records (Senior)
14 November 2004 Gallarate, Italy 25m – 582 Points 2–5 June 2003 Cles, Italy 70m O.R.	25 April 2003 Montesegale, Italy 70m – 640 Points	16 October 2005 Castel D'Ario, Italy 25+18m – 1156 Points	22 April 2007 Cherasco, Italy 90m – 329 Points

== Medals ==
- 1 Gold Team medal in the World Cup;
- 1 Silver Team medal in the Indoor World Championship;
- 1 Bronze Team medal in the Outdoor World Championship;
- 1 Bronze Team medal in the Outdoor European Championship;
- 1 Gold Individual medal in the Outdoor European Junior Cup;
- 3 Bronze Team medals in the Outdoor European Junior Cup;
- 1 Bronze Individual medal in the Outdoor European Junior Cup;
- 5 Gold Individual medals in the Indoor/Outdoor Italian Championship;
- 1 Gold Team medal in the Indoor Italian Championship 2003;
- 1 Silver Individual medal in the Outdoor Italian Championship 2007;
- 2 Silver Individual medals in the Italian Indoor Championship 2008;
- 1 Gold medal in the Nîmes European Archery Tournament (Indoor) 2007.
- 1 Gold Team medal in the London Olympic Games 2012;
