= Archery at the 2013 Mediterranean Games =

- Venue: Macit Özcan Sports Complex
- Location: Mersin, Turkey
- Dates: 22-24 June 2013

The archery competitions at the 2013 Mediterranean Games in Mersin took place between 22 June and 24 June at the Macit Özcan Sports Complex. For the first time since 2005, archery competitions were held.

Athletes competed in four recurve archery events.

== Medal summary ==
=== Medalists ===
| Event | Gold | Silver | Bronze |
|---|---|---|---|
| Men's individual | Antonio Fernandez; Spain | Michele Frangilli; Italy | Alberto Zagami; Italy |
| Men's team | Egypt (EGY); Hady Elkholosy; Ahmed Elnemr; Ibrahim Sabry | Spain (ESP); Elias Cuesta; Antonio Fernandez; Juan Ignacio Rodriguez | Italy (ITA); Michele Frangilli; Mauro Nespoli; Alberto Zagami |
| Women's individual | Guendalina Sartori; Italy | Mirene Etxeberria Ferrer; Spain | Natalia Valeeva; Italy |
| Women's team | Italy (ITA); Claudia Mandia; Guendalina Sartori; Natalia Valeeva | Spain (ESP); Mirene Etxeberria Ferrer; Elena Fernandez; Magali Foulon | France (FRA); Aurelie Carlier; Melanie Gaubil; Sophie Planeix |

=== Medal table ===
Key:

| Rank | Nation | Gold | Silver | Bronze | Total |
|---|---|---|---|---|---|
| 1 | Italy | 2 | 1 | 3 | 6 |
| 2 | Spain | 1 | 3 | 0 | 4 |
| 3 | Egypt | 1 | 0 | 0 | 1 |
| 4 | France | 0 | 0 | 1 | 1 |
| Totals (4 entries) | | 4 | 4 | 4 | 12 |
