= Ibrahim Sabry =

Egyptian archer

Medal record

Men's archery

Representing Egypt

Youth Olympic Games
Gold medal – first place	2010 Singapore	Individual

Mediterranean Games
Gold medal – first place	2013 Mersin	Team

Ibrahim Sabry is an Egyptian archer who participated at the 2010 Summer Youth Olympics in Singapore. He won the gold medal in the boys' event, defeating Rick van den Oever of the Netherlands in the final.
