= Hojjatollah Vaezi =

Iranian archer (born 1977)

Hojjatollah Vaezi (born March 27, 1977) is an athlete from Iran, who competes in archery.

== 2008 Summer Olympics ==
At the 2008 Summer Olympics in Beijing Hojjatolah finished his ranking round with a total of 604 points, which gave him the 63rd seed for the final competition bracket in which he faced Mangal Singh Champia in the first round. Champia won the match by 112-98 and Hojjatolah was eliminated. Champia would lose in the next round against Bair Badënov.
