= Andrey Abramov (archer) =

Russian archer (born 1984)

Personal information
- Citizenship: Russia
- Born: 3 July 1984 (age 41) Cheboksary, Chuvashia, Russia

Sport
- Country: Russia
- Sport: Archery
Medal record
Men's recurve archery
Representing Russia
Summer Universiade
Bronze medal – third place	2005 Izmir	Team

Andrey Viktorovich Abramov (Russian: Андрей Викторович Абрамов; born 3 July 1984 in Cheboksary, Chuvashia) is an athlete from Russia, who competes in archery.

== 2008 Summer Olympics ==
At the 2008 Summer Olympics in Beijing Abramov finished his ranking round with a total of 660 points, which gave him the 25th seed for the final competition bracket in which he faced Butch Johnson in the first round. Both archers came to a score of 109 points in the regular match. In the extra round that was needed to create a decision Abramov scored 25 points, but Johnson came to 26 points and went through to the next round.

Together with Bair Badënov and Balzhinima Tsyrempilov he also took part in the team event. With his 660 score from the ranking round combined with the 658 of Badënov and the 671 of Tsyrempilov Russia was in fourth position after the ranking round, which gave them a straight seed into the quarter finals. However, with 217-209 they were beaten by the team from China that eventually won the bronze medal.
