= Daniel Pavlov =

Bulgarian archer (born 1967)

Daniel Pavlov (Bulgarian: Даниел Павлов; born November 6, 1967, in Cherven Bryag) is an athlete from Bulgaria, who competes in archery.

== 2008 Summer Olympics ==
At the 2008 Summer Olympics in Beijing Pavlov finished his ranking round with a total of 618 points, which gave him the 59th seed for the final competition bracket in which he faced Balzhinima Tsyrempilov in the first round. Tsyrempilov won the match by 112-102 and Pavlov was eliminated. Tsyrempilov would lose in the third round against Ryuichi Moriya.
