= Archery at the Military World Games =

Archery has been contested at the Military World Games since the 2015 edition.

== Editions ==
- Archery at the 2015 Military World Games
- Archery at the 2019 Military World Games

== All-time medal table ==
2015–2019
Rank	Nation	Gold	Silver	Bronze	Total
1	Italy (ITA)	4	3	1	8
2	France (FRA)	2	2	3	7
3	South Korea (KOR)	2	1	2	5
4	China (CHN)	1	4	1	6
5	Russia (RUS)	1	1	1	3
6	Mongolia (MGL)	1	1	0	2
7	Belarus (BLR)	1	0	2	3
8	Brazil (BRA)	1	0	1	2
8	Germany (GER)	1	0	1	2
10	Greece (GRE)	1	0	0	1
11	Netherlands (NED)	0	1	0	1
11	Poland (POL)	0	1	0	1
11	United States (USA)	0	1	0	1
14	India (IND)	0	0	1	1
14	North Korea (PRK)	0	0	1	1
14	Romania (ROU)	0	0	1	1
Totals (16 entries)		15	15	15	45
