= Viktor Ruban =

Ukrainian archer (born 1981)

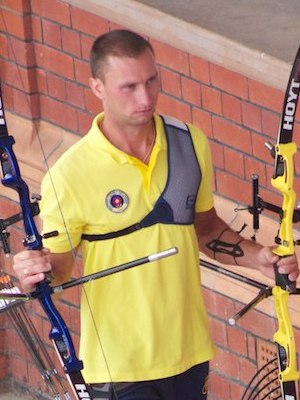
- Ruban at the 2012 Olympics

Medal record

Men's Archery

Representing Ukraine

Olympic Games
Gold medal – first place	2008 Beijing	Individual
Bronze medal – third place	2004 Athens	Team

World Archery Championships
Bronze medal – third place	2009 Ulsan	Individual

World Indoor Championships
Gold medal – first place	2014 Nîmes	Team
Silver medal – second place	2014 Nîmes	Individual
Bronze medal – third place	2012 Las Vegas	Team
Bronze medal – third place	2018 Yankton	Team

World Cup Final
Silver medal – second place	2008 Lausanne	Individual

European Games
Gold medal – first place	2015 Baku	Men's team

European Archery Championships
Bronze medal – third place	2012 Amsterdam	Team
Bronze medal – third place	2016 Nottingham	Mixed team

European Indoor Championships
Gold medal – first place	2002 Ankara	Individual
Gold medal – first place	2006 Jaén	Team
Gold medal – first place	2011 Cambrils	Team
Gold medal – first place	2024 Varaždin	Team
Silver medal – second place	2010 Poreč	Team
Bronze medal – third place	2011 Cambrils	Individual
Bronze medal – third place	2019 Samsun	Team

Universiade
Gold medal – first place	2005 İzmir	Team
Gold medal – first place	2009 Belgrade	Individual

Viktor Hennadiyovych Ruban (Ukrainian: Віктор Геннадійович Рубан; born 24 May 1981 in Kharkiv) is a Ukrainian archer. He is an Olympic gold medal winner and former world number one.

== 2004 Summer Olympics ==
Ruban competed at the 2004 Summer Olympics in men's individual archery. He won his first match, advancing to the round of 32; he also won his second match, advancing to the round of 16. In the third match, he lost to Laurence Godfrey of Great Britain. Ruban placed 13th overall. Ruban was also a member of the bronze medal Ukrainian men's archery team at the 2004 Summer Olympics.

== 2008 Summer Olympics ==
At the 2008 Summer Olympics in Beijing Ruban finished his ranking round with a total of 678 points, one point behind Juan René Serrano and equal with Mangal Singh Champia. This gave him the third seed for the final competition bracket in which he faced Maged Youssef in the first round, beating the Egyptian 111-96. In the second round Ruban was too strong for Michael Naray (115-105) and via Jacek Proć (114-108) in the third round he advanced to the quarter-finals. There he had no problem beating Moriya Ryuichi 115-106. In the semi-final he and his opponent Bair Badënov both came to 112 points and an extra round was needed. Here Ruban scored 20 points and Badënov 18, which brought Ruban into the final. In the final he claimed the gold by beating Park Kyung-Mo by 113-112.

Together with Markiyan Ivashko and Oleksandr Serdyuk he also took part in the team event. With the highest score from the ranking round combined with the 676 of Serdyuk and the 658 of Ivashko Ukraine were in second position after the ranking round, which gave them a straight seed into the quarter-finals. With 214-211 they defeated the Chinese Taipei team, but in the semi-final they were eliminated by Italy 223-221. In the challenge for the bronze medal China was too strong with 222-219.

== Individual performance timeline ==
Tournament	2001	2002	2003	2004	2005	2006	2007	2008	2009	2010	2011	2012	2013	2014	2015	2016	SR
World Archery tournaments
Olympic Games				3R				W				QF				2R	1/4
World Championships	2R		1R		QF		3R		3rd		4R		3R		4R		0/6
World Cup																	
Stage 1						1R				1R	3rd	2R	4R	2R			0/6
Stage 2						1R	1R	QF	3R	3R	4R	QF	4R		4R		0/9
Stage 3							1R	3R	1R		3R			1R		3R	0/6
Stage 4								W	1R	QF			3R	2R			1/5
World Cup Final						DNQ	DNQ	2nd	DNQ	DNQ	DNQ	DNQ	DNQ	DNQ	DNQ		0/1
End of year world ranking	32	22	16	9	17	37	81	2	1	10	9	14	20	46	33		
