= Luiz Trainini =

Brazilian archer (born 1978)

Personal information
- Born: 14 January 1978 (age 48) Canoas, Brazil

Sport
- Sport: Archery

Luiz Gustavo Trainini (born 14 January 1978, in Canoas) is an athlete from Brazil, who competes in archery.

== 2008 Summer Olympics ==
At the 2008 Summer Olympics in Beijing Trainini finished his ranking round with a total of 610 points, which gave him the 61st seed for the final competition bracket in which he faced Park Kyung-Mo in the first round. Park won the match by 116-99 and Trainini was eliminated. Park would go on to win the silver medal in the tournament.
