= Sky Kim =

Korean-Australian archer (born 1982)

Personal information
- Nickname: Sky
- Nationality: Australian
- Born: Ha-Neul Kim; 24 November 1982 (age 43) Daegu, Gyeongbuk, South Korea

Sport
- Country: Australia
- Sport: Archery
- Event: Men's recurve
Medal record
Archery
Representing Australia

Ha-Neul "Sky" Kim (born 24 November 1982) is an Australian Olympic archer.

== Personal ==
Sky's full name is Ha-Neul "Sky" Kim. He is originally from South Korea, and was born in Daegu, North Gyeongsang Province, South Korea on 24 November 1982. He moved to Australia in 2005. In 2006, he became an Australian citizen. He is 183 centimetres (72 in) tall and weighs 95 kilograms (209 lb). His father and brother were archers. He is married to a fellow archer, Hyun-Ok Jung, whom he met while training in archery in 2000.

== Archery ==
Kim competes in archery. He was an Australian Institute of Sport scholarship holder. He was coached by Ki-Sik Lee, the head coach of the Australian Institute of Sport team in 2005. To help with his training for archery, he has been known to do mountain climbing and play golf.

In 2004, he was the Korean national archery champion. In 2007, he competed at a Beijing-based test event, where he won a gold medal. In 2008, he was training at the Australian Institute of Sport. Going into the 2008 Games, he was coached by Australian Institute of Sport coach Kynmoon Oh. At the 2008 World Cup in Santo Domingo Dominican Republic, he was part of the Australian silver medal winning recurve team that. He returned to the Australian archery team in 2011 after an absence dating back to the 2008 Olympics. He attended a national team training camp in Canberra in September 2011. He attended a national team training camp in Canberra in March 2012. At the 2012 National Target Archery Championships, he finished first as a member of AACT. In May 2012, he had to miss a national team in a training camp in Buderim because he had work commitments.

=== Olympics ===
In 2004, he was the Korean national archery champion. He aimed for Olympic selection from Korea but did not make the team. At the 2008 Summer Olympics in Beijing Kim finished his ranking round with a total of 665 points. This gave him the 14th seed for the final competition bracket in which he faced Romain Girouille in the first round, beating the French archer by 112–110. In the second round Kim was eliminated as Jacek Proć won the confrontation with 111–110. Together with Matthew Gray and Michael Naray he also took part in the team event. With his 665 score from the ranking round combined with the 654 of Gray and the 658 of Naray the Australians were in 9th position after the ranking round. In the first round they were defeated by eight seed Poland (223–218). The Polish would not come further than the quarter final. In 2008, he represented Australia at the 2008 Summer Olympics in archery. He was viewed as Australia's best medal chance in archery going into the Games. He competed in both the team and individual event. Going into the knock out stage in the team competition, Australia was ranked ninth. In one of the early rounds of the 2008 Games, he beat Romain Giroullie of France with a score of 112–110. In September 2011, he was named to the Australian archery shadow Olympic team. In March at the 2012 Olympic Games Nomination Shoot Results, he finished first with a score of 2669.
