= Maged Youssef =

Egyptian archer (born 1978)

Maged Youssef (born 7 January 1978) is a sportsman from Egypt. He competes in archery.

Youssef competed at the 2004 Summer Olympics in men's individual archery. He was defeated by Dmytro Hrachov (UKR) in the first round of elimination, placing 58th overall.

== 2008 Summer Olympics ==
At the 2008 Summer Olympics in Beijing Youssef finished his ranking round with a total of 605 points. This gave him the 62nd seed for the final competition bracket in which he faced Viktor Ruban in the first round. Ruban won 111-96 and went on to win the gold medal in the tournament.
