= Florian Floto =

German archer (born 1988)

Personal information
- National team: 2016
- Born: 12 April 1988 (age 38) Braunschweig, West Germany
- Height: 1.88 m (6 ft 2 in)
- Weight: 92 kg (203 lb)

Sport
- Country: Germany
- Sport: Archery
- Rank: 194 at World Archery Rankings (March 2016)
- Event: Recurve
Medal record
Men's recurve archery
Representing Germany
World Indoor Championships
| Gold medal – first place | 2016 Ankara | Team |
European Outdoor Championships
| Gold medal – first place | 2010 Rovereto | Team |
European Indoor Championships
| Silver medal – second place | 2008 Turin | Team |
- Updated on 30 July 2016

Florian Floto (born 12 April 1988) is a German recurve archer. He is part of the German national team.

He has competed internationally since the 2008 European Indoor Championships in Turin. There, he finished in 6th place individually and won the silver medal with the German team. In 2010, Floto won Gold with the German team at the European Championships in Rovereto, in the individual competition he finished in fourth place.

He won the gold medal at the 2016 World Indoor Archery Championships in the men's team event and represented Germany at the 2016 Summer Olympics in Rio de Janeiro where he finished in 9th place. In Rio, Floto lost 4–6 in the round of 16 against eventual gold medalist Ku Bon-chan.

Floto represents the Braunschweig-based Schützenverein Querum in domestic competitions, and has won several German championship titles with the club, both in individual and team events. He is an electrician by profession.
