= Martin Bulíř =

Czech archer (born 1969)

Martin Bulíř (born 8 April 1969 in Liberec) is an athlete from the Czech Republic, who competes in archery.

== 2008 Summer Olympics ==
At the 2008 Summer Olympics in Beijing Bulíř finished his ranking round with a total of 629 points, which gave him the 56th seed for the final competition bracket in which he faced Ilario Di Buò in the first round. Di Buò won the match by 111-100 and Bulíř was eliminated. Di Buò would lose in the next round against Vic Wunderle.
