= Michael Naray =

Australian archer (born 1970)

Personal information
- Nationality: Australian
- Born: 23 February 1970 (age 56)

Sport
- Country: Australia
- Sport: Archery

Michael Naray (born 23 February 1970 in Sydney, Australia) is an Olympic competitor for archery representing Australia. He was an Australian Institute of Sport scholarship holder.

At the 2008 Summer Olympics in Beijing, Naray finished his ranking round with a total of 658 points. This gave him the 30th seed for the final competition bracket, in which he faced Jean-Charles Valladont in the first round, beating the French archer 108–106. In the second round, Naray eliminated Viktor Ruban (115–105), and eventually won the gold medal.

Together with Sky Kim and Matthew Gray he also took part in the team event. With his 658 score from the ranking round combined with the 666 of Kim and the 654 of Gray, the Australians were in 9th position after the ranking round. In the first round they defeated eight seed Poland (223–218, the Poles had set the Olympic record with their 223 score). The Polish would not go on to progress further than the quarter-finals.

He later went on to become a physics teacher at a Sydney high school, teaching year 11 physics and also the ISTEM elective subject to year 9.

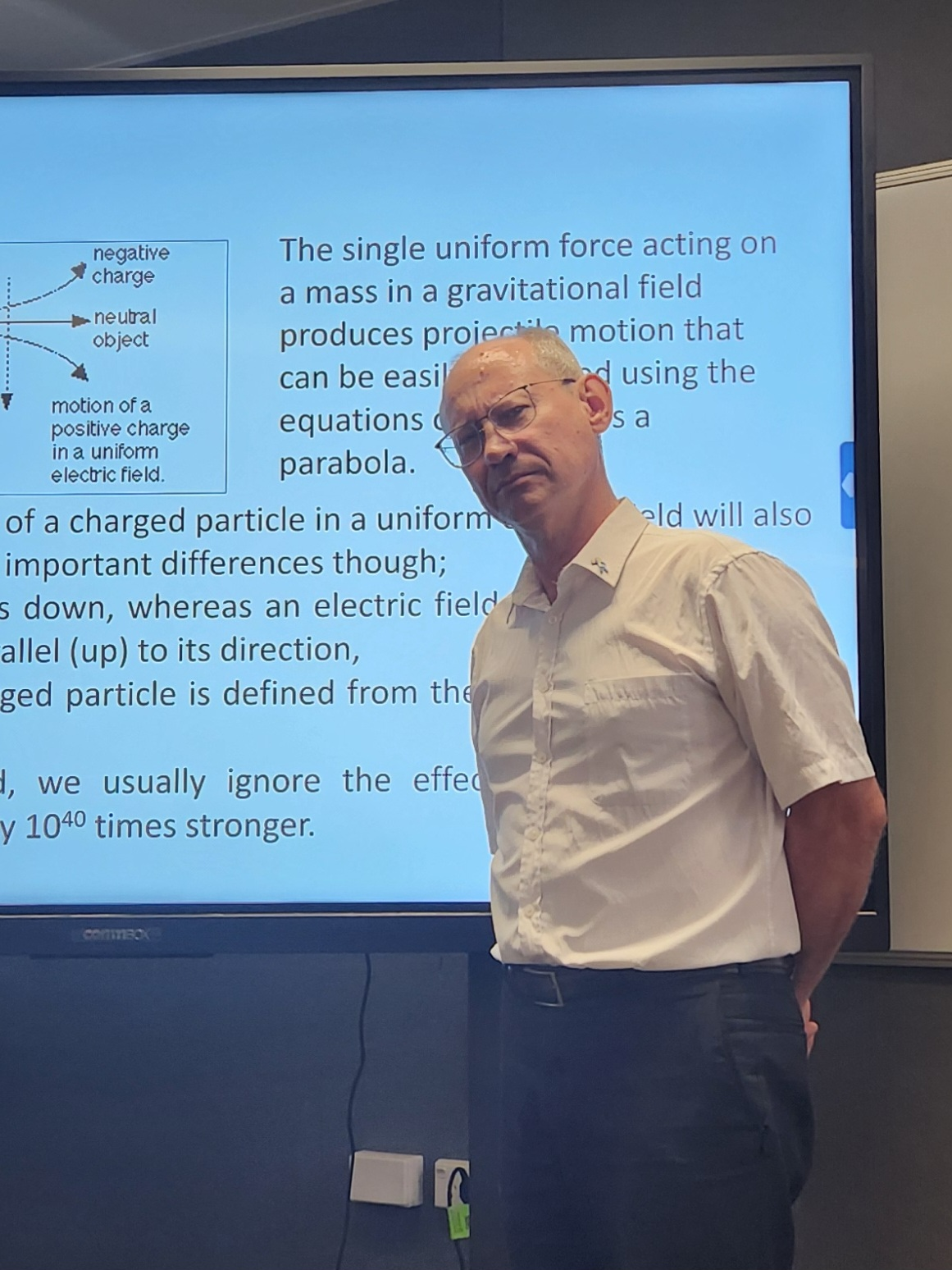
Micheal Naray teaching at a Sydney high school
