= Xing Yu (archer) =

Chinese archer (born 1991)

Medal record

Men's recurve archery

Representing China

Asian Championships
Silver medal – second place	2009 Denpasar	Individual

Xing Yu (Chinese: 邢宇; born 12 March 1991, in Beijing, China) is a Chinese archer. At the 2012 and 2016 Summer Olympics he competed for his country in the Men's individual and team events. At the 2012 Summer Olympics, he finished reached the second round of the men's individual, where he lost to Khairul Anuar Mohamad. In the team event, the Chinese men's team finished in 7th, losing to Italy in the quarter-finals. At the 2016 Olympics, he lost in the first round to Riau Ega Agatha. The men's team finished in 4th, losing the bronze medal match to Australia.
