= Elías Cuesta =

Spanish archer (born 1985)

Medal record

Men's archery

Representing Spain

Mediterranean Games
Silver medal – second place	2013 Mersin	Team

Elías Cuesta Cobo (born 15 March 1985) is a Spanish archer. He competed in the individual event at the 2012 Summer Olympics. He is currently the coach of the Spanish national team.

He is the brother of Irene Cuesta, a Spanish national archery champion and the coach of the Spanish archery team at the 2012 Summer Paralympics.
