= Wan Khalmizam =

Malaysian archer (born 1986)

Personal information
- Nationality: Malaysian
- Born: Wan Mohd Khalmizam bin Wan Abdul Aziz; 21 August 1986 (age 39) Tanah Merah, Kelantan, Malaysia
- Height: 1.68 m (5 ft 6 in)
- Weight: 74 kg (163 lb)

Sport
- Country: Malaysia
- Sport: Archery
- Coached by: Lee Jae Hyung

Achievements and titles
- Olympic finals: 2008 London
Medal record
Men's recurve archery
Representing Malaysia
Asian Championships
| Silver medal – second place | 2007 Xi'an | Team |

Wan Mohd Khalmizam bin Wan Abdul Aziz (born 21 August 1986 in Tanah Merah, Kelantan) is an athlete from Malaysia, who competes in archery.

== 2008 Summer Olympics ==
At the 2008 Summer Olympics in Beijing Khalmizam finished his ranking round with a total of 674 points, five points behind leader Juan René Serrano. This gave him the fifth seed for the final competition bracket in which he faced Alexandru Bodnar in the first round. The Romanian surprised Khalmizam with a 106 score while he only came to a total of 105 points and he was eliminated. Bodnar would lose in the following round against Juan Carlos Stevens.

Together with Cheng Chu Sian and Muhammad Marbawi he also took part in the team event. With the 674 score from the ranking round combined with the 660 of Cheng and the 659 of Marbawi Malaysia were in third position after the ranking round, which gave them a straight seed into the quarter-finals. With 218-213 they were however eliminated by the Italian team that eventually won the silver medal.
