= Ryuichi Moriya =

Japanese archer (born 1985)

Ryuichi Moriya (守屋 龍一, Moriya Ryūichi) (born February 28, 1985, in Kishiwada, Osaka) is an athlete from Japan, who competes in archery.

== 2008 Summer Olympics ==
At the 2008 Summer Olympics in Beijing Moriya finished his ranking round with a total of 661 points, which gave him the 22nd seed for the final competition bracket in which he faced Piotr Piątek in the first round. Both archers scored 109 points in the regular match, but with 10 points in the extra round against 9 from Piątek, Moriya advanced to the second round. Moriya reached the quarter-final by beating Wang Cheng-Pang (114-109) and Balzhinima Tsyrempilov (113-110). In the quarter-final Viktor Ruban was too strong with 115-106. Ruban would go on and win the gold medal in the tournament.

Moriya won the individual men's recurve (Olympic bow) Silver Medal in the 2005 World Archery Championship in Madrid, Spain.
