= Jens Pieper =

German archer (born 1968)

Jens Pieper (born February 9, 1968, in Braunschweig) is an athlete from Germany, who competes in archery.

== 2008 Summer Olympics ==
At the 2008 Summer Olympics in Beijing Pieper finished his ranking round with a total of 648 points, which gave him the 45th seed for the final competition bracket in which he faced Oleksandr Serdyuk in the first round. Serdyuk won the match by 107-105 and Pieper was eliminated. Serdyuk would lose in the next round against Rafał Dobrowolski.
