= Marbawi Sulaiman =

Malaysian archer (born 1983)

Medal record

Men's recurve archery

Representing Malaysia

Asian Championships
Silver medal – second place	2007 Xi'an	Team

Muhammad Marbawi Sulaiman (born 30 January 1983 in Pengkalan Hulu) is an athlete from Malaysia, who competes in archery.

== 2008 Summer Olympics ==
At the 2008 Summer Olympics in Beijing Marbawi finished his ranking round with a total of 659 points. This gave him the 27th seed for the final competition bracket in which he faced Chen Szu-Yuan in the first round. Although Chen was only the 38th seed he managed to beat Marbawi with 107–106.

Together with Wan Khalmizam and Cheng Chu Sian he also took part in the team event. With the 659 score from the ranking round combined with the 675 of Khalmizam and the 660 of Cheng Malaysia were in third position after the ranking round, which gave them a straight seed into the quarter finals. With 218-213 they were however eliminated by the Italian team that eventually won the silver medal.
