= Juan René Serrano =

Mexican archer (born 1984)

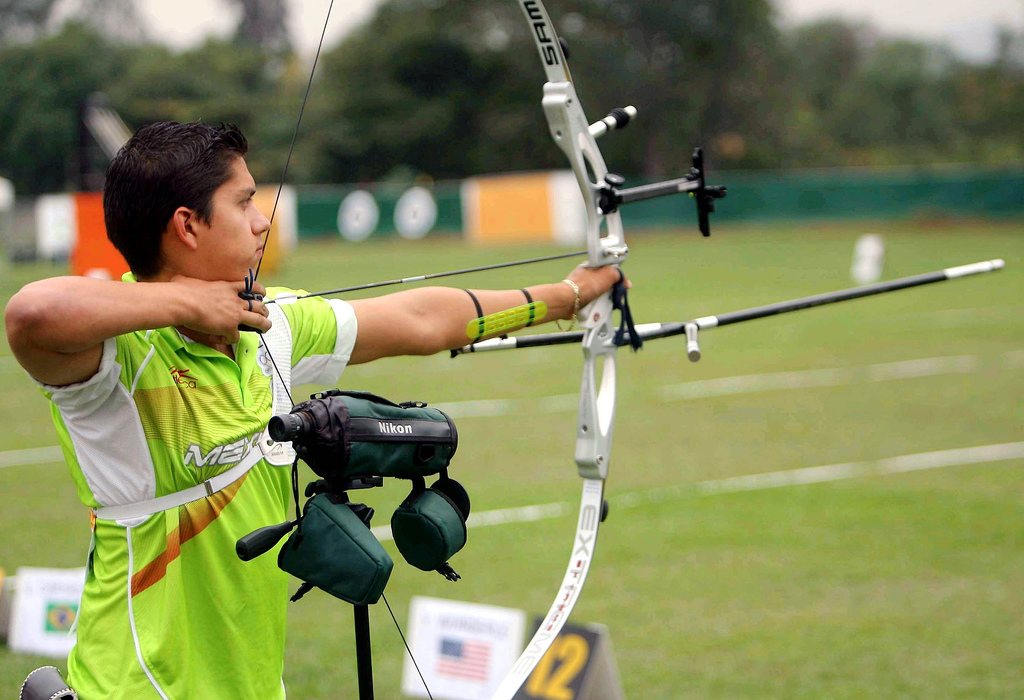
- Serrano in 2007

Personal information
- Born: 23 February 1984 (age 42) Guadalajara, Mexico

Sport
- Sport: Archery
Medal record
Men's Archery
Representing Mexico
World Championships
Silver medal – second place	2011 Turin	Mixed team
World Cup
Gold medal – first place	2013 Medellín	Team
Gold medal – first place	2014 Wrocław	Team
Gold medal – first place	2015 Wrocław	Mixed team
Silver medal – second place	2006 San Salvador	Team
Silver medal – second place	2007 Dubai	Individual
Silver medal – second place	2013 Antalya	Individual
Silver medal – second place	2014 Shanghai	Mixed team
Silver medal – second place	2016 Medellín	Team
Silver medal – second place	2016 Antalya	Team
Bronze medal – third place	2009 Shanghai	Team
Bronze medal – third place	2013 Antalya	Mixed team
Bronze medal – third place	2013 Wrocław	Team
Bronze medal – third place	2015 Shanghai	Mixed team
Pan American Games
Gold medal – first place	2015 Toronto	Team
Silver medal – second place	2011 Guadalajara	Team
Bronze medal – third place	2007 Rio de Janeiro	Team

Juan René Serrano Gutiérrez (born 23 February 1984) is a Mexican archer.

Serrano competed at the 2004 Summer Olympics in men's individual archery. He won his first match, advancing to the round of 32. In the second round of elimination, he was defeated. His final rank was 20th overall. Serrano was also a member of the 12th-place Mexican men's archery team at the 2004 Summer Olympics.

Rene Serrano won 3rd place at the Archery World Cup in Turkey – Antalya 2007.

Rene Serrano Won 2nd place overall in the 2007 Archery World Cup Final held in Dubai, United Arab Emirates. He defeated Alan Wills in the semi-finals but lost to Baljinima Tsyrempilov in the finals.

== 2008 Summer Olympics ==
At the 2008 Summer Olympics in Beijing, Serrano finished his ranking round with a total of 679 points, the highest score, one point in front of Mangal Singh Champia and Viktor Ruban. This gave him the first seed for the final competition bracket in which he faced Joseph Muaausa in the first round, beating the Samoan 116–88. In the second round Serrano was too strong for Daniel Morillo (112–111) and via Maksim Kunda (110–106) in the third round he advanced to the quarter-finals. There he had no problem beating Vic Wunderle 113–106. In the semi-final he came into trouble and was unable to win his match against South Korean Park Kyung-Mo (112–115). In the bronze medal match he was not capable to recover from his defeat and Bair Badënov took the medal with 115–110.

== 2011 Pan American Games ==
Serrano was named the flag bearer for the Mexico at the 2011 Pan American Games.

== Individual performance timeline ==
Tournament	2004	2005	2006	2007	2008	2009	2010	2011	2012	2013	2014	SR
World Archery tournaments
Olympic Games	2R				4th				2R			0/3
World Championships		1R		1R		4R		4R		3R		0/5
World Cup												
Stage 1			2R	1R	QF	QF	2R	3R		3R	QF	0/8
Stage 2			2R	1R	2R		2R	2R	2R	2nd	3R	0/8
Stage 3			3R	3rd	1R	2R		2R	4R	3R	1R	0/8
Stage 4			1R	4th	1R	2R		3R		3R	2R	0/7
World Cup Final			DNQ	2nd	DNQ	DNQ	DNQ	DNQ	DNQ	DNQ	DNQ	0/1
End of year world ranking	37	44	44	8	11	15	30	26	36	16		
