= Simon Terry =

British archer (1974–2021)

Medal record

Men's archery

Olympic Games
| Bronze medal – third place | 1992 Barcelona | Individual |
| Bronze medal – third place | 1992 Barcelona | Team |

World Cup Final
| Silver medal – second place | 2009 Copenhagen | Individual |
| Silver medal – second place | 2010 Edinburgh | Mixed team |

Simon Duncan Terry (27 March 1974 – 19 July 2021) was a British archer from Grantham in Lincolnshire, England.

== Early life ==
Terry was born on 27 March 1974 in Stirling, the son of Mike and Janice Terry. With the help of his father, Terry first began practising archery when he was eight years old. At the age of nine he won his first competition. At the time of the 1992 Summer Olympics, Terry was an unemployed roofer.

== 1992 Summer Olympics ==
Having started archery at the age of eight, Simon made his Games debut in 1992 aged 18, where he became the first British man to collect an individual medal at the Olympics since its reintroduction in 1988 by taking third place. A second medal, a bronze in the men's team event, followed at the same Games. He retired from the sport for the first time shortly afterwards.

== Comeback ==
After 13 years of retirement from archery, Terry began shooting again in the year it was announced that London would host the 2012 Summer Olympics, and soon achieved high placings in major international events including the team gold at the World Cup 2007, stage two, in Varese, and an individual fourth place at the World Outdoor Championships in Leipzig, Germany being beaten by his teammate Alan Wills in a thrilling tie break where he scored a nine, and Wills took the bronze with a 10. Another one of his successes was at the fourth stage of the 2007 World Cup in Dover, England, when he was victorious against the young Mexican archer, Juan René Serrano. Serrano scored an eight in the tie and Terry scored a nine.

His success saw Terry selected for the 2008 Summer Olympics, four years ahead of his original schedule, and 16 years after his double medal-winning debut.

== 2008 Summer Olympics ==
At the 2008 Summer Olympics in Beijing Terry finished his ranking round with a total of 670 points, nine points behind leader Juan René Serrano. This gave him the seventh seed for the final competition bracket in which he faced Matti Hatava in the first round. Hatava was only the 58th seed, but managed to beat Terry with 105–104. Together with Wills and Larry Godfrey he also took part in the team event. With his 670 score from the ranking round combined with the 661 of Wills and the 657 of Godfrey the British were in fifth position after the ranking round. In the first elimination round they faced the Chinese team and got eliminated with 214–210.

The Chinese went on to win the bronze medal.

== 2012 Summer Olympics ==
Gaining selection for his home Games at the age of 38, at the 2012 Summer Olympics Terry reached the last 32, losing to Dan Olaru. In the team event, Great Britain lost to Ukraine in the last 16. His third Olympic Games would also prove to be his final international event, as he retired for the second time.

== Personal ==
Terry died in July 2021 at his home at the age of 47. He had been fighting an aggressive form of cancer. He was survived by his wife, the former international archer Emma Terry.

As of 2024 he remains the only British male archer to win an individual Olympic archery medal since its reintroduction as an Olympic sport in 1972.
