= Romain Girouille =

French archer (born 1988)

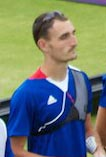
Romain Girouille

Romain Girouille (born 26 April 1988 in Saint-Doulchard) is a French archer.

== Career ==
=== 2008 Summer Olympics ===
At the 2008 Summer Olympics in Beijing Girouille finished his ranking round with a total of 641 points, which gave him the 51st seed for the final competition bracket in which he faced Sky Kim in the first round. Kim won the match by 112–110 and Girouille was eliminated. Kim would lose in the next round against Jacek Proć.

On 5 April 2009 Girouille defeated Canadian Crispin Duenas in the final of the first round of the 2009 World Cup by a score of 112–107. He qualified for the final, and finished third.

=== 2012 Summer Olympics ===
At the 2012 Summer Olympics, Girouille competed in both the men's individual and men's team events. In the individual event, he finished in 9th after the ranking round, before losing to Nay Myo Aung in the first knockout round. The French team made it to the quarterfinals of the team event.

=== Post-olympics ===
In 2021 he became co-president of the French National Olympic and Sports Committee's Athletes' Commission alongside Astrid Guyart, an Olympic fencer.
