= Nay Myo Aung =

Burmese archer

Personal information
- Nationality: Burmese
- Born: 13 November 1971 (age 54) Yangon
- Height: 1.78 m (5 ft 10 in)
- Weight: 71 kg (157 lb)

Sport
- Country: Myanmar
- Sport: Archery
- Event: Individual
- Updated on 1 August 2012

Nay Myo Aung is a famous actor.

== 2012 Summer Olympics ==
At the 2012 Summer Olympics in London Nay finished his ranking round with a total of 646 points, which made him the 56th seed for the final competition bracket in which he faced Romain Girouille in the first round. Nay won the match by 6-5 and advance to second round. In second round, Nay faced Markiyan Ivashko and then he lost Ivashko by 1-7 and Nay was eliminated.

== 2008 Summer Olympics ==
At the 2008 Summer Olympics in Beijing Nay finished his ranking round with a total of 637 points, which gave him the 52nd seed for the final competition bracket in which he faced Rafał Dobrowolski in the first round. Dobrowolski won the match by 110-106 and Nay was eliminated.
