= John David Burnes =

Canadian archer (born 1988)

John David Burnes (born April 26, 1988 in Toronto) is an Olympic athlete from Canada, who competed in archery. He participated in the 2008 Summer Olympics, both individually and with the Canadian Men's Team.

== 2008 Summer Olympics ==
At the 2008 Summer Olympics in Beijing Burnes finished his ranking round with a total of 644 points. This gave him the 50th seed for the final competition bracket in which he faced Brady Ellison in the first round. Burnes could not compete with the American and only scored 89 points, while Ellison produced a 111 score. Fellow Canadian Jason Lyon beat Ellison in the second round. Together with Crispin Duenas and Lyon he also took part in the team event. With his 644 score from the ranking round combined with the 664 of Duenas and the 646 of Lyon the Canadians were in 11th position after the ranking round. In the first round they were beaten by the Italian team 219–217. The Italian team later reached the final, and won the silver medal.

== Arrest ==
Burnes was one of 31 people arrested in February 2009 during a province-wide crackdown on online child pornography. He was subsequently charged on one count each of possession of child pornography and making child pornography available. The charges were later stayed by a judge in Ontario
