= Nuno Pombo =

Portuguese archer (born 1978)

Nuno Pombo (born 20 April 1978) is a Portuguese athlete who competes in archery.

== 2008 Summer Olympics ==
At the 2008 Summer Olympics in Beijing Pombo finished his ranking round with a total of 650 points, which gave him the 42nd seed for the final competition bracket in which he faced Yusuf Ergin in the first round. With 106-103 Ergin was the winner of the confrontation and Pombo was eliminated. Ergin would lose in the following round against Lee Chang-Hwan.
