= Mark Javier =

Filipino archer

Personal information
- Full name: Mark Pinili Javier
- Born: Dumaguete, Philippines
- Height: 5 ft 11 in (180 cm)
- Weight: 110 lb (50 kg)

Sport
- Country: Philippines
- Sport: Archery

Mark Pinili Javier is a professional archer from the Philippines. He competed in Archery at the 2006 Asian Games in Doha, Qatar but was defeated by the Korean Im Dong Hyun 113–104 in the 1/16 Elimination Round. During the 2006 Asian Games he landed 9th place in the individual category.

An alumnus of Silliman University with a Bachelor of Science in Information Technology degree, Mark Javier was also a member of the Silliman University Dumaguete Archery Club (SUDAC) and the National Archery Association of the Philippines (NAAP). He won medals in local and national competitions as well as joined international competitions.

== 2008 Summer Olympics ==
At the 2008 Summer Olympics in Beijing Javier finished his ranking round with a total of 654 points. This gave him the 36th seed for the final competition bracket in which he faced Kuo Cheng Wei in the first round. Kuo won the match with 106-102 and advanced to the next round in which he was beaten by Park Kyung-Mo.

== 2012 Summer Olympics ==
At the 2012 Summer Olympics, Javier qualified for the last 32, where he was knocked out by Brady Ellison.
