= Mangal Singh Champia =

Indian archer (born 1983)

Medal record

Men's recurve archery

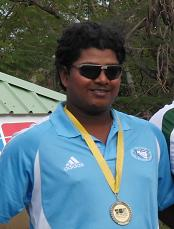
Representing India

Asian Games
Bronze medal – third place	2006 Doha	Team
Bronze medal – third place	2010 Guangzhou	Team

Asian Championships
Gold medal – first place	2007 Xi'an	Team
Silver medal – second place	2009 Denpasar	Team
Bronze medal – third place	2007 Xi'an	Individual

Archery World Cup
Silver medal – second place	2015 Wroclaw	Mixed Team
Gold medal – first place	2010 Antalaya	Team
Silver medal – second place	2010 Porec	Team
Silver medal – second place	2009 Antalaya	Team
Gold medal – first place	2009 Croatia	Team
Gold medal – first place	2009 Santo Domingo	Team
Gold medal – first place	2008 Antalaya	Team
Bronze medal – third place	2008 Croatia	Team

Mangal Singh Champia (born 9 November 1983) is an Indian archer, who won multiple medals in several international events, including the 2006 Asian Games. He was conferred with the Arjuna award by the President of India for the year 2009.

Mangal started archery in the year 1995 and became pro in 2008.

He has secured 2016 Rio Olympics berth.

== Other achievements ==
(gold) 15th Asian Archery Championships, China: Men's Team Event

(gold) 3rd Asian Grand Prix, Iran

(silver) 2nd Commonwealth Archery Championships, India

(silver) 3rd Asian Archery Grand Prix Tournament, Indonesia

(bronze) 2010 Asian Games: Men's Team Event

(bronze) 15th Asian Archery Championships, China: Individual Event

== 2008 Summer Olympics ==
At the 2008 Summer Olympics in Beijing Champia finished his ranking round with a total of 678 points, just one point behind Juan René Serrano and equal with Viktor Ruban and scoring more bull's eyes than Serrano. This gave him the second seed for the final competition bracket in which he faced Hojjatollah Vaezi in the first round, beating the Iranian 112–98. In the second round Champia faced 31st seed Bair Badënov, but was unable to beat the Russian who won with 109–108. Badënov went on to win the bronze medal.

== See also ==
- Indian Squad for 2008 Olympics
