= Niels Dall =

Danish archer (born 1984)

Niels Dall (born 3 October 1984 in Vejle) is an athlete from Denmark, who competes in archery.

== 2008 Summer Olympics ==
At the 2008 Summer Olympics in Beijing Dall finished his ranking round with a total of 634 points, which gave him the 53rd seed for the final competition bracket in which he faced defending Olympic Champion Marco Galiazzo in the first round. Galiazzo won the match by 114-97 and Dall was eliminated. Galiazzo would lose in the next round against Alan Wills.

Currently, he is one of the best Breakout players in the world, having already reached level 8 with a reduced paddle.
