= Magnus Petersson =

Swedish archer (born 1975)

Medal record

Men's archery

Representing Sweden

Olympic Games
Silver medal – second place	1996 Atlanta	Individual

Magnus Petersson (born 17 June 1975 in Gothenburg) is an archer from Sweden.

He is an experienced Olympian, having won a silver medal in 1996. Petersson advanced to the semifinals in archery at the 2000 Summer Olympics, but was defeated there by Vic Wunderle. In the consolation bronze medal match, he again lost, this time to Wietse van Alten. The Swedish team, of which he was a member, placed 6th.

Petersson competed at the 2004 Summer Olympics in men's individual archery. He won his first match, advancing to the round of 32. In the second round of elimination, he was defeated. His final rank was 23rd overall. Petersson was also a member of the 9th-place Swedish men's archery team.

He won the World Indoor Championships in 1995 and 1999, and became the first male archer to win this tournament twice.

== 2008 Summer Olympics ==
At the 2008 Summer Olympics in Beijing Petersson finished his ranking round with a total of 646 points. This gave him the 49th seed for the final competition bracket in which he faced Crispin Duenas in the first round. Both archers scored 108 points and the match had to be decided by an extra round in which Petersson scored 19 points and Duenas 18. In the next round Maksim Kunda was too strong and advanced to the third round with 112-110.
