= Yusuf Göktuğ Ergin =

Turkish archer (born 1984)

Yusuf Göktuğ Ergin (born 12 September 1984) is an athlete from Turkey, who competes in archery.

== 2008 Summer Olympics ==
At the 2008 Summer Olympics in Beijing, Ergin finished his ranking round with a total of 660 points, which gave him the 23rd seed for the final competition bracket in which he faced Nuno Pombo in the first round, in which he beat the archer from Portugal 106–103. In the second round, Ergin was not able to win against 10th seed Lee Chang-hwan who shot a new Olympic Record of 117 points. Ergin still managed to hit 109 points, but was eliminated.
