= Calvin Hartley =

South African archer (born 1988)

Calvin Hartley (born 15 April 1988) is an athlete from South Africa, who competes in archery.

== 2008 Summer Olympics ==
At the 2008 Summer Olympics in Beijing Hartley finished his ranking round with a total of 654 points, which gave him the 37th seed for the final competition bracket in which he faced Juan Carlos Stevens in the first round. Both archers scored 107 points in the regular match and had to make the difference in the extra round. There Hartley scored 18 points, while Stevens advanced to the next round with 19 points. Stevens would eventually reach the quarter-final.
