= Piotr Piątek =

Polish archer (born 1982)

Piotr Piątek (born 17 February 1982 in Żywiec) is an athlete from Poland, who competes in archery.

== 2008 Summer Olympics ==
At the 2008 Summer Olympics in Beijing Piątek finished his ranking round with a total of 649 points, which gave him the 43rd seed for the final competition bracket in which he faced Ryuichi Moriya in the first round. Both archers scored 109 points in the regular match, but Moriya 10 points in the extra round and Piątek only 9. Moriya would lose in the quarter finals against Viktor Ruban who won the Olympic gold medal.

Together with Rafał Dobrowolski and Jacek Proć he also took part in the team event. With his 649 score from the ranking round combined with the 667 of Dobrowolski and the 661 of Proć the Polish were in eighth position after the ranking round. In the first round they were too strong for the Australian team, but they were not capable enough to beat South Korea in the quarter finals.
