= Matti Hatava =

Finnish archer

Personal information
- Born: 10 March 1981 (age 45) Lappeenranta, Finland
- Height: 177 cm (5 ft 10 in)
- Weight: 80 kg (180 lb)

Sport
- Country: Finland
- Club: Tampereen Jousiampujat

Achievements and titles
- Highest world ranking: 340
- Updated on 13 August 2008

Matti Hatava (born 10 March 1981, Lappeenranta) is a Finnish archer who lives in Tampere and represents archery club Tampereen Jousiampujat.

Hatava came 8th in the 1998 World Junior Championships, and represented Finland in the European Championships in 2000 and 2002. In 2002 Hatava took a break from active sport to pursue his personal career in banking. He returned to archery in the summer of 2007, coming third in the 2007 Finnish Championships.

In 2008 Hatava finished second in the final Olympic qualification tournament held in Boé, France. Thus Hatava guaranteed a place for Finland at the 2008 Olympic Games in Beijing. He made his olympic debut finishing 58th on ranking round. In elimination rounds he first won Simon Terry of Great Britain but then lost to Cheng Chu Sian of Malaysia.

== Personal records ==
- FITA 144 arrows: 1322
- 72 arrows, 70 metres: 660
- 12 arrows final: 111
