= Maksim Kunda =

Belarusian archer (born 1989)

Maksim Kunda (born August 1, 1989) is an athlete from Belarus, who competes in archery.

== 2008 Summer Olympics ==
At the 2008 Summer Olympics in Beijing Kunda finished his ranking round with a total of 646 points, which gave him the 48th seed for the final competition bracket in which he faced Takaharu Furukawa in the first round. Both archers scored 111 points and in the extra round Kunda eliminated the Japanese 19–18. In the second round he won the match 112–110 against Magnus Petersson and he faced Juan René Serrano in the third round. Serrano was the winner of the ranking round and thus the first seed. With 110–106 Serrano would advance to the quarter-final.
