= Rafał Dobrowolski =

Polish archer (born 1983)

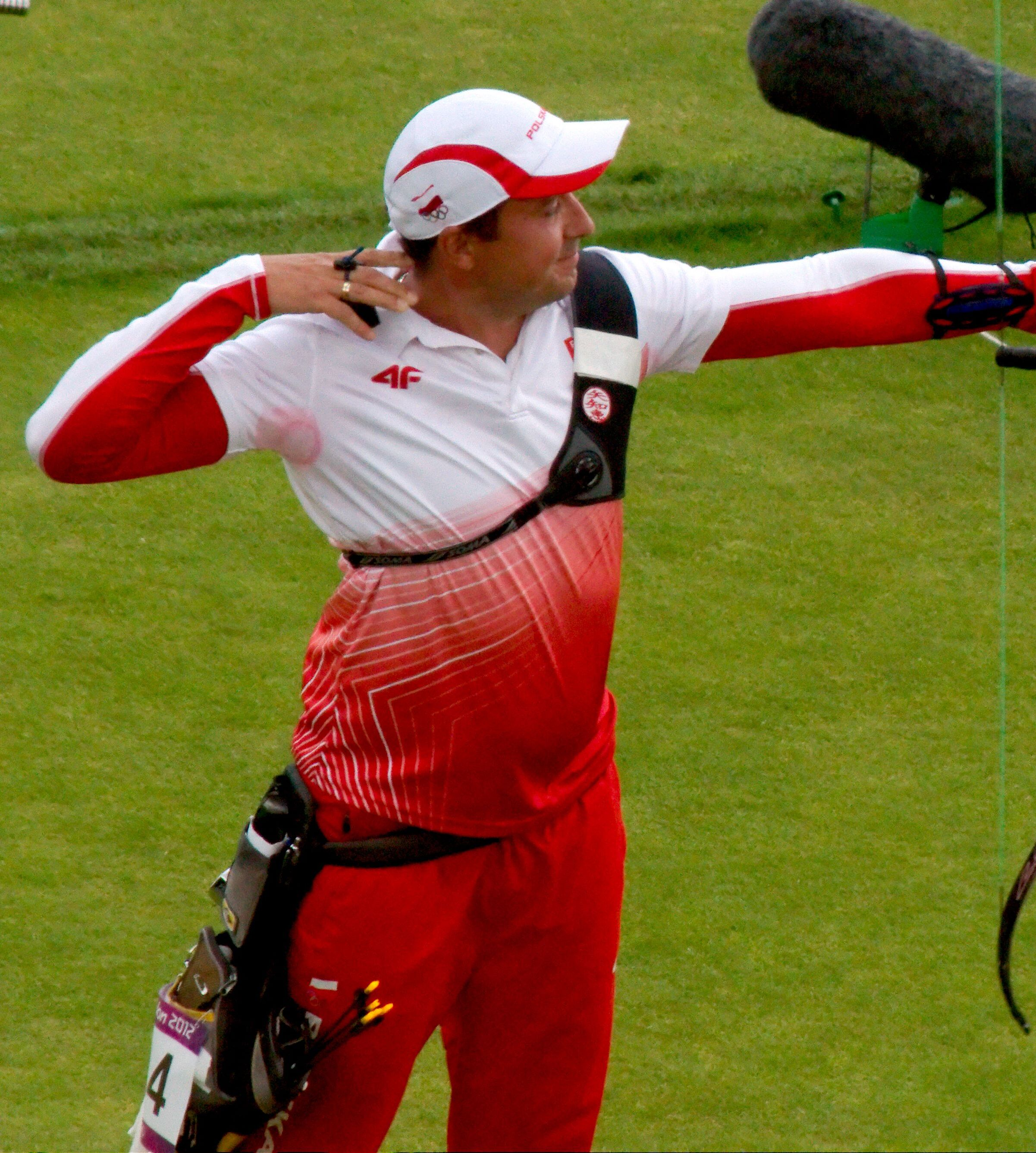
- Dobrowolski in 2012

Personal information
- National team: Poland
- Born: 27 December 1983 (age 42) Kielce, Poland

Sport
- Sport: Archery
Medal record
Men's recurve archery
Representing Poland
European Indoor Championships
Silver medal – second place	2025 Samsun	Team
Universiade
Bronze medal – third place	2009 Belgrade	Mixed team

Rafał Dobrowolski (born 27 December 1983 in Kielce) is an athlete from Poland, who competes in archery.

== 2008 Summer Olympics ==
At the 2008 Summer Olympics in Beijing Dobrowolski finished his ranking round with a total of 667 points, which gave him the 13th seed for the final competition bracket in which he faced Nay Myo Aung in the first round, in which he beat the archer from Myanmar 110-106. In the second round Dobrowolski was too strong for Oleksandr Serdyuk. After a 111-111 draw Dobrowolski scored 9 points in the extra round, with Serdyuk scoring eight. In the third round he was unable to beat Park Kyung-Mo (113-105) and was eliminated.

Together with Piotr Piątek and Jacek Proć he also took part in the team event. With his 667 score from the ranking round combined with the 649 of Piątek and the 661 of Proć the Polish were in eighth position after the ranking round. In the first round they were too strong for the Australian team, but they were not capable enough to beat South Korea in the quarter-finals.
