= Jacek Proć =

Polish archer (born 1981)

Jacek Proć (born 9 September 1981 in Legnica) is an archer from Poland.

Proć competed at the 2004 Summer Olympics in men's individual archery. He was defeated in the first round of elimination by Yavor Hristov and placed 55th overall.

== 2008 Summer Olympics ==
At the 2008 Summer Olympics in Beijing Proć finished his ranking round with a total of 661 points. This gave him the 19th seed for the final competition bracket in which he faced Li Wenquan in the first round, beating the Chinese 116-111. In the second round Proć won by only one point difference (111-110) against Sky Kim and faced Viktor Ruban in the third round. With 114-108 Ruban was too strong and he eventually became the Olympic Champion.

Together with Piotr Piątek and Rafał Dobrowolski he also took part in the team event. With his 661 score from the ranking round combined with the 649 of Piątek and the 667 of Dobrowolski the Polish were in eighth position after the ranking round. In the first round they were too strong for the Australian team, but they were not capable enough to beat South Korea in the quarter-finals.
