= Alexandru Bodnar =

Romanian archer (born 1990)

Personal information
- Nationality: Romanian
- Born: 28 June 1990 (age 35) Rădăuţi, Romania

Sport
- Sport: Archery

Alexandru Bodnar (born 28 June 1990 in Rădăuţi) is an athlete from Romania, who competes in archery.

== 2008 Summer Olympics ==
At the 2008 Summer Olympics in Beijing Bodnar finished his ranking round with a total of 614 points, which gave him the 60th seed for the final competition bracket in which he faced Wan Khalmizam in the first round. Bodnar won the match by 106-105 and qualified for the second round. Here Juan Carlos Stevens was too strong with 108-101.
