= Cheng Chu Sian =

Malaysian archer (born 1986)

Medal record

Men's recurve archery

Representing Malaysia

Asian Championships
Gold medal – first place	2011 Tehran	Team
Silver medal – second place	2007 Xi'an	Team

Cheng Chu Sian (simplified Chinese: 钟础先; traditional Chinese: 鍾礎先; pinyin: Zhōng Chǔxiān; Jyutping: Zung1 Co2 Sin1; Pe̍h-ōe-jī: Cheng Chhó͘-sian; born 1 March 1986 in Kuala Lumpur) is an athlete from Malaysia, who competes in archery.

== 2008 Summer Olympics ==
At the 2008 Summer Olympics in Beijing Cheng finished his ranking round with a total of 660 points. This gave him the 26th seed for the final competition bracket in which he faced Matthew Gray of Australia in the first round, 109–101. With a win over Matti Hatava of Finland (110–103) he qualified for the third round and there he faced Lee Chang-Hwan of South Korea. Both archers scored 105 points in the regular match and had to go to an extra round. Here Cheng advanced with 19 points, while Lee hit 18 points. In the quarter finals Cheng was unable to beat Bair Badënov of Russia (109–104). Badënov went on to win the bronze medal.

Together with Wan Khalmizam and Muhammad Marbawi he also took part in the team event. With the 660 score from the ranking round combined with the 675 of Khalmizam and the 659 of Marbawi, Malaysia were in third position after the ranking round, which gave them a straight seed into the quarter finals. With 218-213 they were however eliminated by the Italian team that eventually won the silver medal.

== 2012 Summer Olympics ==
Cheng was less successful at the 2012 Summer Olympics, being knocked out by teammate Khairul Anuar Mohamad in the first knockout round. The Malaysian team also lost in the first round, to Mexico.

== Personal life ==
Cheng graduated from Universiti Putra Malaysia with a Bachelor of Communication in 2014.
