= Matthew Gray (archer) =

Australian archer (born 1973)

Personal information
- Full name: Matthew Gray
- Nationality: Australian
- Born: 24 June 1973 (age 53) Yea, Victoria
- Height: 189 cm (6 ft 2 in)
- Weight: 86 kg (190 lb)

Sport
- Country: Australia
- Sport: Archery
- Club: Sydney Olympic Park Archers
- Now coaching: Ki Sik Lee (1998-2000); Kathleen Gray (2000-present)
Medal record
Archery
Representing Australia
Commonwealth Games
| Gold medal – first place | 2010 Delhi | Men's Team |
World Field Championships
| Bronze medal – third place | 1988 Italy | junior men's recurve |
World Field Championships
| Bronze medal – third place | 1994 France | men's recurve |
World Field Championships
| Gold medal – first place | 1992 Netherlands | Men's team recurve |
European Grand Prix
| Gold medal – first place | 1998 Czech Republic | Men's team recurve |
World Indoor Championship
| Gold medal – first place | 1999 | Men's team recurve |

Matthew Gray (born 24 June 1973) is an Australian archer. His day job is being a water policeman. He has participated in three Olympic Games and won a gold medal at the 2010 Commonwealth Games.

== Personal ==
Born in Yea, Victoria, Gray is a water policeman. He is from Port Stephens. He is married, 47, and his wife is a school teacher. He has two daughters. He has a nursing degree. While training for the 2010 Commonwealth Games, he was also doing shift work at John James Hospital in Canberra.

== Archery ==
Gray competes in archery. His father bought him his first bow at a garage sale, and he has been competing in archery for over thirty years. He attributed becoming a cop with making him more aggressive as a competitor. He was an Australian Institute of Sport archery scholarship holder.

Gray has won several medals. At the 1988 World Field Championships in Bolzano, Italy, he won a bronze medal in the junior men's recurve event. At the 1992 World Field Championships in Margraten, Netherlands, he was part of the Australian gold medal winning men's team alongside Clint Freeman and Tony Pitt Lancaster. He won a bronze medal in the men's recurve event at the 1994 World Field Championships in Vertus, France.

Gray placed 4th in the teams event at the 1996 Atlanta Olympics. He won a gold in the men's recurve event at the 1998 European Grand Prix in Czech Republic. His teammates included Simon Fairweather, and Scott Hunter-Russell. In 1999, he won a team gold medal at the world indoor championships. At the 2008 World Cup in Santo Domingo Dominican Republic, he was part of the Australian silver medal winning recurve team that.

In March 2003, he was ranked the fourth best male Australian archer in recurve, ahead of Robert Turner. That month, he had 2520 points. In 2010, he participated in World Cup competitions in Croatia, Turkey and China. He attended a national team training camp in Canberra in September 2011. He attended a national team training camp in Canberra in March 2012. At the 2012 National Target Archery Championships, he finished fourth as a member of ANSW.

In preparation for the 2010 Commonwealth Games, he trained in his garage. He represented Australia at the 2010 Commonwealth Games. He competed in the men's recurve archery team event where he took home a gold medal with a team score of 219, defeating Malaysia who were ranked third in the world at the time and had an event score of 212. He also competed in the individual event on the final day of the competition. In the quarter finals, he went up against Chu Sian Cheng. At the Games, he was coached by Simon Fairweather. He was Australia's oldest competitor at the Games. In 2010, he was hoping his Commonwealth Games experiences would prepare him for Olympic selection for 2012 in London.

He has participated in three Olympic Games in the archery event. He represented Australia in archery at the 2000 Summer Olympics, the 2004 Summer Olympics and the 2008 Summer Olympics. As a thirty-five-year-old, he represented Australia in archery at the 2008 Summer Olympics. He competed in both the team and individual events. Children in his wife's class cheered for him at the Games and he kept in touch with the class during the Games. Going into the knock out stage in the team competition, Australia was ranked ninth.

In one of the early rounds of the 2008 Games, he lost to Chu Sian Cheng of Malaysia. In September 2011, he was named to the Australian archery shadow Olympic team. In October 2011, he participated in a 2012 Summer Olympics test event in London at the Lord's cricket ground. In January 2012, he represented Australia at the 2012 Oceania Olympic qualifying event in New Zealand. In March at the 2012 Olympic Games Nomination Shoot Results, he finished fourth with a score of 2587.
