= Bair Badënov =

Russian archer (born 1976)

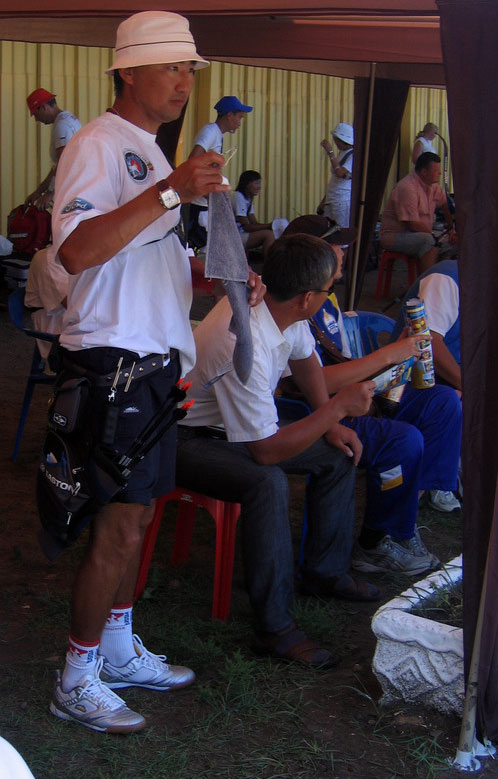
- Badënov at the 2009 Russian Archery Championship

Personal information
- Native name: Баир Доржиевич Бадёнов
- Full name: Bair Dorzhiyevich Badyonov
- Born: June 28, 1976 (age 49) Zugalay, Russia
- Height: 178 cm (5 ft 10 in)
- Weight: 75 kg (165 lb)
Medal record
Men's recurve archery
Representing Russia
Olympic Games
Bronze medal – third place	2008 Beijing	Individual
World Indoor Championships
Silver medal – second place	2012 Las Vegas	Team
European Championships
Gold medal – first place	1996 Kranjska Gora	Team
Silver medal – second place	1994 Nymburk	Team
European Indoor Championships
Silver medal – second place	2008 Turin	Individual
World Youth Championships
Gold medal – first place	1993 Moliets	Individual

Bair Badënov (Russian: Баи́р Доржи́евич Бадёнов, Baír Dorzhíyevich Badyónov, pronounced [bɐˈir dɐrˈʐɨɪvʲɪtɕ bɐˈdʲɵnəf]; born June 28, 1976, in Zugalay, now Zabaykalsky Krai) is a Russian archer of Buryat-Mongolian ancestry.

Badënov was a World Champion among Youth in 1993, a European champion in 1996. Participated in 1996 Olympics in Atlanta and was 4th in 2000 Olympics in Sydney. In 2007 he won the World Cup in Turkey, and silver in individual competition at the European competitions in Turin, Italy.

== 2008 Summer Olympics ==
At the 2008 Summer Olympics in Beijing Badënov finished his ranking round with a total of 658 points. This gave him the 31st seed for the final competition bracket in which he faced Laurence Godfrey in the first round, beating the British 114–109. In the second round Badënov defeated second seed Mangal Singh Champia with 109-108 and reached the semi-finals by beating Jason Lyon (115–110) and Cheng Chu Sian (109–104) in the third round and quarter final. In the semi-final he and Viktor Ruban both came to 112 points in the regular match and had to go to an extra round. In this extra round Badënov scored 18 points, while Ruban advanced to the final with 20 points. Ruban would win the final and take the Olympic gold.

He also took part in the team event. With his 658 score from the ranking round combined with the 660 of Abramov and the 671 of Tsyrempilov Russia was in fourth position after the ranking round, which gave them a straight seed into the quarter-finals. However, with 217-209 they were beaten by the team from China that eventually won the bronze medal.
