= 2007 World Archery Championships – Men's individual recurve =

The men's individual recurve competition at the 2007 World Archery Championships took place in July 2007 in Leipzig, Germany. 173 archers entered the competition. Following a qualifying FITA round, the top 128 archers qualified for the 7-round knockout round, drawn according to their qualification round scores. The semi-finals and finals then took place on 15 July.

The competition doubled as qualification for the 2008 Olympic competition.

== Qualifying ==
The following archers were the leading 16 qualifiers:

1. (South Korea) Lee Chang-hwan (4th round)
2. (South Korea) Im Dong-hyun (Champion)
3. (Chinese Taipei) Kuo Cheng-wei (2nd round)
4. (United Kingdom) Simon Terry (4th place)
5. (Japan) Takaharu Furukawa (4th round)
6. (United Kingdom) Larry Godfrey (2nd round)
7. (Sweden) Magnus Petersson (4th round)
8. (South Korea) Kim Yeon-chul (Quarterfinal)
9. (Ukraine) Viktor Ruban (3rd round)
10. (Italy) Marco Galiazzo (2nd round)
11. (Australia) Sky Kim (3rd round)
12. (Italy) Michele Frangilli (2nd round)
13. (France) Romain Girouille (2nd round)
14. (India) Rahul Banerjee (2nd round)
15. (Japan) Ryota Amano (1st round)
16. (Netherlands) Wietse van Alten (2nd round)

== Draw ==
=== Top Half ===
==== Section 1 ====
1st round
1	(South Korea) Lee Chang-hwan	112
128	(Philippines) M Cordero	103
65	(Czech Republic) Martin Bulir	102
64	(India) Tarundeep Rai	104
33	(Canada) Crispin Duenas	108
96	(Mongolia) Jantsan Gantugs	106
97	(Bulgaria) Yavor Hristov	111
32	(Canada) Hugh MacDonald	103
17	(Russia) Baljinima Tsyrempilov	114
112	(Republic of Ireland) Eoghan O'Donoghue	103
81	(Kazakhstan) Aleksandr Mozhar	113
48	(Mexico) Jorge Pablo Chapoy	106
49	(Russia) Bair Badenov	112
80	(Brazil) Leonardo de Carvalho	109
113	(Azerbaijan) Emil Akchurin	99
16	(Netherlands) Wietse van Alten	108

2nd round
1	(South Korea) Lee Chang-hwan	112
64	(India) Tarundeep Rai	108
33	(Canada) Crispin Duenas	110
97	(Bulgaria) Yavor Hristov	109
17	(Russia) Baljinima Tsyrempilov	111
81	(Kazakhstan) Aleksandr Mozhar	107
49	(Russia) Bair Badenov	110
16	(Netherlands) Wietse van Alten	108

3rd round
1	(South Korea) Lee Chang-hwan	112
33	(Canada) Crispin Duenas	111
17	(Russia) Baljinima Tsyrempilov	112
49	(Russia) Bair Badenov	109

4th round
1	(South Korea) Lee Chang-hwan	109
17	(Russia) Baljinima Tsyrempilov	111

==== Section 2 ====
1st round
9	(Ukraine) Viktor Ruban	109
120	(Qatar) Ali Salem	103
73	(Greece) Prodromos Stamatopoulos	98
56	(Malaysia) Wan Khalmizam	104
41	(Norway) Bård Nesteng	107
88	(Brazil) Marcos A Bortoloto	99
105	(Hungary) Csaba Gajdos	103
24	(China) Yong Fujun	110
25	(China) Jiang Lin	108
104	(Netherlands) Ron van der Hoff	100
89	(Hungary) Tibor Ondrik	104
40	(Australia) Michael Naray	106
57	(Slovenia) Matej Zupanc	106
72	(France) Thomas Naglieri	102
121	(Finland) Tero Lindroos	105
8	(South Korea) Kim Yeon-chul	112

2nd round
9	(Ukraine) Viktor Ruban	109
56	(Malaysia) Wan Khalmizam	108
41	(Norway) Bård Nesteng	106
24	(China) Yong Fujun	107
25	(China) Jiang Lin	107
40	(Australia) Michael Naray	105
57	(Slovenia) Matej Zupanc	105
8	(South Korea) Kim Yeon-chul	113

3rd round
9	(Ukraine) Viktor Ruban	109
24	(China) Yong Fujun	111
25	(China) Jiang Lin	108
8	(South Korea) Kim Yeon-chul	110

4th round
24	(China) Yong Fujun	109
8	(South Korea) Kim Yeon-chul	114

==== Section 3 ====
1st round
5	(Japan) Takaharu Furukawa	115
124	(South Africa) Calvin Hartley	104
69	(Belgium) Alain Auten	106
60	(Turkey) Tunc Kucukkayalar	104
37	(Germany) Florian Floto	104
92	(Denmark) Dennis Bager	100
101	(Spain) Andrés Gómez	95
28	(United States) Victor Wunderle	112
21	(United States) Brady Ellison	106
108	(Brazil) Fabio Emilio	103
85	(Philippines) Mark Javier	107
44	(Italy) Ilario di Buo	108
53	(Ukraine) Markiyan Ivashko	109
76	(Luxembourg) Jeff Henckels	103
117	(Cyprus) Costaninos Christodoulou	110
12	(Italy) Michele Frangilli	112

2nd round
5	(Japan) Takaharu Furukawa	114
69	(Belgium) Alain Auten	106
37	(Germany) Florian Floto	109
28	(United States) Victor Wunderle	111
21	(United States) Brady Ellison	109
44	(Italy) Ilario di Buo	108
53	(Ukraine) Markiyan Ivashko	114
12	(Italy) Michele Frangilli	105

3rd round
5	(Japan) Takaharu Furukawa	110
28	(United States) Victor Wunderle	108
21	(United States) Brady Ellison	106
53	(Ukraine) Markiyan Ivashko	111

4th round
5	(Japan) Takaharu Furukawa	107
53	(Ukraine) Markiyan Ivashko	108

==== Section 4 ====
1st round
13	(France) Romain Girouille	105
116	(Lithuania) Lenardas Bernotas	99
77	(Sweden) Goran Bjerendal	97
52	(Belarus) Mikalai Marusau	110
45	(Netherlands) Pieter Custers	107
84	(Switzerland) Chris Marsh	104
109	(Cuba) Juan Carlos Stevens	97^{9}
20	(Mexico) Eduardo Vélez	97^{10}
29	(Canada) Jason Lyon	111
100	(Latvia) Eduards Lapsins	110
93	(Russia) Ilia Sidorin	105
36	(Spain) Daniel Morillo	102
61	(Bhutan) Tashi Peljor	103
68	(Sweden) Stefan Nilsson	102
125	(Austria) Stefan Zangerl	108
4	(United Kingdom) Simon Terry	109

2nd round
13	(France) Romain Girouille	108
52	(Belarus) Mikalai Marusau	110
45	(Netherlands) Pieter Custers	108^{10;9}
20	(Mexico) Eduardo Vélez	108^{10;10}
29	(Canada) Jason Lyon	109
93	(Russia) Ilia Sidorin	106
61	(Bhutan) Tashi Peljor	107
4	(United Kingdom) Simon Terry	109

3rd round
52	(Belarus) Mikalai Marusau	103
20	(Mexico) Eduardo Vélez	105
29	(Canada) Jason Lyon	109
4	(United Kingdom) Simon Terry	114

4th round
20	(Mexico) Eduardo Vélez	105
4	(United Kingdom) Simon Terry	113

=== Bottom Half ===
==== Section 5 ====
1st round
3	(Chinese Taipei) Kuo Cheng-wei	107
126	(Portugal) Domingos Vaquinhas	105
67	(Kazakhstan) Igor Kovalev	103
62	(Japan) Ryuichi Moriya	115
35	(Denmark) Niels Dall	106^{9}
94	(Belgium) Jean-Michel Piquet	106^{8}
99	(El Salvador) Cristobal Antonio Merlos	100
30	(Israel) Yaron Tal	108
19	(Malaysia) Muhammad Marbawi	101
110	(Hungary) Csaba Toth	95
83	(Croatia) Kresimir Strukelj	97
46	(Chinese Taipei) Liu Ming-huang	105
51	(Malaysia) Cheng Chu Sian	112
78	(Belarus) Alexander Liahushev	99
115	(Armenia) Andranik Shahnazaryan	99
14	(India) Rahul Banerjee	108

2nd round
3	(Chinese Taipei) Kuo Cheng-wei	110^{10;9}
62	(Japan) Ryuichi Moriya	110^{10;10}
35	(Denmark) Niels Dall	107
30	(Israel) Yaron Tal	104
19	(Malaysia) Muhammad Marbawi	107
46	(Chinese Taipei) Liu Ming-huang	106
51	(Malaysia) Cheng Chu Sian	110
14	(India) Rahul Banerjee	108

3rd round
62	(Japan) Ryuichi Moriya	104
35	(Denmark) Niels Dall	108
19	(Malaysia) Muhammad Marbawi	106
51	(Malaysia) Cheng Chu Sian	109

4th round
35	(Denmark) Niels Dall	104
51	(Malaysia) Cheng Chu Sian	109

==== Section 6 ====
1st round
11	(Australia) Sky Kim	108
118	(Moldova) Semion Popov	102
75	(France) Thomas Aubert	100
54	(India) Somai Murmu	103
43	(United Kingdom) Alan Wills	107
86	(Finland) Juuso Huhtala	101
107	(Switzerland) Armand Stuby	98
22	(Chinese Taipei) Wang Cheng-pang	111
27	(Australia) David Barnes	110
102	(Armenia) Hovanes Petrosyan	99
91	(Luxembourg) Gilles Decker	109
38	(Poland) Piotr Piątek	108
59	(Belarus) Anton Prilepau	106
70	(Republic of Ireland) Keith Hanlon	104
123	(Czech Republic) Rostislav Panik	99
6	(United Kingdom) Laurence Godfrey	104

2nd round
11	(Australia) Sky Kim	114
54	(India) Somai Murmu	102
43	(United Kingdom) Alan Wills	109
22	(Chinese Taipei) Wang Cheng-pang	107
27	(Australia) David Barnes	109
91	(Luxembourg) Gilles Decker	106
59	(Belarus) Anton Prilepau	104
6	(United Kingdom) Laurence Godfrey	103

3rd round
11	(Australia) Sky Kim	111
43	(United Kingdom) Alan Wills	117
27	(Australia) David Barnes	111
59	(Belarus) Anton Prilepau	103

4th round
43	(United Kingdom) Alan Wills	108
27	(Australia) David Barnes	103

==== Section 7 ====
1st round
7	(Sweden) Magnus Petersson	111
122	(Slovakia) Vladimir Majercak Jr.	96
71	(Romania) Cezar Paulet	104
58	(Ukraine) Pavlo Bekker	105
39	(Poland) Rafał Dobrowolski	103
90	(Spain) Felipe López	99
103	(Czech Republic) Michael Hodac	97
26	(Germany) Jens Pieper	109
23	(China) Xue Haifeng	107
106	(Moldova) Dmitri Dancov	94
87	(Portugal) Nuno Pombo	96
42	(Iran) Milad Vaziri	101
55	(Kazakhstan) Oibek Saidiyev	100
74	(Turkey) Göktuğ Ergin	103
119	(Finland) Tuomas Maatta	97
10	(Italy) Marco Galiazzo	106

2nd round
7	(Sweden) Magnus Petersson	109
58	(Ukraine) Pavlo Bekker	108
39	(Poland) Rafał Dobrowolski	106
26	(Germany) Jens Pieper	107
23	(China) Xue Haifeng	108
42	(Iran) Milad Vaziri	107
74	(Turkey) Göktuğ Ergin	105
10	(Italy) Marco Galiazzo	103

3rd round
7	(Sweden) Magnus Petersson	112
26	(Germany) Jens Pieper	107
23	(China) Xue Haifeng	108
74	(Turkey) Göktuğ Ergin	104

4th round
7	(Sweden) Magnus Petersson	107
23	(China) Xue Haifeng	108

==== Section 8 ====
1st round
15	(Japan) Ryota Amano	107
114	(Iran) Hojjatollah Vaezi	112
79	(Slovenia) Matija Zlender	101
50	(Turkey) Vedat Erbay	100
47	(United States) Richard Johnson	103
82	(Slovenia) Matej Povz	109
111	(Romania) Alexandru Bodnar	108
18	(Mexico) Juan René Serrano	107
31	(Slovakia) Daniel Kravacek	102
98	(Romania) Razvan Marcu	106
95	(Bulgaria) Daniel Pavlov	104
34	(Poland) Jacek Proc	96
63	(Denmark) Johan Weiss	100
66	(Belgium) Steven Clart	92
127	(Austria) Peter Kos	102
2	(South Korea) Im Dong-hyun	111

2nd round
114	(Iran) Hojjatollah Vaezi	102
79	(Slovenia) Matija Zlender	99
47	(United States) Richard Johnson	102
111	(Romania) Alexandru Bodnar	103
98	(Romania) Razvan Marcu	101
95	(Bulgaria) Daniel Pavlov	104
63	(Denmark) Johan Weiss	105
2	(South Korea) Im Dong-hyun	112

3rd round
114	(Iran) Hojjatollah Vaezi	106
111	(Romania) Alexandru Bodnar	104
95	(Bulgaria) Daniel Pavlov	108
2	(South Korea) Im Dong-hyun	109

4th round
114	(Iran) Hojjatollah Vaezi	102
2	(South Korea) Im Dong-hyun	111

== Finals ==
Quarterfinals
17	(Russia) Baljinima Tsyrempilov	112
8	(South Korea) Kim Yeon-chul	109
53	(Ukraine) Markiyan Ivashko	108^{9}
4	(United Kingdom) Simon Terry	108^{10}
51	(Malaysia) Cheng Chu Sian	106
43	(United Kingdom) Alan Wills	107
23	(China) Xue Haifeng	107
2	(South Korea) Im Dong-hyun	112

Semifinals
17	(Russia) Baljinima Tsyrempilov	111
4	(United Kingdom) Simon Terry	108
43	(United Kingdom) Alan Wills	107
2	(South Korea) Im Dong-hyun	115

Finals
17	(Russia) Baljinima Tsyrempilov	108
2	(South Korea) Im Dong-hyun	110
Third place
4	(United Kingdom) Simon Terry	112^{9}
43	(United Kingdom) Alan Wills	112^{10}
