= Archery at the 2015 Pan American Games – Men's individual =

Archery – Men's individual at the 2015 Pan American Games
- Venue: Varsity Stadium
- Dates: July 14–18
- Competitors: 32 from 14 nations

Medalists
Gold medal	Luis Álvarez	Mexico
Silver medal	Brady Ellison	United States
Bronze medal	Jason Lyon	Canada

The men's individual competition of the archery events at the 2015 Pan American Games will be held between July 14 and 18 at the Varsity Stadium. The defending Pan American Games champion is Brady Ellison of the United States.

== Schedule ==
All times are Central Standard Time (UTC-6).

Date	Time	Round
July 14, 2015	10:00	Qualification
July 16, 2015	10:00	Round of 32, Round of 16, Quarterfinals
July 18, 2015	10:35	Semifinals, Finals

== Results ==
=== Ranking round ===
Rank	Archer	Nation	Score	Note
1	Zach Garrett	United States	673	
2	Collin Klimitchek	United States	669	
3	Brady Ellison	United States	664	
4	Marcus Vinicius D'Almeida	Brazil	664	
5	Luis Álvarez	Mexico	663	
6	Ernesto Horacio Boardman	Mexico	659	
7	Hugo Franco	Cuba	658	
8	Juan René Serrano	Mexico	656	
9	Crispin Duenas	Canada	655	
10	Daniel Pineda	Colombia	653	
11	Juan Carlos Stevens	Cuba	652	
12	Adrián Puentes	Cuba	651	
13	Guillermo Aguilar Gimpel	Chile	650	
14	Elías Malavé	Venezuela	650	
15	Jason Lyon	Canada	647	
16	Andrés Aguilar Gimpel	Chile	643	
17	Hugo Robles	Argentina	642	
18	Patrick Rivest-Bunster	Canada	637	
19	Jose Alvarez	Ecuador	635	
20	Daniel Xavier	Brazil	633	
21	Daniel Betancur	Colombia	632	
22	Bernardo Oliveira	Brazil	631	
23	Daniel Pacheco	Colombia	626	
24	José Irizarry	Puerto Rico	624	
25	Thomas Flossbach	Guatemala	623	
26	Jean Pizarro	Puerto Rico	620	
27	Daniel Martínez	Dominican Republic	619	
28	Oscar Ticas	El Salvador	618	
29	Diego Castro	Guatemala	616	
30	Daniel Cannelli	Argentina	611	
31	Felipe Perez Alvarez	Chile	595	
32	Andrés Alfonseca	Dominican Republic	574	

=== Competition rounds ===
==== Finals ====
Semifinals
1	Zach Garrett (USA)	2	0	1	0	0
5	Luis Álvarez (MEX)	0	2	1	2	2
3	Brady Ellison (USA)	2	2	2
15	Jason Lyon (CAN)	0	0	0

Finals
5	Luis Álvarez (MEX)	2	2	0	0	2
3	Brady Ellison (USA)	0	0	2	2	0
Third place
1	Zach Garrett (USA)	0	0	0
15	Jason Lyon (CAN)	2	2	2

==== Top half ====
Round of 32
1	Z Garrett (USA)	2	1	2	2
32	A Alfonseca (DOM)	0	1	0	0
17	H Robles (ARG)	2	0	1	2	0	1
16	A Aguilar Gimpel (CHI)	0	2	1	0	2	0
9	C Duenas (CAN)	0	0	2	2	1	0
24	J Irizarry (PUR)	2	2	0	0	1	1
25	T Flossbach (GUA)	2	2	0	1	1
8	JR Serrano (MEX)	0	0	2	1	1
5	L Álvarez (MEX)	2	2	2
28	O Ticas (ESA)	0	0	0
21	D Betancur (COL)	0	1	2	2	2
12	A Puentes (CUB)	2	1	0	0	0
13	G Aguilar Gimpel (CHI)	0	0	2	2	0
20	D Xavier (BRA)	2	2	0	0	2
29	D Castro (GUA)	0	0	0
4	MV D'Almeida (BRA)	2	2	2

Round of 16
1	Z Garrett (USA)	2	2	0	2
17	H Robles (ARG)	0	0	2	0
24	J Irizarry (PUR)	0	0	0
25	T Flossbach (GUA)	2	2	2
5	L Álvarez (MEX)	2	2	2
21	D Betancur (COL)	0	0	0
20	D Xavier (BRA)	0	2	2	0	1	0
4	MV D'Almeida (BRA)	2	0	0	2	1	1

Quarterfinals
1	Z Garrett (USA)	0	2	2	2
25	T Flossbach (GUA)	2	0	0	0
5	L Álvarez (MEX)	0	2	2	1	2
4	MV D'Almeida (BRA)	2	0	0	1	0

Semifinals
1	Z Garrett (USA)	2	0	1	0	0
5	L Álvarez (MEX)	0	2	1	2	2

==== Bottom half ====
Round of 32
3	B Ellison (USA)	0	2	2	2
30	D Cannelli (ARG)	2	0	0	0
19	J Alvarez (ECU)	0	0	1	0
14	E Malavé (VEN)	2	2	1	2
11	JC Stevens (CUB)	1	0	0	2	2	1
22	B Oliveira (BRA)	1	2	2	0	0	0
27	D Martínez (DOM)	2	2	2
6	EH Boardman (MEX)	0	0	0
7	H Franco (CUB)	2	0	0	2	0
26	J Pizarro (PUR)	0	2	2	0	2
23	D Pacheco (COL)	0	0	0
10	D Pineda (COL)	2	2	2
15	J Lyon (CAN)	2	2	0	0	2
18	P Rivest-Bunster (CAN)	0	0	2	2	0
31	F Perez Alvarez (CHI)	1	0	0	0
2	C Klimitchek (USA)	1	2	2	2

Round of 16
3	B Ellison (USA)	1	2	0	0	2	1
14	E Malavé (VEN)	1	0	2	2	0	0
11	JC Stevens (CUB)	2	0	1	2	2
27	D Martínez (DOM)	0	2	1	0	0
26	J Pizarro (PUR)	0	2	1	0	2	0
10	D Pineda (COL)	2	0	1	2	0	1
15	J Lyon (CAN)	2	2	0	2
2	C Klimitchek (USA)	0	0	2	0

Quarterfinals
3	B Ellison (USA)	2	2	2
11	JC Stevens (CUB)	0	0	0
10	D Pineda (COL)	1	0	0	2	1
15	J Lyon (CAN)	1	2	2	0	1

Semifinals
3	B Ellison (USA)	2	2	2
15	J Lyon (CAN)	0	0	0
