= Archery at the 2015 Pan American Games – Men's team =

Archery – Men's team at the 2015 Pan American Games
- Venue: Varsity Stadium
- Dates: July 14–17
- Competitors: 21 from 7 nations

Medalists
Gold medal	Juan René Serrano; Ernesto Horacio Boardman; Luis Álvarez	Mexico
Silver medal	Zach Garrett; Brady Ellison; Collin Klimitchek	United States
Bronze medal	Marcus Vinicius D'Almeida; Bernardo Oliveira; Daniel Xavier	Brazil

The men's team competition of the archery events at the 2015 Pan American Games will be held between July 14 and 18 at the Varsity Stadium. The defending Pan American Games champions are the United States.

== Schedule ==
All times are Central Standard Time (UTC-6).

Date	Time	Round
July 14, 2015	10:00	Qualification
July 17, 2015	11:00	Quarterfinals
July 17, 2015	11:30	Semifinals
July 17, 2015	12:40	Finals

== Results ==
=== Qualification ===
Rank	Nation	Archers	Score Ind	Score Team	Note
1	United States	Zach Garrett	673	2006	
1	United States	Brady Ellison	664	2006	
1	United States	Collin Klimitchek	669	2006	
2	Mexico	Juan René Serrano	656	1978	
2	Mexico	Ernesto Horacio Boardman	659	1978	
2	Mexico	Luis Álvarez	663	1978	
3	Cuba	Hugo Franco	658	1961	
3	Cuba	Juan Carlos Stevens	652	1961	
3	Cuba	Adrián Puentes	651	1961	
4	Canada	Crispin Duenas	655	1939	
4	Canada	Jason Lyon	647	1939	
4	Canada	Patrick Rivest-Bunster	637	1939	
5	Brazil	Marcus Vinicius D'Almeida	664	1928	
5	Brazil	Bernardo Oliveira	631	1928	
5	Brazil	Daniel Xavier	633	1928	
6	Colombia	Daniel Pineda	653	1911	
6	Colombia	Daniel Betancur	632	1911	
6	Colombia	Daniel Pacheco	626	1911	
7	Chile	Guillermo Aguilar Gimpel	650	1888	
7	Chile	Andres Aguilar Gimpel	643	1888	
7	Chile	Felipe Perez Alvarez	595	1888	

=== Elimination rounds ===
Quarterfinals
5	Brazil	2	2	2
4	Canada	0	0	0
3	Cuba	0	0	2	2	1
6	Colombia	2	2	0	0	0
7	Chile	0	0	0
2	Mexico	2	2	2

Semifinals
1	United States	2	2	2
5	Brazil	0	0	0
3	Cuba	1	0	1	2	0
2	Mexico	1	2	1	0	1

Finals
1	United States	2	0	0	0
2	Mexico	0	2	2	2
Third place
5	Brazil	2	0	2	1
3	Cuba	0	2	0	1
