= Archery at the 2011 Pan American Games – Men's individual =

Archery – Men's individual at the 2011 Pan American Games
- Venue: Pan American Archery Stadium
- Dates: October 17 - October 22
- Competitors: 32 from 13 nations

Medalists
Gold medal	Brady Ellison	United States
Silver medal	Crispin Duenas	Canada
Bronze medal	Daniel Pineda	Colombia

The men's individual competition of the archery events at the 2011 Pan American Games was held between October 17 and 22 at the Pan American Archery Stadium. The defending Pan American Games champion was Adrián Puentes of Cuba. While the Pan American Championship, champion is William Brady also of the United States.

== Schedule ==
All times are Central Standard Time (UTC-6).

Date	Time	Round
October 17, 2011	10:30	Qualification
October 18, 2011	10:30	Qualification
October 20, 2011	10:00	Sixteenth, eight and quarterfinals.
October 22, 2011	10:00	Semifinals/Finals

== Results ==
=== Ranking round ===
Seed	Archer	Score	Seed	Archer	Score
1	Brady Ellison (USA)	1356 PR	17	Diego Torres (COL)	1262
2	Crispin Duenas (CAN)	1337	18	Jaime Quintana (CUB)	1261
3	Daniel Pineda (COL)	1333	19	Nolan Cintron (PUR)	1259
4	Juan Serrano (MEX)	1325	20	Patrick Rivest-Bunster (CAN)	1251
5	Joe Fanchin (USA)	1324	21	Kevin Vargas (ECU)	1248
6	Juan Stevens (CUB)	1323	22	Manuel Diaz (VEN)	1242
7	Jason Lyon (CAN)	1321	23	Fabio Emilio (BRA)	1239
8	Pedro Vivas (MEX)	1314	24	Julio Barillas (GUA)	1231
9	Elías Malavé (VEN)	1310	25	Christian Medina (CHI)	1229
10	Jake Kaminski (USA)	1305	26	Daniel Pacheco (COL)	1224
11	Eduardo Vélez (MEX)	1300	27	Genaro Riccio (ARG)	1211
12	Xavier Rezende (BRA)	1300	28	David Vilchez (VEN)	1201
13	Luiz Trainini (BRA)	1291	29	Martin Lazo (ECU)	1188
14	Hugo Franco (CUB)	1284	30	Mario Valdes (CHI)	1161
15	Miguel Veliz (ESA)	1271	31	Cristobal Merlos (ESA)	1158
16	Oscar Ticas (ESA)	1267	32	Diego Ramos (ECU)	1091

=== Competition rounds ===
==== Finals ====
Semifinals
Brady Ellison (USA)	6
Juan Serrano (MEX)	2
Daniel Pineda (COL)	4
Crispin Duenas (CAN)	6

Final
Brady Ellison (USA)	6
Crispin Duenas (CAN)	4
Bronze medal match
Juan Serrano (MEX)	1
Daniel Pineda (COL)	7

==== Top half ====
Round of 32
1	Brady Ellison (USA)	7
32	Diego Ramos (ECU)	1
17	Diego Torres (COL)	2
16	Oscar Tics (ESA)	6
9	Elías Malavé (VEN)	6
24	Julio Barillas (GUA)	0
25	Christian Medina (CHI)	4
8	Pedro Vivas (MEX)	6
5	Joe Fanchin (USA)	4
28	David Vilchez (VEN)	6
21	Kevin Vargas (ECU)	0
12	Xavier Rezende (BRA)	6
13	Luiz Trainini (BRA)	7
20	Patrick Rivest-Bunster (CAN)	3
29	Martin Lazo (ECU)	0
4	Juan Serrano (MEX)	6

Round of 16
1	Brady Ellison (USA)	6
16	Oscar Ticas (ESA)	0
9	Elías Malavé (VEN)	6
8	Pedro Vivas (MEX)	2
28	David Vilchez (VEN)	2
12	Xavier Rezende (BRA)	6
13	Luiz Trainini (BRA)	2
4	Juan Serrano (MEX)	6

Quarterfinals
1	Brady Ellison (USA)	6
9	Elías Malavé (VEN)	0
12	Xavier Rezende (BRA)	4
4	Juan Serrano (MEX)	6

Semifinals
1	Brady Ellison (USA)	6
4	Juan Serrano (MEX)	2

==== Bottom half ====
Round of 32
3	Daniel Pineda (COL)	7
30	Mario Valdes (CHI)	1
19	Nolan Cintron (PUR)	2
14	Hugo Franco (CUB)	6
11	Eduardo Vélez (MEX)	7
22	Manuel Diaz (VEN)	1
27	Genaro Riccio (ARG)	0
6	Juan Stevens (CUB)	6
7	Jason Lyon (CAN)	7
26	Daniel Pacheco (COL)	3
23	Fabio Emilio (BRA)	0
10	Jake Kaminski (USA)	6
15	Miguel Veliz (ESA)	1
18	Jaime Quintana (CUB)	7
31	Cristobal Merlos (ESA)	0
2	Crispin Duenas (CAN)	6

Round of 16
3	Daniel Pineda (COL)	7
14	Hugo Franco (CUB)	1
11	Eduardo Vélez (MEX)	2
6	Juan Stevens (CUB)	6
7	Jason Lyon (CAN)	3
10	Jake Kaminski (USA)	7
18	Jaime Quintana (CUB)	0
2	Crispin Duenas (CAN)	6

Quarterfinals
3	Daniel Pineda (COL)	6
6	Juan Stevens (CUB)	2
10	Jake Kaminski (USA)	0
2	Crispin Duenas (CAN)	6

Semifinals
3	Daniel Pineda (COL)	4
2	Crispin Duenas (CAN)	6
