= Archery at the 2019 Pan American Games – Women's individual recurve =

Women's individual recurve at the 2019 Pan American Games
- Venue: Complejo Villa María del Triunfo
- Dates: 7–11 August 2019
- Competitors: 32 from 14 nations

Medalists
Gold medal	Alejandra Valencia	Mexico
Silver medal	Khatuna Lorig	United States
Bronze medal	Casey Kaufhold	United States

The women's individual recurve archery event at the 2019 Pan American Games was held from 7 August to 11 August at the Villa María del Triunfo sports complex in Lima, Peru. One of eight archery events as part of the 2019 Pan American catalogue of sports, it was the eleventh time the women's individual recurve competition had been contested at the Games. Thirty-two archers from fourteen nations qualified for the event.

The defending champion from the 2015 Pan American Games was Khatuna Lorig of United States. Lorig was defeated in her bid to become a back-to-back Pan American champion in the final by Mexico's Alejandra Valencia, who triumphed in five sets to win the gold medal for the second time, reclaiming the title she had previously won in 2011. Lorig finished with the silver medal, with Casey Kaufhold of the United States winning the bronze medal ahead of Colombia's Ana Rendón.

One qualification spot for the women's individual event at the 2020 Summer Olympics was available to the nation of the highest-ranked archer which had not already qualified for the Olympic Games. As Mexico and the United States had already achieved qualification spots prior to the conclusion of the event, the position went to Colombia through Rendón's fourth-place finish.

== Background ==
=== Qualification ===
A total of thirty-two qualification spots were available for the competition. Twenty-four places were reserved for the eight nations each entering the maximum berth of three archers through qualification for the women's team recurve event. The remaining eight places were available for the individuals of nations that had not already achieved a qualification spot. As host nation, Peru automatically qualified one individual place. Qualification was earned through two tournaments, the Pan American Archery Championships held in August 2018 in Medellín, Colombia, and a secondary tournament held in Santiago, Chile, in April 2019. Chile, Colombia, Bolivia, Brazil, Mexico, and the United States each qualified a team of three archers from the 2018 Pan American Archery Championships, Bolivia achieving qualification places in the women's archery event for the first time. Canada and Cuba later secured maximum berths at the Santiago tournament the following year, with Peru adding a second entry to their sole automatic qualifying spot. Six other nations additionally secured at least one qualification place over the two tournaments.

Khatuna Lorig, the defending champion from the Toronto Games four years previously, successfully qualified through the United States national team selection alongside newcomers Erin Mickelberry and 15-year-old Casey Kaufhold, with 2016 Summer Olympics competitor Mackenzie Brown as the reserve. Aída Román and Mariana Avitia, silver and bronze medalists at the 2012 Summer Olympics, were selected alongside Alejandra Valencia to form the Mexican team, the trio entering as the three highest ranked archers competing in the Games, Valencia the highest at world number 10. The host nation's team of two archers included the reigning Peruvian national champion Aleska Burga García. The inclusion of Graziela Paulino dos Santos within the Brazilian team marked the first time an indigenous Brazilian athlete was selected to compete at the Pan American Games.

== Format ==
An official World Archery target consists of ten evenly-spaced concentric rings. Shooting an arrow into the outermost ring scores one point; landing in the centre yellow circle earns the maximum ten points.

The women's individual was an outdoor recurve target archery event held to the World Archery-approved rules. Archers shot at a 122 cm-wide target from a distance of 70 metres, with between one and ten points awarded for each arrow depending on how close it landed to the centre of the target. The competition consisted of three stages spread over five days: an initial ranking round, four elimination rounds, and two finals matches, which decided the winners of the gold, silver, and bronze medals. In the ranking round, each of the 32 archers entering the competition shot a total of 72 arrows. The total score of each archer was used to seed the archers into the following four-round single-elimination tournament, the number one seed going to the highest-scoring archer.

The elimination rounds used the Archery Olympic Round set system introduced at the 2012 Summer Olympics. Each match consisted of a maximum of five sets, with archers each shooting three arrows per set. The archer with the highest score from their three arrows, for a maximum of 30, won the set, earning two set points. The archer with the lowest score in each set received zero points. If the score was tied, each archer received one point. The first archer to reach six set points was declared the winner. If the match was tied at five set points each after the maximum five sets were played, a single tie-breaker arrow was used with the archer shooting closest to centre of the target winning.

=== Schedule ===
Day	Date	Time	Round
12	Wednesday, 7 August 2019	11:30-13:45	Ranking round
13	Thursday, 8 August 2019	09:00-09:30; 10:10-10:40	1/16 elimination
13	Thursday, 8 August 2019	09:35-10:05; 10:45-11:15	1/8 elimination
13	Thursday, 8 August 2019	11:20-12:28	Quarter-finals
14	Sunday, 11 August 2019	13:00-13:34	Semi-finals
14	Sunday, 11 August 2019	14:08	Bronze medal match
14	Sunday, 11 August 2019	14:25	Gold medal match
All times are Peru Time (UTC-05:00); Source:

== Report ==
Alejandra Valencia topped the ranking round on the opening day of the competition with a new continental and Pan American Games record of 675 points, finishing thirteen points clear of Casey Kaufhold, whose total of 662 was a personal best, and twenty-two points clear of third-placed Aída Román. Defending champion Lorig placed sixth on 642 points.

=== Elimination rounds ===
The beginning of the elimination rounds on 8 August saw Bolivia's debut in the women's individual event come to a premature end, with Ebe Fernandez, Dhara Claros, and Ana Micaela Espinoza Garcia all losing in the 1/16 elimination round in straight sets. Chile's three entrants also suffered early exits. Isabella Bassi, the highest-placed Chilean archer in the ranking round, and Javier Andrades both lost in the opening round, the former falling to Guatemala's Cinthya Pellecer after shooting an eight to Pellecer's nine in a one-arrow shoot-off. Only Catalina Márquez Rojas of Chile's trio advanced beyond the first round after ending as the surprise victor in her encounter against ninth-seed Elizabeth Rodriguez of Cuba. She would later bow out after defeat to Erin Mickelberry in the second round. Brazil's three entries also fared poorly, with Graziela Paulino dos Santos losing in the opening 1/16 elimination round and Ane Marcelle dos Santos and Ana Sliatchicas Caetano departing shortly afterwards in the 1/8 elimination round. Caio Fiusa of Lance! subsequently described the day as "not a happy Thursday" for Brazilian archery.

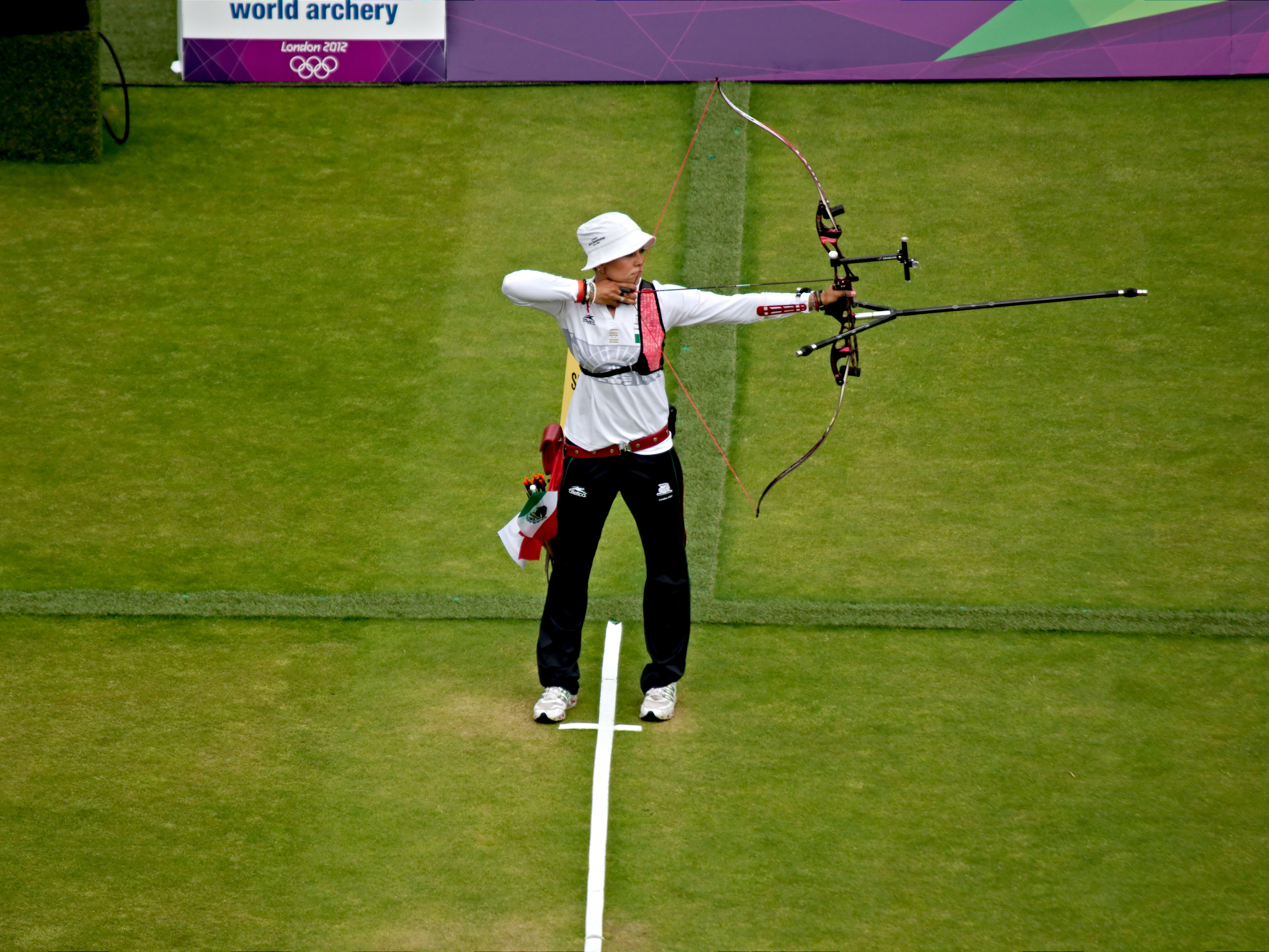
2012 Olympic silver medalist Aída Román (pictured in 2012) was eliminated in the quarter-finals.

The quarter-finals, which followed into the afternoon of 8 August, featured seven of the eight top seeds. Of the highest-placed archers from the ranking round only the seventh seed, Canada's Stephanie Barrett, failed to reach the last eight, having lost to Maira Sepulveda of Colombia - who finished 26th the previous day - in the 1/16 elimination round. The first quarter-final contest saw top seed Valencia defeat Erin Mickelberry in a one-arrow shoot-off after tying on five set points each, advancing to the semi-finals as the sole Mexican left in the competition; both of Valencia's teammates were eliminated in the following quarter-final contests, Román losing to Lorig and Avitia being defeated by fourth-seed Ana Rendón. Pellecer, the lowest seeded archer to progress to the quarter-finals, lost to Kaufhold in straight sets in the final quarter-final match. The progression of both Lorig and Kaufhold to the semi-finals, along with the successful American showing in the team events, marked the United States archery team's strongest international performance of the year.

=== Finals ===
After a two-day break the competition resumed on Sunday, 11 August for the two semi-final and the two medal-deciding matches. Valencia defeated Rendón in straight sets to advance to the gold medal final against Lorig, who defeated her younger teammate in an all-American second semi-final. As the two losing semifinalists, Rendón and Kaufhold went on to contest the third-placed match for the bronze medal. In a straight sets victory Kaufhold emerged victorious, her bronze medal earning her a third of the Games after earlier gold medal victories in the women's team and mixed team events.

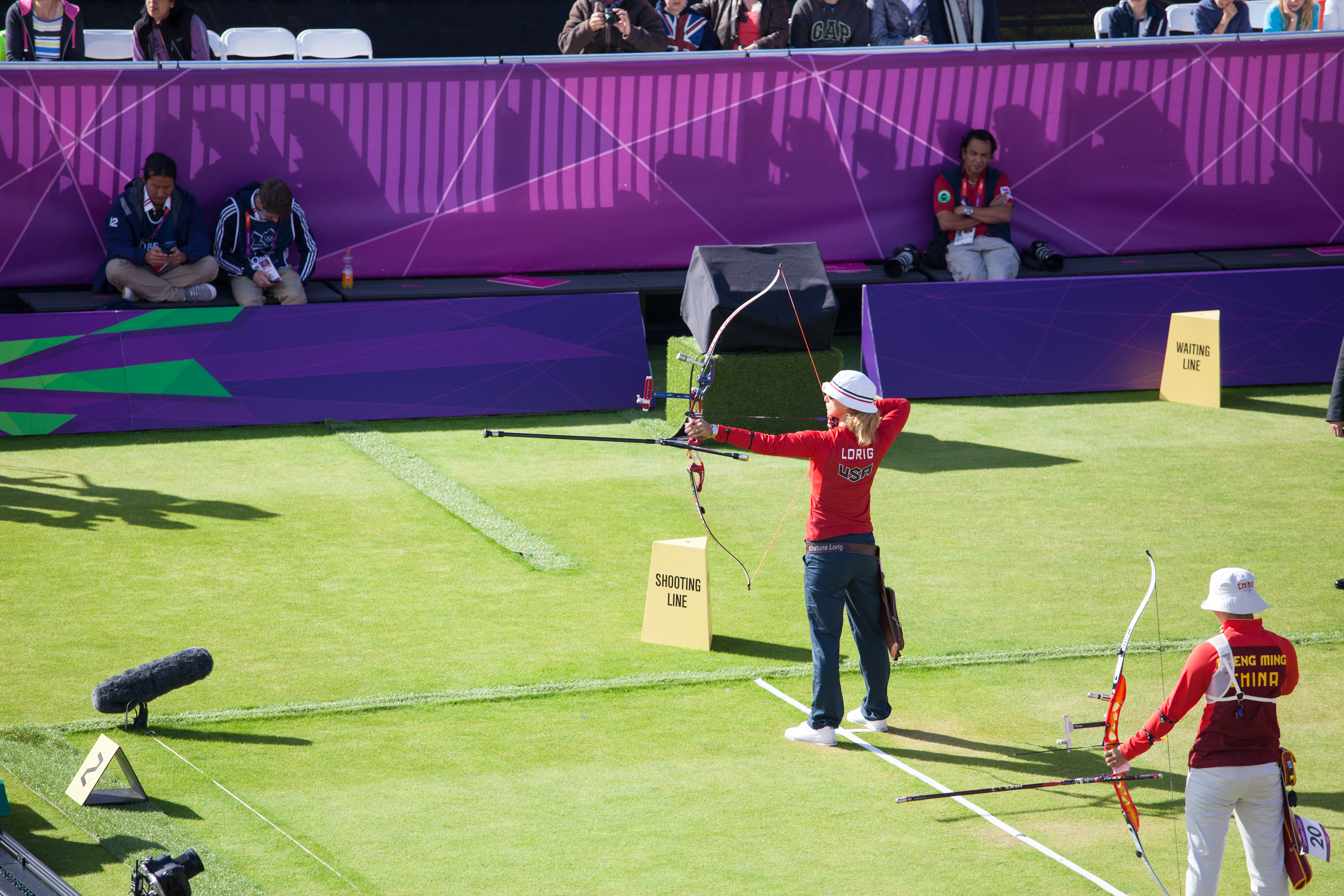
Defending champion Khatuna Lorig (pictured at the 2012 Summer Olympics) finished as runner-up with the silver medal.

In Valencia and Lorig the gold medal final pitted the 2011 and 2015 Pan American champions against one another. After three sets Valencia and Lorig were tied, but two near-perfect scores of 29 in the fourth and fifth sets was enough for the Mexican to pull ahead, winning by seven set points to Lorig's three. Valencia's win earned her a second Pan American individual gold medal and her third medal overall of the 2019 Games. Speaking after her victory Valencia said she enjoyed the match and was able to recover from some mistakes, adding "Let’s pretend Toronto didn’t happen as I didn’t make the finals there... I shot well today and the results followed." Ricardo Gutierrez of Yahoo! Deportes praised her style of play, writing that she showed "mettle, concentration, and definition in her shots" in overcoming the more experienced Lorig.

Valencia's win was Mexico's sole victory in the archery competitions of the 2019 Pan American Games and the nation's 37th gold medal of the Games, its highest Pan American tally away from home.

== Results ==
=== Ranking round ===
Rank	Archer	Half		Score	10s	Xs
Rank	Archer	1st	2nd	Score	10s	Xs
1	Alejandra Valencia (MEX)	340	335	675 CR	42	11
2	Casey Kaufhold (USA)	330	332	662	26	7
3	Aída Román (MEX)	328	325	653	26	8
4	Ana Rendón (COL)	319	333	652	29	5
5	Mariana Avitia (MEX)	317	326	643	26	6
6	Khatuna Lorig (USA)	325	317	642	22	8
7	Stephanie Barrett (CAN)	317	324	641	22	5
8	Erin Mickelberry (USA)	324	312	636	15	6
9	Elizabeth Rodriguez (CUB)	320	315	635	21	5
10	Isabella Bassi (CHI)	314	315	629	23	5
11	Florencia Leithold (ARG)	314	315	629	16	2
12	Ane Marcelle dos Santos (BRA)	314	315	629	12	4
13	Valentina Acosta (COL)	302	323	625	12	3
14	Pamela Velasquez Cuadros (PER)	307	315	622	15	5
15	Mayra Mendez (VEN)	307	307	614	15	1
16	Virginie Chénier (CAN)	300	313	613	14	4
17	Stefany Jerez (DOM)	295	317	612	16	4
18	Ana Sliatchicas Caetano (BRA)	311	299	610	14	1
19	Maydenia Sarduy (CUB)	309	300	609	13	6
20	Graziela Paulino dos Santos (BRA)	304	304	608	10	3
21	Gisela Yubrin (ARG)	309	298	607	15	3
22	Mariessa Pinto (CAN)	304	302	606	16	7
23	Cinthya Pellecer (GUA)	305	290	595	11	3
24	Catalina Marquez Rojas (CHI)	287	305	592	15	5
25	Ebe Fernandez (BOL)	302	290	592	8	3
26	Maira Sepúlveda (COL)	291	295	586	9	0
27	Karla Fals (CUB)	299	283	582	9	3
28	Aleska Burga García (PER)	295	287	582	8	1
29	Marcela Cortez (ESA)	294	285	579	13	4
30	Javiera Andrades (CHI)	275	286	561	13	3
31	Dahara Claros (BOL)	258	279	537	8	4
32	Ana Micaela Espinoza Garcia (BOL)	278	242	520	10	2

=== Elimination rounds ===
==== Top half ====
1/16 elimination
1	Alejandra Valencia (MEX)	6
32	Ana Micaela Espinoza Garcia (BOL)	0
17	Stefany Jerez (DOM)	2
16	Virginie Chénier (CAN)	6
9	Elizabeth Rodriguez (CUB)	2
24	Catalina Marquez Rojas (CHI)	6
25	Ebe Fernandez (BOL)	0
8	Erin Mickelberry (USA)	6
5	Mariana Avitia (MEX)	7
28	Aleska Burga Garcia (PER)	1
21	Gisela Yubrin (ARG)	3
12	Ane Marcelle dos Santos (BRA)	7
13	Valentina Acosta (COL)	6*
20	Graziela Paulino dos Santos (BRA)	5
29	Marcela Cortez (ESA)	2
4	Ana Rendón (COL)	6

1/8 elimination
1	Alejandra Valencia (MEX)	7
16	Virginie Chénier (CAN)	1
24	Catalina Marquez Rojas (CHI)	2
8	Erin Mickelberry (USA)	6
5	Mariana Avitia (MEX)	6
12	Ane Marcelle dos Santos (BRA)	2
13	Valentina Acosta (COL)	3
4	Ana Rendón (COL)	7

Quarter-finals
1	Alejandra Valencia (MEX)	6*
8	Erin Mickelberry (USA)	5
5	Mariana Avitia (MEX)	3
4	Ana Rendón (COL)	7

Semifinals
1	Alejandra Valencia (MEX)	6
4	Ana Rendón (COL)	0

==== Bottom half ====
1/16 elimination
3	Aída Román (MEX)	6
30	Javiera Andrades (CHI)	0
19	Maydenia Sarduy (CUB)	6
14	Pamela Velasquez Cuadros (PER)	2
11	Florencia Leithold (ARG)	7
22	Mariessa Pinto (CAN)	1
27	Karla Fals (CUB)	0
6	Khatuna Lorig (USA)	6
7	Stephanie Barrett (CAN)	4
26	Maira Sepúlveda (COL)	6
23	Cinthya Pellecer (GUA)	6*
10	Isabella Bassi (CHI)	5
15	Mayra Mendez (VEN)	1
18	Ana Sliatchicas Caetano (BRA)	7
31	Dahara Claros (BOL)	0
2	Casey Kaufhold (USA)	6

1/8 elimination
3	Aída Román (MEX)	6
19	Maydenia Sarduy (CUB)	0
11	Florencia Leithold (ARG)	0
6	Khatuna Lorig (USA)	6
26	Maira Sepúlveda (COL)	2
23	Cinthya Pellecer (GUA)	6
18	Ana Sliatchicas Caetano (BRA)	2
2	Casey Kaufhold (USA)	6

Quarter-finals
3	Aída Román (MEX)	4
6	Khatuna Lorig (USA)	6
23	Cinthya Pellecer (GUA)	0
2	Casey Kaufhold (USA)	6

Semifinals
6	Khatuna Lorig (USA)	6
2	Casey Kaufhold (USA)	4

Note: An asterisk (*) denotes a win from a one-arrow shoot-off

=== Finals ===
Semifinals
1	Alejandra Valencia (MEX)	6	29	26	27
4	Ana Rendón (COL)	0	26	22	25
6	Khatuna Lorig (USA)	6	30	28	26	27	26
2	Casey Kaufhold (USA)	4	26	27	27	28	25

Gold medal match
1	Alejandra Valencia (MEX) (gold)	7	28	27	26	29	29
6	Khatuna Lorig (USA) (silver)	3	27	27	27	26	25
Bronze medal match
4	Ana Rendón (COL)	0	26	24	27
2	Casey Kaufhold (USA) (bronze)	6	29	28	30

== See also ==
- Archery at the 2018 Asian Games – Women's individual recurve
- Archery at the 2019 European Games – Women's individual recurve
- Archery at the 2020 Summer Olympics – Women's individual
