= Archery at the 2015 Pan American Games – Women's individual =

Women's individual archery at the 2015 Pan American Games
- Venue: Varsity Stadium
- Dates: 14 – 18 July 2015
- Competitors: 32 from 13 nations

Medalists
Gold medal	Khatuna Lorig	United States
Silver medal	Ana Rendón	Colombia
Bronze medal	Karla Hinojosa	Mexico

The women's individual archery event at the 2015 Pan American Games was held from 14 to 18 July 2015 at the Varsity Stadium in Toronto, Canada. One of five archery events as part of the 2015 Pan American sporting programme, it was the tenth time the women's individual recurve competition had been contested at the Games. Thirty-two archers from thirteen nations qualified for the event.

The defending champion from the 2011 Pan American Games was Alejandra Valencia of Mexico. As she had achieved four years previously, Valencia was seeded first following the 72-arrow ranking round but was unexpectedly defeated by Colombia's Maira Sepúlveda in the 1/8 elimination round. Five-time Olympic athlete Khatuna Lorig of the United States emerged as champion, defeating Colombia's Ana Rendón in the final in four sets to take her first Pan American gold medal. Valencia's Mexican teammates Aída Román and Karla Hinojosa contested the bronze medal match, Hinojosa defeating the 2012 Olympic silver medalist to take third place.

== Background ==
An individual archery event for women has been a part of the Pan American Games programme since the sport's debut in 1979 in San Juan, Puerto Rico. The United States was the dominant nation in terms of gold medals won in the event, and at the previous Pan American Games held in 2011 in Guadalajara, Mexico, Alejandra Valencia became the second archer from outside the United States to win the women's individual gold medal, following Yaremis Pérez Ruiz of Cuba in 1999. (Note: Four additional women's individual events were held at the 1987, 1991 and 1995 Games, each event contested over different distances (70, 60, 50, and 30 metres respectively). The United States had also won all but one of these gold medals.) Valencia's victory over the American Miranda Leek four years previously also marked the first Mexican win in a Pan American archery event. Her compatriot Aída Román won the bronze medal ahead of Venezuela's Leidys Brito.

=== Qualification ===
There were thirty-two places available for the women's individual event, with the host nation Canada automatically receiving three spots. Qualification for the remaining twenty-nine positions took place over three tournaments: the Pan American Olympic Festival held in July 2014, the Pan American Championships in October 2014, and a final qualification round in March 2015. Eight nations (Argentina, Brazil, Chile, Colombia, Cuba, Mexico, the United States, and Venezuela) also successfully qualified the maximum berth of three archers, with the Dominican Republic qualifying two and Costa Rica, El Salvador, and Guatemala qualifying one archer apiece. (Note: Qualification places were assigned to the National Olympic Committees (NOCs) of the successful qualifying archer rather than the archer themselves. Each NOC was free to determine its entrants to the Pan American Games according to their own criteria.)

Mexico selected the defending bronze medalist from the 2015 Pan American Games, and silver medalist from the 2012 Summer Olympics, Aída Román to spearhead their three-member team, with defending champion Alejandra Valencia and Karla Hinojosa rounding out the squad. The United States entered a team of mixed experience, pairing five-time Olympian Khatuna Lorig alongside Ariel Gibilaro and La Nola Pritchard, who both made their Pan American Games debut. The head of the United States national archery organisation Denise Parker, herself the 1987 and 1991 Pan American Games individual women's champion, said 2015 represented a "season of change" in the United States archery team with the selection of newcomers in both the women's and men's teams. She however pointed to the a bronze medal won at the 2015 Archery World Cup stage held in Shanghai in May as proof of the women's potential for success.

Georcy-Stéphanie Picard and Virginie Chenier were selected as part of the Canadian team after finishing first and second in the Canadian national trials, partnering Kateri Vrakking who finished third. The 41-year old Vrakking, a five-time national champion, had been initially passed over as Canada's third entry with Archery Canada, the national archery organisation, instead selecting as their third representative nineteen year-old Shannon Davidson, who had finished fifth in the national trials. Following accusations of age discrimination, which Archery Canada denied, and threats of legal action, Davidson's selection was reversed and Vrakking was named to the team.

Yesenia Valencia was chosen to represent Guatemala at their maiden appearance at a Pan American Games women's archery event, having won a position in the final qualification round in March 2015.

== Format ==
=== Schedule ===
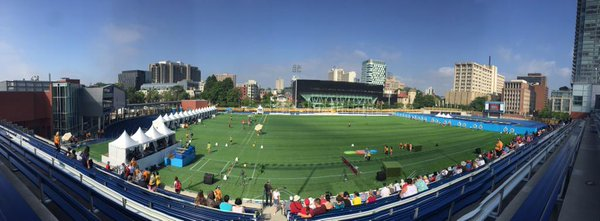
The Varsity Stadium at the University of Toronto hosted all the archery events of the 2015 Pan American Games.

Day	Date	Time	Round
Day 5	Tuesday July 14, 2015	10:00	Ranking round
Day 6	Wednesday July 15, 2015	10:00	1/16 elimination round
Day 6	Wednesday July 15, 2015	11:00	1/8 elimination round
Day 6	Wednesday July 15, 2015	11:30	Quarterfinals
Day 9	Saturday July 18, 2015	10:00	Semi-finals
Day 9	Saturday July 18, 2015	11:29	Bronze medal match
Day 9	Saturday July 18, 2015	11:47	Gold medal match
All times are North American Central Standard Time (UTC-06:00). Source:

== Report ==
=== Pre-event ===
Prior to the beginning of the competition, Mexican sports newspaper Esto reported that reigning champion Alejandra Valencia expressed doubts that she would retain her title to become the first back-to-back Pan American female individual archery champion. Valencia stated instead that her target was simply to perform well and beat her own personal records. In preparation for the Games, the Mexican archery squad had pitted the women's team of Valencia, Aída Román and Karla Hinojosa against the men's team of Juan René Serrano, Luis Álvarez and Ernesto Boardman and held practice rounds in the rain. Román, who had been named by Mexican news agency Notimex as the world's best archer of 2014, aimed to improve on her bronze medal achievement in Guadalajara four years earlier.

=== Ranking round ===
The event commenced with the ranking round on the morning of 14 July amid spells of light rain and gusts of wind. Alejandra Valencia topped the ranking round for the second Pan American Games in a row, heading the table on 655 points. Fellow Mexican Aída Román finished in second with an identical score of 655 points, but was seeded second after shooting one fewer arrow inside the central 10 ring. Khatuna Lorig and Karla Hinojosa both tied on 651 points to rank third and fourth respectively.

Kateri Vrakking was the highest scoring Canadian archer, finishing with the 14th seed on 612 points. Vrakking's teammates Georcy-Stéphanie Picard and Virginie Chenier were not far behind, ending the round 15th and 18th respectively and setting up an all-Canadian tie in the first elimination round. Vrakking expressed satisfaction with her performance, stating she was feeling confident ahead of the knock-out rounds after finding her rhythm. She added that she was unperturbed by the intermittent drizzle or the home crowd in attendance, which Justin Skinner of the Toronto newspaper The City Centre Mirror described as "sizeable" despite the weather.

=== Elimination rounds ===
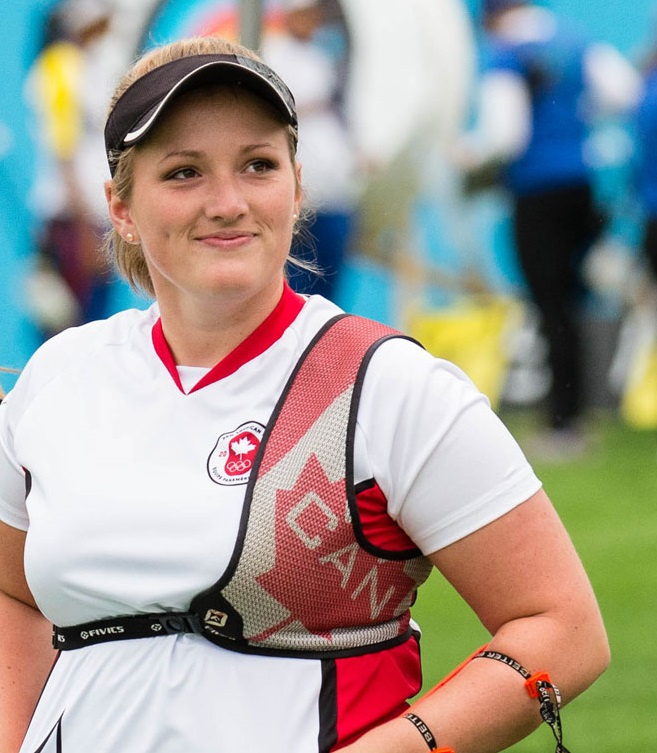
Canada's Georcy-Stéphanie Picard was eliminated in the 1/8 round by Aída Román of Mexico.

Cool and windy conditions continued into the morning of 15 July, which proved challenging for many of the archers. Khatuna Lorig began by defeating Elena Abullerade in the opening round, ending El Salvador's participation in the event. Argentina's trio of Ximena Mendiberry, Fernanda Faisal, and Florencia Lenhold Juárez were all also eliminated in the first round. In the all-Canadian affair between Picard and Chenier, Picard came back from two sets down to force and ultimately win the subsequent one-arrow shoot-off, placing her arrow in the 8-ring to Chenier's attempt in the 7-ring. As the two both belonged to the same archery club and shared the same coach, Chenier described the match as "like training, but with a little more people and more nervousness". Despite her loss, Chenier expressed satisfaction with her shooting, and the pair's coach Sylvain Cadieux praised their performances, saying they each knew what to expect from one another and that he was pleased that the match came down to a shoot-off.

The 1/8 elimination round, the second knock-out round of the competition, began with top seed Valencia losing in five sets to Colombia's Maira Sepúlveda, who finished 16th in the ranking round, while Valencia's Mexican teammates Román and Hinojoa defeated Picard and Sarah Nikitin of Brazil respectively to advance to the quarter-finals. Picard said afterwards that she felt she had played better than in her earlier match against Chenier, but was unable to fully master the gusts of winds that pushed her arrows towards the right, bowing out of the tournament to Román in straight sets. Román admitted that it took time for her to adapt to the 14 °C air temperature, but was able to play her best towards the end of the day's session, which concluded with the quarter-finals at 11am. Román defeated Cuba's Maydenia Sarduy to progress to the semi-finals to face Khatuna Lorig, while Hinojosa beat Colombia's Natalia Sanchez to face off against Sanchez's compatriot Ana Rendón in the other last four contest, a result that exceeded her own expectations.

The final rounds of the competition began three days later on the morning of 18 July with the two semi-final matches. In the first match Rendón was too strong for Hinojosa, the Mexican failing to land an arrow in the target's central 10 ring as the Colombian won in straight sets to advance to the final. She was joined in the gold medal match by Lorig, whose match with Román was a tight affair which necessitated a one-arrow shoot-off after the two could not be split after five sets. Lorig's winning shot was determined to be closer to the centre of the target by a matter of centimetres and was thus declared the winner. Notimex described the result as a "bitter déjà vu" for Román, who had experienced a loss in similar circumstances in the final of the women's individual event at the 2012 Summer Olympics against South Korea's Ki Bo-bae, in which Román finished with the silver medal.

=== Medal matches ===
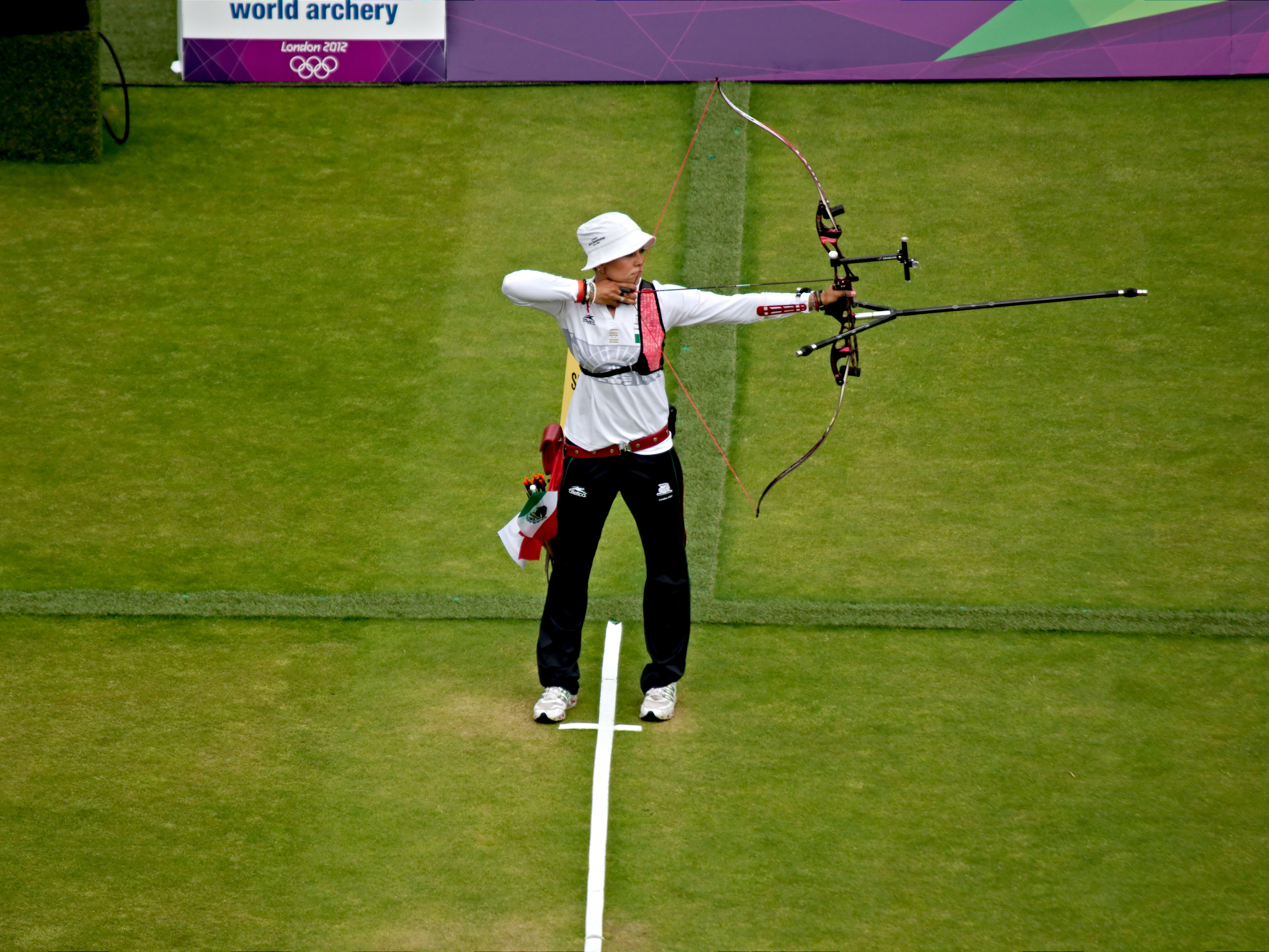
Aída Román (pictured in 2012) finished fourth after losing in the bronze medal match.

The matches determining the medal winners commenced immediately after the semi-final encounters. As the two losing archers from the semi-finals, Hinojosa and Román met to decide the bronze medal match. Hinojosa's win over Román in five sets was considered a surprise by Notimex, and Esto characterised the encounter as an apprentice winning against a master in their report of the match, highlighting that Hinojosa on her Pan American Games debut overcame her vastly more experienced and Olympic medalist teammate. In an interview following the match Hinojosa dedicated her bronze medal victory to her parents and her friends and set her sights on securing a spot for the 2015 World Archery Championships. She also expressed her admiration for Román, stating that defeating Román gave her motivation to put in more effort, "because Aída will never give up."

In the gold medal final Lorig won comfortably over Rendón, earning the United States their first and only archery title at the 2015 Games. Nick Butler of Inside the Games called her win "the biggest of her illustrious career", which came on a day that saw a flurry of gold medals for the United States and helped them topple Canada from the head of the Pan American Games medal table. Rendon's silver medal was the eighth achieved by Colombia at the 2015 Pan American Games and her second after her gold medal victory in the women's team event.

== Results ==
=== Ranking round ===
Rank	Archer	Half		Score	10s	Xs
Rank	Archer	1st	2nd	Score	10s	Xs
1	Alejandra Valencia (MEX)	323	332	655	26	6
2	Aída Román (MEX)	324	331	655	25	3
3	Khatuna Lorig (USA)	330	321	651	24	6
4	Karla Hinojosa (MEX)	316	335	651	21	7
5	Natalia Sánchez (COL)	320	326	646	21	5
6	Ariel Gibilaro (USA)	318	328	646	21	4
7	Leidys Brito (VEN)	324	315	639	19	4
8	Ane Marcelle Dos Santos (BRA)	314	316	630	21	10
9	Ana Rendón (COL)	317	313	630	17	9
10	Maydenia Sarduy (CUB)	313	317	630	14	5
11	La Nola Pritchard (USA)	307	316	623	18	5
12	Larissa Feitosa (BRA)	309	310	619	13	1
13	Sarah Nikitin (BRA)	311	307	618	19	4
14	Kateri Vrakking (CAN)	309	303	612	12	3
15	Georcy-Stéphanie Picard (CAN)	299	310	609	12	2
16	Maira Sepúlveda (COL)	305	296	601	11	2
17	Ximena Mendiberry (ARG)	299	301	600	15	3
18	Virginie Chenier (CAN)	293	307	600	12	3
19	Elizabeth Rodríguez (CUB)	306	291	597	14	1
20	Verona Villegas (VEN)	299	295	594	8	1
21	Yesenia Valencia (GUA)	300	291	591	7	5
22	Mayra Méndez (VEN)	293	297	590	7	5
23	Tania Maldonado (CHI)	311	276	587	15	6
24	Ignacia Márquez (CHI)	300	285	585	6	1
25	Lorisglenis Ojea (CUB)	282	299	581	11	3
26	Gloriana Bermúdez Moreno (CRC)	295	284	579	11	3
27	Florencia Leithold Juarez (ARG)	285	292	577	10	3
28	Fernanda Faisal (ARG)	279	286	565	6	2
29	Keiko Chang (CHI)	299	265	564	5	1
30	Elena Abullarade (ESA)	274	289	563	12	2
31	Yessica Camilo (DOM)	273	262	535	9	3
32	Crismery García (DOM)	251	240	491	4	1

=== Elimination rounds ===
==== Top half ====
1/16 elimination
1	A Valencia (MEX)	6
32	C Garcia (DOM)	0
17	X Mendiberry (ARG)	3
16	M Sepúlveda (COL)	7
9	A Rendón (COL)	6
12	I Marquez (CHI)	2
25	L Ojea (CUB)	1
8	AM Dos Santos (BRA)	7
5	N Sánchez (COL)	6
28	F Faisal (ARG)	0
21	Y Valencia (GUA)	4
12	L Feitosa (BRA)	6
13	S Nikitin (BRA)	6
20	V Villegas (VEN)	0
29	K Chang (CHI)	2
4	K Hinojosa (MEX)	6

1/8 elimination
1	A Valencia (MEX)	4
16	M Sepúlveda (COL)	6
9	A Rendón (COL)	6
8	AM Dos Santos (BRA)	2
5	N Sánchez (COL)	6
12	L Feitosa (BRA)	0
13	S Nikitin (BRA)	2
4	K Hinojosa (MEX)	6

Quarter-finals
16	M Sepúlveda (COL)	2
9	A Rendón (COL)	6
5	N Sánchez (COL)	5
4	K Hinojosa (MEX)	6*

Semifinals
9	A Rendón (COL)	6
4	K Hinojosa (MEX)	0

==== Bottom half ====
1/16 elimination
3	K Lorig (USA)	6
30	E Abullarade (ESA)	2
19	E Rodriguez (CUB)	5
14	K Vrakking (CAN)	6*
11	LN Pritchard (USA)	7
22	M Méndez (VEN)	1
27	F Leithold Juarez (ARG)	4
6	A Gibilaro (USA)	6
7	L Brito (VEN)	6
26	G Bermudez Moreno (CRC)	2
23	T Maldonado (CHI)	1
10	M Sarduy (CUB)	7
15	G-S Thiffeault Picard (CAN)	6*
18	V Chenier (CAN)	5
31	Y Camilo (DOM)	0
2	A Román (MEX)	6

1/8 elimination
3	K Lorig (USA)	6*
14	K Vrakking (CAN)	5
11	LN Pritchard (USA)	7
6	A Gibilaro (USA)	1
7	L Brito (VEN)	5
10	M Sarduy (CUB)	6*
15	G-S Thiffeault Picard (CAN)	0
2	A Román (MEX)	6

Quarter-finals
3	K Lorig (USA)	7
11	LN Pritchard (USA)	3
10	M Sarduy (CUB)	3
2	A Román (MEX)	7

Semifinals
3	K Lorig (USA)	6*
2	A Román (MEX)	5

Note: An asterisk (*) denotes a win from a one-arrow shoot-off

=== Finals ===
Semifinals
9	Ana Rendón (COL)	6	30	28	29
4	Karla Hinojosa (MEX)	0	26	27	24
3	Khatuna Lorig (USA)	6*	26	27	27	25	27
2	Aída Román (MEX)	5	25	26	28	27	27

Finals
9	Ana Rendón (COL) (silver)	2	26	26	28	25
3	Khatuna Lorig (USA) (gold)	6	27	27	24	26
Third place
4	Karla Hinojosa (MEX) (bronze)	6	26	27	27	28	27
2	Aída Román (MEX)	4	29	24	27	28	26

Note: An asterisk (*) denotes a win from a one-arrow shoot-off

== See also ==
- Archery at the 2014 Asian Games – Women's individual recurve
- Archery at the 2015 European Games – Women's individual
- Archery at the 2016 Summer Olympics – Women's individual
