= Archery at the 2011 Pan American Games – Men's team =

Archery – Men's team at the 2011 Pan American Games
- Venue: Pan American Archery Stadium
- Dates: October 17 – 21
- Competitors: 27 from 9 nations

Medalists
Gold medal	Joe Fanchin; Brady Ellison; Jake Kaminski	United States
Silver medal	Juan René Serrano; Eduardo Vélez; Pedro Vivas	Mexico
Bronze medal	Juan Carlos Stevens; Hugo Franco; Jaime Quintana	Cuba

The men's team archery event at the 2011 Pan American Games was held between October 17–21 at the Pan American Archery Stadium in Guadalajara. The defending Pan American Games champion was Brady Ellison, Butch Johnson and Vic Wunderle of the United States.

== Schedule ==
All times are Central Standard Time (UTC-6).

Date	Time	Round
October 17, 2011	10:30	Qualification
October 18, 2011	10:30	Qualification
October 21, 2011	10:00	Quarterfinals
October 21, 2011	12:00	Semifinals
October 21, 2011	13:36	Final

== Results ==
=== Qualification ===
27 competitors from 9 nations competed.

Rank	Country		Total
Rank	Competitor	Score	Total
1	United States		3985 PR
1	Joe Fanchin	1324	3985 PR
1	Brady Ellison	1356	3985 PR
1	Jake Kaminski	1305	3985 PR
2	Mexico		3939
2	Juan René Serrano	1325	3939
2	Eduardo Vélez	1300	3939
2	Pedro Vivas	1314	3939
3	Canada		3909
3	Crispin Duenas	1337	3909
3	Jason Lyon	1321	3909
3	Patrick Rivest-Bunster	1251	3909
4	Cuba		3868
4	Juan Carlos Stevens	1323	3868
4	Hugo Franco	1284	3868
4	Jaime Quintana	1261	3868
5	Brazil		3830
5	Xavier Rezende	1300	3830
5	Fabio Emilio	1239	3830
5	Luiz Trainini	1291	3830
6	Colombia		3819
6	Daniel Pacheco	1224	3819
6	Daniel Pineda	1333	3819
6	Diego Torres	1291	3819
7	Venezuela		3753
7	Elias Malave	1310	3753
7	Manuel Diaz	1242	3753
7	David Vilchez	1201	3753
8	El Salvador		3696
8	Oscar Ticas	1267	3696
8	Miguel Veliz	1271	3696
8	Cristobal Merlos	1158	3696
9	Ecuador		3527
9	Diego Ramos	1091	3527
9	Kevin Vargas	1248	3527
9	Martin Lazo	1188	3527

=== Elimination rounds ===
First Round
9	Ecuador	196
8	El Salvador	218

Quarterfinals
1	United States	224
8	El Salvador	220
5	Brazil	211
4	Cuba	218
3	Canada	211
6	Colombia	210
7	Venezuela	208
2	Mexico	212

Semifinals
1	United States	227 PR
4	Cuba	215
3	Canada	218
2	Mexico	220

Finals
1	United States	220
2	Mexico	210
Third place
3	Canada	204
4	Cuba	217
