= Archery at the 2018 Central American and Caribbean Games =

- Venue: Estadio Lulio Gonzalez
- Location: (Colombia) Barranquilla
- Dates: 29 July – 3 August

The archery competition at the 2018 Central American and Caribbean Games was held in Barranquilla, Colombia from 29 July to 3 August at the Estadio Lulio González.

== Medal summary ==
=== Men's events ===
Event	Gold	Silver	Bronze
Individual Compound	Roberto Hernández (ESA)	Camilo Cardona (COL)	Antonio Hidalgo (MEX)
Team Compound	Mexico (MEX); Romeo Treviño; Antonio Hidalgo; Miguel Becerra	El Salvador (ESA); Miguel Veliz; Gerardo Rivas; Roberto Hernández	Colombia (COL); Daniel Muñoz; Camilo Cardona; Sebastián Arenas
Individual Recurve	Luis Álvarez (MEX)	Daniel Betancur (COL)	Andrés Pila (COL)
Team Recurve	Colombia (COL); Daniel Pineda; Andrés Pila; Daniel Betancur	Mexico (MEX); Jorge Nevarez; Ernesto Boardman; Luis Álvarez	Cuba (CUB); Juan Carlos Stevens; Adrián Puentes; Hugo Franco

=== Women's events ===
Event	Gold	Silver	Bronze
Individual Compound	Sara López (COL)	Andrea Becerra (MEX)	Linda Ochoa (MEX)
Team Compound	Mexico (MEX); Esmeralda Sanchez; Linda Ochoa; Andrea Becerra	Colombia (COL); Nora Valdez; Alejandra Usquiano; Sara López	El Salvador (ESA); Andrea Orellana; Rebeca Lopez; Paola Corado
Individual Recurve	Alejandra Valencia (MEX)	Ana Paula Vázquez (MEX)	Aída Román (MEX)
Team Recurve	Mexico (MEX); Ana Paula Vázquez; Alejandra Valencia; Aída Román	Colombia (COL); Maira Sepúlveda; Ana Rendón; Valentina Contreras	Cuba (CUB); Maydenia Sarduy; Elizabeth Rodriguez; Karla Fals

=== Mixed events ===
Event	Gold	Silver	Bronze
Team Compound	Guatemala (GUA); Sofía Paiz; Jose Del Cid	Puerto Rico (PUR); Marla Cintron; Bryan Alvarado	Mexico (MEX); Linda Ochoa; Antonio Hidalgo
Team Recurve	Mexico (MEX); Alejandra Valencia; Ernesto Boardman	Cuba (CUB); Maydenia Sarduy; Adrián Puentes	Colombia (COL); Ana Rendón; Daniel Pineda

== Medal table ==
* Host nation (Host)

Rank	Nation	Gold	Silver	Bronze	Total
1	Mexico	6	3	4	13
2	Colombia*	2	4	3	9
3	El Salvador	1	1	1	3
4	Guatemala	1	0	0	1
5	Cuba	0	1	2	3
6	Puerto Rico	0	1	0	1
Totals (6 entries)		10	10	10	30
