= Archery at the 2008 Summer Olympics – Men's team =

Men's team at the Games of the XXIX Olympiad
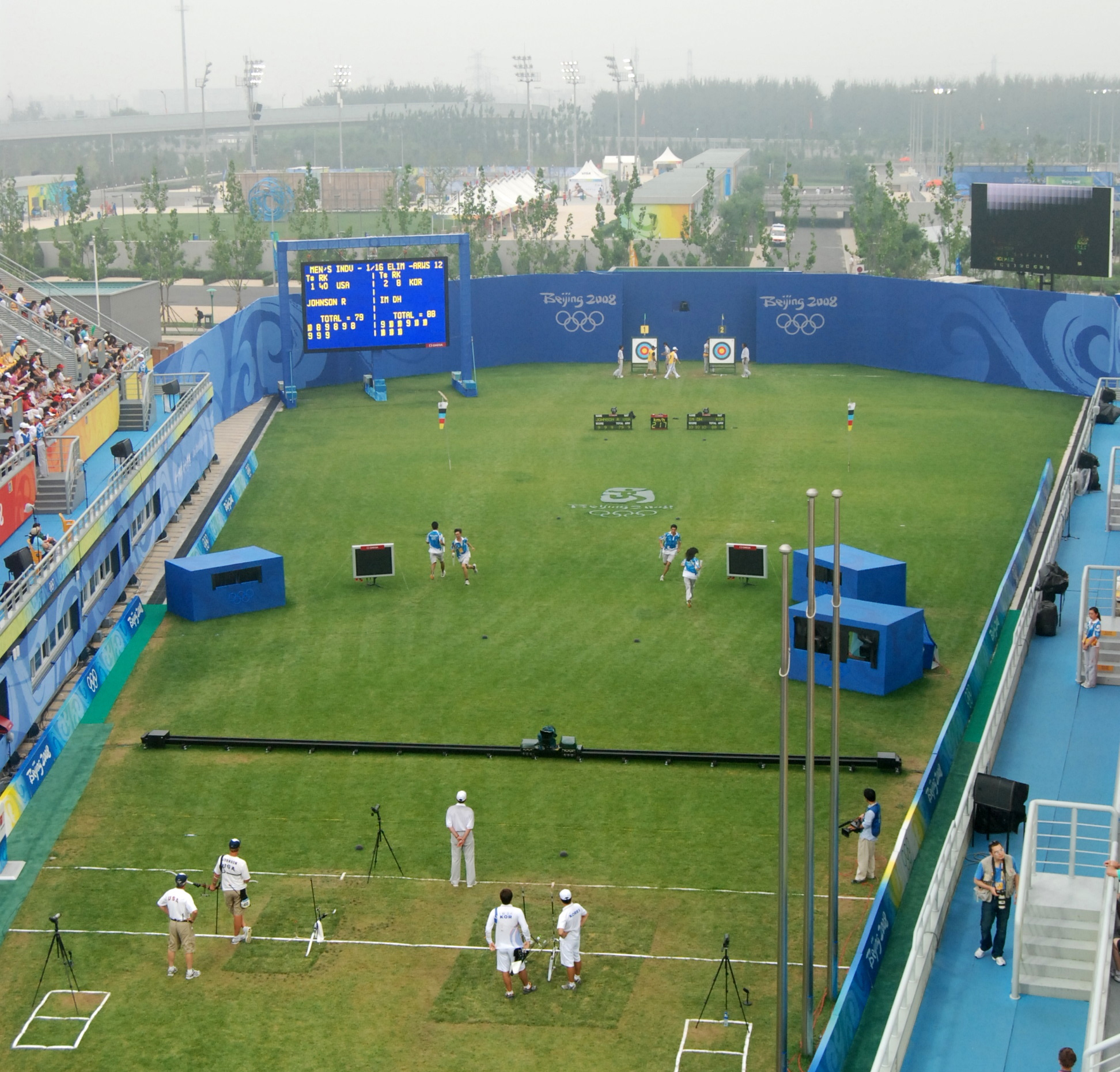
- The Olympic Green Archery Field, where the event took place, during the 2008 Summer Olympics.
- Venue: Olympic Green Archery Field
- Dates: 9–11 August 2008
- Competitors: 36 from 12 nations
- Winning score: 227

Medalists
1st place, gold medalist(s)		Im Dong-Hyun; Lee Chang-Hwan; Park Kyung-Mo	South Korea
2nd place, silver medalist(s)		Ilario Di Buò; Mauro Nespoli; Marco Galiazzo	Italy
3rd place, bronze medalist(s)		Xue Haifeng; Jiang Lin; Li Wenquan	China

The men's team archery event at the 2008 Summer Olympics was part of the archery programme and took place at the Olympic Green Archery Field. Ranking Round was scheduled for August 9 and elimination rounds and Finals took place on August 11. All archery is done at a range of 70 metres, with targets 1.22 metres in diameter.

As the defending Olympic champions, South Korea defended the title with two archers from the past Games, Im Dong-Hyun and Park Kyung-Mo. Chinese Taipei, silver at the last Games, participated at the event with only one Athens medalist, Wang Cheng Pang. Ukraine, bronze in Athens, brought Viktor Ruban and Oleksandr Serdyuk back at the Games.

12 teams qualified for the event at the Beijing Olympics: host China, plus the top 8 teams at the 44th Outdoor Archery World championship, held in Leipzig, Germany, and 3 other NOCs that qualified three athletes for the Games.

The competition begins with the same ranking round used to determine the individual event seeding. Each archer fires 72 arrows, with the scores of the team's three members summed to give the team score. The elimination rounds use a single-elimination tournament, with fixed brackets based on the ranking round seeding. Highly ranked teams get byes through to the quarterfinals. In each round of elimination, the two teams each fire 24 arrows (with each individual archer accounting for 8 of them). The higher scoring team moves on, while the lower scoring team is eliminated. The two semifinal losers face off for the bronze medal.

== Records ==
Prior to this competition, the existing world and Olympic records were as follows. The change from the prior 27 arrow match to a 24 arrow match for the XXIX Olympiad meant that there was no standing Olympic record in the team match.

- 216 arrow ranking round

World record	South Korea; Im Dong-Hyun, Park Kyung-Mo, Lee Chang-hwan	2039	Antalya, Turkey	28 May 2008
Olympic record	South Korea; Jang Yong-Ho, Kim Bo-Ram, Oh Kyo-Moon	2031	Atlanta, United States	1 July 1996

- 24 arrow match

World record	South Korea; Im Dong-Hyun, Kim Yeon-Chul, Lee Chang-hwan	231	Leipzig, Germany	14 July 2008
Olympic record	New record classification	–	–	–

The following new world and Olympic records were set during this competition.

Date	Record	Round	Name	Nationality	Score	OR	WR
11 August	24 arrow match	First Round	Rafał Dobrowolski; Piotr Piątek; Jacek Proć	Poland	223	OR	
11 August	24 arrow match	Quarterfinal	Im Dong-Hyun; Lee Chang-Hwan; Park Kyung-Mo	South Korea	224	OR	
11 August	24 arrow match	Final	Im Dong-Hyun; Lee Chang-Hwan; Park Kyung-Mo	South Korea	227	OR	

== World Rankings Entering Olympics ==
Rank	Team
1	Chinese Taipei
2	Italy
3	South Korea
4	Malaysia
7	Russia
8	Great Britain
9	United States
12	Australia
14	Poland
15	China
17	Ukraine
20	Canada

== Ranking Round ==
Rank	Team	1st Half	2nd Half	10s	Xs	Score
1	South Korea					2015
1	Im Dong-Hyun	335	335	33	9	670
1	Lee Chang-Hwan	333	336	30	11	669
1	Park Kyung-Mo	335	341	36	14	676
2	Ukraine					1997
2	Markiyan Ivashko	329	329	23	6	658
2	Viktor Ruban	341	337	34	8	678
2	Oleksandr Serdyuk	331	330	28	11	676
3	Malaysia					1993
3	Cheng Chu Sian	329	331	27	10	660
3	Khalmizam Wan Abd Aziz	333	341	31	9	674
3	Muhammad Marbawi Sulaiman	327	332	29	8	659
4	Russia					1989
4	Andrey Abramov	330	330	28	11	660
4	Bair Badënov	329	329	24	5	658
4	Balzhinima Tsyrempilov	339	332	38	12	671
5	Great Britain					1988
5	Laurence Godfrey	324	333	22	3	657
5	Simon Terry	330	340	35	13	670
5	Alan Wills	335	326	28	9	661
6	Italy					1986
6	Ilario Di Buò	333	337	30	9	670
6	Marco Galiazzo	329	338	31	12	667
6	Mauro Nespoli	328	321	23	5	649
7	Chinese Taipei					1980
7	Chen Szu-Yuan	323	331	25	4	667
7	Kuo Cheng Wei	323	336	24	6	659
7	Wang Cheng Pang	331	336	32	9	654
8	Poland					1977
8	Rafał Dobrowolski	330	337	31	8	667
8	Piotr Piątek	327	322	26	7	649
8	Jacek Proć	333	328	31	5	661
9	Australia					1977
9	Matthew Gray	325	329	20	3	654
9	Sky Kim	333	332	25	4	665
9	Michael Naray	328	330	29	8	658
10	United States					1969
10	Brady Ellison	328	336	32	11	664
10	Richard Johnson	326	327	21	5	653
10	Victor Wunderle	318	334	27	8	652
11	Canada					1954
11	John-David Burnes	320	324	22	4	644
11	Crispin Duenas	333	331	29	8	664
11	Jason Lyon	322	324	24	7	646
12	China					1941
12	Jiang Lin	320	312	16	2	632
12	Li Wenquan	319	327	25	10	646
12	Xue Haifeng	334	329	29	9	663

== Elimination round ==
First Round
8	Poland	223
9	Australia	218
5	Great Britain	210
12	China	214
11	Canada	217
6	Italy	219
7	Chinese Taipei	222
10	United States	218

Quarterfinals
1	South Korea	224
8	Poland	222
12	China	217
4	Russia	209
3	Malaysia	213
6	Italy	218
7	Chinese Taipei	211
2	Ukraine	214

Semifinals
1	South Korea	221
12	China	218
6	Italy	223
2	Ukraine	221

Finals
1	South Korea	227
6	Italy	225
Third place
12	China	222
2	Ukraine	219

== Final Match Details ==
Rank	Team Athletes	End	Arrows			Score
	South Korea	24-Match Total				227
	Lee Chang-Hwan; Im Dong-Hyun; Park Kyung-Mo	1	10	10	10	30
	Lee Chang-Hwan; Im Dong-Hyun; Park Kyung-Mo	1	10	10	8	28
	Lee Chang-Hwan; Im Dong-Hyun; Park Kyung-Mo	2	10	10	10	30
	Lee Chang-Hwan; Im Dong-Hyun; Park Kyung-Mo	2	9	10	10	29
	Lee Chang-Hwan; Im Dong-Hyun; Park Kyung-Mo	3	9	9	9	27
	Lee Chang-Hwan; Im Dong-Hyun; Park Kyung-Mo	3	9	9	10	28
	Lee Chang-Hwan; Im Dong-Hyun; Park Kyung-Mo	4	9	9	9	27
	Lee Chang-Hwan; Im Dong-Hyun; Park Kyung-Mo	4	9	10	9	28
	Italy	24-Match Total				225
	Mauro Nespoli; Ilario Di Buò; Marco Galiazzo	1	10	10	7	27
	Mauro Nespoli; Ilario Di Buò; Marco Galiazzo	1	10	10	9	29
	Mauro Nespoli; Ilario Di Buò; Marco Galiazzo	2	9	8	10	27
	Mauro Nespoli; Ilario Di Buò; Marco Galiazzo	2	10	9	9	28
	Mauro Nespoli; Ilario Di Buò; Marco Galiazzo	3	10	9	10	29
	Mauro Nespoli; Ilario Di Buò; Marco Galiazzo	3	10	10	10	30
	Mauro Nespoli; Ilario Di Buò; Marco Galiazzo	4	9	10	10	29
	Mauro Nespoli; Ilario Di Buò; Marco Galiazzo	4	9	10	7	26
