= Archery at the 2015 Pan American Games =

- Archery pictogram for the Games
- Venue: Varsity Stadium
- Dates: July 14–18
- No. of events: 4 (2 men, 2 women)
- Competitors: 64 from 15 nations

Archery competitions at the 2015 Pan American Games in Toronto was held from July 14 to 18 at Varsity Stadium. Just like in the Olympics, the archery competition was conducted using the recurve bow. A total of four archery events were held: two each for men and women.

The 2015 World Archery Championships were scheduled for later in July, to not conflict with the games.

== Venue ==
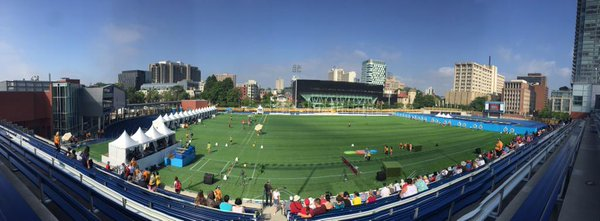
The Varsity Stadium, in Toronto, was the venue for the archery competitions

The competitions took place at the Varsity Stadium, located on the downtown campus of the University of Toronto. The facility is about five kilometers from the athletes village. The stadium will have a capacity of 2,000 people per session.

== Competition schedule ==
The following is the competition schedule for the archery competitions:

Q	Qualifications	R32	Round of 32	R16	Round of 16	¼	Quarterfinals	½	Semifinals	B	Bronze medal match	F	Final

Event↓/Date →	Tue 14	Wed 15			Thu 16			Fri 17				Sat 18		
Men's individual	Q				R32	R16	¼					½	B	F
Men's team	Q							¼	½	B	F			
Women's individual	Q	R32	R16	¼								½	B	F
Women's team	Q							¼	½	B	F			

== Medal table ==
* Host nation (Canada)

Rank	Nation	Gold	Silver	Bronze	Total
1	Mexico	2	1	1	4
2	United States	1	2	1	4
3	Colombia	1	1	0	2
4	Brazil	0	0	1	1
4	Canada*	0	0	1	1
Totals (5 entries)		4	4	4	12

== Medalists ==
Event	Gold	Silver	Bronze
Men's individual	Luis Álvarez; Mexico	Brady Ellison; United States	Jason Lyon; Canada
Men's team	Mexico; Juan René Serrano; Ernesto Horacio Boardman; Luis Álvarez	United States; Zach Garrett; Brady Ellison; Collin Klimitchek	Brazil; Marcus Vinicius D'Almeida; Bernardo Oliveira; Daniel Xavier
Women's individual	Khatuna Lorig; United States	Ana Rendón; Colombia	Karla Hinojosa; Mexico
Women's team	Colombia; Ana Rendón; Natalia Sánchez; Maira Sepúlveda	Mexico; Karla Hinojosa; Aída Román; Alejandra Valencia	United States; Ariel Gibilaro; Khatuna Lorig; La Nola Pritchard

== Participating nations ==
A total of 15 countries have qualified athletes. The number of athletes a nation has entered is in parentheses beside the name of the country.

- Argentina (5)
- Brazil (6)
- Canada (6)
- Chile (6)
- Colombia (6)
- Costa Rica (1)
- Cuba (6)
- Dominican Republic (4)
- Ecuador (1)
- El Salvador (2)
- Guatemala (3)
- Mexico (6)
- Puerto Rico (2)
- United States (6)
- Venezuela (4)

== Qualification ==
A total of 64 archers (32 per gender) qualified to compete at the games. There was three qualification tournaments for countries to qualify their athletes. A nation may enter only three athletes per gender. If a nation does qualify the maximum number of athletes, it will also qualify for the team event in the respective gender.

== See also ==
- Archery at the 2016 Summer Olympics
