= Archery at the 2011 Pan American Games =

- Venue: Pan American Archery Stadium
- Dates: October 17 - October 22
- Competitors: 64 from 14 nations

Archery at the 2011 Pan American Games was held over a six-day period from October 17 to October 22. The events took place at the newly built Pan American Archery Stadium in Guadalajara, Mexico. Just like in the Olympics, the archery competition will be held using the recurve bow.

== Medal summary ==
=== Medal table ===
* Host nation (Mexico)

Rank	Nation	Gold	Silver	Bronze	Total
1	United States	2	2	0	4
2	Mexico*	2	1	1	4
3	Canada	0	1	0	1
4	Cuba	0	0	2	2
5	Colombia	0	0	1	1
Totals (5 entries)		4	4	4	12

=== Events ===
Event	Gold	Silver	Bronze
Men's individual	Brady Ellison; United States	Crispin Duenas; Canada	Daniel Pineda; Colombia
Women's individual	Alejandra Valencia; Mexico	Miranda Leek; United States	Aída Román; Mexico
Men's team	United States; Joe Fanchin; Brady Ellison; Jake Kaminski	Mexico; Juan René Serrano; Eduardo Vélez; Pedro Vivas	Cuba; Juan Carlos Stevens; Hugo Franco; Jaime Quintana
Women's team	Mexico; Aída Román; Alejandra Valencia; Mariana Avitia	United States; Khatuna Lorig; Miranda Leek; Heather Koehl	Cuba; Maydenia Sarduy; Orquidea Quesada; Larissa Pagán

== Schedule ==
All times are Central Daylight Time (UTC-5).

Day	Date	Start	Finish	Event	Phase
Day 4	Monday October 17, 2011	9:30	12:45	Women's individual	Qualification
Day 4	Monday October 17, 2011	9:30	12:45	Men's individual	Qualification
Day 5	Tuesday October 18, 2011	9:30	12:45	Women's individual	Qualification
Day 5	Tuesday October 18, 2011	9:30	12:45	Men's individual	Qualification
Day 6	Wednesday October 19, 2011	9:00	11:50	Women's individual	Eliminations/Quarterfinals
Day 7	Thursday October 20, 2011	9:00	11:50	Men's individual	Eliminations/Quarterfinals
Day 8	Friday October 21, 2011	10:00	13:50	Women's team	Eliminations/Medal round
Day 8	Friday October 21, 2011	10:00	13:50	Men's team	Eliminations/Medal round
Day 9	Saturday October 22, 2011	10:00	12:14	Women's individual	Semi finals/Medal round
Day 9	Saturday October 22, 2011	10:00	12:14	Men's individual	Semi finals/Medal round

== Qualification ==
The athlete quota for archery is 64 athletes, 32 men and 32 women. There is a maximum of six athletes per National Olympic Committee, three per gender. NOC's with three athletes of the same gender automatically qualify for the team competition. There will be 2 qualification tournaments for each gender to qualify athletes.

Nation	Men's Individual	Men's Team	Women's Individual	Women's Team	Total
Argentina	1		3	X	4
Brazil	3	X	3	X	6
Canada	3	X	3	X	6
Chile	2		3	X	5
Colombia	3	X	3	X	6
Cuba	3	X	3	X	6
Dominican Republic			1		1
Ecuador	3	X	1		3
El Salvador	3	X			3
Guatemala	1				1
Mexico	3	X	3	X	6
Puerto Rico	1		3	X	4
United States	3	X	3	X	6
Venezuela	3	X	3	X	6
Total athletes	32	27	32	30	64
Total NOCs	13	9	12	10	14

== See also ==
- Archery at the 2012 Summer Olympics
