= Sarduy =

Sarduy is a surname. Notable people with the surname include:

- Maydenia Sarduy (born 1984), Cuban archer
- Severo Sarduy (1937–1993), Cuban poet, writer, playwright, and critic
- Rafael A. Sarduy (1969) Mia. FL. Fine artist, poet, Tattoo Artist.
