= Archery at the 2019 Pan American Games – Women's team recurve =

Women's team recurve at the 2019 Pan American Games
- Venue: Villa Maria de Triunfo
- Dates: August 7–11
- Competitors: 24 from 8 nations

Medalists
| Gold medal | Casey Kaufhold; Khatuna Lorig; Erin Mickelberry; United States |
| Silver medal | Mariana Avitia; Aída Román; Alejandra Valencia; Mexico |
| Bronze medal | Valentina Acosta; Ana Rendón; Maira Sepúlveda; Colombia |

The women's team recurve competition of the archery events at the 2019 Pan American Games was held from 7 August to 11 August at the Archery field at the Villa Maria de Triunfo in Lima, Peru.

== Schedule ==
| Date | Time | Round |
|---|---|---|
| August 7, 2019 | 11:30 | Ranking round |
| August 7, 2019 | 16:00 | Quarterfinals |
| August 7, 2019 | 16:30 | Semifinals |
| August 11, 2019 | 9:44 | Finals |

== Results ==
=== Ranking round ===
The results were as follows:

| Rank | Nation | Archers | Score | Total | Notes |
|---|---|---|---|---|---|
| 1 | Mexico | Mariana Avitia; Aída Román; Alejandra Valencia | 643; 653; 675 | 1971 | PR |
| 2 | United States | Casey Kaufhold; Khatuna Lorig; Erin Mickelberry | 662; 642; 636 | 1940 | |
| 3 | Colombia | Valentina Acosta; Ana Rendón; Maira Sepúlveda | 625; 652; 586 | 1863 | |
| 4 | Canada | Stephanie Barrett; Virginie Chénier; Mariessa Pinto | 641; 613; 606 | 1860 | |
| 5 | Brazil | Ane Marcelle dos Santos; Graziela Paulino dos Santos; Ana Sliatchicas Caetano | 629; 608; 610 | 1847 | |
| 6 | Cuba | Karla Fals; Elizabeth Rodriguez; Maydenia Sarduy | 582; 635; 609 | 1826 | |
| 7 | Chile | Javiera Andrades; Isabella Bassi; Catalina Marquez | 561; 629; 592 | 1782 | |
| 8 | Bolivia | Dahara Claros; Ana Micaela Espinoza; Ebe Fernandez | 537; 520; 592 | 1649 | |

=== Elimination rounds ===
The results were as follows:

Quarterfinals
1 | Mexico | 6 | 55 | 53 | 55
8 | Bolivia | 0 | 44 | 41 | 46
5 | Brazil | 6 | 49 | 54 | 47
4 | Canada | 0 | 45 | 52 | 41
3 | Colombia | 6 | 53 | 48 | 54 | 55
6 | Cuba | 2 | 48 | 51 | 52 | 50
7 | Chile | 0 | 42 | 52 | 53
2 | United States | 6 | 54 | 55 | 54

Semifinals
1 | Mexico | 6 | 57 | 55 | 55
5 | Brazil | 0 | 55 | 47 | 52
3 | Colombia | 2 | 49 | 53 | 54 | 46
2 | United States | 6 | 52 | 57 | 52 | 48

Final
1 | Mexico | 3 | 51 | 53 | 58 | 48
2 | United States | 5 | 51 | 54 | 51 | 56
Bronze medal match
5 | Brazil | 1 | 50 | 50 | 50
3 | Colombia | 5 | 50 | 55 | 55
