= Erin Mickelberry =

American archer

Personal information
- Born: April 5, 1986 (age 40)
- Height: 5 ft 7 in (170 cm)
Medal record
Women's recurve archery
Representing United States
Pan American Games
| Gold medal – first place | 2019 Lima | Team recurve |

Erin Mickelberry (born April 5, 1986) is an American archer. She won a gold medal at the 2019 Pan American Games, in Women's team recurve, and competed in Individual Recurve.

She studied at University of Washington.

She won a bronze medal at the 2013 Costa Rica Cup. She competed at the 2019 World Archery Championships in Women's team recurve.
