= Field archery at the 2005 World Games – Men's recurve =

Field archery men's recurve at the 2005 World Games
- Venue: Mülheimer Wald und MüGa-Gelände, Duisburg, Germany
- Dates: 15–17 July 2005
- Competitors: 20 from 14 nations

Medalists
gold medal	(Italy) Michele Frangilli
silver medal	(United Kingdom) Alan Wills
bronze medal	(Italy) Alvise Bertolini

The men's recurve archery competition at the 2005 World Games took place from 15 to 17 July 2005 at the Mülheimer Wald und MüGa-Gelände in Duisburg, Germany.

== Competition format ==
A total of 20 archers entered the competition. The best four athletes from preliminary round qualifies to the semifinals.

== Results ==
=== Preliminary round ===
Rank	Archer	Nation	Score	Note
1	Michele Frangilli	Italy	690	Q
2	Alan Wills	(United Kingdom) Great Britain	674	Q
3	Sebastian Rohrberg	Germany	670	Q
4	Alvise Bertolini	Italy	669	Q
5	Olivier Carreau	France	662	
6	Matija Zlender	Slovenia	661	
7	Björn Jansson	Sweden	658	
8	Gerard Koonings	Netherlands	655	
9	Yoshikazu Nito	Japan	645	
10	Jean-Michel Piquet	Belgium	640	
11	Henning Lüpkemann	Germany	640	
12	Antoine Friot	France	633	
13	Jonathan Shales	(United Kingdom) Great Britain	630	
14	Gábor Bánszki	Hungary	628	
15	Joseph McGlyn	United States	628	
16	Mats Andersson	Sweden	623	
17	Joan Valls	Spain	617	
18	Øistein Bråthen	Norway	614	
19	Huang Hsin-huai	Chinese Taipei	579	
20	George Tekmitchov	United States	577	

=== Finals ===
Semifinals
1	(Italy) Michele Frangilli	52
4	(Italy) Alvise Bertolini	48
2	(United Kingdom) Alan Wills	55
3	(Germany) Sebastian Rohrberg	53

Finals
1	(Italy) Michele Frangilli	58
2	(United Kingdom) Alan Wills	53
Third place
4	(Italy) Alvise Bertolini	57(5)
3	(Germany) Sebastian Rohrberg	57(4)
