= Li Wenquan =

Chinese archer (born 1986)

Medal record

Men's recurve archery

Representing China

Olympic Games
Bronze medal – third place	2008 Beijing	Team

Asian Championships
Silver medal – second place	2011 Tehran	Team

Li Wenquan (Chinese: 李文全; pinyin: Lǐ Wénquán; born 18 January 1986 in Guangxi) is a male archer from Gaotian village, Yangshuo County, Guilin City in the People's Republic of China.

== 2008 Summer Olympics ==
At the 2008 Summer Olympics in Beijing, Li finished his ranking round with a total of 646 points. This gave him the 46th seed for the final competition bracket in which he faced Jacek Proć in the first round. Proć won the match with 116-111 and was eventually eliminated in the third round by gold medalist Viktor Ruban.

Together with Jiang Lin and Xue Haifeng, he also took part in the team event. With his 646 score from the ranking round combined with the 632 of Jiang and the 663 of Xue the Chinese were in 12th and last position after the ranking round. However, in the first round they were too strong for the British team 214-210. They advanced to the semi-final by eliminating Russia 217-209, but lost against South Korea 221-218. In the bronze medal match China was too strong for the team from Ukraine, beating them 222-219 to claim the bronze.
