= Archery at the 2014 Central American and Caribbean Games =

- Location: Veracruz, Mexico

The archery competition at the 2014 Central American and Caribbean Games was held in Veracruz, Mexico.

The tournament was scheduled to be held from 18–23 November at the USBI Field.

== Medal summary ==
=== Men's events ===
Event	Gold	Silver	Bronze
Individual Compound	Julio Fierro (MEX)	Roberto Hernández (ESA)	Eduardo Gonzalez (VEN)
Team Compound	Mexico (MEX); Mario Cardoso; Julio Fierro; Rodolfo Gonzalez	Venezuela (VEN); Eduardo Gonzalez; Leandro Rojas; Nelson Torres	Colombia (COL); Camilo Cardona; Ronaldo Gutiérrez; Daniel Muñoz
Individual Recurve	Luis Álvarez (MEX)	Daniel Betancur (COL)	Ricardo Vasquez (VEN)
Team Recurve	Mexico (MEX); Luis Álvarez; Juan Serrano; Pedro Vivas	Colombia (COL); Daniel Betancur; Juan Bonilla; Daniel Pineda	Cuba (CUB); Hugo Franco; Jaime Quintana; Juan Stevens

=== Women's events ===
Event	Gold	Silver	Bronze
Individual Compound	Sara López (COL)	Aura Bravo (COL)	Brenda Merino (MEX)
Team Compound	Venezuela (VEN); Olga Bosch; Luzmary Guedez; Ana Mendoza	Colombia (COL); Aura Bravo; Sara López; Alejandra Usquiano	Mexico (MEX); Brenda Merino; Linda Ochoa-Anderson; Katia Rodriguez
Individual Recurve	Ana Rendón (COL)	Aída Román (MEX)	Natalia Sánchez (COL)
Team Recurve	Mexico (MEX); Gabriela Bayardo; Aída Román; Alejandra Valencia	Colombia (COL); Ana Rendón; Natalia Sánchez; Maira Sepúlveda	Cuba (CUB); Lorisglenis Ojea; Larissa Pagan; Maydenia Sarduy

=== Mixed events ===
Event	Gold	Silver	Bronze
Team Compound	Mexico (MEX); Julio Fierro; Linda Ochoa-Anderson	Colombia (COL); Sara López; Daniel Muñoz	Venezuela (VEN); Olga Bosch; Nelson Torres
Team Recurve	Colombia (COL); Daniel Pineda; Ana Rendón	Mexico (MEX); Luis Álvarez; Alejandra Valencia	Cuba (CUB); Jaime Quintana; Maydenia Sarduy

== Medal table ==
* Host nation (Mexico)

Rank	Nation	Gold	Silver	Bronze	Total
1	Mexico (MEX)*	6	2	2	10
2	Colombia (COL)	3	6	2	11
3	Venezuela (VEN)	1	1	3	5
4	El Salvador (ESA)	0	1	0	1
5	Cuba (CUB)	0	0	3	3
Totals (5 entries)		10	10	10	30
