= Archery at the 2007 Pan American Games =

The archery competitions at the 2007 Pan American Games were held on the Deodoro Military Club from July 24 to July 28, 2007.

== Athletes ==
64 athletes, 32 men and 32 women, from 14 countries will be competing for the 12 medals to be awarded.

== Competition ==
After the first elimination rounds, Women's and Men's groups were set as follows.

=== Women's individual eliminations: Group 1 ===
Round of 16 (Eliminations 1)
Jennifer Nichols (USA)	111
Judith Magras (BAR)	73
Vanessa Chacón (COL)	98
Denisse van Lamoen (CHI)	104
Kristen Niles (CAN)	96 (T8;7)
Stefania Mora (ECU)	96 (T8;6)
Ludys Tejeda (DOM)	98
Larissa Pagán (CUB)	108
Karen Scavotto (USA)	110
Yaremis Pérez (CUB)	101
Petra Ruocco (BRA)	106
Kateri Vrakking (CAN)	105
Lisbeth Leoni (VEN)	106
Sarah Nikitin (BRA)	94
Claudia Dueñas (ESA)	89
Ana Rendón (COL)	100

Round of 8 (Eliminations 1)
Jennifer Nichols (USA)	111
Denisse van Lamoen (CHI)	97
Kristen Niles (CAN)	99
Larissa Pagán (CUB)	110
Karen Scavotto (USA)	104
Petra Ruocco (BRA)	105
Lisbeth Leoni (VEN)	99
Ana Rendón (COL)	103

Quarter-finals (Eliminations 1)
Jennifer Nichols (USA)	103
Larissa Pagán (CUB)	99
Petra Ruocco (BRA)	102
Ana Rendón (COL)	104

Semi-final 1
Jennifer Nichols (USA)	106
Ana Rendón (COL)	98

=== Women's individual eliminations: Group 2 ===
Round of 16 (Eliminations 2)
Leydis Brito (VEN)	103
Norma Escalante (ESA)	89
Angela Jones (BAR)	97
Maydenia Sarduy (CUB)	103
Aída Román (MEX)	108
Fátima Rocha (BRA)	105
Liliana Burgos (CHI)	94
Lindsay Pian (USA)	103
Marie-Pier Beaudet (CAN)	104
Nadya Ruíz Negrón (PUR)	101
María Gabriela Goñi (ARG)	96
Natalia Sánchez (COL)	103
Sigrid Romero (COL)	99
Mariana Avitia (MEX)	105
Claudia Landaverde (ESA)	106
Janeth Alexandra García (MEX)	106

Round of 8 (Eliminations 2)
Leydis Brito (VEN)	107
Maydenia Sarduy (CUB)	110
Aída Román (MEX)	103
Lindsay Pian (USA)	100
Marie-Pier Beaudet (CAN)	99
Natalia Sánchez (COL)	103
Mariana Avitia (MEX)	104
Janeth Alexandra García (MEX)	107

Quarter-finals (Eliminations 2)
Maydenia Sarduy (CUB)	101
Aída Román (MEX)	104
Natalia Sánchez (COL)	110
Janeth Alexandra García (MEX)	101

Semi-final 2
Aída Román (MEX)	107
Natalia Sánchez (COL)	102

=== Women's individual finals ===
Bronze Medal
Ana Rendón (COL)	108
Natalia Sánchez (COL)	103

Gold Medal
Jennifer Nichols (USA)	107
Aída Román (MEX)	103

=== Men's individual eliminations: Group 1 ===
Round of 16 (Eliminations 1)
Eduardo Vélez (MEX)	107
Oscar Dueñas (ECU)	84
Fabio Emilio (BRA)	104
Diego Torres (COL)	114
Jorge Chapoy (MEX)	111
Miguel Mateo Pedraz (PUR)	94
Pablo Daniel Basgall (ARG)	105
Jason Lyon (CAN)	114
Juan Carlos Stevens (CUB)	107
Luis Balarezo (ECU)	94
Manuel Díaz (VEN)	103
Cristóbal Merlos (ESA)	106
Hugh MacDonald (CAN)	109
Leonardo Leoni (VEN)	102
Ariel Omar Bilbao (ARG)	102
Brady Ellison (USA)	111

Round of 8 (Eliminations 1)
Eduardo Vélez (MEX)	107
Diego Torres (COL)	103
Jorge Chapoy (MEX)	107
Jason Lyon (CAN)	115
Juan Carlos Stevens (CUB)	113
Cristóbal Merlos (ESA)	111
Hugh MacDonald (CAN)	112
Brady Ellisonn (USA)	110

Quarter-finals (Eliminations 1)
Eduardo Vélez (MEX)	112
Jason Lyon (CAN)	116
Juan Carlos Stevens (CUB)	110
Hugh MacDonald (CAN)	106

Semi-final 1
Jason Lyon (CAN)	109
Juan Carlos Stevens (CUB)	114

=== Men's individual eliminations: Group 2 ===
Round of 16 (Eliminations 2)
Butch Johnson (USA)	111
Alexander Giménez (VEN)	97
Yosei Valdés Fernández (CUB)	106
Oscar Guillén (ESA)	109
Leonardo Carvalho (BRA)	109
Christian Acosta Plaza (PUR)	106
José Joaquín Santiago (CHI)	99
Vic Wunderle (USA)	112
Juan René Serrano (MEX)	113
Luis Franco (ESA)	106
Daniel José Palena (ARG)	105
Adrián Puentes (CUB)	107
Carlos Báez Giménez (PUR)	107
Marcos Bortoloto (BRA)	103
Nino Villacreses (ECU)	96
Crispin Duenas (CAN)	111

Round of 8 (Eliminations 2)
Butch Johnson (USA)	110
Oscar Guillén (ESA)	103
Leonardo Carvalho (BRA)	110
Vic Wunderle (USA)	111
Juan René Serrano (MEX)	111
Adrián Puentes (CUB)	115
Carlos Báez Giménez (PUR)	107
Crispin Duenas (CAN)	113

Quarter-finals (Eliminations 2)
Butch Johnson (USA)	108
Vic Wunderle (USA)	115
Adrián Puentes (CUB)	111
Crispin Duenas (CAN)	107

Semi-final 2
Vic Wunderle (USA)	106
Adrián Puentes (CUB)	111

=== Men's individual finals ===
Bronze Medal
Jason Lyon (CAN)	109
Vic Wunderle (USA)	114

Gold Medal
Juan Carlos Stevens (CUB)	111
Adrián Puentes (CUB)	103

=== Men's teams ===
Round of 16
United States	N/A
-bye-	-bye-
Argentina	211
Venezuela	205
Brazil	N/A
-bye-	-bye-
-bye-	-bye-
Cuba	N/A
Canada	N/A
-bye-	-bye-
-bye-	-bye-
El Salvador	N/A
Puerto Rico	204
Ecuador	177
-bye-	-bye-
Mexico	N/A

Quarter-finals
United States	213
Argentina	192
Brazil	210
Cuba	209
Canada	224
El Salvador	190
Puerto Rico	204
Mexico	215

Semi-finals
United States	211
Brazil	204
Canada	221 (T26)
Mexico	221 (T24)

Finals
United States	218
Canada	216

Bronze medal
Brazil	208
Mexico	219

=== Women's teams ===
Quarter finals		Semi finals		Final
United States	199
El Salvador	179	United States	199
Venezuela	198	Colombia	203
Colombia	201			Colombia	201
Mexico	213			Canada	199
Cuba	207	Mexico	202
Brazil	183	Canada	203
Canada	200

Bronze medal
United States	198
Mexico	194

=== Men's events ===
Event	Gold	Silver	Bronze
Individuals	Cuba Adrian Puentes	Cuba Juan Carlos Stevens	United States Vic Wunderle
Teams	United States Brady Ellison; Butch Johnson; Vic Wunderle	Canada Crispin Duenas; Jason Lyon; Hugh MacDonald	Mexico Jorge Chapoy; Juan René Serrano; Eduardo Vélez

=== Women's events ===
Event	Gold	Silver	Bronze
Individuals	United States Jennifer Nichols	Mexico Aída Román	Colombia Ana Rendón
Teams	Colombia Ana Rendón; Sigrid Romero; Natalia Sánchez	Canada Marie-Pier Beaudet; Kristen Niles; Kateri Vrakking	United States Jennifer Nichols; Lindsey Pian; Karen Scavotto

== Medal table ==
Place	Nation	Gold medal	Silver medal	Bronze medal	Total
1	United States	2	0	2	4
2	Cuba	1	1	0	2
3	Colombia	1	0	1	2
4	Canada	0	2	0	2
5	Mexico	0	1	1	2
Total		4	4	4	12

== See also ==
- Archery at the 2008 Summer Olympics
