= Valentina Acosta Giraldo =

Colombian archer (born 2000)

Valentina Acosta
Personal information
- Full name: Valentina Acosta Giraldo
- Nationality: Colombian
- Born: 19 April 2000 (age 26)

Sport
- Country: Colombia
- Sport: Archery
- Event: Recurve
Medal record
Representing Colombia
Women's recurve archery
Pan American Games
Bronze medal – third place	2019 Lima	Team
Pan American Championships
Silver medal – second place	2021 Monterrey	Team
World Youth Championships
Gold medal – first place	2019 Madrid	Individual

Valentina Acosta Giraldo (Note: In this Spanish name, the first or paternal surname is Acosta and the second or maternal family name is Giraldo.) (born 19 April 2000) is a Colombian archer. She won the gold medal at the 2019 World Youth Archery Championships. Two years later, she competed in the women's individual event at the 2020 Summer Olympics.
