= Georcy-Stéphanie Picard =

Canadian archer (born 1991)

Georcy-Stéphanie Thiffeault Picard
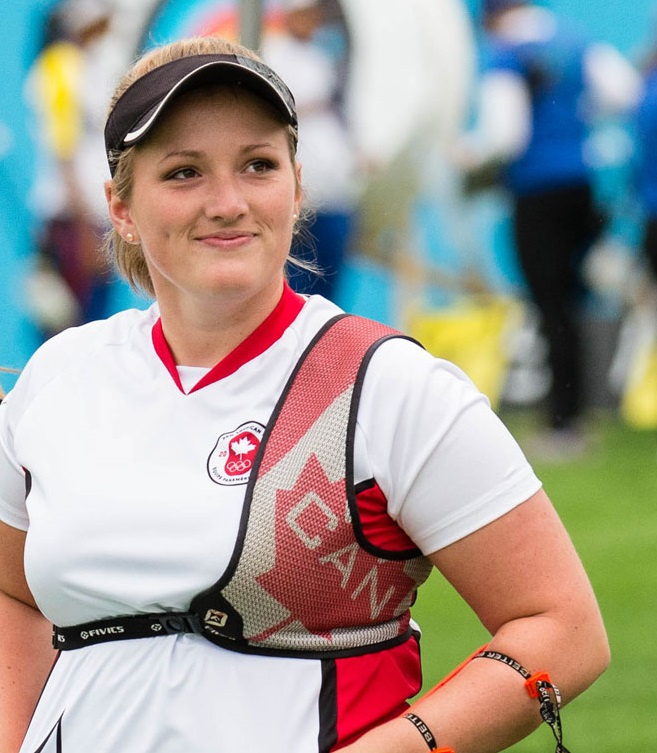
- Georcy-Stéphanie Thiffeault Picard at the 2015 Pan American Games

Personal information
- Full name: Georcy-Stéphanie Thiffeault; Picard
- Nickname: Gee-Oh
- Born: 8 February 1991 (age 35) Montreal, Quebec, Canada
- Height: 1.76 m (5 ft 9 in)
- Weight: 78 kg (172 lb)

Sport
- Country: Canada
- Sport: Archery
- Event: Recurve
- Club: Club de Tir à l'Arc de Montréal
- Coached by: Sylvain Cadieux
- Updated on 4 March 2017

Georcy-Stéphanie Thiffeault Picard (born 8 February 1991) is a Canadian competitive archer from Montreal, Quebec. She attained a top-ten finish as a member of the Canadian archery squad in both the individual and team recurve at the 2015 Pan American Games, and eventually competed at the 2016 Summer Olympics, losing her first round match to Chinese Taipei's team bronze medalist and world-ranked archer Tan Ya-ting. Picard currently trains under the tutelage of her coach Sylvain Cadieux at the Montreal Archery Club (French: Club de Tir à l'Arc de Montréal).

Picard became involved in the sport as an eight-year-old pupil at a summer camp in Montreal. She desired to represent the Canadian national team upon watching the Olympic archery on television from Athens 2004, which eventually impelled her to compete in various local and regional tournaments across the nation.

Picard's maiden appearance on the Canadian team came as a seventeen-year-old teen at the 2008 World Youth Championships in Antalya, Turkey, where she finished a credible eighteenth in the individual recurve. Following two more editions of the same tournament under the youth level in 2009 and 2011 respectively, Picard seized her opportunity to compete as a member of Canada's senior national team for the first timeat the 2013 World Championships, which were held in the same location as her youth debut.

The 2015 Pan American Games in Toronto, Ontario gave Picard a chance to prove her credentials on both the world and continental stage, comfortably notching a top ten placement each in both the individual and team archery recurve, respectively.

Leading up to her Olympic debut in Rio de Janeiro, Picard captured a bronze medal at the 2016 American Continental Qualifying Tournament in Medellín, Colombia to hand the Canadians a coveted spot for the Games.

At the 2016 Summer Olympics, Picard was selected to compete as a lone female archer for the Canadian squad, shooting only in the individual recurve tournament. Sitting almost at the bottom of the leaderboard with a sixty-first-seeded score of 585 points, 10 perfect tens, and a single bull's eye from the classification stage, Picard fell out of her opening round match in a 1–7 defeat to the Taiwanese archer and team recurve bronze medalist Tan Ya-ting.
