= Hugh MacDonald (archer) =

Canadian archer (born 1974)

Personal information
- Born: September 22, 1974 (age 51) Saskatoon, Saskatchewan, Canada
Medal record
Men's Archery
Representing Canada
Pan American Games
Silver medal – second place	2007 Rio de Janeiro	Team

Hugh MacDonald (born September 22, 1974 in Saskatoon, Saskatchewan) is a male archer from Canada. He graduated from the University of Waterloo in 1997 with a degree in pure math.

MacDonald is a member of the Canadian National archery team who has competed in the 2007 World Archery Championships, 2003 World Archery Championships, the 2001 World Archery Championships, and many other events.

At the 2007 World Championships in Leipzig Germany, MacDonald was a member of the Team Canada (along with Jason Lyon and Crispin Duenas) who won Canada's 3 Olympic spots by placing 8th in the Team Round. Canada has not had a full archery team in the Olympics since 1996 in Atlanta.

MacDonald did not compete at the 2008 Summer Olympics. He was defeated at the Canadian Olympic Trials by Jason Lyon, Crispin Duenas and JD Burns. MacDonald was the alternate if one of these members was not able to compete.
