= Yesenia Valencia =

Guatemalan archer (born 1991)

Personal information
- Born: 16 March 1991 (age 35)

Sport
- Country: Guatemala
- Sport: Archery
- Event: recurve
- Updated on 10 September 2015

Yesenia Valencia (born 16 March 1991) is a Guatemalan recurve archer. She competed in the individual recurve event at the 2015 World Archery Championships in Copenhagen, Denmark.
