= Jiang Lin =

Chinese archer (born 1981)

Medal record

Men's archery

Olympic Games
Bronze medal – third place	2008 Beijing	Team

Jiang Lin (Chinese: 姜林; pinyin: Jiāng Lín; born 23 October 1981 in Qingdao, Shandong) is a male archer from the People's Republic of China.

== 2008 Summer Olympics ==
At the 2008 Summer Olympics in Beijing, Jiang finished his ranking round with a total of 632 points. This gave him the 55th seed for the final competition bracket in which he faced Lee Chang-Hwan in the first round. Lee won the confrontation with 112-108 and would eventually be beaten in the third round.

Together with Li Wenquan and Xue Haifeng, Jiang also took part in the team event. With his 632 score from the ranking round combined with the 646 of Li and the 663 of Xue the Chinese were in 12th and last position after the ranking round. However, in the first round they were too strong for the British team 214–210. They advanced to the semi-final by eliminating Russia 217–209, but lost against South Korea 221–218. In the bronze medal match China was too strong for the team from Ukraine, beating them 222–219 to claim the bronze.

== Major achievements ==
Recurve Men category

- 44 th world Outdoor Target Archery Championships 07.07.2007 Leipzig, Germany: Position 22
- World Archery Cup, Stage 1 01.04.2007 Ulsan, Korea: Position 31
- Meteksan World Cup Stage 4 27.09.2006 Shanghai, PR China: Position 8
- Meteksan World Cup Stage 1- EMAU Grand Prix 10.05.2006 Porec, Croatia: Position 20
