= Jorge Pablo Chapoy =

Mexican archer (born 1973)

Personal information
- Born: 26 April 1973 (age 53) Monclova, Coahuila, Mexico

Sport
- Sport: Archery
Medal record
Representing Mexico
Pan American Games
Silver medal – second place	2003 Santo Domingo	Team
Bronze medal – third place	2007 Rio de Janeiro	Team

Jorge Pablo Chapoy Bosque (born 26 April 1973) is a Mexican archer.

Chapoy competed at the 2004 Summer Olympics in the men's individual. He was defeated in the first round of elimination, placing 34th overall. Chapoy was also a member of the 12th-place Mexican men's archery team at the 2004 Summer Olympics.
