= Alan Wills (archer) =

British archer (born 1981)

Medal record

Men's recurve archery

Representing United Kingdom

World Cup Final
Bronze medal – third place	2007 Dubai	Individual

World Field Championships
Gold medal – first place	2010 Visegrád	Individual

World Games
Silver medal – second place	2005 Duisburg	Individual
Bronze medal – third place	2013 Cali	Individual

Alan James "Al" Wills (born 3 August 1981 in Cumbria) is an athlete from the United Kingdom. He competes in archery.

== 2008 Summer Olympics ==
Wills represented Great Britain at the 2008 Summer Olympics in the Archery at the 2008 Summer Olympics, competing in the men's individual and team archery. He finished his ranking round with a total of 661 points. This gave him the 21st seed for the final competition bracket. There he beat Mauro Nespoli 103–98 in the first round and went on to edge out another Italian, Marco Galiazzo, 110–109 in round two. His run was ended by Juan Carlos Stevens of Cuba in the last 16 as he was defeated 108–104.

Together with Simon Terry and Laurence Godfrey he also took part in the team event. With his 661 score from the ranking round combined with the 670 of Simon Terry and the 657 of Godfrey the British were in fifth position after the ranking round. In the first elimination round they faced the Chinese team and got eliminated with 214–210. The Chinese went on to win the bronze medal.

== 2012 Summer Olympics ==
At the 2012 Summer Olympics, Wills again competed in both the men's individual and team archery competitions. In the individual, he was knocked out in the first round by Taylor Worth. The British team were knocked out by Ukraine in the first round of the team event.
