= Zach Garrett =

American archer (born 1995)

Personal information
- Born: April 8, 1995 (age 31) Wellington, Missouri, U.S.
- Height: 5 ft 10 in (178 cm)
- Weight: 160 lb (73 kg)

Sport
- Country: United States
- Sport: Archery
- Event: recurve
Medal record
Men's archery
Representing United States
Olympic Games
Silver medal – second place	2016 Rio de Janeiro	Team
Pan American Games
Silver medal – second place	2015 Toronto	Team

Zach Garrett (born April 8, 1995) is a male American recurve archer. He competed in the individual recurve event and the team recurve event at the 2015 World Archery Championships in Copenhagen, Denmark.

Garrett won a silver medal in the men's team archery event at the 2015 Pan American Games. In August 2016, Garrett won a silver medal in Archery at the Summer Olympics in Rio de Janeiro, Brazil.
