= Jason Lyon =

Canadian archer (born 1986)

Jason Lyon OLY BKin
Personal information
- Born: 24 May 1986 (age 40) Winnipeg, Manitoba, Canada
- Height: 184 cm (6 ft 0 in)
- Weight: 96 kg (212 lb)

Sport
- Country: Canada
- Sport: Archery
- Club: Interlake Archers
- Coached by: Jay Barrs
Medal record
Pan American Games
Silver medal – second place	2007 Rio de Janeiro	Team
Bronze medal – third place	2015 Toronto	Individual
Commonwealth Games
Silver medal – second place	2010 New Delhi	Individual

Jason ("Jay") Lyon (born 24 May 1986 in Winnipeg, Manitoba) is an archer from Canada. He was a member of the Canadian National archery team who has competed in the 2004 World Junior Archery Championships, 2005 World Senior Archery Championships, the 2007 World Senior Archery Championships, the 2007 Pan-American Games and many other events.

== Career ==
At the 2007 World Championships Lyon was a member of Team Canada (along with Crispin Duenas and Hugh MacDonald) who won three Olympic Team spots, placing eighth in the Team Round. Canada had not qualified a full archery team at the Olympics since 1996.

Lyon held the FITA 1440 record at 1345, a score that is considered a landmark in recurve archery. He was the first and only Canadian recurve archer to hold this title.

He was also a member of the silver medal-winning team at the 2007 Pan-American Games in Rio de Janeiro where they set the Pan-American Games Record with a 224. Lyon finished fourth at the Pan-American Games, losing the bronze to Vic Wunderle (USA) 109–114. On his way to the bronze match Lyon set and broke the Pan-American Games' 12-arrow match-play record, going 114–105 against Pablo Daniel Basgall (ARG), 115–107 against Jorge Pablo Chapoy (MEX) and 116–112 against Eduardo Luis Vélez (MEX). He then shot 109–114 against Juan Carlos Stevens (CUB) and 109–114 against Vic Wunderle (USA) to finish fourth.

Lyon previously held the FITA 1440 record at 1345, a score that is considered a landmark in recurve archery. He was the first and only Canadian recurve archer to hold this title.

He won the Canadian Olympic Trials and represented Canada at the 2008 Summer Olympics in Beijing. He finished his ranking round with a total of 646 points, which gave him the 47th seed for the final competition bracket in which he faced Chinese home favourite Xue Haifeng in the first round. Lyon won the game 111–106 and met Brady Ellison in the second round, which he won by 113–107. In the third round Lyon was unable to win against Bair Badënov from Russia (115–110), who eventually won the bronze medal. This did however make Jason the highest ranking Canadian to ever finish in an Olympic Archery event (finishing 10th individual) and he still holds the top Canadian Archer spot.

Together with John-David Burnes and Crispin Duenas he also took part in the team event. With his 646 score from the ranking round combined with the 644 of Burnes and the 664 of Duenas, the Canadians were in 11th position after the ranking round. In the first round they were beaten by the Italian team 219–217. They went on to reach the final and win the silver medal.

In 2010 Lyon won a silver medal in the individual event at the 2010 Commonwealth Games in New Delhi. He lost in the gold medal finals to India's Rahul Banarjee 6 to 5 in the set system. In the previous match he defeated Rahul's teammate, Jayanta Talukdar, 6 to 0.

In the 2011 season, at the World Championships in Italy, he shot an impressive ranking score of 1350 and ranked eighth. He finished fifth in the matchplay and win Canada an Olympic Quota placing.

Lyon was the only Canadian to have achieved the 1350 benchmark score, it took significant efforts since, but Lyon was barely bested.

During the end of the 2011 archery season, he added archery legend Jay Barrs to his support team. Barrs is currently Lyon's personal coach and the two continued working together leading into the 2016 Olympic Games.

Lyon is also a student at the University of Winnipeg where he is studying kinesiology. In his off time he enjoys working out or playing other sports. His favorite sport, is ice hockey. He is an avid Winnipeg Jets fan.

== Olympic history ==
- 2008 Beijing – 10th place (individual), 11th place (team)

== Commonwealth Games history ==
- 2010 New Delhi – silver medal

== Pan-Am Games history ==
- 2007 Rio de Janeiro – 4th (individual), silver medal (team)
- 2011 Guadalajara – 9th (individual), 4th (team)
- 2015 Toronto – bronze medal (individual), 6th (team)

== World Championship history ==
- 2005 Madrid – 77th (individual), no team
- 2007 Leipzig – 20th (individual), 8th (team)
- 2009 Ulsan – 14th (individual), 12th (team)
- 2011 Turin – 5th (individual), 9th (team)
- 2013 Antalya – 8th (individual), 8th (team)
- 2015 Copenhagen – 33rd (individual), 9th (team)
