= Daniel Betancur =

Colombian archer (born 1995)

Personal information
- Full name: Daniel Betancur Martinez
- Born: 16 October 1995 (age 30) Colombia

Sport
- Sport: archery (recurve)
Medal record
Representing Colombia
Men's recurve archery
Event	1st	2nd	3rd
Pan American Championships	0	0	1
CAC Games	1	4	0
Bolivarian Games	1	0	0
Total	2	4	1
Pan American Championships
Bronze medal – third place	2018 Medellín	Team
Central American and Caribbean Games
Gold medal – first place	2018 Barranquilla	Team
Silver medal – second place	2014 Veracruz	Individual
Silver medal – second place	2014 Veracruz	Team
Silver medal – second place	2018 Barranquilla	Individual
Silver medal – second place	2023 San Salvador	Team
Bolivarian Games
Gold medal – first place	2022 Valledupar	Team
- Updated on 14 April 2024

Daniel Betancur Martinez (Note: In this Spanish name, the first or paternal surname is Betancur and the second or maternal family name is Martinez.) (born 16 October 1995) is a male recurve archer from Colombia. He competed at the 2015 World Archery Championships in Copenhagen, Denmark as well as the 2015 World Archery Youth Championships in Yankton, South Dakota.
