= Xue Haifeng =

Chinese archer (born 1980)

Medal record

Men's archery

Olympic Games
Bronze medal – third place	2008 Beijing	Team

Xue Haifeng (Chinese: 薛海峰; pinyin: Xuē Hǎifēng, born January 13, 1980, in Ili, Xinjiang, People's Republic of China) is an archer from the People's Republic of China.

== 2004 Summer Olympics ==
Xue competed for China at the 2004 Summer Olympics in men's individual archery. He won his first match, advancing to the round of 32. In the second round of elimination, he was again victorious and advanced to the round of 16. The third match was Xue's downfall, as he lost to Vic Wunderle of the United States. Xue placed 12th overall.

== 2008 Summer Olympics ==
At the 2008 Summer Olympics in Beijing, Xue finished his ranking round with a total of 663 points. This gave him the 18th seed for the final competition bracket in which he faced Jay Lyon in the first round. Lyon was only the 47th seed, but managed to score 111 points, while Xue only scored 106. Lyon would eventually advance to the third round where he was beaten by Bair Badënov.

Together with Li Wenquan and Jiang Lin he also took part in the team event. With his 663 score from the ranking round combined with the 646 of Li and the 632 of Jiang the Chinese were in 12th and last position after the ranking round. However, in the first round they were too strong for the British team 214-210. They advanced to the semi-final by eliminating Russia 217-209, but lost against South Korea 221-218. In the bronze medal match China was too strong for the team from Ukraine, beating them 222-219 to claim the bronze.
