= Luis Álvarez (archer) =

Mexican archer (born 1991)

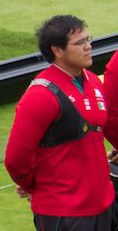
- Álvarez in 2012

Personal information
- Full name: Luis Antonio Álvarez Murillo
- Nickname: El Abuelo
- Born: 13 April 1991 (age 35) Mexicali, Mexico
- Height: 174 cm (5 ft 9 in)

Sport
- Country: Mexico
- Sport: Archery
Medal record
Olympic Games
Bronze medal – third place	2020 Tokyo	Mixed team
Pan American Games
Gold medal – first place	2015 Toronto	Individual
Gold medal – first place	2015 Toronto	Team
Central American and Caribbean Games
Gold medal – first place	2014 Veracruz	Individual
Gold medal – first place	2014 Veracruz	Team
World Cup
Gold medal – first place	2012 Ogden	Individual
Gold medal – first place	2013 Medellín	Team
Gold medal – first place	2014 Wrocław	Team
Silver medal – second place	2015 Mexico City	Mixed team
Bronze medal – third place	2013 Wrocław	Team
Bronze medal – third place	2021 Lausanne	Mixed team
Bronze medal – third place	2021 Paris	Mixed team

Luis Antonio Álvarez Murillo (Note: In this Spanish name, the first or paternal surname is Álvarez and the second or maternal family name is Murillo.) (born 13 April 1991), also known as El Abuelo (The Grandfather), is a Mexican athlete who competes in archery.

Álvarez was selected as a member of the Mexican male archery team to compete at the 2012 Summer Olympics at London, after winning the 2012 Archery World Cup in Ogden, United States. This was the first Olympic games for the Mexican archer. At the 2012 Olympics, in the men's individual event, he was ranked 30th after the ranking round. He then beat Yavor Khristov in the first elimination round, before being beaten by eventual gold medallist Oh Jin-Hyek in the second round. In the men's team event, Mexico beat Malaysia and France before losing to Italy in the semifinal. Mexico lost out on the bronze medal, losing the bronze medal match to South Korea 215–219.

He won the bronze medal with Alejandra Valencia in the inaugural archery mixed team event at the 2020 Summer Olympics.
