= Khatuna Lorig =

Georgian archer (born 1974)

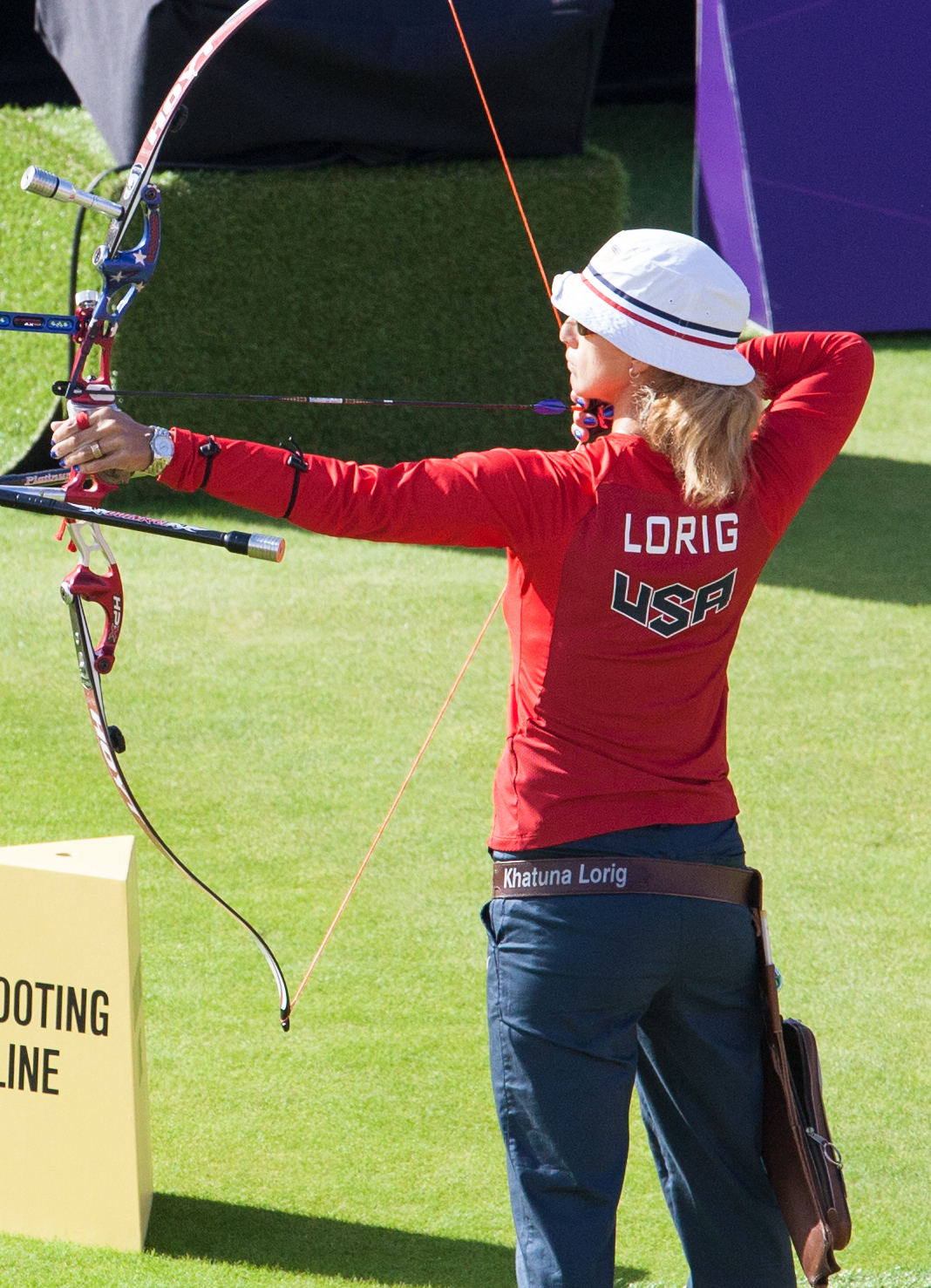
- Lorig at the 2012 Summer Olympics

Personal information
- Nationality: Georgia; United States
- Born: January 1, 1974 (age 52) Tbilisi, Georgian SSR, Soviet Union
- Height: 5 ft 7 in (1.70 m)
- Weight: 141 lb (64 kg)

Sport
- Country: Georgia (1992–2000); United States (2008–present)
- Sport: Archery
Medal record
Representing Unified Team
Olympic Games
Bronze medal – third place	1992 Barcelona	Team
Representing United States
World Championships
Silver medal – second place	2013 Belek	Mixed team
World Cup Final
Gold medal – first place	2010 Edinburgh	Mixed Team
Pan American Games
Gold medal – first place	2015 Toronto	Individual
Gold medal – first place	2019 Lima	Team
Silver medal – second place	2019 Lima	Individual
Silver medal – second place	2011 Guadalajara	Team
Bronze medal – third place	2015 Toronto	Team

Khatuna Lorig (/kəˈtuːnɑː ˈlɔːrɪɡ/; born January 1, 1974, as Khatuna Kvrivishvili, Georgian: ხათუნა ქვრივიშვილი) is a Georgian archer who immigrated to the United States.

She has used at least 3 different last names while competing in and representing various different countries.

- Khatuna Kvrivichvili, Soviet Union (part of the Unified Team) at Barcelona 1992. At the age of 18, she won the bronze medal
- Khatuna Lorigi, while competing for Georgia in the Atlanta (1996) and Sydney (2000) Olympic games.
- Khatuna Lorig, from 2004 when she was unable to participate in the Olympic Games in Athens because of citizenship issues. She competed for the United States at the 2008 Olympics. Then, at the age of 38 she competed again for Team USA at the 2012 London Olympics.

== Career ==
Lorig's hometown is Tbilisi, Georgia, where she started her archery training in 6th grade at a state-sponsored school. Her training involved learning how to hold a bow for eight months while looking in the mirror before being able to actually load an arrow.

Lorig earned individual bronze and team gold medals at the 1990 European Championships in Barcelona competing for the Soviet Union. She also earned individual and team gold medals at the 1992 European Championships in Malta.

When she was 18 and while four months pregnant, Lorig earned a bronze medal in women's team competing for the Unified Team at the 1992 Olympics. Lorig went on to compete for Georgia at the 1996 Olympics. After competing in the 1996 Olympics in the United States, she decided to remain in the US and settled in Brooklyn and later New Jersey. She competed again for Georgia at the 2000 Olympics as Khatuna Lorigi.

Lorig became a naturalized U.S. citizen and qualified to compete in the women's individual archery event at the 2008 Olympics in Beijing. There Lorig finished her ranking round with a total of 635 points. This gave her the 26th seed for the final competition bracket in which she faced Virginie Arnold in the first round, beating the archer from France with 107-105. In the second round she was too strong for Alison Williamson with 112-109 and via Ana Rendón (107-95) she achieved her place in the quarter-final. There she was unable to beat eventual bronze medalist Yun Ok-Hee who won the match with 111-105. Lorig was afterwards chosen to be the U.S. flagbearer in the closing ceremony.

She taught actress Jennifer Lawrence how to shoot with a recurve bow for the 2012 film The Hunger Games. During that year's Olympics, Lorig finished fourth.

In April 2016, she received her first sponsorship deal with a non-archery brand, appearing in a commercial for Bridgestone tires. She was also selected to be part of "Team Bridgestone," a group of 6 Olympic and Paralympic athletes attempting to compete in the 2016 Rio Olympic Games.
