= Daniel Pineda (archer) =

Colombian archer (born 1993)

Personal information
- Full name: Daniel Felipe Pineda Osorio
- Born: 5 November 1993 (age 32) Pereira, Risaralda, Colombia
- Height: 186 cm (6 ft 1 in)
- Weight: 83 kg (183 lb)

Sport
- Country: Colombia
- Sport: Archery (recurve)
Medal record
Men's recurve archery
Representing Colombia
Event	1st	2nd	3rd
Pan American Games	0	1	1
Pan American Championships	0	2	0
CAC Games	2	1	1
South American Games	2	2	1
Bolivarian Games	1	0	0
Total	5	6	3
Pan American Games
Silver medal – second place	2019 Lima	Mixed team
Bronze medal – third place	2011 Guadalajara	Individual
Pan American Championships
Silver medal – second place	2021 Monterrey	Team
Silver medal – second place	2022 Santiago	Team
Central American and Caribbean Games
Gold medal – first place	2014 Veracruz	Mixed team
Gold medal – first place	2018 Barranquilla	Team
Silver medal – second place	2014 Veracruz	Team
Bronze medal – third place	2018 Barranquilla	Mixed team
South American Games
Gold medal – first place	2018 Cochabamba	Individual
Gold medal – first place	2018 Cochabamba	Team
Silver medal – second place	2014 Santiago	Team
Silver medal – second place	2022 Asunción	Team
Bronze medal – third place	2018 Cochabamba	Mixed team
Bolivarian Games
Gold medal – first place	2022 Valledupar	Team
- Updated on 24 December 2024

Daniel Felipe Pineda Osorio (born 5 November 1993 in Pereira, Colombia) is a Colombian male archer who competed individual event at the 2012 Summer Olympics. Pineda won the bronze medal in the individual event of the 2011 Pan American Games. He competed at the 2015 World Archery Championships in Copenhagen, Denmark.

He competed at the 2020 Summer Olympics.
