= Daniel Xavier =

Brazilian archer (born 1982)

Personal information
- Full name: Daniel Rezende Xavier
- Born: 31 August 1982 (age 43) Belo Horizonte, Minas Gerais
Medal record
Men's recurve archery
Representing Brazil
Pan American Games
Bronze medal – third place	2015 Toronto	Men's Team
South American Games
Gold medal – first place	2014 Santiago	Men's Team

Daniel Rezende Xavier (born 31 August 1982 in Belo Horizonte, Brazil) is a Brazilian archer. He competed in the individual event at the 2012 Summer Olympics.
