= Eduardo Vélez (archer) =

Mexican archer (born 1986)

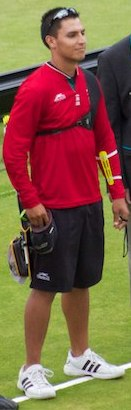

Personal information
- Full name: Luis Eduardo Vélez Sánchez
- Born: 26 July 1986 (age 39) Guadalajara, Jalisco, Mexico
Medal record
Men's Archery
Representing Mexico
Archery World Cup
| Gold medal – first place | 2013 Medellín | Team |
| Gold medal – first place | 2014 Wrocław | Mixed team |
| Gold medal – first place | 2014 Lausanne | Mixed team |
| Silver medal – second place | 2006 San Salvador | Team |
| Bronze medal – third place | 2009 Shanghai | Team |
| Bronze medal – third place | 2013 Wrocław | Team |
Pan American Games
| Silver medal – second place | 2011 Guadalajara | Team |
| Bronze medal – third place | 2007 Rio de Janeiro | Team |

Luis Eduardo Vélez Sánchez (born 26 July 1986, in Guadalajara, Jalisco) is an athlete from Mexico, who competes in archery.

== 2008 Summer Olympics ==
At the 2008 Summer Olympics in Beijing, Vélez finished his ranking round with a total of 660 points, which gave him the 24th seed for the final competition bracket in which he faced Vic Wunderle in the first round. Wunderle was only the 41st seed, but already had a lot of experience and showed that in the confrontation with Vélez. Wunderle won the game with 106–102.

== 2012 Summer Olympics ==
At the 2012 Summer Olympics Vélez competed in both the men's individual and the men's team events. In the individual event, he was 26th after the ranking round. He faced Milad Vaziri in the first knockout round, winning 7–1. He was then knocked out by eventual bronze medallist Dai Xiaoxiang, 6–0.

In the team event, Mexico beat Malaysia 216 - 211 in the first round. They went on to beat France 220 - 212 in the quarterfinals, before losing 215 - 217 to Italy in the semifinal. Mexico faced South Korea in the bronze medal shoot-off, losing 219–224.
