= Maydenia Sarduy =

Cuban archer (born 1984)

Personal information
- Full name: Maydenia Sarduy González
- Nationality: Cuban
- Born: April 20, 1984 (age 42)

Sport
- Country: Cuba
- Sport: Archery
Medal record
Women's recurve archery
Representing Cuba
Pan American Games
Bronze medal – third place	2011 Guadalajara	Team
Central American and Caribbean Games
Bronze medal – third place	2014 Veracruz	Team
Bronze medal – third place	2014 Barranquilla	Mixed team
Bronze medal – third place	2018 Barranquilla	Team
Silver medal – second place	2018 Barranquilla	Mixed team
Bronze medal – third place	2023 San Salvador	Mixed team

Maydenia Sarduy González (Note: In this Spanish name, the first or paternal surname is Sarduy and the second or maternal family name is González.) (born 20 April 1984) is an archer from Cuba.

Sarduy represented Cuba at the 2004 Summer Olympics. She placed 58th in the women's individual ranking round with a 72-arrow score of 595. In the first round of elimination, she faced 7th-ranked Justyna Mospinek of Poland. Sarduy lost 162–145 in the 18-arrow match, placing 42nd overall in women's individual archery.
