= Juan Carlos Stevens =

Cuban archer (born 1968)

Personal information
- Full name: Juan Carlos Stevens Caminero
- Born: October 22, 1968 (age 57) Santiago de Cuba, Cuba
- Height: 175 cm (5 ft 9 in)
- Weight: 80 kg (176 lb)
Medal record
Men's Archery
Representing Cuba
Pan American Games
Silver medal – second place	2007 Rio de Janeiro	Individual
Bronze medal – third place	2011 Guadalajara	Team
Bronze medal – third place	1999 Winnipeg	Team
Central American and Caribbean Games
Gold medal – first place	2006 Cartagena	Team
Bronze medal – third place	2006 Cartagena	Individual
Bronze medal – third place	2014 Veracruz	Team

Juan Carlos Stevens Caminero (Note: In this Spanish name, the first or paternal surname is Stevens and the second or maternal family name is Caminero.) (born October 22, 1968, in Santiago de Cuba) is an athlete from Cuba, who competes in archery.

== 2008 Summer Olympics ==
At the 2008 Summer Olympics in Beijing Stevens finished his ranking round with a total of 659 points, which made him the 28th seed for the final competition bracket. He faced Calvin Hartley in the first round, where he beat the archer from South Africa. Both archers scored 107 points in the regular match, but in the extra round Stevens scored 19 points and Hartley scored 18 points. Stevens went on to reach the quarter-finals by beating Alexandru Bodnar (108-101) and Alan Wills (108-104). In the quarter-finals he also scored 108 points, but his opponent Park Kyung-Mo did the same and they had to go into the extra round which the South Korean won with 19–17.

== 2012 Summer Olympics ==
At the 2012 Summer Olympics Stevens faced India's Tarundeep Rai in the first round, losing 6–5.
