= 2015 World Archery Championships – Men's individual recurve =

The men's individual recurve competition at the 2015 World Archery Championships took place from 27 July to 2 August 2015 in Copenhagen, Denmark. The reigning champion and world number one archer Lee Seung-yun was not selected for the South Korean team, so did not compete.

The top 8 competitors, excluding those whose countries earned team qualifying spots in the team event, earned an individual qualifying spot for their country for the 2016 Summer Olympics. Only one spot per country could be earned this way. An Olympic Secondary Tournament was held to rank competitors reaching the same round.

== Schedule ==
All times are local (UTC+01:00).

Date	Time	Phase
26 July	13:00	Official practice
27 July	13:00	Qualification
29 July	11:45	1/48 and 1/24 Eliminations
30 July	16:00	1/16, 1/8, QF, and SF Eliminations
2 August	15:00	Medal matches

== Qualification round ==
Pre-tournament world rankings ('WR') are taken from the 18 July 2015 World Archery Rankings.

Bye to third round
Qualified for eliminations

Rank	Name	Nation	Score	10	X	WR
1	Mauro Nespoli	Italy	666	29	8	12
2	Dan Olaru	Moldova	663	30	7	82
3	Ku Bon-chan	South Korea	660	30	7	5
4	Sjef van den Berg	Netherlands	660	26	7	34
5	David Pasqualucci	Italy	658	25	7	29
6	Antonio Fernández	Spain	657	28	12	58
7	Brady Ellison	United States	657	23	9	2
8	Takaharu Furukawa	Japan	656	26	7	16
9	Kuo Cheng-wei	Chinese Taipei	656	32	6	22
10	Markiyan Ivashko	Ukraine	656	26	9	23
11	Oh Jin-hyek	South Korea	655	26	8	6
12	Marcus Vinicius D'Almeida	Brazil	655	24	8	8
13	Rick van der Ven	Netherlands	645	24	8	3
14	Collin Klimitchek	United States	654	21	4	17
15	Kim Woo-jin	South Korea	653	31	11	4
16	Taylor Worth	Australia	652	27	10	27
17	Ryan Tyack	Australia	652	23	4	44
18	Christian Weiss	Germany	651	30	12	126
19	Gu Xuesong	China	651	24	10	28
20	Juan Carlos Stevens	Cuba	650	25	5	54
21	Denis Gankin	Kazakhstan	650	22	11	69
22	Miguel Alvariño	Spain	649	23	5	10
23	Wang Hou-chieh	Chinese Taipei	649	19	6	32
24	Jantsangiin Gantögs	Mongolia	648	25	2	55
25	Florian Kahllund	Germany	646	26	11	7
26	Alexander Liahushev	Belarus	646	23	10	59
27	Xing Yu	China	645	24	7	92
28	Jay Lyon	Canada	645	22	10	41
29	Jonas Lennart Andersson	Sweden	645	21	8	576
30	Lucas Daniel	France	643	25	9	18
31	Ayumi Iwata	Japan	643	22	6	119
32	Pawel Marzec	Poland	643	21	6	163
33	Ruman Shana	Bangladesh	643	18	7	98
34	Crispin Duenas	Canada	642	24	7	9
35	Alexander Bertschler	Austria	642	22	7	139
36	Alec Potts	Australia	642	21	6	183
37	Dai Xiaoxiang	China	642	21	4	15
38	Mete Gazoz	Turkey	642	20	11	105
39	Oscar Ticas	El Salvador	642	18	5	62
40	Lasha Pkhakadze	Georgia	641	28	12	42
41	Juan René Serrano	Mexico	641	23	8	63
42	Anton Prilepov	Belarus	641	22	5	13
43	Yavor Hristov	Bulgaria	641	21	10	162
44	Antti Tekoniemi	Finland	641	18	2	52
45	Yu Guan-lin	Chinese Taipei	641	18	1	37
46	Rahul Banerjee	India	641	14	4	125
47	Andreas Gstoettner	Austria	640	25	7	209
48	Jon Chol	North Korea	640	20	7	68
49	Arpad Banda	Hungary	640	15	5	233
50	Patrick Huston	United Kingdom	639	22	7	107
51	Elías Malavé	Venezuela	639	17	3	80
52	Andrei Danila	Romania	638	18	5	272
53	Alexander Kozhin	Russia	638	17	5	328
54	Daniel Xavier	Brazil	637	25	10	81
55	Darren Wallace	Ireland	637	24	8	288
56	Jan van Tongeren	Netherlands	637	22	6	389
57	Viktor Ruban	Ukraine	637	16	4	31
58	Adrian Faber	Switzerland	636	25	10	192
59	Mangal Singh Champia	India	636	19	10	242
60	Zach Garrett	United States	636	17	8	53
61	Heorhiy Ivanytskyy	Ukraine	636	17	4	40
62	Klemen Štrajhar	Slovenia	636	16	5	220
63	Simon Nesemann	Germany	636	16	4	95
64	Ben Adriaensen	Belgium	635	25	6	293
65	Khairul Anuar Mohamad	Malaysia	635	22	7	21
66	Bård Nesteng	Norway	634	15	7	89
67	Ernesto Horacio Boardman	Mexico	634	17	7	184
68	Michele Frangilli	Italy	634	17	3	51
69	Naoya Oniyama	Japan	633	20	12	150
70	Slawomir Naploszek	Poland	633	19	7	49
71	Daniel Betancur	Colombia	633	19	4	71
72	Pit Klein	Luxembourg	632	20	3	178
73	Ahmed El-Nemr	Egypt	632	16	5	389
74	Sadegh Ashrafi	Iran	632	13	4	576
75	Guillermo Aguilar Gimpel	Chile	631	19	6	124
76	Jeff Henckels	Luxembourg	631	16	5	25
77	Bernardo Oliveira	Brazil	630	21	7	76
78	Casper Lauridsen	Denmark	630	20	5	261
79	Diego Castro	Guatemala	630	20	4	75
80	Pak Yong-won	North Korea	630	20	4	85
81	Luka Popovic	Serbia	630	16	3	882
82	Ebrahim Ranjbar	Iran	629	18	8	353
83	Ricardo Vasquez	Venezuela	629	16	3	78
84	Rok Bizjak	Slovenia	629	15	5	142
85	Jayanta Talukdar	India	628	19	9	50
86	Patrick Rivest-Bunster	Canada	628	18	7	99
87	Csaba Gajdos	Hungary	628	17	6	907
88	Petr Heinrich	Czech Republic	628	17	3	300
89	Juan Ignacio Rodríguez	Spain	628	15	4	38
90	Kinley Tshering	Bhutan	627	16	7	232
91	Atiq Bazil Bakri	Malaysia	627	14	4	86
92	Riau Ega Agatha	Indonesia	627	13	4	30
93	Razvan Marcu	Romania	626	23	9	142
94	Jean-Charles Valladont	France	626	19	7	11
95	Taras Senyuk	Azerbaijan	626	17	2	153
96	Pierre Plihon	France	626	13	6	14
97	Rob Elder	Fiji	626	13	5	286
98	Oibek Saidiyev	Kazakhstan	626	10	1	203
99	Dominik Irrasch	Austria	625	19	6	237
100	Rafal Wojtkowiak	Poland	625	18	2	128
101	Thomas Rufer	Switzerland	625	16	4	271
102	Sanzhar Mussayev	Kazakhstan	624	17	5	117
103	Hugo Robles	Argentina	624	16	4	101
104	Bair Tsybekdorzhiev	Russia	624	14	7	39
105	Andrés Aguilar	Chile	623	17	8	88
106	Andrés Pila	Colombia	623	17	8	196
107	Simen Burhol	Norway	622	19	4	284
108	Vasil Shahnazaryan	Armenia	622	19	2	389
109	Alexandros Karageorgiou	Greece	622	16	4	239
110	Daniel Ciornei	Romania	622	13	3	177
111	Daniel Pineda	Colombia	621	20	7	73
112	Jaba Moseshvili	Georgia	621	15	1	204
113	Juuso Huhtala	Finland	620	16	8	322
114	Luis Álvarez	Mexico	620	15	4	24
115	Boris Baláž	Slovakia	619	18	4	200
116	Robin Ramaekers	Belgium	619	17	3	66
117	Marco Di Matteo	South Africa	618	20	7	240
118	Paek Myong-chol	North Korea	617	19	5	576
119	Nico Thiry	Belgium	617	16	6	276
120	Alexey Nikolaev	Russia	617	13	2	118
121	Den Habjan Malavašič	Slovenia	617	10	2	130
122	Ashe Morgan	United Kingdom	616	17	6	114
123	Muhammad Hanif Wijaya	Indonesia	616	11	0	325
124	Domingos Repas	Portugal	615	12	1	107
125	Mimis El Helali	Cyprus	613	13	6	173
126	Gombodorjiin Gan-Erdene	Mongolia	612	18	5	228
127	Damyan Dachev	Bulgaria	612	16	5	662
128	Eero Maenpaa	Finland	611	15	7	n/a
129	Florante Matan	Philippines	611	13	5	353
130	Hendra Purnama	Indonesia	611	13	3	136
131	Olmo Parrilla	Guatemala	611	11	6	198
132	Florian Faber	Switzerland	611	10	2	480
133	Pavel Dalidovich	Belarus	611	7	3	114
134	Vladimir Hurban Jr.	Slovakia	610	16	6	464
135	Jaanus Gross	Estonia	610	14	6	352
136	Tanel Kaasik	Estonia	610	13	2	907
137	Amin Pirali	Iran	610	13	0	842
138	Purevsuren Bataa	Mongolia	610	12	5	389
139	Gavin Sutherland	Zimbabwe	610	12	3	194
140	Jan Zapletal	Czech Republic	608	15	4	790
141	Andreas Skalberg	Sweden	608	11	1	61
142	Sigurjón Atli Sigurðsson	Iceland	608	10	3	505
143	Luis Gabriel Moreno	Philippines	606	8	1	298
144	Martin Hámor	Czech Republic	605	9	1	480
145	Keith Hanlon	Ireland	603	22	9	431
146	Shiek Sojeb	Bangladesh	603	13	6	123
147	Pearu Jakob Ojamae	Estonia	602	13	5	293
148	Thomas Flossbach	Guatemala	602	11	2	96
149	Yağız Yılmaz	Turkey	601	13	7	60
150	Javier Irizarry	Puerto Rico	601	11	6	164
151	Guy Matzkin	Israel	601	10	1	280
152	Paul Andre Hagen	Norway	601	7	1	265
153	Hady El-Kholosy	Egypt	600	10	3	160
154	Aleksandar Beatovic	Serbia	600	7	3	n/a
155	Ibrahim Al-Mohandi	Qatar	599	14	1	120
156	Johan Weiss	Denmark	599	9	2	208
157	Jean Pizarro	Puerto Rico	599	9	1	181
158	Mohamed Jelloun	Morocco	598	13	5	414
159	Mark Javier	Philippines	598	11	3	684
160	Kieran Slater	United Kingdom	598	11	0	84
161	Matija Mihalic	Croatia	597	15	2	133
162	Robert Peterson	New Zealand	597	13	8	186
163	Dalius Macernius	Lithuania	597	11	2	n/a
164	Björn Jansson	Sweden	596	17	7	907
165	Mohammed Milon	Bangladesh	596	12	3	214
166	Haziq Kamaruddin	Malaysia	596	9	2	122
167	Jean Marie Cliff Babet	Mauritius	596	0	0	414
168	Terrence Van Moerkerken	South Africa	594	15	4	132
169	Asparuh Latev	Bulgaria	593	11	3	488
170	Jose Irizarry	Puerto Rico	593	8	3	104
171	Jonathan Hindborg Ipsen	Denmark	593	6	3	907
172	Amet Umerov	Uzbekistan	592	15	5	n/a
173	Daniel Cannelli	Argentina	592	14	2	282
174	Kerem Kirsever	Turkey	592	13	4	313
175	Micheal Irwin	Ireland	591	8	0	166
176	Ali Ahmed Salem	Qatar	590	13	5	264
177	Nima Wangdi	Bhutan	590	6	1	814
178	Mohamed Bouchane	Morocco	587	12	4	n/a
179	Stephan Klein	Mauritius	587	8	2	n/a
180	Juraj Duchon	Slovakia	586	14	7	329
181	Janis Apsitis	Latvia	586	6	2	317
182	Obai Arafat	Saudi Arabia	585	11	1	576
183	Luis Carlos Pissarra Goncalves	Portugal	585	7	0	366
184	Adamas Kovalevskij	Lithuania	584	12	3	n/a
185	Arne Jensen	Tonga	584	10	1	n/a
186	Modestas Sliauteris	Lithuania	582	13	3	446
187	My Ismail Alaoui	Morocco	581	13	5	363
188	Gevorg Hazarumyan	Armenia	579	11	1	353
189	Natan Gofman	Israel	579	9	2	n/a
190	Fares Al-Otaibi	Saudi Arabia	576	10	0	312
191	Abdulellh Ali Moh Bin Ali	Saudi Arabia	573	10	1	907
192	Sardor Rustamov	Uzbekistan	570	6	0	842
193	Bardhyl Luzhnica	Kosovo	570	4	2	894
194	Felipe Perez Alvarez	Chile	568	14	4	159
195	Karma Tshering	Bhutan	568	6	0	842
196	Aramayis Apresyan	Armenia	562	7	0	n/a
197	Sukrit Hotrabhvanon	Thailand	554	9	2	n/a
198	David Sanchez	Venezuela	549	4	1	224
199	Mohamed R. Alblooshi	United Arab Emirates	547	7	2	n/a
200	Jamshid Sodikov	Uzbekistan	541	4	2	480
201	Areneo David	Malawi	536	0	0	907
202	Atdhe Luzhnica	Kosovo	530	7	1	894
203	Hazir Asllani	Kosovo	527	6	3	488
204	Omer Shacham	Israel	525	4	1	n/a
205	Guillermo Jordan	Bolivia	513	1	0	n/a
206	Carlos Gimenez	Iceland	502	6	2	n/a
207	Pablo Jordan	Bolivia	487	1	0	n/a
208	Carsten Tarnow	Iceland	481	0	0	907
209	Mohammedsultan Alblooshi	United Arab Emirates	479	1	0	n/a
210	Ahmed Alowais	United Arab Emirates	473	5	0	n/a
211	William Charles Coles	United States Virgin Islands	467	6	1	362
212	John Chifuniro	Malawi	351	1	0	n/a
	Khomkrit Duangsuwan	Thailand	DNS			131
	Witthaya Thamwong	Thailand	DNS			138
	Sula Blick	Uganda	DNS			n/a

== Elimination rounds ==
=== Top half ===
==== Section 1 ====
1st round
1	(Italy) Mauro Nespoli
Bye
33	(Bangladesh) Ruman Shana	0	2	1	2	2
80	(North Korea) Pak Yong-won	2	0	1	0	0
81	(Serbia) Luka Popovic	2	1	0	0	2	1
32	(Poland) Pawel Marzec	0	1	2	2	0	0
17	(Australia) Ryan Tyack	2	1	2	2
96	(France) Pierre Plihon	0	1	0	0
65	(Malaysia) Khairul Anuar Mohamad	1	1	1	0	2	0
48	(North Korea) Jon Chol	1	1	1	2	0	1
49	(Hungary) Arpad Banda	1	2	1	0	1	0
64	(Belgium) Ben Adriaensen	1	0	1	2	1	1
97	(Fiji) Rob Elder	0	1	0	0
16	(Australia) Taylor Worth	2	1	2	2

2nd round
1	(Italy) Mauro Nespoli
Bye
33	(Bangladesh) Ruman Shana	1	2	1	2
81	(Serbia) Luka Popovic	1	0	1	0
17	(Australia) Ryan Tyack	0	0	1	2	2	0
48	(North Korea) Jon Chol	2	2	1	0	0	1
64	(Belgium) Ben Adriaensen	1	0	2	0	0
16	(Australia) Taylor Worth	1	2	0	2	2

3rd round
1	(Italy) Mauro Nespoli	1	2	2	2
33	(Bangladesh) Ruman Shana	1	0	0	0
48	(North Korea) Jon Chol	0	0	2	0
16	(Australia) Taylor Worth	2	2	0	2

4th round
1	(Italy) Mauro Nespoli	1	2	2	0	0	1
16	(Australia) Taylor Worth	1	0	0	2	2	0

==== Section 2 ====
1st round
9	(Chinese Taipei) Kuo Cheng-wei	1	0	0	2	2	1
104	(Russia) Bair Tsybekdorzhiev	1	2	2	0	0	0
57	(Ukraine) Viktor Ruban	2	2	0	1	2
56	(Netherlands) Jan van Tongeren	0	0	2	1	0
41	(Mexico) Juan René Serrano	1	0	1	0
72	(Luxembourg) Pit Klein	1	2	1	2
89	(Spain) Juan Ignacio Rodríguez	2	1	2	1
24	(Mongolia) Jantsangiin Gantögs	0	1	0	1
25	(Germany) Florian Kahllund	2	2	2
88	(Czech Republic) Petr Heinrich	0	0	0
73	(Egypt) Ahmed El-Nemr	2	0	0	2	0
40	(Georgia (country)) Lasha Pkhakadze	0	2	2	0	2
8	(Japan) Takaharu Furukawa
Bye

2nd round
9	(Chinese Taipei) Kuo Cheng-wei	2	1	2	0	0	0
57	(Ukraine) Viktor Ruban	0	1	0	2	2	1
72	(Luxembourg) Pit Klein	0	0	1	0
89	(Spain) Juan Ignacio Rodríguez	2	2	1	2
25	(Germany) Florian Kahllund	2	2	1	2
40	(Georgia (country)) Lasha Pkhakadze	0	0	1	0
8	(Japan) Takaharu Furukawa
Bye

3rd round
57	(Ukraine) Viktor Ruban	1	0	2	2	2
89	(Spain) Juan Ignacio Rodríguez	1	2	0	0	0
25	(Germany) Florian Kahllund	2	1	1	0	0
8	(Japan) Takaharu Furukawa	0	1	1	2	2

4th round
57	(Ukraine) Viktor Ruban	0	0	2	2	0
8	(Japan) Takaharu Furukawa	2	2	0	0	2

==== Section 3 ====
1st round
5	(Italy) David Pasqualucci
Bye
37	(China) Dai Xiaoxiang	2	2	2
76	(Luxembourg) Jeff Henckels	0	0	0
85	(India) Jayanta Talukdar	2	0	0	0
28	(Canada) Jason Lyon	0	2	2	2
21	(Kazakhstan) Denis Gankin	2	0	2	0	1	0
92	(Indonesia) Riau Ega Agatha	0	2	0	2	1	1
69	(Japan) Naoya Oniyama	0	0	0
44	(Finland) Antti Tekoniemi	2	2	2
53	(Russia) Alexander Kozhin	0	0	0
60	(United States) Zach Garrett	2	2	2
101	(Switzerland) Thomas Rufer	2	0	0	0
12	(Brazil) Marcus Vinicius D'Almeida	0	2	2	2

2nd round
5	(Italy) David Pasqualucci
Bye
37	(China) Dai Xiaoxiang	1	2	0	2	2
28	(Canada) Jason Lyon	1	0	2	0	0
92	(Indonesia) Riau Ega Agatha	0	1	2	2	1
44	(Finland) Antti Tekoniemi	2	1	0	0	1
60	(United States) Zach Garrett	1	0	0	0
12	(Brazil) Marcus Vinicius D'Almeida	1	2	2	2

3rd round
5	(Italy) David Pasqualucci	2	0	0	0
37	(China) Dai Xiaoxiang	0	2	2	2
92	(Indonesia) Riau Ega Agatha	0	2	1	0	2	0
12	(Brazil) Marcus Vinicius D'Almeida	2	0	1	2	0	1

4th round
37	(China) Dai Xiaoxiang	0	2	2	0	0
12	(Brazil) Marcus Vinicius D'Almeida	2	0	0	2	2

==== Section 4 ====
1st round
13	(Netherlands) Rick van der Ven	1	0	1	2	1	1
100	(Poland) Rafal Wojtkowiak	1	2	1	0	1	0
61	(Ukraine) Heorhiy Ivanytskyy	0	2	0	0
52	(Romania) Andrei Danila	2	0	2	2
45	(Chinese Taipei) Yu Guan-lin	2	0	0	0
68	(Italy) Michele Frangilli	0	2	2	2
93	(Romania) Razvan Marcu	2	0	2	2
20	(Cuba) Juan Carlos Stevens	0	2	0	0
29	(Sweden) Jonas Lennart Andersson	2	0	0	2	1	1
84	(Slovenia) Rok Bizjak	0	2	2	0	1	0
77	(Brazil) Bernardo Oliveira	0	0	0
36	(Australia) Alec Potts	2	2	2
4	(Netherlands) Sjef van den Berg
Bye

2nd round
13	(Netherlands) Rick van der Ven	2	2	2
52	(Romania) Andrei Danila	0	0	0
68	(Italy) Michele Frangilli	2	0	2	0	0
93	(Romania) Razvan Marcu	0	2	0	2	2
29	(Sweden) Jonas Lennart Andersson	2	2	1	2
36	(Australia) Alec Potts	0	0	1	0
4	(Netherlands) Sjef van den Berg
Bye

3rd round
13	(Netherlands) Rick van der Ven	2	2	2
93	(Romania) Razvan Marcu	0	0	0
29	(Sweden) Jonas Lennart Andersson	1	0	0	0
4	(Netherlands) Sjef van den Berg	1	2	2	2

4th round
13	(Netherlands) Rick van der Ven	1	2	1	1	0	1
4	(Netherlands) Sjef van den Berg	1	0	1	1	2	0

=== Bottom half ===
==== Section 5 ====
1st round
3	(South Korea) Ku Bon-chan
Bye
35	(Austria) Alexander Bertschler	0	2	2	0	0
78	(Denmark) Casper Lauridsen	2	0	0	2	2
83	(Venezuela) Ricardo Vasquez	1	2	0	0	2	0
30	(France) Lucas Daniel	1	0	2	2	0	1
19	(China) Gu Xuesong	0	2	2	0	2
94	(France) Jean-Charles Valladont	2	0	0	2	0
67	(Mexico) Ernesto Horacio Boardman	2	2	2
46	(India) Rahul Banerjee	0	0	0
51	(Venezuela) Elías Malavé	0	0	2	1	2	1
62	(Slovenia) Klemen Štrajhar	2	2	0	1	0	0
99	(Austria) Dominik Irrasch	0	2	2	2
14	(United States) Collin Klimitchek	2	0	0	0

2nd round
3	(South Korea) Ku Bon-chan
Bye
78	(Denmark) Casper Lauridsen	0	2	2	2
30	(France) Lucas Daniel	2	0	0	0
19	(China) Gu Xuesong	0	0	0
67	(Mexico) Ernesto Horacio Boardman	2	2	2
51	(Venezuela) Elías Malavé	2	2	2
99	(Austria) Dominik Irrasch	0	0	0

3rd round
3	(South Korea) Ku Bon-chan	2	1	2	2
78	(Denmark) Casper Lauridsen	0	1	0	0
67	(Mexico) Ernesto Horacio Boardman	2	0	0	0
51	(Venezuela) Elías Malavé	0	2	2	2

4th round
3	(South Korea) Ku Bon-chan	1	1	0	0
51	(Venezuela) Elías Malavé	1	1	2	2

==== Section 6 ====
1st round
11	(South Korea) Oh Jin-hyek	0	2	0	2	0
102	(Kazakhstan) Sanzhar Mussayev	2	0	2	0	2
59	(India) Mangal Singh Champia	0	2	2	1	2
54	(Brazil) Daniel Xavier	2	0	0	1	0
43	(Bulgaria) Yavor Hristov	2	2	1	0	2
70	(Poland) Slawomir Naploszek	0	0	1	2	0
91	(Malaysia) Atiq Bazil Bakri	0	1	0	0
22	(Spain) Miguel Alvariño	2	1	2	2
27	(China) Xing Yu	1	0	0	2	0
86	(Canada) Patrick Rivest-Bunster	1	2	2	0	2
75	(Chile) Guillermo Aguilar Gimpel	2	2	2
38	(Turkey) Mete Gazoz	0	0	0
6	(Spain) Antonio Fernández
Bye

2nd round
102	(Kazakhstan) Sanzhar Mussayev	0	0	1	2	0
59	(India) Mangal Singh Champia	2	2	1	0	2
43	(Bulgaria) Yavor Hristov	1	0	1	0
22	(Spain) Miguel Alvariño	1	2	1	2
86	(Canada) Patrick Rivest-Bunster	1	2	1	0	0
75	(Chile) Guillermo Aguilar Gimpel	1	0	1	2	2
6	(Spain) Antonio Fernández
Bye

3rd round
59	(India) Mangal Singh Champia	0	2	0	2	2
22	(Spain) Miguel Alvariño	2	0	2	0	0
75	(Chile) Guillermo Aguilar Gimpel	1	0	1	0
6	(Spain) Antonio Fernández	1	2	1	2

4th round
59	(India) Mangal Singh Champia	1	2	2	1
6	(Spain) Antonio Fernández	1	0	0	1

==== Section 7 ====
1st round
7	(United States) Brady Ellison
Bye
39	(El Salvador) Oscar Ticas	2	0	0	2	0
74	(Iran) Sadegh Ashrafi	0	2	2	0	2
87	(Hungary) Csaba Gajdos	2	1	0	2	2
26	(Belarus) Alexander Liahushev	0	1	2	0	0
23	(Chinese Taipei) Wang Hou-chieh	2	2	2
90	(Bhutan) Kinley Tshering	0	0	0
71	(Colombia) Daniel Betancur	0	2	2	1	1
42	(Belarus) Anton Prilepov	2	0	0	1	1
55	(Republic of Ireland) Darren Wallace	2	2	0	2
58	(Switzerland) Adrian Faber	0	0	2	0
103	(Argentina) Hugo Robles	0	0	2	1	1
10	(Ukraine) Markiyan Ivashko	2	2	0	1	1

2nd round
7	(United States) Brady Ellison
Bye
74	(Iran) Sadegh Ashrafi	2	1	0	2	2
87	(Hungary) Csaba Gajdos	0	1	2	0	0
23	(Chinese Taipei) Wang Hou-chieh	1	0	2	1	0
71	(Colombia) Daniel Betancur	1	2	0	1	2
55	(Republic of Ireland) Darren Wallace	0	1	0	2	2	1
10	(Ukraine) Markiyan Ivashko	2	1	2	0	0	0

3rd round
7	(United States) Brady Ellison	2	2	2
74	(Iran) Sadegh Ashrafi	0	0	0
71	(Colombia) Daniel Betancur	1	2	1	1	1
55	(Republic of Ireland) Darren Wallace	1	0	1	1	1

4th round
7	(United States) Brady Ellison	2	2	0	2
71	(Colombia) Daniel Betancur	0	0	2	0

==== Section 8 ====
1st round
15	(South Korea) Kim Woo-jin	0	0	1	2	2	1
98	(Kazakhstan) Oibek Saidiyev	2	2	1	0	0	0
63	(Germany) Simon Nesemann	0	0	0
50	(United Kingdom) Patrick Huston	2	2	2
47	(Austria) Andreas Gstoettner	2	0	2	2
66	(Norway) Bård Nesteng	0	2	0	0
95	(Azerbaijan) Taras Senyuk	2	0	1	2	0	0
18	(Germany) Christian Weiss	0	2	1	0	2	1
31	(Japan) Ayumi Iwata	0	2	1	0	2	0
82	(Iran) Ebrahim Ranjbar	2	0	1	2	0	1
79	(Guatemala) Diego Castro	2	0	0	0
34	(Canada) Crispin Duenas	0	2	2	2
2	(Moldova) Dan Olaru
Bye

2nd round
15	(South Korea) Kim Woo-jin	2	1	2	0	2
50	(United Kingdom) Patrick Huston	0	1	0	2	0
47	(Austria) Andreas Gstoettner	0	1	2	0	0
18	(Germany) Christian Weiss	2	1	0	2	2
82	(Iran) Ebrahim Ranjbar	1	2	0	2	0	0
34	(Canada) Crispin Duenas	1	0	2	0	2	1
2	(Moldova) Dan Olaru
Bye

3rd round
15	(South Korea) Kim Woo-jin	2	2	2
18	(Germany) Christian Weiss	0	0	0
34	(Canada) Crispin Duenas	2	1	2	1
2	(Moldova) Dan Olaru	0	1	0	1

4th round
15	(South Korea) Kim Woo-jin	2	2	2
34	(Canada) Crispin Duenas	0	0	0

== Finals ==
Quarterfinals
1	(Italy) Mauro Nespoli	0	0	0
8	(Japan) Takaharu Furukawa	2	2	2
12	(Brazil) Marcus Vinicius D'Almeida	0	2	0	1	0
13	(Netherlands) Rick van der Ven	2	0	2	1	2
51	(Venezuela) Elías Malavé	2	0	0	2	2
59	(India) Mangal Singh Champia	0	2	2	0	0
7	(United States) Brady Ellison	1	0	1	2	0
15	(South Korea) Kim Woo-jin	1	2	1	0	2

Semifinals
8	(Japan) Takaharu Furukawa	0	0	0
13	(Netherlands) Rick van der Ven	2	2	2
51	(Venezuela) Elías Malavé	1	2	0	0	1
15	(South Korea) Kim Woo-jin	1	0	2	2	1

Finals
13	(Netherlands) Rick van der Ven	0	0	1	1
15	(South Korea) Kim Woo-jin	2	2	1	1
Third place
8	(Japan) Takaharu Furukawa	2	0	0	2	1	1
51	(Venezuela) Elías Malavé	0	2	2	0	1	0
