= 2015 World Archery Championships – Men's team recurve =

The men's team recurve competition at the 2015 World Archery Championships took place from 26 July to 2 August in Copenhagen, Denmark.

A record 62 countries entered the full quota of 3 archers into the qualification round, thus becoming eligible for the team competition. The combined totals of the 3 archers from each country in the qualification round were added together, and the 16 teams with the highest combined scores competed in the elimination rounds.

Countries reaching the quarterfinals earned a team qualification spot (and corresponding 3 individual qualifying spots) for the 2016 Summer Olympics.

== Schedule ==
All times are UTC+01:00.

Date	Time	Phase
27 July	13:00	Qualification
28 July	09:55	1/8, QF, and SF Eliminations
2 August	11:00	Medal matches

== Qualification round ==
Pre-tournament world rankings ('WR') are taken from the 18 July 2015 World Archery Rankings.

Qualified for eliminations

Rank	Nation	Name	Score	WR
1	South Korea	Kim Woo-jin; Ku Bon-chan; Oh Jin-hyek	1968	1
2	Italy	Michele Frangilli; Mauro Nespoli; David Pasqualucci	1958	16
3	Netherlands	Sjef van den Berg; Rick van der Ven; Jan van Tongeren	1951	6
4	United States	Brady Ellison; Zach Garrett; Collin Klimitchek	1947	4
5	Australia	Alec Potts; Ryan Tyack; Taylor Worth	1946	17
6	Chinese Taipei	Kuo Cheng-wei; Wang Hou-chieh; Yu Guan-lin	1946	13
7	China	Dai Xiaoxiang; Gu Xuesong; Xing Yu	1938	2
8	Spain	Miguel Alvariño; Antonio Fernández; Juan Ignacio Rodríguez	1934	10
9	Germany	Florian Kahllund; Simon Nesemann; Christian Weiss	1933	15
10	Japan	Takaharu Furukawa; Ayumi Iwata; Naoya Oniyama	1932	5
11	Ukraine	Heorhiy Ivanytskyy; Markiyan Ivashko; Viktor Ruban	1929	11
12	Brazil	Marcus Vinicius D'Almeida; Bernardo Oliveira; Daniel Xavier	1922	34
13	Canada	Crispin Duenas; Jason Lyon; Patrick Rivest-Bunster	1915	18
14	Austria	Alexander Bertschler; Andreas Gstoettner; Dominik Irrasch	1907	56
15	India	Rahul Banerjee; Mangal Singh Champia; Jayanta Talukdar	1905	8
16	Poland	Pawel Marzec; Slawomir Naploszek; Rafal Wojtkowiak	1901	23
17	Kazakhstan	Denis Gankin; Sanzhar Mussayev; Oibek Saidiyev	1900	21
18	Belarus	Pavel Dalidovich; Alexander Liahushev; Anton Prilepov	1898	12
19	France	Lucas Daniel; Pierre Plihon; Jean-Charles Valladont	1895	3
20	Mexico	Luis Álvarez; Ernesto Horacio Boardman; Juan René Serrano	1895	8
21	North Korea	Jon Chol; Paek Myong-chol; Pak Yong-won	1887	25
22	Romania	Daniel Ciornei; Andrei Danila; Razvan Marcu	1886	50
23	Slovenia	Rok Bizjak; Den Habjan Malavašič; Klemen Štrajhar	1882	19
24	Russia	Alexander Kozhin; Alexey Nikolaev; Bair Tsybekdorzhiev	1879	7
25	Colombia	Daniel Betancur; Daniel Pacheco; Daniel Pineda	1877	22
26	Switzerland	Adrian Faber; Florian Faber; Thomas Rufer	1872	77
27	Finland	Juuso Huhtala; Eero Maenpaa; Antti Tekoniemi	1872	54
28	Belgium	Ben Adriaensen; Robin Ramaekers; Nico Thiry	1871	38
29	Iran	Sadegh Ashrafi; Amin Pirali Najafabadi; Ebrahim Ranjbarkivaj	1871	47
30	Mongolia	Purevsuren Bataa; Gombodorj Gan Erdene; Jantsan Gantugs	1870	28
31	Malaysia	Atiq Bazil Bakri; Haziq Kamaruddin; Khairul Anuar Mohamad	1858	14
32	Norway	Simen Burhol; Paul Andre Hagen; Bård Nesteng	1858	39
33	Indonesia	Riau Ega Agatha; Hendra Purnama; Muhammad Hanif Wijaya	1854	26
34	United Kingdom	Patrick Huston; Ashe Morgan; Kieran Slater	1853	20
35	Sweden	Jonas Lennart Andersson; Björn Jansson; Andreas Skalberg	1849	77
36	Bulgaria	Damyan Dachev; Yavor Hristov; Asparuh Latev	1846	55
37	Guatemala	Diego Castro; Thomas Flossbach; Olmo Parrilla	1843	36
38	Bangladesh	Mohammed Milon; Ruman Shana; Shiek Sojeb	1842	24
39	Czech Republic	Martin Hámor; Petr Heinrich; Jan Zapletal	1841	65
40	Turkey	Mete Gazoz; Kerem Kirsever; Yağız Yılmaz	1835	27
41	Ireland	Keith Hanlon; Micheal Irwin; Darren Wallace	1831	56
42	Chile	Andrés Aguilar; Guillermo Aguilar Gimpel; Felipe Perez Alvarez	1822	33
43	Estonia	Jaanus Gross; Tanel Kaasik; Pearu Jakob Ojamae	1822	77
44	Denmark	Jonathan Hindborg Ipsen; Casper Lauridsen; Johan Weiss	1822	29
45	Venezuela	Elías Malavé; David Sanchez; Ricardo Vasquez	1817	41
46	Slovakia	Boris Baláž; Juraj Duchon; Vladimir Hurban Jr.	1815	56
47	Philippines	Mark Javier; Florante F. Matan; Luis Gabriel Moreno	1815	62
48	Puerto Rico	Javier Irizarry; Jose Irizarry; Jean Pizarro	1793	35
49	Bhutan	Karma Tshering; Kinley Tshering; Nima Wangdi	1785	48
50	Morocco	My Ismail Alaoui; Mohamed Bouchane; Mohamed Jelloun	1766	69
51	Armenia	Aramayis Apresyan; Gevorg Hazarumyan; Vasil Shahnazaryan	1763	71
52	Lithuania	Lenardas Bernotas; Adamas Kovalevskij; Modestas Sliauteris	1763	77
53	Saudi Arabia	Fares Mater Alotaibi; Obai Khaled Arafat; Abdulellh Ali Moh Bin Ali	1734	65
54	Israel	Natan Gofman; Guy Matzkin; Omer Shacham	1705	n/a
55	Uzbekistan	Umerov Amet; Sardor Rustamov; Jamshid Sadikov	1703	51
56	Kosovo	Hazir Asllani; Atdhe Luzhnica; Bardhyl Luzhnica	1627	77
57	Iceland	Carlos Gimenez; Sigurjón Atli Sigurðsson; Carsten Tarnow	1591	77
58	United Arab Emirates	Mohamed R. Alblooshi; Mohammedsultan Alblooshi; Ahmed Alowais	1499	n/a
	Thailand	Khomkrit Duangsuwan; Sukrit Hotrabhvanon; Witthaya Thamwong	DNS	32

== Elimination rounds ==
1st round
1	South Korea	2	0	2	0	1
16	Poland	0	2	0	2	0
9	Germany	1	0	2	1	0
8	Spain	1	2	0	1	1
5	Australia	2	1	0	2
12	Brazil	0	1	2	0
13	Canada	0	0	2	0
4	United States	2	2	0	2
3	Netherlands	2	2	2
14	Austria	0	0	0
11	Ukraine	0	0	1
6	Chinese Taipei	2	2	1
7	China	0	2	1	1	1
10	Japan	2	0	1	1	0
15	India	0	2	0	2	0
2	Italy	2	0	2	0	1

Quarterfinals
1	South Korea	2	2	1
8	Spain	0	0	1
5	Australia	0	0	0
4	United States	2	2	2
3	Netherlands	0	0	2	1
6	Chinese Taipei	2	2	0	1
7	China	2	0	2	0	0
2	Italy	0	2	0	2	1

Semifinals
1	South Korea	2	1	2
4	United States	0	1	0
6	Chinese Taipei	0	2	2	0	0
2	Italy	2	0	0	2	1

Finals
1	South Korea	2	2	2
2	Italy	0	0	0
Third place
4	United States	2	0	0	0
6	Chinese Taipei	0	2	2	2
