= Archery at the 2015 European Games – Men's individual =

Men's individual at the 2015 European Games
- Venue: Tofiq Bahramov Stadium
- Date: 16–22 June
- Competitors: 64 from 37 nations

Medalists
gold medal	Miguel Alvariño	Spain
silver medal	Sjef van den Berg	Netherlands
bronze medal	Anton Prilepov	Belarus

The men's individual recurve competition at the 2015 European Games took place from 16–22 June 2015 in the Tofiq Bahramov Stadium in Baku, Azerbaijan.

64 archers entered the competition, with a maximum of three entries per country.

== Ranking round ==
The ranking round took place on 16 June 2015 to determine the seeding for the knockout rounds. It consisted of two rounds of 36 arrows, with a maximum score of 720. World rankings shown are correct at tournament start date.

Rank	Archer	Score	WR
1	Mauro Nespoli (ITA)	683	11
2	Rick van der Ven (NED)	679	5
3	Sjef van den Berg (NED)	678	101
4	Heorhiy Ivanytskyy (UKR)	677	78
5	Florian Kahllund (GER)	674	3
6	Pierre Plihon (FRA)	673	13
7	Anton Prilepov (BLR)	673	19
8	Lucas Daniel (FRA)	672	17
9	Pavel Dalidovich (BLR)	671	111
10	Lasha Pkhakadze (GEO)	669	55
11	Yağız Yılmaz (TUR)	668	105
12	Miguel Alvariño (ESP)	666	16
13	David Pasqualucci (ITA)	666	34
14	Matija Mihalić (CRO)	665	197
15	Bair Tsybekdorzhiev (RUS)	664	37
16	Antti Tekoniemi (FIN)	664	63
17	Sławomir Napłoszek (POL)	664	109
18	Markiyan Ivashko (UKR)	663	25
19	Viktor Ruban (UKR)	663	33
20	Jeff Henckels (LUX)	662	31
21	Robin Ramaekers (BEL)	661	80
22	Alexander Kozhin (RUS)	660	287
23	Aliaksandr Liahusheu (BLR)	660	46
24	Juan Ignacio Rodriguez (ESP)	659	40
25	Jean-Charles Valladont (FRA)	658	12
26	Bård Nesteng (NOR)	658	69
27	Christian Weiss (GER)	657	114
28	Alexander Bertschler (AUT)	657	147
29	Mitch Dielemans (NED)	655	191
30	Simon Nesemann (GER)	654	95
31	Daniel Ciornei (ROU)	654	189
32	Dan Olaru (MDA)	652	67
33	Rafał Wojtkowiak (POL)	651	166
34	Johan Weiss (DEN)	651	306
35	Yavor Hristov (BUL)	651	360
36	Michele Frangilli (ITA)	650	53
37	Antonio Fernández (ESP)	650	52
38	Andreas Skalberg (SWE)	648	54
39	Rok Bizjak (SLO)	647	134
40	Beligto Tsynguev (RUS)	646	214
41	Paul André Hagen (NOR)	646	309
42	Marek Szafran (POL)	645	231
43	Kieran Slater (GBR)	645	119
44	Fatih Bozlar (TUR)	643	104
45	Taras Senyuk (AZE)	643	119
46	Mete Gazoz (TUR)	641	178
47	Adrian Faber (SUI)	641	179
48	Mimis El Helali (CYP)	638	167
49	Jaanus Gross (EST)	636	511
50	Aleksey Kopnin (AZE)	636	197
51	Guy Matzkin (ISR)	631	335
52	Darren Wallace (IRL)	630	521
53	Alexandros Karageorgiou (GRE)	630	264
54	Jaka Komočar (SLO)	629	41
55	Boris Balaz (SVK)	623	197
56	Den Habjan Malavašič (SLO)	616	206
57	Roman Vengerov (AZE)	614	379
58	Sigurjón Atli Sigurðsson (ISL)	614	915
59	Christoffer Furnes (NOR)	608	382
60	Marvin Grischke (LIE)	603	337
61	Dragan Svilanović (SRB)	593	896
62	Eduards Lapsiņš (LAT)	589	475
63	Emanuele Guidi (SMR)	577	696
64	Hazir Asllani (KOS)	554	896

== Elimination rounds ==
=== Finals ===
Semifinals
17	Sławomir Napłoszek (POL)	0	1	0	2	0
12	Miguel Alvariño (ESP)	2	1	2	0	2
3	Sjef van den Berg (NED)	2	2	2
7	Anton Prilepov (BLR)	0	0	0

Finals
12	Miguel Alvariño (ESP)	1	2	2	2
3	Sjef van den Berg (NED)	1	0	0	0
Third place
17	Sławomir Napłoszek (POL)	0	1	2	0	0
7	Anton Prilepov (BLR)	2	1	0	2	2

=== Section 1 ===
Round of 64
1	M Nespoli (ITA)	2	2	2
64	H Asllani (KOS)	0	0	0
33	R Wojtkowiak (POL)	1	2	0	2	0	1
32	D Olaru (MDA)	1	0	2	0	2	0
17	S Naploszek (POL)	0	2	2	1	2
48	M El Helali (CYP)	2	0	0	1	0
49	J Gross (EST)	0	1	0	0
16	A Tekoniemi (FIN)	2	1	2	2
9	P Dalidovich (BLR)	0	0	0
56	D Habjan Malavašič (SLO)	2	2	2
41	PA Hagen (NOR)	2	0	0	0
24	JI Rodriguez (ESP)	0	2	2	2
25	J-C Valladont (FRA)	2	0	1	0	1
40	B Tsynguev (RUS)	0	2	1	2	1
57	R Vengerov (AZE)	0	0	0
8	L Daniel (FRA)	2	2	2

Round of 32
1	M Nespoli (ITA)	2	2	2
33	R Wojtkowiak (POL)	0	0	0
17	S Naploszek (POL)	0	2	2	2
16	A Tekoniemi (FIN)	2	0	0	0
56	D Habjan Malavašič (SLO)	2	2	1	2
24	JI Rodriguez (ESP)	0	0	1	0
40	B Tsynguev (RUS)	0	1	2	0	0
8	L Daniel (FRA)	2	1	0	2	2

Round of 16
1	M Nespoli (ITA)	2	0	2	0	0
17	S Naploszek (POL)	0	2	0	2	2
56	D Habjan Malavašič (SLO)	0	0	0
8	L Daniel (FRA)	2	2	2

Quarter-finals
17	S Naploszek (POL)	2	2	2
8	L Daniel (FRA)	0	0	0

=== Section 2 ===
Round of 64
5	F Kahllund (GER)	2	2	2
60	M Grischke (LIE)	0	0	0
37	A Fernández (ESP)	2	2	2
28	A Bertschler (AUT)	0	0	0
21	R Ramaekers (BEL)	2	2	0	0	2
44	F Bozlar (TUR)	0	0	2	2	0
53	A Karageorgiou (GRE)	2	0	0	2	0
12	M Alvariño (ESP)	0	2	2	0	2
13	D Pasqualucci (ITA)	0	2	2	2
52	D Wallace (IRL)	2	0	0	0
45	T Senyuk (AZE)	0	2	1	1	0
20	J Henckels (LUX)	2	0	1	1	2
29	M Dielemans (NED)	1	2	2	0	2
36	M Frangilli (ITA)	1	0	0	2	0
61	D Svilanović (SRB)	1	2	1	0	0
4	H Ivanytskyy (UKR)	1	0	1	2	2

Round of 32
5	F Kahllund (GER)	2	0	0	2	2
37	A Fernández (ESP)	0	2	2	0	0
21	R Ramaekers (BEL)	0	0	0
12	M Alvariño (ESP)	2	2	2
13	D Pasqualucci (ITA)	1	0	2	1	0
20	J Henckels (LUX)	1	2	0	1	2
29	M Dielemans (NED)	0	1	2	0	0
4	H Ivanytskyy (UKR)	2	1	0	2	2

Round of 16
5	F Kahllund (GER)	2	0	1	0	0
12	M Alvariño (ESP)	0	2	1	2	2
20	J Henckels (LUX)	0	1	1	0
4	H Ivanytskyy (UKR)	2	1	1	2

Quarter-finals
12	M Alvariño (ESP)	0	2	0	2	1	1
4	H Ivanytskyy (UKR)	2	0	2	0	1	0

=== Section 3 ===
Round of 64
3	S van den Berg (NED)	2	2	2
62	E Lapsiņš (LAT)	0	0	0
35	Y Hristov (BUL)	2	2	0	2
30	S Nesemann (GER)	0	0	2	0
19	V Ruban (UKR)	1	2	2	0	2
46	M Gazoz (TUR)	1	0	0	2	0
51	G Matzkin (ISR)	0	0	2	0
14	M Mihalić (CRO)	2	2	0	2
11	Y Yılmaz (TUR)	0	2	1	2	2
54	J Komočar (SLO)	2	0	1	0	0
43	K Slater (GBR)	2	0	2	2
22	A Kozhin (RUS)	0	2	0	0
27	C Weiss (GER)	2	2	0	2
38	A Skalberg (SWE)	0	0	2	0
59	C Furnes (NOR)	0	0	2	0
6	P Plihon (FRA)	2	2	0	2

Round of 32
3	S van den Berg (NED)	2	0	2	1	2
35	Y Hristov (BUL)	0	2	0	1	0
19	V Ruban (UKR)	2	2	1	2
14	M Mihalić (CRO)	0	0	1	0
11	Y Yılmaz (TUR)	0	0	0
43	K Slater (GBR)	2	2	2
27	C Weiss (GER)	2	0	2	0	0
6	P Plihon (FRA)	0	2	0	2	2

Round of 16
3	S van den Berg (NED)	2	0	2	2
19	V Ruban (UKR)	0	2	0	0
43	K Slater (GBR)	2	1	0	2	0	0
6	P Plihon (FRA)	0	1	2	0	2	1

Quarter-finals
3	S van den Berg (NED)	2	1	2	0	2
6	P Plihon (FRA)	0	1	0	2	0

=== Section 4 ===
Round of 64
7	A Prilepov (BLR)	0	2	2	1	2
58	SA Sigurðsson (ISL)	2	0	0	1	0
39	R Bizjak (SLO)	0	0	0
26	B Nesteng (NOR)	2	2	2
23	A Liahusheu (BLR)	0	2	0	2	0
42	M Szafran (POL)	2	0	2	0	2
55	B Balaz (SVK)	0	0	0
10	L Pkhakadze (GEO)	2	2	2
15	B Tsybekdorzhiev (RUS)	1	1	2	2
50	A Kopnin (AZE)	1	1	0	0
47	A Faber (SUI)	1	1	1	1	0
18	M Ivashko (UKR)	1	1	1	1	2
31	D Ciornei (ROU)	0	0	0
34	J Weiss (DEN)	2	2	2
63	E Guidi (SMR)	0	0	0
2	R van der Ven (NED)	2	2	2

Round of 32
7	A Prilepov (BLR)	2	2	2
26	B Nesteng (NOR)	0	0	0
42	M Szafran (POL)	1	1	0	0
10	L Pkhakadze (GEO)	1	1	2	2
15	B Tsybekdorzhiev (RUS)	1	0	1	0
18	M Ivashko (UKR)	1	2	1	2
34	J Weiss (DEN)	0	1	0	2	0
2	R van der Ven (NED)	2	1	2	0	2

Round of 16
7	A Prilepov (BLR)	0	2	2	0	2
10	L Pkhakadze (GEO)	2	0	0	2	0
18	M Ivashko (UKR)	1	0	0	0
2	R van der Ven (NED)	1	2	2	2

Quarter-finals
7	A Prilepov (BLR)	1	2	0	2	1
2	R van der Ven (NED)	1	0	2	0	1
