= Heorhiy Ivanytskyy =

Ukrainian archer (born 1992)

Personal information
- Born: 6 May 1992 (age 34) Lviv, Ukraine
- Height: 1.89 m (6 ft 2 in)
- Weight: 94 kg (207 lb)

Sport
- Country: Ukraine
- Sport: Archery
- Event: Recurve
- Club: Dynamo
- Coached by: T. Obraztsova, V. Tkachek
Medal record
Men's archery
Representing Ukraine
European Games
Gold medal – first place	2015 Baku	Men's team
Bronze medal – third place	2015 Baku	Mixed team
European Archery Championships
Silver medal – second place	2021 Antalya	Men's team
World Indoor Archery Championships
Gold medal – first place	2014 Nîmes	Men's team
Gold medal – first place	2016 Ankara	Men's individual
Bronze medal – third place	2018 Yankton	Men's team
European Indoor Archery Championships
Gold medal – first place	2015 Koper	Men's individual
World Junior Indoor Archery Championships
Gold medal – first place	2009 Rzeszów	Men's team
Silver medal – second place	2012 Enterprise	Men's team
- Updated on April 17, 2022

Heorhiy Ivanytskyy (Ukrainian: Георгій Іваницький; born 6 May 1992 in Lviv, Ukraine) is a Ukrainian archer. He is champion and bronze medalist of the 2015 European Games. He won silver medal at the 2021 European Championships in team event and multiple medals at the World Indoor Archery Championships.

== Career ==
Ivanytskyy started archery in 2005 and made his international debut in 2008. After several international successes in junior competitions, including two medals at the World Indoor Archery Championships, he became member of the senior national team.

The first international success for Ivanytskyy at the senior level came in 2014 when he together with Markiyan Ivashko and Olympic champion Viktor Ruban won the men's team competition at the 2014 World Indoor Championships in France. Two years later, in 2016, he became World Champion in individual event. At the 2018 World Indoor Championships, he was third in the men's team event (together with Oleksii Hunbin and Viktor Ruban).

Ivanytskyy successfully competed at the 2015 European Games in Baku, Azerbaijan. On 17 June he won a bronze medal together with Lidiia Sichenikova in the mixed team event. They finished fourth in qualification, won against Finnish double in the first round of the elimination rounds and Russian team in the quarterfinals, lost to future champions Natalia Valeeva and Mauro Nespoli from Italy, and finally won against Slovenian Ana Umer and Rok Bizjak in the bronze medal final. On 18 June Ivanytskyy competed together with Ivashko and Ruban in the men's team event. After finishing fourth in qualifications, they won in the elimination rounds against Slovenia, Italy and the Netherlands, thus reaching the final. In the final, the Ukrainian team won 5-4 against the Spanish trio (Miguel Alvariño, Juan Ignacio Rodríguez, and Antonio Fernández) and became the European Games champions. Ivanytskyy continued to compete in the individual event after the team competitions finished. He finished 4th in qualification and won in the eliminations rounds against Dragan Svilanović from Serbia, Mitch Dielemans from the Netherlands, Jeff Henckels from Luxembourg, but he lost in the quarterfinals to twelfth-ranked Miguel Alvariño from Spain.

At the 2015 World Championships in Copenhagen, Denmark, Ivanytskyy reached the eliminations rounds in the individual event, but he lost in the first round (with 104 competitors) to Andrei Danila from Romania. In the men's team event, Ivanytskyy together with Ivashko and Ruban reached round of 16 where they lost to Chinese Taipei (Kuo Cheng-wei, Wang Hou-chieh, and Yu Guan-lin).

Ivanytskyy participated in the 2017 Summer Universiade in Taipei, where he reached Round of 16 in individual competition and round of 16 in men's team competition (together with Oleksii Hunbin and Mykhailo Kostash). That year he also participated in the World Championships in Mexico City where he was just 17th in individual competition, 9th in the mixed team event and 17th in the men's team event.

During the 2019 Archery World Cup, Ivanytskyy together with Oleksii Hunbin and Sergii Makarevych won silver medals in team competition in Berlin where the 4th stage of the World Cup was held. They lost to Turkey (Samet Ak, Ali Aydın, and Mete Gazoz). This was the only medal for Ukraine in that season.

The 2021 European Archery Championships, which was held in Antalya, brought Ivanytskyy his first European Championships medal. Together with Oleksii Hunbin and Ivan Kozhokar, he won silver medal in team competition. Ukraine lost in the final to the Netherlands' team composed of Steve Wijler, Sjef van den Berg, and Rick van der Ven. In individual competition he was 33rd.

At the Final Olympic Qualification Tournament, held in Paris, Ivanytskyy reached quarterfinals. Since he lost to his team fellow Oleksii Hunbin in the quarterfinal, the national team management decided to pick Hunbin as Ukrainian representative at the 2020 Summer Olympics. At that tournament Ukraine men's team also ranked 4th, but it wasn't enough to qualify a team for Tokyo.

After failing to qualify for the 2020 Summer Olympics, Ivanytskyy competed at the 2021 World Championships in Yankton, United States, where he reached round of 48 in the individual competition and round of 16 in the team competition (together with Hunbin and Kozhokar).

== Personal life ==
He graduated from Lviv State University of Physical Culture. His hobby is table tennis. He served in the National Guard of Ukraine during the 2022 Russian invasion of Ukraine.
