= Archery at the 2015 European Games – Mixed team =

Mixed team at the 2015 European Games
- Venue: Tofiq Bahramov Stadium
- Date: 16–17 June
- Competitors: 58 from 29 nations

Medalists
| gold medal | Natalia Valeeva; Mauro Nespoli | Italy |
| silver medal | Khatuna Narimanidze; Lasha Pkhakadze | Georgia |
| bronze medal | Lidiia Sichenikova; Heorhiy Ivanytskyy | Ukraine |

The mixed team archery event at the 2015 European Games in Baku took place between 16 and 17 June.

== Ranking round ==
The ranking round took place on 16 June 2015 to determine the seeding for the knockout rounds. It consisted of two rounds of 36 arrows, with a maximum score of 720. 29 nations entered at least one male and female archer, and so were eligible to qualify for the mixed team competition. The top 15 countries by combined score qualified, along with the hosts. World rankings shown are correct at tournament start date.

Key

Qualified for eliminations

| Rank | Team | Archers | Score | WR |
|---|---|---|---|---|
| 1 | Italy | Natalia Valeeva; Mauro Nespoli | 1336 | 10 |
| 2 | Germany | Lisa Unruh; Florian Kahllund | 1336 | 9 |
| 3 | Georgia | Khatuna Narimanidze; Lasha Pkhakadze | 1322 | 15 |
| 4 | Ukraine | Lidiia Sichenikova; Heorhiy Ivanytskyy | 1321 | 14 |
| 5 | Russia | Kristina Timofeeva; Bair Tsybekdorzhiev | 1314 | 6 |
| 6 | France | Laura Ruggieri; Pierre Plihon | 1313 | 13 |
| 7 | Turkey | Yasemin Anagöz; Yağız Yılmaz | 1310 | 28 |
| 8 | Netherlands | Shireen-Zoë de Vries; Rick van der Ven | 1309 | 35 |
| 9 | Denmark | Maja Jager; Johan Weiss | 1308 | 16 |
| 10 | Belarus | Hanna Marusava; Anton Prilepov | 1308 | 11 |
| 11 | Spain | Alicia Marín; Miguel Alvariño | 1302 | 19 |
| 12 | Poland | Wioleta Myszor; Sławomir Napłoszek | 1300 | 22 |
| 13 | Finland | Taru Kuoppa; Antti Tekoniemi | 1294 | 42 |
| 14 | Romania | Simona Băncilă; Daniel Ciornei | 1283 | 57 |
| 15 | Slovenia | Ana Umer; Rok Bizjak | 1283 | 31 |
| 16 | Great Britain | Naomi Folkard; Kieran Slater | 1278 | 12 |
| 17 | Bulgaria | Dobromira Danailova; Yavor Hristov | 1277 | 72 |
| 18 | Moldova | Alexandra Mirca; Dan Olaru | 1270 | 57 |
| 19 | Azerbaijan | Olqa Senyuk; Taras Senyuk | 1270 | 56 |
| 20 | Switzerland | Céline Schobinger; Adrian Faber | 1269 | 60 |
| 21 | Austria | Sabine Mayrhofer-Gritsch; Alexander Bertschler | 1268 | 62 |
| 22 | Slovakia | Alexandra Longová; Boris Baláž | 1265 | 43 |
| 23 | Norway | Line Ridderstrøm; Bård Nesteng | 1262 | 77 |
| 24 | Greece | Evangelina Psarra; Alexandros Karageorgiou | 1260 | 66 |
| 25 | Cyprus | Mikaella Kourouna; Mimis El Helali | 1253 | 77 |
| 26 | Estonia | Laura Nurmsalu; Jaanus Gross | 1253 | 69 |
| 27 | Ireland | Sinead Cuthbert Cunningham; Darren Wallace | 1226 | 77 |
| 28 | Latvia | Anete Kreicberga; Eduards Lapsiņš | 1193 | 72 |
| 29 | Kosovo | Lirije Sahiti; Hazir Asllani | 1000 | 77 |

== Elimination rounds ==
First Round
1 | Italy (ITA) | 2 | 2 | 2
19 | Azerbaijan (AZE) | 0 | 0 | 0
9 | Denmark (DEN) | 0 | 0 | 0
8 | Netherlands (NED) | 2 | 2 | 2
5 | Russia (RUS) | 2 | 2 | 2
12 | Poland (POL) | 0 | 0 | 0
13 | Finland (FIN) | 0 | 0 | 0
4 | Ukraine (UKR) | 2 | 2 | 2
3 | Georgia (GEO) | 2 | 0 | 1 | 2
14 | Romania (ROU) | 0 | 2 | 1 | 0
11 | Spain (ESP) | 2 | 1 | 0 | 2
6 | France (FRA) | 0 | 1 | 2 | 0
7 | Turkey (TUR) | 0 | 0 | 0
10 | Belarus (BLR) | 2 | 2 | 2
15 | Slovenia (SLO) | 0 | 2 | 2 | 2
2 | Germany (GER) | 2 | 0 | 0 | 0

Quarterfinals
1 | Italy (ITA) | 1 | 2 | 1 | 2
8 | Netherlands (NED) | 1 | 0 | 1 | 0
5 | Russia (RUS) | 0 | 0 | 0
4 | Ukraine (UKR) | 2 | 2 | 2
3 | Georgia (GEO) | 2 | 0 | 2 | 0 | 1
11 | Spain (ESP) | 0 | 2 | 0 | 2 | 0
10 | Belarus (BLR) | 0 | 2 | 0 | 0
15 | Slovenia (SLO) | 2 | 0 | 2 | 2

Semifinals
1 | Italy (ITA) | 1 | 2 | 2
4 | Ukraine (UKR) | 1 | 0 | 0
3 | Georgia (GEO) | 2 | 1 | 2
15 | Slovenia (SLO) | 0 | 1 | 0

Final
1 | Italy (ITA) | 0 | 2 | 2 | 1
3 | Georgia (GEO) | 2 | 0 | 0 | 1
Third place
4 | Ukraine (UKR) | 2 | 2 | 1
15 | Slovenia (SLO) | 0 | 0 | 1
