= Slovenia at the 2015 European Games =

- IOC code: SLO
- NOC: Olympic Committee of Slovenia
- Website: www.olympic.si

in Baku, Azerbaijan 12 – 28 June 2015
- Competitors: 81 in 16 sports
- Flag bearer: Bojan Tokič
- Medals Ranked 30th: Gold 1 Silver 1 Bronze 3 Total 5

European Games appearances (overview)
- 2015; 2019; 2023; 2027

Slovenia competed at the 2015 European Games, in Baku, Azerbaijan from 12 to 28 June 2015.

== Medalists ==
Medal	Name	Sport	Event	Date
Gold	Sašo Bertoncelj	Gymnastics	Pommel horse	20 June
Silver	Tina Trstenjak	Judo	Women's 63kg	26 June
Bronze	Anamari Velenšek	Judo	Women's 78kg	27 June
Bronze	Rok Drakšič	Judo	Men's 73kg	27 June
Bronze	Klara Apotekar; Vlora Bedeti; Nina Milošević; Petra Nareks; Anka Pogacnik; Tina Trstenjak; Anamari Velenšek; Kristina Vrsic	Judo	Women's team	28 June

== Archery ==
Athlete	Event	Ranking round		Round of 64	Round of 32	Round of 16	Quarterfinals	Semifinals	Final / BM	
Athlete	Event	Score	Seed	Opposition Score	Opposition Score	Opposition Score	Opposition Score	Opposition Score	Opposition Score	Rank
Rok Bizjak	Men's individual	647	39	Nesteng (Norway); L 0–6	Did not advance					33
Jaka Komočar	Men's individual	629	54	Yilmaz (Turkey); L 3–7	Did not advance					33
Den Habjan Malavašič	Men's individual	616	56	Dalidovich (Belarus); W 6–0	Rodriguez (Spain); W 7–1	Daniel (France); L 0–6	Did not advance			9
Ana Umer	Women's individual	636	20	Alena Tolkach (Belarus); L 5–6	Did not advance					33
Rok Bizjak; Jaka Komočar; Den Habjan Malavašič	Men's team	1892	13	—		Ukraine L 2–6	Did not advance			9
Ana Umer; Rok Bizjak	Mixed team	1283	15	—		Germany W 6–2	Belarus W 6–2	Georgia (Georgia (country)); L 1–5	Ukraine L 1–5	4

== Basketball (3x3) ==
- Men's team – Jure Eržen, Uroš Troppan, Dario Krejić, Boris Jeršin
- Women's team – Živa Zdolšek, Urša Žibert, Ana Ljubenović, Maša Piršič

== Gymnastics ==
=== Artistic ===
- Men's individual – Sašo Bertoncelj
- Women's individual – Saša Golob

== Triathlon ==
- Men's individual – Domen Dornik
- Women's individual – Eva Skaza
