= Archery at the 2015 European Games – Men's team =

Men's team at the 2015 European Games
- Venue: Tofiq Bahramov Stadium
- Date: 16–18 June
- Competitors: 39 from 13 nations

Medalists
gold medal	Heorhiy Ivanytskyy; Markiyan Ivashko; Viktor Ruban	Ukraine
silver medal	Miguel Alvariño; Juan Ignacio Rodríguez; Antonio Fernández	Spain
bronze medal	Rick van der Ven; Sjef van den Berg; Mitch Dielemans	Netherlands

The men's team archery event at the 2015 European Games in Baku was held between 16 and 18 June.

== Ranking round ==
The ranking round took place on 16 June 2015 to determine the seeding for the knockout rounds. 13 countries entered a full team complement of three archers, so all qualified for the knockout round. World rankings shown are correct at tournament start date.

Rank	Team	Archers	Score	WR
1	Netherlands	Rick van der Ven; Sjef van den Berg; Mitch Dielemans	2012	8
2	Belarus	Anton Prilepov; Pavel Dalidovich; Aliaksandr Liahusheu	2004	11
3	France	Pierre Plihon; Lucas Daniel; Jean-Charles Valladont	2003	4
4	Ukraine	Heorhiy Ivanytskyy; Markiyan Ivashko; Viktor Ruban	2003	17
5	Italy	Mauro Nespoli; David Pasqualucci; Michele Frangilli	1999	12
6	Germany	Florian Kahllund; Christian Weiss; Simon Nesemann	1985	16
7	Spain	Miguel Alvariño; Juan Ignacio Rodríguez; Antonio Fernández	1975	14
8	Russia	Bair Tsybekdorzhiev; Alexander Kozhin; Beligto Tsynguev	1970	5
9	Poland	Sławomir Napłoszek; Rafał Wojtkowiak; Marek Szafran	1960	22
10	Turkey	Yağız Yılmaz; Fatih Bozlar; Mete Gazoz	1952	24
11	Norway	Bård Nesteng; Paul André Hagen; Christoffer Furnes	1912	46
12	Azerbaijan	Taras Senyuk; Aleksey Kopnin; Roman Vengerov	1893	47
13	Slovenia	Rok Bizjak; Jaka Komočar; Den Habjan Malavašič	1892	20

== Elimination rounds ==
First Round
9	Poland (POL)	1	0	2	0
8	Russia (RUS)	1	2	0	2
5	Italy (ITA)	2	0	0	2	1
12	Azerbaijan (AZE)	0	2	2	0	0
13	Slovenia (SLO)	0	0	2	0
4	Ukraine (UKR)	2	2	0	2
11	Norway (NOR)	0	0	1
6	Germany (GER)	2	2	1
7	Spain (ESP)	2	2	0	0	1
10	Turkey (TUR)	0	0	2	2	0

Quarterfinals
1	Netherlands (NED)	2	0	2	0	1
8	Russia (RUS)	0	2	0	2	0
5	Italy (ITA)	0	2	0	0
4	Ukraine (UKR)	2	0	2	2
3	France (FRA)	2	0	1	2
6	Germany (GER)	0	2	1	0
7	Spain (ESP)	2	2	2
2	Belarus (BLR)	0	0	0

Semifinals
1	Netherlands (NED)	2	0	0	1
4	Ukraine (UKR)	0	2	2	1
3	France (FRA)	0	2	0	2	0
7	Spain (ESP)	2	0	2	0	1

Final
4	Ukraine (UKR)	0	2	0	2	1
7	Spain (ESP)	2	0	2	0	0
Third place
1	Netherlands (NED)	0	2	1	2
3	France (FRA)	2	0	1	0
