= Riau Ega Agata =

Indonesian recurve archer

Riau Ega Agata Salsabilla
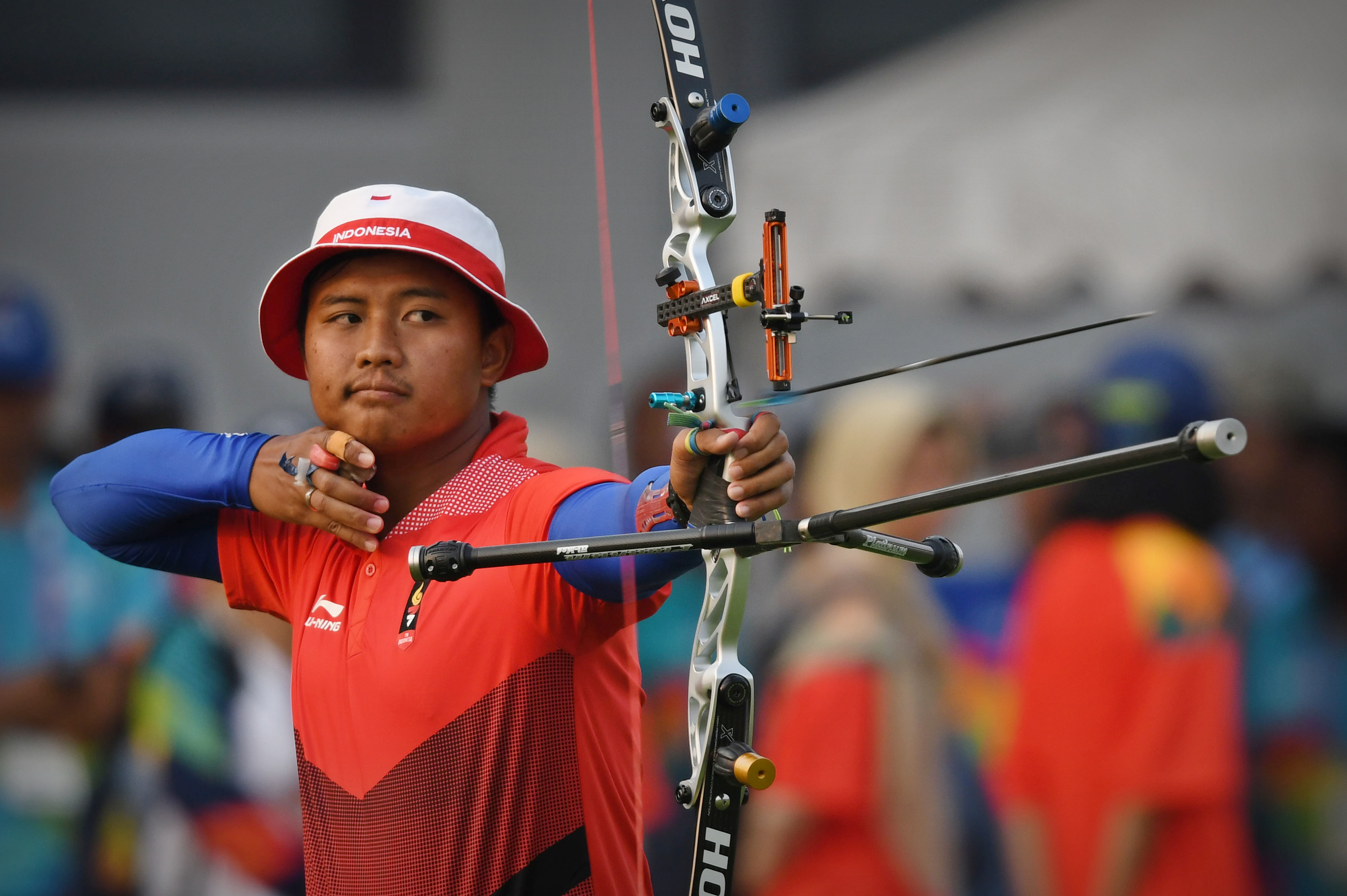
- Riau Ega at the 2018 Asian Games

Personal information
- Born: 25 November 1991 (age 34) Blitar, East Java, Indonesia
- Education: Management science Narotama University
- Height: 1.75 m (5 ft 9 in)
- Weight: 70 kg (154 lb)

Sport
- Country: Indonesia
- Sport: Archery
- Event: recurve
Medal record
Men's recurve archery
Representing Indonesia
| Event | 1st | 2nd | 3rd |
|---|---|---|---|
| World Cup | 0 | 0 | 3 |
| Asian Games | 0 | 0 | 3 |
| Asian Championships | 0 | 0 | 1 |
| Asia Cup | 0 | 3 | 0 |
| Asian Grand Prix | 0 | 3 | 0 |
| Islamic Solidarity Games | 2 | 1 | 0 |
| SEA Games | 8 | 3 | 4 |
| ASEAN University Games | 3 | 0 | 0 |
| Total | 13 | 10 | 11 |
World Cup
| Bronze medal – third place | 2015 Shanghai | Individual |
| Bronze medal – third place | 2015 Shanghai | Men's team |
| Bronze medal – third place | 2018 Shanghai | Mixed team |
Asian Games
| Bronze medal – third place | 2018 Jakarta–Palembang | Individual |
| Bronze medal – third place | 2022 Hangzhou | Men's team |
| Bronze medal – third place | 2022 Hangzhou | Mixed team |
Asian Championships
| Bronze medal – third place | 2023 Bangkok | Men's team |
Asia Cup
| Silver medal – second place | 2016 Bangkok | Men's team |
| Silver medal – second place | 2016 Bangkok | Mixed team |
| Silver medal – second place | 2018 Bangkok | Mixed team |
Asian Grand Prix
| Silver medal – second place | 2011 Vientiane | Individual |
| Silver medal – second place | 2011 Vientiane | Men's team |
| Silver medal – second place | 2015 Bangkok | Mixed team |
Islamic Solidarity Games
| Gold medal – first place | 2013 Palembang | Mixed team |
| Gold medal – first place | 2021 Konya | Mixed team |
| Silver medal – second place | 2021 Konya | Men's team |
SEA Games
| Gold medal – first place | 2011 Jakarta–Palembang | Mixed team |
| Gold medal – first place | 2015 Singapore | Mixed team |
| Gold medal – first place | 2017 Kuala Lumpur | Mixed team |
| Gold medal – first place | 2019 Philippines | Men's team |
| Gold medal – first place | 2021 Vietnam | Men's team |
| Gold medal – first place | 2021 Vietnam | Mixed team |
| Gold medal – first place | 2025 Thailand | Individual |
| Gold medal – first place | 2025 Thailand | Men's team |
| Silver medal – second place | 2015 Singapore | Men's team |
| Silver medal – second place | 2019 Philippines | Mixed team |
| Silver medal – second place | 2021 Vietnam | Individual |
| Bronze medal – third place | 2013 Naypyidaw | Men's team |
| Bronze medal – third place | 2013 Naypyidaw | Mixed team |
| Bronze medal – third place | 2019 Philippines | Individual |
| Bronze medal – third place | 2025 Thailand | Mixed team |
ASEAN University Games
| Gold medal – first place | 2014 Palembang | Individual |
| Gold medal – first place | 2014 Palembang | Men's team |
| Gold medal – first place | 2014 Palembang | Mixed team |

Riau Ega Agata Salsabilla (born 25 November 1991) is an Indonesian recurve archer. He represented Indonesia at the 2016 and 2020 Summer Olympics.

== Career ==
At the 2013 Islamic Solidarity Games, Ega won gold along with partner Ika Yuliana Rochmawati in the mixed team recurve category. He competed in the individual recurve event and the team recurve event at the 2015 World Archery Championships in Copenhagen, Denmark.

=== 2015 SEA Games ===
In the 2015 SEA Games, Ega won silver in the men's team recurve event, along with Hendra Purnama & Muhammad Hanif Wijaya. In the mixed team recurve event, he along with partner Ika Yuliana Rochmawati won the gold medal.

=== 2016 Summer Olympics ===
Ega, along with compatriot Hendra Purnama & Muhammad Hanif Wijaya, qualified for the 2016 Summer Olympics in Rio de Janeiro. The three of them would be competing in the men's individual and team category.

In the men's team category, the Indonesia team scored a total of 1962 from 216 arrows in the ranking round, scoring 48 10s and 23 Xs, the team managed to rank ten out of twelve teams overall. In the 1/8 Eliminations, the team met seventh-ranked Chinese Taipei, consisting of Kao Hao-wen, Wei Chun-heng, and Yu Guan-lin. Indonesia went on to win 6–2 after two wins and two ties. In the Quarterfinals, they were put up against second-ranked United States, consisting of Brady Ellison, Zach Garrett, and Jake Kaminski. Indonesia went on to lose 2–6 after they had equalized points 2–2 in the second set.

In the men's individual, Ega ranked 32 out of 64 participants, scoring a total of 660 from 72 arrows with 26 10s and 7 Xs. He met Xing Yu of China in the first round, and went on to win 7–1. He then was put up against first-ranked Kim Woo-jin of South Korea, who had just broken the world record the previous day in the ranking round. However, in an upset, Ega Agatha won the match 6–2 against the world champion. He went on until the Round of 16, where he was beaten by Italy's Mauro Nespoli, who had beaten Ega Agatha's compatriot Muhammad Hanif Wijaya earlier on.

=== 2020 Summer Olympics ===
Ega, along with compatriot Arif Dwi Pangestu and Alviyanto Prastyadi, qualified for the 2020 Summer Olympics in Tokyo, Japan. The three of them competed in the men's individual and team category. He also played in the mixed team category along with partner Diananda Choirunisa.
