= Archery at the 2016 Summer Olympics – Men's team =

Men's team at the Games of the XXXI Olympiad
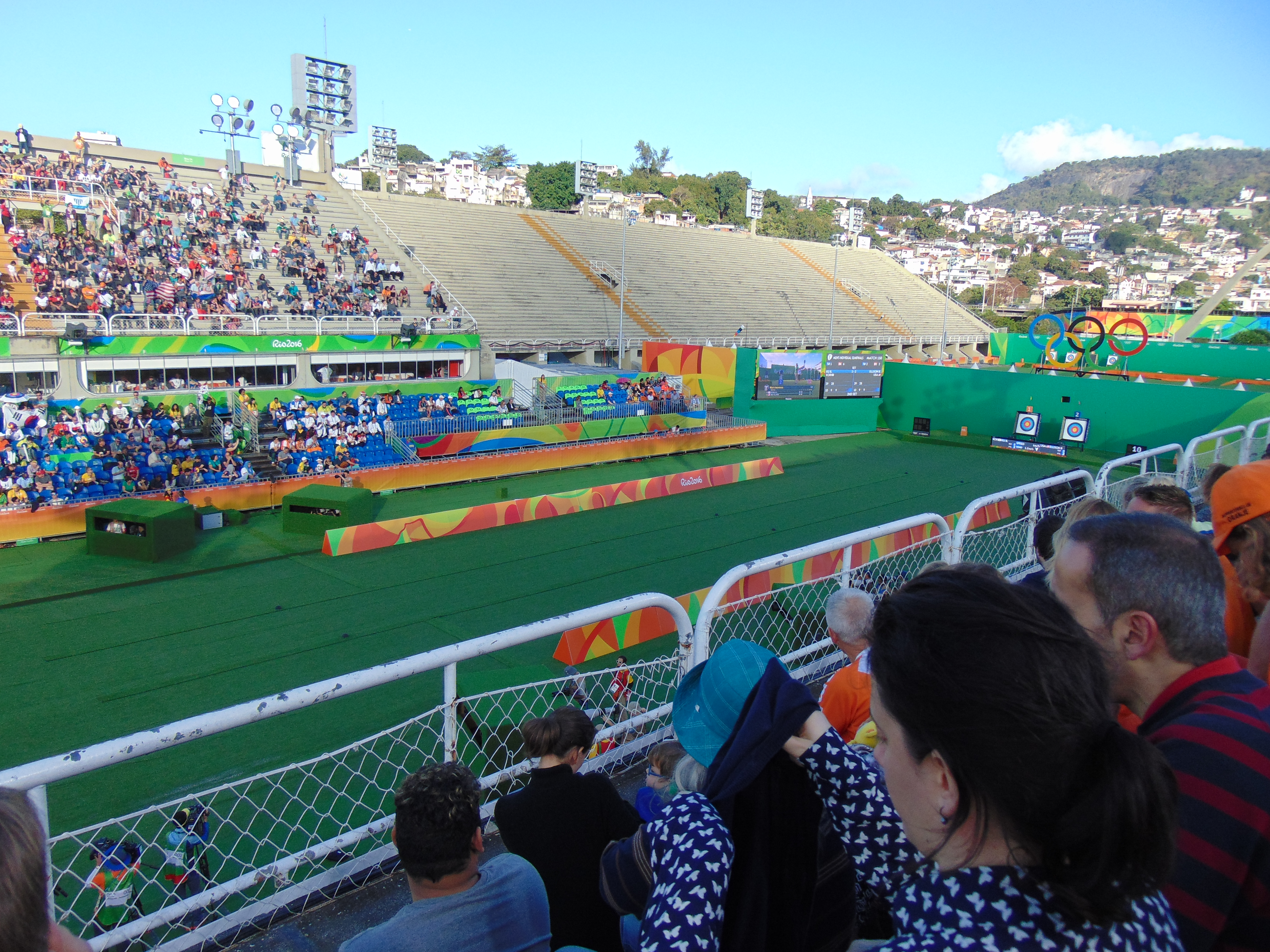
- The Sambadrome, where the event took place, during the 2016 Summer Olympics
- Venue: Sambadrome Marquês de Sapucaí
- Date: 6 August 2016
- Competitors: 36 from 12 nations

Medalists
| 1st place, gold medalist(s) | | Kim Woo-jin; Ku Bon-chan; Lee Seung-yun | South Korea |
| 2nd place, silver medalist(s) | | Brady Ellison; Zach Garrett; Jake Kaminski | United States |
| 3rd place, bronze medalist(s) | | Alec Potts; Ryan Tyack; Taylor Worth | Australia |

The men's team archery event was one of 4 archery events at the 2016 Summer Olympics.

== Competition format ==
As with the other archery events, the men's team was a recurve archery event, held under the World Archery-approved 70-meter distance and rules. 12 teams of 3 archers each participated. Competition began with a ranking round, in which each archer shot 72 arrows (this was the same ranking round used for the individual event). The combined scores from the ranking round were used to seed the teams into a single-elimination bracket, with the top 4 teams receiving a bye into the second round (quarterfinals). Each match consisted of four sets of 6 arrows, two per archer. The team with the highest score in the set – the total of the six arrows – received two set points; if the teams were tied, each received one set point. The first team to five set points won the match.

== Schedule ==
All times are Brasília Time (UTC−3).

| Day | Date | Start | Finish | Event | Phase |
|---|---|---|---|---|---|
| Day 1 | Saturday 6 August 2016 | 9:00 | 17:45 | Men's team | Eliminations/Medal round |

== Records ==
Prior to this competition, the existing world and Olympic records were as follows. The ranking round records were broken during the 2012 competition by the South Korean team.

- 216 arrow ranking round

| World record | South Korea; Im Dong-hyun, Kim Bub-min, Oh Jin-hyek | 2087 | London, United Kingdom | 27 July 2012 |
| Olympic record | South Korea; Im Dong-hyun, Kim Bub-min, Oh Jin-hyek | 2087 | London, United Kingdom | 27 July 2012 |

== Results ==
=== Ranking round ===
| Rank | Nation | Archer | Score | 10s | Xs |
|---|---|---|---|---|---|
| 1 | South Korea | Kim Woo-jin; Ku Bon-chan; Lee Seung-yun | 2057 | 73 | 50 |
| 2 | United States | Brady Ellison; Zach Garrett; Jake Kaminski | 2024 | 68 | 44 |
| 3 | Italy | Marco Galiazzo; Mauro Nespoli; David Pasqualucci | 2007 | 71 | 23 |
| 4 | Australia | Alec Potts; Ryan Tyack; Taylor Worth | 2005 | 64 | 41 |
| 5 | France | Lucas Daniel; Pierre Plihon; Jean-Charles Valladont | 2003 | 61 | 23 |
| 6 | China | Gu Xuesong; Wang Dapeng; Xing Yu | 1997 | 62 | 30 |
| 7 | Chinese Taipei | Kao Hao-wen; Wei Chun-heng; Yu Guan-lin | 1995 | 53 | 32 |
| 8 | Spain | Miguel Alvariño; Antonio Fernández; Juan Ignacio Rodríguez | 1986 | 59 | 39 |
| 9 | Netherlands | Sjef van den Berg; Mitch Dielemans; Rick van der Ven | 1981 | 67 | 23 |
| 10 | Indonesia | Riau Ega Agatha; Hendra Purnama; Muhammad Wijaya | 1962 | 48 | 23 |
| 11 | Brazil | Marcus Vinicius D'Almeida; Bernardo Oliveira; Daniel Rezende Xavier | 1948 | 44 | 23 |
| 12 | Malaysia | Haziq Kamaruddin; Khairul Anuar Mohamad; Muhammad Akmal Nor Hasrin | 1945 | 43 | 32 |

=== Competition bracket ===
1/8 eliminations
9 | Netherlands | 5 | 57 | 57 | 52
8 | Spain | 1 | 54 | 52 | 52
5 | France | 6 | 53 | 55 | 55 | 57
12 | Malaysia | 2 | 55 | 53 | 53 | 53
11 | Brazil | 2 | 51 | 53 | 56 | 53
6 | China | 6 | 54 | 57 | 53 | 58
7 | Chinese Taipei | 2 | 51 | 56 | 56 | 51
10 | Indonesia | 6 | 55 | 56 | 56 | 53

Quarterfinals
1 | South Korea | 6 | 55 | 59 | 57
9 | Netherlands | 0 | 52 | 54 | 54
5 | France | 3 | 57 | 54 | 52 | 50
4 | Australia | 5 | 52 | 54 | 56 | 54
3 | Italy | 0 | 51 | 48 | 53
6 | China | 6 | 55 | 56 | 56
10 | Indonesia | 2 | 51 | 57 | 56 | 51
2 | United States | 6 | 57 | 54 | 57 | 56

Semifinals
1 | South Korea | 6 | 59 | 59 | 56
4 | Australia | 0 | 57 | 58 | 54
6 | China | 0 | 53 | 56 | 53
2 | United States | 6 | 57 | 58 | 55

Gold medal match
1 | South Korea | 6 | 60 | 58 | 59
2 | United States | 0 | 57 | 57 | 56
Bronze medal match
4 | Australia | 6 | 56 | 56 | 54 | 59
6 | China | 2 | 55 | 53 | 57 | 54

- The figure in italics signifies the set scores.
