= Archery at the 2023 European Games – Men's team recurve =

Men's team recurve at the 2023 European Games
- Venue: Plaszowianka Archery Park
- Date: 23–24 June
- Competitors: 24 from 8 nations
- Teams: 8

Medalists
gold medal	Federico Musolesi; Mauro Nespoli; Alessandro Paoli	Italy
silver medal	Pablo Acha; Miguel Alvariño; Andrés Temiño	Spain
bronze medal	Keziah Chabin; Florian Faber; Thomas Rufer	Switzerland

The men's team recurve competition at the 2023 European Games was held from 23 to 24 June 2023 at the Plaszowianka Archery Park in Kraków.

== Records ==
Prior to the competition, the existing world, European and Games records were as follows:

- 216 arrow ranking round

World record	South Korea; Im Dong-hyun; Kim Bub-min; Oh Jin-hyek	2087	London, Great Britain	27 July 2012
European record	Netherlands; Rick van der Ven; Sjef van den Berg; Steve Wijler	2045	Bucharest, Romania	10 April 2019
Games record	France; Thomas Chirault; Pierre Plihon; Jean-Charles Valladont	2024	Minsk, Belarus	21 June 2019

== Results ==
=== Qualification round ===
Rank	Nation	Archer	Individual total	Team total
1	Netherlands	Gijs Broeksma; Senna Roos; Steve Wijler	675; 680; 678	2033 GR
2	France	Baptiste Addis; Nicolas Bernardi; Jean-Charles Valladont	683; 662; 679	2024
3	Spain	Pablo Acha; Miguel Alvariño; Andrés Temiño	673; 676; 674	2023
4	Italy	Federico Musolesi; Mauro Nespoli; Alessandro Paoli	671; 673; 676	2020
5	Great Britain	Monty Orton; Alex Wise; James Woodgate	683; 663; 654	2000
6	Ukraine	Oleksii Hunbin; Ivan Kozhokar; Artem Ovchynnikov	664; 676; 657	1997
7	Switzerland	Keziah Chabin; Florian Faber; Thomas Rufer	665; 659; 647	1971
8	Poland	Oskar Kasprowski; Sławomir Napłoszek; Kacper Sierakowski	648; 636; 657	1941

=== Elimination round ===
Quarterfinals
1	Netherlands	6	53	55	56	58
8	Poland	2	50	57	53	57
5	Great Britain	1	53	54	57
4	Italy	5	53	58	59
3	Spain	5	55	55	55
6	Ukraine	1	52	54	55
7	Switzerland	5	56	54	54	54	29
2	France	4	52	59	52	55	28

Semifinals
1	Netherlands	4	57	58	55	55	28
4	Italy	5	56	57	58	56	30
3	Spain	5	56	57	56
7	Switzerland	1	55	54	56

Gold medal match
4	Italy	5	56	55	58
3	Spain	1	55	55	55
Bronze medal match
1	Netherlands	2	56	55	56	55
7	Switzerland	6	49	57	58	56
