= Norway at the 2015 European Games =

- IOC code: NOR
- NOC: Norwegian Olympic and Paralympic Committee and Confederation of Sports
- Website: www.idrettsforbundet.no

in Baku, Azerbaijan 12 – 28 June 2015
- Competitors: 57 in 14 sports
- Flag bearer: Grace Bullen
- Medals Ranked 38th: Gold 0 Silver 0 Bronze 2 Total 2

European Games appearances (overview)
- 2015; 2019; 2023; 2027

Norway competed at the 2015 European Games, in Baku, Azerbaijan from 12 to 28 June 2015.

The 57 Norwegian athletes were presented at 27 April 2015.

== Medalists ==
Medal	Name	Sport	Event	Date
Bronze	Grace Bullen	Wrestling	Women's freestyle 58 kg	16 June
Bronze	Bartosz Piasecki	Fencing	Men's individual épée	24 June

== Archery ==
Athlete	Event	Ranking round		Round of 64	Round of 32	Round of 16	Quarterfinals	Semifinals	Final / BM	
Athlete	Event	Score	Seed	Opposition Score	Opposition Score	Opposition Score	Opposition Score	Opposition Score	Opposition Score	Rank
Bård Nesteng	Men's individual	658	26	Bizjak (Slovenia); W 6–0	Prilepov (Belarus); L 0–6	Did not advance				17
Paul André Hagen	Men's individual	646	41	Rodriguez (Spain); L 2–6	Did not advance					33
Christoffer Furnes	Men's individual	608	59	Plihon (France); L 2–6	Did not advance					33
Line Blomén Ridderstrøm	Women's individual	604	52	Anagoz (Turkey); L 2–6	Did not advance					33
Bård Nesteng; Paul André Hagen; Christoffer Furnes	Men's team	1912	11	—		Germany L 1–5	Did not advance			9
Line Blomén Ridderstrøm; Bård Nesteng	Mixed team	1262	23	—		Did not advance				23

== Boxing ==
- Men's 64 kg – Salavat Khatuev

== Canoe sprint ==
- Men's – Daniel Salbu
- Women's – Mira Verås Larsen

== Cycling ==
=== BMX ===
- Men's race – Tore Navrestad

=== Mountain biking ===
- Men's race – Sondre Kristiansen

=== Road ===
- Men's time trial – Reidar Bohlin Borgersen
- Women's road race – Miriam Bjørnsrud, Cecilie Gotaas Johnsen
- Women's time trial – Cecilie Gotaas Johnsen

== Diving ==
- Women's – Julie Synnøve Thorsen, Anne Vilde Tuxen

== Gymnastics ==
=== Artistic ===
- Men's – Pietro Giachino, Marcus Konradi, Stian Skjerahaug
- Women's – Sofie Bråthen, Dina Nygaard, Martine Rustøen Skregelid

== Fencing ==
- Men's individual épée – Bartosz Piasecki

== Karate ==
- Women's – Bettina Alstadsæther

== Shooting ==
- Men's rifle – Ole Magnus Bakken, Stian Bogar, Odd Arne Brekne, Ole-Kristian Bryhn, Are Hansen
- Men's pistol – Pål Hembre
- Men's skeet – Tore Brovold
- Women's rifle – Malin Westerheim

== Swimming ==
Men's – Eivind Bjelland, Ole-Mikal Fløgstad, Erik Årsland Gidskehaug, Marius Solaat Rødland, Mads Henry Steinland Women's – Sigurd Holten Bøen, Ariel Braathen, Marte Løvberg

== Taekwondo ==
- Men's – Richard Ordemann
- Women's – Tina Røe Skaar

== Triathlon ==
- Men's – Kristian Blummenfelt, Gustav Iden
- Women's – Lotte Miller

== Volleyball ==
=== Beach ===
- Men's tournament – Øivind Hordvik/Morten Kvamsdal
- Women's tournament – Victoria Faye Kjølberg/Janne Kongshavn Hordvik

== Wrestling ==
Men's Greco-Roman

- Felix Baldauf
- Stig André Berge
- Petter Karlsen
- Marius Thommesen
- Rasmus Tjørstad

Women's freestyle

- Grace Bullen
