= Archery at the 2016 Summer Olympics – Men's individual =

Men's individual at the Games of the XXXI Olympiad
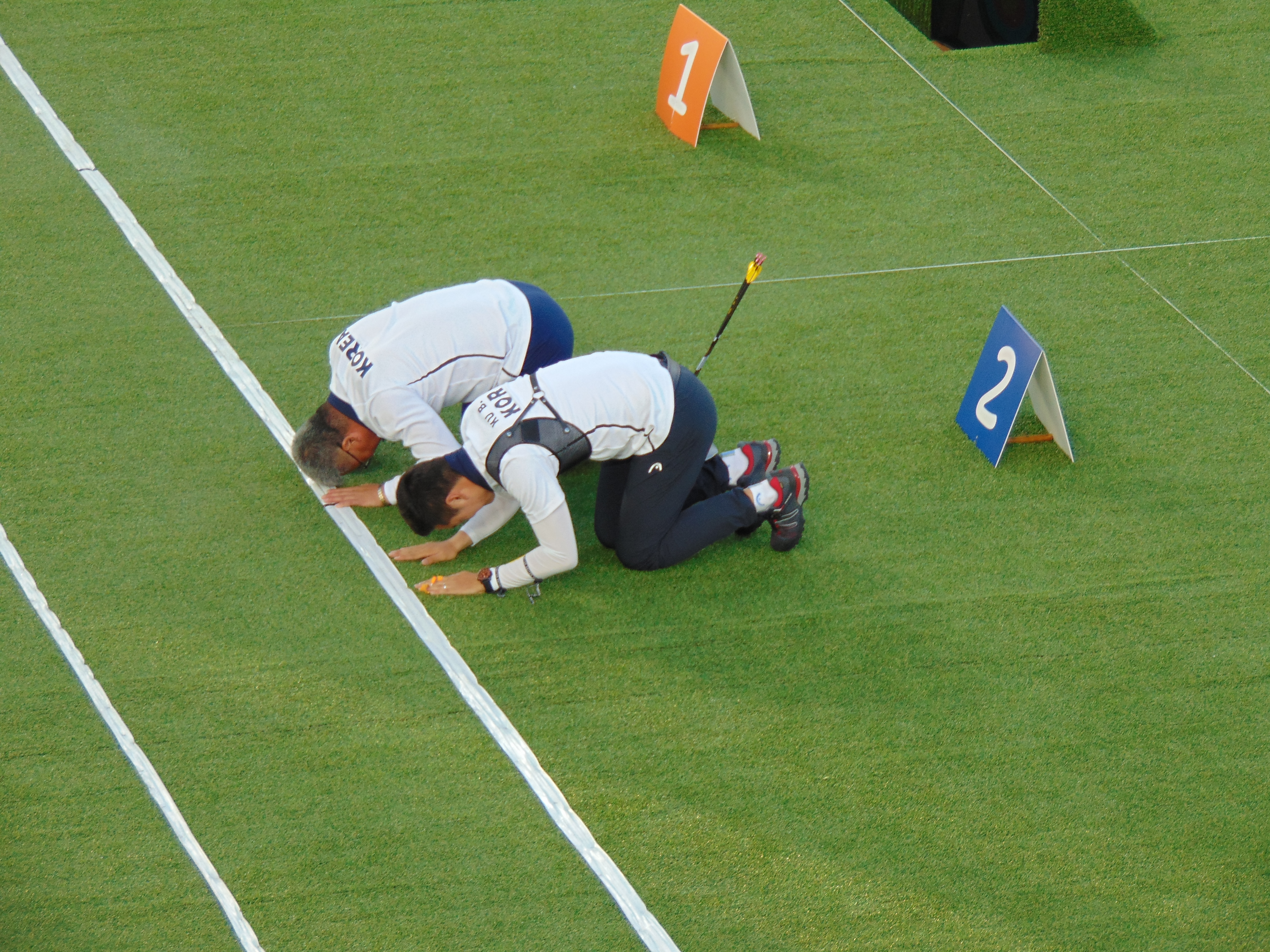
- Gold medallist Ku Bon-chan and coach Park Chae-soon celebrate after winning the final
- Venue: Sambadrome Marquês de Sapucaí
- Date: 5–12 August 2016
- Competitors: 64 from 40 nations

Medalists
1st place, gold medalist(s)		Ku Bon-chan	South Korea
2nd place, silver medalist(s)		Jean-Charles Valladont	France
3rd place, bronze medalist(s)		Brady Ellison	United States

The men's individual archery event was one of 4 archery events at the 2016 Summer Olympics.

The medals were presented by Uğur Erdener, IOC member, Turkey and Tom Dielen, Secretary General of the World Archery Federation.

== Competition format ==
As with the other archery events, the men's individual was a recurve archery event, held under the World Archery-approved 70-meter distance and rules. 64 archers participated. Competition began with a ranking round, in which each archer shot 72 arrows. The scores from the ranking round were used to seed the archers into a single-elimination bracket. The knockout matches used the set system introduced in 2012. Each match consisted of up to 5 sets of 3 arrows per archer. The archer with the best score in each set won the set, earning 2 points. If the score was tied, each archer received 1 point. The first archer to 6 points won the match. If the match was tied 5-5 after 5 sets, a single tie-breaker arrow was used with the closest to center winning.

== Schedule ==
All times are Brasília Time (UTC−3).

Day	Date	Start	Finish	Event	Phase
Day 0	Friday 5 August 2016	9:00		Men's individual	Ranking round
Day 3	Monday 8 August 2016	9:00	17:45	Men's individual	1/32 & 1/16 Eliminations
Day 4	Tuesday 9 August 2016	9:00	17:45	Men's individual	1/32 & 1/16 Eliminations
Day 5	Wednesday 10 August 2016	9:00	18:55	Men's individual	1/32 & 1/16 Eliminations
Day 7	Friday 12 August 2016	9:00	17:10	Men's individual	1/8 Eliminations/Quarter/Semi finals/Medal round

== Records ==
Prior to the competition, the world and Olympic records were as follows. Kim Woo-jin broke both records.

- 72 arrow ranking round

World record	Im Dong-hyun (KOR)	699	London, United Kingdom	27 July 2012
Olympic record	Im Dong-hyun (KOR)	699	London, United Kingdom	27 July 2012

== Results ==
=== Ranking round ===
Rank	Archer	Nation	Score	10s	Xs
1	Kim Woo-jin	South Korea	700 (WR, OR)	52	26
2	Brady Ellison	United States	690	44	19
3	David Pasqualucci	Italy	685	40	11
4	Sjef van den Berg	Netherlands	684	42	11
5	Atanu Das	India	683	39	16
6	Ku Bon-chan	South Korea	681	36	16
7	Takaharu Furukawa	Japan	680	38	13
8	Jean-Charles Valladont	France	680	36	11
9	Wei Chun-heng	Chinese Taipei	679	38	13
10	Juan Ignacio Rodríguez	Spain	678	39	12
11	Florian Floto	Germany	677	34	15
12	Lee Seung-yun	South Korea	676	35	8
13	Ricardo Soto	Chile	675	36	8
14	Taylor Worth	Australia	674	39	19
15	Zach Garrett	United States	674	38	18
16	Mauro Nespoli	Italy	671	33	8
17	Gu Xuesong	China	670	35	11
18	Crispin Duenas	Canada	669	33	11
19	Wang Dapeng	China	667	29	9
20	Alec Potts	Australia	666	37	13
21	Lucas Daniel	France	666	24	5
22	Khairul Anuar Mohamad	Malaysia	665	33	14
23	Ryan Tyack	Australia	665	29	9
24	Jantsangiin Gantögs	Mongolia	664	33	12
25	Viktor Ruban	Ukraine	663	31	9
26	Bård Nesteng	Norway	663	30	10
27	Rick van der Ven	Netherlands	663	28	7
28	Ernesto Boardman	Mexico	662	25	9
29	Mete Gazoz	Turkey	661	31	9
30	Kao Hao-wen	Chinese Taipei	661	25	12
31	Jake Kaminski	United States	660	30	7
32	Xing Yu	China	660	28	10
33	Riau Ega Agatha	Indonesia	660	26	7
34	Marcus Vinicius D'Almeida	Brazil	658	24	6
35	Antonio Fernández	Spain	657	32	15
36	Pierre Plihon	France	657	24	7
37	Adrián Puentes	Cuba	656	27	10
38	Patrick Huston	Great Britain	656	22	4
39	Yu Guan-lin	Chinese Taipei	655	22	7
40	Hendra Purnama	Indonesia	655	22	7
41	Witthaya Thamwong	Thailand	655	21	11
42	Robin Ramaekers	Belgium	654	25	13
43	Andrés Pila	Colombia	654	25	9
44	Miguel Alvariño	Spain	651	27	12
45	Bernardo Oliveira	Brazil	651	24	11
46	Elías Malavé	Venezuela	651	23	11
47	Marco Galiazzo	Italy	651	21	4
48	Sultan Duzelbayev	Kazakhstan	648	29	9
49	Muhammad Wijaya	Indonesia	647	23	9
50	Haziq Kamaruddin	Malaysia	645	23	12
51	Ahmed El-Nemr	Egypt	644	20	5
52	Anton Prylepau	Belarus	643	22	6
53	Daniel Rezende Xavier	Brazil	639	19	6
54	Samuli Piippo	Finland	636	19	6
55	Muhammad Akmal Nor Hasrin	Malaysia	635	19	6
56	Rob Elder	Fiji	635	19	2
57	Philippe Kouassi	Ivory Coast	634	22	8
58	Mitch Dielemans	Netherlands	634	20	5
59	Boris Baláž	Slovakia	631	18	4
60	Jitbahadur Muktan	Nepal	607	12	4
61	Arne Jensen	Tonga	604	11	3
62	Areneo David	Malawi	603	17	3
63	Ali El Ghrari	Libya	568	11	3
64	Gavin Sutherland	Zimbabwe	566	7	0

- WR: World record
- OR: Olympic record

=== Competition bracket ===
==== Section 1 ====
Round of 64
1	W-j Kim (KOR)	6	27	28	28
64	G Sutherland (ZIM)	0	22	26	25
33	R Ega Agatha (INA)	7	27	27	27	28
32	Y Xing (CHN)	1	25	24	27	26
17	X Gu (CHN)	4	25	28	27	29	26
48	S Duzelbayev (KAZ)	6	27	27	30	28	27
49	M Wijaya (INA)	3	25	25	29	29	26
16	M Nespoli (ITA)	7	27	29	29	28	27
9	C-h Wei (TPE)	6	29	27	29
56	R Elder (FIJ)	0	26	24	25
41	W Thamwong (THA)	7	26	28	28	29	28
24	G Jantsan (MGL)	3	27	25	28	26	26
25	V Ruban (UKR)	7	26	29	24	25	25
40	H Purnama (INA)	3	26	26	27	24	24
57	P Kouassi (CIV)	4	22	26	29	18	21
8	J-C Valladont (FRA)	6	23	25	28	28	25

Round of 32
1	W-j Kim (KOR)	2	29	27	24	27
33	R Ega Agatha (INA)	6	27	28	27	28
48	S Duzelbayev (KAZ)	0	25	25	25
16	M Nespoli (ITA)	6	28	29	28
9	C-h Wei (TPE)	5^{10}	26	27	27	29	27
41	W Thamwong (THA)	6^{10+}	28	27	25	25	28
25	V Ruban (UKR)	0	23	23	20
8	J-C Valladont (FRA)	6	24	26	25

Round of 16
33	R Ega Agatha (INA)	0	25	27	26
16	M Nespoli (ITA)	6	29	29	27
41	W Thamwong (THA)	0	26	26	28
8	J-C Valladont (FRA)	6	29	29	29

Quarter-finals
16	M Nespoli (ITA)	5^{8}	27	27	28	26	29
8	J-C Valladont (FRA)	6^{10}	26	27	29	29	28

==== Section 2 ====
Round of 64
5	A Das (IND)	6	29	29	30
60	J Muktan (NEP)	0	26	24	26
37	A Puentes (CUB)	6	25	23	26	27	28
28	E Boardman (MEX)	4	24	26	27	26	24
21	L Daniel (FRA)	0	23	28	27
44	M Alvariño (ESP)	6	26	29	29
53	D Rezende Xavier (BRA)	2	22	27	28	26
12	S-y Lee (KOR)	6	28	30	27	28
13	R Soto (CHI)	6^{10+}	27	26	27	29	27
52	A Prylepau (BLR)	5^{10}	27	27	27	27	27
45	B Oliveira (BRA)	6	26	25	27	27	27
20	A Potts (AUS)	4	26	27	27	26	26
29	M Gazoz (TUR)	6^{9}	21	23	27	23	25
36	P Plihon (FRA)	5^{6}	25	26	26	23	23
61	A Jensen (TGA)	3	23	26	28	25	27
4	S van den Berg (NED)	7	26	27	27	25	28

Round of 32
5	A Das (IND)	6	28	29	26	27	29
37	A Puentes (CUB)	4	25	26	27	28	28
44	M Alvariño (ESP)	1	27	23	29	27
12	S-y Lee (KOR)	7	28	29	29	28
13	R Soto (CHI)	7	26	26	27	28
45	B Oliveira (BRA)	1	25	26	24	27
29	M Gazoz (TUR)	3	29	28	25	27	25
4	S van den Berg (NED)	7	29	27	26	28	28

Round of 16
5	A Das (IND)	4	28	30	27	27	28
12	S-y Lee (KOR)	6	30	28	27	28	28
13	R Soto (CHI)	5^{9,9}	27	26	28	30	28
4	S van den Berg (NED)	6^{9,9+}	27	29	29	28	26

Quarter-finals
12	S-y Lee (KOR)	4	29	28	27	28	29
4	S van den Berg (NED)	6	28	29	28	27	30

==== Section 3 ====
Round of 64
3	D Pasqualucci (ITA)	6	27	22	27
62	A David (MAW)	0	23	17	21
35	A Fernández (ESP)	6	29	26	28
30	H-w Kao (TPE)	0	25	23	24
19	D Wang (CHN)	2	24	25	26	26
46	E Malavé (VEN)	6	27	24	28	28
51	A El-Nemr (EGY)	0	24	23	24
14	T Worth (AUS)	6	26	27	29
11	F Floto (GER)	6	29	29	28
54	S Piippo (FIN)	0	24	26	24
43	A Pila (COL)	0	24	22	25
22	KA Mohamad (MAS)	6	25	25	28
27	R van der Ven (NED)	4	26	28	27	28	27
38	P Huston (GBR)	6	27	26	28	27	28
59	B Baláž (SVK)	0	27	27	21
6	B-c Ku (KOR)	6	29	28	29

Round of 32
3	D Pasqualucci (ITA)	2	27	29	25	28
35	A Fernández (ESP)	6	28	24	26	29
46	E Malavé (VEN)	4	28	26	26	28	29
14	T Worth (AUS)	6	24	29	27	27	30
11	F Floto (GER)	6	26	23	29	28	30
22	KA Mohamad (MAS)	4	27	27	27	25	29
38	P Huston (GBR)	0	27	26	28
6	B-c Ku (KOR)	6	29	28	29

Round of 16
35	A Fernández (ESP)	3	26	27	26	29	27
14	T Worth (AUS)	7	27	27	27	26	29
11	F Floto (GER)	4	28	27	28	26	29
6	B-c Ku (KOR)	6	29	27	27	30	29

Quarter-finals
14	T Worth (AUS)	5^{9}	28	27	29	27	26
6	B-c Ku (KOR)	6^{10}	26	30	27	30	26

==== Section 4 ====
Round of 64
7	T Furukawa (JPN)	7	27	27	24	28
58	M Dielemans (NED)	1	24	27	21	24
39	G-l Yu (TPE)	5^{9}	24	26	28	26	27
26	B Nesteng (NOR)	6^{10}	27	26	26	26	24
23	R Tyack (AUS)	2	27	25	26	25
42	R Ramaekers (BEL)	6	26	26	28	30
55	MA Nor Hasrin (MAS)	0	22	24	23
10	JI Rodríguez (ESP)	6	30	26	30
15	Z Garrett (USA)	6	28	29	27
50	H Kamaruddin (MAS)	0	26	26	26
47	M Galiazzo (ITA)	5^{9}	26	25	29	28	28
18	C Duenas (CAN)	6^{10}	27	27	28	27	28
31	J Kaminski (USA)	6	28	26	29	29
34	MV D'Almeida (BRA)	2	23	28	28	26
63	A El Ghrari (LBA)	0	27	23	20
2	B Ellison (USA)	6	29	30	30

Round of 32
7	T Furukawa (JPN)	6	26	29	29
26	B Nesteng (NOR)	0	23	27	28
42	R Ramaekers (BEL)	0	29	25	26
10	JI Rodríguez (ESP)	6	30	29	29
15	Z Garrett (USA)	7	29	29	25	27	29
18	C Duenas (CAN)	3	27	28	30	27	28
31	J Kaminski (USA)	2	26	29	25	28
2	B Ellison (USA)	6	27	27	30	29

Round of 16
7	T Furukawa (JPN)	7	27	29	28	25	29
10	JI Rodríguez (ESP)	3	27	27	26	27	28
15	Z Garrett (USA)	4	29	28	29	21	29
2	B Ellison (USA)	6	29	29	28	28	29

Quarter-finals
7	T Furukawa (JPN)	2	27	25	27	29
2	B Ellison (USA)	6	27	28	28	29

==== Finals ====
Semi-finals
8	Jean-Charles Valladont (FRA)	7	26	25	28	26	29
4	Sjef van den Berg (NED)	3	28	25	25	24	26
6	Ku Bon-chan (KOR)	6^{9}	29	28	29	27	28
2	Brady Ellison (USA)	5^{8}	29	28	29	26	29

Gold medal match
8	Jean-Charles Valladont (FRA) (silver)	3	28	26	29	29	26
6	Ku Bon-chan (KOR) (gold)	7	30	28	29	28	27
Bronze medal match
4	Sjef van den Berg (NED)	2	26	27	28	25
2	Brady Ellison (USA) (bronze)	6	27	26	30	28
