= Oibek Saidiyev =

Kazakhstani archer

Personal information
- Born: 11 July 1987 (age 38)

Sport
- Country: Kazakhstan
- Sport: Archery
- Event: recurve
Medal record
Men's recurve archery
Representing Kazakhstan
Asian Championships
Bronze medal – third place	2011 Tehran	Team

Oibek Saidiyev (born 11 July 1987) is a male Kazakhstani recurve archer. He competed in the individual recurve event and the team recurve event at the 2015 World Archery Championships in Copenhagen, Denmark.
