= Yu Guan-lin =

Taiwanese archer (born 1993)

Personal information
- Full name: Yu Guan-lin
- Born: 29 November 1993 (age 32) Taipei, Taiwan
- Height: 1.71 m (5 ft 7 in)
- Weight: 58 kg (128 lb)

Sport
- Country: Chinese Taipei
- Sport: Archery
- Event: Recurve
Medal record
Men's archery
Representing Chinese Taipei
World Championships
Bronze medal – third place	2021 Yankton	Team
Summer Universiade
Silver medal – second place	2015 Gwangju	Team
- Updated on 29 July 2023

Yu Guan-lin (Chinese: 余冠燐; pinyin: Yú Guānlín; born 29 November 1993) is a Taiwanese competitive archer. He won a bronze medal in the men's team recurve at the 2015 Asian Championships, and also competed as a member of Chinese Taipei's archery squad at the 2016 Summer Olympics.

Yu was selected to compete for the Taiwanese squad at the 2016 Summer Olympics in Rio de Janeiro, shooting both in individual and team recurve tournaments. First, Yu amassed a total of 679 points out of a maximum 720 to obtain the thirty-ninth seed heading to the knockout stage, along with his team's score of 1,995 collected from the classification round. Entering the men's team recurve as the seventh-seeded squad, Yu and fellow rookies Kao Hao-wen and Wei Chun-heng succumbed unexpectedly to a tough 2–6 defeat from the unheralded Indonesians in their elimination round match. Unable to recover from his team's premature exit, Yu was shortly eliminated in a tough 5–6 shoot-off against Norway's three-time Olympian Bård Nesteng during their opening-round encounter of the men's individual recurve.
