= Wei Chun-heng =

Taiwanese archer (born 1994)

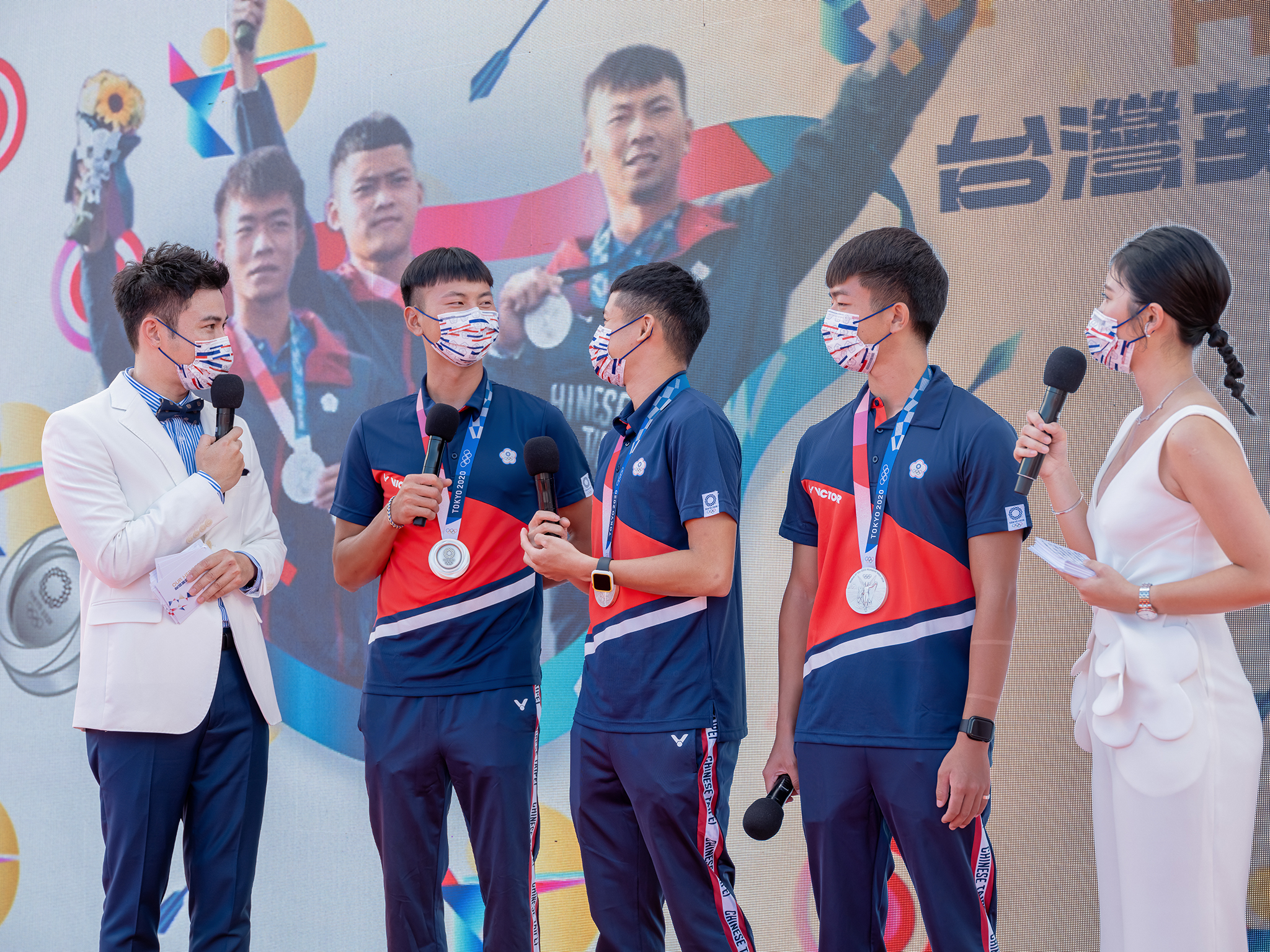

Personal information
- Full name: Wei Chun-heng
- Born: 6 July 1994 (age 32) Taipei, Taiwan
- Height: 1.80 m (5 ft 11 in)
- Weight: 74 kg (163 lb)

Sport
- Country: Chinese Taipei
- Sport: Archery
- Event: Recurve
Medal record
Men's recurve archery
Representing Chinese Taipei
Olympic Games
Silver medal – second place	2020 Tokyo	Team
World Championships
Silver medal – second place	2017 Mexico	Individual
Bronze medal – third place	2021 Yankton	Team
Asian Games
Gold medal – first place	2018 Jakarta	Team
Asian Championships
Gold medal – first place	2015 Bangkok	Mixed team
Bronze medal – third place	2015 Bangkok	Team
Summer Universiade
Gold medal – first place	2019 Naples	Mixed team
Silver medal – second place	2019 Naples	Team
Silver medal – second place	2017 Taipei	Team
Silver medal – second place	2015 Gwangju	Mixed Team
Silver medal – second place	2015 Gwangju	Team
- Updated on 29 July 2023

Wei Chun-heng (Chinese: 魏均珩; pinyin: Wèi Jūnháng, born June 6, 1994) is a Taiwanese competitive archer. He won a bronze medal in the men's team recurve at the 2015 Asian Championships, and also competed as a member of Chinese Taipei's archery squad at the 2016 Summer Olympics.

Wei was selected to compete for the Taiwanese squad at the 2016 Summer Olympics in Rio de Janeiro, shooting both in individual and team recurve tournaments. First, Wei amassed a total of 679 points out of a maximum 720 to lead the Taiwanese trio for the ninth seed heading to the knockout stage, along with his team's score of 1,995 collected from the classification round. Entering the men's team recurve as the seventh-seeded squad, Wei and his compatriots Kao Hao-wen and Yu Guan-lin succumbed unexpectedly to a tough 2–6 defeat from the unheralded Indonesians in their elimination round match. Rebounding from his team's premature exit, Wei quickly dispatched Fiji's experienced Olympian Rob Elder in straight sets to book the round of 32 spot in the men's individual recurve, before he dropped the match in a grueling 5–6 shoot-off to Thailand's Witthaya Thamwong.
