= Gavin Sutherland (archer) =

Zimbabwean archer (born 1979)

Personal information
- Full name: Gavin Ben Sutherland
- Born: 26 June 1979 (age 47) Bulawayo, Zimbabwe
- Height: 1.86 m (6 ft 1 in)
- Weight: 78 kg (172 lb)

Sport
- Country: Zimbabwe
- Sport: Archery
- Event: Recurve
- Club: Worthing Archery Club (GBR)
- Coached by: Gary Kinghorn
- Updated on 24 February 2017

Gavin Ben Sutherland (born 26 June 1979) is a Zimbabwean competitive archer. He became the first archer to represent Zimbabwe in an Olympic tournament since the late Wrex Tarr's appearance in Seoul twenty-eight years earlier, finishing as the fifth recurve male at the 2016 African Championships in Windhoek, Namibia to secure the country's Olympic berth for Rio 2016. Currently residing in the United Kingdom, Sutherland trains at an upscale archery range in downtown Worthing, under the tutelage of his coach Gary Kinghorn.

Sutherland was selected by the Zimbabwe Olympic Committee to compete in the men's individual recurve at the 2016 Summer Olympics in Rio de Janeiro. Heading to the knockout stage as the lowest-ranked archer of the 64-man field with 566 points, Sutherland lost his opening round match to the current world holder Kim Woo-jin of South Korea, who comfortably dispatched him from the tournament with an easy 6–0 score.
