= Björn Jansson =

Swedish footballer

Senior career*
| Years | Team | Apps | (Gls) |
- Djurgården
- * Club domestic league appearances and goals

Björn Jansson is a Swedish former footballer. Jansson made 13 Allsvenskan appearances for Djurgården and scored 0 goals.
