= Muhammad Hanif Wijaya =

Indonesian archer

Muhammad Wijaya
Personal information
- Full name: Muhammad Hanif Wijaya
- Born: 22 August 1996 (age 29) Jambi, Indonesia
- Height: 1.71 m (5 ft 7 in)
- Weight: 70 kg (154 lb)

Sport
- Country: Indonesia
- Sport: Archery
- Event: Recurve
- Updated on 22 February 2017

Muhammad Hanif Wijaya (born 22 November 1996) is an Indonesian competitive archer. He competed as a member of the Indonesian archery squad in major international tournaments, spanning the World Championships, Asian Championships, and the 2016 Summer Olympics.

Wijaya was selected to compete for Indonesia at the 2016 Summer Olympics in Rio de Janeiro, shooting in both individual and team recurve tournaments. First, Wijaya amassed a total of 647 points out of a maximum 720 to obtain a forty-ninth seed heading to the knockout stage, along with his team's score of 1,962 collected from the classification round. Sitting at tenth in the men's team recurve, Wijaya and his compatriots Riau Ega Agatha and Hendra Purnama put up a more tremendous effort by trouncing Chinese Taipei in the opening round, before they faced their quarterfinal match against the Americans, which led to the trio's early departure from the competition at 2–6. In the men's individual recurve, Wijaya succumbed to the two-time medalist Mauro Nespoli of Italy in the opening round match with a score of 1–7.
