= Klemen Štrajhar =

Slovenian archer (born 1994)

Klemen Štrajhar (born 20 August 1994) is a Slovenian archer. He competed in the men’s individual event at the 2012 Summer Olympics.
