= Jonas Andersson (archer) =

Swedish archer (born 1979)

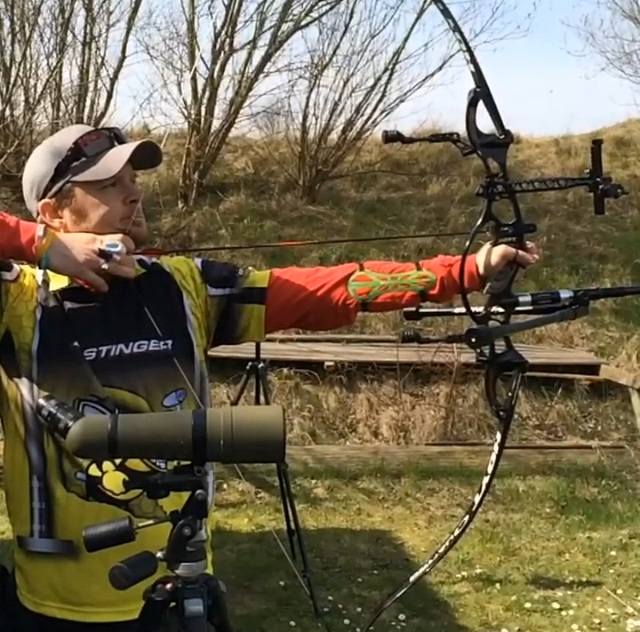

Personal information
- Full name: Jonas Lennart Andersson
- Born: 16 May 1979 (age 47) Sweden

Sport
- Sport: archery (recurve)
- Updated on 19 August 2015

Jonas Lennart Andersson (born 16 May 1979, in Fosie) is a Swedish archer. He lives in Trelleborg and competes for Trelleborgs BK. Jonas started shooting archery in 1993 as a compound archer and switched to Olympic archery in 1997.

Andersson competed at the 2004 Summer Olympics in men's individual archery. He won his first match against David Barnes of Australia 160-151, advancing to the round of 32. In the second round of elimination, he was defeated by Balzhinima Tsyrempilov of Russia. His final rank was 25th overall.

Andersson was also a member of the 9th-place Swedish men's archery team at the 2004 Summer Olympics, along with Mattias Eriksson and Magnus Petersson. With this team he previously won World Championship silver (in 2003) and gold (in 2002) medal in field archery. Jonas got the 7 place at the World Games in Akita(Japan) in 2001. Jonas has several nation titles in both target and field archery. He competed at the 2015 World Archery Championships in Copenhagen, Denmark.

Jonas is married to his wife Lisa and they have two daughters Tuva and Maya.
