= Ernesto Boardman =

Mexican archer (born 1993)

Personal information
- Full name: Ernesto Horacio Boardman López
- Born: 23 February 1993 (age 33) Saltillo, Coahuila, Mexico
- Height: 1.75 m (5 ft 9 in)
- Weight: 92 kg (203 lb)

Sport
- Country: Mexico
- Sport: Archery
- Event: Recurve
Medal record
Men's archery
Representing Mexico
Pan American Games
Gold medal – first place	2015 Toronto	Team
World Cup
Silver medal – second place	2016 Medellín	Team
Silver medal – second place	2016 Antalya	Team
- Updated on 22 February 2017

Ernesto Horacio Boardman López (Note: In this Spanish name, the first or paternal surname is Boardman and the second or maternal family name is López.) (born 23 February 1993) is a Mexican competitive archer. He captured the men's team recurve title, alongside his compatriots Juan René Serrano and Luis Álvarez, in a historic final match against the United States at the 2015 Pan American Games in Toronto, Canada, and eventually competed as a lone male archer at the 2016 Summer Olympics, ending his run in an immediate departure from the initial round.

Boardman was selected to compete as a lone male archer for the Mexican team at the 2016 Summer Olympics, shooting only in the individual recurve tournament. First, he fired off a score of 662 points, including 25 targets of a perfect ten, for the twenty-eight spot against a field of 63 other archers in the qualifying round. Heading to the knockout stage, Boardman bowed out early in the opening round match to his Cuban opponent Adrián Puentes with a score of 4–6.
