= Robin Ramaekers =

Belgian archer (born 1994)

Personal information
- Full name: Robin Ramaekers
- Born: 5 January 1996 (age 30) Tongeren, Belgium
- Height: 1.80 m (5 ft 11 in)
- Weight: 78 kg (172 lb)

Sport
- Country: Belgium
- Sport: Archery
- Event: Recurve
- Club: Schutters Handboog Tongeren
- Coached by: Francis Notenboom
- Updated on 22 February 2017

Robin Ramaekers (born 26 October 1994) is a Belgian competitive archer. He competed as a member of the Belgian archery squad in major international tournaments, spanning the World Championships, the 2015 European Games, and the 2016 Summer Olympics. Ramaekers currently trains at a local archery range in his native Tongeren (Dutch: Schutters Handboog Tongeren, SHT), under the tutelage of his coach Francis Notenboom, a former Olympian from the 1988 edition.

At the 2016 Summer Olympics in Rio de Janeiro, Ramaekers became the first Belgian archer to compete in an Olympic tournament since 2000, shooting only in the men's individual recurve. First, he recorded a total score of 654 points, including 25 targets of a perfect ten, to seal the forty-second seed from a field of 64 archers in the classification round. Heading to the knockout stage on the third day of the Games, Ramaekers firmly disposed the hard-charging Australian Ryan Tyack at 6–2 in the opening round, before he dropped his subsequent match on three straight sets to the Spaniard and tenth-seeded archer Juan Ignacio Rodríguez.
