= Lucas Daniel =

French archer (born 1995)

Personal information
- Full name: Lucas Daniel
- Born: 1 January 1995 (age 31) Riom, France
- Height: 1.80 m (5 ft 11 in)
- Weight: 80 kg (176 lb)

Sport
- Country: France
- Sport: Archery
- Event: Recurve
- Updated on 22 February 2017

Lucas Daniel (born 1 January 1995) is a French competitive archer. He attained a fourth-place finish in the men's team recurve at the 2015 European Games, and eventually competed as a member of the French archery squad at the 2016 Summer Olympics.

Daniel was selected to compete for the French squad at the 2016 Summer Olympics in Rio de Janeiro, shooting in both individual and team recurve tournaments. First, Daniel amassed 666 points out of a maximum 720 to obtain a twenty-first seed heading to the knockout stage, along with his team's score of 2,003 collected from the classification round. Sitting at fifth in the men's team recurve, Daniel and his compatriots Pierre Plihon and Jean-Charles Valladont confidently beat the Malaysians in the opening round with a 2–6, before they faced a quarterfinal match against Australia, which led to the trio's untimely demise from the competition through a tough 3–5 defeat. In the men's individual recurve, Daniel succumbed to the reigning European Games champion Miguel Alvariño of Spain, who scored straight-set victories in the opening round.
