= Antonio Fernández (archer) =

Spanish archer (born 1991)

Personal information
- Full name: Antonio Fernández Fernández
- Born: 12 June 1991 (age 35) Cáceres, Spain
- Height: 184 cm (6 ft 0 in)
- Weight: 76 kg (168 lb)

Sport
- Country: Spain
- Sport: Archery
- Event: Recurve
- Club: San Jorge de Cáceres
- Coached by: Cho Hyung-mok
Medal record
Men's archery
Representing Spain
European Games
Silver medal – second place	2015 Baku	Team
- Updated on 18 February 2017

Antonio Fernández Fernández (born 12 June 1991) is a Spanish competitive archer. He won a silver medal as a member of the nation's archery squad at the 2015 European Games, and also collected two individual titles in a regional competition, spanning the European Grand Prix and the Mediterranean Games, both of which were held in 2013. Since his sporting debut as a teenager, Fernandez currently trains under the tutelage of his Korean-born coach Cho Hyung-mok for the Spanish team, while shooting at San Jorge de Cáceres.

Fernández rose to prominence in the international archery scene, when he and his compatriots Juan Ignacio Rodríguez and eventual individual champion Miguel Alvariño obtained a silver medal in the men's team recurve final against Ukraine at the 2015 European Games in Baku, Azerbaijan. He promptly followed the team archery results by helping the Spaniards secure a full quota spot for Rio 2016 at the World Championships few months later in Copenhagen, Denmark.

At the 2016 Summer Olympics, Fernández was selected to compete for Spain in both individual and team recurve tournaments. First, he amassed a total of 1,986 points to hand the Spanish trio an eighth overall spot in the ranking round, along with his individual score of 657 as the thirty-fifth seed heading to the knockout stage. In the men's team recurve, Fernández and his compatriots Rodríguez and Alvariño bowed out to the Dutchmen in the opening round of the tournament, conceding a slick 1–5 defeat. Few days later, in the men's individual recurve, Fernández avenged his team's early exit by dispatching Chinese Taipei's Kao Hao-wen (6–0) and Italy's no. 3 seed David Pasqualucci (6–2) through the opening rounds, before he was beaten with a 3–7 score by Australia's eventual quarterfinalist Taylor Worth in his succeeding match.
