= Sjef van den Berg =

Dutch archer (born 1995)

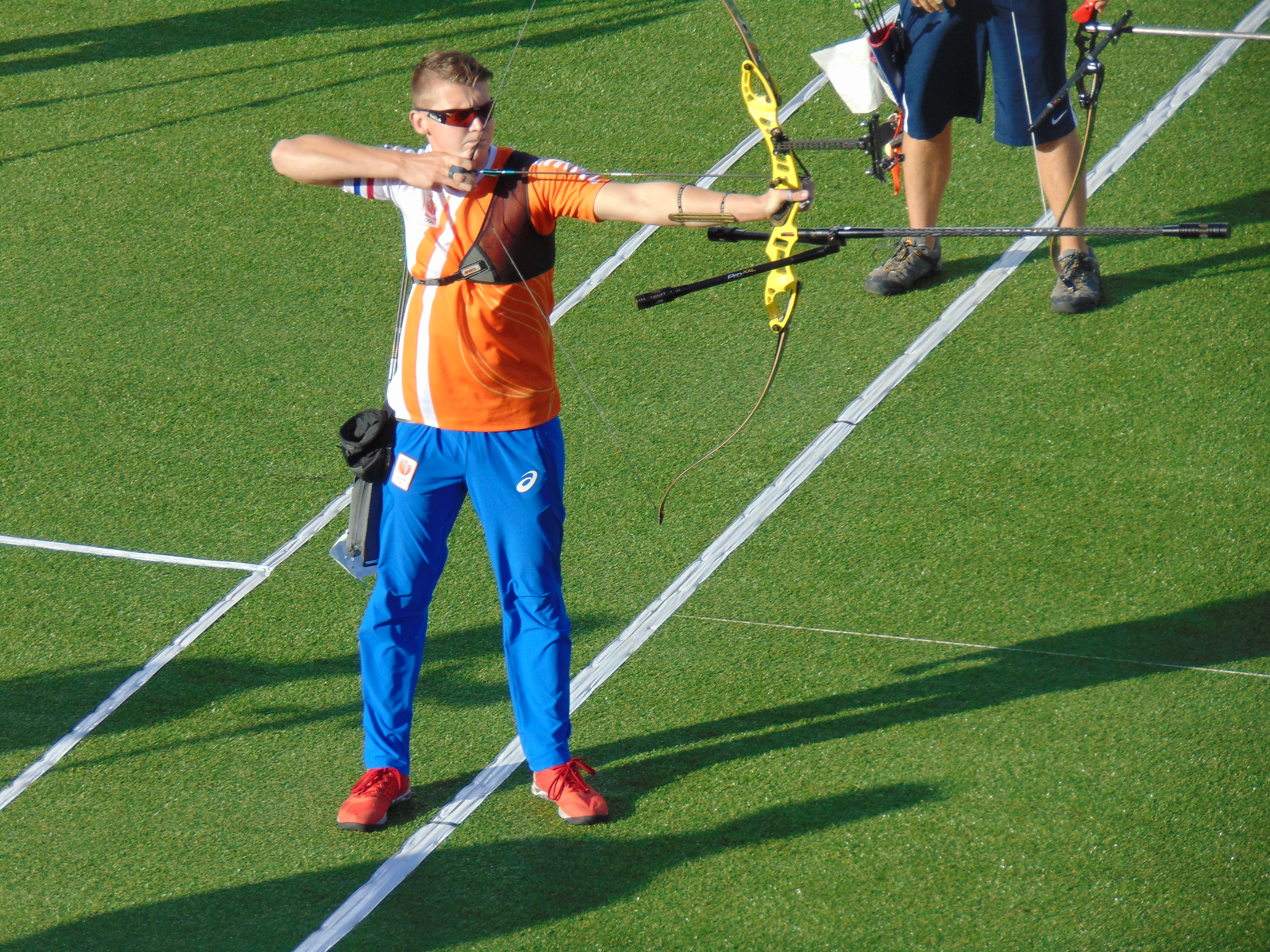
- Van den Berg at the 2016 Summer Olympics

Personal information
- Full name: Sjef van den Berg
- Born: 14 April 1995 (age 31) Heeswijk-Dinther, Netherlands
- Height: 1.83 m (6 ft 0 in)
- Weight: 75 kg (165 lb)

Sport
- Country: Netherlands
- Sport: Archery
- Event: Recurve
- Club: HBV Ontspanning
- Coached by: Ron van der Hoff (2010–)

Achievements and titles
- Highest world ranking: 2 (2 May 2016)
Medal record
Men's archery
Representing the Netherlands
World Championships
Silver medal – second place	2019 's-Hertogenbosch	Mixed Team
World Cup
Gold medal – first place	2021 Lausanne	Mixed Team
Silver medal – second place	2021 Paris	Mixed Team
European Games
Silver medal – second place	2015 Baku	Individual
Silver medal – second place	2019 Minsk	Team
Bronze medal – third place	2015 Baku	Team
- Updated on 2019

Sjef van den Berg (born 14 April 1995) is a retired Dutch competitive archer. He has won a total of two medals (a silver in the individual recurve and a bronze for the Dutch team) at the 2015 European Games, and eventually finished fourth in the men's individual archery at the 2016 Summer Olympics. Van der Berg currently trains at HBV Ontspanning in Sint-Oedenrode, under the tutelage of his coach Ron van der Hoff, a former Olympian at the Athens 2004 edition.

Born and raised in southern town of Heeswijk-Dinther, van den Berg took up archery as a four-year-old, and then made his international debut in 2010.

Van den Berg rose to prominence in the international archery scene, when he progressed to the individual final at the 2015 European Games in Baku, losing the gold to the Spaniard Miguel Alvariño with a set score 1–7. Furthermore, Van den Berg delivered the Dutch threesome of Mitch Dielemans and London 2012 Olympian Rick van der Ven a bronze medal in the team recurve.

In July 2015, Van den Berg headed up the Dutch team at the World Championships in Copenhagen, Denmark, where they obtained a full quota place for Rio 2016, booking their country's maiden appearance in an Olympic archery competition since Athens 2004. He continued his inexorable rise with a creditable runner-up effort at the Olympic test event two months later in Rio de Janeiro, Brazil, quickly vaulting him to the top ten of the world rankings in men's archery.

Van den Berg was selected to compete for the Dutch squad at the 2016 Summer Olympics, shooting in both individual and team recurve tournaments. First, he led the Dutch trio by compiling a total of 1,981 points to finish ninth in the ranking round, along with his individual score of 684 for the fourth seed heading to the knockout stage. In the men's team recurve, van den Berg, along with his teammates Dielemans and van der Ven, managed to trounce the Spaniards in the opening round, before conceding a 2–6 defeat to the eventual champion South Korea in the quarterfinals . While his compatriots fell out early in the elimination rounds of the individual recurve, Van den Berg survived through every match until the semifinals, where he lost to the Frenchman Jean-Charles Valladont in a 3–7 playoff. Despite his semifinal exit, Van den Berg seized a chance to become the Netherlands' first Olympic medalist in archery after 16 years, but abruptly ended his run in a 2–6 defeat from the U.S. archer Brady Ellison.

In 2021, he won the gold medal in the men's team recurve event at the European Archery Championships held in Antalya, Turkey.
