= Boris Baláž =

Slovak archer (born 1997)

Personal information
- Full name: Boris Baláž
- Nickname: Borko
- Born: 20 November 1997 (age 28) Liptovský Mikuláš, Slovakia
- Height: 1.82 m (6 ft 0 in)
- Weight: 72 kg (159 lb)

Sport
- Country: Slovakia
- Sport: Archery
- Event: Recurve
- Club: Liptovský školský lukostrelecký
- Coached by: Miroslav Bendík
- Updated on 24 February 2017

Boris Baláž (born November 20, 1997) is a Slovak competitive archer. Baláž made his debut on the Slovak national team at the age of nine, and eventually competed in numerous international archery tournaments, spanning the 2014 Summer Youth Olympics, the 2015 European Games, and the 2016 Summer Olympics. Baláž currently trains under the tutelage of head coach Miroslav Bendík for the Slovak squad, while shooting at a local archery range in his native Liptovský Mikuláš (Slovak: Liptovský školský lukostrelecký).

At the 2016 Summer Olympics in Rio de Janeiro, Baláž etched a historic mark for Slovakia as one of the country's first archers sent to the Olympic tournament, shooting only in the men's individual recurve. Baláž managed to fire off a score of 631 points, including 18 targets of a perfect ten, for the fifty-ninth spot against a field of 63 other archers in the qualifying round, before he faced his initial challenge against the eventual champion Ku Bon-chan of South Korea, abruptly ending his Olympic debut in a harsh 0–6 defeat.
