= Yağız Yılmaz =

Turkish archer (born 1993)

Personal information
- Born: 14 October 1993 (age 32)

Sport
- Country: Turkey
- Sport: Archery
- Event: recurve
- Updated on 2 September 2015

Yağız Yılmaz (born 14 October 1993) is a male Turkish recurve archer. He competed in the individual recurve event and the team recurve event at the 2015 World Archery Championships in Copenhagen, Denmark.
