= David Pasqualucci =

Italian archer (born 1996)

Personal information
- Full name: David Pasqualucci
- Born: 27 June 1996 (age 29) Frascati, Italy
- Height: 1.82 m (6 ft 0 in)
- Weight: 74 kg (163 lb)

Sport
- Country: Italy
- Sport: Archery
- Event: Recurve
- Club: Arcieri del Tempio di Diana
- Coached by: Wietse van Alten (national)
Medal record
Men's archery
Representing Italy
World Championships
Gold medal – first place	2017 Mexico	Team
Silver medal – second place	2015 Copenhagen	Team
European Games
Bronze medal – third place	2019 Minsk	Team
- Updated on 24 October 2017

David Pasqualucci (born 27 June 1996) is an Italian competitive archer. He won a silver medal in the men's team recurve at the 2015 World Championships, and also competed as a member of Italy's archery squad at the 2016 Summer Olympics. He currently trains under the tutelage of his coaches Fabio Pivari and Wietse van Alten, a Sydney 2000 Olympian from the Netherlands, for the Italian team, while shooting at the Tempio di Diana Archery Range (Italian: Arcieri del Tempio di Diana) in Rome.

Pasqualucci rose to prominence in the international archery scene at the 2015 World Championships in Copenhagen, Denmark. There, he and his compatriots Michele Frangilli and Mauro Nespoli, both of whom came as reigning Olympic champions from London 2012, capture a silver medal in the men's team recurve to secure a full quota spot for Rio 2016, despite losing the title 0–6 to the South Koreans.

At the 2016 Summer Olympics in Rio de Janeiro, Pasqualucci was selected to compete for the Italian archery squad, shooting in both individual and team tournaments. First, Pasqualucci managed to score 685 points out of a maximum 720 to lead the Italian trio for the third seed heading to the knockout stage, along with his team's score of 2,007 collected from the classification round. Looking forward to defend the men's team recurve title for Italy, Pasqualacci and his compatriots Nespoli and Marco Galiazzo received a bye for the quarterfinals as a third-seeded team, but suffered an untimely defeat to China in a 0–6 upset. Rebounding from his Italian team's quarterfinal exit, Pasqualacci quickly dispatched Malawi's Areneo David in straight sets to book the round two spot in the men's individual recurve, before he bowed out to the Spaniard Antonio Fernández at 2–6.
