= Juan Ignacio Rodríguez =

Spanish archer (born 1992)

Personal information
- Full name: Juan Ignacio Rodríguez Liebana
- Born: 19 April 1992 (age 34) Las Rozas de Madrid, Spain
- Height: 1.85 m (6 ft 1 in)
- Weight: 83 kg (183 lb)

Sport
- Country: Spain
- Sport: Archery
- Event: Recurve
- Club: Rozas Archery
- Coached by: Cho Hyung-mok
Medal record
Men's archery
Representing Spain
European Games
Silver medal – second place	2015 Baku	Team
- Updated on 18 February 2017

Juan Ignacio Rodríguez Liebana (born 19 June 1992) is a Spanish competitive archer. He won a silver medal as a member of the nation's archery squad at the 2013 Mediterranean Games and at the 2015 European Games. Since his sporting debut as a 19-year-old, Fernandez currently trains under the tutelage of his Korean-born coach Cho Hyung-mok for the Spanish team, while shooting at a local archery range in his native Las Rozas de Madrid.

Rodríguez rose to prominence in the international archery scene, when he and his compatriots Antonio Fernández and eventual individual champion Miguel Alvariño obtained a silver medal in the men's team recurve final against Ukraine at the 2015 European Games in Baku, Azerbaijan. He promptly followed the team archery results by helping the Spaniards secure a full quota spot for Rio 2016 at the World Championships few months later in Copenhagen, Denmark, booking his country's maiden appearance in an Olympic archery competition since 1992.

At the 2016 Summer Olympics, Rodríguez was selected to compete for Spain in both individual and team recurve tournaments. First, he led the Spanish trio by compiling a total of 1,986 points to finish eighth in the ranking round, along with his individual score of 678 as the tenth seed heading to the knockout stage. In the men's team recurve, Rodríguez and his compatriots Fernández and Alvariño bowed out to the Dutchmen in the opening round of the tournament, conceding a slick 1–5 defeat. Few days later, in the men's individual recurve, Rodríguez avenged his team's early exit by easily dispatching Malaysia's Muhammad Akmal Nor Hasrin and Belgium's Robin Ramaekers through the opening rounds, before he was disposed with a 3–7 score by Japanese archer and London 2012 silver medalist Takaharu Furukawa in his succeeding match.
