= Kao Hao-wen =

Taiwanese archer (born 1995)

Personal information
- Born: 17 March 1995 (age 31) Hualien City

Sport
- Country: Chinese Taipei
- Sport: Archery
- Event: Recurve
- Updated on 26 July 2016

Kao Hao-wen (Chinese: 高浩文; born 17 March 1995 in Hualien City) is a male Chinese Taipei recurve archer. He competed in the archery competition at the 2016 Summer Olympics in Rio de Janeiro.

Kao is a member of the Taroko tribe and hails from Xiulin township. As a child, he watched his elders hunt with bows and arrows, so he became interested in archery.
