= Sławomir Napłoszek =

Polish archer (born 1968)

Personal information
- Nationality: Polish
- Born: 29 July 1968 (age 56); Warsaw, Poland

Sport
- Sport: Archery

Sławomir Napłoszek (born 29 July 1968) is a Polish archer. He competed in the men's individual and team events at the 1992 Summer Olympics.
