= Bård Nesteng =

Norwegian archer (born 1979)

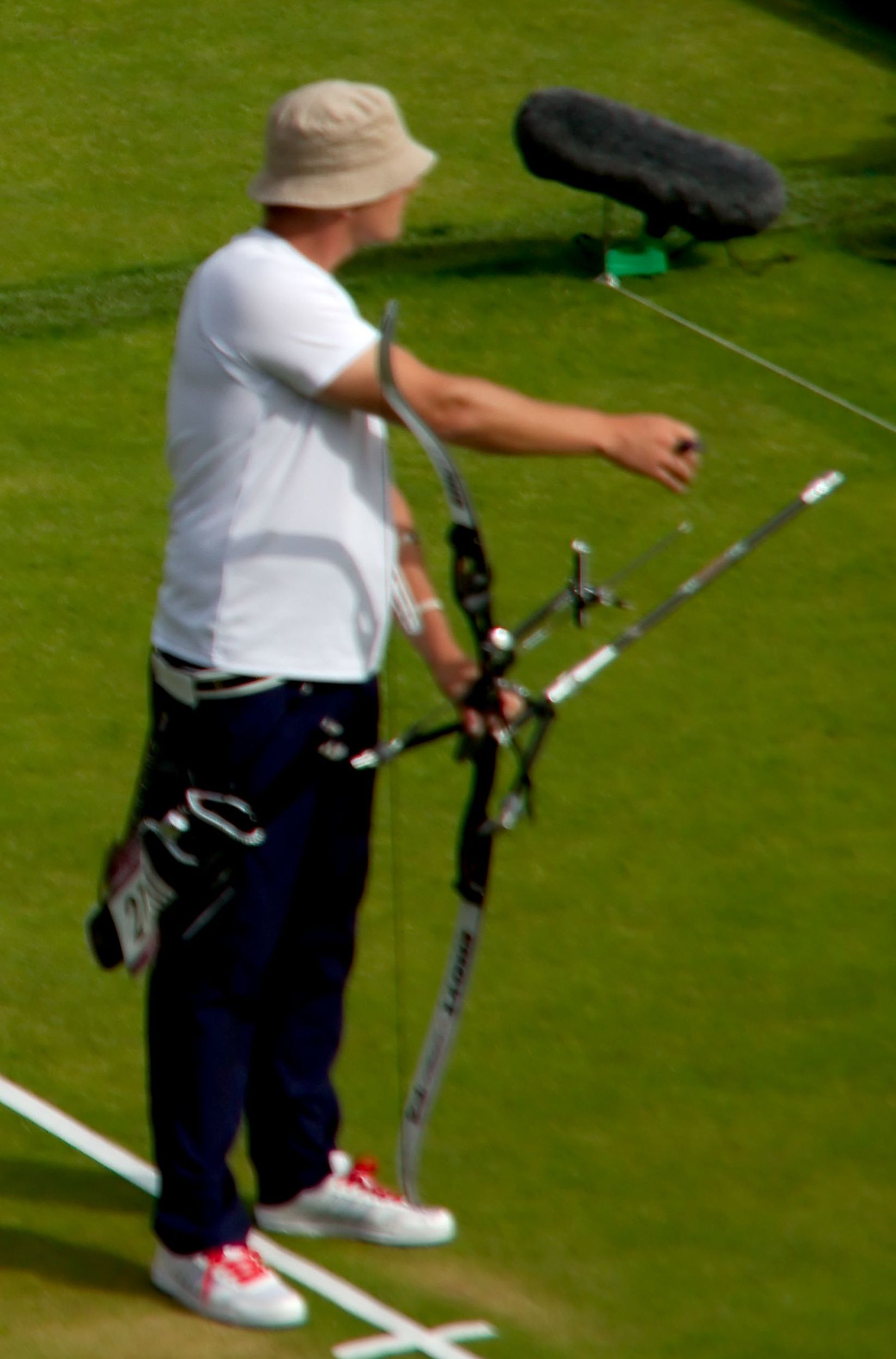

Personal information
- Full name: Bård Magnus Nesteng
- Born: 14 May 1979 (age 47) Fredrikstad, Norway

Sport
- Country: Norway
- Sport: Archery
- Club: Fredrikstad Bueskyttere

Bård Magnus Nesteng (born 14 May 1979, in Fredrikstad, Norway) is a Norwegian archer. He competed at the 2000 Summer Olympics in Sydney, the 2012 Summer Olympics in London, and the 2016 Summer Olympics in Rio de Janeiro.

== Personal life ==
Nesteng was born in Fredrikstad on 14 May 1979.
