= Miguel Alvariño =

Spanish archer (born 1994)

Personal information
- Full name: Miguel Alvariño Garcia
- Born: 31 May 1994 (age 32) Galicia, Spain
Medal record
Men's recurve archery
Representing Spain
European Games
Gold medal – first place	2015 Baku	Individual
Gold medal – first place	2023 Kraków-Małopolska	Mixed team
Silver medal – second place	2015 Baku	Team
Silver medal – second place	2023 Kraków-Małopolska	Individual
Silver medal – second place	2023 Kraków-Małopolska	Team
Mediterranean Games
Silver medal – second place	2022 Oran	Team
Bronze medal – third place	2018 Tarragona	Team
Bronze medal – third place	2022 Oran	Mixed team

Miguel Alvariño Garcia (born 31 May 1994 in As Pontes de García Rodríguez, Galicia) is an athlete from Spain, who competes in recurve archery. He found prominence as the winner of the men's individual archery competition at the inaugural European Games. At the same event, he was part of the Spanish team that won a silver medal in the team competition.

He won the gold medal in the men's individual recurve event at the 2022 European Archery Championships held in Munich, Germany. He also won the silver medal in the men's team recurve event.
