= Archery at the Summer World University Games =

- Events: 10 (men: 4; women: 4; mixed: 2)

Games
- 1959; 1960; 1961; 1962; 1963; 1964; 1965; 1966; 1967; 1968; 1970; 1970; 1973; 1972; 1975; 1975; 1977; 1978; 1979; 1981; 1983; 1985; 1987; 1989; 1991; 1993; 1995; 1997; 1999; 2001; 2003; 2005; 2007; 2009; 2011; 2013; 2015; 2017; 2019; 2021; 2025

Archery is a sport at the Universiade that was contested as an optional sport between 2003 and 2015, and after 2017 became a compulsory sport.

== Summary ==
Games	Year	Events	Best nation
1			
2			
3			
4			
5			
6			
7			
8			
9			
10			
11			
12			
13			
14			
15			
16			
17			
18			
19			
20			
21			
22	2003	8	South Korea
23	2005	8	South Korea
24			
25	2009	10	South Korea
26	2011	10	South Korea
27			
28	2015	10	South Korea
29	2017	10	South Korea
30	2019	10	South Korea
31	2021	10	South Korea
32	2025	10	South Korea

== Events ==
=== Recurve ===
Event	03	05	09	11	15	17	19	21	25	Years
Men's individual	•	•	•	•	•	•	•	•	•	9
Men's team	•	•	•	•	•	•	•	•	•	9
Women's individual	•	•	•	•	•	•	•	•	•	9
Women's team	•	•	•	•	•	•	•	•	•	9
Mixed team			•	•	•	•	•	•	•	7

=== Compound ===
Event	03	05	09	11	15	17	19	21	25	Years
Men's individual	•	•	•	•	•	•	•	•	•	9
Men's team	•	•	•	•	•	•	•	•	•	9
Women's individual	•	•	•	•	•	•	•	•	•	9
Women's team	•	•	•	•	•	•	•	•	•	9
Mixed team			•	•	•	•	•	•	•	7

== Editions ==
Games	Year	Host city	Host country	Winner	Second	Third
22	2003	Daegu	South Korea	South Korea	United States	Italy
23	2005	İzmir	Turkey	South Korea	Ukraine	France
25	2009	Belgrade	Serbia	South Korea	United States	Russia
26	2011	Shenzhen	China	South Korea	Russia	France
28	2015	Gwangju	South Korea	South Korea	Chinese Taipei	Russia
29	2017	Taipei	Taiwan	South Korea	Russia	Chinese Taipei
30	2019	Naples	Italy	South Korea	Russia	Chinese Taipei
31	2021	Chengdu	China	South Korea	India	China
33	2025	Essen	Germany	South Korea	India	Japan

== Medalists ==
=== Recurve ===
==== Men's individual ====
Games	Gold	Silver	Bronze
(South Korea) 2003 Daegu	Bang Jea-hwan (KOR)	Lee Chang-hwan (KOR)	Oleksandr Serdyuk (UKR)
(Turkey) 2005 İzmir	Kuo Cheng-wei (TPE)	Hong Sung-chil (KOR)	Choi Young-kwang (KOR)
(Serbia) 2009 Belgrade	Viktor Ruban (UKR)	Wang Cheng-pang (TPE)	Dmytro Hrachov (UKR)
(China) 2011 Shenzhen	Im Dong-hyun (KOR)	Kim Woo-jin (KOR)	Kim Bub-min (KOR)
(South Korea) 2015 Gwangju	Lee Seung-yun (KOR)	Ku Bon-chan (KOR)	Kim Woo-jin (KOR)
(Taiwan) 2017 Taipei	Lee Seung-yun (KOR)	Arsalan Baldanov (RUS)	Kim Woo-jin (KOR)
(Italy) 2019 Naples	Lee Woo-seok (KOR)	Erdem Tsydypov (RUS)	Yuta Ishii (JPN)
(China) 2021 Chengdu	Seo Min-gi (KOR)	Yuki Kawata (JPN)	Reza Shabani (IRI)
(Germany) 2025 Essen	Tang Chih-chun (TPE)	Qin Wangyu (CHN)	Berkim Tümer (TUR)

==== Men's team ====
Games	Gold	Silver	Bronze
(South Korea) 2003 Daegu	France (FRA)	South Korea (KOR)	China (CHN)
(Turkey) 2005 İzmir	Ukraine (UKR)	South Korea (KOR)	Russia (RUS)
(Serbia) 2009 Belgrade	South Korea (KOR)	Chinese Taipei (TPE)	Italy (ITA)
(China) 2011 Shenzhen	China (CHN)	Japan (JPN)	France (FRA)
(South Korea) 2015 Gwangju	South Korea (KOR)	Chinese Taipei (TPE)	Russia (RUS)
(Taiwan) 2017 Taipei	South Korea (KOR)	Chinese Taipei (TPE)	Russia (RUS)
(Italy) 2019 Naples	Russia (RUS)	Chinese Taipei (TPE)	United States (USA)
(China) 2021 Chengdu	South Korea (KOR)	Chinese Taipei (TPE)	Italy (ITA)
(Germany) 2025 Essen	Japan (JPN)	South Korea (KOR)	Turkey (TUR)

==== Women's individual ====
Games	Gold	Silver	Bronze
(South Korea) 2003 Daegu	Park Sung-hyun (KOR)	Yun Mi-jin (KOR)	Lee Hyun-jung (KOR)
(Turkey) 2005 İzmir	Lee Sung-jin (KOR)	Kateryna Palekha (UKR)	Viktoriya Koval (UKR)
(Serbia) 2009 Belgrade	Kim Ye-seul (KOR)	Kim Yu-mi (KOR)	Gema Buitron Cortinas (ESP)
(China) 2011 Shenzhen	Ki Bo-bae (KOR)	Jung Dasomi (KOR)	Cho Pei-ching (TPE)
(South Korea) 2015 Gwangju	Ki Bo-bae (KOR)	Choi Mi-sun (KOR)	Maja Jager (DEN)
(Taiwan) 2017 Taipei	Kang Chae-young (KOR)	Tan Ya-ting (TPE)	Alejandra Valencia (MEX)
(Italy) 2019 Naples	Kang Chae-young (KOR)	Choi Mi-sun (KOR)	Peng Chia-mao (TPE)
(China) 2021 Chengdu	Choi Mi-sun (KOR)	Diana Tursunbek (KAZ)	Peng Chia-mao (TPE)
(Germany) 2025 Essen	Nam Su-hyeon (KOR)	Liu Yianxu (CHN)	Ruka Uehara (JPN)

==== Women's team ====
Games	Gold	Silver	Bronze
(South Korea) 2003 Daegu	South Korea (KOR)	China (CHN)	Ukraine (UKR)
(Turkey) 2005 İzmir	South Korea (KOR)	Ukraine (UKR)	Poland (POL)
(Serbia) 2009 Belgrade	South Korea (KOR)	Ukraine (UKR)	China (CHN)
(China) 2011 Shenzhen	South Korea (KOR)	Ukraine (UKR)	Chinese Taipei (TPE)
(South Korea) 2015 Gwangju	Chinese Taipei (TPE)	South Korea (KOR)	Russia (RUS)
(Taiwan) 2017 Taipei	South Korea (KOR)	Chinese Taipei (TPE)	Russia (RUS)
(Italy) 2019 Naples	South Korea (KOR)	Russia (RUS)	Ukraine (UKR)
(China) 2021 Chengdu	China (CHN)	South Korea (KOR)	India (IND)
(Germany) 2025 Essen	Japan (JPN)	Chinese Taipei (TPE)	China (CHN)

==== Mixed team ====
Games	Gold	Silver	Bronze
(Serbia) 2009 Belgrade	South Korea (KOR)	Ukraine (UKR)	Poland (POL)
(China) 2011 Shenzhen	South Korea (KOR)	Chinese Taipei (TPE)	Ukraine (UKR)
(South Korea) 2015 Gwangju	South Korea (KOR)	Chinese Taipei (TPE)	Russia (RUS)
(Taiwan) 2017 Taipei	South Korea (KOR)	France (FRA)	Mexico (MEX)
(Italy) 2019 Naples	Chinese Taipei (TPE)	Japan (JPN)	Ukraine (UKR)
(China) 2021 Chengdu	Japan (JPN)	South Korea (KOR)	Italy (ITA)
(Germany) 2025 Essen	China (CHN)	Japan (JPN)	South Korea (KOR)

=== Compound ===
==== Men's individual ====
Games	Gold	Silver	Bronze
(South Korea) 2003 Daegu	Daniele Bauro (ITA)	Jo Young-Joon (KOR)	Drew Lasher (USA)
(Turkey) 2005 İzmir	Sergio Pagni (ITA)	Florian Faucheur (FRA)	Daniele Bauro (ITA)
(Serbia) 2009 Belgrade	Steven Gatto (USA)	Federico Pettenazzo (ITA)	Danzan Khaludorov (RUS)
(China) 2011 Shenzhen	Alexander Dambaev (RUS)	Choi Yong-hee (KOR)	Sebastien Brasseur (FRA)
(South Korea) 2015 Gwangju	Kim Jong-ho (KOR)	Kim Tae-yoon (KOR)	Renaud Domanski (BEL)
(Taiwan) 2017 Taipei	Kim Jong-ho (KOR)	Demir Elmaağaçlı (TUR)	Mario Vavro (CRO)
(Italy) 2019 Naples	Anton Bulayev (RUS)	Muhammed Yetın (TUR)	Kim Jong-ho (KOR)
(China) 2021 Chengdu	Sangampreet Singh Bisla (IND)	Christian Beyers de Klerk (RSA)	Aman Saini (IND)
(Germany) 2025 Essen	Sahil Rajesh Jadhav (IND)	Ajay Scott (GBR)	Przemysław Konecki (POL)

==== Men's team ====
Games	Gold	Silver	Bronze
(South Korea) 2003 Daegu	South Korea (KOR)	Netherlands (NED)	United States (USA)
(Turkey) 2005 İzmir	South Korea (KOR)	United States (USA)	Mexico (MEX)
(Serbia) 2009 Belgrade	United States (USA)	Mexico (MEX)	Russia (RUS)
(China) 2011 Shenzhen	France (FRA)	Mexico (MEX)	United States (USA)
(South Korea) 2015 Gwangju	South Korea (KOR)	Mexico (MEX)	Italy (ITA)
(Taiwan) 2017 Taipei	Russia (RUS)	Iran (IRI)	South Korea (KOR)
(Italy) 2019 Naples	Turkey (TUR)	Iran (IRI)	Mexico (MEX)
(China) 2021 Chengdu	China (CHN)	France (FRA)	India (IND)
(Germany) 2025 Essen	Turkey (TUR)	India (IND)	South Korea (KOR)

==== Women's individual ====
Games	Gold	Silver	Bronze
(South Korea) 2003 Daegu	Choi Mi-yeon (KOR)	Mary Zorn (USA)	Sofia Goncharova (RUS)
(Turkey) 2005 İzmir	Amandine Bouillot (FRA)	Kim Hyo-sun (KOR)	Arminda Bastos (MEX)
(Serbia) 2009 Belgrade	Seok Ji-hyun (KOR)	Victoria Balzhanova (RUS)	Erika Anschutz (USA)
(China) 2011 Shenzhen	Polina Nikitina (RUS)	Kendal Nicely (USA)	Victoria Balzhanova (RUS)
(South Korea) 2015 Gwangju	Song Yun-soo (KOR)	Toja Cerne (SLO)	Stephanie Salinas (MEX)
(Taiwan) 2017 Taipei	Song Yun-soo (KOR)	Chen Yi-hsuan (TPE)	So Chae-won (KOR)
(Italy) 2019 Naples	Andrea Becerra (MEX)	So Chae-won (KOR)	Yasım Bostan (TUR)
(China) 2021 Chengdu	Kaur Avneet (IND)	Alyssa Sturgill (USA)	Cho Su-a (KOR)
(China) 2025 Essen	Moon Ye-eun (KOR)	Parneet Kaur (IND)	Park Ye-rin (KOR)

==== Women's team ====
Games	Gold	Silver	Bronze
(South Korea) 2003 Daegu	United States (USA)	South Korea (KOR)	Italy (ITA)
(Turkey) 2005 İzmir	South Korea (KOR)	Russia (RUS)	Turkey (TUR)
(Serbia) 2009 Belgrade	Chinese Taipei (TPE)	Russia (RUS)	South Korea (KOR)
(China) 2011 Shenzhen	South Korea (KOR)	Russia (RUS)	India (IND)
(South Korea) 2015 Gwangju	Russia (RUS)	United States (USA)	South Korea (KOR)
(Taiwan) 2017 Taipei	South Korea (KOR)	Russia (RUS)	Turkey (TUR)
(Italy) 2019 Naples	South Korea (KOR)	Turkey (TUR)	Chinese Taipei (TPE)
(China) 2021 Chengdu	South Korea (KOR)	India (IND)	Chinese Taipei (TPE)
(Germany) 2025 Essen	South Korea (KOR)	United States (USA)	India (IND)

==== Mixed team ====
Games	Gold	Silver	Bronze
(Serbia) 2009 Belgrade	Russia (RUS)	United States (USA)	South Korea (KOR)
(China) 2011 Shenzhen	South Korea (KOR)	United States (USA)	Italy (ITA)
(South Korea) 2015 Gwangju	South Korea (KOR)	India (IND)	Belgium (BEL)
(Taiwan) 2017 Taipei	South Korea (KOR)	Turkey (TUR)	Chinese Taipei (TPE)
(Italy) 2019 Naples	Estonia (EST)	Chinese Taipei (TPE)	South Korea (KOR)
(China) 2021 Chengdu	India (IND)	South Korea (KOR)	Chinese Taipei (TPE)
(Germany) 2025 Essen	India (IND)	South Korea (KOR)	Great Britain (GBR)

== Medal table ==
Last updated after the 2025 Summer World University Games.

Rank	Nation	Gold	Silver	Bronze	Total
1	South Korea (KOR)	48	23	16	87
2	Russia (RUS)	7	8	10	25
3	Chinese Taipei (TPE)	5	13	8	26
4	India (IND)	5	4	5	14
5	China (CHN)	4	3	3	10
6	United States (USA)	3	8	5	16
7	Japan (JPN)	3	4	2	9
8	France (FRA)	3	3	2	8
9	Ukraine (UKR)	2	5	7	14
10	Turkey (TUR)	2	4	5	11
11	Italy (ITA)	2	1	7	10
12	Mexico (MEX)	1	3	6	10
13	Estonia (EST)	1	0	0	1
14	Iran (IRI)	0	2	1	3
15	Great Britain (GBR)	0	1	1	2
16	Kazakhstan (KAZ)	0	1	0	1
16	Netherlands (NED)	0	1	0	1
16	Slovenia (SLO)	0	1	0	1
16	South Africa (RSA)	0	1	0	1
20	Poland (POL)	0	0	3	3
21	Belgium (BEL)	0	0	2	2
22	Croatia (CRO)	0	0	1	1
22	Denmark (DEN)	0	0	1	1
22	Spain (ESP)	0	0	1	1
Totals (24 entries)		86	86	86	258
