= World Indoor Archery Championships =

The World Indoor Archery Championships, an international competition in archery, were held in alternate years from 1991 (except for a three-year gap 2009–2012), to 2018, each time in a different host city and organized by the World Archery Federation (WA). There were events in adult and junior categories using the recurve and compound bows.

The championships were discontinued after their 2018 edition and were effectively replaced by the Indoor Archery World Series, also organized by WA. This annual circuit of events was established in 2010 as the Indoor Archery World Cup, receiving its current name in 2019.

== Indoor ==
Number	Year	Location	Events
1	1991	(Finland) Oulu	4
2	1993	(France) Perpignan	4
3	1995	(England) Birmingham	8
4	1997	(Turkey) Istanbul	8
5	1999	(Cuba) Havana	8
6	2001	(Italy) Florence	8
7	2003	(France) Nîmes	8
8	2005	(Denmark) Aalborg	8
9	2007	(Turkey) İzmir	16
10	2009	(Poland) Rzeszów	16
11	2012	(United States) Las Vegas	16
12	2014	(France) Nîmes	16
13	2016	(Turkey) Ankara	16
14	2018	(United States) Yankton	16

== Host cities ==
Host cities of the World Indoor Archery Championships (North America)
Host cities of the World Indoor Archery Championships (Europe)

== Champions ==
=== Recurve ===
Year	Location	Men's Individual	Women's Individual	Men's Team	Women's Team	Ref
1991	(Finland) Oulu	Sebastien Flute (FRA)	Natalia Valeeva (URS)	No event	No event	
1993	(France) Perpignan	Gennady Metrofanov (RUS)	Jennifer O'Donnell (USA)	No event	No event	
1995	(England) Birmingham	Magnus Petersson (SWE)	Natalia Valeeva (MDA)	United States	Ukraine	
1997	(Turkey) Istanbul	Chung Jae-Hun (KOR)	Tetiana Muntian (UKR)	South Korea	Germany	
1999	(Cuba) Havana	Magnus Petersson (SWE)	Natalia Valeeva (ITA)	Australia	France	
2001	(Italy) Florence	Michele Frangilli (ITA)	Natalia Valeeva (ITA)	United States	Russia	
2003	(France) Nîmes	Ilario di Buo (ITA)	Berengere Schuh (FRA)	Italy	Ukraine	
2005	(Denmark) Aalborg	Erdem Zhigzhitov (RUS)	Nataliya Burdeyna (UKR)	Ukraine	France	
2007	(Turkey) İzmir	Sebastian Rohrberg (GER)	Nami Hayakawa (JPN)	Italy	France	
2009	(Poland) Rzeszów	Yavor Hristov (BUL)	Karina Winter (GER)	United States	Italy	
2012	(United States) Las Vegas	Marco Galiazzo (ITA)	Natalia Valeeva (ITA)	United States	United States	
2014	(France) Nîmes	Ryan Tyack (AUS)	Aida Roman (MEX)	Ukraine	Ukraine	
2016	(Turkey) Ankara	Heorhiy Ivanytskyy (UKR)	Lisa Unruh (GER)	Germany	Japan	
2018	(United States) Yankton	Sjef van den Berg (NED)	Elena Richter (GER)	Netherlands	Germany	

=== Compound ===
Year	Location	Men's Individual	Women's Individual	Men's Team	Women's Team	Ref
1991	(Finland) Oulu	Joe Asay (USA)	Lucio Panico (ITA)	No event	No event	
1993	(France) Perpignan	Kirk Ethridge (USA)	Inga Low (USA)	No event	No event	
1995	(England) Birmingham	Mike Hendrikse (USA)	Glenda Doran (USA)	United States	United States	
1997	(Turkey) Istanbul	Dee Wilde (USA)	Valerie Fabre (FRA)	Sweden	United States	
1999	(Cuba) Havana	James Butts (USA)	Ashley Kamuf (USA)	United States	France	
2001	(Italy) Florence	Morgan Lundin (SWE)	Mary Zorn (USA)	Italy	United States	
2003	(France) Nîmes	Reo Wilde (USA)	Gladys Willems (BEL)	United States	United States	
2005	(Denmark) Aalborg	Reo Wilde (USA)	Mary Zorn (USA)	United States	United States	
2007	(Turkey) İzmir	Braden Gellenthien (USA)	Eugenia Salvi (ITA)	United States	United States	
2009	(Poland) Rzeszów	Chance Beaubouef (USA)	Mary Zorn (USA)	United States	United States	
2012	(United States) Las Vegas	Reo Wilde (USA)	Viktoria Balzhanova (RUS)	United States	United States	
2014	(France) Nîmes	Sergio Pagni (ITA)	Sophie Dodemont (FRA)	United States	Mexico	
2016	(Turkey) Ankara	Sebastien Peineau (FRA)	Irene Franchini (ITA)	Italy	Denmark	
2018	(United States) Yankton	Mike Schloesser (NED)	Natalia Avdeeva (RUS)	United States	United States	

=== Recurve Junior ===
Year	Location	Men's Individual	Women's Individual	Men's Team	Women's Team	Ref
2001	(Italy) Florence	Marco Galiazzo (ITA)	Kateryna Serdiuk (UKR)	Ukraine	Ukraine	
2003	(France) Nîmes	Yoann Palermo (FRA)	Halyna Dobyeva (UKR)	Italy	Poland	
2005	(Denmark) Aalborg	Andres Gomez (ESP)	Pia Carmen Lionetti (ITA)	Russia	Italy	
2007	(Turkey) İzmir	Taras Senyuk (UKR)	Sonamaa Kuular (RUS)	Ukraine	Russia	
2009	(Poland) Rzeszów	Ivan Denis (BEL)	Joanna Kaminska (POL)	Ukraine	Poland	
2012	(United States) Las Vegas	Luca Maran (ITA)	Kristina Timofeeva (RUS)	Russia	Ukraine	
2014	(France) Nîmes	Maximilian Weckmüller (GER)	Tatiana Andreoli (ITA)	France	Italy	
2016	(Turkey) Ankara	David Pasqualucci (ITA)	Su Szu-Ping (TPE)	Italy	Italy	
2018	(United States) Yankton	Ivan Kozhokar (UKR)	Ariuna Budaeva (RUS)	Iran	Italy	

=== Compound Junior ===
Year	Location	Men's Individual	Women's Individual	Men's Team	Women's Team	Ref
2001	(Italy) Florence	Robert Karlsson (SWE)	Marleigh Bogumil (USA)	United States	United States	
2003	(France) Nîmes	Sebastien Brasseur (FRA)	Caroline Martret (FRA)	United States	United States	
2005	(Denmark) Aalborg	Brady Ellison (USA)	Tiffany Reeves (USA)	United States	United States	
2007	(Turkey) İzmir	Ayur Abidduev (RUS)	Anastasia Anastasio (ITA)	United States	Russia	
2009	(Poland) Rzeszów	Kristofer Schaff (USA)	Svetlana Cherkashneva (RUS)	Italy	United States	
2012	(United States) Las Vegas	Bridger Deaton (USA)	Runa Grydeland (NOR)	United States	Russia	
2014	(France) Nîmes	Viktor Orosz (HUN)	Mariya Shkolna (UKR)	United States	Turkey	
2016	(Turkey) Ankara	Viktor Orosz (HUN)	Lucia Valeria Chavarria (MEX)	Russia	Turkey	
2018	(United States) Yankton	Simon Olsen (DEN)	Cassidy Cox (USA)	United States	United States	
