= Ukraine at the 2005 Summer Universiade =

- IOC code: UKR

in İzmir 11 — 22 August 2005
- Competitors: 147 in 12 sports
- Medals Ranked 4th: Gold 18 Silver 16 Bronze 17 Total 51

Summer Universiade appearances (overview)
- 1993; 1995; 1997; 1999; 2001; 2003; 2005; 2007; 2009; 2011; 2013; 2015; 2017; 2019; 2021; 2025; 2027

Ukraine competed at the 2005 Summer Universiade in İzmir, Turkey, from 11 to 22 August 2005. Ukrainian athletes did not compete in football, volleyball, and water polo.

== Medal summary ==
=== Medal by sports ===
Medals by sport
| Sport | 1st place, gold medalist(s) | 2nd place, silver medalist(s) | 3rd place, bronze medalist(s) | Total |
|---|---|---|---|---|
| Rhythmic gymnastics | 5 | 4 | 4 | 13 |
| Swimming | 5 | 1 | 3 | 9 |
| Athletics | 3 | 4 | 4 | 11 |
| Fencing | 2 | 1 | 2 | 5 |
| Wrestling | 2 | 1 | 2 | 5 |
| Archery | 1 | 2 | 1 | 4 |
| Artistic gymnastics | 0 | 1 | 1 | 2 |
| Basketball | 0 | 1 | 0 | 1 |
| Diving | 0 | 1 | 0 | 1 |
| Total | 18 | 16 | 17 | 51 |

=== Medalists ===
| Medal | Name | Sport | Event |
|---|---|---|---|
| Gold | Ivan Heshko | Athletics | Men's 1500 metres |
| Gold | Volodymyr Zyuskov | Athletics | Men's long jump |
| Gold | Lyudmyla Blonska | Athletics | Women's heptathlon |
| Gold | Dmytro Hrachov; Viktor Ruban; Oleksandr Serdyuk | Archery | Men's team recurve |
| Gold | Vitaliy Osharov; Dmytro Chumak; Dmytro Karyuchenko | Fencing | Men's team épée |
| Gold | Yana Shemyakina; Olha Partala; Nadiya Kazimirchuk; Tetiana Novakovska | Fencing | Women's team épée |
| Gold | Anna Bessonova | Rhythmic gymnastics | Women's individual all-Around |
| Gold | Anna Bessonova | Rhythmic gymnastics | Women's ball |
| Gold | Anna Bessonova | Rhythmic gymnastics | Women's clubs |
| Gold | Natalia Hodunko | Rhythmic gymnastics | Women's ribbon |
| Gold | Anna Bessonova | Rhythmic gymnastics | Women's rope |
| Gold | Oleh Lisohor | Swimming | Men's 50 m breaststroke |
| Gold | Oleh Lisohor | Swimming | Men's 100 m breaststroke |
| Gold | Serhiy Breus | Swimming | Men's 50 m butterfly |
| Gold | Serhiy Breus | Swimming | Men's 100 m butterfly |
| Gold | Anton Bugayov; Oleh Lisohor; Serhiy Advena; Denys Syzonenko | Swimming | Men's 4×100 metres medley relay |
| Gold | Oleh Kushnir | Wrestling | Men's freestyle 84 kg |
| Gold | Iryna Merleni | Wrestling | Women's freestyle 51 kg |
| Silver | Tetyana Holovchenko | Athletics | Women's 1500 metres |
| Silver | Tetyana Holovchenko | Athletics | Women's 5000 metres |
| Silver | Iryna Kovalenko | Athletics | Women's high jump |
| Silver | Olha Saladuha | Athletics | Women's triple jump |
| Silver | Kateryna Palekha | Archery | Women's individual recurve |
| Silver | Tetyana Berezhna; Viktoriya Koval; Kateryna Palekha | Archery | Women's team recurve |
| Silver | Ukraine national student basketball team: Stanislav Balashov Artem Butskyy Kyrylo Fesenko Roman Humeniuk Viktor Kobzystyi Dmytro Korabliov Volodymyr Koval Ihor Kryvych Rostyslav Kryvych Andrii Lebediev Oleksiy Pecherov Yevhen Podorvannyi | Football | Men's team |
| Silver | Olena Fedorova | Diving | Women's 1 metre springboard |
| Silver | Vladyslav Tretiak; Dmytro Boiko; Volodymyr Lukashenko; Oleh Shturbabin | Fencing | Men's team sabre |
| Silver | Natalia Hodunko | Rhythmic gymnastics | Women's ball |
| Silver | Natalia Hodunko | Rhythmic gymnastics | Women's clubs |
| Silver | Natalia Hodunko | Rhythmic gymnastics | Women's rope |
| Silver | Anna Tuktarova; Zinaida Bondarenko; Kateryna Annenkova; Inha Kozhohina; Oleksandra Perezhohina; Maryna Bykhanova | Rhythmic gymnastics | Women's group 5 ribbon |
| Silver | Valeriy Dymo | Swimming | Men's 50 m breaststroke |
| Silver | Kateryna Burmistrova | Wrestling | Women's freestyle 72 kg |
| Bronze | Serhiy Demydyuk | Athletics | Men's 110 metres hurdles |
| Bronze | Oleksandr Korchmid | Athletics | Men's pole vault |
| Bronze | Mykola Savolaynen | Athletics | Men's triple jump |
| Bronze | Antonina Yefremova; Olha Zavhorodnya; Nataliya Pyhyda; Liliya Lobanova; Anastasiya Rabchenyuk | Athletics | Women's 4 × 400 metres relay |
| Bronze | Viktoriya Koval | Archery | Women's individual recurve |
| Bronze | Dmytro Chumak | Fencing | Men's individual épée |
| Bronze | Vladyslav Tretiak | Fencing | Men's individual sabre |
| Bronze | Natalia Hodunko | Rhythmic gymnastics | Women's individual all-around |
| Bronze | Anna Bessonova | Rhythmic gymnastics | Women's ribbon |
| Bronze | Anna Tuktarova; Zinaida Bondarenko; Kateryna Annenkova; Inha Kozhohina; Oleksandra Perezhohina; Maryna Bykhanova | Rhythmic gymnastics | Women's group all-around |
| Bronze | Anna Tuktarova; Zinaida Bondarenko; Kateryna Annenkova; Inha Kozhohina; Oleksandra Perezhohina; Maryna Bykhanova | Rhythmic gymnastics | Women's group 3 hoops + 4 clubs |
| Bronze | Ihor Chervynskyy | Swimming | Men's 1500 m freestyle |
| Bronze | Serhiy Advena | Swimming | Men's 100 m butterfly |
| Bronze | Iryna Amshennikova | Swimming | Women's 100 m backstroke |
| Bronze | Oleksandra Kohut | Wrestling | Women's freestyle 48 kg |
| Bronze | Olha Levkovska | Wrestling | Women's freestyle 55 kg |

== See also ==
- Ukraine at the 2005 Winter Universiade
