= 2018 World Indoor Archery Championships =

International archery competition

- Venue: NFAA Easton Yankton Archery Center
- Location: Yankton, United States
- Start date: 14 February
- End date: 19 February
- Competitors: 207 from 31 nations

The 2018 World Archery Championships was the 14th edition of the World Indoor Archery Championships. The event was held in Yankton, United States from 14 February to 19 February 2018 and was organised by World Archery (formerly known as FITA). Qualification and elimination rounds took place at the NFAA Easton Yankton Archery Center.

The programme featured was the same as previous World Archery Championships, with individual and team events in the compound and recurve disciplines.

== Medal summary ==
=== Recurve ===
==== Senior ====
Event	Gold	Silver	Bronze
Men's individual	Sjef van den Berg; Netherlands	Daisuke Tomatsu; Japan	Taylor Worth; Australia
Women's individual	Elena Richter; Germany	Aída Román; Mexico	Audrey Adiceom; France
Men's team	Netherlands; Sjef van den Berg; Rick van der Ven; Steve Wijler	Australia; Astin Darcy; Ryan Tyack; Taylor Worth	Ukraine; Oleksii Hunbin; Heorhiy Ivanytskyy; Viktor Ruban
Women's team	Germany; Michelle Kroppen; Elena Richter; Lisa Unruh	Russia; Tuyana Dashidorzhieva; Elena Osipova; Sayana Tsyrempilova	Ukraine; Veronika Marchenko; Anastasia Pavlova; Solomiya Trapeznikova

==== Junior ====
Event	Gold	Silver	Bronze
Men's individual	Ivan Kozhokar; Ukraine	Mete Gazoz; Turkey	Oleksandr Pantsyru; Ukraine
Women's individual	Ariuna Budaeva; Russia	Svetlana Gomboeva; Russia	Sandra Garza; Mexico
Men's team	Iran; Seyedabolfazl Hosseini; Kiyan Moradi; Reza Shabani	Ukraine; Ivan Kozhokar; Oleksandr Pantsyru; Roman Sheremet	United States; Trenton Cowles; Adam Heidt; Seth McWherter
Women's team	Italy; Tatiana Andreoli; Tanya Giaccheri; Aiko Rolando	Russia; Ariuna Budaeva; Svetlana Gomboeva; Tatiana Plotnikova	Ukraine; Orysia Didych; Kateryna Mazorchuk; Zhanna Naumova

=== Compound ===
==== Senior ====
Event	Gold	Silver	Bronze
Men's individual	Mike Schloesser; Netherlands	Sergio Pagni; Italy	Jesse Broadwater; United States
Women's individual	Natalia Avdeeva; Russia	Yeşim Bostan; Turkey	Dawn Groszko; Canada
Men's team	United States; Jesse Broadwater; Tate Morgan; Kristofer Schaff	Italy; Viviano Mior; Sergio Pagni; Alberto Simonelli	Netherlands; Peter Elzinga; Sil Pater; Mike Schloesser
Women's team	United States; Mary Hamm; Paige Pearce-Gore; Breanna Theodore	Russia; Natalia Avdeeva; Viktoria Balzhanova; Alexandra Savenkova	Canada; Dawn Groszko; Madison Hart; Fiona McClean

==== Junior ====
Event	Gold	Silver	Bronze
Men's individual	Simon Olsen; Denmark	Curtis Broadnax; United States	Remy Leonard; Australia
Women's individual	Cassidy Cox; United States	Elisa Roner; Italy	Asstrid Alanis; Mexico
Men's team	United States; Curtis Broadnax; Zachary Harris; Ethan King	Australia; Harri Howden; Remy Leonard; Hamish Thompson	Canada; Cole Beres; Tristan Spicer-Moran; Austin Taylor
Women's team	United States; Athena Caiopoulos; Cassidy Cox; Anna Scarbrough	Canada; Bryanne Lameg; J'lynn Mitchell; Ashlyn Scriveni	Italy; Elisa Bazzichetto; Sara Ret; Elisa Roner

=== Medal table ===
Rank	Nation	Gold	Silver	Bronze	Total
1	United States (USA)	5	1	2	8
2	Netherlands (NED)	3	0	1	4
3	Russia (RUS)	2	4	0	6
4	Germany (GER)	2	0	0	2
5	Italy (ITA)	1	3	1	5
6	Ukraine (UKR)	1	1	4	6
7	Denmark (DEN)	1	0	0	1
7	Iran (IRI)	1	0	0	1
9	Australia (AUS)	0	2	2	4
10	Turkey (TUR)	0	2	0	2
11	Canada (CAN)	0	1	3	4
12	Mexico (MEX)	0	1	2	3
13	Japan (JPN)	0	1	0	1
14	France (FRA)	0	0	1	1
Totals (14 entries)		16	16	16	48

== Participating nations ==
At the close of registrations, a 31 nations had registered 207 athletes, 3 fewer country and 55 athletes fewer than in Ankara in 2016.

- Australia (12)
- Austria (4)
- Belgium (1)
- Belarus (1)
- Brazil (1)
- Canada (11)
- Croatia (3)
- Denmark (9)
- France (10)
- Great Britain (5)
- Germany (8)
- Hungary (1)
- Iran (9)
- Iraq (1)
- Italy (18)
- Japan (7)
- Luxembourg (1)
- Moldova (3)
- Mexico (20)
- Mongolia (3)
- Netherlands (6)
- New Zealand (1)
- Paraguay (1)
- Poland (6)
- Russia (15)
- Slovenia (6)
- Serbia (1)
- Switzerland (3)
- Turkey (4)
- Ukraine (12)
- United States (24) host
