= 2011 European Indoor Archery Championships =

2011 Archery European Indoor Championships is 13th edition of European Indoor Championships in Archery which was held in Cambrils, Spain between 21–27 March 2011.

== Senior Results ==
=== Men ===
Event	Gold	Silver	Bronze
Compound individual	Ruben Bleyendaal (NED)	Sebastien Peineau (FRA)	Morten Bøe (NOR)
Compound team	Martin Damsbo; Patrick Laursen; Torben Johannessen; Denmark	Peter Elzinga; Sander Dolderman; Ruben Bleyendaal; Netherlands	Dominique Genet; Sébastien Peineau; Christophe Doussot; France
Recurve individual	Mauro Nespoli (ITA)	Alexander Kozhin (RUS)	Viktor Ruban (UKR)
Recurve team	Viktor Ruban; Markiyan Ivashko; Yuri Havelko; Ukraine	Alexandr Kozhin; Belikto Tsyrempilov; Chingis Tcyrendashiev; Russia	Mauro Nespoli; Luca Maran; Michele Frangilli; Italy

=== Women ===
Event	Gold	Silver	Bronze
Compound individual	Marcella Tonioli (ITA)	Albina Loginova (RUS)	Fatima Agudo (ESP)
Compound Team	Viktoria Balzhanova; Albina Loginova; Natalia Avdeyeva; Russia	Eugenia Salvi; Katia D'Agostino; Marcella Tonioli; Italy	Fátima Agudo; Irene Cuesta; Julia Benito; Spain
Recurve individual	Tatyana Boroday (RUS)	Natalia Valeeva (ITA)	Coby Hurkmans (NED)
Recurve Team	Khatuna Narimanidze; Kristine Esebua; Asmat Diasamidze; Georgia	Tetyana Dorokhova; Viktoriya Koval; Tetyana Berezhna; Ukraine	Tatiana Borodai; Anna Bomboyeva; Natalia Erdyniyeva; Russia

== Junior Results ==
=== Men ===
Event	Gold	Silver	Bronze
Compound individual	Jacopo Polidori (ITA)	Ihor Kardash (UKR)	Nicklas Friese (DEN)
Compound team	Jacopo Polidori; Luca Fanti; Alessandro Maresca; Italy	Andreas Darum; Nicklas Friese; Mads Knudsen; Denmark	Vladyslav Bolshakov; Mykhaylo Bozhko; Ihor Kardash; Ukraine
Recurve individual	Bolot Tsybzhitov (RUS)	Antonio Fernandez (ESP)	Camilo Mayr (GER)
Recurve team	Juan Ignacio Rodríguez; Antonio Fernandez; Jose Carlos Olandia; Spain	Konstantin Sanzhitsybikov; Sanzhi-Zhanchip Tsydenzhapov; Bolot Tsybzhitov; Russia	Yevhen Marchenko; Heorhiy Ivanytskyy; Valentin Sobko; Ukraine

=== Women ===
Event	Gold	Silver	Bronze
Compound individual	Sarah Sonnichsen (DEN)	Toja Černe (SLO)	Deborah Grillo (ITA)
Compound Team	Ekatarina Korobeynikova; Anna Artemova; Svetlana Cherkashneva; Russia	Sarah Sonnichsen; Michalina Josephine Sigil; Ida Frandsen; Denmark	Deborah Grillo; Giulia Cavalleri; Elisabetta Landi; Italy
Recurve individual	Olga Buliga (UKR)	Tuyana Dashidorzhieva (RUS)	Lidiia Sichenikova (UKR)
Recurve Team	Lidiia Sichenikova; Olga Buliga; Anastasia Pavlova; Ukraine	Tatiana Segina; Sayana Tsyrempilova; Tuyana Dashidorzhieva; Russia	Margalida Ribas; Mirian Alarcon; Helena Fernandez; Spain

== Participated countries ==
25 take part in elite competition. Some countries also send archers, officials and judges, but they participated only in junior events.

- Austria (4)
- Belgium (1)
- Bulgaria (1)
- Croatia (3)
- Denmark (4)
- Spain (9)
- Estonia (3)
- Finland (7)
- France (7)
- Great Britain (3)
- Georgia (3)
- Greece (2)
- Israel (3)
- Italy (12)
- Latvia (1)
- Lithuania (3)
- Moldova (3)
- Netherlands (10)
- Norway (4)
- Poland (7)
- Russia (11)
- Slovenia (3)
- Switzerland (5)
- Turkey (1)
- Ukraine (12)
