= Wrestling at the 2005 Summer Universiade =

Wrestling at the XXIII Summer Universiade
- Venue: Özel Yamanlar High School Sports Hall
- Dates: 13–17 August

The Wrestling competition in the 2005 Summer Universiade were held in İzmir, Turkey.

== Medal summary ==
=== Men's freestyle ===
Event	Gold	Silver	Bronze
55 kg	Bayaraagiin Naranbaatar; Mongolia	Vahan Simonyan; Armenia	Namig Sevdimov; Azerbaijan
55 kg	Bayaraagiin Naranbaatar; Mongolia	Vahan Simonyan; Armenia	Yoo Hyun-jin; South Korea
60 kg	Nate Gallick; United States	Tevfik Odabaşı; Turkey	Aleksandr Kontoev; Russia
60 kg	Nate Gallick; United States	Tevfik Odabaşı; Turkey	Abbas Biglarbeigi; Iran
66 kg	Jesse Jantzen; United States	Berdia Kalekhsaev; Russia	Otar Tushishvili; Georgia
66 kg	Jesse Jantzen; United States	Berdia Kalekhsaev; Russia	Kang Kum-chol; North Korea
74 kg	Hadi Habibi; Iran	Krystian Brzozowski; Poland	Kang Sang-woo; South Korea
74 kg	Hadi Habibi; Iran	Krystian Brzozowski; Poland	Fahrettin Özata; Turkey
84 kg	Oleg Kushnir; Ukraine	Majid Khodaei; Iran	Evgeny Kulish; Russia
84 kg	Oleg Kushnir; Ukraine	Majid Khodaei; Iran	Gökhan Yavaşer; Turkey
96 kg	Tommy Rowlands; United States	Hakan Koç; Turkey	Koo Tae-hyun; South Korea
96 kg	Tommy Rowlands; United States	Hakan Koç; Turkey	Siarhei Pernikau; Belarus
120 kg	Sait Bingöl; Turkey	Aleksey Voronin; Russia	Andrey Svatkovskiy; Kazakhstan
120 kg	Sait Bingöl; Turkey	Aleksey Voronin; Russia	Davit Otiashvili; Georgia

=== Men's Greco-Roman ===
Event	Gold	Silver	Bronze
55 kg	Ri Kyong-il; North Korea	Hassan Rangraz; Iran	Askar Zhursymbayev; Kazakhstan
55 kg	Ri Kyong-il; North Korea	Hassan Rangraz; Iran	Goderdzi Davitadze; Georgia
60 kg	Ali Ashkani; Iran	Kim Geon-hai; South Korea	Yerbol Konyratov; Kazakhstan
60 kg	Ali Ashkani; Iran	Kim Geon-hai; South Korea	Roberto Monzón; Cuba
66 kg	Selçuk Çebi; Turkey	Jung Ji-hyun; South Korea	Justin Lester; United States
66 kg	Selçuk Çebi; Turkey	Jung Ji-hyun; South Korea	Matti Kautto; Finland
74 kg	Şeref Tüfenk; Turkey	Radosław Truszkowski; Poland	Edgar Babayan; Armenia
74 kg	Şeref Tüfenk; Turkey	Radosław Truszkowski; Poland	Tsukasa Tsurumaki; Japan
84 kg	Shalva Gadabadze; Georgia	Björn Holk; Germany	Reinier Corrales; Cuba
84 kg	Shalva Gadabadze; Georgia	Björn Holk; Germany	Vahram Galstyan; Armenia
96 kg	Margulan Assembekov; Kazakhstan	Hamdi Eraslankılıç; Turkey	Heiki Nabi; Estonia
96 kg	Margulan Assembekov; Kazakhstan	Hamdi Eraslankılıç; Turkey	Robert Petrosyan; Armenia
120 kg	Mijaín López; Cuba	Yekta Yılmaz Gül; Turkey	Mindaugas Mizgaitis; Lithuania
120 kg	Mijaín López; Cuba	Yekta Yılmaz Gül; Turkey	Mehdi Sharabiani; Iran

=== Women's freestyle ===
Event	Gold	Silver	Bronze
48 kg	Carol Huynh; Canada	Yuri Funatsu; Japan	Oleksandra Kohut; Ukraine
48 kg	Carol Huynh; Canada	Yuri Funatsu; Japan	Sara Fulp-Allen; United States
51 kg	Iryna Merleni; Ukraine	Lyndsay Belisle; Canada	Mary Kelly; United States
51 kg	Iryna Merleni; Ukraine	Lyndsay Belisle; Canada	Alena Kareisha; Belarus
55 kg	Saori Yoshida; Japan	Tonya Verbeek; Canada	Olha Levkovska; Ukraine
55 kg	Saori Yoshida; Japan	Tonya Verbeek; Canada	Marcie Van Dusen; United States
59 kg	Ayako Shoda; Japan	Justyna Barciak; Poland	Breanne Graham; Canada
59 kg	Ayako Shoda; Japan	Justyna Barciak; Poland	Lee Yeon-mi; South Korea
63 kg	Kaori Icho; Japan	Volha Khilko; Belarus	Meryem Selloum; France
63 kg	Kaori Icho; Japan	Volha Khilko; Belarus	Alaina Berube; United States
67 kg	Mami Shinkai; Japan	Hatun Muhçu; Turkey	Stefanie Howorun; Canada
67 kg	Mami Shinkai; Japan	Hatun Muhçu; Turkey	Natalia Kysina; Russia
72 kg	Ohenewa Akuffo; Canada	Kateryna Burmistrova; Ukraine	Ayako Murashima; Japan
72 kg	Ohenewa Akuffo; Canada	Kateryna Burmistrova; Ukraine	Agnieszka Wieszczek; Poland

== Medal table ==
Rank	Nation	Gold	Silver	Bronze	Total
1	Japan	4	1	2	7
2	Turkey	3	5	2	10
3	United States	3	0	5	8
4	Canada	2	2	2	6
4	Iran	2	2	2	6
6	Ukraine	2	1	2	5
7	Georgia	1	0	3	4
7	Kazakhstan	1	0	3	4
9	Cuba	1	0	2	3
10	North Korea	1	0	1	2
11	Mongolia	1	0	0	1
12	Poland	0	3	1	4
13	South Korea	0	2	4	6
14	Russia	0	2	3	5
15	Armenia	0	1	3	4
16	Belarus	0	1	2	3
17	Germany	0	1	0	1
18	Azerbaijan	0	0	1	1
18	Estonia	0	0	1	1
18	Finland	0	0	1	1
18	France	0	0	1	1
18	Lithuania	0	0	1	1
Totals (22 entries)		21	21	42	84
