= 2004 European Archery Championships =

2004 European Championships
- Location: Brussels, Belgium
- Dates: 17-22 May 2004

The 2004 European Archery Championships is the 18th edition of the European Archery Championships. The event was held in Brussels, Belgium from 17 to 22 May, 2004.

== Medal table ==
* Host nation (Belgium)

Rank	Nation	Gold	Silver	Bronze	Total
1	France	3	0	1	4
2	Netherlands	2	1	2	5
3	Italy	1	2	1	4
4	Poland	1	0	1	2
5	Ukraine	1	0	0	1
6	Denmark	0	2	1	3
7	Great Britain	0	2	0	2
8	Russia	0	1	0	1
9	Belarus	0	0	1	1
9	Germany	0	0	1	1
Totals (10 entries)		8	8	8	24

== Medal summary ==
=== Recurve ===
Event	Gold	Silver	Bronze
Men's individual	Italy; Marco Galiazzo	Denmark; Hasse Pavia Lind	Netherlands; Pieter Custers
Women's individual	Poland; Iwona Marcinkiewicz	United Kingdom; Alison Williamson	Belarus; Hanna Marusava
Men's team	Netherlands; Wietse van Alten; Ron van der Hoff; Pieter Custers; Henk Vogels	United Kingdom; Larry Godfrey; Simon Needham; Al Wills	Denmark; Hasse Pavia Lind; Dennis Bager; Morten Caspersen; Bo Steimann
Women's team	Ukraine; Kateryna Palekha; Tetyana Berezhna; Tetyana Dorokhova; Yuliya Lobzhenidze	Italy; Cristina Ioriatti; Pia Lionetti; Natalia Valeeva	Poland; Justyna Mospinek; Iwona Marcinkiewicz; Małgorzata Sobieraj

=== Compound ===
Event	Gold	Silver	Bronze
Men's individual	Netherlands; Peter Elzinga	Italy; Antonio Tosco	Netherlands; Fred van Zutphen
Women's individual	France; Valerie Fabre	Denmark; Louise Hauge	France; Sandrine Vandionant
Men's team	France	Netherlands	Italy
Women's team	France	Russia	Germany
