= 2006 European Archery Championships =

2006 European Championships
- Location: Athens, Greece
- Dates: 13-16 September 2006

The 2006 European Archery Championships is the 19th edition of the European Archery Championships. The event was held in Athens, Greece from 13 to 16 September, 2006.

== Medal table ==
* Host nation (Greece)

Rank	Nation	Gold	Silver	Bronze	Total
1	Sweden	2	0	0	2
2	France	1	1	2	4
3	Spain	1	1	1	3
4	Italy	1	0	2	3
5	Belarus	1	0	0	1
5	Denmark	1	0	0	1
5	Great Britain	1	0	0	1
8	Russia	0	2	0	2
9	Germany	0	1	1	2
10	Croatia	0	1	0	1
10	Finland	0	1	0	1
10	Ukraine	0	1	0	1
13	Poland	0	0	2	2
Totals (13 entries)		8	8	8	24

== Medal summary ==
=== Recurve ===
Event	Gold	Silver	Bronze
Men's individual	Sweden; Magnus Petersson	Germany; Michael Frankenberg	Poland; Piotr Piątek
Women's individual	Spain; Almudena Gallardo	Russia; Tatiana Borodai	Italy; Pia Lionetti
Men's team	Belarus; Anton Prilepav; Mikalai Marusau; Siarhei Vitorski	Spain; Daniel Morillo; Felipe López; Andrés Gómez	Italy; Michele Frangilli; Marco Galiazzo; Ilario Di Buò
Women's team	United Kingdom; Alison Williamson; Naomi Folkard; Lana Needham	Ukraine; Yuliya Lobzhenidze; Tetyana Berezhna; Tetyana Dorokhova	Poland; Justyna Mospinek; Iwona Marcinkiewicz; Małgorzata Sobieraj

=== Compound ===
Event	Gold	Silver	Bronze
Men's individual	France; Sebastien Brasseur	France; Stephane Dardenne	Spain; Jose Duo
Women's individual	Denmark; Camilla Soemod	Finland; Anne Laurila	France; Amandine Bouillot
Men's team	Sweden; Anders Malm; Morgan Lundin; Magnus Carlsson	Croatia; Goran Villi; Dario Gregeć; Darko Uidl	Germany; Paul Titscher; Stefan Griem; Thomas Hasenfuss
Women's team	Italy; Giorgia Solato; Assunta Atorino; Eugenia Salvi	Russia; Albina Loginova; Sofia Goncharova; Anna Kazantseva	France; Amandine Bouillot; Amandine Bouillot; Valérie Fabre
