= 2007 World Indoor Archery Championships =

2007 World Indoor Target Archery Championships
- Location: İzmir, Turkey
- Start date: March 13
- End date: March 17

The 2007 World Indoor Target Archery Championships were held in İzmir, Turkey from 13 to 17 March 2007.

== Medal table ==
Rank	Nation	Gold	Silver	Bronze	Total
1	Russia	4	2	1	7
2	United States	4	1	4	9
3	Italy	3	2	2	7
4	Ukraine	2	2	2	6
5	France	1	2	3	6
6	Germany	1	2	0	3
7	Japan	1	0	0	1
8	Spain	0	2	0	2
9	Greece	0	1	0	1
9	Switzerland	0	1	0	1
9	Turkey	0	1	0	1
12	Poland	0	0	2	2
13	Great Britain	0	0	1	1
13	Netherlands	0	0	1	1
Totals (14 entries)		16	16	16	48

== Medal summary (individual) ==
Event	Gold	Silver	Bronze
Recurve Men's individual	Sebastian Rohrberg (GER)	Markiyan Ivashko (UKR)	Shawn Rice (USA)
Recurve Women's individual	Nami Hayakawa (JPN)	Bérengère Schuh (FRA)	Tetyana Dorokhova (UKR)
Compound Men's individual	Braden Gellenthien (USA)	Jose Duo (ESP)	Dominique Genet (FRA)
Compound Women's individual	Eugenia Salvi (ITA)	Fatima Agudo (ESP)	Paola Galletti (ITA)
Junior Recurve Men's individual	Taras Senyuk (UKR)	Rem Shakirov (RUS)	Aaron Tedford (USA)
Junior Recurve Women's individual	Sonamaa Kuular (RUS)	Maryna Veselovska (UKR)	Anna Fedorova (RUS)
Junior Compound Men's individual	Ayur Abidduev (RUS)	Kevin Marbacher (SUI)	Valentin van Huffel (FRA)
Junior Compound Women's individual	Anastasia Anastasio (ITA)	Eleni Ioannou (GRE)	Amber Lynn Christensen (USA)

== Medal summary (team) ==
Event	Gold	Silver	Bronze
Recurve Men's team	Italy (ITA); Michele Frangilli; Marco Galiazzo; Amedeo Tonelli	Germany (GER); Jan Christopher Ginzel; Daniel Hartmann; Sebastian Rohrberg	United States (USA); Staten Holmes; Shawn Rice; Victor Wunderle
Recurve Women's team	France (FRA); Laure Barczynski; Cyrielle Cotry; Bérengère Schuh	Germany (GER); Anja Hitzler; Lisa Unruh; Karina Winter	Ukraine (UKR); Tetyana Berezhna; Tetyana Dorokhova; Victoriya Koval
Compound Men's team	United States (USA); Dave Cousins; Braden Gellenthien; Reo Wilde	France (FRA); Sebastien Brasseur; Pierre Julien Deloche; Dominique Genet	Netherlands (NED); Emiel Custers; Peter Elzinga; Rob Polman
Compound Women's team	United States (USA); Christie Colin; Jamie van Natta; Holly Pagel	Russia (RUS); Sofia Goncharova; Svetlana Novikova; Oktyabrina Bolotova	Italy (ITA); Paola Galletti; Laura Longo; Eugenia Salvi
Junior Recurve Men's team	Ukraine (UKR); Oleksandr Malushyn; Taras Senyuk; Dmytro Shamatrin	Italy (ITA); Mandia Massimiliano; Luca Melotto; Lorenzo Giori	Poland (POL); Barteomiej Stanko; Dominik Szemic; Marcin Kloda
Junior Recurve Women's team	Russia (RUS); Anna Fedorova; Inna Stepanova; Sonamaa Kuular	Turkey (TUR); Gül Esen Çebi; Özlem Kılınçarslan; Büşra Saygın	Poland (POL); Ewelina Marszalkowska; Joanna Kaminska; Marta Gasiorek
Junior Compound Men's team	United States (USA); Ryan Day; Adam Wruck; Bryce Wickliffe	Italy (ITA); Pietro Greco; Luca Fanti; Jacopo Polidori	France (FRA); Quentin Cordier; Valentin van Huffel; Johann Gilbert
Junior Compound Women's team	Russia (RUS); Serzhunya Bolotova; Marina Mozhaykina; Evgeniya Vorosshnina	United States (USA); Amber Lynn Christensen; Elissa Falconer; Kendal Nicely	Great Britain (GBR); Emily Brown; Mary Perrott; Rosie Smith
