= Tetyana Berezhna =

Ukrainian archer (born 1982)

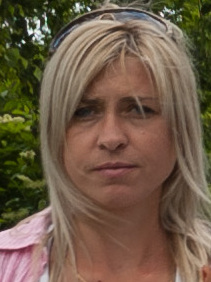

Personal information
- Full name: Tetyana Mykolayivna Berezhna
- Born: 13 November 1982 (age 43)

Sport
- Sport: Archery
Medal record
Women's Archery
Representing Ukraine
World Championships
Silver medal – second place	2005 Madrid	Team
World Indoor Championships
Gold medal – first place	2003 Nîmes	Team
Silver medal – second place	2005 Aalborg	Team
Bronze medal – third place	1999 Havana	Team
Bronze medal – third place	2001 Florence	Team
Bronze medal – third place	2007 Izmir	Team
European Championships
Gold medal – first place	2004 Brussels	Team
Silver medal – second place	2006 Athens	Team
European Indoor Championships
Gold medal – first place	2002 Ankara	Team
Silver medal – second place	2011 Cambrils	Team
Bronze medal – third place	2002 Ankara	Individual
Universiade
Silver medal – second place	2005 Izmir	Team
Bronze medal – third place	2003 Daegu	Team

Tetyana Mykolayivna Berezhna (Ukrainian: Тетяна Миколаївна Бережна; born 13 November 1982) is an archer from Ukraine.

Berezhna represented Ukraine at the 2004 Summer Olympics. She placed 14th in the women's individual ranking round with a 72-arrow score of 640. In the first round of elimination, she faced 51st-ranked Fotini Vavatsi of Greece. Berezhna defeated Vavatsi, winning 160-156 in the 18-arrow match to advance to the round of 32. In that round, she faced Jennifer Nichols of the United States, losing to the 19th-ranked archer 163-160 in the regulation 18 arrows. Berezhna finished 18th in women's individual archery. Berezhna was also a member of the 6th-place Ukrainian team in the women's team archery competition.

External images
- Tetyana Berezhna at 2008 Summer Olympics in Beijing at ETimes
- Tetyana Berezhna from www.archery.ua
- Tetyana Berezhna at rcherz.com

At the 2008 Summer Olympics in Beijing Berezhna finished her ranking round with a total of 627 points. This gave her the 38th seed for the final competition bracket in which she faced Zhang Juanjuan in the first round. The local Chinese home favourite who was the 27th seed would win the confrontation with 109-97 and would eventually go on to win the gold medal.

She served in the Armed Forces of Ukraine during the Russian invasion of Ukraine.
