= 2005 World Indoor Archery Championships =

2005 World Indoor Target Archery Championships
- Location: Aalborg, Denmark
- Start date: March 22
- End date: March 28

Champions
- Recurve Men's: (Russia) Erdem Zhigzhitov; Recurve Women's: (Ukraine) Nataliya Burdeyna; Compound Men's: (United States) Reo Wilde; Compound Women's: (United States) Mary Zorn; Recurve Men's Team: Ukraine; Recurve Women's Team: France; Compound Men's Team: United States; Compound Women's Team: United States

The 2005 World Indoor Target Archery Championships were held in Aalborg, Denmark from 22–28 March 2005.

== Medal summary (individual) ==
Event	Gold	Silver	Bronze
Recurve Men's individual	(Russia) Erdem Zhigzhitov	(United States) Victor Wunderle	(Ukraine) Oleksandr Serdyuk
Recurve Women's individual	(Ukraine) Nataliya Burdeyna	(Ukraine) Tetyana Dorokhova	(Germany) Christina Schafer
Compound Men's individual	(United States) Reo Wilde	(Sweden) Morgan Lundin	(Norway) Morten Boe
Compound Women's individual	(United States) Mary Zorn	(Spain) Fatima Agudo	(United States) Jamie van Natta

== Medal summary (team) ==
Event	Gold	Silver	Bronze
Recurve Men's team	Ukraine (UKR); Igor Parkhomenko; Markiyan Ivashko; Oleksandr Serdyuk	Italy (ITA); Marco Galiazzo; Michele Frangilli; Amedeo Tonelli	Russia (RUS); Andrey Abramov; Erdem Zhigzhitov; Balzhinima Tsyrempilov
Recurve Women's team	France (FRA); Fabienne Bourdon; Virginie Arnold; Svetlana Roudeva	Ukraine (UKR); Tetyana Berezhna; Tetyana Dorokhova; Nataliya Burdeyna	Poland (POL); Malgorzata Sobieraj; Karina Lipiarska; Izabela Niemiec
Compound Men's team	United States (USA); Dave Cousins; Rod Menzer; Reo Wilde	Italy (ITA); Stefano Mazzi; Antonio Tosco; Daniele Bauro	Denmark (DEN); Martin Damsbo; Tom Henriksen; Niels Dall
Compound Women's team	United States (USA); Mary Zorn; Jamie van Natta; Amber Dawson	Russia (RUS); Oktyabrina Bolotova; Sofya Goncharova; Svetlana Kondrashenko	France (FRA); Valerie Fabre; Francoise Volle; Anne-Marie Bloch

== Notes ==
World Record 269 points scored by the United States Compound Men's team.
