= Chin Chiu-yueh =

Taiwanese archer (born 1968)

Chin Chiu-Yueh (born 1 February 1968) is an archer who represented Chinese Taipei.

== Archery ==
Chin finished 27th at the 1988 Summer Olympic Games in the women's individual event. She also finished eleventh in the women's team event as part of the Chinese Taipei team as part of the Chinese Taipei team.

She won a silver medal in the freestyle women's individual event at the 1991 World Indoor Archery Championships.
