= Markiyan Ivashko =

Ukrainian archer (born 1979)

Medal record

Men's archery

Representing Ukraine

World Indoor Championships
Gold medal – first place	2005 Aalborg	Team
Gold medal – first place	2014 Nîmes	Team
Silver medal – second place	1999 Havana	Individual
Silver medal – second place	2007 İzmir	Individual

European Games
Gold medal – first place	2015 Baku	Men's team

European Archery Championships
Silver medal – second place	2008 Vittel	Individual
Bronze medal – third place	2010 Aalborg	Individual
Bronze medal – third place	2012 Amsterdam	Team

European Indoor Championships
Gold medal – first place	2006 Jaén	Team
Gold medal – first place	2011 Cambrils	Team
Silver medal – second place	2006 Jaén	Individual
Silver medal – second place	2010 Poreč	Team
Bronze medal – third place	2010 Poreč	Individual

Markiyan Volodymyrovych Ivashko (Ukrainian: Маркіян Володимирович Івашко, born 18 May 1979) is a Ukrainian archer.

== 2008 Summer Olympics ==
At the 2008 Summer Olympics in Beijing, Ivashko finished his ranking round with a total of 658 points, which gave him the 32nd seed for the final competition bracket in which he faced Daniel Morillo in the first round. The Spanish archer won the match by 115–107. Morillo would be eliminated in the following round by Juan René Serrano.

Together with Oleksandr Serdyuk and Viktor Ruban he also took part in the team event. With his 658 score from the ranking round combined with the 678 of Ruban and the 676 of Serdyuk, Ukraine was in second position after the ranking round, which gave them a straight seed into the quarter-finals. With 214–211 they were too strong for the Chinese Taipei team, but in the semi-final they were eliminated by Italy, 223–221. In the challenge for the bronze medal China was too strong with 222–219.

== 2012 Summer Olympics ==
At the 2012, Ivashko was knocked out in the last 16 of the men's individual competition and he was part of the Ukrainian team that was knocked out at the quarter-finals stage of the men's team competition.
