= Tetyana Dorokhova =

Ukrainian archer (born 1985)

Personal information
- National team: 2011
- Born: 3 June 1985 (age 41)

Sport
- Country: Ukraine
- Sport: Archery
- Event: Recurve
Medal record
World Championships
Bronze medal – third place	2003 New York City	Team
World Indoor Championships
Gold medal – first place	2003 Nîmes	Team
Silver medal – second place	2005 Aalborg	Team
Silver medal – second place	2005 Aalborg	Individual
Bronze medal – third place	2007 İzmir	Team
Bronze medal – third place	2007 İzmir	Individual
European Championships
Gold medal – first place	2004 Brussels	Team
Silver medal – second place	2006 Athens	Team
European Indoor Championships
Gold medal – first place	2008 Turin	Individual
Gold medal – first place	2010 Poreč	Individual
Silver medal – second place	2006 Jaén	Team
Silver medal – second place	2008 Turin	Team
Silver medal – second place	2011 Cambrils	Team
Universiade
Silver medal – second place	2009 Belgrade	Team
Silver medal – second place	2011 Shenzhen	Team
Bronze medal – third place	2003 Daegu	Team
- Updated on 1 August 2015

Tetyana Mykolayivna Dorokhova (Ukrainian: Тетяна Миколаївна Дорохова) is a Ukrainian archer who competed at the 2012 Summer Olympics in the women's team event, and the women's individual event. She won the silver medal at the 2011 Archery European Indoor Championships in the women's team event.
