= 2016 World Indoor Archery Championships =

International archery competition

2016 World Indoor Target Archery Championships
- Location: Ankara, Turkey
- Start date: 2016-03-01
- End date: 2016-03-06

The 2016 World Indoor Target Archery Championships was the 13th edition of the World Indoor Archery Championships. The event was held in Ankara, Turkey, from 1 to 6 March 2016, and was organized by World Archery.

== Events ==
=== Recurve ===
==== Senior ====
Event	Gold	Silver	Bronze
Men's individual	Heorhiy Ivanytskyy; Ukraine	Sergii Makarevych; Ukraine	Brady Ellison; United States
Men's team	Germany; Florian Floto; Florian Kahllund; Carlo Schmitz	France; Florent Mulot; Olivier Tavernier; Thomas Antoine	Russia; Bair Tsybekdorzhiev; Alexander Kozhin; Arsalan Baldanov
Women's individual	Lisa Unruh; Germany	Natalia Lesniak; Poland	Claudia Mandia; Italy
Women's team	Japan; Sugimoto Tomomi; Kawanaka Kaori; Sugibayashi Rina	Poland; Natalia Lesniak; Karina Lipiarska; Wioleta Myszor	Georgia; Yulia Lobzhenidze; Kristine Esebua; Khatuna Narimanidze

==== Junior ====
Event	Gold	Silver	Bronze
Men's individual	David Pasqualucci; Italy	Dan Olaru; Moldova	Rok Bizjak; Slovenia
Men's team	Italy; David Pasqualucci; Dino Bizzotto; Yuri Belli	Turkey; Mete Gazoz; Onur Tezel; Oğuzhan Küçük	Russia; Buianto Tsyrendorzhiev; Aldar Gombozhapov; Tsyren Baltakov
Women's individual	Su Szu-Ping; Chinese Taipei	Tatiana Andreoli; Italy	Chang Rong-Jia; Chinese Taipei
Women's team	Italy; Tatiana Andreoli; Loredana Spera; Tanya Giaccheri	Chinese Taipei; Chang Rong-Jia; Yeh Yu-Chen; Su Szu-Ping	Russia; Tuiana Dashidorzhieva; Rozalina Timofeeva; Balzhin Dorzhieva

=== Compound ===
==== Senior ====
Event	Gold	Silver	Bronze
Men's individual	Sebastien Peineau; France	Mike Schloesser; Netherlands	Omid Taheri; Iran
Men's team	Italy; Sergio Pagni; Luigi Dragoni; Michele Nencioni	Denmark; Patrick Laursen; Stephan Hansen; Martin Damsbo	France; Sebastien Peineau; Jean Philippe Boulch; Fabien Delobelle
Women's individual	Irene Franchini; Italy	Albina Loginova; Russia	Sarah Prieels; Belgium
Women's team	Denmark; Tanja Jensen; Erika Anear; Sarah Holst Sonnichsen	Russia; Maria Vinogradova; Natalia Avdeeva; Albina Loginova	Italy; Irene Franchini; Laura Longo; Eleonora Sarti

==== Junior ====
Event	Gold	Silver	Bronze	
Men's individual	Viktor Orosz; Hungary	Christos Aerikos; Greece	Anton Bulaev; Russia	[
Men's team	Russia; Anton Bulaev; Dmitriy Stepanov; Boris Chizhov	Italy; Jesse Sut; Manuel Festi; Viviano Mior	Australia; Remy Leonard; Harri Howden; DeVilliers Duvenage	
Women's individual	Lucia Valeria Chavarria; Mexico	Cassidy Cox; United States	Athena Caiopoulos; United States	
Women's team	Turkey; Gizem Elmaağaçlı; Evrim Sağlam; Nevin Akdağ	Russia; Alexandra Savenkova; Sofia Fadeeva; Diana Ravilova	Italy; Giulia Grascelli; Aurora Tozzi; Camilla Alberti	

=== Medal table ===
Rank	Nation	Gold	Silver	Bronze	Total
1	Italy (ITA)	5	2	3	10
2	Germany (GER)	2	0	0	2
3	Russia (RUS)	1	3	4	8
4	Chinese Taipei (TPE)	1	1	1	3
4	France (FRA)	1	1	1	3
6	Denmark (DEN)	1	1	0	2
6	Turkey (TUR)	1	1	0	2
6	Ukraine (UKR)	1	1	0	2
9	Hungary (HUN)	1	0	0	1
9	Japan (JPN)	1	0	0	1
9	Mexico (MEX)	1	0	0	1
12	Poland (POL)	0	2	0	2
13	United States (USA)	0	1	2	3
14	Greece (GRE)	0	1	0	1
14	Moldova (MDA)	0	1	0	1
14	Netherlands (NED)	0	1	0	1
17	Australia (AUS)	0	0	1	1
17	Belgium (BEL)	0	0	1	1
17	Georgia (GEO)	0	0	1	1
17	Iran (IRI)	0	0	1	1
17	Slovenia (SLO)	0	0	1	1
Totals (21 entries)		16	16	16	48

== Participating nations ==
34 nations registered 262 athletes across disciplines, 11 fewer country and 91 athletes fewer than in Nîmes in 2014.

- Australia (9)
- Belarus (8)
- Belgium (1)
- Bulgaria (3)
- Chinese Taipei (6)
- Croatia (4)
- Denmark (9)
- Estonia (2)
- France (17)
- Georgia (12)
- Germany (10)
- Great Britain (1)
- Greece (3)
- Hungary (1)
- Iceland (2)
- Iraq (1)
- Iran (15)
- Italy (24)
- Japan (7)
- Lithuania (1)
- Mexico (5)
- Moldova (2)
- Netherlands (3)
- Norway (3)
- Poland (11)
- Romania (1)
- Russia (24)
- Saudi Arabia (2)
- Slovakia (1)
- Slovenia (7)
- Switzerland (4)
- Turkey (24)
- Ukraine (19)
- United States 20)
