= Archery at the 2005 Summer Universiade =

The Archery competition in the 2005 Summer Universiade were held in İzmir, Turkey.

== Medal overview ==
=== Men's events ===
Event	Gold	Silver	Bronze
Individual Recurve	Kuo Cheng-wei (TPE)	Hong Sung-Chil (KOR)	Choi Young-Kwang (KOR)
Team Recurve	Ukraine (UKR); Dmytro Hrachov; Viktor Ruban; Oleksandr Serdyuk	South Korea (KOR); Choi Young-Kwang; Hong Sung-Chil; Im Dong-hyun	Russia (RUS); Andrey Abramov; Evgeny Rygzenov; Ilya Sidorin
Individual Compound	Sergio Pagni (ITA)	Florian Faucheur (FRA)	Daniele Bauro (ITA)
Team Compound	South Korea (KOR); Choi Young-Hee; Jeong Eui-Soo; Shin Hyun-Gyu	United States (USA); Braden Gellenthien; Jedd Greshock; Logan Wilde	Mexico (MEX); Ernesto Lugo; Eduardo Monroy; Ernesto Ochoa

=== Women's events ===
Event	Gold	Silver	Bronze
Individual Recurve	Lee Sung-Jin (KOR)	Kateryna Palekha (UKR)	Viktoriya Koval (UKR)
Team Recurve	South Korea (KOR); Kim Mun-Joung; Lee Sung-Jin; Yun Mi-jin	Ukraine (UKR); Tetyana Berezhna; Viktoriya Koval; Kateryna Palekha	Poland (POL); Justyna Mospinek; Wioleta Myszor; Anna Szukalska
Individual Compound	Amandine Bouillot (FRA)	Kim Hyo-Sun (KOR)	Arminda Bastos (MEX)
Team Compound	South Korea (KOR); Choi Mi-Yeon; Kim Hyo-Sun; Lee A-Young	Russia (RUS); Sofya Goncharova; Svetlana Kondrashenko; Natalia Shiriaeva	Turkey (TUR); Neşe Alptekin; Gamze Uçar; Sevinç Uysal

== Medal table ==
Rank	Nation	Gold	Silver	Bronze	Total
1	South Korea (KOR)	4	3	1	8
2	Ukraine (UKR)	1	2	1	4
3	France (FRA)	1	1	0	2
4	Italy (ITA)	1	0	1	2
5	Chinese Taipei (TPE)	1	0	0	1
6	Russia (RUS)	0	1	1	2
7	United States (USA)	0	1	0	1
8	Mexico (MEX)	0	0	2	2
9	Poland (POL)	0	0	1	1
9	Turkey (TUR)	0	0	1	1
Totals (10 entries)		8	8	8	24
