= Archery at the 2009 Summer Universiade =

The Archery competition in the 2009 Summer Universiade were held in Belgrade, Serbia.

== Medal overview ==
=== Men's events ===
Event	Gold	Silver	Bronze
Individual Recurve	Viktor Ruban (UKR)	Wang Cheng-pang (TPE)	Dmytro Hrachov (UKR)
Team Recurve	South Korea (KOR); Kim Seong Hoon; Park Hee Jae; Kim Jaehyeong	Chinese Taipei (TPE); Wang Cheng-pang; Kuo Cheng-Wei; Sung Chia-Chun	Italy (ITA); Massimiliano Mandia; Amedeo Tonelli; Matteo Fissore
Individual Compound	Steven Gatto (USA)	Federico Pettenazzo (ITA)	Danzan Khaludorov (RUS)
Team Compound	United States (USA); Stephen Schwade; Zachary Plannick; Steven Gatto	Mexico (MEX); Eduardo Villasenor; Gerardo Alvarado; Hafid Jaime	Russia (RUS); Anton Khlyshchenko; Denis Segin; Danzan Khaludorov

=== Women's events ===
Event	Gold	Silver	Bronze
Individual Recurve	Kim Yeseul (KOR)	Kim Yumi (KOR)	Gema Buitron Cortinas (ESP)
Team Recurve	South Korea (KOR); Chang Hyejin; Kim Yumi; Kim Yeseul	Ukraine (UKR); Tetyana Dorokhova; Viktoriya Koval; Olena Kushniruk	China (CHN); Jialing Qian; Dan Guo; Ling Chen
Individual Compound	Seok Jihyun (KOR)	Victoria Balzhanova (RUS)	Erika Anschutz (USA)
Team Compound	Chinese Taipei (TPE); Chen Li Ju; Wen Yu-Chun; Lin Chia-Ying	Russia (RUS); Natalia Avdeeva; Victoria Balzhanova; Albina Loginova	South Korea (KOR); Seo Jung Hee; Kwon Ohhyang; Seok Jihyun

=== Mixed events ===
Event	Gold	Silver	Bronze
Mixed Team Recurve	South Korea (KOR); Kim Seong Hoon; Kim Yeseul	Ukraine (UKR); Dmytro Hrachov; Viktoriya Koval	Poland (POL); Justyna Mospinek; Rafał Dobrowolski
Mixed Team Compound	Russia (RUS); Danzan Khaludorov; Albina Loginova	United States (USA); Steven Gatto; Erika Anschutz	South Korea (KOR); Kim Dong Gyu; Seok Jihyun

== Medal table ==
Rank	Nation	Gold	Silver	Bronze	Total
1	South Korea (KOR)	5	1	2	8
2	United States (USA)	2	1	1	4
3	Russia (RUS)	1	2	2	5
4	Ukraine (UKR)	1	2	1	4
5	Chinese Taipei (TPE)	1	2	0	3
6	Italy (ITA)	0	1	1	2
7	Mexico (MEX)	0	1	0	1
8	China (CHN)	0	0	1	1
8	Poland (POL)	0	0	1	1
8	Spain (ESP)	0	0	1	1
Totals (10 entries)		10	10	10	30
