= Ivan Kozhokar =

Ukrainian archer (born 2000)

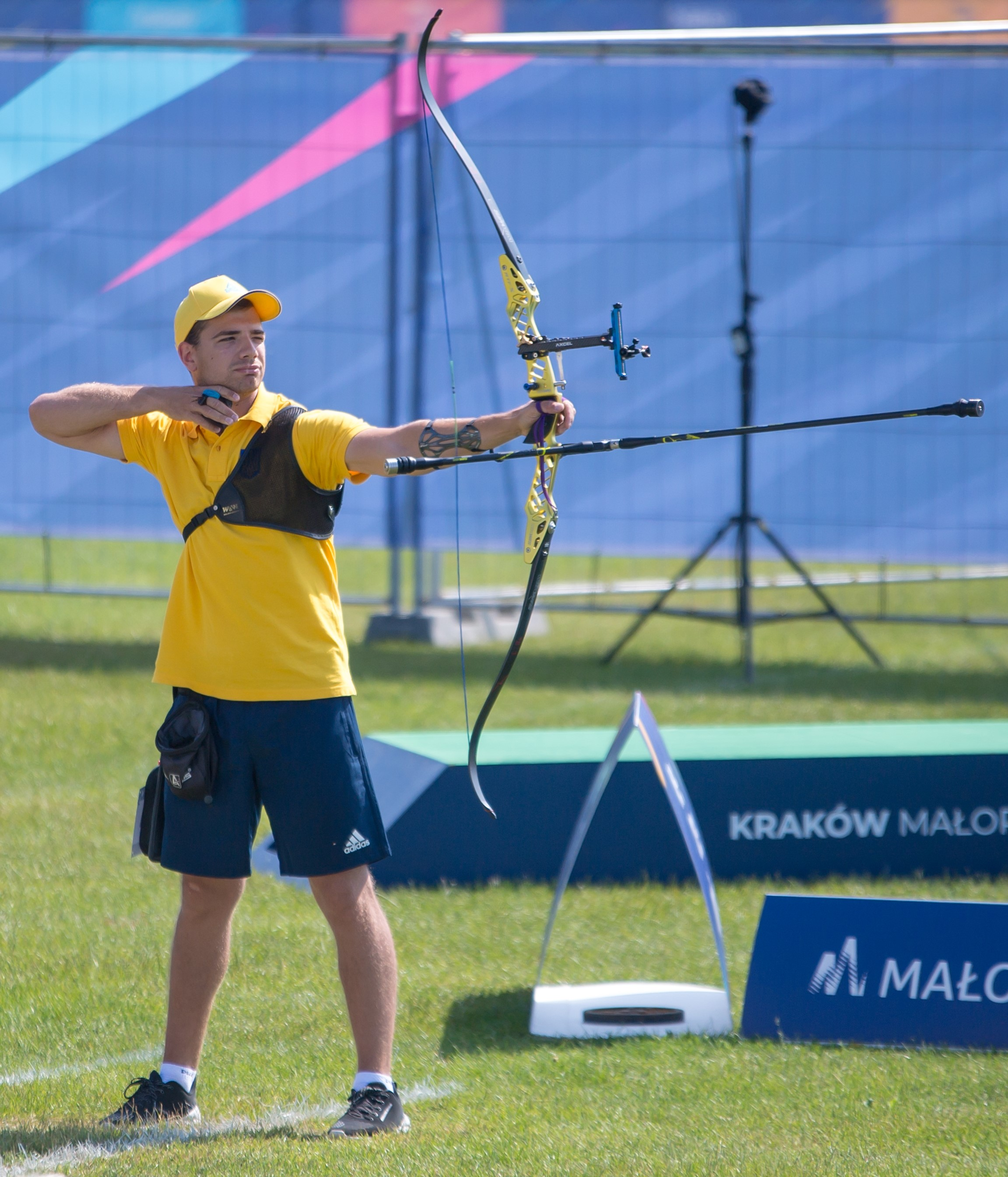
- Ivan Kozhokar at the 2023 European Games

Personal information
- Born: 10 January 2000 (age 26) Chernivtsi, Ukraine

Sport
- Country: Ukraine
- Sport: Archery
- Event: Recurve
Medal record
Men's archery
European Games
Silver medal – second place	2023 Kraków-Małopolska	Mixed team
European Archery Championships
Silver medal – second place	2021 Antalya	Team
European Indoor Championships
Gold medal – first place	2024 Varaždin	Team
Bronze medal – third place	2026 Plovdiv	Team
World Junior Indoor Championships
Gold medal – first place	2018 Yankton	Junior individual
Silver medal – second place	2018 Yankton	Junior team
European Junior Indoor Championships
Gold medal – first place	2019 Samsun	Junior individual

Ivan Kozhokar (Ukrainian: Іван Кожокар; born 10 January 2000 in Chernivtsi) is a Ukrainian archer.

== Career ==
He is silver medallist of the 2023 European Games and of the 2021 European Championships. He represented Ukraine at the 2019 Summer Universiade competing in both individual (where he lost in the round of 32 to the eventual silver medallist) and team event (where he competed together with Artem Ovchynnikov and they lost to the US team in the round of 16). He also tried to qualify for the 2020 Summer Olympics but he lost in the round of 32 of the qualification tournament.
