= Eleni Ioannou =

Greek judoka (1984–2004)

Personal information
- Born: 13 January 1984
- Died: 24 August 2004 (aged 20)
- Occupation: Judoka

Sport
- Sport: Judo

Profile at external databases
- JudoInside.com: 13448

Eleni Ioannou (13 January 1984 – 24 August 2004) was a member of the Greek judo team. She was due to compete at the 2004 Summer Olympics.

== Career ==
Eleni won three national championships in Greece. She also won a bronze medal in the Balkan Junior Championships held in Komotini in August 2002.

== Personal life ==
On 7 August 2004 she jumped from a third floor balcony of an apartment building, then spent the next 17 days in critical condition until she died. The suicide incident occurred shortly after an episode with Eleni's boyfriend, Giorgos Chrisostomides. On August 9, he jumped from the same balcony, but recovered from his injuries.
