= Archery at the 2003 Summer Universiade =

The Archery competition in the 2003 Summer Universiade were held in Daegu, South Korea.This was the first time that the sport was part of the Games'program, as part of the optional along judo and taekwondo.

== Medal overview ==
=== Men's events ===
Event	Gold	Silver	Bronze
Individual recurve	Bang Jea-Hwan (KOR)	Lee Chang-Hwan (KOR)	Oleksandr Serdyuk (UKR)
Team recurve	France (FRA); Willy Ardiet; Aurelien Daux; Antoine Friet	South Korea (KOR); Bang Jea-Hwan; Lee Chang-Hwan; Jung Jong-Sang	China (CHN); Wu Fengbo; Li Zhiyong; Li Xun
Individual compound	Daniele Bauro (ITA)	Jo Young-Joon (KOR)	Drew Lasher (USA)
Team compound	South Korea (KOR); Jo Young-Joon; Jeong Eui-Soo; Choi Young-Hee	Netherlands (NED); Lucas Schoormans; Mark Poels; Maryn Schoormans	United States (USA); Joshua Binger; Drew Lasher; Cassidy Miller

=== Women's events ===
Event	Gold	Silver	Bronze
Individual recurve	Park Sung-hyun (KOR)	Yun Mi-Jin (KOR)	Lee Hyun-Jung (KOR)
Team recurve	South Korea (KOR); Park Sung-hyun; Lee Hyun-Jung; Yun Mi-Jin	China (CHN); Lin Sang; Xu Linlin; Tao Lin	Ukraine (UKR); Kateryna Palekha; Tetyana Berezhna; Tetyana Dorokhova
Individual compound	Choi Mi-Yeon (KOR)	Mary Zorn (USA)	Sofia Goncharova (RUS)
Team compound	United States (USA); Mary Zorn; Amber Dawson; Megan Bowker	South Korea (KOR); Choi Mi-Yeon; Lee Hye-Yean; Park Jin-Young	Italy (ITA); Serena Pisano; Eva Ansaloni; Fiammetta Scarzella

== Medal table ==
Rank	Nation	Gold	Silver	Bronze	Total
1	South Korea (KOR)	5	5	1	11
2	United States (USA)	1	1	2	4
3	Italy (ITA)	1	0	1	2
4	France (FRA)	1	0	0	1
5	China (CHN)	0	1	1	2
6	Netherlands (NED)	0	1	0	1
7	Ukraine (UKR)	0	0	2	2
8	Russia (RUS)	0	0	1	1
Totals (8 entries)		8	8	8	24
