= Şirinyer Racecourse =

Horse racing venue in İzmir, Turkey

Şirinyer Racecourse Şirinyer Hipodromu
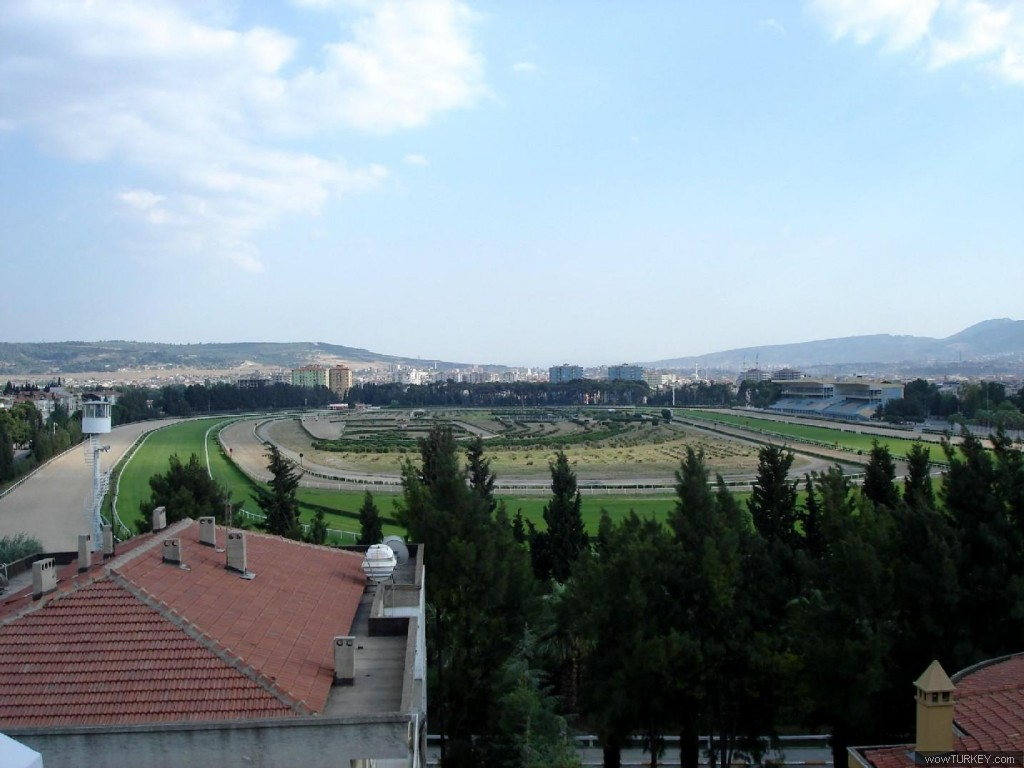
- Interactive map of Şirinyer Racecourse; Şirinyer Hipodromu
- Location: Buca, İzmir, Turkey
- Coordinates: 38.384444°N 27.150278°E
- Owned by: Jockey Club of Turkey (TJK)
- Date opened: September 23, 1856; 169 years ago
- Screened on: TJK TV
- Course type: Flat/Thoroughbred

Şirinyer Racecourse (Turkish: Şirinyer Hipodromu) is a horse racing track located at Şirinyer neighborhood in Buca district of İzmir, Turkey.

It is the country's oldest racecourse founded in 1856. The first-ever horse race in Turkey was held in Şirinyer Racecourse on September 23, 1856.

The racecourse covers an area of 47.9 ha (118 acres) consisting of facilities for racing, training and barns. The racecourse hosts night races since 2007, the first venue in Turkey to do so. The racecourse was renovated in 2000 and 2015.
