= Archery at the 2011 Summer Universiade =

Archery will be contested at the 2011 Summer Universiade from August 14 to August 18 at Football Pitch One and Football Pitch Two of Shenwanyi Road in Shenzhen, China. Men's and women's individual and men's, women's, and mixed team events will be held using the recurve bow and the compound bow, with one set of events for each type of bow.

== Medal summary ==
=== Medal table ===
Rank	Nation	Gold	Silver	Bronze	Total
1	South Korea (KOR)	6	3	1	10
2	Russia (RUS)	2	1	1	4
3	France (FRA)	1	0	2	3
4	China (CHN)	1	0	0	1
5	United States (USA)	0	2	1	3
6	Chinese Taipei (TPE)	0	1	2	3
7	Ukraine (UKR)	0	1	1	2
8	Japan (JPN)	0	1	0	1
8	Mexico (MEX)	0	1	0	1
10	India (IND)	0	0	1	1
10	Italy (ITA)	0	0	1	1
Totals (11 entries)		10	10	10	30

=== Events ===
==== Men's events ====
Event	Gold	Silver	Bronze
Recurve individual	Im Dong-Hyun; South Korea	Kim Woo-Jin; South Korea	Kim Bubmin; South Korea
Compound individual	Alexander Dambaev; Russia	Choi Yong-Hee; South Korea	Sebastien Brasseur; France
Recurve team	China (CHN); Chang Liang; Liu Zhaowu; Ren Jinke	Japan (JPN); Shohei Ota; Hiroki Suetake; Hiroyuki Yoshinaga	France (FRA); Thomas Aubert; Geoffrey Barthelot; Thomas Faucheron
Compound team	France (FRA); Sebastien Brasseur; Joanna Chesse; Pascale Lebecque	Mexico (MEX); Gerardo Alvarado; Angel Ramirez; Cuauhtemoc Alfredo Rodríguez	United States (USA); Adam Gallant; Zachary Plannick; Adam Wruck

==== Women's events ====
Event	Gold	Silver	Bronze
Recurve individual	Ki Bo-Bae; South Korea	Jung Da-Somi; South Korea	Cho Peichin; Chinese Taipei
Compound individual	Polina Nikitina; Russia	Kendal Nicely; United States	Viktoria Balzhanova; Russia
Recurve team	South Korea (KOR); Han Gyeong-Hee; Jung Da-Somi; Ki Bo-Bae	Ukraine (UKR); Tetyana Dorokhova; Olena Kushniruk; Nina Mylchenko	Chinese Taipei (TPE); Cho Peichin; Le Chien-ying; Yuan Shu-chi
Compound team	South Korea (KOR); Kim Hyo Sun; Seo Jung Hee; Seok Ji-Hyun	Russia (RUS); Natalia Avdeeva; Viktoria Balzhanova; Polina Nikitina	India (IND); Gagandeep Kaur; Anjali Kumari; Sunita Rani

==== Mixed events ====
Event	Gold	Silver	Bronze
Recurve team	South Korea (KOR); Ki Bo-Bae; Kim Bubmin	Chinese Taipei (TPE); Tien Kang; Yuan Shu-chi	Ukraine (UKR); Dmytro Hrachov; Nina Mylchenko
Compound team	South Korea (KOR); Min Lihong; Seo Jung Hee	United States (USA); Kendal Nicely; Zachary Plannick	Italy (ITA); Anastasia Anastasio; Jacopo Polidori
