= 1991 World Indoor Archery Championships =

1991 World Indoor Target Archery Championships
- Location: Oulu, Finland

The 1991 World Indoor Target Archery Championships were held in Oulu, Finland. It was the first ever World Indoor Championship.

== Medal summary (Men's individual) ==
Event	Gold	Silver	Bronze
Freestyle Men's individual	(France) Sebastian Flute	(United States) Jay Barrs	(Soviet Union) Vadim Chikarev
Compound Men's individual	(United States) Joe Asay	(United States) Dan Kolb	(United States) James Fowles

== Medal summary (Women's individual) ==
Event	Gold	Silver	Bronze
Freestyle Women's individual	(Soviet Union) Natalia Valeeva	(Taiwan) Chin Chiu-Yueh	(France) Severine Bonal
Compound Women's individual	(Italy) Lucia Panico	(Finland) Kirsi Rantanen	(United States) Glenda Doran

== Notes ==
The Freestyle event would change its name to the Recurve event at later championships.
