= 1993 World Indoor Archery Championships =

1993 World Indoor Target Archery Championships
- Location: Perpignan, France

The 1993 World Indoor Target Archery Championships were held in Perpignan, France.

== Medal summary (Men's individual) ==
| Event | Gold | Silver | Bronze |
|---|---|---|---|
| Freestyle Men's individual | (Russia) Gennady Mitrofanov | (Taiwan) Tsung Wu | (Belarus) Stanislav Zabrodsky |
| Compound Men's individual | (United States) Kirk Ethridge | (Denmark) Paw Lassew | (United States) Dee Wilde |

== Medal summary (Women's individual) ==
| Event | Gold | Silver | Bronze |
|---|---|---|---|
| Recurve Women's individual | (United States) Jennifer O'Donnell | (Moldova) Natalia Valeeva | (Belarus) Olga Yakuocheva |
| Compound Women's individual | (United States) Inga Low | (United States) Glenda Doran | (France) Hélène Joinier |
