= Hong Sung-chil =

South Korean archer (born 1980)

Medal record
Men's archery
Representing South Korea
World Championships
Gold medal – first place	1999 Riom	Individual
Silver medal – second place	1999 Riom	Team
Summer Universiade
Silver medal – second place	2005 Izmir	Individual
Silver medal – second place	2005 Izmir	Team

Hong Sung-chil (Korean: 홍성칠; born October 24, 1980) is a South Korean archer who won the 1999 World Championships in Riom, France.

He is doing head coach of Iran national team now.
