= Dmytro Hrachov =

Ukrainian archer (born 1983)

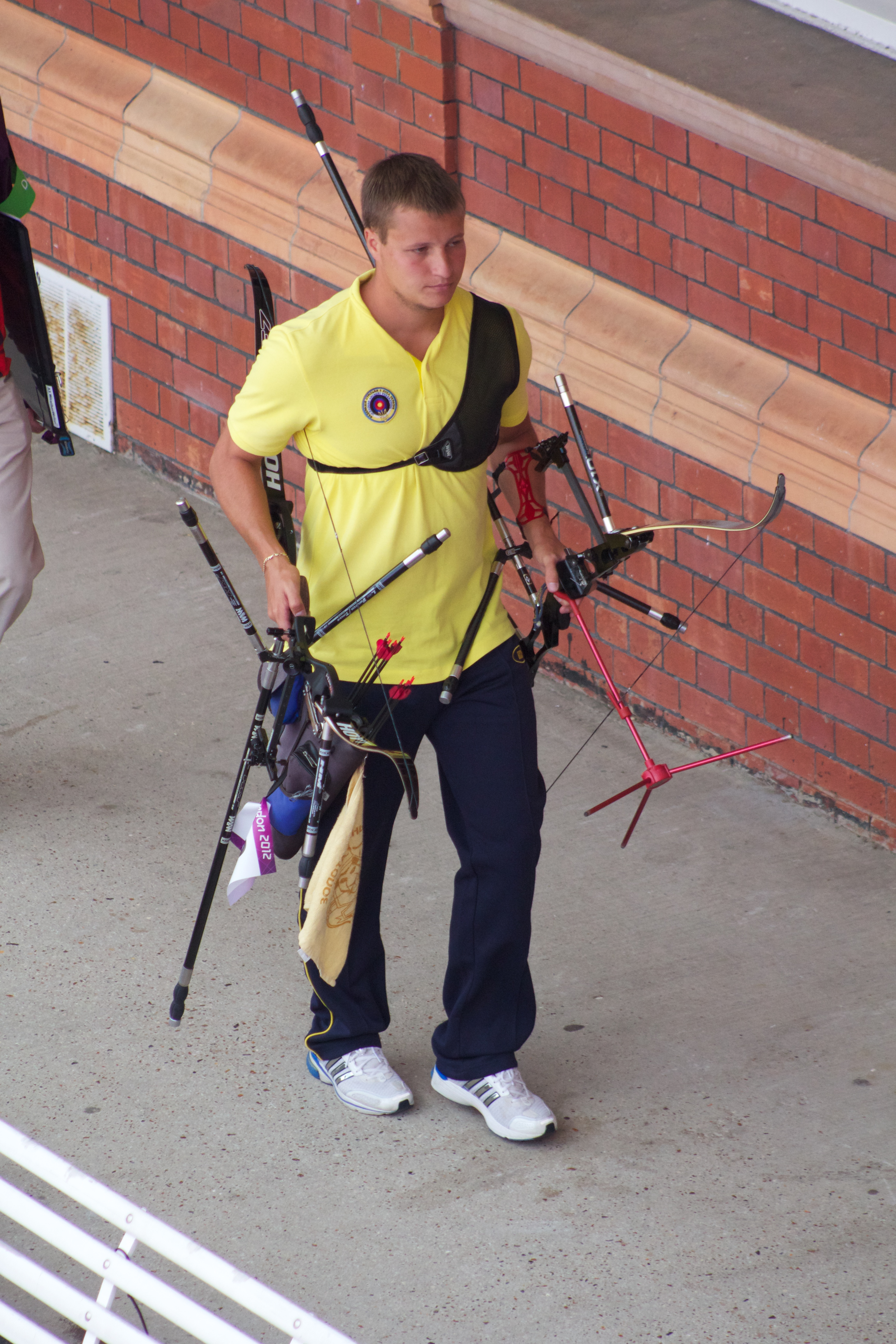

Medal record

Men's archery

Olympic Games
| Bronze medal – third place | Athens 2004 | Team |

European Archery Championships
| Bronze medal – third place | 2012 Amsterdam | Team |

Universiade
| Gold medal – first place | 2005 Izmir | Team recurve |
| Silver medal – second place | 2009 Belgrade | Mixed team recurve |
| Bronze medal – third place | 2011 Shenzhen | Mixed team recurve |
| Bronze medal – third place | 2009 Belgrade | Individual recurve |

Dmytro Olehovych Hrachov (Ukrainian: Дмитро Олегович Грачов; born 5 December 1983) is an athlete from Ukraine that competes in archery.

Hrachov competed at the 2004 Summer Olympics in men's individual archery. He won his first match, advancing to the round of 32. In the second round of elimination, he was defeated. His final rank was 24th overall. Hrachov was also a member of the bronze medal Ukrainian men's archery team at the 2004 Summer Olympics.
