= Viktoriya Koval =

Ukrainian archer (born 1985)

Olympic medal record

Women's Archery

Representing Ukraine

World Indoor Championships
Bronze medal – third place	2007 Izmir	Team

European Indoor Championships
Gold medal – first place	2010 Poreč	Team
Gold medal – first place	2013 Rzeszów	Team
Silver medal – second place	2006 Jaén	Team
Silver medal – second place	2011 Cambrils	Team

Universiade
Silver medal – second place	2005 Izmir	Team
Silver medal – second place	2009 Belgrade	Team
Silver medal – second place	2009 Belgrade	Mixed team
Bronze medal – third place	2005 Izmir	Individual

Viktoriya Oleksandrivna Koval (Ukrainian: Вікторія Олександрівна Коваль; born June 11, 1985) is an athlete from Ukraine who competes in archery.

== 2008 Summer Olympics ==
At the 2008 Summer Olympics in Beijing Koval finished her ranking round with a total of 641 points. This gave her the 21st seed for the final competition bracket in which she faced Barbora Horáčková in the first round, beating the archer from the Czech Republic with 109–107. In the second round she was eliminated by 12th seed Aida Román with 111–105.
