= Cassidy Cox =

American archer (born 1998)

Personal information
- Born: June 18, 1998 (age 28)

Sport
- Country: United States
- Sport: Archery
- Event: Compound
Medal record
Women's compound archery
Representing United States
World Championships
Silver medal – second place	2019 's-Hertogenbosch	Team
World Cup
Gold medal – first place	2019 Antalya	Team
Gold medal – first place	2023 Antalya	Team
Bronze medal – third place	2019 Berlin	Team
World Games
Bronze medal – third place	2017 Wrocław	Mixed team
Pan American Championships
Bronze medal – third place	2018 Medellín	Team
Bronze medal – third place	2022 Santiago	Team

Cassidy Cox (born June 18, 1998) is an American archer competing in women's compound events. She won the silver medal in the women's team compound event at the 2019 World Archery Championships held in 's-Hertogenbosch, Netherlands.

In 2017, Cox and Kris Schaff won the bronze medal in the mixed team compound event at the World Games held in Wrocław, Poland. Cox won two gold medals at the 2018 World Indoor Archery Championships held in Yankton, United States. She won the gold medal in the junior women's individual compound event and in the junior women's team compound event, alongside Athena Caiopoulos and Anna Scarbrough.

In 2020, she finished in 10th place in the women's compound event at The Vegas Shoot held in Las Vegas, United States.

Cox, Alexis Ruiz, Paige Pearce won the bronze medal in the women's team compound event at the 2022 Pan American Archery Championships held in Santiago, Chile.
