= Kateryna Palekha =

Ukrainian archer (born 1980)

Olympic medal record

Women's Archery

Representing Ukraine

World Championships
Silver medal – second place	2005 Madrid	Team
Bronze medal – third place	2001 Beijing	Individual

World Indoor Championships
Bronze medal – third place	2001 Florence	Team

European Championships
Gold medal – first place	2004 Brussels	Team
Bronze medal – third place	2002 Oulu	Team

European Indoor Championships
Gold medal – first place	1998 Oldenburg	Team
Gold medal – first place	2002 Ankara	Team
Gold medal – first place	2013 Rzeszów	Team
Silver medal – second place	2000 Spała	Individual
Silver medal – second place	2006 Jaén	Team
Silver medal – second place	2008 Turin	Team

Universiade
Silver medal – second place	2005 İzmir	Individual
Silver medal – second place	2005 İzmir	Team
Bronze medal – third place	2003 Daegu	Team

Kateryna Borysivna Palekha (Ukrainian: Катерина Борисівна Палеха; born 20 September 1980) is an athlete from Ukraine. She competes in archery.

Palekha represented Ukraine at the 2004 Summer Olympics and 2012 Summer Olympics.

At the 2004 Summer Olympics, She placed 59th in the women's individual ranking round with a 72-arrow score of 595. In the first round of elimination, she faced 6th-ranked Yuan Shu Chi of Chinese Taipei. Palekha lost 162–158 in the 18-arrow match, placing 33rd overall in women's individual archery.

Palekha was also a member of the 6th-place Ukrainian team in the women's team archery competition.

At the 2012 Summer Olympics, she lost to Miranda Leek in the last 64. The Ukrainian team that she was part of also lost in the first round, to the Japanese team.
