= Oleksandr Serdyuk =

Ukrainian archer (born 1978)

Olympic medal record

Men's Archery

Representing Ukraine

Olympic Games
Bronze medal – third place	2004 Athens	Team

Universiade
Gold medal – first place	2005 Izmir	Team
Bronze medal – third place	2003 Daegu	Individual

Oleksandr Oleksiyovych Serdyuk (Ukrainian: Олександр Олексійович Сердюк; born 3 July 1978) is an athlete from Ukraine. He competes in archery.

== 2004 Summer Olympics ==
Serdyuk competed at the 2004 Summer Olympics in men's individual archery. He won his first match, advancing to the round of 32. In the second round of elimination, he was again victorious and advanced to the round of 16. The third match was Serdyuk's downfall, as he lost to Hiroshi Yamamoto of Japan. Serdyuk placed 15th overall. Serdyuk was also a member of the bronze medal Ukrainian men's archery team at the 2004 Summer Olympics.

== 2008 Summer Olympics ==
At the 2008 Summer Olympics in Beijing, Serdyuk finished his ranking round with a total of 661 points, which gave him the 20th seed for the final competition bracket in which he faced Jens Pieper in the first round, beating the German 107-105. In the second round Serdyuk and his opponent Rafał Dobrowolski both scored 111 points in the regular match and had to go to an extra round. In this extra round Serdyuk scored 8 points, while Dobrowolski advanced to the third round with 9 points.

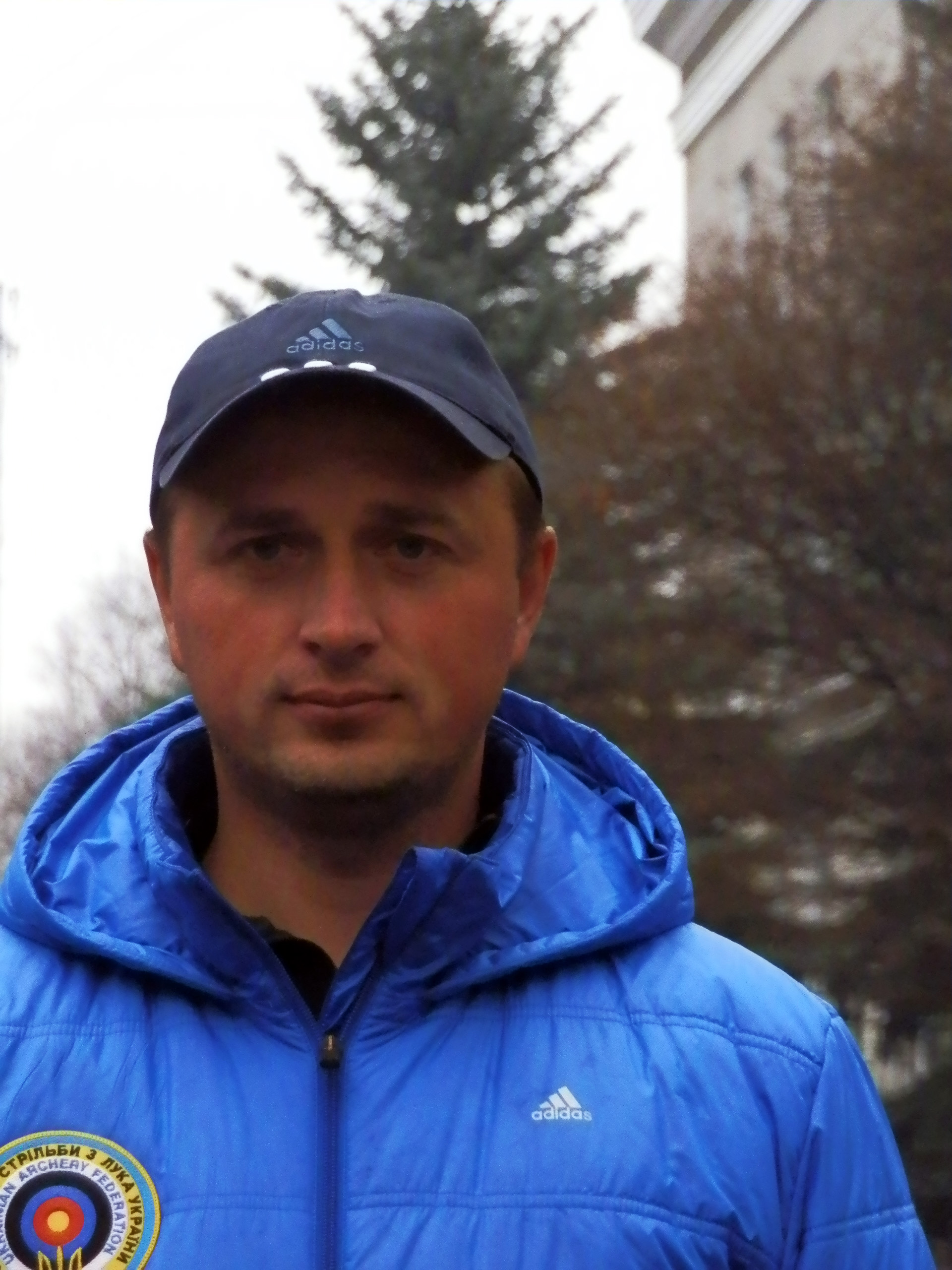
Oleksandr Serdyuk. Kharkiv. March 30, 2012

Together with Markiyan Ivashko and Viktor Ruban he also took part in the team event. With his 676 score from the ranking round combined with the 678 of Ruban and the 658 of Ivashko Ukraine was in second position after the ranking round, which gave them a straight seed into the quarter-finals. With 214–211 they were too strong for the Chinese Taipei team, but in the semi-final they were eliminated by Italy, 223–221. In the challenge for the bronze medal China was too strong with 222–219.
