= Natalia Avdeeva =

Russian compound archer (born 1988)

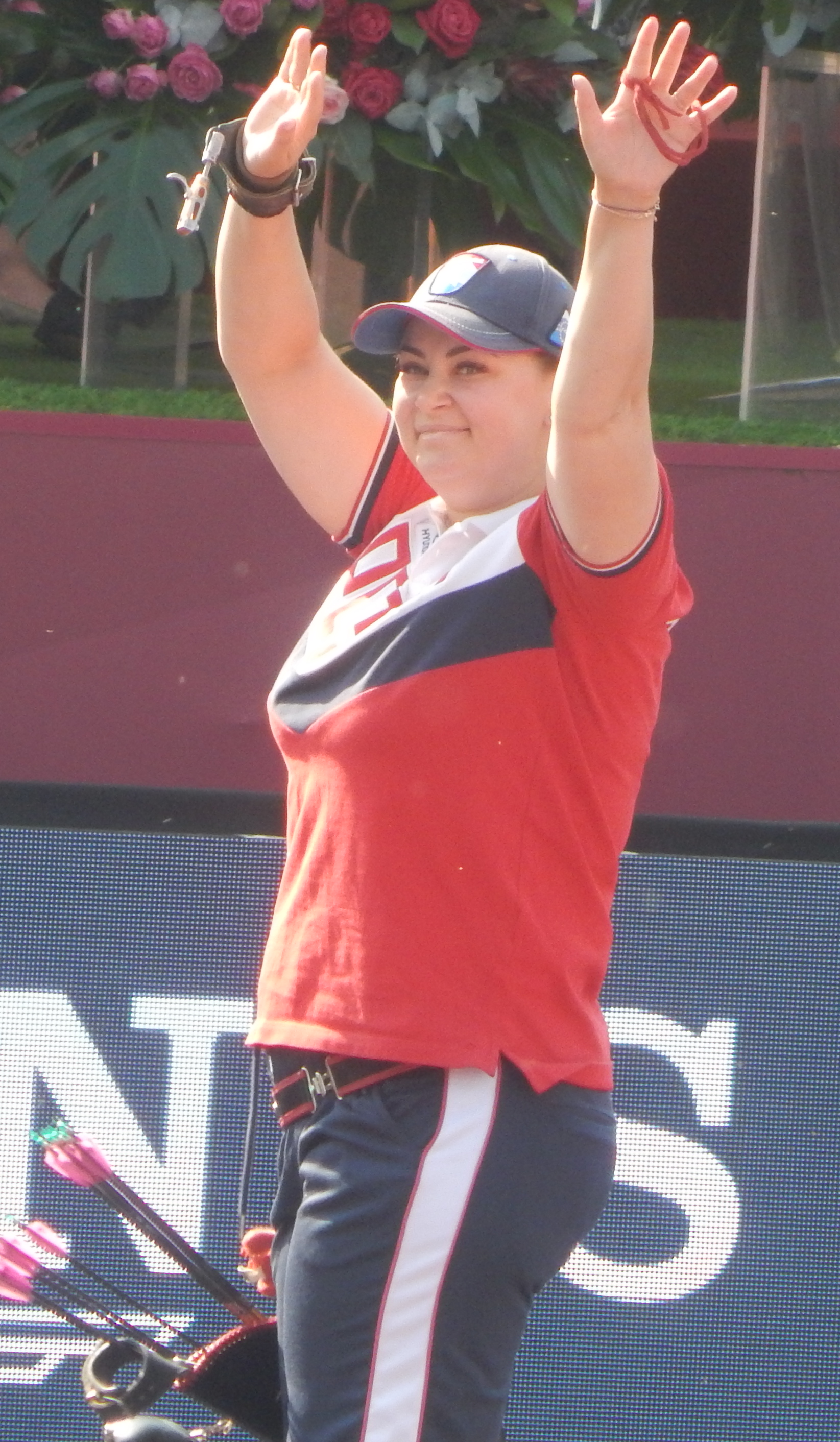
- Natalia Avdeeva in 2019.

Personal information
- Full name: Natalia Germanovna Avdeeva
- Born: 6 September 1988 (age 37) Kaliningrad, Russian SFSR

Sport
- Country: Russia
- Sport: Archery
- Event: compound
Medal record
Women's archery
Representing Russia
World Championships
| Gold medal – first place | 2019 's-Hertogenbosch | Individual |
European Games
| Gold medal – first place | 2019 Minsk | Mixed team |
| Silver medal – second place | 2019 Minsk | Individual |
Universiade
| Silver medal – second place | 2009 Belgrade | Team |
| Silver medal – second place | 2011 Shenzhen | Team |

Natalia Germanovna Avdeeva (Russian: Наталья Германовна Авдеева; born 6 September 1988) is a Russian compound archer. She won gold at the 2019 World Archery Championships and shortly thereafter a gold medal with Anton Bulaev at the 2019 European Games.
