= Viktoria Balzhanova =

Russian compound archer (born 1988)

Personal information
- Born: 11 May 1988 (age 38) Russia

Sport
- Country: Russia
- Sport: Archery
- Event: Recurve
Medal record
Universiade
Silver medal – second place	2011 Shenzhen	Team
Silver medal – second place	2009 Belgrade	Team
Silver medal – second place	2009 Belgrade	Individual
Bronze medal – third place	2011 Shenzhen	Individual
- Updated on 29 July 2023

Viktoria Balzhanova (born 11 May 1988) is a Russian compound archer. The highest ranking she has reached is the fourth position, which she reached for the last time in June 2011.

== Achievements ==
2008
4th, World University Championships, individual, Tainan
2009
(gold) World Cup, women's team, Poreč
(bronze) European Grand Prix, women's team, Sofia
(silver) Summer Universiade, individual, Belgrade
(silver) Summer Universiade, women's team, Belgrade
(gold) World Cup, women's team, Shanghai
(gold) World Outdoor Championships, women's team, Ulsan
43rd, World Outdoor Championships, individual, Ulsan
2010
(gold) World Cup, women's team, Poreč
(gold) European Outdoor Championships, individual, Rovereto
(bronze) European Outdoor Championships, women's team, Rovereto
(gold) World Cup, women's team, Antalya
(gold) World Cup, mixed team, Ogden, Utah
(silver) World Cup, women's team, Shanghai

2011
(silver) World Cup, individual, Poreč
(bronze) World Cup, women's team, Poreč
(gold) EMAU Grand Prix, women's team, Boé
(gold) EMAU Grand Prix, mixed team, Boé
(bronze) EMAU Grand Prix, individual, Boé
6th, World Outdoor Championships, women's team, Turin
33rd, World Outdoor Championships, individual, Turin
(silver) Summer Universiade, women's team, Shenzhen
(bronze) Summer Universiade, individual, Shenzhen
8th, Summer Universiade, mixed team, Shenzhen
(silver) World Cup, women's team, Shanghai
(gold) , European Outdoor Championships, women's team, Cambrils
2012
(gold) World Indoor Championships, individual, Las Vegas
(silver) World Indoor Championships, women's team, Las Vegas
4th, European Outdoor Championships, women's team, Amsterdam
9th, European Outdoor Championships, individual, Amsterdam
