= 2005 Summer Universiade =

Multi-sport event in İzmir, Turkey

XXIII Summer Universiade XXIII Yaz Üniversite Oyunları
- Slogan : World Unity on the Aegean Blue
- Host city: İzmir, Turkey
- Nations: 131
- Athletes: 5,346
- Events: 14 sports
- Opening: August 11, 2005
- Closing: August 22, 2005
- Opened by: Ahmet Necdet Sezer
- Main venue: İzmir Atatürk Stadium
- Website: fisu.net (archived)

The 2005 Summer Universiade, also known as the XXIII Summer Universiade, took place in İzmir, Turkey, in August.

== Emblem ==
The emblem is the letter "U", inspired by the bird's-eye view of the Gulf of İzmir. This shape has perfectly fit the letter "U" of Universiade, symbolizing its multi-cultural feature, while the smooth outline emphasizes the harmony and uniformity of the Universiade spirit.

== Mascot ==
Name: EFE

Efes are the leaders and heroes of societies that lived in Western Anatolia during the early 1900s. The village dandy Efe, guards and defends all the members of his society and also deals with much of their social work and events as if he is the father of all. For this reason, all the members of the society behave respectfully towards him with strong, emotional, family ties. The Efes were legends in these areas with their smart, fearless, alert dashing behaviors as brave and manly young fellows. They became the symbols of bravery, power and justice throughout the Aegean history.

Nowadays, the word "Efe" is the explanation of a man who is the symbol of justice. Therefore, we call successful athletes "Efe" stating their various qualifications in one brief word.

== Venues ==
- İzmir Streets — Athletics (Walking, Half-marathon)
- İzmir Atatürk Spor Salonu — Basketball, Volleyball
- Karşıyaka Arena — Basketball, Volleyball
- Halkapınar Spor Salonu — Gymnastics, Diving
- Şirinyer Hipodromu — Archery, Tennis
- Altay Alsancak Stadi — Football
- Sports Authority of İzmir — Shooting, Volleyball
- İzmir Atatürk Stadium — Athletics, Football
- Manisa Özel Yıdare Swimming Complex — Swimming
- İzmir University Sport Complex — Wrestling, Taekwondo, Fencing, Water Polo
- İzmir Port — Sailing

== Sports ==
=== Core Events ===
- Athletics ()
- Basketball ()
- Diving ()
- Fencing ()
- Football ()
- Gymnastics ()
- Swimming ()
- Tennis ()
- Volleyball ()
- Water polo ()

=== Optional Events ===
- Archery ()
- Sailing ()
- Taekwondo ()
- Wrestling ()

== Participants ==
- Albania
- Algeria
- Angola
- Armenia
- Australia
- Austria
- Azerbaijan
- Bangladesh
- Barbados
- Belarus
- Belgium
- Benin
- Bhutan
- Botswana
- Brazil
- Bulgaria
- Burkina Faso
- Burundi
- Canada
- Chad
- China
- Comoros
- Congo
- Costa Rica
- Colombia
- Côte d'Ivoire
- Croatia
- Cuba
- Cyprus
- Czech Republic
- Denmark
- Ecuador
- Egypt
- El Salvador
- Equatorial Guinea
- Estonia
- Ethiopia
- Fiji
- Finland
- France
- Georgia
- Germany
- Ghana
- Great Britain
- Greece
- Guinea
- Guinea-Bissau
- Haiti
- Honduras
- Hong Kong
- Hungary
- Iceland
- India
- Indonesia
- Iraq
- Ireland
- Iran
- Israel
- Italy
- Jamaica
- Japan
- Jordan
- Kenya
- North Korea
- South Korea
- Laos
- Latvia
- Lebanon
- Liberia
- Libya
- Lithuania
- Luxembourg
- Macau
- Madagascar
- Malawi
- Malaysia
- Malta
- Mauritania
- Mexico
- Federated States of Micronesia
- Moldova
- Mongolia
- Morocco
- Namibia
- Nepal
- Netherlands
- Netherlands Antilles
- New Zealand
- Nicaragua
- Niger
- Nigeria
- Norway
- Pakistan
- Palestine
- Panama
- Paraguay
- Peru
- Poland
- Portugal
- Puerto Rico
- Romania
- Russia
- Rwanda
- Saint Vincent and the Grenadines
- San Marino
- Senegal
- Serbia and Montenegro
- Singapore
- Slovakia
- Slovenia
- Somalia
- South Africa
- Spain
- Sri Lanka
- Sudan
- Suriname
- Swaziland
- Switzerland
- Sweden
- Chinese Taipei
- Tanzania
- Thailand
- Togo
- Turkey (host)
- Turkmenistan
- Uganda
- Ukraine
- United Arab Emirates
- United States
- Uruguay
- United States Virgin Islands
- Yemen
- Zambia
- Zimbabwe

== Medal table ==
* Host nation (Turkey)

Rank	Nation	Gold	Silver	Bronze	Total
1	Russia (RUS)	26	16	23	65
2	China (CHN)	21	16	12	49
3	Japan (JPN)	18	18	20	56
4	Ukraine (UKR)	18	16	18	52
5	United States (USA)	17	12	14	43
6	Poland (POL)	12	8	8	28
7	South Korea (KOR)	11	14	9	34
8	Turkey (TUR)*	10	11	6	27
9	Chinese Taipei (TPE)	6	2	4	12
10	Italy (ITA)	5	6	13	24
11	France (FRA)	5	3	7	15
12	Germany (GER)	4	5	8	17
13	Brazil (BRA)	4	2	9	15
14	Great Britain (GBR)	3	9	7	19
15	Belarus (BLR)	3	6	6	15
16	Canada (CAN)	3	6	3	12
17	Estonia (EST)	3	1	2	6
18	Uganda (UGA)	3	0	0	3
19	Iran (IRN)	2	6	4	12
20	Netherlands (NED)	2	1	2	5
21	Czech Republic (CZE)	2	0	2	4
22	Croatia (CRO)	2	0	0	2
23	Mexico (MEX)	1	5	7	13
24	North Korea (PRK)	1	3	2	6
25	New Zealand (NZL)	1	3	1	5
26	Kazakhstan (KAZ)	1	2	6	9
27	Hungary (HUN)	1	2	2	5
27	Serbia and Montenegro (SCG)	1	2	2	5
29	Cuba (CUB)	1	1	4	6
30	Spain (ESP)	1	1	2	4
31	Jamaica (JAM)	1	1	1	3
31	Thailand (THA)	1	1	1	3
33	Georgia (GEO)	1	0	3	4
34	South Africa (RSA)	1	0	2	3
35	Austria (AUT)	1	0	1	2
35	Romania (ROM)	1	0	1	2
37	Latvia (LAT)	1	0	0	1
37	Mongolia (MGL)	1	0	0	1
37	Slovenia (SLO)	1	0	0	1
40	Switzerland (SUI)	0	2	3	5
41	Portugal (POR)	0	2	0	2
42	Armenia (ARM)	0	1	4	5
42	Ireland (IRL)	0	1	4	5
44	Australia (AUS)	0	1	3	4
44	Greece (GRE)	0	1	3	4
44	Morocco (MAR)	0	1	3	4
47	Belgium (BEL)	0	1	2	3
47	Slovakia (SVK)	0	1	2	3
49	Finland (FIN)	0	1	1	2
49	Lithuania (LIT)	0	1	1	2
49	Senegal (SEN)	0	1	1	2
52	Algeria (ALG)	0	1	0	1
52	Egypt (EGY)	0	1	0	1
52	Moldova (MDA)	0	1	0	1
55	Azerbaijan (AZE)	0	0	2	2
55	Kenya (KEN)	0	0	2	2
57	Malaysia (MAS)	0	0	1	1
Totals (57 entries)		197	196	244	637
