= 2001 World Archery Championships – Men's individual recurve =

Individual recurve competition at the 2001 World Archery Championships

The men's individual recurve competition at the 2001 World Archery Championships took place in September 2001 in Beijing, China. 125 archers entered the competition. Following a qualifying 144 arrow FITA round, the top 64 archers qualified for the 6-round knockout tournament, drawn according to their qualification round scores. The semi-finals and finals then took place on 23 September.

== Qualifying ==
The following archers were the leading 8 qualifiers:

1. (Italy) Michele Frangilli (3rd round)
2. (South Korea) Yeon Jung-ki (Champion)
3. (South Korea) Lee Chang-hwan (2nd round)
4. (Italy) Ilario di Buo (4th place)
5. (Japan) Hiroshi Yamamoto (3rd round)
6. (South Korea) Park Kyung-mo (3rd place)
7. (Russia) Baljinima Tsyrempilov (Quarterfinal)
8. (Italy) Matteo Bisiani (2nd round)

== Full draw ==
=== Section 1 ===
1st round
1	(Italy) Michele Frangilli	166
64	(Belgium) Alain Autem	155
33	(Finland) Jari Lipponen	164
32	(Netherlands) Wietse van Alten	166
17	(Sweden) Magnus Petersson	163
48	(France) Jocelyn de Grandis	161
49	(France) Willy Ardiet	157
16	(France) Lionel Torres	174
9	(South Korea) Kim Won-sub	169
56	(Denmark) Niklas Eriksson	164
41	(Spain) Felipe López	159
24	(Denmark) Hasse Pavia Lind	161
25	(Italy) Mario Casavecchia	158
40	(Belarus) Anton Prilepau	165
57	(China) Ni Guobin	163
8	(Italy) Matteo Bisiani	166

2nd round
1	(Italy) Michele Frangilli	166
32	(Netherlands) Wietse van Alten	163
17	(Sweden) Magnus Petersson	163
16	(France) Lionel Torres	167
9	(South Korea) Kim Won-sub	161
24	(Denmark) Hasse Pavia Lind	161*
40	(Belarus) Anton Prilepau	167
8	(Italy) Matteo Bisiani	162

3rd round
1	(Italy) Michele Frangilli	165
16	(France) Lionel Torres	168
24	(Denmark) Hasse Pavia Lind	163
40	(Belarus) Anton Prilepau	165

Quarterfinal
16	(France) Lionel Torres	110
40	(Belarus) Anton Prilepau	108

=== Section 2 ===
1st round
5	(Japan) Hiroshi Yamamoto	166
60	(Moldova) Alexei Guzan	163
37	(Belgium) Christophe Peignois	154
28	(Australia) David Barnes	156
21	(United Kingdom) Simon Needham	160
44	(Belarus) Vladimir Dolgonosov	154
53	(China) Sun Jian	166
12	(Czech Republic) Daniel Kravacek	159
13	(Ukraine) Viktor Ruban	167
52	(Mongolia) Jantsan Gantugs	160
45	(Czech Republic) Pavel Jurak	161
20	(Ukraine) Oleksandr Serdyuk	162
29	(Australia) Michael Fisher	156
36	(Poland) Jacek Proć	165
61	(Mexico) Juan Carlos Manjarrez	159
4	(Italy) Ilario di Buo	165

2nd round
5	(Japan) Hiroshi Yamamoto	168
28	(Australia) David Barnes	159
21	(United Kingdom) Simon Needham	161*
53	(China) Sun Jian	161
13	(Ukraine) Viktor Ruban	160
20	(Ukraine) Oleksandr Serdyuk	172
36	(Poland) Jacek Proć	159
4	(Italy) Ilario di Buo	168

3rd round
5	(Japan) Hiroshi Yamamoto	164
21	(United Kingdom) Simon Needham	169
20	(Ukraine) Oleksandr Serdyuk	165
4	(Italy) Ilario di Buo	167

Quarterfinal
21	(United Kingdom) Simon Needham	102
4	(Italy) Ilario di Buo	110

=== Section 3 ===
1st round
3	(South Korea) Lee Chang-hwan	161
62	(France) Aurelien Daux	159
35	(Israel) Yaron Kolesnik	154
30	(Japan) Takayoshi Matsushita	167
19	(Belgium) Nico Hendrickx	162
46	(Denmark) Dennis Bager	164
51	(Chinese Taipei) Chen Szu-yuan	165*
14	(United Kingdom) Ian Crowther	165
11	(Germany) Erich Kloos	167
54	(Poland) Bartosz Mikos	158
43	(Czech Republic) Martin Bulir	162
22	(Ukraine) Igor Parkhomenko	163
27	(Russia) Gennady Metrofanov	163
38	(Chinese Taipei) Shih Cheng-te	162
59	(China) Yang Bo	164
6	(South Korea) Park Kyung-mo	164*

2nd round
3	(South Korea) Lee Chang-hwan	163
30	(Japan) Takayoshi Matsushita	164
46	(Denmark) Dennis Bager	160
51	(Chinese Taipei) Chen Szu-yuan	159
11	(Germany) Erich Kloos	163*
22	(Ukraine) Igor Parkhomenko	163
27	(Russia) Gennady Metrofanov	160
6	(South Korea) Park Kyung-mo	172

3rd round
30	(Japan) Takayoshi Matsushita	163
46	(Denmark) Dennis Bager	167
11	(Germany) Erich Kloos	165
6	(South Korea) Park Kyung-mo	167

Quarterfinal
46	(Denmark) Dennis Bager	93
6	(South Korea) Park Kyung-mo	106

=== Section 4 ===
1st round
7	(Russia) Baljinima Tsyrempilov	166
58	(Germany) Christian Stubbe	152
39	(China) Chen Hongyuan	154
26	(India) Satyadev Prasad	161
23	(Turkey) Ozdemir Akbal	164
42	(Chinese Taipei) Su Wen-pin	156
55	(Turkey) Tunc Kucukkayalar	161
10	(Sweden) Mattias Eriksson	162
15	(Kazakhstan) Stanislav Zabrodski	158*
50	(India) Kailash	158
47	(Poland) Zbigniew Stanieczek	163
18	(Germany) Michael Frankenberg	159
31	(Japan) Keichi Tanaka	165
34	(Spain) Javier Fernández	157
63	(Sweden) Mikael Larsson	152
2	(South Korea) Yeon Jung-ki	166

2nd round
7	(Russia) Baljinima Tsyrempilov	162
26	(India) Satyadev Prasad	157
23	(Turkey) Ozdemir Akbal	167
10	(Sweden) Mattias Eriksson	168
15	(Kazakhstan) Stanislav Zabrodski	168
47	(Poland) Zbigniew Stanieczek	150
31	(Japan) Keichi Tanaka	165
2	(South Korea) Yeon Jung-ki	168

3rd round
7	(Russia) Baljinima Tsyrempilov	170
10	(Sweden) Mattias Eriksson	159
15	(Kazakhstan) Stanislav Zabrodski	171
2	(South Korea) Yeon Jung-ki	174

Quarterfinal
7	(Russia) Baljinima Tsyrempilov	107
2	(South Korea) Yeon Jung-ki	113

== Finals ==
Quarterfinals
16	(France) Lionel Torres	110
40	(Belarus) Anton Prilepau	108
21	(United Kingdom) Simon Needham	102
4	(Italy) Ilario di Buo	110
46	(Denmark) Dennis Bager	93
6	(South Korea) Park Kyung-mo	106
7	(Russia) Baljinima Tsyrempilov	107
2	(South Korea) Yeon Jung-ki	113

Semifinals
16	(France) Lionel Torres	111*
4	(Italy) Ilario di Buo	111
6	(South Korea) Park Kyung-mo	113
2	(South Korea) Yeon Jung-ki	115

Finals
16	(France) Lionel Torres	114
2	(South Korea) Yeon Jung-ki	115
Third place
4	(Italy) Ilario di Buo	109
6	(South Korea) Park Kyung-mo	110
