= 2001 World Archery Championships – Men's team recurve =

The men's team recurve competition at the 2001 World Archery Championships took place in September 2001 in Beijing, China. 125 archers took part in the men's recurve qualification round with no more than 4 from each country, and the 16 teams of 3 archers with the highest cumulative totals (out of a possible 26) qualified for the 4-round knockout round, drawn according to their qualification round scores.

== Seeds ==
Seedings were based on the combined total of the team members' qualification scores in the individual ranking rounds. The top 16 teams were assigned places in the draw depending on their overall ranking.

1. (Italy) Michele Frangilli / Ilario di Buo / Matteo Bisiani (2nd place)
2. (South Korea) Yeon Jung-ki / Lee Chang-hwan / Park Kyung-mo (champions)
3. (Japan) Hiroshi Yamamoto / Takayoshi Matsushita / Keichi Tanaka (1st round)
4. (Ukraine) Viktor Ruban / Oleksandr Serdyuk / Igor Parkhomenko (quarterfinal)
5. (Sweden) Mattias Eriksson / Magnus Petersson / Niklas Eriksson (4th place)
6. (Germany) Erich Kloos / Michael Frankenberg / Christian Stubbe (quarterfinal)
7. (Czech Republic) Daniel Kravacek / Martin Bulíř / Pavel Jurak (1st round)
8. (Russia) Baljinima Tsyrempilov / Gennady Metrofanov / Yuri Leontiev (1st round)
9. (France) Lionel Torres / Jocelyn de Grandis / Willy Ardiet (quarterfinal)
10. (Belgium) Nico Hendrickx / Christophe Peignois / Alain Autem (quarterfinal)
11. (Chinese Taipei) Shih Cheng-te / Su Wen-pin / Chen Szu-yuan (1st round)
12. (Poland) Jacek Proć / Zbigniew Stanieczek / Bartosz Mikos (1st round)
13. (Denmark) Hasse Pavia Lind / Dennis Bager / Morten Caspersen (1st round)
14. (China) Chen Hongyuan / Sun Jian / Yang Bo (3rd place)
15. (Kazakhstan) Stanislav Zabrodski / Alexandre Kislitsin / Vladimir Krivov (1st round)
16. (India) Satyadev Prasad / Kailash / Lalrem Sanga Changte (1st round)

== Draw ==
1st round
1	Italy	249
16	India	239
9	France	238
8	Russia	234
5	Sweden	240
12	Poland	232
13	Denmark	245
4	Ukraine	246
3	Japan	243
14	China	246
11	Chinese Taipei	239
6	Germany	251
7	Czech Republic
10	Belgium	w/o
15	Kazakhstan	241
2	South Korea	245

Quarterfinals
1	Italy	254
9	France	235
5	Sweden	243
4	Ukraine	239
14	China	244
6	Germany	243
10	Belgium	240
2	South Korea	250

Semifinals
1	Italy	242
5	Sweden Sweden	234
14	China	238
2	South Korea	249

Finals
1	Italy	244
2	South Korea	247
Third place
5	Sweden	241
14	China	247
