= Archery at the 2000 Summer Olympics – Men's individual =

Archery at the Olympics

Men's individual at the Games of the XXVII Olympiad
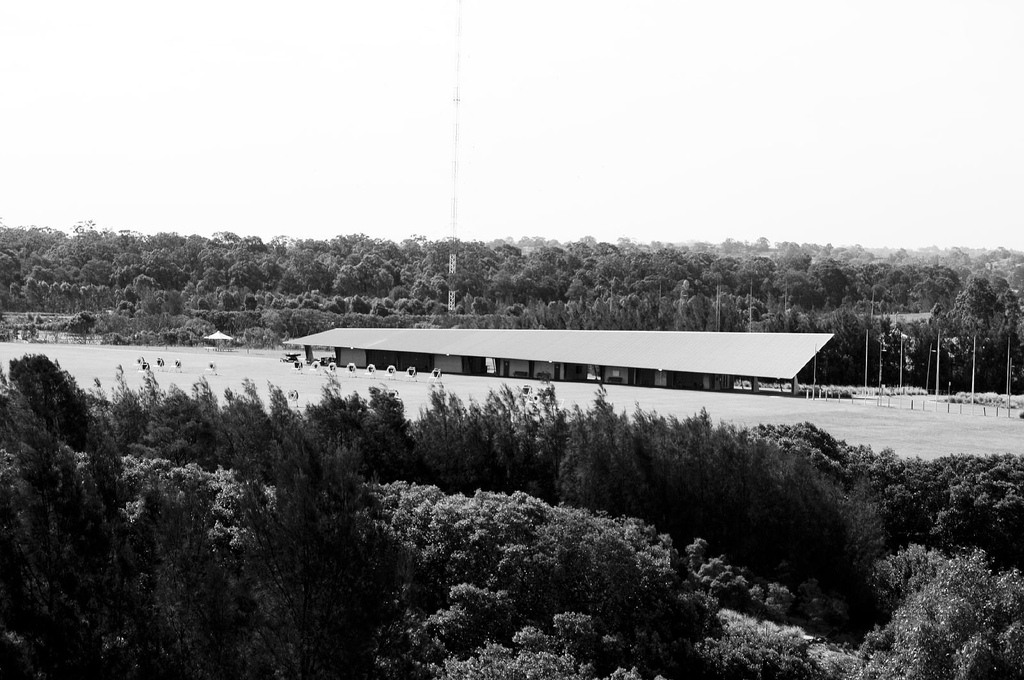
- The Sydney International Archery Park, where the event took place
- Venue: Sydney International Archery Park
- Date: 16–20 September 2000

Medalists
1st place, gold medalist(s)		Simon Fairweather	Australia
2nd place, silver medalist(s)		Vic Wunderle	United States
3rd place, bronze medalist(s)		Wietse van Alten	Netherlands

The men's individual was an archery event held as part of the Archery at the 2000 Summer Olympics programme. Like other archery events at the Olympics, it featured the recurve discipline. All archery was done at a range of 70 metres. 64 archers competed.

The competition format was unchanged from 1996. The competition began with a 72-arrow ranking round. This was followed by three elimination rounds, in which archers competed head-to-head in 18-arrow matches. After these rounds, there were 8 archers left. The quarterfinals, semifinals, and medal matches (collectively termed the "finals round") were 12-arrow matches. In all matches, losers were eliminated and received a final rank determined by their score in that round, with the exception of the semifinals. The losers of the semifinals competed in the bronze medal match.

== Schedule ==
Date	Time	Round
Saturday, 16 September 2000	14:00	Ranking Round
Monday, 18 September 2000	9:00; 14:00	Round of 64, Round of 32
Wednesday, 20 September 2000	9:00	Round of 16, Quarterfinals
Wednesday, 20 September 2000	14:00	Quarterfinals
Wednesday, 20 September 2000	15:08	Semifinals
Wednesday, 20 September 2000	15:47	Finals

== Records ==
Prior to this competition, the existing world and Olympic records were as follows.

- 72 arrow ranking round

World record	Shim Young-Sung (KOR)	685	Atlanta, United States	12 August 2004
Olympic record	Michele Frangilli (ITA)	684	Atlanta, United States	28 July 1996

- 12 arrow match

World record	Park Kyung-Mo (KOR)	119	Antalya, Turkey	28 May 1993
Olympic record	Oh Kyo-Moon (KOR)	115	Atlanta, United States	1 August 1996

== Results ==
The initial round was held on 16 September. Each archer fired 72 arrows, with the score from this round determining their seeding into the single-elimination tournament to follow.

=== Ranking Round ===
Seed	Archer	Nation	Score
1	Jang Yong-ho	South Korea	665
2	Oh Kyo-moon	South Korea	660
3	Kim Chung-tae	South Korea	655
4	Rod White	United States	651
5	Stanislav Zabrodsky	Kazakhstan	649
6	Magnus Petersson	Sweden	646
7	Vic Wunderle	United States	643
8	Simon Fairweather	Australia	642
9	Simon Needham	Great Britain	641
10	Nico Hendrickx	Belgium	640
11	Lionel Torres	France	639
12	Wietse van Alten	Netherlands	638
13	Serdar Şatır	Turkey	637
14	Özdemir Akbal	Turkey	636
15	Aleksandr Li	Kazakhstan	635
16	Fu Shengjun	China	635
17	Balzhinima Tsyrempilov	Russia	635
18	Matteo Bisiani	Italy	634
19	Michele Frangilli	Italy	634
20	Henk Vogels	Netherlands	634
21	Grzegorz Targoński	Poland	633
22	Yang Bo	China	632
23	Vadim Shikarev	Kazakhstan	632
24	Ihor Parkhomenko	Ukraine	632
25	Jocelyn de Grandis	France	632
26	Serhiy Antonov	Ukraine	631
27	Matthew Gray	Australia	631
28	Niklas Eriksson	Sweden	629
29	Fred van Zutphen	Netherlands	627
30	Ilario Di Buò	Italy	627
31	Butch Johnson	United States	627
32	Hasan Orbay	Turkey	626
33	Juan Carlos Manjarrez	Mexico	625
34	Peter Koprivnikar	Slovenia	624
35	Yuji Hamano	Japan	623
36	Jari Lipponen	Finland	622
37	Rob Rusnov	Canada	622
38	Tang Hua	China	619
39	Bair Badënov	Russia	618
40	Yuri Leontiev	Russia	617
41	Ismely Arias	Cuba	616
42	Mattias Eriksson	Sweden	616
43	Viktor Kurchenko	Ukraine	615
44	Takayoshi Matsushita	Japan	614
45	Bård Nesteng	Norway	613
46	Lars Erik Humlekjær	Norway	613
47	Martinus Grov	Norway	613
48	Peter Ebden	New Zealand	607
49	Bartosz Mikos	Poland	606
50	Masafumi Makiyama	Japan	604
51	Scott Hunter-Russell	Australia	603
52	Sébastien Flute	France	603
53	Miika Aulio	Finland	603
54	Christian Stubbe	Germany	596
55	Jubzhang Jubzhang	Bhutan	596
56	Ken Uprichard	New Zealand	596
57	Juan Carlos Stevens	Cuba	595
58	Cristóbal Merlos	El Salvador	588
59	Nuno Pombo	Portugal	572
60	Essam Sayed	Egypt	556
61	Francois Latil	Vanuatu	546
62	Yehya Bundhun	Mauritius	537
63	Dominic John Rebelo	Kenya	500
64	Kuresa Tupua	American Samoa	419

=== Competition bracket ===
==== Section 1 ====
Round of 64
1	Jang Yong-Ho (KOR)	172
64	Kuresa Tupua (ASA)	98
32	Hasan Orbay (TUR)	165
33	Juan Carlos Manjarrez (MEX)	153
17	Balzhinima Tsyrempilov (RUS)	168
48	Peter Ebden (NZL)	147
16	Fu Shengjun (CHN)	155
49	Bartosz Mikos (POL)	157
8	Simon Fairweather (AUS)	170
57	Juan Carlos Stevens (CUB)	161
25	Jocelyn de Grandis (FRA)	171
40	Yuri Leontiev (RUS)	163
24	Ihor Parkhomenko (UKR)	160
41	Ismely Arias (CUB)	164
9	Simon Needham (GBR)	160
56	Ken Uprichard (NZL)	155

Round of 32
1	Jang Yong-Ho (KOR)	169
32	Hasan Orbay (TUR)	160
17	Balzhinima Tsyrempilov (RUS)	163
49	Bartosz Mikos (POL)	154
8	Simon Fairweather (AUS)	161
25	Jocelyn de Grandis (FRA)	150
41	Ismely Arias (CUB)	164^{9}
9	Simon Needham (GBR)	164^{8}

Round of 16
1	Jang Yong-Ho (KOR)	164
17	Balzhinima Tsyrempilov (RUS)	167
8	Simon Fairweather (AUS)	167
41	Ismely Arias (CUB)	163

Quarterfinals
17	Balzhinima Tsyrempilov (RUS)	104
8	Simon Fairweather (AUS)	113

==== Section 2 ====
Round of 64
5	Stanislav Zabrodsky (KAZ)	166
60	Essam Sayed (EGY)	149
28	Niklas Eriksson (SWE)	161
37	Rob Rusnov (CAN)	155
21	Grzegorz Targoński (POL)	166
44	Takayoshi Matsushita (JPN)	164
12	Wietse van Alten (NED)	163
53	Miika Aulio (FIN)	160
4	Rod White (USA)	158
61	Francois Latil (VAN)	145
29	Fred van Zutphen (NED)	161
36	Jari Lipponen (FIN)	155
20	Henk Vogels (NED)	149
45	Bård Nesteng (NOR)	158
13	Serdar Şatır (TUR)	156
52	Sébastien Flute (FRA)	160

Round of 32
5	Stanislav Zabrodsky (KAZ)	163
28	Niklas Eriksson (SWE)	146
21	Grzegorz Targoński (POL)	157
12	Wietse van Alten (NED)	160
4	Rod White (USA)	152
29	Fred van Zutphen (NED)	153
45	Bård Nesteng (NOR)	148
52	Sébastien Flute (FRA)	160

Round of 16
5	Stanislav Zabrodsky (KAZ)	164
12	Wietse van Alten (NED)	166
29	Fred van Zutphen (NED)	159
52	Sébastien Flute (FRA)	166

Quarterfinals
12	Wietse van Alten (NED)	106
52	Sébastien Flute (FRA)	102

==== Section 3 ====
Round of 64
3	Kim Chung-tae (KOR)	169
62	Yehya Bundhun (MRI)	141
30	Ilario Di Buò (ITA)	163
35	Yuji Hamano (JPN)	158
19	Michele Frangilli (ITA)	168
46	Lars Erik Humlekjær (NOR)	158
14	Özdemir Akbal (TUR)	146
51	Scott Hunter-Russell (AUS)	154
6	Magnus Petersson (SWE)	165
59	Nuno Pombo (POR)	146
27	Matthew Gray (AUS)	161
38	Tang Hua (CHN)	163
22	Yang Bo (CHN)	164
43	Viktor Kurchenko (UKR)	155
11	Lionel Torres (FRA)	161
54	Christian Stubbe (GER)	163

Round of 32
3	Kim Chung-tae (KOR)	162
30	Ilario Di Buò (ITA)	159
19	Michele Frangilli (ITA)	164
51	Scott Hunter-Russell (AUS)	154
6	Magnus Petersson (SWE)	157
38	Tang Hua (CHN)	148
22	Yang Bo (CHN)	159
54	Christian Stubbe (GER)	152

Round of 16
3	Kim Chung-tae (KOR)	169
19	Michele Frangilli (ITA)	166
6	Magnus Petersson (SWE)	167
22	Yang Bo (CHN)	164

Quarterfinals
3	Kim Chung-tae (KOR)	111
6	Magnus Petersson (SWE)	112

==== Section 4 ====
Round of 64
7	Vic Wunderle (USA)	160
58	Cristóbal Merlos (ESA)	150
26	Serhiy Antonov (UKR)	164
39	Bair Badënov (RUS)	153
23	Vadim Shikarev (KAZ)	158
42	Mattias Eriksson (SWE)	156
10	Nico Hendrickx (BEL)	162
55	Jubzhang Jubzhang (BHU)	156
2	Oh Kyo-Moon (KOR)	168
63	Dominic John Rebelo (KEN)	132
31	Butch Johnson (USA)	164
34	Peter Koprivnikar (SLO)	151
18	Matteo Bisiani (ITA)	166
47	Martinus Grov (NOR)	158
15	Alexandr Li (KAZ)	150
50	Masafumi Makiyama (JPN)	151

Round of 32
7	Vic Wunderle (USA)	152
26	Serhiy Antonov (UKR)	151
23	Vadim Shikarev (KAZ)	154
10	Nico Hendrickx (BEL)	151
2	Oh Kyo-Moon (KOR)	166
31	Butch Johnson (USA)	160
18	Matteo Bisiani (ITA)	159
50	Masafumi Makiyama (JPN)	162

Round of 16
7	Vic Wunderle (USA)	171
23	Vadim Shikarev (KAZ)	166
2	Oh Kyo-Moon (KOR)	166
50	Masafumi Makiyama (JPN)	160

Quarterfinals
7	Vic Wunderle (USA)	108
2	Oh Kyo-Moon (KOR)	105

==== Finals ====
Semifinals
Simon Fairweather (AUS)	112
Wietse van Alten (NED)	110
Magnus Petersson (SWE)	107
Vic Wunderle (USA)	108

Final
Simon Fairweather (AUS)	113
Vic Wunderle (USA)	106
Bronze medal match
Wietse van Alten (NED)	114
Magnus Petersson (SWE)	109

Rank	Athlete	1	2	3	4	5	6	7	8	9	10	11	12	Total	Note
1st place, gold medalist(s)	Simon Fairweather (AUS)	9	10	10	9	9	10	9	9	10	10	10	8	113	Gold Medal Match
2nd place, silver medalist(s)	Vic Wunderle (USA)	8	9	8	9	8	10	10	9	9	9	9	8	106	Gold Medal Match
3rd place, bronze medalist(s)	Wietse van Alten (NED)	9	10	10	10	10	9	10	8	10	10	9	9	114	Bronze Medal Match
4	Magnus Petersson (SWE)	10	9	10	9	9	8	10	9	9	9	9	8	109	Bronze Medal Match

== Sources ==
- Official Report
- Wudarski, Pawel (1999). "Wyniki Igrzysk Olimpijskich" (in Polish). Archived from the original on 18 January 2008.
