= 2003 World Archery Championships – Men's individual recurve =

The men's individual recurve competition at the 2003 World Archery Championships took place in July 2003 in New York City, United States. 174 archers entered the competition. Following a qualifying 144 arrow FITA round, the top 64 archers qualified for the 6-round knockout tournament, drawn according to their qualification round scores. The semi-finals and finals then took place on 20 July.

Despite Korean archers dominating the qualification tournament, Italian Michele Frangilli was victorious, becoming the first non-Korean winner of the men's individual recurve tournament since 1991.

== Qualifying ==
The following archers were the leading 8 qualifiers:

1. (South Korea) Jang Yong-ho (3rd round)
2. (South Korea) Choi Young-kwang (3rd round)
3. (South Korea) Im Dong-hyun (2nd place)
4. (South Korea) Park Kyung-mo (3rd round)
5. (Italy) Marco Galiazzo (1st round)
6. (Russia) Baljinima Tsyrempilov (2nd round)
7. (Australia) David Barnes (3rd place)
8. (Italy) Michele Frangilli (Champion)

== Full draw ==
=== Section 1 ===
1st round
1	(South Korea) Jang Yong-ho	166
64	(Australia) Andrew Lindsay	156
33	(Denmark) Dennis Bager	151
32	(Germany) Alexander Froese	154
17	(China) Xue Haifeng	157
48	(China) Chen Hongyuan	165
49	(India) Acharya Ved Kumar	150
16	(Chinese Taipei) Wang Cheng-pang	162
9	(Ukraine) Oleksandr Serdyuk	161
56	(Norway) Bård Nesteng	143
41	(Spain) Felipe López	158
24	(Turkey) Hasan Orbay	153
25	(United States) Butch Johnson	163
40	(Kazakhstan) Vitali Shin	157
57	(Sweden) Mattias Eriksson	158
8	(Italy) Michele Frangilli	162

2nd round
1	(South Korea) Jang Yong-ho	166
32	(Germany) Alexander Froese	157
48	(China) Chen Hongyuan	156
16	(Chinese Taipei) Wang Cheng-pang	158
9	(Ukraine) Oleksandr Serdyuk	164
41	(Spain) Felipe López	160
25	(United States) Butch Johnson	159
8	(Italy) Michele Frangilli	167

3rd round
1	(South Korea) Jang Yong-ho	165
16	(Chinese Taipei) Wang Cheng-pang	166
9	(Ukraine) Oleksandr Serdyuk	154
8	(Italy) Michele Frangilli	161

Quarterfinal
16	(Chinese Taipei) Wang Cheng-pang	109
8	(Italy) Michele Frangilli	110

=== Section 2 ===
1st round
5	(Italy) Marco Galiazzo	153
60	(Mexico) Eduardo Vélez	160
37	(Poland) Piotr Piątek	160
28	(Australia) Tim Cuddihy	163
21	(India) Santyadev Prasad	153
44	(Russia) Dmitri Nevmerjitsky	144
53	(United Kingdom) Roy Nash	155
12	(Belarus) Anton Prilepau	158
13	(Denmark) Hasse Pavia Lind	160
52	(China) Huang Zhongsheng	149
45	(Germany) Michael Frankenberg	150
20	(Australia) Matthew Gray	159
29	(Italy) Ilario di Buo	153
36	(Japan) Takaharu Furukawa	154
61	(India) Tarundeep Rai	161
4	(South Korea) Park Kyung-mo	165

2nd round
60	(Mexico) Eduardo Vélez	158
28	(Australia) Tim Cuddihy	163
21	(India) Santyadev Prasad	158
12	(Belarus) Anton Prilepau	152
13	(Denmark) Hasse Pavia Lind	162
20	(Australia) Matthew Gray	156
36	(Japan) Takaharu Furukawa	154
4	(South Korea) Park Kyung-mo	165

3rd round
28	(Australia) Tim Cuddihy	161
21	(India) Santyadev Prasad	154
13	(Denmark) Hasse Pavia Lind	165
4	(South Korea) Park Kyung-mo	163

Quarterfinal
28	(Australia) Tim Cuddihy	108
13	(Denmark) Hasse Pavia Lind	107

=== Section 3 ===
1st round
3	(South Korea) Im Dong-yun	162
62	(Sweden) Mikael Larsson	160
35	(Russia) Bair Badenov	154
30	(Mexico) Juan René Serrano	152
19	(Spain) Javier Fernández	147
46	(Japan) Hiroshi Yamamoto	159
51	(Chinese Taipei) Hsu Tzu-yi	156
14	(Japan) Yuji Hamano	157
11	(United States) Victor Wunderle	157
54	(France) Lionel Torres	158
43	(Russia) Yuri Leontiev	155
22	(Netherlands) Wietse van Alten	163
27	(Ukraine) Viktor Ruban	155
38	(Luxembourg) Jeff Henckels	157
59	(United States) Glenn L Meyers	155
6	(Russia) Baljinima Tsyrempilov	160

2nd round
3	(South Korea) Im Dong-hyun	162
35	(Russia) Bair Badenov	158
46	(Japan) Hiroshi Yamamoto	159
14	(Japan) Yuji Hamano	162
54	(France) Lionel Torres	158
22	(Netherlands) Wietse van Alten	162
38	(Luxembourg) Jeff Henckels	164
6	(Russia) Baljinima Tsyrempilov	162

3rd round
3	(South Korea) Im Dong-hyun	163
14	(Japan) Yuji Hamano	153
22	(Netherlands) Wietse van Alten	157
38	(Luxembourg) Jeff Henckels	154

Quarterfinal
3	(South Korea) Im Dong-hyun	110
22	(Netherlands) Wietse van Alten	108

=== Section 4 ===
1st round
7	(Australia) David Barnes	164
58	(Belarus) Mikalai Marusau	150
39	(United Kingdom) Simon Needham	149
26	(France) Jocelyn de Grandis	164
23	(Belgium) Nico Hendrickx	156
42	(France) Franck Fisseux	164
55	(Israel) Yaron Kolesnik	155
10	(Netherlands) Pieter Custers	162
15	(Sweden) Magnus Petersson	158
50	(Ukraine) Igor Parkhomenko	160
47	(China) Jiang Lin	146
18	(Chinese Taipei) Chen Szu-yuan	155
31	(Bulgaria) Yavor Hristov	151
34	(Poland) Jacek Proć	157
63	(Italy) Francesco Lunelli	136
2	(South Korea) Choi Young-kwang	161

2nd round
7	(Australia) David Barnes	165
26	(France) Jocelyn de Grandis	163
42	(France) Franck Fisseux	170
10	(Netherlands) Pieter Custers	164
50	(Ukraine) Igor Parkhomenko	162
18	(Chinese Taipei) Chen Szu-yuan	163
34	(Poland) Jacek Proć	160
2	(South Korea) Choi Young-kwang	173

3rd round
7	(Australia) David Barnes	166
42	(France) Franck Fisseux	160
18	(Chinese Taipei) Chen Szu-yuan	165
2	(South Korea) Choi Young-kwang	151

Quarterfinal
7	(Australia) David Barnes	115
18	(Chinese Taipei) Chen Szu-yuan	108

== Finals ==
Quarterfinals
16	(Chinese Taipei) Wang Cheng-pang	109
8	(Italy) Michele Frangilli	110
28	(Australia) Tim Cuddihy	108
13	(Denmark) Hasse Pavia Lind	107
3	(South Korea) Im Dong-hyun	110
22	(Netherlands) Wietse van Alten	108
7	(Australia) David Barnes	115
18	(Chinese Taipei) Chen Szu-yuan	108

Semifinals
8	(Italy) Michele Frangilli	109
28	(Australia) Tim Cuddihy	107
3	(South Korea) Im Dong-hyun	112
7	(Australia) David Barnes	107

Finals
8	(Italy) Michele Frangilli	113
3	(South Korea) Im Dong-hyun	112
Third place
28	(Australia) Tim Cuddihy	106
7	(Australia) David Barnes	115
