= Ukraine at the 2000 Summer Olympics =

- IOC code: UKR
- NOC: National Olympic Committee of Ukraine
- Website: www.noc-ukr.org (in Ukrainian and English)

in Sydney
- Competitors: 230 (139 men and 91 women) in 23 sports
- Flag bearer: Yevhen Braslavets
- Medals Ranked 21st: Gold 3 Silver 10 Bronze 10 Total 23

Summer Olympics appearances (overview)
- 1996; 2000; 2004; 2008; 2012; 2016; 2020; 2024

Other related appearances
- Austria (1896–1912); Hungary (1896–1912); Russian Empire (1900–1912); Czechoslovakia (1920–1936); Poland (1924–1936); Romania (1924–1936); Soviet Union (1952–1988); Unified Team (1992)

Ukraine competed at the 2000 Summer Olympics in Sydney, Australia. 230 competitors, 139 men and 91 women, took part in 185 events in 23 sports.

== Medalists ==
=== Gold ===
- Mykola Milchev — Shooting, Men's Skeet Shooting
- Yana Klochkova — Swimming, Women's 200 m Individual Medley
- Yana Klochkova — Swimming, Women's 400 m Individual Medley

=== Silver ===
- Kateryna Serdyuk, Nataliya Burdeyna, and Olena Sadovnycha — Archery, Women's Team
- Andreas Kotelnik — Boxing, Men's Lightweight
- Serhiy Dotsenko — Boxing, Men's Welterweight
- Serhii Cherniavskyi, Oleksandr Fedenko, Serhiy Matveyev, and Oleksandr Symonenko — Cycling, Men's 4000 m Team Pursuit
- Oleksandr Beresch, Valeriy Honcharov, Ruslan Mezentsev, Valeriy Pereshkura, Oleksandr Svitlychniy, and Roman Zozulya — Gymnastics, Men's Team Combined Exercises
- Oksana Tsyhuleva — Gymnastics, Women's Trampoline Individual
- Denys Sylantyev — Swimming, Men's 200 m Butterfly
- Yana Klochkova — Swimming, Women's 800 m Freestyle
- Davyd Saldadze — Wrestling, Men's Greco-Roman Heavyweight (97 kg)
- Yevhen Buslovych — Wrestling, Men's Freestyle Bantamweight (58 kg)

=== Bronze ===
- Roman Schurenko — Athletics, Men's Long Jump
- Olena Hovorova — Athletics, Women's Triple Jump
- Volodymyr Sydorenko — Boxing, Men's Flyweight
- Serhiy Danylchenko — Boxing, Men's Bantamweight
- Andriy Fedchuk — Boxing, Men's Light Heavyweight
- Iryna Yanovych — Cycling, Women's Sprint
- Hanna Sorokina and Olena Zhupina — Diving, Women's Synchronised Springboard
- Oleksandr Beresch — Gymnastics, Men's All-around Individual
- Ruslan Mashurenko — Judo, Men's Middleweight (90 kg)
- Olena Pakholchik and Ruslana Taran — Sailing, Women's 470 Team Competition

== Archery ==
The silver medal that the Ukrainian women's team won in Sydney was the best result the Ukrainian archery squad had yet posted.

Men

Athlete	Event	Ranking round		Round of 64	Round of 32	Round of 16	Quarterfinals	Semifinals	Final / BM	
Athlete	Event	Score	Seed	Opposition Score	Opposition Score	Opposition Score	Opposition Score	Opposition Score	Opposition Score	Rank
Serhiy Antonov	Men's individual	631	26	Bair Badënov (RUS) (39); W 164–153	Vic Wunderle (USA) (7); L 151–152	Did not advance				26
Viktor Kurchenko	Men's individual	615	43	Yang Bo (CHN) (22); L 155–164	Did not advance					43
Ihor Parkhomenko	Men's individual	632	24	Ismely Arias (CUB) (41); L 160-164	Did not advance					37
Serhiy Antonov; Viktor Kurchenko; Ihor Parkhomenko	Team	1878	9	—		China (8); W 244–235	South Korea (1); L 236–258	Did not advance		8

Women

Athlete	Event	Ranking round		Round of 64	Round of 32	Round of 16	Quarterfinals	Semifinals	Final / BM	
Athlete	Event	Score	Seed	Opposition Score	Opposition Score	Opposition Score	Opposition Score	Opposition Score	Opposition Score	Rank
Nataliya Burdeyna	Women's individual	632	26	Zekiye Satır (TUR) (39); W 166–157	Choe Ok-sil (PRK) (7); L 160–162	Did not advance				26
Olena Sadovnycha	Women's individual	658	5	Agata Bulwa (POL) (60); W 163–155	Anna Łęcka (POL) (28); L 158–159	Did not advance				17
Kateryna Serdyuk	Women's individual	644	10	Irene Franchini (ITA) (55); W 157–144	Barbara Mensing (GER) (23); L 153–161	Did not advance				18
Olena Sadovnycha; Kateryna Serdyuk; Nataliya Burdeyna	Team	1934	2	—		BYE	Italy (7); W 237–230	Turkey (6); W 240–233	South Korea (1); L 251–239	

== Athletics ==
Key

- Note–Ranks given for track events are within the athlete's heat only
- Q = Qualified for the next round
- q = Qualified for the next round as a fastest loser or, in field events, by position without achieving the qualifying target
- NR = National record
- N/A = Round not applicable for the event
- Bye = Athlete not required to compete in round

Men
Track & road events

Athlete	Event	Heat		Quarterfinal		Semifinal		Final	
Athlete	Event	Result	Rank	Result	Rank	Result	Rank	Result	Rank
Anatoliy Dovhal	100 m	10.48		Did not advance					
Gennadiy Gorbenko	400 m hurdles	49.12		—		48.40		49.01	8
Ivan Heshko	1500 m	03:41.80		Did not advance					
Oleksandr Kaydash	400 m	46.88		Did not advance					
Serhiy Lebid	5000 m	13:29.69		Did not advance				13:37.80	7
Sergiy Redko	3000 m steeplechase	08:40.51	9	Did not advance					
Kostyantyn Rurak	100 m	10.48	Q	10.38		Did not advance			
Oleksiy Shelest	50 km walk	—						4:07:39	32
Gennadiy Gorbenko; Oleksandr Kaydash; Roman Voronko; Yevgeniy Zyukov	4 × 400 m relay	03:05.41	q	—		03:02.68		Did not advance	

Field events

Athlete	Event	Qualification		Final	
Athlete	Event	Distance	Position	Distance	Position
Yuriy Bilonog	Shot put	20.53	Q	20.84	5
Sergey Bubka	Pole vault	DNS		Did not advance	
Kyryle Chuprynn	Discus throw	58.38		Did not advance	
Sergii Dymchenko	High jump	2.27		2.29	9
Ruslan Glyvynskyy	High jump	2.15		Did not advance	
Sergii Izmailov	Triple Jump	16.10		Did not advance	
Oleksandr Krykun	Hammer throw	74.83		Did not advance	
Olexiy Lukashevych	Long jump	8.01		8.26	4
Vladyslav Piskunov	Hammer throw	76.08		Did not advance	
Roman Schurenko	Long jump	8.01		8.31	
Andriy Skvaruk	Hammer throw	79.55	Q	75.50	10
Andriy Sokolovskyy	High jump	2.24		Did not advance	
Denys Yurchenko	Pole vault	5.40		Did not advance	
Roman Virastyuk	Shot put	19.27		Did not advance	

Combined events – Decathlon

Athlete	Event	100	LJ	SP	HJ	400 m	110H	DT	PV	JT	1500 m	Final	Rank
Fedir Laukhin	Result	11.21	7.01	13.16	2.03	49.64	15.16	38.33	4.90	55.53	04:41.48	7652	23
Fedir Laukhin	Points											7652	23
Volodymyr Mykhailenko	Result	11.10	7.04	13.53	2.06	48.80	14.84	40.45	4.60	47.27	04:36.23	7676	22
Volodymyr Mykhailenko	Points											7676	22
Oleksandr Yurkov	Result	10.89	6.68	14.78	1.97	48.66	15.02	48.67	5.00	54.77	04:39.94	7993	16
Oleksandr Yurkov	Points											7993	16

Women
Track & road events

Athlete	Event	Heat		Quarterfinal		Semifinal		Final	
Athlete	Event	Result	Rank	Result	Rank	Result	Rank	Result	Rank
Nadiya Bodrova	100 m hurdles	13.25		Did not advance					
Olena Buzhenko	800 m	02:03.48		Did not advance					
Tetyana Debela	400 m hurdles	57.33		Did not advance					
Olena Krasovska	100 m hurdles	13.15	q	13.02	q	13.02		Did not advance	
Anzhela Kravchenko	100 m	11.35	Q	11.32		Did not advance			
Tetyana Kryvobok	1500 m	04:22.11		Did not advance					
Olena Pastushenko	200 m	23.64	Q	23.63		Did not advance			
Zhanna Pintusevych	100 m	11.27	Q	11.08	Q	11.32	Q	11.20	4
Zhanna Pintusevych	200 m	23.13	Q	22.70	Q	22.74	Q	22.66	7
Iryna Pukha	100 m	11.41	Q	11.54		Did not advance			
Olena Rurak	400 m	53.45		Did not advance					
Valentyna Savchuk	20 km walk	—						1:33:22	12
Mayya Shemchishena	100 m hurdles	13.18		Did not advance					
Tetyana Tereshchuk-Antipova	400 m hurdles	56.27	Q	—		54.25		53.98	5
Vira Zozulya	20 km walk	—						1:35:43	24
Olena Krasovska; Anzhela Kravchenko; Olena Pastushenko; Iryna Pukha	4 × 100 m relay	43.93		Did not advance		43.31		Did not advance	

Field events

Athlete	Event	Qualification		Final	
Athlete	Event	Distance	Position	Distance	Position
Olena Antonova	Discus throw	60.73		Did not advance	
Inga Babakova	High jump	1.94		1.96	5
Anzhela Balakhonova	Pole vault	4.30	Q	NM	12
Olena Hovorova	Triple jump	14.76	Q	14.96	
Olena Khlusovych	Triple jump	13.60		Did not advance	
Tetyana Lyakhovych	Javelin throw	57.41		Did not advance	
Iryna Mykhalchenko	High jump	1.85		Did not advance	
Vita Palamar	High jump	1.94	Q	1.96	7
Iryna Sekachova	Hammer throw	61.44		Did not advance	
Olena Shekhovtsova	Long jump	6.65	Q	6.37	12
Viktoriya Vershynina	Long jump	6.56		Did not advance	

Combined events – Heptathlon

Athlete	Event	100H	HJ	SP	200	LJ	JT	800 m	Final	Rank
Lyudmyla Kovalova	Result	15.12	1.72	13.57	26.36	5.57	42.50	02:13.52	5585	23
Lyudmyla Kovalova	Points								5585	23
Larysa Necheporuk	Result	14.53	1.72	13.56	25.76	5.89	44.57	02:19.94	5762	20
Larysa Necheporuk	Points								5762	20

== Badminton ==
Athlete	Event	Round of 64	Round of 32	Round of 16	Quarterfinal	Semifinal	Final / BM	
Athlete	Event	Opposition Score	Opposition Score	Opposition Score	Opposition Score	Opposition Score	Opposition Score	Rank
Vladislav Druzchenko	Men's singles	BYE	Pullela Gopichand (IND); L 3–15, 15–10, 7–15	Did not advance				
Elena Nozdran	Women's singles	BYE	Lee Kyung-won (KOR); L 1–11, 5–11	Did not advance				
Victoria Evtoushenko; Elena Nozdran	Women's singles	—	Ann-Lou Jorgensen; Mette Schjoldager (DEN); L 3–15, 15–11, 11–15	Did not advance				
Victoria Evtoushenko; Vladislav Druzchenko	Mixed doubles	—	Ha Tae-kwon; Chung Jae Hee (KOR); L 9–15, 5–15	Did not advance				

== Boxing ==
Men

Athlete	Event	Round of 32	Round of 16	Quarterfinals	Semifinals	Final	
Athlete	Event	Opposition Result	Opposition Result	Opposition Result	Opposition Result	Opposition Result	Rank
Valeriy Sydorenko	Light Flyweight	José Albuquerque (BRA); W 12–7	Suban Punnon (THA); W RSC	Maikro Romero (CUB); L 5–12	Did not advance		5
Vladimir Sidorenko	Flyweight	Daniel Ponce de León (MEX); W 16–8	Omar Narvaez (ARG); W 16–10	Andrzej Rzany (POL); W RSC	Wijan Ponlid (THA); L 11–14	Did not advance	
Sergey Danilchenko	Bantamweight	BYE	Ngangom Dingko Singh (IND); W 14–5	Justin Kane (AUS); W RSC	Raimkul Malakhbekov (RUS); W 10–15	Did not advance	
Servin Suleymanov	Featherweight	Juri Mladenov (BUL); L 4–7	Did not advance				
Andriy Kotelnyk	Lightweight	Larry Semillano (PHI); W RSC	Raymond Narh (GHA); W 17–11	Nurzhan Karimzhanov (KAZ); W RSC	Cristián Bejarano (MEX); W 22–14	Mario Kindelán (CUB); L 4–14	
Vyacheslav Senchenko	Light Welterweight	Saleh Abdelbary Abdel Maksoud (EGY); L 16–19	Did not advance				
Sergey Dotsenko	Welterweight	Guillermo Saputo (ARG); W 12–7	Parkpoom Jangphonak (THA); W 13–5	Danijar Muneitbasov (KAZ); W 8–7	Vitalie Gruşac (MDA); W 17–8	Oleg Saitov (RUS); L 16–24	
Oleksandr Zubrihin	Middleweight	BYE	Mohamed Mesbahi (MAR); W 9–5	Zsolt Erdei (HUN); L 9–14	Did not advance		5
Andriy Fedchuk	Light Heavyweight	Azize Raguig (MAR); W RSC	Charles Adamu (GHA); W 13–5	Gurcharan Singh (IND); W 12–12	Rudolf Kraj (CZE); L 7–11	Did not advance	
Alexandr Yatsenko	Heavyweight	BYE	Ruslan Chagaev (UZB); L 2–15	Did not advance			
Oleksiy Mazikin	Super Heavyweight	BYE	Angus Whare Shelford (NZL); W 19–5	Audley Harrison (GBR); L 9–19	Did not advance		5

== Canoeing ==
=== Sprint ===
Men

Athlete	Event	Heats		Repechage		Semifinals		Final	
Athlete	Event	Time	Rank	Time	Rank	Time	Rank	Time	Rank
Michał Śliwiński	C-1 500 m	1:53.682	6 QS	—		1:52.461	3 QF	2:33.129	7
Vladyslav Tereshchenko	K-1 1000 m	3:39.517	4 QS	—		3:46.833	9	Did not advance	
Serhiy Klyniuk; Dmytro Sablin	C-2 500 m	1:42.903	2 QF	—		BYE		2:02.612	8
Roman Bundz; Leonid Kamlochuk	C-2 1000 m	3:47.150	5 QS	—		3:47.298	6	Did not advance	

Women

Athlete	Event	Heats		Repechage		Semifinals		Final	
Athlete	Event	Time	Rank	Time	Rank	Time	Rank	Time	Rank
Inna Osypenko	K-1 500 m	2:02.712	9	Did not advance					
Hanna Balabanova; Nataliya Feklisova	K-2 500 m	1:46.942	5 QS	—		1:47.370	4	Did not advance	
Hanna Balabanova; Nataliya Feklisova; Olena Cherevatova; Mariya Ralcheva	K-4 500 m	1:35.454	4 QS	—		1:37.704	1 QF	1:37.544	5

Qualification Legend: 'R = Qualify to repechage; QS = Qualify to semi-final; QF = Qualify directly to final

== Cycling ==
=== Road ===
Men

Athlete	Event	Time	Rank
Vladimir Duma	Men's road race	5:30:46	27
Olexandr Fedenko	Men's road race	5:30:46	42
Volodimir Gustov	Men's road race	5:30:46	65
Serhiy Honchar	Men's road race	DNF	
Serhiy Honchar	Men's time trial	0:59:20	9
Sergiy Matveyev	Men's time trial	1:00:25	18
Serguei Outschakov	Men's road race	5:30:46	39

Women

Athlete	Event	Time	Rank
Valentyna Karpenko	Women's road race	3:10:33	33
Oksana Saprykina	Women's road race	3:06:31	19
Tetyana Styazhkina	Women's road race	3:06:31	17
Tetyana Styazhkina	Women's time trial	0:44:45	19

=== Track ===
==== Men ====
Pursuit

Athlete	Event	Qualifying round		Quarter-finals	Semi-finals	Finals	
Athlete	Event	Time	Rank	Opposition Time	Opposition Time	Opposition Time	Rank
Sergiy Matveyev	Men's Individual pursuit	04:25.380	7	—	Did not advance		7
Alexander Symonenko	Men's Individual pursuit	04:23.983	6	—	Did not advance		6
Sergiy Matveyev; Oleksandr Fedenko; Serhii Cherniavskyi; Alexander Symonenko	Men's team pursuit	04:04.078	2 Q	Netherlands (NED); W 04:03.359	Netherlands (GBR); W 04:00.830 WR	Netherlands (GER); W 04:04.520	

Points race

Athlete	Event	Points	Laps	Rank
Vasyl Yakovlev	Men's points race	5	0	17

Madison

Athlete	Event	Points	Laps	Rank
Vasyl Yakovlev; Oleksandr Fedenko	Madison	8	0	9

==== Women ====
Time trial

Athlete	Event	Time	Rank
Iryna Yanovych	Women's 500m time trial	35.512	9

Sprint

Athlete	Event	Qualifying round		1/8 final		1/8 repechage		Classification 9–12		Quarter-finals		Classification 5–8		Semi-finals		Finals	
Athlete	Event	Time	Rank	Time	Rank	Time	Rank	Time	Rank	Time	Rank	Time	Rank	Time	Rank	Time	Rank
Iryna Yanovych	Women's sprint	11.548	7 Q	Szabolcsi (HUN); W 12.015	1	BYE				Dubnicoff (CAN); W 12.048; 11.946	1	BYE		Grichina (RUS); L 12.594; 12.726	2	Ferris (AUS); W 12.156; 13.310	

=== Mountain biking ===
Men

Athlete	Event	Time	Rank
Sergiy Rysenko	Men's cross-country	02:20:39	27

== Diving ==
Men

Athlete	Event	Preliminaries		Semifinal				Final			
Athlete	Event	Points	Rank	Points	Rank	Total	Rank	Points	Rank	Total	Rank
Dmytro Lysenko	3 m springboard	345.54	27	Did not advance							
Eduard Safonov	3 m springboard	355.05	25	Did not advance							
Olexsandr Skrypnik	10m platform	362.82	23	Did not advance							
Roman Volod'kov	10m platform	377.04	21	Did not advance							
Olexsandr Skrypnik; Roman Volod'kov	Synchronized 10 m platform	—						332.22	6	332.22	6

Women

Athlete	Event	Preliminaries		Semifinal				Final			
Athlete	Event	Points	Rank	Points	Rank	Total	Rank	Points	Rank	Total	Rank
Ganna Sorokina	3 m springboard	291.39	8	210.63	16	502.02	10	302.34	11	512.97	11
Olga Yefimenko	3 m springboard	265.74	16	215.25	15	480.99	14	Did not advance			
Svitlana Serbina	10m platform	230.64	32	Did not advance							
Olena Zhupina	10m platform	304.65	9	173.16	7	477.81	8	315.93	7	489.09	6
Ganna Sorokina; Olena Zhupina	Synchronized 3 m springboard	—						290.34	3	290.34	

== Fencing ==
Ten fencers, seven men and three women, represented Ukraine in 2000.

Men

Athlete	Event	Round of 64	Round of 32	Round of 16	Quarterfinal	Semifinal	Final / BM	
Athlete	Event	Opposition Score	Opposition Score	Opposition Score	Opposition Score	Opposition Score	Opposition Score	Rank
Oleksiy Bryzhalov	Individual foil	Oleksiy Kruhliak (UKR); L 9–15	Did not advance					34
Serhiy Holubytskiy	Individual foil	BYE	James Beevers (GBR); W 15–1	Matteo Zennaro (ITA); W 15–12	Kim Yeong-Ho (KOR); L 5–15	Did not advance		6
Oleksiy Kruhliak	Individual foil	Oleksiy Bryzhalov (UKR); W 15–9	Ralf Bißdorf (GER); L 7–15	Did not advance				31
Oleksiy Kruhliak; Serhiy Holubytskiy; Oleksiy Bryzhalov	Team foil	—			Italy; L 40–41	Classification semi-final Russia; W 45–36	5th place final Germany; W 45–43	5
Oleksandr Horbachuk	Men's épée	Nelson Loyola (CUB); W 15–14	Jörg Fiedler (GER); W 9–8	Éric Srecki (FRA); L 11–15	Did not advance			16
Vadym Huttsait	Individual sabre	BYE	Rafał Sznajder (POL); W 15–14	Domonkos Ferjancsik (HUN); W 10–15	Did not advance			13
Volodymyr Kaliuzhniy	Individual sabre	Tonhi Terenzi (ITA); L 10–15	Did not advance					25
Volodymyr Lukashenko	Individual sabre	Masashi Nagara (JPN); W 15–7	Sergey Sharikov (RUS); L 11–15	Did not advance				29
Vadym Huttsait; Volodymyr Lukashenko; Volodymyr Kaliuzhniy	Team sabre	—		BYE	France; L 31–45	Classification semi-final Italy; W 45–29	5th place final Hungary; L 43–45	6

Women

Athlete	Event	Round of 64	Round of 32	Round of 16	Quarterfinal	Semifinal	Final / BM	
Athlete	Event	Opposition Score	Opposition Score	Opposition Score	Opposition Score	Opposition Score	Opposition Score	Rank
Olena Koltsova	Individual foil	Olha Leleiko (UKR); W 15–14	Sabine Bau (GER); L 6–15	Did not advance				29
Olha Leleiko	Individual foil	Olena Koltsova (UKR); L 14–15	Did not advance					36
Liudmyla Vasylieva	Individual foil	Migsey Dussu (CUB); L 6–15	Did not advance					34
Liudmyla Vasylieva; Olena Koltsova; Olha Leleiko	Team foil	—		Canada; W 45–35	Italy; L 39–45	Classification semi-final Hungary; L 39–45	7th place final China; L 40–45	8

== Gymnastics ==
Men
Team

Athlete	Event	Qualification								Final							
Athlete	Event	Apparatus						Total	Rank	Apparatus						Total	Rank
Athlete	Event	F	PH	R	V	PB	HB	Total	Rank	F	PH	R	V	PB	HB	Total	Rank
Oleksandr Beresch	Team	9.612	9.775	9.550	9.675	9.650 Q	9.787 Q	58.049	2 Q	—	9.762	9.537	9.687	9.662	9.787	—	
Oleksandr Svitlychniy	Team	9.225	9.712	9.562	9.512	9.575	9.700	57.286	9 Q	—	9.737	—	9.687	9.662	9.675	—	
Valeri Goncharov	Team	—	9.550	9.337	9.537	9.162	9.025	53.987	59	—			9.550	—			
Valery Pereshkura	Team	9.462	—		9.562	9.512	9.700	38.236	67	9.700	—				9.687	—	
Ruslan Mezentsev	Team	9.337	9.700	9.425	—			28.462	87	9.450	9.725	9.550	—				
Roman Zozulya	Team	8.687	9.637	9.650 Q	9.562	8.800	9.587	55.923	32 Q	9.425	9.650	9.650	—	9.500	—		
Total	Team	37.636 (5)	38.824 (1)	38.187 (5)	38.336 (4)	37.899 (6)	38.774 (3)	229.656	3 Q	37.750 (4)	38.811 (2)	38.249 (4)	38.461 (5)	38.261 (4)	38.774 (2)	230.306	

Individual finals

Athlete	Event	Apparatus						Total	Rank
Athlete	Event	F	PH	R	V	PB	HB	Total	Rank
Oleksandr Beresch	Pommel horse	—	9.712	—				9.712	7
Oleksandr Beresch	Horizontal bar	—					9.750	9.750	5
Oleksandr Beresch	All-around	9.675	9.762	9.550	9.675	9.750	9.800	58.212	
Roman Zozulya	Rings	—				9.637	—	9.637	8
Roman Zozulya	All-around	8.812	9.625	9.687	9.162	8.925	9.600	55.811	27
Oleksandr Svitlychniy	All-around	9.600	9.675	9.525	9.725	9.725	9.700	57.950	5

Women
Team

Athlete	Event	Qualification						Final					
Athlete	Event	Apparatus				Total	Rank	Apparatus				Total	Rank
Athlete	Event	V	UB	BB	F	Total	Rank	V	UB	BB	F	Total	Rank
Viktoria Karpenko	Team	9.250	9.787 Q	9.537	9.300	37.874	16 Q	9.343	9.737	9.750	9.550	—	
Tetyana Yarosh	Team	8.818	9.512	9.712 Q	9.275	37.317	29	9.324	9.450	9.550	9.600	—	
Olga Roshchupkina	Team	9.262	9.712 Q	9.625	9.575	38.174	11 Q	9.212	9.687	9.675	—	—	
Halyna Tyryk	Team	8.974	9.650	9.500	9.337	37.461	25 Q	—	9.600	—	8.962	—	
Olha Teslenko	Team	—	9.687	9.650	9.162	28.499	67	—		9.650	9.250	—	
Alona Kvasha	Team	9.581	—			9.581	93	9.306	—				
Total	Team	37.067 (7)	38.836 (3)	38.524 (3)	37.487 (6)	151.914	4 Q	37.185 (5)	38.674 (3)	38.625 (2)	37.362 (5)	151.846	5

Individual finals

Athlete	Event	Apparatus				Total	Rank
Athlete	Event	V	UB	BB	F	Total	Rank
Viktoria Karpenko	All-around	9.574	9.800	9.775	8.725	37.874	11
Viktoria Karpenko	Uneven bars	—	9.775	—		9.775	4
Olga Roshupkina	All-around	9.368	9.725	9.750	9.362	38.205	7
Olga Roshupkina	Uneven bars	—	9.725	—		9.725	6
Halyna Tyryk	All-around	9.181	9.650	9.512	8.987	37.330	22
Tetyana Yarosh	Balance beam	—		9.712	—	9.712	5

== Judo ==
Men

Athlete	Event	Preliminary	Round of 32	Round of 16	Quarterfinals	Semifinals	Repechage 1	Repechage 2	Repechage 3	Final / BM	
Athlete	Event	Opposition Result	Opposition Result	Opposition Result	Opposition Result	Opposition Result	Opposition Result	Opposition Result	Opposition Result	Opposition Result	Rank
Ruslan Mirzaliyev	−60 kg	Cédric Taymans (BEL); L 0000-0100	Did not advance								31
Gennadiy Bilodid	−73 kg	BYE	Hector Lombard (CUB); W 0010-0001	Askhat Shakharov (KAZ); W 1000-0001	Anatoly Laryukov (BLR); L 0010-1000	Did not advance	BYE	Ferrid Kheder (FRA); L 0010-1000	Did not advance		9
Ruslan Mashurenko	−90 kg	BYE	Frédéric Demontfaucon (FRA); L 0000-1000	Did not advance			Carlos Santiago (PUR); W 1000-0001	Eduardo Costa (ARG); W 1000-0000	Fernando González (ESP); W 1000-0000	Keith Morgan (CAN); W 1000-0000	
Valentin Ruslyakov	+100 kg	BYE	Rafał Kubacki (POL); W 0003-0001	Ángel Sánchez (CUB); L 0001-1000	Did not advance						32

Women

Athlete	Event	Round of 32	Round of 16	Quarterfinals	Semifinals	Repechage 1	Repechage 2	Repechage 3	Final / BM	
Athlete	Event	Opposition Result	Opposition Result	Opposition Result	Opposition Result	Opposition Result	Opposition Result	Opposition Result	Opposition Result	Rank
Lyudmyla Lusnikova	−48 kg	Lauren Meece (USA); W 1000–0000	Neşe Şensoy Yıldız (TUR); W 1000–0000	Ryoko Tamura (JPN); L 0000–1000	Did not advance	BYE	Zhao Shunxin (CHN); L 0000–0010	Did not advance		9
Tatyana Belyaeva	−70 kg	Dorjgotovyn Tserenkhand (MGL); L 0000–1000	Did not advance							22
Maryna Prokof'yeva	+78 kg	Sandra Köppen (GER); L 0000–1000	Did not advance			Heba Hefny (EGY); L 0000–1000	Did not advance			13

== Modern pentathlon ==
Athlete	Event	Shooting (10 m air pistol)			Fencing (épée one touch)			Swimming (200 m freestyle)			Riding (show jumping)			Running (3000 m)			Total points	Final rank
Athlete	Event	Points	Rank	MP points	Time	Rank	MP points	Wins	Rank	MP points	Penalties	Rank	MP points	Time	Rank	MP points	Total points	Final rank
Georigi Tchimeris	Men's	183	5	1132	12	10	840	2:05.40	6	1246	148	14	952	9:55.85	20	1018	5188	10
Wadim Tkachuk	Men's	184	3	1144	12	9	840	2:16.20	21	1138	30	4	1070	9:39.86	13	1082	5274	5
Tatiana Nakaznaya	Women's	175	12	1036	11	15	800	2:24.12	9	1159	184	14	916	11:03.87	7	1066	4977	11

== Rhythmic gymnastics ==
Women

Athlete	Event	Qualification						Final					
Athlete	Event	Rope	Hoop	Ball	Ribbon	Total	Rank	Rope	Hoop	Ball	Ribbon	Total	Rank
Olena Vitrichenko	Individual	9.850	9.800	9.866	9.883	39.399	5 Q	9.825	9.883	9.875	9.875	39.408	4
Tamara Yerofeeva	Individual	9.725	9.750	9.716	9.708	38.899	8 Q	9.750	9.750	9.750	9.750	39.000	6

== Rowing ==
Men

Athlete	Event	Heats		Repechage		Semifinals		Final	
Athlete	Event	Time	Rank	Time	Rank	Time	Rank	Time	Rank
Kostyantyn Zaytsev; Kostyantyn Pronenko	Double sculls	6:38.06	3 R	6:33.23	3 SF	6:36.92	5 FB	6:36.92	11
Oleksandr Marchenko; Oleksandr Zaskalko; Oleh Lykov; Leonid Shaposhnykov	Quadruple sculls	5:53.03	2 R	BYE		5:48.15	3 FA	5:55.12	6

Women

Athlete	Event	Heats		Repechage		Semifinals		Final	
Athlete	Event	Time	Rank	Time	Rank	Time	Rank	Time	Rank
Yevheniya Andrieieva; Nina Proskura	Coxless pair	7:30.82	4 R	7:31.11	3 FB	—		7:20.82	8
Olena Ronzhyna; Tetiana Ustiuzhanina; Svitlana Maziy; Dina Miftakhutdynova	Quadruple sculls	6:28.17	2 R	6:29.41	1 FA	BYE		6:25.71	4

== Sailing ==
Men

Athlete	Event	Race											Net points	Final rank
Athlete	Event	1	2	3	4	5	6	7	8	9	10	11	Net points	Final rank
Maksym Oberemko	Mistral	7	23	15	18	~~30~~	16	6	1	~~26~~	20	2	108	14
Yevhen Braslavets; Ihor Matviyenko	470	2	5	~~DSQ~~	~~OCS~~	6	2	4	9	11	DSQ	3	72	6

Women

Athlete	Event	Race											Net points	Final rank
Athlete	Event	1	2	3	4	5	6	7	8	9	10	11	Net points	Final rank
Olha Maslivets	Mistral	17	~~24~~	~~23~~	20	22	20	21	22	22	20	21	185	23
Ruslana Taran; Olena Pakholchik	470	5	7	3	~~13~~	5	1	10	9	~~11~~	5	3	48	

Open

Athlete	Event	Race																		Net points	Final rank
Athlete	Event	1	2	3	4	5	6	7	8	9	10	11	12	13	14	15	16	17	18	Net points	Final rank
Rodion Luka; Georgiy Leonchuk	49er	3	15	~~RET~~	9	14	5	2	~~OCS~~	7	1	13	9	12	9	8	15	—		122	10
Sergiy Pichugin; Volodymyr Korotkov; Sergiy Timokhov	Soling	12	1	7	6	17	12	L	L	L	L	W	Did not advance							—	9

M = Medal race; EL = Eliminated – did not advance into the medal race; CAN = Race cancelled

== Shooting ==
Six Ukrainian shooters (four men and two women) qualified to compete in the following events:

Men

Athlete	Event	Qualification		Final	
Athlete	Event	Points	Rank	Points	Rank
Artur Ayvazyan	10 m air rifle	592	4 Q	692.0	8
Artur Ayvazyan	50 m rifle prone	591	30	Did not advance	
Artur Ayvazyan	50 m rifle 3 positions	1170	5 Q	1266.6	5
Mykola Milchev	Skeet	125	1 Q	150 OR	
Oleg Mykhaylov	10 m air rifle	588	18	Did not advance	
Oleg Mykhaylov	50 m rifle prone	591	30	Did not advance	
Oleg Mykhaylov	50 m rifle 3 positions	1158	22	Did not advance	
Oleksandr Zinenko	10 m running target	569	15	Did not advance	

Women

Athlete	Event	Qualification		Final	
Athlete	Event	Points	Rank	Points	Rank
Natallia Kalnysh	10 m air rifle	390	28	Did not advance	
Natallia Kalnysh	50 m rifle 3 positions	568	29	Did not advance	
Lessia Leskiv	10 m air rifle	392	15	Did not advance	
Lessia Leskiv	50 m rifle 3 positions	579	9	Did not advance	

== Swimming ==
Men

Athlete	Event	Heat		Semifinal		Final	
Athlete	Event	Time	Rank	Time	Rank	Time	Rank
Igor Chervynskyi	400 metre freestyle	03:59.84	33	Did not advance			
Igor Chervynskyi	1500 metre freestyle	15:12.30	8 Q	—		15:08.80	7
Artem Goncharenko	200 metre individual medley	2:05.98	31	Did not advance			
Sergey Fesenko	200 metre butterfly	01:59.41	16 Q	01:59.03	8	Did not advance	
Pavel Khnykin	100 metre freestyle	50.63	27	Did not advance			
Oleh Lisohor	100 metre breaststroke	01:02.24	13 Q	01:02.00	8	Did not advance	
Oleh Lisohor	200 metre breaststroke	02:18.28	28	Did not advance			
Dmytro Nazarenko	400 metre individual medley	4:25.26	28	Did not advance			
Volodymyr Nikolaychuk	100 metre backstroke	56.71	26	Did not advance			
Volodymyr Nikolaychuk	200 metre backstroke	02:01.07 NR	15 Q	2:02.27	7	Did not advance	
Andriy Serdinov	100 metre butterfly	53.90	17	Did not advance			
Igor Snitko	400 metre freestyle	03:52.97	16	Did not advance			
Igor Snitko	1500 metre freestyle	15:14.67	14	Did not advance			
Denys Sylantyev	100 metre butterfly	53.34	8 Q	53.51	5	Did not advance	
Denys Sylantyev	200 metre butterfly	01:56.42	2 Q	01:56.81	1 Q	01:55.76 NR	
Rostyslav Svanidze	200 metre freestyle	1:52.35	24	Did not advance			
Oleksandr Volynets	50 metre freestyle	22.52 NR	9 Q	22.36 NR	5 Q	22.51	8
Vyacheslav Shyrshov; Rostyslav Svadidze; Artem Concharenko; Pavel Khnykin	4 × 100 m freestyle relay	03:21.48	12	Did not advance			
Sergey Fesenko; Igor Snitko; Artem Concharenko; Rostyslav Svanidze	4 × 200 m freestyle relay	07:32.16	14	Did not advance			
Volodymyr Nikolaychuk; Oleh Lisohor; Denys Sylantyev; Vyacheslav Shyrshov	4 × 100 m medley relay	03:41.05	11	Did not advance			

Women

Athlete	Event	Heat		Semifinal		Final	
Athlete	Event	Time	Rank	Time	Rank	Time	Rank
Olga Beresnyeva	800 metre freestyle	09:00.12	23	Did not advance			
Nadiya Beshevli	100 metre backstroke	01:04.66	27	Did not advance			
Nadiya Beshevli	200 metre backstroke	02:15.86	17	Did not advance			
Svitlana Bondarenko	100 metre breaststroke	01:09.60	11 Q	01:09.84	7	Did not advance	
Yana Klochkova	800 metre freestyle	08:29.84 NR	2 Q	—		08:22.66 NR	
Yana Klochkova	200 metre individual medley	02:13.83	3 Q	02:13.08	1 Q	02:10.68 OR	
Yana Klochkova	400 metre individual medley	04:37.64 NR	1 Q	—		04:33.59 WR	
Olena Lapunova	200 metre freestyle	02:04.39	26	Did not advance			
Olena Lapunova	400 metre freestyle	04:19.96	32	Did not advance			
Zhanna Lozumyrska	200 metre butterfly	02:14.47	24	Did not advance			
Olga Mukomol	50 metre freestyle	25.67	11 Q	25.88	7	Did not advance	
Olga Mukomol	100 metre freestyle	56.59	18	Did not advance			
Inna Nikitina	200 metre breaststroke	2:34.20	26	Did not advance			
Mariya Ogurtsova	100 metre butterfly	01:03.00	38	Did not advance			
Nadiya Beshevli; Olena Lapunova; Olga Mukomol; Valentyna Tregub	4 × 100 m freestyle relay	03:49.11	13	Did not advance			
Nadiya Beshevli; Al'bina Bordunova; Olena Lapunova; Zhanna Lozumyrska	4 × 200 m freestyle relay	DSQ		Did not advance			
Nadiya Beshevli; Svitlana Bondarenko; Olena Grytsyuk; Valentyna Tregub	4 × 100 m medley relay	04:15.64	16	Did not advance			

== Synchronized swimming ==
Women

Athlete	Event	Qualification				Final			
Athlete	Event	Technical	Free	Total	Rank	Technical	Free	Total	Rank
Iryna Rudnytska; Olesya Zaytseva	Duet	30.987	58.196	89.183	14	Did not advance			

== Table tennis ==
Women

Athlete	Event	Group round		Round of 32	Round of 16	Quarterfinals	Semifinals	Bronze medal	Final
Athlete	Event	Opposition Result	Rank	Opposition Result	Opposition Result	Opposition Result	Opposition Result	Opposition Result	Rank
Olena Kovtun	Women's singles	Group K Chen-Tong Fei-Ming (TPE); L 0 – 3 Fabiola Ramos (VEN); W 3 – 0	2	Did not advance					

== Tennis ==
Ukraine nominated two female tennis players to compete in the tournament.

Women

Athlete	Event	Round of 32	Round of 16	Quarterfinals	Semifinals	Final / BM	
Athlete	Event	Opposition Score	Opposition Score	Opposition Score	Opposition Score	Opposition Score	Rank
Elena Tatarkova; Anna Zaporozhanova	Women's doubles	Lee / Weng (TPE); W 6–3, 7–6 (6–4)	Halard-Decugis / Mauresmo (FRA); L 2–6, 4–6	Did not advance			

== Trampolining ==
Athlete	Event	Qualification									Final			
Athlete	Event	Execution	Points	Rank	Execution	Difficulty	Points	Rank	Total	Rank	Execution	Difficulty	Total	Rank
Olexander Chernonos	Men's Individual	28.0	28.0	5	24.6	13.2	37.8	8	65.8	8 Q	4.50	3.00	7.50	8
Oxana Tsyhuleva	Women's Individual	27.6	27.6	5	37.5	26.7	10.8	1	65.1	3 Q	25.80	11.90	37.70	

== Triathlon ==
Men

Athlete	Event	Swim (1.5 km)	Trans 1	Bike (40 km)	Trans 2	Run (10 km)	Total Time	Rank
Andriy Glushchenko	Men's	18:09.79	14	59:29.90	39	31:50.48	1:49:30.17	11
Volodymyr Polikarpenko	Men's	17:59.89	6	59:37.20	37	32:14.69	1:49:51.78	15

== Weightlifting ==
Men

Athlete	Event	Snatch		Clean & jerk		Total	Rank
Athlete	Event	Result	Rank	Result	Rank	Total	Rank
Oleksandr Likhvald	– 56 kg	120.0	9	150.0	8	270.0	9
Dmytro Hnidenko	– 77 kg	160.0	8	190.0	9	350.0	8
Ruslan Savchenko	– 77 kg	157.5	10	180.0	13	337.5	11
Andriy Demchuk	– 94 kg	170.0	14	207.5	10	377.5	11
Ihor Razoronov	– 105 kg	192.5	1	227.5	4	420.0	4
Denys Hotfrid	– 105 kg	190.0	2	NM	DNF	NM	DNF
Hennadiy Krasylnykov	+ 105 kg	190.0	10	230.0	8	420.0	9
Artem Udachyn	+ 105 kg	195.0	7	220.0	12	415.0	11

Women

Athlete	Event	Snatch		Clean & jerk		Total	Rank
Athlete	Event	Result	Rank	Result	Rank	Total	Rank
Nataliya Skakun	– 58 kg	85.0	10	112.5	6	197.5	7
Vita Rudenok	+ 75 kg	115.0	5	NM	DNS	NM	DNF

== Wrestling ==
Men's freestyle

Athlete	Event	Elimination Pool				Quarterfinal	Semifinal	Final / BM	
Athlete	Event	Opposition Result	Opposition Result	Opposition Result	Rank	Opposition Result	Opposition Result	Opposition Result	Rank
Oleksandr Zakharuk	−54 kg	Chuchunov (RUS); W 3–0	Tsonov (BUL); W 10–0	—	1 Q	Henson (USA); L 4–8	BYE	Mamyrov (KAZ); W 8–1	5
Yevhen Buslovych	−58 kg	Berberyan (ARM); W 5–1	Abdullayev (AZE); W 7–5	Kuhner (GER); W 4–1	1 Q	BYE	Zakhartdinov (UZB); W 2–0	Dabir (IRN); L 0–3	
Elbrus Tedeyev	−63 kg	Yong-son (PRK); W 6–4	Umakhanov (RUS); L 3–13	—	2	Did not advance			11
Zaza Zazirov	−69 kg	Wada (JPN); W 3–2	Diaconu (MDA); L 3–5	—	2	Did not advance			11
Alik Muzayev	−76 kg	Eui-jae (KOR); L 1–5	Jurecki (POL); W 3–1	Ozoline (AUS); W 16–3	2	Did not advance			6
Davyd Bichinashvili	−85 kg	Ibragimov (MKD); L 1–1	Kawai (JPN); W 7–1	—	2	Did not advance			12
Vadim Tasoyev	−97 kg	Murtazaliev (RUS); L 0–4	Douglas (USA); W 5–1	—	2	Did not advance			11
Mirabi Valiyev	−130 kg	McCoy (USA); L 0–3	Ashabaliyev (AZE); L 0–4	—	3	Did not advance			18

Men's Greco-Roman

Athlete	Event	Elimination Pool				Quarterfinal	Semifinal	Final / BM	
Athlete	Event	Opposition Result	Opposition Result	Opposition Result	Rank	Opposition Result	Opposition Result	Opposition Result	Rank
Andriy Kalashnykov	−54 kg	Elela (EGY); W 16–2	Mays (USA); W 11–0	Kalilov (KGZ); W 3–0	1 Q	BYE	Rivas (CUB); L 0–11	Kang (PRK); L 0–7	4
Oleksandr Stepanyan	−58 kg	Sheng (CHN); L 0–10	Ainaoui (FRA); L 6–7	—	3	Did not advance			16
Hryhoriy Komyshenko	−63 kg	Amani (NZL); W 10–0	Motzer (SUI); L 1–3	Motoki (JPN); W 3–1	2	Did not advance			8
Rustam Adzhi	−69 kg	Kopytov (BLR); W 3–0	Wolny (POL); L 1–7	Glushkov (RUS); L 4–5	3	Did not advance			8
David Manukyan	−76 kg	Makaranka (BLR); W 12–1	Iutana (SAM); W 15–0	Michalkiewicz (POL); W 8–2	1 Q	BYE	Lindland (USA); L 4–7	Yli-Hannuksela (FIN); L 2–4	4
Vyacheslav Oliynyk	−85 kg	Menshikov (RUS); L 0–2	Tsilent (USA); W 6–1	—	3	Did not advance			14
Davyd Saldadze	−97 kg	Fkiri (TUN); W 9–0	Ežerskis (LTU); W 2–0	Lishtvan (BLR); W 5–2	1 Q	BYE	Thanos (GRE); W 4–2	Ljungberg (SWE); L 1–2	
Georgiy Saldadze	−130 kg	Barreno (VEN); W 9–0	Kovacs (AUS); W 6–0	—	1 Q	Karelin (RUS); L 1–2	—	Milián (CUB); L 3–5	6

== Notes ==
- Wallechinsky, David (2004). The Complete Book of the Summer Olympics (Athens 2004 Edition). Toronto, Canada. ISBN 1-894963-32-6.
- International Olympic Committee (2001). The Results Archived 18 September 2002 at the Australian Web Archive. Retrieved 12 November 2005.
- Sydney Organising Committee for the Olympic Games (2001). Official Report of the XXVII Olympiad Volume 1: Preparing for the Games Archived 9 November 2000 at the Wayback Machine. Retrieved 20 November 2005.
- Sydney Organising Committee for the Olympic Games (2001). Official Report of the XXVII Olympiad Volume 2: Celebrating the Games Archived 31 July 2012 at the Wayback Machine. Retrieved 20 November 2005.
- Sydney Organising Committee for the Olympic Games (2001). The Results Archived 27 September 2007 at the Wayback Machine. Retrieved 20 November 2005.
- International Olympic Committee Web Site
