= Archery at the 2000 Summer Olympics – Men's team =

Archery at the Olympics

Men's team at the Games of the XXVII Olympiad
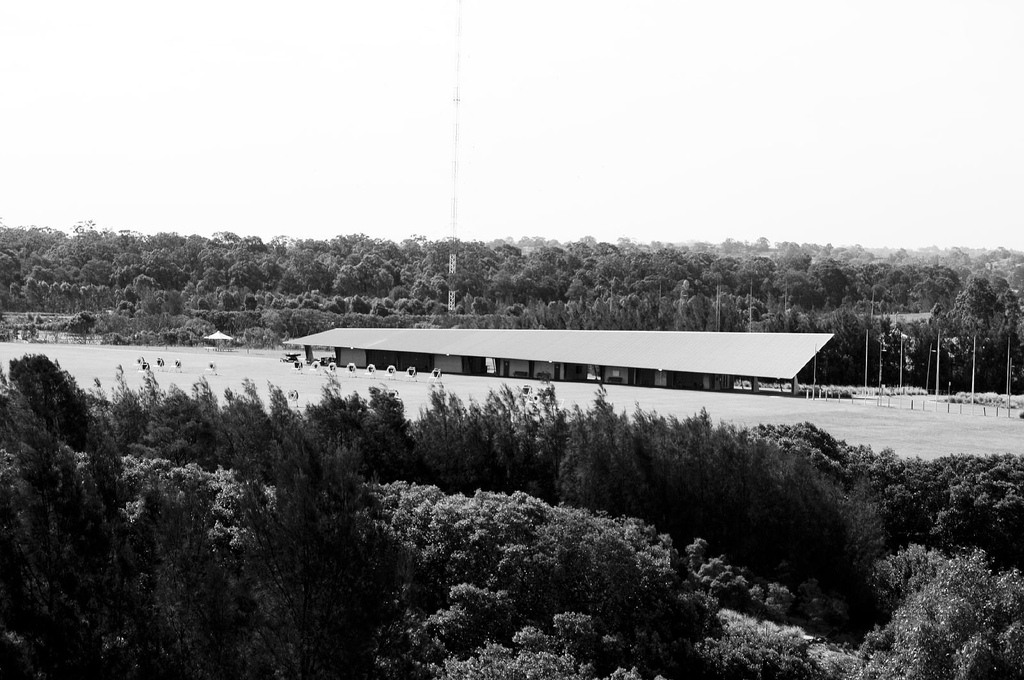
- The Sydney International Archery Park, where the event took place
- Venue: Sydney International Archery Park
- Date: 16–22 September 2000
- Competitors: 42 from 14 nations

Medalists
1st place, gold medalist(s)		Jang Yong-Ho; Kim Chung-tae; Oh Kyo-Moon	South Korea
2nd place, silver medalist(s)		Matteo Bisiani; Ilario Di Buò; Michele Frangilli	Italy
3rd place, bronze medalist(s)		Butch Johnson; Rod White; Vic Wunderle	United States

The men's team was an archery event held as part of the archery at the 2000 Summer Olympics programme.

A total of 14 teams competed in the third appearance of the Olympic team round archery event. The ranking round, which determined the seeds for all teams, doubled as the ranking round for the individual competition and was held on 16 September 2000. Each archer shot 72 arrows, and the scores of the three archers for each team were summed to give a team ranking round score. A single-elimination head-to-head tournament was held on 22 September. During each round of competition, each archer shot nine arrows for a team score based on 27 arrows. The losers of the semifinals faced off in a bronze medal match, while teams defeated before then were assigned rankings within the group of other teams defeated in their round based on their score in that round.

The South Korean team, which had swept the top three places in the ranking round but had seen each of its members suffer upsets in the individual knock-out rounds, won by comfortable margins in the team knock-out rounds to take the gold medal. The trio set a new world record for a 27-arrow team match in the quarterfinals, with a score of 258 of a possible 270. Italy and Russia each managed to defeat two higher-seeded teams before falling to the Koreans; this gave Italy the silver medal and put Russia in the bronze medal match against the United States. The Russians forced the first Olympic team match tiebreaker against the Americans in that match, losing 29-26 in that tiebreaker.

== Ranking round ==
The ranking for the men's teams was determined by summing the ranking round scores of the three members.

Rank	Nation	Archer	Score
1	South Korea	Jang Yong-Ho; Kim Chung-tae; Oh Kyo-Moon	1980
2	United States	Butch Johnson; Rod White; Vic Wunderle	1921
3	Kazakhstan	Aleksandr Li; Vadim Shikarev; Stanislav Zabrodsky	1916
4	Turkey	Özdemir Akbal; Hasan Orbay; Serdar Şatır	1899
5	Netherlands	Wietse van Alten; Fred van Zutphen; Henk Vogels	1899
6	Italy	Matteo Bisiani; Ilario Di Buò; Michele Frangilli	1895
7	Sweden	Mattias Eriksson; Niklas Eriksson; Magnus Petersson	1891
8	China	Fu Shengjun; Tang Hua; Yang Bo	1886
9	Ukraine	Serhiy Antonov; Viktor Kurchenko; Ihor Parkhomenko	1878
10	Australia	Simon Fairweather; Matthew Gray; Scott Hunter-Russell	1876
11	France	Sébastien Flute; Jocelyn de Grandis; Lionel Torres	1874
12	Russia	Bair Badënov; Yuri Leontiev; Balzhinima Tsyrempilov	1870
13	Japan	Yuji Hamano; Masafumi Makiyama; Takayoshi Matsushita	1841
14	Norway	Martinus Grov; Lars Erik Humlekjær; Bård Nesteng	1839

== Knockout stage ==
Round of 16
9	Ukraine	244
8	China	235
12	Russia	248
5	Netherlands	241
4	Turkey	253
13	Japan	231
3	Kazakhstan	246
14	Norway	241
6	Italy	250
11	France	239
7	Sweden	241
10	Australia	238

Quarterfinals
1	South Korea	258
9	Ukraine	236
12	Russia	247
4	Turkey	245
3	Kazakhstan	244
6	Italy	249
7	Sweden	244
2	United States	255

Semifinals
1	South Korea	240
12	Russia	229
6	Italy	244
2	United States	241

Final
1	South Korea	255
6	Italy	247
Bronze medal match
2	United States	239^{29}
12	Russia	239^{26}

In the first team round tie-breaker in Olympic archery history, the United States won the bronze medal, defeating Russia by shooting a near-perfect 29 to the Russians' 26.

== Sources ==
- Official Report
- Wudarski, Pawel (1999). "Wyniki Igrzysk Olimpijskich" (in Polish). Archived from the original on 18 January 2008.
