= 2004 European Indoor Archery Championships =

2004 European Indoor Championships
- Location: Sassari, Italy
- Dates: 15–21 March 2004

The 2004 European Indoor Archery Championships was the 10th edition of the European Indoor Archery Championships. The event was held in Sassari, Italy from 15 to 21 March 2004.

== Medal table ==
* Host nation (Italy)

Rank	Nation	Gold	Silver	Bronze	Total
1	France	3	1	0	4
2	Russia	2	0	3	5
3	Italy*	1	4	1	6
4	Netherlands	1	0	1	2
5	Ukraine	1	0	0	1
6	Belgium	0	1	0	1
6	Croatia	0	1	0	1
6	Germany	0	1	0	1
9	Great Britain	0	0	2	2
10	Georgia	0	0	1	1
Totals (10 entries)		8	8	8	24

== Medal summary ==
=== Recurve ===
Event	Gold	Silver	Bronze
Men's individual	Jocelyn de Grandis; France	Michele Frangilli; Italy	Balzhinima Tsyrempilov; Russia
Women's individual	Anna Puttseva; Russia	Natalia Valeeva; Italy	Elena Dostay; Russia
Men's team	Ukraine; Dmytro Hrachov; Oleksandr Serdiuk; Ihor Parkhomenko	Italy; Michele Frangilli; Marco Galiazzo; Ilario Di Buò	Russia; Balzhinima Tsyrempilov; Bulat Badmaslov; Andrey Abramov
Women's team	Russia; Anna Puttseva; Gerelma Erdyniyeva; Elena Dostay	Germany; Karina Winter; Wiebke Nulle; Susanne Poßner	Georgia; Kristine Esebua; Khatuna Phutkaradze; Olga Ladigina

=== Compound ===
Event	Gold	Silver	Bronze
Men's individual	Peter Elzinga; Netherlands	Stefano Mazzi; Italy	Christopher White; Great Britain
Women's individual	Sandrine Vandionant-Frangilli; France	Ivana Buden; Croatia	Nichola Simpson; Great Britain
Men's team	Italy; Stefano Mazzi; Vincenzo Ciampolillo; Marco Del Ministro	France; Jean-Marc Beaud; Dominique Genet; Jérôme Delplace	Netherlands; Peter Elzinga; Roel Wieser; Fred van Zutphen
Women's team	France; Sandrine Vandionant-Frangilli; Valérie Fabre; Peggy Braem	Belgium; Gladys Willems; Yolande Anris; Noella Verhoeven	Italy; Eugenia Salvi; Giorgia Solato; Assunta Atorino
