= Finland at the 2000 Summer Olympics =

- IOC code: FIN
- NOC: Finnish Olympic Committee
- Website: sport.fi/olympiakomitea (in Finnish and Swedish)

in Sydney
- Competitors: 70 (40 men and 30 women) in 16 sports
- Flag bearer: Olli-Pekka Karjalainen
- Medals Ranked 31st: Gold 2 Silver 1 Bronze 1 Total 4

Summer Olympics appearances (overview)
- 1908; 1912; 1920; 1924; 1928; 1932; 1936; 1948; 1952; 1956; 1960; 1964; 1968; 1972; 1976; 1980; 1984; 1988; 1992; 1996; 2000; 2004; 2008; 2012; 2016; 2020; 2024

Other related appearances
- 1906 Intercalated Games

Finland competed at the 2000 Summer Olympics in Sydney, Australia.

== Medalist ==
Medal	Name	Sport	Event	Date
Gold	Arsi Harju	Athletics	Men's Shot Put	September 22
Gold	Jyrki Järvi; Thomas Johanson	Sailing	Open 49er	September 25
Silver	Juha Hirvi	Shooting	Men's 50 metre rifle three positions	September 23
Bronze	Marko Yli-Hannuksela	Wrestling	Men's Greco-Roman 76 kg	September 26

== Archery ==
The Finnish archery squad in Sydney consisted of two men and one woman. None of the archers won a match.

Athlete	Event	Ranking round		Round of 64	Round of 32	Round of 16	Quarterfinal	Semifinal	Final / BM	
Athlete	Event	Score	Seed	Opposition Result	Opposition Result	Opposition Result	Opposition Result	Opposition Result	Opposition Result	Rank
Jari Lipponen	Men's Individual	622	36	van Zutphen (NED); L 155–161	Did not advance					
Miika Aulio	Men's Individual	603	53	van Alten (NED); L 160–163	Did not advance					
Katri Suutari	Women's Individual	608	58	Choe (PRK); L 149–161	Did not advance					

== Athletics ==
Men
Track and road events

Men's 100 m

- Tommi Hartonen
  - Round 1 – 10.53 (→ did not advance)

Men's 200 m

- Tommi Hartonen
  - Round 1 – 20.82
  - Round 2 – 20.47 NR
  - Semifinal – 20.88 (→ did not advance)

Men's 50 km Walk

- Valentin Kononen
  - Final – DSQ

Field events

Men's Shot Put

- Arsi Harju
  - Qualifying – 21.39
  - Final – 21.29 (→ Gold Medal)
- Timo Aaltonen
  - Qualifying – 20.04
  - Final – 18.64 (→ 12th place)
- Ville Tiisanoja
  - Qualifying – 19.66 (→ did not advance)

Men's Javelin Throw

- Aki Parviainen
  - Qualifying – 83.73
  - Final – 86.62 (→ 5th place)
- Harri Haatainen
  - Qualifying – 79.93 (→ did not advance)
- Harri Hakkarainen
  - Qualifying – DNF (→ did not advance, no ranking)

Men's Hammer Throw

- Olli-Pekka Karjalainen
  - Qualifying – 69.64 (→ did not advance)

Men's High Jump

- Toni Huikuri
  - Qualifying – 2.20 (→ did not advance)
- Mika Polku
  - Qualifying – 2.24 (→ did not advance)

Combined – Decathlon

- Eduard Hämäläinen
  - 100 m – 11.01
  - Long Jump – 7.19
  - Shot Put – 14.06
  - High Jump – 1.85
  - 400 m – 48.14
  - 100 m Hurdles – 14.37
  - Discus Throw – 35.98
  - Pole Vault – 4.80
  - Javelin Throw – 47.11
  - 1,500 m – 04:54.18
  - Points – 7520.00 (→ 24th place)
- Aki Heikkinen
  - 100 m – 11.15
  - Long Jump – NM
  - Shot Put – 13.37
  - High Jump – DNS

Women
Track

Women's 100 m

- Heidi Hannula
  - Round 1 – 11.68 (→ did not advance)

Women's 200 m

- Johanna Manninen
  - Round 1 – 23.40
  - Round 2 – 23.41 (→ did not advance)

Women's 100 m Hurdles

- Manuela Bosco
  - Round 1 – 13.51 (→ did not advance)

Women's 4 × 100 m

- Manuela Bosco, Heidi Hannula, Sanna Kyllönen, Johanna Manninen
  - Round 1 – 43.66
  - Semifinal – 43.50 (→ did not advance)

Field events

Women's Javelin Throw

- Mikaela Ingberg
  - Qualifying – 60.85
  - Final – 58.56 (→ 9th place)
- Taina Uppa
  - Qualifying – 57.39 (→ did not advance)

Women's Hammer Throw

- Mia Strömmer
  - Qualifying – 59.43 (→ did not advance)
- Sini Pöyry
  - Qualifying – 63.80
  - Final – 62.49 (→ 12th place)

Combined – Heptathlon

Women's Heptathlon

- Tiia Hautala
  - 100 m Hurdles – 13.62
  - High Jump – 1.78
  - Shot Put – 13.31
  - 200 m – 25.00
  - Long Jump – 6.12
  - Javelin Throw – 45.40
  - 800 m – 02:14.90
  - Points – 6173 (→ 8th place)
- Susanna Rajamäki
  - 100 m Hurdles – 13.60
  - High Jump – 1.66
  - Shot Put – 13.87
  - 200 m – 24.03
  - Long Jump – 6.36
  - Javelin Throw – 37.00
  - 800 m – 02:18.47
  - Points – 6021 (→ 13th place)

== Badminton ==
Men's Singles

- Jyri Aalto
  - Round of 64: Bye
  - Round of 32: Lost to Wong Choong Hann of Malaysia

Women's Singles

- Anu Weckström
  - Round of 64: Bye
  - Round of 32: Lost to Kanako Yonekura of Japan

== Boxing ==
Men's Featherweight (– 57 kg)

- Joni Turunen
  - Round 1 – Lost to Falk Huste of Germany (→ did not advance)

== Canoeing ==
=== Flatwater ===
Men's Kayak Singles 500 m

- Kimmo Latvamäki
  - Qualifying Heat – 01:42.535
  - Semifinal – 01:41.640 (→ did not advance)

== Cycling ==
=== Road ===
Women's Road Race

- Pia Sundstedt
  - Final – 3:06:31 (→ 21st place)

=== Track ===
Women's Sprint

- Mira Kasslin
  - Qualifying – 12.194
  - 1/8 Finals – Lost to Félicia Ballanger of France (→ did not advance)
  - 1/8 Finals Repechage – Heat 1; 3rd place
  - Final 9-12 – (→ 11th place)

Women's 500 m Time Trial

- Mira Kasslin
  - Final – 37.145 (→ 17th place)

== Diving ==
Men's 3 Metre Springboard

- Jukka Piekkanen
  - Preliminary – 373.41 (→ 20th place, did not advance)

Men's 3 Metre Springboard

- Joona Puhakka
  - Preliminary – 332.58 (→ 30th place, did not advance)

== Sailing ==
Eight men and two women competed for Finland in the Sailing competition. They won one gold medal.

Men's Double Handed Dinghy (470)

- Petri Leskinen and Kristian Heinilä
  - Race 1 – (25)
  - Race 2 – 23
  - Race 3 – 10
  - Race 4 – 3
  - Race 5 – 17
  - Race 6 – 4
  - Race 7 – 23
  - Race 8 – 20
  - Race 9 – (28)
  - Race 10 – 3
  - Race 11 – 24
  - Final – 127 (→ 16th place)

Men's Laser

- Roope Suomalainen
  - Race 1 – (44) DSQ
  - Race 2 – 13
  - Race 3 – 5
  - Race 4 – 16
  - Race 5 – 18
  - Race 6 – 3
  - Race 7 – 14
  - Race 8 – 23
  - Race 9 – (25)
  - Race 10 – 19
  - Race 11 – 16
  - Final – 127 (→ 17th place)

Men's Three Handed Keelboat (Soling)

- Erkki Heinonen, Jali Makilä and Sami Tamminen
  - Did not advance to round robin.

Women's Mistral

- Minna Aalto
  - Race 1 – 9
  - Race 2 – 18
  - Race 3 – 20
  - Race 4 – 12
  - Race 5 – (21)
  - Race 6 – 7
  - Race 7 – 15
  - Race 8 – 12
  - Race 9 – 17
  - Race 10 – 11
  - Race 11 – (30) DSQ
  - Final – 121 (→ 15th place)

Women's Single Handed Dinghy (Europe)

- Sari Multala
  - Race 1 – 2
  - Race 2 – 7
  - Race 3 – (16)
  - Race 4 – 12
  - Race 5 – (20)
  - Race 6 – 12
  - Race 7 – 9
  - Race 8 – 4
  - Race 9 – 7
  - Race 10 – 2
  - Race 11 – 6
  - Final – 61 (→ 5th place)

Mixed High Performance Two Handed Dinghy (49er)

- Thomas Johanson and Jyrki Järvi
  - Race 1 – 2
  - Race 2 – 7
  - Race 3 – 2
  - Race 4 – (12)
  - Race 5 – 3
  - Race 6 – 4
  - Race 7 – 10
  - Race 8 – 6
  - Race 9 – 2
  - Race 10 – 4
  - Race 11 – 7
  - Race 12 – 2
  - Race 13 – 3
  - Race 14 – 1
  - Race 15 – 2
  - Race 16 – (13)
  - Final – 55 (→ Gold Medal)

== Swimming ==
Men's 100 m Freestyle

- Jere Hård
  - Preliminary Heat – 51.11 (→ did not advance)

Men's 100 m Butterfly

- Jere Hård
  - Preliminary Heat – 53.67
  - Semi-final – 53.65 (→ did not advance)
- Tero Välimaa
  - Preliminary Heat – 54.24 (→ did not advance)

Men's 200 m Butterfly

- Tero Välimaa
  - Preliminary Heat – 02:02.46 (→ did not advance)

Men's 100 m Breaststroke

- Jarno Pihlava
  - Preliminary Heat – 01:02.21 (→ did not advance)

Men's 200 m Breaststroke

- Jarno Pihlava
  - Preliminary Heat – 02:19.76 (→ did not advance)

Men's 200 m Individual Medley

- Jani Sievinen
  - Preliminary Heat – 02:02.00
  - Semi-final – 02:01.46
  - Final – 02:02.49 (→ 8th place)

Men's 400 m Individual Medley

- Jani Sievinen
  - Preliminary Heat – 04:25.16 (→ did not advance)

Men's 4 × 100 m Medley

- Jani Sievinen, Jarno Pihlava, Tero Välimaa, and Jere Hård
  - Preliminary Heat – DSQ (→ did not advance)

Women's 50 m Freestyle

- Hanna-Maria Seppälä
  - Preliminary Heat – 26.21 (→ did not advance)

Women's 100 m Freestyle

- Hanna-Maria Seppälä
  - Preliminary Heat – 56.68 (→ did not advance)

Women's 100 m Butterfly

- Marja Pärssinen
  - Preliminary Heat – 01:01.94 (→ did not advance)

Women's 100 m Backstroke

- Anu Koivisto
  - Preliminary Heat – 01:03.44 (→ did not advance)

Women's 200 m Backstroke

- Anu Koivisto
  - Preliminary Heat – 02:16.23 (→ did not advance)

== Weightlifting ==
Athlete	Event	Snatch			Clean & Jerk			Total	Rank
Athlete	Event	1	2	3	1	2	3	Total	Rank
Karoliina Lundahl	Women's 75 kg	~~102.5~~	~~102.5~~	~~102.5~~	—	—	—	Did not finish	
