= Orbay =

Orbay is a surname. Notable people with the surname include:

- Hasan Orbay (born 1979), Turkish archer
- Kazım Orbay (1887–1964), Turkish general and senator
- Rauf Orbay (1881–1964), Turkish naval officer and statesman
