= Kim Chung-tae =

Kim Chung-tae may refer to:

- Kim Chung-tae (archer)
- Kim Chung-tae (gymnast)
