= Oleksandr Skrypnyk =

Oleksandr Skrypnyk may refer to:

- Oleksandr Skrypnyk (footballer)
- Oleksandr Skrypnyk (diver)
