= Alexandr Li =

Kazakhstani archer (born 1974)

Personal information
- Nationality: Kazakhstani
- Born: 17 January 1974 (age 52)

Sport
- Sport: Archery

Alexandr Li (Александр Джоржиевич Ли, born 17 January 1974) is a Kazakhstani archer. He competed in the men's individual and team events at the 2000 Summer Olympics.
