= Artem Honcharenko =

Ukrainian swimmer (born 1979)

Personal information
- Full name: Artem Honcharenko
- National team: Ukraine
- Born: 21 March 1979 (age 47) Kharkiv, Ukrainian SSR, Soviet Union
- Height: 1.94 m (6 ft 4 1/2 in)
- Weight: 82 kg (181 lb)

Sport
- Sport: Swimming
- Strokes: Freestyle, medley
Medal record
Men's swimming
Representing Ukraine
Summer Universiade
Silver medal – second place	1999 Mallorca	4 x 200 m freestyle

Artem Honcharenko (Ukrainian: Артем Гончаренко; born March 21, 1979) is a Ukrainian former swimmer, who specialized in freestyle and in individual medley events. Honcharenko competed in three swimming events at the 2000 Summer Olympics in Sydney. He eclipsed a FINA B-cut of 2:04.30 (200 m individual medley) from the Belarus Championships in Minsk. On the first day of the Games, Honcharenko teamed up with Vyacheslav Shyrshov, Pavlo Khnykin, and the late Rostyslav Svanidze in the 4×100 m freestyle relay. Honcharenko swam the third leg in heat three and recorded a split of 49.98, but the Ukrainians settled only for fourth place and twelfth overall with a final time of 3:21.48. Three days later, Honcharenko, along with Svanidze, Ihor Snitko, and Serhiy Fesenko, placed fourteenth in the 4×200 m freestyle relay with a time of 7:32.16. In his final event, 200 m individual medley, Honcharenko placed thirty-first on the morning prelims. Swimming in heat four, he pulled off a fifth-place effort with a much faster freestyle leg in 2:05.98, a 1.68-second deficit off his entry time.
