= Khatuna Narimanidze =

Georgian archer (born 1974)

Personal information
- Born: 2 February 1974 (age 52) Tbilisi, Georgia
- Height: 172 cm (5 ft 8 in)
- Weight: 85 kg (187 lb)
Medal record
Women's recurve archery
Representing Georgia
World Indoor Championships
Bronze medal – third place	2016 Ankara	Team
European Indoor Championships
Gold medal – first place	2011 Cambrils	Team
Silver medal – second place	2002 Ankara	Team
Silver medal – second place	2015 Koper	Individual
Silver medal – second place	2015 Koper	Team
Silver medal – second place	2019 Samsun	Team
Bronze medal – third place	2004 Sassari	Team
Bronze medal – third place	2010 Poreč	Team
European Championships
Silver medal – second place	2016 Nottingham	Team
European Games
Silver medal – second place	2015 Baku	Mixed team

Khatuna Narimanidze (Georgian: ხათუნა ნარიმანიძე; born 2 February 1974) is an athlete from Georgia. She competes in archery.

== 2004 Summer Olympics ==
Narimanidze represented Georgia at the 2004 Summer Olympics. She placed 41st in the women's individual ranking round with a 72-arrow score of 620. In the first round of elimination, she faced 24th-ranked Almudena Gallardo of Spain. Narimanidze lost 148–132 in the 18-arrow match, placing 51st overall in women's individual archery.

== 2008 Summer Olympics ==
At the 2008 Summer Olympics in Beijing Narimanidze finished her ranking round with a total of 663 points. This gave her the 4th seed (the first non South Korean) for the final competition bracket in which she faced Dorji Dema in the first round, beating the archer from Bhutan with 107–97. In the second round she was too strong for Leydis Brito from Venezuela with 111–98, but in the third round she was eliminated by 20th seed Mariana Avitia with 109–108.

== 2016 Summer Olympics ==
Narimanidze represented Georgia at the 2016 Summer Olympics in Rio de Janeiro.
