= Heidi Earp =

English swimmer (born 1980)

Personal information
- Full name: Heidi Earp
- National team: Great Britain
- Born: 20 December 1980 (age 45) Stoke-on-Trent, England
- Height: 1.70 m (5 ft 7 in)
- Weight: 57 kg (126 lb; 9.0 st)

Sport
- Sport: Swimming
- Strokes: Breaststroke
- Club: Nova Centurion Swim Club
- Coach: Bill Furniss
Medal record
Women's swimming
Representing Great Britain
European Championships (SC)
Bronze medal – third place	2000 Valencia	4×50 m medley
Bronze medal – third place	2001 Antwerp	100 m breaststroke

Heidi Earp (born 20 December 1980) is a female English former competitive swimmer who represented Great Britain in the Olympic Games and the European championships, and for England in the Commonwealth Games.

== Swimming career ==
Earp specialized in breaststroke events. She swam for the British squad at the 2000 Summer Olympics, and later earned two bronze medals at the European Short Course Championships (2000 and 2001). During her sporting career, she trained for the Nova Centurion Swim Club in Nottingham under her longtime coach and mentor Bill Furniss.

Earp competed only in two swimming events at the 2000 Summer Olympics in Sydney, Australia. She broke one of Britain's oldest records from the Olympic Trials in Sheffield, finishing in a FINA A-standard of 1:09.92. On the second day of the Games, Earp placed twentieth in the 100 m breaststroke. Swimming in heat five, she came from behind the pack to edge out Poland's Alicja Pęczak on the final stretch and pick up a seventh seed in a time of 1:10.56, but missed the semifinals by almost a tenth of a second (0.10). Earp also teamed up with Katy Sexton, Sue Rolph, and Karen Pickering in the 4 × 100 m medley relay. Swimming the breaststroke leg, Earp recorded a split of 1:10.25, but the Brits settled only for seventh place in the final with a record-breaking time of 4:07.61.

Shortly after the Games, Earp, along with Sarah Price, Alison Sheppard, and non-Olympian Rosalind Brett, shattered a British record of 1:51.20 to take home the bronze in the 4×50 m medley relay at the 2000 European Short Course Swimming Championships in Valencia, Spain. The following year, she added a second bronze to her career hardware in the 100 m breaststroke from the 2001 European Short Course Swimming Championships in Antwerp, Belgium.

At the 2002 Commonwealth Games in Manchester, England, Earp failed to collect a single medal for the English team in the 200 m breaststroke, finishing off the podium at 2:30.45. In 2003, Earp announced her retirement from swimming to pursue a further career in medicine.

At the ASA National British Championships she won the 100 metres breaststroke title in 2000 and the 200 metres breaststroke title in 2000.
