= Rostyslav Svanidze =

Ukrainian swimmer (1971–2002)

Personal information
- Full name: Rostyslav Albertovych Svanidze
- National team: Ukraine
- Born: 5 November 1971 Tbilisi, Georgian SSR, Soviet Union
- Died: 14 October 2002 (aged 30) Zaporizhia, Ukraine
- Height: 1.94 m (6 ft 4 in)
- Weight: 85 kg (187 lb)

Sport
- Sport: Swimming
- Strokes: Freestyle
- Club: Ukraïna Zaporizhzhia
- Coach: Ivan Proskura
Medal record
Men's swimming
Representing Ukraine
Summer Universiade
Silver medal – second place	1999 Mallorca	4 x 200 m freestyle

Rostyslav Albertovych Svanidze (Ukrainian: Ростислав Альбертович Сванідзе; November 5, 1971 – October 14, 2002) was a Ukrainian swimmer of Georgian descent, who specialized in middle-distance freestyle events. He was a two-time Olympian (1996 and 2000), and a top 16 finalist in the 100 m freestyle at his Olympic debut in Atlanta (1996). As a member of Ukraine's senior national team, Svanidze had won a total of 37 swimming titles in middle-distance freestyle (100 and 200 m), and in freestyle relays (400 and 800 m). Although he never received a single medal in any international tournament, Svanidze was regarded as one of Ukraine's top swimmers in the post-independence era since the break-up of the Soviet Union. Before his untimely death in 2002, he worked as a senior lecturer under the faculty of physical education in Zaporizhia State Medical University.

== Swimming career ==
=== Early years ===
Svanidze, a native in Tbilisi, Georgian SSR, started his sporting career at the age of nine. He later became a pupil and a member of the swimming team for Ukraïna Zaporizhzhia, one of Ukraine's top sports clubs, under his longtime coach and mentor Ivan Proskura.

In 1995, Svanidze made his worldwide breakthrough at the FINA Short Course World Championships in Rio de Janeiro, Brazil, where he placed fifth in a freestyle double (100 and 200 m). He also established a new Ukrainian record of 1:48.73 in the 200 m freestyle.

Svanidze became one of the first ever swimmers to attend Ukraine's historic debut at the 1996 Summer Olympics in Atlanta since the post-Soviet era. In the 100 m freestyle, he powered home with a fourteenth-place effort in the B-Final at 50.43, edging out Canada's Stephen Clarke in a close finish by two-hundredths of a second (0.02).

=== 2000 Summer Olympics ===
At the 2000 Summer Olympics in Sydney, Svanidze competed in three swimming events, including two freestyle relays. He posted a FINA B-standard entry time of 1:52.34 (200 m freestyle) from the European Championships in Helsinki, Finland. On the first day of the Games, Svanidze teamed up with Vyacheslav Shyrshov, Pavlo Khnykin, and Artem Honcharenko in the 4×100 m freestyle relay. Svanidze swam the second leg in heat three and recorded a split of 51.69, but the Ukrainians finished the race in fourth place and twelfth overall with a final time of 3:21.48. In the 200 m freestyle, Svanidze placed twenty-fourth on the morning prelims. Swimming in heat four, he picked up a second spot by almost a third of a second (0.33) behind winner Arūnas Savickas of Lithuania, in a time of 1:52.35. Two days later, Svanidze, along with Goncharenko, Ihor Snitko, and Serhiy Fesenko, placed fourteenth in the 4×200 m freestyle relay with a time of 7:32.16.

Shortly after his second Olympics, Svanidze announced his retirement from swimming. He worked as a full-time senior lecturer under the faculty of physical education, social pedagogy, and psychology at the Zaporizhia State Medical University in Zaporizhia.

== Death ==
On October 14, 2002, at age 30, Svanidze was found unconscious inside the gymnasium at Zaporizhia State Medical University after having suffered a cardiac arrest. He started to become ill while conducting an evening training session for students. He responded to them: "I have a headache; train? probably not; Go to class time, my fellow students". While proceeding to the university's gymnasium, Svanidze felt bad, and eventually collapsed. He was found unconscious by one of his students, before being brought to the University's hospital. Eleven minutes later, he was pronounced dead. Doctors discovered that Svanidze had suffered a cerebral hemorrhage, caused by a traumatic aortic rupture, at the time of his death.

Svanidze's untimely death shocked the nation's entire swimming field. Olympic medalist Denys Sylantyev recalled his emotion for a posthumous swimmer: "It feels like Rostislav just left. Somewhere far away. He and I have never competed, but we were very good friends. In matters of sport, I did not consult with him, because it is impossible to swim in different distances. None of us sought advice in real-life situations, but there is no request that he had not fulfilled. If you cannot do something, It is no longer a promise. We spent a lot of time in training camp, and more often, made fun of each other."
