= Grzegorz Targoński =

Polish archer (born 1978)

Personal information
- Nationality: Polish
- Born: 19 August 1978 (age 46); Warsaw, Poland

Sport
- Sport: Archery

Grzegorz Targoński (born 19 August 1978) is a Polish archer. He competed in the men's individual event at the 2000 Summer Olympics.
