= Raymonde Verlinden =

Belgian archer (born 1945)

Raymonde Verlinden (born 25 September 1945 in Kessel) is a Belgian archer. Verlinden competed in two world championships. At the 1984 Summer Olympic Games, she finished 40th in the women's individual event.

Verlinden's son, Nico Hendrickx, also represented Belgium at the 2000 Summer Olympic Games in archery.
