= Swimming at the 2000 Summer Olympics – Women's 4 × 100 metre medley relay =

Women's 4 × 100 metre medley relay at the Games of the XXVII Olympiad
- Venue: Sydney International Aquatic Centre
- Date: 22 September 2000 (heats); 23 September 2000 (final)
- Competitors: 81 from 18 nations
- Teams: 18
- Winning time: 3:58.30 WR

Medalists
1st place, gold medalist(s)		Barbara Bedford, Megan Quann, Jenny Thompson, Dara Torres, Courtney Shealy*, Staciana Stitts*, Ashley Tappin*, Amy Van Dyken*	United States
2nd place, silver medalist(s)		Dyana Calub, Leisel Jones, Petria Thomas, Susie O'Neill, Giaan Rooney*, Tarnee White*, Sarah Ryan*	Australia
3rd place, bronze medalist(s)		Mai Nakamura, Masami Tanaka, Junko Onishi, Sumika Minamoto; *Indicates the swimmer only competed in the preliminary heats.	Japan

The women's 4 × 100 metre medley relay event at the 2000 Summer Olympics took place on 22–23 September 2000 at the Sydney International Aquatic Centre in Sydney, Australia.

The U.S. women's team established a new world record to defend their Olympic title in the event for the third consecutive streak. Leading the race from the start, Barbara Bedford (1:01.39), Megan Quann (1:06.29), Jenny Thompson (57.25), and Dara Torres (53.37) put together in a sterling time of 3:58.30 to clear the four-minute barrier and to smash China's six-year-old world record by 3.37 seconds. Capturing another relay title for the Americans, Thompson also picked up her eighth gold medal and tenth career as the nation's most successful female athlete in Olympic history.

The Aussie team of Dyana Calub (1:01.83), Leisel Jones (1:08.08), Petria Thomas (57.39), and Susie O'Neill (54.29) finished behind their greatest rivals by over three seconds, but powered home with the silver in an Oceanian record of 4:01.59. Meanwhile, Japan's Mai Nakamura (1:02.08), Masami Tanaka (1:08.65), Junko Onishi (58.72), and Sumika Minamoto (54.71) moved from fifth at the start to produce a spectacular fashion for the bronze in a national record of 4:04.16, holding off a mighty German team of Antje Buschschulte (1:02.05), Sylvia Gerasch (1:08.67), Franziska van Almsick (59.67), and Katrin Meissner (54.04) by 17-hundredths of a second, a time of 4:04.33.

South Africa's Charlene Wittstock (1:02.74), Sarah Poewe (1:07.83), Mandy Loots (59.81), and Helene Muller (54.77) established an African standard to strike the field with a fifth-place effort in 4:05.15. Canada (4:07.55), Great Britain (4:07.61), and China (4:07.83) completed a close finish at the rear of the championship finale.

== Records ==
Prior to this competition, the existing world and Olympic records were as follows.

World record	China (CHN); He Cihong (1:00.16); Dai Guohong (1:09.04); Liu Limin (58.66); Le Jingyi (53.81)	4:01.67	Rome, Italy	10 September 1994
Olympic record	United States; Lea Loveless (1:00.82); Anita Nall (1:08.67); Crissy Ahmann-Leighton (58.58); Jenny Thompson (54.47)	4:02.54	Barcelona, Spain	30 July 1992

The following new world and Olympic records were set during this competition.

Date	Event	Name	Nationality	Time	Record
September 23	Final	Barbara Bedford (1:01.39); Megan Quann (1:06.29); Jenny Thompson (57.25); Dara Torres (53.37)	United States	3:58.30	WR

== Results ==
=== Heats ===
Rank	Heat	Lane	Nation	Swimmers	Time	Notes
1	2	4	Australia	Giaan Rooney (1:02.94); Tarnee White (1:09.19); Petria Thomas (57.71); Sarah Ryan (54.91)	4:04.75	Q
2	2	5	Japan	Mai Nakamura (1:01.61); Masami Tanaka (1:09.37); Junko Onishi (59.25); Sumika Minamoto (55.53)	4:05.76	Q, NR
3	3	3	Germany	Antje Buschschulte (1:02.35); Sylvia Gerasch (1:09.67); Franziska van Almsick (59.20); Katrin Meissner (54.80)	4:06.02	Q
4	3	4	United States	Courtney Shealy (1:02.61); Staciana Stitts (1:09.54); Ashley Tappin (59.58); Amy Van Dyken (54.43)	4:06.16	Q
5	1	5	South Africa	Charlene Wittstock (1:02.57); Sarah Poewe (1:08.89); Mandy Loots (1:00.57); Helene Muller (55.16)	4:07.19	Q, AF
6	1	4	Great Britain	Katy Sexton (1:02.22); Heidi Earp (1:10.04); Sue Rolph (1:00.11); Karen Pickering (55.15)	4:07.52	Q
7	2	6	China	Zhan Shu (1:03.06); Qi Hui (1:09.59); Liu Limin (59.22); Han Xue (56.40)	4:08.27	Q
8	2	3	Canada	Michelle Lischinsky (1:03.32); Christin Petelski (1:10.12); Jen Button (59.86); Laura Nicholls (55.17)	4:08.47	Q
9	2	2	Russia	Oxana Verevka (1:03.69); Olga Bakaldina (1:11.25); Natalya Sutyagina (58.39); Inna Yaitskaya (56.31)	4:09.64	
10	3	5	Sweden	Camilla Johansson (1:05.18); Emma Igelström (1:10.93); Johanna Sjöberg (58.56); Louise Jöhncke (55.71)	4:10.38	
11	1	3	Belgium	Sofie Wolfs (1:05.15); Brigitte Becue (1:08.88); Fabienne Dufour (1:00.99); Nina van Koeckhoven (55.96)	4:10.98	
12	1	2	Poland	Aleksandra Miciul (1:04.18); Alicja Pęczak (1:09.19); Anna Uryniuk (1:01.81); Otylia Jędrzejczak (55.90)	4:11.08	NR
13	1	7	Hungary	Annamária Kiss (1:06.15); Ágnes Kovács (1:07.75); Orsolya Ferenczy (1:00.61); Gyöngyver Lakos (56.60)	4:11.11	
14	1	6	Netherlands	Brenda Starink (1:06.93); Madelon Baans (1:08.90); Chantal Groot (1:01.09); Thamar Henneken (55.39)	4:12.31	
15	3	2	Spain	Ivette María (1:03.15); María Carmen Collado (1:13.29); Mireia García (1:01.11); Laura Roca (56.99)	4:14.54	
16	3	7	Ukraine	Nadiya Beshevli (1:04.52); Svitlana Bondarenko (1:10.13); Olena Grytsyuk (1:02.77); Valentyna Tregub (58.22)	4:15.64	
17	2	7	South Korea	Shim Min-ji (1:03.14); Ku Hyo-jin (1:10.89); Lee Bo-eun (1:03.15); Chang Hee-jin (59.75)	4:16.93	
18	3	6	Romania	Raluca Udroiu (1:04.44); Simona Păduraru (1:17.54); Florina Herea (1:03.75); Ioana Diaconescu (57.83)	4:23.56	

=== Final ===
Rank	Lane	Nation	Swimmers	Time	Time behind	Notes
1st place, gold medalist(s)	6	United States	Barbara Bedford (1:01.39); Megan Quann (1:06.29); Jenny Thompson (57.25); Dara Torres (53.37)	3:58.30		WR
2nd place, silver medalist(s)	4	Australia	Dyana Calub (1:01.83); Leisel Jones (1:08.08); Petria Thomas (57.39); Susie O'Neill (54.29)	4:01.59	3.29	OC
3rd place, bronze medalist(s)	5	Japan	Mai Nakamura (1:02.08); Masami Tanaka (1:08.65); Junko Onishi (58.72); Sumika Minamoto (54.71)	4:04.16	5.86	NR
4	3	Germany	Antje Buschschulte (1:02.05); Sylvia Gerasch (1:08.57); Franziska van Almsick (59.67); Katrin Meissner (54.04)	4:04.33	6.03	NR
5	2	South Africa	Charlene Wittstock (1:02.74); Sarah Poewe (1:07.83); Mandy Loots (59.81); Helene Muller (54.77)	4:05.15	6.85	AF
6	8	Canada	Kelly Stefanyshyn (1:02.73); Christin Petelski (1:09.14); Jen Button (1:00.13); Marianne Limpert (55.55)	4:07.55	9.23	NR
7	7	Great Britain	Katy Sexton (1:02.05); Heidi Earp (1:10.25); Sue Rolph (1:00.05); Karen Pickering (55.26)	4:07.61	9.31	NR
8	1	China	Zhan Shu (1:02.70); Qi Hui (1:09.40); Liu Limin (59.33); Han Xue (56.40)	4:07.83	9.53	
