= Peter Ebden =

New Zealand archer (born 1982)

Personal information
- Nationality: New Zealand
- Born: 26 August 1982 (age 43) Bath, England

Sport
- Sport: Archery

Peter Ebden (born 26 August 1982) is a New Zealand archer. He competed in the men's individual event at the 2000 Summer Olympics.
