= Jan Erik Humlekjær =

Norwegian archer (born 1946)

Personal information
- Nationality: Norwegian
- Born: 30 September 1946 (age 78); Fredrikstad, Norway

Sport
- Sport: Archery

Achievements and titles
- Olympic finals: 1972, 1976
- Updated on 12 March 2016

Jan Erik Humlekjær (born 30 September 1946) is a Norwegian archer. He was born in Fredrikstad. He competed in archery at the 1972 Summer Olympics in Munich. He also competed at the 1976 Summer Olympics in Montreal.

He is the father of archer Lars Erik Humlekjær.
