= Olena Hrytsyuk =

Ukrainian swimmer

Personal information
- Full name: Olena Hrytsyuk
- National team: Ukraine
- Born: 2 April 1970 (age 56)
- Height: 1.75 m (5 ft 9 in)
- Weight: 55 kg (121 lb)

Sport
- Sport: Swimming
- Strokes: Butterfly

Olena Hrytsyuk (Ukrainian: Олена Грицюк; born April 2, 1970) is a Ukrainian former swimmer, who specialized in sprint butterfly events. Hrystyuk competed for Ukraine in the women's 4×100 m medley relay at the 2000 Summer Olympics in Sydney. Teaming with Nadiya Beshevli, Svitlana Bondarenko, and Valentyna Trehub in heat three, Hrystyuk swam the butterfly leg and recorded a split of 1:02.77, but the Ukrainians settled only for seventh place and sixteenth overall in a final time of 4:15.64.
