= Simon Fairweather =

Australian archer (born 1969)

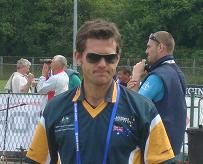
- Fairweather at 2009 Archery World Cup

Personal information
- Full name: Simon John Fairweather
- Born: 9 October 1969 (age 57) Adelaide, South Australia
- Height: 175 cm (5 ft 9 in)
- Weight: 71 kg (157 lb)
- Spouse: Jacquilyn Fairweather (2004–2014; her death)
Medal record
Men's archery
Representing Australia
Olympic Games
Gold medal – first place	2000 Sydney	Individual
World Championships
Gold medal – first place	1991 Krakow	Individual
Bronze medal – third place	1991 Krakow	Team
World Games
Silver medal – second place	2025 Chengdu	Barebow

Simon John Fairweather, OAM (born 9 October 1969) is an archer born in Adelaide, South Australia.

== Career ==
Fairweather won the individual gold medal at the World Championships in Poland in 1991.

Fairweather was declared the Young Australian of the Year in 1991.

After an early Olympic career in which he was generally considered not to have lived up to his promise, Fairweather shot back into Australia's national consciousness, "stopping the nation" with his gold-medal performance in men's individual archery at the 2000 Summer Olympics. He was also a member of the Australian team which finished twelfth in the team competition.

Simon went to 5 Olympic Games: 1988, 1992, 1996, 2000, 2004. He has won countless Australia titles over a 20-year period.

In 1997, Fairweather gained a degree in jewellery design from the University of South Australia.

In 2002, Fairweather was inducted into the Australian Institute of Sport Best of the Best.

Fairweather was inducted into the Sport Australia Hall of Fame in 2009.

On 1 February 2009, Archery Australia announced the appointment of Fairweather as National Head Coach of Archery in Australia.

== Personal life ==
Fairweather was married to former triathlon world champion Jackie Fairweather (née Gallagher) from 2004 until her death on 2 November 2014.

Awards and achievements
Preceded by Michael Klim	Australian Athlete of the Year; 2000	Succeeded by Petria Thomas and Philippe Rizzo
