= Ismely Arias =

Cuban archer (born 1977)

Personal information
- Nationality: Cuban
- Born: 4 August 1977 (age 48)

Sport
- Sport: Archery
Medal record
Representing Cuba
Pan American Games
Bronze medal – third place	1999 Winnipeg	Men's team

Ismely Arias (born 4 August 1977) is a Cuban former archer. He competed in the men's individual event at the 2000 Summer Olympics.
