= Kim Chung-tae (archer) =

South Korean archer (born 1980)

- Hangul: 김청태
- Hanja: 金清泰
- RR: Gim Cheongtae
- MR: Kim Ch'ŏngt'ae

Olympic medal record

Men's archery
Gold medal – first place	2000 Sydney	Team

Kim Chung-tae (Korean: 김청태; born July 6, 1980) is an archer from South Korea.

Kim was a member of Korea's gold medal men's archery team at the 2000 Summer Olympics. In the men's individual competition he finished fifth.

== See also ==
- Korean archery
- Archery
- List of South Korean archers
