= Viktor Kurchenko =

Ukrainian archer (born 1965)

Personal information
- Nationality: Ukrainian
- Born: 6 January 1965 (age 61)

Sport
- Sport: Archery

Viktor Kurchenko (born 6 January 1965) is a Ukrainian archer. He competed in the men's individual, and team events at the 2000 Summer Olympics.
