= Miika Aulio =

Finnish archer (born 1975)

Personal information
- Nationality: Finnish
- Born: 19 November 1975 (age 49); Helsinki, Finland

Sport
- Sport: Archery

Miika Aulio (born 19 November 1975) is a Finnish archer. He competed in the men's individual event at the 2000 Summer Olympics.
