= Juan Carlos Manjarrez =

Mexican archer (born 1980)

Personal information
- Born: 1 December 1980 (age 44); Mexico City, Mexico

Sport
- Sport: Archery

Juan Carlos Manjarrez (born 1 December 1980) is a Mexican archer. He competed in the men's individual event at the 2000 Summer Olympics.
