= Serhiy Antonov =

Ukrainian archer (born 1965)

Personal information
- Nationality: Ukrainian
- Born: 18 August 1965 (age 59)

Sport
- Sport: Archery

Serhiy Antonov (born 18 August 1965) is a Ukrainian archer. He competed in the men's individual and team events at the 2000 Summer Olympics.
