= Christian Stubbe =

German archer (born 1982)

Christian Stubbe (born January 26, 1982, in Oberhausen) is an athlete from Germany, who competes in archery.

== 2000 Summer Olympics ==
At the 2000 Summer Olympics in Sydney Stubbe finished his ranking round with a total of 596 points, which gave him the 54th seed for the final competition bracket in which he faced Lionel Torres in the first round. Stubbe won the match by 163-161 and Torres was eliminated. In the next round, Stubbe lost to Yang Bo.
