= Franck Fisseux =

French archer (born 1985)

Franck Fisseux (born 19 February 1985) is an athlete from Avignon, France. He competes in archery.

Fisseux competed at the 2004 Summer Olympics in men's individual archery. He was defeated in the first round of elimination, placing 38th overall. Fisseux was also a member of the 10th-place French men's archery team at the 2004 Summer Olympics.
