= Valentyna Trehub =

Ukrainian swimmer

Personal information
- Full name: Valentyna Trehub
- National team: Ukraine
- Born: 15 September 1977 (age 48)
- Height: 1.85 m (6 ft 1 in)
- Weight: 75 kg (165 lb)

Sport
- Sport: Swimming
- Strokes: Freestyle
Medal record
Women's swimming
Representing Ukraine
Summer Universiade
Bronze medal – third place	1999 Mallorca	4 x 400 m metres

Valentyna Trehub (Ukrainian: Валентина Трегуб; born September 15, 1977) is a Ukrainian former swimmer, who specialized in sprint freestyle events. Trehub competed for Ukraine in two relay swimming events at the 2000 Summer Olympics in Sydney. On the first day of the Games, Trehub teamed up with Nadiya Beshevli, Olena Lapunova, and Olga Mukomol in the 4 × 100 m freestyle relay. Swimming the second leg, she recorded a split of 57.39, but the Ukrainians rounded out the seven-team field to last place and thirteenth overall in a final time of 3:49.11. Because of her powerful effort in the freestyle relay and Mukomol's decision to focus on her sprint double, Trehub was selected to join with Beshevli, Svitlana Bondarenko, and Olena Hrytsyuk in the 4 × 100 m medley relay. During the prelims race, she swam the freestyle leg in heat three with an anchor of 58.22 to deliver a fifth-place finish and sixteenth overall for the Ukrainians in 4:15.64.
