= Scott Hunter-Russell =

Australian archer (born 1970)

Personal information
- Nationality: Australian
- Born: 1 June 1970 (age 55) Sydney, Australia

Sport
- Sport: Archery

Scott Hunter-Russell (born 1 June 1970) is an Australian archer. He competed at the 1992 Summer Olympics and the 2000 Summer Olympics.
