= Lars Erik Humlekjær =

Norwegian archer (born 1971)

Personal information
- Born: 1971 (age 54–55) Fredrikstad, Norway

Sport
- Sport: Archery

Lars Erik Humlekjær (born 1971) is a Norwegian archer. He was born in Fredrikstad, and is a son of Jan Erik Humlekjær. He competed in archery at the 2000 Summer Olympics in Sydney, where he placed tenth with the Norwegian team and 40th in the individual competition.
