= Yeon Jung-ki =

South Korean archer

Medal record

Men's archery

Representing South Korea

World Championships
Gold medal – first place	2001 Beijing	Individual
Gold medal – first place	2001 Beijing	Team

Yeon Jung-ki (Korean: 연정기) is a South Korean archer who won the 2001 World Archery Championships in Beijing.
