= Masafumi Makiyama =

Japanese archer (born 1979)

Masafumi Makiyama (牧山 雅文, Makiyama Masafumi; born December 24, 1979 in Saga) is a Japanese archer. He competed in the 2000 Summer Olympics.
