= Simon Needham =

British archer (born 1959)

Personal information
- Nationality: British
- Born: 10 October 1959 (age 65); Plymouth, England

Sport
- Sport: Archery

Simon Needham (born 10 October 1959) is a British archer. He competed in the men's individual event at the 2000 Summer Olympics.
