= Felipe López (archer) =

Spanish archer (born 1977)

Felipe López Garrido (born 10 March 1977 in Seville) is an athlete from Spain, who competes in archery. López competed at the 2004 Summer Olympics in men's individual archery. He was defeated in the first round of elimination, placing 40th overall.
