= Nico Hendrickx =

Belgian archer (born 1976)

Personal information
- Nationality: Belgian
- Born: 16 February 1976 (age 50) Lier, Belgium
- Occupation: archer

Sport
- Country: Belgium
- Sport: archery

Achievements and titles
- Olympic finals: 10th seed at the 2000 Summer Olympic Games
- World finals: 1999 European Grand Prix (team bronze)
- National finals: XII Golden Arrow event (individual bronze medal); EMAU Grand Prix Tournier Der Nationen (silver medal)

Nico Hendrickx (born 16 February 1976 in Lier) is a Belgian archer.

== Career ==
Hendrickx won an individual bronze medal at the XII Golden Arrow event and a team bronze at the 1999 European Grand Prix. He won a silver medal at the EMAU Grand Prix Tournier Der Nationen.

Hendrickx competed in five World Archery Championships and had a highest finish of sixth.

At the 2000 Summer Olympic Games he scored 640 points in the ranking round of the Men's individual event which made him the tenth seed. Hendrickx defeated Jubzhang Jubzhang of Bhutan 162–156 in the first round before losing 154–151 to Vadim Shikarev of Kazakhstan in the second round.

== Family ==
Hendrickx's mother Raymonde Verlinden represented Belgium at the 1984 Summer Olympic Games in archery.
