= Oleksandr Skrypnyk (diver) =

Ukrainian diver

Personal information
- Nationality: Ukrainian
- Born: 31 December 1978 (age 47)

Sport
- Sport: Diving
Medal record
Men's diving
Representing Ukraine
European Championships
Silver medal – second place	2000 Helsinki	10 m synchro
World Junior Championships
Gold medal – first place	1993 London	10 m platform
Silver medal – second place	1993 London	3 m springboard
European Junior Diving Championships
Gold medal – first place	1995 Geneva	1 m springboard
Gold medal – first place	1996 København	3 m springboard
Gold medal – first place	1996 København	10 m platform
Silver medal – second place	1994 Pardubice	3 m springboard
Bronze medal – third place	1995 Geneva	3 m springboard
Bronze medal – third place	1996 København	1 m springboard

Oleksandr Skrypnyk (born 31 December 1978) is a Ukrainian diver. He competed in two events at the 2000 Summer Olympics.
