= Matteo Bisiani =

Italian archer (born 1978)

Personal information
- Born: 2 August 1978 (age 47) Monfalcone, Italy
Medal record
Men's archery
Representing Italy
Olympic Games
Silver medal – second place	2000 Sydney	Team
Bronze medal – third place	1996 Atlanta	Team
World Championships
Gold medal – first place	1999 Riom	Team (recurve)
Silver medal – second place	1995 Jakarta	Individual (recurve)

Matteo Bisiani (born 2 August 1978) is an Italian archer. He competed in the 1996 Olympic Games and in the 2000 Olympic Games.

== Biography ==
He was born in Monfalcone. In 1996 he won the bronze medal with the Italian team. In the individual competition he finished ninth.

Four years later he won the silver medal as member of the Italian team. In the individual competition he finished 21st.

== Bibliography ==
- RAI Profile
