= Niklas Eriksson (archer) =

Swedish archer (born 1981)

Personal information
- Nationality: Swedish
- Born: 17 November 1981 (age 43); Sundsvall, Sweden

Sport
- Sport: Archery

Niklas Eriksson (born 17 November 1981) is a Swedish archer. He competed in the men's individual and team events at the 2000 Summer Olympics.
