= Anton Prylepau =

Belarusian archer (born 1984)

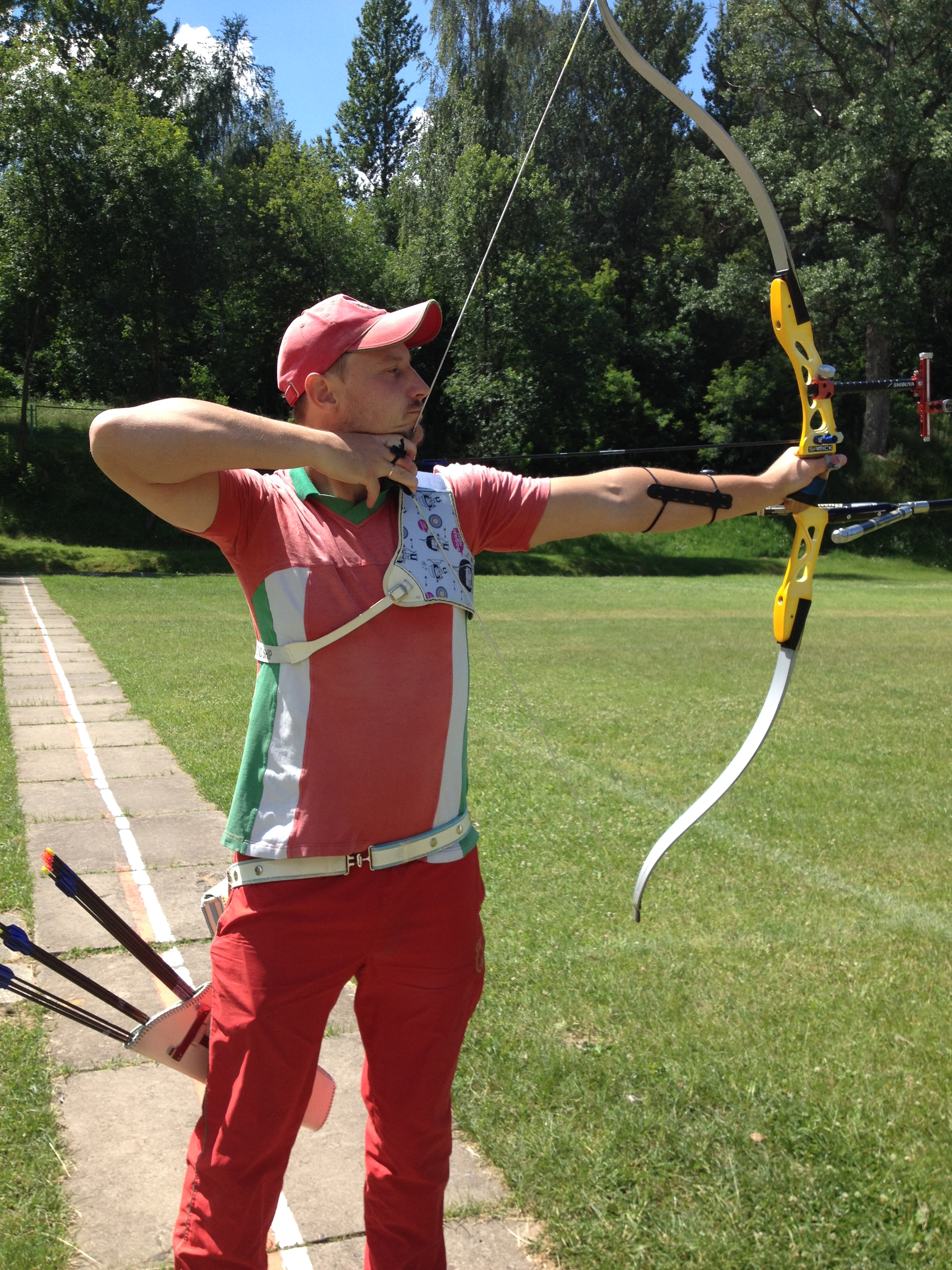
Prilepov Anton in 2014

Anton Mikhailavich Prylepau or Prilepov (Belarusian: Антон Міхайлавіч Прылепаў; born 5 February 1984 in Mogilev) is an athlete from Belarus. He competes in archery.

Prylepau competed at the 2004 Summer Olympics in men's individual archery. He won his first match, advancing to the round of 32. In the second round of elimination, he was again victorious and advanced to the round of 16. The third match was Prylepau's downfall, as he lost to Park Kyung-mo of Korea. Prylepau placed 9th overall.
