= Henk Vogels (archer) =

Dutch archer (born 1964)

Personal information
- Nationality: Dutch
- Born: 19 June 1964 (age 60); Eindhoven, Netherlands

Sport
- Sport: Archery

Henk Vogels (born 19 June 1964) is a Dutch archer. He competed at the 1992 Summer Olympics and the 2000 Summer Olympics.
