= Bartosz Mikos =

Polish archer (born 1980)

Bartosz Mikos (born 8 March 1980, Kielce) is a Polish archer who competed notably at the Riom 1999 World Archery Championships, 2000 Summer Olympics, Florence 2001 World Archery Indoor Championships and the Beijing 2001 World Archery Championships.

== World championship appearances ==
Below is a recap on the 4 major world championship Bartosz Mikos took a part of.

=== Riom 1999 World Archery Championships ===
The Riom, France 1999 World Archery Championship started for Bartosz Mikos with a match against Matthew Gray (Australia) this match ended as a win for Bartosz Mikos with a final score of 161-157. This mean Mikos was moving on to round two, where he faced Lionel Torres. This round ended 161-164 in favour of Lionel meaning Bartosz was knocked out.
