= Balzhinima Tsyrempilov =

Russian archer

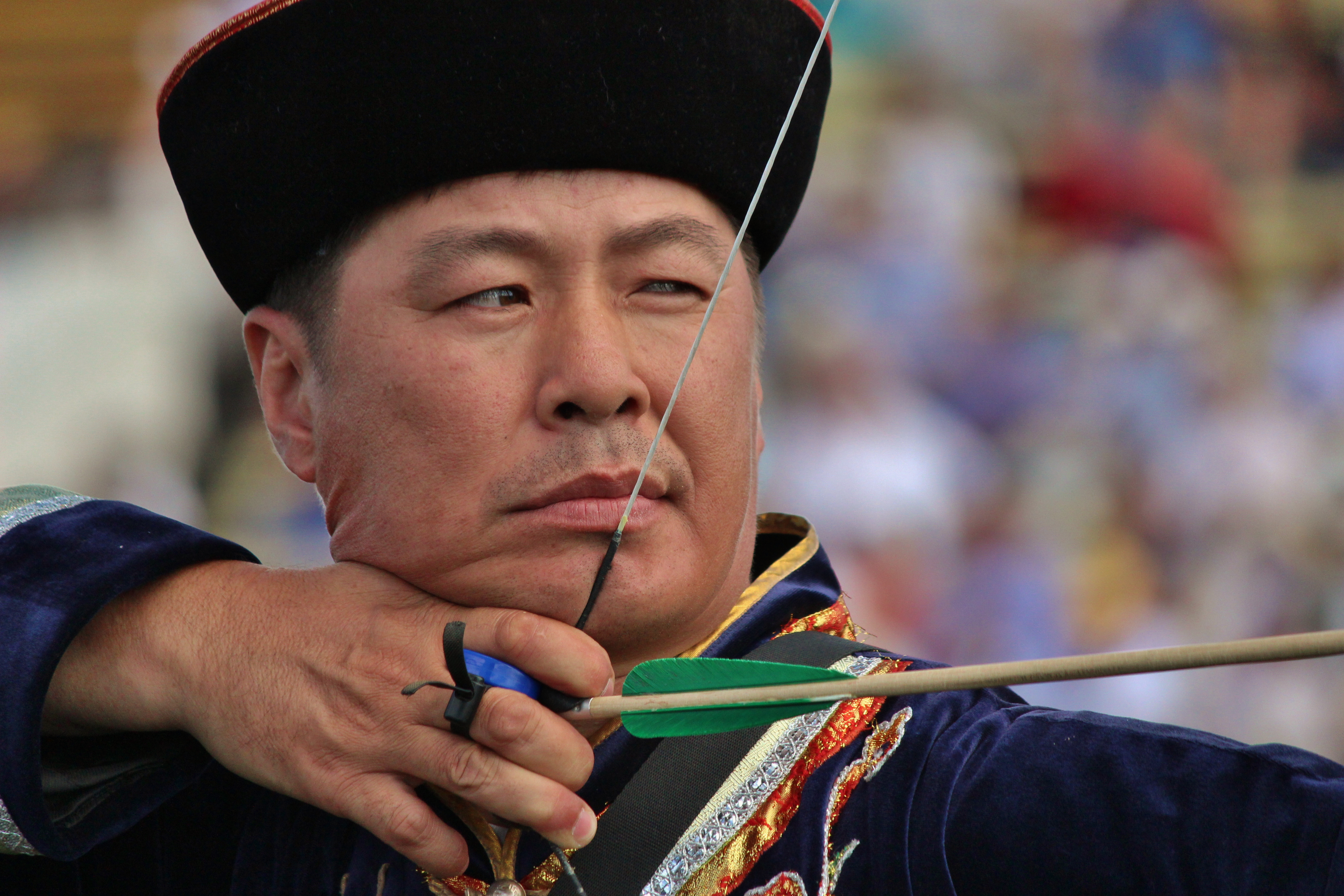
- Olympic archer Tsyrempilov

Personal information
- Born: April 9, 1975 (age 51) Ulekchin, Zakamensky District, Buryatia, Russia
Medal record
Men's archery
Representing Russia
World Archery Championships
Silver medal – second place	2007 Leipzig	Individual
Bronze medal – third place	1997 Victoria	Team
Archery World Cup
Gold medal – first place	2007 Dubai	Individual
European Archery Championships
Gold medal – first place	2008 Vittel	Individual
Gold medal – first place	2000 Antalya	Individual
Gold medal – first place	1998 Boé	Individual
Gold medal – first place	1996 Kranjska Gora	Individual
Silver medal – second place	1994 Nymburk	Individual
Bronze medal – third place	2004 Brussels	Individual

Balzhinima Tsyrenzhapovich Tsyrempilov (Russian: Бальжинима́ Цыренжа́пович Цыремпи́лов, Balzhinimá Tsyrenzhápovich Tsyrempílov, born April 9, 1975, in Ulekchin, Zakamensky District, Buryatia) is a World Cup-winning and former world number one Buryat archer from Russia.

== 2004 Summer Olympics ==
Tsyrempilov competed at the 2004 Summer Olympics in men's individual archery. Tsyrempilov placed 14th overall.

== 2007 World Championship ==
At the 2007 World Archery Championships in July 2007 in Leipzig, Tsyrempilov won silver in recurve men's individual.

== 2008 Summer Olympics ==
At the Men's individual archery event of 2008 Summer Olympics in Beijing Tsyrempilov finished his ranking round with a total of 671 points, eight points behind Juan René Serrano, the winner of the round. This gave him the sixth seed for the final competition bracket in which he faced Daniel Pavlov in the first round, beating the Bulgarian 112-102. In the second round Tsyrempilov had a rematch with Chen Szu-Yuan and took revenge for the loss in 2004 with a 109–101 win. However, in the third round Tsyrempilov's tournament was over after he was unable to beat Ryuichi Moriya, 113-110.

Together with Andrey Abramov and Bair Badënov he also took part in the team event. With his 671 score from the ranking round combined with the 660 of Abramov and the 658 of Badënov Russia was in fourth position after the ranking round, which gave them a straight seed into the quarter-finals. However, with 217-209 they were beaten by the team from China that eventually won the bronze medal.

== Individual performance timeline ==
Tournament	2000	2001	2002	2003	2004	2005	2006	2007	2008	2009	2010	2011	2012	2013	2014	SR
Competitor for	Russia															
World Archery tournaments
Olympic Games	QF				3R				3R							0/3
World Championships		QF		2R		2R		2nd		2R						0/5
World Cup Final							DNQ	W	DNQ	DNQ	DNQ					1/1
End of year world ranking		1	4	14	15	7	20	1	4	10	20	52		136	238	
