= Hasse Pavia Lind =

Danish archer (born 1979)

Hasse Pavia Lind (born 10 June 1979) is an athlete from Denmark. He competes in archery. Lind competed at the 2004 Summer Olympics in men's individual archery. He won his first match, advancing to the round of 32. He was eliminated in the second round. He finished 19th overall.
