= Vadim Shikarev =

Kazakhstani archer (1968–2001)

Personal information
- Nationality: Kazakhstani
- Born: 15 November 1968 Katan, Uzbek SSR, Soviet Union
- Died: 28 November 2000 (aged 32)

Sport
- Sport: Archery

Vadim Shikarev (Вадим Юрьевич Шикарев, 15 November 1968 – 28 November 2000) was a Kazakhstani archer. He competed at the 1992 Summer Olympics, the 1996 Summer Olympics and the 2000 Summer Olympics.
