= Pavlo Khnykin =

Ukrainian swimmer (born 1969)

Personal information
- Native name: Павел Хныкин
- Nationality: Ukraine
- Born: April 5, 1969 (age 57) Sverdlovsk, Russian SFSR, Soviet Union
- Height: 6 ft 1 in (185 cm)
- Weight: 159 lb (72 kg)

Sport
- Sport: Swimming
- Strokes: Freestyle
Medal record
Men's swimming
Representing the Unified Team
Olympic Games
Silver medal – second place	1992 Barcelona	4×100 m freestyle
Silver medal – second place	1992 Barcelona	4×100 m medley
Representing Soviet Union
European Championships (LC)
Gold medal – first place	1991 Athens	4×100 m freestyle
Representing Ukraine
European Championships (LC)
Bronze medal – third place	1993 Athens	100 m freestyle
Bronze medal – third place	2000 Helsinki	4×100 m medley
Universiade
Bronze medal – third place	1993 Buffalo	100 m freestyle

Pavlo Khnykin (born April 5, 1969) is a retired freestyle swimmer from Vinnytsia, Ukraine. He was born in Sverdlovsk, Russian SFSR.

He competed in four consecutive Summer Olympics, starting in 1992 for the Unified Team. He won the silver medal in the men's 4×100 m freestyle relay at the 1992 Summer Olympics, alongside Gennadiy Prigoda, Yury Bashkatov and Alexander Popov.
