= Fred van Zutphen =

Dutch archer (born 1971)

Medal record

Men's archery

Representing Netherlands

European Archery Championships
Silver medal – second place	2000 Antalya	Team
Silver medal – second place	2010 Rovereto	Team
Bronze medal – third place	2004 Brussels	Individual

Fred van Zutphen (born 7 January 1971 in Veghel), is a Dutch retired compound archer. Amongst his achievements are competing at the 2000 Summer Olympics in the recurve discipline, where he reached the last 16, winning stages in the team competition at the FITA Archery World Cup in 2006 and 2009, winning silver medals at the European Archery Championships and becoming the world number one ranked archer in 2003.
