= Yang Bo (archer) =

Chinese archer (born 1978)

Personal information
- Nationality: Chinese
- Born: 23 August 1978 (age 47)

Sport
- Sport: Archery

Yang Bo (Chinese: 杨波; pinyin: Yáng Bō; born 23 August 1978) is a Chinese archer. He competed in the men's individual and team events at the 2000 Summer Olympics.
