= Hasan Orbay =

Turkish archer (born 1979)

Hasan Orbay (born 14 August 1979) is a Turkish archer.

Orbay competed at the 2000 and 2004 Summer Olympics in men's individual archery. In 2004 he was defeated in the first round of elimination, placed 33rd overall.
