= Yury Leontyev =

Russian archer (born 1961)

Personal information
- Nationality: Russian
- Born: 14 August 1961 (age 65) Cheboksary, Russia

Sport
- Sport: Archery

Yury Leontyev (born 14 August 1961) is a Russian archer. He competed at the 1988 Summer Olympics and the 2000 Summer Olympics.
