= Mattias Eriksson =

Swedish archer (born 1981)

Personal information
- Nationality: Swedish
- Born: 17 November 1981 (age 44) Sundsvall, Medelpad

Sport
- Sport: Archery
- Event: Recurve archery

Mattias Eriksson (born 17 November 1981 in Sundsvall, Medelpad) is a Swedish archer.

Eriksson competed at the 2004 Summer Olympics in men's individual archery. He was defeated in the first round of elimination, being placed 39th overall. Later Eriksson was a member of the 9th-place Swedish men's archery team.

Previously he competed at the 2000 Summer Olympics, where he was placed 42nd.
