= Ilario Di Buò =

Italian archer (born 1965)

Personal information
- Born: 13 December 1965 (age 60) Trieste, Italy
Medal record
Men's archery
Representing Italy
Olympic Games
Silver medal – second place	2000 Sydney	Team
Silver medal – second place	2008 Beijing	Team
World Championships
Gold medal – first place	1999 Riom	Team (recurve)
Silver medal – second place	2001 Beijing	Team (recurve)
Bronze medal – third place	2003 New York City	Team (recurve)
European Championships
Silver medal – second place	1990	Individual
Silver medal – second place	1996	Individual
Silver medal – second place	2000	Individual

Ilario Di Buò (born 13 December 1965 in Trieste) is an archer from Italy, who was formerly ranked number one in the world.

Di Buò won a silver medal at the 2000 Summer Olympics in the team archery competition. He placed 20th in the individual competition.

== 2004 Summer Olympics ==
Di Buò competed at the 2004 Summer Olympics in men's individual archery. He won his first match, advancing to the round of 32. In the second round of elimination, he was again victorious and advanced to the round of 16. The third match was Di Buò's downfall, as he lost to fellow Italian and eventual gold medalist Marco Galiazzo. Di Buò placed 16th overall. He was also a member of the 7th-place Italian men's archery team at the 2004 Summer Olympics.

== 2008 Summer Olympics ==
At the 2008 Summer Olympics in Beijing Di Buò finished his ranking round with a total of 670 points, nine points behind leader Juan René Serrano. This gave him the 9th seed for the final competition bracket in which he faced Martin Bulíř in the first round, beating the Czech 111-100. In the second round Di Buò and his opponent Vic Wunderle both scored 108 points in the regular match and had to go to an extra round. In this extra round Di Buò scored 17 points, while Wunderle advanced to the third round with 19 points.

Together with Marco Galiazzo and Mauro Nespoli he also took part in the team event. With his 670 score from the ranking round combined with the 667 of Galiazzo and the 649 of Nespoli the Italians were in sixth position after the ranking round. In the first round they were too strong for the Canadian team 219-217. They advanced to the semi-final by eliminating Malaysia 218-213. After that they reached the final by beating Ukraine 223-221. In the final they managed to get 225 points, but South Korea took the gold medal with 227 points.
