= Ihor Parkhomenko =

Ukrainian archer (born 1972)

Personal information
- Nationality: Ukrainian
- Born: 3 July 1972 (age 53)

Sport
- Sport: Archery
Medal record
Men's archery
Representing Ukraine
World Indoor Championships
| Gold medal – first place | 2005 Aalborg | Team |
European Championships
| Bronze medal – third place | 1998 Boé/Agen | Individual |
European Indoor Championships
| Gold medal – first place | 2004 Sassari | Team |
| Bronze medal – third place | 1996 Mol | Team |

Ihor Parkhomenko (born 3 July 1972) is a Ukrainian retired archer. He competed in the men's individual and team events at the 2000 Summer Olympics. After his sporting career, Parkhomenko became coach and head of the archery territorial union in Kyiv.
