= Jocelyn de Grandis =

French archer (born 1980)

Jocelyn de Grandis (born 23 November 1980, in Besançon) is a French archer.

De Grandis competed at the 2004 Summer Olympics in men's individual archery. Despite being ranked as number 11 beforehand, he was defeated in the first round of elimination, placing 51st overall. Later, De Grandis was a member of the 10th-place French men's archery team at the 2004 Summer Olympics.

Previously he competed at the 2000 Summer Olympics, where he placed 29th.
