= Lionel Torres =

French archer (born 1975)

Medal record

Men's archery

Representing France

World Championships
Silver medal – second place	2001 Beijing	Individual
Bronze medal – third place	1999 Riom	Individual

Lionel Torres (born 16 March 1975) is a French athlete from Perpignan who competes in recurve archery. He competed at the 2000 Olympic Games, qualifying in 11th place but losing in the first knockout round, and has won two individual medals at the World Archery Championships and was the world number one archer from May 2002 to February 2003.
