= India at the 1996 Summer Olympics =

- IOC code: IND
- NOC: Indian Olympic Association
- Website: olympic.ind.in

in Atlanta
- Competitors: 49 in 13 sports
- Flag bearers: Pargat Singh (opening); Leander Paes (closing)
- Medals Ranked 71st: Gold 0 Silver 0 Bronze 1 Total 1

Summer Olympics appearances (overview)
- 1900; 1904–1912; 1920; 1924; 1928; 1932; 1936; 1948; 1952; 1956; 1960; 1964; 1968; 1972; 1976; 1980; 1984; 1988; 1992; 1996; 2000; 2004; 2008; 2012; 2016; 2020; 2024

India competed at the 1996 Summer Olympics in Atlanta, United States. Leander Paes' bronze in the men's tennis event was the only medal won by the country. It had been 44 years since an Indian last won an individual medal at the Olympics (K. D. Jadhav earned bronze for freestyle bantamweight wrestling at the 1952 Summer Olympics, Helsinki). The medal was also India's first since their men's hockey team won gold at the 1980 Moscow Olympics. Subash Razdan, a prominent Indian American community leader in Atlanta was appointed Attache for India by the Indian Olympic Association. He also served as the acting chef-de-mission for the Indian contingent.

== Medalists ==
Medal	Name	Sport	Event	Date
Bronze	Leander Paes	Tennis	Men's singles	August 3

== Competitors ==
There were 49 athletes who took part in the medal events across 13 sports.

Sport	Men	Women	Athletes	Events
Archery	3	0	3	2
Athletics	2	4	6	3
Badminton	1	1	2	2
Boxing	3	0	3	3
Equestrian	1	0	1	1
Field hockey	16	0	16	1
Judo	2	2	4	4
Shooting	2	0	2	3
Swimming	1	1	2	2
Table tennis	1	1	2	2
Tennis	2	0	2	2
Weightlifting	5	0	5	5
Wrestling	1	0	1	1
Total	40	9	49	31

== Archery ==
In India's third appearance in Olympic archery, the nation was represented by three men. Lalremsanga Chhangte was the only one to win a match.

Athlete	Event	Ranking round		Round of 64	Round of 32	Round of 16	Quarterfinals	Semifinals	Final / BM	
Athlete	Event	Score	Seed	Opposition Score	Opposition Score	Opposition Score	Opposition Score	Opposition Score	Opposition Score	Rank
Changte Lalremsaga	Men's Individual	650	32	Andrew Lindsay (NZL); W 169–156	Michele Frangilli (ITA); L 158–164	Did not advance				
Limba Ram	Men's Individual	644	44	Paul Vermeiren (BEL); L 140–165	Did not advance					
Skalzang Dorje	Men's Individual	634	55	Matteo Bisiani (ITA); L 156–167	Did not advance					
Limba Ram; Skalzang Dorje; Changte Lalremsaga	Men's Team	1928	14	—N/a		United States; L 235–251	Did not advance			

== Athletics ==
Track And Road Events

Athlete	Event	Heat		Semifinal		Final	
Athlete	Event	Result	Rank	Result	Rank	Result	Rank
Bahadur Prasad	Men's 1500 Meter	3:46.16	8	Did not advance			
Beenamol Mathew; Rosakutty Kunnath Chacko; Jyotirmoyee Sikdar; Shiny Wilson	Women's 4 × 400 m relay	DSQ		—N/a		Did not advance	

Field Events

Athlete	Event	Qualification		Final	
Athlete	Event	Distance	Rank	Distance	Rank
Shakti Singh	Men's Discus Throw	56.58m	30	Did not advance	

== Badminton ==
Athlete	Event	Round of 64	Round of 32	Round of 16	Quarter-final	Semi-final	Final / BM	
Athlete	Event	Opposition Score	Opposition Score	Opposition Score	Opposition Score	Opposition Score	Opposition Score	Rank
Deepankar Bhattacharya	Men's Singles	Bye	Heryanto Arbi (INA); L (5–15, 4–15)	Did not advance				
P.V.V. Lakshmi	Women's Singles	Anne Gibson (GBR); W (11–6, 11–6)	Katarzyna Krasowska (POL); L (5–11, 6–11)	Did not advance				

== Boxing ==
Athlete	Event	Round of 32	Round of 16	Quarterfinals	Semifinals	Final	
Athlete	Event	Opposition Result	Opposition Result	Opposition Result	Opposition Result	Opposition Result	Rank
Debendra Thapa	Men's Light Flyweight (48 kg)	Masibulele Makepula (RSA); L RCS-1	Did not advance				
Gurcharn Singh	Men's Light Heavyweight (81 kg)	Enrique Flores (PUR); L 7–15	Did not advance				
Lakha Singh	Men's Heavyweight (91 kg)	Wojciech Bartnik (POL); L 2–14	Did not advance				

== Equestrian ==
Athlete	Event	Horse	Dressage	Cross Country	Jumping	Total	Rank
Indrajit Lamba	Individual Eventing	Karishma	79.40	EL		EL	

== Field Hockey ==
Team Roster:

- Subbaiah Anjaparavanda
- Harpreet Singh
- Mohammed Riaz
- Sanjeev Kumar
- Baljeet Singh
- Sabu Varkey
- Mukesh Kumar
- Rahul Singh
- Dhanraj Pillay
- Pargat Singh (captain)
- Baljit Singh Dhillon
- Alloysuis Edwards
- Anil Alexander
- Gavin Ferreira
- Ramandeep Singh
- Dilip Tirkey

Preliminary round

Group A

Team	Pld	W	D	L	GF	GA	GD	Pts
Spain	5	4	0	1	14	5	+9	8
Germany	5	3	1	1	10	3	+7	7
India	5	2	2	1	8	3	+5	6
Pakistan	5	2	1	2	11	8	+3	5
Argentina	5	2	0	3	9	13	−4	4
United States	5	0	0	5	3	23	−20	0

20 July 1996
20:00

India	0–1	Argentina
	Report	P. Lombi 45'

Umpires:
Peter von Reth (NED)
Amin Ayman (EGY)

22 July 1996
17:30

Germany	1–1	India
Saliger 66'	Report	M. Kumar 62'

Umpires:
Roger St Rose (TRI)
Floris Idenburg (NED)

24 July 1996
09:00

United States	0–4	India
	Report	R. Singh 10'; Pillay 28', 46'; S. Kumar 69'

Umpires:
Craig Madden (GBR)
Guillaume Langle (FRA)

26 July 1996
17:30

Pakistan	0–0	India
	Report

Umpires:
Peter von Reth (NED)
Craig Madden (GBR)

28 July 1996
20:00

Spain	1–3	India
Escudé 33'	Report	Ferreira 21', 41'; Varkey 59'

Umpires:
Ray O'Connor (IRL)
Kiyoshi Sana (JPN)

Classification matches

Fifth to eighth place classification

Crossover

31 July 1996
11:00

India	3–3 (a.e.t.)	South Korea
R. Singh 14'; Ferreira 39'; Kumar 42'	Report	Shin Seok-kyo 22', 66'; Park Shin-heum 49'
Penalties
	3–5

Umpires:
Steve Horgan (USA)
Guillaume Langle (FRA)

Seventh and eighth place

2 August 1996
11:00

India	3–4	Great Britain
Dhillon 2'; R. Singh 29'; Powar 70'	Report	Shaw 24'; Laslett 43'; Wyatt 53'; Mayer 56'

Umpires:
Roger St. Rose (TRI)
Eduardo Ruiz (ARG)

8th Place Finish

== Judo ==
Athlete	Event	Round of 64	Round of 32	Round of 16	Quarter Finals	Semi Finals	Repachage		Final/BM
Athlete	Event	Round of 64	Round of 32	Round of 16	Quarter Finals	Semi Finals	Round 1	Round 2	Final/BM
Athlete	Event	Opposition Result	Opposition Result	Opposition Result	Opposition Result	Opposition Result	Opposition Result	Opposition Result	Opposition Result
Narender Singh	Men's 60 kg	Sullivan (IRL); Won	Bagirov (BLR); Loss	Did not advance					
Najib Aga	Men's 65 kg	—N/a	Csák (HUN); Loss	Did not advance			MacKinnon (RSA); Loss	Did not advance	
Sunith Thakur	Women's 52 kg	—N/a	Bye	Sugawara (JPN); Loss	Did not advance				
Arti Kohli	Women's 72 kg	—N/a	Rodriguez (CUB); Loss	Did not advance					

== Shooting ==
Athlete	Event	Qualification		Final	
Athlete	Event	Points	Rank	Points	Rank
Jaspal Rana	Men's 10 m Air Pistol	574	29	Did not advance	
Jaspal Rana	Men's 50 m Air Pistol	534	45	Did not advance	
Mansher Singh	Men's Trap	118	31	Did not advance	

== Swimming ==
Athlete	Event	Heats		Swim-Off		Final	
Athlete	Event	Time	Rank	Time	Rank	Time	Rank
Sebastian Xavier	Men's 50m Freestyle	23.80	44	Did not advance			
Sangeeta Puri	Women's 50m Freestyle	28.02	48	Did not advance			

== Table Tennis ==
Athlete	Event	Group stage				Round of 16	Quarterfinal	Semifinal	Final / BM	
Athlete	Event	Opposition Score	Opposition Score	Opposition Score	Rank	Opposition Score	Opposition Score	Opposition Score	Opposition Score	Rank
Chetan Baboor	Men's Singles	Chila (FRA); L 1–2	Kreanga (GRE); L 0–2	Toriola (NGR); L 1–2	4	Did not advance				
Ambika Radhika	Women's Singles	Bădescu (ROU); L 0–2	Paškauskienė (LTU); L 0–2	Vriesekoop (NED); L 0–2	4	Did not advance				

== Tennis ==
Athlete	Event	Round 64	Round 32	Round 16	Quarterfinals	Semifinals	Final / BM	
Athlete	Event	Opposition Result	Opposition Result	Opposition Result	Opposition Result	Opposition Result	Opposition Result	Rank
Leander Paes	Men's Singles	Reneberg (USA); W 6–7^{(2–7)}, 7–6^{(9–7)},1–0 ret	Pereira (VEN); W 6–2, 6–3	Enqvist (SWE); W 7–5, 7–6^{(7–3)}	Furlan (ITA); W 6–1, 7–5	Agassi (USA); L 6–7^{(5–7)}, 3–6	Meligeni (BRA); W 3–6, 6–2, 6–4	3rd place, bronze medalist(s)
Mahesh Bhupathi; Leander Paes	Men's Doubles	—N/a	Bing / Jiaping (CHN); W 4–6, 6–4, 6–4	Woodbridge / Woodforde (AUS); L 6–4, 2–6, 2–6	Did not advance			

== Weightlifting ==
Event	Athlete	Snatch	Clean & Jerk	Total	Rank
Badathala Adisekhar	Men's 54 kg	105.0	125.0	230.0	18
Raghavan Chanderasekaran	Men's 59 kg	112.5	140.0	252.5	11
Sandeep Kumar	Men's 64 kg	110.0	142.5	252.5	33
Samsudeen Kabeer	Men's 70 kg	125.0	150.0	275.0	23
Satheesha Rai	Men's 76 kg	140.0	177.5	317.4	15

== Wrestling ==
Athlete	Event	Round 1	Round 2	Round 3	Round 4	Round 5	Round 6	Final	
Athlete	Event	Round Type Opposition Result	Round Type Opposition Result	Round Type Opposition Result	Round Type Opposition Result	Round Type Opposition Result	Round Type Opposition Result	Round Type Opposition Result	Rank
Pappu Yadav	Men's Greco-Roman 52kg	1/16 Finals Ha Tae-yeon (KOR) Loss 0-4ST	Repachage Andriy Kalashnykov (UKR) Loss 0-4ST	did not advance					
