= Slovenia at the 1996 Summer Olympics =

- IOC code: SLO
- NOC: Olympic Committee of Slovenia
- Website: www.olympic.si (in Slovene and English)

in Atlanta
- Competitors: 37 (25 men and 12 women) in 8 sports
- Flag bearer: Brigita Bukovec
- Medals Ranked 55th: Gold 0 Silver 2 Bronze 0 Total 2

Summer Olympics appearances (overview)
- 1992; 1996; 2000; 2004; 2008; 2012; 2016; 2020; 2024

Other related appearances
- Austria (1912); Yugoslavia (1920–1988)

Slovenia was represented at the 1996 Summer Olympics in Atlanta, Georgia, United States by the Olympic Committee of Slovenia.

In total, 37 athletes including 25 men and 12 woman represented Slovenia in eight different sports including archery, athletics, canoeing, cycling, rowing, sailing, shooting and swimming.

Slovenia won a total of two medals at the games after Brigita Bukovec claimed silver in the women's 100 m hurdles and Andraž Vehovar also won silver in the canoeing men's slalom K-1.

== Competitors ==
In total, 37 athletes represented Slovenia at the 1996 Summer Olympics in Atlanta, Georgia, United States across eight different sports.

Sport	Men	Women	Total
Archery	3	0	3
Athletics	3	7	10
Canoeing	5	0	5
Cycling	1	0	1
Rowing	7	0	7
Sailing	2	3	5
Shooting	1	0	1
Swimming	3	2	5
Total	25	12	37

== Medalists ==
Slovenia won a total of two medals at the games after Brigita Bukovec claimed silver in the women's 100 m hurdles and Andraž Vehovar also won silver in the canoeing men's slalom K-1.

Medal	Name	Sport	Event
Silver	Brigita Bukovec	Athletics	Women's 100 metres Hurdles
Silver	Andraž Vehovar	Canoeing	Men's K1 Kayak Slalom Singles

== Archery ==
In total, three Slovenian athletes participated in the archery events – Peter Koprivnikar, Matevž Krumpestar and Samo Medved in the men's individual and the men's team.

Athlete	Event	Ranking round		Round of 64	Round of 32	Round of 16	Quarterfinals	Semifinals	Final	
Athlete	Event	Score	Seed	Score	Score	Score	Score	Score	Score	Rank
Peter Koprivnikar	Individual	652	54	Keith Hanlon (IRL); L 151-155	did not advance					
Matevž Krumpestar	Individual	643	64	Butch Johnson (USA); L 140-158	did not advance					
Samo Medved	Individual	656	14	Aleksandr Yatsenko (UKR); W 161-150	Jari Lipponen (FIN); W 161-161, 9-8	Paul Vermeiren (BEL); L 159-161	did not advance			
Peter Koprivnikar; Matevž Krumpestar; Samo Medved	Team	1951	8	—		Russia; W 242-241	South Korea; L 239-251	did not advance		

== Athletics ==
In total, 10 Slovenian athletes participated in the athletics events – Alenka Bikar in the women's 200 m, Britta Bilač in the women's high jump, Brigitta Bukovec in the women's 100 m hurdles, Gregor Cankar in the men's long jump, Helena Javornik in the women's marathon, Miro Kocuvan in the men's 400 m hurdles, Jerneja Perc in the women's 100 m, Ksenija Predikaka in the women's long jump, Igor Primc in the men's discus throw and Renata Strašek in the women's javelin throw.

Men
Track & road events

Athlete	Event	Heat		Quarterfinal		Semifinal		Final	
Athlete	Event	Result	Rank	Result	Rank	Result	Rank	Result	Rank
Miro Kocuvan	400 m hurdles	49.66	5	did not advance					

Field events

Athlete	Event	Qualification		Final	
Athlete	Event	Distance	Position	Distance	Position
Gregor Cankar	Long jump	8.00	12 Q	8.11	6
Igor Primc	Discus throw	59.12	24	did not advance	

Women
Track & road events

Athlete	Event	Heat		Quarterfinal		Semifinal		Final	
Athlete	Event	Result	Rank	Result	Rank	Result	Rank	Result	Rank
Alenka Bikar	200 m	22.88	3 Q	22.89	4 Q	22.82	7	did not advance	
Brigitta Bukovec	100 m hurdles	12.72	1 Q	12.66	1 Q	12.63	2 Q	12.59	Silver medal
Helena Javornik	Marathon	—						2:46.58	53
Jerneja Perc	100 m	11.63	6	did not advance					

Field events

Athlete	Event	Qualification		Final	
Athlete	Event	Distance	Position	Distance	Position
Britta Bilač	High jump	1.93m	7 q	1.93	10
Ksenija Predikaka	Long jump	6.37	21	did not advance	
Renata Strašek	Javelin throw	57.04	21	did not advance	

== Canoeing ==
In total, five Slovenian athletes participated in the canoeing events – Simon Hočevar and Gregor Terdič in the men's slalom C-1 and Jernej Abramič, Fedja Marušič and Andraž Vehovar in the men's slalom K-1.

Athlete	Event	Preliminary				Final	
Athlete	Event	Run 1	Rank	Run 2	Rank	Best	Rank
Simon Hočevar	Men's C-1	252.90	26	231.00	25	231.00	28
Gregor Terdič	Men's C-1	187.79	22	199.08	21	187.79	24
Jernej Abramič	Men's K-1	156.59	12	145.81	5	145.81	7
Fedja Marušič	Men's K-1	155.70	16	158.24	10	155.70	26
Andraž Vehovar	Men's K-1	145.38	4	141.65	1	141.65	Silver medal

== Cycling ==
In total, one Slovenian athlete participated in the cycling events – Robert Pintarič in the men's road race and the men's time trial.

Athlete	Event	Time	Rank
Robert Pintarič	Road race	4:56:08	70
Robert Pintarič	Time trial	1:12:35	32

== Rowing ==
In total, seven Slovenian athletes participated in the rowing events – Iztok Čop in the men's single sculls, Erik Tul and Luka Špik in the men's double sculls and Milan Janša, Sadik Mujkič, Denis Žvegelj and Janez Klemenčič in the men's coxless four.

Athlete	Event	Heats		Repechage		Semifinals C-D		Semifinals		Final	
Athlete	Event	Time	Rank	Time	Rank	Time	Rank	Time	Rank	Time	Rank
Iztok Čop	Single sculls	7:32.69	2 R	7:41.83	1 Q	—		7:15.07	2 Q	6:51.71	4
Erik Tul; Luka Špik	Double sculls	7:02.48	4 R	7:06.06	4 SC/D	6:56.43	3 FC	—		6:43.55	14
Milan Janša; Sadik Mujkič; Denis Žvegelj; Janez Klemenčič	Coxless four	6:15.86	2 Q	BYE		—		6:13.14	3Q	6:07.87	4

== Sailing ==
In total, five Slovenian athletes participated in the sailing events – Tomaž Čopi and Mitja Margon in the men's 470, Vesna Dekleva in the Europe and Janja Orel and Alenka Orel in the women's 470.

Men

Athlete	Event	Race											Net points	Final rank
Athlete	Event	1	2	3	4	5	6	7	8	9	10	11	Net points	Final rank
Tomaž Čopi; Mitja Margon	470	14	20	13	11	8	~~PMS~~	16	17	7	~~25~~	10	116.0	14

Women

Athlete	Event	Race											Net points	Final rank
Athlete	Event	1	2	3	4	5	6	7	8	9	10	11	Net points	Final rank
Vesna Dekleva	Europe	17	~~21~~	11	~~21~~	17	21	5	10	6	15	12	114.0	18
Janja Orel; Alenka Orel	470	20	~~21~~	17	14	20	19	13	~~21~~	7	15	18	143.0	19

== Shooting ==
In total, one Slovenian athlete participated in the shooting events – Rajmond Debevec in the men's 50 m rifle three positions, the men's 50 m rifle prone and men's 10 m air rifle.

Athlete	Event	Qualification		Final	
Athlete	Event	Score	Rank	Score	Rank
Rajmond Debevec	Men's 50 m rifle three positions	1166	9	did not advance	
Rajmond Debevec	Men's 50 m rifle prone	596	9	did not advance	
Rajmond Debevec	10 m air rifle	591	4 Q	692.1	6

== Swimming ==
In total, five Slovenian athletes participated in the swimming events – Jure Bučar in the men's 200 m freestyle and the men's 400 m freestyle, Igor Majcen in the men's 1,500 m freestyle, Peter Mankoč in the men's 100 m butterfly and the men's 200 m individual medley, Alenka Kejžar in the women's 200 m breaststroke and the women's 200 m individual medley and Metka Šparovec in the women's 50 m freestyle and the women's 100 m freestyle.

Men

Athlete	Event	Heat		Final B		Final	
Athlete	Event	Time	Rank	Time	Rank	Time	Rank
Jure Bučar	200 m freestyle	1:54.75	34	did not advance			
Jure Bučar	400 m freestyle	3:57.36	20	did not advance			
Igor Majcen	1,500 m freestyle	16:10.81	28	did not advance			
Peter Mankoč	100 m butterfly	55.59	36	did not advance			
Peter Mankoč	200 m individual medley	DSQ		did not advance			

Women

Athlete	Event	Heat		Final B		Final	
Athlete	Event	Time	Rank	Time	Rank	Time	Rank
Alenka Kejžar	200 m breaststroke	2:33.34	20	did not advance			
Alenka Kejžar	200 m individual medley	2:18.39	19	did not advance			
Metka Šparovec	50 m freestyle	26.43	25	did not advance			
Metka Šparovec	100 m freestyle	57.66	28	did not advance			
