= Archery at the 1996 Summer Olympics – Men's individual =

Archery at the Olympics

Men's individual at the Games of the XXVI Olympiad
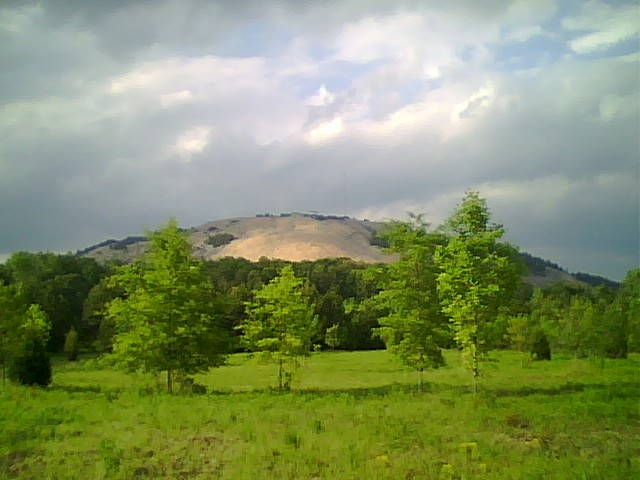
- Site of the former Archery Center at Stone Mountain, where the event took place
- Venue: Stone Mountain Park Archery Center
- Dates: 28 July – 1 August 1996
- Competitors: 64

Medalists
1st place, gold medalist(s)		Justin Huish	United States
2nd place, silver medalist(s)		Magnus Petersson	Sweden
3rd place, bronze medalist(s)		Oh Kyo-Moon	South Korea

The men's individual was an archery event held as part of the Archery at the 1996 Summer Olympics programme. Like other archery events at the Olympics, it featured the recurve discipline. All archery was done at a range of 70 metres. 64 archers competed.

The same competition format as in 1992 was used, though there were some significant changes. The competition began with a 72-arrow ranking round (down from 144 arrows in 1992). This was followed by three elimination rounds (up from two in 1992), in which archers competed head-to-head in 18-arrow matches (up from 12 arrows in 1992). After these rounds, there were 8 archers left. The quarterfinals, semifinals, and medal matches (collectively termed the "finals round") were 12-arrow matches. In all matches, losers were eliminated and received a final rank determined by their score in that round, with the exception of the semifinals. The losers of the semifinals competed in the bronze medal match.

== Records ==
Michele Frangilli's score of 170 in the round of 16 was an Olympic record for 18 arrows. Oh Kyo-Moon's score of 336 was an Olympic record for 36 arrows, R32 and R16 combined. Oh's score of 115 in the bronze medal match was an Olympic record for a 12-arrow match, as well as combining with the 114 and 109 to set a world record at 338 for the 36 arrow final round.

== Results ==
Rank	Archer	Nation	Ranking round
1	Michele Frangilli	Italy	684
2	Jang Yong-Ho	South Korea	682
3	Oh Kyo-Moon	South Korea	681
4	Vadim Shikarev	Kazakhstan	677
5	Jari Lipponen	Finland	676
6	Balzhinima Tsyrempilov	Russia	675
7	Magnus Petersson	Sweden	672
8	Jackson Fear	Australia	671
9	Justin Huish	United States	670
10	Matteo Bisiani	Italy	669
11	Kim Bo-ram	South Korea	668
12	Rod White	United States	666
13	Hiroshi Yamamoto	Japan	665
14	Tang Hua	China	664
15	Richard Johnson	United States	664
16	Stanislav Zabrodsky	Ukraine	664
17	Steven Hallard	Great Britain	664
18	Matthew Gray	Australia	663
19	Martinus Grov	Norway	663
20	Simon Fairweather	Australia	660
21	Paul Vermeiren	Belgium	659
22	Mikael Larsson	Sweden	659
23	Valeriy Yevetskiy	Ukraine	659
24	Gary Hardinges	Great Britain	658
25	Takayoshi Matsushita	Japan	657
26	Damien Letulle	France	657
27	Kevin Sally	Canada	657
28	Samo Medved	Slovenia	656
29	José Anchondo	Mexico	653
30	Paweł Szymczak	Poland	653
31	Peter Koprivnikar	Slovenia	652
32	Lalremsanga Chhangte	India	650
33	Andrew Lindsay	New Zealand	650
34	Keith Hanlon	Ireland	650
35	Nuno Pombo	Portugal	650
36	Raul Kivilo	Estonia	649
37	Oleksandr Yatsenko	Ukraine	649
38	Tomi Poikolainen	Finland	648
39	Andrea Parenti	Italy	647
40	Göran Bjerendal	Sweden	646
41	Cho Sheng-ling	Chinese Taipei	646
42	Wu Tsung-yi	Chinese Taipei	646
43	Rob Rusnov	Canada	645
44	Limba Ram	India	644
45	Lionel Torres	France	644
46	Sébastien Flute	France	644
47	Shen Jun	China	644
48	Tommi Tuovila	Finland	644
49	Jubzhang Jubzhang	Bhutan	643
50	Matevž Krumpestar	Slovenia	643
51	Andrey Podlazov	Russia	640
52	Adolfo González	Mexico	636
53	Bair Badënov	Russia	635
54	Jeannot Robitaille	Canada	634
55	Skalzang Dorje	India	634
56	Sergei Martynov	Kazakhstan	632
57	Hsieh Sheng-feng	Chinese Taipei	630
58	Luo Hengyu	China	627
59	Vitaly Shin	Kazakhstan	626
60	Antonio Vázquez	Spain	621
61	Okyay Küçükkayalar	Turkey	618
62	Stefan Mlyakov	Bulgaria	617
63	Paolo Tura	San Marino	592
64	Dominic Rebelo	Kenya	518

=== Competition bracket ===
==== Section 1 ====
Round of 64
1	Michele Frangilli (ITA)	166
64	Dominic Rebelo (KEN)	142
32	Lalremsanga Chhangte (IND)	160
33	Andrew Lindsay (NZL)	156
16	Stanislav Zabrodsky (UKR)	156^{9}
49	Jubzhang Jubzhang (BHU)	156^{8}
17	Steven Hallard (GBR)	150
48	Tommi Tuovila (FIN)	151
8	Jackson Fear (AUS)	162
57	Hsieh Sheng-Feng (TPE)	164
25	Takayoshi Matsushita (JPN)	163
40	Goran Bjerendal (SWE)	162
9	Justin Huish (USA)	165
56	Sergei Martynov (KAZ)	157
24	Gary Hardinges (GBR)	158^{10}
41	Cho Sheng-Ling (TPE)	158^{9}

Round of 32
1	Michele Frangilli (ITA)	164
32	Lalremsanga Chhangte (IND)	158
16	Stanislav Zabrodsky (UKR)	163
48	Tommi Tuovila (FIN)	142
57	Hsieh Sheng-Feng (TPE)	157
25	Takayoshi Matsushita (JPN)	156
9	Justin Huish (USA)	166
24	Gary Hardinges (GBR)	155

Round of 16
1	Michele Frangilli (ITA)	170
16	Stanislav Zabrodsky (UKR)	160
57	Hsieh Sheng-Feng (TPE)	162
9	Justin Huish (USA)	169

Quarterfinals
1	Michele Frangilli (ITA)	112^{9}
9	Justin Huish (USA)	112^{10}

==== Section 2 ====
Round of 64
4	Vadim Chikarev (KAZ)	166
61	Okyay Kucukkayalar (TUR)	144
29	Jose Anchondo (MEX)	158
36	Raul Kivilo (EST)	157
13	Hiroshi Yamamoto (JPN)	155
52	Adolfo Gonzalez (MEX)	154
20	Simon Fairweather (AUS)	154
45	Lionel Torres (FRA)	165
5	Jari Lipponen (FIN)	168
60	Antonio Vazquez (ESP)	143
28	Samo Medved (SLO)	161
37	Aleksandr Yatsenko (UKR)	150
12	Rod White (USA)	161
53	Bair Badënov (RUS)	152
21	Paul Vermeiren (BEL)	165
44	Limba Ram (IND)	140

Round of 32
4	Vadim Chikarev (KAZ)	154
29	Jose Anchondo (MEX)	156
13	Hiroshi Yamamoto (JPN)	163
45	Lionel Torres (FRA)	164
5	Jari Lipponen (FIN)	161^{8}
28	Samo Medved (SLO)	161^{9}
12	Rod White (USA)	158
21	Paul Vermeiren (BEL)	159

Round of 16
29	Jose Anchondo (MEX)	158
45	Lionel Torres (FRA)	159
28	Samo Medved (SLO)	159
21	Paul Vermeiren (BEL)	161

Quarterfinals
45	Lionel Torres (FRA)	106
21	Paul Vermeiren (BEL)	111

==== Section 3 ====
Round of 64
3	Oh Kyo-Moon (KOR)	162
62	Stefan Mliakov (BUL)	156
30	Paweł Szymczak (POL)	152
35	Nuno Pombo (POR)	148
19	Martinus Grov (NOR)	161
46	Sebastien Flute (FRA)	158
14	Tang Hua (CHN)	157
51	Andrey Podlazov (RUS)	154
6	Balzhinima Tsyrempilov (RUS)	164
59	Vitaliy Shin (KAZ)	163
27	Kevin Sally (CAN)	155
38	Tomi Poikolainen (FIN)	158
22	Mikael Larsson (SWE)	167
43	Rob Rusnov (CAN)	155
11	Kim Bo-Ram (KOR)	168
54	Jeannot Robitaille (CAN)	160

Round of 32
3	Oh Kyo-Moon (KOR)	169
30	Paweł Szymczak (POL)	154
19	Martinus Grov (NOR)	161
14	Tang Hua (CHN)	159
6	Balzhinima Tsyrempilov (RUS)	163
38	Tomi Poikolainen (FIN)	164
22	Mikael Larsson (SWE)	160
11	Kim Bo-Ram (KOR)	166

Round of 16
3	Oh Kyo-Moon (KOR)	167
19	Martinus Grov (NOR)	159
38	Tomi Poikolainen (FIN)	160
11	Kim Bo-Ram (KOR)	162

Quarterfinals
3	Oh Kyo-Moon (KOR)	114
11	Kim Bo-Ram (KOR)	113

==== Section 4 ====
Round of 64
7	Magnus Petersson (SWE)	167
58	Luo Hengyu (CHN)	161
26	Damien Letulle (FRA)	150
39	Andrea Parenti (ITA)	161
23	Valeriy Yevetsky (UKR)	159
42	Wu Tsung-Yi (TPE)	156
10	Matteo Bisiani (ITA)	167
55	Skalzang Dorje (IND)	156
15	Richard Johnson (USA)	158
50	Matevž Krumpestar (SLO)	140
18	Matthew Gray (AUS)	162
47	Shen Jun (CHN)	158
31	Peter Koprivnikar (SLO)	151
34	Keith Hanlon (IRL)	155
2	Jang Yong-Ho (KOR)	164
63	Paolo Tura (SMR)	141

Round of 32
7	Magnus Petersson (SWE)	167
39	Andrea Parenti (ITA)	155
23	Valeriy Yevetsky (UKR)	152
10	Matteo Bisiani (ITA)	163
15	Richard Johnson (USA)	164
18	Matthew Gray (AUS)	157
34	Keith Hanlon (IRL)	159
2	Jang Yong-Ho (KOR)	165

Round of 16
7	Magnus Petersson (SWE)	167
10	Matteo Bisiani (ITA)	163
15	Richard Johnson (USA)	160
2	Jang Yong-Ho (KOR)	162

Quarterfinals
7	Magnus Petersson (SWE)	111
2	Jang Yong-Ho (KOR)	108

==== Finals ====
Semifinals
Justin Huish (USA)	112
Paul Vermeiren (BEL)	103
Oh Kyo-Moon (KOR)	109
Magnus Petersson (SWE)	112

Final
Justin Huish (USA)	112
Magnus Petersson (SWE)	107
Bronze medal match
Oh Kyo-Moon (KOR)	115
Paul Vermeiren (BEL)	110

== Sources ==
- Official Report
- Wudarski, Pawel (1999). "Wyniki Igrzysk Olimpijskich" (in Polish). Archived from the original on 18 January 2008.
