= Archery at the 1996 Summer Olympics – Men's team =

Archery at the Olympics

Men's team at the Games of the XXVI Olympiad
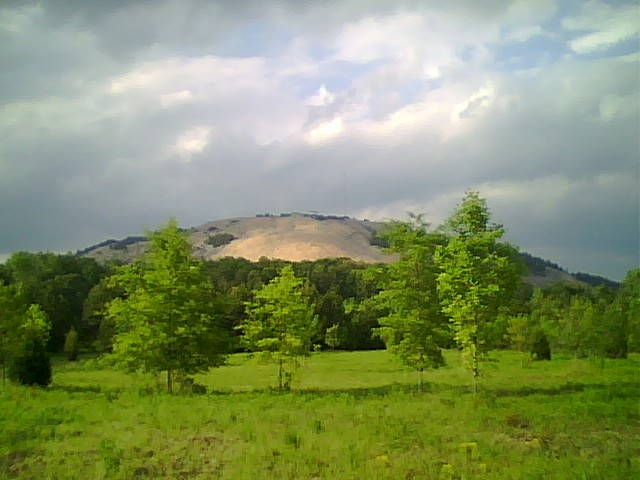
- Site of the former Archery Center at Stone Mountain, where the event took place
- Venue: Stone Mountain Park Archery Center
- Dates: 28 July – 2 August 1996
- Competitors: 45 from 15 nations

Medalists
1st place, gold medalist(s)		Justin Huish; Richard Johnson; Rod White	United States
2nd place, silver medalist(s)		Jang Yong-Ho; Kim Bo-Ram; Oh Kyo-Moon	South Korea
3rd place, bronze medalist(s)		Matteo Bisiani; Michele Frangilli; Andrea Parenti	Italy

The men's team was an archery event held as part of the Archery at the 1996 Summer Olympics programme.

== Results ==
The ranking for the men's teams was determined by summing the ranking round scores of the three members.

=== Ranking round ===
Rank	Nation	Archers	Score
1	South Korea	Jang Yong-Ho; Kim Bo-Ram; Oh Kyo-Moon	2031
2	Italy	Matteo Bisiani; Michele Frangilli; Andrea Parenti	2000
3	United States	Justin Huish; Butch Johnson; Rod White	2000
4	Australia	Simon Fairweather; Jackson Fear; Matthew Gray	1994
5	Sweden	Goran Bjerendal; Mikael Larsson; Magnus Petersson	1977
6	Ukraine	Oleksandr Yatsenko; Valeriy Yevetsky; Stanislav Zabrodsky	1972
7	Finland	Jari Lipponen; Tomi Poikolainen; Tommi Tuovila	1968
8	Slovenia	Peter Koprivnikar; Matevž Krumpestar; Samo Medved	1951
9	Russia	Bair Badënov; Andrey Podlazov; Balzhinima Tsyrempilov	1950
10	France	Sébastien Flute; Damien Letulle; Lionel Torres	1945
11	Canada	Jeannot Robitaille; Rob Rusnov; Kevin Sally	1936
12	Kazakhstan	Vadim Shikarev; Sergei Martynov; Vitaliy Shin	1935
13	China	Luo Hengyu; Shen Jun; Tang Hua	1935
14	India	Lalremsanga Chhangte; Skalzang Dorje; Limba Ram	1928
15	Chinese Taipei	Cho Sheng-Ling; Hsieh Sheng-Feng; Wu Tsung-Yi	1921

=== Knockout stage ===
Round of 16
Slovenia	242
Russia	241
Sweden	247
Kazakhstan	239
Australia	243
China	240
United States	251
India	235
Ukraine	238
Canada	225
Finland	245
France	244
Italy	244
Chinese Taipei	243

Quarterfinals
South Korea	251
Slovenia	239
Sweden	241
Australia	253
United States	251
Ukraine	240
Finland	236
Italy	252

Semifinals
South Korea	250
Australia	234
United States	251
Italy	247

Final
South Korea	249
United States	251
Bronze medal match
Italy	248
Australia	244

Final

In addition to winning the gold medal, the United States team accomplished another highly unusual feat: the team shot the same score in all four rounds of team competition.

== Sources ==
- Official Report
- Wudarski, Pawel (1999). "Wyniki Igrzysk Olimpijskich" (in Polish). Archived from the original on 18 January 2008.
