= Belgium at the 1996 Summer Olympics =

- IOC code: BEL
- NOC: Belgian Olympic and Interfederal Committee
- Website: www.teambelgium.be (in Dutch and French)

in Atlanta
- Competitors: 61 (41 men, 20 women) in 14 sports
- Flag bearer: Jean-Michel Saive (table tennis)
- Medals Ranked 31st: Gold 2 Silver 2 Bronze 2 Total 6

Summer Olympics appearances (overview)
- 1900; 1904; 1908; 1912; 1920; 1924; 1928; 1932; 1936; 1948; 1952; 1956; 1960; 1964; 1968; 1972; 1976; 1980; 1984; 1988; 1992; 1996; 2000; 2004; 2008; 2012; 2016; 2020; 2024; 2028

Other related appearances
- 1906 Intercalated Games

Belgium competed at the 1996 Summer Olympics in Atlanta, United States.

== Medalists ==
Medal	Name	Sport	Event	Date
Gold	Ulla Werbrouck	Judo	Women's 72 kg	21 July
Gold	Fred Deburghgraeve	Swimming	Men's 100 m breaststroke	20 July
Silver	Gella Vandecaveye	Judo	Women's 61 kg	23 July
Silver	Sébastien Godefroid	Sailing	Men's Finn class	2 August
Bronze	Harry Van Barneveld	Judo	Men's +95 kg	20 July
Bronze	Marisabel Lomba	Judo	Women's 56 kg	24 July

== Archery ==
Veteran Paul Vermeiren was once again the only Belgian archer to compete in the nation's seventh appearance in the modern Olympic archery tournament. He advanced all the way to the semifinals before being defeated. In the bronze medal match, he was again defeated to finish with fourth place.

Athlete	Event	Ranking round		Round of 64	Round of 32	Round of 16	Quarterfinals	Semifinals	Final / BM	
Athlete	Event	Score	Seed	Opposition Score	Opposition Score	Opposition Score	Opposition Score	Opposition Score	Opposition Score	Rank
Paul Vermeiren	Men's individual	659	21	Ram (IND); W 165–104	White (USA); W 159–158	Medved (SLO); W 161–159	Torres (FRA); W 111–106	Huish (USA); L 103–112	Oh (KOR); L 110–115	4

== Athletics ==
Key

- Note–Ranks given for track events are within the athlete's heat only
- Q = Qualified for the next round by position in race or, in field events, by achieving the automatic qualification target
- q = Qualified for the next round as a fastest loser or, in field events, by position without achieving the qualifying target

Men
Track and road events

Athlete	Event	Heat		Quarterfinal		Semifinal		Final	
Athlete	Event	Time	Rank	Time	Rank	Time	Rank	Time	Rank
Patrick Stevens	200 m	20.60	1 Q	20.43	2 Q	20.46	4 Q	20.27	7
Erik Wymeersch	200 m	20.68	1 Q	20.59	4	did not advance			
Marc Dollendorf	400 m hurdles	—N/a		49.49	2 Q	48.91	8	did not advance	
Jean-Paul Bruwier	400 m hurdles	—N/a		49.69	6	did not advance			
Eddy Hellebuyck	Marathon	—N/a						2:25.04	67

Women
Track and road events

Athlete	Event	Heat		Quarterfinal		Semifinal		Final	
Athlete	Event	Time	Rank	Time	Rank	Time	Rank	Time	Rank
Ann Mercken	400 m hurdles	—N/a		55.88	3 Q	54.95	6	did not advance	
Marleen Renders	Marathon	—N/a						2:36.27	25

== Cycling ==
=== Mountain biking ===
Athlete	Event	Time	Rank
Roel Paulissen	Men's cross-country	2:33:53	17th

=== Road ===
Men

Athlete	Event	Time	Rank
Johan Museeuw	Road race	04:55:25	10th
Wilfried Peeters	Road race	04:56:28	15th
Frank Vandenbroucke	Road race	04:56:44	25th
Johan Bruyneel	Road race	04:56:47	60th
Tom Steels	Road race	04:56:56	109th
Johan Bruyneel	Time Trial	01:10:12	24th

Women

Athlete	Event	Time	Rank
Heidi Van De Vijver	Road race	02:37:06	20th

=== Track ===
Athlete	Event	Points	Rank
Etienne De Wilde	Points race	0 pts	24th

== Equestrian ==
=== Eventing ===
Athlete	Horse	Event	Dressage		Cross-country			Jumping			Total	
Athlete	Horse	Event	Penalties	Rank	Penalties	Total	Rank	Penalties	Total	Rank	Penalties	Rank
Constantin Van Rijckevorsel	Otis	Individual	55.8	22	21.60	77.40	4	10.00	87.40	11	87.40	8

=== Jumping ===
Athlete	Horse	Event	Qualification								Final		
Athlete	Horse	Event	Round 1		Round 2			Round 3			Final		
Athlete	Horse	Event	Penalties	Rank	Penalties	Total	Rank	Penalties	Total	Rank	Penalties	Jump off	Rank
Eric Wauters	Bon Ami	Individual	4.00	=14	16.00	20.00	=45	37.50	57.50	67	did not advance		
Stanny Van Paesschen	Mulga Bill	Individual	12.00	=58	12.00	24.00	=52	8.00	32.00	=50	did not advance		
Michel Blaton	Revoulino	Individual	9.00	=54	17.75	26.75	=62	8.50	35.25	53	did not advance		
Ludo Philippaerts	King Darco	Individual	0.00	=1	4.00	4.00	=5	0.00	4.00	3	16.00	—N/a	20
Eric Wauters; Stanny Van Paesschen; Michel Blaton; Ludo Philippaerts	See above	Team	—N/a								48.50	—N/a	13

== Gymnastics ==
Athlete	Event	Preliminaries						Semifinals						Final					
Athlete	Event	Rope	Ball	Clubs	Ribbon	Total	Rank	Rope	Ball	Clubs	Ribbon	Total	Rank	Rope	Ball	Clubs	Ribbon	Total	Rank
Cindy Stollenberg	Individual	9.033	9.166	9.149	9.116	36.464	31	did not advance											

== Judo ==
Men

Athlete	Event	Round of 64	Round of 32	Round of 16	Quarterfinal	Semifinal	Repechage 1	Repechage 2	Repechage 3	Final / BM	
Athlete	Event	Opposition Result	Opposition Result	Opposition Result	Opposition Result	Opposition Result	Opposition Result	Opposition Result	Opposition Result	Opposition Result	Rank
Philip Laats	–65 kg	Bye	Revazishvili (GEO); W	Fuentes (USA); W	Lewak (POL); W	Quellmalz (GER); L	Bye			Guimarães (BRA); L	=5
Johan Laats	–78 kg	Bye	Radulović (YUG); W	Dott (GER); L	Did not advance		Ricky Dixon (NIC); W	Iraklı Uznadze (TUR); L	Did not advance		
Harry Van Barneveld	+95 kg	Moreno (CUB); W	Douillet (BEL); L	Did not advance			Muller (LUX); W	Krieger (AUT); W	Papaioannou (GRE); W	Shenggang (CHN); W	3rd place, bronze medalist(s)

Women

Athlete	Event	Round of 32	Round of 16	Quarterfinal	Semifinal	Repechage 1	Repechage 2	Repechage 3	Final / BM	
Athlete	Event	Opposition Result	Opposition Result	Opposition Result	Opposition Result	Opposition Result	Opposition Result	Opposition Result	Opposition Result	Rank
Heidi Goossens	–52 kg	Restoux (FRA); L	Did not advance							
Marisabel Lomba	–56 kg	Bye	Jung (KOR); L	Did not advance		Bye	Mizoguchi (JPN); W	Huseynova (AZE); W	Liu (CHN); W	3rd place, bronze medalist(s)
Gella Vandecaveye	–61 kg	Bye	Tbessi (TUN); W	Griffith (VEN); W	Jung (KOR); W	Bye			Emoto (JPN); L	2nd place, silver medalist(s)
Ulla Werbrouck	–72 kg	Bye	Galante (RUS); W	Curto (ESP); W	Beliaieva (UKR); W	Bye			Tanabe (JPN); W	1st place, gold medalist(s)

== Sailing ==
Athlete	Event	Race										Score	Rank
Athlete	Event	1	2	3	4	5	6	7	8	9	10	Score	Rank
Sébastien Godefroid	Finn class	13	24	5	5	4	3	16	7	2	6	32 pts	Silver medal

== Shooting ==
Men

Athlete	Event	Qualification		Final	
Athlete	Event	Score	Rank	Score	Rank
Philippe Dupont	Trap	119	=20	did not advance	
Philippe Dupont	Double trap	128	=22	did not advance	
Frans Peeters	Trap	114	=49	did not advance	

Women

Athlete	Event	Qualification		Final	
Athlete	Event	Score	Rank	Score	Rank
Cindy Bouque	10 m air rifle	389	25	did not advance	
Anne Focan	Double trap	91	20	did not advance	

== Swimming ==
Key

- Q = Qualified for Final A
- q = Qualified for Final B

Men

Athlete	Event	Heat		Final	
Athlete	Event	Time	Rank	Time	Rank
Fred Deburghgraeve	100m Breaststroke	1:00.60	1 Q	1:00.65	1st place, gold medalist(s)
Fred Deburghgraeve	200m Breaststroke	2:16.10	15 q	Withdrew	

Women

Athlete	Event	Heat		Final	
Athlete	Event	Time	Rank	Time	Rank
Brigitte Becue	100m breaststroke	1:09.83	8 Q	1:09.79	8
Brigitte Becue	200m breaststroke	2:29.62	6 Q	2:28.36	7
Brigitte Becue	200m individual medley	2:18.28	17 q	Withdrew	
Sandra Cam	200m freestyle	2:04.90	26	did not advance	
Sandra Cam	400m freestyle	4:17.35	17 q	4:14.94	10
Sandra Cam	800m freestyle	8:48.33	16	did not advance	
Yseult Gervy	100m backstroke	1:05.72	25	did not advance	
Yseult Gervy	200m backstroke	1:05.72	22	did not advance	
Yseult Gervy	400m individual medley	4:53.11	16 q	4:52.89	15

== Tennis ==
Athlete	Event	1st Round	2nd Round	3rd Round	Quarter-finals	Semi-finals	Final
Athlete	Event	Opposition Score	Opposition Score	Opposition Score	Opposition Score	Opposition Score	Opposition Score
Sabine Appelmans	Women's Singles	N Zvereva (BLR); L 7–5, 6-3	did not advance				
Dominique Van Roost	Women's Singles	A Sánchez Vicario (ESP); L 6–1, 7-5	did not advance				
Laurence Courtois	Women's Singles	A Kournikova (RUS); W 1–6, 6–2, 6-2	K Habšudová (SVK); L 7–5, 6-2	did not advance			
Sabine Appelmans; Laurence Courtois	Women's doubles	G Sabatini (ARG) / P Tarabini (ARG); W 5–7, 6-3, 6-4	M Hingis (SUI) / P Schnyder (SUI); L 2–6, 6-1, 7-5	—N/a	did not advance		

== Wrestling ==
Men's Greco-Roman

Athlete	Event	Round 1	Eightfinals	Quarterfinals	Semifinals	Final	Repechage 2 Round	Repechage 3 Round	Repechage 4 Round	Repechage 5 Round	Repechage 6 Round	Bronze Medal Finals	Rank
Athlete	Event	Opposition Result	Opposition Result	Opposition Result	Opposition Result	Opposition Result	Opposition Result	Opposition Result	Opposition Result	Opposition Result	Opposition Result	Opposition Result	Rank
Jean-Pierre Wafflard	-82 kg	Tsilent (BLR); L 0-10	did not advance				Frinta (CZE); L 0-2	did not advance					17
