= RC44 World Championship =

World Championship in the Musto Skiff Class

The RC44 World Championship is an annual international sailing regatta for RC44 they are organized by the host club on behalf of the International Class Association and recognized by World Sailing, the sports IOC recognized governing body.

== Events ==
Event			Host			Boats	Sailors					Ref.
Ed.	Dates	Year	Host club	Location	Country	Boats	No.	M	F	Nat.	Cont.	Ref.
1	10–16 Oct	2010		Yaiza-Puerto Calero	Spain	13	114			20	6	
2	15–20 Nov	2011		Yaiza-Puerto Calero	Spain	14	124			21	5	
3	3–7 Oct	2012		Rovinj	Croatia	15	126			22	6	
4	20–24 Nov	2013	Puerto Calero Marinas	Yaiza-Puerto Calero	Spain	15	123			19	6	
5	12–17 Aug	2014	Royal Gothenburg Yacht Club	Marstrand	Sweden	12	105			16	5	
6	30 Sept – 4 Oct	2015	Clube Naval de Cascais	Cascais	Portugal	12	98			17	5	
7	11–15 May	2016	Real Club Marítimo de Sotogrande	Sotogrande	Spain	10	79			16	5	
8	9–13 Aug	2017	Royal Gothenburg Yacht Club	Marstrand	Sweden	9	74			14	5	
9	27–30 Sept	2018	Clube Naval de Cascais	Cascais	Portugal	8	67			14	4	
10	9–13 July	2019	Clube Naval de Cascais	Cascais	Portugal	9	74			13	4	
N/A	23 - 27 Sept	2020		Portorož	Slovenia	CANCELLED COVID						
11	7–14 Oct	2021	Yacht Club Isole di Toscana	Scarlino	Italy	9				9+	4+	
12	12–16 Oct	2022		Portorož	Slovenia	8	65			15	4	
13	– 13 Aug	2023	Royal Yacht Squadron	Cowes	United Kingdom	9	83			16	5	
14	– Aug	2024		Brunnen, Lake Lucerne	Switzerland	9	84	74	10	17	5	
15	27 – 31 Aug	2025	RJachtclub Scheveningen	The Hague	Netherlands	11	99	88	11	20	4	
16	Sept	2026	Royal Yacht Squadron	Cowes	United Kingdom	9	84	74	10	20	5	

== Multiple World Champions ==
Compiled from the data below the table includes up to and including 2026 the 2021 records are incomplete.

Ranking	Sailor	Gold	Silver	Bronze	Total	No. Entries"	Ref.
1	Vladimir Prosikhin (RUS)	5	1	1	7	14	
2	Jeremy Lomas (NZL)	4	1	1	6	7	
3	Jaro Furlani (ITA)	3	3	3	9	15	
4	Ivan Peute (NED)	3	2	0	5	14	
5	Pietro Mantovani (ITA)	3	1	4	8	11	
6	Michele Ivaldi (ITA)	3	1	2	6	14	
7	Iztok Knafelc (SLO)	3	1	1	5	11	
7	Mitja Margon (SLO)	3	1	1	5	11	
9	Tomaz Copi (SLO)	3	1	0	4	9	
9	Hamish Pepper (NZL)	3	1	0	4	6	
9	Ryan Godfrey (AUS)	3	1	0	4	8	
12	James "Skip" Baxter (NZL)	3	0	1	4	8	

== Medalists ==
Year	Gold	Silver	Bronze	Ref.
2010	Oracle Racing - USA 17 Anders Myralf (DEN) (Fleet Racing); James Spithill (AUS); Joey Newton (AUS); James Baxter (NZL); Piet Van Nieuwenhuijzen (NED); Kyle Langford (AUS); Jonas Hviid-Nielsen (DEN); Matt Von Bibra (AUS); Bryce Ruthenberg (AUS) (Match Racing)	BMW Oracle Racing USA Larry Ellison (USA); Russell Coutts (NZL); Dirk de Ridder (NED); Ross Halcrow (NZL); Craig Phillips (AUS); Colin Orsini (USA); Revelin Minihane (IRL); Ryan Godfrey (AUS)	No Way Back NED Pieter Heerema (NED); Ray Davies (NZL); Hervé Cunningham (FRA); Frederik Sparvath (DEN); Chresten Plinius (DEN); Martin Kirketerp Isben (DEN); Frederik Aurell (SWE); Lasse Berthelsen (NOR)	
2011	Artemist - SWE 22 Torbjorn Tornqvist (SWE); Terry Hutchinson (USA); Andy Fethers (NZL); Mark Towill (USA); Ivan Peute (NED); Chris Welch (USA); Noel Drennan (AUS); Morgan Trubovich (NZL)	Ironbound - USA 1 (23) David Murphy (USA); Peter Evans (NZL); Warwick Fleury (NZL); Jon Gundersen (NZL); Eric Junge (USA); Justin Clougher (AUS); Vann Walke (USA); David Tank (USA)	Peninsula Petroleum Sailing Team - GBR 1 John Bassadone (GBR); Iñaki Castañer (ESP); Pietro Mantovani (ITA); Miguel Jáuregui (ESP); Robin Imaz (ESP); German Panei (ARG); Oliver Gòngora (ESP); Mikel Pasabant (ESP)	
2012	GBR 1 - Peninsula Petroleum John Bassadone (GBR); Vasco Vascotto (ITA); Mikel Pasabant (ESP); Oliver Gongora (ESP); German Panei (ARG); Miguel Jauregui (ESP); Robin Imaz (ESP); Pablo Rosano (ESP)	GBR 2041- Aqua Chris Baker (GBR); Cameron Appleton (NZL); Andrew Estcourt (NZL); Christian Kamp (DEN); Benjamin Graham-Evans (GBR); Chris Noble (GBR); Mark Towill (USA); Matt Cassidy (USA)	SLO 11 - Ceeref Igor Lah (SLO); Michele Ivaldi (ITA); Michele Cannoni (ITA); Don Cowie (NZL); Sarah Callahan (USA); Kazuhiko Sofuku (JPN); Maciel Cicchetti (ITA); Tine Lah (SLO); Jaro Furlani (ITA)	
2013	SLO - Ceeref Igor Lah (SLO); Michele Ivaldi (ITA); Michele Cannoni (ITA); Sarah Callahan (USA); Kazuhiko Sofuku (JPN); Jaro Furlani (ITA); Maciel Cicchetti (ITA); Jani Klemencic (SLO); Paul Westlake (AUS)	GBR - Peninsula Petroleum John Bassadone (GBR); Vasco Vascotto (ITA); Mikel Pasabant (ESP); Oliver Gongora (ESP); German Panei (ARG); Miguel Jauregui (ESP); Robin Imaz (ESP); Pablo Rosano (ESP)	GBR - Aqua Chris Bake (GBR); Cameron Appleton (NZL); Andrew Estcourt (NZL); Christian Kamp (DEN); Benjamin Graham-Evans (GBR); Chris Noble (sailor)Chris Noble (GBR); Matt Cassidy (USA); Mark Towill (USA)|-	
2014	Bronenosec Sailing Team - RUS 18 Vladimir Liubomirov (RUS); Michele Ivaldi (ITA); Alberto Barovier (ITA); Maciel Cicchetti (ITA); Polina Liubomirova (RUS); Vladimir Ikonnikov (RUS); Alexey Kulakov (RUS); Pietro Mantovani (ITA); Oleg Krivov (RUS)	Charisma - MON Nico Poons (NED); Tom Slingsby (AUS); Ivan Peute (NED); Jaro Furlani (SLO); Ross Halcrow (NZL); Dimitri Simons (NED); Giles Scott (GBR); Chris Hosking (AUS)	Aqua - GBR Chris Bake (GBR); Cameron Appleton (NZL); Andrew Estcourt (NZL); Ben Graham (GBR); Chris Noble (GBR); Matt Cassidy (USA); Simon Johnson (IRL); Jonathan Swain (RSA)	
2015 Cascais	Nika - RUS 10 Vladimir Prosikhin (RUS); Dean Barker (NZL); Tomaz Copi (SLO); Mitja Margon (SLO); Darko Hajdinjak (CRO); Iztok Knafelc (SLO); Sean Clarkson (NZL); Jeremy Lomas (NZL)	Bronenosec - RUS Vladimir Liubomirov (RUS); Michele Ivaldi (ITA); Paul Westlake (AUS); Maciel Cicchetti (ITA); Vladimir Ikonnikov (RUS); Polina Liubomirova (RUS); Pietro Mantovani (ITA); Alberto Barovier (ITA)	Ceeref - SLO Igor Lah (SLO); Adrian Stead (GBR); Dirk De Ridder (NED); Jon Gundersen (NZL); Jaro Furlani (SLO); Michele Cannoni (ITA); Matteo Auguadro (ITA); Andrea Pavan (ITA)	
2016 Sotogrande	Ceeref - SLO Igor Lah (SLO); Adrian Stead (GBR); Dirk De Ridder (NED); Matteo Auguadro (ITA); Jaro Furlani (SLO); Jon Gundersen (NZL); Michele Cannoni (ITA); Simone Mina (ITA)	Peninsula Petroleum - GBR John Bassadone (GBR); Vasco Vascotto (ITA); Oliver Gongora (ESP); German Panei (ARG); Mikel Pasabant Quintian (ESP); Miguel Jauregui (25x17px); Robin Imaz (ESP); Pablo Rosano (ESP)	Artemis - SWE Torbjorn Tornqvist (SWE); Iain Percy (GBR); Noel Drennan (AUS); Christian Kamp (DEN); Anders Ekstrom (SWE); Darren Hutchinson (AUS); Stuart Bettany (NZL); Pieter Van Nieuwenhuijzen (NED)	
2017 Marstrand	Nika Sailing Team RUS 10 Vladimir Prosikhin (RUS); Terry Hutchinson (USA); Tomaž Čopi (SLO); Zachary Hurst (NZL); Mitja Margon (SLO); Ryan Godfrey (AUS); Iztok Knafelc (SLO); Greg Gendell (USA)	Ceeref - SLO Igor Lah; Adrian Stead (GBR); Dirk de Ridder; Jon Gunderson; Mickey Cannoni; Jaro Furlani; Simone Mina; Matteo Auguardo	Bronenosec RUS Vladimir Liubomirov; Kirill Frolov; Cameron Dunn; Alexandr Ekimov; Victor Serezhkin; Pavel Karachov; Pietro Mantovani; Egor Terpigorev; Alex Kulakov	
2018	TEAM NIKA - RUS 10 Vladimir Prosikhin (RUS); Dean Barker (NZL); Tomaz Copi (SLO); Zachary Hurst (NZL); Mitja Margon (SLO); Sean Clarkson (NZL); Iztok Knafelc (SLO); Jeremy Lomas (NZL)	TEAM CEEREF - SLO 11 Igor Lah (SLO); Adrian Stead (GBR); Dirk De Ridder (NED); Javier De La Plaza (ESP); Michele Cannoni (ITA); Jaro Furlani (SLO); Simone Mina (ITA); Matteo Auguadro (ITA)	BRONENOSEC SAILING - 18 Vladimir Liubomirov (RUS); Kirill Frolov (RUS); Cameron Dunn (NZL); Alexander Ekimov (RUS); Victor Serezhkin (RUS); Pavel Karachov (RUS); Pietro Mantovani (ITA); Egor Terpigorev (RUS); Alexey Kulakov (RUS)	
2019	Team Aqua - 25 Chris Bake (NZL); Cameron Appleton (NZL); Andrew Estcourt (NZL); Christian Kamp (DEN); Aaron Cooper (GBR); James Dodd (GBR); Ben Graham (GBR); Juan Marcos (ARG)	Team Nika - 10 Vladimir Prosikhin (RUS); Tom Slingsby (AUS); Tomaz Copi (SLO); Zachary Hurst (NZL); Mitja Margon (SLO); Nikolay Kornev (RUS); Iztok Knafelc (SLO); Jeremy Lomas (NZL)	Artemis Racing - 26 Torbjorn Tornqvist (SWE); Andy Horton (USA); Iain Percy (GBR); Jon Gundersen (NZL); Anders Ekstrom (SWE); Stuart Bettany (NZL); Richard Percy (GBR); Piet Van Nieuwenhuijzen (NED)	
2020	cancelled due to COVID			
2021	Team Aqua - GBR 2041 Chris Bake (25x17px); Cameron Appleton (NZL); Andrew Estcourt (NZL); Christian Kamp (DEN); Juan Marcos (ARG); Ben Graham (GBR); Aaron Cooper (GBR); James Dodd (GBR)	Charisma - MON 69 Nico Poons (NED); Hamish Pepper (NZL); Chris Hosking (AUS); Ross Halcrow (NZL); Dimitri Simons (NED); Mac Agnese (USA); Andrew Roy (NZL); Ivan Peute (NED)	Artemis Racing - SWE 44	
2022	Charisma Nico Poons (NED); Hamish Pepper (NZL); Chris Hosking (AUS); Ross Halcrow (NZL); Dimitri Simons (NED); Ryan Godfrey (AUS); Robin Jacobs (NED); Ivan Peute (NED)	Ceeref powered by Hrastnik 1860 Igor Lah (SLO); Adrian Stead (GBR); Dirk De Ridder (NED); Javier De La Plaza (ESP); Tine Lah (SLO); Andreas Axelsson (SWE); Jelle Janzen (NED); Matteo Auguadro (ITA)	Team Aqua Chris Bake (GBR); Cameron Appleton (NZL); Andrew Estcourt (NZL); Christian Kamp (DEN); Aaron Cooper (GBR); Jonas Hviid-Nielsen (DEN); Ben Graham (GBR); Juan Marcos (ARG)	
2023	CHARISMA 15 Nico Poons (NED); Hamish Pepper (NZL); Chris Hosking (AUS); Ross Halcrow (NZL); Dimitri Simons (NED); Ryan Godfrey (AUS); Robin Jacobs (NED); Flavia Tomiselli (ITA); Ivan Peute (NED)	TEAM AQUA 25 Chris Bake (GBR); Cameron Appleton (NZL); Andrew Estcourt (NZL); Christian Kamp (DEN); Aaron Cooper (GBR); Jonas Hviid-Nielsen (DEN); Ben Graham (GBR); Tinka Visser (NED); Juan Marcos (ARG)	TEAM NIKA 10 Vladimir Prosikhin (RUS); Nic Asher (GBR); James "Skip" Baxter (NZL); Pierluigi De Felice (ITA); Mitja Margon (SLO); Pietro Mantovani (ITA); Iztok Knafelc (SLO); Federica Salva (ITA); Jeremy Lomas (NZL)	
2024	Team Nika MON 10 Vladimir Prosikhin (BUL); Nic Asher (GBR); James Baxter (NZL); Pierluigi De Felice (ITA); Harry Hall (AUS); Pietro Mantovani (ITA); Taavi Taveter (EST); Federica Salva (ITA); Jeremy Lomas (NZL)	Team Ceeref Vaider - SLO 11 Igor Lah (SLO); Adrian Stead (GBR); Dirk De Ridder (NED); Javier De La Plaza (ESP); Tine Lah (SLO); Andreas Axelsson (SWE); Grattan Roberts (IRL); Tina Mrak (SLO); Matteo Auguadro (ITA)	Black Star Sailing Team (SUI 027) Christian Zuerrer (SUI); Cameron Dunn (NZL); Will Ryan (AUS); William Alloway (GBR); Grégoire Siegwart (SUI); Simon Johnson (IRL); Guy Endean (NZL); Kilian Wagen (SUI); Celia Willison (NZL)	
2025	Team Nika - MON 10 Vladimir Prosikhin (RUS); Nic Asher (GBR); James "Skip" Baxter (NZL); Pierluigi De Felice (ITA); Harry Hall (AUS); Pietro Mantovani (ITA); Taavi Taveter (EST); Federica Salva (ITA); Jeremy Lomas (NZL)	TEAM CEEREF VAIDER Igor Lah (SLO); Adrian Stead (GBR); Dirk De Ridder (NED); Javier De La Plaza (ESP); Tine Lah (SLO); Andreas Axelsson (SWE); Grattan Roberts (IRL); Tina Mrak (SLO); Pedro Mas (ESP)	ALEPH RACING Hugues Lepic (FRA); Michele Ivaldi (ITA); Paul Wilcox (RSA); James Dagg (NZL); Oisin Mcclelland (IRL); Jaro Furlani (ITA); Cian Guilfoyle (IRL); Lara Poljsak (SLO); Greg Gendell (USA)	
2026	Aleph Racing - FRA17 Hugues Lepic (FRA); Pietro Loro Piana (ITA); Michele Ivaldi (ITA); Paul Wilcox (RSA); James Dagg (NZL); Joe Drake (GBR); Jaro Furlani (ITA); Cian Guilfoyle (IRL); Lara Poljsak (SLO); Greg Gendell (USA)	Team Aqua - GBR 2041 Chris Bake (GBR); Cameron Appleton (NZL); Andrew Estcourt (NZL); Javier De La Plaza (ESP); Sara Stone (USA); Grace Bake (USA); James Dodd (GBR); Krishan Bhogal (GBR); Andrew Bake (USA); Matt Cassidy (USA)	GeMera Racing - SWE 30 Markus Törnqvist (SWE); Francesco Bruni (ITA); Kyle Langford (AUS); David Gilmour (AUS); Hugo Christenson (SWE); Kinley Fowler (AUS); Luke Muller (USA); Ida Svensson (SWE); Nick Hutton (GBR)	
