= Great Britain at the 1996 Summer Olympics =

- Flag of the United Kingdom
- IOC code: GBR
- NOC: British Olympic Association

in Atlanta
- Competitors: 300 (184 men and 116 women) in 22 sports
- Flag bearers: Steve Redgrave (opening); Roger Black (closing)
- Medals Ranked 36th: Gold 1 Silver 8 Bronze 6 Total 15

Summer Olympics appearances (overview)
- 1896; 1900; 1904; 1908; 1912; 1920; 1924; 1928; 1932; 1936; 1948; 1952; 1956; 1960; 1964; 1968; 1972; 1976; 1980; 1984; 1988; 1992; 1996; 2000; 2004; 2008; 2012; 2016; 2020; 2024

Other related appearances
- 1906 Intercalated Games

Great Britain, represented by the British Olympic Association (BOA), competed at the 1996 Summer Olympics in Atlanta, United States. British athletes have competed in every single Summer Olympic Games. 300 competitors, 184 men and 116 women, took part in 175 events in 22 sports. The Atlanta games saw Great Britain's worst performance at a Summer Olympics since 1952, finishing in 36th position with a single gold medal, and 15 medals overall.

The "rock bottom" British performance at the Atlanta Olympics led to a period of soul searching about the state of British sport. Insufficient funding was identified as a major factor in the poor performance, and this led to a wholesale reform of how elite sports were funded, organised and supported in the UK: At the instigation of the then Prime Minister John Major, UK Sport was created the following year, a public body which distributes National Lottery funding for elite sports. Previously, due to a lack of funding, cyclist Chris Boardman had acclimatised to the humidity of Atlanta by practicing in his home bathroom with the shower turned on, and divers Bob Morgan and Tony Ally sold their Olympic kits while in Atlanta in order to raise funds. Leon Taylor, who would win a silver medal at the 2004 Summer Olympics, suggested the public humiliation for the British Olympic Association from the newspaper stories about Morgan & Ally's actions obligated them to bring in better athlete funding. Nevertheless, the single gold medal won by rowers Matthew Pinsent and Steve Redgrave ensured that Great Britain maintained its record of winning at least one gold medal at every Summer Olympics.

== Medallists ==
Medals by sport
Sport	Gold medal	Silver medal	Bronze medal	Total
Rowing	1	0	1	2
Athletics	0	4	2	6
Sailing	0	2	0	2
Swimming	0	1	1	2
Tennis	0	1	0	1
Cycling	0	0	2	2
Total	1	8	6	15

=== Gold ===
- Matthew Pinsent and Steve Redgrave – Rowing, Men's Coxless Pair

=== Silver ===
- Ben Ainslie – Sailing, Men's Open Laser Class
- Steve Backley – Athletics, Men's javelin throw
- Roger Black – Athletics, Men's 400 m
- Jonathan Edwards – Athletics, Men's triple jump
- Paul Palmer – Swimming, Men's 400 m Freestyle
- Jamie Baulch, Roger Black, Mark Richardson, Iwan Thomas, Mark Hylton (heats) and Du'aine Ladejo (heats) – Athletics, Men's 4 × 400 m Relay
- John Merricks and Ian Walker – Sailing, Men's 470 Class
- Neil Broad and Tim Henman – Tennis, Men's Doubles

=== Bronze ===
- Chris Boardman – Cycling, Men's Road Time Trial
- Denise Lewis – Athletics, Women's Heptathlon
- Max Sciandri – Cycling, Men's Road Race
- Graeme Smith – Swimming, Men's 1500 m Freestyle
- Steve Smith – Athletics, Men's High Jump
- Tim Foster, Rupert Obholzer, Greg Searle, and Jonny Searle – Rowing, Men's Coxless Four

== Medals by day ==
Medals by date
Day	Date	1st place, gold medalist(s)	2nd place, silver medalist(s)	3rd place, bronze medalist(s)	Total
1	20 July	0	0	0	0
2	21 July	0	0	0	0
3	22 July	0	1	0	1
4	23 July	0	0	0	0
5	24 July	0	0	0	0
6	25 July	0	0	1	1
7	26 July	0	0	0	0
8	27 July	1	1	1	3
9	28 July	0	0	2	2
10	29 July	0	1	0	1
11	30 July	0	1	0	1
12	31 July	0	1	1	2
13	1 Aug	0	1	0	1
14	2 Aug	0	0	0	0
15	3 Aug	0	2	1	3
16	4 Aug	0	0	0	0
Total		1	8	6	15

== Archery ==
Athlete	Event	Qualifying		R64	R32	R16	Quarter Final	Semi Final	Final	Rank
Athlete	Event	Score	Rank	Opponent Result	Opponent Result	Opponent Result	Opponent Result	Opponent Result	Opponent Result	Rank
Steven Hallard	Men's Individual	664	17 Q	Tuovila (FIN); Lost 150-151	Did not advance					
Gary Hardinges	Men's Individual	658	24 Q	Cho S-L (TPE); Won 158-158 (10-9)	Huish (USA); Lost 155-166	Did not advance				
Alison Williamson	Women's Individual	648	15 Q	Bridger (AUS); Won 156-141	Zabugina (BLR); Won 152-147	He Ying (CHN); Lost 159-165	Did not advance			

== Athletics ==
Men's 100 metres

- Linford Christie
  - Heat - 10.26
  - Quarter-final - 10.03
  - Semi-final - 10.04
  - Final - DSQ
- Ian Mackie
  - Heat - 10.27
  - Quarter-final - 10.25
  - Semi-final - DNS
- Darren Braithwaite
  - Heat - 10.29
  - Quarter-final - 10.27 (→ did not advance)

Men's 200 metres

- Linford Christie
  - Heat - 20.64
  - Quarter-final - 20.59 (→ did not advance)
- John Regis
  - Heat - 20.78
  - Quarter-final - 20.56
  - Semi-final - 20.58 (→ did not advance)
- Owusu Dako
  - Heat - 20.83 (→ did not advance)

Men's 400 metres

- Roger Black
  - Heat - 45.28
  - Quarter-final - 44.72
  - Semi-final - 44.69
  - Final - 44.41 (→ Silver Medal)
- Iwan Thomas
  - Heat - 45.22
  - Quarter-final - 45.04
  - Semi-final - 45.01
  - Final - 44.70 (→ 5th Place)
- Du'aine Ladejo
  - Heat - 46.27
  - Quarter-final - 45.62 (→ did not advance)

Men's 800 metres

- Curtis Robb
  - Heat - 1:45.85
  - Semi-Final - 1:47.48 (→ did not advance)
- Craig Winrow
  - Heat - 1:47.41
  - Semi-Final - 1:48.57 (→ did not advance)
- David Maxwell Strang
  - Heat 1:47.96 (→ did not advance)

Men's 1500 metres

- John Mayock
  - Heat - 3:42.31
  - Semi-final - 3:34.55
  - Final - 3:40.18 (→ 11th Place)
- Kevin McKay
  - Heat - 3:38.02
  - Semi-final - 3:43.61 (→ did not advance)
- Anthony Whiteman
  - Heat - 3:40.74
  - Semi-final - 3:36.11 (→ did not advance)

Men's 5,000 metres

- John Nuttall
  - Qualification – 13:52.16
  - Semi-final – 14:08.39 (→ did not advance)

Men's 10,000 metres

- Paul Evans
  - Qualification – 28:24.39
  - Final - DNF
- Jon Brown
  - Qualification – 28:19.85
  - Final - 27:59.72 (→ 10th place)

Men's Marathon

- Richard Nerurkar – 2:13.39 (→ 5th place)
- Peter Whitehead – 2:22.37 (→ 55th place)
- Steve Brace – 2:23.28 (→ 60th place)

Men's 110m Hurdles

- Colin Jackson
  - Heat - 13.36
  - Quarter-final - 13.33
  - Semi-final - 13.17
  - Final - 13.19 (→ 4th Place)
- Tony Jarrett
  - Heat - 13.47
  - Quarter-final - DSQ
- Andy Tulloch
  - Heat - 13.56
  - Quarter-final - 13.68 (→ did not advance)

Men's 400m Hurdles

- Jon Ridgeon
  - Heat – 49.31
  - Semi-final – 49.43 (→ did not advance)
- Gary Jennings
  - Heat – 50.41 (→ did not advance)
- Peter Crampton
  - Heat – 49.78 (→ did not advance)

Men's 3,000 metres Steeplechase

- Keith Cullen
  - Heat – 8:31.26
  - Semi-finals – 8:46.74 (→ did not advance)
- Justin Chaston
  - Heat – 8:28.32
  - Semi-finals – 8:28.50 (→ did not advance)
- Spencer Duval
  - Heat – 8:46.76 (→ did not advance)

Men's 50 km Walk

- Chris Maddocks – 4:18:41 (→ 34th place)

Men's 4 × 100m Relay

- Tony Jarrett, Darren Braithwaite, Darren Campbell, Owusu Dako
  - Heat - DNF

Men's 4 × 400m Relay

- Iwan Thomas, Jamie Baulch, Du'aine Ladejo, Mark Richardson and Roger Black
  - Heat – 3:01.79
  - Semi-final – 3:01.36
  - Final – 2:56.60 (→ Silver Medal)

Men's High Jump

- Steve Smith
  - Qualification - 2.28
  - Final - 2.35 (→ Bronze Medal)
- Dalton Grant
  - Qualification - 2.26 (→ did not advance)

Men's Pole Vault

- Nick Buckfield
  - Qualification - 5.40 (→ did not advance)
- Neil Winter
  - Qualification - 5.40 (→ did not advance)

Men's Triple Jump

- Jonathan Edwards
  - Qualification - 16.96
  - Final – 17.88 (→ Silver Medal)
- Francis Agyepong
  - Qualification - 16.71 (→ did not advance)

Men's Shot Put

- Shaun Pickering
  - Qualification - 18.29 (→ did not advance)

Men's Discus Throw

- Bob Weir
  - Qualification – 61.64 m (→ did not advance)
- Glen Smith
  - Qualification – 54.88 m (→ did not advance)

Men's Hammer Throw

- David Smith
  - Qualification – 69.32 m (→ did not advance)

Men's Javelin Throw

- Steve Backley
  - Qualification - 84.14
  - Final – 87.44 (→ Silver Medal)
- Mick Hill
  - Qualification - 80.48
  - Final – 78.58 (→ 12th Place)
- Nick Nieland
  - Qualification - 75.74 (→ did not advance)

Men's Decathlon

- Alex Kruger
  - DNF

Women's 100 metres

- Stephi Douglas
  - Heat - 11.61
  - Quarter-final - 11.75 (→ did not advance)
- Marcia Richardson
  - Heat - 11.42
  - Quarter-final - 11.55 (→ did not advance)
- Simmone Jacobs
  - Heat - 11.39
  - Quarter-final - 11.47 (→ did not advance)

Women's 200 metres

- Katharine Merry
  - Heat - 23.14
  - Quarter-final - 23.17 (→ did not advance)
- Simmone Jacobs
  - Heat - 23.36
  - Quarter-final - 22.96 (→ did not advance)

Women's 400 metres

- Donna Fraser
  - Heat - 52.78
  - Quarter-final - 51.58 (→ did not advance)
- Phylis Smith
  - Heat - 51.29
  - Quarter-final - 52.16 (→ did not advance)

Women's 800 metres

- Kelly Holmes
  - Heat - 1:58.80
  - Semi-final - 1:58.49
  - Final - 1:58.81 (→ 4th Place)
- Diane Modahl
  - Heat - DNF

Women's 1500 metres

- Kelly Holmes
  - Heat - 4:07.36
  - Semi-final - 4:05.88
  - Final - 4:07.46 (→ 11th Place)

Women's 5,000 metres

- Paula Radcliffe
  - Heat - 15:23.90
  - Final - 15:13.11 (→ 5th Place)
- Sonia McGeorge
  - Heat – 16:01.92 (→ did not advance)
- Alison Wyeth
  - Heat – 16:24.74 (→ did not advance)

Women's Marathon

- Liz McColgan – 2:34.30 (→ 16th place)
- Karen MacLeod – 2:42.08 (→ 45th place)
- Suzanne Rigg – 2:52.09 (→ 58th place)

Women's 110 m Hurdles

- Angela Thorp
  - Heat - 12.93
  - Quarter-final - 12.99
  - Semi-final - 12.80 (→ did not advance)
- Jacqui Agyepong
  - Heat - 13.24 (→ did not advance)

Women's 400 m Hurdles

- Sally Gunnell
  - Qualification – 55.29
  - Semi-finals – DNF (→ did not advance)

Women's 10km Walk

- Vicky Lupton – 47:05 (→ 33rd place)

Women's 4×100 metres Relay

- Angie Thorp, Marcia Richardson, Simmone Jacobs, Katharine Merry
  - Final - 43.93 (→ 8th place)

Women's 4×400 metres Relay

- Phylis Smith, Allison Curbishley, Donna Fraser and Georgina Oladapo
  - Qualification – 3:28.13 (→ did not advance)

Women's Long Jump

- Denise Lewis
  - Qualification – 6.33 m (→ did not advance)

Women's Triple Jump

- Ashia Hansen
  - Qualification – 14.55 m
  - Final – 14.49 m (→ 5th place)
- Michelle Griffith
  - Qualification – 13.70 m (→ did not advance)

Women's High Jump

- Lea Haggett
  - Qualification – 1.90 m (→ did not advance)
- Debbie Marti
  - Qualification – 1.85 m (→ did not advance)

Women's Shot Put

- Judy Oakes
  - Qualification – 18.56 m
  - Final – 18.34 m (→ 11th place)

Women's Discus Throw

- Jacqui McKernan
  - Qualification – 58.88 m (→ did not advance)

Women's Javelin Throw

- Tessa Sanderson
  - Qualification – 58.86 m (→ did not advance)
- Shelley Holroyd
  - Qualification – 54.72 m (→ did not advance)

Women's Heptathlon

- Denise Lewis
  - Final result – 6489 points (→ Bronze Medal)

== Beach volleyball ==
Athlete	Event	Round 1	Round 2	Round 3	Round 4	Round 5	Semi Final	Final / BM	Rank
Athlete	Event	Opponent Result	Opponent Result	Opponent Result	Opponent Result	Opponent Result	Opponent Result	Opponent Result	Rank
Audrey Cooper; Amanda Glover	Women's tournament	Bye	Cook & Pottharst (AUS); Lost 4-15	Schoon-Kadijk & van de Ven (NED); Won 15-12	Fenwick & Spring (AUS); Lost 12-15	Did not advance			

== Boxing ==
Athlete	Event	Round of 32	Round of 16	Quarterfinals	Semi-finals	Final	
Athlete	Event	Opposition Result	Opposition Result	Opposition Result	Opposition Result	Opposition Result	Rank
David Burke	Featherweight	Huste (GER); L 9–13	Did not advance				
Fola Okesola	Heavyweight	Bye	Jones (USA); L RSCI	Did not advance			

== Cycling ==
=== Road competition ===
Men's Individual Time Trial

- Chris Boardman

- Final – 1:04:36 (→ Bronze Medal)

Women's Individual Road Race

- Marie Purvis

- Final – 02:37:06 (→ 11th place)

- Sarah Phillips

- Final – 02:37:06 (→ 19th place)

- Caroline Alexander

- Final – 02:53:47 (→ 43rd place)

Women's Individual Time Trial

- Yvonne McGregor

- Final – 39:09 (→ 14th place)

- Sarah Phillips

- Final – 41:16 (→ 21st place)

=== Track competition ===
Men's Team Pursuit

- Chris Newton (→ 10th place)
- Bryan Steel (→ 10th place)
- Matt Illingworth (→ 10th place)
- Rob Hayles (→ 10th place)

=== Mountain Bike ===
Men's Cross Country

- Gary Foord

- Final – 2:29:10 (→ 12th place)

- David Baker

- Final – 2:32:30 (→ 15th place)

Women's Cross Country

- Deb Murrell

- Final – 2:04.44 (→ 22nd place)

== Diving ==
Men's 3m Springboard

- Tony Ally

- Preliminary heat – 345.33
- Semi-final – 203.46 (→ did not advance, 18th place)

- Bobby Morgan

- Preliminary heat – 318.69 (→ did not advance, 24th place)

Women's 10m Platform

- Hayley Allen

- Preliminary heat – 251.73
- Semi-final – 158.43
- Final – 259.68 (→ 9th place)

== Fencing ==
Two fencers, one man and one woman, represented Great Britain in 1996.

Men's sabre

- James Williams

Women's foil

- Fiona McIntosh

== Hockey ==
=== Men's team competition ===
- Preliminary round (group B)

- Great Britain – South Korea 2–2
- Great Britain – Netherlands 2–2
- Great Britain – Malaysia 2–2
- Great Britain – South Africa 2–0
- Great Britain – Australia 0–2

- Classification Matches

- 5th–8th place: Great Britain – Pakistan 1–2
- 7th–8th place: Great Britain – India 4–3 (→ Seventh place)

- Team roster

- Simon Mason (gk)
- Julian Halls
- Jon Wyatt
- Soma Singh
- Jason Laslett (c)
- Kalbir Takher
- Jason Lee
- Phil McGuire
- John Shaw
- Russell Garcia
- Nick Thompson
- David Luckes (gk)
- Simon Hazlitt
- Chris Mayer
- Calum Giles
- Daniel Hall

=== Women's team competition ===
- Round robin

- Great Britain – South Korea 0–5
- Great Britain – Netherlands 1–1
- Great Britain – United States 1–0
- Great Britain – Spain 2–2
- Great Britain – Australia 0–1
- Great Britain – Germany 3–2
- Great Britain – Argentina 5–0

- Bronze Medal Game

- Great Britain – Netherlands 0–0 (The Netherlands wins after penalty strokes, 3–4) → Fourth place

- Team roster

- Jill Atkins
- Anna Bennett
- Karen Brown
- Chris Cook
- Tina Cullen
- Mandy Davies
- Susan Fraser
- Kathryn Johnson
- Tammy Miller
- Joanne Mould
- Mandy Nicholls
- Pauline Robertson
- Hilary Rose (gk)
- Rhona Simpson
- Jane Sixsmith
- Joanne Thompson (gk)

- Head coach: Sue Slocombe

== Modern pentathlon ==
Men's Individual Competition:

- Richard Phelps – 5254pts (→ 18th place)

== Rowing ==
Men

Athlete	Event	Heats		Repechage		Semi-finals		Final	
Athlete	Event	Time	Rank	Time	Rank	Time	Rank	Time	Rank
Peter Haining	Single sculls	7:42.65	4 R	7:45.95	2 SA/B	7:30.47	6 FB	6:55.06	11
Matthew Pinsent; Steve Redgrave	Pair	6:50.04	1 Q	—N/a		6:50.30	1 FA	6:20.09	1st place, gold medalist(s)
James Cracknell; Bob Thatcher; Guy Pooley*	Double sculls	7:00.74	5 R	7:00.81	1 SC/D	6:51.22	2 FC	6:51.41	17
Nicholas Strange; Andrew Sinton	Lightweight double sculls	6:56.86	5 R	6:22.27	2 SA/B	6:39.20	5 FB	6:31.15	12
Tim Foster; Rupert Obholzer; Greg Searle; Jonny Searle	Four	6:14.74	1 Q	—N/a		6:10.78	1 FA	6:07.28	3rd place, bronze medalist(s)
Ben Helm; Tom Kay; David Lemon; James McNiven	Lightweight four	6:35.95	5 R	6:02.65	2 SA/B	6:19.07	5 FB	6:05.13	10
Peter Bridge; Roger Brown; Richard Hamilton; Ben Hunt-Davis; Matthew Parish; Graham Smith; Alex Story; James Walker; Garry Herbert (cox)	Eight	5:49.37	4 R	5:33.22	3 FB	—N/a		5:40.23	8

Women

Athlete	Event	Heats		Repechage		Semi-finals		Final	
Athlete	Event	Time	Rank	Time	Rank	Time	Rank	Time	Rank
Guin Batten	Single sculls	8:16.75	4 R	8:44.73	2 SA/B	7:56.61	3 FA	7:45.08	7
Philippa Cross; Kate MacKenzie	Pair	8:03.53	4 R	8:15.26	3 SA/B	7:59.57	6 FB	7:34.68	12
Miriam Batten; Cath Bishop; Dot Blackie; Lisa Eyre; Alison Gill; Kate Pollitt; Annamarie Stapleton; Joanne Turvey; Suzie Ellis (cox)	Eight	6:39.34	4 R	6:12.28	6 FB	—N/a		6:15.21	7

== Swimming ==
Men's 50 m Freestyle

- Mark Foster

- Heat – 22.73
- B-Final – 23.01 (→ 16th place)

Men's 100 m Freestyle

- Nicholas Shackell

- Heat – 51.03 (→ did not advance, 28th place)

Men's 200 m Freestyle

- Paul Palmer

- Heat – 1:49.05
- Swim-off – 1:48.89
- Final – 1:49.39 (→ 8th place)

- Andrew Clayton

- Heat – 1:51.06
- B-Final – 1:50.59 (→ 15th place)

Men's 400 m Freestyle

- Paul Palmer

- Heat – 3:51.98
- Final – 3:49.00 (→ Silver Medal)

Men's 1500 m Freestyle

- Graeme Smith

- Heat – 15.14.81
- Final – 15:02.48 (→ Bronze Medal)

- Paul Palmer

- Heat – 15:22.65 (→ did not advance, 10th place)

Men's 100 m Backstroke

- Neil Willey

- Heat – 56.27
- B-Final – 56.07 (→ 10th place)

- Martin Harris

- Heat – 57.17 (→ did not advance, 28th place)

Men's 200 m Backstroke

- Adam Ruckwood

- Heat – 2:01.35
- B-Final – 2:02.40 (→ 13th place)

- Martin Harris

- Heat – 2:07.75 (→ did not advance, 32nd place)

Men's 100 m Breaststroke

- Richard Maden

- Heat – 1:02.78
- B-Final – 1:02.51 (→ 11th place)

Men's 200 m Breaststroke

- Nick Gillingham

- Heat – 2:14.96
- Final – 2:14.37 (→ 4th place)

Men's 100 m Butterfly

- James Hickman

- Heat – 53.73
- B-Final – 53.23 (→ 9th place)

Men's 200 m Butterfly

- James Hickman

- Heat – 1:58.16
- Final – 1:58.47 (→ 7th place)

Men's 4 × 100 m Freestyle Relay

- Nicholas Shackell, Alan Rapley, Mark Stevens, and Mike Fibbens

- Heat – 3:21.34
- Final – 3:21.52 (→ 8th place)

Men's 4 × 200 m Freestyle Relay

- Paul Palmer, Andrew Clayton, Mark Stevens, and James Salter

- Heat – 7:21.92
- Final – 7:18.74 (→ 5th place)

Men's 4 × 100 m Medley Relay

- Neil Willey, Richard Maden, James Hickman, and Nicholas Shackell

- Heat – DSQ (→ did not advance)

Women's 50 m Freestyle

- Sue Rolph

- Heat – 26.39 (→ did not advance, 23rd place)

Women's 100 m Freestyle

- Karen Pickering

- Heat – 56.40
- B-Final – 56.32 (→ 14th place)

- Sue Rolph

- Heat – 56.62
- B-Final – 56.58 (→ 16th place)

Women's 200 m Freestyle

- Karen Pickering

- Heat – 2:01.46
- B-Final – 2:02.58 (→ 13th place)

Women's 400 m Freestyle

- Sarah Hardcastle

- Heat – 4:14.50
- B-Final – 4:14.13 (→ 9th place)

Women's 800 m Freestyle

- Sarah Hardcastle

- Heat – 8:37.54
- Final – 8:41.75 (→ 8th place)

Women's 100 m Backstroke

- Helen Slatter

- Heat – 1:03.89
- B-Final – 1:03.61 (→ 13th place)

Women's 200 m Backstroke

- Joanne Deakins

- Heat – 2:15.12
- B-Final – 2:14.50 (→ 12th place)

Women's 100 m Breaststroke

- Jaime King

- Heat – 1:10.83 (→ did not advance, 17th place)

Women's 200 m Breaststroke

- Marie Hardiman

- Heat – 2:31.12
- B-Final – 2:31.39 (→ 14th place)

Women's 200 m Individual Medley

- Sue Rolph

- Heat – 2:18.81 (→ did not advance, 21st place)

Women's 400 m Individual Medley

- Sarah Hardcastle

- Heat – 4:54.64 (→ did not advance, 19th place)

Women's 4 × 100 m Freestyle Relay

- Sue Rolph, Alison Sheppard, Carrie Willmott, and Karen Pickering

- Heat – 3:48.26 (→ did not advance, 9th place)

Women's 4 × 200 m Freestyle Relay

- Claire Huddart, Victoria Horner, Janine Belton, and Karen Pickering

- Heat – 8:14.92 (→ did not advance, 10th place)

Women's 4 × 100 m Medley Relay

- Helen Slatter, Jaime King, Caroline Foot, and Karen Pickering

- Heat – 4:13.75 (→ did not advance, 13th place)

== Tennis ==
Men

Athlete	Event	Round of 64	Round of 32	Round of 16	Quarterfinals	Semi-finals	Final / BM	
Athlete	Event	Opposition Score	Opposition Score	Opposition Score	Opposition Score	Opposition Score	Opposition Score	Rank
Tim Henman	Singles	Matsuoka (JPN); W 7–6^{(7–4)}, 6–3	Woodbridge (AUS); L 6–7^{(6–8)}, 6–7^{(5–7)}	Did not advance				
Greg Rusedski	Singles	Frana (ARG); W 4–6, 7–5, 6–3	Gustafsson (SWE); W 6–7^{(4–7)}, 7–6^{(7–3)}, 6–3	Bruguera (ESP); L 6–7^{(7–9)}, 3–6	Did not advance			
Neil Broad; Tim Henman	Doubles	—N/a	Krošlák / Kučera (SVK); W 6–3, 6–3	Connell / Nestor (CAN); W 7–6^{(7–5)}, 4–6, 6–4	Novák / Vacek (CZE); W 7–6^{(7–4)}, 6–4	Goellner / Prinosil (GER); W 4–6, 6–3, 10–8	Woodbridge / Woodforde (AUS); L 4–6, 4–6, 2–6	2nd place, silver medalist(s)

Women

Athlete	Event	Round of 64	Round of 32	Round of 16	Quarterfinals	Semi-finals	Final / BM	
Athlete	Event	Opposition Score	Opposition Score	Opposition Score	Opposition Score	Opposition Score	Opposition Score	Rank
Clare Wood	Singles	Farina (ITA); L 2–6, 2–6	Did not advance					
Valda Lake; Clare Wood	Doubles	—N/a	K Maleeva / M Maleeva (BUL); W 3–6, 7–6^{(10–8)}, 6–3	Coetzer / de Swardt (RSA); W 7–5, 7–5	G Fernández / MJ Fernández (USA); L 2–6, 1–6	Did not advance		

== Weightlifting ==
Men's Light-Heavyweight

- Anthony Arthur

- Final – 147.5 + 180.0 = 327.5 (→ 12th place)
