= 1995 Men's Hockey Champions Trophy =

Field hockey tournament

Tournament details
- Host country: Germany
- City: Berlin
- Dates: 23 September – 1 October
- Teams: 6 (from 3 confederations)

Final positions
- Champions: Germany (6th title)
- Runner-up: Australia
- Third place: Pakistan

Tournament statistics
- Matches played: 18
- Goals scored: 48 (2.67 per match)
- Top scorer: (Australia) Stephen Davies (4 goals)

The 1995 Men's Champions Trophy was the 17th edition of the Hockey Champions Trophy, an annual international men's field hockey tournament organized by the FIH. It took place from 23 September to 1 October 1995, in the Olympia Stadium in Berlin, Germany.

Germany won the tournament for the sixth time by defeating Australia 4–2 in a Penalty shoot-out in the final after a 2–2 draw.

== Results ==
All times are Central European Summer Time (UTC+02:00) on 23 September and Central European Time (UTC+01:00) from 24 September to 1 October

=== Pool ===
| Pos | Team | Pld | W | D | L | GF | GA | GD | Pts | Qualification |
|---|---|---|---|---|---|---|---|---|---|---|
| 1 | Germany (H) | 5 | 3 | 2 | 0 | 6 | 0 | +6 | 8 | Final |
| 2 | Australia | 5 | 2 | 3 | 0 | 11 | 6 | +5 | 7 | Final |
| 3 | Netherlands | 5 | 3 | 0 | 2 | 6 | 6 | 0 | 6 | Third place game |
| 4 | Pakistan | 5 | 2 | 1 | 2 | 6 | 7 | −1 | 5 | Third place game |
| 5 | England | 5 | 0 | 2 | 3 | 3 | 7 | −4 | 2 | Fifth place game |
| 6 | India | 5 | 0 | 2 | 3 | 5 | 11 | −6 | 2 | Fifth place game |

Source: FIH
(H) Hosts

23 September 1995
13:30

| Australia | 3–3 | Pakistan |
|---|---|---|
| Stacy 39', 64'; Davies 61' | Report | Shahbaz 29'; Ahmed 31'; Naveed 67' |

Umpires:
Santiago Deo (ESP)
Peter Elders (NED)

23 September 1995
15:30

| Germany | 0–0 | India |
|---|---|---|
| | Report |

Umpires:
Peter von Reth (NED)
Graham Little (ENG)

23 September 1995
18:00

| Netherlands | 2–1 | England |
|---|---|---|
| Veen 30'; Delissen 62' | Report | Garcia 43' |

Umpires:
Richard Wolter (GER)
Sathasivan Yasudhasan (MAS)

24 September 1995
13:30

| India | 2–6 | Australia |
|---|---|---|
| R. Singh 47'; Pillay 49' | Report | Davies 6', 51', 53'; Hager 14'; Stacy 40'; Duff 58' |

Umpires:
Christian Siebrecht (GER)
Steve Horgan (USA)

24 September 1995
15:45

| Germany | 3–0 | Netherlands |
|---|---|---|
| Fischer 22', 55'; Meinhardt 60' | Report |

Umpires:
Santiago Deo (ESP)
Sathasivan Yasudhasan (MAS)

24 September 1995
17:45

| England | 0–1 | Pakistan |
|---|---|---|
| | Report | Naveed 44' |

Umpires:
Peter von Reth (NED)
Shakeel Qureshi (IND)

26 September 1995
17:00

| Netherlands | 0–1 | Australia |
|---|---|---|
| | Report | Smith 57' |

Umpires:
Graham Little (ENG)
Richard Wolter (GER)

26 September 1995
19:30

| Germany | 2–0 | England |
|---|---|---|
| Domke 16'; Meinhardt 59' | Report |

Umpires:
Peter Elders (NED)
Sathasivan Yasudhasan (MAS)

27 September 1995
17:00

| Netherlands | 2–0 | Pakistan |
|---|---|---|
| Brinkman 51'; Van den Honert 56' | Report |

Umpires:
Steve Horgan (USA)
Shakeel Qureshi (IND)

27 September 1995
19:30

| India | 1–1 | England |
|---|---|---|
| Nandanoori 52' | Report | Wallis 54' |

Umpires:
Christian Siebrecht (GER)
Peter von Reth (NED)

28 September 1995
17:00

| India | 1–2 | Pakistan |
|---|---|---|
| Ferreira 36' | Report | Ahmed 12', 23' |

Umpires:
Peter Elders (NED)
Richard Wolter (GER)

28 September 1995
19:30

| Germany | 0–0 | Australia |
|---|---|---|
| | Report |

Umpires:
Santiago Deo (ESP)
Steve Horgan (USA)

30 September 1995
13:00

| Netherlands | 2–1 | India |
|---|---|---|
| Van den Honert 17', 67' | Report | Pillay 14' |

Umpires:
Santiago Deo (ESP)
Graham Little (ENG)

30 September 1995
15:00

| England | 1–1 | Australia |
|---|---|---|
| Hall 58' | Report | Carruthers 11' |

Umpires:
Christian Siebrecht (GER)
Shakeel Qureshi (IND)

30 September 1995
17:00

| Germany | 1–0 | Pakistan |
|---|---|---|
| Meinhardt 64' | Report |

Umpires:
Peter von Reth (NED)
Sathasivan Yasudhasan (MAS)

=== Classification ===
==== Fifth and sixth place ====
1 October 1995
11:30

| India | 2–2 | England |
|---|---|---|
| Nandanoori 8'; Alexander 41' | Report | Giles 12'; Pearn 47' |
Penalties
| R. Singh (penalty shoot-out missed); Riaz (penalty shoot-out scored); H. Singh (penalty shoot-out scored); Ahmed (penalty shoot-out scored); Qureshi (penalty shoot-out scored); H. Singh (penalty shoot-out scored); Riaz (penalty shoot-out scored) | 6–5 | (penalty shoot-out scored) Giles; (penalty shoot-out missed) Takher; (penalty shoot-out scored) Mayer; (penalty shoot-out scored) Lee; (penalty shoot-out scored) Thompson; (penalty shoot-out scored) Giles; (penalty shoot-out missed) Mayer |

Umpires:
Christian Siebrecht (GER)
Peter Elders (NED)

==== Third and fourth place ====
1 October 1995
14:00

| Netherlands | 1–2 | Pakistan |
|---|---|---|
| Van Wijk 2' | Report | Naveed 32'; Nadeem 50' |

Umpires:
Richard Wolter (GER)
Steve Horgan (USA)

==== Final ====
1 October 1995
16:30

| Germany | 2–2 | Australia |
|---|---|---|
| Bellenbaum 38'; Bechmann 41' | Report | Smith 27'; Hager 67' |
Penalties
| Meinhardt (penalty shoot-out scored); Bellenbaum (penalty shoot-out scored); Mayerhöfer (penalty shoot-out scored); Tewes (penalty shoot-out scored) | 4–2 | (penalty shoot-out missed) Davies; (penalty shoot-out scored) Stacy; (penalty shoot-out scored) Gaudoin; (penalty shoot-out missed) Duff |

Umpires:
Santiago Deo (ESP)
Peter von Reth (NED)

== Statistics ==
=== Final standings ===
1. Germany
2. Australia
3. Pakistan
4. Netherlands
5. India
6. England

=== Goalscorers ===
There were 48 goals scored in 18 matches, for an average of 2.67 goals per match.

4 goals

- (Australia) Stephen Davies

3 goals

- (Australia) Jay Stacy
- (Germany) Sven Meinhardt
- (Netherlands) Taco van den Honert
- (Pakistan) Shahbaz Ahmed
- (Pakistan) Alam Naveed

2 goals

- (Australia) Mark Hager
- (Australia) Matthew Smith
- (Germany) Carsten Fischer
- (India) Mukesh Nandanoori
- (India) Dhanraj Pillay

1 goal

- (Australia) Stuart Carruthers
- (Australia) Darren Duff
- (England) Russell Garcia
- (England) Calum Giles
- (England) Danny Hall
- (England) Mark Pearn
- (England) James Wallis
- (Germany) Christoph Bechmann
- (Germany) Patrick Bellenbaum
- (Germany) Oliver Domke
- (India) Anil Alexander
- (India) Gavin Ferreira
- (India) Rahul Singh
- (Netherlands) Jacques Brinkman
- (Netherlands) Marc Delissen
- (Netherlands) Remco van Wijk
- (Netherlands) Stephan Veen
- (Pakistan) Muhammad Nadeem
- (Pakistan) Muhammad Shahbaz

Source: FIH
