= Lepic =

Lepic may refer to:

== People ==
- Ludovic-Napoléon Lepic (1839–1889), French artist, archaeologist and patron of the arts.
- Ermin Lepić, (known as Lepa) is a Bosnian volleyball player.
- Louis Lepic (1765-1827), French cavalry commander of the French Revolutionary and Napoleonic Wars.
- Hugues Lepic (born 1965), private equity professional and investor.

== Other ==
- Count Lepic and His Daughters, a painting by Edgar Degas.
- View of Paris from Vincent's Room in the Rue Lepic
- Rue Lepic, ancient road in the commune of Montmartre, France.

== See also ==
- Lepic (surname)
