= India Olympic archery team =

The Indian Olympic archery team competes at the Summer Olympic Games in the sport of archery.

India first entered an archery team for the Summer Olympic Games in 1988, at the Seoul Summer games.

India entered three archers at the 1992 Barcelona Olympics

India entered three archers at the 1996 Atlanta Olympics

India entered six person archery team at the 2004 Athens Olympics

India entered four archers at the Beijing Olympics in 2008.

India entered with a six-person archery team in the London 2012 Olympics.

In the Rio 2016 Olympics, India's Atanu Das was the only individual from the Men's team to reach the Final, finishing equal 9th. In the Women's individual competition, Bombayla Devi Laishram and Deepika Kumari finished equal 9th and Laxmirani Majhi finished equal 33rd.

== Paris Olympics 2024 Indian archery team members ==
India sent six archers to the 2024 Paris Olympics, filling its quota for the first time since the 2012 London Olympics.

The team of Dhiraj Bommadevara and Ankita Bhakat finished fourth in the recurve mixed team event, India's best result at the Olympics.

#	Athlete	Event	Ranking Round	Result
1	Tarundeep Rai	Men's recurve individual	4th (681)	lost to Eric Peters 5-6 (Round of 32)
2	Dhiraj Bommadevara	Men's recurve individual	14th (674)	lost to Tom Hall 5-6 (Round of 64)
3	Pravin Jadhav	Men's recurve individual	39th (658)	lost to Kao Wenchao 0-6 (Round of 64)
4	Deepika Kumari	Women's recurve individual	23rd (658)	lost to Nam Su-hyeon 4-6 (Quarter-finals)
5	Bhajan Kaur	Women's recurve individual	22nd (659)	lost to Diananda Choirunisa 5-6 (Round of 16)
6	Ankita Bhakat	Women's recurve individual	11th (666)	lost to Wioleta Myszor 4-6 (Round of 64)
7	Tarundeep Rai, Dhiraj Bommadevara, Pravin Jadhav	Men's recurve team	3rd (2013)	lost to Turkey 2-6 (Quarter-finals)
8	Deepika Kumari, Bhajan Kaur, Ankita Bhakat	Women's recurve team	4th (1983)	lost to Netherlands 0-6 (Quarter-finals)
9	Dhiraj Bommadevara, Ankita Bhakat	Recurve mixed team	5th (1347)	lost to United States 2-6 (Bronze medal match)

== Tokyo Olympics 2020 Indian archery team members ==
#	Athlete	Event	Ranking Round	Result
1	Atanu Das	Men's recurve individual	35th (653)	lost to Takaharu Furukawa 4-6 (Round of 16)
2	Pravin Jadhav	Men's recurve individual	31st (656)	lost to Brady Ellison 0-6 (Round of 16)
3	Tarundeep Rai	Men's recurve individual	37th (652)	lost to Itay Shanny 0-6 (Round of 16)
4	Deepika Kumari	Women's recurve individual	9th (663)	lost to An San 0-6 (Quarter-finals)
5	Atanu Das, Pravin Jadhav, Tarundeep Rai	Men's recurve team		lost to South Korea 0-6 (Quarter-finals)
6	Deepika Kumari, Pravin Jadhav	Recurve mixed team		lost to South Korea 2-6 (Quarter-finals)

== Rio Olympics 2016 Indian archery team members ==
#	Athlete	Event	Ranking Round
1	Atanu Das	Men's recurve individual	9th
2	Bombayla Devi Laishram	Women's recurve individual	9th
3	Deepika Kumari	Women's recurve individual	9th
4	Laxmirani Majhi	Women's recurve individual	33rd
5	Deepika Kumari/Laishram Bombayla Devi/Laxmirani Majhi	Women's recurve team	6th

== London Olympics 2012 Indian archery team members ==
#	Athlete	Date of birth (age)	Club
1	Jayanta Talukdar	2 March 1986 (age 40)	Tata Archery Academy
2	Rahul Banerjee	15 December 1986 (age 39)	Railways
3	Tarundeep Rai	22 February 1984 (age 42)	Indian Army
4	Deepika Kumari	13 June 1994 (age 32)	Tata Archery Academy
5	Bombayala Devi	22 February 1985 (age 41)	Mittal Champions Trust
6	Chekrovolu Swuro	21 November 1982 (age 43)	Mittal Champions Trust
7	Limba Ram (Coach)	30 January 1972 (age 54)	Archery Association of India
8	Purnima Mahato (Coach)	15 August 1976 (age 50)	Tata Archery Academy
9	Ravi Shankar (Coach)	5 February 1971 (age 55)	Indian Army
10	Paresh Nath Mukherjee (Manager)	2 June 1946 (age 80)	Archery Association of India

The Indian men's archery team of Jayanta Talukdar, Rahul Banerjee and Tarundeep Rai was knocked out of the London Olympics on the opening day.

== Beijing Olympics 2008 Indian archery team members ==
#	Athlete	Date of birth (age)	Club
1	Mangal Singh Champia	9 November 1983 (age 42)	Mittal Champions Trust
2	Dola Banerjee	2 June 1980 (age 46)	Railways
3	Bombayala Devi	22 February 1985 (age 41)	Mittal Champions Trust
4	Pranitha Vardhineni	17 November 1990 (age 35)	Railways
5	Limba Ram (Coach)	30 January 1972 (age 54)	Archery Association of India
6	Purnima Mahato (Coach)	15 August 1976 (age 50)	Tata Archery Academy
7	Lee Wang Woo (Coach)	5 February 1964 (age 62)	Mittal Champions Trust
8	Kulbir singh Kang (Manager)	2 June 1956 (age 70)	Archery Association of India

== Athens Olympics 2004 Indian archery team members ==
#	Athlete	Date of birth (age)
1	Satyadev Prasad	19 September 1979 (age 47)
2	Tarundeep Rai	22 February 1984 (age 42)
3	Majhi Sawaiyan	23 December 1981 (age 44)
4	Dola Banerjee	2 June 1980 (age 46)
5	Reena kumari	15 January 1984 (age 42)
6	Sumangala Sharma	30 December 1986 (age 39)

== Atlanta Olympics 1996 Indian archery team members ==
#	Athlete
1	Limba Ram
2	Skalzang Dorje
3	Lalremsanga Chhangte

== Barcelona Olympics 1992 Indian archery team members ==
#	Athlete
1	Limba Ram
2	Dhulchand Damor
3	Lalremsanga Chhangte

== Seoul Olympics 1988 Indian archery team members ==
#	Athlete
1	Limba Ram
2	Shyam Lal
3	Sanjeeva Singh
