= Skalzang Dorje =

Indian archer (born 1970)

Personal information
- Nationality: Indian
- Born: 23 October 1970 (age 54); Spiti valley, India

Sport
- Sport: Archery

Skalzang Dorje (born 23 October 1970) is a former Indian archer. He competed in the men's individual and team events as a member of the India Olympic archery team at the 1996 Summer Olympics.

== Archery career ==
Overall, Dorje won 12 international medals and 32 national medals in his archery career.

In 1988, Dorje, Limba Ram, and Shyam Lal formed the Men's Team from India that won the gold medal in the Asian Archery Championships in Beijing. This was the first ever international gold medal in archery won by India.

In 1994, he won two silver medals at the National Games in Maharashtra, in the 70m and 90m categories.

In 1989, he stood 27th in the Men's Recurve event at the XXXVth Outdoor Target World Championship at Lausanne.

In 1996, he participated in the Summer Olympics at Atlanta. Dorje achieved the 14th place alongside India's Changte Lalremsanga and Limba Ram in the team event. He achieved the 47th place in the men's event, after losing to Italy's Matteo Bisiani.

== Personal life ==
Dorje hails from the Spiti valley (Himachal Pradesh, India), and lives in Kaza, Spiti valley. He serves as the person in-charge of the Youth Services and Sports Department, Spiti division, Lahaul-and-Spiti district. Alongside, Dorje runs Kaza's Deyzor Hotel with Karanbir Singh Bedi.
