= ClubSwan 50 World Championship =

World Championship in the ClubSwan 50 Class

The ClubSwan 50 World Championship is an annual international sailing regatta for ClubSwan 50 One Design built by Nautor Swan, they are organized by the host club on behalf of the International ClubSwan 50 Class Association and recognized by World Sailing, the sports IOC recognized governing body. The event was often held as part of multiple class events such as Swan's own brand regattas and pinnacle yachting events.

== Events ==
Ed.			Host			Boats	Sailors			Ref
Ed.	Date	Year	Host club	Location	Nat.	Boats	No.	Nations	Cont.	Ref
	8–12 Oct	2018		Palma de Mallorca	Italy	18				
		2020	Marina di Scarlino	Scarlino	Italy	15				
	5-9 Jul	2022	Real Club Nautico de Valencia	Valencia	Spain	15	185	16	3	
	Jun	2025	Yacht Club Costa Smeralda	Porto Cervo	Italy	12	145	23	5	

== Medalists ==
Year	Gold	Silver	Bronze	Ref.
2019; 18 Boats	RUS - Skorpios; Dmitry Rybolovlev (RUS); Fernando Echávarri (ESP); UNKNOWN; UNKNOWN; UNKNOWN; UNKNOWN; UNKNOWN; UNKNOWN	GBR - Perhonen; Ross Warburton (GBR)	GER - Niramo; Sonke Meier Sawatski (GER)	
2020 Scarlino; 15 Boats	GER 5016 - HATARI; Marcus Brennecke (GER); UNKNOWN; UNKNOWN; UNKNOWN; UNKNOWN; UNKNOWN; UNKNOWN	GER 5009 - NIRAMO; Sonke Meier Sawatzki (GER)	RUS 5007 - SKORPIDI; Dmitry Rybolovlev (RUS)	
2021	GER 5016 - HATARI Marcus Brennecke (GER); Nikolaus Beulke (GER); Cesare Bozzetti (ITA); Carl Philipp Brennecke (GER); Dirk De Ridder (NED); Jaro Furlani (ITA); Gerd Habermuller (AUT); Ross Halcrow (NZL); Michele Ivaldi (ITA); Felix Kaiser (GER); Michael Muller (GER); Markus Wieser (GER)	GER 5005 - EARLYBIRD (276) Hendrik Brandis (GER)	ITA 5027 - CUORDILEONE Leonardo Ferragamo (ITA)	
2022 Valencia; 16 Boats	ITA - Cuordileone Leonardo Ferragamo (ITA); Danilo Arvigo (ITA); Daniele Cassinari (ITA); Claudio Celon (ITA); Federico Colaninno (ITA); Giampaolo Galloro (ITA); Federico Michetti (ITA); Giuseppe Montella (ITA); Davide Scarpa (USA); Andrea Serpi (ITA); Nicolò Telese (ITA); Manuel Weiller Vidal (ESP)	GER - Earlybird; Hendrik Brandis (GER)	BEL - Balthasar; Louis Balcaen (BEL)	
2025	GER 5005 - EARLYBIRD Hendrik Brandis (GER); Shane Elliott (RSA); Elisa Mangani (ITA); Manuel Weiller Vidal (ESP); Maximilian Stein (GER); Nikolaus Beulke (GER); Arnd Howar (GER); Lorenzo De Felice (ITA); Pierluigi De Felice (ITA); Robin Jacobs (NED); Elliot Willis (GBR); Taavi Valter Taveter (EST)	GBR 5023 - PERHONEN	MON 5028 - MOONLIGHT	
