= Baghirov =

Baghirov (Azerbaijani: Bağırov; Russian: Багиров, romanized: Bagirov) is an Azerbaijani masculine surname derived from the male given name Baghir (Azerbaijani: Bağır; Russian: Багир, romanized: Bagir) + Russian suffix -ов (-ov). Its feminine counterpart is Baghirova (Azerbaijani: Bağırova; Russian: Багирова, romanized: Bagirova.

People with this name include:

- Allahverdi Baghirov (1946–1992), Azerbaijani politician
- Eduard Bagirov (1975–2023), Russian writer, radio presenter and politician
- Faiq Bağırov (born 1976), Azerbaijani middle-distance runner
- Hajibaba Baghirov (1932–2006), Azerbaijani actor
- Huseyngulu Baghirov (born 1955), Azerbaijani politician
- Kamran Baghirov (1933–2000), Azerbaijani communist leader
- Mir Jafar Baghirov (1896–1956), Azerbaijani communist leader
- Museyib Baghirov (1915–1981), Azerbaijani Red Army captain
- Natik Bagirov (born 1964), Azerbaijani judoka
- Parviz Baghirov (born 1994), Azerbaijani Olympic boxer
- Samir Bağırov (born 1967), Azerbaijani pop singer
- Vladimir Bagirov (1936–2000), Soviet chess player, author and trainer
- Toghrul Adil oghlu Baghirov (1954–2019), Azerbaijani and Russian expert in the field of global energy
