= Stefan Mlyakov =

Bulgarian archer (born 1971)

Personal information
- Nationality: Bulgarian
- Born: 22 September 1971 (age 53); Gabrovo, Bulgaria

Sport
- Sport: Archery

Stefan Mlyakov (Bulgarian: Стефан Мляков; born 22 September 1971) is a Bulgarian archer. He competed in the men's individual event at the 1996 Summer Olympics.
