= Ross Halcrow =

New Zealand sailor (born 1966)

Ross "Rosco" Halcrow (born 17 November 1966) is a New Zealand sailor who has won both the America's Cup and the Volvo Ocean Race.

== Sailing career ==
Halcrow stated as a sailmaker and backup crew member for New Zealand Challenge in both the 1987 America's Cup and 1992 America's Cup.

=== Ocean Racing ===
He sailed in the following round the world races:

- 1989–90 Whitbread Round the World Race on Maxi Ketch Fisher & Paykel NZ.
- 1997–98 Whitbread Round the World Race on the Volvo 60 - Innovation Kvaerner
- 2001–02 Volvo Ocean Race, sailed on winner Illbruck Challenge
- 2005–06 Volvo Ocean Race. joined the team from leg 5 sailing on Ericsson Racing Team

=== America Cup ===
He joined Team New Zealand and was part of the sailing crew on NZL 32 when it won the 1995 Louis Vuitton Cup and 1995 America's Cup.

For the 2000 Louis Vuitton Cup where he sailed and was in charge of the sail program for the New York Yacht Club's Young America challenge .

He joined Oracle Racing in 2003 and sailed with them in the 2007 Louis Vuitton Cup.

With Oracle he won the 2010 America's Cup as the jib trimmer on USA 17.

=== World Championships ===
He sailed on Pinta when it won the One Ton Cup in 1993.

With Oracle, Halcrow came second in the 2010 RC44 World Championship.

In 2017 he won both the TP52 Super Series & World Championship onboard Platoon, and the IMA Maxi72 World Championship] onboard MOMO. Other World Championship include the 2014 Soto 40 Worlds and the 2022 6 metre Worlds and the ClubSwan 50 World Championship.

== Personal life ==
He is married to American Lindsay Halcrow (born 19 June 1983).
