= Okyay Küçükkayalar =

Turkish archer (born 1978)

Personal information
- Nationality: Turkish
- Born: 8 July 1978 (age 46)

Sport
- Sport: Archery

Okyay Küçükkayalar (born 8 July 1978) is a Turkish archer. He competed in the men's individual event at the 1996 Summer Olympics.
