= Wu Tsung-yi =

Taiwanese archer (born 1972)

Personal information
- Nationality: Taiwanese
- Born: 25 October 1972 (age 53)

Sport
- Sport: Archery

Wu Tsung-yi (born 25 October 1972) is a Taiwanese archer. He competed in the men's individual and team events at the 1996 Summer Olympics.
