= Lepic (surname) =

Lepic is a surname of French origin. Notable people by that name include:

- Ludovic-Napoléon Lepic (1839–1889), French artist, archaeologist and patron of the arts.
- Ermin Lepić, (known as Lepa) is a Bosnian volleyball player.
- Louis Lepic (1765-1827), French cavalry commander of the French Revolutionary and Napoleonic Wars.
- Hugues Lepic (born 1965), private equity professional and investor.
