= Luo Hengyu =

Chinese archer (born 1972)

Personal information
- Nationality: Chinese
- Born: 22 December 1972 (age 53)

Sport
- Sport: Archery
Medal record
Men's archery
Representing China
Asian Championships
Gold medal – first place	1996 Chonburi	Individual

Luo Hengyu (born 22 December 1972) is a Chinese archer. He competed in the men's individual and team events at the 1996 Summer Olympics.
