= Damien Letulle =

French archer (born 1973)

Personal information
- Born: 3 April 1973 (age 51); Bayeux, France

Sport
- Country: France
- Sport: Archery

Damien Letulle (born 3 April 1973) is a French archer. He competed in the men's individual and team events at the 1996 Summer Olympics. After an accident which left him partially paralyzed, he returned to para-archery to compete at the 2024 Summer Paralympics in Paris.

== See also ==
- List of athletes who have competed in the Paralympics and Olympics
