= Kim Bo-ram =

South Korean archer (born 1973)

Personal information
- Nationality: South Korean
- Born: April 9, 1973 (age 53)

Sport
- Sport: Archery
Medal record
Men's recurve archery
Representing South Korea
Olympic Games
Silver medal – second place	1996 Atlanta	Team
World Championships
Gold medal – first place	1997 Victoria	Team
Silver medal – second place	1999 Riom	Team
Asian Championships
Gold medal – first place	1993 Jakarta	Individual
Gold medal – first place	1993 Jakarta	Team
Gold medal – first place	1993 Jakarta	90m
Gold medal – first place	2003 Yangon	Team
Gold medal – first place	2005 New Delhi	Team
Silver medal – second place	2005 New Delhi	Individual
Bronze medal – third place	1993 Jakarta	50m
Bronze medal – third place	1993 Jakarta	70m
Bronze medal – third place	2007 Xi'an	Team

Kim Bo-ram (born April 9, 1973) is a South Korean archer. He competed in the men's individual and team events at the 1996 Summer Olympics, winning a silver medal in the team competition.
