= Andrey Podlazov =

Russian archer (born 1968)

Personal information
- Nationality: Russian
- Born: 6 June 1968 (age 56)

Sport
- Sport: Archery

Andrey Podlazov (born 6 June 1968) is a Russian archer. He competed in the men's individual and team events at the 1996 Summer Olympics.
