= Oleksandr Yatsenko (archer) =

Ukrainian archer (born 1958)

Personal information
- Nationality: Ukrainian
- Born: 22 November 1958 (age 66)

Sport
- Sport: Archery

Oleksandr Yatsenko (born 22 November 1958) is a Ukrainian archer. He competed in the men's individual and team events at the 1996 Summer Olympics.
