= Paweł Szymczak =

Polish archer (born 1978)

Personal information
- Nationality: Polish
- Born: 8 August 1978 (age 46); Bydgoszcz, Poland

Sport
- Sport: Archery

Paweł Szymczak (born 8 August 1978) is a Polish archer. He competed in the men's individual event at the 1996 Summer Olympics.
