= Mikael Larsson =

Swedish archer (born 1971)

Personal information
- Nationality: Swedish
- Born: 19 May 1971 (age 54) Årsunda, Sweden

Sport
- Sport: Archery

Mikael Larsson (born 19 May 1971) is a Swedish archer. He competed in the men's individual and team events at the 1996 Summer Olympics.
