= Sergey Martynov (archer) =

Kazakhstani archer

Sergei Martynov
Personal information
- Nationality: Kazakh
- Born: July 22, 1965 (age 60)

Sport
- Country: Kazakhstan
- Sport: Archery

Sergei Martynov (Сергей Юрьевич Мартынов, born 22 July 1965) is an archer from Kazakhstan. Martynov represented Kazakhstan at the 1996 Summer Olympics competing in the men's team and men's individual events.
