= Andrew Lindsay (archer) =

New Zealand archer (born 1976)

Personal information
- Nationality: New Zealand
- Born: 9 May 1976 (age 48); Auckland, New Zealand

Sport
- Sport: Archery

Andrew Lindsay (born 9 May 1976) is a New Zealand archer. He competed in the men's individual event at the 1996 Summer Olympics.
