= Hsieh Sheng-feng =

Taiwanese archer

Personal information
- Nationality: Taiwanese
- Born: 19 June 1978 (age 46)

Sport
- Sport: Archery

Hsieh Sheng-feng (born 19 June 1978) is a Taiwanese archer. He competed in the men's individual and team events at the 1996 Summer Olympics.
