= Valeriy Yevetskiy =

Ukrainian archer (born 1962)

Personal information
- Nationality: Ukrainian
- Born: 4 December 1962 (age 62)

Sport
- Sport: Archery

Valeriy Yevetskiy (born 4 December 1962) is a Ukrainian archer. He competed in the men's individual and team events at the 1996 Summer Olympics.
