= Kevin Sally =

Canadian archer (born 1972)

Personal information
- Born: 5 December 1972 (age 53) Richmond Hill, Ontario, Canada

Sport
- Sport: Archery
Medal record
Representing Canada
Pan American Games
Bronze medal – third place	1995 Mar del Plata	Recurve team

Kevin Sally (born 5 December 1972) is a Canadian archer. He competed in the men's individual and team events at the 1996 Summer Olympics.
