= Shen Jun (archer) =

Chinese archer (born 1972)

Personal information
- Nationality: Chinese
- Born: 27 June 1972 (age 52)

Sport
- Sport: Archery

Shen Jun (born 27 June 1972) is a Chinese archer. He competed in the men's individual and team events at the 1996 Summer Olympics.
