= Makradeo =

Makradeo Makara Dev
- Village
- Location in Rajasthan, India Makradeo (India)
- Coordinates: 24°19′51.27″N 73°31′50.83″E
- Country: India
- State: Rajasthan
- District: Udaipur

Government
  - Type: Panchayati raj (India)
  - Body: Gram panchayat

Population (2001)
  - Total: 1,868

Languages
  - Official: Hindi
- Time zone: UTC+5:30 (IST)
- PIN: 313031
- Telephone code: 02959
- ISO 3166 code: RJ-IN
- Vehicle registration: RJ-
- Nearest city: Udaipur
- Lok Sabha constituency: Udaipur

Makradeo is a village in Jhadol tahsil in Udaipur district of Rajasthan state of India. The village is just near Saradit village and hence both villages have same PIN code 313031.
