= Keith Hanlon =

Irish archer (born 1966)

Personal information
- Nationality: Irish
- Born: 1 September 1966 (age 58)

Sport
- Sport: Archery

Keith Hanlon (born 1 September 1966) is an Irish archer. He competed in the men's individual event at the 1996 Summer Olympics.
