= Tommi Tuovila =

Finnish archer (born 1971)

Personal information
- Nationality: Finnish
- Born: 8 July 1971 (age 53); Kuusamo, Finland

Sport
- Sport: Archery

Tommi Tuovila (born 8 July 1971) is a Finnish archer. He competed in the men's individual and team events at the 1996 Summer Olympics.
