= Alloysius Edwards =

Indian field hockey player

Personal information
- Nationality: Indian
- Born: 21 December 1968 (age 57)

Sport
- Sport: Field hockey

Alloysius Edwards (born 21 December 1968) is an Indian field hockey player from Hyderabad. He competed in the men's tournament at the 1996 Summer Olympics.
