= Mittal Champions Trust =

Organization

- Formation: 9 November 2003
- Dissolved: March 2014
- Location: Mumbai, India
- Founder: Mahesh Bhupathi
- Head: Laxmi Mittal
- Administrator: Manisha Malhotra
- Budget: $9million

Mittal Champions Trust (2005 to 2014) was a trust which supported Indian athletes with world-beating potential. It was funded by Lakshmi Mittal and was initiated by his son-in-law Amit Bhatia.

It was founded on 9 November 2005 by Mahesh Bhupathi. The first beneficiary was Joshna Chinappa, India's best squash player. The trust was formed due to Mittal being disappointed by the dismal performance by Indians, who won just one bronze medal in the 1996 Summer Olympics, another bronze in the 2000 Summer Olympics and a silver medal in the 2004 Summer Olympics. The initial funding is $9 million. The trust developed Indian athletes for the 2012 Olympics in London.

The sports focused on were Squash, Badminton, Archery, Boxing, Shooting sports, Swimming and Heptathlon. The foundation did not support cricket.

== Players supported ==
Mittal Champions Trust has 40 athletes as of now. They had supported Abhinav Bindra when he had problem in importing ammunition. The trust supported Abhinav with 50 lacs. MCT also plans to develop training facilities in the country.

Boxing

- Akhil Kumar
- Jitender Kumar
- Dinesh Kumar

Shooting

- Abhinav Bindra
- Anjali Bhagwat
- Ronjan Sodhi
- Suma Shirur
- Heena Sidhu

Swimming

- Virdhawal Khade

Wrestling

- Yogeshwar Dutt
- Naveen Singh Suhag
- Palwinder Singh Cheema
- Mausam Khatri

Archery

- Bombayla Devi
- Mangal Singh Champia

Squash

- Dipika Pallikal
- Joshna Chinappa

Athletics

- Krishna Poonia

Sailing

- Nitin Mongia

== Awards ==
L N Mittal announced a 1.5 crore cash award for Abhinav Bindra for winning the gold medal in Olympics.

== See also ==
- Tata Sporting Samaritan
- Olympic Gold Quest
