= Museyib Baghirov =

Azerbaijani Red Army captain, Hero of the Soviet Union (1915–1981)

Museyib Baghir oglu Baghirov
- Müseyib Bağır oğlu Bağırov
- Born: 30 June 1915; Yelizavetpol, Yelizavetpol Governorate, Russian Empire
- Died: 17 May 1981 (aged 65); Baku, Azerbaijan SSR, Soviet Union
- Military career
- Allegiance: Soviet Union
- Branch: Red Army
- Service years: 1941–1945
- Rank: Captain
- Unit: 69th Guards Rifle Division
- Conflicts: World War II; Battle of Kursk; Battle of the Dnieper
- Awards: Hero of the Soviet Union

Museyib Baghir oglu Baghirov (Azerbaijani: Müseyib Bağır oğlu Bağırov; 30 June 1915–17 May 1981) was an Azerbaijani Red Army captain and a Hero of the Soviet Union. Baghirov was awarded the title on 22 February 1944 for his actions during the Battle of the Dnieper, in which his platoon reportedly killed up to 250 German soldiers and destroyed three tanks. Postwar, Baghirov was demobilized and worked in the oil industry.

== Early life ==
Baghirov was born on 30 June 1915 in Yelizavetpol in the family of a textile worker. He graduated from junior high school in 1931 and moved to Baku, where he graduated from the Naval College. He returned to Ganja (renamed Kirovabad) and worked as an assistant foreman at the Kirovabad Textile Combine.

== World War II ==
Baghirov was drafted into the Red Army in 1941. He fought in combat from November 1942 in battles on the Volga River. Baghirov was sent to the Kemerovo Infantry School and graduated from an accelerated course in 1943. He was sent to the front as a platoon leader in the 206th Guards Rifle Regiment of the 69th Guards Rifle Division. Baghirov fought in the Battle of Kursk.

Baghirov fought in the Battle of the Dnieper. On 9 September, southwest of Zinkiv, he reportedly captured an important height leading 11 other soldiers. During the battle, Baghirov reportedly killed 28 German soldiers with a sniper rifle. He reportedly destroyed an anti-tank gun and killed its crew with grenades. The platoon reportedly held the height for the rest of the day, destroying 3 tanks and killing up to 250 German soldiers. Baghirov was wounded, but reportedly did not leave the battlefield. He was later evacuated to a hospital. In 1944, he joined the Communist Party of the Soviet Union. On 22 February 1944 he was awarded the title Hero of the Soviet Union and the Order of Lenin.

After recovering from his wound, Baghirov returned to the regiment. He fought through the rest of the war and was seriously wounded in both hands and head at the end of the war. Baghirov spent almost eight months in the hospital and was demobilized in October 1945 with the rank of captain.

== Postwar ==
Baghirov moved to Baku and graduated from the Commercial College. For several years, he worked as head of geological exploration in the Neftechalaneft oilfields. Baghirov survived a fall from a 25 meter tower but was unable to engage in physical labor afterwards. He began working in the Karadagneft Workers' Supply Department. Baghirov later worked as director of a department store in Lökbatan and then at the Gastronom store in Baku. He died on 17 May 1981.

== Personal life ==
Baghirov married and had two daughters, Raya Babayeva and Sitara Baghirova.
