= Cho Sheng-ling =

Taiwanese archer (born 1977)

Personal information
- Nationality: Taiwanese
- Born: 12 January 1977 (age 48)

Sport
- Sport: Archery

Cho Sheng-ling (born 12 January 1977) is a Taiwanese archer. He competed in the men's individual and team events at the 1996 Summer Olympics. In the 1996 Summer Olympics, Cho Sheng-ling reached a #41 position in Archery.
