= Hajibaba Baghirov =

Azerbaijani actor (born 1932)

Hacıbaba Bağırov
- Born: Hacıbaba Ağarza oğlu Bağırov; June 12, 1932; Baku, Azerbaijani SSR, USSR
- Died: October 4, 2006 (aged 74); Baku, Azerbaijan
- Occupation: Actor
- Years active: 1947–2006

Hajibaba Baghirov (Azerbaijani: Hacıbaba Bağırov; June 12, 1932 – October 4, 2006) was an Azerbaijani actor. He was famous mostly for his comedy roles.
