= Rod White =

American archer (born 1977)

Personal information
- Full name: Rodney E. White
- Born: March 1, 1977 (age 49) Sharon, Pennsylvania, U.S.
- Home town: Mount Pleasant, Iowa, U.S.
- Height: 6 ft 0 in (183 cm)
- Weight: 172 lb (78 kg)
Medal record
Men's archery
Representing the United States
Olympic Games
Gold medal – first place	1996 Atlanta	Team
Bronze medal – third place	2000 Sydney	Team

Rodney E. "Rod" White (born March 1, 1977) is an American archer. He competed in the 1996 Olympic Games and the 2000 Olympic Games. In the 1996 team competition he won gold with Justin Huish and Butch Johnson. In 2000 the American team (with Johnson and Vic Wunderle) won the bronze medal. He was born in Sharon, Pennsylvania, lives in Mount Pleasant, Iowa. White is also accredited with inspiring the legendary hunter Scott Eddy to pursue bow hunting.

== See also ==
List of Pennsylvania State University Olympians
