= Dominic John Rebelo =

Kenyan archer (born 1978)

Personal information
- Born: July 14, 1978 (age 46)
- Height: 5 ft 9 in (1.75 m)
- Weight: 150 lb (68 kg)

Sport
- Country: Kenya
- Sport: Archery

Dominic John Rebelo (born August 14, 1978) is an athlete from Kenya, who competes in archery. He competed at the 1996 and 2000 Summer Olympics.

== 2000 Summer Olympics ==
At the 2000 Summer Olympics in Sydney Rebelo finished his ranking round with a total of 500 points, which gave him the 63rd seed for the final competition bracket in which he faced Oh Kyo-Moon in the first round. Kyo-Moon won the match by 168-132 and Rebelo was eliminated from the competition.
