= Raul Kivilo =

Estonian archer (born 1970)

Personal information
- Nationality: Estonian
- Born: 4 October 1970 (age 54); Järvakandi, Estonia

Sport
- Sport: Archery

Raul Kivilo (born 4 October 1970) is an Estonian archer. He competed at the 1992 Summer Olympics and the 1996 Summer Olympics.
