= Alenka Orel =

Slovenian sailor

Personal information
- Nationality: Slovenian
- Born: 14 March 1977 (age 48); Izola, Yugoslavia

Sport
- Sport: Sailing

Alenka Orel (born 14 March 1977) is a Slovenian sailor. She competed in the women's 470 event at the 1996 Summer Olympics.
