= Gregor Terdič =

Slovenian slalom canoeist (born 1977)

Medal record

Men's canoe slalom

Representing Slovenia

World Championships
Bronze medal – third place	1997 Três Coroas	C-1 team

Gregor Terdič (born June 7, 1977, in Medvode) is a Slovenian slalom canoeist who competed from the mid-1990s to the early 2000s. He won a bronze medal in the C-1 team event at the 1997 ICF Canoe Slalom World Championships in Três Coroas.

Terdič also finished 24th in the C-1 event at the 1996 Summer Olympics in Atlanta.
