= Saradit =

Saradit Saradeet
- village
- Location in Rajasthan, India Saradit (India)
- Coordinates: 24.3°N 73.5167°E
- Country: India
- State: Rajasthan
- District: Udaipur

Government
  - Body: Gram panchayat
- Elevation: 653 m (2,142 ft)

Population (2001)
  - Total: 1,096

Languages
  - Official: Hindi
- Time zone: UTC+5:30 (IST)
- PIN: 313031
- Telephone code: 02959
- ISO 3166 code: RJ-IN
- Vehicle registration: RJ-
- Nearest city: Udaipur
- Lok Sabha constituency: Udaipur

Saradit, also spelled as Saradeet, is a small village in Jhadol (Jharol) tahsil (Udaipur district, Rajasthan state, India). It is the birthplace of Archer Limba Ram.
