= Patrick Bellenbaum =

German hockey player

Personal information
- Nationality: German
- Born: 28 April 1974 (age 51) Oberhausen, West Germany

Sport
- Sport: Field hockey

Patrick Bellenbaum (born 28 April 1974) is a German former field hockey player. He competed in the men's tournament at the 1996 Summer Olympics.
