= Gary Hardinges =

British archer (born 1965)

Personal information
- Nationality: British
- Born: 6 December 1965 (age 59); Eastcote, England

Sport
- Sport: Archery

Gary Hardinges (born 6 December 1965) is a British archer. He competed in the men's individual event at the 1996 Summer Olympics.
