= Janja Orel =

Slovenian sailor

Personal information
- Nationality: Slovenian
- Born: 14 March 1977 (age 48) Izola, Yugoslavia

Sport
- Country: Slovenia
- Sport: Sailing

Janja Orel (born 14 March 1977) is a Slovenian sailor. She competed at the 1996 Summer Olympics and the 2000 Summer Olympics.
