= Michele Ivaldi =

Italian sailor

Michele Ivaldi (born 11 March 1970) is an Italian yacht racer who competed in the 1996 Summer Olympics.

He sailed with Luna Rossa Challenge in the 2007 America's Cup. He then joined Oracle Racing in 2008, before joining Artemis Racing for the 2010 Louis Vuitton Trophy Dubai.
