= Tomaž Čopi =

Slovenian sailor (born 1970)

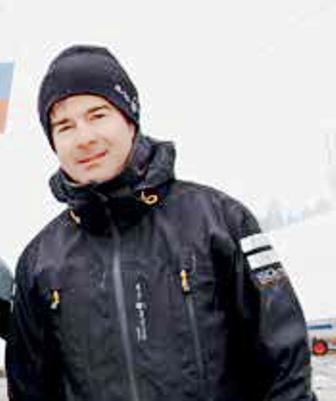
- Tomaž Čopi in 2005

Personal information
- Nationality: Slovenian
- Born: 2 July 1970 (age 54); Koper, Yugoslavia

Sport
- Sport: Sailing

Tomaž Čopi (born 2 July 1970) is a Slovenian sailor. He competed at the 1996 Summer Olympics, the 2000 Summer Olympics, and the 2004 Summer Olympics.
