= Chris Mayer (field hockey) =

British field hockey player (born 1968)

Personal information
- Born: 17 March 1968 (age 58) Cannock, England
- Height: 183 cm (6 ft 0 in)
- Weight: 70 kg (154 lb)

Sport
- Sport: Field hockey
Senior career
Years	Team	Caps	Goals
1984–2004	Cannock	-	-
National team
Years	Team	Caps	Goals
–	England & Great Britain		-
Medal record
Men's field hockey
Representing England
European Championship
Bronze medal – third place	1991 Paris	Team
Bronze medal – third place	1995 Dublin	Team

Christopher Ian Mayer (born 17 March 1968) is a British former field hockey player who competed in the 1996 Summer Olympics.

== Biography ==
Mayer born in Cannock and educated at Cannock Chase High School, played club hockey for Cannock Hockey Club in the Men's England Hockey League. he represented his county Staffordshire in 1985 and was called up for England U18 duty in 1986.

While at Cannock, he represented England at the 1990 Men's Hockey World Cup, participated in the 1994 Men's Hockey World Cup and represented Great Britain at the 1996 Olympic Games in Atlanta.

In 2000, he made his 200th league appearance for Cannock.
