= Mitja Margon =

Slovenian sailor

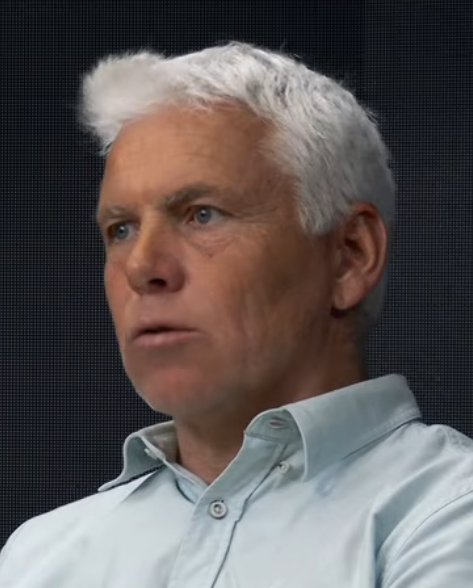
- Mitja Margon in 2026

Personal information
- Nationality: Slovenian
- Born: 28 September 1971 (age 54) Portorož, Yugoslavia

Sport
- Sport: Sailing

Mitja Margon (born 28 September 1971) is a Slovenian sailor. He competed at the 1996 Summer Olympics and the 2000 Summer Olympics.
