= Rahul Singh (field hockey) =

Indian field hockey player

Personal information
- Nationality: Indian
- Born: 5 January 1975 (age 51)

Sport
- Sport: Field hockey

Rahul Singh (born 5 January 1975) is an Indian field hockey player. He competed in the men's tournament at the 1996 Summer Olympics.
