= Jackson Fear =

Australian archer (1978–2006)

Jackson Campbell Fear (13 January 1978 – 21 July 2006) was an Australian archer born in Sydney, New South Wales.

== Archery career ==
Fear finished 35th in the individual competition at the 1996 Summer Olympics, behind teammate Matthew Gray (26th) and ahead of Simon Fairweather (52nd). The Australian team (Gray, Fear and Fairweather) finished 4th after losing to South Korea in the semi-finals.

Fear was in line for selection for the 2000 Summer Olympics, but was forced out after testing positive to cannabis at the Australian Championships in May 2000. He admitted to using the drug and was suspended from competition for two years.

In 2004, he was charged with 14 counts of internet fraud on eBay, and with trafficking, possession and use of cannabis.

He committed suicide on 21 July 2006.

== See also ==
- Archery at the 1996 Summer Olympics
- Australia at the 1996 Summer Olympics
