= Hugues Lepic =

- Born: c. 1965
- Education: École Polytechnique, Wharton School of the University of Pennsylvania
- Occupation: Investor
- Employer: Aleph Capital Partners

Hugues Bernard Charles Lepic (born c. 1965) is a private equity professional and investor who is the founder and chief executive officer of Aleph Capital Partners. He previously spent 22 years with Goldman Sachs.

== Education ==
Lepic holds an M.Sc. from the École Polytechnique in France and an MBA from the Wharton School of the University of Pennsylvania.

== Career ==
Lepic is the founder and chief executive officer of Aleph Capital Partners. He founded Aleph in 2013 after 22 years as a private equity professional with Goldman Sachs in New York. He was a partner there for 12 years.

== Appointments ==
Lepic has been a director of Eutelsat Communications SA, Prysmian Spa, Groupe Eurotunnel SA, Iliad SA, Neuf Cegetel SA, Pages Jaunes Groupe, and Technicolor SA.
