= Peter Koprivnikar =

Slovenian archer (born 1976)

Personal information
- Nationality: Slovenian
- Born: 2 July 1976 (age 48); Maribor, Yugoslavia

Sport
- Sport: Archery

Peter Koprivnikar (born 2 July 1976) is a Slovenian archer. He competed at the 1996 Summer Olympics and the 2000 Summer Olympics.
