= Justin Huish =

American archer (born 1975)

Personal information
- Full name: Justin Grant Huish
- Born: January 9, 1975 (age 51) Fountain Valley, California, U.S.
- Height: 5 ft 10 in (1.77 m)
Medal record
Men's archery
Representing the United States
Olympic Games
Gold medal – first place	1996 Atlanta	Individual
Gold medal – first place	1996 Atlanta	Team

Justin Grant Huish (born January 9, 1975, in Fountain Valley, California) is an American double Olympic champion in Archery, titles he won at the 1996 Atlanta Games. Known for his unorthodox character sporting wrap-around shades, backwards baseball cap, ponytail and an earring, Huish captivated the crowd by winning a gold medal in the individual and team events. In the individual, Huish ranked no higher than 24th in the world at the time but rose to the occasion and saw off Sweden's Magnus Pettersson 112–107 in the final. Huish was the first male archer to win double gold medals and his wins led to a popularity boost for the sport. His feat was matched by South Korea's Ku Bon-chan in the 2016 Summer Olympics and Kim Woo-jin in the 2024 Summer Olympics. He was later credited for encouraging actress Geena Davis to pick up the sport.

As a ninth-grader he was into skateboarding, lived on a street called Broken Arrow, and thought archery was boring. But when Huish's parents opened Arrowsmith Archery, he wanted a job. He didn't pick up the sport until age 14 and would practice standing in the middle of the street, shooting arrows through the front door of his garage, through the back door of his garage, and into a target in his backyard. Only three years after taking up a bow, 17-year-old Justin Huish won the intermediate age division at the National Archery Assn.'s Outdoor Target Championships, significant victories at the 1993 US collegiate championships and the 1995 US Target Championships. He had only been on the US National Team since 1994.

Justin Huish qualified for the 2000 Summer Olympics, but withdrew later that year.
