= Changte Lalremsaga =

Indian archer

Personal information
- Nationality: Indian
- Born: 28 December 1973 (age 51)

Sport
- Sport: Archery

Changte Lalremsaga (born 28 December 1973) is an Indian archer. He competed at the 1992 Summer Olympics and the 1996 Summer Olympics.
