= Paul Vermeiren =

Belgian archer (born 1963)

Personal information
- Nationality: Belgian
- Born: 27 August 1963 (age 63) Herentals, Belgium

Sport
- Sport: Archery

Paul Vermeiren (born 27 August 1963) is a Belgian archer. He competed at the 1988 Summer Olympics, the 1992 Summer Olympics and the 1996 Summer Olympics.
