= Samo Medved =

Slovenian archer (born 1962)

Personal information
- Nationality: Slovenian
- Born: 22 March 1962 (age 63); Ljubljana, Yugoslavia

Sport
- Sport: Archery

Samo Medved (born 22 March 1962) is a Slovenian archer. He competed at the 1992 Summer Olympics and the 1996 Summer Olympics.
