= Limba Ram =

Indian archer

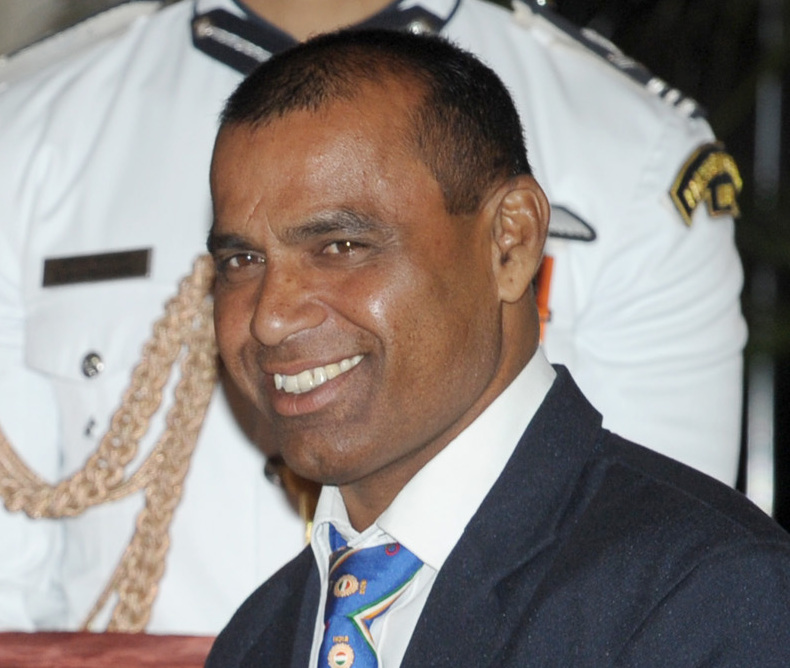
- Limba Ram in 2012

Personal information
- Nationality: Indian
- Born: October 30, 1972 (age 54) Saradeet, Rajasthan, India
- Height: 1.57 m (5 ft 2 in)
- Weight: 58 kg (128 lb)

Sport
- Country: India
- Sport: Archery
Medal record
Representing India
Men's Archery
Archery Asian Cup
Gold medal – first place	1989 Beijing	Men's Team
Silver medal – second place	1989 Beijing	Men's Individual
Asian Archery Championships
Gold medal – first place	1992 Beijing	Men's Individual
Commonwealth Archery Championships
Gold medal – first place	1995 New Delhi	Men's Team
Silver medal – second place	1995 New Delhi	Men's Individual

Limba Ram is an Indian archer who represented India in international competitions, including three Olympics. He equalled an archery world record in 1992 at the Asian Archery Championships in Beijing. He was awarded the Padma Shri Award in 2012.

== Early life ==
Limba Ram was born in Saradeet Village (Jhadol tahsil, Udaipur district, Rajasthan state, India) on January 30, 1972. His family belongs to the Ahari tribe and because of poverty, Limba Ram relied on hunting birds like sparrows, partridges as well as other animals in the jungle with his indigenous bamboo bow and reed arrows. In 1987, one of his Uncles brought news that government would be conducting trials in the nearby village of Makradeo to train good archers. At this trial, 15-year-old Limba Ram and three other boys (among whom was future Arjuna Award winning Archer Shyam Lal) were spotted by selectors of the Sports Authority of India. Thereafter, all four boys were sent to New Delhi for the Special Area Games Programme, a four-month training camp under the coaching of R. S. Sodhi.

The Akhil Bharatiya Vanavasi Kalyan Ashram, the RSS-linked organisation that works for tribal welfare, has claimed that it identified Limba Ram through its Ekalavya Khelkood Pratiyogita competition.

== Career ==
Limba Ram was spotted and trained by the Sports Authority of India in 1987. In that same year, he became overall champion at the National Junior Level Archery Tournaments held in Bangalore. Just one year later, in 1988, Limba Ram would be victorious at the National Senior Level Tournament, earning for himself not just the title of overall champion but also the honour of representing his country at the Summer Olympics held that year in Seoul. In 1989, he reached the quarterfinals of the World Archery Championships held in Lausanne, Switzerland. In the same year, he would finish in second place at the Asian Cup in Individuals and India got team Gold.

In 1990, he helped India finish fourth at the Beijing Asian Games. He represented India in three Olympics. In 1992, he equalled the world record of Takayoshi Matsushita in the Beijing Asian Archery Championships in the 30 meters event, with a score of 358/360 to bag the gold medal. After receiving this news Parliament of India congratulated Limba Ram. In 1992 at the Barcelona Olympics, Ram finished 23rd in the ranking round, and got eliminated in the knockout round of 32. In 1995, he stood with second rank and the team would win a gold medal at the Commonwealth Games held in New Delhi. In 1996 he was National Champion with Asian Record. And also participated in 1996 Atlanta Summer Olympics.

== Awards ==
The Government of India honoured him with the Arjuna award in 1991 and Padma Shri in 2012.

== Decline ==
In 1996 Limba Ram joined TATA Group. In the same year he suffered from serious shoulder injury while playing football in training camp at Kolkata. He was unable to shoot a bow and lost his focus and concentration. He discontinued his job with TATA due to this problem. He joined Punjab National Bank in 2001 as a cashier. In 2003, he participated in third National ranking prize money archery tournament organised by Sports Authority of India but finished 16th.

== Present status ==
On January 10, 2009, to 2012 London Olympics Archery Association of India signed and appointed Limba Ram as National Archery Chief Coach for 2009 World Cup and won 3 Gold, 3 Silver, 4 Bronze medals, 2010 World Cup Medals: 2 Gold, 3Silver, 2 Bronze Commonwealth Games and won 3 Gold, 1 Silver and 4 Bronze medals under his coaching, 2010 Guangzhou Asian Games 1 Silver and 2 Bronze medals, 2011 World Cup Medals: 1 Gold,8 Silver, 2 Bronze, 2011 World Archery Championship Medals: 1 Silver, 2011 World Archery Youth Championship Medals: 1 Gold, 1 Silver, 2 Bronze and 2012 London Olympic Games, 2012 World Cup Medals: 1 Gold, 2 Silver Total 11 Golds, 20 Silvers and 16 Bronze medals under season 2009 to 2012 London Olympics his coaching, guidance and his achievement as National Chief Coach of Indian Archery.
