= Archery at the 2004 Summer Olympics – Men's individual =

Men's individual at the Games of the XXVIII Olympiad
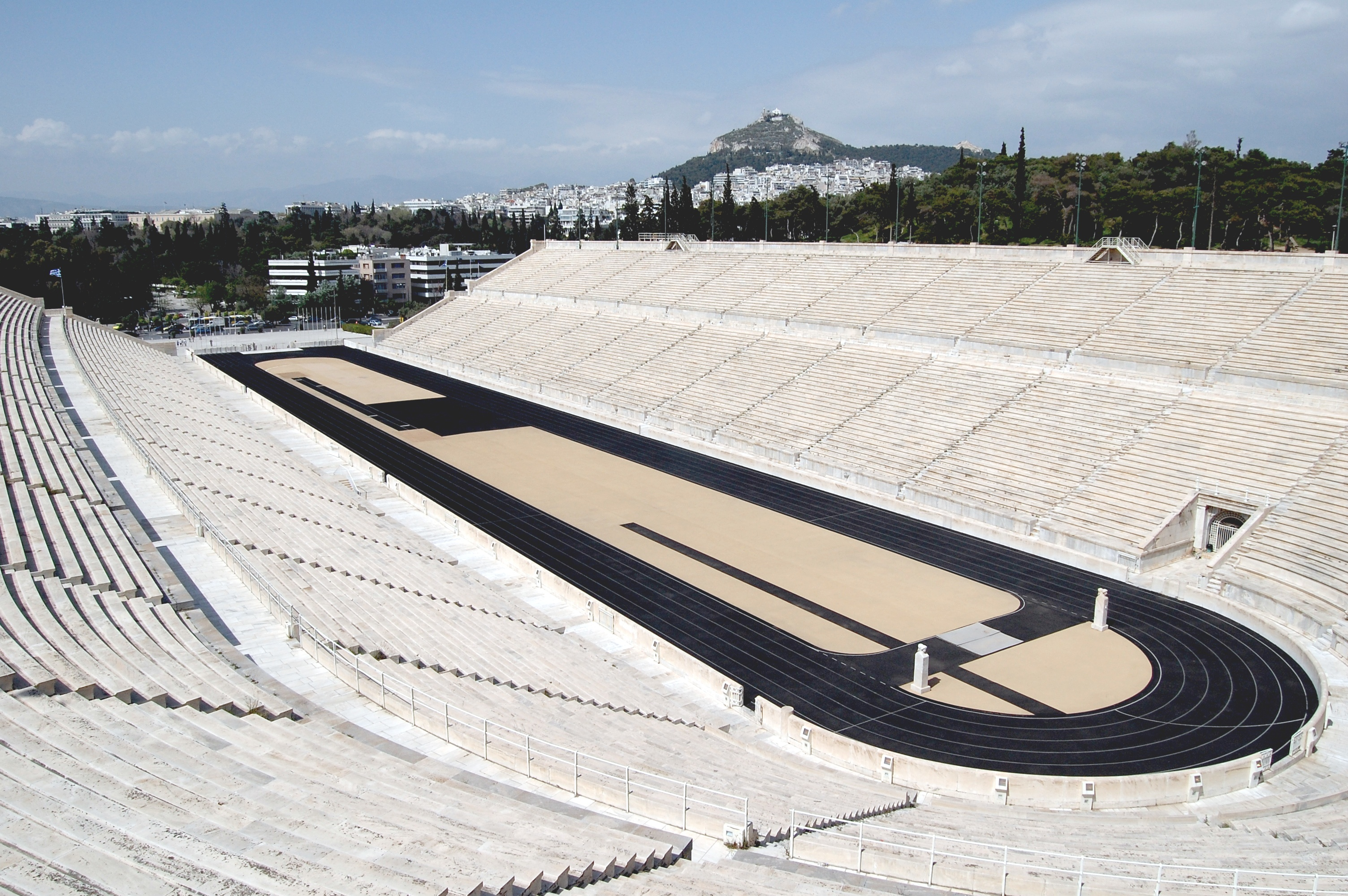
- Panathinaiko Stadium, where the event was held
- Venue: Panathinaiko Stadium
- Dates: 15–19 August 2004

Medalists
1st place, gold medalist(s)		Marco Galiazzo	Italy
2nd place, silver medalist(s)		Hiroshi Yamamoto	Japan
3rd place, bronze medalist(s)		Tim Cuddihy	Australia

The men's individual archery event at the 2004 Summer Olympics was part of the archery programme. Its final was held on 19 August at the Panathinaiko Stadium.

== Ranking round ==
The Korean archers, medal favorites in both men's and women's competition, ranked 1st (Im Dong-hyun), 4th (Park Kyung-mo), and 5th (Jang Yong-ho) in the men's individual ranking round. Im's score of 687 set a new world record for 72 arrows, breaking the previous one set in 1995 by fellow Korean Shim Young-sung. It is not recognized by the International Olympic Committee as an Olympic record, however, as the ranking round took place on 12 August, before the 2004 opening ceremony. The round was held at Dekelia Air Force Base.

The bracket setup (with 4th- and 5th-ranked archers facing off in the quarterfinals if undefeated and the winner of that match facing the 1st-ranked archer in the semifinals) meant that the Korean men could do no better than gold and bronze. Marco Galiazzo of Italy in 2nd and Magnus Petersson of Sweden in 3rd rounded out the top five, with Dmytro Hrachov in 6th with the same score as 5th-ranked Jang of Korea.

The three medalists of the 2000 Summer Olympics, Simon Fairweather, Vic Wunderle, and Wietse van Alten, all competed in 2004. None placed higher than 14th in the ranking round (van Alten) and only Wunderle made it to the quarterfinals.

Rank	Archer	Nation	Score
1	Im Dong-hyun	South Korea	687
2	Magnus Petersson	Sweden	673
3	Marco Galiazzo	Italy	672
4	Park Kyung-mo	South Korea	672
5	Jang Yong-ho	South Korea	671
6	Dmytro Hrachov	Ukraine	671
7	Balzhinima Tsyrempilov	Russia	668
8	Hasse Pavia Lind	Denmark	666
9	Hiroshi Yamamoto	Japan	664
10	Chen Szu Yuan	Chinese Taipei	663
11	Liu Ming-huang	Chinese Taipei	663
12	Tim Cuddihy	Australia	663
13	Jocelyn de Grandis	France	663
14	Wietse van Alten	Netherlands	661
15	Viktor Ruban	Ukraine	660
16	Butch Johnson	United States	660
17	Yuji Hamano	Japan	660
18	Wang Cheng-pang	Chinese Taipei	659
19	Ilario Di Buò	Italy	659
20	Simon Fairweather	Australia	658
21	Michael Frankenberg	Germany	657
22	Majhi Sawaiyan	India	657
23	Jacek Proć	Poland	657
24	Michele Frangilli	Italy	654
25	Oleksandr Serdyuk	Ukraine	654
26	Jonas Andersson	Sweden	653
27	Xue Haifeng	China	653
28	Yong Fujun	China	652
29	Stanislav Zabrodskiy	Kazakhstan	651
30	Juan Rene Serrano	Mexico	651
31	Laurence Godfrey	Great Britain	650
32	Tarundeep Rai	India	647
33	Alexandros Karageorgiou	Greece	647
34	Hasan Orbay	Turkey	647
35	Eduardo Magaña	Mexico	646
36	Pieter Custers	Netherlands	646
37	Takaharu Furukawa	Japan	646
38	Jorge Pablo Chapoy	Mexico	645
39	David Barnes	Australia	641
40	Felipe López	Spain	641
41	Lockoneco Lockoneco	Indonesia	641
42	Yavor Hristov	Bulgaria	641
43	Vic Wunderle	United States	639
44	Dmitry Nevmerzhitskiy	Russia	639
45	Anton Prylepau	Belarus	638
46	Mattias Eriksson	Sweden	637
47	John Magera	United States	637
48	Satyadev Prasad	India	634
49	Ron van der Hoff	Netherlands	633
50	Jonathan Ohayon	Canada	632
51	Ricardo Merlos	El Salvador	630
52	Tashi Peljor	Bhutan	627
53	Thomas Naglieri	France	626
54	Ken Uprichard	New Zealand	623
55	Jeff Henckels	Luxembourg	623
56	Franck Fisseux	France	622
57	Ismail Essam	Egypt	602
58	Georgios Kalogiannidis	Greece	601
59	Maged Youssef	Egypt	599
60	Apostolos Nanos	Greece	585
61	Rob Elder	Fiji	583
62	Sifa Taumoepeau	Tonga	563
63	Phoutlamphay Thiamphasone	Laos	557
64	Yehya Bundhun	Mauritius	494

== Competition bracket ==
=== Section 1 ===
Round of 64
1	Im Dong-hyun (KOR)	152
64	Yehya Bundhun (MRI)	109
33	Alexandros Karageorgiou (GRE)	147
32	Tarundeep Rai (IND)	143
48	Satyadev Prasad (IND)	155
17	Yuji Hamano (JPN)	150
49	Ron van der Hoff (NED)	145
16	Butch Johnson (USA)	135
9	Hiroshi Yamamoto (JPN)	155
56	Franck Fisseux (FRA)	147
24	Michele Frangilli (ITA)	153
41	Lockoneco Lockoneco (INA)	141
25	Oleksandr Serdyuk (UKR)	164
40	Felipe López (ESP)	141
8	Hasse Pavia Lind (DEN)	158
57	Ismail Essam (EGY)	110

Round of 32
1	Im Dong-hyun (KOR)	171
33	Alexandros Karageorgiou (GRE)	159
48	Satyadev Prasad (IND)	158
49	Ron van der Hoff (NED)	155
9	Hiroshi Yamamoto (JPN)	162
24	Michele Frangilli (ITA)	154
25	Oleksandr Serdyuk (UKR)	165
8	Hasse Pavia Lind (DEN)	164

Round of 16
1	Im Dong-hyun (KOR)	167
48	Satyadev Prasad (IND)	165
9	Hiroshi Yamamoto (JPN)	168
25	Oleksandr Serdyuk (UKR)	160

Quarterfinals
1	Im Dong-hyun (KOR)	110
9	Hiroshi Yamamoto (JPN)	111

=== Section 2 ===
Round of 64
5	Jang Yong-ho (KOR)	162
60	Apostolos Nanos (GRE)	131
37	Takaharu Furukawa (JPN)	146
28	Yong Fujun (CHN)	143
21	Michael Frankenberg (GER)	140
44	Dmitry Nevmerzhitskiy (RUS)	135
12	Tim Cuddihy (AUS)	148
53	Thomas Naglieri (FRA)	127
52	Tashi Peljor (BHU)	161
13	Jocelyn de Grandis (FRA)	136
45	Anton Prylepau (BLR)	141
20	Simon Fairweather (AUS)	137
29	Stanislav Zabrodskiy (KAZ)	145
36	Pieter Custers (NED)	141
4	Park Kyung-mo (KOR)	154
61	Rob Elder (FIJ)	138

Round of 32
5	Jang Yong-ho (KOR)	166
37	Takaharu Furukawa (JPN)	163
21	Michael Frankenberg (GER)	163
12	Tim Cuddihy (AUS)	164
52	Tashi Peljor (BHU)	152
45	Anton Prylepau (BLR)	155
29	Stanislav Zabrodskiy (KAZ)	164^{10, 9}
4	Park Kyung-mo (KOR)	164^{10,10}

Round of 16
5	Jang Yong-ho (KOR)	165
12	Tim Cuddihy (AUS)	166
45	Anton Prylepau (BLR)	166
4	Park Kyung-mo (KOR)	173

Quarterfinals
12	Tim Cuddihy (AUS)	112
4	Park Kyung-mo (KOR)	111

=== Section 3 ===
Round of 64
3	Marco Galiazzo (ITA)	156
62	Sifa Taumoepeau (TGA)	122
30	Juan Rene Serrano (MEX)	148
35	Eduardo Magaña (MEX)	138
19	Ilario Di Buò (ITA)	151
46	Mattias Eriksson (SWE)	146
14	Wietse van Alten (NED)	152
51	Ricardo Merlos (ESA)	151
11	Liu Ming-huang (TPE)	148
54	Ken Uprichard (NZL)	145
43	Vic Wunderle (USA)	145
22	Majhi Sawaiyan (IND)	128
27	Xue Haifeng (CHN)	162
38	Jorge Pablo Chapoy (MEX)	153
6	Dmytro Hrachov (UKR)	154
59	Maged Youssef (EGY)	128

Round of 32
3	Marco Galiazzo (ITA)	164
30	Juan Rene Serrano (MEX)	163
19	di Buo (ITA)	164
14	Wietse van Alten (NED)	160
11	Liu Ming-huang (TPE)	160
43	Vic Wunderle (USA)	164
27	Xue Haifeng (CHN)	162
6	Dmytro Hrachov (UKR)	161

Round of 16
3	Marco Galiazzo (ITA)	162
19	Ilario Di Buò (ITA)	155
43	Vic Wunderle (USA)	165
27	Xue Haifeng (CHN)	164

Quarterfinals
3	Marco Galiazzo (ITA)	109
43	Vic Wunderle (USA)	108

=== Section 4 ===
Round of 64
7	Balzhinima Tsyrempilov (RUS)	148
58	Georgios Kalogiannidis (GRE)	133
26	Jonas Andersson (SWE)	160
39	David Barnes (AUS)	151
42	Yavor Hristov (BUL)	133
23	Jacek Proć (POL)	132
10	Chen Szu Yuan (TPE)	136
55	Jeff Henckels (LUX)	132
15	Viktor Ruban (UKR)	157
50	Jonathan Ohayon (CAN)	140
18	Wang Cheng-pang (TPE)	159
47	John Magera (USA)	144
31	Laurence Godfrey (GBR)	157
34	Hasan Orbay (TUR)	155
2	Magnus Petersson (SWE)	158
63	Phoutlamphay Thiamphasone (LAO)	95

Round of 32
7	Tsyrempilov (RUS)	162
26	Jonas Andersson (SWE)	160
42	Yavor Hristov (BUL)	159
10	Chen Szu Yuan (TPE)	170
15	Viktor Ruban (UKR)	167^{9}
18	Wang Cheng-pang (TPE)	167^{8}
31	Laurence Godfrey (GBR)	163
2	Magnus Petersson (SWE)	162

Round of 16
7	Balzhinima Tsyrempilov (RUS)	161
10	Chen Szu Yuan (TPE)	169
15	Viktor Ruban (UKR)	162
31	Laurence Godfrey (GBR)	167

Quarterfinals
10	Chen Szu Yuan (TPE)	108
31	Laurence Godfrey (GBR)	110

=== Finals ===
Semifinals
9	Hiroshi Yamamoto (JPN)	115^{10}
12	Tim Cuddihy (AUS)	115^{9}
3	Marco Galiazzo (ITA)	110
31	Laurence Godfrey (GBR)	108

Finals
9	Hiroshi Yamamoto (JPN)	109
3	Marco Galiazzo (ITA)	111
Third place
12	Tim Cuddihy (AUS)	113
31	Laurence Godfrey (GBR)	112

== Event summary ==
Round of 64

The first round of elimination, held on 16 August, narrowed the field from 64 archers to 32 in a standard single-elimination bracket. The loser of each match received a final rank between 33 and 64, depending on his score in the round. Each archer fired six ends of three arrows, for a total possible score of 180. Oleksandr Serdyuk of Ukraine had the highest score in the round, with 164.

The first upset of the day belonged to 43rd-ranked Vic Wunderle of the United States, who defeated 22nd-ranked Majhi Sawaiyan of India. The United States were on the losing end of an even larger upset, though, when Butch Johnson lost to Ron van der Hoff of the Netherlands. The biggest upset occurred when 52nd-ranked Tashi Peljor of Bhutan defeated 13th-ranked Jocelyn de Grandis of France to become the lowest ranked archer to advance.

Round of 32

As in the round of 64, archers who advanced to the round of 32 fired six ends of three arrows in the second round of elimination. This round, on 18 August, narrowed the field from 32 to 16 archers, with winners advancing and losers receiving a final rank between 17 and 32 depending on their score in the round. Im Dong-hyun of Korea scored the highest in the round, missing the Olympic record by 1 point with a score of 171. 48th-ranked Satyadev Prasad of India was the lowest ranked archer to advance.

Vic Wunderle of the United States continued to have success in head-to-head competition, eliminating 11th-ranked Wang Cheng-pang of Chinese Taipei. In an astonishing match, 31st-ranked Laurence Godfrey, Great Britain eked out a victory over 2nd-ranked Magnus Petersson of Sweden. Two other top-ten-ranked archers fell when 27th-ranked Xue Haifeng of China defeated 6th-ranked Dmytro Hrachov of Ukraine and 25th-ranked Hasse Pavia Lind lost to Oleksandr Serdyuk. One of the Korean archers, Park Kyung-mo, nearly fell to Kazakhstani Stanislav Zabrodskiy when Zabrodskiy tied Park through the first 18 arrows and scored a 10 on the first tie-break. Park also scored a 10, and followed it up with a second 10 which Zabrodskiy could not match. A tie-break was also needed in the match between Viktor Ruban of Ukraine and Wang Cheng-pang of Chinese Taipei, which Ruban won 9–8.

Round of 16

The round of 16 was held on 19 August and followed the same 18-arrow format as the previous two rounds as it narrowed the field to eight quarterfinalists.

Quarterfinals

The first round of 12-arrow matches was the quarterfinals on 19 August. Winners advanced to the semifinals while losers received a final rank between 5 and 8 depending on score in the quarterfinals. The high score of the round was notched by Tim Cuddihy, with 112. In a see-saw battle, Marco Galiazzo took a lead over Vic Wunderle in the third end. In a tense final end, Wunderle closed the gap. Galiazzo, needing an 8 to tie on the last arrow, shot a 9 to advance and end Wunderle's run. In a surprise, both of the remaining Korean archers fell to Hiroshi Yamamoto and Tim Cuddihy in 1-point matches eliminating them from medal contention. Laurence Godfrey had the most decisive victory of the round, a still-close 2-point victory of Chen Szu Yuan.

Semifinals

Yamamoto and Cuddihy both tied the Olympic record for a 12-arrow match (set by Oh Kyo-moon in 1996) by tying their semifinal match at 115 on 19 August. In the tie-breaker, Yamamoto shot first and hit a 10. Cuddihy was unable to match this, shooting a 9 to drop out of gold medal contention.

Bronze medal match

The bronze medal match was held on 19 August as well. The winner received the bronze medal while the loser took fourth place. Cuddihy defeated Godfrey in a close match.

Final

The gold medal match on 19 August pitted a first-time-Olympian Italian against a veteran Japanese archer, with the favored Koreans being conspicuously absent. The match consisted of 12 arrows, with the winner taking gold and the loser receiving a silver medal.

With a pair of 10s in the first end, Hiroshi Yamamoto took a quick lead of 1 point over Marco Galiazzo. In the second end, Galiazzo missed perfection by only 1 point, scoring 29 to Yamamoto's 27 to reverse the lead. He hit another pair of 10s in the third end, increasing his lead to 2 points going into the final end. Galiazzo maintained the lead through the final three arrows, winning Italy's first Olympic gold medal in archery. Yamamoto's silver was his second Olympic medal, joining the bronze medal that he won in 1984.
