= 2005 World Archery Championships – Men's individual recurve =

The men's individual recurve competition at the 2005 World Archery Championships took place in June 2005 in Madrid, Spain. 143 archers entered the competition. Following a qualifying 144 arrow FITA round on 22 June, the top 64 archers qualified for the 6-round knockout tournament, drawn according to their qualification round scores. The semi-finals and finals then took place on 27 June.

== Qualifying ==
The following archers were the leading 8 qualifiers:

1. (South Korea) Park Kyung-mo (1st round)
2. (South Korea) Chung Jae-hun (Champion)
3. (Russia) Baljinima Tsyrempilov (2nd round)
4. (India) Tarundeep Rai (4th place)
5. (Chinese Taipei) Kuo Cheng-wei (1st round)
6. (South Korea) Choi Won-Jong (3rd place)
7. (South Korea) Han Seung-hoon (Quarterfinal)
8. (United Kingdom) Larry Godfrey (1st round)

== Full draw ==
=== Section 1 ===
1st round
1	(South Korea) Park Kyung-mo	154
64	(Brazil) Leonardo de Carvalho	158
33	(United States) Joseph McGlyn	163
32	(Ukraine) Oleksandr Sardyuk	162
17	(Italy) Marco Galiazzo	160
48	(Mexico) Juan René Serrano	158
49	(Canada) Crispin Duenas	155
16	(Netherlands) Pieter Custers	163
9	(Australia) Matthew Gray	164
56	(Brazil) Marcos Bortoloto	157
41	(United Kingdom) Michael Peart
24	(Japan) Ryuichi Moriya	w/o
25	(United Kingdom) Alan Wills	157
40	(Australia) Christopher Madeley	163
57	(Malaysia) Cheng Chu Sian	163
8	(United Kingdom) Laurence Godfrey	159

2nd round
64	(Brazil) Leonardo de Carvalho	152
33	(United States) Joseph McGlyn	151
17	(Italy) Marco Galiazzo	154
16	(Netherlands) Pieter Custers	159
9	(Australia) Matthew Gray	159
24	(Japan) Ryuichi Moriya	161
40	(Australia) Christopher Madeley	156*
57	(Malaysia) Cheng Chu Sian	156

3rd round
64	(Brazil) Leonardo de Carvalho	159
16	(Netherlands) Pieter Custers	159*
24	(Japan) Ryuichi Moriya	161
40	(Australia) Christopher Madeley	157

Quarterfinal
16	(Netherlands) Pieter Custers	111
24	(Japan) Ryuichi Moriya	111*

=== Section 2 ===
1st round
5	(Chinese Taipei) Kuo Cheng-wei	154
60	(Czech Republic) Jakub Mikeska	158
37	(Sweden) Jonas Andersson	145
28	(United States) Butch Johnson	160
21	(Italy) Ilario di Buo	155
44	(Japan) Ryota Amano	160
53	(Bulgaria) Yavor Hristov	162
12	(Malaysia) Muhammad Marbawi	161
13	(Chinese Taipei) Liu Ming-huang	160
52	(Czech Republic) Michal Hodac	157
45	(China) Yong Fujun	165
20	(Poland) Piotr Piątek	158
29	(United States) Victor Wunderle	164
36	(China) Wu Fengbo	159
61	(Mexico) Eduardo Vélez	158
4	(India) Tarundeep Rai	164

2nd round
60	(Czech Republic) Jakub Mikeska	155
28	(United States) Butch Johnson	160
44	(Japan) Ryota Amano	150
53	(Bulgaria) Yavor Hristov	154
13	(Chinese Taipei) Liu Ming-huang	154
45	(China) Yong Fujun	154*
29	(United States) Victor Wunderle	150
4	(India) Tarundeep Rai	161

3rd round
28	(United States) Butch Johnson	160
53	(Bulgaria) Yavor Hristov	155
45	(China) Yong Fujun	161
4	(India) Tarundeep Rai	164

Quarterfinal
28	(United States) Butch Johnson	108
4	(India) Tarundeep Rai	110

=== Section 3 ===
1st round
3	(Russia) Baljinima Tsyrempilov	168
62	(Germany) Michael Frankenberg	162
35	(Russia) Erdem Zhigzhitov	163
30	(Malaysia) Wan Khalmizam	162
19	(Chinese Taipei) Wang Cheng-pang	163
46	(Germany) Sebastian Rohrberg	158
51	(Australia) Simon Fairweather	154
14	(Ukraine) Viktor Ruban	158
11	(Netherlands) Wietse van Alten	169
54	(Netherlands) Henk Vogels	152
43	(Italy) Francesco Lunelli	152
22	(India) Jayanta Talukdar	159
27	(Japan) Takaharu Furukawa	158
38	(Belgium) Nico Hendrickx	168
59	(Norway) Bård Nesteng	151
6	(South Korea) Choi Won-jong	170

2nd round
3	(Russia) Baljinima Tsyrempilov	157
35	(Russia) Erdem Zhigzhitov	158
19	(Chinese Taipei) Wang Cheng-pang	158
14	(Ukraine) Viktor Ruban	159
11	(Netherlands) Wietse van Alten	151
22	(India) Jayanta Talukdar	167
38	(Belgium) Nico Hendrickx	148
6	(South Korea) Choi Won-jong	161

3rd round
35	(Russia) Erdem Zhigzhitov	150
14	(Ukraine) Viktor Ruban	162
22	(India) Jayanta Talukdar	158
6	(South Korea) Choi Won-jong	159

Quarterfinal
14	(Ukraine) Viktor Ruban	107
6	(South Korea) Choi Won-jong	109

=== Section 4 ===
1st round
7	(South Korea) Han Seung-hoon	170
58	(Russia) Alexey Nikolaev	164
39	(China) Xue Haifeng	158
26	(Poland) Jacek Proć	155
23	(Australia) Tim Cuddihy	167
42	(Ukraine) Markiyan Ivashko	162
55	(India) Robin Hansda	164
10	(Italy) Michele Frangilli	171
15	(India) Gautam Singh	159*
50	(Germany) Jens Pieper	159
47	(Belarus) Anton Prilepau	157
18	(Japan) Hiroshi Yamamoto	170
31	(Chinese Taipei) Chen Szu-yuan	160
34	(Turkey) Tunc Kucukkayalar	155
63	(Belarus) Siarhei Vitorski	158
2	(South Korea) Chung Jae-hun	171

2nd round
7	(South Korea) Han Seung-hoon	165
39	(China) Xue Haifeng	163
23	(Australia) Tim Cuddihy	158
10	(Italy) Michele Frangilli	157
15	(India) Gautam Singh	160
18	(Japan) Hiroshi Yamamoto	152
31	(Chinese Taipei) Chen Szu-yuan	158
2	(South Korea) Chung Jae-hun	160

3rd round
7	(South Korea) Han Seung-hoon	161
23	(Australia) Tim Cuddihy	157
15	(India) Gautam Singh	159
2	(South Korea) Chung Jae-hun	162

Quarterfinal
7	(South Korea) Han Seung-hoon	112
2	(South Korea) Chung Jae-hun	114

== Finals ==
Quarterfinals
16	(Netherlands) Pieter Custers	111
24	(Japan) Ryuichi Moriya	111*
28	(United States) Butch Johnson	108
4	(India) Tarundeep Rai	110
14	(Ukraine) Viktor Ruban	107
6	(South Korea) Choi Won-jong	109
7	(South Korea) Han Seung-hoon	112
2	(South Korea) Chung Jae-hun	114

Semifinals
24	(Japan) Ryuichi Moriya	107
4	(India) Tarundeep Rai	104
6	(South Korea) Choi Won-jong	104
2	(South Korea) Chung Jae-hun	113

Finals
24	(Japan) Ryuichi Moriya	101
2	(South Korea) Chung Jae-hun	102
Third place
4	(India) Tarundeep Rai	106
6	(South Korea) Choi Won-jong	112
