= Chinese Taipei at the 2004 Summer Olympics =

- Chinese Taipei Olympic flag
- IOC code: TPE
- NOC: Chinese Taipei Olympic Committee
- Website: www.tpenoc.net (in Chinese and English)

in Athens
- Competitors: 89 in 14 sports
- Flag bearer: Chen Chih-yuan
- Medals Ranked 31st: Gold 2 Silver 2 Bronze 1 Total 5

Summer Olympics appearances (overview)
- 1956; 1960; 1964; 1968; 1972; 1976–1980; 1984; 1988; 1992; 1996; 2000; 2004; 2008; 2012; 2016; 2020; 2024

Other related appearances
- Republic of China (1924–1948)

Chinese Taipei competed at the 2004 Summer Olympics in Athens, Greece, from 13 to 29 August 2004. "Chinese Taipei" was the designated name used by Taiwan to participate in some international organizations and almost all sporting events, including the Olympic Games. Neither the common name "Taiwan" nor the official name "Republic of China" would be used primarily due to opposition from the People's Republic of China. This also was the nation's eighth consecutive appearance at the Olympics.

The Chinese Taipei Olympic Committee sent the nation's largest delegation to the Games in Olympic history. A total of 89 athletes, 50 men and 39 women, competed only in 14 different sports. This was also the youngest delegation in Chinese Taipei's Olympic history, with more than half under the age of 25, and many of them were expected to reach their peak in time for the 2008 Summer Olympics in Beijing. Baseball player Chen Chih-yuan was appointed by the committee to carry the Chinese Taipei flag in the opening ceremony.

Chinese Taipei left Athens with a total of five Olympic medals (two golds, two silver, and one bronze), being considered its most successful Olympics. Chinese Taipei's highlight of the Games came with a remarkable milestone for taekwondo jin Chen Shih-hsin and Chu Mu-yen, claiming the nation's first ever gold medals in Olympic history. Meanwhile, another taekwondo jin Huang Chih-hsiung picked up his second medal with a sterling silver in the men's lightweight division, adding it to his bronze from Sydney four years earlier.

== Medalists ==
Medal	Name	Sport	Event	Date
Gold	Chen Shih-hsin	Taekwondo	Women's 49 kg	August 26
Gold	Chu Mu-yen	Taekwondo	Men's 58 kg	August 26
Silver	Chen Szu-yuan; Liu Ming-huang; Wang Cheng-pang	Archery	Men's team	August 21
Silver	Huang Chih-hsiung	Taekwondo	Men's 68 kg	August 27
Bronze	Chen Li-ju; Wu Hui-ju; Yuan Shu-chi	Archery	Women's team	August 20

== Archery ==
Three Chinese Taipei archers qualified each for the men's and women's individual archery, and a spot each for both men's and women's teams.

Men

Athlete	Event	Ranking round		Round of 64	Round of 32	Round of 16	Quarterfinals	Semifinals	Final / BM	
Athlete	Event	Score	Seed	Opposition Score	Opposition Score	Opposition Score	Opposition Score	Opposition Score	Opposition Score	Rank
Chen Szu-yuan	Individual	663	10	Henckels (LUX); W 136–132	Hristov (BUL); W 170–159	Tsyrempilov (RUS); W 169–161	Godfrey (GBR); L 108–110	Did not advance		
Liu Ming-huang	Individual	663	11	Uprichard (NZL); W 148–145	Wunderle (USA); L 160–164	Did not advance				
Wang Cheng-pang	Individual	659	18	Magera (USA); W 159–144	Ruban (UKR); L 167 (8)–167 (9)	Did not advance				
Chen Szu-yuan; Liu Ming-huang; Wang Cheng-pang	Team	1985	2	—		Bye	Australia; W 250–247	United States; W 244–243	South Korea; L 245–251	2nd place, silver medalist(s)

Women

Athlete	Event	Ranking round		Round of 64	Round of 32	Round of 16	Quarterfinals	Semifinals	Final / BM	
Athlete	Event	Score	Seed	Opposition Score	Opposition Score	Opposition Score	Opposition Score	Opposition Score	Opposition Score	Rank
Chen Li-ju	Individual	617	45	Sharma (IND); L 133–142	Did not advance					
Wu Hui-ju	Individual	649	10	Nabieva (TJK); W 156–142	Hitzler (GER); W 156 (9)–156 (8)	Mospinek (POL); W 160–151	Lee S-J (KOR); L 103–104	Did not advance		
Yuan Shu-chi	Individual	658	6	Palekha (UKR); W 162–158	Sobieraj (POL); W 158–149	Kumari (IND); W 166–148	Yun M-J (KOR); W 107–105	Lee S-J (KOR); L 98–104	Williamson (GBR); L 104–105	4
Chen Li-ju; Wu Hui-ju; Yuan Shu-chi	Team	1924	3	—		Japan; W 240–226	Germany; W 233–230	China; L 226–230	France; W 242–228	3rd place, bronze medalist(s)

== Athletics ==
Taiwanese athletes have so far achieved qualifying standards in the following athletics events (up to a maximum of 3 athletes in each event at the 'A' Standard, and 1 at the 'B' Standard).

Key

- Note–Ranks given for track events are within the athlete's heat only
- Q = Qualified for the next round
- q = Qualified for the next round as a fastest loser or, in field events, by position without achieving the qualifying target
- NR = National record
- N/A = Round not applicable for the event
- Bye = Athlete not required to compete in round

Men

Athlete	Event	Final	
Athlete	Event	Result	Rank
Wu Wen-chien	Marathon	2:23:54	56

Women

Athlete	Event	Final	
Athlete	Event	Result	Rank
Hsu Yu-fang	Marathon	2:55:58	57

== Badminton ==
Athlete	Event	Round of 32	Round of 16	Quarterfinal	Semifinal	Final / BM	
Athlete	Event	Opposition Score	Opposition Score	Opposition Score	Opposition Score	Opposition Score	Rank
Chien Yu-hsiu	Men's singles	Gade (DEN); L 6–15, 1–15	Did not advance				
Cheng Shao-chieh	Women's singles	Ling W T (HKG); W 11–9, 11–8	Jun J-Y (KOR); W 3–11, 11–6, 11–6	Gong Rn (CHN); L 3–11, 3–11	Did not advance		
Cheng Wen-hsing; Chien Yu-chin	Women's doubles	Nichol / Reid (CAN); W 15–0, 15–10	Wei Yl / Zhao Tt (CHN); L 15–13, 7–15, 5–15	Did not advance			
Cheng Wen-hsing; Tsai Chia-hsin	Mixed doubles	Dednam / Uys (RSA); W 15–3, 15–9	Gao L / Zhang J (CHN); L 5–15, 2–15	Did not advance			

== Baseball ==
Roster

Manager: 85 – Hsu Sheng-ming

Coaches: 29 – Lee Lai-fa, 4 – Lin I-tseng, 80 – Mitsujiro Sakai

Pos.	No.	Player	Date of birth (age)	Bats	Throws	Club
P	1	Wang Chien-Ming	31 March 1981 (aged 23)			(United States) Trenton Thunder
IF	6	Tsai Feng-An	20 November 1975 (aged 28)			(Taiwan) Brother Elephants
IF	13	Yung-Chi Chen	13 July 1983 (aged 21)			(United States) Everett AquaSox
IF	17	Huang Chung-Yi	12 October 1967 (aged 36)			(Taiwan) Sinon Bulls
P	18	Pan Wei-Lun	5 March 1982 (aged 22)			(Taiwan) Uni-President Lions
P	19	Lin Ying-Chieh	1 May 1981 (aged 23)			(Taiwan) Macoto Cobras
OF	23	Peng Cheng-Min	6 August 1978 (aged 26)			(Taiwan) Brother Elephants
OF	24	Lin Wei-Chu	22 January 1979 (aged 25)			(Japan) Hanshin Tigers
P	25	Tu Chang-Wei	11 May 1982 (aged 22)			(Taiwan) Chinese Culture University
C	27	Yeh Chun-Chang	28 January 1978 (aged 26)			(Taiwan) Sinon Bulls
IF	31	Cheng Chang-Ming	28 January 1978 (aged 26)			(Taiwan) Chinatrust Whales
P	32	Huang Chun-Chung	25 April 1982 (aged 22)			(United States) Boston Red Sox minor league restricted list
C	34	Kao Chih-kang	7 February 1981 (aged 23)			Taiwan Cooperative Bank baseball team
P	46	Yang Chien-Fu	22 April 1979 (aged 25)			(Taiwan) Sinon Bulls
IF	49	Chang Tai-Shan	31 October 1976 (aged 27)			(Taiwan) Sinon Bulls
OF	50	Chen Chih-yuan	27 October 1976 (aged 27)			(Taiwan) Brother Elephants
OF	52	Chen Chin-Feng	28 October 1977 (aged 26)			(United States) Las Vegas 51s
P	54	Chen Wei-Yin	12 July 1985 (aged 19)			(Japan) Chunichi Dragons
IF	55	Hsieh Chia-Shian	8 April 1976 (aged 28)			(Taiwan) Macoto Cobras
P	56	Keng Po-Hsuan	15 October 1984 (aged 19)			(Taiwan) Fubon Bull
P	71	Tsao Chin-Hui	2 October 1981 (aged 22)			(United States) Colorado Springs Sky Sox
IF	88	Cheng Chao-Hang	14 February 1977 (aged 27)			(Taiwan) Sinon Bulls
P	91	Lin En-Yu	25 March 1981 (aged 23)			(Taiwan) National Training Team
P	99	Chang Chih-Chia	6 May 1980 (aged 24)			(Japan) Seibu Lions

Round robin

Team	W	L	Tiebreaker
Japan	6	1	1-0
Cuba	6	1	0-1
Canada	5	2	-
Australia	4	3	-
Chinese Taipei	3	4	-
Netherlands	2	5	-
Greece	1	6	1-0
Italy	1	6	0-1

Team	1	2	3	4	5	6	7	8	9	R	H	E
Chinese Taipei	0	0	0	0	0	0	0	0	0	0	6	4
Canada	0	2	0	1	0	0	2	2	x	7	9	1
WP: Mike Johnson (1-0) LP: Chang Chih-Chia (0-1)

Team	1	2	3	4	5	6	7	8	9	R	H	E
Chinese Taipei	0	0	2	0	0	0	0	1	0	3	8	2
Australia	0	0	0	0	0	0	0	0	0	0	5	1
WP: Wang Chien-Ming (1-0) LP: John Stephens (0-1) Sv: Tsao Chin-Hui (1S)

Team	1	2	3	4	5	6	7	8	9	R	H	E
Greece	0	0	0	0	0	0	1	0	0	1	3	1
Chinese Taipei	0	0	1	1	0	0	5	0	x	7	9	0
WP: Pan Wei-lun (1-0) LP: Peter Soteropoulos (0-1); Home runs: GRE: C. A. Harris in 7th, 1 RBI; TPE: Chen C. Y. in 3rd, 1 RBI

Team	1	2	3	4	5	6	7	8	9	R	H	E
Cuba	0	1	2	0	0	0	0	5	2	10	15	1
Chinese Taipei	0	0	0	0	0	0	0	1	1	2	6	1
WP: Luis Borroto (1-0) LP: Tu Chang-Wei (0-1) Sv: Danny Betancourt (1S); Home runs: CUB: E. Sanchez in 2nd, 1 RBI; TPE: None

Team	1	2	3	4	5	6	7	8	9	R	H	E
Italy	0	0	1	1	0	1	0	0	2	5	7	0
Chinese Taipei	0	0	1	0	2	0	1	0	0	4	8	0
WP: Peter Nyari (1-0) LP: Yang Chien-Fu (0-1); Home runs: ITA: M. Chiarini in 4th, 1 RBI; J. Buccheri in 6th, 1 RBI; C. Liverziani in 9th, 2 RBIs; TPE: Peng C. M. in 7th, 1 RBI

Team	1	2	3	4	5	6	7	8	9	R	H	E
Chinese Taipei	0	0	3	0	0	0	0	0	0	3	10	1
Japan	0	0	0	0	0	3	0	0	1	4	10	0
WP: Hiroki Kuroda (2-0) LP: Tsao Chin-Hui (0-1-1); Home runs: TPE: Chen C. F. in 3rd, 3 RBIs; JPN: Y. Takahashi in 7th, 2 RBIs

Team	1	2	3	4	5	6	7	8	9	R	H	E
Chinese Taipei	0	1	0	1	0	1	2	0	0	5	9	1
Netherlands	0	0	0	1	0	0	0	0	0	1	1	6
WP: Pan Wei-lun (2-0) LP: Patrick de Lange (1-1); Home runs: TPE: None; NED: E. Kingsale in 4th, 1 RBI

== Cycling ==
=== Track ===
Time trial

Athlete	Event	Time	Rank
Lin Chih-hsun	Men's time trial	1:06.240	16

== Judo ==
Two Taiwanese judoka qualified for the 2004 Summer Olympics.

Athlete	Event	Round of 32	Round of 16	Quarterfinals	Semifinals	Repechage 1	Repechage 2	Repechage 3	Final / BM	
Athlete	Event	Opposition Result	Opposition Result	Opposition Result	Opposition Result	Opposition Result	Opposition Result	Opposition Result	Opposition Result	Rank
Liu Shu-yun	Women's −70 kg	Bye	Jacques (BEL); L 0010–0220	Did not advance						
Lee Hsiao-hung	Women's +78 kg	Dolgormaa (MGL); L 0001–0021	Did not advance							

== Rowing ==
Taiwanese rowers qualified the following boats:

Men

Athlete	Event	Heats		Repechage		Semifinals		Final	
Athlete	Event	Time	Rank	Time	Rank	Time	Rank	Time	Rank
Wang Ming-hui	Single sculls	7:28.16	3 R	7:09.99	3 SD/E	7:14.79	4 FE	7:07.84	25

Women

Athlete	Event	Heats		Repechage		Semifinals		Final	
Athlete	Event	Time	Rank	Time	Rank	Time	Rank	Time	Rank
Chiang Chien-ju	Single sculls	8:15.86	6 R	7:48.36	3 SC/D	8:05.71	2 FC	7:49.13	17

Qualification Legend: FA=Final A (medal); FB=Final B (non-medal); FC=Final C (non-medal); FD=Final D (non-medal); FE=Final E (non-medal); FF=Final F (non-medal); SA/B=Semifinals A/B; SC/D=Semifinals C/D; SE/F=Semifinals E/F; R=Repechage

== Shooting ==
Two Taiwanese shooters (one man and one woman) qualified to compete in the following events:

Men

Athlete	Event	Qualification		Final	
Athlete	Event	Points	Rank	Points	Rank
Chang Yi-ning	10 m air pistol	569	40	Did not advance	
Chang Yi-ning	50 m pistol	548	30	Did not advance	

Women

Athlete	Event	Qualification		Final	
Athlete	Event	Points	Rank	Points	Rank
Lin Yi-chun	Double trap	106	7	Did not advance	

== Softball ==
Roster

Chinese Taipei
Position	No.	Player	Birth	Club in 2004
IF	6	Yen Show-tzu	OCT/19/1971	Taipei
P	9	Lin Su-hua	OCT/12/1980	Taiwan National University
OF	10	Huang Hui-wen	FEB/03/1980
OF	11	Li Chiu-ching	OCT/09/1982
IF	12	Chen Miao-yi	FEB/23/1983	National Normal University
IF	13	Wang Shiao-ping	JUN/22/1981
IF	15	Chang Li-chiu	FEB/29/1980
IF	18	Wang Ya-fen	OCT/08/1969	Taipei
P	21	Lai Sheng-jung	DEC/27/1978	Taipei National University
P	22	Wu Chia-yen	JUN/28/1980	Taiwan National University
C	23	Yang Hui-chun	APR/10/1970	Taipei Country
P	26	Lin Po-jen	MAR/26/1981	National Taiwan University
OF	27	Tung Yun-chi	DEC/27/1981	Taichung
IF	28	Pan Tzu-hui	JAN/08/1983	Taipei
OF	36	Chen Feng-yin	DEC/19/1979	Taichung
Bench Coaches
Team; Manager		Ni Chao-liang	JUN/04/1951
Coach		Chiu Li-su	OCT/02/1969
Coach		Chen Jye-yen	FEB/02/1953

Round robin

Team	1	2	3	4	5	6	7	R	H	E
Chinese Taipei	0	0	0	0	0	0	0	0	4	1
Canada	0	0	0	2	0	0	X	2	5	0
WP: Lauren Bay (1-0) LP: Wu Chia-Yen (0-1)

Team	1	2	3	4	5	6	7	R	H	E
Chinese Taipei	0	0	0	0	0	0	0	0	2	4
Japan	1	4	0	0	1	0	X	6	13	0
WP: Sakai Hiroko (1-0) LP: Lin Su-Hua (0-1)

Team	1	2	3	4	5	6	7	R	H	E
Chinese Taipei	0	0	0	0	0	0	0	0	2	0
Australia	0	0	0	0	1	0	X	1	4	0
WP: Wu Chia-Yen (0-2) LP: Tanya Harding (2-0)

Team	1	2	3	4	5	6	7	R	H	E
Chinese Taipei	0	0	0	0	0	0	2	2	3	1
Greece	0	0	0	1	0	0	X	0	5	1
WP: Lai Sheng-Jung (1-0) LP: Sarah Farnworth (2-2)

Team	1	2	3	4	5	6	7	R	H	E
Italy	0	0	0	0	0	0	0	0	5	1
Chinese Taipei	0	0	0	1	0	0	X	1	4	0
WP: Lin Su-Hua (1-1) LP: Susan Bugliarello (0-2)

Team	1	2	3	4	5	6	7	R	H	E
Chinese Taipei	0	0	0	0	0	0	0	0	1	2
China	0	0	0	0	1	0	X	1	4	0
WP: Lü Wei(2–1) LP: Lai Sheng-Jung(1–1)

Team	1	2	3	4	5	6	7	R	H	E
Chinese Taipei	0	0	0	0	0	0	0	0	3	0
United States	0	0	1	1	1	1	X	3	8	1
WP: Cat Osterman(2–0) LP: Wu Chia-Yen(0–3)

== Swimming ==
Taiwanese swimmers earned qualifying standards in the following events (up to a maximum of 2 swimmers in each event at the A-standard time, and 1 at the B-standard time):

Men

Athlete	Event	Heat		Semifinal		Final	
Athlete	Event	Time	Rank	Time	Rank	Time	Rank
Chen Cho-yi	100 m breaststroke	1:03.94	35	Did not advance			
Chen Te-tung	200 m freestyle	1:54.14	47	Did not advance			
Chen Te-tung	400 m freestyle	4:03.71	40	—		Did not advance	
Lin Yu-an	400 m individual medley	4:41.76	35	—		Did not advance	
Wang Shao-an	50 m freestyle	23.54	48	Did not advance			
Wang Wei-wen	200 m breaststroke	2:20.65	42	Did not advance			
Wu Nien-pin	100 m freestyle	52.58	54	Did not advance			
Wu Nien-pin	200 m individual medley	2:08.72	44	Did not advance			
Yeh Tzu-cheng	200 m butterfly	2:06.41	36	Did not advance			

Women

Athlete	Event	Heat		Semifinal		Final	
Athlete	Event	Time	Rank	Time	Rank	Time	Rank
Cheng Wan-jung	100 m butterfly	1:02.94	34	Did not advance			
Cheng Wan-jung	200 m butterfly	2:16.25	25	Did not advance			
Fu Hsiao-han	100 m backstroke	1:06.62	37	Did not advance			
Lin Man-hsu	200 m backstroke	2:17.68	24	Did not advance			
Lin Man-hsu	200 m individual medley	2:18.86	20	Did not advance			
Lin Man-hsu	400 m individual medley	4:52.22	20	—		Did not advance	
Nieh Pin-chieh	50 m freestyle	27.09	=41	Did not advance			
Sung Yi-chieh	100 m freestyle	59.18	44	Did not advance			
Yang Chin-kuei	200 m freestyle	2:05.65	36	Did not advance			

== Table tennis ==
Four Taiwanese table tennis players qualified for the following events.

Athlete	Event	Round 1	Round 2	Round 3	Round 4	Quarterfinals	Semifinals	Final / BM	
Athlete	Event	Opposition Result	Opposition Result	Opposition Result	Opposition Result	Opposition Result	Opposition Result	Opposition Result	Rank
Chiang Peng-lung	Men's singles	Bye		Crişan (ROM); W 4–1	Ryu S-M (KOR); L 3–4	Did not advance			
Chuang Chih-yuan	Men's singles	Bye		Karlsson (SWE); W 4–2	Oh S-E (KOR); W 4–2	Wang H (CHN); L 2–4	Did not advance		
Chiang Peng-lung; Chuang Chih-yuan	Men's doubles	—	Bye	Hazinski / Lupulesku (USA); W 4–2	Błaszczyk / Krzeszewski (POL); L 2–4	Did not advance			
Huang I-hua	Women's singles	Boucetta (ALG); W 4–0	Tan Wl (ITA); L 2–4	Did not advance					
Huang I-hua; Lu Yun-feng	Women's doubles	Bye	Ben Kahia / Guenni (TUN); W 4–0	Logatzkaya / Pavlovich (BLR); W 4–3	Guo Y / Niu Jf (CHN); L 0–4	Did not advance			

== Taekwondo ==
Four Taiwanese taekwondo jin qualified for the following events.

Athlete	Event	Round of 16	Quarterfinals	Semifinals	Repechage 1	Repechage 2	Final / BM	
Athlete	Event	Opposition Result	Opposition Result	Opposition Result	Opposition Result	Opposition Result	Opposition Result	Rank
Chu Mu-yen	Men's −58 kg	Tlish (LBA); W RSC	Ramos (ESP); W 9–1	Bayoumi (EGY); W 5–4	Bye		Salazar (MEX); W 5–1	1st place, gold medalist(s)
Huang Chih-hsiung	Men's −68 kg	Hussein (EGY); W 8–1	Çalışkan (AUT); W 10–8	Sagastume (GUA); W 7–5	Bye		Saei (IRI); L 3–4	2nd place, silver medalist(s)
Chen Shih-hsin	Women's −49 kg	Baidya (NEP); W 4–0	Mora (COL); W 1–0	Gonda (CAN); W 3–2	Bye		Labrada (CUB); W 5–4	1st place, gold medalist(s)
Chi Shu-ju	Women's −57 kg	Essawy (EGY); W 8–0	Sukkhongdumnoen (THA); L 1–2	Did not advance				

== Tennis ==
Chinese Taipei nominated a male tennis player to compete in the tournament through a tripartite invitation.

Athlete	Event	Round of 64	Round of 32	Round of 16	Quarterfinals	Semifinals	Final / BM	
Athlete	Event	Opposition Score	Opposition Score	Opposition Score	Opposition Score	Opposition Score	Opposition Score	Rank
Lu Yen-hsun	Men's singles	Nieminen (FIN); L 3–6, 3–6	Did not advance					

== Weightlifting ==
Seven Taiwanese weightlifters qualified for the following events:

Men

Athlete	Event	Snatch		Clean & Jerk		Total	Rank
Athlete	Event	Result	Rank	Result	Rank	Total	Rank
Wang Shin-yuan	−56 kg	~~127.5~~	DNF	—	—	—	DNF
Yang Chin-yi	−56 kg	~~120~~	DNF	—	—	—	DNF
Yang Sheng-hsiung	−62 kg	120	=12	160	=4	280	9
Kuo Cheng-wei	−69 kg	132.5	13	165	=8	297.5	10

Women

Athlete	Event	Snatch		Clean & Jerk		Total	Rank
Athlete	Event	Result	Rank	Result	Rank	Total	Rank
Chen Han-tung	−48 kg	80	8	102.5	8	182.5	6
Chen Wei-ling	−48 kg	75	=12	95	=10	170	11
Huang Shih-hsu	−75 kg	~~112.5~~	DNF	—	—	—	DNF

== See also ==
- Chinese Taipei at the 2002 Asian Games
- Chinese Taipei at the 2004 Summer Paralympics
