= Vishwas (archer) =

Indian archer

Medal record

Men's archery

Representing India

Asian Games
| Bronze medal – third place | 2006 Doha | Team |

Asian Archery Championships
| Silver medal – second place | 2003 Yangon | Team |

Vishwas (also known as Viswash; born 11 December 1984 in Uttar Pradesh) is an Indian archer who won the bronze medal in the team competition at the 2006 Asian Games.

He was a team silver medallist at the 2003 Asian Archery Championships in 2003 alongside Satyadev Prasad, Tarundeep Rai and Majhi Sawaiyan. He is a three-time participant at the Archery World Cup, having competed in 2009, 2011 and 2014. He placed sixth at the Commonwealth Archery Championships in New Delhi in 2006.

Vishwas was the 2012 Indian champion in the men's 90 m event, the foremost national competition.
