= Wietse van Alten =

Dutch archer

Wietse Cornelis van Alten
Personal information
- Born: 24 September 1978 (age 47) Zaandam, Netherlands

Sport
- Sport: Archery
Medal record
Representing Netherlands
Summer Olympics
Bronze medal – third place	2000 Sydney	Individual

Wietse Cornelis van Alten (born 24 September 1978) is a retired archer from the Netherlands. Van Alten was born in Zaandam, in the municipality of Zaanstad. He has competed in archery since the age of seven.

Van Alten's first major international competition was the 1999 World Target Competition. He placed 8th there, earning a spot on the Olympic team.

In the 2000 Summer Olympics in Sydney, van Alten lost to Simon Fairweather of Australia in the semifinals, but rebounded with the highest score of the tournament for a 12-arrow match by scoring 114 in the bronze medal match to defeat Magnus Petersson of Sweden and win the bronze medal. The Netherlands team, of which he was a member, placed 9th in the men's team competition.

After suffering an elbow injury which required surgery in 2001, van Alten returned to success in competition in 2003 when he placed 6th in the World Target Competition held in New York, United States.

Van Alten competed at the 2004 Summer Olympics in men's individual archery, trying to defend his bronze medal. His score in the 72-arrow ranking round was 661, giving him a starting rank of 14th. He won his first match 152–151 against Ricardo Merlos of El Salvador, advancing to the round of 32. In the second round of elimination, he was defeated by Ilario Di Buò of Italy 164–160. His final rank was 27th overall.

Van Alten was also a member of the Netherlands' 5th-place men's archery team at the 2004 Summer Olympics, along with Pieter Custers and Ron van der Hoff. In summer 2004, he achieved the world number one ranking. After failing to qualify for the Beijing olympics in 2008, Van Alten retired. In 2013, he became the national coach of the Italian recurve team.
