= Apostolos Nanos =

Greek archer (born 1966)

Apostolos Nanos (Greek: Απόστολος Νάνος; born February 5, 1966) is an archer from Greece. He competed at the 2004 Summer Olympics in men's individual archery.

He was defeated in the first round of elimination, placing 57th overall.

Nanos was also a member of the 13th-place Greek men's archery team at the 2004 Summer Olympics.
