= Cherukuri =

Cherukuri (Telugu: చెరుకూరి) is a Telugu surname. Notable people with the surname include:

- Cherukuri Lenin (1985/1986–2010), Indian archer and coach
- Cherukuri Rajkumar (alias Azad; 1952–2010), Indian Communist Party militant
- Cherukuri Ramoji Rao (1936–2024), Indian businessman, media proprietor and film producer
