= Georgios Kalogiannidis =

Greek archer (born 1982)

Personal information
- Nationality: Greek
- Born: 21 November 1982 (age 42)

Sport
- Sport: Archery

Georgios Kalogiannidis (born 21 November 1982) is an archer from Greece. He competed at the 2004 Summer Olympics.

He was defeated in the first round of elimination, placing 54th overall.

Kalogiannidis was also a member of the 13th-place Greek men's archery team at the 2004 Summer Olympics.
