= Hsu Tzu-yi =

Taiwanese archer

Personal information
- Born: 24 November 1979 (age 46)
Medal record
Men's Archery
Representing Chinese Taipei
Asian Games
| Silver medal – second place | 2006 Doha | Team |

Hsu Tzu-yi (born 24 November 1979) is a Taiwanese professional archer representing Chinese Taipei. He competed in Archery at the 2006 Asian Games and won a silver medal with the men's team consisting of himself, Chen Szu-yuan, Kuo Cheng-wei, and Wang Cheng-pang.
