= Taumoepeau =

Taumoepeau is a Tongan surname that may refer to

- Afusipa Taumoepeau (born 1990), Australian rugby union player
- 'Alisi Afeaki Taumoepeau, Tongan politician
- Charlie Taumoepeau (born 1997), American football player
- Mia Taumoepeau, New Zealand based actress
- Sifa Taumoepeau (born 1961), Tongan archer
- Saimone Taumoepeau (born 1979), Tongan rugby union player
- Sonatane Tuʻa Taumoepeau-Tupou (1943–2013), Tongan diplomat
- Tevita Taumoepeau (born 1974), Tongan rugby union player
