= Erdem Zhigzhitov =

Buryat-Mongolian archer (05 October 1977)

Personal information
- Born: 5 October 1977 (age 48) Aginskoye, Zabaykalsky Krai, Russia
Medal record
Archery
Representing Russia
World Championships
Gold medal – first place	2005 Aalborg	18 m

Erdem Zhigzhitov (born 05 October 1977) was a Russian archer of Buryat-Mongolian ancestry.

== World Indoor Archery Championship results ==
2005 (as a Men's individual)

- At a qualification scored 587 points
- Defeated Berny Camps (Netherlands) 176-171
- Defeated Anton Prylepau (Belarus) 175-173
- Defeated Michael Peart (United Kingdom) 118-117
- Defeated Vic Wunderle (United States) 10-9 World Champion
