= Yehya Bundhun =

Mauritian archer (born 1965)

Personal information
- Nationality: Mauritian
- Born: January 25, 1965 (age 60)
- Height: 1.75 m (5 ft 9 in)
- Spouse: Jennifer Ah Leung Bundhun (2005-now)

Sport
- Country: Mauritius
- Sport: Archery
- Disability: parkinson
- Partner: jennifer ah leung bundhun

Yehya Bundhun (born 25 January 1965) is a sportsperson from Mauritius. He competes in archery, a sport he took up at the age of 25 . Prior to this he played volleyball, and his uncle Feizal Bundhun is a former national volleyball team coach.

At the 2004 Summer Olympics, Bundhun placed 64th in the men's individual ranking round with a 72-arrow score of 494. Because of this, he faced the top-ranked South Korean archer Im Dong-hyun in the first elimination round. Bundhun lost this match 152–109, but his score in this round was enough to place him 63rd in the final ranking.
