= Dmitry Nevmerzhitsky =

Russian archer (born 1975)

- Born: February 27, 1975; Russia
- Occupation: Athlete
- Known for: Placing 53rd overall in men's individual archery

Dmitry Vladimirovich Nevmerzhitsky (Russian: Дмитрий Владимирович Невмержицкий; born 27 February 1975) is an archer from Russia.

Nevmerzhitskiy competed at the 2004 Summer Olympics in men's individual archery. He was defeated in the first round of elimination, placing 53rd overall.
