= 2009 Asian Archery Championships =

International archery tournament

- Host city: Denpasar, Indonesia
- Dates: 16–21 November 2009

The 2009 Asian Archery Championships was the 16th edition of the event. It was held in Denpasar, Bali, Indonesia from 16 to 21 November 2009 and was organized by Asian Archery Federation.

== Medal summary ==
=== Recurve ===
Event	Gold	Silver	Bronze
Men's individual	Kuo Cheng-wei; Chinese Taipei	Xing Yu; China	Jayanta Talukdar; India
Men's team	South Korea; Kim Seong-hoon; Lee Chang-hwan; Lee Seung-yong	India; Rahul Banerjee; Mangal Singh Champia; Jayanta Talukdar	Chinese Taipei; Chen Szu-yuan; Kuo Cheng-wei; Wang Cheng-pang
Women's individual	Joo Hyun-jung; South Korea	Zhang Yunlu; China	Kim Yu-mi; South Korea
Women's team	Japan; Miki Kanie; Asako Matsunaga; Sayami Matsushita	South Korea; Joo Hyun-jung; Kim Mun-joung; Kim Yu-mi	China; Chen Yeqing; Ouyang Ruyu; Zhang Yunlu

=== Compound ===
Event	Gold	Silver	Bronze
Men's individual	Isaiah Rajendra Sanam; India	I Gusti Nyoman Puruhito; Indonesia	Majid Gheidi; Iran
Men's team	India; Ratan Singh Khuraijam; Srither Chinna Raju; Isaiah Rajendra Sanam	Iran; Mohammad Ali Karimi; Amir Kazempour; Reza Zamaninejad	Singapore; Adriel Chua; Vinson Heng; Michael Ong
Women's individual	Seok Ji-hyun; South Korea	Narisara Tinbua; Thailand	Manjudha Soy; India
Women's team	South Korea; Kwon Oh-hyang; Seo Jung-hee; Seok Ji-hyun	India; Jhano Hansdah; Manjudha Soy; Namita Yadav	Iran; Ensieh Haji Anzehaei; Vida Halimian; Leila Sakhaeifar

== Medal table ==
Rank	Nation	Gold	Silver	Bronze	Total
1	South Korea	4	1	1	6
2	India	2	2	2	6
3	Chinese Taipei	1	0	1	2
4	Japan	1	0	0	1
5	China	0	2	1	3
6	Iran	0	1	2	3
7	Indonesia	0	1	0	1
7	Thailand	0	1	0	1
9	Singapore	0	0	1	1
Totals (9 entries)		8	8	8	24
