= Majhi Sawaiyan =

Indian archer

Medal record

Men's recurve archery

Representing India

Asian Championships
Silver medal – second place	2005 New Delhi	Team

Majhi Sawaiyan (born 23 December 1981) is an athlete from India. He competes in archery.

Sawaiyan competed at the 2004 Summer Olympics in men's individual archery. Despite being ranked as number 22, he was defeated by Vic Wunderle (ranked 43rd) in the first round of elimination, placing 59th overall. Wunderle is a bronze medallist of the 2000 Olympics.

Later during the Athens games, Sawaiyan was a member of the 11th-place Indian men's archery team.
