= John Magera =

American archer (born 1970)

John Elliott Magera (born February 6, 1970) is an athlete from the United States, who competes in archery.

Magera was born in Houston, Texas.

He was a member of the 2004 Summer Olympics 4th-place American men's archery team, which lost the bronze medal to Ukraine by two points. He also competed in men's individual archery, where he was defeated by Wang Cheng-pang with 144-159 in the first round of elimination, placing 39th overall.

In August 2006, Magera was selected as one of four original coaches for the "Junior Dream Team" - a developmental program for teenage archers that train at the Olympic training center.

Magera served as the Asst. head coach for the U.S. team during the 2007 Grand Prix event held in Antalya, Turkey.

At the U.S. Olympic Team Trials, First Nomination Shoot, September 28 – October 1, 2011 at College Station, Texas John Magera qualified as part of the men’s Shadow Team for the US Olympic Team Trials.

After 144 arrows, the top 16 men include Ellison, Kaminski, Wukie, Thomas Stanwood, Butch Johnson, Joe Fanchin, Peter Kelchner, Staten Holmes, Michael Quayle, John Magera, Vic Wunderle, Dan Schuller, Daniel McLaughlin, Matthew Zumbo, Jeff Anderson and Joe McGlyn.

At the U.S. Olympic Team Trials, Second Nomination Shoot, April 23–28, 2012, Magera finished 11th among the 16 competitors.
