= Isaiah Rajendra Sanam =

Indian archer

Medal record

Men's compound archery

Representing India

Asian Championships
Gold medal – first place	2009 Denpasar	Individual
Gold medal – first place	2009 Denpasar	Team

Isaiah Rajendra Sanam (born 1977) is an Indian archer from Hyderabad. He became the first Indian to win an Asian Championship gold medal in men's category. He won the gold at the 16th Asian Archery Championships in compound bow section at Bali, Indonesia. He beat local archer Nyoman Puruhito.

== Early life ==
He started shooting with a bow for fun but later joined and took up archery as a sport at the Andhra Sports School in Hyderabad.

== Career ==
In 2009, he won the gold at the Asian Championship in men's Compound bow category and was also part of the Indian team that won the men's Compound team event. Later, he missed the Indian team for the Commonwealth Games as the Federation opted for youth.
