= 2005 Asian Archery Championships =

International archery tournament

- Host city: New Delhi, India
- Dates: 4–10 November 2005

The 2005 Asian Archery Championships was the 14th edition of the event. It was held at the Jawaharlal Nehru Stadium in New Delhi, India from 4 to 10 November 2005 and was organized by Asian Archery Federation.

== Medal summary ==
=== Recurve ===
Event	Gold	Silver	Bronze
Men's individual	Im Dong-hyun; South Korea	Kim Bo-ram; South Korea	Park Kyung-mo; South Korea
Men's team	South Korea; Han Seung-hoon; Im Dong-hyun; Kim Bo-ram; Park Kyung-mo	India; Rahul Banerjee; Tarundeep Rai; Majhi Sawaiyan; Jayanta Talukdar	Chinese Taipei; Chen Szu-yuan; Kuo Cheng-wei; Lu Chien-yu; Sung Chia-chun
Women's individual	Park Sung-hyun; South Korea	Yun Ok-hee; South Korea	Yun Mi-jin; South Korea
Women's team	China; Qian Jialing; Zhang Juanjuan; Zhang Nina	South Korea; Lee Sung-jin; Park Sung-hyun; Yun Mi-jin; Yun Ok-hee	India; Dola Banerjee; Reena Kumari; Laxmirani Majhi; Chekrovolu Swuro

=== Compound ===
Event	Gold	Silver	Bronze
Men's individual	Cai Shuo; China	Reza Zamaninejad; Iran	Vivek Kumar; India
Men's team	India; Naresh Damor; Vivek Kumar; Cherukuri Lenin; Shivnath Nagesia	China; Cai Shuo; Cheng Qing; Liu Xiaoguang; Tian Shuqiang	Thailand; Jitti Kaenthonglang; Piyapong Leenapongpanich; Arkhom Pannoi
Women's individual	Jhano Hansdah; India	Sakro Besra; India	Bansaralin Dhar; India

== Medal table ==
Rank	Nation	Gold	Silver	Bronze	Total
1	South Korea	3	3	2	8
2	India	2	2	3	7
3	China	2	1	0	3
4	Iran	0	1	0	1
5	Chinese Taipei	0	0	1	1
5	Thailand	0	0	1	1
Totals (6 entries)		7	7	7	21
