= Ismail Essam =

Egyptian archer (born 1967)

Essam Ismail (born 5 August 1967) is an athlete and professor from Egypt. He competes in archery.

Essam competed at the 2000 and 2004 Summer Olympics in men's individual archery. He was defeated in the first round of elimination on both occasions, placing 56th overall in 2000 and 62nd in 2004.
