= Wang Shiao-ping =

Taiwanese softball player

Personal information
- Nationality: Taiwanese
- Born: 22 June 1981 (age 43)

Sport
- Sport: Softball

Wang Shiao-ping (born 22 June 1981) is a Taiwanese softball player. She competed in the women's tournament at the 2004 Summer Olympics.
