= Choi Won-jong =

South Korean archer (born 1978)

Choi Won-jong (Korean: 최원종; born January 13, 1978) is a South Korean archer. At the 2005 Korean National Sports Festival in Ulsan, Choi set a world record by shooting a perfect score of 120 (twelve consecutive shots in the bullseye) in the semifinals of the club-division archery individual competition.

== See also ==
- Korean archery
- Archery
- List of South Korean archers
