= Thomas Naglieri =

French archer (born 1985)

Thomas Naglieri (born 14 September 1985) is an athlete from France. He competes in archery.

Naglieri competed at the 2004 Summer Olympics in men's individual archery. He was defeated in the first round of elimination, placing 60th overall. Naglieri was also a member of the 10th-place French men's archery team at the 2004 Summer Olympics.

On the 15th of August 2020, Naglieri declared his candidacy for President of the Fédération Française de Tir à l'Arc (FFTA).
