= Sifa Taumoepeau =

Tongan archer (born 1961)

Personal information
- Born: June 8, 1961 (age 64)
- Height: 1.7 m (5 ft 7 in)
- Weight: 80 kg (176 lb)

Sport
- Country: Tonga
- Sport: Archery
- Event: Men's individual

SioSifa Taumoepeau (born 8 June 1961) is an athlete from Tonga. He competes in archery.

Taumoepeau competed at the 2004 Summer Olympics in men's individual archery. He was defeated in the first round of elimination, placing 61st overall.
