= Archery at the 2004 Summer Olympics =

Archery at the Games of the XXVIII Olympiad
- Venue: Panathinaiko Stadium
- Dates: 15–21 August 2004
- No. of events: 4 (2 men, 2 women)
- Competitors: 128 from 43 nations

Archery at the 2004 Summer Olympics was held at Panathinaiko Stadium in Athens, Greece with ranking rounds on 12 August and regular competition held from 15 August to 21 August. One hundred twenty-eight archers from forty-three nations competed in the four gold medal events—individual and team events for men and for women—that were contested at these games.

The stadium, often called Kallimarmaro, is notable as the site of the first Olympic Games and even earlier, where the Ancient Greeks' Panathenean Games were hosted. At the behest of James Easton, president of the International Archery Federation, archery events were held in the historic stadium, hoping that its history and natural beauty would attract the public to the sport. Laurence Godfrey, the fourth-place finisher in the men's individual event, remarked that the stadium inspired pride, while American Vic Wunderle spoke for most of the archers in saying, "It's a great honor and a privilege to be able to compete inside the 1896 Olympic Stadium."

The Korean team won three out of the four gold medals contested. Four Olympic records and several other world records were broken at these games, despite poor weather conditions during the preliminary rounds of competition.

== Qualification and format ==
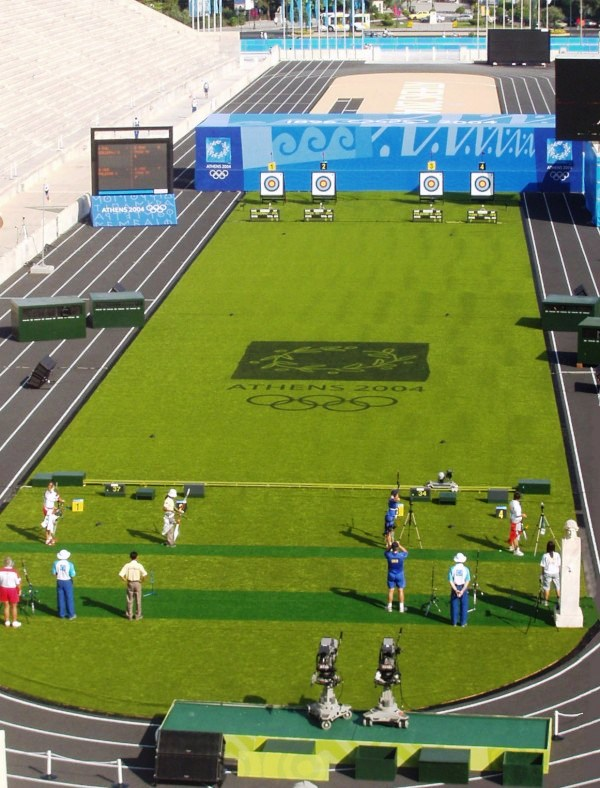
Matches in progress during the women's round of 64 at Panathinaiko Stadium

There were four ways for National Olympic Committees (NOCs) to qualify individual archers for the Olympics in archery. For each gender, the host nation (Greece) was guaranteed three spots. The 2003 World Target Competition's top 8 teams (not including the host nation) each received three spots, and the 19 highest ranked archers after the team qualifiers were removed also received spots. Fifteen of the remaining eighteen spots were divided equally among the five Olympic continents for allocation in continental tournaments. The last three spots in each gender were determined by the Tripartite Commission. Sixty-four archers of each sex took part in the Olympics, with each NOC being able to enter a maximum of three archers.

For all archery events at the Olympics, archers stand 70 metres from their target. The target consists of concentric circles, and has a total diameter of 122 cm. Archers earn points based on which circle their arrow landed in, with ten points awarded for hitting the center circle, and one point awarded for hitting the outermost circle. During the ranking rounds, each archer shot twelve ends, or groups, of six arrows per end. The score from that round determined the match-ups in the elimination rounds, with high-ranking archers facing low-ranking archers. The first three rounds of elimination used six ends of three arrows, narrowing the field of archers from 64 to 8. The three final rounds (quarterfinals, semifinals, and medal matches) each used four ends of three arrows.

Thirteen men's and fifteen women's teams competed in the team competitions. The teams consisted of the country's three archers from the individual round, and the team's initial ranking was determined by summing the three members' scores in the individual ranking round. Each round of eliminations consisted of each team shooting 27 arrows (9 by each archer).

== Medal summary ==
Event	Gold	Silver	Bronze
Men's individual	Marco Galiazzo; Italy	Hiroshi Yamamoto; Japan	Tim Cuddihy; Australia
Men's team	South Korea; Im Dong-Hyun; Jang Yong-Ho; Park Kyung-Mo	Chinese Taipei; Chen Szu-yuan; Liu Ming-huang; Wang Cheng-pang	Ukraine; Dmytro Hrachov; Viktor Ruban; Oleksandr Serdyuk
Women's individual	Park Sung-hyun; South Korea	Lee Sung-Jin; South Korea	Alison Williamson; Great Britain
Women's team	South Korea; Lee Sung-Jin; Park Sung-hyun; Yun Mi-Jin	China; He Ying; Lin Sang; Zhang Juanjuan	Chinese Taipei; Chen Li-Ju; Wu Hui-ju; Yuan Shu-chi

== Event summary ==
For the sixth Olympics in a row, the South Korean team came out as the clear victor, taking three out of the four gold medals in Athens. Korean archers set new world records in the women's individual (Park Sung-hyun) and team (Park, Yun Mi-Jin, and Lee Sung-Jin) ranking rounds and the men's individual ranking round (Im Dong Hyun), though none of those scores counted as Olympic records because the ranking round was held before the opening ceremony. Olympic records were broken in both the men's and women's 36-arrow 1/16 and 1/8 rounds combined (by Chen Szu Yuan of Chinese Taipei and Yun of Korea), as well as in the men's 18-arrow match (by Park Kyung Mo of Korea) and 36-arrow finals rounds combined (by Tim Cuddihy of Australia).

This historic stadium has given me strength, because it is a great feeling to see the Acropolis next to you.

— Wietse van Alten

In the men's events, the Korean team shot 12 maximum scores of 10 to win the gold medal against Chinese Taipei 251–245. Losing by two points, the United States failed to fend off the Ukraine team to capture the bronze. The event causing the most upset however was the men's individual, the only event that the Korean team has never won and yet again failed to clinch. Defending champion Simon Fairweather was ousted from the competition in a first round loss due to blustery weather conditions. The wind caused some archers like Fairweather to make one-point shots, and its strength even caused others to miss their targets completely. The final matches of this event also saw competitors coming close in score, with Italian Marco Galiazzo beating the Japanese Hiroshi Yamamoto by only two points to win gold. Even closer still was the bronze medal match, in which Britain's Laurence Godfrey was outshot 112–113 by seventeen-year-old Australian Tim Cuddihy, who himself only managed to get into the semifinals by one point.

The woman's individual event fell easily to the Koreans; they have won this event continuously since the 1984 Summer Olympics in Los Angeles and swept all three medals at the 2000 Olympics. Though both gold and silver fell to Korean archers, Alison Williamson captured the bronze medal, giving Britain its first medal in archery since 1992. In the team event, the Korean women beat the Chinese team 241–240 to win the gold medal, making this their eleventh straight women's team championship win. Chinese Taipei easily took the bronze medal over France.

== Participating nations ==
Forty-three nations contributed archers to compete in the events. Below is a list of the competing nations; in parentheses are the number of national competitors.

- Australia (6)
- Belarus (2)
- Bhutan (2)
- Bulgaria (1)
- Canada (2)
- China (5)
- Chinese Taipei (6)
- Cuba (1)
- Denmark (1)
- Egypt (4)
- El Salvador (1)
- Fiji (1)
- Finland (1)
- France (6)
- Georgia (2)
- Germany (4)
- Great Britain (4)
- Greece (6)
- India (6)
- Indonesia (2)
- Italy (4)
- Japan (6)
- Kazakhstan (3)
- South Korea (6)
- Laos (1)
- Luxembourg (1)
- Malaysia (1)
- Mauritius (1)
- Mexico (3)
- Myanmar (1)
- Netherlands (3)
- New Zealand (1)
- Philippines (1)
- Poland (4)
- Russia (5)
- South Africa (1)
- Spain (2)
- Sweden (3)
- Tajikistan (1)
- Tonga (1)
- Turkey (4)
- Ukraine (6)
- United States (6)

== Medal table ==
Korea continued its domination of the sport, winning three of the four gold medals as well as a silver. Marco Galiazzo won the men's individual competition, earning Italy the nation's first gold medal in Olympic archery, blocking Hiroshi Yamamoto's attempt to win Japan's first gold medal. Chinese Taipei, which had never before won a medal in archery, won a silver and a bronze.

Rank	Nation	Gold	Silver	Bronze	Total
1	South Korea	3	1	0	4
2	Italy	1	0	0	1
3	Chinese Taipei	0	1	1	2
4	China	0	1	0	1
4	Japan	0	1	0	1
6	Australia	0	0	1	1
6	Great Britain	0	0	1	1
6	Ukraine	0	0	1	1
Totals (8 entries)		4	4	4	12
