= Satyadev Prasad =

Indian archer

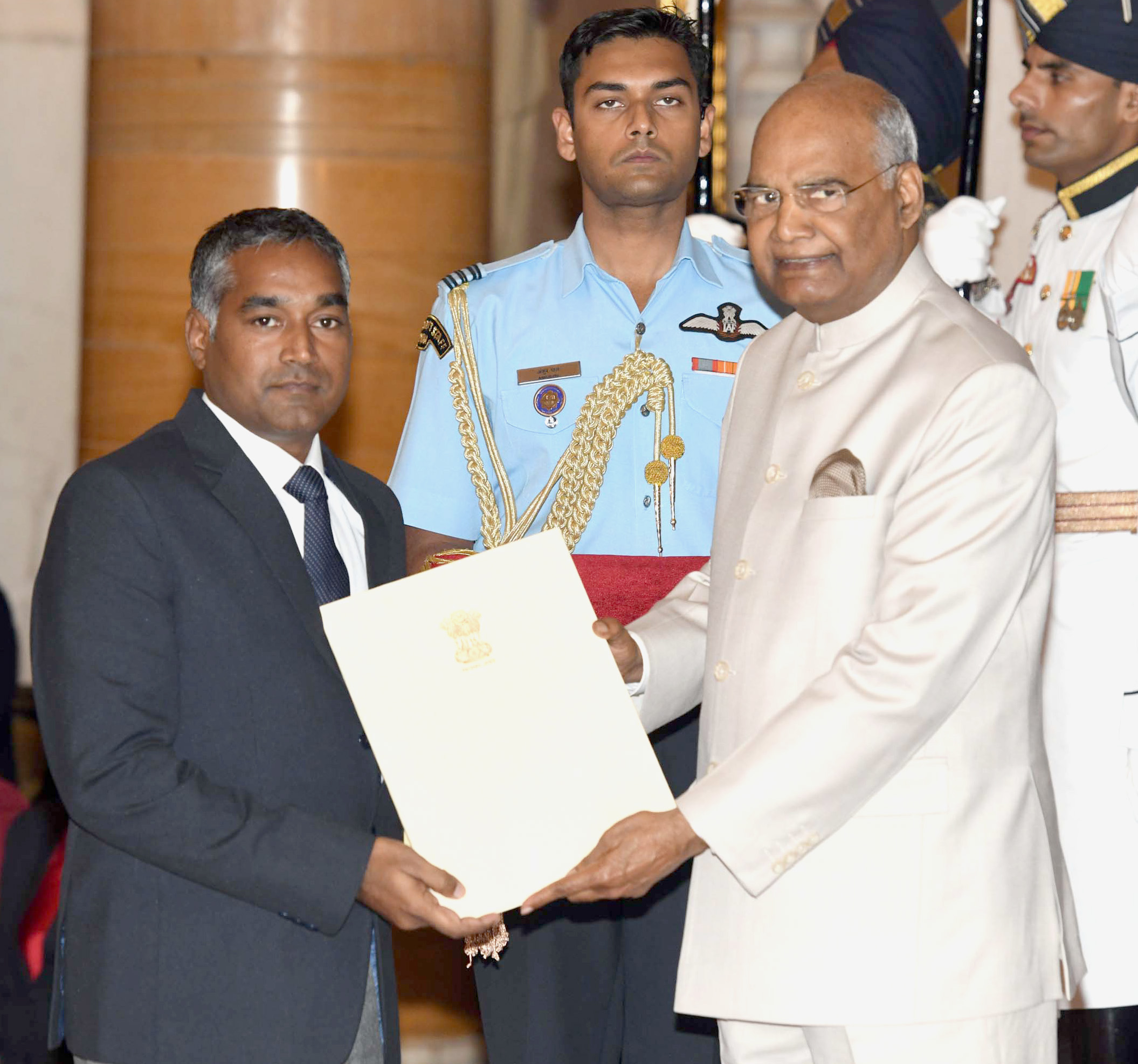
Satyadev Prasad receiving the Dhyan Chand Award in 2018 from the President Ram Nath Kovind.

Satyadev Prasad (born 19 September 1979) is an athlete from India. He competes in archery.

Prasad competed at the 2004 Summer Olympics in men's individual archery. He won his first match, advancing to the round of 32. In the second round of elimination, he was again victorious and advanced to the round of 16. The third match was Prasad's downfall, as he lost to 1st-ranked Im Dong-hyun of South Korea in a thrilling match that went down to the last round. Prasad placed 10th overall. Prasad got 2018-Dyanchand award in the Archery and he will receive the award on 25 September 2018.

Prasad was also a member of the 11th-place Indian men's archery team at the 2004 Summer Olympics. He won bronze medal in the Asian Team Championship held in Malaysia. Participated in the Rome World Championship 1999, Beijing World Championship 2001 and New York World Championship 2003. He has completed his graduation (B.P.Ed.) and Post-Graduation (M.P.Ed.) from Noida College of Physical Education, Dadri.

== Personal life ==
Satyadev Prasad was born in Nizamabad, Azamgarh, Uttar Pradesh, India. He began playing the game of Archery at quite an early age. Inspired by the success of Limba Ram, the celebrated Archer, he strived hard to rise in the sport.
