= Butch Johnson =

American archer (1955–2024)

Personal information
- Full name: Richard Andrew Johnson
- Born: August 30, 1955 Worcester, Massachusetts, U.S.
- Died: May 27, 2024 (aged 68) Woodstock, Connecticut, U.S.
- Height: 6 ft 3 in (191 cm)
- Weight: 216 lb (98 kg)
Medal record
Men's archery
Representing the United States
Olympic Games
| Gold medal – first place | 1996 Atlanta | Team |
| Bronze medal – third place | 2000 Sydney | Team |
Pan American Games
| Gold medal – first place | 1999 Winnipeg | Team |
| Gold medal – first place | 2007 Rio de Janeiro | Team |
| Silver medal – second place | 1995 Mar del Plata | Individual (70 m) |
| Bronze medal – third place | 1995 Mar del Plata | Individual |
World Championships
| Bronze medal – third place | 1999 Riom | Team (recurve) |

Richard Andrew "Butch" Johnson (August 30, 1955 – May 27, 2024) was an American archer. He competed in the Summer Olympics five times, and was a part of the gold medal U.S. team at the 1996 Olympics and the bronze medal U.S. team in the 2000 Olympics.

== 2004 Summer Olympics ==
At the 2004 Olympics, he was surprisingly eliminated by Ron van der Hoff with 135–145 in the round of 64, placing 52nd overall in men's individual archery. He later placed 4th as a member of the United States team.

== 2008 Summer Olympics ==
At the 2008 Summer Olympics in Beijing Johnson finished his ranking round with a total of 653 points. This gave him the 40th seed for the final competition bracket in which he faced Andrey Abramov in the first round. Both scored 109 points in the regular match and they had to go to an extra round. In this extra round Abramov scored 25 points, while Johnson advanced to the second round with 26 points. There he faced eight seeded Im Dong-Hyun, who was too strong with 115–106.

Together with Brady Ellison and Vic Wunderle he also took part in the team event. With his 653 score from the ranking round combined with the 664 of Ellison and the 652 of Wunderle the Americans were in 10th position after the ranking round. In the first round they were not able to win against Chinese Taipei that won the confrontation by 222–218.

== After the Olympics ==
Johnson maintained himself as one of the best recurve shooters in the country, having ranked in the top five in the United States and placed sixth in the 2012 U.S. Olympic Team Trials. Amid speculation that he would retire following the Trials, Johnson came back to finish second in the 2012 National Target Championships and won a silver medal in the 2012 Hoyt World Open, second only to number one world ranked archer Brady Ellison.

== Personal life ==
Johnson was married to Teresa and had one child. He died in Woodstock, Connecticut on 27 May 2024, at the age of 68, after several years of living with chronic lymphocytic leukemia.
