= Michael Frankenberg =

German archer (born 1978)

Michael Frankenberg (born 13 January 1978) is an athlete from Germany, who competes in archery.

Frankenberg competed at the 2004 Summer Olympics in men's individual archery. He won his first match, advancing to the round of 32. In the second round of elimination, he was defeated. His final overall rank was 21st.}
