= Kuo Cheng-wei =

Taiwanese archer (born 1983)

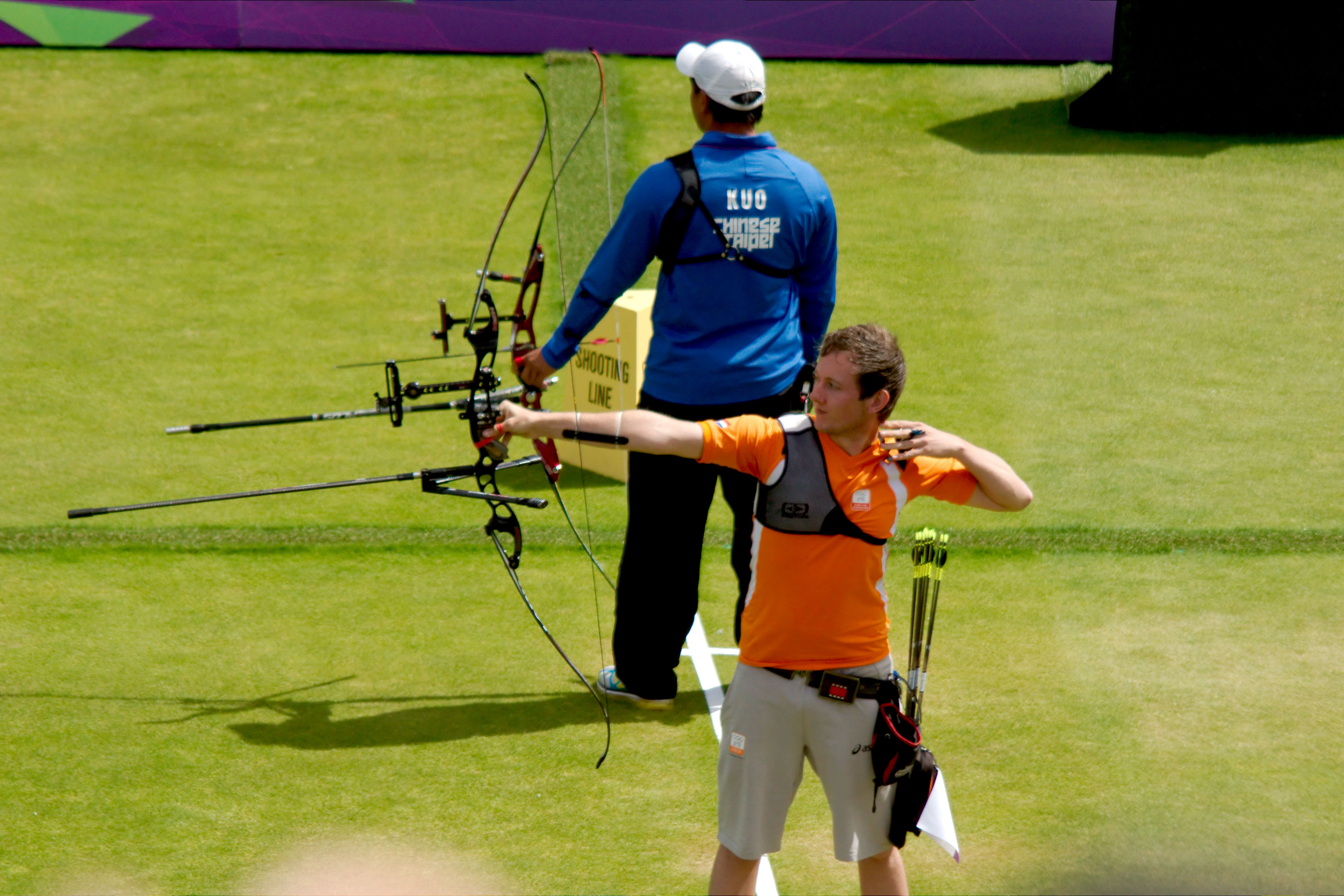
- Rick van der Ven and Kuo at the 2012 Summer Olympics

Personal information
- Born: 9 November 1983 (age 42) Taoyuan, Taiwan, Chinese Taipei
- Height: 176 cm (5 ft 9 in)
- Weight: 92 kg (203 lb)
Medal record
Men's recurve archery
Representing Chinese Taipei
World Championships
Silver medal – second place	2015 Copenhagen	Mixed team
Bronze medal – third place	2013 Belek	Mixed team
Bronze medal – third place	2015 Copenhagen	Men's team
Asian Games
Silver medal – second place	2006 Doha	Team
Bronze medal – third place	2006 Doha	Individual
Bronze medal – third place	2014 Incheon	Individual
Asian Championships
Gold medal – first place	2009 Denpasar	Individual
Bronze medal – third place	2005 New Delhi	Team
Bronze medal – third place	2009 Denpasar	Team
Bronze medal – third place	2013 Taipei	Team
Bronze medal – third place	2013 Taipei	Mixed team
Summer Universiade
Gold medal – first place	2005 Izmir	Individual
Silver medal – second place	2009 Belgrade	Team

Kuo Cheng-wei (Chinese: 郭振維; pinyin: Guō Zhèngwéi; born 9 November 1983) is a Taiwanese professional archer representing Chinese Taipei. He competed in Archery at the 2006 Asian Games and won a silver medal with the men's team consisting of himself, Chen Szu-yuan, Hsu Tzu-yi and Wang Cheng-pang

== 2008 Summer Olympics ==
At the 2008 Summer Olympics in Beijing Kuo finished his ranking round with a total of 659 points. This gave him the 29th seed for the final competition bracket in which he faced Mark Javier in the first round, beating the Philippine 106–102. In the second round Kuo was eliminated by Park Kyung-Mo with just one point (111-110). Park would eventually win the silver medal.

Together with Chen Szu-Yuan and Wang Cheng-Pang he also took part in the team event. With his 659 score from the ranking round combined with the 654 of Chen and the 667 of Wang they were in seventh position after the ranking round. In the first round they were too strong for the American team 222–218, but in the quarter-final they were unable to beat the Ukrainian team 214–211.
