= Ken Uprichard =

New Zealand archer (born 1980)

Kenneth ("Ken") Philip Uprichard (born 13 May 1980) is an athlete from New Zealand, who competes in archery.

Uprichard competed at the 2000 Summer Olympics and the 2004 Summer Olympics in men's individual archery. In 2000 he placed 48th, and in 2004 he was defeated in the first round of elimination, placing 40th overall.
