= Yavor Hristov =

Bulgarian archer (born 1976)

Yavor Hristov (Bulgarian: Явор Христов; born 25 March 1976 in Ruse) is an athlete from Bulgaria. He competes in archery.

Hristov competed in the men's individual archery event at the 2004 Summer Olympics. He won his first match, advancing to the round of 32. In the second round he was defeated by Taiwanese's Chen Szu-yuan. His final rank was 28th overall.

He also competed in the same event at the 2012 Summer Olympics. He lost in the first round to Luis Alvarez of Mexico.
