= Tu Chang-wei =

Taiwanese baseball player

- Pitcher
- Born: May 11, 1982 (age 43)
- Bats: Right Throws: Right

CPBL statistics
- Win–loss record: 12–23
- Earned run average: 3.84
- Strikeouts: 198
- Stats at Baseball Reference

Teams
- Chinatrust Whales (2005–2008)

Career highlights and awards
- National Baseball Congress World Series MVP (2003)

Tu Chang-wei (born May 11, 1982) is a Taiwanese baseball player who competed in the 2004 Summer Olympics.

Tu pitched a complete game one-hit shutout against the Santa Barbara Foresters in the finals of the 2003 National Baseball Congress World Series. He faced only 28 batters and retired 27 of them. He won the tournament's most valuable player award, the first pitcher to do so in fifteen years.
