= Jonathan Ohayon =

Canadian archer (born 1972)

Jonathan Liss Ohayon (born January 10, 1972, in Toronto, Ontario) is an athlete from Canada, a glass artist, works in the IT field, and is the grandson of writer Joseph Liss. He competes in archery.

Ohayon competed all around the world in archery, was ranked top 30 in the world, won double gold at the Pan American Championships (Individual and Team), and competed at the 2004 Summer Olympics in men's individual archery.
