= Chang Li-chiu =

Taiwanese softball player

Personal information
- Nationality: Taiwanese
- Born: 29 February 1980 (age 45)

Sport
- Sport: Softball

Chang Li-chiu (born 29 February 1980) is a Taiwanese softball player. She competed in the women's tournament at the 2004 Summer Olympics.
