= Cherukuri Lenin =

Indian archer and coach

Medal record

Men's compound archery

Representing India

Asian Championships
Gold medal – first place	2005 New Delhi	Team

Cherukuri Lenin (1985 or 1986 – 24 October 2010) was an Indian archer and coach. He was the son of Cherukuri Satyanarayana.

In 2005, he won a silver medal at the Asian Grand Prix in Malaysia.

He was a National Archery Coach under Limba Ram. His students Ritul Chatterjee and Chittibomma Jignas won silver medals in the Archery compound team event at the 2010 Commonwealth Games at New Delhi.

He died at the age of 26 in a road collision near Ibrahimpatnam on 24 October 2010.
