= Ron van der Hoff =

Dutch archer (born 1978)

Personal information
- Full name: Ron Luitjen Lucia van der Hoff
- Born: 26 March 1978 (age 48) Venray, Netherlands
- Height: 191 cm (6 ft 3 in)
- Weight: 83 kg (183 lb)
Medal record
Men's recurve archery
Representing Netherlands
European Championships
| Gold medal – first place | 2004 Bruxelles | Team |
| Silver medal – second place | 2002 Oulu | Team |
| Bronze medal – third place | 2008 Vittel | Team |

Ron Luitjen Lucia van der Hoff (born 26 March 1978 in Venray, Limburg) is an athlete from the Netherlands, who competes in archery.

Van der Hoff competed in archery at the 2004 Summer Olympics. In men's individual archery, he won his first match, upsetting Butch Johnson of the US. Advancing to the round of 32, he was defeated in the second round of elimination. His final rank was 30th overall.

Van der Hoff was also a member of the Netherlands' 5th-place men's archery team at the 2004 Summer Olympics. This team had placed 6th at the 2003 World Championship.
