= Tarundeep Rai =

Indian archer

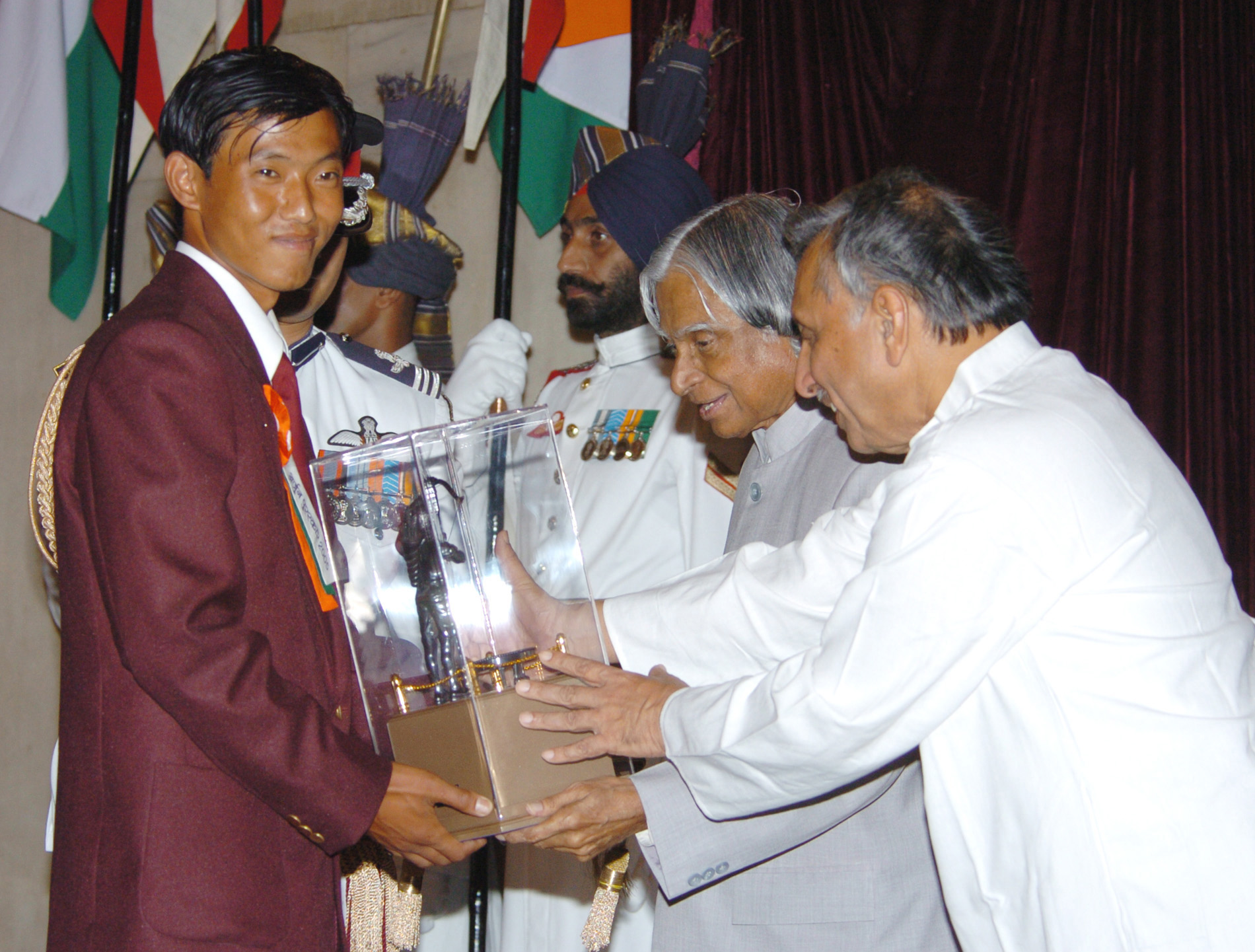

Personal information
- Nationality: Indian
- Born: 22 February 1984 (age 42) Namchi, Sikkim, India
- Occupation: Archery
Medal record
Men's archery
Representing India
Event	1st	2nd	3rd
World Championships	0	2	0
World Cups	3	7	0
Asian Games	0	1	1
Asian Archery Championships	0	2	1
Asia Cup	1	1	0
Commonwealth Games	0	0	1
South Asian Federation Games	5	1	0
Total	9	14	3
World Championships
Silver medal – second place	2005 Madrid	Men's Team
Silver medal – second place	2019 's-Hertogenbosch	Men's Team
World Cup
Gold medal – first place	2010 Shanghai	Men's Team
Gold medal – first place	2022 Antalya	Mixed Team
Gold medal – first place	2024 Shanghai	Men's Team
Silver medal – second place	2010 Porec	Men's Team
Silver medal – second place	2011 Porec	Men's Team
Silver medal – second place	2012 Antalya	Men's Team
Silver medal – second place	2012 Odgen	Men's Team
Silver medal – second place	2014 Wroclaw	Men's Team
Silver medal – second place	2023 Antalya	Men's Team
Silver medal – second place	2025 Central Florida	Men's Team
Asian Games
Silver medal – second place	2010 Guangzhou	Individual
Bronze medal – third place	2006 Doha	Team
Asian Archery Championships
Silver medal – second place	2003 Yangon	Recurve Team
Silver medal – second place	2005 New Delhi	Recurve Team
Bronze medal – third place	2019 Bangkok	Recurve Team
Asia Cup
Gold medal – first place	2024 Baghdad	Men's Team
Silver medal – second place	2024 Baghdad	Individual
Commonwealth Games
Bronze medal – third place	2010 New Delhi	Recurve Team
South Asian Federation Games
Gold medal – first place	2006 Colombo	Men's Team
Gold medal – first place	2010 Dhaka	Individual
Gold medal – first place	2016 Shillong	Men's Team
Gold medal – first place	2016 Shillong	Mixed Team
Gold medal – first place	2016 Shillong	Individual
Silver medal – second place	2006 Colombo	Individual

Tarundeep Rai (born 22 February 1984) is an Indian archer from Sikkim. He was awarded the Padma Shri in 2021 by the Government of India for his contribution to sports. He is a three time Olympian.

== Early life ==
Rai was born in Namchi, Sikkim, India. He is supported by a sports NGO, Olympic Gold Quest.

== Career ==
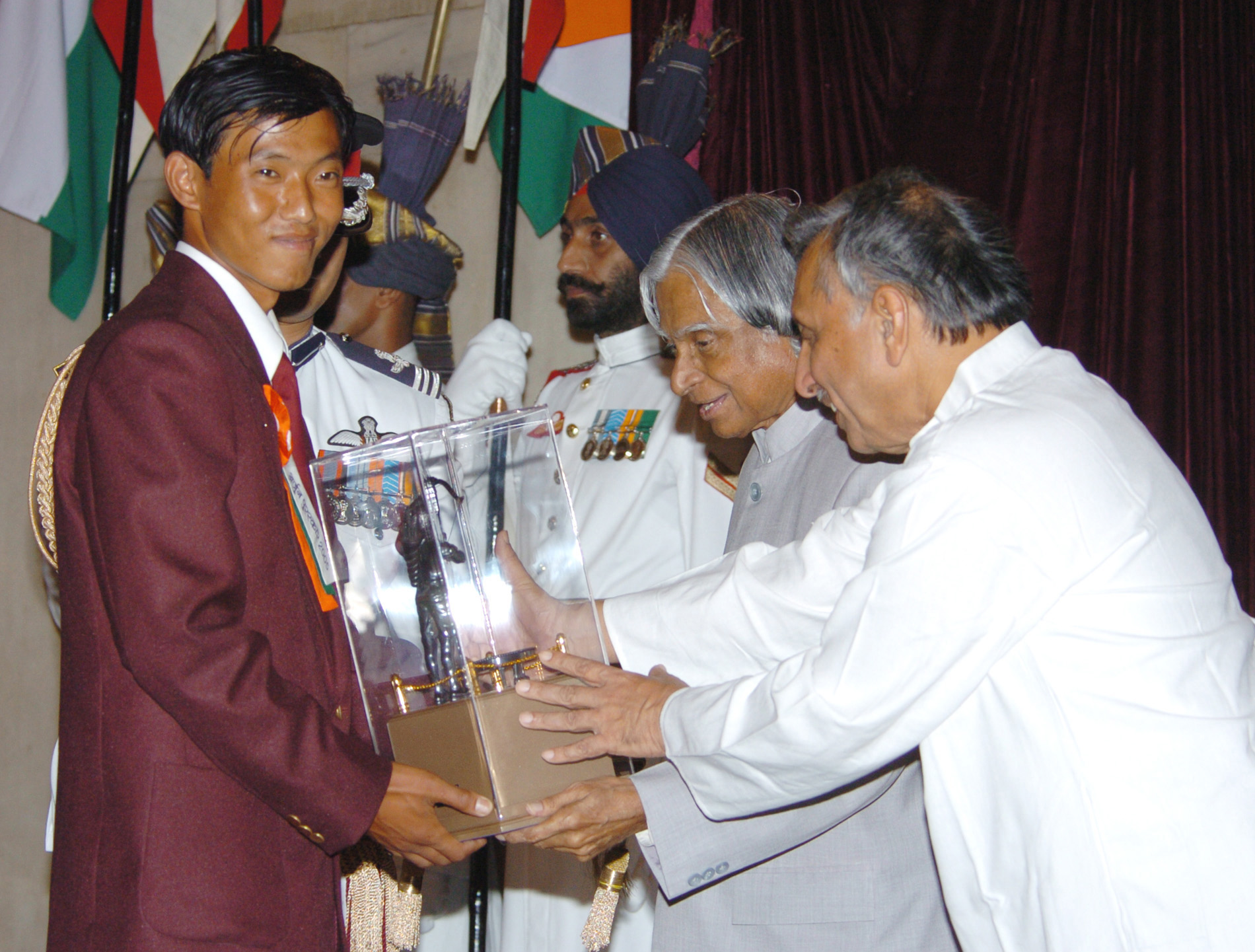
The President Dr. A.P.J. Abdul Kalam presenting the Arjuna Award -2005 to Shri Tarundeep Rai for Archery, at a glittering function in New Delhi on 29 August 2006

Rai made his international debut in 2003 at the age of 19 years at the Asian Archery Championship 2003 held at Yangon, Myanmar. He won India's maiden individual silver medal at the 16th Asian Games on 24 November 2010 in Guangzhou, China.

Earlier, he was also a member of the Indian team that won a bronze medal at the 15th Asian Games in Doha in 2006.

He became an Olympian taking part in the 2004 Summer Olympics, where he was placed 32nd in the men's individual ranking round with a 72-arrow score of 647. He faced Alexandros Karageorgiou of Greece in the first elimination round and lost 147–143. His final rank was 43. He was also a member of the Indian men's archery team that was place 11th at the 2004 Olympics.

=== Injury ===
He was out of action for two years in 2007 and 2008 due to a career-threatening shoulder injury. He won a silver medal at the 2010 Guangzhou Asian Games in the individual event.

=== London Olympics ===
Rai was part of Indian men's recurve team at the 2012 London Olympics. after India took third place in the qualification round at Ogden, US in 2012.

He was a part of the Indian archery team that finished 4th at the 2003 World Championship in New York City. His was also part of the Indian team that won silver medal at the 2005 World Championship in Madrid, Spain. He also became the first Indian to make it to the semifinal round of the World Archery Championship in 2005 where he narrowly lost to Won Jong Choi of South Korea by 106-112 for the bronze medal play-off.

He won three gold medals at South Asian Games in Guwahati and Shillong.

=== Tokyo Olympics ===
Rai along with Atanu Das and Praveen Jadhav won a quota place and took part in Tokyo Olympics. Due to lockdown, he trained at ASI campus. He reduced 14 kg in six months. He was part of the Indian team that defeated Kazakhstan in round of 16 in the men's team event. Later, they lost to Republic of Korea in the quarterfinals. In the individual event, he defeated Oleksii Hunbin of Ukraine 6–4 in the 1st round but lost to Itay Shanny of Israel in Round 2 in a one arrow shoot-off.

=== Paris Olympics ===
Rai was selected to take part in the 2024 Summer Olympic Games at Paris in both individual and team events. He lost to Tom Hall of England in 1/32 eliminations in the individual match.

== Awards ==
- He received Arjuna Award in 2005.
- He received Padma Shri in 2020.
- In October 2023, ICFAI University in Sikkim conferred the Degree of Doctor of Philosophy in recognition of his efforts in archery.
