= 2003 Asian Archery Championships =

International archery tournament

- Host city: Yangon, Myanmar
- Dates: 4–9 November 2003

The 2003 Asian Archery Championships was the 13th edition of the event. It was held in Yangon, Myanmar from 4 to 9 November 2003 and was organized by Asian Archery Federation.

== Medal summary ==
=== Recurve ===
| Event | Gold | Silver | Bronze |
|---|---|---|---|
| Men's individual | Lee Dong-wook; South Korea | Park Kyung-mo; South Korea | Hiroshi Yamamoto; Japan |
| Men's team | South Korea | India | China |
| Women's individual | Lin Sang; China | An Se-jin; South Korea | Lee Sung-jin; South Korea |
| Women's team | South Korea | China | Chinese Taipei |

=== Compound ===
| Event | Gold | Silver | Bronze |
|---|---|---|---|
| Men's individual | Wang Chih-hao; Chinese Taipei | Ng Poh Khoon; Malaysia | Jo Young-joon; South Korea |
| Men's team | South Korea | Malaysia | Chinese Taipei |
| Women's individual | Choi Mi-yeon; South Korea | Yap Chow Kam; Hong Kong | Chen Li-yu; Chinese Taipei |

== Medal table ==
| Rank | Nation | Gold | Silver | Bronze | Total |
|---|---|---|---|---|---|
| 1 | South Korea | 5 | 2 | 2 | 9 |
| 2 | China | 1 | 1 | 1 | 3 |
| 3 | Chinese Taipei | 1 | 0 | 3 | 4 |
| 4 | Malaysia | 0 | 2 | 0 | 2 |
| 5 | Hong Kong | 0 | 1 | 0 | 1 |
| 5 | India | 0 | 1 | 0 | 1 |
| 7 | Japan | 0 | 0 | 1 | 1 |
| Totals (7 entries) | | 7 | 7 | 7 | 21 |
