= Marco Galiazzo =

Italian archer (born 1983)

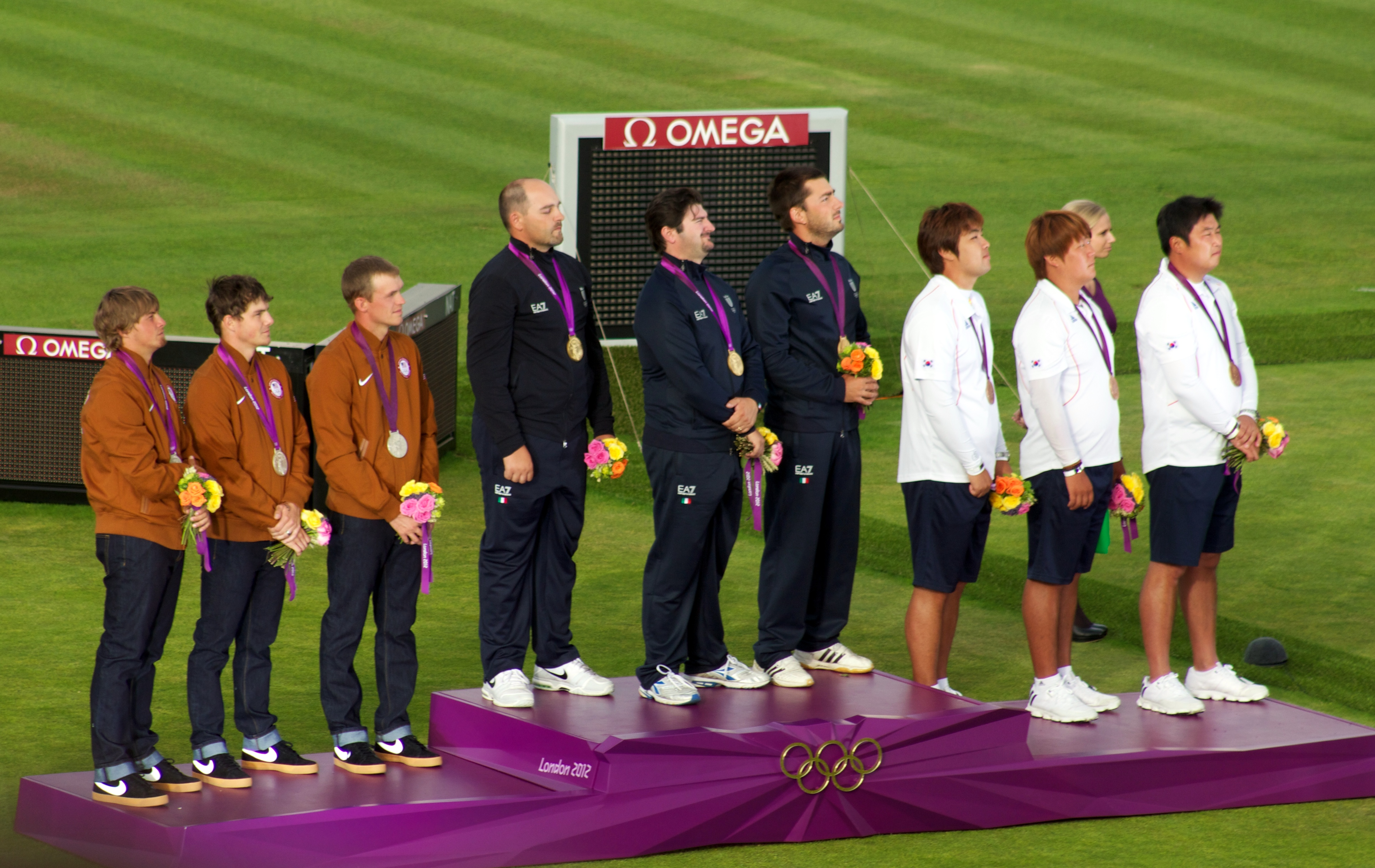
- Galiazzo (center in center podium)

Medal record

Representing Italy

Men's Archery

Olympic Games
Gold medal – first place	2004 Athens	Individual
Gold medal – first place	2012 London	Team
Silver medal – second place	2008 Beijing	Team

World Championships
Gold medal – first place	2017 Mexico	Team
Bronze medal – third place	2003 New York	Team
Bronze medal – third place	2011 Turin	Team

World Cup
Gold medal – first place	2009 Copenhagen	Individual

World Indoor Championships
Gold medal – first place	2012 Las Vegas	Individual

European Games
Bronze medal – third place	2019 Minsk	Team

Mediterranean Games
Gold medal – first place	2005 Almería	Individual

Marco Galiazzo (born 7 May 1983 in Padua) is an Italian archer. He competes for C.S. Aeronautica Militare, and is a former world number one. He was the first Olympic champion in the Italian archery history, winner of the gold medal in men's individual competition at Olympic Games – Athens 2004 and gold medal in team competition at the Olympic Games – London 2012 (in the same event he won silver at the Olympic Games – Beijing 2008).

== Career ==
Galiazzo started to shoot at the age of thirteen, together with his father, who later became his coach. His first win was at Italian Youth Games (Giochi della Gioventù), at the age of fourteen. At sixteen he was chosen for the first time for the Italian national archery team. His first team was the Compagnia Arcieri Padovani with whom he trained when he won the Olympic medal. Currently, he is a member of A.S.D. Archers Rio.

On 19 August 2004, he won the gold medal in the men's individual at the Athens Olympic Games, beating the Japanese archer Hiroshi Yamamoto in the final round. In the second round he beat teammate Ilario Di Buò.

On 3 February 2006, he entered the C.S. Aeronautica Militare.

On 18 April 2008 in Porec, Croatia, during the second leg of the Meteksan World Cup, he established the new Italian team record with Mauro Nespoli and Ilario Di Buò. On 11 August of the same year, together with Mauro Nespoli and Ilario Di Buò he won the silver medal in the team competition at Olympic Games – Beijing 2008, losing in the final against South Korea. Two days later he was defeated 109–110 in the second round of the individual competition against Alan Wills (ENG), losing the opportunity to retain the Olympic title won four years earlier.

On 28 July 2012, he won the gold medal at Olympic Games in London in the team competition, together with Michele Frangilli and Mauro Nespoli, beating the United States in the final.

== 2004 Summer Olympics ==
Galiazzo competed at the 2004 Summer Olympics in men's individual archery. He won his first three elimination matches, advancing to the quarterfinals. In the quarterfinals, Galiazzo faced Vic Wunderle of the United States, defeating Wunderle 109–108 in the 12-arrow match and advancing to the semifinals. There, he faced Laurence Godfrey of Great Britain, defeating Godfrey 110–108. Galiazzo then competed against Hiroshi Yamamoto of Japan in the gold medal match, winning 111–109 to earn the gold medal. He was also a member of the 7th-place Italian men's archery team at the 2004 Summer Olympics.
