= Tim Cuddihy =

Australian archer (born 1987)

Medal record

Men's archery

Representing Australia

Olympic Games
Bronze medal – third place	2004 Athens	Individual

Timothy John Cuddihy (born 21 May 1987) is an archer from Toowoomba, Australia, who competed at the 2004 Summer Olympics in men's individual matchplay archery. He won his first three elimination matches, advancing to the quarterfinals.

In the quarterfinals, Cuddihy faced Park Kyung-mo of Korea, defeating Park 112–111 in the 12-arrow match and advancing to the semifinals. There, he faced Hiroshi Yamamoto of Japan, losing to the eventual silver medalist in a 10–9 tie-breaker after the first 12 arrows resulted in a 115–115 tie. Cuddihy then competed against Laurence Godfrey of Great Britain in the bronze medal match, winning 113–112 to earn the bronze medal. Cuddihy was also a member of the 6th-place Australian men's archery team at the 2004 Summer Olympics.

Cuddihy retired temporarily from archery after failing to qualify for the 2008 Beijing Olympics, but returned to the Australian Institute of Sport's archery program in January 2010. The AIS Archery program ceased at the end of 2011.
