= Larry Godfrey =

British archer (born 1976)

Personal information
- Full name: Laurence Paul Godfrey
- Nickname: Larry
- Nationality: British
- Born: 9 June 1976 (age 50) Bristol, Gloucestershire, England, United Kingdom

Sport
- Country: Great Britain
- Sport: Archery
- Club: Cleve Archers

Achievements and titles
- Olympic finals: 2004 Athens – 4th (Ind)
Medal record
Representing Great Britain
World Championships
Silver medal – second place	2007 Leipzig	Men's Team
Bronze medal – third place	2011 Turin	Mixed Team

Laurence Paul Godfrey (born 9 June 1976) is a British archer.

He studied for an HND in Mechanical Manufacturing at the University of the West of England from 1997 to 2000.

== 2004 Summer Olympics ==
Godfrey was the only British male to qualify for the men's tournament at Athens 2004. He competed for the United Kingdom (as Great Britain) at the 2004 Summer Olympics in men's individual archery. He won his first three elimination matches, advancing to the quarterfinals. In the quarterfinals, Godfrey faced Chen Szu-yuan of Chinese Taipei, defeating Chen 110–108 in the 12-arrow match and advancing to the semifinals. There, he faced Marco Galiazzo of Italy, losing to the eventual gold medalist 110–108. Godfrey then competed against Tim Cuddihy of Australia in the bronze medal match, losing 113–112 to take 4th place overall.

== 2008 Summer Olympics ==
At the 2008 Summer Olympics in Beijing Godfrey finished his ranking round with a total of 657 points. This gave him the 34th seed for the final competition bracket in which he faced Bair Badënov in the first round. Badënov won the match with 114–109 and went on to win the bronze medal.

Together with Simon Terry and Alan Wills he also took part in the team event. With his 657 score from the ranking round combined with the 670 of Terry and the 661 of Wills the British were in fifth position after the ranking round. In the first elimination round they faced the Chinese team and got eliminated with 214–210. The Chinese went on to win the bronze medal.

== 2012 Summer Olympics ==
At the 2012 Summer Olympics in London, Godfrey finished 4th in the ranking round with a total of 680 points. He defeated Emdadul Haque Milon from Bangladesh in the 1/32 elimination round, winning 6-0 (scoring 84 out of a possible 90 points). He then went on to defeat Mexico's Juan Serrano, winning the first set, tying the second set, and then winning the final 2 sets, giving him a victory of 7–1. The 1/8 elimination round against Malaysian Khairul Anuar Mohamad was tied at 5–5 at the end of the 5th and final set. Mohamad won the one arrow shoot off and progressed to the quarterfinals, only to be defeated by Takaharu Furukawa from Japan who went on to win the silver medal.

== Individual performance timeline ==
Tournament	2002	2003	2004	2005	2006	2007	2008	2009	2010	2011	2012	2013	2014	SR
World Archery tournaments
Olympic Games			4th				1R				3R			0/3
World Championships				1R		2R		3R		QF		1R		0/5
World Cup														
Stage 1					1R	1R	1R	QF	2R	QF			3R	0/7
Stage 2					3R	2R	2R	2R	1R	4R	4R			0/7
Stage 3					QF	2R		3R	2R	3R	2nd		3R	0/7
Stage 4					2R	3R	2R	1R	2R	4R		2R		0/7
World Cup Final					DNQ	DNQ	DNQ	DNQ	DNQ	DNQ	QF	DNQ	DNQ	0/1
End of year world ranking	285	313	11	4	15	48	60	35	33	12	6	24		
