= Hiroshi Yamamoto (archer) =

Japanese archer (born 1962)

Personal information
- Born: 31 October 1962 (age 63) Yokohama, Japan
- Height: 170 cm (5 ft 7 in)
- Weight: 71 kg (157 lb)
Medal record
Men's recurve archery
Representing Japan
Olympic Games
Silver medal – second place	2004 Athens	Individual
Bronze medal – third place	1984 Los Angeles	Individual
World Championships
Bronze medal – third place	2009 Ulsan	Team
Asian Games
Gold medal – first place	1982 New Delhi	Individual
Gold medal – first place	2002 Busan	Individual
Silver medal – second place	1986 Seoul	Team
Silver medal – second place	1990 Beijing	Team
Silver medal – second place	1994 Hiroshima	Team
Bronze medal – third place	1986 Seoul	Individual 50m
Asian Championships
Bronze medal – third place	2003 Yangon	Individual

Hiroshi Yamamoto (山本 博, Yamamoto Hiroshi; born 31 October 1962) is a Japanese athlete who competes in archery, who is a former world number one.

He won a bronze medal in archery at the 1984 Summer Olympics.

Yamamoto competed at the 2004 Summer Olympics in men's individual archery. He won his first three elimination matches, advancing to the quarterfinals. In the quarterfinals, Yamamoto faced Im Dong-hyun of South Korea, defeating the 1st-ranked archer 111–110 in the 12-arrow match and advancing to the semifinals. There, he faced Tim Cuddihy of Australia, defeating the eventual bronze medalist in a 10–9 tie-breaker after the first 12 arrows resulted in a 115–115 tie. Yamamoto then competed against Marco Galiazzo of Italy in the gold medal match, losing 111–109 to finish with the silver medal.

Since 2004, Yamamoto has been a frequent guest on television programs in Japan, becoming a well recognized public figure.

Yamamoto was also a member of the 8th-place Japanese men's archery team at the 2004 Summer Olympics.
