= Park Kyung-mo =

South Korean archer (born 1975)

- Hangul: 박경모
- Hanja: 朴敬模
- RR: Bak Gyeongmo
- MR: Pak Kyŏngmo
- IPA: [pak̚.k͈jʌŋ.mo]

Park Kyung-mo
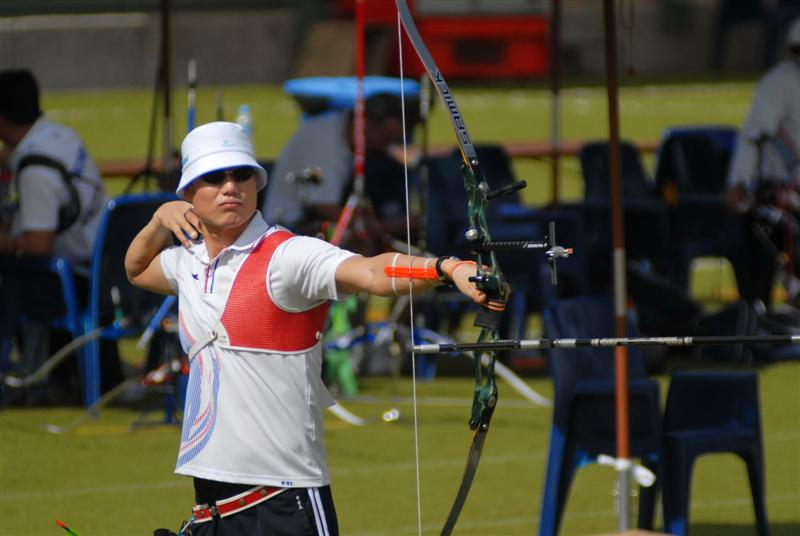

Medal record

Men's recurve archery

Representing South Korea

Olympic Games
Gold medal – first place	2004 Athens	Team
Gold medal – first place	2008 Beijing	Team
Silver medal – second place	2008 Beijing	Individual

World Championships
Gold medal – first place	1993 Antalya	Individual
Gold medal – first place	2001 Beijing	Team
Gold medal – first place	2003 New York	Team
Gold medal – first place	2005 Madrid	Team
Silver medal – second place	1993 Antalya	Team
Bronze medal – third place	2001 Beijing	Individual

World Cup Final
Gold medal – first place	2006 Merida	Individual

Asian Games
Gold medal – first place	1994 Hiroshima	Individual
Gold medal – first place	1994 Hiroshima	Team
Gold medal – first place	2006 Doha	Team

Asian Championships
Gold medal – first place	2003 Yangon	Team
Gold medal – first place	2005 New Delhi	Team
Silver medal – second place	2003 Yangon	Individual
Silver medal – second place	2007 Xi'an	Individual
Bronze medal – third place	2005 New Delhi	Individual
Bronze medal – third place	2007 Xi'an	Team

Park Kyung-mo (Korean: 박경모; born August 15, 1975) is an archer from South Korea. He has won gold medals at the three major World Archery Federation events (Olympics, World Archery Championships and World Cup finals) and is a former world number one.

He is married to archer Park Sung-hyun.

== 2004 Summer Olympics ==
Park competed for Korea at the 2004 Summer Olympics in men's individual archery. He won his first three elimination matches, advancing to the quarterfinals. In the quarterfinals, Park faced Tim Cuddihy of Australia, losing to the eventual bronze medalist 112-111 in the 12-arrow match. Park placed 5th overall and holds the Olympic record for an 18-arrow match at 70 meters. He scored 173 points out of the potential 180 to set the record. He was also a member of Korea's gold medal men's archery team at the 2004 Summer Olympics.

== 2008 Summer Olympics ==
At the 2008 Summer Olympics in Beijing Park finished his ranking round with a total of 676 points, three points behind leader Juan René Serrano. This gave him the fourth seed for the final competition bracket in which he faced Luiz Trainini in the first round, beating the Brazilian 116-99. In the second round Park was too strong for Kuo Cheng Wei (111-110) and via Rafał Dobrowolski (113-105) in the third round he advanced to the quarter-finals. There he and Juan Carlos Stevens both came to 108 points and an extra round was needed. Here Park scored 19 points and Stevens 17, which brought Park into the semi-final, in which he was too strong for ranking round winner Serrano. In the final he came one point too short to equal Viktor Ruban for the gold and had to be satisfied with the silver medal, 113-112.

Together with Lee Chang-Hwan and Im Dong-Hyun he also took part in the team event. With his 676 score from the ranking round combined with the 670 of Im and the 669 of Lee the Koreans were in first position after the ranking round, which gave them a straight seed into the quarter-finals. With 224-222 they were too strong for the Polish team and in the semi-final they beat home nation China 221-218. In the final Italy came close, but South Korea took the title with 227-225.

== See also ==
- Korean archery
- Archery
- List of South Korean archers
