= Im Dong-hyun =

South Korean archer (born 1986)

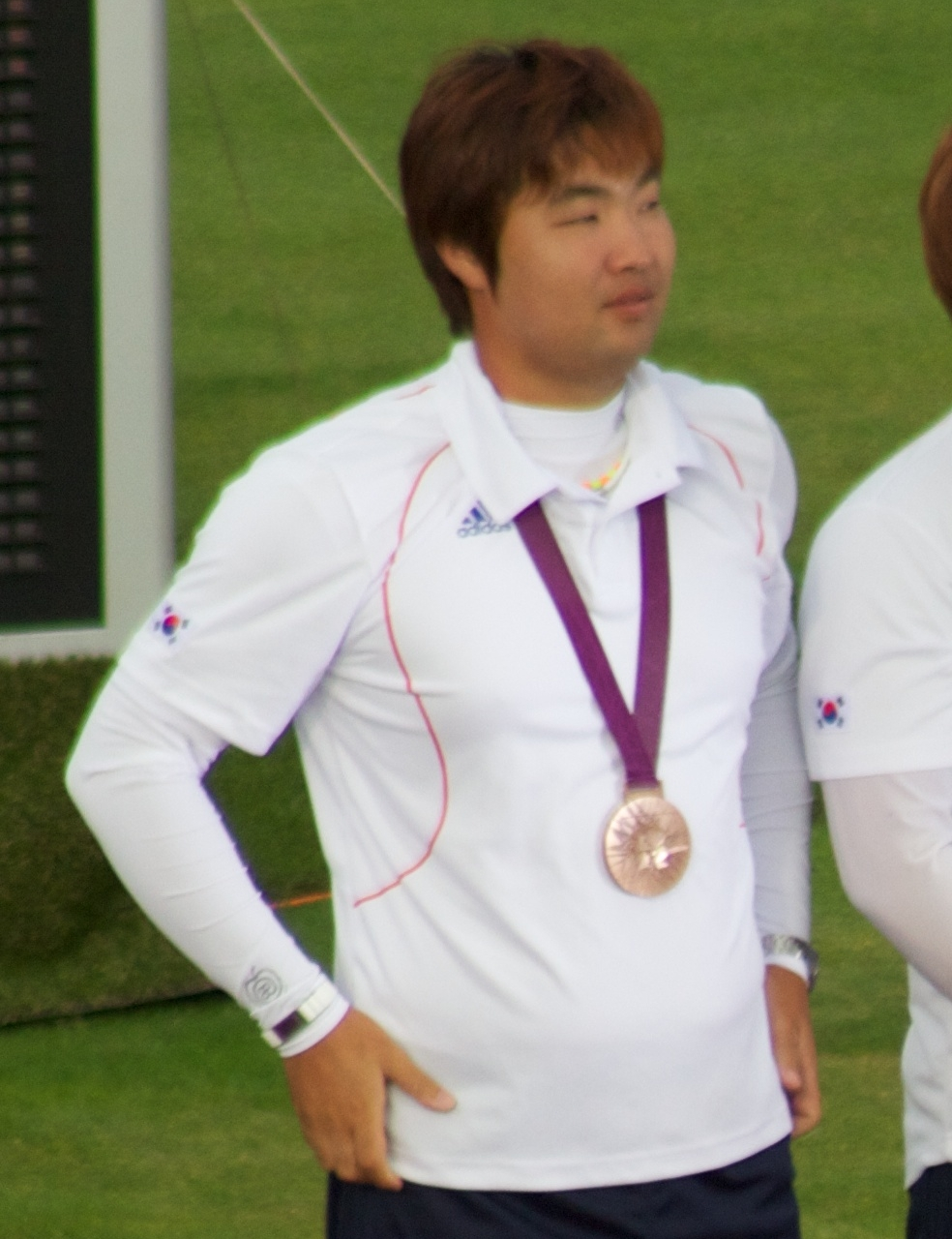
- Im Dong-hyun at the 2012 Summer Olympics

Personal information
- Born: 12 May 1986 (age 40) Chungju, South Korea
- Height: 1.84 m (6 ft 0 in)
- Weight: 100 kg (220 lb)

Sport
- Country: South Korea
- Sport: Archery
Medal record
Men's recurve archery
Representing South Korea
Olympic Games
Gold medal – first place	2004 Athens	Team
Gold medal – first place	2008 Beijing	Team
Bronze medal – third place	2012 London	Team
World Championships
Gold medal – first place	2003 New York	Team
Gold medal – first place	2007 Leipzig	Individual
Gold medal – first place	2007 Leipzig	Team
Gold medal – first place	2009 Ulsan	Team
Gold medal – first place	2011 Turin	Mixed Team
Gold medal – first place	2011 Turin	Team
Gold medal – first place	2017 Mexico	Individual
Gold medal – first place	2017 Mexico	Mixed Team
Silver medal – second place	2003 New York	Individual
Silver medal – second place	2009 Ulsan	Individual
Bronze medal – third place	2017 Mexico	Team
World Cup Final
Gold medal – first place	2008 Lausanne	Individual
Silver medal – second place	2010 Edinburgh	Individual
Bronze medal – third place	2017 Rome	Individual
Asian Games
Gold medal – first place	2002 Busan	Team
Gold medal – first place	2006 Doha	Individual
Gold medal – first place	2006 Doha	Team
Gold medal – first place	2010 Guangzhou	Team
Bronze medal – third place	2002 Busan	Individual
Asian Championships
Gold medal – first place	2005 New Delhi	Individual
Gold medal – first place	2005 New Delhi	Team
Gold medal – first place	2015 Bangkok	Team
Bronze medal – third place	2015 Bangkok	Individual
Universiade
Gold medal – first place	2011 Shenzhen	Individual
Silver medal – second place	2005 İzmir	Team

- Im Dong-hyun
- Hangul: 임동현
- Hanja: 林東賢
- RR: Im Donghyeon
- MR: Im Tonghyŏn

Im Dong-hyun (Korean: 임동현; Korean pronunciation: [im.doŋ.ɦjʌn]; born 12 May 1986) is a South Korean archer. He competes for the South Korean national team and is a former world number one. He has 20/200 vision in his left eye and 20/100 vision in his right, so he must be 10 times as close as someone with normal eyesight to see objects clearly with his left eye.

== Career ==
=== 2004 Summer Olympics ===
At the 2004 Summer Olympics, Im set a world record in the 72 arrow men's individual ranking round, with a score of 687 (it was not recognized by the International Olympic Committee as an Olympic record, however, as the ranking round took place on 12 August, before the 2004 opening ceremony). He then won his first three elimination matches, advancing to the quarterfinals. In the quarterfinals, Im faced Hiroshi Yamamoto of Japan, losing to the eventual silver medalist 111–110 in the 12-arrow match. Im was placed 6th overall.

Im was also a member of Korea's gold medal men's archery team at the 2004 Summer Olympics.

=== 2006 Asian Games ===
In 2006, he competed at the 2006 Asian Games and won two gold medals in the individual and South Korean team.

=== 2008 Summer Olympics ===
At the 2008 Summer Olympics in Beijing, Im finished his ranking round with a total of 670 points, nine points behind leader Juan René Serrano. This made him the eighth seed for the final competition bracket in which he faced Ali Salem in the first round, beating the Qatari 108–103. In the second round Im was too strong for Butch Johnson (115–106), but in the third round another American, Vic Wunderle, eliminated him with 113–111.

Together with Lee Chang-hwan and Park Kyung-mo, he also took part in the team event. With his 670 score from the ranking round combined with the 676 of Park and the 669 of Lee the Koreans were in first position after the ranking round, which gave them a straight seeding into the quarter-finals. With a score of 224–222 they were too strong for the Polish team and in the semi-final they beat home nation China 221–218. In the final Italy came close, but South Korea took the title with 227–225.

=== 2012 Summer Olympics ===
On 27 July 2012 at the 2012 Summer Olympics in London, he set a new world record score of 699 in the ranking round at Lord's Cricket Ground, beating his compatriot Kim Bub-min by one point. Although he was the top seed after the ranking round, he was eliminated in the round of 16, losing 7–1 to Rick van der Ven. Im did win a bronze medal with the South Korean team.
