= Archery at the 2004 Summer Olympics – Men's team =

Men's team at the Games of the XXVIII Olympiad
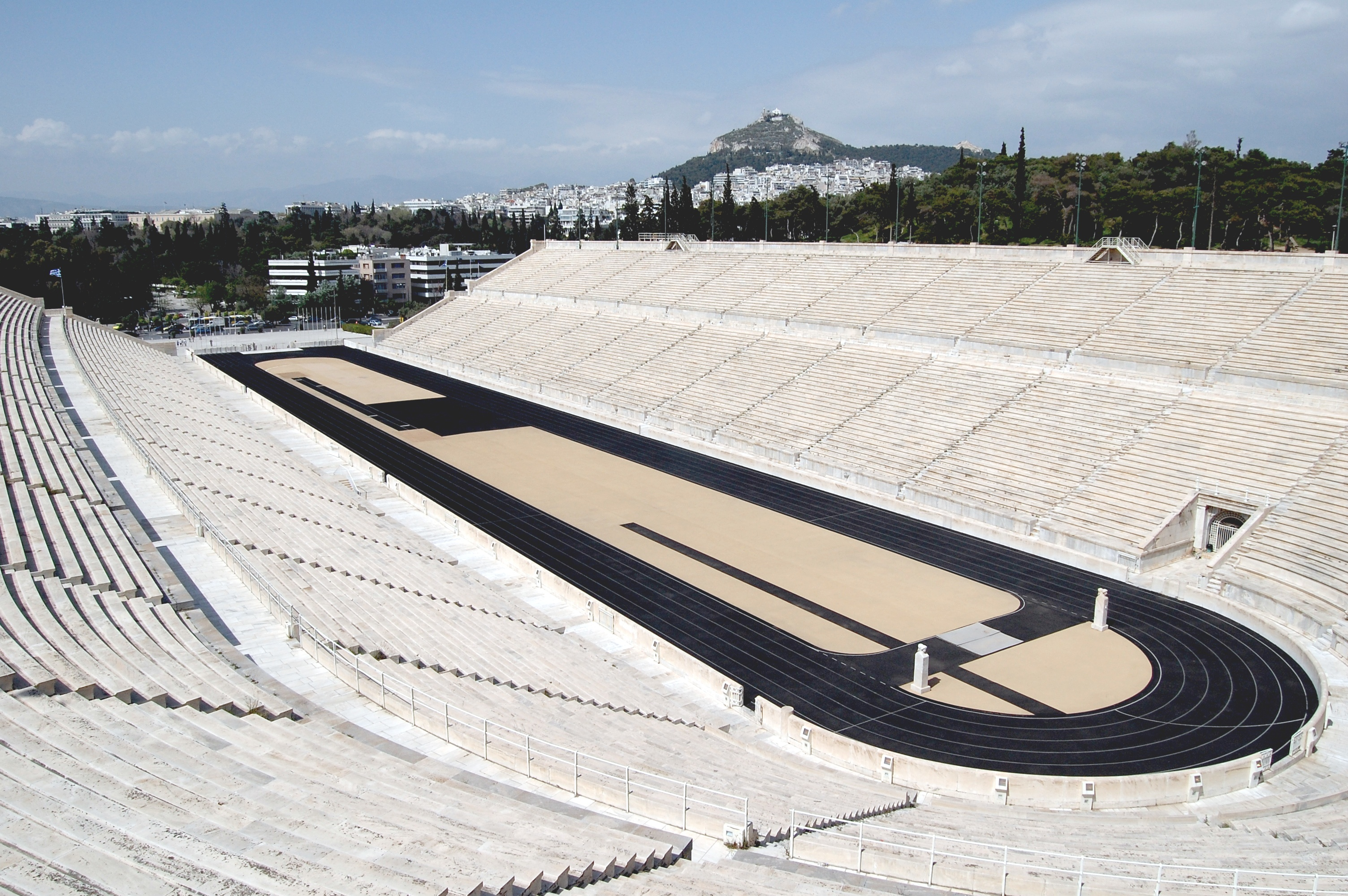
- Panathinaiko Stadium, where the event was held
- Venue: Panathinaiko Stadium
- Date: 21 August 2004
- Competitors: 39 from 13 nations

Medalists
1st place, gold medalist(s)		Im Dong-hyun; Jang Yong-ho; Park Kyung-mo	South Korea
2nd place, silver medalist(s)		Chen Szu-yuan; Liu Ming-huang; Wang Cheng-pang	Chinese Taipei
3rd place, bronze medalist(s)		Dmytro Hrachov; Viktor Ruban; Oleksandr Serdyuk	Ukraine

The Men's team at the 2004 Summer Olympics as part of the archery programme were held at the Panathinaiko Stadium.

The men's team competition was the last archery event to be held, on 21 August. The Korean team, after having been kept from winning any individual medals, won by successively larger margins as the rounds went by.

== Ranking round ==
The team ranking round consisted merely of summing the scores of the team's three competitors from the individual ranking round.

Seed	Team	Score			
Seed	Team	1	2	3	Total
1	South Korea	687	672	671	2030
2	Chinese Taipei	663	663	659	1985
3	Italy	672	659	654	1985
4	Ukraine	671	660	654	1985
5	Japan	664	660	646	1970
6	Sweden	673	653	637	1963
7	Australia	663	658	641	1962
8	Mexico	651	646	645	1942
9	Netherlands	661	646	633	1940
10	India	657	647	634	1938
11	United States	660	639	637	1936
12	France	663	626	622	1911
13	Greece	647	601	585	1833

== Competition bracket ==
The United States and the Netherlands both pulled off minor upsets in the first round of competition, the round of 16. The Korean, Italian, and Taiwanese teams sat out due to their high rankings.

Korea's margin of victory in the semifinals was somewhat larger than in the quarterfinals, though this was more due to a weaker performance by their opponent than anything else as Korea shot 8 points fewer than they had in the previous round. Chinese Taipei narrowly defeated the United States to avoid the upset.

Both teams in the bronze medal final shot their lowest score of the competition. The United States, who had outscored Ukraine in each of the previous rounds, was unable to do so in direct competition with the Ukrainians and fell to fourth place while the Ukrainians collected their first archery medal of the year.

The final turned out to be the easiest victory for the Korean team in the entire tournament, a 6-point win over Chinese Taipei.

Round of 16
South Korea	—
Bye	—
Netherlands	244
Mexico	234
Japan	254
France	241
Ukraine	243
Greece	225
Italy	—
Bye	—
United States	246
Sweden	242
Australia	248
India	236
Chinese Taipei	—
Bye	—

Quarterfinals
South Korea	250
Netherlands	249
Ukraine	242
Japan	236
United States	243
Italy	240
Chinese Taipei	250
Australia	247

Semifinals
South Korea	242
Ukraine	239
Chinese Taipei	244
United States	243

Finals
South Korea	251
Chinese Taipei	245

Bronze Medal Match: Ukraine def. United States 237-235
