= Pieter Custers =

Dutch archer

Pieter Johan Jozef Maria Custers (born 13 March 1984 in Weert) is an athlete from the Netherlands, who competes in archery. He was a member of the Dutch junior archery team, that won the European championship in 2001.

Competing on the senior team, Custers helped the team win the silver medal in the 2002 European championships. The team came sixth in the 2003 world championship. The 2004 European championships resulted in a bronze medal for Custers in the individual competition as well as a gold medal in the team competition. This qualified the squad for Olympic competition in Athens 2004.

At the 2004 Summer Olympics Custers was defeated in the first round of elimination, placing 44th overall in men's individual archery. He had scored 646 points on 72 arrows in the ranking round before being defeated 145-141 in the round of 64.

Custers was also a member of the Netherlands' 5th-place men's archery team at the 2004 Summer Olympics. This team placed 6th at the 2003 World Championship.
