= Wang Cheng-pang =

Taiwanese archer (born 1987)

Personal information
- Born: 12 January 1987 (age 39) Hualien City, Taiwan
- Height: 178 cm (5 ft 10 in)
- Weight: 84 kg (185 lb)

Sport
- Sport: Archery
Medal record
Men's recurve archery
Representing Chinese Taipei
Olympic Games
Silver medal – second place	2004 Athens	Team
Asian Games
Silver medal – second place	2002 Busan	Team
Silver medal – second place	2006 Doha	Team
Asian Championships
Gold medal – first place	2007 Xi'an	Individual
Bronze medal – third place	2009 Denpasar	Team
Universiade
Silver medal – second place	2009 Belgrade	Individual
Silver medal – second place	2009 Belgrade	Team

Wang Cheng-pang (Chinese: 王正邦; pinyin: Wáng Zhèngbāng; born 12 January 1987) is a Taiwanese professional archer representing Chinese Taipei.

== 2004 Summer Olympics ==
Wang competed for the Republic of China (as Chinese Taipei) at the 2004 Summer Olympics in men's individual archery. He won his first match, advancing to the round of 32. In the second round of elimination, he was defeated. His final rank was 17th overall. Wang was also a member of Chinese Taipei's silver medal men's archery team at the 2004 Summer Olympics.

He also competed in archery at the 2006 Asian Games and won a silver medal with the men's team consisting of himself, Chen Szu-yuan, Kuo Cheng-wei and Hsu Tzu-yi.

== 2008 Summer Olympics ==
At the 2008 Summer Olympics in Beijing Wang finished his ranking round with a total of 667 points, twelve points behind leader Juan René Serrano. This gave him the 11th seed for the final competition bracket in which he faced Tashi Peljor in the first round, beating the Bhutani 110–100. In the second round Wang could not compete with Moriya Ryuichi and lost with 114–109. Together with Chen Szu-Yuan and Kuo Cheng-Wei he also took part in the team event. With his 667 score from the ranking round combined with the 654 of Chen and the 659 of Kuo they were in seventh position after the ranking round. In the first round they were too strong for the American team 222–218, but in the quarter-final they were unable to beat the Ukrainian team 214–211.

== 2012 Summer Olympics ==
At the 2012 Summer Olympics, he was ranked 33rd after the ranking round of the men's individual event. He faced Daniel Felipe Pineda of Colombia in the first knockout round, winning 6 - 0. He then lost 4–6 to Im Dong Hyun in the last 32. In the team event, he was part of the team that lost 206–216 to eventual gold medalists Italy.
