= Liu Ming-huang =

Taiwanese archer

Olympic medal record

Men's Archery
Silver medal – second place	2004 Athens	Team

Liu Ming-huang (Chinese: 劉明煌; pinyin: Liú Mínghuáng; born 17 September 1984) is a Taiwanese archer who competed at the 2004 Summer Olympics.

Liu competed for the Republic of China (as Chinese Taipei) at the 2004 Summer Olympics in men's individual archery. He won his first match, advancing to the round of 32, but was later defeated in the second round of elimination. His final rank was 26th overall. Liu was also a member of Chinese Taipei's men's archery team, which won a silver medal.
