= Vic Wunderle =

American archer (born 1976)

Personal information
- Full name: Victor Steven Wunderle
- Born: March 4, 1976 (age 50) Lincoln, Illinois, U.S.
Medal record
Men's archery
Representing the United States
Olympic Games
Silver medal – second place	2000 Sydney	Individual
Bronze medal – third place	2000 Sydney	Team
Pan American Games
Gold medal – first place	1995 Mar del Plata	Individual (30 m)
Gold medal – first place	1995 Mar del Plata	Individual (50 m)
Gold medal – first place	1995 Mar del Plata	Team
Gold medal – first place	1999 Winnipeg	Team
Gold medal – first place	2003 Santo Domingo	Individual
Gold medal – first place	2003 Santo Domingo	Team
Gold medal – first place	2007 Rio de Janeiro	Team
Silver medal – second place	1995 Mar del Plata	Individual
Bronze medal – third place	2007 Rio de Janeiro	Individual
World Championships
Bronze medal – third place	1999 Riom	Team (recurve)

Victor Steven Wunderle (born March 4, 1976) is an archer from the United States.

== Biography ==
Wunderle was raised in Mason City, Illinois, and is the son of the famous archery coach Terry Wunderle. His passion for archery started at the age five. He competed in many competitions and received many honors throughout his childhood. After graduating from Illini Central High School in 1994, he attended Texas A&M University, where he graduated in 2002 with a degree in Wildlife and Fisheries Sciences.

== 2000 Summer Olympics ==
Wunderle won the silver medal in archery at the 2000 Summer Olympics. In the semifinals, he barely defeated Magnus Petersson of Sweden, scoring 108–107 in the 12-arrow match to advance to the gold medal final. There, he faced Simon Fairweather, a favorite son of the host country of Australia. Wunderle was defeated 113–106, taking 2nd place and the silver medal in the competition.

He also was a member of the American team that defeated Russia in a tie-breaker to win the bronze medal in the team competition.

== 2004 Summer Olympics ==
Wunderle competed at the 2004 Summer Olympics in men's individual archery. He won his first three elimination matches, advancing to the quarterfinals. In the quarterfinals, Wunderle faced Marco Galiazzo of Italy, losing to the eventual gold medalist 109–108 in the 12-arrow match. Wunderle placed 8th overall.

Wunderle was also a member of the 4th-place American men's archery team at the 2004 Summer Olympics.

== 2006 Gold Cup ==
He defeated a promising young French archer, Pierre Georgeault, coached by Yann Léguillon, in the 16th of finals of the competition. He won third place in his match against Crispin Duenas of Canada.

== 2008 Summer Olympics ==
At the 2008 Summer Olympics in Beijing Wunderle finished his ranking round with a total of 652 points. This gave him the 41st seed for the final competition bracket in which he faced Eduardo Vélez in the first round, beating him 106–102. In the second round Wunderle and his opponent Ilario Di Buò both scored 108 points in the regular match and had to go to an extra round. In this extra round Di Buò scored 17 points, while Wunderle advanced to the third round with 19 points. Wunderle reached the quarter-final by beating Im Dong-Hyun with 113–111, but was eliminated by Juan René Serrano of Mexico, who was the first seed after scoring 679 in the ranking round.

Together with Brady Ellison and Butch Johnson he also took part in the team event. With his 652 score from the ranking round combined with the 664 of Ellison and the 653 of Johnson the Americans were in 10th position after the ranking round. In the first round they were not able to win against Chinese Taipei that won the confrontation by 222–218.

== Sources ==
- "Vic Wunderle's biography". vicwunderle.com.
- "11th Annual GOLD CUP TOURNAMENT / Bloomfield, New Jersey / 3-4 June 2006" (PDF). njarchery.org. Archived from the original (PDF) on February 21, 2007.
- Evans, Hilary; Gjerde, Arild; Heijmans, Jeroen; Mallon, Bill; et al. "Vic Wunderle". Olympics at Sports-Reference.com. Sports Reference LLC. Archived from the original on April 18, 2020.
