= Chen Szu-yuan =

Taiwanese archer (born 1981)

Personal information
- Born: 7 February 1981 (age 45)
- Height: 170 cm (5 ft 7 in)
- Weight: 70 kg (154 lb)
Medal record
Men's recurve archery
Representing Chinese Taipei
Olympic Games
| Silver medal – second place | 2004 Athens | Team |
Asian Games
| Silver medal – second place | 2006 Doha | Team |
Asian Championships
| Bronze medal – third place | 2005 New Delhi | Team |
| Bronze medal – third place | 2009 Denpasar | Team |

Chen Szu-yuan (Chinese: 陳詩園; pinyin: Chén Shīyuán; born 7 February 1981) is an athlete from the Republic of China. He competes in archery.

== 2004 Summer Olympics ==
Chen competed for the Republic of China (as Chinese Taipei) at the 2004 Summer Olympics in men's individual archery. He won his first three elimination matches, advancing to the quarterfinals. In the quarterfinals, Chen faced Laurence Godfrey of Great Britain, losing 110-108 in the 12-arrow match. Chen placed 7th overall. Chen was also a member of Chinese Taipei's silver medal men's archery team at the 2004 Summer Olympics.

== 2008 Summer Olympics ==
At the 2008 Summer Olympics in Beijing Chen finished his ranking round with a total of 654 points. This gave him the 38th seed for the final competition bracket in which he faced Muhammad Marbawi in the first round, beating the Malaysian 107-106. In the second round Chen faced Balzhinima Tsyrempilov and was eliminated by 109-101.

Together with Kuo Cheng-wei and Wang Cheng-pang he also took part in the team event. With his 654 score from the ranking round combined with the 667 of Pang and the 659 of Kuo they were in seventh position after the ranking round. In the first round they were too strong for the American team 222-218, but in the quarter-final they were unable to beat the Ukrainian team 214-211.
