= Archery at the 2004 Summer Olympics – Women's individual =

Women's individual at the Games of the XXVIII Olympiad
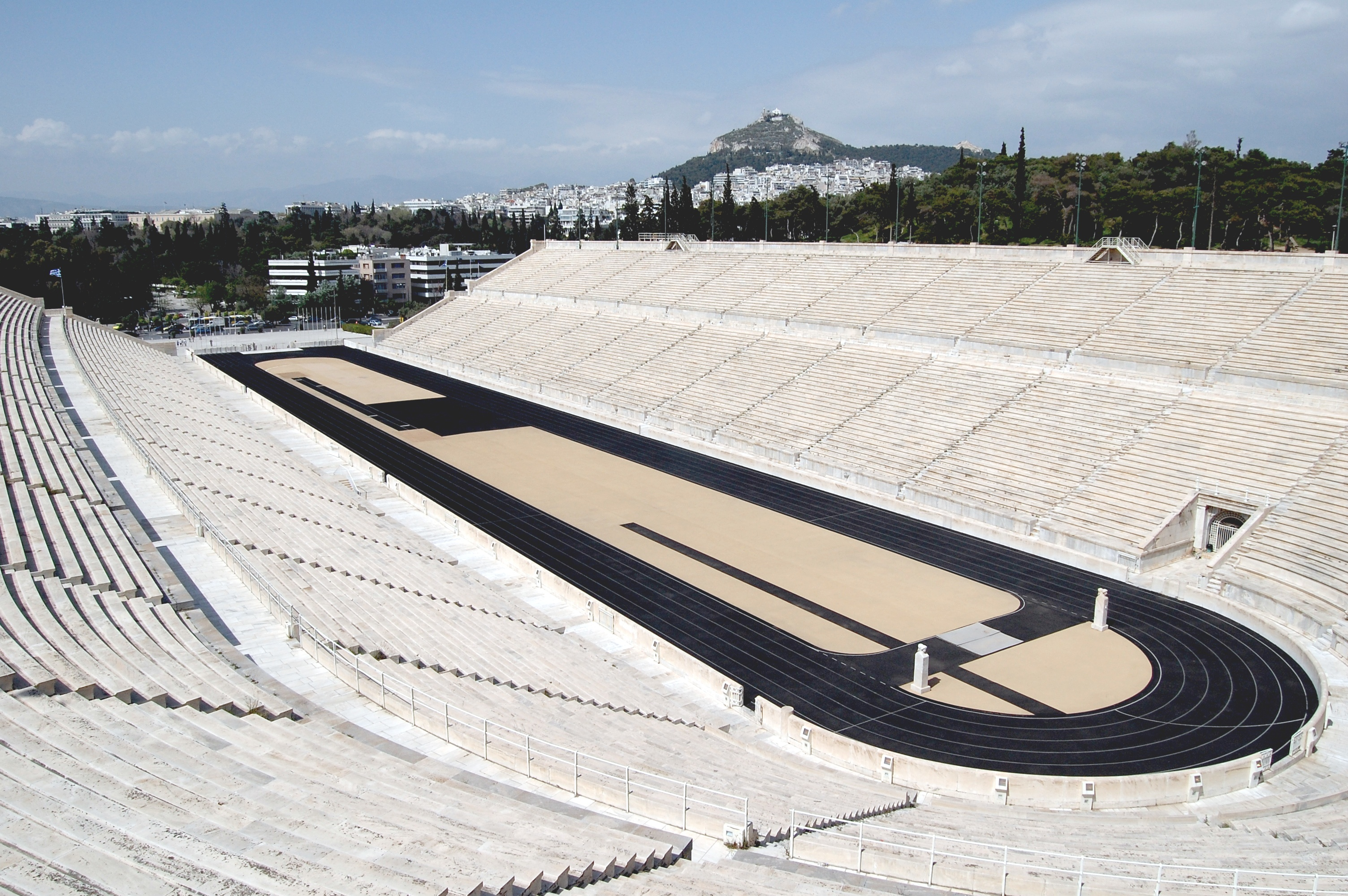
- Panathinaiko Stadium, where the event was held
- Venue: Panathinaiko Stadium
- Dates: 15–18 August 2004

Medalists
1st place, gold medalist(s)		Park Sung-hyun	South Korea
2nd place, silver medalist(s)		Lee Sung-jin	South Korea
3rd place, bronze medalist(s)		Alison Williamson	Great Britain

The women's individual at the 2004 Summer Olympics as part of the archery programme were held at the Panathinaiko Stadium.

The heavily favored Korean women, who had taken the top three spots in the ranking round, won gold and silver medals as well as setting a new world record for a 72-arrow round. Park Sung-hyun and Lee Sung Jin defeated every opponent they faced until their final match against each other, which Park won for the gold medal. Alison Williamson of Great Britain, who was ranked only 21st after the ranking round, was able to win a number of upsets to make it to the semi-finals. After losing that match, she pulled off one more upset to finish with a bronze medal.

== Ranking round ==
The ranking round was held on 12 August at 09:00 at Dekelia Air Force Base. In the 72 arrow ranking round, the Korean women dominated the field, taking the top three spots and setting a world record with Park Sung-hyun's score of 682. The Chinese women also did well, placing 4th, 5th, and 11th. Yuan Shu Chi and Wu Hui Ju of Chinese Taipei finished 6th and 10th.

Rank	Archer	Nation	Score
1	Park Sung-hyun	South Korea	682
2	Lee Sung-jin	South Korea	675
3	Yun Mi-Jin	South Korea	673
4	He Ying	China	667
5	Zhang Juanjuan	China	663
6	Yuan Shu Chi	Chinese Taipei	658
7	Justyna Mospinek	Poland	657
8	Evangelia Psarra	Greece	652
9	Natalia Valeeva	Italy	650
10	Wu Hui Ju	Chinese Taipei	649
11	Lin Sang	China	647
12	Nataliya Burdeyna	Ukraine	643
13	Dola Banerjee	India	642
14	Tetyana Berezhna	Ukraine	640
15	Margarita Galinovskaya	Russia	639
16	Natalia Nasaridze	Turkey	639
17	Naomi Folkard	Great Britain	638
18	Cornelia Pfohl	Germany	638
19	Jennifer Nichols	United States	638
20	Sumangala Sharma	India	638
21	Alison Williamson	Great Britain	637
22	Kristine Esebua	Georgia	636
23	Anja Hitzler	Germany	632
24	Almudena Gallardo	Spain	631
25	Zekiye Keskin Satir	Turkey	631
26	Viktoriya Beloslydtseva	Kazakhstan	629
27	Małgorzata Sobieraj	Poland	628
28	Iwona Marcinkiewicz	Poland	628
29	Melissa Jennison	Australia	628
30	Alexandra Fouace	France	627
31	Bérengère Schuh	France	626
32	Mon Redee Sut Txi	Malaysia	626
33	Natalia Bolotova	Russia	625
34	Elpida Romantzi	Greece	624
35	Sayami Matsushita	Japan	624
36	Stephanie Arnold	United States	623
37	Yukari Kawasaki	Japan	622
38	Thin Thin Khaing	Myanmar	622
39	Deonne Bridger	Australia	620
40	Wiebke Nulle	Germany	620
41	Khatuna Narimanidze	Georgia	620
42	Damla Gunay	Turkey	620
43	Reena Kumari	India	620
44	Janet Dykman	United States	619
45	Chen Li Ju	Chinese Taipei	617
46	Puspitasari Rina Dewi	Indonesia	616
47	Marie-Pier Beaudet	Canada	616
48	Olga Pilipova	Kazakhstan	616
49	Mari Piuva	Finland	615
50	Elena Dostay	Russia	609
51	Fotini Vavatsi	Greece	609
52	Kirstin Jean Lewis	South Africa	606
53	Sayoko Kawauchi	Japan	601
54	Tshering Chhoden	Bhutan	600
55	Narguis Nabieva	Tajikistan	600
56	Jasmin Figueroa	Philippines	600
57	Jo-Ann Galbraith	Australia	596
58	Maydenia Sarduy	Cuba	595
59	Kateryna Palekha	Ukraine	595
60	Aurore Trayan	France	594
61	Helen Palmer	Great Britain	594
62	Hanna Karasiova	Belarus	588
63	Lamia Bahnasawy	Egypt	564
64	May Mansour	Egypt	536

== Competition bracket ==
=== Section 1 ===
Round of 64
1	Park Sung-hyun (KOR)	154
64	May Mansour (EGY)	102
33	Natalia Bolotova (RUS)	154
32	Mon Redee Sut Txi (MAS)	143
17	Naomi Folkard (GBR)	139
48	Olga Pilipova (KAZ)	128
49	Mari Piuva (FIN)	136
16	Natalia Nasaridze (TUR)	133
56	Jasmin Figueroa (PHI)	132
9	Natalia Valeeva (ITA)	130
24	Almudena Gallardo (ESP)	148
41	Khatuna Narimanidze (GEO)	132
25	Zekiye Keskin Satir (TUR)	135^{10}
40	Wiebke Nulle (GER)	135^{7}
8	Evangelia Psarra (GRE)	138
57	Jo-Ann Galbraith (AUS)	116

Round of 32
1	Park Sung-hyun (KOR)	165
33	Natalia Bolotova (RUS)	148
17	Naomi Folkard (GBR)	156
49	Mari Piuva (FIN)	151
56	Jasmin Figueroa (PHI)	150
24	Almudena Gallardo (ESP)	152
25	Zekiye Keskin Satir (TUR)	161
8	Evangelia Psarra (GRE)	163

Round of 16
1	Park Sung-hyun (KOR)	171
17	Naomi Folkard (GBR)	159
24	Almudena Gallardo (ESP)	152
8	Evangelia Psarra (GRE)	160

Quarterfinals
1	Park Sung-hyun (KOR)	111
8	Evangelia Psarra (GRE)	101

=== Section 2 ===
Round of 64
5	Zhang Juanjuan (CHN)	135
60	Aurore Trayan (FRA)	122
28	Iwona Marcinkiewicz (POL)	119
37	Yukari Kawasaki (JPN)	106
21	Alison Williamson (GBR)	147
44	Janet Dykman (USA)	121
53	Sayoko Kawauchi (JPN)	137
12	Nataliya Burdeyna (UKR)	129
52	Kirstin Jean Lewis (RSA)	141
13	Dola Banerjee (IND)	131
20	Sumangala Sharma (IND)	142
45	Chen Li Ju (TPE)	133
29	Melissa Jennison (AUS)	132
36	Stephanie Arnold (USA)	121
4	He Ying (CHN)	141
61	Helen Palmer (GBR)	130

Round of 32
5	Zhang Juanjuan (CHN)	166
28	Iwona Marcinkiewicz (POL)	157
21	Alison Williamson (GBR)	154
53	Sayoko Kawauchi (JPN)	150
52	Kirstin Jean Lewis (RSA)	157
20	Sumangala Sharma (IND)	153
29	Melissa Jennison (AUS)	158^{8}
4	He Ying (CHN)	158^{9}

Round of 16
5	Zhang Juanjuan (CHN)	161
21	Alison Williamson (GBR)	165
52	Kirstin Jean Lewis (RSA)	142
4	He Ying (CHN)	156

Quarterfinals
21	Alison Williamson (GBR)	109
4	He Ying (CHN)	89

=== Section 3 ===
Round of 64
3	Yun Mi-Jin (KOR)	162
62	Hanna Karasiova (BLR)	155
35	Sayami Matsushita (JPN)	165
30	Alexandra Fouace (FRA)	157
19	Jennifer Nichols (USA)	160
46	Puspitasari Rina Dewi (INA)	141
14	Tetyana Berezhna (UKR)	160
51	Fotini Vavatsi (GRE)	156
54	Tshering Chhoden (BHU)	159
11	Lin Sang (CHN)	156
43	Reena Kumari (IND)	153
22	Kristine Esebua (GEO)	149
27	Małgorzata Sobieraj (POL)	151^{9,9,8,9}
38	Thin Thin Khaing (MYA)	151^{9,9,8,7}
6	Yuan Shu Chi (TPE)	162
59	Kateryna Palekha (UKR)	158

Round of 32
3	Yun Mi-Jin (KOR)	173
35	Sayami Matsushita (JPN)	149
19	Jennifer Nichols (USA)	163
14	Tetyana Berezhna (UKR)	160
54	Tshering Chhoden (BHU)	134^{4}
43	Reena Kumari (IND)	134^{7}
27	Małgorzata Sobieraj (POL)	149
6	Yuan Shu Chi (TPE)	158

Round of 16
3	Yun Mi-Jin (KOR)	168
19	Jennifer Nichols (USA)	162
43	Reena Kumari (IND)	148
6	Yuan Shu Chi (TPE)	166

Quarterfinals
3	Yun (KOR)	105
6	Yuan Shu Chi (TPE)	107

=== Section 4 ===
Round of 64
7	Justyna Mospinek (POL)	162
58	Maydenia Sarduy (CUB)	145
26	Viktoriya Beloslydtseva (KAZ)	150
39	Deonne Bridger (AUS)	145
23	Anja Hitzler (GER)	163
42	Damla Gunay (TUR)	152
10	Wu Hui Ju (TPE)	156
55	Narguis Nabieva (TJK)	142
15	Margarita Galinovskaya (RUS)	153
50	Elena Dostay (RUS)	136
18	Cornelia Pfohl (GER)	146
47	Marie-Pier Beaudet (CAN)	128
34	Elpida Romantzi (GRE)	151
31	Bérengère Schuh (FRA)	143
2	Lee Sung-jin (KOR)	164
63	Lamia Bahnasawy (EGY)	127

Round of 32
7	Justyna Mospinek (POL)	163
26	Viktoriya Beloslydtseva (KAZ)	155
23	Anja Hitzler (GER)	156^{8}
10	Wu Hui Ju (TPE)	156^{9}
15	Margarita Galinovskaya (RUS)	158
18	Cornelia Pfohl (GER)	156
34	Elpida Romantzi (GRE)	146
2	Lee Sung-jin (KOR)	166

Round of 16
7	Justyna Mospinek (POL)	151
10	Wu Hui Ju (TPE)	160
15	Margarita Galinovskaya (RUS)	163
2	Lee Sung-jin (KOR)	165

Quarterfinals
10	Wu (TPE)	103
2	Lee Sung-jin (KOR)	104

=== Finals ===
Semifinals
1	Park Sung-hyun (KOR)	110
21	Alison Williamson (GBR)	100
2	Lee Sung-jin (KOR)	104
6	Yuan Shu Chi (TPE)	98

Finals
1	Park Sung-hyun (KOR)	110
2	Lee Sung-jin (KOR)	108
Third place
21	Alison Williamson (GBR)	105
6	Yuan Shu Chi (TPE)	104

== Event summary ==
Round of 64

In the first round of elimination on 15 August, archers competed head-to-head. Each fired six ends of three arrows. Winners advanced to the round of 32, while losers received a final ranking between 33 and 64 based on their score in the round. Sayami Matsushita had the highest score of the round with 165.

The first big surprise of the round came when Tshering Chhoden of Bhutan, who had been ranked 54th, defeated 11th-ranked Lin Sang of China. This set Chhoden up for a round of 32 match with 43rd-ranked Reena Kumari of India, who had also won in an upset. One archer from the top ten, Natalia Valeeva of Italy, lost in the first round, to 56th-ranked Jasmin Figueroa of the Philippines.

Perhaps the most exciting match of the day was between Małgorzata Sobieraj and Thin Thin Khaing, who tied with 151. Each archer shot a 9 on the first tie-breaking arrow and another 9 on the second. When the third tie-breaker resulted in an 8 for each archer, it was not possible to separate the two archers, even by measuring the distance to the centre of the target. It was only the second time in Olympic history that a fourth arrow was required to separate two archers, the first having been in Atlanta. Sobieraj's fourth arrow was better, giving her the win.

Round of 32

Held on 17 August, the second round of elimination, like the first, was a head-to-head competition in which each archer fired six ends of three arrows. Winners advanced to the round of 16, while losers received a final rank between 17 and 32 based on their scores in the round. Yun Mi-Jin of Korea scored 173 in the round, tying the Olympic record she set at the 2000 Summer Olympics.

52nd-ranked Kirstin Jean Lewis pulled off her second upset of the tournament, defeating 20th-ranked Sumangala Sharma to become the lowest ranked archer to advance. Jennifer Nichols, ranked 19th, was the only other archer to win an upset, against 14th-ranked Tetyana Berezhna. 4th-ranked He Ying, however, nearly became the third upset victim and the only top ten archer of the day to fall when Melissa Jennison forced a tie-breaker that He won 9–8. Tshering Chhoden, who had won a major upset in the first round, nearly pulled off another, forcing Reena Kumari into a tie-breaker, which Kumari won.

Round of 16

The third round of elimination, on 18 August, was the final one that used the 18 arrow match. Winners advanced to the quarterfinals, while the losers received final rankings between 9 and 16 depending on their score in the round. Park Sung-hyun had the highest score of the round, as the three Koreans continued to win.

The Chinese women were handed another defeat at the hands of Alison Williamson of Great Britain, who at 21st was the only archer not from the top ten to qualify for the quarterfinals. The archers from Chinese Taipei both continued into the quarterfinals, as did Evangelia Psarra of Greece.

Quarterfinals

With 8 archers left, the quarterfinal matches on 18 August consisted of each archer firing four ends of three arrows. Winners advanced to the semifinals while the losers received final rankings between 5 and 8. The highest score of the round again was notched by Park Sung-hyun, with 111 points.

Alison Williamson continued a great run, defeating 4th-ranked He Ying to advance to the semifinals. He missed the target with two arrows, but would have needed to score perfect 10s on each of those arrows to even tie Williamson and force a tie-breaker. Park Sung-hyun easily defeated Evangelia Psarra, scoring no less than 27 in any end of three arrows. In two matches between Korean archers and archers from Chinese Taipei, Yun Mi-Jin was the only Korean to lose so far in the women's competition, falling to Yuan Shu Chi. Lee Sung Jin, however, was able to come from behind to defeat Wu Hui Ju to keep Korea in contention for two medals.

Semifinals

With only four archers left, the semifinals featured 12-arrow matches. The two winners faced each other in the gold medal match, while the losers of the semifinals faced off for the bronze medal. For the third round in a row, Park Sung-hyun posted the high score, this time with a 110.

Lee Sung Jin and Yuan Shu Chi were the first two archers to compete. The first end resulted in a tie at 27. Lee began to pull away in the second end, scoring 26 to Shu's 24. In each of the third and fourth ends, Lee increased his lead, finishing with a safe 6-point victory to advance to the final. Park and Alison Williamson were next. Williamson's surprising run for gold came to a crash, as Park continued to be nearly perfect. Once again, Park did not score lower than 27 in any end of three arrows, dominating each end and advancing to face fellow Korean Lee in the finals.

Bronze medal match

The bronze medal match pitted Yuan Shu Chi, who had started with a 6th place in the ranking round, against Alison Williamson, who had started at 21st. Each archer fired four ends of three arrows, with the winner receiving a bronze medal while the loser would go home with a 4th-place finish and no medal.

The first end was a good one for both archers, with Yuan scoring a 10 and two 9s while Williamson matched the score with two 10s and an 8. Yuan kept up the pace with another 28 in the second end, as Williamson faltered slightly and dropped 3 points behind with a 25. Williamson caught up in the third end, however, with a 27 to Yuan's 25. Yuan took the lead again with the first arrow of the last end, but again Williamson brought it back to a tie with the second arrow. With the score tied and one arrow remaining, Williamson shot an 8 to Yuan's 7, claiming the bronze medal.

Final

The women's gold medal match pitted two Koreans against each other. The two had dominated the competition from the beginning, with Park Sung-hyun placing 1st in the ranking round and Lee Sung Jin placing 2nd.

In the first end, Park shot a rare 26, breaking a long string of ends no lower than 27. Lee matched the score, then hit a perfect 30 in the second end. Park returned to form in the second end with a 27, but this still left her 3 points behind. Park continued to build on her scores with a 28 in the third end, bringing the match to 2 points when Lee shot a 27. The fourth end was Park's best of the match while it was Lee's worst, as Park reversed the deficit with a 29–25 final end to take the gold, 110–108. Lee received a silver medal.
