= 2003 World Archery Championships – Women's individual recurve =

The women's individual recurve competition at the 2003 World Archery Championships took place in July 2003 in New York City, United States. 138 archers entered the competition. Following a qualifying 144 arrow FITA round the top 64 archers qualified for the 6-round knockout tournament, drawn according to their qualification round scores. The semi-finals and finals then took place on 20 July.

== Qualifying ==
The following archers were the leading 8 qualifiers:

1. (South Korea) Park Sung-hyun (2nd place)
2. (South Korea) Yun Mi-jin (Champion)
3. (Italy) Natalia Valeeva (Quarterfinal)
4. (China) Zhang Juanjuan (Quarterfinal)
5. (United Kingdom) Alison Williamson (2nd round)
6. (South Korea) Lee Hyun-jeong (3rd place)
7. (China) Lin Sang (2nd round)
8. (China) Xu Linlin (Quarterfinal)

== Full draw ==
=== Section 1 ===
1st round
1 | (South Korea) Park Sung-hyun | 166
64 | (Russia) Anna Pouttseva | 148
33 | (Spain) Almudena Gallardo | 149
32 | (France) Alexandra Fouace | 154
17 | (United States) Jennifer Nichols | 152
48 | (Mexico) Zelma Novelo | 145
49 | (Slovenia) Dolores Cekada | 137
16 | (Turkey) Natalia Nasaridze | 143
9 | (South Korea) Park Mi-kyung | 159
56 | (Sweden) Karin Larsson | 155
41 | (South Africa) Kirsten Lewis | 148
24 | (Georgia (country)) Khatuna Poutkaradze | 156
25 | (Greece) Evangelia Psarra | 155
40 | (Kazakhstan) Olga Pilipova | 151
57 | (Denmark) Jeannette Riis | 147
8 | (China) Xu Linlin | 150

2nd round
1 | (South Korea) Park Sung-hyun | 167
32 | (France) Alexandra Fouace | 160
17 | (United States) Jennifer Nichols | 164
16 | (Turkey) Natalia Nasaridze | 162
9 | (South Korea) Park Mi-kyung | 156
24 | (Georgia (country)) Khatuna Poutkaradze | 158
25 | (Greece) Evangelia Psarra | 161
8 | (China) Xu Linlin | 168

3rd round
1 | (South Korea) Park Sung-hyun | 170
17 | (United States) Jennifer Nichols | 165
24 | (Georgia (country)) Khatuna Poutkaradze | 158
8 | (China) Xu Linlin | 158*

Quarterfinal
1 | (South Korea) Park Sung-hyun | 115
8 | (China) Xu Linlin | 97

=== Section 2 ===
1st round
5 | (United Kingdom) Alison Williamson | 155
60 | (France) Fabienne Bourdon | 147
37 | (Japan) Sayoko Kawauchi | 156
28 | (Russia) Margarita Galinovskaya | 158
21 | (Chinese Taipei) Yuan Shu-chi | 157
44 | (Chinese Taipei) Tsai Ching-wen | 155
53 | (Poland) Iwona Marcinkiewicz | 154
12 | (Ukraine) Nataliya Burdeyna | 160
13 | (Russia) Elena Dostai | 162
52 | (Chinese Taipei) Peng Shin-hui | 154
45 | (Belarus) Katsiaryna Muliuk | 149
20 | (Poland) Małgorzata Sobieraj | 153
29 | (Sweden) Petra Ericsson | 153
36 | (Germany) Cornelia Pfohl | 147
61 | (Malaysia) Shamini Ganesan | 132
4 | (China) Zhang Juanjuan | 156

2nd round
5 | (United Kingdom) Alison Williamson | 154
28 | (Russia) Margarita Galinovskaya | 162
21 | (Chinese Taipei) Yuan Shu-chi | 153
12 | (Ukraine) Nataliya Burdeyna | 149
13 | (Russia) Elena Dostai | 161
20 | (Poland) Małgorzata Sobieraj | 159
29 | (Sweden) Petra Ericsson | 157
4 | (China) Zhang Juanjuan | 159

3rd round
28 | (Russia) Margarita Galinovskaya | 156
21 | (Chinese Taipei) Yuan Shu-chi | 155
13 | (Russia) Elena Dostai | 160
4 | (China) Zhang Juanjuan | 164

Quarterfinal
28 | (Russia) Margarita Galinovskaya | 110
4 | (China) Zhang Juanjuan | 109

=== Section 3 ===
1st round
3 | (Italy) Natalia Valeeva | 157
62 | (France) Aurore Trayan | 156
35 | (Canada) Marie-Pier Beaudet | 144
30 | (France) Bérengère Schuh | 154
19 | (Ukraine) Tetyana Dorokhova | 160
46 | (Japan) Yukari Kawasaki | 148
51 | (United States) Kathleen Loesch | 155
14 | (India) Reena Kumari | 151
11 | (China) Guo Dan | 154
54 | (India) Bheigyabati Chanu | 136
43 | (Canada) Anna Mozhar | 143
22 | (India) Dola Banerjee | 149
27 | (Poland) Justyna Mospinek | 152*
38 | (Greece) Elpida Romantzi | 152
59 | (Chinese Taipei) Tai Jui-hsien | 155
6 | (South Korea) Lee Hyun-jeong | 160

2nd round
3 | (Italy) Natalia Valeeva | 158
30 | (France) Bérengère Schuh | 155
19 | (Ukraine) Tetyana Dorokhova | 165
51 | (United States) Kathleen Loesch | 151
11 | (China) Guo Dan | 156
22 | (India) Dola Banerjee | 160
27 | (Poland) Justyna Mospinek | 148
6 | (South Korea) Lee Hyun-jeong | 157

3rd round
3 | (Italy) Natalia Valeeva | 163
19 | (Ukraine) Tetyana Dorokhova | 152
22 | (India) Dola Banerjee | 156
6 | (South Korea) Lee Hyun-jeong | 161

Quarterfinal
3 | (Italy) Natalia Valeeva | 105
6 | (South Korea) Lee Hyun-jeong | 109

=== Section 4 ===
1st round
7 | (China) Lin Sang | 153
58 | (Kazakhstan) Victoria Beloslyudtseva | 145
39 | (Turkey) Derya Sarialtin | 145
26 | (United Kingdom) Helen Palmer | 159
23 | (India) Chekrovolu Swuro | 151
42 | (Ukraine) Kateryna Palekha | 162
55 | (Germany) Anja Hitzler | 145
10 | (Mexico) Erika Reyes | 155
15 | (Japan) Sayami Matsushita | 150
50 | (Australia) Jade Beatty | 153
47 | (Germany) Wiebke Nulle | 130
18 | (Ukraine) Yulia Lobzhenidze | 155
31 | (United Kingdom) Lana Needham | 142
34 | (Russia) Natalia Bolotova | 154
63 | (Georgia (country)) Kristina Esebua | 151
2 | (South Korea) Yun Mi-jin | 154

2nd round
7 | (China) Lin Sang | 155
26 | (United Kingdom) Helen Palmer | 160
42 | (Ukraine) Kateryna Palekha | 160
10 | (Mexico) Erika Reyes | 155
50 | (Australia) Jade Beatty | 153
18 | (Ukraine) Yulia Lobzhenidze | 159
34 | (Russia) Natalia Bolotova | 152
2 | (South Korea) Yun Mi-jin | 163

3rd round
26 | (United Kingdom) Helen Palmer | 156
42 | (Ukraine) Kateryna Palekha | 160
18 | (Ukraine) Yulia Lobzhenidze | 159
2 | (South Korea) Yun Mi-jin | 164

Quarterfinal
42 | (Ukraine) Kateryna Palekha | 103
2 | (South Korea) Yun Mi-jin | 114

== Finals ==
Quarterfinals
1 | (South Korea) Park Sung-hyun | 115
8 | (China) Xu Linlin | 97
28 | (Russia) Margarita Galinovskaya | 110
4 | (China) Zhang Juanjuan | 109
3 | (Italy) Natalia Valeeva | 105
6 | (South Korea) Lee Hyun-jeong | 109
42 | (Ukraine) Kateryna Palekha | 103
2 | (South Korea) Yun Mi-jin | 114

Semifinals
1 | (South Korea) Park Sung-hyun | 111
28 | (Russia) Margarita Galinovskaya | 104
6 | (South Korea) Lee Hyun-jeong | 107
2 | (South Korea) Yun Mi-jin | 107*

Finals
1 | (South Korea) Park Sung-hyun | 111
2 | (South Korea) Yun Mi-jin | 116
Third place
28 | (Russia) Margarita Galinovskaya | 102
6 | (South Korea) Lee Hyun-jeong | 107
