= Poland at the 2004 Summer Olympics =

- IOC code: POL
- NOC: Polish Olympic Committee
- Website: www.pkol.pl (in Polish)

in Athens
- Competitors: 194 in 21 sports
- Flag bearer: Bartosz Kizierowski
- Medals Ranked 23rd: Gold 3 Silver 2 Bronze 5 Total 10

Summer Olympics appearances (overview)
- 1924; 1928; 1932; 1936; 1948; 1952; 1956; 1960; 1964; 1968; 1972; 1976; 1980; 1984; 1988; 1992; 1996; 2000; 2004; 2008; 2012; 2016; 2020; 2024; 2028

Other related appearances
- Russian Empire (1900, 1912); Austria (1908–1912)

Poland competed at the 2004 Summer Olympics in Athens, Greece, from 13 to 29 August 2004. This was the nation's eighteenth appearance at the Summer Olympics, except the 1984 Summer Olympics in Los Angeles, because of the Soviet boycott. The Polish Olympic Committee (Polish: Polski Komitet Olimpijski, PKO) sent a total of 194 athletes to the Games, 132 men and 62 women, to compete in 21 sports. Men's volleyball was the only team-based sport in which Poland had its representation in these Olympic Games. There was only a single competitor in women's taekwondo.

The Polish team featured six defending Olympic champions from Sydney: race walker Robert Korzeniowski, rifle shooter Renata Mauer-Różańska, rowing pair Tomasz Kucharski and Robert Sycz, and hammer throwers Kamila Skolimowska, and Szymon Ziółkowski. Greco-Roman wrestler and 1996 Olympic champion Ryszard Wolny and sprint canoeist Michał Śliwiński (previously competed for the Soviet Union, Unified Team, and Ukraine) had made their fifth Olympic appearance as the most sophisticated athletes of the team. Show jumper Grzegorz Kubiak, aged 41, was the oldest athlete of the team, while rhythmic gymnast Martyna Dąbkowska was the youngest at age 15. Swimming star Bartosz Kizierowski, who finished fifth in Sydney four years earlier in the men's 50 m freestyle, became the nation's flag bearer in the opening ceremony.

Poland left Athens with a total of ten medals, three golds, two silver, and five bronze, the lowest in Summer Olympic history since 1956. Seven of these medals were dominated by women, who constituted less than a third of all Polish athletes at these Games. Among the nation's medalists, two of them climbed the Olympic podium for the first time: Anna Rogowska, who beat her teammate Monika Pyrek to take home the bronze in women's pole vault, and Otylia Jędrzejczak, who became the most decorated Polish athlete at these Games with three medals, including the nation's first gold in swimming. Kucharski and Sycz managed to repeat their golden streak in the men's double sculls, while Korzeniowski ended an illustrious Olympic career with a historic milestone as the first athlete to defend his Olympic title in men's 50 km race walk for the third consecutive time.

== Medalists ==
Medal	Name	Sport	Event	Date
Gold	Otylia Jędrzejczak	Swimming	Women's 200 m butterfly	August 18
Gold	Tomasz Kucharski; Robert Sycz	Rowing	Men's lightweight double sculls	August 22
Gold	Robert Korzeniowski	Athletics	Men's 50 km walk	August 27
Silver	Otylia Jędrzejczak	Swimming	Women's 400 m freestyle	August 15
Silver	Otylia Jędrzejczak	Swimming	Women's 100 m butterfly	August 15
Bronze	Sylwia Gruchała	Fencing	Women's foil	August 18
Bronze	Mateusz Kusznierewicz	Sailing	Finn class	August 21
Bronze	Agata Wróbel	Weightlifting	Women's +75 kg	August 21
Bronze	Anna Rogowska	Athletics	Women's pole vault	August 24
Bronze	Aneta Pastuszka; Beata Sokołowska-Kulesza	Canoeing	Women's K-2 500 m	August 28

Medals by sport
Sport	1st place, gold medalist(s)	2nd place, silver medalist(s)	3rd place, bronze medalist(s)	Total
Swimming	1	2	0	3
Athletics	1	0	1	2
Rowing	1	0	0	1
Canoeing	0	0	1	1
Fencing	0	0	1	1
Sailing	0	0	1	1
Weightlifting	0	0	1	1
Total	3	2	5	10

== Archery ==
Four Polish archers qualified each for the men's and women's individual archery, and a spot for the women's team.

Athlete	Event	Ranking round		Round of 64	Round of 32	Round of 16	Quarterfinals	Semifinals	Final / BM	
Athlete	Event	Score	Seed	Opposition Score	Opposition Score	Opposition Score	Opposition Score	Opposition Score	Opposition Score	Rank
Jacek Proć	Men's individual	657	23	Hristov (BUL); L 132–133	Did not advance					
Iwona Marcinkiewicz	Women's individual	628	28	Kawasaki (JPN); W 119–106	Zhang Jj (CHN); L 157–166	Did not advance				
Justyna Mospinek	Women's individual	657	7	Sarduy (CUB); W 162–145	Beloslydtseva (KAZ); W 163–155	Wu H-J (TPE); L 151–160	Did not advance			
Małgorzata Sobieraj	Women's individual	628	27	Khaing (MYA); W 151 (35)–151 (33)	Yuan S-C (TPE) (6); L 149–158	Did not advance				
Iwona Marcinkiewicz; Justyna Mospinek; Małgorzata Sobieraj	Women's team	1913	4	—N/a		France; L 224–226	Did not advance			

== Athletics ==
Polish athletes have so far achieved qualifying standards in the following athletics events (up to a maximum of 3 athletes in each event at the 'A' Standard, and 1 at the 'B' Standard).

Key

- Note–Ranks given for track events are within the athlete's heat only
- Q = Qualified for the next round
- q = Qualified for the next round as a fastest loser or, in field events, by position without achieving the qualifying target
- NR = National record
- N/A = Round not applicable for the event
- Bye = Athlete not required to compete in round

Men
Track & road events

Athlete	Event	Heat		Quarterfinal		Semifinal		Final	
Athlete	Event	Result	Rank	Result	Rank	Result	Rank	Result	Rank
Michał Bartoszak	Marathon	—N/a						2:20:20	37
Łukasz Chyła	100 m	10.35	2 Q	10.23	4	Did not advance			
Jakub Czaja	3000 m steeplechase	8:56.24	13	—N/a				Did not advance	
Waldemar Glinka	Marathon	—N/a						2:19:43	34
Marcin Jędrusiński	200 m	20.63	1 Q	20.55	3 Q	20.81	7	Did not advance	
Piotr Klimczak	400 m	46.23	4	—N/a		Did not advance			
Robert Korzeniowski	50 km walk	—N/a						3:38:46	1st place, gold medalist(s)
Benjamin Kuciński	20 km walk	—N/a						1:23:08	12
Roman Magdziarczyk	50 km walk	—N/a						3:48:11	6
Marek Plawgo	400 m hurdles	48.67	3 Q	—N/a		48.16	2 Q	49.00	6
Radosław Popławski	3000 m steeplechase	8:22.16	7 q	—N/a				8:17.32	12
Grzegorz Sudoł	50 km walk	—N/a						3:49:09	7
Marcin Urbaś	200 m	20.71	3 Q	DNF		Did not advance			
Tomasz Ścigaczewski	110 m hurdles	DNS		Did not advance					
Jan Zakrzewski	3000 m steeplechase	8:23.72	6	—N/a				Did not advance	
Łukasz Chyła; Marcin Jędrusiński; Zbigniew Tulin; Marcin Urbaś	4 × 100 m relay	38.47	2 Q	—N/a				38.54	5
Piotr Klimczak; Marcin Marciniszyn; Marek Plawgo; Piotr Rysiukiewicz	4 × 400 m relay	3:03.69	5	—N/a				Did not advance	

Field events

Athlete	Event	Qualification		Final	
Athlete	Event	Distance	Position	Distance	Position
Adam Kolasa	Pole vault	5.30	=31	Did not advance	
Tomasz Majewski	Shot put	19.55	18	Did not advance	
Grzegorz Sposób	High jump	2.20	=20	Did not advance	
Robert Wolski	High jump	2.20	=25	Did not advance	
Szymon Ziółkowski	Hammer throw	76.17	14	Did not advance	

Women
Track & road events

Athlete	Event	Heat		Quarterfinal		Semifinal		Final	
Athlete	Event	Result	Rank	Result	Rank	Result	Rank	Result	Rank
Lidia Chojecka	1500 m	4:06.13	6 q	—N/a		4:04.83	3 Q	3:59.27	6
Monika Drybulska	Marathon	—N/a						DNF	
Anna Jakubczak	1500 m	4:06.37	4 Q	—N/a		4:06.77	2 Q	4:00.15	7
Wioletta Janowska	1500 m	4:06.91	3 Q	—N/a		4:11.41	11	Did not advance	
Anna Jesień	400 m hurdles	56.03	4	—N/a		Did not advance			
Sylwia Korzeniowska	20 km walk	—N/a						1:33:06	21
Anna Pacholak	200 m	23.00	6 q	23.35	6	Did not advance			
Grażyna Prokopek	400 m	51.29	3 Q	—N/a		51.96	8	Did not advance	
Małgorzata Pskit	400 m hurdles	54.75	1 Q	—N/a		55.24	6	Did not advance	
Małgorzata Sobańska	Marathon	—N/a						2:36:43	17
Grażyna Syrek	Marathon	—N/a						2:47:26	41
Aurelia Trywiańska	110 m hurdles	13.01	3	—N/a		Did not advance			
Monika Bejnar; Grażyna Prokopek; Małgorzata Pskit; Zuzanna Radecka	4 × 400 m relay	3:25.05	3 Q	—N/a				3:25.22	5

Field events

Athlete	Event	Qualification		Final	
Athlete	Event	Distance	Position	Distance	Position
Barbara Madejczyk	Javelin throw	61.18	9 Q	58.22	12
Wioletta Potępa	Discus throw	60.50	16	Did not advance	
Monika Pyrek	Pole vault	4.45	1 Q	4.55	4
Anna Rogowska	Pole vault	4.45	3 Q	4.70	3rd place, bronze medalist(s)
Kamila Skolimowska	Hammer throw	68.66	10 Q	72.57	5
Joanna Wiśniewska	Discus throw	61.48	11 q	60.74	10
Krystyna Zabawska	Shot put	18.61	7 Q	18.64	5
Liliana Zagacka	Triple jump	13.59	29	Did not advance	

Combined events – Heptathlon

Athlete	Event	100H	HJ	SP	200 m	LJ	JT	800 m	Final	Rank
Magdalena Szczepańska	Result	14.41	1.76	13.79	25.29	5.98	44.80	2:13.08	6012	21
Magdalena Szczepańska	Points	921	928	780	860	843	760	920	6012	21

== Badminton ==
Athlete	Event	Round of 32	Round of 16	Quarterfinal	Semifinal	Final / BM	
Athlete	Event	Opposition Score	Opposition Score	Opposition Score	Opposition Score	Opposition Score	Rank
Przemysław Wacha	Men's singles	Wong C H (MAS); L 1–15, 5–15	Did not advance				
Michał Łogosz; Robert Mateusiak	Men's doubles	Budiarto / Kusharjanto (INA); W 15–11, 3–15, 15-8	Ha T-K / Kim D-M (KOR); L 9–15, 2–15	Did not advance			

== Boxing ==
Poland sent three boxers to Athens.

Athlete	Event	Round of 32	Round of 16	Quarterfinals	Semifinals	Final	
Athlete	Event	Opposition Result	Opposition Result	Opposition Result	Opposition Result	Opposition Result	Rank
Andrzej Rżany	Flyweight	Saweho (INA); W 25–19	Mesbahi (MAR); W 33–20	Aslanov (AZE); L 23–24	Did not advance		
Andrzej Liczik	Bantamweight	Bye	Sultonov (UZB); L RSC	Did not advance			
Aleksy Kuziemski	Light heavyweight	Shumenov (KAZ); L 22–34	Did not advance				

== Canoeing ==
=== Slalom ===
Athlete	Event	Preliminary						Semifinal		Final			
Athlete	Event	Run 1	Rank	Run 2	Rank	Total	Rank	Time	Rank	Time	Rank	Total	Rank
Krzysztof Supowicz	Men's C-1	107.26	12	109.94	12	217.20	13	Did not advance					
Mariusz Wieczorek	Men's C-1	103.14	5	98.66	2	201.80	3 Q	101.30	10	Did not advance			
Grzegorz Polaczyk	Men's K-1	97.97	11	97.49	11	195.46	12 Q	94.74	4 Q	101.83	8	196.57	7
Marcin Pochwała; Paweł Sarna	Men's C-2	113.86	7	112.79	7	226.65	7 Q	119.78	10	Did not advance			
Agnieszka Stanuch	Women's K-1	118.57	13	115.32	13	233.89	14 Q	120.73	13	Did not advance			

=== Sprint ===
Men

Athlete	Event	Heats		Semifinals		Final	
Athlete	Event	Time	Rank	Time	Rank	Time	Rank
Paweł Baumann	K-1 500 m	1:42.581	4 q	1:43.125	9	Did not advance	
Adam Seroczyński	K-1 1000 m	3:28.464	3 q	3:30.201	4	Did not advance	
Paweł Baraszkiewicz; Daniel Jędraszko	C-2 500 m	1:40.524	3 Q	Bye		1:42.046	9
Michał Śliwiński; Łukasz Woszczyński	C-2 1000 m	3:30.607	3 Q	Bye		3:44.338	5
Marek Twardowski; Adam Wysocki	K-2 500 m	1:29.069	1 Q	Bye		1:28.048	4
Dariusz Białkowski; Rafał Głażewski; Tomasz Mendelski; Adam Seroczyński	K-4 1000 m	2:55.240	3 Q	Bye		3:03.562	8

Women

Athlete	Event	Heats		Semifinals		Final	
Athlete	Event	Time	Rank	Time	Rank	Time	Rank
Aneta Pastuszka	K-1 500 m	1:53.840	2 q	DSQ		Did not advance	
Aneta Pastuszka; Beata Sokołowska-Kulesza	K-2 500 m	1:41.164	3 Q	Bye		1:40.077	3rd place, bronze medalist(s)
Małgorzata Czajczyńska; Aneta Michalak; Karolina Sadalska; Joanna Skowroń	K-4 500 m	1:31.949	1 Q	Bye		1:36.376	4

Qualification Legend: Q = Qualify to final; q = Qualify to semifinal

== Cycling ==
=== Road ===
Men

Athlete	Event	Time	Rank
Tomasz Brożyna	Road race	5:50:35	56
Dawid Krupa	Road race	6:00:25	75
Dawid Krupa	Time trial	1:03:07.05	31
Sławomir Kohut	Road race	Did not finish	
Sławomir Kohut	Time trial	1:06:19.29	35
Radosław Romanik	Road race	Did not finish	
Sylwester Szmyd	Road race	Did not finish	

Women

Athlete	Event	Time	Rank
Bogumiła Matusiak	Road race	3:31:55	42
Małgorzata Wysocka	Road race	3:25:42	27

=== Track ===
Sprint

Athlete	Event	Qualification		Round 1	Repechage 1	Round 2	Repechage 2	Quarterfinals	Semifinals	Final	
Athlete	Event	Time Speed (km/h)	Rank	Opposition Time Speed (km/h)	Opposition Time Speed (km/h)	Opposition Time Speed (km/h)	Opposition Time Speed (km/h)	Opposition Time Speed (km/h)	Opposition Time Speed (km/h)	Opposition Time Speed (km/h)	Rank
Łukasz Kwiatkowski	Men's sprint	10.462; 68.820	10	Eadie (AUS); L	Forde (BAR); Nimke (GER); L	Did not advance					
Damian Zieliński	Men's sprint	10.441; 68.958	7	Mulder (NED); W 10.863; 66.463	Bye	Edgar (GBR); W 10.848; 66.371	Bye	Wolff (GER); L, L	Did not advance	5th place final Edgar (GBR); Forde (BAR); Bourgain (FRA); L	7
Rafał Furman; Łukasz Kwiatkowski; Damian Zieliński	Men's team sprint	45.093; 59.876	9	Did not advance							

Time trial

Athlete	Event	Time	Rank
Grzegorz Krejner	Men's time trial	1:03.923	14

Keirin

Athlete	Event	1st round	Repechage	2nd round	Final
Athlete	Event	Rank	Rank	Rank	Rank
Łukasz Kwiatkowski	Men's keirin	4 R	2 Q	5 Q	7

=== Mountain biking ===
Athlete	Event	Time	Rank
Marek Galiński	Men's cross-country	2:22:14	14
Marcin Karczyński	Men's cross-country	2:26:41	24
Magdalena Sadlecka	Women's cross-country	Did not finish	
Anna Szafraniec	Women's cross-country	2:07:44	11
Maja Włoszczowska	Women's cross-country	2:02:08	6

== Equestrian ==
=== Eventing ===
Athlete	Horse	Event	Dressage		Cross-country			Jumping						Total	
Athlete	Horse	Event	Dressage		Cross-country			Qualifier			Final			Total	
Athlete	Horse	Event	Penalties	Rank	Penalties	Total	Rank	Penalties	Total	Rank	Penalties	Total	Rank	Penalties	Rank
Andrzej Pasek	Dekalog	Individual	60.40	45	26.40	86.80	51	28.00	114.80	51	Did not advance			114.80	51
Kamil Rajnert	Marnego	Individual	50.80	31	24.40	75.20	40	12.00	87.20	39	Did not advance			97.20	39
Paweł Spisak	Weriusz	Individual	67.00	63	99.40	166.40	69	8.00	174.40	66	Did not advance			174.40	66
Kamil Rajnert; Andrzej Pasek; Paweł Spisak	See above	Team	178.20	11	150.20	328.40	13	48.00	376.40	12	—N/a			376.40	14

=== Show jumping ===
Athlete	Horse	Event	Qualification								Final					Total	
Athlete	Horse	Event	Round 1		Round 2			Round 3			Round A		Round B			Total	
Athlete	Horse	Event	Penalties	Rank	Penalties	Total	Rank	Penalties	Total	Rank	Penalties	Rank	Penalties	Total	Rank	Penalties	Rank
Grzegorz Kubiak	Djane des Fontenis	Individual	8	=47	12	20	=46 Q	17	37	=51 Q	24	44	Did not advance				

== Fencing ==
Men

Athlete	Event	Round of 64	Round of 32	Round of 16	Quarterfinal	Semifinal	Final / BM	
Athlete	Event	Opposition Score	Opposition Score	Opposition Score	Opposition Score	Opposition Score	Opposition Score	Rank
Rafał Sznajder	Individual sabre	Bye	Touya (FRA); W 15–14	Covaliu (ROM); L 9–15	Did not advance			

Women

Athlete	Event	Round of 32	Round of 16	Quarterfinal	Semifinal	Final / BM	
Athlete	Event	Opposition Score	Opposition Score	Opposition Score	Opposition Score	Opposition Score	Rank
Sylwia Gruchała	Individual foil	Bye	Bauer (GER); W 15–9	Badea (ROM); W 15–7	Vezzali (ITA); L 13–15	Mohamed (HUN); W 15–9	3rd place, bronze medalist(s)
Aleksandra Socha	Individual sabre	Bye	Gheorghițoaia (ROM); L 14–15	Did not advance			

== Gymnastics ==
=== Rhythmic ===
Athlete	Event	Qualification				Final			
Athlete	Event	5 ribbons	3 hoops 2 balls	Total	Rank	5 ribbons	3 hoops 2 balls	Total	Rank
Justyna Banasiak; Martyna Dąbkowska; Małgorzata Ławrynowicz; Anna Mrozińska; Aleksandra Wójcik; Aleksandra Zawistowska	Team	20.725	21.050	41.775	10	Did not advance			

== Judo ==
Six Polish judoka (four men and two women) qualified for the 2004 Summer Olympics.

Men

Athlete	Event	Round of 32	Round of 16	Quarterfinals	Semifinals	Repechage 1	Repechage 2	Repechage 3	Final / BM	
Athlete	Event	Opposition Result	Opposition Result	Opposition Result	Opposition Result	Opposition Result	Opposition Result	Opposition Result	Opposition Result	Rank
Krzysztof Wiłkomirski	−73 kg	Collett (AUS); W 0001–1001	Guilheiro (BRA); L 0011–0110	Did not advance						
Robert Krawczyk	−81 kg	Ben Saleh (LBA); W 1101–0000	Hawn (USA); W 1000–0000	Azizov (AZE); W 1001–0000	Hontyuk (UKR); L 0013–1011	Bye			Canto (BRA); L 0011–0110	5
Przemysław Matyjaszek	−90 kg	Hwang H-T (KOR); L 0000–1000	Did not advance			Hulzinga (NED); L 0001–0021	Did not advance			
Grzegorz Eitel	+100 kg	Pan S (CHN); L 0000–1001	Did not advance							

Women

Athlete	Event	Round of 32	Round of 16	Quarterfinals	Semifinals	Repechage 1	Repechage 2	Repechage 3	Final / BM	
Athlete	Event	Opposition Result	Opposition Result	Opposition Result	Opposition Result	Opposition Result	Opposition Result	Opposition Result	Opposition Result	Rank
Anna Żemła-Krajewska	−48 kg	Bye	Bruletova (RUS); W 1000–0000	Dumitru (ROM); L 0000–1000	Did not advance	Bye	Shishkina (KAZ); W 1000–0100	Karagiannopoulou (GRE); L 0000–1001	Did not advance	
Adriana Dadci	−70 kg	Pažoutová (CZE); L 0102–1111	Did not advance							

== Modern pentathlon ==
Four Polish athletes qualified to compete in the modern pentathlon event through the European and UIPM Championships.

Athlete	Event	Shooting (10 m air pistol)			Fencing (épée one touch)			Swimming (200 m freestyle)			Riding (show jumping)			Running (3000 m)			Total points	Final rank
Athlete	Event	Points	Rank	MP Points	Results	Rank	MP points	Time	Rank	MP points	Penalties	Rank	MP points	Time	Rank	MP Points	Total points	Final rank
Marcin Horbacz	Men's	181	7	1108	18–13	=6	888	2:04.43	8	1308	DNF	32	0	10:07.46	22	972	4388	32
Andrzej Stefanek	Men's	172	22	1000	16–15	=11	832	2:07.37	14	1272	616	31	584	10:03.35	18	988	4676	30
Paulina Boenisz	Women's	180	5	1096	13–18	=22	748	2:28.13	25	1144	100	17	1100	10:56.05	3	1096	5184	10
Sylwia Czwojdzińska	Women's	179	6	1084	17–14	=7	860	2:21.44	14	1224	84	16	1116	11:22.00	=18	992	5276	6

== Rowing ==
Polish rowers qualified the following boats:

Men

Athlete	Event	Heats		Repechage		Semifinals		Final	
Athlete	Event	Time	Rank	Time	Rank	Time	Rank	Time	Rank
Michał Jeliński; Adam Wojciechowski	Double sculls	7:00.38	4 R	6:17.51	4	Did not advance			
Tomasz Kucharski; Robert Sycz	Lightweight double sculls	6:21.45	2 R	6:20.90	1 SA/B	6:14.91	1 FA	6:20.93	1st place, gold medalist(s)
Mariusz Daniszewski; Jarosław Godek; Artur Rozalski; Rafał Smoliński	Four	6:30.72	2 SA/B	Bye		5:53.32	3 FA	6:22.43	6
Adam Bronikowski; Marek Kolbowicz; Adam Korol; Sławomir Kruszkowski	Quadruple sculls	5:41.98	1 SA/B	Bye		5:42.63	1 FA	5:58.94	4
Rafał Hejmej; Wojciech Gutorski; Sebastian Kosiorek; Piotr Buchalski; Mikołaj Burda; Dariusz Nowak; Michał Stawowski; Daniel Trojanowski (cox); Bogdan Zalewski	Eight	5:30.08	5 R	5:36.75	4 FB	—N/a		5:51.66	8

Women

Athlete	Event	Heats		Repechage		Semifinals		Final	
Athlete	Event	Time	Rank	Time	Rank	Time	Rank	Time	Rank
Magdalena Kemnitz; Ilona Mokronowska	Lightweight double sculls	6:51.46	2 R	6:53.74	1 SA/B	6:54.49	2 FA	7:04.48	6

Qualification Legend: FA=Final A (medal); FB=Final B (non-medal); FC=Final C (non-medal); FD=Final D (non-medal); FE=Final E (non-medal); FF=Final F (non-medal); SA/B=Semifinals A/B; SC/D=Semifinals C/D; SE/F=Semifinals E/F; R=Repechage

== Sailing ==
Polish sailors have qualified one boat for each of the following events.

Men

Athlete	Event	Race											Net points	Final rank
Athlete	Event	1	2	3	4	5	6	7	8	9	10	M*	Net points	Final rank
Przemysław Miarczyński	Mistral	6	1	1	15	10	5	9	16	2	7	~~20~~	73	5
Mateusz Kusznierewicz	Finn	3	1	6	4	11	~~OCS~~	17	1	7	2	1	53	3rd place, bronze medalist(s)
Tomasz Jakubiak; Tomasz Stańczyk	470	24	11	~~25~~	2	13	25	7	14	22	18	21	157	21

Women

Athlete	Event	Race											Net points	Final rank
Athlete	Event	1	2	3	4	5	6	7	8	9	10	M*	Net points	Final rank
Zofia Klepacka	Mistral	8	2	16	7	6	15	~~20~~	19	20	4	16	113	12
Monika Bronicka	Europe	16	18	16	12	~~22~~	14	21	12	18	15	20	162	21

Open

Athlete	Event	Race																Net points	Final rank
Athlete	Event	1	2	3	4	5	6	7	8	9	10	11	12	13	14	15	M*	Net points	Final rank
Maciej Grabowski	Laser	8	23	~~30~~	20	3	3	8	16	10	20	—N/a					14	125	11
Marcin Czajkowski; Krzysztof Kierkowski	49er	~~DSQ~~	18	16	~~OCS~~	13	15	11	10	18	9	13	18	3	13	16	17	190	18

M = Medal race; OCS = On course side of the starting line; DSQ = Disqualified; DNF = Did not finish; DNS= Did not start; RDG = Redress given

== Shooting ==
Five Polish shooters (two men and three women) qualified to compete in the following events:

Men

Athlete	Event	Qualification		Final	
Athlete	Event	Points	Rank	Points	Rank
Andrzej Głyda	Skeet	119	=21	Did not advance	
Wojciech Knapik	10 m air pistol	580	=11	Did not advance	
Wojciech Knapik	50 m pistol	536	39	Did not advance	

Women

Athlete	Event	Qualification		Final	
Athlete	Event	Points	Rank	Points	Rank
Sylwia Bogacka	50 m rifle 3 positions	573	=17	Did not advance	
Renata Mauer-Różańska	10 m air rifle	396	=9	Did not advance	
Renata Mauer-Różańska	50 m rifle 3 positions	573	=17	Did not advance	
Agnieszka Staroń	10 m air rifle	394	=14	Did not advance	

== Swimming ==
Polish swimmers earned qualifying standards in the following events (up to a maximum of 2 swimmers in each event at the A-standard time, and 1 at the B-standard time):

Men

Athlete	Event	Heat		Semifinal		Final	
Athlete	Event	Time	Rank	Time	Rank	Time	Rank
Łukasz Drzewiński	200 m freestyle	1:51.90	30	Did not advance			
Łukasz Drzewiński	400 m freestyle	3:50.97	14	—N/a		Did not advance	
Bartosz Kizierowski	50 m freestyle	22.26	3 Q	22.22	9	Did not advance	
Paweł Korzeniowski	1500 m freestyle	15:11.62	9	—N/a		Did not advance	
Paweł Korzeniowski	200 m butterfly	1:57.45	3 Q	1:56.40	3 Q	1:56.00 NR	4
Adam Mania	100 m backstroke	56.20	23	Did not advance			
Adam Mania	200 m backstroke	2:03.73	27	Did not advance			
Przemysław Stańczyk	400 m freestyle	3:49.22	9	—N/a		Did not advance	

Women

Athlete	Event	Heat		Semifinal		Final	
Athlete	Event	Time	Rank	Time	Rank	Time	Rank
Paulina Barzycka	100 m freestyle	56.20	19	Did not advance			
Paulina Barzycka	200 m freestyle	1:59.52	3 Q	1:59.10	5 Q	1:58.62	4
Otylia Jędrzejczak	400 m freestyle	4:07.11	2 Q	—N/a		4:05.84 NR	2nd place, silver medalist(s)
Otylia Jędrzejczak	100 m butterfly	57.84	2 Q	58.10	3 Q	57.84	2nd place, silver medalist(s)
Otylia Jędrzejczak	200 m butterfly	2:09.64	1 Q	2:08.84	3 Q	2:06.05	1st place, gold medalist(s)

== Table tennis ==
Two Polish table tennis players qualified for the following events.

Athlete	Event	Round 1	Round 2	Round 3	Round 4	Quarterfinals	Semifinals	Final / BM	
Athlete	Event	Opposition Result	Opposition Result	Opposition Result	Opposition Result	Opposition Result	Opposition Result	Opposition Result	Rank
Lucjan Błaszczyk	Men's singles	Bye	He Zw (ESP); W 4–3	Samsonov (BLR); L 2–4	Did not advance				
Tomasz Krzeszewski	Men's singles	Hoyama (BRA); W 4–0	Roßkopf (GER); L 1–4	Did not advance					
Lucjan Błaszczyk; Tomasz Krzeszewski	Men's doubles	Bye			Chiang P-L / Chuang C-Y (TPE); W 4–2	Chen Q / Ma L (CHN); L 1–4	Did not advance		

== Taekwondo ==
Poland has qualified a single taekwondo jin.

Athlete	Event	Round of 16	Quarterfinals	Semifinals	Repechage 1	Repechage 2	Final / BM	
Athlete	Event	Opposition Result	Opposition Result	Opposition Result	Opposition Result	Opposition Result	Opposition Result	Rank
Aleksandra Uścińska	Women's −57 kg	Reyes (ESP); L 2–11	Did not advance					

== Tennis ==
Poland nominated two male tennis players to compete in the tournament.

Athlete	Event	Round of 32	Round of 16	Quarterfinals	Semifinals	Final / BM	
Athlete	Event	Opposition Score	Opposition Score	Opposition Score	Opposition Score	Opposition Score	Rank
Mariusz Fyrstenberg; Marcin Matkowski	Men's doubles	Allegro / Federer (SUI); L 3–6, 2–6	Did not advance				

== Volleyball ==
=== Men's tournament ===
Roster

The following is the Polish roster in the men's volleyball tournament of the 2004 Summer Olympics.

Head coach: Stanisław Gościniak

№	Name	Date of birth	Height	Weight	Spike	Block	2004 club
1	Andrzej Stelmach	15 August 1972	2.00 m (6 ft 7 in)	98 kg (216 lb)	330 cm (130 in)	320 cm (130 in)	(Poland) Skra Bełchatów
3	Piotr Gruszka	8 March 1977	2.06 m (6 ft 9 in)	102 kg (225 lb)	352 cm (139 in)	325 cm (128 in)	(France) Tourcoing LM
5	Paweł Zagumny (c)	18 October 1977	2.00 m (6 ft 7 in)	88 kg (194 lb)	336 cm (132 in)	317 cm (125 in)	(Poland) AZS UWM Olsztyn
6	Dawid Murek	24 July 1977	1.96 m (6 ft 5 in)	94 kg (207 lb)	341 cm (134 in)	325 cm (128 in)	(Greece) Panathinaikos V.C.
8	Krzysztof Ignaczak (L)	15 May 1972	1.88 m (6 ft 2 in)	86 kg (190 lb)	330 cm (130 in)	315 cm (124 in)	(Poland) Skra Bełchatów
11	Łukasz Kadziewicz	20 September 1980	2.06 m (6 ft 9 in)	84 kg (185 lb)	350 cm (140 in)	328 cm (129 in)	(Poland) AZS UWM Olsztyn
12	Radosław Rybak	25 March 1973	1.95 m (6 ft 5 in)	90 kg (200 lb)	356 cm (140 in)	330 cm (130 in)	(Poland) Jastrzębski Węgiel
13	Sebastian Świderski	26 June 1977	1.93 m (6 ft 4 in)	88 kg (194 lb)	354 cm (139 in)	325 cm (128 in)	(Italy) Umbria Volley
14	Piotr Gabrych	5 July 1972	1.97 m (6 ft 6 in)	95 kg (209 lb)	342 cm (135 in)	318 cm (125 in)	(Poland) Jastrzębski Węgiel
16	Arkadiusz Gołaś	10 May 1981	2.01 m (6 ft 7 in)	82 kg (181 lb)	365 cm (144 in)	342 cm (135 in)	(Poland) AZS Częstochowa
17	Michał Bąkiewicz	22 March 1981	1.96 m (6 ft 5 in)	79 kg (174 lb)	338 cm (133 in)	324 cm (128 in)	(Poland) Skra Bełchatów
18	Robert Szczerbaniuk	29 May 1977	1.99 m (6 ft 6 in)	89 kg (196 lb)	350 cm (140 in)	327 cm (129 in)	(Poland) Zaksa Kędzierzyn-Koźle

Group play

Pos	Team	Pld	W	L	Pts	SW	SL	SR	SPW	SPL	SPR	Qualification
1	Serbia and Montenegro	5	4	1	9	12	6	2.000	427	398	1.073	Quarterfinals
2	Greece	5	3	2	8	12	9	1.333	475	454	1.046	Quarterfinals
3	Argentina	5	3	2	8	12	9	1.333	471	457	1.031	Quarterfinals
4	Poland	5	3	2	8	10	9	1.111	422	419	1.007	Quarterfinals
5	France	5	2	3	7	8	10	0.800	405	394	1.028	
6	Tunisia	5	0	5	5	4	15	0.267	373	451	0.827	

Source: FIVB

15 August 2004; 09:00	Serbia and Montenegro	0–3	Poland	Peace and Friendship Stadium; Attendance: 2,000; Referees: Bela Hobor (HUN), Luciano Gaspari (ITA)
15 August 2004; 09:00	(21–25, 17–25, 16–25) result			Peace and Friendship Stadium; Attendance: 2,000; Referees: Bela Hobor (HUN), Luciano Gaspari (ITA)

17 August 2004; 19:30	Greece	3–1	Poland	Peace and Friendship Stadium; Attendance: 8,600; Referees: Luciano Gaspari (ITA), Jarmo Salonen (FIN)
17 August 2004; 19:30	(21–25, 25–18, 25–21, 25–20) result			Peace and Friendship Stadium; Attendance: 8,600; Referees: Luciano Gaspari (ITA), Jarmo Salonen (FIN)

19 August 2004; 14:00	Poland	0–3	France	Peace and Friendship Stadium; Attendance: 5,230; Referees: Jarmo Salonen (FIN), Luciano Gaspari (ITA)
19 August 2004; 14:00	(15–25, 18–25, 17–25) result			Peace and Friendship Stadium; Attendance: 5,230; Referees: Jarmo Salonen (FIN), Luciano Gaspari (ITA)

21 August 2004; 14:00	Tunisia	1–3	Poland	Peace and Friendship Stadium; Attendance: 4,600; Referees: Patricia Salvatore (USA), Ibrahim Al-Naama (QAT)
21 August 2004; 14:00	(18–25, 25–23, 19–25, 23–25) result			Peace and Friendship Stadium; Attendance: 4,600; Referees: Patricia Salvatore (USA), Ibrahim Al-Naama (QAT)

23 August 2004; 16:00	Poland	3–2	Argentina	Peace and Friendship Stadium; Attendance: 6,295; Referees: Kun-Tae Kim (KOR), Hiroyuki Ito (JPN)
23 August 2004; 16:00	(25–19, 25–22, 23–25, 22–25, 20–18) result			Peace and Friendship Stadium; Attendance: 6,295; Referees: Kun-Tae Kim (KOR), Hiroyuki Ito (JPN)

Quarterfinal

25 August 2004; 22:25	Poland	0–3	Brazil	Peace and Friendship Stadium; Attendance: 4,150; Referees: Ning Wang (CHN), Fernando Nava (MEX)
25 August 2004; 22:25	(22–25, 25–27, 18–25) result			Peace and Friendship Stadium; Attendance: 4,150; Referees: Ning Wang (CHN), Fernando Nava (MEX)

== Weightlifting ==
Seven Polish weightlifters qualified for the following events:

Men

Athlete	Event	Snatch		Clean & Jerk		Total	Rank
Athlete	Event	Result	Rank	Result	Rank	Total	Rank
Krzysztof Szramiak	−77 kg	160	=5	~~182.5~~	DNF	160	DNF
Tadeusz Drzazga	−94 kg	170	=12	200	14	370	13
Robert Dołęga	−105 kg	~~180~~	DNF	—	—	—	DNF
Grzegorz Kleszcz	+105 kg	190	=9	225	=9	415	10
Paweł Najdek	+105 kg	190	=9	240	=4	430	6

Women

Athlete	Event	Snatch		Clean & Jerk		Total	Rank
Athlete	Event	Result	Rank	Result	Rank	Total	Rank
Aleksandra Klejnowska	−58 kg	97.5	5	122.5	=5	220	5
Agata Wróbel	+75 kg	130	=1	160	3	290	3rd place, bronze medalist(s)

== Wrestling ==
Key:

- VT - Victory by Fall.
- PP - Decision by Points - the loser with technical points.
- PO - Decision by Points - the loser without technical points.

Men's freestyle

Athlete	Event	Elimination Pool			Quarterfinal	Semifinal	Final / BM	
Athlete	Event	Opposition Result	Opposition Result	Rank	Opposition Result	Opposition Result	Opposition Result	Rank
Krystian Brzozowski	−74 kg	Paslar (BUL); W 3–1 ^{PP}	Osmanov (MKD); W 3–0 ^{PO}	1 Q	Bye	Saitiev (RUS); L 0–3 ^{PO}	Fundora (CUB); L 1–3 ^{PP}	4
Bartłomiej Bartnicki	−96 kg	Valach (AUT); W 3–1 ^{PP}	Cormier (USA); L 1–3 ^{PP}	2	Did not advance			11
Marek Garmulewicz	−120 kg	Taymazov (UZB); L 0–4 ^{ST}	Cheema (IND); W 3–1 ^{PP}	2	Did not advance			11

Men's Greco-Roman

Athlete	Event	Elimination Pool				Quarterfinal	Semifinal	Final / BM	
Athlete	Event	Opposition Result	Opposition Result	Opposition Result	Rank	Opposition Result	Opposition Result	Opposition Result	Rank
Dariusz Jabłoński	−55 kg	Mamedaliyev (RUS); L 0–3 ^{PO}	Khatri (IND); W 3–0 ^{PO}	—N/a	2	Did not advance			15
Włodzimierz Zawadzki	−60 kg	Jung J-H (KOR); L 1–3 ^{PP}	Rahimov (AZE); L 1–3 ^{PP}	—N/a	3	Did not advance			16
Ryszard Wolny	−66 kg	Mansurov (AZE); L 1–3 ^{PP}	Marén (CUB); L 0–3 ^{PO}	—N/a	3	Did not advance			17
Radosław Truszkowski	−74 kg	Azcuy (CUB); L 0–3 ^{PO}	Choi D-H (KOR); L 1–3 ^{PP}	—N/a	3	Did not advance			18
Marek Sitnik	−96 kg	Gaber (EGY); L 0–3 ^{PO}	Mambetov (KAZ); W 3–0 ^{PO}	Koutsioumpas (GRE); L 1–3 ^{PP}	3	Did not advance			10
Marek Mikulski	−120 kg	Mureiko (BUL); L 0–3 ^{PO}	Mizgaitis (LTU); L 0–3 ^{PO}	Gardner (USA); L 0–3 ^{PO}	4	Did not advance			20

== See also ==
- Poland at the 2004 Summer Paralympics
