= 2003 World Archery Championships – Women's team recurve =

The women's team recurve competition at the 2003 World Archery Championships took place in July 2003 in New York City, United States. 138 archers took part in the women's recurve qualification round with no more than 4 from each country, and the 16 teams of 3 archers with the highest cumulative totals (out of a possible 32) qualified for the 4-round knockout round, drawn according to their qualification round scores.

== Seeds ==
Seedings were based on the combined total of the team members' qualification scores in the individual ranking rounds. The top 16 teams were assigned places in the draw depending on their overall ranking.

1. (South Korea) Park Sung-hyun / Yun Mi-jin / Lee Hyun-jeong (champions)
2. (China) Zhang Juanjuan / Lin Sang / Xu Linlin (quarterfinal)
3. (United Kingdom) Alison Williamson / Helen Palmer / Lana Needham (quarterfinal)
4. (Ukraine) Nataliya Burdeyna / Yulia Lobzhenidze / Tetyana Dorokhova (3rd place)
5. (India) Reena Kumari / Dola Banerjee / Chekrovolu Swuro (quarterfinal)
6. (Russia) Elena Dostai / Margarita Galinovskaya / Natalia Bolotova (1st round)
7. (Japan) Sayami Matsushita / Sayoko Kawauchi / Yukari Kawasaki (2nd place)
8. (Poland) Małgorzata Sobieraj / Justyna Mospinek / Iwona Marcinkiewicz (quarterfinal)
9. (Chinese Taipei) Yuan Shu-chi / Tsai Ching-wen / Peng Shin-hui (1st round)
10. (Mexico) Erika Reyes Evaristo / Zelma Novelo Breton / Marisol Breton Lopez (1st round)
11. (France) Bérengère Schuh / Alexandra Fouace / Fabienne Bourdon (4th place)
12. (Turkey) Natalia Nasaridze / Derya Sarialtin / Gulcan Cakir (1st round)
13. (Germany) Cornelia Pfohl / Wiebke Nulle / Anja Hitzler (4th place)
14. (Canada) Marie-Pier Beaudet / Anna Mozhar / Rachel Savage (2nd place)
15. (United States) Jennifer Nichols / Kathleen Loesch / Janet Dykman (1st round)
16. (Italy) Natalia Valeeva / Chiara Navigante / Cristina Ioriatti (1st round)

== Draw ==
1st round
1	South Korea	251
16	Italy	230
9	Chinese Taipei	237
8	Poland	241
5	India	236
12	Turkey	217
13	Germany	229
4	Ukraine	245
3	United Kingdom	236
14	Canada	216
11	France	238*
6	Russia	238
7	Japan	239
10	Mexico	231
15	United States	237
2	China	241

Quarterfinals
1	South Korea	242*
8	Poland	242
5	India	236
4	Ukraine	239
3	United Kingdom	234
11	'France	243
7	Japan	235
2	China	234

Semifinals
1	South Korea	244
4	Ukraine	223
11	France	224
7	Japan	232

Finals
1	South Korea	252
7	Japan	233
Third place
4	Ukraine	240
11	France	231
