= India at the 2004 Summer Olympics =

- IOC code: IND
- NOC: Indian Olympic Association
- Website: olympic.ind.in

in Athens
- Competitors: 73 in 14 sports
- Flag bearer: Anju Bobby George
- Medals Ranked 65th: Gold 0 Silver 1 Bronze 0 Total 1

Summer Olympics appearances (overview)
- 1900; 1904–1912; 1920; 1924; 1928; 1932; 1936; 1948; 1952; 1956; 1960; 1964; 1968; 1972; 1976; 1980; 1984; 1988; 1992; 1996; 2000; 2004; 2008; 2012; 2016; 2020; 2024

India competed at the 2004 Summer Olympics in Athens, Greece, from 13 to 29 August 2004. The Indian Olympic Association sent a total of 73 athletes, 48 men, and 28 women, to compete in 14 sports. Men's field hockey was the only team-based sport in which India had its representation in these Olympic games. As a pleasant surprise, the shooting team came successful with a silver medal, the winner being Capt. Rajyavardhan Singh Rathore. He was the first Indian to win an individual silver medal.

Several Indian athletes came close to increasing the medal haul, finishing in fourth place, including Mahesh Bhupati and Leander Paes in tennis men's doubles and Kunjarani Devi in weightlifting women's 48 kg category.

Sanamacha Chanu originally finished fourth (women's weightlifting 53 kg category), but was disqualified after being tested positive for furosemide.

== Medalists ==
Medal	Name	Sport	Event	Date
Silver	Rajyavardhan Singh Rathore	Shooting	Men's double trap	August 17

== Competitors ==
The following is the list of number of competitors participating in the Games. Note that reserves in fencing, field hockey, football, and handball are not counted as athletes:

Sports	Men	Women	Total	Events
Archery	3	3	6	4
Athletics	4	13	17	9
Badminton	2	1	3	2
Boxing	4	0	4	4
Field hockey	16	0	16	1
Judo	1	0	1	1
Rowing	1	0	1	1
Sailing	2	0	2	1
Shooting	5	3	8	5
Swimming	0	1	1	2
Table tennis	1	1	2	2
Tennis	2	0	2	1
Weightlifting	0	3	3	3
Wrestling	7	0	7	7
Total	48	25	73	43

== Archery ==
Three Indian archers qualified each for the men's and women's individual archery, and a spot each for both men's and women's teams.

Men

Athlete	Event	Ranking round		Round of 64	Round of 32	Round of 16	Quarterfinals	Semifinals	Final / BM	
Athlete	Event	Score	Seed	Opposition Score	Opposition Score	Opposition Score	Opposition Score	Opposition Score	Opposition Score	Rank
Satyadev Prasad	Individual	634	48	Hamano (JPN); W 155–150	van der Hoff (NED); W 158–155	Im D-H (KOR); L 165–167	Did not advance			
Tarundeep Rai	Individual	647	32	Karageorgiou (GRE); L 143–147	Did not advance					
Majhi Sawaiyan	Individual	657	22	Wunderle (USA); L 128–145	Did not advance					
Satyadev Prasad; Tarundeep Rai; Majhi Sawaiyan	Team	1938	10	—		Australia; L 236–248	Did not advance			

Women

Athlete	Event	Ranking round		Round of 64	Round of 32	Round of 16	Quarterfinals	Semifinals	Final / BM	
Athlete	Event	Score	Seed	Opposition Score	Opposition Score	Opposition Score	Opposition Score	Opposition Score	Opposition Score	Rank
Dola Banerjee	Individual	642	13	Lewis (RSA); L 131–141	Did not advance					
Reena Kumari	Individual	620	43	Esebua (GEO); W 153–149	Chhoden (BHU); W 134 (7)–134 (4)	Yuan S-C (TPE); L 148–166	Did not advance			
Sumangala Sharma	Individual	638	20	Chen L-J (TPE); W 142–133	Lewis (RSA); L 153–157	Did not advance				
Dola Banerjee; Reena Kumari; Sumangala Sharma	Team	1900	5	—		Great Britain; W 230–228	France; L 227–228	Did not advance		

== Athletics ==
Indian athletes have so far achieved qualifying standards in the following athletics events (up to a maximum of 3 athletes in each event at the 'A' Standard, and 1 at the 'B' Standard).

Key

- Note–Ranks given for track events are within the athlete's heat only
- Q = Qualified for the next round
- q = Qualified for the next round as a fastest loser or, in field events, by position without achieving the qualifying target
- NR = National record
- N/A = Round not applicable for the event
- Bye = Athlete not required to compete in round

Men
Track & road events

Athlete	Event	Heat		Semifinal		Final	
Athlete	Event	Result	Rank	Result	Rank	Result	Rank
K. M. Binu	400 m	45.48 NR	3 q	45.97	6	Did not advance	

Field events

Athlete	Event	Qualification		Final	
Athlete	Event	Distance	Position	Distance	Position
Vikas Gowda	Discus throw	61.39	14	Did not advance	
Anil Kumar	Discus throw	NM	—	Did not advance	
Bahadur Singh	Shot put	NM	—	Did not advance	

Women
Track & road events

Athlete	Event	Heat		Quarterfinal		Semifinal		Final	
Athlete	Event	Result	Rank	Result	Rank	Result	Rank	Result	Rank
Saraswati Saha	200 m	23.43	5	Did not advance					
K. M. Beenamol; Sathi Geetha; Manjit Kaur*; Rajwinder Kaur; Chitra K. Soman	4 × 400 m relay	3:26.89 NR	3 Q	—				3:28.51	7

Field events

Athlete	Event	Qualification		Final	
Athlete	Event	Distance	Position	Distance	Position
Bobby Aloysius	High jump	1.85	=28	Did not advance	
Seema Antil	Discus throw	60.64	14	Did not advance	
Anju Bobby George	Long jump	6.69	9 Q	6.83 NR	5
Harwant Kaur	Discus throw	60.82	13	Did not advance	
Neelam Jaswant Singh	Discus throw	60.26	17	Did not advance	

Combined events – Heptathlon

Athlete	Event	100H	HJ	SP	200 m	LJ	JT	800 m	Final	Rank
Soma Biswas	Result	13.86	1.70	12.01	24.50	5.92	44.84	2:12.27	5965	24
Soma Biswas	Points	998	855	662	933	825	760	932	5965	24
Shobha Javur	Result	13.53	1.67	12.52	23.41	6.36	44.36	2:17.28	6172	11
Shobha Javur	Points	1046	818	696	1038	962	751	861	6172	11

== Badminton ==
Athlete	Event	Round of 32	Round of 16	Quarterfinal	Semifinal	Final / BM	
Athlete	Event	Opposition Score	Opposition Score	Opposition Score	Opposition Score	Opposition Score	Rank
Abhinn Shyam Gupta	Men's singles	Park T-S (KOR); L 12–15, 0–15	Did not advance				
Nikhil Kanetkar	Men's singles	Llopis (ESP); W 15–7, 13–15, 15–13	Gade (DEN); L 10–15, 6–15	Did not advance			
Aparna Popat	Women's singles	Edwards (RSA); W 11–6, 11–3	Audina (NED); L 11–9, 1–11, 3–11	Did not advance			

== Boxing ==
Athlete	Event	Round of 32	Round of 16	Quarterfinals	Semifinals	Final	
Athlete	Event	Opposition Result	Opposition Result	Opposition Result	Opposition Result	Opposition Result	Rank
Akhil Kumar	Flyweight	Thomas (FRA); L 16–37	Did not advance				
Diwakar Prasad	Bantamweight	Ait Bighrade (MAR); W 25–17	Bolum (NGR); L RSC	Did not advance			
Vijender Singh	Light welterweight	Karagöllü (TUR); L 20–25	Did not advance				
Jitender Kumar	Light heavyweight	Fedchuk (UKR); L RSC	Did not advance				

== Field hockey ==
=== Men's tournament ===
Roster

The following is the Indian roster in the men's field hockey tournament of the 2004 Summer Olympics.

Head coach: Gerhard Rach

1. Devesh Chauhan (GK)
3. Dilip Tirkey
4. Sandeep Singh
6. Ignace Tirkey
7. Prabhjot Singh
8. Deepak Thakur
9. Dhanraj Pillay
10. Baljit Singh Dhillon
11. Gagan Ajit Singh
12. Adrian D'Souza (GK)
14. William Xalco
18. Viren Rasquinha
23. Arjun Halappa
24. Adam Sinclair
25. Harpal Singh
27. Vikram Pillay

Group play

Pos	Team	Pld	W	D	L	GF	GA	GD	Pts	Qualification
1	Netherlands	5	5	0	0	16	9	+7	15	Semi-finals
2	Australia	5	3	1	1	14	10	+4	10	Semi-finals
3	New Zealand	5	3	0	2	13	11	+2	9	5–8th place semi-finals
4	India	5	1	1	3	11	13	−2	4	5–8th place semi-finals
5	South Africa	5	1	0	4	9	15	−6	3	9–12th place semi-finals
6	Argentina	5	0	2	3	8	13	−5	2	9–12th place semi-finals

Source: FIH

15 August 2004
20:30

Netherlands	3 – 1	India
Eikelboom 2'; De Nooijer 50'; Taekema 54'	Report	G. A. Singh 69'

Umpires:
Murray Grime (AUS)
Jason McCracken (NZL)

17 August 2004
18:00

South Africa	2 – 4	India
Nicol 7'; Fulton 12'	Report	D. Pillay 27'; B. Singh 41'; D. Tirkey 69'; G. A. Singh 70'

Umpires:
Ray O'Connor (IRL)
David Leiper (GBR)

19 August 2004
20:30

Australia	4 – 3	India
Elder 11'; Dwyer 38'; McCann 49'; Brennan 70'	Report	Thakur 6'; G. A. Singh 50'; Halappa 52'

Umpires:
Henrik Ehlers (DEN)
John Wright (RSA)

21 August 2004
10:30

India	1 – 2	New Zealand
D. Pillay 62'	Report	Burrows 36'; Shaw 70+'

Umpires:
Ray O'Connor (IRL)
Xavier Adell (ESP)

23 August 2004
20:00

India	2 – 2	Argentina
G. A. Singh 33', 60'	Report	Vila 52', 69'

Umpires:
David Gentles (AUS)
Peter Elders (NED)

5th-8th Place Semifinal

25 August 2004
20:30

Pakistan	3 – 0	India
Aziz 43'; Abbas 59'; Shabbir 68'	Report

Umpires:
David Leiper (GBR)
Amarjit Singh (MAS)

7th-8th Place Final

27 August 2004
08:30

South Korea	2 – 5	India
Ji Seong-Hwan 57'; Kang Seong-Jung 58'	Report	G. A. Singh 4', 11'; V. Pillay 15'; P. Singh 32'; Sinclair 68'

Umpires:
Jason McCracken (NZL)
Peter Elders (NED)

== Judo ==
Athlete	Event	Round of 32	Round of 16	Quarterfinals	Semifinals	Repechage 1	Repechage 2	Repechage 3	Final / BM	
Athlete	Event	Opposition Result	Opposition Result	Opposition Result	Opposition Result	Opposition Result	Opposition Result	Opposition Result	Opposition Result	Rank
Akram Shah	Men's −60 kg	Tsagaanbaatar (MGL); L 0000–1000	Did not advance			Williams-Murray (USA); W 1100–0000	Choi M-H (KOR); L 0000–1000	Did not advance		

== Rowing ==
Indian rowers qualified the following boats:

Men

Athlete	Event	Heats		Repechage		Semifinals		Final	
Athlete	Event	Time	Rank	Time	Rank	Time	Rank	Time	Rank
Paulose Pandari Kunnel	Single sculls	8:00.11	5 R	7:29.47	4 SD/E	7:48.38	5 FE	7:22.63	27

Qualification Legend: FA=Final A (medal); FB=Final B (non-medal); FC=Final C (non-medal); FD=Final D (non-medal); FE=Final E (non-medal); FF=Final F (non-medal); SA/B=Semifinals A/B; SC/D=Semifinals C/D; SE/F=Semifinals E/F; R=Repechage

== Sailing ==
Indian sailors have qualified one boat for each of the following events.

Open

Athlete	Event	Race																Net points	Final rank
Athlete	Event	1	2	3	4	5	6	7	8	9	10	11	12	13	14	15	M*	Net points	Final rank
Sumeet Patel; Malav Shroff	49er	17	~~19~~	18	15	18	19	18	19	19	19	18	19	~~DNS~~	19	17	18	253	19

M = Medal race; OCS = On course side of the starting line; DSQ = Disqualified; DNF = Did not finish; DNS= Did not start; RDG = Redress given

== Shooting ==
Eight Indian shooters (five men and three women) qualified to compete in the following events:

Men

Athlete	Event	Qualification		Final	
Athlete	Event	Points	Rank	Points	Rank
Abhinav Bindra	10 m air rifle	597	3 Q	694.6	7
Gagan Narang	10 m air rifle	593	12	Did not advance	
Rajyavardhan Singh Rathore	Double trap	135	5 Q	179	2nd place, silver medalist(s)
Manavjit Singh Sandhu	Trap	116	=19	Did not advance	
Mansher Singh	Trap	115	=21	Did not advance	

Women

Athlete	Event	Qualification		Final	
Athlete	Event	Points	Rank	Points	Rank
Anjali Bhagwat	10 m air rifle	393	=20	Did not advance	
Anjali Bhagwat	50 m rifle 3 positions	575	=13	Did not advance	
Deepali Deshpande	50 m rifle 3 positions	572	19	Did not advance	
Suma Shirur	10 m air rifle	396	7 Q	497.2	8

== Swimming ==
Women

Athlete	Event	Heat		Semifinal		Final	
Athlete	Event	Result	Rank	Result	Rank	Result	Rank
Shikha Tandon	50 m freestyle	27.08	40	Did not advance			
Shikha Tandon	100 m freestyle	59.70	46	Did not advance			

== Table tennis ==
Athlete	Event	Round 1	Round 2	Round 3	Round 4	Quarterfinals	Semifinals	Final / BM	
Athlete	Event	Opposition Result	Opposition Result	Opposition Result	Opposition Result	Opposition Result	Opposition Result	Opposition Result	Rank
Sharath Kamal	Men's singles	Boudjadja (ALG); W 4–1	Ko L C (HKG); L 0–4	Did not advance					
Mouma Das	Women's singles	Komwong (THA); L 0–4	Did not advance						

== Tennis ==
Athlete	Event	Round of 32	Round of 16	Quarterfinals	Semifinals	Final / BM	
Athlete	Event	Opposition Score	Opposition Score	Opposition Score	Opposition Score	Opposition Score	Rank
Mahesh Bhupathi; Leander Paes	Men's doubles	Fish / Roddick (USA); W 7–6^{(7–5)}, 6–3	Allegro / Federer (SUI); W 6–2, 7–6^{(9–7)}	Black / Ullyett (ZIM); W 6–4, 6–4	Kiefer / Schüttler (GER); L 2–6, 3–6	Ančić / Ljubičić (CRO); L 6–7^{(5–7)}, 6–4, 14–16	4

== Weightlifting ==
Three Indian weightlifters qualified for the following events:

Athlete	Event	Snatch		Clean & Jerk		Total	Rank
Athlete	Event	Result	Rank	Result	Rank	Total	Rank
Kunjarani Devi	Women's −48 kg	82.5	=4	107.5	4	190	4
Sanamacha Chanu	Women's −53 kg	82.5	6	107.5	4	~~190~~	DSQ
Karnam Malleswari	Women's −63 kg	~~100.0~~	DNF	—	—	—	DNF

* Sanamacha Chanu originally finished fourth, but was disqualified after being tested positive for furosemide.

== Wrestling ==
Key:

- VT - Victory by Fall.
- PP - Decision by Points - the loser with technical points.
- PO - Decision by Points - the loser without technical points.

Men's freestyle

Athlete	Event	Elimination Pool			Quarterfinal	Semifinal	Final / BM	
Athlete	Event	Opposition Result	Opposition Result	Rank	Opposition Result	Opposition Result	Opposition Result	Rank
Yogeshwar Dutt	−55 kg	Tanabe (JPN); L 1–3 ^{PP}	Abdullayev (AZE); L 1–3 ^{PP}	3	Did not advance			18
Sushil Kumar	−60 kg	Quintana (CUB); L 0–3 ^{PO}	Djorev (BUL); W 3–0 ^{PO}	2	Did not advance			14
Ramesh Kumar	−66 kg	Taskoudis (GRE); L 1–3 ^{PP}	Hovhannisyan (ARM); W 3–1 ^{PP}	3	Did not advance			10
Sujeet Maan	−74 kg	Obata (JPN); L 0–3 ^{PO}	Fundora (CUB); L 0–3 ^{PO}	3	Did not advance			18
Anuj Kumar	−84 kg	Khodaei (IRI); L 1–3 ^{PP}	Yokoyama (JPN); L 1–3 ^{PP}	3	Did not advance			16
Palwinder Singh Cheema	−120 kg	Taymazov (UZB); L 0–4 ^{ST}	Garmulewicz (POL); L 1–3 ^{PP}	3	Did not advance			15

Men's Greco-Roman

Athlete	Event	Elimination Pool			Quarterfinal	Semifinal	Final / BM	
Athlete	Event	Opposition Result	Opposition Result	Rank	Opposition Result	Opposition Result	Opposition Result	Rank
Mukesh Khatri	−55 kg	Mamedaliyev (RUS); L 0–3 ^{PO}	Jabłoński (POL); L 0–3 ^{PO}	3	Did not advance			21

== See also ==
- India at the 2002 Asian Games
- India at the 2004 Summer Paralympics
