= Sang Lin =

Sang Lin is the romanization of various Chinese names. It may refer to:

- Sang Lin (桑林), a deity of ancient Chinese myth
- Lin Sang (林桑), an Olympic archer
