= Mroziński =

Mroziński (feminine: Mrozińska, plural: Mrozińscy) is a Polish surname. It may refer to:

- Anna Mrozińska (born 1985), Polish rhythmic gymnast
- Marcin Mroziński (born 1985), Polish actor, singer and television presenter
- Piotr Mroziński (born 1992), Polish footballer
- Ron Mrozinski (1930–2005), American baseball player
