= Małgorzata Ławrynowicz =

Polish rhythmic gymnast (born 1988)

Malgorzata Lawrynowicz
- Born: 15 December 1988 (age 37) Wejherowo, Poland
- Height: 5 ft 4.5 in (163.8 cm)

Gymnastics career
- Discipline: Rhythmic gymnastics
- Country represented: Poland; (2004-2007 (?))
- Club: SGA Gdynia

Malgorzata Lawrynowicz (born 15 December 1988 in Wejherowo) is a Polish group rhythmic gymnast representing her nation at international competitions.

She participated at the 2004 Summer Olympics in the all-around event together with Justyna Banasiak, Martyna Dąbkowska, Alexandra Wójcik, Anna Mrozińska and Aleksandra Zawistowska finishing 10th. She competed at world championships, including at the 2005 and 2007 World Rhythmic Gymnastics Championships.
