= Alexandra Wójcik (gymnast) =

Polish rhythmic gymnast (born 1985)

Alexandra Wojcik
- Born: 5 March 1985 (age 41) Lębork, Poland
- Height: 5 ft 6.5 in (169 cm)

Gymnastics career
- Discipline: Rhythmic gymnastics
- Country represented: Poland (2004–2011 (?))
- Club: SGA Gdynia

Alexandra Wojcik (born 5 March 1985 in Lębork) is a Polish group rhythmic gymnast representing her nation at international competitions. She participated at the 2004 Summer Olympics in the all-around event together with Justyna Banasiak, Martyna Dąbkowska, Małgorzata Ławrynowicz, Anna Mrozińska and Aleksandra Zawistowska finishing 10th. She competed at world championships, including at the 2005, 2007, 2009, 2010 and 2011 World Rhythmic Gymnastics Championships.
