= Piotr Gabrych =

Polish volleyball player (born 1972)

Personal information
- Nationality: Polish
- Born: 5 July 1972 (age 54)
- Height: 1.97 m (6 ft 6 in)
- Weight: 95 kg (209 lb)
- Spike: 342 cm (135 in)
- Block: 318 cm (125 in)

Volleyball information
- Number: 14

Career
Years	Teams
2004	(Poland) Jastrzębski Węgiel

National team
2004	Poland

Piotr Gabrych (born 5 July 1972) is a former Polish male volleyball player. He was part of the Poland men's national volleyball team. He competed with the national team at the 2004 Summer Olympics in Athens, Greece. He played with Jastrzębski Węgiel in 2004.

== Clubs ==
- (Poland) Jastrzębski Węgiel (2004)

== See also ==
- Poland at the 2004 Summer Olympics
