= Martyna Dąbkowska =

Polish rhythmic gymnast (born 1989)

- Born: 25 May 1989 (age 37) Gdynia, Poland
- Height: 5 ft 5 in (165 cm)

Gymnastics career
- Discipline: Rhythmic gymnastics
- Country represented: Poland (2004–2007 (?))
- Club: SGA Gdynia

Martyna Dąbkowska (born 25 May 1989 in Gdynia) is a Polish group rhythmic gymnast representing her nation at international competitions.

She participated at the 2004 Summer Olympics in the all-around event together with Justyna Banasiak, Aleksandra Wójcik, Małgorzata Ławrynowicz, Anna Mrozińska and Aleksandra Zawistowska finishing 10th.

She competed at world championships, including at the 2005, and 2007 World Rhythmic Gymnastics Championships.
