= Justyna Banasiak =

Polish rhythmic gymnast (born 1986)

- Born: 2 May 1986 (age 40) Szczecin, Poland
- Height: 5 ft 6.5 in (169 cm)

Gymnastics career
- Discipline: Rhythmic gymnastics
- Country represented: Poland (2004–2005 (?))
- Club: MKS Kusy Szczecin

Justyna Banasiak (born 2 May 1986 in Szczecin) is a Polish group rhythmic gymnast. She represents her nation at international competitions.

She participated at the 2004 Summer Olympics in the group all-around event together with Alexandra Wójcik, Martyna Dąbkowska, Małgorzata Ławrynowicz, Anna Mrozińska and Aleksandra Zawistowska finishing 10th. She competed at world championships, including at the 2005 World Rhythmic Gymnastics Championships.
