= Yuliya Lobzhenidze =

Ukrainian and Georgian archer (born 1977)

Personal information
- Nationality: Georgian
- Born: 23 August 1977 (age 48)

Sport
- Sport: Archery
Medal record
Representing Ukraine
World Indoor Championships
Gold medal – first place	2003 Nîmes	Recurve (team)
World Championships
Bronze medal – third place	2003 New York City	Recurve (team)
European Championships
Gold medal – first place	2004 Brussels	Recurve (team)
Silver medal – second place	2006 Athens	Recurve (team)
European Indoor Championships
Silver medal – second place	2008 Turin	Recurve (team)
Silver medal – second place	2008 Turin	Recurve (individual)
Representing Georgia
World Indoor Championships
Bronze medal – third place	2016 Ankara	Recurve (team)
European Championships
Silver medal – second place	2016 Nottingham	Recurve (team)
European Indoor Championships
Silver medal – second place	2015 Koper	Recurve (team)

Yuliya Lobzhenidze (born 23 August 1977) is a Ukrainian and Georgian archer. She competed in the archery competition at the 2016 Summer Olympics, where she finished 57th out of 64 competitors in the individual competition and, along with Kristine Esebua and Khatuna Narimanidze, 12th out of 12 teams in the team competition.
