= Mari Piuva =

Finnish archer (born 1980)

Mari Piuva (born 21 October 1980) is an archer from Finland who competed at the 2004 Summer Olympics.

Piuva was born in Kemi in Lapland and was introduced to archery at the age of fifteen. She was a three-time Finnish national archery champion prior to winning a qualification spot for the 2004 Olympics at that year's European Archery Championships. Entering the women's individual event, Piuva was seeded 49th for the competition's elimination rounds with a score of 615 points – from a maximum of 720 – in the preliminary 72-arrow ranking round. After defeating Georgia's Natalia Nasaridze in her opening elimination match she was beaten by Great Britain's Naomi Folkard in the second round.
