= May Mansour =

Egyptian archer (born 1984)

May Mansour (born 28 October 1984) is an athlete from Egypt. She competes in archery.

Mansour represented Egypt at the 2004 Summer Olympics. She placed 64th in the women's individual ranking round with a 72-arrow score of 536. In the first round of elimination, she faced first-ranked and eventual gold medalist Park Sung-hyun. Mansour lost 154–102 in the 18-arrow match, placing 64th overall in women's individual archery.
