= Zekiye Keskin Şatır =

Turkish archer (born 1976)

Medal record

Women's Archery

Mediterranean Games
Silver medal – second place	2005 Almería, Spain	Team

Zekiye Keskin Şatır (born 10 June 1976 in Istanbul) is a Turkish Olympic archer. Her coach Cumhur Yavaş and is a member of the İzmir Metropolitan Municipality Sport Club.

== 2004 Summer Olympics ==
Keskin Şatır represented Turkey at the 2004 Summer Olympics. She placed 25th in the women's individual ranking round with a 72-arrow score of 631. In the first round of elimination, she faced 40th-ranked Wiebke Nulle from Germany. Keskin Şatır defeated Nulle, winning in a 10–7 tie-breaker after tying 135 in the 18-arrow match to advance to the round of 32. In that round, she faced Evangelia Psarra from Greece, losing to the 8th-ranked archer 163–161 in the regulation 18 arrows. Keskin Şatır finished 17th in women's individual archery. She was also a member of the 10th-place Turkish women's archery team.

Keskin Şatır participated at the 2005 Mediterranean Games in Almería, Spain ranking 11th place. With the Turkish team, she won silver medal.

== 2008 Summer Olympics ==
At the 2008 Summer Olympics in Beijing Keskin Şatır finished her ranking round with a total of 644 points. This gave her the 16th seed for the final competition bracket in which she faced Elpida Romantzi in the first round. The archer from Greece who was only the 49th seed was too strong in the confrontation and won the match with 105–103, eliminating Keskin Şatır.
