= Natalia Bolotova =

Russian archer (born 1963)

Medal record

Women's Archery

Representing Russia

World Championships
Silver medal – second place	1993 Antalya	Team

European Championships
Silver medal – second place	1990	Individual

Natalia Dugarnimaevna Bolotova (Russian: Наталья Дугарнимаевна Болотова, born 9 March 1963 in Tsagan-Oluy, Zabaykalsky Kray) is a Russian archer.

Bolotova represented Russia at the 2004 Summer Olympics. She placed 33rd in the women's individual ranking round with a 72-arrow score of 625. In the first round of elimination, she faced 32nd-ranked Mon Redee Sut Txi of Malaysia. Bolotova defeated Sut Txi, winning 154-143 in the 18-arrow match to advance to the round of 32. In that round, she faced Park Sung-hyun of Korea, losing to the 1st-ranked and eventual gold medalist archer 165-148 in the regulation 18 arrows. Bolotova finished 30th in women's individual archery.

Bolotova was also a member of the 9th-place Russian women's archery team in the team competition.
