= Jasmin Figueroa =

Filipino archer (born 1985)

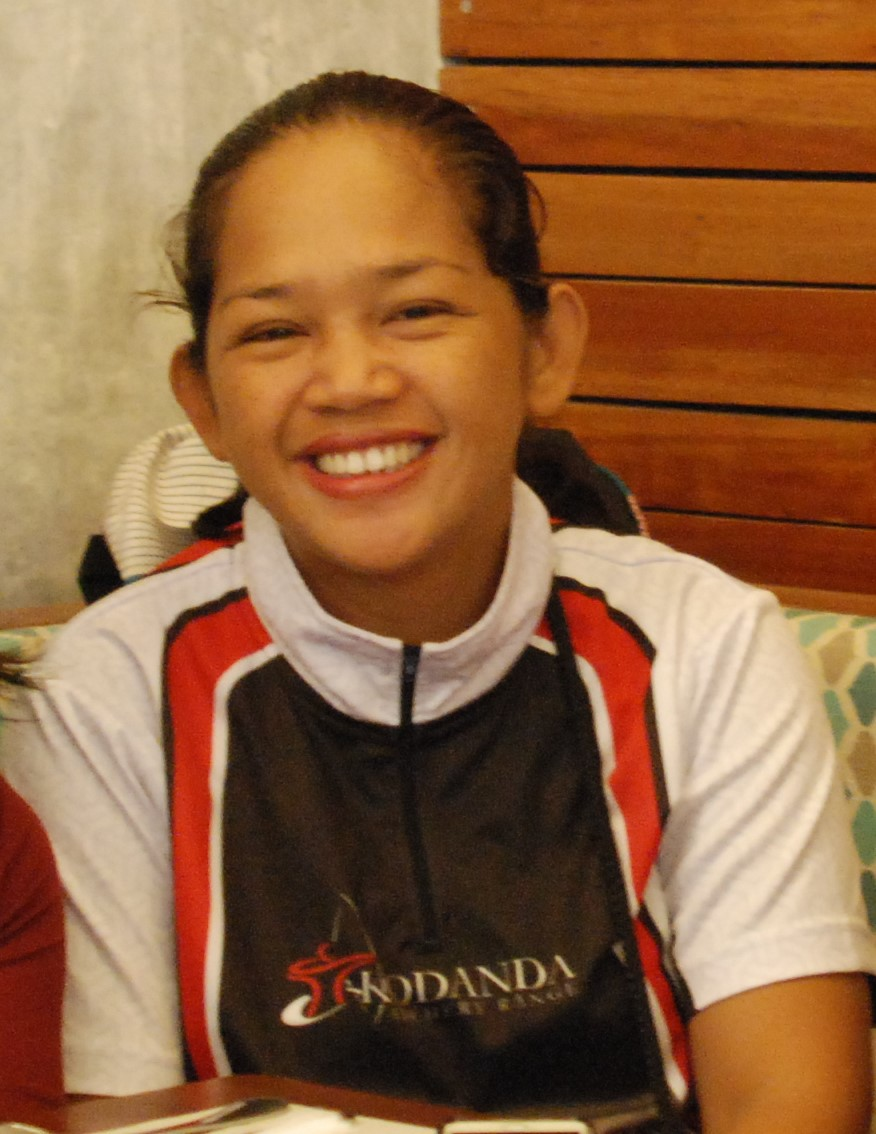
- Figueroa in 2017

Personal information
- Full name: Jasmin Lanaran Figueroa-Dungca
- Nickname: Mengie
- Nationality: Filipino
- Born: March 20, 1985 (age 40) Tondo, Manila, Philippines
- Years active: 1995–2005
- Height: 5 ft 2 in (157 cm)
- Weight: 123 lb (56 kg)

Sport
- Country: Philippines
- Sport: Archery
- Coached by: Henry Manalang (2004)
- Retired: 2005

Jasmin Lanaran Figueroa-Dungca (born 20 March 1985 in Tondo, Manila, Philippines) is an athlete from the Philippines. She competed in archery and is a former student of the University of Makati.

Figueroa took up archery in 1995 and started representing the Philippines in international tournaments in May 2003. Figueroa was the sole athlete competing for the Philippines at the 2004 Summer Olympics in archery. She was coached by Henry Manalang. She placed 56th in the women's individual ranking round with a 72-arrow score of 600. In the first round of elimination, she faced 9th-ranked Natalia Valeeva of Italy. In an upset, Figueroa secured a narrow 132-130 win over Valeeva in the 18-arrow match to advance to the round of 32.In that round, she faced Almudena Gallardo of Spain, losing to the 24th-ranked archer 152-150 in the regulation 18 arrows. Figueroa finished 27th in women's individual archery.

Figueroa was awarded the International Olympic Committee Trophy for Fair Play.

Figueroa retired from active competition shortly after the 2005 South East Asian Games.

Figueroa started working at Pampanga State Agricultural University in 2006 as assistant coach in archery to her Olympic coach, Henry Manalang. Figueroa was then promoted to head coach in 2007 after Manalang left to work at La Union. Figueroa left Pampanga State Agricultural University in 2015. From early 2016 to early 2017, she worked at Kodanda Archery Range (Mall of Asia branch) as a coach. She is now a private coach.

She married Jerald Dungca on August 31, 2010. They have 4 children, 3 boys and 1 girl.
