= Kamil Rajnert =

Polish equestrian

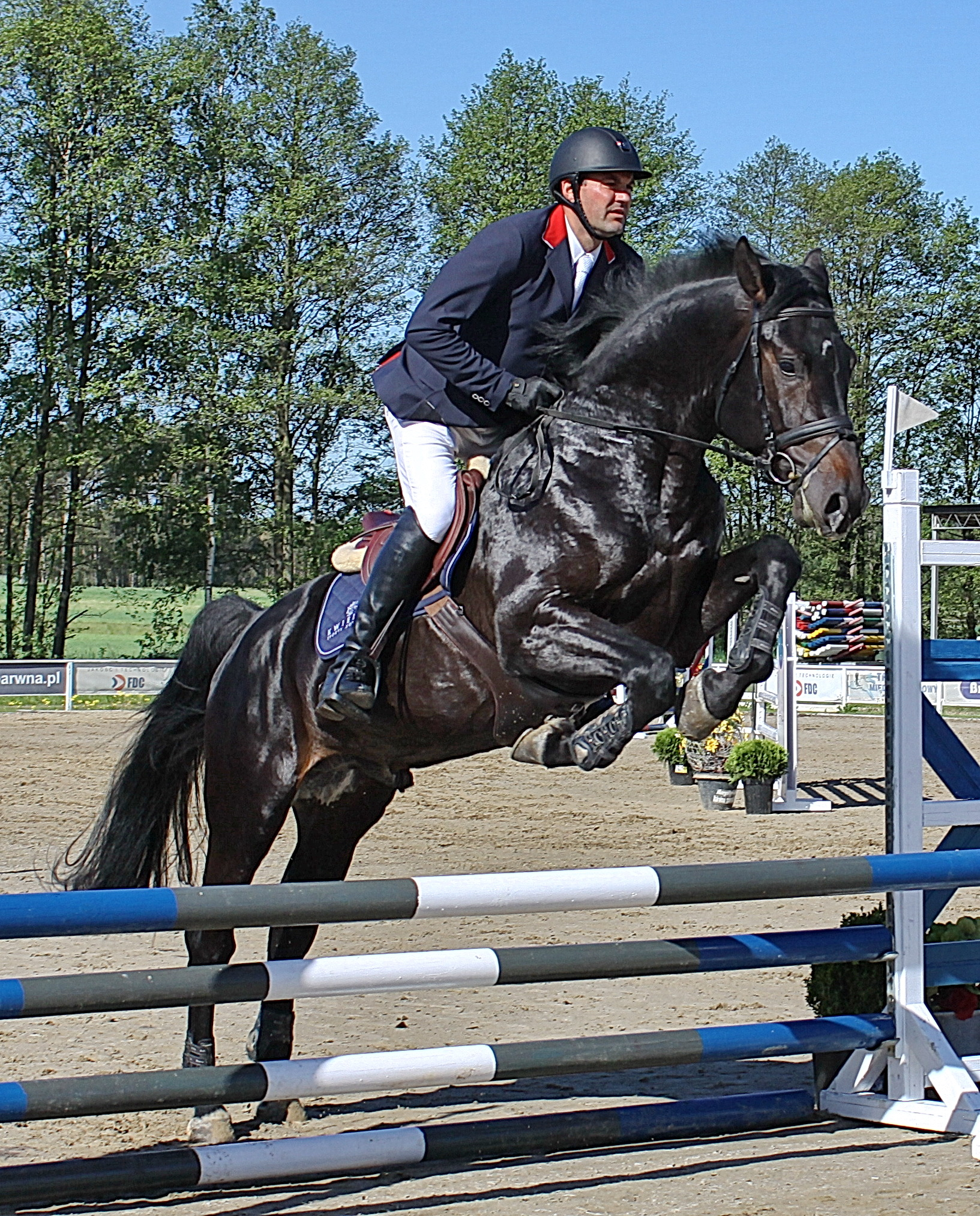
- Rajnert in 2017.

Personal information
- Nationality: Polish
- Born: 29 November 1976 (age 48); Trzebiatów, Poland

Sport
- Sport: Equestrian

Kamil Rajnert (born 29 November 1976) is a Polish equestrian. He competed in two events at the 2004 Summer Olympics.
