= Helen Palmer (archer) =

British archer (born 1974)

Helen Palmer (born 19 September 1974) is a British recurve archer who represented Great Britain at the 2004 Summer Olympics.

Prior to winning selection to the British Olympic archery team, Palmer had been a member of the British team that concluded the 2003 World Archery Championships in third place. In Athens she finished in sixty-first place in the preliminary 72-arrow ranking round, which determined the seedings for the subsequent elimination rounds of the women's individual event, setting up a first round encounter with 1996 Olympic silver medalist He Ying of China. Over the sixteen-arrow match He outscored Palmer by 141 points to 130, eliminating Palmer from the event. Palmer and her teammates Naomi Folkard and Alison Williamson also failed to advance beyond the first elimination stage of the team competition after losing to India by 230 points to 228.

At the time of the 2004 Olympics, Palmer was a senior marketing manager with Alliance and Leicester bank, and a member of the Long Mynd Archers club in Church Stretton, Shropshire.
