= Lamia Bahnasawy =

Egyptian archer (born 1984)

Lamia Bahnasawy (born 11 November 1984) is an athlete from Egypt. She competes in archery.

Bahnasawy represented Egypt at the 2004 Summer Olympics. She placed 63rd in the women's individual ranking round with a 72-arrow score of 564. In the first round of elimination, she faced 2nd-ranked and eventual silver medalist Lee Sung Jin of Korea. Bahnasawy lost 164–127 in the 18-arrow match, placing 58th overall in women's individual archery.
