= Andrzej Pasek =

Polish equestrian

Personal information
- Nationality: Polish
- Born: 13 March 1974 (age 51); Trzebiatów, Poland

Sport
- Sport: Equestrian

Andrzej Pasek (born 13 March 1974) is a Polish equestrian. He competed in two events at the 2004 Summer Olympics.
