= Radosław Rybak =

Polish volleyball player (born 1973)

Personal information
- Full name: Radosław Rybak
- Nickname: Kaczka
- Nationality: Polish
- Born: March 25, 1973 (age 53); Rawa Mazowiecka, Poland
- Height: 1.95 m (6 ft 5 in)
- Weight: 90 kg (198 lb)
- Spike: 348 cm (137 in)
- Block: 326 cm (128 in)

Volleyball information
- Position: Opposite
- Number: 14

Career
Years	Teams
1998–2000; 2000–2003; 2003–2005; 2005–2010; 2010; 2010–2011	Mazovia Rawa Mazowiecka; AZS Olsztyn; Jastrzębie Borynia; Morze Bałtyk Szczecin; Jastrzębie Borynia; AZS Politechnika Warszawska; Lechia Tomaszów Mazowiecki; Pamapol Siatkarz Wieluń

National team
2002–2004	Poland
- Last updated: 12 April 2017

Radosław Rybak (born 25 March 1973) is a former Polish volleyball player, a member of Poland men's national volleyball team in 2002–2004, a participant of the 2004 Olympic Games, 2004 Polish Champion.

== Career ==
In 2004 he achieved title of Polish Champion with club Ivett Jastrzębie Borynia. He ended up his career after season 2010/11, when he was a player of Pamapol Siatkarz Wieluń in 1st Polish League.

== Other ==
He is the chairman of the club Espadon Szczecin, which was built on the basis of the old club Morze Bałtyk Szczecin. Since 2016 his club has been played in PlusLiga.

== Sporting achievements ==
=== Clubs ===
==== National championships ====
- 2003/2004 Polish Championship, with Ivett Jastrzębie Borynia
