= Deonne Bridger =

Australian archer (born 1972)

Personal information
- Full name: Deonne Ellen Bridger
- Nationality: Australian
- Born: 15 May 1972 (age 54) Perth, Australia
- Height: 1.68 m (5 ft 6 in)
- Weight: 62 kg (137 lb)

Sport
- Country: Australia
- Sport: Archery
- Event: Women's recurve

Achievements and titles
- Olympic finals: 1996 in Atlanta, 2004 in Athens

Deonne Ellen Bridger (born 15 May 1972) is an Australian archer. She has represented Australia in archery at two different Olympic Games (1996 in Atlanta and 2004 in Athens). She also represented Australia at the 2010 Commonwealth Games. As of June 2011, she was the top-ranked female Australian archer.

== Personal ==
Bridger was born on 15 May 1972 in Perth, Western Australia. As of 2008 she is 168 centimetres (66 in) tall and weighs 62 kilograms (137 lb).

== Archery ==
Bridger began archery in 1976, at the age of four, in Kalgoorlie, Western Australia. She was an Australian Institute of Sport scholarship holder.

At the 1988 World Field Championships in Bolzano, Italy, she won a bronze medal in the junior women's recurve event. In October 2001, she finished first in the Ladies recurve event at the W.A. State Freestyle Field Championship while shooting for KGSA, with a marked score of 329 and unmarked score of 317 for a total of 646 with 143 hits and 86 5's. In December 2001, she was nationally ranked as the best female recurve archer in Australia with a WRL of 59, best listed of 1,288 and 2,518 current points. She was part of the Australian team at the 2002 European Grand Prix event held Turkey from 26 to 30 June. She won a bronze medal in the women's team event alongside teammates Madeleine Ferris and Marianne Gale at the 2002 World Field Championships in Canberra, Australia. In March 2003, she was ranked the best female Australian archer in recurve, ahead of Jo-Ann Galbraith. That month, she had a WRL of 82 and had 2,521 points.

Bridger represented Australia at the 2010 Commonwealth Games as a 38-year-old. In June 2011, she was Australia's highest ranked female archer.

Bridger attended a national team training camp in Canberra in September 2011 and March 2012. At the 2012 national championships in the team recurve event, she was part of Archery Western Australia's team. In the team target part, she had a score of 2,579. At the 2012 National Target Archery Championships, she finished first as a member of Archery Western Australia's team. As of 30 April 2012, she is ranked as Australia's top female recurve archer.

=== Olympics ===
Bridger represented Australia at the 1996 Atlanta Olympic Games and 2004 Athens Olympic Games. In Atlanta, competing as a 24-year-old, she finished 57th overall in the women's individual event. In the ranking round on 28 July 1996, she finished 50th with a TH of 72, scoring 11 10s and 28 9s. In the first half, she scored 209 and in the second half, she scored 306. In round one, match No. 2, she shot a 141 against Williamson of Great Britain. In Athens, when she was 32 years old, she finished 41st overall in the women's individual event. In the team event, she finished 11th. In the ranking round on 12 August 2004, she finished 29th overall, scoring 620 with 14 10s and 7 Xs. In the first half of the round, she scored 316. In the second half, she scored 304. In round one, match No. 26 on 15 August 2004, she went up against Beloslyudtseva of Kazakhstan, scoring 145 to Beloslyudtseva 's 150. In the 2004 team event, in the ranking round on 12 August 2004, her team scored 620 points and finished 15th. They met China on 20 August 2004 in Round One in Match No. 8. Australia lost, scoring 233 to China's 248. At the 2008 Summer Olympics, she was the Australian archery team's section manager. In September 2011, she was named to the Australian archery shadow Olympic team. At the September 2011 Australian Olympic Test event, she was ranked first with a score of 1278. In March at the 2012 Olympic Games Nomination Shoot Results, she finished first with a score of 2579.
