= Elpida Romantzi =

Greek archer (born 1981)

Elpida Romantzi (born July 17, 1981, in Thessalonica) is an archer from Greece.

She placed 34th in the women's individual ranking round with a 72-arrow score of 624 at the 2004 Summer Olympics. In the first round of elimination, she faced 11th-ranked Bérengère Schuh of France. Romantzi defeated Schuh, winning 151–143 in the 18-arrow match to advance to the round of 32. In that round, she faced Lee Sung Jin of Korea, losing to the 2nd-ranked and eventual silver medalist archer 166–146. Romantzi finished 31st in women's individual archery. Romantzi was also a member of the 5th-place Greek team in the women's team archery competition.

At the 2008 Summer Olympics in Beijing Romantzi finished her ranking round with a total of 614 points. This gave her the 49th seed for the final competition bracket in which she faced 16th seed Zekiye Keskin Satir in the first round, beating the archer from Turkey with 105–103. In the second round she was too strong for Kristine Esebua after both archers scored 102 points in the regular match and a 10–9 score in the decisive extra round. Romantzi was eliminated in the third round by first seed Park Sung-hyun with 115–103, with the 115 being a new Olympic Record.
