= Mon Redee Sut Txi =

Malaysian archer

Mon Redee Sut Txi (born 10 February 1982) is an athlete from Malaysia. A Malaysian of Thai heritage (Malaysian Siamese) from Pengkalan Hulu in Grik, Perak, she competes in archery.

Sut Txi represented Malaysia at the 2004 Summer Olympics. She placed 32nd in the women's individual ranking round with a 72-arrow score of 626. In the first round of elimination, she faced 33rd-ranked Natalia Bolotova of Russia. Sut Txi lost 154–143 in the 18-arrow match, placing 44th overall in women's individual archery.
