= Viktoriya Beloslyudtseva =

Kazakhstani archer (born 1972)

Medal record

Archery

Representing Kazakhstan

Asian Games
Bronze medal – third place	1998 Bangkok	Team

Viktoriya Beloslydtseva (born 9 January 1972) is an athlete from Kazakhstan. She competes in archery.

Beloslydtseva represented Kazakhstan at the 2004 Summer Olympics. She placed 26th in the women's individual ranking round with a 72-arrow score of 629. In the first round of elimination, she faced 39th-ranked Deonne Bridger of Australia. Beloslydtseva defeated Bridger, winning 150–145 in the 18-arrow match to advance to the round of 32. In that round, she faced Justyna Mospinek of Poland, losing to the 7th-ranked archer 163–155 in the regulation 18 arrows. Beloslydtseva finished 23rd in women's individual archery.

She competed at the 1998 Asian Games where she won a bronze medal in the team event.

As of 2012, she owned and managed an archery school near Pattaya, Thailand.
