= Fotini Vavatsi =

Greek archer (born 1974)

Fotini Vavatsi (born 16 March 1974, in Thessaloniki) is an archer from Greece. She represented Greece at the 2004 Summer Olympics.

She placed 51st in the women's individual ranking round with a 72-arrow score of 609. In the first round of elimination, she faced 15th-ranked Tetyana Berezhna of Ukraine. Vavatsi lost 160–156 in the 18-arrow match, placing 35th overall in women's individual archery.

Vavatsi was also a member of the 5th-place Greek team in the women's team archery competition.
