= Almudena Gallardo =

Spanish archer (born 1979)

Medal record

Women's Archery

Representing Spain

Mediterranean Games
Gold medal – first place	2005 Almería	Individual

Almudena Gallardo Vicente (born 26 March 1979 in Madrid) is a Spanish archer who competed in the 2000 and 2004 Summer Olympics.

== Career ==
Gallardo joined the Spanish national archery team in 1995 having won three consecutive national junior titles; at sixteen years old she was the team's youngest member. She made her Olympic debut in 2000 but was eliminated in the first round of the women's individual competition by Anna Karaseva of Belarus.

Gallardo entered the 2004 Summer Olympics as Spain's sole representative in the women's individual event. She began the event with a score of 631 points from a maximum of 720 in the 72-arrow ranking round, earning her the 24th seed for the subsequent elimination rounds. Victories over Georgia's Khatuna Narimanidze and Jasmin Figueroa of the Philippines saw her advance to the last sixteen, where after a poor start she was defeated by Greece's Evangelia Psarra by eight points over eighteen arrows. Although Spanish newspaper El País was critical of her performance, stating that she failed to live up to expectations, Gallardo afterwards expressed satisfaction with her result. In the event's final classification, she was placed thirteenth of the sixty-four competing archers.

In 2005, Gallardo won gold medal in the women's individual event of the 2005 Mediterranean Games, defeating Italy's Natalia Valeeva in the final.
