= Jo-Ann Galbraith =

Australian archer

Jo-Ann Galbraith (born 20 February 1985) is an athlete from Australia. She competes in archery. She was an Australian Institute of Sport scholarship holder.

Galbraith represented Australia at the 2004 Summer Olympics. She placed 57th in the women's individual ranking round with a 72-arrow score of 596. In the first round of elimination, she faced 8th-ranked Evangelia Psarra of Greece. Galbraith lost 138–116 in the 18-arrow match, placing 62nd overall in women's individual archery. Galbraith was also a member of the 11th-place Australian women's archery team.
