= Sumangala Sharma =

Indian archer

Sumangala Sharma (born 30 December 1986) is an athlete from India. She competes in archery.

Sharma represented India at the 2004 Summer Olympics. She placed 20th in the women's individual ranking round with a 72-arrow score of 638. In the first round of elimination, she faced 45th-ranked Chen Li Ju of Chinese Taipei. Sharma defeated Chen, winning 142–133 in the 18-arrow match to advance to the round of 32. In that round, she faced Kirstin Jean Lewis of South Africa, losing to the 52nd-ranked archer 157–153 in the regulation 18 arrows. Bolotova finished 24th in women's individual archery.

Sharma was also a member of the 8th-place Indian women's archery team.
