= Kirstin Jean Lewis =

South African archer (born 1975)

Kirstin Jean Lewis (born 1975) is a South African archer. She represented South Africa at the 1996, 2000 and 2004 Summer Olympics.

In 2004, she placed 52nd in the women's individual ranking round with a 72-arrow score of 606. In the first round of elimination, she faced 13th-ranked Dola Banerjee of India. Lewis pulled off a surprising upset, defeating Banerjee 141–131 in the 18-arrow match to advance to the round of 32. In that round, she faced another Indian archer, Sumangala Sharma. Lewis won the match 157–153 in the regulation 18 arrows, advancing to the round of 16. Lewis lost to 4th-ranked He Ying of China 156–142, finishing 16th in women's individual archery.
