= Thin Thin Khaing =

Burmese archer

Thin Thin Khaing (Burmese: သင်သင်ကြိုင်) born 4 May 1978) is an athlete from Pegu, Burma. She competes in archery.

She is currently working in Sumitomo Corporation, Yangon, Myanmar.

Thin represented Myanmar at the 2004 Summer Olympics. She placed 38th in the women's individual ranking round with a 72-arrow score of 622. In the first round of elimination, she faced 27th-ranked Małgorzata Sobieraj of Poland. Thin forced a tie-breaker by tying the match at 151 after the regulation 18 arrows. She then matched Sobieraj arrow for arrow through the three tie-breaker arrows, shooting two 9s and an 8. Unfortunately for Thin, Sobieraj's final arrow was slightly closer to the center of the target, allowing Sobieraj to advance and eliminating Thin with a final rank of 39th overall in women's individual archery.
