= Chen Li-ju =

Taiwanese archer (born 1981)

Personal information
- Born: 24 April 1981 (age 45) Taoyuan City, Taiwan
Medal record
Women's compound archery
Representing Chinese Taipei
Olympic Games
Bronze medal – third place	2004 Athens	Team
Asian Championships
Bronze medal – third place	2015 Bangkok	Mixed team
Summer Universiade
Gold medal – first place	2009 Belgrade	Team

Chen Li-Ju (Chinese: 陳麗如; pinyin: Chén Lìrú; Wade–Giles: Ch'en Li-ju; born 24 April 1981) is a Taiwanese archer who represented Taiwan (as Chinese Taipei) at the 2004 Summer Olympics. She placed 45th in the women's individual ranking round with a 72-arrow score of 617. In the first round of elimination, she faced 20th-ranked Sumangala Sharma of India. Chen lost 142–133 in the 18-arrow match, placing 50th overall in women's individual archery.

Chen was also a member of the team that won the bronze medal for Chinese Taipei in the women's team archery competition.
