= Archery at the 2004 Summer Olympics – Women's team =

Women's team at the Games of the XXVIII Olympiad
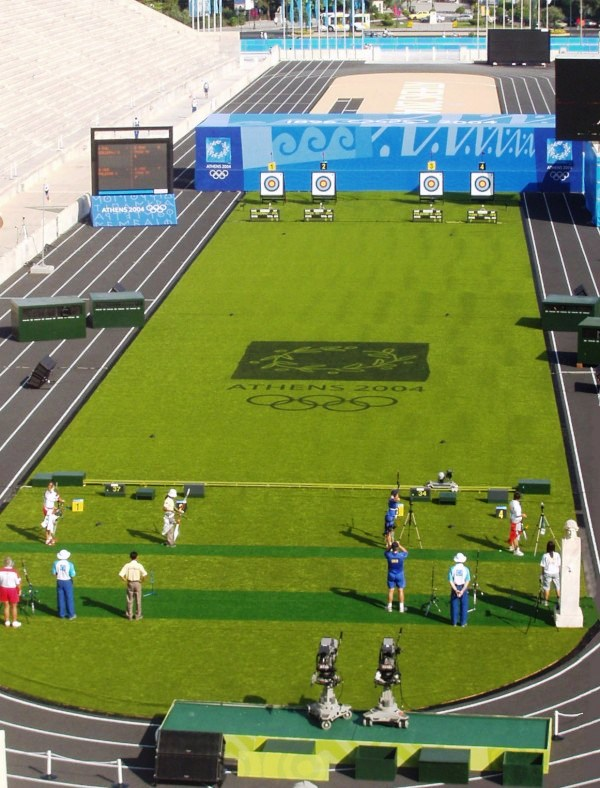
- A round of 16 match in progress
- Venue: Panathinaiko Stadium
- Date: 20 August 2004
- Competitors: 45 from 15 nations
- Winning score: 241

Medalists
| 1st place, gold medalist(s) | | Lee Sung-Jin; Park Sung-hyun; Yun Mi-Jin | South Korea |
| 2nd place, silver medalist(s) | | He Ying; Lin Sang; Zhang Juanjuan | China |
| 3rd place, bronze medalist(s) | | Chen Li Ju; Wu Hui-ju; Yuan Shu-chi | Chinese Taipei |

The Women's team at the 2004 Summer Olympics as part of the archery programme were held at the Panathinaiko Stadium.

The women's team archery was held on 20 August, after all of the individual competition had finished but before the men's team competition.

== Records ==
- 216 arrow ranking round

| World record | South Korea; Kim Soo-Nyung, Kim Nam-Soon, Yun Mi-Jin | 1994 | Sydney, Australia | 16 September 2000 |
| Olympic record | South Korea; Kim Soo-Nyung, Kim Nam-Soon, Yun Mi-Jin | 1994 | Sydney, Australia | 16 September 2000 |

- 27 arrow match

| World record | South Korea; Lee Sung-Jin, Park Sung-hyun, Yun Mi-Jin | 258 | Wyhl. Germany | 19 June 2004 |
| Olympic record | South Korea; Kim Soo-Nyung, Kim Nam-Soon, Yun Mi-Jin | 252 | Sydney, Australia | 21 September 2000 |

== Ranking round ==
The team ranking round consisted merely of summing the scores of the team's three competitors from the individual ranking round.

| Rank | Nation | Score | | | |
| Rank | Nation | 1 | 2 | 3 | Total |
|---|---|---|---|---|---|
| 1 | South Korea | 682 | 675 | 673 | 2030 |
| 2 | China | 667 | 663 | 647 | 1977 |
| 3 | Chinese Taipei | 658 | 649 | 617 | 1924 |
| 4 | Poland | 657 | 628 | 628 | 1913 |
| 5 | India | 642 | 638 | 620 | 1900 |
| 6 | Germany | 638 | 632 | 620 | 1890 |
| 7 | Turkey | 639 | 631 | 620 | 1890 |
| 8 | Greece | 652 | 629 | 604 | 1885 |
| 9 | United States | 638 | 623 | 619 | 1880 |
| 10 | Ukraine | 643 | 640 | 595 | 1878 |
| 11 | Russia | 639 | 625 | 609 | 1873 |
| 12 | Great Britain | 638 | 637 | 594 | 1869 |
| 13 | France | 627 | 626 | 594 | 1847 |
| 14 | Japan | 624 | 622 | 601 | 1847 |
| 15 | Australia | 628 | 620 | 596 | 1844 |

== Competition bracket ==
First round
8 | Greece | 230
9 | United States | 227
5 | India | 230
12 | Great Britain | 228
13 | France | 226
4 | Poland | 224
3 | Chinese Taipei | 240
14 | Japan | 226
6 | Germany | 238
11 | Russia | 234
10 | Ukraine | 244
7 | Turkey | 234
2 | China | 248
15 | Australia | 233

Second round
1 | South Korea | 244
8 | Greece | 232
5 | India | 227
13 | France | 228
3 | Chinese Taipei | 233
6 | Germany | 230
10 | Ukraine | 230
2 | China | 241

Semifinals
1 | South Korea | 249
13 | France | 234
3 | Chinese Taipei | 226
2 | China | 230

Finals
1 | South Korea | 241
2 | China | 240
Third place
13 | France | 228
3 | Chinese Taipei | 242
