= Justyna Mospinek =

Polish archer (born 1983)

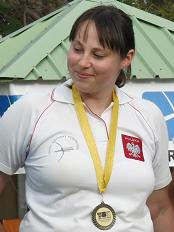
- Justyna Mospinek at 2009 Archery World Cup in Santo Domingo

Personal information
- National team: Poland
- Born: 8 November 1983 (age 42) Zgierz, Poland

Sport
- Sport: Archery
Medal record
Women's recurve archery
Representing Poland
Universiade
Bronze medal – third place	2005 Izmir	Team
Bronze medal – third place	2009 Belgrade	Mixed team

Justyna Mospinek (born 8 November 1983 in Zgierz) is an athlete from Poland who competes in archery.

== 2004 Summer Olympics ==
Mospinek represented Poland at the 2004 Summer Olympics. She placed 7th in the women's individual ranking round with a 72-arrow score of 657. In the first round of elimination, she faced 58th-ranked Maydenia Sarduy of Cuba. Mospinek defeated Sarduy 162–145 in the 18-arrow match to advance to the round of 32. In that round, she faced Viktoriya Beloslydtseva of Kazakhstan. Mospinek won the match 163–155 in the regulation 18 arrows, advancing to the round of 16. Mospinek then lost to 10th-ranked Wu Hui Ju of Chinese Taipei (Taiwan) 160–151, finishing 14th in women's individual archery. Mospinek was also a member of the 15th-place Polish women's archery team.

== 2008 Summer Olympics ==
At the 2008 Summer Olympics in Beijing, Mospinek finished her ranking round with a total of 643 points. This gave her the 19th seed for the final competition bracket in which she faced Sayoko Kitabutake in the first round. Despite Kitabutake being only the 46th seed, she managed to upset Mospinek with a 103–101 win. Together with Małgorzata Ćwienczek and Iwona Marcinkiewicz, Mospinek also took part in the team event. With her 643 score from the ranking round combined with the 645 of Ćwienczek and the 620 of Marcinkiewicz the Polish team was in fourth position after the ranking round, which gave them a straight seed into the quarter-final. There they were beaten by the French team with 218–211. The French eventually won the bronze medal.
