= Wiebke Nulle =

German archer (born 1980)

Personal information
- Born: 5 June 1980 (age 46) Wilhelmshaven, Niedersachsen, West Germany
Medal record
Women's archery
Representing Germany
World Championships
Bronze medal – third place	1999 Riom	Team (recurve)

Wiebke Nulle (born 5 June 1980) is an athlete from Germany. She competes in archery. She was born in Wilhelmshaven.

== Biography ==
Nulle represented Germany at the 2004 Summer Olympics. She placed 40th in the women's individual ranking round with a 72-arrow score of 620. In the first round of elimination, she faced 25th-ranked Zekiye Keskin Satir of Turkey. Nulle nearly pulled off an upset, tying the match at 135 after the initial 18 arrows. However, she was defeated 10–7 in the first tie-breaker, leading to a final ranking of 48th overall in women's individual archery. Nulle was also a member of the 7th-place German team in the women's team archery competition.
