= Sayami Matsushita =

Japanese archer (born 1982)

Medal record

Women's recurve archery

Representing Japan

Asian Championships
Gold medal – first place	2009 Denpasar	Team

Sayami Matsushita (松下 紗耶未, Matsushita Sayami; born April 1, 1982 in Ōita) is an athlete from Japan. She competes in archery.

Matsushita represented Japan at the 2004 Summer Olympics. She placed 35th in the women's individual ranking round with a 72-arrow score of 624. In the first round of elimination, she faced 30th-ranked Alexandra Fouace of France. Matsushita defeated Fouace, winning 165-157 in the 18-arrow match to advance to the round of 32. In that round, she faced Yun Mi Jin of South Korea, losing to the 3rd-ranked archer 173-149 as Yun tied the Olympic record for an 18-arrow match. Matsushita finished 28th in women's individual archery.

Matsushita was also a member of the 14th-place Japanese women's archery team.
