= Alexandra Fouace =

French archer (born 1979)

Alexandra Fouace (born 7 July 1979) is a French athlete who competed in archery at the 2000 and 2004 Summer Olympics.

In 2004, she was 30th in the women's individual ranking round with a 72-arrow score of 627. In the first round of elimination, she faced 35th-ranked Sayami Matsushita of Japan. Fouace lost 165–157 in the 18-arrow match, placing 34th overall in women's individual archery. She was also a member of the 4th-place French team in the women's team archery competition.
