= Kristine Esebua =

Georgian and Canadian archer (born 1985)

Personal information
- Nationality: Canadian; Georgian
- Born: March 19, 1985 (age 41) Khobi, Georgia

Sport
- Sport: Archery
Medal record
Women's recurve archery
Representing Georgia
World Championships
Silver medal – second place	2011 Copenhagen	Individual

Kristine Esebua (Georgian: ქრისტინე ესებუა; born 19 March 1985, Khobi) is a Georgian-born Canadian archer. She has competed at four Olympic Games in archery.

In 2019, Esebua was forced to leave Georgia and moved to Toronto, Canada.

== Career ==
=== Georgia ===
2004 Summer Olympics

Esebua represented Georgia at the 2004 Summer Olympics. She placed 22nd in the women's individual ranking round with a 72-arrow score of 636. In the first round of elimination, she faced 43rd-ranked Reena Kumari of India. Esebua lost 153–149 in the 18-arrow match, falling to 40th overall in women's individual archery.

2008 Summer Olympics

At the 2008 Summer Olympics in Beijing Esebua finished her ranking round with a total of 643 points. This gave her the 17th seed for the final competition bracket in which she faced Yuki Hayashi in the first round. Both archers scored 102 points in the regular match and a decisive extra round had to make the difference. In this extra round Esebua scored nine points and Hayashi eight, giving Esebua the ticket to the second round. There she hit another 102 points, but her opponent Elpida Romantzi did the same and yet again the match had to be decided with an extra round. This time it was Romantzi who advanced to the next round as she hit ten points against nine of Esebua who was eliminated.

2012 Summer Olympics

At the 2012 Summer Olympics, Esebua was 34th after the ranking round. She beat Denisse van Lamoen in the first round, before losing to Lee Sung-Jin in the second.

2016 Summer Olympics

Esebua represented Georgia at the 2016 Summer Olympics in Rio de Janeiro.

=== Canada ===
After arriving in Canada, Esebua gave birth to twins and returned to competition in 2023. In April 2024, Esebua earned Canada an individual Olympics quota for the 2024 Summer Olympics.
