= Reena Kumari (archer) =

Indian archer

Medal record

Women's recurve archery

Representing India

Asian Championships
Bronze medal – third place	2005 New Delhi	Team

Reena Kumari (born 15 January 1984) is an athlete from India who competes in archery.

Kumari represented India at the 2004 Summer Olympics. She placed 43rd in the women's individual ranking round with a 72-arrow score of 620. In the first round of elimination, she faced 22nd-ranked Kristine Esebua of Georgia. Kumari pulled off a surprising upset, defeating Esebua 153–149 in the 18-arrow match to advance to the round of 32. In that round, she faced Bhutanese archer Tshering Chhoden. Kumari won the match in a 7–4 tie-breaker after a 134–134 tie in the regulation 18 arrows, advancing to the round of 16. She then lost to 6th-ranked Yuan Shu Chi of Chinese Taipei 166–148, finishing 15th in women's individual archery.

Kumari was also a member of the 8th-place Indian women's archery team.
