= Yukari Kawasaki =

Japanese archer (born 1976)

Personal information
- Nationality: Japanese
- Born: December 14, 1976 (age 49) Aomori Prefecture, Japan

Sport
- Sport: Archery

Yukari Kawasaki (河﨑 由加里, Kawasaki Yukari; born December 14, 1976 in Aomori) is an athlete from Japan. She competes in archery.

Kawasaki represented Japan at the 2004 Summer Olympics. She placed 37th in the women's individual ranking round with a 72-arrow score of 622. In the first round of elimination, she faced 28th-ranked Iwona Marcinkiewicz of Poland. Kawasaki lost 119–106 in the 18-arrow match, placing 63rd overall in women's individual archery.

Kawasaki was also a member of the 14th-place Japanese women's archery team.

== Link ==
- 2004Japan Olympic Committee
