= Małgorzata Sobieraj =

Polish archer

Małgorzata Sobieraj, formerly Ćwienczek (2005–2011) (born 16 October 1982 in Strzelin) is a Polish archer. She represented Poland at the 2004 and 2008 Summer Olympics.

== 2004 Summer Olympics ==
Sobieraj represented Poland at the 2004 Summer Olympics under her maiden name. She placed 27th in the women's individual ranking round with a 72-arrow score of 628. In the first round of elimination, she faced 38th-ranked Daw Thin Thin Khaing of Myanmar. Sobieraj defeated Daw Thin in a tight match, tying the score at 151 after the regulation 18 arrows and matching Daw Thin arrow for arrow through the three tie-breaking arrows. Sobieraj's final arrow was slightly closer to the target, giving her the win and allowing her to advance to the round of 32. In that round, she faced Yuan Shu Chi of Chinese Taipei, losing to the 6th-ranked and eventual semifinalist archer 158-149 in the regulation 18 arrows. Sobieraj finished 29th in women's individual archery. Sobieraj was also a member of the 15th-place Polish women's archery team.

== 2008 Summer Olympics ==
At the 2008 Summer Olympics in Beijing Ćwienczek finished her ranking round with a total of 645 points. This gave her the 13th seed for the final competition bracket in which she faced Louise Larsen in the first round, beating the archer from Denmark with 113-100. In the second round she came close, but was eliminated by 20th seed Mariana Avitia with 110-109. Together with Justyna Mospinek and Iwona Marcinkiewicz she also took part in the team event. With her 645 score from the ranking round combined with the 643 of Mospinek and the 620 of Marcinkiewicz the Polish team was in fourth position after the ranking round, which gave them a straight seed into the quarter-final. There they were beaten by the French team with 218-211. The French eventually won the bronze medal.
