= Lin Sang =

Chinese archer (born 1977)

Personal information
- Born: August 17, 1977 (age 49) Putian, Fujian, China
- Height: 168 cm (5 ft 6 in)
- Weight: 65 kg (143 lb)
Medal record
Women's recurve archery
Representing China
Olympic Games
Silver medal – second place	2004 Athens	Team
World Championships
Silver medal – second place	1999 Riom	Team
Asian Games
Gold medal – first place	1994 Hiroshima	Team
Silver medal – second place	1998 Bangkok	Team
Bronze medal – third place	1998 Bangkok	Individual
Asian Championships
Gold medal – first place	2003 Yangon	Individual
Silver medal – second place	2003 Yangon	Team
Summer Universiade
Silver medal – second place	2003 Daegu	Team

Lin Sang (Chinese: 林桑; pinyin: Lín Sāng; born August 17, 1977, in Putian, Fujian) is an archer from the People's Republic of China.

Lin represented China at the 2004 Summer Olympics. She placed 11th in the women's individual ranking round with a 72-arrow score of 647. In the first round of elimination, she faced 54th-ranked Tshering Chhoden of Bhutan. In a major upset, Lin lost 159–156 in the 18-arrow match, placing only 36th overall in women's individual archery.

She also competed at the 1994 Asian Games winning a gold medal in the team event, at the 1998 Asian Games winning a silver medal in the team event and a bronze in the individual and at the 1999 World Archery Championships where she won a silver medal in the team event.
