= Iwona Marcinkiewicz =

Polish archer (born 1975)

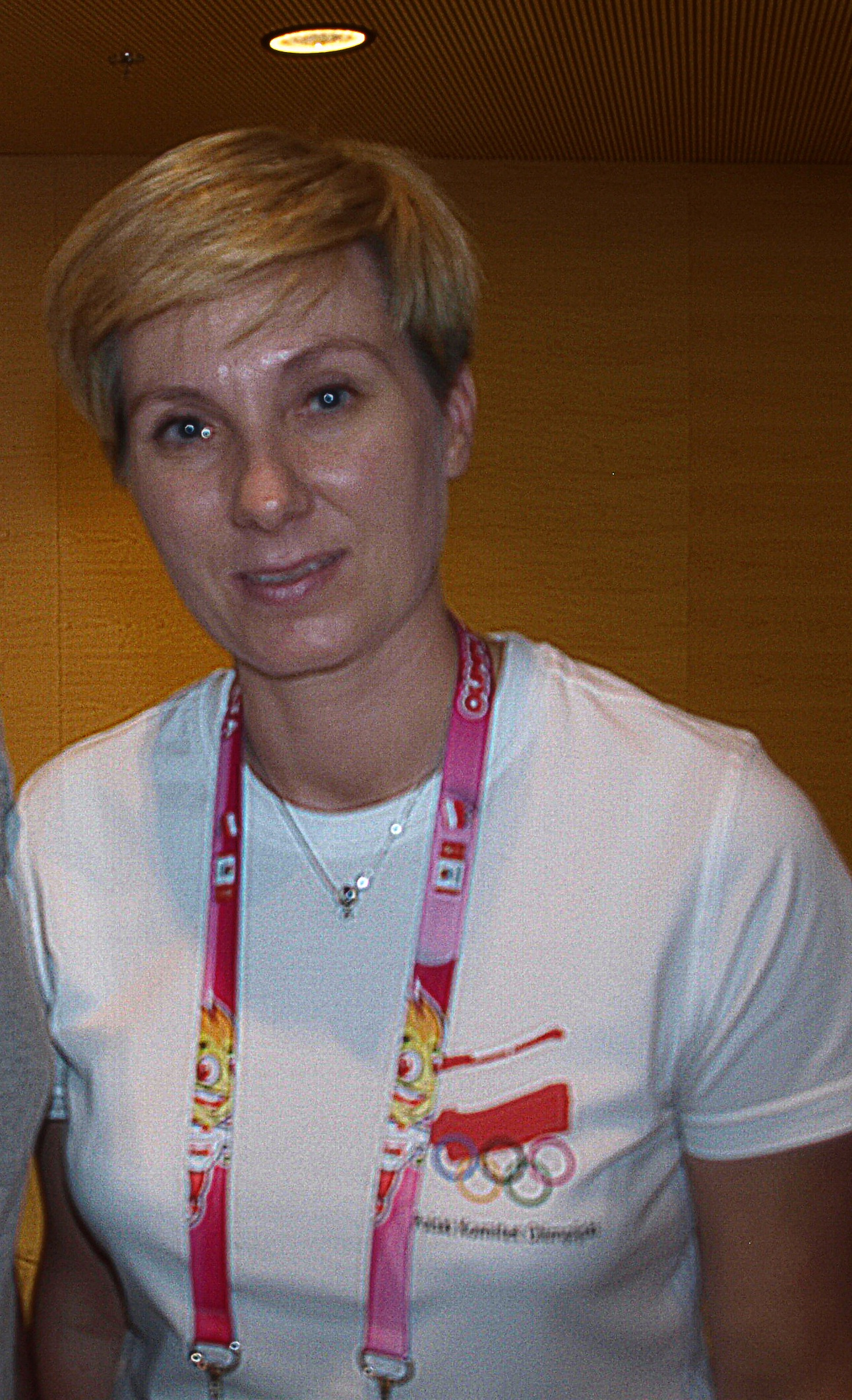

Medal record

Women's Archery

Representing Poland

Olympic Games
| Bronze medal – third place | 1996 Atlanta | Team competition |

Iwona Marcinkiewicz (Polish pronunciation: [iˈvɔna mart͡ɕinˈkʲevʲit͡ʂ]; born Iwona Dzięcioł, 23 May 1975 in Warsaw) is an athlete from Poland. She competes in archery.

Marcinkiewicz represented Poland at the 1996 Summer Olympics, 2004 Summer Olympics and 2008 Summer Olympics.

For her sport achievements, she received:
Silver Cross of Merit in 1996.

== 1996 Summer Olympics ==
At 1996 Summer Olympics she placed 57th in the women's individual ranking round with a 72-arrow score of 599. In the first round of elimination, she faced 8th-ranked Kim Kyung-Wook of Korea and lost 157-164 in the 18-arrow match to the future Olympic gold medalist. Dzięcioł finished 33rd in women's individual archery. In team competition, together with Joanna Nowicka and Katarzyna Klata, she defeated Russia 233-229. Then in the quarterfinals, her team defeated Ukraine 242-235. In the semifinals, her Polish team lost to Korea 237-245. In the third place match, Marcinkiewicz's team defeated Turkey 244-139, winning a bronze medal.

== 2004 Summer Olympics ==
At 2004 Summer Olympics she placed 28th in the women's individual ranking round with a 72-arrow score of 628. In the first round of elimination, she faced 37th-ranked Yukari Kawasaki of Japan. Marcinkiewicz defeated Kawasaki, winning 119-106 in the 18-arrow match to advance to the round of 32. In that round, she faced Zhang Juanjuan of China, losing to the 5th-ranked archer 166-157 in the regulation 18 arrows. She finished 20th in women's individual archery. Marcinkiewicz was also a member of the 15th-place Polish women's archery team, together with Justyna Mospinek and Małgorzata Sobieraj.

== 2008 Summer Olympics ==
At the 2008 Summer Olympics in Beijing Marcinkiewicz finished her ranking round with a total of 620 points. This gave her the 43rd seed for the final competition bracket in which she faced Laishram Bombaya Devi in the first round, beating the 22nd seed archer from India with 103-101. She came close to beat 11th seed Natalia Erdyniyeva in the second round, but 103 points was not enough against her 104 score. Together with Małgorzata Ćwienczek and Justyna Mospinek she also took part in the team event. With her 620 score from the ranking round combined with the 645 of Ćwienczek and the 643 of Marcinkiewicz the Polish team was in fourth position after the ranking round, which gave them a straight seed into the quarter-final. There they were beaten by the French team with 218-211. The French eventually won the bronze medal.
