= Anna Mrozińska =

Polish rhythmic gymnast

Personal information
- Born: 25 November 1985 (age 40) Gdynia, Poland

Sport
- Sport: Rhythmic Gymnastics

Anna Mrozińska (born 25 November 1985) is a retired Polish rhythmic gymnast who competed at the 2004 Olympics and the 2003 Gymnastic World Championship She retired from her professional career in 2006.

== Coaching career ==
Anna Mrozińska is currently coaching Natalia Koziol, who is an emerging Polish gymnast.
