= Brazil at the 2016 Summer Olympics =

- IOC code: BRA
- NOC: Brazilian Olympic Committee
- Website: www.cob.org.br (in Portuguese)

in Rio de Janeiro
- Competitors: 465 in 29 sports
- Flag bearers: Yane Marques (opening); Isaquias Queiroz (closing)
- Medals Ranked 13th: Gold 7 Silver 6 Bronze 6 Total 19

Summer Olympics appearances (overview)
- 1920; 1924; 1928; 1932; 1936; 1948; 1952; 1956; 1960; 1964; 1968; 1972; 1976; 1980; 1984; 1988; 1992; 1996; 2000; 2004; 2008; 2012; 2016; 2020; 2024; 2028

Brazil was the host nation of the 2016 Summer Olympics in Rio de Janeiro from 5 to 21 August 2016. This was the nation's twenty-second appearance at the Summer Olympics, having competed in all editions in the modern era from 1920 onwards, except the 1928 Summer Olympics in Amsterdam. Setting a milestone in Olympic history, Brazil became the first South American country to host the Summer Olympics, and the second Latin American host following the 1968 Summer Olympics in Mexico.

In this edition, Brazil beat both its previous highest number of gold medals obtained at one Olympics until this games (five gold medals in Athens 2004), and its record of total medals won at a Games (17 medals in Beijing 2008 and London 2012). Brazil won gold for the first time in two sports: boxing (Robson Conceição in men's lightweight) and football (men's team). It was also the first time a Brazilian athlete won three medals at one Games: Isaquias Queiroz in canoeing (two silvers and one bronze). Brazil also won its first ever medals in canoeing sprint, the silver that Queiroz won in C1-1000 m was the first in that sport.

== Summary ==
The shooter Felipe Wu, won the first Brazilian medal in the Rio de Janeiro Games. Wu came very close to taking the top spot on the podium in the men's 10 m air pistol with 202.1 points, but the Vietnamese Hoàng Xuân Vinh hit a brilliant final shot and won the gold medal with an Olympic Record of 202.5 points. The silver medal Felipe Wu won was the first Brazilian medal in Shooting since the Guilherme Paraense at Antwerp 1920 Olympics.

The first Brazilian gold medal was won by the judoka Rafaela Silva in the women's 57 kg . Rafaela Silva beat Wazari the Mongolian Sumiya Dorjsuren, the incumbent leader of the world ranking, in the final. The other 2 medals in judo were bronze. Mayra Aguiar and Rafael Silva repeated the same results obtained in London / 2012 achieved third places respectively in women's 78 kg and men's +100 kg events.

In gymnastics, three medals were won by Brazil. Diego Hypólito was the silver medalist and Arthur Mariano won the bronze in men's floor. Diego redeemed himself from falls in Beijing and London, when he was a favorite to win a medal, and finally won his first Olympic medal with a note 15.533. Arthur Mariano was the surprise of the competition by earning the bronze with a note 15.433. The gold medal was won by the British Max Whitlock with a note 15.633. In the men's rings, Arthur Zanetti the incumbent gold medalist in London, again made a great presentation in the rings and with a note of 15.766 to win the silver medal; the Greek Eleftherios Petrounias won gold with a note of 16.000.

The swimmer Poliana Okimoto became the first Brazilian woman in history to obtain an Olympic medal in swimming. Originally she finished in fourth place in the Women's 10 km open water, but later was upgraded to the bronze medal with a time of 1:56:51.4 after the disqualification of the French swimmer Aurélie Muller.

In athletics, perhaps the most positively unexpected results happened for the host nation in men's pole vault. The jumper Thiago Braz da Silva won the second gold medal for Brazil in Rio de Janeiro in a thrilling duel with French pole-vaulter Renaud Lavillenie, the world record holder and gold medalist in then current olympic champion. In the final, Lavillenie and Braz were the only two athletes to achieve the high of 5.93m and consequently they were the only two left to dispute the gold medal. Lavillenie managed to clear the next height, 5.98m, easily with his first attempt, but da Silva decided to skip 5.98m and went on to 6.03m. With a successful second attempt at 6.03m, da Silva set a new Olympic Record. Lavillenie, having failed his first two attempts at 6.03m, attempted 6.08 with his final jump but failed, knocking the bar off with his knee. Thiago Braz da Silva won the gold medal with an Olympic record and surpassing his personal best performance in 10 cm, despite never having won a medal in a senior global competition.

In canoeing, the first Olympic medals ever were won by Brazilians in the history of the sport. Isaquias Queiroz was the first Brazilian athlete in history to win three medals (two silver medals and one bronze) at a single Olympic Games, and the first sprint canoe athlete from any nationality to do so in the history of the Olympics. The first silver medal came in the men's C-1 1000 m. After a duel with German Olympic and world champion Sebastian Brendel, Isaquias Queiroz managed to keep up the pace and climbed the podium with the second fastest time (3m58s529). The bronze medal came in men's C-1 200 m with a time of 39s628. Queiroz's third medal came in men's C-2 1000 metres, together with Erlon Silva. They stayed in the lead for most of the time of race, but they were surpassed in the final meters by Germans Sebastian Brendel and Jan Vandrey and took the silver medal with a time of 3m44s819.

The third gold medal obtained by the host country was in boxing. Robson Conceição has made history on his home turf by becoming the first Brazilian boxer to take a gold medal. Conceição defeated France's Sofiane Oumiha in the men's lightweight final with a unanimous decision. Conceição's achievement was particularly inspiring given his humble upbringing and after being defeated in his first fights in Beijing and London.

The sailors Martine Grael and Kahena Kunze took the country's fourth gold medal in women's 49erFX. They were the first Brazilian women sailor to win a gold Olympic medal. The competition was tight. The duos representing Brazil, Denmark, and Spain were tied when they reached the final, followed by the New Zealanders one point below. The podium would be defined by their positions on the final race. Martine Grael and Kahena Kunze took the gold, New Zealanders Alex Maloney and Molly Meech the silver, and Denmark's Jena Mai Hansen and Katja Salskov-Iversen the bronze. Martine Grael continued the tradition of her family in sailing at the Olympics: her father Torben Grael is five-time Olympic medalist (twice gold) and her uncle Lars Grael is a twice bronze medalist.

In beach volleyball, Brazilians took two medals. Ágatha Bednarczuk and Bárbara Seixas defeated in the semifinal the reigning Olympic champion Kerri Walsh Jennings and April Ross, the first defeat of Kerri Walsh after 26 Olympic matches; in the final of the women's beach volleyball tournament, the Brazilians lost to Laura Ludwig and Kira Walkenhorst of Germany by 2 to 0 and took the silver medal in the sands of Copacabana Beach. In the men's beach volleyball tournament, came the fifth gold medal. Alison Cerutti and Bruno Schmidt beat the Italians Paolo Nicolai and Daniele Lupo in straight sets, 21–19, 21–17. While this was the first Olympic medal for Bruno Schmidt, Alison took in London/2012 the silver medal with then-partner Emanuel Rego.

In taekwondo, a bronze medal was won by Maicon Siqueira in men's +80 kg category. He was the first Brazilian man ever to gain an Olympic medal in taekwondo. In a dramatic bronze medal dispute, he beat the British Mahama Cho at the last seconds by 5 to 4 and won the bronze medal.

Finally, in the last two days of the competitions, two gold medals were won in the two most popular sports in Brazil. In the men's football tournament, the gold medal was won by Brazil national under-23 football team, ending a bad sequence of results with three silver medals four years before in London, Seoul 1988 and Los Angeles 1984. In the campaign that began with suspicion after two scoreless draws with South Africa and Iraq, the team easily defeat Denmark, Colombia and Honduras until they reached the gold medal match against Germany. In the final at Maracanã Stadium, there was a 1–1 draw, in which Neymar scored in the normal time. In the penalties shoot-out, after eight flawless kicks, until the goalkeeper Weverton defend the penalty shot by Nils Petersen. Neymar converted the decisive penalty, so the Brazil team won the penalty shoot-out by 5 to 4 and won the gold medal for the first time in Olympic history, in one of the most iconic moments of the 2016 Summer Olympics.

The seventh gold medal and last medal won by the host nation in the 2016 Summer Olympics was in the men's indoor volleyball. Coached by Bernardo Rezende, the Brazil men's national volleyball team had two defeats in the preliminary round, needing a victory against France in the last match to avoid elimination. After that, Brazil defeat Argentina in the quarter-finals and Russia in the semifinals. Brazil reached their fourth consecutive final – the sixth in history – and re-edited the 2004 gold decision against Italy. After two consecutive silver medals, Brazil triumphed the gold medal match by 3 to 0. Among the volleyball players Bruno Rezende, coach Bernardo Rezende's son won his third consecutive Olympic medal and Sérgio Santos became the Brazilian team sports athlete with the most medals, as he participated in every men's indoor final since Athens 2004.

== Medalists ==
Medal	Name	Sport	Event	Date
Gold	Rafaela Silva	Judo	Women's 57 kg	8 August
Gold	Thiago Braz	Athletics	Men's pole vault	15 August
Gold	Robson Conceição	Boxing	Men's lightweight	16 August
Gold	Martine Grael; Kahena Kunze	Sailing	49erFX	18 August
Gold	Alison Cerutti; Bruno Schmidt	Volleyball	Men's beach volleyball	18 August
Gold	Brazil national under-23 football team: Weverton; Zeca; Rodrigo Caio; Marquinhos; Renato Augusto; Douglas Santos; Luan; Rafinha; Gabriel; Neymar; Gabriel Jesus; Walace; William; Luan Garcia; Rodrigo Dourado; Thiago Maia; Felipe Anderson; Uilson	Football	Men's tournament	20 August
Gold	Brazil men's national volleyball team: Bruno Rezende; Éder Carbonera; Wallace de Souza; William Arjona; Sérgio Santos; Luiz Felipe Fonteles; Maurício Souza; Douglas Souza; Lucas Saatkamp; Evandro Guerra; Ricardo Lucarelli Souza; Maurício Borges Silva	Volleyball	Men's tournament	21 August
Silver	Felipe Wu	Shooting	Men's 10 m air pistol	6 August
Silver	Diego Hypólito	Gymnastics	Men's floor	14 August
Silver	Arthur Zanetti	Gymnastics	Men's rings	15 August
Silver	Isaquias Queiroz	Canoeing	Men's C-1 1000 m	16 August
Silver	Ágatha Bednarczuk; Bárbara Seixas	Volleyball	Women's beach volleyball	17 August
Silver	Isaquias Queiroz; Erlon Silva	Canoeing	Men's C-2 1000 metres	20 August
Bronze	Mayra Aguiar	Judo	Women's 78 kg	11 August
Bronze	Rafael Silva	Judo	Men's +100 kg	12 August
Bronze	Arthur Mariano	Gymnastics	Men's floor	14 August
Bronze	Poliana Okimoto	Swimming	Women's 10 km open water	15 August
Bronze	Isaquias Queiroz	Canoeing	Men's C-1 200 m	18 August
Bronze	Maicon Siqueira	Taekwondo	Men's +80 kg	20 August

Medals by sport
Sport	1st place, gold medalist(s)	2nd place, silver medalist(s)	3rd place, bronze medalist(s)	Total
Volleyball	2	1	0	3
Judo	1	0	2	3
Athletics	1	0	0	1
Boxing	1	0	0	1
Football	1	0	0	1
Sailing	1	0	0	1
Canoeing	0	2	1	3
Gymnastics	0	2	1	3
Shooting	0	1	0	1
Swimming	0	0	1	1
Taekwondo	0	0	1	1
Total	7	6	6	19

Medals by date
Date	1st place, gold medalist(s)	2nd place, silver medalist(s)	3rd place, bronze medalist(s)	Total
6 Aug	0	1	0	1
7 Aug	0	0	0	0
8 Aug	1	0	0	1
9 Aug	0	0	0	0
10 Aug	0	0	0	0
11 Aug	0	0	1	1
12 Aug	0	0	1	1
13 Aug	0	0	0	0
14 Aug	0	1	1	2
15 Aug	1	1	1	3
16 Aug	1	1	0	2
17 Aug	0	1	0	1
18 Aug	2	0	1	3
19 Aug	0	0	0	0
20 Aug	1	1	1	3
21 Aug	1	0	0	1
Total	7	6	6	19

Medals by gender
Gender	1st place, gold medalist(s)	2nd place, silver medalist(s)	3rd place, bronze medalist(s)	Total
Male	5	5	4	14
Female	2	1	2	5
Mixed	0	0	0	0
Total	7	6	6	19

=== Multiple medallist ===
The following competitor won several medals at the 2016 Olympic Games.

Name	Medal	Sport	Event
Isaquias Queiroz	Silver; Silver; Bronze	Canoeing	Men's C-1 1000 metres Men's C-2 1000 metres Men's C-1 200 metres

== Competitors ==
The following is the list of number of competitors participating in the games. Note that reserves in fencing, field hockey, football, and handball are not counted:

Sport	Men	Women	Total
Archery	3	3	6
Athletics	36	31	67
Badminton	1	1	2
Basketball	12	12	24
Boxing	7	2	9
Canoeing	11	2	13
Cycling	6	4	10
Diving	5	4	9
Equestrian	10	2	12
Fencing	7	6	13
Field hockey	16	0	16
Football	18	18	36
Golf	1	2	3
Gymnastics	6	11	17
Handball	14	14	28
Judo	7	7	14
Modern pentathlon	1	1	2
Rowing	2	2	4
Rugby sevens	12	12	24
Sailing	8	7	15
Shooting	6	3	9
Swimming	23	13	36
Synchronized swimming	—	9	9
Table tennis	3	3	6
Taekwondo	2	2	4
Tennis	5	2	7
Triathlon	1	1	2
Volleyball	16	16	32
Water polo	13	13	26
Weightlifting	3	2	5
Wrestling	1	4	5
Total	256	209	465

== Archery ==
Brazil fielded a team of six archers (three men and three women) at the 2016 Olympics, as the host nation is automatically entitled to use these places. The archery team was named to the Olympic roster on 12 July 2016.

Men

Athlete	Event	Ranking round		Round of 64	Round of 32	Round of 16	Quarterfinals	Semifinals	Final / BM	
Athlete	Event	Score	Seed	Opposition Score	Opposition Score	Opposition Score	Opposition Score	Opposition Score	Opposition Score	Rank
Marcus Vinicius D'Almeida	Individual	658	34	Kaminski (USA); L 2–6	Did not advance					
Bernardo Oliveira	Individual	651	45	Potts (AUS); W 6–4	Soto (CHI); L 1–7	Did not advance				
Daniel Xavier	Individual	639	53	Lee S-y (KOR); L 2–6	Did not advance					
Marcus Vinicius D'Almeida; Bernardo Oliveira; Daniel Xavier	Team	1948	11	—N/a		China; L 2–6	Did not advance			

Women

Athlete	Event	Ranking round		Round of 64	Round of 32	Round of 16	Quarterfinals	Semifinals	Final / BM	
Athlete	Event	Score	Seed	Opposition Score	Opposition Score	Opposition Score	Opposition Score	Opposition Score	Opposition Score	Rank
Ane Marcelle dos Santos	Individual	637	26	Nagamine (JPN); W 7–3	Ingley (AUS); W 6–0	Folkard (GBR); L 2–6	Did not advance			
Marina Canetta	Individual	599	54	Qi Yh (CHN); L 1–7	Did not advance					
Sarah Nikitin	Individual	609	50	Kang U-j (PRK); L 0–6	Did not advance					
Ane Marcelle dos Santos; Marina Canetta; Sarah Nikitin	Team	1845	11	—N/a		Italy; L 0–6	Did not advance			

== Athletics ==
In athletics, the Brazilian team did not receive any automatic places for representing the host nation, as they had done in some other sports. To qualify for the Games, Brazilian athletes must achieve entry standards in the following athletics events (up to a maximum of three athletes in each event): On 16 April 2015, after the release of entry standards from IAAF, the first seven athletes (four in marathon and three in race walk) have officially registered to compete for the Games. The athletics team was named to the final Olympic roster on 3 July 2016. On 13 July, Vanessa Spínola was added to roster after an IAAF decision to complete the quota of participants in the heptathlon.

Key

- Note–Ranks given for track events are within the athlete's heat only
- Q = Qualified for the next round
- NR = National record
- N/A = Round not applicable for the event
- Bye = Athlete not required to compete in round
- NM = No mark

=== Track & road events ===
Men

Athlete	Event	Heat		Quarterfinal		Semifinal		Final	
Athlete	Event	Result	Rank	Result	Rank	Result	Rank	Result	Rank
Vitor Hugo dos Santos	100 m	Bye		10.36	=5	Did not advance			
Jorge Vides	200 m	20.50	3	—N/a		Did not advance			
Bruno de Barros	200 m	20.59	6	—N/a		Did not advance			
Aldemir da Silva Junior	200 m	20.80	7	—N/a		Did not advance			
Hederson Estefani	400 m	46.68	7	—N/a		Did not advance			
Kléberson Davide	800 m	1:46.14	4 Q	—N/a		1:46.19	6	Did not advance	
Lutimar Paes	800 m	1:48.38	7	—N/a		Did not advance			
Thiago André	1500 m	3:44.42	11	—N/a		Did not advance			
Éder Antônio Souza	110 m hurdles	13.61	4 Q	—N/a		DSQ		Did not advance	
João Vítor de Oliveira	110 m hurdles	13.63	4 Q	—N/a		13.85	9	Did not advance	
Mahau Suguimati	400 m hurdles	49.77	3 Q	—N/a		49.77	8	Did not advance	
Marcio Teles	400 m hurdles	50.41	6	—N/a		Did not advance			
Moacir Zimmermann	20 km walk	—N/a						1:33:58	63
José Alessandro Bagio	20 km walk	—N/a						DNF	
Caio Bonfim	20 km walk	—N/a						1:19:42 NR	4
Caio Bonfim	50 km walk	—N/a						3:47:02 NR	9
Mário dos Santos	50 km walk	—N/a						DNF	
Jonathan Rieckmann	50 km walk	—N/a						4:01.52	29
Altobeli da Silva	3000 m steeplechase	8:26.59	6 Q	—N/a				8:26.30	9
Solonei da Silva	Marathon	—N/a						2:22:05	78
Marílson dos Santos	Marathon	—N/a						2:19:09	59
Paulo Roberto Paula	Marathon	—N/a						2:13:56	15
Aldemir da Silva Junior; Vitor Hugo dos Santos; Bruno de Barros; Ricardo Mário de Souza; José Carlos Moreira; Jorge Vides	4 × 100 m relay	38.19	5 Q	—N/a				38.41	6
Lucas Carvalho; Pedro Luiz de Oliveira; Hugo de Sousa; Peterson dos Santos; Hederson Estefani; Alexander Russo	4 × 400 m relay	3:00.43	4 Q	—N/a				3:03.28	8

Women

Athlete	Event	Heat		Quarterfinal		Semifinal		Final	
Athlete	Event	Result	Rank	Result	Rank	Result	Rank	Result	Rank
Rosângela Santos	100 m	Bye		11.25	2 Q	11.23	5	Did not advance	
Franciela Krasucki	100 m	Bye		11.67	7	Did not advance			
Kauiza Venancio	200 m	23.06	3	—N/a		Did not advance			
Vitória Cristina Rosa	200 m	23.35	7	—N/a		Did not advance			
Geisa Coutinho	400 m	52.05	4	—N/a		Did not advance			
Jailma de Lima	400 m	52.65	6	—N/a		Did not advance			
Flávia de Lima	800 m	2:03.78	8	—N/a		Did not advance			
Maíla Machado	100 m hurdles	13.09	5	—N/a		Did not advance			
Fabiana Moraes	100 m hurdles	13.22	5	—N/a		Did not advance			
Juliana Paula dos Santos	3000 m steeplechase	9:45.95	15	—N/a				Did not advance	
Tatiele de Carvalho	10000 m	—N/a						32:38.21	31
Érica de Sena	20 km walk	—N/a						1:29:29	7
Cisiane Lopes	20 km walk	—N/a						1:38:35	49
Adriana Aparecida da Silva	Marathon	—N/a						2:43:22	69
Marily dos Santos	Marathon	—N/a						2:45:08	78
Graciete Santana	Marathon	—N/a						3:09:15	128
Bruna Farias; Franciela Krasucki; Ana Cláudia Lemos; Vitória Cristina Rosa; Rosângela Santos; Kauiza Venâncio	4 × 100 m relay	DSQ		—N/a				Did not advance	
Geisa Coutinho; Tabata Vitorino de Carvalho; Jailma de Lima; Letícia de Souza; Cristiane dos Santos Silva; Joelma Sousa	4 × 400 m relay	3:30.27	8	—N/a				Did not advance	

=== Field events ===
Men

Athlete	Event	Qualification		Final	
Athlete	Event	Distance	Position	Distance	Position
Higor Alves	Long jump	7.59	28	Did not advance	
Thiago Braz	Pole vault	5.70	3 Q	6.03 OR, SA	1st place, gold medalist(s)
Augusto de Oliveira	Pole vault	5.45	22	Did not advance	
Talles Frederico Silva	High jump	2.17	35	Did not advance	
Júlio César de Oliveira	Javelin throw	80.49	16	Did not advance	
Wagner Domingos	Hammer throw	74.17	9 Q	72.28	12
Darlan Romani	Shot put	20.94 NR	3 Q	21.02 NR	5

Women

Athlete	Event	Qualification		Final	
Athlete	Event	Distance	Position	Distance	Position
Eliane Martins	Long jump	6.33	23	Did not advance	
Keila Costa	Long jump	5.86	38	Did not advance	
Keila Costa	Triple jump	13.78	24	Did not advance	
Núbia Soares	Triple jump	13.85	23	Did not advance	
Fabiana Murer	Pole vault	NM	—	Did not advance	
Joana Costa	Pole vault	4.15	=29	Did not advance	
Geisa Arcanjo	Shot put	18.27	7 Q	18.16	9
Andressa de Morais	Discus throw	57.38	21	Did not advance	
Fernanda Martins	Discus throw	51.85	31	Did not advance	

Combined events – Men's decathlon

Athlete	Event	100 m	LJ	SP	HJ	400 m	110H	DT	PV	JT	1500 m	Final	Rank
Luiz Alberto de Araújo	Result	10.77	7.48 PB	15.26	1.92	48.14 PB	14.17	45.10	4.90	57.28 PB	4:31.46	8315 PB	10
Luiz Alberto de Araújo	Points	912	930	806	731	902	953	769	880	697	735	8315 PB	10

Combined events – Women's heptathlon

Athlete	Event	100H	HJ	SP	200 m	LJ	JT	800 m	Final	Rank
Vanessa Spínola	Result	14.24	1.68	13.06	24.11	6.10	45.05	2:14.20	6024	23
Vanessa Spínola	Points	945	830	731	970	880	764	904	6024	23

== Badminton ==
Brazil fielded a squad of two badminton players (one male and one female) at the 2016 Olympics, as the host nation was automatically entitled to use these places, making the nation's official sporting debut in Olympic history.

Men

Athlete	Event	Group Stage			Elimination	Quarterfinal	Semifinal	Final / BM	
Athlete	Event	Opposition Score	Opposition Score	Rank	Opposition Score	Opposition Score	Opposition Score	Opposition Score	Rank
Ygor Coelho de Oliveira	Men's singles	Evans (IRL); L (8–21, 21–19, 8–21)	Zwiebler (GER); L (12–21, 12–21)	3	Did not advance				

Women

Athlete	Event	Group Stage			Elimination	Quarterfinal	Semifinal	Final / BM	
Athlete	Event	Opposition Score	Opposition Score	Rank	Opposition Score	Opposition Score	Opposition Score	Opposition Score	Rank
Lohaynny Vicente	Women's singles	Nehwal (IND); L (17–21, 17–21)	Ulitina (UKR); L (13–21,13–21)	3	Did not advance				

== Basketball ==
Summary

Team	Event	Group Stage						Quarterfinal	Semifinal	Final / BM	
Team	Event	Opposition Score	Opposition Score	Opposition Score	Opposition Score	Opposition Score	Rank	Opposition Score	Opposition Score	Opposition Score	Rank
Brazil men's	Men's tournament	Lithuania; L 76–82	Spain; W 66–65	Croatia; L 76–80	Argentina; L 107–111	Nigeria; W 86–69	5	Did not advance			
Brazil women's	Women's tournament	Australia; L 66–84	Japan; L 66–82	Belarus; L 63–65	France; L 64–74	Turkey; L 76–79	6	Did not advance			

=== Men's tournament ===
Brazil men's national basketball team competed as a host nation in the Olympic Basketball Tournament at the 2016 Rio Games after FIBA's Central Board decided to grant them an automatic place at its meeting in Tokyo on 9 August 2015.

Team roster

The following is the Brazil roster for the men's basketball tournament of the 2016 Summer Olympics.

Brazil men's national basketball team – 2016 Summer Olympics roster
Players
Coaches

Pos.	No.	Name	Age – Date of birth	Height	Club	Ctr.
PG	5	Raulzinho Neto	24 – 19 May 1992	1.92 m (6 ft 4 in)	Utah Jazz	(United States)
C	6	Cristiano Felício	24 – 7 July 1992	2.08 m (6 ft 10 in)	Chicago Bulls	(United States)
SG	8	Vítor Benite	26 – 20 February 1990	1.90 m (6 ft 3 in)	UCAM Murcia	(Spain)
PG	9	Marcelinho Huertas	33 – 25 May 1983	1.91 m (6 ft 3 in)	Los Angeles Lakers	(United States)
G/F	10	Alex Garcia	36 – 4 March 1980	1.92 m (6 ft 4 in)	Bauru	(Brazil)
F	12	Guilherme Giovannoni	36 – 2 June 1980	2.04 m (6 ft 8 in)	Brasília	(Brazil)
F/C	13	Nenê	33 – 13 September 1982	2.11 m (6 ft 11 in)	Houston Rockets	(United States)
SF	14	Marquinhos Vieira	32 – 31 May 1984	2.07 m (6 ft 9 in)	Flamengo	(Brazil)
SG	19	Leandro Barbosa	33 – 28 November 1982	1.94 m (6 ft 4 in)	Phoenix Suns	(United States)
F/C	23	Augusto Lima	24 – 17 September 1991	2.06 m (6 ft 9 in)	Real Madrid	(Spain)
F/C	30	Rafael Hettsheimeir	30 – 16 June 1986	2.08 m (6 ft 10 in)	Bauru	(Brazil)
PG	55	Rafael Luz	24 – 11 February 1992	1.88 m (6 ft 2 in)	Flamengo	(Brazil)

Head coach

- (Argentina) Rubén Magnano

Assistant coach(es)

- (Brazil) José Alves Neto
- (Brazil) Gustavo de Conti
- (Brazil) Demétrius Conrado Ferraciú

Legend

- Club – describes last
  club before the tournament
- Age – describes age
  on 6 August 2016

On 27 July, Anderson Varejão left the squad due to injury and was replaced by Cristiano Felício.

Group play

Pos	Team	Pld	W	L	PF	PA	PD	Pts	Qualification
1	Croatia	5	3	2	400	407	−7	8 (Note: In games among the four teams at 3–2, Croatia and Spain were 2–1 while Argentina and Lithuania were 1–2. Croatia beat Spain 72–70, and Lithuania beat Argentina 81–73.)	Quarterfinals
2	Spain	5	3	2	432	357	+75	8	Quarterfinals
3	Lithuania	5	3	2	392	428	−36	8	Quarterfinals
4	Argentina	5	3	2	441	428	+13	8	Quarterfinals
5	Brazil (H)	5	2	3	411	407	+4	7	
6	Nigeria	5	1	4	392	441	−49	6	

Source: FIBA
Rules for classification: 1) points; 2) head-to-head points; 3) head-to-head points difference; 4) head-to-head number of points scored.
(H) Hosts
Notes:

7 August 2016
14:15

Boxscore

Brazil	76–82	Lithuania
Scoring by quarter: 17–27, 12–31, 23–12, 24–12
Pts: Barbosa 21; Rebs: Nenê 8 Asts: Huertas 3		Pts: Kalnietis 16; Rebs: Jankūnas 7 Asts: Kalnietis 8

Carioca Arena 1, Rio de Janeiro
Attendance: 7,990
Referees: Eddie Viator (FRA), Steven Anderson (USA), José Reyes (MEX)

9 August 2016
14:15

Boxscore

Spain	65–66	Brazil
Scoring by quarter: 13–18, 18–16, 14–19, 20–13
Pts: Gasol 13; Rebs: Gasol 10; Asts: Rodríguez 5		Pts: Huertas 11; Rebs: Lima 10; Asts: Huertas 7

Carioca Arena 1, Rio de Janeiro
Attendance: 10,761
Referees: Ilija Belošević (SRB), Roberto Vázquez (PUR), Damir Javor (SLO)

11 August 2016
14:15

Boxscore

Brazil	76–80	Croatia
Scoring by quarter: 17–19, 14–22, 19–18, 26–21
Pts: Barbosa 16; Rebs: Lima 6 Asts: Huertas 9		Pts: Bogdanović 33; Rebs: Šarić 7 Asts: Ukić 4

Carioca Arena 1, Rio de Janeiro
Attendance: 10,756
Referees: Borys Ryzhyk (UKR), Roberto Vázquez (PUR), Oļegs Latiševs (LAT)

13 August 2016
14:15

Boxscore

Argentina	111–107 (2OT)	Brazil
Scoring by quarter: 28–19, 16–33, 23–20, 18–13, Overtime: 10–10, 16–12
Pts: Nocioni 37; Rebs: Nocioni 11; Asts: Campazzo 11		Pts: Nenê 24; Rebs: Nenê 10; Asts: Neto 4

Carioca Arena 1, Rio de Janeiro
Attendance: 11,701
Referees: Christos Christodoulou (GRE), Stephen Seibel (CAN), José Reyes (MEX)

15 August 2016
14:15

Boxscore

Nigeria	69–86	Brazil
Scoring by quarter: 16–15, 15–27, 21–17, 17–27
Pts: Akognon 16; Rebs: Aminu 7 Asts: four players 2		Pts: Nenê 19; Rebs: Nenê 7 Asts: Huertas 11

Carioca Arena 1, Rio de Janeiro
Attendance: 11,173
Referees: Ilija Belošević (SRB), Ferdinand Pascual (PHI), Robert Lottermoser (GER)

=== Women's tournament ===
Brazil women's national basketball team competed as a host nation in the Olympic Basketball Tournament at the 2016 Rio Games after FIBA's Central Board decided to grant them an automatic place at its meeting in Tokyo on 9 August 2015.

Team roster

The following is the Brazil roster for the women's basketball tournament of the 2016 Summer Olympics.

Brazil women's national basketball team – 2016 Summer Olympics roster
Players
Coaches

Pos.	No.	Name	Age – Date of birth	Height	Club	Ctr.
G	4	Adriana Moisés Pinto	37 – 6 December 1978	1.65 m (5 ft 5 in)	América Basquete	(Brazil)
G	5	Tainá Paixão	24 – 29 November 1991	1.73 m (5 ft 8 in)	América Basquete	(Brazil)
G	6	Joice Rodrigues	29 – 6 September 1986	1.76 m (5 ft 9 in)	Corinthians/Americana	(Brazil)
F	7	Palmira Marçal	32 – 20 May 1984	1.78 m (5 ft 10 in)	Sampaio Basquete	(Brazil)
G/F	8	Izi Castro Marques	34 – 13 March 1982	1.81 m (5 ft 11 in)	Sampaio Basquete	(Brazil)
F	9	Isabela Ramona	22 – 23 January 1994	1.79 m (5 ft 10 in)	Sampaio Basquete	(Brazil)
F	10	Tatiane Pacheco	25 – 16 October 1990	1.81 m (5 ft 11 in)	América Basquete	(Brazil)
C	11	Clarissa dos Santos	28 – 10 March 1988	1.84 m (6 ft 0 in)	Chicago Sky	(United States)
F	12	Damiris Dantas	23 – 17 November 1992	1.93 m (6 ft 4 in)	Corinthians/Americana	(Brazil)
C	13	Nádia Colhado	27 – 25 February 1989	1.93 m (6 ft 4 in)	Sampaio Basquete	(Brazil)
C	14	Érika de Souza	34 – 9 March 1982	1.96 m (6 ft 5 in)	Chicago Sky	(United States)
C	15	Kelly Santos	36 – 10 November 1979	1.93 m (6 ft 4 in)	América Basquete	(Brazil)

Head coach

- (Brazil) Antonio Carlos Barbosa

Assistant coach(es)

- (Brazil) Cristiano Cedra
- (Brazil) Júlio César Patrício

Legend

- Club – describes last
  club before the tournament
- Age – describes age
  on 6 August 2016

Group play

Pos	Team	Pld	W	L	PF	PA	PD	Pts	Qualification
1	Australia	5	5	0	400	345	+55	10	Quarter-finals
2	France	5	3	2	344	343	+1	8 (Note: Head-to-head record: France 3 pts, +8 PD; Turkey 3 pts, −2 PD; Japan 3 pts, −6 PD)	Quarter-finals
3	Turkey	5	3	2	324	325	−1	8	Quarter-finals
4	Japan	5	3	2	386	378	+8	8	Quarter-finals
5	Belarus	5	1	4	347	361	−14	6	
6	Brazil (H)	5	0	5	335	384	−49	5	

Source: FIBA
Rules for classification: 1) points; 2) head-to-head points; 3) head-to-head points difference; 4) head-to-head number of points scored.
(H) Hosts
Notes:

6 August 2016
17:30

Boxscore

Brazil	66–84	Australia
Scoring by quarter: 24–14, 15–21, 14–22, 13–27
Pts: Castro Marques 25; Rebs: dos Santos 13; Asts: Pinto 7		Pts: Cambage 20; Rebs: Cambage 14; Asts: Mitchell 6

Youth Arena, Rio de Janeiro
Attendance: 2,368
Referees: Ilija Belošević (SRB), Karen Lasuik (CAN), Piotr Pastusiak (POL)

8 August 2016
17:30

Boxscore

Japan	82–66	Brazil
Scoring by quarter: 19–20, 28–13, 26–19, 9–14
Pts: Tokashiki 23; Rebs: Tokashiki 9 Asts: Yoshida 11		Pts: Castro Marques 20; Rebs: Dos Santos 16; Asts: Pinto 6

Youth Arena, Rio de Janeiro
Attendance: 2,624
Referees: José Reyes (MEX), Carlos Peruga (ESP), Nadege Zouzou (CIV)

9 August 2016
15:30

Boxscore

Brazil	63–65	Belarus
Scoring by quarter: 28–16, 12–19, 10–15, 13–15
Pts: Dantas 23; Rebs: Dos Santos 11; Asts: Pinto 4		Pts: Troina 18; Rebs: Leuchanka, Verameyenka 6 Asts: Harding 6

Youth Arena, Rio de Janeiro
Attendance: 2,075
Referees: Sreten Radović (CRO), Natalia Cuello (DOM), Leandro Lezcano (ARG)

11 August 2016
15:30

Boxscore

France	74–64	Brazil
Scoring by quarter: 20–20, 15–9, 22–19, 17–16
Pts: Skrela 18; Rebs: Gruda 10; Asts: Époupa 7		Pts: Dantas 21; Rebs: Dos Santos 10; Asts: three players 5

Youth Arena, Rio de Janeiro
Attendance: 3,128
Referees: Juan Carlos García (ESP), Karen Lasuik (CAN), Ferdinand Pascual (PHI)

13 August 2016
15:30

Boxscore

Turkey	79–76 (2OT)	Brazil
Scoring by quarter: 8–15, 12–21, 21–11, 19–13, Overtime: 10–10, 9–6
Pts: Sanders 23; Rebs: Sanders 10; Asts: Alben 5		Pts: Castro 22; Rebs: Dos Santos 12; Asts: Castro 8

Youth Arena, Rio de Janeiro
Attendance: 3,075
Referees: Juan Carlos García (ESP), Hwang In-tae (KOR), Piotr Pastusiak (POL)

== Boxing ==
Brazil has been guaranteed five male boxers at the Games and one female entrant by virtue of being the host nation. At the 2015 World Championships, Robson Conceição had claimed one of the reserved places for the team, allowing its unused "host nation" berth to be redistributed to the rest of the boxers under the Americas continent in the lightweight division. Five other boxers (four men and one woman) were invited by the Brazilian Confederation to use the special "host" vacancies for the Games, while Juan Nogueira and Andreia Bandeira had claimed their Olympic spots on the Brazilian team at the 2016 American Qualification Tournament in Buenos Aires, Argentina.

Men

Athlete	Event	Round of 32	Round of 16	Quarterfinals	Semifinals	Final	
Athlete	Event	Opposition Result	Opposition Result	Opposition Result	Opposition Result	Opposition Result	Rank
Patrick Lourenço	Light flyweight	Martínez (COL); L 0–3	Did not advance				
Julião Henriques Neto	Flyweight	Vargas (USA); L 0–2	Did not advance				
Robenílson de Jesus	Bantamweight	Hammachi (ALG); W 2–1	Stevenson (USA); L 0–3	Did not advance			
Robson Conceição	Lightweight	Bye	Yunusov (TJK); W TKO	Tojibaev (UZB); W 3–0	Álvarez (CUB); W 3–0	Oumiha (FRA); W 3–0	1st place, gold medalist(s)
Joedison Teixeira	Light welterweight	Chadi (ALG); W 2–1	Gözgeç (TUR); L 0–3	Did not advance			
Michel Borges	Light heavyweight	N'Jikam (CMR); W 3–0	Sep (CRO); W 3–0	La Cruz (CUB); L 0–3	Did not advance		
Juan Nogueira	Heavyweight	Whateley (AUS); W 3–0	Tishchenko (RUS); L 0–3	Did not advance			

Women

Athlete	Event	Round of 16	Quarterfinals	Semifinals	Final	
Athlete	Event	Opposition Result	Opposition Result	Opposition Result	Opposition Result	Rank
Adriana Araújo	Lightweight	Potkonen (FIN); L 1–2	Did not advance			
Andreia Bandeira	Middleweight	Bylon (PAN); W 2–1	Li Q (CHN); L 0–3	Did not advance		

== Canoeing ==
=== Slalom ===
As the host nation, Brazil qualified the maximum of one boat in all four classes. The slalom canoeing team, highlighted by London 2012 Olympian and 2015 Pan American Games silver medalist Ana Sátila, was named to the host nation's roster on 21 June 2016.

Men

Athlete	Event	Preliminary						Semifinal		Final	
Athlete	Event	Run 1	Rank	Run 2	Rank	Best	Rank	Time	Rank	Time	Rank
Felipe Borges	Men's C-1	122.30	19	105.14	14	105.14	16	Did not advance			
Charles Corrêa; Anderson Oliveira	Men's C-2	107.71	7	106.14	4	106.14	7 Q	116.49	11	Did not advance	
Pedro da Silva	Men's K-1	88.48	2	90.61	7	88.48	5 Q	95.68	10 Q	91.54	6

Women

Athlete	Event	Preliminary						Semifinal		Final	
Athlete	Event	Run 1	Rank	Run 2	Rank	Best	Rank	Time	Rank	Time	Rank
Ana Sátila	Women's K-1	110.80	12	149.12	17	110.80	17	Did not advance			

=== Sprint ===
Being the host nation, Brazil was allocated a place each in the men's K-1 1000 m, and the women's K-1 500 m, but the team earned a healthy number of quota places. Hence, two more boats were added to the team roster through the 2015 ICF Canoe Sprint World Championships, and another set of two through the 2016 Pan American Sprint Qualifier. The sprint canoeing team was named to the Olympic roster on 28 June 2016. On 18 July, the men's K-4 1000 m was added, after the exclusion of boats of Romania and Belarus.

Men

Athlete	Event	Heats		Semifinals		Final	
Athlete	Event	Time	Rank	Time	Rank	Time	Rank
Isaquias Queiroz	C-1 200 m	40.522	2 Q	39.659	1 FA	39.628	3rd place, bronze medalist(s)
Isaquias Queiroz	C-1 1000 m	3:59.615	1 FA	Bye		3:58.529	2nd place, silver medalist(s)
Edson Silva	K-1 200 m	35.665	7	Did not advance			
Isaquias Queiroz; Erlon Silva	C-2 1000 m	3:33.269	1 FA	Bye		3:44.819	2nd place, silver medalist(s)
Gilvan Ribeiro; Edson Silva	K-2 200 m	33.021	5 Q	33.359	4 FB	33.992	10
Roberto Maehler; Celso Oliveira; Gilvan Ribeiro; Vagner Souta	K-4 1000 m	3:04.804	6 Q	3:09.220	6 FB	3:13.337	13

Women

Athlete	Event	Heats		Semifinals		Final	
Athlete	Event	Time	Rank	Time	Rank	Time	Rank
Ana Paula Vergutz	K-1 200 m	44.239	6 Q	44.362	8	Did not advance	
Ana Paula Vergutz	K-1 500 m	2:00.680	6	Did not advance			

Qualification Legend: FA = Qualify to medal final; FB = Qualify to non-medal final

== Cycling ==
=== Road ===
As the host nation, Brazil was entitled to enter four cyclists, two men and two women, in the Olympic road race, in the event that they may have failed to qualify through the 2015 UCI World Tour, and may have finished outside the top 20 individual and top 5 national ranking in the 2015 UCI America Tour. The road cycling team was named to the host nation's Olympic roster on 9 June 2016, with Murilo Fischer riding on the men's road race at his fifth straight Games.

Athlete	Event	Time	Rank
Murilo Fischer	Men's road race	OTL	
Kléber Ramos	Men's road race	Did not finish	
Clemilda Fernandes	Women's road race	OTL	
Flávia Oliveira	Women's road race	3:51:47	7

=== Track ===
Following the completion of the 2016 UCI Track Cycling World Championships, Brazil entered one rider to compete in the men's omnium at the Olympics, by virtue of his final individual UCI Olympic ranking in that event. This signified the nation's Olympic comeback to the track cycling for the first time since 1992.

Omnium

Athlete	Event	Scratch race		Individual pursuit			Elimination race		Time trial			Flying lap			Points race		Total points	Rank
Athlete	Event	Rank	Points	Time	Rank	Points	Rank	Points	Time	Rank	Points	Time	Rank	Points	Points	Rank	Total points	Rank
Gideoni Monteiro	Men's omnium	14	14	4:25.808	9	24	6	30	1:05.505	16	10	13.569	15	12	4	9	94	13

=== Mountain biking ===
As a host nation, Brazil had been awarded a single place each in the men's and women's cross-country race at the Olympics, but the mountain bikers had secured two men's and one women's quota place each, as a result of the nation's thirteenth-place finish each per gender in the UCI Olympic Ranking List of 25 May 2016, giving the unused "host" vacancies to the next highest-ranked eligible nations, not yet qualified. The mountain biking team was announced two days after the list had been released.

Athlete	Event	Time	Rank
Henrique Avancini	Men's cross-country	1:41:18	23
Rubens Donizete	Men's cross-country	1:44:01	30
Raiza Goulão	Women's cross-country	1:39:21	20

=== BMX ===
As a host nation, Brazil had been awarded a single place each in the men's and women's BMX race at the Olympics, but the BMX riders had secured one men's and one women's quota place each, as a result of the nation's twelfth-place finish for men in the UCI Olympic Ranking List of 31 May 2016, and top two for women, not yet qualified, at the 2016 UCI BMX World Championships in Medellín, Colombia.

Athlete	Event	Seeding		Quarterfinal		Semifinal		Final	
Athlete	Event	Result	Rank	Points	Rank	Points	Rank	Result	Rank
Renato Rezende	Men's BMX	35.404	16	19	7	Did not advance			
Priscilla Carnaval	Women's BMX	37.534	15	—N/a		22	8	Did not advance	

== Diving ==
Brazil, as the host nation, was automatically entitled to places in all synchronized diving events, but athletes for individual events must qualify through their own performances.

Men

Athlete	Event	Preliminaries		Semifinals		Final	
Athlete	Event	Points	Rank	Points	Rank	Points	Rank
César Castro	3 m springboard	398.85	14 Q	442.45	6 Q	436.00	9
Hugo Parisi	10 m platform	422.45	13 Q	417.15	16	Did not advance	
Ian Matos; Luiz Outerelo	3 m synchronized springboard	—N/a				332.61	8
Hugo Parisi; Jackson Rondinelli	10 m synchronized platform	—N/a				368.52	8

Women

Athlete	Event	Preliminaries		Semifinals		Final	
Athlete	Event	Points	Rank	Points	Rank	Points	Rank
Juliana Veloso	3 m springboard	240.90	27	Did not advance			
Ingrid Oliveira	10 m platform	281.90	22	Did not advance			
Tammy Takagi; Juliana Veloso	3 m synchronized springboard	—N/a				258.75	8
Ingrid Oliveira; Giovanna Pedroso	10 m synchronized platform	—N/a				280.98	8

== Equestrian ==
Brazil, as the host nation, automatically received a team and a maximum number of four riders in each of the three disciplines: dressage, eventing, and jumping. The Brazilian equestrian team was named to the Olympic roster on 18 July 2016.

=== Dressage ===
Athlete	Horse	Event	Grand Prix		Grand Prix Special		Grand Prix Freestyle		Overall	
Athlete	Horse	Event	Score	Rank	Score	Rank	Technical	Artistic	Score	Rank
Luiza de Almeida	Vendaval	Individual	66.914	49	Did not advance					
Pedro de Almeida	Xaparro do Vouga	Individual	65.714	53	Did not advance					
João Victor Marcari Oliva	Xamã dos Pinhais	Individual	68.071	46	Did not advance					
Giovanna Pass	Zingaro de Lyw	Individual	67.700	47	Did not advance					
Luiza de Almeida; Pedro de Almeida; João Victor Marcari Oliva; Giovanna Pass	See above	Team	67.562	10	Did not advance		—N/a		67.562	10

=== Eventing ===
Athlete	Horse	Event	Dressage		Cross-country			Jumping						Total	
Athlete	Horse	Event	Dressage		Cross-country			Qualifier			Final			Total	
Athlete	Horse	Event	Penalties	Rank	Penalties	Total	Rank	Penalties	Total	Rank	Penalties	Total	Rank	Penalties	Rank
Márcio Appel	Iberon Jmen	Individual	57.20 #	59	64.40	121.60	39	16.00	137.60	39	Did not advance			137.60	39
Ruy Fonseca	Tom Bombadill Too	Individual	46.80	26	112.00 #	158.80 #	47	Eliminated			Did not advance				
Márcio Jorge	Lissy Mac Wayer	Individual	50.00	44	20.00	70.00	24	10.00	80.00	22	8.00	88.00	25	88.00	25
Carlos Paro	Summon Up The Blood	Individual	47.30	33	4.00	51.30	7	12.00	63.30	12	12.00	75.30	18	75.30	18
Márcio Appel; Ruy Fonseca; Márcio Jorge; Carlos Paro	See above	Team	144.10	9	88.40	242.90	6	38.00	280.90	7	—N/a			280.90	7

"#" indicates that the score of this rider does not count in the team competition, since only the best three results of a team are counted.

=== Jumping ===
Athlete	Horse	Event	Qualification								Final					Total	
Athlete	Horse	Event	Round 1		Round 2			Round 3			Round A		Round B			Total	
Athlete	Horse	Event	Penalties	Rank	Penalties	Total	Rank	Penalties	Total	Rank	Penalties	Rank	Penalties	Total	Rank	Penalties	Rank
Stephan Barcha	Landpeter do Feroleto	Individual	0	=1 Q	DSQ			Did not advance									
Álvaro de Miranda Neto	Cornetto K	Individual	0	=1 Q	0	0	=1 Q	4	4	=7 Q	4	=16 Q	0	4	=9	4	=9
Eduardo Menezes	Quintol	Individual	4 #	=27 Q	0	4	=15 Q	4	8	=18 Q	8	=28	Did not advance				
Pedro Veniss	Quabri de L'Isle	Individual	0	=1 Q	0	0	=1 Q	5	5	=13 Q	4	=16 Q	1	5	=16	5	=16
Stephan Barcha; Álvaro de Miranda Neto; Eduardo Menezes; Pedro Veniss	See above	Team	0	=1	0	—N/a	=1 Q	13	13	5	—N/a					13	5

"#" indicates that the score of this rider does not count in the team competition, since only the best three results of a team are counted.

== Fencing ==
Brazil was guaranteed eight fencers at the Games by virtue of being the host nation. Following the 2016 FIE World Cup meet in Bonn, Germany, the men's foil team claimed the spot as the highest ranking team from America outside the world's top four in the FIE Official Olympic Rankings. Meanwhile, Renzo Agresta, who has been set to appear at his fourth Olympics (men's sabre), and Nathalie Moellhausen, who previously represented Italy in London 2012 (women's foil), earned more places on the Brazilian team as one of the two highest-ranked individual fencers coming from the America zone in the FIE Adjusted Official Rankings.

Eight other fencers (three each in the men's and women's épée teams and two individuals in women's foil and sabre, respectively), were invited by the Brazilian Confederation to use the special "host" vacancies for the Games, extending the roster size to thirteen.

Men

Athlete	Event	Round of 64	Round of 32	Round of 16	Quarterfinal	Semifinal	Final / BM	
Athlete	Event	Opposition Score	Opposition Score	Opposition Score	Opposition Score	Opposition Score	Opposition Score	Rank
Nicolas Ferreira	Épée	F Limardo (VEN); L 7–15	Did not advance					
Guilherme Melaragno	Épée	Jiao Yl (CHN); L 13–15	Did not advance					
Athos Schwantes	Épée	Beran (CZE); W 8–6	Grumier (FRA); L 7–15	Did not advance				
Nicolas Ferreira; Guilherme Melaragno; Athos Schwantes	Team épée	—N/a		Venezuela; L 25–45	Did not advance			9
Henrique Marques	Foil	Essam (EGY); L 8–15	Did not advance					
Ghislain Perrier	Foil	Bye	Ma Jf (CHN); L 14–15	Did not advance				
Guilherme Toldo	Foil	Pranz (AUT); W 15–14	Ota (JPN); W 15–13	Cheung K L (HKG); W 15–10	Garozzo (ITA); L 8–15	Did not advance		
Henrique Marques; Ghislain Perrier; Guilherme Toldo	Team foil	—N/a			Italy; L 27–45	Placement 5–8; China; L 41–43	7th place Egypt; L 39–45	8
Renzo Agresta	Sabre	—N/a	Bazadze (GEO); L 3–15	Did not advance				

Women

Athlete	Event	Round of 64	Round of 32	Round of 16	Quarterfinal	Semifinal	Final / BM	
Athlete	Event	Opposition Score	Opposition Score	Opposition Score	Opposition Score	Opposition Score	Opposition Score	Rank
Rayssa Costa	Épée	Géroudet (SUI); W 15–13	Besbes (TUN); L 8–15	Did not advance				
Nathalie Moellhausen	Épée	Bye	Hurley (USA); W 15–12	Candassamy (FRA); W 15–12	Rembi (FRA); L 12–15	Did not advance		
Amanda Simeão	Épée	Candassamy (FRA); L 6–15	Did not advance					
Rayssa Costa; Nathalie Moellhausen; Amanda Simeão; Katherine Miller	Team épée	—N/a		Ukraine; L 32–45	Did not advance			9
Bia Bulcão	Foil	Călugăreanu (ROU); W 15–12	Deriglazova (RUS); L 6–15	Did not advance				
Taís Rochel	Foil	Al-Omair (KSA); W 15–0	Shanaeva (RUS); L 13–15	Did not advance				
Marta Baeza	Sabre	Jóźwiak (POL); L 2–4	Did not advance					

== Field hockey ==
Summary

Key:

- FT – After full time.
- P – Match decided by penalty-shootout.

Team	Event	Group Stage						Quarterfinal	Semifinal	Final / BM	
Team	Event	Opposition Score	Opposition Score	Opposition Score	Opposition Score	Opposition Score	Rank	Opposition Score	Opposition Score	Opposition Score	Rank
Brazil men's	Men's tournament	Spain; L 0–7	Belgium; L 0–12	Great Britain; L 1–9	New Zealand; L 0–9	Australia; L 0–9	6	Did not advance			12

=== Men's tournament ===
As the host nation, Brazil men's field hockey team qualified for the Olympics by virtue of obtaining a world ranking equal to or better than thirtieth place by the end of 2014, or not finish lower than sixth at the 2015 Pan American Games.

Team roster

The following is the Brazil roster in the men's field hockey tournament of the 2016 Summer Olympics.

Head coach: Sidney Rocha

1. Thiago Bomfim (GK)
2. Bruno Mendonça
5. Joaquín Lopez
6. Adam Imer
7. André Patrocínio (C)
8. Yuri van der Heijden
9. Stephane Vehrle-Smith
10. Matheus Borges
11. Lucas Paixão
13. Bruno Paes
14. Ernst Rost-Onnes
15. Patrick van der Heijden
19. Rodrigo Steimbach
23. Christopher McPherson
27. Paulo Batista Junior
31. Rodrigo Faustino (GK)

Reserves:

- Marcos Pasin
- Augusto Felipe

Group play

Pos	Team	Pld	W	D	L	GF	GA	GD	Pts	Qualification
1	Belgium	5	4	0	1	21	5	+16	12	Quarter-finals
2	Spain	5	3	1	1	13	6	+7	10	Quarter-finals
3	Australia	5	3	0	2	13	4	+9	9	Quarter-finals
4	New Zealand	5	2	1	2	17	8	+9	7	Quarter-finals
5	Great Britain	5	1	2	2	14	10	+4	5	
6	Brazil (H)	5	0	0	5	1	46	−45	0	

Source: Rio2016
Rules for classification: 1) Points; 2) Matches won; 3) Goal difference; 4) Goals for; 5) Head-to-head result.
(H) Hosts

6 August 2016
19:30

Spain	7–0	Brazil
Lleonart 16', 42'; Oliva 35'; Romeu 35', 52'; Ruiz 45'; Alegre 55'	Report

Umpires:
Marcin Grochal (POL)
Chen Dekang (CHN)

7 August 2016
19:30

Brazil	0–12	Belgium
	Report	Van Aubel 12'; Van Doren 14', 54'; Cosyns 18', 53'; Denayer 25'; Truyens 28'; Boccard 33'; Briels 33'; Dockier 41'; Charlier 48'; Dohmen 51'

Umpires:
Germán Montes de Oca (ARG)
Javed Shaikh (IND)

9 August 2016
18:00

Brazil	1–9	Great Britain
Smith 4'	Report	Dixon 9'; Middleton 12', 54'; Jackson 27', 57'; Martin 37'; Ward 47', 59'; Gleghorne 56'

Umpires:
Chen Dekang (CHN)
Coen van Bunge (NED)

10 August 2016
19:30

New Zealand	9–0	Brazil
Wilson 15', 19', 34', 41'; Shay 21'; Child 26'; Russell 30'; Jenness 45'; Woods 58'	Report

Umpires:
Javed Shaikh (IND)
Coen van Bunge (NED)

12 August 2016
20:30

Australia	9–0	Brazil
Dwyer 7', 9'; Gohdes 11'; Turner 20', 24', 27'; Dawson 35'; Govers 45', 59'	Report

Umpires:
Javed Shaikh (IND)
Lim Hong Zhen (SIN)

=== Women's tournament ===
The Brazil women's national field hockey team did not qualify to the Olympic tournament, as they did not place higher than fortieth in the FIH World Rankings by the end of 2014 nor finished no worse than seventh at the 2015 Pan American Games (they did not even qualify for that tournament). This restriction was decided between the International Hockey Federation (FIH) and the International Olympic Committee (IOC) due to the standard of field hockey in Brazil.

== Football ==
Summary

Key:

- A.E.T – After extra time.
- P – Match decided by penalty-shootout.

Team	Event	Group Stage				Quarterfinal	Semifinal	Final / BM	
Team	Event	Opposition Score	Opposition Score	Opposition Score	Rank	Opposition Score	Opposition Score	Opposition Score	Rank
Brazil men's	Men's tournament	South Africa; D 0–0	Iraq; D 0–0	Denmark; W 4–0	1 Q	Colombia; W 2–0	Honduras; W 6–0	Germany; W 5–4^{P} 1–1 (a.e.t.)	1st place, gold medalist(s)
Brazil women's	Women's tournament	China; W 3–0	Sweden; W 5–1	South Africa; D 0–0	1 Q	Australia; W 7–6^{P} 0–0 (a.e.t.)	Sweden; L 3–4^{P} 0–0 (a.e.t.)	Canada; L 1–2	4

=== Men's tournament ===
The Brazil men's football team automatically qualified for the Olympics as the host nation.

Team roster

The following was the Brazil squad in the men's football tournament of the 2016 Summer Olympics. The team of 18 players was officially named on 29 June and confirmed on 14 July. On 31 July, Fernando Prass left the squad due to an elbow injury and was replaced by Weverton.

Head coach: Rogério Micale

No.	Pos.	Player	Date of birth (age)	Caps	Goals	Club
1	GK	Weverton*	13 December 1987 (aged 28)	0	0	(Brazilian Football Confederation) Atlético Paranaense
2	DF	Zeca	16 May 1994 (aged 22)	6	0	(Brazilian Football Confederation) Santos
3	DF	Rodrigo Caio	17 August 1993 (aged 22)	6	0	(Brazilian Football Confederation) São Paulo
4	DF	Marquinhos	14 May 1994 (aged 22)	0	2	(French Football Federation) Paris Saint-Germain
5	MF	Renato Augusto*	8 February 1988 (aged 28)	0	1	(Chinese Football Association) Beijing Guoan
6	DF	Douglas Santos	22 March 1994 (aged 22)	4	0	(Brazilian Football Confederation) Atlético Mineiro
7	FW	Luan Vieira	27 March 1993 (aged 23)	4	4	(Brazilian Football Confederation) Grêmio
8	MF	Rafinha	12 February 1993 (aged 23)	5	1	(Royal Spanish Football Federation) Barcelona
9	FW	Gabriel Barbosa	30 August 1996 (aged 19)	5	2	(Brazilian Football Confederation) Santos
10	FW	Neymar* (c)	5 February 1992 (aged 24)	7	5	(Royal Spanish Football Federation) Barcelona
11	FW	Gabriel Jesus	3 April 1997 (aged 19)	6	3	(Brazilian Football Confederation) Palmeiras
12	MF	Walace	4 April 1995 (aged 21)	0	0	(Brazilian Football Confederation) Grêmio
13	DF	William	3 April 1995 (aged 21)	0	0	(Brazilian Football Confederation) Internacional
14	DF	Luan Garcia	10 May 1993 (aged 23)	5	0	(Brazilian Football Confederation) Vasco da Gama
15	MF	Rodrigo Dourado	17 June 1994 (aged 22)	1	0	(Brazilian Football Confederation) Internacional
16	MF	Thiago Maia	23 March 1997 (aged 19)	2	0	(Brazilian Football Confederation) Santos
17	FW	Felipe Anderson	15 April 1993 (aged 23)	7	0	(Italian Football Federation) Lazio
18	GK	Uilson	28 April 1994 (aged 22)	0	0	(Brazilian Football Confederation) Atlético Mineiro

* Over-aged player.

Group play

Pos	Team	Pld	W	D	L	GF	GA	GD	Pts	Qualification
1	Brazil (H)	3	1	2	0	4	0	+4	5	Quarter-finals
2	Denmark	3	1	1	1	1	4	−3	4	Quarter-finals
3	Iraq	3	0	3	0	1	1	0	3	
4	South Africa	3	0	2	1	1	2	−1	2	

Source: Rio2016 & FIFA
Rules for classification: Tiebreakers
(H) Hosts
4 August 2016
16:00

Brazil	0–0	South Africa
	Report (Rio2016); Report (FIFA)

Estádio Nacional Mané Garrincha, Brasília
Attendance: 69,389
Referee: Antonio Mateu Lahoz (Spain)

7 August 2016
22:00

Brazil	0–0	Iraq
	Report (Rio2016); Report (FIFA)

Estádio Nacional Mané Garrincha, Brasília
Attendance: 65,829
Referee: Ovidiu Hațegan (Romania)

10 August 2016
22:00

Denmark	0–4	Brazil
	Report (Rio2016); Report (FIFA)	Gabriel 26', 80'; Jesus 40'; Luan Vieira 50'

Itaipava Arena Fonte Nova, Salvador
Attendance: 41,067
Referee: Alireza Faghani (Iran)

Quarterfinal

13 August 2016
22:00

Brazil	2–0	Colombia
Neymar 12'; Luan Vieira 83'	Report (Rio2016); Report (FIFA)

Arena Corinthians, São Paulo
Attendance: 41,560
Referee: Cüneyt Çakır (Turkey)

Semifinal

17 August 2016
13:00

Brazil	6–0	Honduras
Neymar 1', 90+1' (pen.); Gabriel Jesus 26', 35'; Marquinhos 51'; Luan Vieira 79'	Report (Rio2016); Report (FIFA)

Maracanã Stadium, Rio de Janeiro
Attendance: 52,457
Referee: Ovidiu Hațegan (Romania)

Gold medal match

20 August 2016
17:30

Brazil	1–1 (a.e.t.)	Germany
Neymar 27'	Report (Rio2016); Report (ESPN)	Meyer 59'
Penalties
Renato Augusto (penalty scored); Marquinhos (penalty scored); Rafinha (penalty scored); Luan Vieira (penalty scored); Neymar (penalty scored)	5–4	(penalty scored) Ginter; (penalty scored) Gnabry; (penalty scored) Brandt; (penalty scored) Süle; (penalty missed) Petersen

Maracanã Stadium, Rio de Janeiro
Attendance: 63,707
Referee: Alireza Faghani (Iran)

=== Women's tournament ===
The Brazil women's football team automatically qualified for the Olympics as the host nation.

Team roster

Head coach: Vadão

Brazil named a squad of 18 players and 4 alternates for the tournament, which was announced on 12 July 2016.

No.	Pos.	Player	Date of birth (age)	Caps	Goals	Club
1	GK	Bárbara	4 July 1988 (aged 28)	25	0	Unattached
2	DF	Fabiana	4 August 1989 (aged 26)	59	6	(Chinese Football Association) Dalian Quanjian
3	DF	Mônica	21 April 1987 (aged 29)	25	2	(United States Soccer Federation) Orlando Pride
4	DF	Rafaelle	18 June 1991 (aged 25)	8	0	(Chinese Football Association) Changchun Zhuoyue
5	MF	Thaisa	17 December 1988 (aged 27)	29	2	Unattached
6	DF	Tamires	10 October 1987 (aged 28)	35	3	(Danish Football Association) Fortuna Hjørring
7	FW	Debinha	20 October 1991 (aged 24)	6	4	(Chinese Football Association) Dalian Quanjian
8	MF	Formiga	3 March 1978 (aged 38)	138	20	Unattached
9	FW	Andressa Alves	10 November 1992 (aged 23)	39	10	(Royal Spanish Football Federation) FC Barcelona
10	MF	Marta (captain)	19 February 1986 (aged 30)	95	92	(Swedish Football Association) FC Rosengård
11	FW	Cristiane	15 May 1985 (aged 31)	109	75	(French Football Federation) Paris Saint-Germain
12	DF	Poliana	6 February 1991 (aged 25)	34	2	(United States Soccer Federation) Houston Dash
13	DF	Érika	4 February 1988 (aged 28)	49	10	(French Football Federation) Paris Saint-Germain
14	DF	Bruna	16 October 1985 (aged 30)	4	0	Unattached
15	FW	Raquel	21 March 1991 (aged 25)	22	4	(Chinese Football Association) Changchun Zhuoyue
16	FW	Beatriz	17 December 1993 (aged 22)	18	1	(Korea Football Association) Steel Red Angels
17	MF	Andressinha	1 May 1995 (aged 21)	21	7	(United States Soccer Federation) Houston Dash
18	GK	Aline	15 April 1989 (aged 27)	0	0	Unattached

Group play

Pos	Team	Pld	W	D	L	GF	GA	GD	Pts	Qualification
1	Brazil (H)	3	2	1	0	8	1	+7	7	Quarter-finals
2	China	3	1	1	1	2	3	−1	4	Quarter-finals
3	Sweden	3	1	1	1	2	5	−3	4	Quarter-finals
4	South Africa	3	0	1	2	0	3	−3	1	

Source: Rio2016 & FIFA
Rules for classification: Tiebreakers
(H) Hosts
3 August 2016
16:00

Brazil	3–0	China
Mônica 36'; Andressa 59'; Cristiane 90'	Report (Rio2016); Report (FIFA)

Estádio Olímpico João Havelange, Rio de Janeiro
Attendance: 27,618
Referee: Carol Chenard (Canada)

6 August 2016
22:00

Brazil	5–1	Sweden
Beatriz 21', 86'; Cristiane 24'; Marta 44' (pen.), 80'	Report (Rio2016); Report (FIFA); Report	Schelin 89'

Estádio Olímpico João Havelange, Rio de Janeiro
Attendance: 43,384
Referee: Lucila Venegas (Mexico)

9 August 2016
22:00 (21:00 UTC–4)

South Africa	0–0	Brazil
	Report (Rio2016); Report (FIFA)

Arena da Amazônia, Manaus
Attendance: 38,415
Referee: Stéphanie Frappart (France)

Quarterfinal

12 August 2016
22:00

Brazil	0–0 (a.e.t.)	Australia
	Report (Rio2016); Report (FIFA)
Penalties
Andressa Alves (penalty scored); Andressinha (penalty scored); Beatriz (penalty scored); Rafaelle (penalty scored); Marta (penalty missed); Debinha (penalty scored); Mônica (penalty scored); Tamires (penalty scored)	7–6	(penalty scored) Kellond-Knight; (penalty scored) Alleway; (penalty scored) Van Egmond; (penalty scored) Polkinghorne; (penalty missed) Gorry; (penalty scored) Heyman; (penalty scored) Logarzo; (penalty missed) Kennedy

Mineirão, Belo Horizonte
Attendance: 52,660
Referee: Carol Chenard (Canada)

Semifinal

16 August 2016
13:00

Brazil	0–0 (a.e.t.)	Sweden
	Report (Rio2016); Report (FIFA); Report
Penalties
Marta (penalty scored); Cristiane (penalty missed); Andressa Alves (penalty scored); Rafaelle (penalty scored); Andressinha (penalty missed)	3–4	(penalty scored) Schelin; (penalty missed) Asllani; (penalty scored) Seger; (penalty scored) Fischer; (penalty scored) Dahlkvist

Maracanã Stadium, Rio de Janeiro
Attendance: 70,454
Referee: Lucila Venegas (Mexico)

Bronze medal match

19 August 2016
13:00

Brazil	1–2	Canada
Beatriz 79'	Report (Rio2016); Report (FIFA)	Rose 25'; Sinclair 52'

Arena Corinthians, São Paulo
Attendance: 39,718
Referee: Teodora Albon (Romania)

== Golf ==
Brazil entered three golfers into the Olympic tournament. Adilson da Silva (world no. 271), and Miriam Nagl (world no. 445) qualified directly among the top 60 eligible players for their respective individual events based on the IGF World Rankings as of 11 July 2016. Meanwhile, Victoria Lovelady (world no. 458) received a spare Olympic berth freed up by the Dutch golfers, as the first replacement, to join Nagl in the women's tournament.

Athlete	Event	Round 1	Round 2	Round 3	Round 4	Total	Par	Rank
Adilson da Silva	Men's	72	71	73	69	285	+1	=39
Victoria Lovelady	Women's	79	75	76	70	300	+16	=53
Miriam Nagl	Women's	79	77	72	70	298	+14	52

== Gymnastics ==
=== Artistic ===
Brazil fielded a full squad of five gymnasts in the men's artistic gymnastics events through a top eight finish in the team all-around at the 2015 World Artistic Gymnastics Championships in Glasgow. Meanwhile, the women's team had claimed one of the remaining four spots in the team all-around at the Olympic Test Event in Rio de Janeiro. The artistic gymnastics team was named to the Olympic roster on 8 July 2016.

Men
Team

Athlete	Event	Qualification								Final							
Athlete	Event	Apparatus						Total	Rank	Apparatus						Total	Rank
Athlete	Event	F	PH	R	V	PB	HB	Total	Rank	F	PH	R	V	PB	HB	Total	Rank
Francisco Barretto Júnior	Team	13.433	14.533	14.200	14.200	14.900	15.266 Q	86.532	18*	—N/a	14.400	14.400	—N/a	14.700	15.166	—N/a	
Diego Hypólito	Team	15.500 Q	—N/a		14.816	—N/a				15.133	—N/a		14.833	—N/a		—N/a	
Arthur Mariano	Team	15.200 Q	14.433	14.033	15.100	14.933	14.766	88.465	11 Q	14.500	14.400	—N/a	15.066	14.700	14.933	—N/a	
Sérgio Sasaki	Team	14.900	14.833	14.133	15.266	14.933	14.833	88.898	8 Q	12.100	14.633	14.366	15.133	15.133	14.566	—N/a	
Arthur Zanetti	Team	—N/a		15.533 Q	—N/a					—N/a		15.566	—N/a			—N/a	
Total	Team	45.600	43.799	43.866	45.182	44.766	44.865	268.078	6 Q	41.733	43.433	44.332	45.032	44.533	44.665	263.728	6

Individual finals

Athlete	Event	Apparatus						Total	Rank
Athlete	Event	F	PH	R	V	PB	HB	Total	Rank
Francisco Barretto Júnior	Horizontal bar	—N/a					15.208	15.208	5
Diego Hypólito	Floor	15.533	—N/a					15.533	2nd place, silver medalist(s)
Arthur Mariano	All-around	15.133	13.400	14.133	14.766	14.633	15.266	87.331	17
Arthur Mariano	Floor	15.433	—N/a					15.433	3rd place, bronze medalist(s)
Sérgio Sasaki	All-around	14.833	14.766	14.433	15.200	14.966	15.000	89.198	9
Arthur Zanetti	Rings	—N/a		15.766	—N/a			15.766	2nd place, silver medalist(s)

Women
Team

Athlete	Event	Qualification						Final					
Athlete	Event	Apparatus				Total	Rank	Apparatus				Total	Rank
Athlete	Event	V	UB	BB	F	Total	Rank	V	UB	BB	F	Total	Rank
Rebeca Andrade	Team	15.566	14.933	14.200	14.033	58.732	3 Q	15.400	14.900	—N/a	12.966	—N/a	
Jade Barbosa	Team	14.900	14.266	13.600	13.733	56.499	23*	14.933	14.391	13.033	14.266	—N/a	
Daniele Hypólito	Team	—N/a		14.266	12.400	—N/a		—N/a		14.133	—N/a	—N/a	
Lorrane Oliveira	Team	14.833	14.158	—N/a				14.566	14.166	—N/a		—N/a	
Flávia Saraiva	Team	14.633	12.733	15.133 Q	14.033	56.532	17 Q	—N/a		14.833	14.500	—N/a	
Total	Team	45.299	43.357	43.599	41.799	174.054	5 Q	44.899	43.457	41.999	41.732	172.087	8

Individual finals

Athlete	Event	Apparatus				Total	Rank
Athlete	Event	V	UB	BB	F	Total	Rank
Rebeca Andrade	All-around	15.566	14.033	13.600	13.766	56.965	11
Jade Barbosa	All-around	0.000	0.000	13.700	7.500	DNF	24
Flávia Saraiva	Balance beam	—N/a		14.533	—N/a	14.533	5

=== Rhythmic ===
Brazil secured six quota places (one individual and a team of five gymnasts) in each of the following events. The rhythmic gymnastics team was named to the Olympic roster on 14 July 2016.

Athlete	Event	Qualification						Final					
Athlete	Event	Hoop	Ball	Clubs	Ribbon	Total	Rank	Hoop	Ball	Clubs	Ribbon	Total	Rank
Natália Gaudio	Individual	16.566	16.300	16.450	16.216	65.532	23	Did not advance					

Athlete	Event	Qualification				Final			
Athlete	Event	5 ribbons	3 clubs 2 hoops	Total	Rank	5 ribbons	3 clubs 2 hoops	Total	Rank
Gabrielle da Silva; Morgana Gmach; Emanuelle Lima; Jessica Maier; Francielly Pereira	Team	15.766	16.883	32.649	9	Did not advance			

=== Trampoline ===
Brazil was guaranteed one quota place as host nation.

Athlete	Event	Qualification		Final	
Athlete	Event	Score	Rank	Score	Rank
Rafael Andrade	Men's	76.145	15	Did not advance	

== Handball ==
Summary

Key:

- ET: After Extra Time
- P – Match decided by penalty-shootout.

Team	Event	Group Stage						Quarterfinal	Semifinal	Final / BM	
Team	Event	Opposition Score	Opposition Score	Opposition Score	Opposition Score	Opposition Score	Rank	Opposition Score	Opposition Score	Opposition Score	Rank
Brazil men's	Men's tournament	Poland; W 34–32	Slovenia; L 28–31	Germany; W 33–30	Egypt; D 27–27	Sweden; L 19–30	3	France; L 27–34	Did not advance		7
Brazil women's	Women's tournament	Norway; W 31–28	Romania; W 26–13	Spain; L 24–29	Angola; W 28–24	Montenegro; W 29–23	1	Netherlands; L 23–32	Did not advance		5

=== Men's tournament ===
The Brazil men's handball team automatically qualified for the Olympics as the host nation.

Team roster

The following is the Brazilian roster in the men's handball tournament of the 2016 Summer Olympics.

Head coach: (Spain) Jordi Ribera

No.	Pos.	Name	Date of birth (age)	Height	App.	Goals	Club
1	GK	Maik Santos	6 September 1980 (aged 35)	1.80 m	206	3	(Brazil) HC Taubaté
2	CB	Henrique Teixeira	27 February 1989 (aged 27)	1.92 m	100	145	(Spain) Granollers
4	CB	João Pedro Silva	29 January 1994 (aged 22)	1.90 m	50	99	(France) Chambéry Savoie
9	RW	Lucas Cândido	19 March 1989 (aged 27)	1.82 m	55	107	(Brazil) HC Taubaté
10	RB	José Toledo	11 January 1994 (aged 22)	1.93 m	53	119	(Poland) Wisła Płock
13	CB	Diogo Hubner	30 January 1983 (aged 33)	1.88 m	94	135	(Brazil) São Caetano
11	LB	Thiagus dos Santos	25 January 1989 (aged 27)	1.99 m	0	0	(Hungary) MOL-Pick Szeged
17	P	Alexandro Pozzer	21 December 1988 (aged 27)	1.92 m	61	79	(Spain) Puerto Sagunto
19	RW	Fábio Chiuffa	10 March 1989 (aged 27)	1.87 m	103	221	(Denmark) KIF Kolding Copenhagen
26	RB	Oswaldo Guimarães	23 October 1989 (aged 26)	1.83 m	47	68	(Spain) Villa de Aranda
28	LB	Leonardo Santos	3 May 1994 (aged 22)	1.92 m	21	38	(Spain) Ademar León
33	LW	André Soares	13 February 1984 (aged 32)	1.90 m	51	85	(Brazil) HC Taubaté
37	LB	Haniel Langaro	7 March 1995 (aged 21)	1.96 m	21	41	(Spain) Ciudad de Logroño
89	GK	César Almeida	6 January 1989 (aged 27)	1.87 m	59	0	(Spain) Granollers

Group play

Pos	Team	Pld	W	D	L	GF	GA	GD	Pts	Qualification
1	Germany	5	4	0	1	153	141	+12	8 (Note: Slovenia 25–28 Germany)	Quarter-finals
2	Slovenia	5	4	0	1	137	126	+11	8	Quarter-finals
3	Brazil (H)	5	2	1	2	141	150	−9	5	Quarter-finals
4	Poland	5	2	0	3	139	140	−1	4	Quarter-finals
5	Egypt	5	1	1	3	129	143	−14	3	
6	Sweden	5	1	0	4	132	131	+1	2	

Source: IHF
Rules for classification: 1) Points; 2) Head-to-head points; 3) Head-to-head goal difference; 4) Head-to-head goals scored; 5) Goal difference; 6) Goals scored; 7) Draw.
(H) Hosts
Notes:

7 August 2016; 16:40	Poland	32–34	Brazil	Future Arena, Rio de Janeiro; Referees: Nachevski, Nikolov (MKD)
7 August 2016; 16:40	Daszek 8	(13–16)	Toledo 7	Future Arena, Rio de Janeiro; Referees: Nachevski, Nikolov (MKD)
7 August 2016; 16:40	4× (yellow card) 5× (suspension)	Report	3× (yellow card) 6× (suspension)	Future Arena, Rio de Janeiro; Referees: Nachevski, Nikolov (MKD)

9 August 2016; 16:40	Brazil	28–31	Slovenia	Future Arena, Rio de Janeiro; Referees: Gjeding, Hansen (DEN)
9 August 2016; 16:40	Chiuffa 8	(13–16)	Janc 6	Future Arena, Rio de Janeiro; Referees: Gjeding, Hansen (DEN)
9 August 2016; 16:40	2× (yellow card) 6× (suspension)	Report	2× (yellow card) 13× (suspension)	Future Arena, Rio de Janeiro; Referees: Gjeding, Hansen (DEN)

11 August 2016; 16:40	Brazil	33–30	Germany	Future Arena, Rio de Janeiro; Referees: Horáček, Novotný (CZE)
11 August 2016; 16:40	Chiuffa 8	(17–16)	Häfner, Reichmann 6	Future Arena, Rio de Janeiro; Referees: Horáček, Novotný (CZE)
11 August 2016; 16:40	2× (yellow card) 4× (suspension) 1× (red card)	Report	4× (yellow card) 5× (suspension) 1× (red card)	Future Arena, Rio de Janeiro; Referees: Horáček, Novotný (CZE)

13 August 2016; 16:40	Egypt	27–27	Brazil	Future Arena, Rio de Janeiro; Referees: Lah, Sok (SLO)
13 August 2016; 16:40	El-Ahmar 9	(15–13)	four players 4	Future Arena, Rio de Janeiro; Referees: Lah, Sok (SLO)
13 August 2016; 16:40	3× (yellow card) 7× (suspension)	Report	4× (yellow card) 2× (suspension)	Future Arena, Rio de Janeiro; Referees: Lah, Sok (SLO)

15 August 2016; 16:40	Sweden	30–19	Brazil	Future Arena, Rio de Janeiro; Referees: Santos, Fonseca (POR)
15 August 2016; 16:40	Stenmalm 6	(16–10)	Toledo 4	Future Arena, Rio de Janeiro; Referees: Santos, Fonseca (POR)
15 August 2016; 16:40	4× (yellow card) 4× (suspension)	Report	2× (yellow card) 3× (suspension)	Future Arena, Rio de Janeiro; Referees: Santos, Fonseca (POR)

Quarterfinal

17 August 2016; 10:00	Brazil	27–34	France	Future Arena, Rio de Janeiro; Referees: Horáček, Novotný (CZE)
17 August 2016; 10:00	Pozzer 8	(16–16)	Guigou 8	Future Arena, Rio de Janeiro; Referees: Horáček, Novotný (CZE)
17 August 2016; 10:00	3× (yellow card) 4× (suspension)	Report	2× (yellow card) 3× (suspension)	Future Arena, Rio de Janeiro; Referees: Horáček, Novotný (CZE)

=== Women's tournament ===
The Brazil women's handball team automatically qualified for the Olympics as the host nation.

Team roster

The following is the Brazilian roster in the women's handball tournament of the 2016 Summer Olympics.

Head coach: (Denmark) Morten Soubak

No.	Pos.	Name	Date of birth (age)	Height	App.	Goals	Club
2	P	Fabiana Diniz	13 May 1981 (aged 35)	1.83 m	205	347	(Germany) SG BBM Bietigheim
3	RW	Alexandra do Nascimento	16 September 1981 (aged 34)	1.77 m	178	703	(Hungary) Vác
4	LW	Samira Rocha	26 January 1989 (aged 27)	1.70 m	94	224	(Hungary) Kisvárda
5	P	Daniela Piedade	2 March 1979 (aged 37)	1.73 m	186	336	(Hungary) Alba Fehérvár
7	P	Tamires Morena Lima	16 May 1994 (aged 22)	1.80 m	38	20	(France) Cercle Dijon Bourgogne
8	LW	Fernanda da Silva	25 September 1989 (aged 26)	1.76 m	98	281	(Germany) SG BBM Bietigheim
9	CB	Ana Paula Belo	18 October 1987 (aged 28)	1.72 m	141	517	(Russia) Rostov-Don
10	RW	Jéssica Quintino	17 April 1991 (aged 25)	1.76 m	89	189	(Denmark) HC Odense
12	GK	Bárbara Arenhart	4 October 1986 (aged 29)	1.82 m	104	4	(Hungary) Vác
15	CB	Francielle da Rocha	6 October 1992 (aged 23)	1.64 m	58	74	(Brazil) Vegus/Guarulhos
18	LB	Eduarda Amorim	23 September 1986 (aged 29)	1.86 m	145	480	(Hungary) Győri ETO
22	RB	Mayara Moura	5 December 1986 (aged 29)	1.70 m	93	146	(Brazil) EC Pinheiros
81	RB	Deonise Cavaleiro	20 June 1983 (aged 33)	1.80 m	150	331	(Denmark) HC Odense
84	GK	Mayssa Pessoa	11 August 1984 (aged 31)	1.80 m	77	0	(North Macedonia) Vardar

Group play

Pos	Team	Pld	W	D	L	GF	GA	GD	Pts	Qualification
1	Brazil (H)	5	4	0	1	138	117	+21	8	Quarter-finals
2	Norway	5	4	0	1	141	121	+20	8	Quarter-finals
3	Spain	5	3	0	2	125	116	+9	6	Quarter-finals
4	Angola	5	2	0	3	116	128	−12	4	Quarter-finals
5	Romania	5	2	0	3	108	119	−11	4	
6	Montenegro	5	0	0	5	107	134	−27	0	

Source: IHF
Rules for classification: 1) Points; 2) Head-to-head points; 3) Head-to-head goal difference; 4) Head-to-head goals scored; 5) Goal difference; 6) Goals scored; 7) Draw.
(H) Hosts

6 August 2016; 09:30	Norway	28–31	Brazil	Future Arena, Rio de Janeiro; Attendance: 7,780; Referees: Horáček, Novotný (CZE)
6 August 2016; 09:30	Mørk 12	(16–17)	Belo 12	Future Arena, Rio de Janeiro; Attendance: 7,780; Referees: Horáček, Novotný (CZE)
6 August 2016; 09:30	2× (yellow card) 2× (suspension)	Report	2× (yellow card) 8× (suspension) 1× (red card)	Future Arena, Rio de Janeiro; Attendance: 7,780; Referees: Horáček, Novotný (CZE)

8 August 2016; 16:40	Brazil	26–13	Romania	Future Arena, Rio de Janeiro; Referees: Bonaventura, Bonaventura (FRA)
8 August 2016; 16:40	Belo 8	(14–9)	Neagu 6	Future Arena, Rio de Janeiro; Referees: Bonaventura, Bonaventura (FRA)
8 August 2016; 16:40	2× (yellow card) 2× (suspension) 1× (red card)	Report	2× (yellow card) 4× (suspension)	Future Arena, Rio de Janeiro; Referees: Bonaventura, Bonaventura (FRA)

10 August 2016; 09:30	Brazil	24–29	Spain	Future Arena, Rio de Janeiro; Referees: Koo, Lee (KOR)
10 August 2016; 09:30	da Silva 7	(12–15)	Pena 8	Future Arena, Rio de Janeiro; Referees: Koo, Lee (KOR)
10 August 2016; 09:30	3× (yellow card) 5× (suspension)	Report	4× (yellow card) 8× (suspension)	Future Arena, Rio de Janeiro; Referees: Koo, Lee (KOR)

12 August 2016; 09:30	Angola	24–28	Brazil	Future Arena, Rio de Janeiro; Referees: Røen, Arntsen (NOR)
12 August 2016; 09:30	Bernardo 8	(13–13)	Belo 7	Future Arena, Rio de Janeiro; Referees: Røen, Arntsen (NOR)
12 August 2016; 09:30	2× (yellow card) 5× (suspension)	Report	4× (yellow card) 4× (suspension)	Future Arena, Rio de Janeiro; Referees: Røen, Arntsen (NOR)

14 August 2016; 09:30	Montenegro	23–29	Brazil	Future Arena, Rio de Janeiro; Referees: Mousaviyan, Kolahdouzan (IRI)
14 August 2016; 09:30	Pavićević 6	(10–12)	Belo 6	Future Arena, Rio de Janeiro; Referees: Mousaviyan, Kolahdouzan (IRI)
14 August 2016; 09:30	4× (yellow card) 5× (suspension)	Report	3× (yellow card) 3× (suspension)	Future Arena, Rio de Janeiro; Referees: Mousaviyan, Kolahdouzan (IRI)

Quarterfinal

16 August 2016; 10:00	Brazil	23–32	Netherlands	Future Arena, Rio de Janeiro; Referees: Arntsen, Røen (NOR)
16 August 2016; 10:00	Da Silva 7	(11–12)	Polman 7	Future Arena, Rio de Janeiro; Referees: Arntsen, Røen (NOR)
16 August 2016; 10:00	4× (yellow card) 6× (suspension)	Report	3× (yellow card) 2× (suspension)	Future Arena, Rio de Janeiro; Referees: Arntsen, Røen (NOR)

== Judo ==
Brazilian judoka secured one place in each of the 14 weight divisions by virtue of hosting the Olympic tournament. The host nation's judo team for the Games was announced on 1 June 2016. Among these judokas featured reigning Olympic champion Sarah Menezes and London 2012 bronze medalists Felipe Kitadai, Rafael Silva, and Mayra Aguiar.

Men

Athlete	Event	Round of 64	Round of 32	Round of 16	Quarterfinals	Semifinals	Repechage	Final / BM	
Athlete	Event	Opposition Result	Opposition Result	Opposition Result	Opposition Result	Opposition Result	Opposition Result	Opposition Result	Rank
Felipe Kitadai	−60 kg	Bye	Khyar (FRA); W 001–000	Englmaier (GER); W 001–000	Safarov (AZE); L 000–100	Did not advance	Urozboev (UZB); L 000–100	Did not advance	7
Charles Chibana	−66 kg	Bye	Ebinuma (JPN); L 000–101	Did not advance					
Alex Pombo	−73 kg	Bye	Sai Yj (CHN); L 000–001	Did not advance					
Victor Penalber	−81 kg	Bye	Acácio (MOZ); W 100–000	Toma (UAE); L 001–101	Did not advance				
Tiago Camilo	−90 kg	Bye	Piontek (RSA); W 101–000	Mehdiyev (AZE); L 001–011	Did not advance				
Rafael Buzacarini	−100 kg	Bye	Aprahamian (URU); W 100–000	Haga (JPN); L 000–000 S	Did not advance				
Rafael Silva	+100 kg	—N/a	Pileta (HON); W 110–000	Saidov (RUS); W 100–000	Riner (FRA); L 000–010	Did not advance	Meyer (NED); W 000–000 S	Tangriev (UZB); W 001–000	3rd place, bronze medalist(s)

Women

Athlete	Event	Round of 32	Round of 16	Quarterfinals	Semifinals	Repechage	Final / BM	
Athlete	Event	Opposition Result	Opposition Result	Opposition Result	Opposition Result	Opposition Result	Opposition Result	Rank
Sarah Menezes	−48 kg	Bye	van Snick (BEL); W 001–000	Mestre (CUB); L 000–000 S	Did not advance	Mönkhbat (MGL); L 000–100	Did not advance	7
Érika Miranda	−52 kg	Bye	Ayari (TUN); W 100–000	Ma Yn (CHN); L 000–010	Did not advance	Chițu (ROU); W 100–010	Nakamura (JPN); L 000–001	5
Rafaela Silva	−57 kg	Roper (GER); W 100–000	Kim J-d (KOR); W 010–000	Karakas (HUN); W 010–000	Căprioriu (ROU); W 010–000	Bye	Dorjsüren (MGL); W 010–000	1st place, gold medalist(s)
Mariana Silva	−63 kg	Szögedi (GHA); W 100–000	Trajdos (GER); W 000–000 S	Gerbi (ISR); W 001–000	Trstenjak (SLO); L 000–101	Bye	van Emden (NED); L 000–001	5
Maria Portela	−70 kg	Niang (MAR); W 001–000	Graf (AUT); L 000–000 S	Did not advance				
Mayra Aguiar	−78 kg	Bye	Giambelli (AUS); W 100–000	Malzahn (GER); W 000–000 S	Tcheuméo (FRA); L 000–000 S	Bye	Castillo (CUB); W 001–000	3rd place, bronze medalist(s)
Maria Suelen Altheman	+78 kg	Bye	Kim M-j (KOR); L 000–001	Did not advance				

== Modern pentathlon ==
Brazil, as the host nation, received a guaranteed place for each gender, unless a maximum of two men and two women has been selected to the team based on competition results.

Athlete	Event	Fencing (épée one touch)				Swimming (200 m freestyle)			Riding (show jumping)			Combined: shooting/running (10 m air pistol)/(3200 m)			Total points	Final rank
Athlete	Event	RR	BR	Rank	MP points	Time	Rank	MP points	Penalties	Rank	MP points	Time	Rank	MP Points	Total points	Final rank
Felipe Nascimento	Men's	9–26	1	35	155	2:05.39	20	324	49	31	251	12:15.59	33	565	1295	31
Yane Marques	Women's	16–19	0	23	196	2:14.30	9	298	14	16	286	13:31.64	30	489	1269	23

== Rowing ==
As the host nation, Brazil was guaranteed a quota place each in the men's and women's single sculls, but the team was expected to earn a substantial number of berths based on its performance at the various qualification events. Brazil secured places in single sculls and lightweight double sculls (men and women) at the Latin American Qualification Regatta in Chile, but they could only choose one boat by gender. Brazilian Rowing Confederation opted to send the men's and women's lightweight double sculls rowers instead to the Games.

Athlete	Event	Heats		Repechage		Semifinals		Final	
Athlete	Event	Time	Rank	Time	Rank	Time	Rank	Time	Rank
William Giaretton; Xavier Vela	Men's lightweight double sculls	6:31.13	5 R	7:11.20	5 SC/D	7:27.34	1 FC	6:44.80	14
Vanessa Cozzi; Fernanda Nunes	Women's lightweight double sculls	7:20.79	3 R	8:15.53	5 SC/D	8:14.06	2 FC	7:44.78	15

Qualification Legend: FA=Final A (medal); FB=Final B (non-medal); FC=Final C (non-medal); FD=Final D (non-medal); FE=Final E (non-medal); FF=Final F (non-medal); SA/B=Semifinals A/B; SC/D=Semifinals C/D; SE/F=Semifinals E/F; QF=Quarterfinals; R=Repechage

== Rugby sevens ==
=== Men's tournament ===
The Brazil men's rugby sevens team was automatically qualified for the Olympics as the host nation.

Team roster

The following is the Brazil roster in the men's rugby sevens tournament of the 2016 Summer Olympics.

Head coach: Andrés Romagnoli

No.	Pos.	Player	Date of birth (age)	Events	Points	Union
1	BK	Daniel Sancery	27 May 1994 (aged 22)	2	20	(Brazil) São José
2	FW	Martin Schaefer	18 October 1989 (aged 26)	5	5	(Brazil) SPAC
3	FW	Juliano Fiori	27 June 1985 (aged 31)	6	5	(England) Richmond
4	BK	Felipe Silva	28 February 1986 (aged 30)	4	7	(Brazil) SPAC
5	FW	Stefano Giantorno	27 September 1991 (aged 24)	1	5	(Argentina) San Luis
6	BK	Moisés Duque	21 December 1988 (aged 27)	6	55	(Brazil) São José
7	BK	Lucas Duque (c)	15 March 1984 (aged 32)	6	42	(Brazil) São José
8	FW	Felipe Sancery	27 May 1994 (aged 22)	3	0	(Brazil) São José
9	BK	Laurent Bourda-Couhet	12 July 1994 (aged 22)	3	0	(Brazil) Band Saracens
10	FW	Arthur Bergo	7 March 1994 (aged 22)	1	0	(Brazil) SPAC
11	BK	Gustavo Albuquerque	28 June 1991 (aged 25)	6	20	(Brazil) Curitiba
12	BK	André Silva	22 March 1988 (aged 28)	5	20	(Brazil) SPAC

Group play

Pos	Team	Pld	W	D	L	PF	PA	PD	Pts	Qualification
1	Fiji	3	3	0	0	85	45	+40	9	Quarter-finals
2	Argentina	3	2	0	1	62	35	+27	7	Quarter-finals
3	United States	3	1	0	2	59	41	+18	5	
4	Brazil	3	0	0	3	12	97	−85	3	

Source: World Rugby
Rules for classification: 1) Points; 2) Head-to-head result; 3) Point difference; 4) Points scored.

9 August 2016
13:30

Fiji	40–12	Brazil
Try: Veremalua (2) 6' c, 12' c Kolinisau 8' c Tuisova (2) 9' m, 13' c Viriviri 10' c Con: Kolinisau (2/2); Ravouvou (3/4)	Report (Rio 2016); Report (World Rugby)	Try: Claro 4' m Albuquerque 14' c Con: Duque (0/1); A. Silva (1/1)

Deodoro Stadium, Rio de Janeiro
Referee: Federico Anselmi (Argentina)

9 August 2016
18:00

United States	26–0	Brazil
Try: Niua 3' c Ebner 7' c Isles 13' m Unufe 14' c Con: Hughes (3/4)	Report

Deodoro Stadium, Rio de Janeiro
Referee: Matthew O'Brien (Australia)

10 August 2016
13:00

Argentina	31–0	Brazil
Try: Müller 4' m Revol 6' c Álvarez 7' c Schulz 11' c Bruzzone 13' m Con: Revol (3/5)	Report (Rio 2016); Report (World Rugby)

Deodoro Stadium, Rio de Janeiro
Referee: Mike Adamson (Great Britain)

Classification semifinal (9–12)

10 August 2016
16:00

United States	24–12	Brazil
Try: Isles (3) 4' m, 7' m, 10' c Barrett 6' c Con: Hughes (2/4)	Report (Rio 2016); Report (World Rugby)	Try: D. Sancery 3' m Bourda-Couhet 11' c Con: Duque (1/2)

Deodoro Stadium, Rio de Janeiro
Referee: Ben Crouse (South Africa)

Eleventh place match

11 August 2016
12:30

Brazil	0–24	Kenya
	Report (Rio 2016); Report (World Rugby)	Try: Odhiambo (3) 1' m, 6' c, 10 c Ambaka 8' m Con: Oliech (1/2); Injera (0/1); Adema (1/1)

Deodoro Stadium, Rio de Janeiro
Referee: Alexandre Ruiz (France)

=== Women's tournament ===
The Brazil women's rugby team was automatically qualified for the Olympics as the host nation.

Team roster

The following is the Brazil roster in the women's rugby sevens tournament of the 2016 Summer Olympics.

Head coach: Chris Neill

Trainer: Aristide Guerriero

Backs		Forwards
4	Edna Santini	1	Juliana Esteves dos Santos
5	Paula Ishibashi (c)	2	Luiza Campos
6	Tais Balconi	3	Júlia Sardá
7	Haline Scatrut	8	Beatriz Futuro Muhlbauer
10	Raquel Kochhann	9	Amanda Araújo
11	Isadora Cerullo	13	Mariana Barbosa Ramalho
12	Cláudia Teles

- Reserve Mariana Barbosa Ramalho was added to the main squad after day 1 after Sardá suffered an injury.

Group play

Pos	Team	Pld	W	D	L	PF	PA	PD	Pts	Qualification
1	Great Britain	3	3	0	0	91	3	+88	9	Quarter-finals
2	Canada	3	2	0	1	83	22	+61	7	Quarter-finals
3	Brazil (H)	3	1	0	2	29	77	−48	5	
4	Japan	3	0	0	3	10	111	−101	3	

Source: World Rugby
Rules for classification: 1) Points; 2) Head-to-head result; 3) Point difference; 4) Points scored.
(H) Hosts

6 August 2016
12:00

Great Britain	29–3	Brazil
Try: Watmore 5' c Hunt (2) 9' c, 12' m Joyce 14' m Scott 14' m Con: McLean (2/3); Watmore (0/2)	Report (Rio 2016); Report (World Rugby)	Pen: Kochhann (1/1) 7'

Deodoro Stadium, Rio de Janeiro
Referee: Alhambra Nievas (Spain)

6 August 2016
17:30

Canada	38–0	Brazil
Try: Paquin (2) 1' c, 7' c Kish 5' m Moleschi 6' c Farella (2) 12' c, 17' m Con: Russell (3/4); Landry (1/2)	Report (Rio 2016); Report (World Rugby)

Deodoro Stadium, Rio de Janeiro
Referee: Amy Perrett (Australia)

7 August 2016
12:00

Brazil	26–10	Japan
Try: Ishibashi 2' m Muhlbauer (2) 10' c, 14' c Araújo 12' c Con: Kochhann (2/3); Balconi (1/1)	Report (Rio 2016); Report (World Rugby)	Try: Kuwai 7' m Yamaguchi 8' m Con: Okuroda (0/2)

Deodoro Stadium, Rio de Janeiro
Referee: Gabriel Lee (Hong Kong)

Classification semifinal (9–12)

7 August 2016
16:00

Brazil	24–0	Colombia
Try: Ramalho 3' m Teles (2) 6' c, 7' m Muhlbauer 9' c Con: Kochhann (2/4)	Report (Rio 2016); Report (World Rugby)

Deodoro Stadium, Rio de Janeiro
Referee: Sakurako Kawasaki (Japan)

Ninth place match

8 August 2016
13:00

Brazil	33–5	Japan
Try: Muhlbauer 5' c Campos 7' m Ishibashi 8' c Scatrut 9' c Cerullo 13' c Con: Kochhann (4/5)	Report (Rio 2016); Report (World Rugby)	Try: Okuroda 3' m Con: Okuroda (0/1)

Deodoro Stadium, Rio de Janeiro
Referee: Alhambra Nievas (Spain)

== Sailing ==
As the host nation, Brazil has guaranteed one boat for each of the following classes at the Rio Olympic regatta, bringing the maximum quota of 15 sailors, in ten boats. On 21 December 2015, the Brazilian Olympic Committee had announced the full squad of sailors for the Rio regatta, including five-time Olympic medalist Robert Scheidt (Laser), skiff siblings Marco and Martine Grael, and 2008 Olympic bronze medalists Fernanda Oliveira (470) and Isabel Swan (Nacra 17).

Men

Athlete	Event	Race													Net points	Final rank
Athlete	Event	1	2	3	4	5	6	7	8	9	10	11	12	M*	Net points	Final rank
Ricardo Santos	RS:X	6	9	7	3	16	~~30~~	21	9	9	6	9	11	12	118	7
Robert Scheidt	Laser	23	1	~~27~~	4	11	2	4	5	26	11	—N/a		1	89	4
Jorge Zarif	Finn	4	8	11	~~22~~	2	19	2	13	15	9	—N/a		3	87	4
Bruno Bethlem; Henrique Haddad	470	19	23	25	17	22	~~27~~	9	11	14	27	—N/a		EL	167	23
Gabriel Borges; Marco Grael	49er	10	11	8	7	~~19~~	7	11	17	10	8	5	6	EL	109	11

Women

Athlete	Event	Race													Net points	Final rank
Athlete	Event	1	2	3	4	5	6	7	8	9	10	11	12	M*	Net points	Final rank
Patrícia Freitas	RS:X	6	8	4	2	13	~~16~~	10	1	3	8	8	9	8	80	8
Fernanda Decnop	Laser Radial	14	19	21	19	~~28~~	26	16	23	8	18	—N/a		EL	163	24
Ana Barbachan; Fernanda Oliveira	470	5	5	13	10	2	~~UFD~~	9	6	13	5	—N/a		8	76	8
Martine Grael; Kahena Kunze	49erFX	9	1	1	10	2	6	3	3	~~11~~	2	7	2	1	48	1st place, gold medalist(s)

Mixed

Athlete	Event	Race													Net points	Final rank
Athlete	Event	1	2	3	4	5	6	7	8	9	10	11	12	M*	Net points	Final rank
Samuel Albrecht; Isabel Swan	Nacra 17	17	1	18	9	2	16	12	4	~~19~~	7	8	8	8	117	10

M = Medal race; EL = Eliminated – did not advance into the medal race

== Shooting ==
As the host nation, Brazil has been awarded a minimum of nine quota places in each of the following events. In addition, a shooter that has qualified for one event may compete in others without affecting the quotas, as long as they obtained a minimum qualifying score (MQS) by 31 March 2016.

2010 Youth Olympic pistol champion Felipe Almeida Wu and rifle specialist Cassio Rippel became the only Brazilian shooters to attain a direct nomination to the Olympic team with their gold medal triumphs at the 2015 Pan American Games in Toronto, Canada. Following the end of the qualifying period, Brazilian Confederation had selected six other shooters (Schmits, Carraro, Teixeira, Portela, Duarte, and Ewald) to use the "host" vacancies for the Games. 2008 Olympian Júlio Almeida had occupied an exchanged spot in the women's air pistol with the men's 50 m pistol to round out the Brazilian roster at the completion of the ISSF World Cup meet in Rio de Janeiro.

Men

Athlete	Event	Qualification		Semifinal		Final	
Athlete	Event	Points	Rank	Points	Rank	Points	Rank
Júlio Almeida	10 m air pistol	577	13	—N/a		Did not advance	
Júlio Almeida	50 m pistol	542	30	—N/a		Did not advance	
Emerson Duarte	25 m rapid fire pistol	285	19	—N/a		Did not advance	
Renato Portella	Skeet	116	22	Did not advance			
Cassio Rippel	50 m rifle prone	621.3	26	—N/a		Did not advance	
Cassio Rippel	50 m rifle 3 positions	1129	44	—N/a		Did not advance	
Roberto Schmits	Trap	115	15	Did not advance			
Felipe Almeida Wu	10 m air pistol	580	7 Q	—N/a		202.1	2nd place, silver medalist(s)
Felipe Almeida Wu	50 m pistol	533	39	—N/a		Did not advance	

Women

Athlete	Event	Qualification		Semifinal		Final	
Athlete	Event	Points	Rank	Points	Rank	Points	Rank
Daniela Carraro	Skeet	53	21	Did not advance			
Rosane Ewald	10 m air rifle	396.9	50	—N/a		Did not advance	
Rosane Ewald	50 m rifle 3 positions	550	37	—N/a		Did not advance	
Janice Teixeira	Trap	60	21	Did not advance			

Qualification Legend: Q = Qualify for the next round; q = Qualify for the bronze medal (shotgun)

== Swimming ==
Brazilian swimmers have so far achieved qualifying standards in the following events (up to a maximum of two swimmers in each event at the Olympic Qualifying Time (OQT), and potentially 1 at the Olympic Selection Time (OST)): Swimmers must compete at the Brazilian Open Tournament and Maria Lenk Trophy (for pool events) to attain the FINA entry standards and confirm their places for the Games.

A total of 32 swimmers (21 men and 11 women), highlighted by London 2012 silver medalist and incoming four-time Olympian Thiago Pereira, had been selected to the Brazilian team for the home Olympics, the largest in history. Notable absence in the roster was 2008 Olympic champion and multiple-time World record holder César Cielo, who missed out on an individual spot in the 50 m freestyle.

Men

Athlete	Event	Heat		Semifinal		Final	
Athlete	Event	Time	Rank	Time	Rank	Time	Rank
Bruno Fratus	50 m freestyle	21.93	=10 Q	21.71	=6 Q	21.79	=6
Ítalo Duarte	50 m freestyle	21.96	13 Q	22.05	15	Did not advance	
Marcelo Chierighini	100 m freestyle	48.53	13 Q	48.23	8 Q	48.41	8
Nicolas Oliveira	100 m freestyle	49.05	28	Did not advance			
Nicolas Oliveira	200 m freestyle	DNS		Did not advance			
João de Lucca	200 m freestyle	1:47.63	25	Did not advance			
Luiz Altamir Melo	400 m freestyle	3:50.82	32	—N/a		Did not advance	
Miguel Valente	1500 m freestyle	15:22.57	31	—N/a		Did not advance	
Guilherme Guido	100 m backstroke	53.80	13 Q	54.16	14	Did not advance	
Felipe França Silva	100 m breaststroke	59.01 SA	3 Q	59.35	6 Q	59.38	7
João Gomes Júnior	100 m breaststroke	59.46	8 Q	59.40	7 Q	59.31	5
Tales Cerdeira	200 m breaststroke	2:12.83	29	Did not advance			
Thiago Simon	200 m breaststroke	2:15.01	36	Did not advance			
Marcos Macedo	100 m butterfly	53.87	34	Did not advance			
Henrique Martins	100 m butterfly	52.42	21	Did not advance			
Kaio de Almeida	200 m butterfly	1:56.45	12 Q	1:57.45	14	Did not advance	
Leonardo de Deus	200 m backstroke	1:57.00 NR	12 Q	1:57.67	13	Did not advance	
Leonardo de Deus	200 m butterfly	1:55.98	9 Q	1:56.77	13	Did not advance	
Thiago Pereira	200 m individual medley	1:58.63	5 Q	1:57.11	3 Q	1:58.02	7
Henrique Rodrigues	200 m individual medley	1:58.56	4 Q	1:59.23	9	Did not advance	
Brandonn Almeida	1500 m freestyle	15:14.73	29	—N/a		Did not advance	
Brandonn Almeida	400 m individual medley	4:17.25	15	—N/a		Did not advance	
Marcelo Chierighini; João de Lucca; Nicolas Oliveira; Matheus Santana; Gabriel Santos*	4 × 100 m freestyle relay	3:14.06	5 Q	—N/a		3:13.21	5
João de Lucca; Nicolas Oliveira; Luiz Altamir Melo; André Pereira	4 × 200 m freestyle relay	7:13.84	15	—N/a		Did not advance	
Guilherme Guido; Felipe França Silva; Henrique Martins; Marcelo Chierighini	4 × 100 m medley relay	3:32.96	7 Q	—N/a		3:32.84	6
Allan do Carmo	10 km open water	—N/a				1:53:16.4	18

Women

Athlete	Event	Heat		Semifinal		Final	
Athlete	Event	Time	Rank	Time	Rank	Time	Rank
Graciele Herrmann	50 m freestyle	25.60	40	Did not advance			
Etiene Medeiros	50 m freestyle	24.82	16 Q	24.45 SA	7 Q	24.69	8
Etiene Medeiros	100 m freestyle	54.38	14 Q	54.59	16	Did not advance	
Etiene Medeiros	100 m backstroke	1:01.70	25	Did not advance			
Larissa Oliveira	100 m freestyle	54.72	21	Did not advance			
Larissa Oliveira	200 m freestyle	2:00.76	35	Did not advance			
Manuella Lyrio	200 m freestyle	1:57.28 SA	14 Q	1:57.43	12	Did not advance	
Daynara de Paula	100 m butterfly	57.92	14 Q	58.65	16	Did not advance	
Daiene Dias	100 m butterfly	58.15	15 Q	58.52	14	Did not advance	
Joanna Maranhão	200 m butterfly	2:10.69	24	Did not advance			
Joanna Maranhão	200 m individual medley	2:13.06	18	Did not advance			
Joanna Maranhão	400 m individual medley	4:38.88	15	—N/a		Did not advance	
Daynara de Paula; Manuella Lyrio; Etiene Medeiros; Larissa Oliveira	4 × 100 m freestyle relay	3:39.40	11	—N/a		Did not advance	
Jéssica Cavalheiro; Manuella Lyrio; Larissa Oliveira; Gabrielle Roncatto	4 × 200 m freestyle relay	7:55.68 SA	11	—N/a		Did not advance	
Daynara de Paula; Jhennifer da Conceição; Etiene Medeiros; Larissa Oliveira; Daiene Dias*; Natalia de Luccas*	4 × 100 m medley relay	4:02.83	13	—N/a		Did not advance	
Poliana Okimoto	10 km open water	—N/a				1:56:51.4	3rd place, bronze medalist(s)
Ana Marcela Cunha	10 km open water	—N/a				1:57:29.0	10

* Reserve

== Synchronized swimming ==
As the host nation, Brazil will have a squad of nine synchronized swimmers taking part in both the women's duet and team events.

Athlete	Event	Technical routine		Free routine (preliminary)			Free routine (final)		
Athlete	Event	Points	Rank	Points	Total (technical + free)	Rank	Points	Total (technical + free)	Rank
Luisa Borges; Maria Eduarda Miccuci	Duet	83.3008	14	84.0333	167.3341	13	Did not advance		
Luisa Borges; Maria Bruno; Maria Clara Coutinho; Beatriz Feres; Branca Feres; Maria Eduarda Miccuci; Lorena Molinos; Pamela Nogueira; Lara Teixeira	Team	84.7985	6	—N/a			87.2000	171.9985	6

== Table tennis ==
Brazil fielded a team of six table tennis players (three men and three women) at the 2016 Olympics, as the host nation is automatically entitled to use these places. Hugo Calderano was first selected to the table tennis team by claiming the Olympic spot in the men's singles at the 2015 Pan American Games, while his teammate Gustavo Tsuboi, along with Lin Gui and Caroline Kumahara, both competing in the women's singles, did so at the Latin American Qualification Tournament, allowing their "host" places to be redistributed to the next highest table tennis player in the ITTF Olympic Rankings.

Cazuo Matsumoto and Bruna Takahashi were each awarded the third spot to build the men's and women's teams for the Games as the top Latin American nation in the ITTF Olympic Rankings.

Men

Athlete	Event	Preliminary	Round 1	Round 2	Round 3	Round of 16	Quarterfinals	Semifinals	Final / BM	
Athlete	Event	Opposition Result	Opposition Result	Opposition Result	Opposition Result	Opposition Result	Opposition Result	Opposition Result	Opposition Result	Rank
Hugo Calderano	Singles	Bye	Pereira (CUB); W 4–0	Gerell (SWE); W 4–1	Tang P (HKG); W 4–2	Mizutani (JPN); L 2–4	Did not advance			
Gustavo Tsuboi	Singles	Bye	Wang Jn (CGO); L 0–4	Did not advance						
Hugo Calderano; Cazuo Matsumoto; Gustavo Tsuboi	Team	—N/a				South Korea; L 0–3	Did not advance			

Women

Athlete	Event	Preliminary	Round 1	Round 2	Round 3	Round of 16	Quarterfinals	Semifinals	Final / BM	
Athlete	Event	Opposition Result	Opposition Result	Opposition Result	Opposition Result	Opposition Result	Opposition Result	Opposition Result	Opposition Result	Rank
Caroline Kumahara	Singles	Tapper (AUS); W 4–2	Ni Xl (LUX); L 3–4	Did not advance						
Lin Gui	Singles	Bye	Dvorak (ESP); W 4–2	Samara (ROU); L 0–4	Did not advance					
Caroline Kumahara; Lin Gui; Bruna Takahashi	Team	—N/a				China; L 0–3	Did not advance			

== Taekwondo ==
As the host nation, Brazilian taekwondo players have already received four quota places, two men and two women, at their disposal for the Games. On 18 March 2016, Brazilian Taekwondo nominated the four athletes to take up their host nation places for the Olympics.

Athlete	Event	Round of 16	Quarterfinals	Semifinals	Repechage	Final / BM	
Athlete	Event	Opposition Result	Opposition Result	Opposition Result	Opposition Result	Opposition Result	Rank
Venilton Teixeira	Men's −58 kg	Atias (ISR); W 16–2 PTG	Navarro (MEX); L 5–8	Did not advance			
Maicon Siqueira	Men's +80 kg	Lambdin (USA); W 9–7	Issoufou (NIG); L 1–6	Did not advance	N'diaye (FRA); W 5–2	Cho (GBR); W 5–4	3rd place, bronze medalist(s)
Iris Sing	Women's −49 kg	Kilday (NZL); W 7–5	Manjarrez (MEX); L 4–14	Did not advance			
Júlia Vasconcelos	Women's −57 kg	Mikkonen (FIN); L 9–10	Did not advance				

== Tennis ==
Brazil has entered seven tennis players (five men and two women) into the Olympic tournament. Two-time Olympian Thomaz Bellucci (world no. 62) qualified directly for the men's singles as one of the top 56 eligible players in the ATP World Rankings as of 6 June 2016. Rogério Dutra Silva and Teliana Pereira had claimed one of six Olympic places each in their respective singles events, as Brazil's top-ranked tennis players outside of direct qualifying position. Meanwhile, Marcelo Melo teamed up with his London 2012 partner Bruno Soares in the men's doubles by virtue of the former's top 10 ATP ranking.

Men

Athlete	Event	Round of 64	Round of 32	Round of 16	Quarterfinals	Semifinals	Final / BM	
Athlete	Event	Opposition Score	Opposition Score	Opposition Score	Opposition Score	Opposition Score	Opposition Score	Rank
Thomaz Bellucci	Singles	Brown (GER); W 4–6, 5–4^{ret}	Cuevas (URU); W 6–2, 4–6, 6–3	Goffin (BEL); W 7–6^{(12–10)}, 6–4	Nadal (ESP); L 6–2, 4–6, 2–6	Did not advance		
Rogério Dutra Silva	Singles	Fabbiano (ITA); W 7–6^{(7–4)}, 6–1	Monfils (FRA); L 2–6, 4–6	Did not advance				
Thomaz Bellucci; André Sá	Doubles	—N/a	A Murray / J Murray (GBR); W 7–6^{(8–6)}, 7–6^{(16–14)}	Fognini / Seppi (ITA); L 7–5, 5–7, 3–6	Did not advance			
Marcelo Melo; Bruno Soares	Doubles	—N/a	Sa Ratiwatana / So Ratiwatana (THA); W 6–0, 7–6^{(7–1)}	Djokovic / Zimonjić (SRB); W 6–4, 6–4	Mergea / Tecău (ROU); L 4–6, 7–5, 2–6	Did not advance		

Women

Athlete	Event	Round of 64	Round of 32	Round of 16	Quarterfinals	Semifinals	Final / BM	
Athlete	Event	Opposition Score	Opposition Score	Opposition Score	Opposition Score	Opposition Score	Opposition Score	Rank
Teliana Pereira	Singles	Garcia (FRA); L 1–6, 2–6	Did not advance					
Paula Cristina Gonçalves; Teliana Pereira	Doubles	—N/a	Muguruza / Suárez Navarro (ESP); L 6–7^{(6–8)}, 2–6	Did not advance				

Mixed

Athlete	Event	Round of 16	Quarterfinals	Semifinals	Final / BM	
Athlete	Event	Opposition Score	Opposition Score	Opposition Score	Opposition Score	Rank
Teliana Pereira; Marcelo Melo	Doubles	Garcia / Mahut (FRA); W 7–6^{(7–4)}, 7–6^{(7–1)}	Mattek-Sands / Sock (USA); L 4–6, 4–6	Did not advance		

== Triathlon ==
Brazil, as the host nation, receives a guaranteed place for each gender, unless a maximum of two men and two women has been selected to the team based on competition results.

Athlete	Event	Swim (1.5 km)	Trans 1	Bike (40 km)	Trans 2	Run (10 km)	Total Time	Rank
Diogo Sclebin	Men's	18:20	0:49	59:29	0:40	33:14	1:52:32	41
Pâmella Oliveira	Women's	19:04	0:56	1:04:43	0:40	38:40	2:04:03	40

== Volleyball ==
=== Beach ===
As the host nation, Brazil received a guaranteed place for each gender. Because the host nation has dominated the podium to seal another place each in both the men's and women's tournaments at the 2015 FIVB World Championships, Brazil ensures a maximum of two teams to take part in each competition. On 16 September 2015, the Brazilian Olympic Committee announced the names of the teams in both men's and women's beach volleyball.

Athlete	Event	Preliminary round	Standing	Round of 16	Quarterfinals	Semifinals	Final / BM	
Athlete	Event	Opposition Score	Standing	Opposition Score	Opposition Score	Opposition Score	Opposition Score	Rank
Alison Cerutti; Bruno Schmidt	Men's	Pool A Binstock – Schachter (CAN); W 2 – 0 (21–19, 22–20); Doppler – Horst (AUT); L 1 – 2 (21–23, 21–16, 13–15); Carambula – Ranghieri (ITA); W 2 – 0 (21–19, 21–16)	2 Q	Gavira – Herrera (ESP); W 2 – 0 (24–22, 21–13)	Dalhausser – Lucena (USA); W 2 – 1 (21–14, 12–21, 15–9)	Brouwer – Meeuwsen (NED); W 2 – 1 (21–17, 21–23, 16–14)	Lupo – Nicolai (ITA); W 2 – 0 (21–19, 21–17)	1st place, gold medalist(s)
Evandro Oliveira; Pedro Solberg	Men's	Pool D Díaz – González (CUB); L 1 – 2 (22–24, 23–21, 13–15); Saxton – Schalk (CAN); L 1 – 2 (21–17, 18–21, 14–16); Samoilovs – Šmēdiņš (LAT); W 2 – 1 (21–16, 20–22, 15–7)	2 Q	Barsouk – Liamin (RUS); L 1 – 2 (21–16, 14–21, 10–15)	Did not advance			
Talita Antunes; Larissa França	Women's	Pool A Birlova – Ukolova (RUS); W 2 – 0 (21–14, 21–16); Fendrick – Sweat (USA); W 2 – 0 (21–16, 21–13); Brzostek – Kołosińska (POL); W 2 – 0 (21–10, 21–15)	1 Q	Borger – Büthe (GER); W 2 – 0 (21–17, 21–19)	Heidrich – Zumkehr (SUI); W 2 – 1 (21–23, 27–25, 15–13)	Ludwig – Walkenhorst (GER); L 0 – 2 (18–21, 12–21)	Ross – Walsh Jennings (USA); L 1 – 2 (21–17, 17–21, 9–15)	4
Ágatha Bednarczuk; Bárbara Seixas	Women's	Pool B Hermannová – Sluková (CZE); W 2 – 1 (19–21, 21–17, 15–11); Gallay – Klug (ARG); W 2 – 0 (21–11, 21–17); Baquerizo – Fernández (ESP); L 0 – 2 (17–21, 20–22)	2 Q	Wang – Yue (CHN); W 2 – 0 (21–12, 21–16)	Birlova – Ukolova (RUS); W 2 – 0 (23–21, 21–16)	Ross – Walsh Jennings (USA); W 2 – 0 (22–20, 21–18)	Ludwig – Walkenhorst (GER); L 0 – 2 (18–21, 14–21)	2nd place, silver medalist(s)

=== Indoor ===
Summary

Team	Event	Group Stage						Quarterfinal	Semifinal	Final / BM	
Team	Event	Opposition Score	Opposition Score	Opposition Score	Opposition Score	Opposition Score	Rank	Opposition Score	Opposition Score	Opposition Score	Rank
Brazil men's	Men's tournament	Mexico; W 3–1	Canada; W 3–1	United States; L 1–3	Italy; L 1–3	France; W 3–1	4 Q	Argentina; W 3–1	Russia; W 3–0	Italy; W 3–0	1st place, gold medalist(s)
Brazil women's	Women's tournament	Cameroon; W 3–0	Argentina; W 3–0	Japan; W 3–0	South Korea; W 3–0	Russia; W 3–0	1 Q	China; L 2–3	Did not advance		5

==== Men's tournament ====
The Brazil men's volleyball team was automatically qualified for the Olympics as the host nation.

Team roster

The following is the Brazil roster in the men's volleyball tournament of the 2016 Summer Olympics.

Head coach: Bernardo Rezende

No.	Name	Date of birth	Height	Weight	Spike	Block	2015–16 club
1	Bruno Rezende (c)	2 July 1986	1.90 m (6 ft 3 in)	76 kg (168 lb)	323 cm (127 in)	302 cm (119 in)	(Italy) DHL Modena
3	Éder Carbonera	19 October 1983	2.05 m (6 ft 9 in)	107 kg (236 lb)	360 cm (140 in)	330 cm (130 in)	(Brazil) Funvic Taubaté
4	Wallace de Souza	26 June 1987	1.98 m (6 ft 6 in)	87 kg (192 lb)	344 cm (135 in)	318 cm (125 in)	(Brazil) Sada Cruzeiro
7	William Arjona	31 July 1979	1.85 m (6 ft 1 in)	78 kg (172 lb)	300 cm (120 in)	295 cm (116 in)	(Brazil) Sada Cruzeiro
10	Sérgio Santos (L)	15 October 1975	1.84 m (6 ft 0 in)	78 kg (172 lb)	325 cm (128 in)	310 cm (120 in)	(Brazil) SESI São Paulo
12	Luiz Felipe Fonteles	19 June 1984	1.96 m (6 ft 5 in)	89 kg (196 lb)	330 cm (130 in)	320 cm (130 in)	(Brazil) Funvic Taubaté
13	Maurício Souza	29 September 1988	2.09 m (6 ft 10 in)	93 kg (205 lb)	344 cm (135 in)	323 cm (127 in)	(Brazil) Funvic Taubaté
14	Douglas Souza	20 August 1995	1.99 m (6 ft 6 in)	75 kg (165 lb)	338 cm (133 in)	317 cm (125 in)	(Brazil) SESI São Paulo
16	Lucas Saatkamp	6 March 1986	2.09 m (6 ft 10 in)	101 kg (223 lb)	340 cm (130 in)	321 cm (126 in)	(Italy) DHL Modena
17	Evandro Guerra	27 December 1981	2.07 m (6 ft 9 in)	103 kg (227 lb)	359 cm (141 in)	332 cm (131 in)	(Japan) Suntory Sunbirds
18	Ricardo Lucarelli	14 February 1992	1.95 m (6 ft 5 in)	79 kg (174 lb)	338 cm (133 in)	308 cm (121 in)	(Brazil) Funvic Taubaté
19	Maurício Borges Silva	4 February 1989	1.99 m (6 ft 6 in)	99 kg (218 lb)	335 cm (132 in)	315 cm (124 in)	(Turkey) Arkas İzmir

Group play

Pos	Team	Pld	W	L	Pts	SW	SL	SR	SPW	SPL	SPR	Qualification
1	Italy	5	4	1	12	13	5	2.600	432	375	1.152	Quarterfinals
2	Canada	5	3	2	9	10	7	1.429	378	378	1.000	Quarterfinals
3	United States	5	3	2	9	10	8	1.250	419	405	1.035	Quarterfinals
4	Brazil (H)	5	3	2	9	11	9	1.222	467	442	1.057	Quarterfinals
5	France	5	2	3	6	8	9	0.889	386	367	1.052	
6	Mexico	5	0	5	0	1	15	0.067	283	398	0.711	

Source: FIVB
Rules for classification: Tiebreakers
(H) Host

7 August 2016; 11:35	Brazil	3–1	Mexico	Ginásio do Maracanãzinho, Rio de Janeiro; Attendance: 8,686; Referees: Nasr Shaaban (EGY), Arturo Di Giacomo (BEL)
7 August 2016; 11:35	(23–25, 25–19, 25–14, 25–18); Results Statistics			Ginásio do Maracanãzinho, Rio de Janeiro; Attendance: 8,686; Referees: Nasr Shaaban (EGY), Arturo Di Giacomo (BEL)

9 August 2016; 22:35	Brazil	3–1	Canada	Ginásio do Maracanãzinho, Rio de Janeiro; Attendance: 8,749; Referees: Luis Macias (MEX), Piotr Dudek (POL)
9 August 2016; 22:35	(24–26, 25–18, 25–22, 25–17); Results Statistics			Ginásio do Maracanãzinho, Rio de Janeiro; Attendance: 8,749; Referees: Luis Macias (MEX), Piotr Dudek (POL)

11 August 2016; 22:35	Brazil	1–3	United States	Ginásio do Maracanãzinho, Rio de Janeiro; Attendance: 8,779; Referees: Liu Jiang (CHN), Vladimir Simonović (SRB)
11 August 2016; 22:35	(20–25, 23–25, 25–20, 20–25); Results Statistics			Ginásio do Maracanãzinho, Rio de Janeiro; Attendance: 8,779; Referees: Liu Jiang (CHN), Vladimir Simonović (SRB)

13 August 2016; 22:35	Brazil	1–3	Italy	Ginásio do Maracanãzinho, Rio de Janeiro; Attendance: 8,892; Referees: Piotr Dudek (POL), Nasr Shaaban (EGY)
13 August 2016; 22:35	(25–23, 23–25, 22–25, 15–25); Results Statistics			Ginásio do Maracanãzinho, Rio de Janeiro; Attendance: 8,892; Referees: Piotr Dudek (POL), Nasr Shaaban (EGY)

15 August 2016; 22:45	Brazil	3–1	France	Ginásio do Maracanãzinho, Rio de Janeiro; Attendance: 9,800; Referees: Juraj Mokrý (SVK), Nasr Shaaban (EGY)
15 August 2016; 22:45	(25–22, 22–25, 25–20, 25–23); Results Statistics			Ginásio do Maracanãzinho, Rio de Janeiro; Attendance: 9,800; Referees: Juraj Mokrý (SVK), Nasr Shaaban (EGY)

Quarterfinal

17 August 2016; 22:15	Brazil	3–1	Argentina	Ginásio do Maracanãzinho, Rio de Janeiro; Attendance: 9,498; Referees: Vladimir Simonović (SRB), Piotr Dudek (POL)
17 August 2016; 22:15	(25–22, 17–25, 25–19, 25–23); Results Statistics			Ginásio do Maracanãzinho, Rio de Janeiro; Attendance: 9,498; Referees: Vladimir Simonović (SRB), Piotr Dudek (POL)

Semifinal

19 August 2016; 22:15	Russia	0–3	Brazil	Ginásio do Maracanãzinho, Rio de Janeiro; Attendance: 9,784; Referees: Juraj Mokrý (SVK), Vladimir Simonović (SRB)
19 August 2016; 22:15	(21–25, 20–25, 17–25); Results Statistics			Ginásio do Maracanãzinho, Rio de Janeiro; Attendance: 9,784; Referees: Juraj Mokrý (SVK), Vladimir Simonović (SRB)

Gold medal match

21 August 2016; 13:15	Italy	0–3	Brazil	Ginásio do Maracanãzinho, Rio de Janeiro; Attendance: 9,824; Referees: Andrey Zenovich (RUS), Denny Cespedes (DOM)
21 August 2016; 13:15	(22–25, 26–28, 24–26); Results Statistics			Ginásio do Maracanãzinho, Rio de Janeiro; Attendance: 9,824; Referees: Andrey Zenovich (RUS), Denny Cespedes (DOM)

==== Women's tournament ====
The Brazil women's volleyball team was automatically qualified for the Olympics as the host nation.

Team roster

The following is the Brazilian roster in the women's volleyball tournament of the 2016 Summer Olympics.

Head coach: José Roberto Guimarães

No.	Name	Date of birth	Height	Weight	Spike	Block	2015–16 club
1	Fabiana Claudino (c)	24 January 1985	1.94 m (6 ft 4 in)	76 kg (168 lb)	314 cm (124 in)	293 cm (115 in)	(Brazil) SESI São Paulo
2	Juciely Cristina Barreto	18 December 1980	1.84 m (6 ft 0 in)	71 kg (157 lb)	312 cm (123 in)	289 cm (114 in)	(Brazil) Rio de Janeiro VC
3	Dani Lins	5 January 1985	1.84 m (6 ft 0 in)	68 kg (150 lb)	290 cm (110 in)	276 cm (109 in)	(Brazil) Osasco VC
5	Adenízia da Silva	18 December 1986	1.86 m (6 ft 1 in)	63 kg (139 lb)	312 cm (123 in)	290 cm (110 in)	(Brazil) Osasco VC
6	Thaísa Menezes	15 May 1987	1.96 m (6 ft 5 in)	79 kg (174 lb)	316 cm (124 in)	301 cm (119 in)	(Brazil) Osasco VC
8	Jaqueline Carvalho	31 December 1986	1.87 m (6 ft 2 in)	70 kg (150 lb)	302 cm (119 in)	286 cm (113 in)	(Brazil) Minas Tênis Clube
10	Gabriela Guimarães	19 May 1994	1.80 m (5 ft 11 in)	59 kg (130 lb)	295 cm (116 in)	274 cm (108 in)	(Brazil) Rio de Janeiro VC
12	Natália Pereira	4 April 1989	1.86 m (6 ft 1 in)	76 kg (168 lb)	300 cm (120 in)	288 cm (113 in)	(Brazil) Rio de Janeiro VC
13	Sheilla Castro	1 July 1983	1.86 m (6 ft 1 in)	64 kg (141 lb)	302 cm (119 in)	284 cm (112 in)	(Turkey) VakifBank Istanbul
16	Fernanda Garay	10 May 1986	1.81 m (5 ft 11 in)	74 kg (163 lb)	308 cm (121 in)	288 cm (113 in)	(Russia) Dinamo Moscow
17	Fabíola de Souza	3 February 1983	1.84 m (6 ft 0 in)	70 kg (150 lb)	300 cm (120 in)	285 cm (112 in)	(Switzerland) Voléro Zürich
19	Léia Silva (L)	3 January 1985	1.70 m (5 ft 7 in)	60 kg (130 lb)	268 cm (106 in)	254 cm (100 in)	(Brazil) Minas TC

Group play

Pos	Team	Pld	W	L	Pts	SW	SL	SR	SPW	SPL	SPR	Qualification
1	Brazil (H)	5	5	0	15	15	0	MAX	377	272	1.386	Quarter-finals
2	Russia	5	4	1	12	12	4	3.000	393	323	1.217	Quarter-finals
3	South Korea	5	3	2	9	10	7	1.429	384	372	1.032	Quarter-finals
4	Japan	5	2	3	6	7	9	0.778	347	364	0.953	Quarter-finals
5	Argentina	5	1	4	2	3	14	0.214	319	407	0.784	
6	Cameroon	5	0	5	1	2	15	0.133	328	410	0.800	

Source: FIVB
Rules for classification: Tiebreakers
(H) Host

6 August 2016; 15:00	Brazil	3–0	Cameroon	Ginásio do Maracanãzinho, Rio de Janeiro; Attendance: 7,890; Referees: Heike Kraft (GER), Liu Jiang (CHN)
6 August 2016; 15:00	(25–14, 25–21, 25–13); Result Statistics			Ginásio do Maracanãzinho, Rio de Janeiro; Attendance: 7,890; Referees: Heike Kraft (GER), Liu Jiang (CHN)

8 August 2016; 22:35	Brazil	3–0	Argentina	Ginásio do Maracanãzinho, Rio de Janeiro; Attendance: 7,651; Referees: Nasr Shaaban (EGY), Fabrizio Pasquali (ITA)
8 August 2016; 22:35	(25–16, 25–19, 25–11); Result Statistics			Ginásio do Maracanãzinho, Rio de Janeiro; Attendance: 7,651; Referees: Nasr Shaaban (EGY), Fabrizio Pasquali (ITA)

10 August 2016; 22:35	Brazil	3–0	Japan	Ginásio do Maracanãzinho, Rio de Janeiro; Attendance: 8,759; Referees: Susana Rodríguez (ESP), Luís Macias (MEX)
10 August 2016; 22:35	(25–18, 25–18, 25–22); Result Statistics			Ginásio do Maracanãzinho, Rio de Janeiro; Attendance: 8,759; Referees: Susana Rodríguez (ESP), Luís Macias (MEX)

12 August 2016; 22:35	Brazil	3–0	South Korea	Ginásio do Maracanãzinho, Rio de Janeiro; Attendance: 8,790; Referees: Patricia Rolf (USA), Liu Jiang (CHN)
12 August 2016; 22:35	(25–17, 25–13, 27–25); Result Statistics			Ginásio do Maracanãzinho, Rio de Janeiro; Attendance: 8,790; Referees: Patricia Rolf (USA), Liu Jiang (CHN)

14 August 2016; 22:35	Brazil	3–0	Russia	Ginásio do Maracanãzinho, Rio de Janeiro; Attendance: 8,892; Referees: Nasr Shaaban (EGY), Taoufik Boudaya (TUN)
14 August 2016; 22:35	(25–23, 25–21, 25–21); Result Statistics			Ginásio do Maracanãzinho, Rio de Janeiro; Attendance: 8,892; Referees: Nasr Shaaban (EGY), Taoufik Boudaya (TUN)

Quarterfinal

16 August 2016; 22:15	Brazil	2–3	China	Ginásio do Maracanãzinho, Rio de Janeiro; Attendance: 9,498; Referees: Piotr Dudek (POL), Vladimir Simonović (SRB)
16 August 2016; 22:15	(25–15, 23–25, 22–25, 25–22, 13–15); Result Statistics			Ginásio do Maracanãzinho, Rio de Janeiro; Attendance: 9,498; Referees: Piotr Dudek (POL), Vladimir Simonović (SRB)

== Water polo ==
Summary

Key:

- FT – After full time.
- P – Match decided by penalty-shootout.

Team	Event	Group Stage						Quarterfinal	Semifinal	Final / BM	
Team	Event	Opposition Score	Opposition Score	Opposition Score	Opposition Score	Opposition Score	Rank	Opposition Score	Opposition Score	Opposition Score	Rank
Brazil men's	Men's tournament	Australia; W 8–7	Japan; W 16–8	Serbia; W 6–5	Greece; L 4–9	Hungary; L 6–10	3	Croatia; L 6–10	Hungary; L 4–13	Spain; L 8–9	8
Brazil women's	Women's tournament	Italy; L 3–9	Russia; L 7–14	Australia; L 3–10	—N/a		4	United States; L 3–13	Australia; L 4–11	China; L 5–10	8

=== Men's tournament ===
The Brazil men's water polo team was automatically qualified for the Olympics as the host nation.

Team roster

The following is the Brazilian roster in the men's water polo tournament of the 2016 Summer Olympics.

Head coach: (Croatia) Ratko Rudić

№	Name	Pos.	Height	Weight	Date of birth	2016 club
1	Slobodan Soro	GK	1.96 m (6 ft 5 in)	100 kg (220 lb)	23 December 1978	(Brazil) Botafogo
2	Jonas Crivella	D	1.86 m (6 ft 1 in)	79 kg (174 lb)	30 April 1988	(Brazil) Botafogo
3	Rudá Franco	D	1.85 m (6 ft 1 in)	90 kg (198 lb)	25 July 1986	(Brazil) SESI São Paulo
4	Ives González	CF	1.91 m (6 ft 3 in)	102 kg (225 lb)	12 October 1980	(Brazil) Pinheiros
5	Paulo Salemi	CB	1.91 m (6 ft 3 in)	94 kg (207 lb)	8 August 1993	(Brazil) Botafogo
6	Bernardo Gomes	D	1.91 m (6 ft 3 in)	98 kg (216 lb)	12 November 1993	(Brazil) Botafogo
7	Adrià Delgado	D	1.88 m (6 ft 2 in)	88 kg (194 lb)	7 April 1990	(Brazil) Pinheiros
8	Felipe Silva	CB	1.92 m (6 ft 4 in)	94 kg (207 lb)	8 August 1984	(Brazil) Pinheiros
9	Bernardo Rocha	CB	1.84 m (6 ft 0 in)	96 kg (212 lb)	3 July 1989	(Brazil) SESI São Paulo
10	Felipe Perrone (c)	D	1.83 m (6 ft 0 in)	94 kg (207 lb)	27 February 1986	(Brazil) Botafogo
11	Gustavo Guimarães	D	1.86 m (6 ft 1 in)	89 kg (196 lb)	24 January 1994	(Brazil) Pinheiros
12	Josip Vrlić	CF	1.96 m (6 ft 5 in)	120 kg (265 lb)	25 April 1986	(Brazil) Botafogo
13	Vinicius Antonelli	GK	1.82 m (6 ft 0 in)	88 kg (194 lb)	1 May 1990	(Brazil) Pinheiros

Group play

Pos	Team	Pld	W	D	L	GF	GA	GD	Pts	Qualification
1	Hungary	5	2	3	0	57	43	+14	7	Quarter-finals
2	Greece	5	2	2	1	41	40	+1	6	Quarter-finals
3	Brazil (H)	5	3	0	2	40	39	+1	6	Quarter-finals
4	Serbia	5	2	2	1	49	44	+5	6	Quarter-finals
5	Australia	5	2	1	2	44	40	+4	5	
6	Japan	5	0	0	5	36	61	−25	0	

Source: Rio2016
Rules for classification: 1) Points; 2) Head-to-head points; 3) Head-to-head goal difference; 4) Head-to-head goals scored; 5) Goal difference.
(H) Hosts

6 August 2016; 20:50	Report	Brazil	8–7	Australia	Maria Lenk Aquatic Center, Rio de Janeiro; Referees: Filippo Gomez (ITA), Francesc Buch (ESP)
6 August 2016; 20:50	Report	Score by quarters: 3–2, 2–1, 2–2, 1–2			Maria Lenk Aquatic Center, Rio de Janeiro; Referees: Filippo Gomez (ITA), Francesc Buch (ESP)
6 August 2016; 20:50	Report	Delgado 3	Goals	Campbell, Cotterill 2	Maria Lenk Aquatic Center, Rio de Janeiro; Referees: Filippo Gomez (ITA), Francesc Buch (ESP)

8 August 2016; 19:30	Report	Japan	8–16	Brazil	Maria Lenk Aquatic Center, Rio de Janeiro; Referees: Nenad Peris (CRO), Francesc Buch (ESP)
8 August 2016; 19:30	Report	Score by quarters: 2–5, 1–3, 4–4, 1–4			Maria Lenk Aquatic Center, Rio de Janeiro; Referees: Nenad Peris (CRO), Francesc Buch (ESP)
8 August 2016; 19:30	Report	three players 2	Goals	Vrlić 5	Maria Lenk Aquatic Center, Rio de Janeiro; Referees: Nenad Peris (CRO), Francesc Buch (ESP)

10 August 2016; 19:30	Report	Brazil	6–5	Serbia	Maria Lenk Aquatic Center, Rio de Janeiro; Referees: Benjamin Mercier (FRA), Ni Shi Wei (CHN)
10 August 2016; 19:30	Report	Score by quarters: 0–2, 3–1, 2–0, 1–2			Maria Lenk Aquatic Center, Rio de Janeiro; Referees: Benjamin Mercier (FRA), Ni Shi Wei (CHN)
10 August 2016; 19:30	Report	Vrlić 2	Goals	five players 1	Maria Lenk Aquatic Center, Rio de Janeiro; Referees: Benjamin Mercier (FRA), Ni Shi Wei (CHN)

12 August 2016; 19:30	Report	Greece	9–4	Brazil	Maria Lenk Aquatic Center, Rio de Janeiro; Referees: Boris Margeta (SLO), Sergey Naumov (RUS)
12 August 2016; 19:30	Report	Score by quarters: 3–1, 1–1, 3–2, 2–0			Maria Lenk Aquatic Center, Rio de Janeiro; Referees: Boris Margeta (SLO), Sergey Naumov (RUS)
12 August 2016; 19:30	Report	three players 2	Goals	Silva 2	Maria Lenk Aquatic Center, Rio de Janeiro; Referees: Boris Margeta (SLO), Sergey Naumov (RUS)

14 August 2016; 20:50	Report	Brazil	6–10	Hungary	Olympic Aquatics Stadium, Rio de Janeiro; Referees: Francesc Buch (ESP), Stanko Ivanovski (MNE)
14 August 2016; 20:50	Report	Score by quarters: 0–3, 1–2, 3–3, 2–2			Olympic Aquatics Stadium, Rio de Janeiro; Referees: Francesc Buch (ESP), Stanko Ivanovski (MNE)
14 August 2016; 20:50	Report	Gomes, Perrone 2	Goals	three players 2	Olympic Aquatics Stadium, Rio de Janeiro; Referees: Francesc Buch (ESP), Stanko Ivanovski (MNE)

Quarterfinal

16 August 2016; 15:10	Report	Brazil	6–10	Croatia	Olympic Aquatics Stadium, Rio de Janeiro; Referees: Adrian Alexandrescu (ROU), Benjamin Mercier (FRA)
16 August 2016; 15:10	Report	Score by quarters: 2–3, 1–4, 3–1, 0–2			Olympic Aquatics Stadium, Rio de Janeiro; Referees: Adrian Alexandrescu (ROU), Benjamin Mercier (FRA)
16 August 2016; 15:10	Report	Gomes 3	Goals	García, Joković 3	Olympic Aquatics Stadium, Rio de Janeiro; Referees: Adrian Alexandrescu (ROU), Benjamin Mercier (FRA)

Classification semifinal (5–8)

18 August 2016; 11:00	Report	Hungary	13–4	Brazil	Olympic Aquatics Stadium, Rio de Janeiro; Referees: Filippo Gomez (ITA), Masoud Rezvani (IRI)
18 August 2016; 11:00	Report	Score by quarters: 4–1, 3–0, 4–3, 2–0			Olympic Aquatics Stadium, Rio de Janeiro; Referees: Filippo Gomez (ITA), Masoud Rezvani (IRI)
18 August 2016; 11:00	Report	Erdélyi 4	Goals	Delgado 2	Olympic Aquatics Stadium, Rio de Janeiro; Referees: Filippo Gomez (ITA), Masoud Rezvani (IRI)

Seventh place game

20 August 2016; 11:40	Report	Brazil	8–9	Spain	Olympic Aquatics Stadium, Rio de Janeiro; Referees: Vojin Putniković (SRB), Stanko Ivanovski (MNE)
20 August 2016; 11:40	Report	Score by quarters: 1–3, 2–1, 1–2, 4–3			Olympic Aquatics Stadium, Rio de Janeiro; Referees: Vojin Putniković (SRB), Stanko Ivanovski (MNE)
20 August 2016; 11:40	Report	three players 2	Goals	three players 2	Olympic Aquatics Stadium, Rio de Janeiro; Referees: Vojin Putniković (SRB), Stanko Ivanovski (MNE)

=== Women's tournament ===
The Brazil women's water polo team was automatically qualified for the Olympics as the host nation.

Team roster

The following is the Brazilian roster in the women's water polo tournament of the 2016 Summer Olympics.

Head coach: (Canada) Patrick Oaten

№	Name	Pos.	Height	Weight	Date of birth	2016 club
1	Tess Oliveira	GK	1.71 m (5 ft 7 in)	66 kg (146 lb)	6 January 1987	(Brazil) Pinheiros
2	Diana Abla	CF	1.75 m (5 ft 9 in)	70 kg (154 lb)	29 July 1995	(Brazil) Pinheiros
3	Marina Zablith (c)	CB	1.82 m (6 ft 0 in)	77 kg (170 lb)	4 March 1987	(Brazil) Pinheiros
4	Marina Canetti	CF	1.70 m (5 ft 7 in)	66 kg (146 lb)	24 January 1983	(Brazil) Flamengo
5	Lucianne Barroncas	D	1.74 m (5 ft 9 in)	68 kg (150 lb)	1 April 1988	(Brazil) Pinheiros
6	Izabella Chiappini	D	1.71 m (5 ft 7 in)	67 kg (148 lb)	28 September 1995	(Brazil) Pinheiros
7	Amanda Oliveira	D	1.71 m (5 ft 7 in)	66 kg (146 lb)	6 January 1987	(Brazil) Pinheiros
8	Luíza Carvalho	CF	1.83 m (6 ft 0 in)	77 kg (170 lb)	2 July 1983	(Brazil) Pinheiros
9	Camila Pedrosa	CF	1.72 m (5 ft 8 in)	60 kg (132 lb)	12 March 1975	(Brazil) Paulistano
10	Viviane Bahia	CB	1.76 m (5 ft 9 in)	68 kg (150 lb)	14 February 1994	(Brazil) Pinheiros
11	Mariana Duarte	W	1.65 m (5 ft 5 in)	66 kg (146 lb)	5 October 1986	(Brazil) Paineiras do Morumby
12	Gabriela Mantellato	D	1.75 m (5 ft 9 in)	72 kg (159 lb)	28 October 1991	(Brazil) Pinheiros
13	Victória Chamorro	GK	1.75 m (5 ft 9 in)	70 kg (154 lb)	10 July 1996	(Brazil) Paineiras do Morumby

Group play

Pos	Team	Pld	W	D	L	GF	GA	GD	Pts	Qualification
1	Italy	3	3	0	0	27	15	+12	6	Quarter-finals
2	Australia	3	2	0	1	31	15	+16	4	Quarter-finals
3	Russia	3	1	0	2	23	31	−8	2	Quarter-finals
4	Brazil (H)	3	0	0	3	13	33	−20	0	Quarter-finals

Source: Rio2016
Rules for classification: 1) Points; 2) Head-to-head points; 3) Head-to-head goal difference; 4) Head-to-head goals scored; 5) Goal difference.
(H) Hosts

9 August 2016; 10:20	Report	Italy	9–3	Brazil	Maria Lenk Aquatic Center, Rio de Janeiro; Referees: Diana Dutilh-Dumas (NED), Dion Willis (RSA)
9 August 2016; 10:20	Report	Score by quarters: 1–1, 2–0, 3–0, 3–2			Maria Lenk Aquatic Center, Rio de Janeiro; Referees: Diana Dutilh-Dumas (NED), Dion Willis (RSA)
9 August 2016; 10:20	Report	Bianconi 3	Goals	three players 1	Maria Lenk Aquatic Center, Rio de Janeiro; Referees: Diana Dutilh-Dumas (NED), Dion Willis (RSA)

11 August 2016; 09:00	Report	Russia	14–7	Brazil	Maria Lenk Aquatic Center, Rio de Janeiro; Referees: Diana Dutilh-Dumas (NED), Tadao Tahara (JPN)
11 August 2016; 09:00	Report	Score by quarters: 2–4, 2–0, 4–2, 6–1			Maria Lenk Aquatic Center, Rio de Janeiro; Referees: Diana Dutilh-Dumas (NED), Tadao Tahara (JPN)
11 August 2016; 09:00	Report	Ivanova, Prokofyeva 3	Goals	Chiappini 4	Maria Lenk Aquatic Center, Rio de Janeiro; Referees: Diana Dutilh-Dumas (NED), Tadao Tahara (JPN)

13 August 2016; 11:40	Report	Australia	10–3	Brazil	Maria Lenk Aquatic Center, Rio de Janeiro; Referees: Dion Willis (RSA), Benjamin Mercier (FRA)
13 August 2016; 11:40	Report	Score by quarters: 1–1, 4–1, 2–0, 3–1			Maria Lenk Aquatic Center, Rio de Janeiro; Referees: Dion Willis (RSA), Benjamin Mercier (FRA)
13 August 2016; 11:40	Report	Gofers, Webster 2	Goals	three players 3	Maria Lenk Aquatic Center, Rio de Janeiro; Referees: Dion Willis (RSA), Benjamin Mercier (FRA)

Quarterfinal

15 August 2016; 14:10	Report	Brazil	3–13	United States	Olympic Aquatics Stadium, Rio de Janeiro; Referees: Diana Dutilh-Dumas (NED), Tadao Tahara (JPN)
15 August 2016; 14:10	Report	Score by quarters: 0–5, 0–3, 0–5, 3–0			Olympic Aquatics Stadium, Rio de Janeiro; Referees: Diana Dutilh-Dumas (NED), Tadao Tahara (JPN)
15 August 2016; 14:10	Report	three players 1	Goals	four players 2	Olympic Aquatics Stadium, Rio de Janeiro; Referees: Diana Dutilh-Dumas (NED), Tadao Tahara (JPN)

Classification semifinal (5–8)

17 August 2016; 11:00	Report	Australia	11–4	Brazil	Olympic Aquatics Stadium, Rio de Janeiro; Referees: Ni Shi Wei (CHN), Marie Deslières (CAN)
17 August 2016; 11:00	Report	Score by quarters: 2–1, 3–1, 4–1, 2–1			Olympic Aquatics Stadium, Rio de Janeiro; Referees: Ni Shi Wei (CHN), Marie Deslières (CAN)
17 August 2016; 11:00	Report	Arancini, Southern 3	Goals	Chiappini 2	Olympic Aquatics Stadium, Rio de Janeiro; Referees: Ni Shi Wei (CHN), Marie Deslières (CAN)

Seventh place game

19 August 2016; 10:00	Report	Brazil	5–10	China	Olympic Aquatics Stadium, Rio de Janeiro; Referees: Daniel Flahive (AUS), Nenad Peris (CRO)
19 August 2016; 10:00	Report	Score by quarters: 2–2, 0–2, 0–2, 3–4			Olympic Aquatics Stadium, Rio de Janeiro; Referees: Daniel Flahive (AUS), Nenad Peris (CRO)
19 August 2016; 10:00	Report	Chiappini 3	Goals	three players 2	Olympic Aquatics Stadium, Rio de Janeiro; Referees: Daniel Flahive (AUS), Nenad Peris (CRO)

== Weightlifting ==
As the hosts, Brazilian weightlifters have already received three men's and two women's quota places for the Rio Olympics. The team must allocate these places to individual athletes by 20 June 2016. The weightlifting team was named to the Olympic roster on 19 June 2016.

Athlete	Event	Snatch		Clean & Jerk		Total	Rank
Athlete	Event	Result	Rank	Result	Rank	Total	Rank
Welisson Silva	Men's −85 kg	145	18	180	17	325	17
Mateus Gregório	Men's −105 kg	170	13	~~200~~	—	—	DNF
Fernando Reis	Men's +105 kg	195	5	240	6	435 AM	5
Rosane Santos	Women's −53 kg	90 AM	5	103	7	193	5
Jaqueline Ferreira	Women's −75 kg	~~103~~	DNF	—	—	—	DNF

== Wrestling ==
Brazilian wrestlers have been offered three guaranteed places at the Games by virtue of the host nation. If any wrestlers qualify directly through the qualification process, these places were to be reduced.

One of them had claimed the Olympic spot in the women's freestyle 75 kg at the 2015 World Championships, while four more places were awarded to the Brazilian wrestlers, who progressed to the top two finals at the 2016 Pan American Qualification Tournament.

Key:

- VT – Victory by Fall.
- PP – Decision by Points – the loser with technical points.
- PO – Decision by Points – the loser without technical points.
- ST – Decision by points – the loser without technical points and a margin of victory of at least 8 (Greco-Roman) or 10 (freestyle) points.

Men's Greco-Roman

Athlete	Event	Qualification	Round of 16	Quarterfinal	Semifinal	Repechage 1	Repechage 2	Final / BM	
Athlete	Event	Opposition Result	Opposition Result	Opposition Result	Opposition Result	Opposition Result	Opposition Result	Opposition Result	Rank
Eduard Soghomonyan	−130 kg	Kajaia (GEO); L 0–4 ^{ST}	Did not advance						16

Women's freestyle

Athlete	Event	Qualification	Round of 16	Quarterfinal	Semifinal	Repechage 1	Repechage 2	Final / BM	
Athlete	Event	Opposition Result	Opposition Result	Opposition Result	Opposition Result	Opposition Result	Opposition Result	Opposition Result	Rank
Joice Souza da Silva	−58 kg	Bye	Tynybekova (KGZ); L 1–3 ^{PP}	Did not advance					12
Laís Nunes	−63 kg	Şahin (TUR); L 0–5 ^{VT}	Did not advance						15
Gilda Oliveira	−69 kg	Bye	Kratysh (ISR); W 3–1 ^{PP}	Mostafa (EGY); L 0–5 ^{VT}	Did not advance				10
Aline Ferreira	−75 kg	Bye	Watari (JPN); W 3–1 ^{PP}	Bukina (RUS); L 1–3 ^{PP}	Did not advance				9

== See also ==
- Brazil at the 2015 Pan American Games
- Brazil at the 2016 Winter Youth Olympics
- Brazil at the 2016 Summer Paralympics
