= Rodrigo Steimbach =

Brazilian field hockey player (born 1996)

Personal information
- Full name: Rodrigo Steimbach Silva
- Born: 30 January 1996 (age 30) Rio de Janeiro, Brazil
- Height: 1.61 m (5 ft 3 in)
- Weight: 59 kg (130 lb)

Sport
- Sport: Field hockey
National team
Years	Team	Caps	Goals
2015–2016	Brazil	11	(0)

Rodrigo Steimbach Silva (born 30 January 1996) is a Brazilian field hockey player. He competed in the men's field hockey tournament at the 2016 Summer Olympics.
