= Júlia Sardá =

- Born: December 1, 1982 (age 43)
- Height: 1.74 m (5 ft 8 1/2 in)
- Weight: 65 kg (143 lb; 10 st 3 lb)

Rugby union career
National sevens team
| Years | Team | Comps |
- Brazil

Júlia Sardá (born December 1, 1982) is a Brazilian rugby sevens player. She was selected as a member of the Brazil women's national rugby sevens team to the 2016 Summer Olympics.
