= Victoria Lovelady =

Brazilian professional golfer (born 1986)

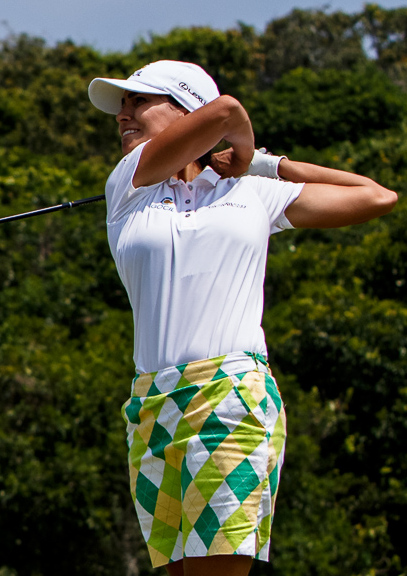
- Lovelady in 2016

Personal information
- Nationality: Brazil
- Born: 29 November 1986 (age 39)
- Height: 5 ft 4 in (163 cm)

Career
- Sport: Golf
- Status: Professional
- Current tour: Ladies European Tour (2014–)
- Former tour: Symetra Tour (2012–13)

Victoria Lovelady (born 29 November 1986) is a Brazilian professional golfer.

Lovelady qualified for the 2016 Summer Olympics.

== Early life and amateur golf career ==
Victoria Alimonda, now known as Victoria Lovelady after marriage, began playing golf at the age of 12. She also enjoys playing the guitar, composing music and surfing.

== Professional career ==
Lovelady played on the Symetra Tour in 2012 and 2013 and has played on the Ladies European Tour since 2014.
