= List of archers at the 2016 Summer Olympics =

This is a list of the archers who participated for their country at the 2016 Summer Olympics in Rio de Janeiro, Brazil from August 5–21, 2016. 128 archers in the Olympic standard recurve discipline were set to participate at the Games.

== Male archers ==
- Entry list at 1 August 2016

NOC	Name	Age	Hometown	World ranking	Team ranking
Australia	Alec Potts	February 9, 1996 (aged 20)	(Australia) (South Australia) Clayton Bay	108	19
Australia	Ryan Tyack	June 2, 1991 (aged 25)	(Australia) (Queensland) Brisbane	59	19
Australia	Taylor Worth	January 8, 1991 (aged 25)	(Australia) (Western Australia) Yangebup	15	19
Belarus	Anton Prilepov	February 5, 1984 (aged 32)	(Belarus) Mogilev	18	
Belgium	Robin Ramaekers	October 26, 1994 (aged 21)	(Belgium) Tongeren	97	
Brazil	Marcus Dalmeida	January 30, 1998 (aged 18)	(Brazil) (Rio de Janeiro (state)) Rio de Janeiro	17	17
Brazil	Bernardo Oliveira	June 8, 1993 (aged 23)	(Brazil) (Federal District (Brazil)) Brasília	99	17
Brazil	Daniel Rezende Xavier	August 31, 1982 (aged 33)	(Brazil) (Minas Gerais) Belo Horizonte	114	17
Canada	Crispin Duenas	January 5, 1986 (aged 30)	(Canada) (Ontario) Toronto	20	
Chile	Ricardo Soto	October 20, 1999 (aged 16)	(Chile) Arica	113	
China	Gu Xuesong	June 21, 1993 (aged 23)	(China) Shanghai	39	3
China	Wang Dapeng	December 3, 1996 (aged 19)	(China) Huangdao	118	3
China	Xing Yu	March 12, 1991 (aged 25)	(China) Beijing	12	3
Chinese Taipei	Kao Hao-wen	March 17, 1995 (aged 21)	(Chinese Taipei) Hualien	31	6
Chinese Taipei	Wei Chun-heng	July 6, 1994 (aged 22)	(Chinese Taipei) Taoyuan	10	6
Chinese Taipei	Yu Guan-lin	November 29, 1993 (aged 22)	(Chinese Taipei) Nantou	55	6
Colombia	Andrés Pila	May 11, 1991 (aged 25)	(Colombia) Montelíbano	82	
Cuba	Adrian Andres Puentes Perez	July 3, 1988 (aged 28)	(Cuba) Sancti Spíritus	123	
Egypt	Ahmed El-Nemr	November 21, 1978 (aged 37)	(Egypt) Cairo	156	
Fiji	Robert Elder	April 25, 1981 (aged 35)	(Fiji) Suva	199	
Finland	Samuli Piippo	January 1, 1980 (aged 36)	(Finland) Oulu	75	
France	Lucas Daniel	January 1, 1995 (aged 21)	(France) Riom	25	15
France	Pierre Plihon	October 29, 1989 (aged 26)	(France) Nice	42	15
France	Jean-Charles Valladont	March 20, 1989 (aged 27)	(France) Champigny-sur-Marne	4	15
Germany	Florian Floto	April 12, 1988 (aged 28)	(Germany) (Lower Saxony) Braunschweig	77	
Great Britain	Patrick Huston	January 5, 1996 (aged 20)	(United Kingdom) (Northern Ireland) Belfast	38	
India	Atanu Das	April 5, 1992 (aged 24)	(India) Kolkata	22	
Indonesia	Riau Ega Agatha	November 25, 1991 (aged 24)	(Indonesia) Blitar	29	14
Indonesia	Hendra Purnama	November 12, 1997 (aged 18)	(Indonesia) Bantul	98	14
Indonesia	Muhammad Wijaya	November 22, 1996 (aged 19)	(Indonesia) Jambi	209	14
Italy	Marco Galiazzo	May 9, 1983 (aged 33)	(Italy) Padua	381	5
Italy	Mauro Nespoli	November 22, 1987 (aged 28)	(Italy) Vigna di Valle	11	5
Italy	David Pasqualucci	June 27, 1996 (aged 20)	(Italy) Genzano di Roma	28	5
France	Rene Philippe Kouassi	December 14, 1979 (aged 36)	(France) Angers	279	
Japan	Takaharu Furukawa	August 9, 1984 (aged 31)	(Japan) Aomori	19	
Kazakhstan	Sultan Duzelbayev	March 12, 1994 (aged 22)	(Kazakhstan) Almaty	125	
Libya	Ali Elghari	January 31, 1997 (aged 19)	(Libya) Tripoli	440	
Malawi	Areneo David	June 6, 1995 (aged 21)	(Malawi) Gumulira	440	
Malaysia	Haziq Kamaruddin	July 21, 1993 (aged 23)	(Malaysia) Kuala Lumpur	100	18
Malaysia	Khairul Anuar Mohamad	September 22, 1991 (aged 24)	(Malaysia) Kemaman	41	18
Malaysia	Muhammad Akmal Nor Hasrin	July 15, 1995 (aged 21)	(Malaysia) Kuala Lumpur	235	18
Mexico	Ernesto Boardman	February 23, 1993 (aged 23)	(Mexico) (Coahuila) Arteaga	16	
Mongolia	Gantugs Jantsan	April 12, 1972 (aged 44)	(Mongolia) Ulaanbaatar	114	
Nepal	Jitbahadur Muktan	August 31, 1979 (aged 36)	(Nepal) Kathmandu	338	
Netherlands	Mitch Dielemans	January 6, 1993 (aged 23)	(Netherlands) Geldrop	51	7
Netherlands	Sjef van den Berg	April 14, 1995 (aged 21)	(Netherlands) Oss	5	7
Netherlands	Rick van der Ven	April 14, 1991 (aged 25)	(Netherlands) Arnhem	7	7
Norway	Baard Nesteng	May 14, 1979 (aged 37)	(Norway) Fredrikstad	52	
Slovakia	Boris Balaz	November 20, 1997 (aged 18)	(Slovakia) Liptovský Mikuláš	202	
South Korea	Kim Woo-jin	June 20, 1992 (aged 24)	(South Korea) Chungju	1	1
South Korea	Ku Bon-chan	January 31, 1993 (aged 23)	(South Korea) Andong	2	1
South Korea	Lee Seung-yun	April 18, 1995 (aged 21)	(South Korea) Seoul	8	1
Spain	Miguel Alvarino Garcia	May 31, 1994 (aged 22)	(Spain) (Galicia (Spain)) A Coruña	9	9
Spain	Antonio Fernandez	June 12, 1991 (aged 25)	(Spain) (Extremadura) Cáceres	23	9
Spain	Juan Rodriguez Liebana	June 19, 1992 (aged 24)	(Spain) (Community of Madrid) Madrid	30	9
Thailand	Witthaya Thamwong	September 19, 1987 (aged 28)	(Thailand) Lampang	101	
Tonga	Hans Arne Jensen	February 25, 1998 (aged 18)	(Tonga) Nuku'alofa	869	
Turkey	Mete Gazoz	June 8, 1999 (aged 17)	(Turkey) Istanbul	14	
Ukraine	Viktor Ruban	May 24, 1981 (aged 35)	(Ukraine) Kharkiv	36	
United States	Brady Ellison	October 27, 1988 (aged 27)	(United States) (Arizona) Globe	6	2
United States	Zach Garrett	April 8, 1995 (aged 21)	(United States) (Missouri) Wellington	3	2
United States	Jake Kaminski	August 11, 1988 (aged 27)	(United States) (New York (state)) Elma	26	2
Venezuela	Elias Malave	October 26, 1989 (aged 26)	(Venezuela) Maturín	35	
Great Britain	Gavin Ben Sutherland	June 26, 1979 (aged 37)	(United Kingdom) Worthing	177	

== Female archers ==
- Entry list at 1 August 2016

NOC	Name	Age	Hometown	World ranking	Team ranking
Australia	Alice Ingley	January 13, 1993 (aged 23)	(Australia) (Western Australia) Perth	353	
Austria	Laurence Baldauff	November 19, 1974 (aged 41)	(Austria) Vienna	93	
Azerbaijan	Olga Senyuk	January 23, 1991 (aged 25)	(Azerbaijan) Baku	83	
Bangladesh	Shamoli Ray	April 5, 1994 (aged 22)	(Bangladesh) Dhaka	175	
Bhutan	Karma Karma	June 6, 1990 (aged 26)	(Bhutan) Trashiyangtse	229	
Brazil	Marina Canetta	April 1, 1989 (aged 27)	(Brazil) (São Paulo (state)) São Paulo	105	20
Brazil	Ane Marcelle dos Santos	January 12, 1994 (aged 22)	(Brazil) (Rio de Janeiro (state)) Maricá	64	20
Brazil	Sarah Nikitin	December 27, 1988 (aged 27)	(Brazil) (São Paulo (state)) São Paulo	126	20
Canada	Georcy Thiffeault Picard	February 8, 1991 (aged 25)	(Canada) (Quebec) Montreal	46	
China	Cao Hui	September 7, 1991 (aged 24)	(China) Liaoning	34	6
China	Qi Yuhong	August 25, 1989 (aged 26)	(China) Shanghai	21	6
China	Wu Jiaxin	February 28, 1997 (aged 19)	(China) Shanghai	20	6
Chinese Taipei	Le Chien-ying	April 17, 1990 (aged 26)	(Chinese Taipei) Taipei	7	4
Chinese Taipei	Lin Shih-chia	May 20, 1993 (aged 23)	(Chinese Taipei) Hsinchu	10	4
Chinese Taipei	Tan Ya-ting	November 7, 1993 (aged 22)	(Chinese Taipei) Hsinchu	2	4
Colombia	Carolina Aguirre	January 29, 1996 (aged 20)	(Colombia) Antioquia	79	13
Colombia	Ana Rendón	March 10, 1986 (aged 30)	(Colombia) Medellín	27	13
Colombia	Natalia Sánchez	March 20, 1983 (aged 33)	(Colombia) Medellín	36	13
Dominican Republic	Yessica Camilo Gonzalez	April 23, 1993 (aged 23)	(Dominican Republic) Santo Domingo	157	
Egypt	Reem Mansour	December 20, 1993 (aged 22)	(Egypt) Cairo	179	
Estonia	Laura Nurmsalu	June 1, 1994 (aged 22)	(Estonia) Viljandi	75	
Finland	Taru Kuoppa	November 14, 1983 (aged 32)	(Finland) Lahti	96	
Georgia	Kristine Esebua	March 19, 1985 (aged 31)	(Georgia (country)) Khobi	8	7
Georgia	Yuliya Lobzhenidze	August 23, 1977 (aged 38)	(Georgia (country)) Tbilisi	85	7
Georgia	Khatuna Narimanidze	February 2, 1974 (aged 42)	(Georgia (country)) Batumi	37	7
Germany	Lisa Unruh	April 12, 1988 (aged 28)	(Germany) Berlin	16	
Great Britain	Naomi Folkard	September 18, 1983 (aged 32)	(United Kingdom) (England) Leamington Spa	67	
Greece	Evangelia Psarra	June 17, 1974 (aged 42)	(Greece) Thessaloniki	95	
India	Deepika Kumari	June 13, 1994 (aged 22)	(India) Jamshedpur	12	4
India	Bombayla Devi Laishram	February 22, 1985 (aged 31)	(India) Imphal	69	4
India	Laxmirani Majhi	January 26, 1989 (aged 27)	(India) Chittaranjan	15	4
Indonesia	Ika Rochmawati	July 2, 1989 (aged 27)	(Indonesia) Bojonegoro	26	
Iran	Zahra Nemati	April 30, 1985 (aged 31)	(Iran) Tehran	47	
Italy	Lucilla Boari	March 24, 1997 (aged 19)	(Italy) Mantua	24	9
Italy	Claudia Mandia	October 21, 1992 (aged 23)	(Italy) Salerno	74	9
Italy	Guendalina Sartori	August 8, 1988 (aged 27)	(Italy) Monselice	17	9
Japan	Yuki Hayashi	October 2, 1984 (aged 31)	(Japan) Kawanishi	33	10
Japan	Kaori Kawanaka	August 3, 1991 (aged 25)	(Japan) Kotoura	13	10
Japan	Saori Nagamine	July 5, 1993 (aged 23)	(Japan) Nagasaki	61	10
Kazakhstan	Luiza Saidiyeva	March 17, 1994 (aged 22)	(Kazakhstan) Shymkent	107	
Kenya	Shehzana Anwar	August 21, 1989 (aged 26)	(Kenya) Nairobi	195	
Mexico	Gabriela Bayardo	February 18, 1994 (aged 22)	(Mexico) (Baja California) Tijuana	62	12
Mexico	Aida Roman	May 21, 1988 (aged 28)	Mexico City	14	12
Mexico	Alejandra Valencia	October 17, 1994 (aged 21)	(Mexico) (Sonora) Hermosillo	18	12
Moldova	Alexandra Mirca	October 11, 1993 (aged 22)	(Moldova) Chișinău	60	
Myanmar	San Yu Htwe	October 14, 1986 (aged 29)	(Myanmar) Mindat	191	
North Korea	Kang Un-ju	February 1, 1995 (aged 21)	(North Korea) Pyongyang	72	
Poland	Karina Lipiarska-Palka	February 16, 1987 (aged 29)	(Poland) Gmina Zabierzów	41	
Russia	Tuiana Dashidorzhieva	April 14, 1996 (aged 20)	(Russia) (Zabaykalsky Krai) Chita	11	2
Russia	Ksenia Perova	February 8, 1989 (aged 27)	(Russia) (Sverdlovsk Oblast) Lesnoy	5	2
Russia	Inna Stepanova	April 17, 1990 (aged 26)	(Russia) (Buryatia) Ulan-Ude	48	2
Slovakia	Alexandra Longova	February 7, 1994 (aged 22)	(Slovakia) Viničné	57	
South Korea	Hye Jin Chang	May 13, 1987 (aged 29)	(South Korea) Daegu	6	1
South Korea	Choi Mi-sun	July 1, 1996 (aged 20)	(South Korea) Gwangju	1	1
South Korea	Ki Bo-bae	February 20, 1988 (aged 28)	(South Korea) Gwangju	3	1
Spain	Adriana Martin	April 17, 1997 (aged 19)	(Spain) (Community of Madrid) Madrid	51	
Sweden	Christine Bjerendal	February 3, 1987 (aged 29)	(Sweden) Lindome	77	
Tonga	Karoline Lusitania Tatafu	February 20, 1998 (aged 18)	(Tonga) Nuku'alofa	309	
Turkey	Yasemin Anagoz	October 14, 1998 (aged 17)	(Turkey) İzmir	31	
Ukraine	Veronika Marchenko	April 3, 1993 (aged 23)	(Ukraine) Lviv	9	8
Ukraine	Anastasia Pavlova	February 9, 1995 (aged 21)	(Ukraine) Nova Kakhovka	44	8
Ukraine	Lidiia Sichenikova	February 3, 1993 (aged 23)	(Ukraine) Chernivtsi	45	8
United States	Mackenzie Brown	March 14, 1995 (aged 21)	(United States) (Texas) Flint	4	
Venezuela	Leidys Brito	July 5, 1984 (aged 32)	(Venezuela) Maturín	55	
