= 2015 World Archery Championships – Women's individual recurve =

Women's individual recurve at the 2015 World Archery Championships
- Location: Copenhagen
- Dates: 27 July – 2 August
- Competitors: 157 from 64 nations

Medalists
| gold medal | Ki Bo-bae | South Korea |
| silver medal | Lin Shih-chia | Chinese Taipei |
| bronze medal | Choi Mi-sun | South Korea |

The women's individual recurve competition at the 2015 World Archery Championships took place from 27 July to 2 August 2015 in Copenhagen, Denmark. The defending champion from the 2013 championship was Maja Jager of Denmark.

The top 8 competitors, excluding those whose countries earned team qualifying spots in the team event, earned an individual qualifying spot for their country for the 2016 Summer Olympics. Only 1 spot per country could be earned this way. An Olympic Secondary Tournament was held to rank competitors reaching the same round.

== Schedule ==
All times are local (UTC+01:00).

| Date | Time | Phase |
|---|---|---|
| 26 July | 09:00 | Official practice |
| 27 July | 09:00 | Qualification |
| 29 July | 09:30 | 1/48 and 1/24 Eliminations |
| 30 July | 09:00 | 1/16, 1/8, QF, and SF Eliminations |
| 2 August | 15:00 | Medal matches |

== Qualification round ==
Bye to third round
Qualified for eliminations

| Rank | Name | Nation | Score | 10s | Xs | WR |
|---|---|---|---|---|---|---|
| 1 | Lin Shih-chia | Chinese Taipei | 667 | 28 | 10 | 30 |
| 2 | Ki Bo-bae | South Korea | 665 | 31 | 10 | 2 |
| 3 | Kang Chae-young | South Korea | 665 | 28 | 13 | 15 |
| 4 | Zhu Jueman | China | 664 | 32 | 10 | 57 |
| 5 | Alejandra Valencia | Mexico | 663 | 24 | 4 | 17 |
| 6 | Choi Mi-sun | South Korea | 661 | 31 | 14 | 3 |
| 7 | Tan Ya-ting | Chinese Taipei | 661 | 25 | 7 | 26 |
| 8 | Deepika Kumari | India | 657 | 27 | 12 | 8 |
| 9 | Aída Román | Mexico | 655 | 24 | 9 | 6 |
| 10 | Khatuna Narimanidze | Georgia | 654 | 27 | 7 | 71 |
| 11 | Choe Ok-sil | North Korea | 654 | 26 | 6 | 340 |
| 12 | Kaori Kawanaka | Japan | 653 | 28 | 5 | 16 |
| 13 | Natalia Valeeva | Italy | 652 | 27 | 7 | 76 |
| 14 | Veronika Marchenko | Ukraine | 652 | 18 | 3 | 60 |
| 15 | Maja Jager | Denmark | 652 | 18 | 3 | 5 |
| 16 | Inna Stepanova | Russia | 651 | 29 | 12 | 13 |
| 17 | Le Thi Thu Hien | Vietnam | 651 | 23 | 6 | 145 |
| 18 | Karina Winter | Germany | 650 | 24 | 6 | 4 |
| 19 | Yuan Shu-chi | Chinese Taipei | 650 | 24 | 5 | 34 |
| 20 | Wu Jiaxin | China | 649 | 19 | 8 | 43 |
| 21 | Adriana Martín | Spain | 648 | 24 | 9 | 73 |
| 22 | Alexandra Longová | Slovakia | 647 | 25 | 8 | 58 |
| 23 | Guendalina Sartori | Italy | 647 | 21 | 9 | 23 |
| 24 | Ana Rendón | Colombia | 647 | 21 | 5 | 19 |
| 25 | Qi Yuhong | China | 646 | 21 | 4 | 188 |
| 26 | Ika Yuliana Rochmawati | Indonesia | 645 | 23 | 6 | 18 |
| 27 | Elena Richter | Germany | 643 | 24 | 10 | 21 |
| 28 | Natalia Sánchez | Colombia | 643 | 24 | 9 | 20 |
| 29 | Kristine Esebua | Georgia | 640 | 22 | 7 | 72 |
| 30 | Carina Rosenvinge | Denmark | 639 | 20 | 9 | 80 |
| 31 | Tuyana Dashidorzhieva | Russia | 639 | 14 | 7 | 67 |
| 32 | Saori Nagamine | Japan | 638 | 25 | 4 | 153 |
| 33 | Ksenia Perova | Russia | 637 | 20 | 5 | 77 |
| 34 | Lidiia Sichenikova | Ukraine | 637 | 15 | 7 | 35 |
| 35 | Karina Lipiarska | Poland | 636 | 22 | 6 | 102 |
| 36 | Laura Ruggieri | France | 636 | 19 | 4 | 55 |
| 37 | La Nola Pritchard | United States | 635 | 16 | 7 | 39 |
| 38 | Elin Kattstrom | Sweden | 634 | 23 | 9 | – |
| 39 | Naomi Folkard | United Kingdom | 634 | 22 | 2 | 66 |
| 40 | Titik Kusuma Wardani | Indonesia | 634 | 19 | 4 | 126 |
| 41 | Christine Bjerendal | Sweden | 634 | 16 | 4 | 240 |
| 42 | Kang Un-ju | North Korea | 633 | 19 | 6 | 48 |
| 43 | Karyna Dziominskaya | Belarus | 633 | 19 | 3 | 100 |
| 44 | Leidys Brito | Venezuela | 633 | 18 | 3 | 65 |
| 45 | Yasemin Anagöz | Turkey | 632 | 22 | 7 | 75 |
| 46 | Ariel Gibilaro | United States | 631 | 21 | 7 | 92 |
| 47 | Yuki Hayashi | Japan | 631 | 20 | 5 | 42 |
| 48 | Semra Lingard | Australia | 631 | 19 | 3 | 307 |
| 49 | Simona Bancila | Romania | 630 | 21 | 5 | 164 |
| 50 | Melika Abdolkarimi | Iran | 630 | 20 | 5 | 173 |
| 51 | Taru Kuoppa | Finland | 629 | 22 | 7 | 231 |
| 52 | Laxmirani Majhi | India | 629 | 18 | 2 | 111 |
| 53 | Maydenia Sarduy | Cuba | 629 | 14 | 5 | 49 |
| 54 | Khatuna Lorig | United States | 628 | 16 | 5 | 9 |
| 55 | Miroslava Danzandorj | Mongolia | 627 | 20 | 5 | 135 |
| 56 | Ana Umer | Slovenia | 627 | 17 | 7 | 172 |
| 57 | Aruzhan Abdrazak | Kazakhstan | 627 | 16 | 5 | 355 |
| 58 | Bishindee Urantungalag | Mongolia | 627 | 15 | 3 | 134 |
| 59 | Alexandra Mîrca | Moldova | 627 | 14 | 5 | 137 |
| 60 | Bérengère Schuh | France | 626 | 17 | 5 | 62 |
| 61 | Solenne Thomas | France | 626 | 14 | 3 | 120 |
| 62 | Ekaterina Timofeyeva | Belarus | 625 | 24 | 10 | 63 |
| 63 | Karla Hinojosa | Mexico | 625 | 18 | 7 | 115 |
| 64 | Lisa Unruh | Germany | 625 | 16 | 7 | 25 |
| 65 | Miriam Alarcón | Spain | 624 | 18 | 7 | 73 |
| 66 | Alicia Marín | Spain | 624 | 13 | 5 | 28 |
| 67 | Yulia Lobzhenidze | Georgia | 624 | 10 | 1 | 36 |
| 68 | Hanna Marusava | Belarus | 622 | 18 | 7 | 37 |
| 69 | Larissa Rodrigues | Brazil | 621 | 17 | 3 | 136 |
| 70 | Rimil Buriuly | India | 621 | 13 | 4 | 260 |
| 71 | Karen Hultzer | South Africa | 619 | 15 | 0 | 204 |
| 72 | Loc Thi Dao | Vietnam | 619 | 11 | 4 | 129 |
| 73 | Choe Song-hui | North Korea | 618 | 21 | 5 | 155 |
| 74 | Kateri Vrakking | Canada | 618 | 11 | 7 | 95 |
| 75 | Shiva Khoramshahi | Iran | 617 | 18 | 4 | 237 |
| 76 | Deonne Bridger | Australia | 617 | 16 | 3 | 213 |
| 77 | Evangelia Psarra | Greece | 617 | 14 | 4 | 91 |
| 78 | Esther Deden | Netherlands | 617 | 12 | 5 | 78 |
| 79 | Begünhan Ünsal | Turkey | 616 | 19 | 3 | 103 |
| 80 | Zahra Nemati | Iran | 615 | 17 | 5 | 69 |
| 81 | Shamoli Ray | Bangladesh | 615 | 14 | 6 | 183 |
| 82 | Aybuke Aktuna | Turkey | 615 | 12 | 7 | 117 |
| 83 | Virginie Chénier | Canada | 613 | 13 | 5 | 164 |
| 84 | Milena Barakonska | Poland | 613 | 12 | 5 | 126 |
| 85 | Amy Oliver | United Kingdom | 612 | 12 | 6 | 86 |
| 86 | Luiza Saidiyeva | Kazakhstan | 611 | 17 | 9 | 81 |
| 87 | Elena Tonetta | Italy | 611 | 13 | 5 | 45 |
| 88 | Rachelle Anne De La Cruz | Philippines | 610 | 13 | 4 | 288 |
| 89 | Olga Senyuk | Azerbaijan | 610 | 11 | 3 | 147 |
| 90 | Kateryna Yavorska | Ukraine | 608 | 15 | 6 | 227 |
| 91 | Sarah Nikitin | Brazil | 608 | 15 | 2 | 41 |
| 92 | Laurence Baldauff | Austria | 607 | 14 | 4 | 131 |
| 93 | Karma | Bhutan | 606 | 16 | 4 | 294 |
| 94 | Erika Jangnas | Sweden | 606 | 13 | 4 | 176 |
| 95 | Diananda Choirunisa | Indonesia | 605 | 19 | 8 | 68 |
| 96 | Laura Nurmsalu | Estonia | 605 | 14 | 2 | 110 |
| 97 | Ane Marcelle dos Santos | Brazil | 605 | 12 | 5 | 50 |
| 98 | Zuzana Lucanicova | Slovakia | 605 | 11 | 3 | 389 |
| 99 | Nur Afisa Abdul Halil | Malaysia | 603 | 15 | 6 | 201 |
| 100 | Natalia Leśniak | Poland | 603 | 15 | 4 | 32 |
| 101 | Georcy Thiffeault Picard | Canada | 603 | 10 | 1 | 106 |
| 102 | Mayra Mendez | Venezuela | 602 | 15 | 6 | 84 |
| 103 | Celine Schobinger | Switzerland | 601 | 15 | 4 | 191 |
| 104 | Nathalie Dielen | Switzerland | 601 | 10 | 5 | 154 |
| 105 | Maira Sepúlveda | Colombia | 601 | 15 | 5 | 56 |
| 106 | Mirjam Tuokkola | Finland | 600 | 17 | 6 | – |
| 107 | Magret Pleschberger | Austria | 600 | 9 | 2 | 476 |
| 108 | Elena Mousikou | Cyprus | 599 | 14 | 5 | 502 |
| 109 | Amira Mansour | Egypt | 599 | 14 | 4 | 141 |
| 110 | Sandra Prinsloo | South Africa | 599 | 10 | 3 | 180 |
| 111 | Mathui Prue Marma | Bangladesh | 598 | 12 | 3 | 114 |
| 112 | Munira Nurmanova | Uzbekistan | 598 | 8 | 0 | 374 |
| 113 | Dobromira Danailova | Bulgaria | 597 | 15 | 4 | 187 |
| 114 | Asel Sharbekova | Kyrgyzstan | 597 | 13 | 4 | 374 |
| 115 | Kahreel Meer Hongitan | Philippines | 597 | 9 | 2 | 124 |
| 116 | Sabine Mayrhofer Gritsch | Austria | 595 | 10 | 3 | 166 |
| 117 | Heli Kukkohovi | Finland | 595 | 9 | 2 | 294 |
| 118 | Zuzana Panikova | Czech Republic | 594 | 13 | 8 | 432 |
| 119 | Sarah Kwaks | Netherlands | 594 | 12 | 4 | – |
| 120 | Shin Hui Loke | Malaysia | 594 | 12 | 3 | 194 |
| 121 | Anatoli Martha Gkorila | Greece | 593 | 13 | 5 | 243 |
| 122 | Firuza Zubaydova | Tajikistan | 593 | 13 | 3 | 218 |
| 123 | Ariadni Chorti | Greece | 593 | 12 | 4 | 130 |
| 124 | Reena Pärnat | Estonia | 593 | 6 | 2 | 107 |
| 125 | Irina Savinova | Uzbekistan | 592 | 18 | 7 | 374 |
| 126 | Ximena Mendiberry | Argentina | 592 | 15 | 4 | 152 |
| 127 | Verona Villegas | Venezuela | 591 | 8 | 4 | 374 |
| 128 | Paulina Baloghova | Slovakia | 588 | 11 | 3 | 622 |
| 129 | Nicky Hunt | United Kingdom | 585 | 11 | 3 | 167 |
| 130 | Natasja Bech | Denmark | 585 | 8 | 1 | 163 |
| 131 | Ingrid Brookshaw | Australia | 584 | 12 | 7 | 301 |
| 132 | Anna Stanieczek | Norway | 584 | 7 | 1 | 426 |
| 133 | Valentine De Giuli | Switzerland | 583 | 9 | 3 | – |
| 134 | Brina Bozic | Slovenia | 580 | 11 | 3 | 279 |
| 135 | Wanja Marie Richardsen | Norway | 579 | 10 | 4 | 288 |
| 136 | Gabriela Sudrichova | Czech Republic | 579 | 9 | 6 | 432 |
| 137 | Nomin-Erdene Badam | Mongolia | 579 | 8 | 3 | 687 |
| 138 | Yelena Li | Kazakhstan | 577 | 10 | 2 | 205 |
| 139 | Farah Amalina Azhar | Malaysia | 576 | 10 | 3 | 194 |
| 140 | Bianca Gotuaco | Philippines | 575 | 14 | 8 | 325 |
| 141 | Annemarie der Kinderen | Netherlands | 573 | 10 | 4 | 151 |
| 142 | Dangeruta Nosaliene | Lithuania | 572 | 11 | 2 | 441 |
| 143 | Sarah Fuller | New Zealand | 569 | 4 | 0 | 176 |
| 144 | Yesenia Valencia | Guatemala | 566 | 11 | 5 | 87 |
| 145 | Line Blomen Ridderstrom | Norway | 562 | 9 | 3 | 389 |
| 146 | Anete Kreicberga | Latvia | 551 | 6 | 3 | 227 |
| 147 | Sonam Dema | Bhutan | 550 | 7 | 1 | – |
| 148 | Madina Akramova | Uzbekistan | 549 | 9 | 2 | 622 |
| 149 | Fernanda Faisal | Argentina | 538 | 3 | 0 | 122 |
| 150 | Choki Wangmo | Bhutan | 532 | 5 | 2 | 294 |
| 151 | Siret Luik | Estonia | 529 | 6 | 3 | 226 |
| 152 | Florencia Leithold | Argentina | 523 | 8 | 2 | 125 |
| 153 | Olof Gyda Risten Svansdottir | Iceland | 513 | 7 | 3 | – |
| 154 | Amanda Warehime | United States Virgin Islands | 492 | 3 | 1 | 233 |
| 155 | Anne Abernathy | United States Virgin Islands | 488 | 6 | 3 | 169 |
| 156 | Jastrid Mathea Jensen | Faroe Islands | 452 | 2 | 0 | – |
| 157 | Sigridur Sigurdardottir | Iceland | 391 | 1 | 1 | – |

== Elimination rounds ==
=== Section 1 ===
1st round
1 | (Chinese Taipei) Lin Shih-chia
Bye
33 | (Russia) Ksenia Perova | 7
80 | (Iran) Zahra Nemati | 3
81 | (Bangladesh) Shamoli Ray | 0
32 | (Japan) Saori Nagamine | 6
17 | (Vietnam) Le Thi Thu Hien | 6*
96 | (Estonia) Laura Nurmsalu | 5
65 | (Spain) Miriam Alarcón | 3
48 | (Australia) Semra Lingard | 7
49 | (Romania) Simona Bancila | 0
64 | (Germany) Lisa Unruh | 6
97 | (Brazil) Ane Marcelle dos Santos | 6
16 | (Russia) Inna Stepanova | 2

2nd round
1 | (Chinese Taipei) Lin Shih-chia
Bye
33 | (Russia) Ksenia Perova | 6
32 | (Japan) Saori Nagamine | 2
17 | (Vietnam) Le Thi Thu Hien | 1
48 | (Australia) Semra Lingard | 7
64 | (Germany) Lisa Unruh | 6
97 | (Brazil) Ane Marcelle dos Santos | 2

3rd round
1 | (Chinese Taipei) Lin Shih-chia | 6
33 | (Russia) Ksenia Perova | 4
48 | (Australia) Semra Lingard | 0
64 | (Germany) Lisa Unruh | 6

4th round
1 | (Chinese Taipei) Lin Shih-chia | 6
64 | (Germany) Lisa Unruh | 0

=== Section 2 ===
1st round
9 | (Mexico) Aída Román | 6
104 | (Switzerland) Natalie Dielen | 2
57 | (Kazakhstan) Aruzhan Abdrazak | 7
56 | (Slovenia) Ana Umer | 1
41 | (Sweden) Christine Bjerendal | 7
72 | (Vietnam) Loc Thi Dao | 3
89 | (Azerbaijan) Olga Senyuk | 6*
24 | (Colombia) Ana Rendón | 5
25 | (China) Qi Yuhong | 6
88 | (Philippines) Rachelle Anne de la Cruz | 0
73 | (North Korea) Choe Song-hui | 4
40 | (Indonesia) Titik Kusama Wardani | 6
8 | (India) Deepika Kumari
Bye

2nd round
9 | (Mexico) Aída Román | 6
57 | (Kazakhstan) Aruzhan Abdrazak | 2
41 | (Sweden) Christine Bjerendal | 4
89 | (Azerbaijan) Olga Senyuk | 6
25 | (China) Qi Yuhong | 6
40 | (Indonesia) Titik Kusama Wardani | 4
8 | (India) Deepika Kumari
Bye

3rd round
9 | (Mexico) Aída Román | 7
89 | (Azerbaijan) Olga Senyuk | 1
25 | (China) Qi Yuhong | 6
8 | (India) Deepika Kumari | 4

4th round
9 | (Mexico) Aída Román | 7
25 | (China) Qi Yuhong | 3

=== Section 3 ===
1st round
5 | (Mexico) Alejandra Valencia
Bye
37 | (United States) La Nola Pritchard | 7
76 | (Australia) Deonne Bridger | 3
85 | (United Kingdom) Amy Oliver | 2
28 | (Colombia) Natalia Sánchez | 6
21 | (Spain) Adriana Martín | 0
92 | (Austria) Laurence Baldauff | 6
69 | (Brazil) Larissa Feitosa da Costa Rodrigues | 5
44 | (Venezuela) Leidys Brito | 6*
53 | (Cuba) Maydenia Sarduy | 4
60 | (France) Bérengère Schuh | 6
101 | (Canada) Georcy-Stephanie Thiffeault Picard | 0
12 | (Japan) Kaori Kawanaka | 6

2nd round
5 | (Mexico) Alejandra Valencia
Bye
37 | (United States) La Nola Pritchard | 6
28 | (Colombia) Natalia Sánchez | 4
92 | (Austria) Laurence Baldauff | 6
44 | (Venezuela) Leidys Brito | 2
60 | (France) Bérengère Schuh | 5
12 | (Japan) Kaori Kawanaka | 6*

3rd round
5 | (Mexico) Alejandra Valencia | 6
37 | (United States) La Nola Pritchard | 2
92 | (Austria) Laurence Baldauff | 3
12 | (Japan) Kaori Kawanaka | 7

4th round
5 | (Mexico) Alejandra Valencia | 6*
12 | (Japan) Kaori Kawanaka | 5

=== Section 4 ===
1st round
13 | (Italy) Natalia Valeeva | 6
100 | (Poland) Natalia Leśniak | 4
61 | (France) Solenne Thomas | 5
52 | (India) Laxmirani Majhi | 6*
45 | (Turkey) Yasmin Ecem Anagoz | 6
68 | (Belarus) Hanna Marusava | 2
93 | (Bhutan) Karma | 5
20 | (China) Wu Jiaxin | 6*
29 | (Georgia (country)) Kristine Esebua | 6
84 | (Poland) Milena Barakonska | 2
77 | (Greece) Evangelia Psarra | 1
36 | (France) Laura Ruggieri | 7
4 | (China) Zhu Jueman
Bye

2nd round
13 | (Italy) Natalia Valeeva | 5
52 | (India) Laxmirani Majhi | 6*
45 | (Turkey) Yasmin Ecem Anagoz | 4
20 | (China) Wu Jiaxin | 6
29 | (Georgia (country)) Kristine Esebua | 6
36 | (France) Laura Ruggieri | 2
4 | (China) Zhu Jueman
Bye

3rd round
52 | (India) Laxmirani Majhi | 7
20 | (China) Wu Jiaxin | 3
29 | (Georgia (country)) Kristine Esebua | 7
4 | (China) Zhu Jueman | 3

4th round
52 | (India) Laxmirani Majhi | 6
29 | (Georgia (country)) Kristine Esebua | 0

=== Section 5 ===
1st round
3 | (South Korea) Kang Chae-young
Bye
35 | (Poland) Karina Lipiarska | 6
78 | (Netherlands) Esther Deden | 0
83 | (Canada) Virginie Chénier | 3
30 | (Denmark) Carina Rosenvinge | 7
19 | (Chinese Taipei) Yuan Shu-chi | 6
94 | (Sweden) Erika Jangnas | 0
67 | (Georgia (country)) Yulia Lobzhenidze | 6
46 | (United States) Ariel Gibilaro | 2
51 | (Finland) Taru Kuoppa | 6
62 | (Belarus) Ekaterina Timofeyeva | 2
99 | (Malaysia) Nur Afisa Abdul Halil | 0
14 | (Ukraine) Veronika Marchenko | 6

2nd round
3 | (South Korea) Kang Chae-young
Bye
35 | (Poland) Karina Lipiarska | 6
30 | (Denmark) Carina Rosenvinge | 2
19 | (Chinese Taipei) Yuan Shu-chi | 6
67 | (Georgia (country)) Yulia Lobzhenidze | 0
51 | (Finland) Taru Kuoppa | 2
14 | (Ukraine) Veronika Marchenko | 6

3rd round
3 | (South Korea) Kang Chae-young | 6
35 | (Poland) Karina Lipiarska | 0
19 | (Chinese Taipei) Yuan Shu-chi | 5
14 | (Ukraine) Veronika Marchenko | 6*

4th round
3 | (South Korea) Kang Chae-young | 4
14 | (Ukraine) Veronika Marchenko | 6

=== Section 6 ===
1st round
11 | (North Korea) Choe Ok-sil | 2
102 | (Venezuela) Mayra Mendez | 6
59 | (Moldova) Alexandra Mîrca | 2
54 | (United States) Khatuna Lorig | 6
43 | (Belarus) Karyna Dziominskaya | 6
70 | (India) Rimil Buriuly | 0
91 | (Brazil) Sarah Nikitin | 1
22 | (Slovakia) Alexandra Longová | 7
27 | (Germany) Elena Richter | 7
86 | (Kazakhstan) Luiza Saidiyeva | 3
75 | (Iran) Shiva Khoramshahi | 0
38 | (Sweden) Elin Kattstrom | 6
6 | (South Korea) Choi Mi-sun
Bye

2nd round
102 | (Venezuela) Mayra Mendez | 5
54 | (United States) Khatuna Lorig | 6*
43 | (Belarus) Karyna Dziominskaya | 6
22 | (Slovakia) Alexandra Longová | 2
27 | (Germany) Elena Richter | 6*
38 | (Sweden) Elin Kattstrom | 5
6 | (South Korea) Choi Mi-sun
Bye

3rd round
54 | (United States) Khatuna Lorig | 6*
43 | (Belarus) Karyna Dziominskaya | 5
27 | (Germany) Elena Richter | 3
6 | (South Korea) Choi Mi-sun | 7

4th round
54 | (United States) Khatuna Lorig | 0
6 | (South Korea) Choi Mi-sun | 6

=== Section 7 ===
1st round
7 | (Chinese Taipei) Tan Ya-ting
Bye
39 | (United Kingdom) Naomi Folkard | 7
74 | (Canada) Kateri Vrakking | 3
87 | (Italy) Elena Tonetta | 2
26 | (Indonesia) Ika Yuliana Rochmawati | 6
23 | (Italy) Guendalina Sartori | 6
90 | (Ukraine) Kateryna Yavorska | 2
71 | (South Africa) Karen Hultzer | 0
42 | (North Korea) Kang Un-ju | 6
55 | (Mongolia) Miroslava Danzandorj | 6
58 | (Mongolia) Bishindee Urantungalag | 4
103 | (Switzerland) Celine Schobinger | 2
10 | (Georgia (country)) Khatuna Narimanidze | 6

2nd round
7 | (Chinese Taipei) Tan Ya-ting
Bye
39 | (United Kingdom) Naomi Folkard | 5
26 | (Indonesia) Ika Yuliana Rochmawati | 6*
23 | (Italy) Guendalina Sartori | 6
42 | (North Korea) Kang Un-ju | 2
55 | (Mongolia) Miroslava Danzandorj | 1
10 | (Georgia (country)) Khatuna Narimanidze | 7

3rd round
7 | (Chinese Taipei) Tan Ya-ting | 4
26 | (Indonesia) Ika Yuliana Rochmawati | 6
23 | (Italy) Guendalina Sartori | 0
10 | (Georgia (country)) Khatuna Narimanidze | 6

4th round
26 | (Indonesia) Ika Yuliana Rochmawati | 3
10 | (Georgia (country)) Khatuna Narimanidze | 7

=== Section 8 ===
1st round
15 | (Denmark) Maja Jager | 6
98 | (Slovakia) Zuzana Lucanicova | 0
63 | (Mexico) Karla Hinojosa | 7
50 | (Iran) Melika Abdolkarimi | 3
47 | (Japan) Yuki Hayashi | 6
66 | (Spain) Alicia Marín | 4
95 | (Indonesia) Diananda Choirunisa | 4
18 | (Germany) Karina Winter | 6
31 | (Russia) Tuyana Dashidorzhieva | 6
82 | (Turkey) Aybuke Aktuna | 0
79 | (Turkey) Begünhan Ünsal | 6
34 | (Ukraine) Lidiia Sichenikova | 2
2 | (South Korea) Ki Bo-bae
Bye

2nd round
15 | (Denmark) Maja Jager | 2
63 | (Mexico) Karla Hinojosa | 6
47 | (Japan) Yuki Hayashi | 4
18 | (Germany) Karina Winter | 6
31 | (Russia) Tuyana Dashidorzhieva | 7
79 | (Turkey) Begünhan Ünsal | 3
2 | (South Korea) Ki Bo-bae
Bye

3rd round
63 | (Mexico) Karla Hinojosa | 6
18 | (Germany) Karina Winter | 0
31 | (Russia) Tuyana Dashidorzhieva | 4
2 | (South Korea) Ki Bo-bae | 6

4th round
63 | (Mexico) Karla Hinojosa | 1
2 | (South Korea) Ki Bo-bae | 7

Note: An asterisk (*) denotes a win from a one-arrow shoot-off

== Finals ==
Quarterfinals
1 | (Chinese Taipei) Lin Shih-chia | 6 | 29 | 27 | 28 | 28
9 | (Mexico) Aída Román | 2 | 28 | 29 | 27 | 27
5 | (Mexico) Alejandra Valencia | 5 | 27 | 29 | 27 | 28 | 28
52 | (India) Laxmirani Majhi | 6* | 27 | 28 | 28 | 27 | 29
14 | (Ukraine) Veronika Marchenko | 2 | 27 | 25 | 28 | 22
6 | (South Korea) Choi Mi-sun | 6 | 27 | 28 | 28 | 27
10 | (Georgia (country)) Khatuna Narimanidze | 4 | 26 | 28 | 29 | 27 | 24
2 | (South Korea) Ki Bo-bae | 6 | 28 | 25 | 27 | 28 | 29

Semifinals
1 | (Chinese Taipei) Lin Shih-chia | 6 | 28 | 26 | 28 | 27 | 27
52 | (India) Laxmirani Majhi | 4 | 28 | 26 | 26 | 27 | 27
6 | (South Korea) Choi Mi-sun | 5 | 30 | 28 | 30 | 28 | 28
2 | (South Korea) Ki Bo-bae | 6* | 27 | 30 | 37 | 28 | 30

Finals
1 | (Chinese Taipei) Lin Shih-chia | 3 | 25 | 26 | 27 | 29 | 28
2 | (South Korea) Ki Bo-bae | 7 | 29 | 27 | 26 | 29 | 29
Third place
52 | (India) Laxmirani Majhi | 4 | 28 | 24 | 27 | 29 | 27
6 | (South Korea) Choi Mi-sun | 6 | 26 | 29 | 28 | 27 | 29

Note: An asterisk (*) denotes a win from a one-arrow shoot-off
