= Archery at the 2015 European Games – Women's individual =

Women's individual at the 2015 European Games
- Venue: Tofiq Bahramov Stadium
- Date: 16–21 June
- Competitors: 62 from 30 nations

Medalists
gold medal	Karina Winter	Germany
silver medal	Maja Jager	Denmark
bronze medal	Alicia Marín	Spain

The women's individual recurve competition at the 2015 European Games was held from 16 to 19 June 2015 at the Tofiq Bahramov Stadium in Baku, Azerbaijan. One of five events comprising the inaugural European Games' archery programme, it featured a total of 62 archers from 30 different nations.

Karina Winter of Germany won the gold medal, defeating the reigning world champion Maja Jager of Denmark in the final. Spain's Alicia Marín won the bronze medal ahead of Greece's Evangelia Psarra.

== Background ==
=== Qualification ===
Qualification for the European Games took place at the European Archery Championships in Echmiadzin, Armenia in July 2014 and at a final qualifying tournament held during the European Grand Prix in Marathon, Greece in March 2015. As the host nation, Azerbaijan automatically qualified a maximum three female archers for the Games. The quota place won by Kosovo marked their first appearance as an independent entity in the women's individual event, having been accepted as a full member of the International Olympic Committee at the end of 2014.

== Format ==
=== Schedule ===
Day	Date	Time	Stage
4	Tuesday, 16 June 2015	14:00-16:00	Ranking round
7	Friday, 19 June 2015	09:00-12:30; 14:00-17:30	1/32 elimination round
9	Sunday, 21 June 2015	09:00-12:30	1/16 elimination round
9	Sunday, 21 June 2015	14:00-18:15	1/8 elimination round
9	Sunday, 21 June 2015	14:00-18:15	Quarter-finals
9	Sunday, 21 June 2015	14:00-18:15	Semi-finals
9	Sunday, 21 June 2015	14:00-18:15	Bronze medal match
9	Sunday, 21 June 2015	14:00-18:15	Gold medal match

== Report ==
The Tofiq Bahramov Stadium was the host of the five archery events at the 2015 European Games.

The Azerbaijani team was forced to make a late change after injury forced Sugrakhanim Mugabilzada to pull out of the Games. 41-year-old Leila Fazilova was initially announced as her replacement, but Reuters reported on 13 June she had voluntarily decided to withdraw amid claims of nepotism, her husband holding the position of assistant team coach of the Azerbaijani squad. Yaylagul Ramazanova was subsequently called up as the team's third member just three days before the beginning of the competition.

On 18 June, the day before the beginning of the elimination rounds, the Dutch Olympic Committee announced that Shireen-Zoë de Vries was to return to the Netherlands due to from illness and would take no further part in the competition. The following day Kosovan archer Lirije Sahiti also withdrew from the opening elimination round after falling ill. Their respective opponents Miriam Alarcon and Natalia Valeeva were thereby given a bye to the second round.

Sartori and Tonetta, who had already won gold medals in the women's team event, each progressed to the 1/8 elimination round to face German opposition, with Sartori meeting Richter and Tonetta facing top seed Unruh. Valeeva, the third member of the victorious Italian women's team and the winner of the gold medal in the mixed team event, did not progress beyond the 1/16 elimination round, losing to Yuliya Lobzhenidze of Georgia in four sets.

== Results ==
=== Ranking round ===
Key

Advanced to 1/16 elimination round
Advanced to 1/32 elimination round

Rank	Archer	Half		Score	10s	Xs
Rank	Archer	1st	2nd	Score	10s	Xs
1	Lisa Unruh (GER)	332	330	662	26	10
2	Maja Jager (DEN)	329	328	657	27	10
3	Natalia Valeeva (ITA)	327	326	653	25	3
4	Khatuna Narimanidze (GEO)	322	331	653	22	6
5	Kristina Timofeeva (RUS)	324	326	650	22	3
6	Guendalina Sartori (ITA)	317	331	648	25	8
7	Inna Stepanova (RUS)	320	327	647	22	7
8	Natalia Erdyniyeva (RUS)	323	324	647	20	4
9	Karina Winter (GER)	322	324	646	23	6
10	Lidiia Sichenikova (UKR)	321	323	644	21	7
11	Elena Richter (GER)	318	326	644	21	3
12	Alexandra Longova (SVK)	320	322	642	22	10
13	Yasemin Anagoz (TUR)	319	323	642	21	6
14	Laura Ruggieri (FRA)	324	316	640	18	4
15	Berengere Schuh (FRA)	321	319	640	17	10
16	Elena Tonetta (ITA)	320	317	637	19	5
17	Veronika Marchenko (UKR)	321	316	637	18	5
18	Wioleta Myszor (POL)	314	322	636	23	9
19	Alicia Marín (ESP)	313	323	636	21	3
20	Ana Umer (SLO)	307	329	636	19	5
21	Anastasia Pavlova (UKR)	318	318	636	17	4
22	Hanna Marusava (BLR)	312	323	635	17	5
23	Ekaterina Timofeyeva (BLR)	320	315	635	16	4
24	Kristine Esebua (GEO)	316	318	634	15	4
25	Naomi Folkard (GBR)	318	315	633	14	4
26	Taru Kuoppa (FIN)	315	315	630	20	5
27	Shireen-Zoë de Vries (NED)	312	318	630	19	5
28	Evangelina Psarra (GRE)	317	313	630	16	2
29	Adriana Martín (ESP)	319	310	629	20	7
30	Yuliya Lobzhenidze (GEO)	307	322	629	20	7
31	Simona Băncilă (ROU)	314	315	629	19	4
32	Adriana Żurańska (POL)	315	313	628	25	7
33	Céline Schobinger (SUI)	312	316	628	19	4
34	Olqa Senyuk (AZE)	309	318	627	16	6
35	Carina Rosenvinge (DEN)	316	311	627	16	5
36	Dobromira Danailova (BUL)	313	313	626	15	3
37	Natasja Bech (DEN)	317	306	623	17	4
38	Miriam Alarcón (ESP)	320	303	623	14	1
39	Aybüke Aktuna (TUR)	311	312	623	12	2
40	Nicky Hunt (GBR)	314	307	621	17	4
41	Begünhan Elif Ünsal (TUR)	307	314	621	15	5
42	Natalia Leśniak (POL)	305	314	619	15	2
43	Solenne Thomas (FRA)	303	315	618	18	5
44	Alexandra Mirca (MDA)	312	306	618	15	5
45	Alena Tolkach (BLR)	308	309	617	14	6
46	Laura Nurmsalu (EST)	313	304	617	12	0
47	Esther Deden (NED)	314	301	615	17	6
48	Mikaella Kourouna (CYP)	310	305	615	17	4
49	Ariadni Chorti (GRE)	309	306	615	12	3
50	Sabine Mayrhofer-Gritsch (AUT)	305	306	611	11	3
51	Annemarie der Kinderen (NED)	304	304	608	12	4
52	Line Ridderstrøm (NOR)	294	310	604	17	10
53	Amy Oliver (GBR)	293	311	604	15	2
54	Anete Kreicberga (LAT)	302	302	604	11	3
55	Anatoli Martha Gkorila (GRE)	303	298	601	14	4
56	Iliana Deineko (SUI)	302	298	600	17	5
57	Sinead Cuthbert Cunningham (IRL)	304	292	596	16	3
58	Nathalie Dielen (SUI)	302	292	594	11	6
59	Dangerūta Nosalienė (LTU)	304	289	593	9	1
60	Nurlana Velieva (AZE)	300	286	586	14	3
61	Yaylagul Ramazanova (AZE)	295	287	582	10	2
62	Lirije Sahiti (KOS)	224	222	446	1	0

=== Elimination rounds ===
==== Section 1 ====
1/32 eliminations
33	Céline Schobinger (SUI)	4
32	Adriana Żurańska (POL)	6
17	Veronika Marchenko (UKR)	6
48	Mikaella Kourouna (CYP)	2
49	Ariadni Chorti (GRE)	2
16	Elena Tonetta (ITA)	6
9	Karina Winter (GER)	6
56	Iliana Deineko (SUI)	0
41	Begünhan Elif Ünsal (TUR)	6
24	Kristine Esebua (GEO)	2
25	Naomi Folkard (GBR)	0
40	Nicky Hunt (GBR)	6
57	Sinead Cuthbert Cunningham (IRL)	0
8	Natalia Erdyniyeva (RUS)	6

1/16 eliminations
1	Lisa Unruh (GER)	7
32	Adriana Żurańska (POL)	1
17	Veronika Marchenko (UKR)	3
16	Elena Tonetta (ITA)	7
9	Karina Winter (GER)	6*
41	Begünhan Elif Ünsal (TUR)	5
40	Nicky Hunt (GBR)	2
8	Natalia Erdyniyeva (RUS)	6

1/8 eliminations
1	Lisa Unruh (GER)	2
16	Elena Tonetta (ITA)	6
9	Karina Winter (GER)	7
8	Natalia Erdyniyeva (RUS)	1

Quarter-finals
16	Elena Tonetta (ITA)	1
9	Karina Winter (GER)	7

==== Section 2 ====
1/32 eliminations
5	Kristina Timofeeva (RUS)	6
60	Nurlana Velieva (AZE)	0
37	Natasja Bech (DEN)	2
28	Evangelina Psarra (GRE)	6
21	Anastasia Pavlova (UKR)	6
44	Alexandra Mirca (MDA)	0
53	Amy Oliver (GBR)	0
12	Alexandra Longova (SVK)	6
13	Yasemin Anagoz (TUR)	6
52	Line Ridderstrøm (NOR)	2
45	Alena Tolkach (BLR)	6*
20	Ana Umer (SLO)	5
29	Adriana Martín (ESP)	6
36	Dobromira Danailova (BUL)	4
61	Yaylagul Ramazanova (AZE)	4
4	Khatuna Narimanidze (GEO)	6

1/16 eliminations
5	Kristina Timofeeva (RUS)	4
28	Evangelina Psarra (GRE)	6
21	Anastasia Pavlova (UKR)	6
12	Alexandra Longova (SVK)	2
13	Yasemin Anagoz (TUR)	6
45	Alena Tolkach (BLR)	2
29	Adriana Martín (ESP)	5
4	Khatuna Narimanidze (GEO)	6*

1/8 eliminations
28	Evangelina Psarra (GRE)	6*
21	Anastasia Pavlova (UKR)	5
13	Yasemin Anagoz (TUR)	6
4	Khatuna Narimanidze (GEO)	4

Quarter-finals
28	Evangelina Psarra (GRE)	6
13	Yasemin Anagoz (TUR)	0

==== Section 3 ====
1/32 eliminations
3	Natalia Valeeva (ITA)	WO
62	Lirije Sahiti (KOS)
35	Carina Rosenvinge Christiansen (DEN)	5
30	Yuliya Lobzhenidze (GEO)	6*
19	Alicia Marín (ESP)	6
46	Laura Nurmsalu (EST)	2
51	Annemarie der Kinderen (NED)	4
14	Laura Ruggieri (FRA)	6
11	Elena Richter (GER)	6
54	Anete Kreicberga (LAT)	0
43	Solenne Thomas (FRA)	3
22	Hanna Marusava (BLR)	7
27	Shireen-Zoë de Vries (NED)
38	Miriam Alarcón (ESP)	WO
59	Dangerūta Nosalienė (LTU)	3
6	Guendalina Sartori (ITA)	7

1/16 eliminations
3	Natalia Valeeva (ITA)	2
30	Yuliya Lobzhenidze (GEO)	6
19	Alicia Marín (ESP)	6*
14	Laura Ruggieri (FRA)	5
11	Elena Richter (GER)	6
22	Hanna Marusava (BLR)	2
38	Miriam Alarcón (ESP)	4
6	Guendalina Sartori (ITA)	6

1/8 eliminations
30	Yuliya Lobzhenidze (GEO)	2
19	Alicia Marín (ESP)	6
11	Elena Richter (GER)	4
6	Guendalina Sartori (ITA)	6

Quarter-finals
19	Alicia Marín (ESP)	6
6	Guendalina Sartori (ITA)	2

==== Section 4 ====
1/32 eliminations
7	Inna Stepanova (RUS)	7
58	Nathalie Dielen (SUI)	3
39	Aybüke Aktuna (TUR)	6
26	Taru Kuoppa (FIN)	2
23	Ekaterina Timofeyeva (BLR)	6
42	Natalia Leśniak (POL)	2
55	Anatoli Martha Gkorila (GRE)	2
10	Lidiia Sichenikova (UKR)	6
15	Berengere Schuh (FRA)	6
50	Sabine Mayrhofer-Gritsch (AUT)	0
47	Esther Deden (NED)	6
18	Wioleta Myszor (POL)	4
31	S Băncilă (ROU)	5
34	O Senyuk (AZE)	6*

1/16 eliminations
7	Inna Stepanova (RUS)	6
39	Aybüke Aktuna (TUR)	2
23	Ekaterina Timofeyeva (BLR)	2
10	Lidiia Sichenikova (UKR)	6
15	Berengere Schuh (FRA)	6
47	Esther Deden (NED)	4
34	Olqa Senyuk (AZE)	3
2	Maja Jager (DEN)	7

1/8 eliminations
7	Inna Stepanova (RUS)	5
10	Lidiia Sichenikova (UKR)	6*
15	Berengere Schuh (FRA)	4
2	Maja Jager (DEN)	6

Quarter-finals
10	Lidiia Sichenikova (UKR)	1
2	Maja Jager (DEN)	7

Note: An asterisk (*) denotes a win from a one-arrow shoot-off

=== Finals ===
Semifinals
9	Karina Winter (GER)	6	28	24	28	30
28	Evangelina Psarra (GRE)	2	23	27	27	29
19	Alicia Marín (ESP)	1	27	28	26	25
2	Maja Jager (DEN)	7	27	29	29	28

Finals
9	Karina Winter (GER) (gold)	6	26	29	29	30
2	Maja Jager (DEN) (silver)	2	28	24	27	24
Third place
28	Evangelina Psarra (GRE)	4	23	27	29	26	26
19	Alicia Marín (ESP) (bronze)	6	27	26	29	30	26

== See also ==
- Archery at the 2014 Asian Games – Women's individual recurve
- Archery at the 2015 Pan American Games – Women's individual
- Archery at the 2016 Summer Olympics – Women's individual
