= 2015 World Archery Championships – Women's team recurve =

The women's team recurve competition at the 2015 World Archery Championships took place from 26 July to 2 August in Copenhagen, Denmark.

A record 45 countries entered the full quota of 3 archers into the qualification round, thus becoming eligible for the team competition. The combined totals of the 3 archers from each country in the qualification round were added together, and the 16 teams with the highest combined scores competed in the elimination rounds.

Countries reaching the quarterfinals earned a team qualification spot (and corresponding 3 individual qualifying spots) for the 2016 Summer Olympics.

== Schedule ==
All times are UTC+01:00.

Date	Time	Phase
27 July	09:00	Qualification
28 July	09:00	1/8, QF, and SF Eliminations
2 August	11:00	Medal matches

== Qualification round ==
Pre-tournament world rankings ('WR') are taken from the 18 July 2015 World Archery Rankings.

Qualified for eliminations

Rank	Nation	Name	Score	WR
1	South Korea	Choi Mi-sun; Kang Chae-young; Ki Bo-bae	1991	1
2	Chinese Taipei	Lin Shih-chia; Tan Ya-ting; Yuan Shu-chi	1978	5
3	China	Wu Jiaxin; Qi Yuhong; Zhu Jueman	1959	3
4	Mexico	Karla Hinojosa; Aída Román; Alejandra Valencia	1943	7
5	Russia	Tuyana Dashidorzhieva; Ksenia Perova; Inna Stepanova	1927	11
6	Japan	Yuki Hayashi; Kaori Kawanaka; Saori Nagamine	1922	4
7	Germany	Elena Richter; Lisa Unruh; Karina Winter	1918	2
8	Georgia	Kristine Esebua; Yulia Lobzhenidze; Khatuna Narimanidze	1918	12
9	Italy	Guendalina Sartori; Elena Tonetta; Natalia Valeeva	1910	14
10	India	Rimil Buriuly; Deepika Kumari; Laxmirani Majhi	1907	6
11	North Korea	Choe Ok-sil; Choe Song-hui; Kang Un-ju	1905	21
12	Ukraine	Veronika Marchenko; Anastasia Pavlova; Lidiia Sichenikova	1897	15
13	Spain	Miriam Alarcón; Alicia Marín; Adriana Martín	1896	20
14	United States	Ariel Gibilaro; Khatuna Lorig; La Nola Pritchard	1894	13
15	Colombia	Ana Rendón; Natalia Sánchez; Maira Sepúlveda	1891	18
16	France	Laura Ruggieri; Bérengère Schuh; Solenne Thomas	1888	8
17	Indonesia	Diananda Choirunisa; Ika Yuliana Rochmawati; Titik Kusuma Wardani	1884	19
18	Belarus	Hanna Marusava; Ekaterina Timofeyeva; Karyna Dziominskaya	1880	10
19	Denmark	Natasja Bech; Maja Jager; Carina Rosenvinge	1876	9
20	Sweden	Christine Bjerendal; Erika Jangnas; Elin Kattstrom	1874	59
21	Turkey	Aybuke Aktuna; Yasemin Anagöz; Begünhan Ünsal	1863	24
22	Iran	Melika Abdolkarimi; Shiva Khoramshahi; Zahra Nemati	1862	28
23	Poland	Milena Barakonska; Natalia Leśniak; Karina Lipiarska	1852	16
24	Slovakia	Paulina Baloghova; Alexandra Longová; Zuzana Lucanicova	1840	56
25	Brazil	Larissa Feitosa Da Costa Rodrigues; Ane Marcelle dos Santos; Sarah Nikitin	1834	33
26	Canada	Virginie Chénier; Georcy-Stephanie Thiffeault Picard; Kateri Vrakking	1834	35
27	Mongolia	Nomin-Erdene Badam; Miroslava Danzandorj; Bishindee Urantungalag	1833	26
28	Australia	Deonne Bridger; Ingrid Brookshaw; Semra Lingard	1832	59
29	United Kingdom	Naomi Folkard; Nicky Hunt; Amy Oliver	1831	17
30	Venezuela	Leidys Brito; Mayra Mendez; Verona Villegas	1826	36
31	Finland	Heli Kukkohovi; Taru Kuoppa; Mirjam Tuokkola	1824	45
32	Kazakhstan	Aruzhan Abdrazak; Yelena Li; Luiza Saidiyeva	1815	23
33	Greece	Ariadni Chorti; Anatoli Martha Gkorila; Evangelia Psarra	1803	27
34	Austria	Laurence Baldauff; Sabine Mayrhofer Gritsch; Magret Pleschberger	1802	59
35	Switzerland	Valentine De Giuli; Nathalie Dielen; Celine Schobinger	1785	41
36	Netherlands	Esther Deden; Annemarie der Kinderen; Sarah Kwaks	1784	25
37	Philippines	Rachelle Anne De La Cruz; Bianca Gotuaco; Kahreel Meer Hongitan	1782	43
38	Malaysia	Nur Afisa Abdul Halil; Farah Amalina Azhar; Shin Hui Loke	1773	30
39	Uzbekistan	Madina Akramova; Munira Nurmanova; Irina Savinova	1739	50
40	Estonia	Siret Luik; Laura Nurmsalu; Reena Pärnat	1727	22
41	Norway	Wanja Marie Richardsen; Line Blomen Ridderstrom; Anna Stanieczek	1725	48
42	Bhutan	Sonam Dema; Karma; Choki Wangmo	1688	49
43	Argentina	Fernanda Faisal; Florencia Leithold; Ximena Mendiberry	1653	38

== Elimination rounds ==
1st round
1	South Korea	2	2	1
16	France	0	0	1
9	Italy	0	1	0
8	Georgia	2	1	2
5	Russia	2	2	1	0
12	Ukraine	0	0	1	2
13	Spain	0	0	0
4	Mexico	2	2	2
3	China	2	2	1
14	United States	0	0	1
11	North Korea	1	0	0
6	Japan	1	2	2
7	Germany	2	1	0	0
10	India	0	1	2	2
15	Colombia	2	2	0	2
2	Chinese Taipei	0	0	2	0

Quarterfinals
1	South Korea	2	2	0	2
8	Georgia	0	0	2	0
5	Russia	2	2	2
4	Mexico	0	0	0
3	China	0	0	0
6	Japan	2	2	2
10	India	0	2	2	2
15	Colombia	2	0	0	0

Semifinals
1	South Korea	0	2	2	0	0
5	Russia	2	0	0	2	1
6	Japan	0	2	2	0	0
10	India	2	0	0	2	1

Finals
5	Russia	0	0	2	2	1
10	India	2	2	0	0	0
Third place
1	South Korea	2	1	2
6	Japan	0	1	0
