= Archery at the 2017 Summer Universiade – Women's individual recurve =

Women's individual recurve at the XXIX Summer Universiade
- Venues: National Taiwan Sport University Stadium
- Dates: August 20, 2017 – August 24, 2017
- Competitors: 59 from 26 nations

Medalists
1st place, gold medalist(s)		Kang Chae-young	South Korea
2nd place, silver medalist(s)		Tan Ya-ting	Chinese Taipei
3rd place, bronze medalist(s)		Alejandra Valencia	Mexico

The women's individual recurve archery competition at the 2017 Summer Universiade was held in the National Taiwan Sport University Stadium, Taipei, Taiwan between August 20–24.

== Records ==
Prior to the competition, the world and Universiade records were as follows.

Initial records

- 72 arrows ranking round

Category	Athlete	Record	Date	Place	Event
World record	(South Korea) Ki Bo-bae	686	4 July 2015	Gwangju, South Korea	2015 Summer Universiade
Universiade record	(South Korea) Ki Bo-bae	686	4 July 2015	Gwangju, South Korea	2015 Summer Universiade

Broken records

- 72 arrows ranking round

Category	Athlete	Record	Date	Place
World record	(South Korea) Choi Mi-sun	687	20 August 2017	Taipei, Taiwan
Universiade record	(South Korea) Choi Mi-sun	687	20 August 2017	Taipei, Taiwan

== Ranking round ==
Qualified for Round of 16
Qualified for 1/24 Round
Qualified for 1/48 Round

The ranking round took place on 20 August 2017 to determine the seeding for the elimination rounds. It consisted of two rounds of 36 arrows, with a maximum score of 720.

Rank	Archer	1st Half	2nd Half	10s	Xs	Score	Notes
1	Choi Mi-sun (KOR)	342	345	44	8	687	WR, UR
2	Lee Eung-yeong (KOR)	335	341	34	10	676	
3	Kang Chae-young (KOR)	330	340	31	9	670	
4	Peng Chia-mao (TPE)	338	328	36	16	666	
5	Tan Ya-ting (TPE)	328	331	23	11	659	
6	Sylwia Maria Zyzanska (POL)	327	325	25	9	652	
7	Alejandra Valencia (MEX)	330	319	24	9	649	
8	Lei Chien-ying (TPE)	323	325	27	7	648	
9	Tuiana Dashidorzhieva (RUS)	323	321	21	10	644	
10	Alexandra Longová (SVK)	320	323	23	6	643	
11	Audrey Adiceom (FRA)	312	329	21	5	641	
12	Claudia Mandia (ITA)	312	323	21	5	635	
13	Sayana Tsyrempilova (RUS)	316	318	15	4	634	
14	Monika Saren (IND)	316	317	15	6	633	
15	Daria Pavlichenko (UKR)	310	322	16	8	632	
16	Alexandra Mîrca (MDA)	319	311	16	5	630	
17	Elena Osipova (RUS)	311	318	19	4	629	
18	Joanna Rzasa (POL)	317	312	16	6	629	
19	Lidiia Sichenikova (UKR)	312	315	14	5	627	
20	Farida Tukebayeva (KAZ)	313	313	19	5	626	
21	Loredana Spera (ITA)	309	316	19	5	625	
22	Fumiyo Miyaji (JPN)	315	310	11	5	625	
23	Prachi Singh (IND)	316	309	6	1	625	
24	Christine Yeri Kim (USA)	311	310	17	9	621	
25	Wu Sze Yan (HKG)	312	307	13	7	619	
26	Manuela Mercuri (ITA)	311	307	13	4	618	
27	Ariel Riley Gibilaro (USA)	302	315	15	5	617	
28	Iryna Khochyna (UKR)	309	307	16	4	616	
29	Ezryn Meza Mohamed Hamzah (MAS)	308	307	14	4	615	
30	Rebeca Marquez Rodriguez (MEX)	299	313	14	6	612	
31	Nicole Ka'Imipo Turina (USA)	306	306	13	4	612	
32	Rina Sugibayashi (JPN)	301	310	8	3	611	
33	Valentine de Giuli (SUI)	304	304	14	4	608	
34	Darya Slobozhanina (KAZ)	300	307	13	5	607	
35	Clarie Hendrica Van Dijck (NED)	303	304	10	0	607	
36	Risa Horiguchi (JPN)	313	293	11	3	606	
37	Yoko Asuncion Guerrero Mitchell (MEX)	297	307	13	3	604	
38	Clemence Margau Tellier (FRA)	297	307	10	5	604	
39	Laxmi Devi (IND)	298	303	9	3	601	
40	Luiza Saidiyeva (KAZ)	305	295	12	4	600	
41	Azuanis Abdullah (MAS)	302	297	9	2	599	
42	Ummi Aisyah Mohd Fadzil (MAS)	292	301	8	0	593	
43	Risna Oktavia Hardanik (INA)	286	302	11	2	588	
44	Loren Chloe Balaoing (PHI)	293	291	13	1	584	
45	Jindřiška Vaněčková (CZE)	283	298	7	4	581	
46	Line Blomen Ridderstroem (NOR)	284	296	9	3	580	
47	Bessi Kasak (EST)	282	294	12	2	576	
48	Mesra Ayuni (INA)	288	283	8	3	571	
49	Shanaya Rose Dangla (PHI)	283	282	11	4	565	
50	Laura Nurmsalu (EST)	266	293	3	0	559	
51	Erika Maria Jangnas (SWE)	277	263	7	1	540	
52	Quah Kai Zhi (SGP)	262	276	3	1	538	
53	Wong Shi Ya Crystal (SGP)	267	268	6	1	535	
54	Chan Chermain Sze Wa (SGP)	261	270	6	1	531	
55	Magdaleba Smialkowska (POL)	210	280	7	3	490	
56	Cheryl Alexandr Loorents (SWE)	226	261	2	1	487	
57	Jasmina Büchel (LIE)	236	238	8	5	454	
58	Xena Hendra Chomapoy (PHI)	223	228	4	2	451	
59	Reena Pärnat (EST)	231	25	3	1	256	

== Elimination round ==
=== Section 1 ===
1/48 Round
1	Choi Mi-sun (KOR)
Bye
33	Valentine de Giuli (SUI)
Bye
Bye
32	Rina Sugibayashi (JPN)
17	Elena Osipova (RUS)
Bye
Bye
48	Mesra Ayuni (INA)
49	Shanaya Rose Dangla (PHI)
Bye
Bye
16	Alexandra Mîrca (MDA)

1/24 Round
1	Choi Mi-sun (KOR)
Bye
33	Valentine de Giuli (SUI)	6	27	25	30	28
32	Rina Sugibayashi (JPN)	2	25	28	29	26
17	Elena Osipova (RUS)	6	25	25	27	25
48	Mesra Ayuni (INA)	2	26	21	22	22
49	Shanaya Rose Dangla (PHI)	0	12	28	18
16	Alexandra Mîrca (MDA)'	6	27	29	27

Round of 32
1	Choi Mi-sun (KOR)	7	27	28	28	25	26
33	Valentine de Giuli (SUI)	3	27	20	21	28	23
17	Elena Osipova (RUS)	6	27	26	29	24	28
16	Alexandra Mîrca (MDA)	4	27	26	28	25	24

Round of 16
1	Choi Mi-sun (KOR)	4	26	28	25	25	26
17	Elena Osipova (RUS)	6	22	29	23	27	29

=== Section 2 ===
1/48 Round
9	Tuiana Dashidorzhieva (RUS)
Bye
57	Jasmina Büchel (LIE)	2	23	13	12	11
56	Cheryl Alexandr Loorents (SWE)	6	14	18	15	12
41	Azuanis Abdullah (MAS)
Bye
Bye
24	Christine Yeri Kim (USA)
25	Wu Sze Yan (HKG)
Bye
Bye
40	Luiza Saidiyeva (KAZ)
Bye
8	Lei Chien-ying (TPE)

1/24 Round
9	Tuiana Dashidorzhieva (RUS)	6	27	27	27
56	Cheryl Alexandr Loorents (SWE)	0	13	15	10
41	Azuanis Abdullah (MAS)	2	27	25	22	27
24	Christine Yeri Kim (USA)	6	26	26	27	26
25	Wu Sze Yan (HKG)	4	25	19	25	25	25
40	Luiza Saidiyeva (KAZ)	6	25	28	25	24	28
Bye
8	Lei Chien-ying (TPE)

Round of 32
9	Tuiana Dashidorzhieva (RUS)	6	25	27	21	24	28
24	Christine Yeri Kim (USA)	4	26	25	25	19	25
40	Luiza Saidiyeva (KAZ)	0	22	25	23
8	Lei Chien-ying (TPE)	6	28	27	28

Round of 16
9	Tuiana Dashidorzhieva (RUS)	5	24	28	28	23	26-7
8	Lei Chien-ying (TPE)	6	23	28	25	25	29-10

=== Section 3 ===
1/48 Round
5	Tan Ya-ting (TPE)
Bye
37	Yoko Asuncion Guerrero Mitchell (MEX)
Bye
Bye
28	Iryna Khochyna (UKR)
21	Loredana Spera (ITA)
Bye
Bye
44	Loren Chloe Balaoing (PHI)
53	Wong Shi Ya Crystal (SGP)
Bye
Bye
12	Claudia Mandia (ITA)

1/24 Round
5	Tan Ya-ting (TPE)
Bye
37	Yoko Asuncion Guerrero Mitchell (MEX)	5	20	24	27	25	24-9
28	Iryna Khochyna (UKR)	6	25	28	26	23	24-10
21	Loredana Spera (ITA)	6	22	27	25	28
44	Loren Chloe Balaoing (PHI)	2	28	25	23	23
53	Wong Shi Ya Crystal (SGP)	3	29	27	20	20	22
12	Claudia Mandia (ITA)	7	28	27	25	27	28

Round of 32
5	Tan Ya-ting (TPE)	6	26	26	29	26
28	Iryna Khochyna (UKR)	2	27	25	25	25
21	Loredana Spera (ITA)	0	26	24	23
12	Claudia Mandia (ITA)	6	29	27	24

Round of 16
5	Tan Ya-ting (TPE)	7	26	29	25	25
12	Claudia Mandia (ITA)	1	26	24	24	19

=== Section 4 ===
1/48 Round
13	Sayana Tsyrempilova (RUS)
Bye
Bye
52	Quah Kai Zhi (SGP)
45	Jindřiška Vaněčková (CZE)
Bye
Bye
20	Farida Tukebayeva (KAZ)
29	Ezryn Meza Mohamed Hamzah (MAS)
Bye
Bye
36	Risa Horiguchi (JPN)
Bye
4	Peng Chia-mao (TPE)

1/24 Round
13	Sayana Tsyrempilova (RUS)	6	28	28	29
52	Quah Kai Zhi (SGP)	0	24	25	26
45	Jindřiška Vaněčková (CZE)	0	22	24	24
20	Farida Tukebayeva (KAZ)	6	27	28	26
29	Ezryn Meza Mohamed Hamzah (MAS)	2	23	26	27	23
36	Risa Horiguchi (JPN)	6	29	27	26	28
Bye
4	Peng Chia-mao (TPE)

Round of 32
13	Sayana Tsyrempilova (RUS)	6	28	26	29
20	Farida Tukebayeva (KAZ)	0	25	23	28
36	Risa Horiguchi (JPN)	2	26	27	27	25
4	Peng Chia-mao (TPE)	6	29	28	26	26

Round of 16
13	Sayana Tsyrempilova (RUS)	0	27	24	24
4	Peng Chia-mao (TPE)	6	29	28	29

=== Section 5 ===
1/48 Round
3	Kang Chae-young (KOR)
Bye
35	Clarie Hendrica Van Dijck (NED)
Bye
Bye
30	Rebeca Marquez Rodriguez (MEX)
19	Lidiia Sichenikova (UKR)
Bye
Bye
46	Line Blomen Ridderstroem (NOR)
51	Erika Maria Jangnas (SWE)
Bye
Bye
14	Monika Saren (IND)

1/24 Round
3	Kang Chae-young (KOR)
Bye
35	Clarie Hendrica Van Dijck (NED)	0	22	23	24
30	Rebeca Marquez Rodriguez (MEX)	6	26	26	28
19	Lidiia Sichenikova (UKR)	6	28	26	25
46	Line Blomen Ridderstroem (NOR)	0	25	21	24
51	Erika Maria Jangnas (SWE)	0	21	22	23
14	Monika Saren (IND)	6	22	27	24

Round of 32
3	Kang Chae-young (KOR)	6	27	28	29
30	Rebeca Marquez Rodriguez (MEX)	0	26	25	23
19	Lidiia Sichenikova (UKR)	6	26	25	18	26
14	Monika Saren (IND)	2	22	22	23	25

Round of 16
3	Kang Chae-young (KOR)	6	29	29	26
19	Lidiia Sichenikova (UKR)	0	26	25	25

=== Section 6 ===
1/48 Round
11	Audrey Adiceom (FRA)
Bye
59	Reena Pärnat (EST)	6	28	17	27	22
54	Chan Chermain Sze Wa (SGP)	2	20	23	24	20
43	Risna Oktavia Hardanik (INA)
Bye
Bye
22	Fumiyo Miyaji (JPN)
27	Ariel Riley Gibilaro (USA)
Bye
Bye
38	Clemence Margau Tellier (FRA)
Bye
6	Sylwia Maria Zyzanska (POL)

1/24 Round
11	Audrey Adiceom (FRA)	6	28	28	29
59	Reena Pärnat (EST)	0	18	24	18
43	Risna Oktavia Hardanik (INA)	1	26	22	23	27
22	Fumiyo Miyaji (JPN)	7	26	24	28	28
27	Ariel Riley Gibilaro (USA)	6	28	24	27	27
38	Clemence Margau Tellier (FRA)	2	27	26	26	23
Bye
6	Sylwia Maria Zyzanska (POL)

Round of 32
11	Audrey Adiceom (FRA)	4	26	24	27	26	27
22	Fumiyo Miyaji (JPN)	6	23	29	28	25	28
27	Ariel Riley Gibilaro (USA)	0	25	22	18
6	Sylwia Maria Zyzanska (POL)	6	26	26	28

Round of 16
22	Fumiyo Miyaji (JPN)	7	28	28	26	25	24
6	Sylwia Maria Zyzanska (POL)	3	26	27	26	27	22

=== Section 7 ===
1/48 Round
7	Alejandra Valencia (MEX)
Bye
39	Laxmi Devi (IND)
Bye
Bye
26	Manuela Mercuri (ITA)
23	Prachi Singh (IND)
Bye
Bye
42	Ummi Aisyah Mohd Fadzil (MAS)
55	Magdaleba Smialkowska (POL)	2	14	14	24	10
58	Xena Hendra Chomapoy (PHI)	6	26	19	18	11
Bye
10	Alexandra Longová (SVK)

1/24 Round
7	Alejandra Valencia (MEX)
Bye
39	Laxmi Devi (IND)	2	24	23	25	22
26	Manuela Mercuri (ITA)	6	25	27	21	29
23	Prachi Singh (IND)	6	24	26	27	29
42	Ummi Aisyah Mohd Fadzil (MAS)	2	26	20	22	24
58	Xena Hendra Chomapoy (PHI)	4	27	28	18	19	10
10	Alexandra Longová (SVK)	6	26	26	28	23	26

Round of 16
7	Alejandra Valencia (MEX)	6	28	23	28	29
26	Manuela Mercuri (ITA)	2	25	24	23	20
23	Prachi Singh (IND)	6	26	25	28	27
10	Alexandra Longová (SVK)	2	26	24	26	27

Quarterfinals
7	Alejandra Valencia (MEX)	6	24	28	27	25
23	Prachi Singh (IND)	2	25	27	25	24

=== Section 8 ===
1/48 Round
15	Daria Pavlichenko (UKR)
Bye
Bye
50	Laura Nurmsalu (EST)
47	Bessi Kasak (EST)
Bye
Bye
18	Joanna Rzasa (POL)
31	Nicole Ka'Imipo Turina (USA)
Bye
Bye
34	Darya Slobozhanina (KAZ)
Bye
2	Lee Eung-yeong (KOR)

1/24 Round
15	Daria Pavlichenko (UKR)	6	27	24	19	28	26
50	Laura Nurmsalu (EST)	4	22	26	30	26	25
47	Bessi Kasak (EST)	0	27	26	25
18	Joanna Rzasa (POL)	6	28	30	26
31	Nicole Ka'Imipo Turina (USA)	6	25	23	24	26	27
34	Darya Slobozhanina (KAZ)	4	21	25	28	25	21
Bye
2	Lee Eung-yeong (KOR)

Round of 32
15	Daria Pavlichenko (UKR)	4	28	27	28	24	24
18	Joanna Rzasa (POL)	6	28	27	25	25	27
31	Nicole Ka'Imipo Turina (USA)	0	23	25	24
2	Lee Eung-yeong (KOR)	6	29	28	25

Round of 16
18	Joanna Rzasa (POL)	0	25	23	21
2	Lee Eung-yeong (KOR)	6	26	25	27

=== Finals ===
Quarterfinals
17	Elena Osipova (RUS)	2	26	27	27	26
8	Lei Chien-ying (TPE)	6	27	28	26	29
5	Tan Ya-ting (TPE)	7	29	30	27	28
4	Peng Chia-mao (TPE)	1	22	24	27	27
3	Kang Chae-young (KOR)	7	29	27	28	30	28
22	Fumiyo Miyaji (JPN)	3	27	29	28	28	25
7	Alejandra Valencia (MEX)	6*	30	29	29	26	24
2	Lee Eung-yeong (KOR)	5	30	27	28	29	28

Semifinals
8	Lei Chien-ying (TPE)	0	24	27	27
5	Tan Ya-ting (TPE)	6	27	28	28
3	Kang Chae-young (KOR)	7	29	27	29	28	28
7	Alejandra Valencia (MEX)	3	29	29	25	27	27

Final
5	Tan Ya-ting (TPE) (silver)	3	27	29	25	28	27
3	Kang Chae-young (KOR) (gold)	7	29	28	28	28	28
Bronze Medal
8	Lei Chien-ying (TPE)	0	27	26	27
7	Alejandra Valencia (MEX) (bronze)	6	28	28	28

Note: An asterisk (*) denotes a win from a one-arrow shoot-off
