= Archery at the 2017 Summer Universiade – Women's team recurve =

Women's team recurve at the XXIX Summer Universiade
- Venues: National Taiwan Sport University Stadium
- Dates: August 20, 2017 – August 24, 2017
- Competitors: 45 from 15 nations

Medalists
1st place, gold medalist(s)		Choi Mi-sun; Lee Eung-yeong; Kang Chae-young	South Korea
2nd place, silver medalist(s)		Peng Chia-mao; Tan Ya-ting; Lei Chien-ying	Chinese Taipei
3rd place, bronze medalist(s)		Tuiana Dashidorzhieva; Sayana Tsyrempilova; Elena Osipova	Russia

The women's team recurve archery competition at the 2017 Summer Universiade was held in the National Taiwan Sport University Stadium, Taipei, Taiwan between August 20–24, 2017.

== Records ==
Prior to the competition, the world and Universiade records were as follows.

- 216 arrows qualification round

Category	Team	Athlete	Score	Record	Date	Place	Event
World record	South Korea	Choi Mi-sun	686	2045	14 June 2016	Antalya, Turkey	2016 Archery World Cup
World record	South Korea	Ki Bo-bae	682	2045	14 June 2016	Antalya, Turkey	2016 Archery World Cup
World record	South Korea	Chang Hye-jin	677	2045	14 June 2016	Antalya, Turkey	2016 Archery World Cup
Universiade record	South Korea	Ki Bo-bae	686	2038	4 July 2015	Gwangju, South Korea	2015 Summer Universiade
Universiade record	South Korea	Kang Chae-young	679	2038	4 July 2015	Gwangju, South Korea	2015 Summer Universiade
Universiade record	South Korea	Choi Mi-sun	673	2038	4 July 2015	Gwangju, South Korea	2015 Summer Universiade

== Qualification round ==
Rank	Team	Archer	Individual			Team			Notes
Rank	Team	Archer	Score	10s	Xs	Total	10s	Xs	Notes
1	South Korea	Choi Mi-sun	687	44	8	2033	109	27	Q
1	South Korea	Lee Eung-yeong	676	34	10	2033	109	27	Q
1	South Korea	Kang Chae-young	670	31	9	2033	109	27	Q
2	Chinese Taipei	Peng Chia-mao	666	36	16	1973	86	34	Q
2	Chinese Taipei	Tan Ya-ting	659	23	11	1973	86	34	Q
2	Chinese Taipei	Lei Chien-ying	648	27	7	1973	86	34	Q
3	Russia	Tuiana Dashidorzhieva	644	21	10	1907	55	18	Q
3	Russia	Sayana Tsyrempilova	634	15	4	1907	55	18	Q
3	Russia	Elena Osipova	629	19	4	1907	55	18	Q
4	Italy	Claudia Mandia	635	21	5	1878	53	14	Q
4	Italy	Loredana Spera	625	19	5	1878	53	14	Q
4	Italy	Manuela Mercuri	618	13	4	1878	53	14	Q
5	Ukraine	Daria Pavlichenko	632	16	8	1875	46	17	Q
5	Ukraine	Lidiia Sichenikova	627	14	5	1875	46	17	Q
5	Ukraine	Iryna Khochyna	616	16	4	1875	46	17	Q
6	Mexico	Alejandra Valencia	649	24	9	1865	51	18	Q
6	Mexico	Rebeca Marquez Rodriguez	612	14	6	1865	51	18	Q
6	Mexico	Yoko Asuncion Guerrero Mitchell	604	13	3	1865	51	18	Q
7	India	Monika Saren	633	15	6	1859	30	10	Q
7	India	Prachi Singh	625	6	1	1859	30	10	Q
7	India	Laxmi Devi	601	9	3	1859	30	10	Q
8	United States	Christine Yeri Kim	621	17	9	1850	45	18	Q
8	United States	Ariel Riley Gibilaro	617	15	5	1850	45	18	Q
8	United States	Nicole Ka'Imipo Turina	612	13	4	1850	45	18	Q
9	Japan	Fumiyo Miyaji	625	11	5	1842	30	11	Q
9	Japan	Rina Sugibayashi	611	8	3	1842	30	11	Q
9	Japan	Risa Horiguchi	606	11	3	1842	30	11	Q
10	Kazakhstan	Farida Tukebayeva	626	19	5	1833	44	14	Q
10	Kazakhstan	Darya Slobozhanina	607	13	5	1833	44	14	Q
10	Kazakhstan	Luiza Saidiyeva	600	12	4	1833	44	14	Q
11	Malaysia	Ezryn Meza Mohamed Hamzah	615	14	4	1807	31	6	Q
11	Malaysia	Azuanis Abdullah	599	9	2	1807	31	6	Q
11	Malaysia	Ummi Aisyah Mohd Fadzil	593	8	0	1807	31	6	Q
12	Poland	Sylwia Maria Zyzanska	652	25	9	1771	48	18	Q
12	Poland	Joanna Rzasa	629	16	6	1771	48	18	Q
12	Poland	Magdaleba Smialkowska	490	7	3	1771	48	18	Q
13	Singapore	Quah Kai Zhi	538	3	1	1604	15	3	Q
13	Singapore	Wong Shi Ya Crystal	535	6	1	1604	15	3	Q
13	Singapore	Chan Chermain Sze Wa	531	6	1	1604	15	3	Q
14	Philippines	Loren Chloe Balaoing	584	13	1	1600	28	7	Q
14	Philippines	Shanaya Rose Dangla	565	11	4	1600	28	7	Q
14	Philippines	Xena Hendra Chomapoy	451	4	2	1600	28	7	Q
15	Estonia	Bessi Kasak	576	12	2	1391	18	3	Q
15	Estonia	Laura Nurmsalu	559	3	0	1391	18	3	Q
15	Estonia	Reena Pärnat	256	3	1	1391	18	3	Q

== Elimination rounds ==
Round of 16
9	Japan	4	46	43	51	52	20
8	United States	5	49	44	47	46	21
5	Ukraine	6	52	44	50
12	Poland	0	35	35	42
13	Singapore	2	29	30	42	39
4	Italy	6	43	39	41	48
3	Russia	6	49	46	50
14	Philippines	0	40	38	43
11	Malaysia	2	53	44	45	51
6	Mexico	6	46	50	47	52
7	India	5	45	39	39	50	24
10	Kazakhstan	4	39	41	42	45	14
15	Estonia	0	42	42	39
2	Chinese Taipei	6	52	48	53

Quarterfinals
1	South Korea	5	53	51	53
8	United States	1	47	51	51
5	Ukraine	4	49	45	52	50	16
4	Italy	5	47	51	50	52	25
3	Russia	6	53	46	53
6	Mexico	0	46	43	48
7	India	0	42	49	48
2	Chinese Taipei	6	53	54	54

Semifinals
1	South Korea	5	50	53	54
4	Italy	1	44	53	35
3	Russia	2	48	49	53	46
2	Chinese Taipei	6	52	53	51	52

Final
1	South Korea	5	53	58	57	58	30
2	Chinese Taipei	4	56	56	54	59	28
Third place
4	Italy	0	49	49	53
3	Russia	6	51	54	56
