= Archery at the 2015 European Games – Women's team =

Women's team at the 2015 European Games
- Venue: Tofiq Bahramov Stadium
- Date: 16–18 June
- Competitors: 48 from 16 nations

Medalists
gold medal	Natalia Valeeva; Guendalina Sartori; Elena Tonetta	Italy
silver medal	Hanna Marusava; Ekaterina Timofeyeva; Alena Tolkach	Belarus
bronze medal	Lidiia Sichenikova; Veronika Marchenko; Anastasia Pavlova	Ukraine

The women's team archery event at the 2015 European Games in Baku took place between 16 and 18 June.

== Ranking round ==
The ranking round took place on 16 June 2015 to determine the seeding for the knockout rounds. 16 countries entered a full team complement of three archers, so all qualified for the knockout round. World rankings shown are correct at tournament start date.

Rank	Team	Archers	Score	WR
1	Germany	Lisa Unruh; Karina Winter; Elena Richter	1952	4
2	Russia	Kristina Timofeeva; Inna Stepanova; Natalia Erdyniyeva	1944	8
3	Italy	Natalia Valeeva; Guendalina Sartori; Elena Tonetta	1938	15
4	Ukraine	Lidiia Sichenikova; Veronika Marchenko; Anastasia Pavlova	1917	17
5	Georgia	Khatuna Narimanidze; Kristine Esebua; Yuliya Lobzhenidze	1916	11
6	Denmark	Maja Jager; Carina Rosenvinge; Natasja Bech	1907	9
7	France	Laura Ruggieri; Bérengère Schuh; Solenne Thomas	1898	10
8	Spain	Alicia Marin; Adriana Martín; Miriam Alarcón	1888	20
9	Belarus	Hanna Marusava; Ekaterina Timofeyeva; Alena Tolkach	1887	13
10	Turkey	Yasemin Anagöz; Aybüke Aktuna; Begünhan Elif Ünsal	1886	23
11	Poland	Wioleta Myszor; Adriana Żurańska; Natalia Leśniak	1883	14
12	Great Britain	Naomi Folkard; Nicky Hunt` Amy Oliver	1858	16
13	Netherlands	Shireen-Zoë de Vries; Esther Deden; Annemarie der Kinderen	1853	29
14	Greece	Evangelina Psarra; Ariadni Chorti; Anatoli Martha Gkorila	1846	30
15	Switzerland	Céline Schobinger; Iliana Deineko; Nathalie Dielen	1822	54
16	Azerbaijan	Olqa Senyuk; Nurlana Velieva; Yaylagul Ramazanova	1795	33

== Elimination rounds ==
First Round
1	Germany (GER)	2	2	2
16	Azerbaijan (AZE)	0	0	0
9	Belarus (BLR)	2	1	0	2
8	Spain (ESP)	0	1	2	0
5	Georgia (GEO)	1	0	2	2
12	Great Britain (GBR)	1	2	0	0
13	Netherlands (NED)	0	1	2	0
4	Ukraine (UKR)	2	1	0	2
3	Italy (ITA)	0	2	2	2
14	Greece (GRE)	2	0	0	0
11	Poland (POL)	0	0	2	2	0
6	Denmark (DEN)	2	2	0	0	1
7	France (FRA)	2	2	0	2
10	Turkey (TUR)	0	0	2	0
15	Switzerland (SUI)	0	0	2	0
2	Russia (RUS)	2	2	0	2

Quarterfinals
1	Germany (GER)	2	0	0	0
9	Belarus (BLR)	0	2	2	2
5	Georgia (GEO)	2	1	1	0	0
4	Ukraine (UKR)	0	1	1	2	1
3	Italy (ITA)	0	2	2	0	1
6	Denmark (DEN)	2	0	0	2	0
7	France (FRA)	0	2	0	1
2	Russia (RUS)	2	0	2	1

Semifinals
9	Belarus (BLR)	2	1	0	2
4	Ukraine (UKR)	0	1	2	0
3	Italy (ITA)	2	1	0	2
2	Russia (RUS)	0	1	2	0

Final
9	Belarus (BLR)	0	2	1	0
3	Italy (ITA)	2	0	1	2
Third place
4	Ukraine (UKR)	0	0	2	2	1
2	Russia (RUS)	2	2	0	0	0
