= 2014 World Indoor Archery Championships =

International archery competition

2014 World Indoor Target Archery Championships
- Location: Nîmes, France
- Start date: 2014-02-26
- End date: 2014-03-02
- Competitors: 353 from 45 nations

The 2014 World Indoor Target Archery Championships was the 12th edition of the World Indoor Archery Championships. The event was held in Nîmes, France, from February 26 to March 2, 2014, and was organized by World Archery.

== Medal table ==
Rank	Nation	Gold	Silver	Bronze	Total
1	Ukraine	3	3	1	7
2	Italy	3	1	1	5
3	United States	2	5	3	10
4	France	2	0	1	3
5	Mexico	2	0	0	2
6	Germany	1	2	0	3
7	Turkey	1	0	1	2
8	Australia	1	0	0	1
8	Hungary	1	0	0	1
10	Japan	0	2	0	2
11	Russia	0	1	2	3
12	Croatia	0	1	1	2
12	Denmark	0	1	1	2
14	Poland	0	0	2	2
15	Netherlands	0	0	1	1
15	South Africa	0	0	1	1
15	Sweden	0	0	1	1
Totals (17 entries)		16	16	16	48

== Events ==
=== Recurve ===
==== Senior ====
Event	Gold	Silver	Bronze
Men's individual	Ryan Tyack; Australia	Viktor Ruban; Ukraine	Brady Ellison; United States
Men's team	Ukraine; Heorhiy Ivanytskyy; Markiyan Ivashko; Viktor Ruban	Japan; Hideki Kikuchi; Naoya Oniyama; Shungo Tabata	Netherlands; Sjef van den Berg; Rick van den Oever; Rick van der Ven
Women's individual	Aida Roman; Mexico	Miki Nakamura; Japan	Anastasia Pavlova; Ukraine
Women's team	Ukraine; Veronika Marchenko; Anastasia Pavlova; Lidiia Sichenikova	Germany; Veronika Haidn Tschalova; Elena Richter; Karina Winter	Poland; Natalia Leśniak; Karina Lipiarska; Adriana Żurańska

==== Junior ====
Event	Gold	Silver	Bronze
Men's individual	Maximilian Weckmueller; Germany	Carlo Schmitz; Germany	David Pasqualucci; Italy
Men's team	France; Thomas Antoine; Lucas Daniel; Thomas Koenig	Ukraine; Anton Komar; Valentyn Kutsyy; Mykhaylo-Yaroslav Malyk	Turkey; Berat Aydın; Kerem Kırsever; Orkun Ege Tokuşoglu
Women's individual	Tatiana Andreoli; Italy	Ariuna Zhargalova; Russia	Sylwia Zyzanska; Poland
Women's team	Italy; Tatiana Andreoli; Sara Ret; Loredana Spera	Ukraine; Solomiya Gnyp; Viktoria Oleksiyk; Polina Rodionova	Russia; Zhibzema Dambaeva; Valeria Mylnikova; Ariuna Zhargalova

=== Compound ===
==== Senior ====
Event	Gold	Silver	Bronze
Men's individual	Sergio Pagni; Italy	Reo Wilde; United States	Stephan Hansen; Denmark
Men's team	United States; Jesse Broadwater; Braden Gellenthien; Reo Wilde	Denmark; Martin Damsbo; Stephan Hansen; Patrick Laursen	Sweden; Magnus Carlsson; Carl-Henrik Gidenskold; Morgan Lundin
Women's individual	Sophie Dodemont; France	Christie Colin; United States	Pascale Lebecque; France
Women's team	Mexico; Rosalia Dominguez; Brenda Merino; Linda Ochoa	United States; Christie Colin; Crystal Gauvin; Erika Jones	South Africa; Gerda Roux; Jeanine van Kradenburg; Danelle Wentzel

==== Junior ====
Event	Gold	Silver	Bronze
Men's individual	Viktor Orosz; Hungary	Mario Vavro; Croatia	Bridger Deaton; United States
Men's team	United States; Bridger Deaton; Dillon McGeorge; Charlie Weinstein	Italy; Valerio Della Stua; Michele Nencioni; Jesse Sut	Croatia; Domagoj Buden; Andelo Suvak; Mario Vavro
Women's individual	Mariya Shkolna; Ukraine	Emily Bee; United States	Lexi Keller; United States
Women's team	Turkey; Aleyna Akçınar; Yeşim Bostan; Begüm Topkarcı	United States; Emily Bee; Lexi Keller; Brogan Williams	Russia; Sofia Khlystova; Alexandra Savenkova; Maria Vinogradova

== Participating nations ==
45 nations registered 353 athletes across disciplines, significantly more than in Las Vegas in 2012.

- Argentina (1)
- Armenia (1)
- Australia (3)
- Austria (4)
- Belgium (11)
- Belarus (13)
- Brazil (2)
- Canada (7)
- Croatia (8)
- Czech Republic (3)
- Denmark (6)
- Ecuador (1)
- Estonia (3)
- Finland (8)
- France (22)
- Georgia (5)
- Germany (12)
- Great Britain (8)
- Greece (12)
- Hong Kong (1)
- Hungary (3)
- Iceland (5)
- Ireland (2)
- Italy (21)
- Ivory Coast (1)
- Japan (8)
- Latvia (2)
- Liechtenstein (1)
- Lithuania (3)
- Mexico (14)
- Moldova (4)
- Netherlands (8)
- Norway (5)
- Poland (13)
- Russia (24)
- Slovenia (12)
- Slovakia (5)
- South Africa (9)
- Spain (1)
- Sweden (11)
- Switzerland (8)
- Turkey (12)
- Ukraine (24)
- United States (24)
- Uzbekistan (3)
