= 2017 European Indoor Archery Championships =

- Location: Vittel, France
- Start date: 7 March
- End date: 12 March
- Competitors: 237 from 27 nations

The 2017 Archery European Indoor Championships was the 16th edition of the European Indoor Archery Championships which was held in Vittel, France between 7–12 March 2017.

== Medal table ==
* Host nation (France)

Rank	Nation	Gold	Silver	Bronze	Total
1	Italy	6	2	2	10
2	Denmark	2	0	1	3
3	Poland	2	0	0	2
4	Russia	1	4	6	11
5	France*	1	4	3	8
6	Ukraine	1	1	1	3
7	Turkey	1	0	1	2
8	Austria	1	0	0	1
8	Estonia	1	0	0	1
10	Netherlands	0	2	0	2
11	Great Britain	0	1	2	3
12	Belgium	0	1	0	1
12	Moldova	0	1	0	1
Totals (13 entries)		16	16	16	48

== Senior Results ==
=== Men ===
Event	Gold	Silver	Bronze
Recurve individual	David Pasqualucci; Italy	Dan Olaru; Moldova	Jean-Charles Valladont; France
Recurve team	Italy; Marco Galiazzo; Massimiliano Mandia; David Pasqualucci	France; Florent Mulot; Olivier Tavernier; Jean-Charles Valladont	Russia; Galsan Bazarzhapov; Artiom Majnenko; Bair Tsybekdorzhiyev
Compound individual	Jacopo Polidori; Italy	Mike Schloesser; Netherlands	Stephan Hansen; Denmark
Compound team	Italy; Michele Nencioni; Sergio Pagni; Jacopo Polidori	Netherlands; Peter Elzinga; Mike Schloesser; Pim van de Ven	Russia; Anton Bulayev; Alexandr Dambayev; Viktor Kalashnikov

=== Women ===
Event	Gold	Silver	Bronze
Recurve individual	Veronika Marchenko; Ukraine	Yevgueniya Timofeyeva; Russia	Angéline Cohendet; France
Recurve Team	Poland; Karolina Farasiewicz; Natalia Leśniak; Wioleta Myszor	France; Audrey Adiceom; Tiffanie Banckaert; Angéline Cohendet	Ukraine; Veronika Marchenko; Anastasia Pavlova; Lidiia Sichenikova
Compound individual	Alexandra Savenkova; Russia	Sarah Prieels; Belgium	Marcella Tonioli; Italy
Compound Team	Denmark; Erika Anear; Tanja Jensen; Sarah Sonnichsen	Italy; Irene Franchini; Laura Longo; Marcella Tonioli	Russia; Natalia Avdeyeva; Alexandra Savenkova; Mariya Vinogradova

== Junior Results ==
Event	Gold	Silver	Bronze
Recurve Junior Men	Erdal Meriç Dal; Turkey	Thomas Chirault; France	Thomas Koenig; France
Recurve Junior Men Team	France; Thomas Chirault; Thomas Koenig; Valentin Ripaux	Ukraine; Anton Komar; Mykyta Kravchuk; Serhii Rozkydnyi	Russia; Stanislav Cheremiskin; Bulat Dugarov; Erdem Tsydypov
Compound Junior Men	Nico Wiener; Austria	Nicolas Girard; France	Göksel Altıntaş; Turkey
Compound Junior Men Team	Denmark; Christoffer Berg; Simon Olsen; Sune Rasmussen	Italy; Manuel Festi; Viviano Mior; Jesse Sut	Russia; Roman Efimov; Evgeny Sokol; Dmitriy Stepanov
Recurve Junior Women	Tatiana Andreoli; Italy	Bryony Pitman; Great Britain	Viktoria Kharitonova; Russia
Recurve Junior Women Team	Italy; Tatiana Andreoli; Tanya Giaccheri; Vanessa Landi	Russia; Tuiana Budazhapova; Viktoria Kharitonova; Tatiana Plotnikova	United Kingdom; Bryony Pitman; Alyssia Tromans-Ansell; Elizabeth Warner
Compound Junior Women	Mariya Shkolna; Poland	Bairma Aiurzanaeva; Russia	Layla Annison; Great Britain
Compound Junior Women Team	Estonia; Emily Hoim; Lisell Jäätma; Meeri-Marita Paas	Russia; Bairma Aiurzanaeva; Elizaveta Knyazeva; Elizaveta Koroleva	Italy; Camilla Alberti; Erica Benzini; Elisa Roner

== Participating nations ==
237 archers from 27 countries:

1. Austria (9)
2. Azerbaijan (2)
3. Belgium (2)
4. Bulgaria (3)
5. Croatia (7)
6. Czech Republic (2)
7. Denmark (14)
8. Spain (4)
9. Estonia (10)
10. Finland (3)
11. France (20) (Host)
12. United Kingdom (17)
13. Georgia (12)
14. Germany (6)
15. Hungary (1)
16. Italy (22)
17. Moldova (6)
18. Netherlands (7)
19. Poland (12)
20. Romania (2)
21. Russia (24)
22. Slovenia (5)
23. Serbia (3)
24. Switzerland (5)
25. Sweden (5)
26. Turkey (22)
27. Ukraine (12)
