= Miroslava Dagbaeva =

Mongolian archer (born 1987)

Miroslava Danzandorj
Personal information
- Born: 14 August 1987 (age 38)

Sport
- Country: Mongolia
- Sport: Archery
- Event: recurve
- Updated on 10 September 2015

Danzandorjiin Miroslava born Miroslava Dagbaeva (born 14 August 1987) is a Buryat Mongol athlete from Mongolia who competes in archery (since 2013).

== Career ==
=== 2008 Summer Olympics ===
She represented Russia at the 2008 Summer Olympics. At the 2008 Summer Olympics in Beijing Miroslava finished her ranking round with a total of 637 points. This gave her the 23rd seed for the final competition bracket in which she faced Rina Dewi Puspitasari in the first round. Both archers scored 106 points in the regular match and had to go to a decisive extra round to make the difference. Miroslava scored 10 points in the extra round, while Puspitasari scored 9 points. In the second round Miroslava was unable to win against 10th seed Ana Rendón and lost the game with 110–106.

=== Other ===
She competed in the individual recurve event and the team recurve event at the 2015 World Archery Championships in Copenhagen, Denmark.
