= Alicia Marín =

Spanish archer (born 1997)

Personal information
- Full name: Alicia Marín Martínez
- Born: 17 April 1997 (age 29)

Sport
- Country: Spain
- Sport: Archery
- Event: recurve
Medal record
Women's archery
Representing Spain
European Games
Bronze medal – third place	2015 Baku	Individual
Mediterranean Games
Silver medal – second place	2018 Tarragona	Team
- Updated on 30 November 2019

Alicia Marín Martínez (born 17 April 1997 in Madrid) is a Spanish recurve archer.

She has competed for Spain at the Summer Youth Olympics, World Archery Championships, the Archery World Cup, and the European Games, winning a bronze medal in the latter in 2015.

== Career ==
=== 2014-2016 ===
Marín competed in her first senior tournament in 2014 at the European Outdoor Championships in Armenia, defeating Russia's Inna Stepanova in the bronze medal match to earn her maiden senior archery medal.

In 2015 Marín was selected to compete in three events at the inaugural European Games held in Baku in June. She won a bronze medal in the women's individual competition, reaching the semi-finals after finishing the 72-arrow round in nineteenth place. A loss to Denmark's Maja Jager in the semi-finals relegated her to the bronze medal match, where she defeated Evangelia Psarra of Greece to claim the final position on the podium. Marín's participation in her two other events however proved less successful. The women's team event saw Marín and her teammates Adriana Martín and Miriam Alarcón eliminated in the first round to Belarus, while the progress of her partnership with Miguel Alvarino Garcia in the mixed team competition event stalled at the quarter-finals with a loss to Georgia. The World Archery Championships held in Copenhagen in July also brought little success, with Marín suffering an opening round defeat in the individual competition after failing to resist a comeback from Japan's Yuki Hayashi.

Marín began 2016 with successes on the national stage, breaking the Spanish record for a 30-arrow round and the European record for the 18-metre round at the Spanish Archery Championships in Torremolinos in February. She however narrowly missed out on qualifying for the 2016 Summer Olympics held later in the year. One of two Spaniards to reach the quarter-finals of the final Olympic qualification tournament, which allocated the final six positions available for the women's individual event, she was defeated by Alexandra Mîrca of Moldova in straight sets. The single position open to Spain went to Adriana Martín, who traveled to Rio de Janeiro as the sole female Spanish archer.

=== 2017-2019 ===
Marín started the 2017 season strongly, winning her first Archery World Cup medal at the tournament's second stage in Antalya. Alongside Pablo Acha she defeated the United States in the mixed team event's third-place match to win bronze medal, a result that Marín admitted was "not the goal but it happened, so we were definitely more than happy with it". She followed her medal with a fourth-placed finish in the women's individual event at the third stage hosted in Salt Lake City, defeating 2012 Olympic medalist Aída Román before losing to 2016 Olympic medalists Tan Ya-ting in the semi-finals and Choi Mi-sun in the bronze medal match. Her performances allowed her to qualify for her maiden Archery World Cup final in Rome, where she was defeated by Russia's Ksenia Perova, the world number two, in the quarter-finals.

The 2018 Mediterranean Games in Tarragona was a successful tournament for Spain's team of archers, with each member achieving a medal result. Marín earned a silver medal in the women's team event with Mónica Galisteo and Nerea López, the trio losing to France in the final.

One year later, Marín suffered another first round defeat at the World Archery Championships' women's individual event in June, losing to Elizabeth Bidaure of the Philippines. She fared little better in the women's team event, the trio of Marín, Elia Canales, and Mónica Galisteo defeating Vietnam in the opening round but faced what Marca called the "theoretically unbeatable" South Korea in the second round. Later that month at the 2019 European Games in Minsk, Marín finished thirteenth in the ranking round and was paired with Denmark's Maja Jager in her first elimination match. In a repeat of their semi-final at the 2015 European Games, Jager proved stronger and defeated Marín by six set points to four, Marín failing to maintain her performance from the ranking round.
