= 2016 European Archery Championships =

- Location: United Kingdom, Nottingham
- Start date: 23 May
- End date: 29 May

The 2016 European Archery Championships is the 24th edition of the European Archery Championships. The event was held in Nottingham, United Kingdom from May 23 to 29, 2016.

== Medal summary ==
=== Recurve ===
Event	Gold	Silver	Bronze
Men's individual	Jean-Charles Valladont; France	Mete Gazoz; Turkey	Patrick Huston; United Kingdom
Women's individual	Veronika Marchenko; Ukraine	Tuyana Dashidorzhiyeva; Russia	Lisa Unruh; Germany
Men's team	Arsalan Baldanov; Alexandr Kozhin; Vitaly Popov; Russia	Laurence Godfrey; Patrick Huston; Kieran Slater; United Kingdom	Robin Ramaekers; Ben Adriaensen; Nico Thiry; Belgium
Women's team	Anastasia Pavlova; Veronika Marchenko; Lidiia Sichenikova; Ukraine	Kristine Esebua; Yulia Lobzhenidze; Jatuna Narimanidze; Georgia	Elena Richter; Lisa Unruh; Veronika Haidn Tschalova; Germany
Mixed Team	Alexandra Mîrca; Dan Olaru; Moldova	Bérengère Schuh; Jean-Charles Valladont; France	Anastasia Pavlova; Viktor Ruban; Ukraine

=== Compound ===
Event	Gold	Silver	Bronze
Men's individual	Stephan Hansen; Denmark	Peter Elzinga; Netherlands	Dominique Genet; France
Women's individual	Sarah Prieels; Belgium	Alexandra Savenkova; Russia	Mariya Vinogradova; Russia
Men's team	Stephan Hansen; Andreas Darum; Martin Damsbo; Denmark	Anton Bulayev; Alexandr Dambayev; Viktor Kalashnikov; Russia	Dominique Genet; Jean-Philippe Boulch; Sébastien Peineau; France
Women's team	Yeşim Bostan; Ayşe Bera Süzer; Evrim Sağlam; Turkey	Mariya Vinogradova; Albina Loguinova; Alexandra Savenkova; Russia	Martine Couwenberg; Inge van Caspel; Irina Markovic; Netherlands
Mixed Team	Marcella Tonioli; Federico Pagnoni; Italy	Toja Ellison; Dejan Sitar; Slovenia	Andrea Marcos; Alberto Blázquez; Spain

== Medal table ==
Rank	Nation	Gold	Silver	Bronze	Total
1	Ukraine	2	0	1	3
2	Denmark	2	0	0	2
3	Russia	1	4	1	6
4	France	1	1	2	4
5	Turkey	1	1	0	2
6	Belgium	1	0	1	2
7	Italy	1	0	0	1
7	Moldova	1	0	0	1
9	Great Britain	0	1	1	2
9	Netherlands	0	1	1	2
11	Georgia	0	1	0	1
11	Slovenia	0	1	0	1
13	Germany	0	0	2	2
14	Spain	0	0	1	1
Totals (14 entries)		10	10	10	30
