= Sarah Prieels =

Belgian archer (born 1990)

Personal information
- Born: 27 February 1990 (age 36)

Sport
- Country: Belgium
- Sport: Archery
- Event: Compound

Achievements and titles
- Personal best: 597(WR)
Medal record
Women's compound archery
Representing Belgium
European Championships
Gold medal – first place	2021 Antalya	Mixed team
Gold medal – first place	2016 Nottingham	Individual
Gold medal – first place	2010 Rovereto	Team
World Indoor Archery Championships
Bronze medal – third place	2016 Ankara	Individual
European Indoor Championships
Gold medal – first place	2015 Koper	Individual
Silver medal – second place	2017 Vittel	Individual
World University Archery Championship
Silver medal – second place	2016 Ulaanbaatar	Individual
Summer Universiade
Bronze medal – third place	2015 Gwangju	Mixed team
Archery World Cup
Gold medal – first place	2014 Antalya	Mixed team
Silver medal – second place	2019 Shanghai	Mixed team
Bronze medal – third place	2013 Medellín	Mixed team
Bronze medal – third place	2017 Shanghai	Individual
Bronze medal – third place	2023 Medellín	Individual

Sarah Prieels (born 27 February 1990) is a Belgian archer competing the women's compound events. She won the gold medal in the mixed team event at the 2021 European Archery Championships held in Antalya, Turkey.

In June 2019, Prieels competed in the women's individual compound event at the European Games held in Minsk, Belarus. In December 2019, she set a new world record for the women's 60-arrow 18-metre indoor ranking round with a total of 597 out of 600 points at the TRUBall/Axcel Roma Archery Trophy held in Rome, Italy.

Prieels competed at the 2022 European Indoor Archery Championships held in Laško, Slovenia. She represented Belgium at the 2022 World Games held in Birmingham, United States. She also competed at the 2023 European Games held in Poland.

== Family ==
She is the great-great-granddaughter of archer Hubert Van Innis, multiple Olympic champion.
