= Kang Un-ju =

North Korean archer (born 1995)

Personal information
- Born: 1 February 1995 (age 31)
- Height: 168 cm (5 ft 6 in)
- Weight: 60 kg (132 lb)

Korean name
- Hangul: 강은주
- RR: Gang Eunju
- MR: Kang Ŭnju

Sport
- Country: North Korea
- Sport: Archery
- Event: recurve
Medal record
Women's archery
Representing North Korea
Asian Games
Silver medal – second place	2018 Jakarta	Mixed team
- Updated on 10 September 2015

Kang Un-ju (Korean: 강은주; Korean pronunciation: [kaŋ.ɯn.dzu]; born 1 February 1995) is a North Korean recurve archer.

Kang made her debut in international competition at the 2013 Archery World Cup qualifying round in Shanghai, China, and later that year joined the 2013 World Archery Championships in Antalya, Turkey. She also participated in archery at the 2014 Asian Games. The following year she competed in the individual recurve event and the team recurve event at the 2015 World Archery Championships in Copenhagen, Denmark.

Kang, a resident of Pyongyang, is right-handed.

== See also ==
- Kwon Un-sil – 2012 North Korean Olympic archer
- Sport in North Korea
