= Esther Deden =

Dutch archer (born 1994)

Personal information
- Born: 1 July 1994 (age 32)

Sport
- Country: Netherlands
- Sport: Archery
- Event: recurve
- Updated on 10 September 2015

Esther Deden (born 1 July 1994) is a Dutch recurve archer.

Deden represented the Netherlands at the 2015 European Games in the individual event and team event in Baku, Azerbaijan. She also competed in the individual recurve event, team recurve event and mixed team recurve event at the 2015 World Archery Championships in Copenhagen, Denmark.
