= Anastasia Pavlova =

Ukrainian archer (born 1995)

Anastasiia Pavlova
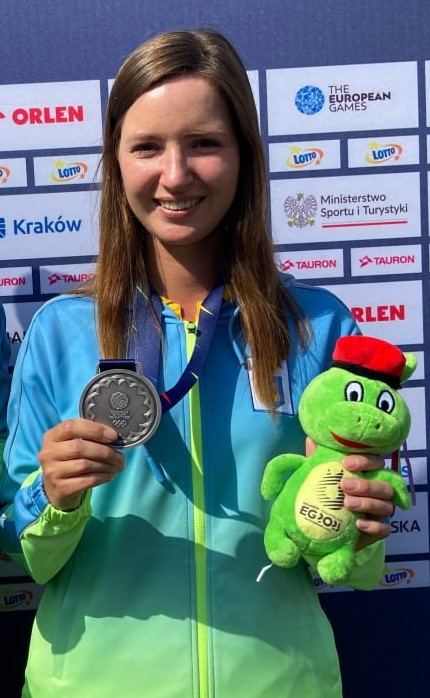
- Pavlova at the 2023 European Games

Personal information
- Full name: Anastasiia Vladyslavivna; Pavlova
- Nickname: Nastya
- Born: 9 February 1995 (age 31) Nova Kakhovka, Ukraine
- Height: 1.72 m (5 ft 8 in)
- Weight: 53 kg (117 lb)

Sport
- Country: Ukraine
- Sport: Archery
- Event: Recurve
Medal record
Women's archery
Representing Ukraine
World Indoor Championships
Gold medal – first place	2014 Nîmes	Team
Bronze medal – third place	2014 Nîmes	Individual
Bronze medal – third place	2018 Yankton	Team
European Games
Silver medal – second place	2023 Kraków	Mixed team
Bronze medal – third place	2015 Baku	Team
European Archery Championships
Gold medal – first place	2016 Nottingham	Team
Bronze medal – third place	2016 Nottingham	Mixed team
European Indoor Championships
Gold medal – first place	2022 Laško	Team
Gold medal – first place	2024 Varaždin	Team
Silver medal – second place	2024 Varaždin	Individual
Bronze medal – third place	2017 Vittel	Team
Bronze medal – third place	2019 Samsun	Team
Bronze medal – third place	2022 Laško	Individual
Bronze medal – third place	2026 Plovdiv	Team
World Junior Indoor Championships
Gold medal – first place	2012 Las Vegas	Team
Silver medal – second place	2012 Las Vegas	Individual
World Youth Championships
Gold medal – first place	2013 Wuxi	Team

Anastasiia Vladyslavivna Pavlova (Ukrainian: Анастасі́я Владисла́вівна Па́влова; born 9 February 1995) is a Ukrainian competitive archer. She has collected a career total of at least ten medals in major international competitions, spanning the World Indoor Championships, the European Games, the World Cup series, and the European Championships.

== Career ==
Pavlova rose to prominence on the global archery scene at the 2014 World Indoor Championships in Nimes, France. There, she and her compatriots Lidiia Sichenikova and Veronika Marchenko powered past the German women (234–220) on a tactical 14-point advantage to capture the team recurve title (234–220). Pavlova also added the bronze to the trio's career treasury by ousting the neighboring Russia in a high-quality 5–4 shoot-off at the 2015 European Games in Baku, Azerbaijan.

Pavlova was selected to compete for the Ukrainian squad at the 2016 Summer Olympics in Rio de Janeiro, shooting in both individual and team recurve tournaments. Two months before her maiden Games, she helped her Ukrainian colleagues overcome the Estonian side from the semi-final match for one of three women's team spaces at the World Archery Cup meet in Antalya, Turkey. Pavlova opened the tournament by discharging a total of 630 points, 18 perfect tens, and 6 bull's eyes to lead the Ukrainian women for the twenty-ninth seed heading to the knockout draw from the classification round, along with the trio's cumulative score of 1,890. Sitting at eighth in the women's team recurve, Pavlova, along with Marchenko and Sichenikova, slipped out of their initial round match to a convincing 2–6 defeat from the ninth-seeded Japanese women. In the women's individual recurve, Pavlova successfully blanked Kazakhstan's Luiza Saidiyeva for a comfortable 6–0 victory in the opening round, before losing her subsequent match by a similar scoreline to the Taiwanese archer and team bronze medalist Tan Ya-ting.

She won the bronze medal in the women's recurve event at the 2022 European Indoor Archery Championships held in Laško, Slovenia. She also won the gold medal in the women's team recurve event.
