= Elena Osipova (archer) =

Russian archer (born 1993)

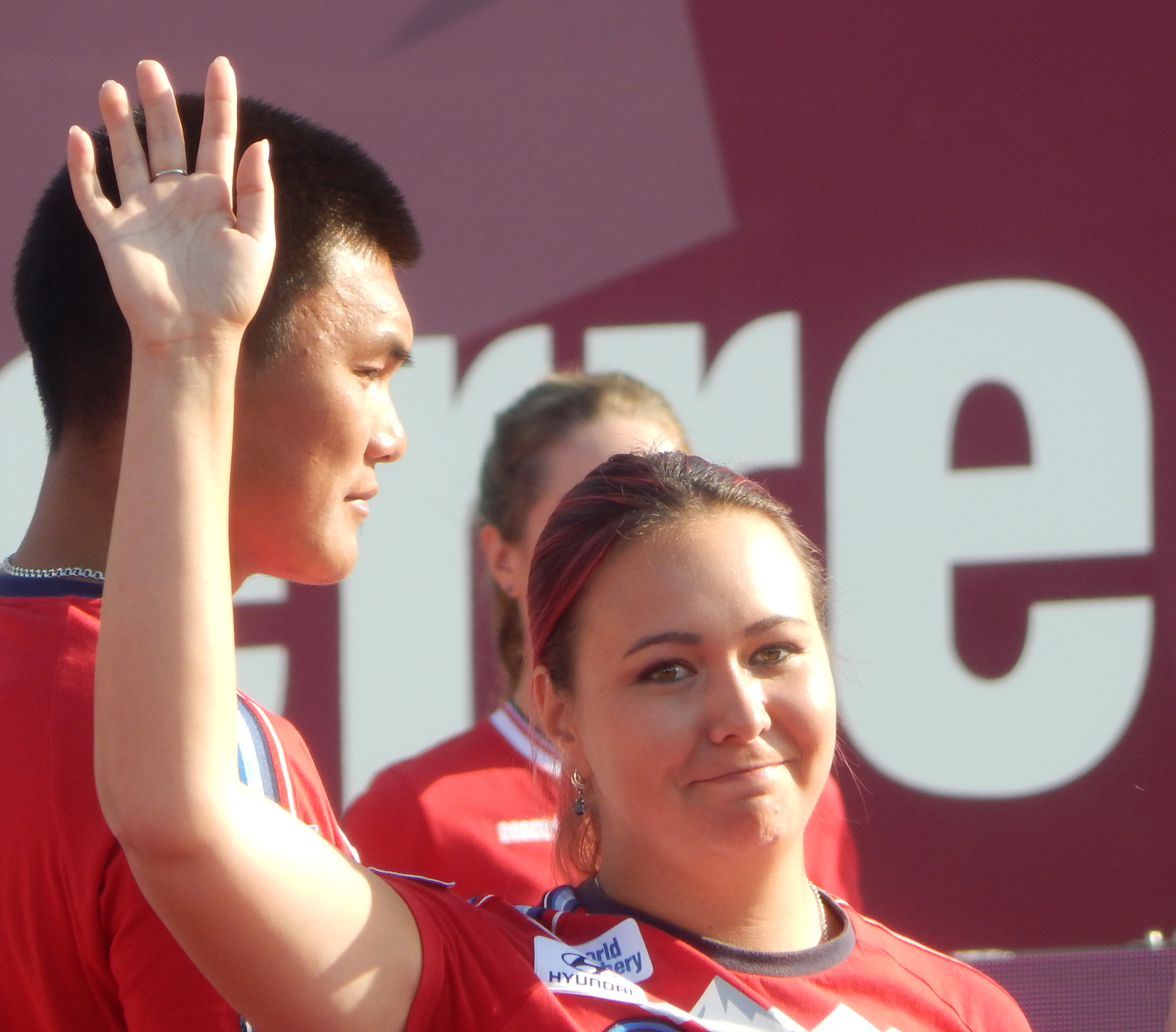
- Osipova in 2019

Personal information
- Full name: Elena Aleksandrovna Osipova
- Nationality: Russian
- Born: 22 May 1993 (age 33) Petropavlovsk-Kamchatsky, Kamchatka Krai, Russia

Sport
- Country: Russia
- Sport: Archery
- Event: recurve
Medal record
Women's archery
Representing (Russia) ROC
Olympic Games
Silver medal – second place	2020 Tokyo	Individual
Silver medal – second place	2020 Tokyo	Team
Representing Russian Archery Federation
World Championships
Silver medal – second place	2021 Yankton	Mixed team
Representing Russia
European Championships
Gold medal – first place	2021 Antalya	Team
Gold medal – first place	2021 Antalya	Mixed team
World Cup
Silver medal – second place	2019 Moscow	Mixed team
Silver medal – second place	2021 Yankton	Individual
Bronze medal – third place	2021 Lausanne	Mixed team
Military World Games
Silver medal – second place	2019 Wuhan	Team
Universiade
Bronze medal – third place	2017 Taipei	Team

Elena Aleksandrovna Osipova (Russian: Елена Александровна Осипова, IPA: [ɪ̯ɪˈlʲenə ˈosʲɪpəvə]; born 22 May 1993) is a Russian archer. Her first major result was at the 2017 Summer Universiade held in Taipei, Taiwan, where she won the bronze medal in the women's team recurve event. At the 2019 Military World Games in Wuhan, China, she won the silver medal in the women's team event.

In 2021, she competed in the individual and team event at the 2020 Summer Olympics, winning two silver medals. That year, she also won the gold medal in both the women's team recurve and mixed team recurve events at the 2021 European Archery Championships held in Antalya, Turkey.
