= Laurence Baldauff =

Austrian archer (born 1974)

Personal information
- Born: 19 November 1974 (age 51) Luxembourg
- Height: 164 cm (5 ft 5 in)

Sport
- Country: Luxembourg
- Sport: Archery
- Event: recurve
- Updated on 28 May 2021

Laurence Baldauff (born 19 November 1974) is a Luxembourgish recurve archer who represented Austria at the 2016 Summer Olympics.

== Career ==
Baldauff began practising archery at the age of sixteen while attending a sports camp. She made her international debut at the 1993 World Championships, but after failing to qualify for the 2000 Summer Olympics she chose to prioritise her career in environmental management. She later returned to the sport in 2010 under the Austrian flag.

She competed in the individual recurve event and the team recurve event at the 2015 World Archery Championships in Copenhagen, Denmark. She later qualified for the 2016 Summer Olympics in Rio de Janeiro, becoming her country's first Olympic representative in the sport since 1984. At 41 years old, she was the oldest athlete in the Austrian team. After finishing 41st of the 64 competitors in the preliminary ranking round, which determined the seedings for the subsequent elimination stages of the women's individual event, Baldauff was defeated by Bombayla Devi Laishram in the opening knockout round.

In 2018, Baldauff switched from representing Austria to Luxembourg.
