= Karina Lipiarska =

Polish archer (born 1987)

Personal information
- Full name: Karina Lipiarska-Pałka
- Born: 16 February 1987 (age 39) Kraków, Poland

Sport
- Country: Poland
- Sport: Archery
- Event: recurve
- Updated on 10 September 2015

Karina Lipiarska-Pałka (Polish pronunciation: [kaˈrina liˈpjarska ˈpawka]; born 16 February 1987) is a Polish recurve archer.

She competed in the individual recurve event and the team recurve event at the 2015 World Archery Championships in Copenhagen, Denmark, and the 2016 Summer Olympics.
