= Peng Chia-mao =

Taiwanese archer (born 1996)

Personal information
- Born: 26 September 1996 (age 29)

Sport
- Country: Chinese Taipei
- Sport: Archery
- Event: Recurve
Medal record
Women's recurve archery
Representing Chinese Taipei
World Championships
| Gold medal – first place | 2019 's-Hertogenbosch | Team |
Asian Games
| Silver medal – second place | 2018 Jakarta | Team |
Asian Championships
| Silver medal – second place | 2017 Dhaka | Team |
World Cup Final
| Bronze medal – third place | 2022 Tlaxcala | Individual |
Summer Universiade
| Gold medal – first place | 2019 Naples | Mixed team |
| Silver medal – second place | 2017 Taipei | Team |
| Bronze medal – third place | 2019 Naples | Individual |
| Bronze medal – third place | 2021 Chengdu | Individual |

Peng Chia-mao (born 26 September 1996) is a Taiwanese archer competing in women's recurve events. She won the gold medal in the women's team event at the 2019 World Archery Championships held in 's-Hertogenbosch, Netherlands.

In 2018, she won the silver medal in the women's team recurve event at the Asian Games held in Jakarta, Indonesia. In 2019, she won the bronze medal in the women's individual recurve at the Summer Universiade held in Naples, Italy. She also won the gold medal in the mixed team event.
