= Laxmi Devi =

Nepalese politician

Honourable Laxmi Devi
- लक्ष्मी देवी

Madhesh Provincial Assembly member
- Incumbent
- Assumed office 2022
- Preceded by: N/A
- Constituency: Party list

Personal details
- Party: CPN (Unified Socialist)
- Occupation: Politician

Laxmi Devi (Nepali: लक्ष्मी देवी) is a Nepalese politician and a member of Provincial Assembly of Madhesh Province from CPN (Unified Socialist). She was elected via 2022 Nepalese provincial elections from CPN (Unified Socialist) party list.
