= Veronika Marchenko (archer) =

Ukrainian archer (born 1993)

Personal information
- Full name: Veronika Serhiyivna Marchenko
- Born: 3 April 1993 (age 33) Lviv, Ukraine
- Height: 1.57 m (5 ft 2 in)
- Weight: 48 kg (106 lb)

Sport
- Country: Ukraine
- Sport: Archery
- Event: Recurve
Medal record
Women's archery
Representing Ukraine
World Indoor Championships
Gold medal – first place	2014 Nîmes	Team
Bronze medal – third place	2018 Yankton	Team
European Archery Championships
Gold medal – first place	2016 Nottingham	Individual
Gold medal – first place	2016 Nottingham	Team
European Indoor Championships
Gold medal – first place	2017 Vittel	Individual
Gold medal – first place	2022 Laško	Team
Bronze medal – third place	2017 Vittel	Team
Bronze medal – third place	2026 Plovdiv	Individual
Bronze medal – third place	2026 Plovdiv	Team
European Games
Bronze medal – third place	2015 Baku	Team
World Junior Indoor Championships
Gold medal – first place	2012 Las Vegas	Team
- Updated on 22 February 2017

Veronika Serhiyivna Marchenko (Ukrainian: Вероніка Сергіївна Марченко; born 3 April 1993) is a Ukrainian competitive archer. She has collected medals in major international competitions, spanning the World Indoor Championships, the European Games, and the European Championships.

== Career ==
Marchenko rose to prominence on the global archery scene at the 2014 World Indoor Championships in Nimes, France. There, she and her compatriots Lidiia Sichenikova and Anastasia Pavlova powered past the German women (234–220) on a tactical 14-point advantage to capture the team recurve title (234–220). Marchenko also added the bronze to the trio's career treasury by ousting the neighboring Russia in a high-quality 5–4 shoot-off at the 2015 European Games in Baku, Azerbaijan.

Marchenko was selected to compete for the Ukrainian squad at the 2016 Summer Olympics in Rio de Janeiro, shooting in both individual and team recurve tournaments. Two months before her maiden Games, she commanded the Ukrainian trio in thrashing the Estonian side for one of three women's team spaces at the World Archery Cup meet in Antalya, Turkey. Marchenko opened the tournament by discharging a total of 630 points, 15 perfect tens, and 6 bull's eyes to seal the thirtieth seed heading to the knockout draw from the classification round, along with the trio's cumulative score of 1,890. Sitting at eighth in the women's team recurve, Marchenko, along with Pavlova and Sichenikova, slipped out of their initial round match to a convincing 2–6 defeat from the ninth-seeded Japanese women. In the women's individual recurve, Marchenko successfully overcame Estonia's Laura Nurmsalu for a comfortable 6–0 victory in the opening round, before she faced a 2–6 conquest in her subsequent match from the defending champion Ki Bo-bae of South Korea.

She won the gold medal in the women's team recurve event at the 2022 European Indoor Archery Championships held in Laško, Slovenia.
