= Christine Bjerendal =

Swedish archer (born 1987)

Christine Bjerendal (born 3 February 1987 in Lindome, Sweden) is a Swedish archer. She competed in the individual event at the 2012 Summer Olympics, 2016 Summer Olympics and 2020 Summer Olympics. Her father Göran Bjerendal and uncle Gert Bjerendal were also Olympic archers.
