= Olga Senyuk =

Moldovan–born Azerbaijani-Ukrainian archer

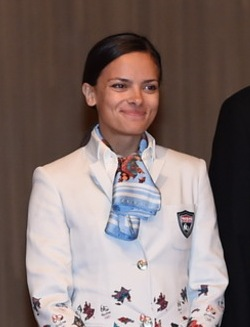
- Senyuk in 2016

Personal information
- Born: 23 January 1991 (age 35) Chișinău, Moldova

Sport
- Country: Ukraine (2006–2013, 2019–present); Azerbaijan (2014–16)
- Sport: Archery
- Event: recurve
- Updated on 9 January 2022

Olga Senyuk (born 23 January 1991) is a Moldovan–born Ukrainian recurve archer who competed for Azerbaijan from 2014 to 2016, including at the 2016 Summer Olympics.

She competed in the individual recurve event at the 2015 World Archery Championships in Copenhagen, Denmark, and represented Azerbaijan at the 2016 Summer Olympics in Rio de Janeiro.
