= Adriana Martín (archer) =

Spanish archer (born 1996)

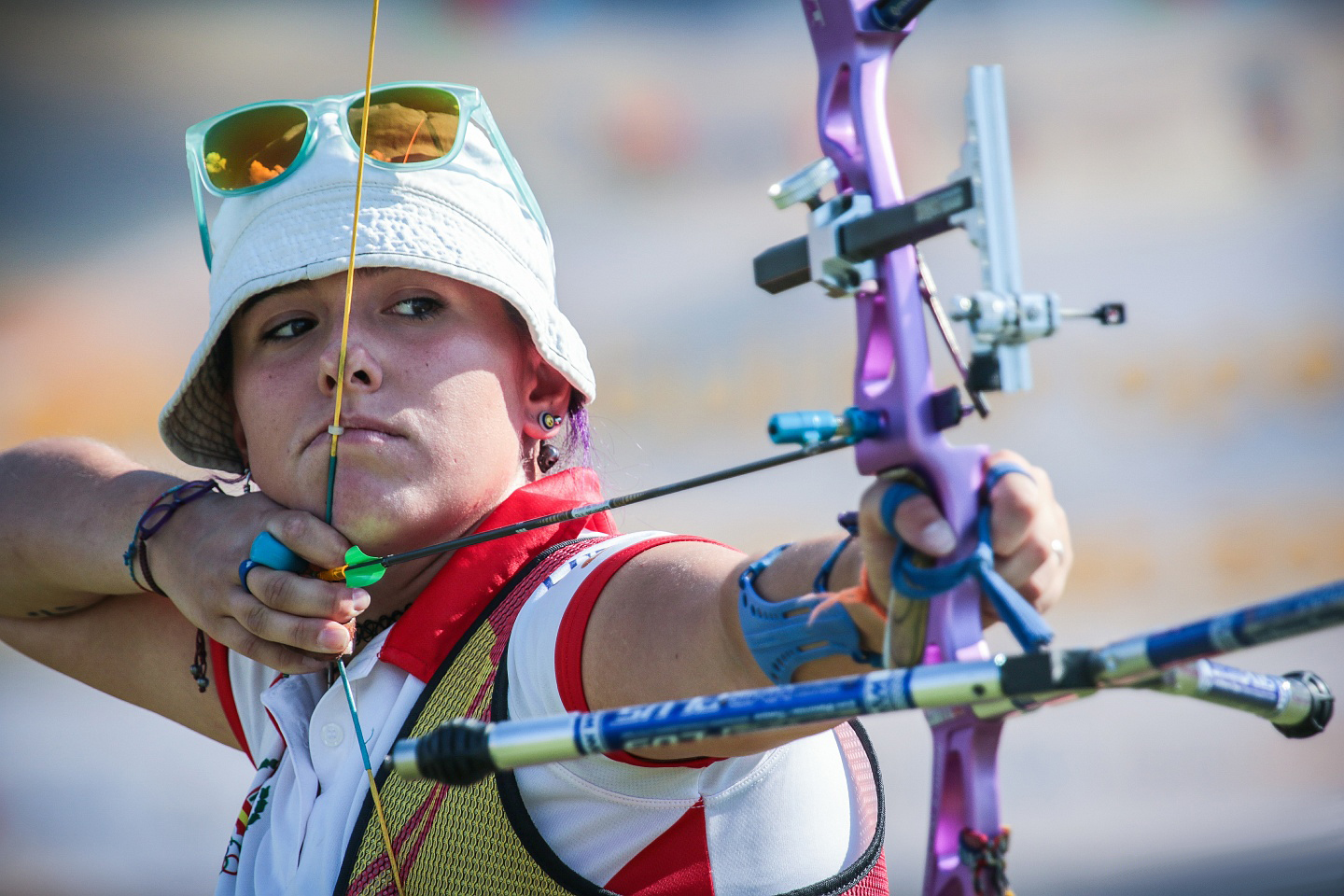

Personal information
- Full name: Adriana Rosa Martín Lázaro
- Born: 12 April 1996 (age 30) Madrid, Spain

Sport
- Country: Spain
- Sport: Archery
- Event: recurve

Adriana Rosa Martín Lázaro (born 12 April 1996) is a female Spanish recurve archer from Madrid. She competed in the individual recurve event and the team recurve event at the 2015 World Archery Championships in Copenhagen, Denmark, and represented Spain at the 2016 Summer Olympics. Also in 2016, she came third in the 2016 European Youth Archery Championships and won the European Youth recurve archery event.
