= Tuyana Dashidorzhieva =

Russian archer (born 1996)

Personal information
- Full name: Tuyana Norpolovna; Dashidorzhieva
- Born: 14 April 1996 (age 30) Chita, Russia
- Height: 1.69 m (5 ft 7 in)
- Weight: 57 kg (126 lb)

Sport
- Country: Russia
- Sport: Archery
- Event: Recurve
Medal record
Women's archery
Representing Russia
Olympic Games
Silver medal – second place	2016 Rio de Janeiro	Team
World Championships
Gold medal – first place	2015 Copenhagen	Team
Universiade
Bronze medal – third place	2015 Gwangju	Team
Bronze medal – third place	2017 Taipei	Team
- Updated on 22 February 2017

Tuyana Norpolovna Dashidorzhieva (Russian: Туяна Норполовна Дашидоржиева; born 14 April 1996) is a Russian competitive archer. She helped her compatriots and experienced Olympians Ksenia Perova and Inna Stepanova secure a historic team recurve title at the 2015 World Championships in Copenhagen, a silver at the 2016 Summer Olympics in Rio de Janeiro, and a bronze at the 2015 Summer Universiade in Gwangju, completing a full set of medals throughout her sporting career in a major international competition.

Dashidorzhieva rose to prominence in the global archery scene at the 2015 Summer Universiade in Gwangju, South Korea. There, she and her compatriots Stepanova and Anna Balsukova teamed up to defeat Mexico 6–2 for their bronze-medal triumph in the women's team recurve tournament.

Shortly after the Universiade, Dashidorzhieva contributed to the Russian trio's performance by narrowly dispatching the Indian women in a tie-breaker to end a 28-year-old interlude for their country's historic team recurve crown, and secure a full quota place for Rio 2016 at the World Championships in Copenhagen, Denmark.

Dashidorzhieva was selected to compete for the Russian squad at the 2016 Summer Olympics in Rio de Janeiro, shooting in both individual and team recurve tournaments. First, Dashidorzhieva discharged 654 points to lead the Russian trio for the fifth seed heading to the knockout draw, along with her team's score of 1,938 attained in the classification round. Sitting behind the South Koreans at second position in the women's team recurve, Dashidorzhieva and her teammates Stepanova and Perova could not overthrow their opponents from a possible historic streak of eight Olympic titles, as the Russian trio ended the tournament by taking the silver instead at 1–5. Few days later, in the women's individual recurve, Dashidorzhieva fought valiantly to dispose Bhutan's Karma (7–3) from the opening round, before she succumbed to a 4–6 defeat in her subsequent match from the unheralded Chinese archer Cao Hui.
