= Tan Ya-ting =

Taiwanese archer (born 1993)

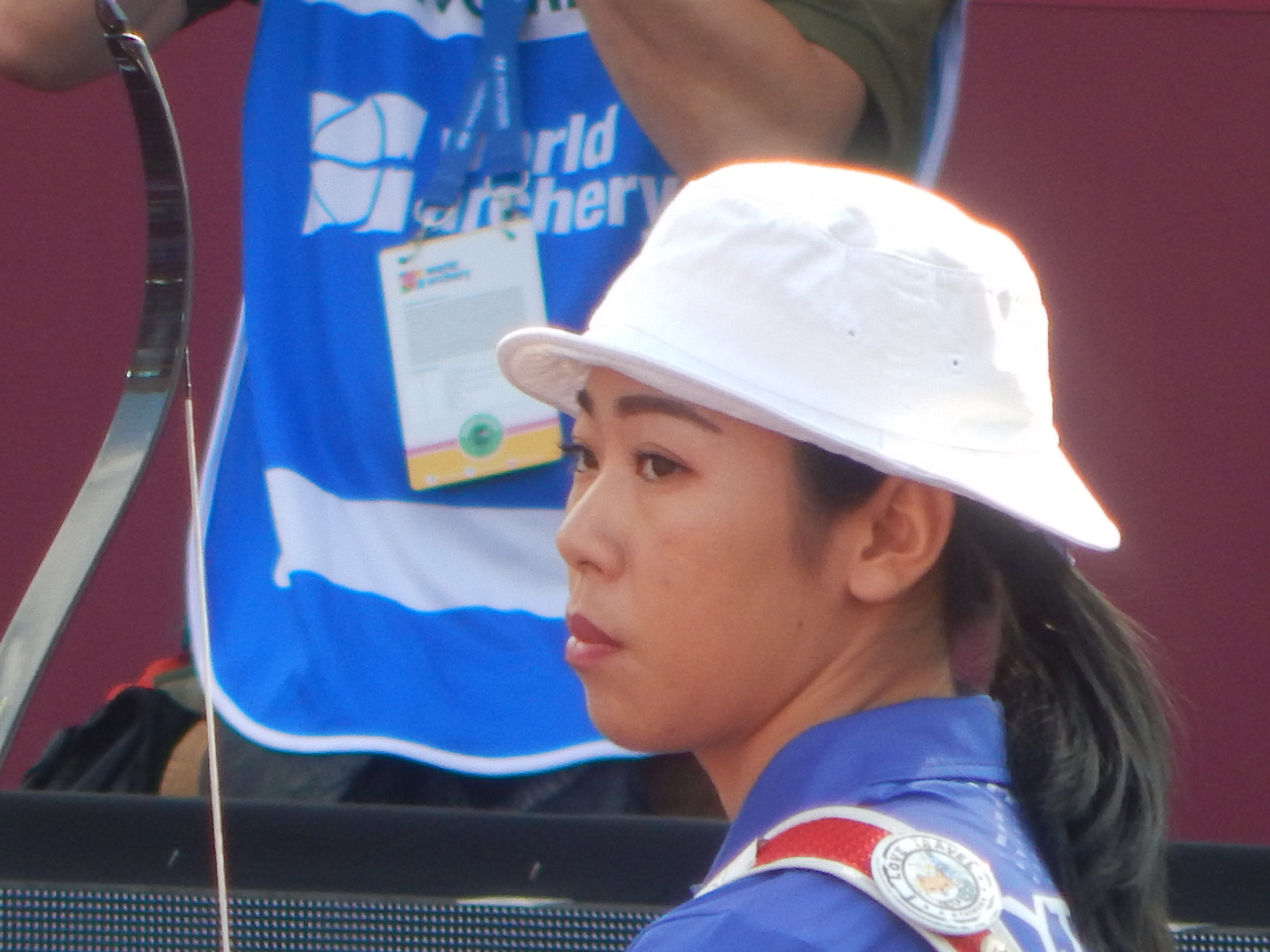
- Tan at the 2019 Archery World Cup Final

Personal information
- Born: 7 November 1993 (age 32) Hsinchu, Taiwan

Sport
- Country: Taiwan
- Sport: Archery
- Event: Recurve
Medal record
Women's recurve archery
Representing Chinese Taipei
Olympic Games
Bronze medal – third place	2016 Rio de Janeiro	Team
World Championships
Gold medal – first place	2019 's-Hertogenbosch	Team
Bronze medal – third place	2013 Belek	Mixed team
Bronze medal – third place	2017 Mexico	Individual
Bronze medal – third place	2017 Mexico	Team
Asian Games
Silver medal – second place	2018 Jakarta	Team
Asian Championships
Silver medal – second place	2013 Taipei	Team
Bronze medal – third place	2013 Taipei	Mixed team
Summer Universiade
Gold medal – first place	2015 Gwangju	Team
Silver medal – second place	2015 Gwangju	Mixed Team
Silver medal – second place	2017 Taipei	Individual
Silver medal – second place	2017 Taipei	Team
Youth Olympic Games
Silver medal – second place	2010 Singapore	Individual

Tan Ya-ting (Chinese: 譚雅婷; pinyin: Tán Yǎtíng; born 7 November 1993) is an archer who represents Chinese Taipei. She is a three-time Olympian, having participated at the 2010 Summer Youth Olympics and the 2012 and 2016 Summer Olympics. She has additionally competed in the World Archery Championships and the Archery World Cup.

Tan's first international medal came in the girls' individual event of the 2010 Summer Youth Olympics, earning silver medal after losing to former FITA Archery World Cup champion Kwak Ye-Ji in the final. She finished ninth overall in the women's individual event at the 2012 Summer Olympics, and won bronze medal in the women's team event four years later at the 2016 Summer Olympics. She was a member of the team that won Chinese Taipei's first recurve title at the 2019 World Archery Championships.

She has qualified for the 2020 Summer Olympics.
