= Luiza Saidiyeva =

Kazakhstani archer (born 1994)

Personal information
- Full name: Luiza Saidiyeva
- Born: 17 March 1994 (age 32) Shymkent, Kazakhstan
- Height: 1.62 m (5 ft 4 in)
- Weight: 42 kg (93 lb)

Sport
- Country: Kazakhstan
- Sport: Archery
- Event: Recurve
- Updated on 24 February 2017

Luiza Saidiyeva (Kazakh: Луиза Сайдиева; born 17 March 1994) is a Kazakh competitive archer. She competed as a member of the Kazakh archery squad in major international tournaments, spanning the World Championships, Asian Championships, the 2014 Asian Games, and the 2016 Summer Olympics.

== Career ==
Saidiyeva was selected to compete for Kazakhstan in the women's individual recurve at the 2016 Summer Olympics in Rio de Janeiro, Brazil. There, she discharged a score of 625 points, 9 perfect tens, and 3 bull's eyes to seal the thirty-sixth seed in the classification stage, but could not get past Ukraine's Anastasia Pavlova from the opening round, abruptly ending her Olympic debut in a severe 0–6 defeat.
