= Laura Nurmsalu =

Estonian archer (born 1994)

Personal information
- Born: 1 June 1994 (age 32) Tartu, Estonia
- Height: 170 cm (5 ft 7 in)

Sport
- Country: Estonia
- Sport: Archery
- Event: Recurve
- Updated on 10 September 2015

Laura Nurmsalu (born 1 June 1994) is an Estonian recurve archer who competed at the 2016 Summer Olympics.

Nurmsalu represented her country at the 2015 European Games in Baku, Azerbaijan. She competed in the individual recurve event and the team recurve event at the 2015 World Archery Championships in Copenhagen.

Nurmsalu made her Olympic debut in 2016, where she was eliminated in the second round of the women's individual event. In 2019, Nurmsalu contested the European Games in Minsk, finishing the ranking round of the women's individual recurve competition in twenty-seventh place.
