= Lidiia Sichenikova =

Ukrainian archer (born 1993)

Medal record

Women's archery

Representing Ukraine

World Indoor Championships
Gold medal – first place	2014 Nîmes	Team

European Games
Bronze medal – third place	2015 Baku	Team
Bronze medal – third place	2015 Baku	Mixed Team

European Archery Championships
Gold medal – first place	2016 Nottingham	Team

European Indoor Championships
Gold medal – first place	2013 Rzeszów	Team
Silver medal – second place	2019 Samsun	Individual
Bronze medal – third place	2017 Vittel	Team

World Youth Championships
Gold medal – first place	2013 Wuxi	Team

Lidiia Yuriyivna Sichenikova (Ukrainian: Лідія Юріївна Січеннікова; 3 February 1993, Chernivtsi) is a Ukrainian archer who competed at the 2012 Summer Olympics in the women's individual and women's team events.
