= Archery at the 2016 Summer Olympics – Women's individual =

Women's individual at the Games of the XXXI Olympiad
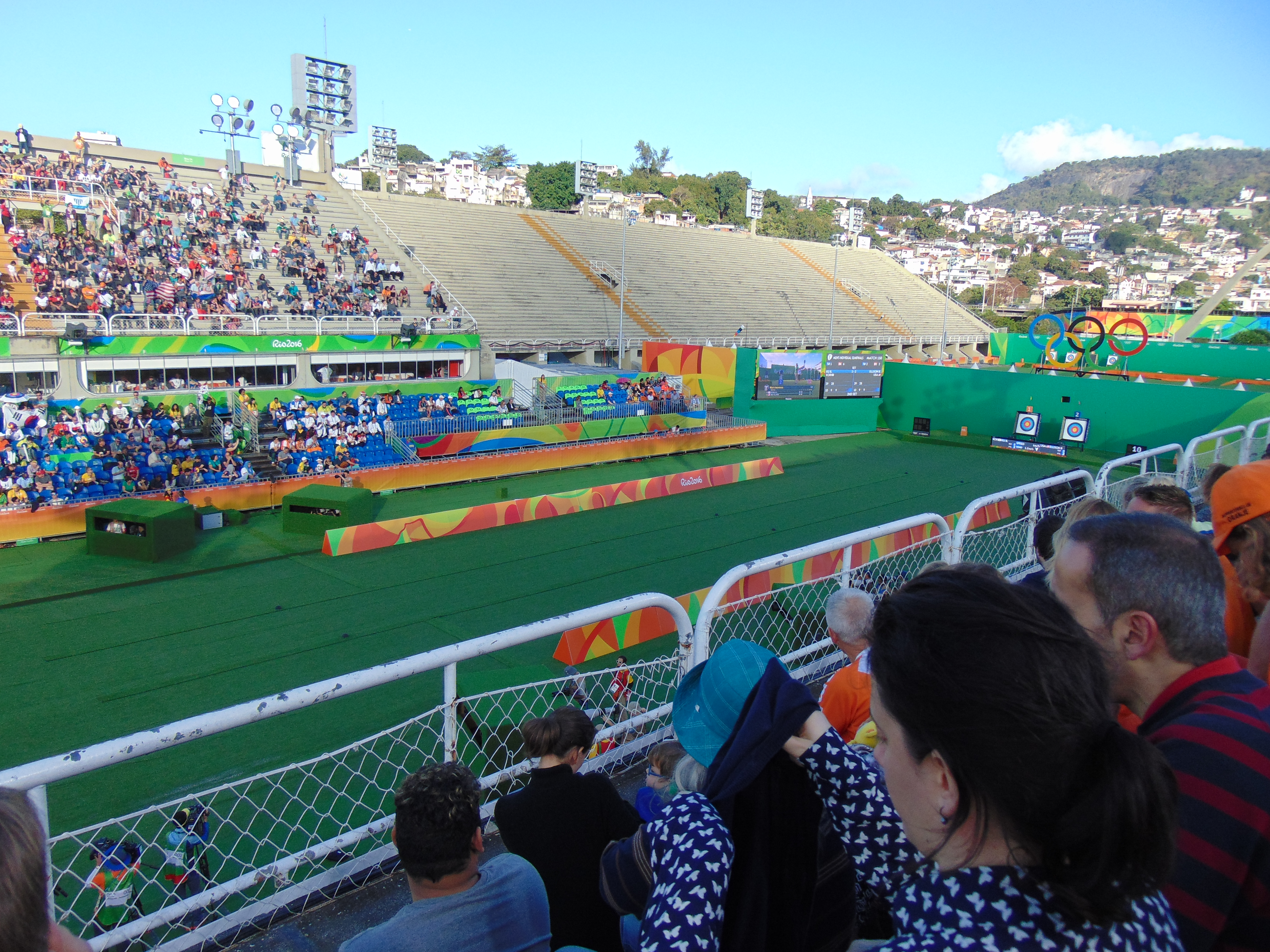
- The Sambadrome in Rio de Janeiro's Cidade Nova neighbourhood hosted the event.
- Venue: Sambadrome Marquês de Sapucaí
- Date: 5–11 August 2016
- Competitors: 64 from 40 nations

Medalists
1st place, gold medalist(s)		Chang Hye-jin	South Korea
2nd place, silver medalist(s)		Lisa Unruh	Germany
3rd place, bronze medalist(s)		Ki Bo-bae	South Korea

The women's individual archery event at the 2016 Summer Olympics was held from 5 to 13 August at the Sambadrome Marquês de Sapucaí in Rio de Janeiro, Brazil. One of four archery events as part of the 2016 Olympic catalogue of sports, it was the fourteenth time a women's individual competition was contested as a discipline at the Olympic Games. Forty different nations qualified for the event, sending a total of sixty-four archers to compete. The defending Olympic champion was Ki Bo-bae of South Korea.

South Korea's three archers were tipped for success, the nation having won all but one of the event's gold medals since the 1984 Summer Olympics. Ki and her South Korean teammates Choi Mi-sun and Chang Hye-jin dominated the initial ranking round and secured the top three seeds for the elimination rounds, entering the knockout phase having also won gold medal in the women's team event. Choi, who entered ranked as the world's number one archer, was however eliminated in the quarter-finals by Alejandra Valencia of Mexico; world number two Tan Ya-ting of Chinese Taipei, another favourite for the gold medal, also fell at the same stage. Chang defeated Ki in the semi-finals and went on to face Germany's Lisa Unruh in the final, defeating the German to claim her second gold medal of the Games. In the bronze medal match Ki beat Valencia to win her fourth career Olympic medal.

Chang's gold medal victory continued South Korea's near-domination of the event. Archery became South Korea's most successful Olympic discipline, while Unruh's silver medal gave Germany its first Olympic archery medal in sixteen years.

== Background ==
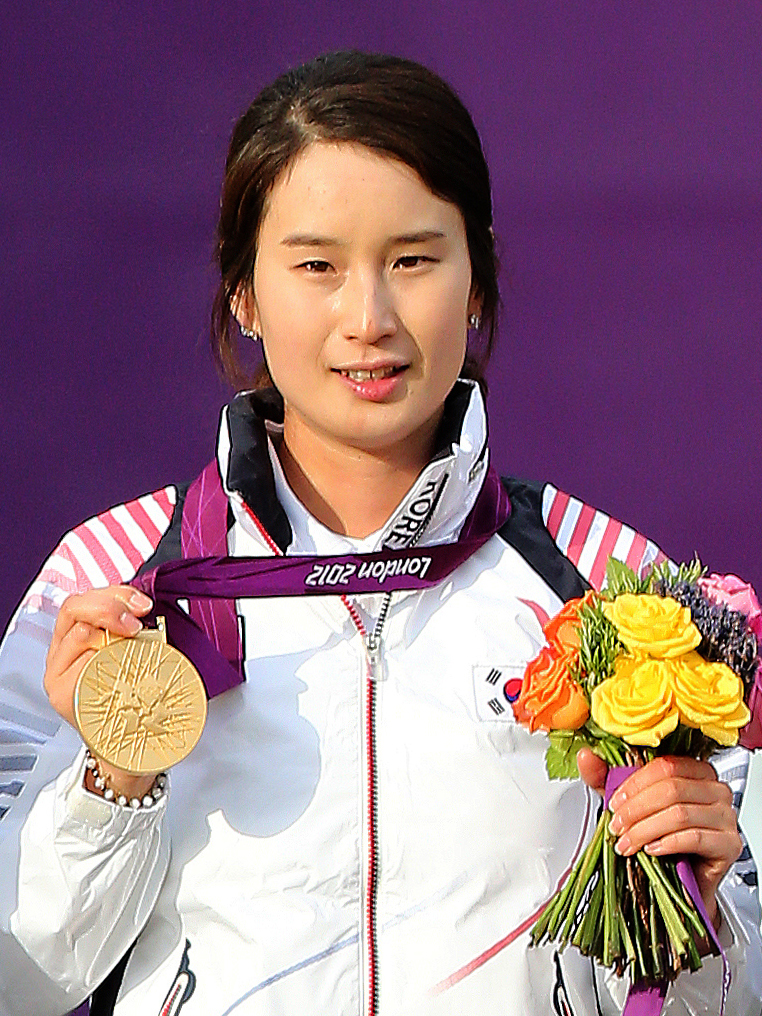
Ki Bo-bae (pictured at the 2012 Summer Olympics) was the defending Olympic champion.

The women's individual event has been held as part of every Summer Olympics archery programme since the reintroduction of the sport at the 1972 Games in Munich; individual competitions for women had also previously been held at the 1904 and 1908 Summer Olympics. Heading into the Rio 2016 event, archers from South Korea had been the most successful overall with seven gold medal victories, success coming particularly from the 1984 Summer Olympics onwards. The United States were ranked second in number of gold medals with four, with Great Britain, the Soviet Union and China having won one apiece.

At the previous Olympic Games held at Lord's Cricket Ground in London, Ki Bo-bae won the gold medal, reclaiming the Olympic title for South Korea after Zhang Juanjuan's victory on home soil at the 2008 Beijing Olympics interrupted a six-time winning streak for South Korea in the women's individual discipline. Ki had narrowly defeated Mexico's Aída Román in a one-arrow shoot-off in the final, earning her a second Olympic gold medal following victory in the women's team event four days earlier. Román and her Mexican teammate Mariana Avitia, who had defeated Khatuna Lorig of the United States in the bronze medal match, became Mexico's first ever Olympic medal-winners in archery.

An official test event, the Aquece Rio International Archery Challenge, was held over eight days at the Sambadrome Marquês de Sapucaí in September 2015. The purpose of the event was to evaluate the venue's preparations and give archers and coaches the chance to familiarise themselves with the location and schedule ahead of the Games the following year. South Korea's Choi Mi-sun emerged victorious in the women's individual event by defeating Tan Ya-ting of Chinese Taipei in the final, with Mackenzie Brown of the United States third and Japan's Kaori Kawanaka finishing in fourth.

== Qualification ==
Sixty-four places were available for the event with each National Olympic Committee (NOC) represented by a maximum of three archers. Thirty-three of these places were open for the eleven nations qualifying for the Olympic women's team event, the 2015 World Archery Championships' women's team recurve event held in Copenhagen acting as the primary qualifying tournament in awarding twenty-four places. Eight nations - China, Colombia, Georgia, India, Japan, South Korea, Mexico, and Russia - secured the maximum berth of archers as the highest-placed teams. The remaining three team entries were decided at the Final Qualification Tournament held as part of the third stage of the 2016 Archery World Cup in Antalya, with Italy, Chinese Taipei, and Ukraine securing the final three woman positions. As the host of the 2016 Olympics, Brazil automatically qualified for three places as the twelfth team nation.

The NOCs that were unsuccessful in winning a three-member team entry were each limited to qualifying one archer. Of the twenty-eight remaining qualification positions, eight were awarded to the NOCs of the highest-ranked archers at the 2015 World Archery Championships women's individual recurve event, fourteen to those at a series of qualifying tournaments organised by the continental archery federations, and three to those at the Final Qualification Tournament in Antalya. The final three places were awarded to NOCs that entered fewer than eight athletes in individual disciplines at the 2008 and 2012 Summer Olympics, the motivation being seek to increase representation from non-traditional archery nations as well as abiding by the universal representation ethos of the Olympic Charter. The three NOCs selected were Bangladesh, Bhutan, and Myanmar.

=== National selections ===
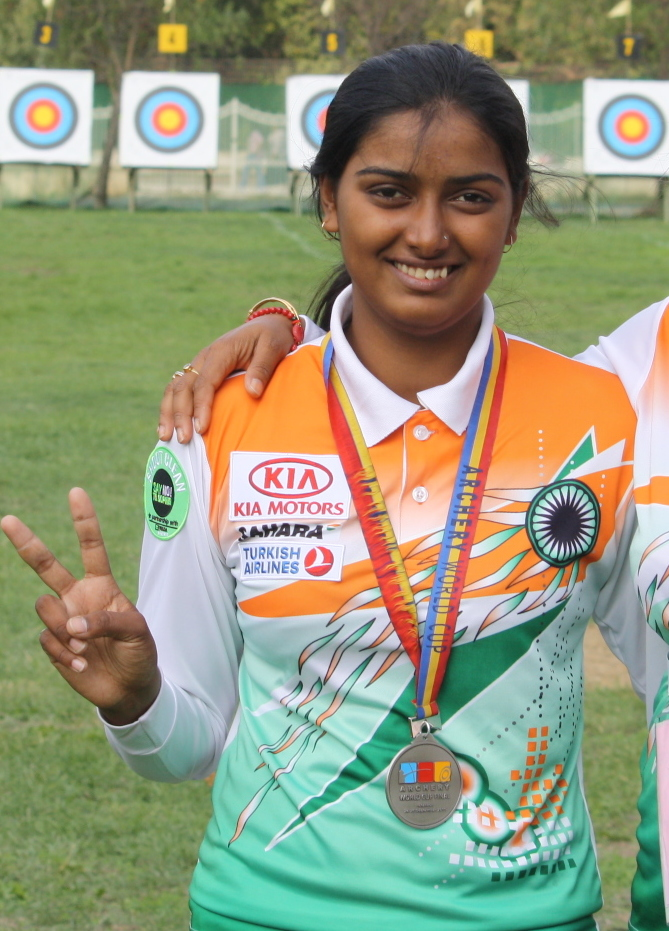
Deepika Kumari (pictured in 2011) entered her second Olympic Games for India.

With the qualification positions for the Olympic event awarded to the NOCs of the successful archers, rather than the archers themselves, each NOC was free to choose its representatives through its own selection procedure. Defending Olympic champion Ki was chosen alongside Olympic debutants Choi Mi-sun and Chang Hye-jin to head the South Korean squad. The three had placed highest in the Korean national team selection competition which concluded in April 2016, Chang beating Kang Chae-young into third-place having narrowly missed out on Olympic selection four years earlier. Aída Román, the silver medalist from the 2012 Olympics, was joined by Gabriela Bayardo and 2011 Pan American Games champion Alejandra Valencia to spearhead the Mexican team, with London 2012 bronze medalist Mariana Avitia failing to rank highly enough in the national selection procedure to contest a third Olympic Games.

Several nations selected experienced Olympians. Great Britain's Naomi Folkard and Georgia's Khatuna Narimanidze and Kristine Esebua were all chosen to compete in their fourth Games, while Greece's selection of Evangelia Psarra made her the most experienced Olympian in the field, Psarra contesting her fifth consecutive Olympic Games. The Chinese Taipei team featured one change from its London 2012 trio, Lin Shih-chia joining Tan Ya-ting and Le Chien-ying in what journalist John Stanley described as a "formidable" line-up. Russia too made just one change, retaining Ksenia Perova and Inna Stepanova from their 2012 team and picking Tuyana Dashidorzhieva as their third entrant. Following the publication of the McLaren Report concerning allegations of state-sponsored doping of Russian athletes, the trio were approved and cleared to compete by the World Archery Federation in July 2016 having had no history of using performance-enhancing drugs.

India also selected two athletes from its 2012 squad for its three-woman contingent, former youth world champion Deepika Kumari and Laishram Bombayla Devi partnering Olympic newcomer Laxmirani Majhi in the country's latest attempt to secure its first Olympic archery medal. In contrast, Italy's team of three was entirely new, Guendalina Sartori captaining the squad after the retirement of six-time Olympian Natalia Valeeva. Brazil likewise featured three Olympic debutantes in its lineup, the performances Ane Marcelle dos Santos, Sarah Nikitin, and Marina Canetta in the second and third stages of the 2016 Archery World Cup meriting their selection for the host nation.

Australia, Canada, and the United States were among those to send first-time Olympians as their sole representatives. Alice Ingley was promoted from her reserve role at the 2012 Olympics having shown good form at team selection camps, while Mackenzie Brown beat four-time Olympian Khatuna Lorig to victory at the US women's trials to secure her first Olympic berth. Canada nominated Georcy-Stéphanie Picard, who had previously represented her country at the 2015 Pan American Games. Zahra Nemati, the reigning Paralympic champion in the W1/W2 wheelchair discipline, was selected by Iran for her Olympic debut following her silver medal at the 2018 Asian Archery Championships. Nemati entered as the only archer competing in both the 2016 Summer Olympics and Paralympics.

== Format ==
An official World Archery target is divided into ten evenly-spaced concentric rings. The central black-lined ring, worth 10 points, is further divided into an outer and inner ring. The number of arrows landing within these two rings is used as a tiebreaker in the ranking round.

The women's individual was an outdoor target archery event using recurve bows. Held under World Archery-approved rules, archers shot at a 122 cm-wide target from a distance of 70 metres, each arrow earning between one and ten points depending on how close it landed to the centre of the target. The competition comprised an initial ranking round, five elimination rounds, and two finals matches which decided the winners of the gold, silver, and bronze medals. In the ranking round, which took place on 5 August, each of the 64 archers entering the competition shot a total of 72 arrows. The total score of each archer was used to seed the archers into the following five-round single-elimination tournament, the highest-scoring archer receiving the number one seed. If two or more archers finished with the same total score, the number of arrows shot in the central 10-ring on the target was used as a tie-breaker. If two or more archers were still tied, then the number of arrows shot within the inner-10 ring determined the finishing positions. If the archers still could still not be separated then a disk toss was to be employed to decide the final order.

The elimination rounds and medal matches, held over four days from 8 to 11 August, used the Archery Olympic Round set system introduced at the 2012 Summer Olympics. Each match consisted of a maximum of five sets, with archers each shooting three arrows per set. The archer with the best score from their three arrows won the set, earning two set points. The archer with the lowest score in each set received zero set points. If the score was tied, each archer received one set point. The first archer to set six points was declared the winner. If the match was tied at five set points apiece after the maximum five sets were played, each archer shot one more arrow with the one shooting closest to centre of the target winning.

== Schedule ==
Day	Date	Time	Phase
Day 0	Friday 5 August 2016	13:00	Ranking round
Day 3	Monday 8 August 2016	09:00-17:45	1/32 & 1/16 Eliminations
Day 4	Tuesday 9 August 2016	09:00-17:45	1/32 & 1/16 Eliminations
Day 5	Wednesday 10 August 2016	09:00-18:55	1/32 & 1/16 Eliminations
Day 6	Thursday 11 August 2016	09:00-17:10	1/8 Eliminations
Day 6	Thursday 11 August 2016	09:00-17:10	Quarter-finals
Day 6	Thursday 11 August 2016	09:00-17:10	Semi-finals
Day 6	Thursday 11 August 2016	09:00-17:10	Bronze medal match
Day 6	Thursday 11 August 2016	09:00-17:10	Gold medal match
All times are Brasília Time (UTC−03:00); Source:

== Report ==
=== Pre-event ===
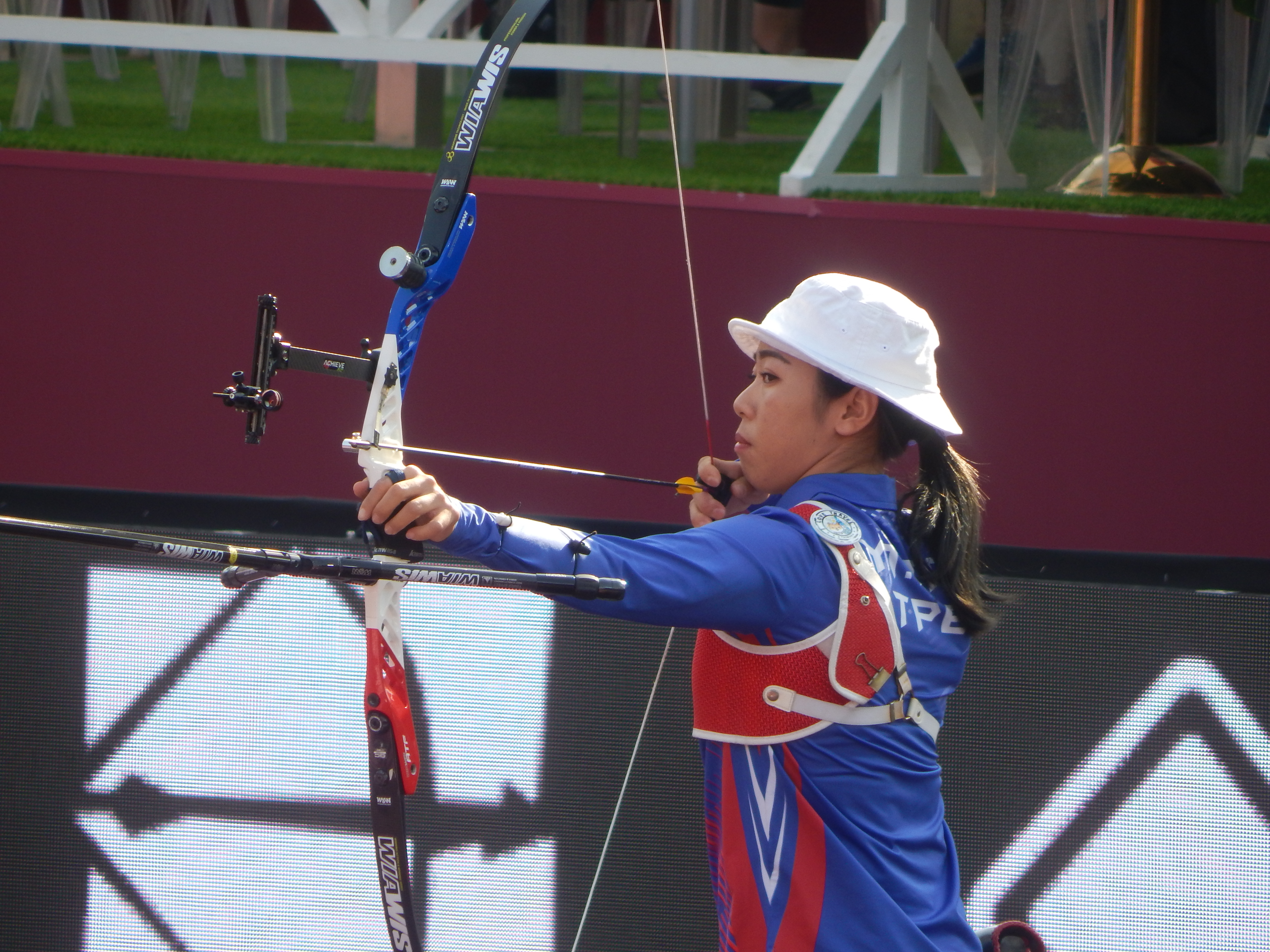
Tan Ya-Ting (pictured at the 2019 Archery World Cup) entered as one of the favourites to compete for an Olympic medal.

With South Korea's long-established record of success in the women's individual event, the trio of Ki Bo-bae, Chang Hye-jin, and Choi Mi-sun entered as favourites to challenge for the gold medal. Ki and Choi in particular were tipped for victory by several observers, including commentator George Tekmitchov, compound archer Sara López, and World Archery journalist Andrea Vasquez. Jane Zorowitz of NBC predicted that Choi was Ki's biggest obstacle to retaining her Olympic title.

Others favoured those outside the South Korean team. Former Olympians Juan René Serrano and Natalia Valeeva picked Aída Román and Deepika Kumari as their favourites, whereas broadcaster Carl Arky selected Chinese Taipei's Tan Ya-ting as his choice for gold medal. Zorowitz also listed Tan and her teammate Lei Chien-ying as serious medal challengers, while Vinica Weiss of Sports Illustrated called Ksenia Perova as one of her athletes to watch. Peter Rutherford of Reuters further suggested that the rising number of archery teams employing Korean coaches in an attempt to emulate South Korea's track record would increase the number of contenders for the Olympic crown.

=== Ranking round ===
The event began on the afternoon of Friday 5 August with the 72-arrow ranking round. Choi topped the leaderboard with a score of 669 points out of a maximum of 720, beating teammates Chang Hye-jin and Ki Bo-bae, who ranked second and third with 666 and 663 points respectively. By earning the top three seeds for the elimination rounds the trio delayed any potential intra-team match-ups until the semi-finals at the earliest. Choi had begun the round strongly and was on course to surpass Lina Herasymenko's twenty-year-old Olympic record of 673 points. Breezy conditions however intervened mid-way through the round, affecting her aiming and halting her progress. Speaking afterwards Choi commented that despite the weather she was happy with the performances of both herself and her teammates, saying "[w]e have the best players, we have talent and skill. It's so windy that people can get overwhelmed, but we (did) well in the end."

Citing a busy schedule, the Indian archers elected to skip the opening ceremony, which took place later in the evening of 5 August, to fully concentrate on the ranking round. Deepika Kumari and Bombayla Devi Laishram both made promising starts that afternoon, and by the halfway point Kumari was placed fifth and Laishram had risen as high as eighth. Inconsistent shooting from both however saw them fall away from the leaders over the final thirty-six arrows, Kumari concluding the round in 20th place with 640 points, while Laishram finished four places below on 638 points. The Indo-Asian News Service however summarised the Olympic debut of Laxmirani Majhi, the third member of the Indian team, as "disappointing", Mahji ending on 614 points in 43rd place.

For the three Italian archers, Michele Cassano of OA Sport was optimistic in his analysis of the potential match-ups to come following Lucilla Boari's seventh-placed finish with 651 points, but was more ambivalent about thirteenth-seed Guendalina Sartori, whose path to the latter stages of the competition included Kumari and Georgia's Kristine Esebua. He however likened Claudia Mandia's path to the circles of hell in Dante's Inferno, the Italian scoring 612 points to finish forty-sixth and entering the elimination rounds in the same bracket as Mackenzie Brown, Finland's Taru Kuoppa, and reigning Olympic champion Ki.

=== Elimination rounds ===
After a two-day break over the weekend, in which the men's and women's team events were contested, the women's individual competition resumed on the morning of Monday 8 August for the beginning of the elimination rounds. Held concurrently with the same stages of the men's individual competition, the 1/32 and 1/16 eliminations lasted until Wednesday 10 August, while the women's 1/16 round took place on the morning of Thursday 11 August.

==== 8 August ====
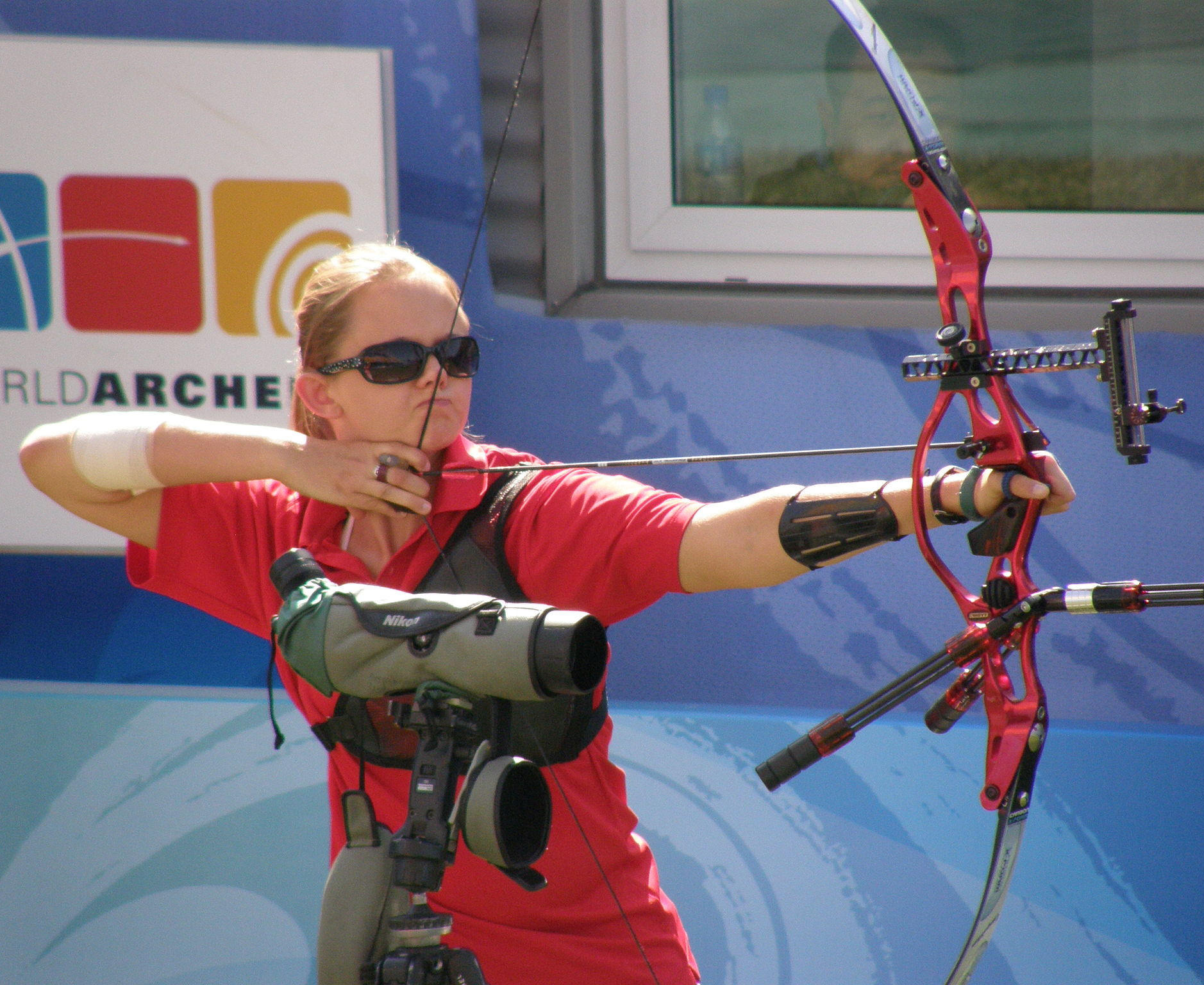
Mackenzie Brown (pictured in 2015) entered as world number four but lost in the second elimination round.

Monday saw Ki in action, the defending champion winning her first two matches without dropping a set to advance to the last sixteen against Myanmar's San Yu Htwe. Hwte, who entered the competition through Myanmar's invitational place and was seeded fifty-first after the ranking round, pulled off two surprise results in a row by defeating both fourteenth-seed Taru Kuoppa and nineteenth-seed Mackenzie Brown, conceding just one set in each match. Ki's opponent in the final at the 2012 Olympics, Aída Román, was also in action but failed replicate her silver medal-winning run from 2012, losing to Moldova's Alexandra Mîrca in the 1/32 elimination round. Despite being seeded eleven places lower than Mîrca, the Mexican's loss was still regarded as an upset by Notimex, who concluded that her performance at the Games fell below expectations. Román cited the wind as her biggest difficulty on a day that saw greater wind gusts than on the previous day.

Seventh-seed Lucilla Boari was another archer to suffer a surprise opening-round defeat on the Monday, losing to the Australian fifty-eighth seed Alice Ingley in the day's afternoon session. Boari's defeat was the second endured by an Italian archer that day, Mandia having earlier succumbed to Mackenzie Brown in the 1/32 elimination round. Francesco Lionetti of the Italian website Sportface blamed the defeats on the mood of disappointment in the Italian camp, which stemmed from Boari, Mandia, and Sartori having narrowly missed out on a bronze medal against Chinese Taipei in the women's team event the day before. Ingley was herself eliminated later in her second match of the day against Brazil's Ane Marcelle dos Santos. The Brazilian had earlier defeated Saori Nagamine of Japan, breaking down in tears as the home crowd gave her a standing ovation.

==== 9 August ====
The second day of the elimination rounds on Tuesday 9 August saw fewer surprise results. Jane Zorowitz of NBC summarised that the day saw "no huge upsets, and for the most part, those whom were believed to move on to the next rounds did." Iran's Zahra Nemati, the sole Paralympian in the competition, had the support of the crowd in her opening bout against Russia's Inna Stepanova, but despite a strong start ultimately lost by six set points to two. Speaking to the media after the match, Nemati described the Olympic competition as a far more stressful experience than that of the Paralympics. Stepanova advanced to meet fellow Russian Ksenia Perova in the 1/16 elimination round, Stepanova defeating her compatriot in the all-Russian tie by seven set points to three to progress into the last sixteen.

==== 11 August ====
The elimination rounds concluded on 11 August. By reaching the last sixteen Ane Marcelle dos Santos achieved the host nation's highest ever finish in an Olympic archery competition achieving ninth place in the tournament's final standings. Naomi Folkard of Great Britain also achieved her personal best in reaching the quarter-finals on her fourth attempt. The quarter-finals also saw a major upset with the elimination of world number one Choi to the eighth seed Alejandra Valencia of Mexico, the Mexican winning in straight sets. Choi failed to recover after scoring only a five with her first arrow of the match, commenting afterwards that "I couldn't focus on myself today."

Choi's teammates Chang and Ki each won in their brackets to meet in the semifinals. As the defending champion Ki was the favourite to advance to the final, but Chang overcame a poor start - which included scoring a three with her second arrow - to win in five sets and progress to the final, ending Ki's hopes of becoming the first female archer to retain her individual Olympic title. Chang was joined in the gold medal match by Lisa Unruh of Germany, the reigning World Archery Indoor Champion. Unruh was a surprise finalist and later admitted she had had a disappointing ranking round in finishing 21st overall. Nevertheless, after three wins in the first three elimination rounds she defied expectations in the later rounds and defeated fourth-seed and world number two Tan Ya-ting in the quarter-finals and Alejandra Valencia in the semi-finals to reach the gold medal final.

=== Medal matches ===
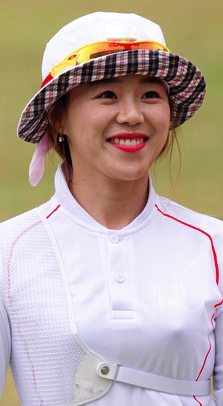
Chang Hye-jin (pictured at the 2014 Asian Games) won the gold medal after defeating Lisa Unruh in the final.

As the two losing semi-finalists, Ki met Valencia in the bronze medal match, the latter shooting for Mexico's first medal of the Games. Ki however prevailed in four sets to earn her fourth career Olympic medal, the second highest tally for a South Korean archer after Kim Soo-nyung's six medals won between 1988 and 2000. Valencia nevertheless earned her highest finishing position in a world competition to date with fourth overall.

In the gold medal final Chang and Unruh each started well, winning one of the opening two sets apiece. Chang won the third set after Unruh faltered by shooting a seven, claiming the fourth set shortly afterwards by scoring two tens and a nine that Unruh could not overcome, earning Chang the victory and her first Olympic medal. The Associated Press praised Chang as a "pillar of consistency" amid wind gusts that made aiming difficult.

Chang's win was her second gold medal of the 2016 Olympics following South Korea's success in the women's team competition earlier in the week; she became the eighth female South Korean archer to win an Olympic gold medal in an individual event. It was also South Korea's third gold medal of the Games and the nation's twenty-second Olympic archery gold medal overall, overtaking the twenty-one gold medals earned in short track speed skating at the Winter Olympics to become the country's most successful Olympic sport. Chang's two gold medals earned her the top female athlete prize at the 2016 Korea Woman Sports Awards.

Unruh's silver medal was Germany's first ever individual archery Olympic medal, and Germany's first archery medal since the German women's team won bronze at the 2000 Summer Olympics.

== Records ==
- 70 metres - 72 arrow ranking round

	Archer	Score	Location	Date	Ref
World record	Ki Bo-bae (KOR)	686	Gwangju, South Korea	4 July 2015	
Olympic record	Lina Herasymenko (UKR)	673	Atlanta, United States	28 July 1996	

The world record score for a 72-arrow round had been improved since the 2012 Summer Olympics, with Ki Bo-bae setting a new record score during the women's individual recurve event at the 2015 Summer Universiade in Gwangju. Ki's total of 686 surpassed the previous highest tally set by compatriot Park Sung-hyun by four points, breaking a record that had stood for more than 10 years. The Olympic record score of 673 was set by Ukraine's Lina Herasymenko at the 1996 Summer Olympics and was later matched by Park at the 2008 Summer Olympics.

Neither record was broken at the 2016 Olympics.

== Results ==
=== Ranking round ===
Rank	Archer	Half		Score	10s	Xs
Rank	Archer	1st	2nd	Score	10s	Xs
1	Choi Mi-sun (KOR)	334	335	669	32	16
2	Chang Hye-jin (KOR)	336	330	666	31	7
3	Ki Bo-bae (KOR)	329	334	663	33	14
4	Tan Ya-ting (TPE)	332	324	656	32	10
5	Tuyana Dashidorzhieva (RUS)	322	332	654	32	6
6	Wu Jiaxin (CHN)	325	328	653	25	10
7	Lucilla Boari (ITA)	325	326	651	27	11
8	Alejandra Valencia (MEX)	328	323	651	22	7
9	Lin Shih-chia (TPE)	326	325	651	21	6
10	Kaori Kawanaka (JPN)	319	331	650	27	7
11	Qi Yuhong (CHN)	327	322	649	25	5
12	Gabriela Bayardo (MEX)	323	325	648	25	6
13	Guendalina Sartori (ITA)	323	325	648	21	9
14	Taru Kuoppa (FIN)	316	327	643	24	10
15	Kang Un-ju (PRK)	327	316	643	22	8
16	Inna Stepanova (RUS)	322	321	643	19	8
17	Ksenia Perova (RUS)	315	326	641	24	5
18	Ana Rendón (COL)	326	315	641	23	7
19	Mackenzie Brown (USA)	321	320	641	22	9
20	Deepika Kumari (IND)	329	311	640	24	10
21	Lisa Unruh (GER)	315	325	640	24	7
22	Alexandra Longová (SVK)	318	322	640	19	8
23	Naomi Folkard (GBR)	322	317	639	25	8
24	Bombayla Devi Laishram (IND)	327	311	638	23	7
25	Yasemin Ecem Anagöz (TUR)	320	318	638	21	6
26	Ane Marcelle dos Santos (BRA)	329	308	637	24	7
27	Alexandra Mîrca (MDA)	321	315	636	23	8
28	Cao Hui (CHN)	325	306	631	16	6
29	Anastasia Pavlova (UKR)	319	311	630	24	6
30	Veronika Marchenko (UKR)	316	314	630	21	6
31	Lidiia Sichenikova (UKR)	319	311	630	21	2
32	Adriana Martín (ESP)	315	315	630	17	6
33	Le Chien-ying (TPE)	318	307	625	20	7
34	Khatuna Narimanidze (GEO)	314	311	625	20	6
35	Laura Nurmsalu (EST)	312	313	625	16	6
36	Luiza Saidiyeva (KAZ)	316	309	625	12	3
37	Olga Senyuk (AZE)	311	312	623	18	3
38	Aída Román (MEX)	313	310	623	15	7
39	Saori Nagamine (JPN)	313	308	621	18	4
40	Karina Lipiarska-Pałka (POL)	308	312	620	10	4
41	Laurence Baldauff (AUT)	313	306	619	16	3
42	Ika Yuliana Rochmawati (INA)	315	302	617	15	2
43	Laxmirani Majhi (IND)	306	308	614	13	3
44	Leidys Brito (VEN)	309	305	614	9	3
45	Kristine Esebua (GEO)	301	311	612	20	5
46	Claudia Mandia (ITA)	307	305	612	19	6
47	Christine Bjerendal (SWE)	305	306	611	11	3
48	Natalia Sánchez (COL)	314	295	609	16	6
49	Zahra Nemati (IRI)	305	304	609	12	4
50	Sarah Nikitin (BRA)	305	304	609	11	3
51	San Yu Htwe (MYA)	306	302	608	16	8
52	Carolina Aguirre (COL)	299	306	605	13	4
53	Shamoli Ray (BAN)	303	297	600	11	4
54	Marina Canetta (BRA)	303	296	599	14	2
55	Evangelia Psarra (GRE)	313	283	596	12	4
56	Reem Mansour (EGY)	300	296	596	12	3
57	Yuliya Lobzhenidze (GEO)	306	288	594	12	4
58	Alice Ingley (AUS)	304	289	593	9	1
59	Yuki Hayashi (JPN)	298	293	591	7	5
60	Karma (BHU)	300	288	588	9	0
61	Georcy-Stéphanie Picard (CAN)	297	288	585	11	1
62	Shehzana Anwar (KEN)	290	289	579	9	2
63	Lusitania Tatafu (TGA)	276	283	559	10	3
64	Yessica Camilo (DOM)	275	250	525	5	1

=== Elimination rounds ===
==== Section 1 ====
1/32 eliminations
1	M-s Choi (KOR)	6	28	27	28
64	Y Camilo (DOM)	0	20	23	25
33	C-y Le (TPE)	6	25	28	27	27
32	A Martín (ESP)	2	27	26	25	26
17	K Perova (RUS)	6	26	25	28	27	24
48	N Sánchez (COL)	4	25	29	19	27	24
49	Z Nemati (IRI)	2	21	28	26	26
16	I Stepanova (RUS)	6	28	27	28	27
9	S-c Lin (TPE)	6	28	26	25
56	R Mansour (EGY)	0	17	21	17
41	L Baldauff (AUT)	2	27	23	23	24
24	BD Laishram (IND)	6	24	28	27	25
25	YE Anagöz (TUR)	6^{9}	26	23	22	30	26
40	K Lipiarska-Pałka (POL)	5^{6}	22	23	23	27	27
57	Y Lobzhenidze (GEO)	4	28	28	26	27	27
8	A Valencia (MEX)	6	25	27	27	28	29

1/16 eliminations
1	M-s Choi (KOR)	6	29	28	29	27
33	C-y Le (TPE)	2	29	26	28	27
17	K Perova (RUS)	3	25	27	24	29	26
16	I Stepanova (RUS)	7	26	26	30	29	27
9	S-c Lin (TPE)	2	24	24	27	26
24	BD Laishram (IND)	6	27	27	26	28
25	YE Anagöz (TUR)	5^{9}	28	26	28	28	26
8	A Valencia (MEX)	6^{10}	28	28	28	27	26

1/8 eliminations
1	M-s Choi (KOR)	7	27	27	28	28	28
16	I Stepanova (RUS)	3	26	29	27	28	27
24	BD Laishram (IND)	2	26	26	27	23
8	A Valencia (MEX)	6	28	23	28	25

Quarter-finals
1	M-s Choi (KOR)	0	23	26	27
8	A Valencia (MEX)	6	25	29	29

==== Section 2 ====
1/32 eliminations
5	T Dashidorzhieva (RUS)	7	26	28	26	27	28
60	Karma (BHU)	3	26	22	26	27	21
37	O Senyuk (AZE)	1	23	25	23	26
28	H Cao (CHN)	7	28	25	24	27
21	L Unruh (GER)	6	28	27	22	27	27
44	L Brito (VEN)	4	25	25	24	28	24
53	S Ray (BAN)	0	27	23	25
12	G Bayardo (MEX)	6	28	28	28
13	G Sartori (ITA)	6	29	27	28
52	C Aguirre (COL)	0	24	23	25
45	K Esebua (GEO)	4	26	29	27	29	29
20	D Kumari (IND)	6	27	29	30	27	29
29	A Pavlova (UKR)	6	28	29	29
36	L Saidiyeva (KAZ)	0	22	26	24
61	G-S Picard (CAN)	1	27	25	26	24
4	Y-t Tan (TPE)	7	29	26	26	28

1/16 eliminations
5	T Dashidorzhieva (RUS)	4	28	25	28	25	29
28	H Cao (CHN)	6	28	29	27	27	29
21	L Unruh (GER)	6	29	27	26	25	28
12	G Bayardo (MEX)	4	27	26	27	27	26
13	G Sartori (ITA)	2	27	26	26	27
20	D Kumari (IND)	6	24	29	28	28
29	A Pavlova (UKR)	0	26	27	25
4	Y-t Tan (TPE)	6	27	29	29

1/8 eliminations
28	H Cao (CHN)	2	27	26	29	26
21	L Unruh (GER)	6	28	29	28	29
20	D Kumari (IND)	0	27	26	27
4	Y-t Tan (TPE)	6	28	29	30

Quarter-finals
21	L Unruh (GER)	6^{9}	25	28	27	28	26
4	Y-t Tan (TPE)	5^{7}	27	26	28	26	26

==== Section 3 ====
1/32 eliminations
3	B-b Ki (KOR)	7	26	26	26	27
62	S Anwar (KEN)	1	24	23	26	26
35	L Nurmsalu (EST)	0	22	23	21
30	V Marchenko (UKR)	6	27	25	26
19	M Brown (USA)	6	26	29	28	28	28
46	C Mandia (ITA)	4	27	29	26	28	22
51	SY Htwe (MYA)	7	26	26	26	27	27
14	T Kuoppa (FIN)	3	25	28	26	25	25
11	Y Qi (CHN)	7	28	27	28	30
54	M Canetta (BRA)	1	25	27	25	26
43	L Majhi (IND)	1	25	26	26	24
22	A Longová (SVK)	7	27	28	26	27
27	A Mîrca (MDA)	6	27	25	28	26	27
38	A Román (MEX)	4	25	29	25	26	27
59	Y Hayashi (JPN)	1	22	24	25	27
6	J Wu (CHN)	7	22	28	27	28

1/16 eliminations
3	B-b Ki (KOR)	6	29	27	29	29
30	V Marchenko (UKR)	2	27	27	29	25
19	M Brown (USA)	3	26	26	26	26	25
51	SY Htwe (MYA)	7	26	28	30	25	27
11	Y Qi (CHN)	6	29	28	27
22	A Longová (SVK)	0	27	26	24
27	A Mîrca (MDA)	0	25	23	24
6	J Wu (CHN)	6	26	25	27

1/8 eliminations
3	B-b Ki (KOR)	6	27	29	29
51	SY Htwe (MYA)	0	26	17	27
11	Y Qi (CHN)	5^{8}	25	27	28	27	28
6	J Wu (CHN)	6^{10}	26	29	28	26	27

Quarter-finals
3	B-b Ki (KOR)	6	28	25	27	29
6	J Wu (CHN)	2	27	28	22	26

==== Section 4 ====
1/32 eliminations
7	L Boari (ITA)	1	25	25	22	20
58	A Ingley (AUS)	7	25	28	23	24
39	S Nagamine (JPN)	3	28	25	19	25	19
26	AM dos Santos (BRA)	7	27	29	24	25	22
23	N Folkard (GBR)	6^{9}	28	27	29	24	27
42	IY Rochmawati (INA)	5^{7}	27	25	29	26	28
55	E Psarra (GRE)	3	25	26	27	25	25
10	K Kawanaka (JPN)	7	25	29	26	26	29
15	U-j Kang (PRK)	6	25	25	27
50	S Nikitin (BRA)	0	24	23	22
47	C Bjerendal (SWE)	6	25	25	26	28
18	A Rendón (COL)	2	27	24	24	27
31	L Sichenikova (UKR)	7	25	25	27	28
34	K Narimanidze (GEO)	1	25	24	24	27
63	L Tatafu (TGA)	0	23	15	23
2	H-j Chang (KOR)	6	28	27	27

1/16 eliminations
58	A Ingley (AUS)	0	23	24	24
26	AM dos Santos (BRA)	6	25	26	26
23	N Folkard (GBR)	6	26	28	29
10	K Kawanaka (JPN)	0	22	26	26
15	U-j Kang (PRK)	6	25	26	25	27
47	C Bjerendal (SWE)	2	26	25	23	25
31	L Sichenikova (UKR)	2	27	28	28	25
2	H-j Chang (KOR)	6	28	29	26	28

1/8 eliminations
26	AM dos Santos (BRA)	2	25	27	25	20
23	N Folkard (GBR)	6	27	27	25	25
15	U-j Kang (PRK)	2	27	24	27	27
2	H-j Chang (KOR)	6	27	28	29	27

Quarter-finals
23	N Folkard (GBR)	1	25	27	27	27
2	H-j Chang (KOR)	7	26	27	28	28

- Note: A superscript denotes a win from a one-arrow shoot-off

=== Finals ===
Semi-finals
8	Alejandra Valencia (MEX)	2	26	26	25	26
21	Lisa Unruh (GER)	6	27	28	23	27
3	Ki Bo-bae (KOR)	3	25	24	24	26	26
2	Chang Hye-jin (KOR)	7	19	27	27	26	28

Gold medal match
21	Lisa Unruh (GER) (silver)	2	26	28	26	27
2	Chang Hye-jin (KOR) (gold)	6	27	26	27	29
Bronze medal match
8	Alejandra Valencia (MEX)	4	25	29	25	27	25
3	Ki Bo-bae (KOR) (bronze)	6	26	28	26	21	30
