= Qi Yuhong =

Chinese archer (born 1989)

Personal information
- Full name: Qi Yuhong
- Born: 25 August 1989 (age 36) Shanghai, China
- Height: 1.66 m (5 ft 5 in)
- Weight: 78 kg (172 lb)

Sport
- Country: China
- Sport: Archery
- Event: Recurve
Medal record
Women's recurve archery
Representing China
Asian Championships
Bronze medal – third place	2015 Bangkok	Team
- Updated on 27 February 2017

Qi Yuhong (Chinese: 齐玉红; pinyin: Qí Yùhóng; born 25 August 1989) is a Chinese competitive archer. She won a bronze medal as a member of the Chinese women's archery team at the 2015 Asian Championships in Bangkok, Thailand, and eventually finished as one of the top 16 finalists in the individual recurve tournament at the 2016 Summer Olympics.

Qi was selected to compete for the Chinese squad at the 2016 Summer Olympics in Rio de Janeiro, shooting in both individual and team recurve tournaments. She opened the tournament by discharging 649 points, 20 perfect tens, and 5 bull's eyes to seal the eleventh seed heading to the knockout draw from the classification round, along with her trio's cumulative score of 1,933. In the women's team recurve, Qi and her younger compatriots Cao Hui and Wu Jiaxin directly advanced to the quarterfinals as the third-seeded squad, but they were eliminated early by the Italian women in a shocking 3–5 match. In the women's individual recurve, Qi bounced back from the trio's quarterfinal exit to reach the top sixteen round by disposing Brazil's home favorite Marina Canetta (7–1) and Slovakia's Alexandra Longová. However, she narrowly missed the quarterfinal match in a tough 6–5 shoot-off from her younger teammate Wu.
