= Archery at the 2014 South American Games =

- Venue: Parque Deportivo Peñalolén
- Dates: 12–15 March

Archery at the 2014 South American Games was held at the Parque Deportivo Peñalolén in Santiago, Chile from March 12 to 15. Five competitions were held in men, women and mixed recurve.

== Medal summary ==
=== Medal table ===
Rank	Nation	Gold	Silver	Bronze	Total
1	Brazil (BRA)	3	1	1	5
2	Colombia (COL)	2	2	2	6
3	Venezuela (VEN)	0	1	1	2
4	Argentina (ARG)	0	1	0	1
5	Chile (CHI)	0	0	1	1
Totals (5 entries)		5	5	5	15

=== Medalists ===
Event	Gold	Silver	Bronze
Men's individual	Marcus D'Almeida (BRA)	Fabián Cárdenas (ARG)	Andrés Pila (COL)
Men's team	Brazil; Marcos Bortoloto; Marcus D'Almeida; Daniel Xavier	Colombia; Daniel Pacheco; Andrés Pila; Daniel Pineda	Chile; Andrés Aguilar; Guillermo Aguilar; Cristóbal Barra
Women's individual	Ana Rendón (COL)	Maira Sepúlveda (COL)	Sarah Nikitin (BRA)
Women's team	Colombia; Ana Rendón; Natalia Sánchez; Maira Sepúlveda	Brazil; Marina Canetta; Sarah Nikitin; Ane Marcelle dos Santos	Venezuela; Leidys Brito; Vanessa Chacón; Mayra Méndez
Mixed team	Brazil; Marcus D'Almeida; Sarah Nikitin	Venezuela; Elías Malavé; Leidys Brito	Colombia; Andrés Pila; Ana Rendón

== Participating nations ==
A total of 41 archers from 8 nations competed in archery at the 2014 South American Games:

- Argentina (7)
- Brazil (6)
- Chile (7)
- Colombia (7)
- Ecuador (3)
- Peru (2)
- Uruguay (1)
- Venezuela (8)
