= Archery at the 2016 Summer Olympics – Women's team =

Women's team at the Games of the XXXI Olympiad
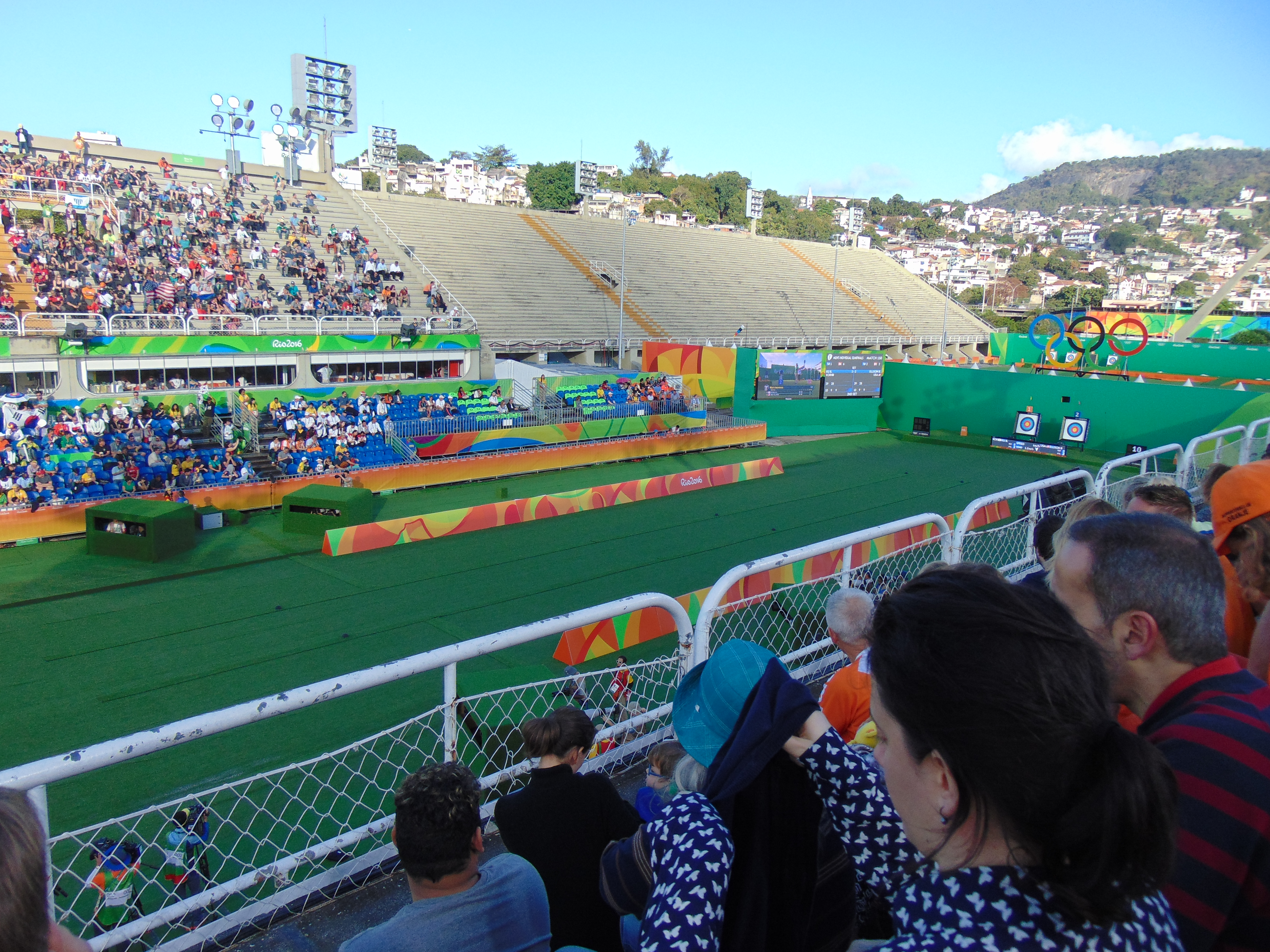
- The Sambadrome, where the event took place, during the 2016 Summer Olympics
- Venue: Sambadrome Marquês de Sapucaí
- Date: 7 August 2016
- Competitors: 36 from 12 nations

Medalists
1st place, gold medalist(s)		Chang Hye-jin; Choi Mi-sun; Ki Bo-bae	South Korea
2nd place, silver medalist(s)		Tuyana Dashidorzhieva; Ksenia Perova; Inna Stepanova	Russia
3rd place, bronze medalist(s)		Le Chien-ying; Lin Shih-chia; Tan Ya-ting	Chinese Taipei

The women's team archery event was one of 4 archery events at the 2016 Summer Olympics.

== Competition format ==
As with the other archery events, the women's team was a recurve archery event, held under the World Archery-approved 70-meter distance and rules. 12 teams of 3 archers each participated. Competition began with a ranking round, in which each archer shot 72 arrows (this was the same ranking round used for the individual event). The combined scores from the ranking round were used to seed the teams into a single-elimination bracket, with the top 4 teams receiving a bye into the second round (quarterfinals). Each match consisted of four sets of 6 arrows, two per archer. The team with the highest score in the set – the total of the six arrows – receives two set points; if the teams are tied, each receives one set point. The first team to five set points wins the match.

== Schedule ==
All times are Brasília Time (UTC−3).

Day	Date	Start	Finish	Event	Phase
Day 2	Sunday 7 August 2016	9:00	17:45	Women's team	Eliminations/Medal round

== Records ==
Prior to this competition, the existing world and Olympic records were as follows.

- 216 arrow ranking round

World record	South Korea; Choi Mi-sun, Ki Bo-bae, Chang Hye-jin	2015	Antalya, Turkey	14 June 2015
Olympic record	South Korea; Park Sung-hyun, Yun Ok-hee, Joo Hyun-jung	2004	Beijing, China	9 August 2008

== Results ==
=== Ranking round ===
Rank	Nation	Archer	Score	10s	Xs
1	South Korea	Chang Hye-jin; Choi Mi-sun; Ki Bo-bae	1998	59	37
2	Russia	Tuyana Dashidorzhieva; Ksenia Perova; Inna Stepanova	1938	56	19
3	China	Cao Hui; Qi Yuhong; Wu Jiaxin	1933	45	21
4	Chinese Taipei	Le Chien-ying; Lin Shih-chia; Tan Ya-ting	1932	50	23
5	Mexico	Gabriela Bayardo; Aída Román; Alejandra Valencia	1922	42	20
6	Italy	Lucilla Boari; Claudia Mandia; Guendalina Sartori	1911	41	26
7	India	Deepika Kumari; Bombayla Devi Laishram; Laxmirani Majhi	1892	40	20
8	Ukraine	Veronika Marchenko; Anastasia Pavlova; Lidiia Sichenikova	1890	52	14
9	Japan	Yuki Hayashi; Kaori Kawanaka; Saori Nagamine	1862	36	16
10	Colombia	Carolina Aguirre; Ana Rendón; Natalia Sánchez	1855	35	17
11	Brazil	Marina Canetta; Ane Marcelle dos Santos; Sarah Nikitin	1845	37	12
12	Georgia	Kristine Esebua; Yuliya Lobzhenidze; Khatuna Narimanidze	1831	37	15

=== Competition bracket ===
1/8 eliminations
9	Japan	6	53	55	54	55
8	Ukraine	2	54	54	53	53
5	Mexico	6	54	58	57
12	Georgia	0	50	52	55
11	Brazil	0	50	42	55
6	Italy	6	54	53	56
7	India	5	52	49	52	52
10	Colombia	3	51	50	52	44

Quarterfinals
1	South Korea	5	54	57	55
9	Japan	1	54	51	54
5	Mexico	4	51	55	52	52	25
4	Chinese Taipei	5	50	50	53	56	26
3	China	3	52	48	55	50
6	Italy	5	52	49	47	53
7	India	4	48	53	53	54	23
2	Russia	5	55	52	50	55	25

Semifinals
1	South Korea	5	60	53	56
4	Chinese Taipei	1	50	53	52
6	Italy	3	54	52	50	49
2	Russia	5	54	47	52	52

Gold medal match
1	South Korea	5	58	55	51
2	Russia	1	49	51	51
Bronze Medal Match
4	Chinese Taipei	5	56	55	49	56
6	Italy	3	52	54	51	56
