= Sarah Nikitin =

Brazilian recurve archer (born 1988)

Personal information
- Full name: Sarah de Oliveira Nikitin
- Born: 27 December 1988 (age 37) São Paulo, Brazil
- Height: 1.70 m (5 ft 7 in)
- Weight: 75 kg (165 lb)

Sport
- Country: Brazil
- Sport: Archery
- Event: Recurve
- Club: São Paulo SP
- Coached by: Evandro Azevedo (national)
Medal record
Women's archery
Representing Brazil
South American Games
Gold medal – first place	2014 Santiago	Mixed team
Silver medal – second place	2014 Santiago	Team
Bronze medal – third place	2014 Santiago	Individual
Military World Games
Bronze medal – third place	2015 Mungyeong	Mixed team
- Updated on 1 March 2017

Sarah de Oliveira Nikitin (born 27 December 1988) is a Brazilian competitive archer. Nikitin was a member of Brazil's archery squad in three editions of the Pan American Games (2007, 2011, and 2015). At the 2016 Summer Olympics, Nikitin scored her only career medal with a bronze over Venezuela's Leidys Brito in the women's individual recurve tournament at the 2014 South American Games in Santiago, Chile. Nikitin currently trains under the tutelage of head coach Evandro Azevedo for the Brazilian national squad, while shooting at a local archery range in her native São Paulo.

Nikitin was selected by the Brazilian Olympic Committee to compete for the host nation's archery squad at the 2016 Summer Olympics in Rio de Janeiro, shooting in both individual and team recurve tournaments. First, Nikitin discharged 609 points, 8 perfect tens, and 3 bull's eyes to take the fiftieth seed heading to the knockout draw from the classification round, along with the trio's cumulative score of 1,845. Sitting at eleventh in the team recurve, Nikitin and her compatriots Ane Marcelle dos Santos and Marina Canetta put up a gallant fight amid the loud applause of their parochial crowd, but bowed out of the opening round match to the Italians in straight sets 0–6. In the women's individual recurve, Nikitin was unable to overthrow North Korea's Kang Un-ju early in the opening round match that abruptly ended her Olympic debut in a severe 0–6 defeat.
