= Archery at the 2015 Military World Games =

- Venues: Yecheon Jinho International Archery Field
- Dates: 5 – 9 October

Archery competitions at the 2015 Military World Games were held in Mungyeong, South Korea from 5 to 9 October 2015.

== Medal summary ==
=== Medalists ===
==== Recurve ====
| Event | Gold | Silver | Bronze |
|---|---|---|---|
| Men's individual | Shin Jae-hun; South Korea | Mauro Nespoli; Italy | Koo Dae-han; South Korea |
| Disabled men's individual | Romaios Roumeliotis; Greece | Michael Lukow; United States | Fabio Tomasulo; Italy |
| Men's team | South Korea (KOR); Kim Joo-wan; Kim Sung-hun; Shin Jae-hun | China (CHN); Liu Xuanran; Meng Han; Qi Kaiyao | India (IND); Raj Vakil; Bulbul Marandi; Atul Verma |
| Disabled men's team | France (FRA); Eric Baudrit; Sebastien David; Raphael Perriraz | Netherlands (NED); Paul Gommers; Roger Hack; Wesley van den Wildenberg | Germany (GER); Jens Engelke; Martin Neugebauer; Stefan Paschetag |
| Women's individual | Guendalina Sartori; Italy | Zhang Binghong; China | Alena Kuzniatsova; Belarus |
| Women's team | Italy (ITA); Pia Lionetti; Guendalina Sartori; Elena Tonetta | Mongolia (MGL); Urantungalag Bishindee; Miroslava Danzandorj; Ariunbileg Nyamjargal | Belarus (BLR); Karyna Dziominskaya; Alena Kuzniatsova; Ekaterina Timofeyeva |
| Mixed team | Mongolia (MGL); Miroslava Danzandorj; Otgonbold Baatarkhuyag | China (CHN); Zhang Binghong; Qi Kaiyao | Brazil (BRA); Sarah Nikitin; Bernardo Oliveira |

=== Medal standings ===
| Rank | Nation | Gold | Silver | Bronze | Total |
|---|---|---|---|---|---|
| 1 | Italy (ITA) | 2 | 1 | 1 | 4 |
| 2 | South Korea (KOR) | 2 | 0 | 1 | 3 |
| 3 | Mongolia (MGL) | 1 | 1 | 0 | 2 |
| 4 | France (FRA) | 1 | 0 | 0 | 1 |
| 4 | Greece (GRE) | 1 | 0 | 0 | 1 |
| 6 | China (CHN) | 0 | 3 | 0 | 3 |
| 7 | Netherlands (NED) | 0 | 1 | 0 | 1 |
| 7 | United States (USA) | 0 | 1 | 0 | 1 |
| 9 | Belarus (BLR) | 0 | 0 | 2 | 2 |
| 10 | Brazil (BRA) | 0 | 0 | 1 | 1 |
| 10 | Germany (GER) | 0 | 0 | 1 | 1 |
| 10 | India (IND) | 0 | 0 | 1 | 1 |
| Totals (12 entries) | | 7 | 7 | 7 | 21 |
