= Yessica Camilo =

Dominican Republic archer (born 1993)

Personal information
- Full name: Yessica Camilo González
- Born: 23 February 1993 (age 33) Santo Domingo, Dominican; Republic
- Height: 1.68 m (5 ft 6 in)
- Weight: 73 kg (161 lb)

Sport
- Country: Dominican Republic
- Sport: Archery
- Event: Recurve
- Updated on 4 March 2017

Yessica Camilo González (Note: In this Spanish name, the first or paternal surname is Camilo and the second or maternal family name is González.) (born 23 December 1993) is a competitive archer from the Dominican Republic.

At the 2016 Summer Olympics in Rio de Janeiro, Camilo etched a historic mark for her country to compete in an Olympic tournament, shooting only in the women's individual recurve. Heading to the knockout stage as the lowest-ranked archer of the 64-female field with a score of 525 points, 4 perfect tens, and single bull's eye, Camilo lost her opening round match to the top-seeded South Korean and team recurve champion Choi Mi-sun, who comfortably dispatched her from the tournament with an easy 6–0 score.
