= Lusitania Tatafu =

Tongan recurve archer (born 1998)

Personal information
- Full name: Karoline Lusitania Tatafu
- Nickname: Lusi
- Born: 20 February 1998 (age 28)
- Height: 1.76 m (5 ft 9 1/2 in)
- Weight: 70 kg (150 lb)

Sport
- Country: Tonga
- Sport: Archery
- Event: Recurve
- Updated on 26 July 2016

Karoline Lusitania "Lusi" Tatafu (born 20 February 1998) is a Tongan recurve archer who competed at the 2014 Summer Youth Olympics and the 2016 Summer Olympics.

Tatafu made her international debut at the 2012 New Zealand National Championships, and was awarded a universality place to compete at the 2014 Summer Youth Olympics. In 2015 she achieved a silver medal at the New Zealand National Championships, and the following year made her senior Olympic debut at the 2016 Summer Olympics, participating in the women's individual event. She finished the 72-arrow ranking round in 63rd position out of 64 and was eliminated by South Korea's Chang Hye-jin in the event's first knock-out round.
