= Saori Nagamine =

Japanese archer (born 1993)

Personal information
- Full name: Saori Nagamine
- Nickname: Nagami
- Born: 5 July 1993 (age 32) Nagasaki, Japan
- Height: 1.66 m (5 ft 5 in)
- Weight: 60 kg (132 lb)

Sport
- Country: Japan
- Sport: Archery
- Event: Recurve
- Updated on 1 March 2017

Saori Nagamine (永峰 沙織, Nagamine Saori; born 5 July 1993) is a Japanese competitive archer. A member of Japan women's archery squad at the 2016 Summer Olympics, Nagamine has collected a career total of three medals (one gold and two bronze) in a major international competition, spanning the World University Championships and the World Cup series.

Nagamine was selected by the Japanese Olympic Committee to compete at the 2016 Summer Olympics in Rio de Janeiro, shooting only in both individual and team recurve tournaments. First, Nagamine discharged 621 points, 14 perfect tens, and 4 bull's eyes to seal the thirty-ninth seed heading to the knockout draw from the classification round, along with the trio's cumulative score of 1,862. Sitting at ninth in the team recurve, Nagamine, along with her compatriots Yuki Hayashi and London 2012 bronze medalist Kaori Kawanaka, took a convincing 6–2 victory over Ukraine in the opening round match, before they challenged the eventual champion South Korea for the quarterfinals, which effected the trio's untimely departure from the tournament at 1–5. In the women's individual recurve, Nagamine could not overcome Brazil's home favorite Ane Marcelle dos Santos from the opening round by the loud applause of her opponent's parochial crowd, abruptly ending her Olympic debut in a 3–7 defeat.
