= 2015 Asian Archery Championships =

International archery tournament

- Host city: Bangkok, Thailand
- Dates: 3–8 November 2015

The 2015 Asian Archery Championships were the 19th edition of the event, and were held in Bangkok, Thailand from 3 to 8 November 2015. This acted as a qualifying tournament for the 2016 Summer Olympics.

== Medal summary ==
=== Recurve ===
Event	Gold	Silver	Bronze
Men's individual	Lee Woo-seok; South Korea	Lee Seung-yun; South Korea	Im Dong-hyun; South Korea
Men's team	South Korea; Im Dong-hyun; Lee Seung-yun; Lee Woo-seok	Japan; Yuki Kawata; Hideki Kikuchi; Shungo Tabata	Chinese Taipei; Peng Shih-cheng; Wang Hou-chieh; Wei Chun-heng
Women's individual	Chang Hye-jin; South Korea	Hong Su-nam; South Korea	Lee Tuk-young; South Korea
Women's team	South Korea; Chang Hye-jin; Hong Su-nam; Lee Tuk-young	India; Deepika Kumari; Bombayla Devi Laishram; Laxmirani Majhi	China; Cao Hui; Qi Yuhong; Xu Jing
Mixed team	Chinese Taipei; Wei Chun-heng; Lei Chien-ying	South Korea; Lee Woo-seok; Chang Hye-jin	India; Jayanta Talukdar; Deepika Kumari

=== Compound ===
Event	Gold	Silver	Bronze
Men's individual	Rajat Chauhan; India	Choi Yong-hee; South Korea	Esmaeil Ebadi; Iran
Men's team	India; Rajat Chauhan; Sarvesh Pareek; Abhishek Verma	South Korea; Choi Yong-hee; Kim Jong-ho; Yang Young-ho	Iran; Yaser Amouei; Esmaeil Ebadi; Majid Gheidi
Women's individual	Jyothi Surekha; India	Afsaneh Shafiei; Iran	Wu Ting-ting; Chinese Taipei
Women's team	South Korea; Kim Yun-hee; Seol Da-yeong; Song Yun-soo	India; Swati Dudhwal; Jayalakshmi Sarikonda; Jyothi Surekha	Malaysia; Saritha Cham Nong; Nor Rizah Ishak; Fatin Nurfatehah Mat Salleh
Mixed team	South Korea; Kim Jong-ho; Song Yun-soo	Iran; Esmaeil Ebadi; Afsaneh Shafiei	Chinese Taipei; Kung Lin-hsiang; Chen Li-ju

== Medal table ==
Rank	Nation	Gold	Silver	Bronze	Total
1	South Korea	6	5	2	13
2	India	3	2	1	6
3	Chinese Taipei	1	0	3	4
4	Iran	0	2	2	4
5	Japan	0	1	0	1
6	China	0	0	1	1
6	Malaysia	0	0	1	1
Totals (7 entries)		10	10	10	30
