= Lucilla Boari =

Italian recurve archer (born 1997)

Personal information
- Born: 24 March 1997 (age 29) Mantua, Italy

Sport
- Country: Italy
- Sport: Archery
- Event: Recurve
Medal record
Women's recurve archery
Representing Italy
Olympic Games
Bronze medal – third place	2020 Tokyo	Individual
European Games
Gold medal – first place	2019 Minsk	Mixed team
Silver medal – second place	2019 Minsk	Individual
Bronze medal – third place	2023 Kraków-Małopolska	Team
European Indoor Championships
Gold medal – first place	2025 Samsun	Team
Silver medal – second place	2024 Varaždin	Team
Bronze medal – third place	2024 Varaždin	Individual
Mediterranean Games
Gold medal – first place	2018 Tarragona	Individual
Silver medal – second place	2022 Oran	Individual
Silver medal – second place	2022 Oran	Team
Silver medal – second place	2022 Oran	Mixed team
- Updated on 4 July 2022

Lucilla Boari (born 24 March 1997) is an Italian recurve archer who has represented Italy at the 2016 Summer Olympics and at the 2020 Summer Olympics. She has additionally competed for her country at the 2018 Mediterranean Games and the 2019 European Games, in which she won an individual gold and silver medal, respectively.

== Career ==
=== 2016 Summer Olympics ===
Boari secured two qualification spots for her country in the final world qualification tournament for the 2016 Summer Olympics, delivering the shot that claimed victory over Chinese Taipei to give Italy a full Olympic berth of three archers. Boari was subsequently chosen as part of the Italian squad alongside fellow Olympic debutants Claudia Mandia and Guendalina Sartori in July 2016.

At the Olympic Games the following month, Boari competed in the women's individual and women's team events. With teammates Mandia and Sartori, Boari successfully progressed to the semi-finals in the women's team competition, defeating the Brazilian and Chinese teams before losing to Russia. In the bronze medal match their opponents Chinese Taipei were too strong, and the Italian trio finished the competition in fourth place. Boari was however much less successful in the individual tournament, and after placing seventh in the ranking round lost to Australia's Alice Ingley in the opening elimination round.

=== 2018–2019: Post-Olympics ===
In June 2018, Boari won gold medal in the women's individual event at the Mediterranean Games, defeating the Spain's Mónica Galisteo Cruz in the final. The following year she competed in the European Games, where in the women's individual event she achieved the sixth seed in the 72-arrow ranking round before advancing through the elimination rounds to the gold medal final. She was defeated in the final by compatriot Tatiana Andreoli, earning the silver medal as runner-up.

=== 2020 Summer Olympics ===
In 2021, she won the bronze medal at the 2020 Summer Olympics in the women's individual event. At the same time, she came out as lesbian, revealing that Dutch archer Sanne de Laat is her girlfriend.
