= Laxmirani Majhi =

Indian archer (born 1989)

Personal information
- Born: 26 January 1989 (age 37) Bagula, Ghatshila, Jharkhand, India

Sport
- Country: India
- Sport: Archery
- Event: recurve
Medal record
Women's recurve archery
Representing India
World Championships
| Silver medal – second place | 2015 Copenhagen | Team |
Asian Championships
| Silver medal – second place | 2015 Bangkok | Team |
| Bronze medal – third place | 2005 New Delhi | Team |

Laxmirani Majhi (born 26 January 1989) is an Indian female right handed recurve archer.

== Early life ==
Laxmi is from the Santhal tribe; she grew up in Bagula village in East Singhbhum district, Jharkhand. Her first chance to become an archer was offered to her when the selectors for the archery academy visited her Government School. Laxmi work with Indian Railways in Bilaspur, Chhattisgarh

== Achievements ==
She competed in the individual recurve event and the 2015 World Archery Championships – She also finished 4th in the Individual Event, losing out on the bronze medal. In Women's team recurve event, she won the silver medal at the 2015 World Archery Championships in Copenhagen, Denmark.

She was the part of the team that qualified for 2016 Rio Olympics. The Indian women's recurve team, consisting of Laxmirani Majhi, Bombayla Devi Laishram and Deepika Kumari, finished 7th in the ranking round. The team won their match against Colombia in the round of 16 before losing the quarterfinal match against Russia.

In the individual event, she ranked 43rd in the ranking round. She then lost to Alexandra Longová of Slovakia in the round of 64.
