= Carolina Aguirre =

Colombian archer (born 1996)

Personal information
- Born: 29 January 1996 (age 30) Antioquia

Sport
- Country: Colombia
- Sport: Archery
- Event: Recurve
- Updated on 26 July 2016

Carolina Aguirre Giraldo (born 29 January 1996) is a Colombian recurve archer who competed at the 2016 Summer Olympics. She made her international debut at the fourth stage of the 2015 Archery World Cup in Medellín, and was later selected as the third member of the Colombian Olympic archery team.

Aguirre contested both the women's individual and women's team events at the Olympics in Rio de Janeiro. With teammates Ana Rendón and Natalia Sánchez she was eliminated by India in the 1/8 elimination stage of the team event after she scored poorly with her final arrow of the match. In the individual competition Aguirre finished the preliminary ranking round with 605 points from 720 to earn the 52nd seed for the subsequent knock-out stages, where she was defeated by Guendalina Sartori in the opening round.
