= Wu Jiaxin =

Chinese archer (born 1997)

Personal information
- Full name: Wu Jiaxin
- Born: 28 February 1997 (age 29) Shanghai, China
- Height: 1.64 m (5 ft 5 in)
- Weight: 72 kg (159 lb)

Sport
- Country: China
- Sport: Archery
- Event: Recurve
- Updated on 27 February 2017

Wu Jiaxin (Chinese: 吴佳欣; pinyin: Wú Jiāxīn; born February 28, 1997) is a Chinese competitive archer. She has won a career total of two medals, a silver and a bronze, on her international archery debut at the 2013 World Youth Championships in Wuxi, and eventually finished as a quarter-finalist in the individual recurve tournament at the 2016 Summer Olympics.

== Career ==
Wu was selected to compete for the Chinese squad at the 2016 Summer Olympics in Rio de Janeiro, shooting in both individual and team recurve tournaments. She opened the tournament by discharging 653 points, 15 perfect tens, and 10 bull's eyes to lead the Chinese women for the sixth seed heading to the knockout draw from the classification round, along with her trio's cumulative score of 1,933. In the women's team recurve, Wu and her compatriots Cao Hui and Qi Yuhong directly advanced to the quarterfinals as the third-seeded squad, but they were eliminated early by the Italian women in a shocking 3–5 match. Rebounding from the trio's quarterfinal exit, Wu successfully reached the top eight of the women's individual recurve by defeating Japan's Yuki Hayashi (7–1), Moldova's Alexandra Mîrca (6–0), and her teammate Qi through a tight shoot-off. However, she was unable to spoil South Korea's Ki Bo-bae from her Olympic title defense, culminating Wu's maiden Games in an unworthy 2–6 defeat.
