= Mackenzie Brown =

American archer (born 1995)

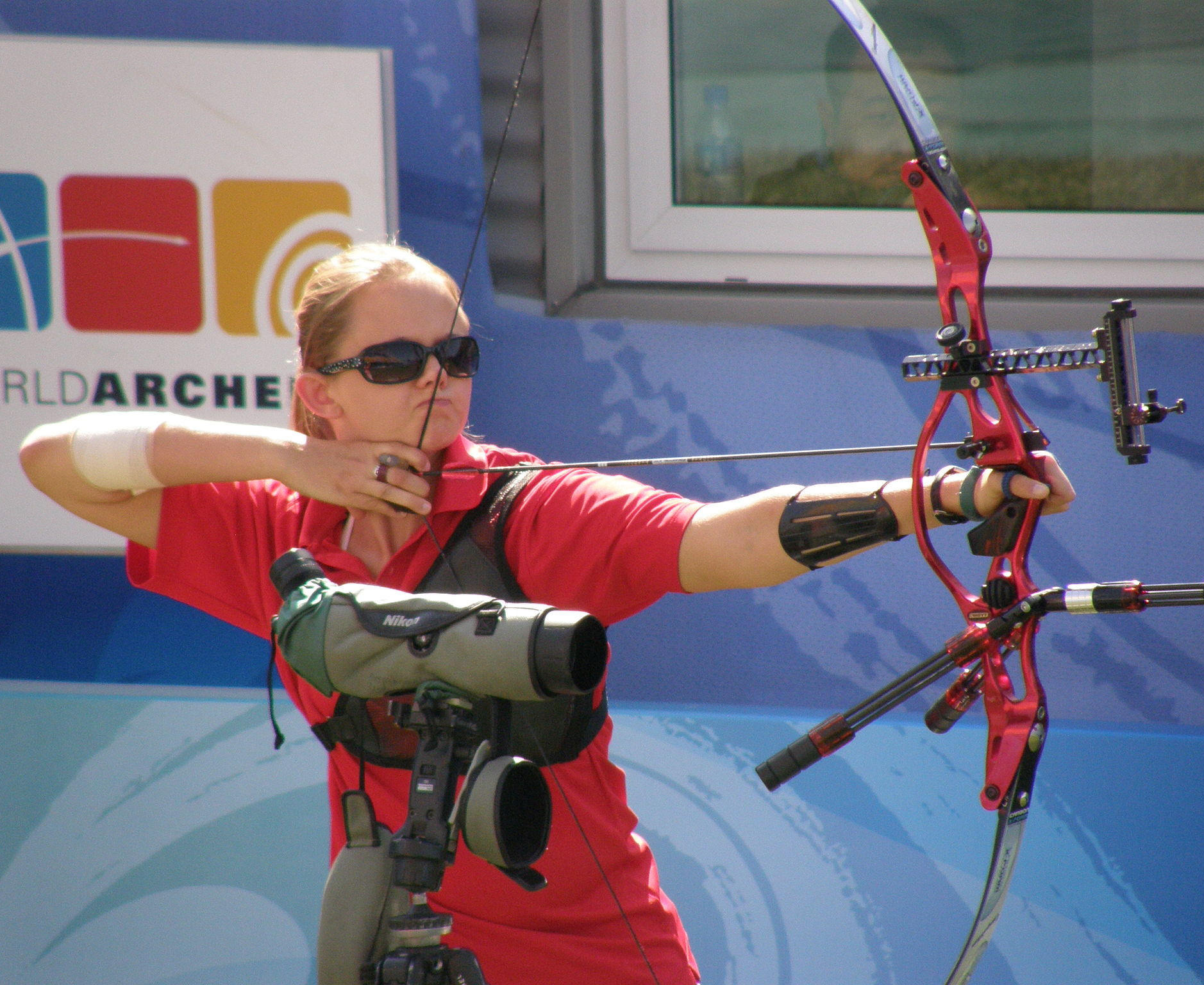
- Brown in 2015

Personal information
- Born: March 14, 1995 (age 31) Flint, Texas, U.S.
- Height: 177 cm (5 ft 10 in)
- Weight: 74 kg (163 lb)

Sport
- Sport: Archery
- Event: Recurve
Medal record
Women's recurve archery
Representing the United States
Pan American Championships
Gold medal – first place	2018 Medellín	Team
Gold medal – first place	2018 Medellín	Mixed team
Silver medal – second place	2018 Medellín	Individual

Mackenzie Yee Brown (born March 14, 1995) is an American archer. She represented the United States at the 2016 Summer Olympics in Rio de Janeiro as the USA's only female archer. She represented the United States again at the 2020 Summer Olympics in Tokyo.

== Early life ==
She was born in Flint, Texas, where she spent her childhood and grew up around bowhunting. She is the daughter of Stacey and Chuck Brown. She is an Evangelical Christian. As of summer 2016, she resides in Chula Vista, California where she is a Resident Athlete at the U.S. Olympic Training Center.

== Archery career ==
Prior to her archery career, she participated in competitive swimming, hoping to eventually swim at the Olympic games. In her mid-teens, she discovered the sport of archery and dedicated her time completely to the sport, participating in the National Archery in the Schools program. Brown later participated in the Junior Olympic Archery Development club and participated in the 2012 Olympic Trials for archery, placing 16th, but did not earn a spot to the 2012 Summer Olympics. She won a team silver medal at the 2012 Pan American Championships, won an individual silver medal at the 2015 World Youth Championships, won a team bronze medal at the 2014 Pan American Championships, and won an individual silver medal at the 2015 World Archery Youth Championships. As of August 2016, she is the fourth ranked female archer in the world. As a result, she was named the sole female member of the United States archery team at the 2016 Summer Olympics in Rio de Janeiro. In a major upset, Brown was defeated in the round of 32 of the women's individual event by Myanmar archer San Yu Htwe. She was nicknamed as the "Girl on Fire".

== Personal ==
Brown stated that she would not be getting a COVID-19 vaccine, and would not have participated at the 2020 Olympic Games had vaccination been mandatory.
