= Jayalakshmi Sarikonda =

Indian archer

Medal record

Women's compound archery

Representing India

Asian Championships
Silver medal – second place	2015 Bangkok	Team

Jayalakshmi Sarikonda (b. 19 August 1994 in Chandrapur, Maharashtra, India), is an Indian archer. She has competed internationally since 2008–present. Her nickname is Lakshmi.

== Early life ==
Lakshmi was originally a rifle shooter. At age 11 she turned to archery.

Her father is Sarikonda Trinadh (mining engineer) and Vani (teacher). Her sibling is Sarikonda Saisiddardh). She gives all the credit to her father.

== Career ==
She competes in the compound women event. She won medals in international archery events. She was part of the 2009 and 2013 bronze winning teams in the youth championships. Lakshmi was the youngest in the 2009 world championships. She won laurels for the nation in both senior and junior categories. Lakshmi was declared the most promising archer of 2009 by Sahara Indiapariwar. She received the Shiv Chatrapati award from the Maharastra government. She won the silver medal in the team event at the 2015 Asian archery championships. She was awarded the Women Of The Year Award 2012 by Dainik Bhaskar Group. She has displayed her talent on reality shows on Sony TV, Adhurs and Super on ETV Telugu, and ETV Kannada.
