= Taru Kuoppa =

Finnish archer (born 1983)

Personal information
- Full name: Taru Kuoppa
- Born: 14 November 1983 (age 42) Kouvola, Finland
- Height: 1.73 m (5 ft 8 in)
- Weight: 63 kg (139 lb)

Sport
- Country: Finland
- Sport: Archery
- Event: Recurve
- Club: Lahden Vasama
- Coached by: Perttu Ronkanen
- Updated on 24 February 2017

Taru Kuoppa (born 14 November 1983) is a Finnish competitive archer. A member of the Finnish elite archery team since 2013, Kuoppa came close to her maiden podium triumph in the international scene, finishing fourth with her partner Antti Tekoniemi in the mixed team recurve at the 2014 European Championships in Yerevan, Armenia. Kuoppa currently trains at Lahden Vasama Archery Club in Lahti, under the tutelage of her coach Perttu Ronkanen.

Kuoppa was selected to compete for Finland in the women's individual recurve at the 2016 Summer Olympics in Rio de Janeiro, Brazil. Sitting at fourteenth from the classification stage of the competition with a score of 643 points, 14 perfect tens and 10 bull's eyes, Kuoppa was knocked out of the first round in an upset 3–7 performance by the unheralded Burmese archer San Yu Htwe.
