= 2019 Asian Archery Championships =

Sports competitions in Bangkok, Thailand

- Host city: Bangkok, Thailand
- Dates: 22–28 November 2019

The 2019 Asian Archery Championships were the 21st edition of the event, and were held in Bangkok, Thailand from 22 to 28 November 2019.

== Medal summary ==
=== Recurve ===
| Event | Gold | Silver | Bronze |
|---|---|---|---|
| Men's individual | Lee Woo-seok; South Korea | Kim Woo-jin; South Korea | Atanu Das; Olympic Athlete |
| Men's team | South Korea; Kim Woo-jin; Lee Woo-seok; Oh Jin-hyek | North Korea; Kim Kuk-song; Kim Sung-hyok; Ri Tae-bom | Olympic Athlete; Atanu Das; Tarundeep Rai; Jayanta Talukdar |
| Women's individual | Kang Chae-young; South Korea | Zheng Yichai; China | Cao Hui; China |
| Women's team | South Korea; Choi Mi-sun; Kang Chae-young; Lee Eun-gyeong | China; Cao Hui; Long Xiaoqing; Zheng Yichai | Olympic Athlete; Ankita Bhakat; Deepika Kumari; Bombayla Devi Laishram |
| Mixed team | South Korea; Kim Woo-jin; Kang Chae-young | Chinese Taipei; Su Yu-yang; Lei Chien-ying | Olympic Athlete; Atanu Das; Deepika Kumari |

=== Compound ===
| Event | Gold | Silver | Bronze |
|---|---|---|---|
| Men's individual | Choi Yong-hee; South Korea | Nguyễn Văn Đầy; Vietnam | Yang Jae-won; South Korea |
| Men's team | South Korea; Choi Eun-kyu; Choi Yong-hee; Yang Jae-won | Olympic Athlete; Mohan Bhardwaj; Rajat Chauhan; Abhishek Verma | Iran; Danial Heidarzadeh; Nima Mahboubi; Mohammad Saleh Palizban |
| Women's individual | Seol Da-yeong; South Korea | So Chae-won; South Korea | Lin Ming-ching; Chinese Taipei |
| Women's team | South Korea; Seol Da-yeong; So Chae-won; Song Yun-soo | Olympic Athlete; Priya Gurjar; Muskan Kirar; Jyothi Surekha | Kazakhstan; Viktoriya Lyan; Diana Makarchuk; Adel Zhexenbinova |
| Mixed team | Olympic Athlete; Abhishek Verma; Jyothi Surekha | Chinese Taipei; Chen Chieh-lun; Chen Yi-hsuan | South Korea; Yang Jae-won; So Chae-won |

== Medal table ==
| Rank | Nation | Gold | Silver | Bronze | Total |
|---|---|---|---|---|---|
| 1 | South Korea | 9 | 2 | 2 | 13 |
| 2 | Olympic Athlete | 1 | 2 | 4 | 7 |
| 3 | China | 0 | 2 | 1 | 3 |
| 3 | Chinese Taipei | 0 | 2 | 1 | 3 |
| 5 | North Korea | 0 | 1 | 0 | 1 |
| 5 | Vietnam | 0 | 1 | 0 | 1 |
| 7 | Iran | 0 | 0 | 1 | 1 |
| 7 | Kazakhstan | 0 | 0 | 1 | 1 |
| Totals (8 entries) | | 10 | 10 | 10 | 30 |

- Athletes from India competed as Olympic Athlete (WA) due to the suspension of the country's national federation.
