= Guendalina Sartori =

Italian archer (born 1988)

Personal information
- Nationality: Italian
- Born: 8 August 1988 (age 37) Monselice, Italy
- Height: 1.67 m (5 ft 5 1/2 in)
- Weight: 80 kg (180 lb)

Sport
- Country: Italy
- Sport: Archery
- Event: Recurve
Medal record
Women's archery
Representing Italy
World Championships
Gold medal – first place	2011 Turin	Team
Indoor World Championships
Bronze medal – third place	2012 Las Vegas	Team
European Games
Gold medal – first place	2015 Baku	Team

Guendalina Sartori (born 8 August 1988) is an Italian archer. A gold medalist at the World Archery Championships, European Games and the Mediterranean Games, she competed in the 2016 Summer Olympics, finishing in fourth in the women's team event.

== Early and personal life ==
Guendalina Sartori was born on 8 August 1988 in Monselice in the northern Italian province of Padua. She is a member of the Italian Air Force.

Following her fourth-placed finish at the 2016 Olympics with Lucilla Boari and Claudia Mandia, the publication of a story in Italian newspaper QS Quotidiano Sportivo in which the trio were described as "chubby" ignited controversy in Italy which led to the dismissal of the newspaper's editor.

== Career ==
Sartori first took up archery in 2000. She won gold medal in the women's team event at the 2011 World Archery Championships with Natalia Valeeva and Jessica Tomasi, but the following year narrowly missed out on selection for the 2012 Summer Olympics, ultimately acting as the reserve archer for the Italian team.

Sartori had a doubly successful competition at the 2013 Mediterranean Games, combining with Natalia Valeeva and Claudia Mandia in the women's team event to defeat Spain to win the gold medal, before defeating Valeeva and Spain's Mirene Exteberria to win the women's individual title the following day. Another women's team title followed in 2015 at the inaugural European Games in Baku, Sartori partnering with Valeeva and Elena Tonetta to win the gold medal over Belarus.

2016 Summer Olympics

Sartori was a member of the Italian team that won three qualification spots at the 2016 Summer Olympics at the final qualification tournament held in conjunction with the third stage of the 2016 Archery World Cup, defeating Chinese Taipei to enter both the women's individual and team Olympics events. Sartori was selected as the team's captain for her Olympic debut following the retirement of six-time Olympian Valeeva, joining fellow debutants Lucilla Boari and Claudia Mandia in Rio de Janeiro.

Sartori was most successful in the women's team event, where she, Mandia, and Tonetta progressed to the semi-finals before losing to Russia and then Chinese Taipei in the bronze medal match. The fourth-place finish represented Italy's highest ever placing achieved in a women's Olympic archery event. Sartori did not advance far in the women's individual tournament, defeating Colombia's Carolina Aguirre in the opening elimination round before losing to India's Deepika Kumari in the second round.
