= San Yu Htwe =

Burmese archer

Personal information
- Born: 14 October 1986 (age 39) Mindat, Myanmar

Sport
- Country: Myanmar
- Sport: Archery
- Event: Recurve
Medal record
Women's archery
Representing Myanmar
SEA Games
Bronze medal – third place	2013 Naypyidaw	Women's team
- Updated on 26 July 2016

San Yu Htwe (born 14 October 1986) is a Burmese recurve archer from Mindat. She competed in the archery competition at the 2016 Summer Olympics in Rio de Janeiro, where she ranked at #51 in the ranking round. She defeated Taru Kuoppa in the first round and Mackenzie Brown in the second round but lost to the then current Olympic Champion Ki Bo-bae in the third round. She said that she felt too excited to be competing against the current Olympic Champion that her performance was not as good as she hoped.
