= Alexandra Longová =

Slovak archer (born 1994)

Personal information
- Full name: Alexandra Longová
- Nickname: Alex
- Born: 7 February 1994 (age 32) Bratislava, Slovakia
- Height: 1.73 m (5 ft 8 in)
- Weight: 51 kg (112 lb)

Sport
- Country: Slovakia
- Sport: Archery
- Event: Recurve
- Club: Blue Arrows Viničné
- Coached by: Matej Miskovsky
- Updated on 24 February 2017

Alexandra Longová (born 7 February 1994) is a Slovak competitive archer. She has competed at various international competitions including the Summer Olympics, the European Games and the European Championships.

== Career ==
Longová competed in Archery at the 2015 European Games, losing in the second round to Anastasia Pavlova of Ukraine in the second round of the women's individual recurve.

Longová trained under the tutelage of head coach Daniel Kraváček, while shooting at Blue Arrows archery range in the village of Viničné near Bratislava. She secured qualification for the 2016 Summer Olympics as one of three female qualifiers from the qualification event held during the 2016 European Archery Championships in Nottingham, England.

At the 2016 Summer Olympics in Rio de Janeiro, Longová became the first archer to represent independent Slovakia, and the second Slovak Olympic archer overall, after Martin Hámor, who represented Czechoslovakia at the 1992 Summer Olympics in Barcelona. She shared these accolades with male archer Boris Baláž, who later qualified for the men's event in Rio.

Shooting only in the women's individual recurve, Longová comfortably disposed of Indian archer Laxmirani Majhi by 7–1 in the opening round, before she reached the second round where she faced China's Qi Yuhong, who abruptly ended her Olympic debut in a 0–6 defeat.

At the 2018 Summer Youth Olympics in Buenos Aires, Argentina, Longová was selected to represent her country as one of the Young Change-Makers.

Longová competed in the 2021 European Archery Championships in the Turkish city of Antalya. After a first-round bye, she advanced further following a 6–5 win against Slovenian Ana Umer. At the women's individual recurve in the 2022 European Archery Championships in Munich, Longová started with a bye in the first round. She reached the last 32 after beating Beatrice Miklos of Romania, 6–0 in the second round. Longová eventually exited the competition in the round of 32 after a close contest against German archer Katharina Bauer.
