= Bombayla Devi Laishram =

Indian archer (born 1985)

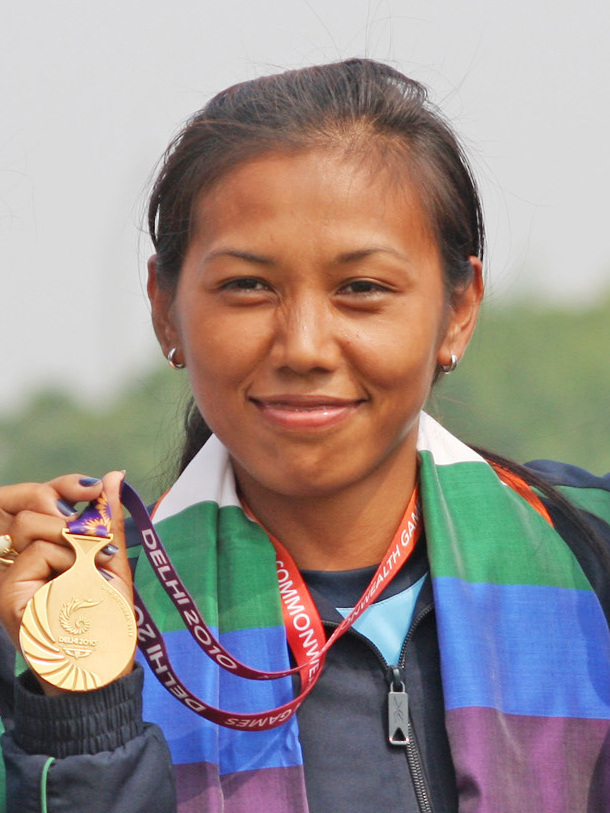
- Laishram in 2010

Personal information
- Nickname: Bom
- National team: India
- Born: 22 February 1985 (age 41) Imphal East, Manipur, India

Sport
- Country: India
- Sport: Archery
Medal record
Women's recurve archery
Representing India
World Championships
Silver medal – second place	2011 Turin	Recurve team
Asian Championships
Silver medal – second place	2015 Bangkok	Team
Bronze medal – third place	2007 Xi'an	Team
Bronze medal – third place	2011 Tehran	Team
Bronze medal – third place	2013 Taipei	Individual
Bronze medal – third place	2019 Bangkok	Team
World Cup
Gold medal – first place	2015 Wrocław	Team
Gold medal – first place	2013 Medellín	Team
Gold medal – first place	2013 Wrocław	Team
Gold medal – first place	2011 Shanghai	Team
Silver medal – second place	2016 Shanghai	Team
Silver medal – second place	2014 Antalya	Team
Silver medal – second place	2012 Shanghai	Team
Silver medal – second place	2011 Ogden	Team
Silver medal – second place	2010 Ogden	Team
Bronze medal – third place	2014 Medellín	Team
Bronze medal – third place	2011 Antalya	Team
Bronze medal – third place	2009 Antalya	Team
Bronze medal – third place	2007 Dover	Team
Commonwealth Games
Gold medal – first place	2010 Delhi	Team

Bombayla Devi Laishram (born 22 February 1985) is an Indian former archer. A member of the national recurve team representing India at the international events for a decade-and-a-half starting 2007, she has won a silver medal at the World Archery Championships, and four gold, five silver, and four bronze medals at various editions of the Archery World Cup. Laishram peaked at no. 14 in the world rankings in March 2009.

Born in Imphal East, Manipur, Laishram began playing archery at the age of 11 and joined the Sports Authority of India under the guidance of her father. Having participated at the national level since 1997, she made her international debut in 2007. Laishram played as a regular member of the recurve team that represented India at the international circuit, winning gold medals at the 2011 Shanghai, and the 2013 Medellin, and the Wrocław World Cup stages. She won her first international individual medal, a bronze at the Asian Archery Championships in 2013.

Laishram has represented India at the Olympics on three occasions, reaching the pre-quarterfinals twice. She has also won medals at other multi-sporting events, including a gold at the Commonwealth and a bronze at the Asian Games. Laishram was awarded the Arjuna Award in 2012 and the Padma Shri in 2019 by the Government of India for her contributions to sports.

== Early life ==
Laishram was born on 22 February 1985, in Manipur to M. Jamini Devi, a local archery coach and Manglem Singh, the state coach for Manipur's handball team. She started archery at the age of 11, and later joined the Sports Authority of India and started training there. Laishram revealed in an interview that she started archery following her family's tradition in the sport. She currently resides in Imphal, Manipur.

== Career ==
=== Breakthrough and career-high ranking (2007–2009) ===
Laishram's breakthrough came in 2007, when she won–as a part of the women's recurve team–the bronze medal at the 2007 Asian Archery Championships. She made her debut at the Archery World Cup in 2007. She was seeded no. 11 after the qualifications rounds, with a total score of 1313; the Indian team consisting of her, Dola Banerjee, and Chekrovolu Swuro were had the highest collective score. Laishram lost in the second round of the individual discipline, but reached the semifinals in the team event. India lost to Italy, but defeated Poland to win the bronze medal.

Laishram represented India at the 2008 Beijing Olympics in the women's individual as well as team events. She, along with Banerjee and Pranitha Vardhineni was ranked sixth in the team event qualifiers. They got a bye in the round of 16, but lost to China by 206–211 in the quarterfinals. In the individual event, she was ranked 22nd in the qualifiers, but lost to Iwona Marcinkiewicz of Poland in the round of 64 in a keenly contested match 101–103.

Laishram reached her career high ranking of no. 14 in 2009, having won another bronze medal at the World Cup, earlier in the year.

=== World Cup and Commonwealth golds (2011–15) ===
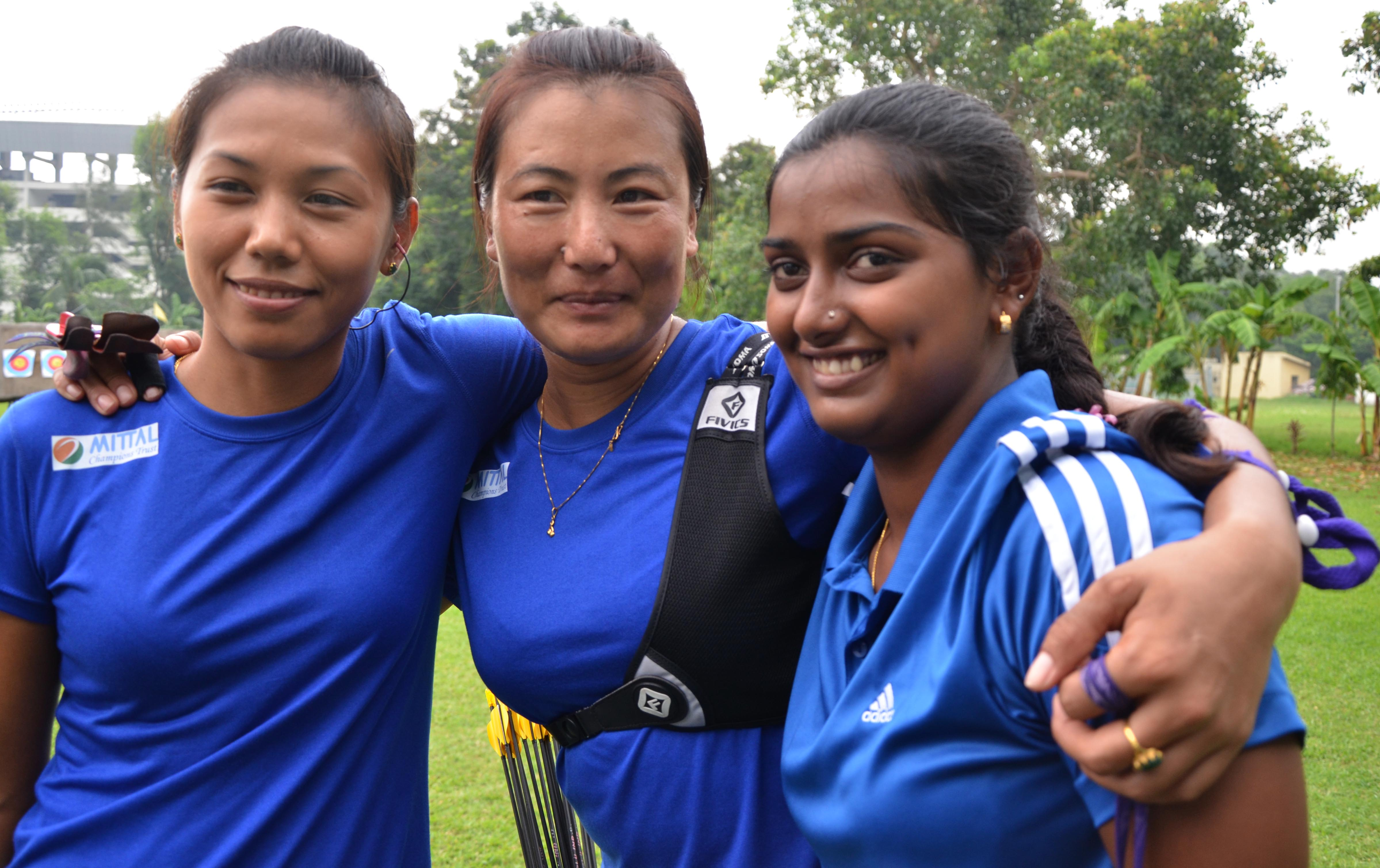
Laishram (first from left) with teammates at the 2012 London Olympics.

Laishram was a part of the recurve team that represented India at the 2010 Commonwealth Games; she, Banerjee, and Deepika Kumari won the Gold medal defeating England in the final.

Beginning 2011, Laishram won a medal at every Archery World Cup until 2016; the run included the gold medal at the 2011 Shanghai World Cup, where the Indian recurve team beat Italy in the final. The Indian team was the no. 1 seed in the tournament, as they had finished at the top in the qualifications stage. Laishram, herself, was placed at no. 8 in the individual qualification round. She lost in the second of the knock-out stages to Mexico's Avitia Mariana in a shootout. Earlier in 2011, Laishram had won the bronze and silver medals in the recurve team event at the Second (held at Antalya, Turkey) and Third (held at Ogden, Utah) stages of the World Cup respectively.

At the 2012 London Olympics, she bowed out in the second round of the women's individual recurve event losing 2–6 to Mexico's Aída Román on 30 July 2012. In the team event, India lost in the first round 211–210 to Denmark. Laishram won her first individual medal in November 2013 at the Asian Archery Championships, finishing in the third place.

=== Rio Olympics and beyond (2016–present) ===
Laishram was the part of the team that qualified for 2016 Rio Olympics. The Indian women's recursive team, consisting of Laishram, Kumari and Laxmirani Majhi, finished 7th in the ranking round. The team won their match against Colombia in the round of 16 before losing the quarterfinal match against Russia.

Bombayla Devi Laishram faced Laurence Baldauff of Austria in the Women's Individual Round of 64 encounter in the 2016 Olympics, she won the match 6–2 and progressed to the next round. In the Round of 32, Bombayla Devi faced Lin Shih-chia of Chinese Taipei. She won the match 6–2 and advanced to the Round of 16. However, she was not able to get past Alejandra Valencia of Mexico in the round of 16 and she lost with a score of 2 against 6.

== Awards and recognition ==
In 2012, the Government of India awarded Laishram with the Arjuna Award, India's second highest sporting honour. She was later awarded the fourth highest national civilian honour, the Padma Shri in 2019.
