= Lin Shih-chia (archer) =

Taiwanese archer (born 1993)

Personal information
- Full name: Lin Shih-chia
- Born: 20 May 1993 (age 33) Hsinchu, Taiwan
- Height: 1.69 m (5 ft 7 in)
- Weight: 57 kg (126 lb)

Sport
- Country: Chinese Taipei
- Sport: Archery
- Event: Recurve
Medal record
Women's recurve archery
Representing Chinese Taipei
Olympic Games
Bronze medal – third place	2016 Rio de Janeiro	Team
World Championships
Silver medal – second place	2015 Copenhagen	Individual
Silver medal – second place	2015 Copenhagen	Mixed team
Bronze medal – third place	2017 Mexico	Team
Asian Championships
Silver medal – second place	2013 Taipei	Team
Universiade
Gold medal – first place	2015 Gwangju	Team
- Updated on 22 February 2017

Lin Shih-chia (Chinese: 林詩嘉; pinyin: Lín Shījiā; born 20 May 1993) is a Taiwanese competitive archer. She has won a career total of four medals (one gold, two silver, and one bronze) in a major international competition, spanning the Summer Universiade, the World Championships, and the Summer Olympics.

Lin rose to prominence in the global archery scene at the 2015 Summer Universiade in Gwangju, South Korea. There, she confidently took out the slick South Korean women from the final match 5–3 to hand the trio of Hsiung Mei-chien and London 2012 Olympian Tan Ya-ting a gold-medal triumph in the team recurve tournament.

Shortly after the Universiade, Lin continued to build her success in the sport by adding two more medals to her career treasury, a silver each in the individual and mixed team recurve, at the World Championships in Copenhagen, Denmark.

Lin was selected to compete for Chinese Taipei's archery squad at the 2016 Summer Olympics in Rio de Janeiro, shooting in both individual and team recurve tournaments. Two months before her maiden Games, she commanded the Chinese Taipei trio in defeating the Estonian side for one of three women's team spaces at the World Archery Cup meet in Antalya, Turkey. Lin opened the tournament by discharging 651 points, 15 perfect tens, and 6 bull's eyes to seal the ninth seed against a field of 63 other archers in the classification round, along with her trio's cumulative score of 1,932. Sitting outside of the top three at fourth position in the team recurve, Lin and her compatriots Tan and Le Chien-ying bounced back from their semifinal defeat to the eventual champions South Korea to secure a 5–3 triumph over the Italian women for the bronze medal. In the women's individual recurve, Lin successfully held off a spirited challenge by Egypt's Reem Mansour in the opening round, before she faced a 2–6 defeat in her subsequent match from the unheralded Indian Bombayla Devi Laishram.
