= Lei Chien-ying =

Taiwanese archer (born 1990)

Personal information
- Nationality: Republic of China
- Born: 17 April 1990 (age 36) New Taipei City, Taiwan
- Height: 1.65 m (5 ft 5 in)
- Weight: 65 kg (143 lb)

Sport
- Sport: Archery
Medal record
Women's recurve archery
Representing Chinese Taipei
Olympic Games
Bronze medal – third place	2016 Rio de Janeiro	Team
World Championships
Gold medal – first place	2019 's-Hertogenbosch	Individual
Gold medal – first place	2019 's-Hertogenbosch	Team
Asian Games
Silver medal – second place	2018 Jakarta	Team
Asian Championships
Gold medal – first place	2013 Taipei	Individual
Gold medal – first place	2015 Bangkok	Mixed team
Silver medal – second place	2013 Taipei	Team
Silver medal – second place	2019 Bangkok	Mixed team
Summer Universiade
Silver medal – second place	2017 Taipei	Team
Bronze medal – third place	2011 Shenzhen	Team

Lei Chien-ying (Chinese: 雷千瑩; pinyin: Léi Qiānyíng, born 17 April 1990) is a Taiwanese archer.

== Career ==
At the 2012 Summer Olympics she competed for her country in the women's team event and women's individual event. She also represented Chinese Taipei at the 2016 Summer Olympics in Rio de Janeiro winning a bronze medal in the women's team event, with Tan Ya-Ting and Lin Shih-Chia.

She qualified for the 2020 Summer Olympics in the women's individual and team events.
