= Archery at the 2016 Summer Olympics =

Archery at the Games of the XXXI Olympiad
- Archery pictogram at the 2016 Summer Olympics
- Venue: Sambadrome Marquês de Sapucaí
- Dates: 6–12 August 2016
- No. of events: 4
- Competitors: 128 from 56 nations

The archery events at the 2016 Summer Olympics in Rio de Janeiro were held over a seven-day period from 6 to 12 August. Four events took place, all were staged at the Sambadrome Marquês de Sapucaí.

== Competition format ==
A total of 128 athletes, 64 women and 64 men, competed across the four events: the men's individual, women's individual, men's team and women's team.

All four events were recurve archery events, held under the World Archery-approved 70-meter distance and rules. The competition started with an initial ranking round involving all 64 archers of each gender. Each archer would shoot a total of 72 arrows to be seeded from 1–64 according to their score.

The ranking round was also used to seed the teams from 1 to 12, by aggregating the individual scores for the members of each team.

Each event was played in a single-elimination tournament format, except for the semi-final losers, who would play off to decide the bronze medal winner.

=== Individual events ===
In the individual events, all 64 competitors entered the competition at the first round, the round of 64. The draw was seeded according to the result of the ranking round so the first seed shot against the 64th seed in the first round.

Each match was scored using the Archery Olympic Round, consisting of the best-of-five sets, with three arrows per set. The winner of each set received two points, and if the scores in the set had tied then each archer would have received one point. If at the end of five sets the score had been tied at 5–5, a single arrow shoot-off would have held and the closest to the center would be declared the winner.

=== Team events ===
In the team events, the top four seeded teams from the ranking round will receive a bye to the quarter-final. The remaining eight teams, seeded 5th to 12th, will compete for the remaining four places in the quarter-finals.

For the first time, the team event has followed the same Archery Olympic Round set system as the individual event.

== Schedule ==
All times are Brasília Time (UTC−3).

Day	Date	Start	Finish	Event	Phase
Day 0	Friday 5 August 2016			Men's individual	Ranking round
Day 0	Friday 5 August 2016			Women's individual	Ranking round
Day 1	Saturday 6 August 2016	9:00	17:45	Men's team	Eliminations/Medal round
Day 2	Sunday 7 August 2016	9:00	17:45	Women's team	Eliminations/Medal round
Day 3	Monday 8 August 2016	9:00	17:45	Men's individual	1/32 & 1/16 Eliminations
Day 3	Monday 8 August 2016	9:00	17:45	Women's individual	1/32 & 1/16 Eliminations
Day 4	Tuesday 9 August 2016	9:00	17:45	Men's individual	1/32 & 1/16 Eliminations
Day 4	Tuesday 9 August 2016	9:00	17:45	Women's individual	1/32 & 1/16 Eliminations
Day 5	Wednesday 10 August 2016	9:00	18:55	Men's individual	1/32 & 1/16 Eliminations
Day 5	Wednesday 10 August 2016	9:00	18:55	Women's individual	1/32 & 1/16 Eliminations
Day 6	Thursday 11 August 2016	9:00	17:10	Women's individual	1/8 Eliminations/Quarter/Semi finals/Medal round
Day 7	Friday 12 August 2016	9:00	17:10	Men's individual	1/8 Eliminations/Quarter/Semi finals/Medal round

== Participating nations ==
Archers from 56 nations participated at the 2016 Summer Olympics.

- Australia (4)
- Austria (1)
- Azerbaijan (1)
- Bangladesh (1)
- Belarus (1)
- Belgium (1)
- Bhutan (1)
- Brazil (6)
- Canada (2)
- Chile (1)
- China (6)
- Colombia (4)
- Cuba (1)
- Dominican Republic (1)
- Egypt (2)
- Estonia (1)
- Fiji (1)
- Finland (2)
- France (3)
- Georgia (3)
- Germany (2)
- Greece (1)
- Great Britain (2)
- India (4)
- Indonesia (4)
- Iran (1)
- Italy (6)
- Ivory Coast (1)
- Japan (4)
- Kazakhstan (2)
- Kenya (1)
- Libya (1)
- Malawi (1)
- Malaysia (3)
- Mexico (4)
- Moldova (1)
- Mongolia (1)
- Myanmar (1)
- Nepal (1)
- Netherlands (3)
- North Korea (1)
- Norway (1)
- Poland (1)
- Russia (3)
- Slovakia (2)
- South Korea (6)
- Spain (4)
- Sweden (1)
- Chinese Taipei (6)
- Thailand (1)
- Tonga (2)
- Turkey (2)
- Ukraine (4)
- United States (4)
- Venezuela (2)
- Zimbabwe (1)

== Medal summary ==
=== Medal table ===
Rank	Nation	Gold	Silver	Bronze	Total
1	South Korea	4	0	1	5
2	United States	0	1	1	2
3	France	0	1	0	1
3	Germany	0	1	0	1
3	Russia	0	1	0	1
6	Australia	0	0	1	1
6	Chinese Taipei	0	0	1	1
Totals (7 entries)		4	4	4	12

=== Medalists ===
Event	Gold	Silver	Bronze
Men's individual	Ku Bon-chan; South Korea	Jean-Charles Valladont; France	Brady Ellison; United States
Men's team	South Korea; Ku Bon-chan; Lee Seung-yun; Kim Woo-jin	United States; Brady Ellison; Zach Garrett; Jake Kaminski	Australia; Alec Potts; Ryan Tyack; Taylor Worth
Women's individual	Chang Hye-jin; South Korea	Lisa Unruh; Germany	Ki Bo-bae; South Korea
Women's team	South Korea; Chang Hye-jin; Choi Mi-sun; Ki Bo-bae	Russia; Tuyana Dashidorzhieva; Ksenia Perova; Inna Stepanova	Chinese Taipei; Le Chien-ying; Lin Shih-chia; Tan Ya-ting

== See also ==
- Archery at the 2016 Summer Paralympics
