= Ane Marcelle dos Santos =

Brazilian archer (born 1994)

Personal information
- Full name: Ane Marcelle Gomes dos Santos
- Born: 12 January 1994 (age 32) Maricá, Rio de Janeiro, Brazil
- Height: 1.53 m (5 ft 0 in)
- Weight: 53 kg (117 lb)

Sport
- Country: Brazil
- Sport: Archery
- Event: Recurve
- Club: Arqueiros da Iris
- Coached by: Evandro Azevedo (national)
Medal record
Representing Brazil
Women's recurve archery
South American Games
Gold medal – first place	2026 Santa Fe	Team
Silver medal – second place	2026 Santa Fe	Individual

Ane Marcelle Gomes dos Santos (born 12 January 1994) is a Brazilian competitive archer. She won a bronze medal in the women's individual recurve tournament at the 2014 Pan American Archery Championships in Buenos Aires, Argentina, and eventually finished as one of the top 16 finalists at the 2016 Summer Olympics. Dos Santos currently trains under the tutelage of head coach Evandro Azevedo for the Brazilian national squad, while shooting at Iris Archery Range (Portuguese: Arqueiros da Iris) on the outskirts of her hometown Maricá in Rio de Janeiro.

Dos Santos was selected by the Brazilian Olympic Committee to compete for the host nation's archery squad at the 2016 Summer Olympics in Rio de Janeiro, shooting in both individual and team recurve tournaments. First, dos Santos discharged 637 points, 17 perfect tens, and 7 bull's eyes to lead the home team for the twenty-sixth seed heading to the knockout draw from the classification round, along with the trio's cumulative score of 1,845. Sitting at eleventh in the team recurve, dos Santos and her compatriots Sarah Nikitin and Marina Canetta put up a gallant fight amid the loud applause of their parochial crowd, but bowed out of the opening round match to the Italians in straight sets 0–6. While her teammates fell out early in the elimination rounds of the women's individual recurve, dos Santos successfully reached the pre-quarterfinal match by dispatching Japan's Saori Nagamine (7–3) and Australia's Alice Ingley (6–0), before she faced a 2–6 defeat from Great Britain's experienced Olympian Naomi Folkard.

She participated in the 2019 Pan American Games's women's individual, women's team and mixed team recurve events.

She competed at the 2020 Summer Olympics.
