= Inna Stepanova =

Russian archer (born 1990)

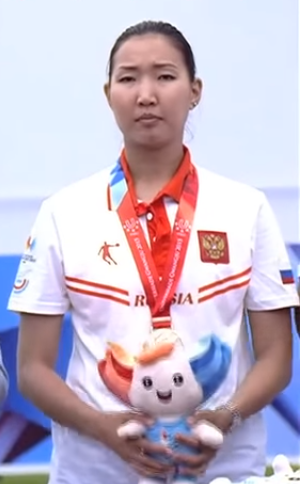

Personal information
- Full name: Inna Yakovlevna Stepanova
- Born: 17 April 1990 (age 36) Ulan-Ude, Buryatia, Russian SFSR

Sport
- Country: Russia
- Sport: Archery
- Event: recurve
Medal record
Women's archery
Representing Russia
Olympic Games
Silver medal – second place	2016 Rio de Janeiro	Women's team
World Championships
Gold medal – first place	2015 Copenhagen	Women's team
European Championships
Gold medal – first place	2010 Rovereto	Women's team
Silver medal – second place	2010 Rovereto	Women's individual
Bronze medal – third place	2018 Legnica	Mixed team
Summer Universiade
Bronze medal – third place	2015 Gwangju	Women's team
Bronze medal – third place	2015 Gwangju	Mixed
Military World Games
Gold medal – first place	2019 Wuhan	Mixed team
Silver medal – second place	2019 Wuhan	Women's team
Bronze medal – third place	2019 Wuhan	Individual

Inna Yakovlevna Stepanova (Russian: Инна Яковлевна Степанова; born 17 April 1990) is a Russian archer of Buryat ethnicity. Stepanova is a student of Physical Education at Buryat State University.

== Career ==
At the 2012 Summer Olympics she competed for her country in the Women's team event, reaching the semifinals in the women's team event where her team lost to China 207 to 208, and then lost the bronze medal match 207 to 209 to Japan. She placed 17th in the ranking round of the women's individual archery competition.

At the 2016 Summer Olympics Inna Stepanova won the silver medal in the team competition, with Tuyana Dashidorzhiyeva and Kseniya Perova. She placed 9th in the individual event.
