= Chang Hye-jin =

South Korean archer (born 1987)

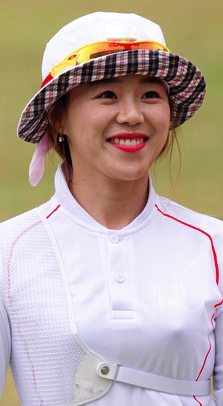
- Chang at the 2014 Asian Games

Personal information
- Nationality: South Korean
- Born: 13 May 1987 (age 39) Daegu, South Korea
- Education: Keimyung University
- Height: 158 cm (5 ft 2 in)
- Weight: 50 kg (110 lb)

Sport
- Sport: Archery
- Event: Recurve archery
- Club: LH

Achievements and titles
- Highest world ranking: No. 1 (26 June 2017)
Medal record
Women's recurve archery
Representing South Korea
Summer Olympics
Gold medal – first place	2016 Rio de Janeiro	Individual
Gold medal – first place	2016 Rio de Janeiro	Team
World Championships
Gold medal – first place	2013 Belek	Team
Gold medal – first place	2017 Mexico City	Team
Silver medal – second place	2017 Mexico City	Individual
Silver medal – second place	2019 's-Hertogenbosch	Team
World Cup Final
Gold medal – first place	2017 Rome	Mixed Team
Gold medal – first place	2018 Samsun	Mixed Team
Bronze medal – third place	2017 Rome	Individual
Asian Games
Gold medal – first place	2014 Incheon	Team
Gold medal – first place	2018 Jakarta	Team
Silver medal – second place	2014 Incheon	Individual
Asian Championships
Gold medal – first place	2015 Bangkok	Individual
Gold medal – first place	2015 Bangkok	Team
Silver medal – second place	2015 Bangkok	Mixed team
Summer Universiade
Gold medal – first place	2009 Belgrade	Team

Korean name
- Hangul: 장혜진
- RR: Jang Hyejin
- MR: Chang Hyejin

Chang Hye-jin (Korean: 장혜진; Korean pronunciation: [tɕɐŋ.çe.dʑin]; born 13 May 1987) is a South Korean former recurve archer. A two-time Olympic gold medalist, Chang was the Olympic champion in both the women's individual and women's team events at 2016 Summer Olympics in Rio de Janeiro. She is also a former number one-ranked recurve archer, having headed the World Archery Rankings between 2017 and 2019.

After being introduced to archery at the age of eleven, Chang made her international debut in 2008. She first qualified for the senior South Korean national team in 2010 and over the next nine years regularly represented her country at international competitions, winning team gold medals at the World Archery Championships, the World Cup finals, the Asian Games, and the Summer Universiade. She was additionally the women's individual runner-up at the 2017 World Championships. Chang retired from competitive archery in 2022.

== Early life ==
Chang Hye-jin was born on 13 May 1987 in the city of Daegu. She was first introduced to archery at the age of eleven and participated in her first national tournament two years later. She won her first tournament during her second year of high school in Daegu, and after studying at Daegu's Keimyung University, joined the Seoul-based LH team to shoot professionally. As of August 2018 she remains a member of the LH team.

== Career ==
=== 2008–2014: Early career ===
Chang made her international debut in 2008 at the World University Games held in Chinese Taipei. The following year she was selected to compete in Summer Universiade in Belgrade, winning gold medal in the women's team recurve event. She successfully qualified for the South Korean senior team in 2010, but in 2012 narrowly missed out on selection for that year's Summer Olympics in London, placing fourth in the national team trials in which the top three were chosen for Olympic competition.

Chang made her debut at the biennial World Archery Championships in 2013, winning the women's team recurve title with Ki Bo-bae and Yun Ok-hee after defeating Belarus in a low-scoring final. Eleven months later she won two medals at the 2014 Asian Games, reaching the gold medal match in both the women's team and women's individual recurve events. With teammates Jung Dasomi and Lee Tuk-young she secured South Korea's fifth consecutive women's team title after a comfortable victory over China, but was outshot by Jung by seven set points to three in the individual final.

=== 2016: Olympic champion ===
In the spring of 2016 Chang won qualification for the South Korean Olympic team on her second attempt, joining the reigning Olympic champion Ki Bo-bae and the women's recurve world number one Choi Mi-sun for the 2016 Summer Olympics in Rio de Janeiro. Though the trio were widely expected to win their nation's eighth consecutive Olympic gold medal in the team competition, pre-tournament predictions favoured Choi and Ki over Chang for the individual crown after the pair's strong performances at the 2015 World Championships, with Reuters later describing Chang as the "least-fancied" of the three Korean women.

In Rio de Janeiro Chang concluded the preliminary 72-arrow ranking round in second position with a score of 666 points from a maximum of 720. This gave her the number two seed for the individual competition. With Choi and Ki also scoring highly to finish the round in first and third place respectively, a combined score of 1,998 points earned the trio the top seed for the team competition. Chang, Choi, and Ki were successful in extending South Korea's undefeated streak in the team event, which took place prior to the individual competition, overcoming the second-seeded Russian team to win their nation's eighth successive Olympic title.

As the number two seed in the individual event, Chang avoided facing either Ki or Choi until at least the semi-final stage. Four wins in the first four rounds duly set up an all-South Korean semi-final against Ki in the last four, with Choi having been eliminated in the preceding quarter-final round. Although Ki was the favourite going into the match, Chang overcame a poor start to win by seven set points to three and advance to the final. Her opponent in the final was Germany's Lisa Unruh, who had unexpectedly reached the gold medal match after concluding the ranking round in twenty-first place. Chang defeated Unruh by six set points to two, winning her a second Olympic gold medal and becoming the eighth South Korean to be crowned as the women's Olympic individual archery champion. Her victory also marked South Korea's twenty-second Olympic gold medal in archery, surpassing short track speed skating as the nation's most successful Olympic sport.

Chang's achievements earned her the accolade of top female athlete at the 2016 Korea Woman Sports Awards.

=== 2017–2018: World number one ===
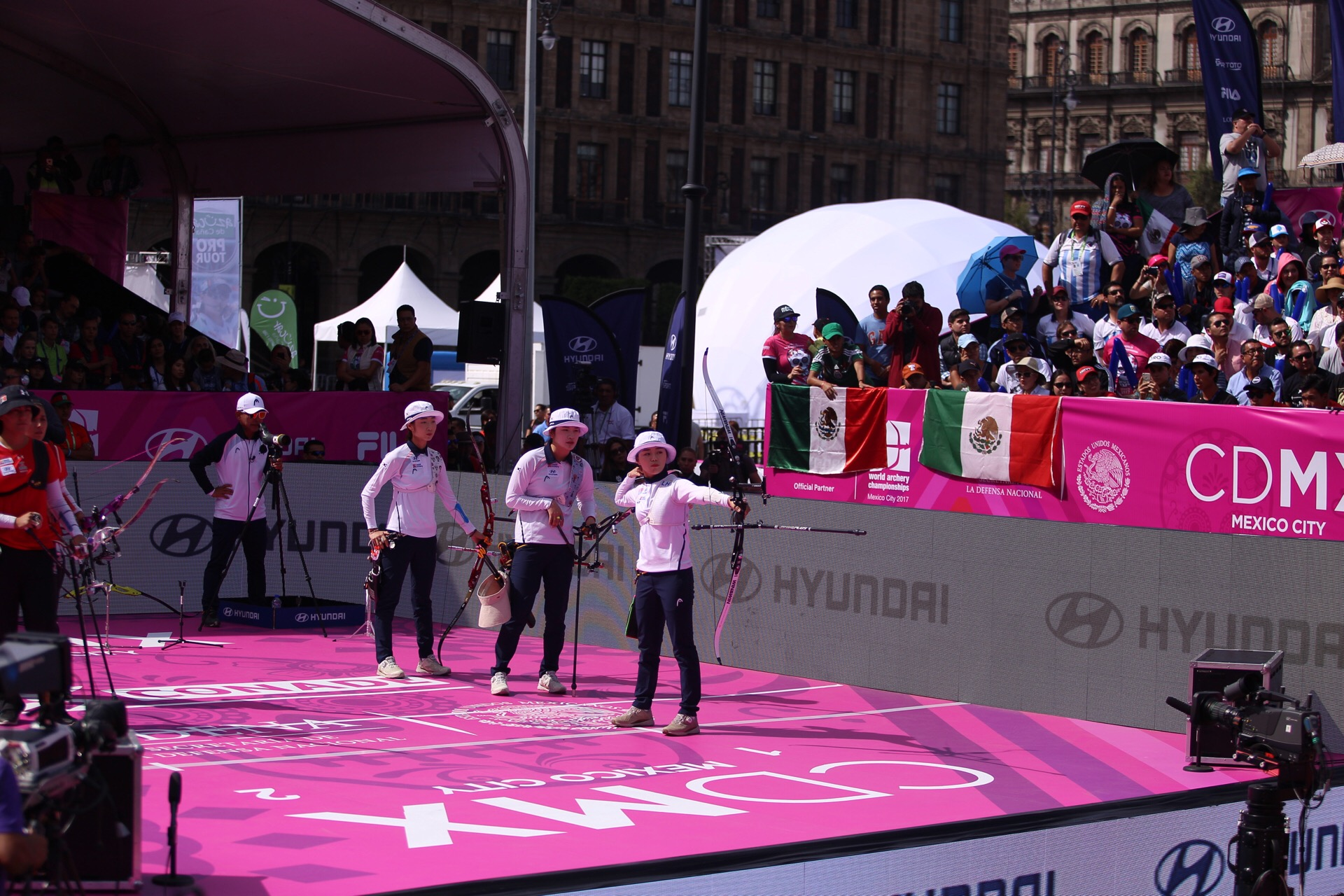
Chang (front) shoots an arrow during the women's team final at the 2017 World Archery Championships

Chang became the world's top female recurve archer in June 2017. At the annual Archery World Cup final in September she won two medals, achieving gold in the mixed team event with Kim Woojin and bronze in the women's individual event. In October Chang partnered Choi Mi-sun and Kang Chae-young at the 2017 World Championships, helping secure South Korea's thirteenth World Championship gold medal in the women's team event after defeating host nation Mexico in the final. She later finished as the runner-up in the women's individual event after losing to the Russian world number three Ksenia Perova in the gold medal match.

Chang began 2018 strongly with victory in the first stage of the Archery World Cup in April, dropping just two points in the final against China's An Qixuan. Her win was notable for her precise shooting in the match's second set, where from a distance of 70 metres (230 ft) she placed her three arrows within three centimetres (1.2 in) of one another inside the target's innermost ring, a feat lauded as one of the finest achievements recorded in a modern recurve competition. Chang also progressed to the final of the World Cup's second stage held one month later, where she was again defeated by Ksenia Perova.

For the 2018 Asian Games held in August in Jakarta, Chang competed alongside Kang Chae-young, Lee Eun-gyeong, and Lee Woo-seok. Although she was praised for her consistency by the Korea JoongAng Daily after retaining her place in the national team for a fifth consecutive year, Chang delivered an uneven performance in her events and suffered quarter-final defeats in both the women's individual and mixed team events before winning gold in the women's team event. These results ran contrary to expectations of her winning gold in all three events and came amid wider South Korean sporting disappointments at the Games. The Korea JoongAng Daily suggested that the pressure placed on her shoulders to succeed contributed to her inconsistent form, commenting that her "struggle seemed to be more mental than a lack of skill." Chang was later eliminated from the World Cup's final stage in September by the eventual runner-up Yasemin Anagoz, but maintained her position as the World Archery Federation's number one-ranked female recurve archer at the end of the year.

=== 2019–2022: Decline and retirement ===
In 2019 Chang partnered Choi Mi-sun and Kang Chae-young at the World Championships in June, achieving a silver medal in the women's team event after the trio lost to Taiwan in the final. By July of that year Chang had been identified by the magazine Bow International as having noticeably dipped in form since the beginning of 2018, and in September she was eliminated from the national selection process for the 2020 Summer Olympics after finishing outside the top 20 qualifiers. She was however afforded a second opportunity to qualify after the COVID-19 pandemic forced the postponement of the Olympics until the following year. In March 2021 she was eliminated from contention for a second time.

In August 2022 Chang announced her retirement from competitive archery.

== See also ==
- Korean archery
- List of South Korean archers
