= Choi Mi-sun =

South Korean archer (born 1996)

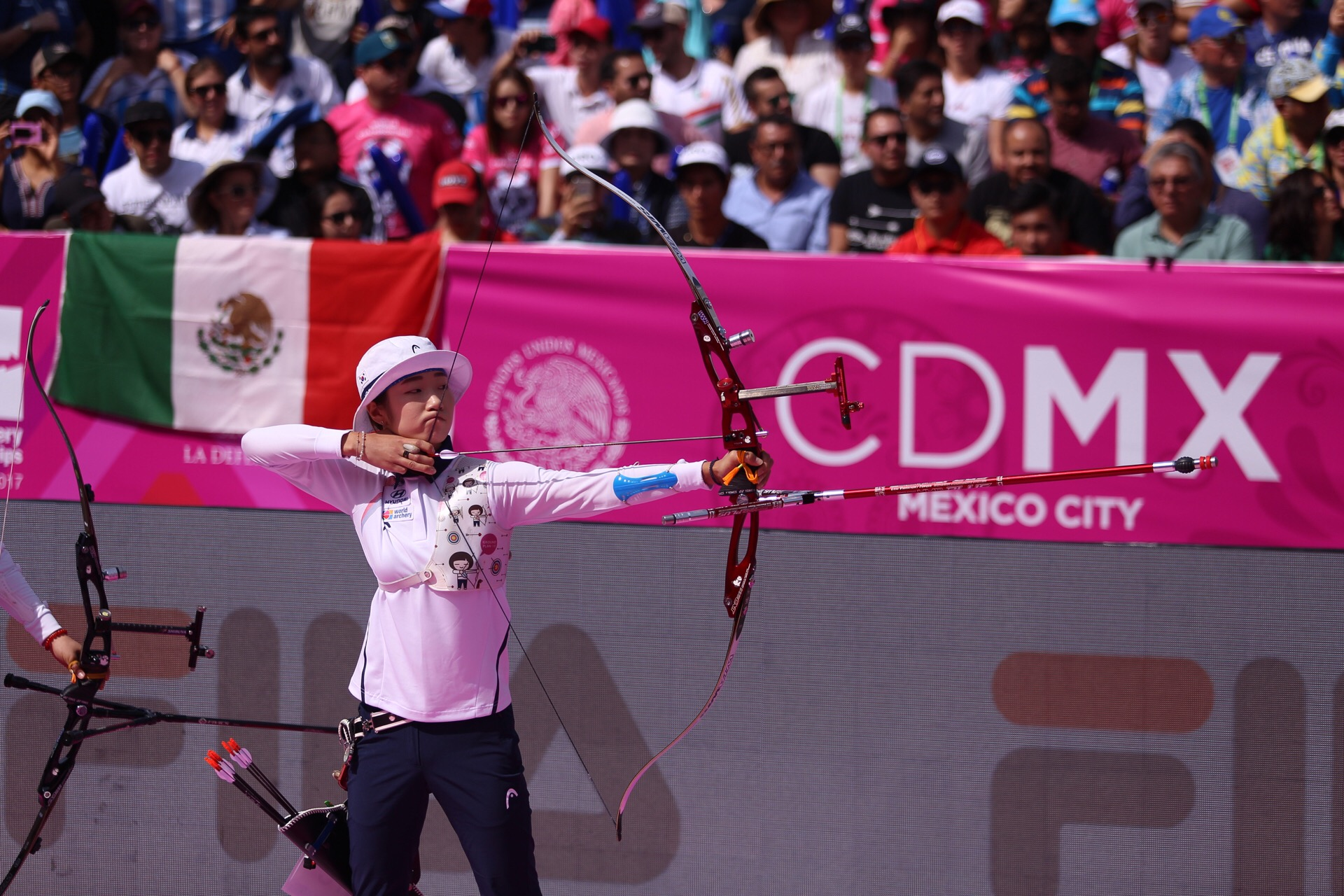
- Choi in 2017

Personal information
- Born: 1 July 1996 (age 30) Muan County, South Korea
- Education: Gwangju Women's University
- Height: 168 cm (5 ft 6 in)
- Weight: 53 kg (117 lb)

Sport
- Country: South Korea
- Sport: Archery
- Coached by: Kim Sung-eun
Medal record
Women's recurve archery
Representing South Korea
Olympic Games
| Gold medal – first place | 2016 Rio de Janeiro | Team |
World Championships
| Gold medal – first place | 2017 Mexico City | Team |
| Silver medal – second place | 2019 's-Hertogenbosch | Team |
| Bronze medal – third place | 2015 Copenhagen | Individual |
| Bronze medal – third place | 2015 Copenhagen | Team |
| Bronze medal – third place | 2019 's-Hertogenbosch | Individual |
| | Competition | World Cup Final |
| Gold medal – first place | 2015 Mexico | Individual |
| Gold medal – first place | 2015 Mexico | Mixed team |
| Gold medal – first place | 2016 Odense | Mixed team |
| Silver medal – second place | 2016 Odense | Individual |
| Silver medal – second place | 2022 Tlaxcala | Individual |
Asian Games
| Gold medal – first place | 2022 Hangzhou | Women's team |
Asian Championships
| Gold medal – first place | 2013 Taipei | Team |
| Gold medal – first place | 2019 Bangkok | Team |
| Gold medal – first place | 2023 Bangkok | Individual |
| Gold medal – first place | 2023 Bangkok | Team |
| Silver medal – second place | 2013 Taipei | Mixed team |
Summer Universiade
| Gold medal – first place | 2017 Taipei | Mixed Team |
| Gold medal – first place | 2017 Taipei | Team |
| Gold medal – first place | 2019 Naples | Team |
| Gold medal – first place | 2021 Chengdu | Individual |
| Silver medal – second place | 2015 Gwangju | Individual |
| Silver medal – second place | 2015 Gwangju | Team |
| Silver medal – second place | 2019 Naples | Individual |
| Silver medal – second place | 2021 Chengdu | Team |

Korean name
- Hangul: 최미선
- Hanja: 崔美善
- RR: Choe Miseon
- MR: Ch'oe Misŏn

Choi Mi-sun (Korean: 최미선, Korean pronunciation: [tɕʰwe̞.mi.sʌn]; born 1 July 1996) is a South Korean recurve archer. She won gold medal in the women's team event at the 2016 Summer Olympics in Rio de Janeiro.

== Career ==
=== 2015: Instant success ===
Choi made her international debut in May 2015 at the opening stage of the 2015 Archery World Cup in Shanghai, finishing her first competition with a third place in the women's individual event. Two stage wins followed at the World Cup's second leg in Antalya later that month, Choi defeating compatriots Chang Hye-jin and the highly favoured 2012 double Olympic gold medalist Ki Bo-bae in the stage's semi-finals and final respectively of the women's individual tournament, before combining with Kim Woojin to win the mixed team event.

Choi's next international tournament was the 2015 Summer Universiade in July. Having been named for the South Korean team alongside Ki, she advanced successfully in the women's individual event to contest her second final of the year against the Olympic champion, the match-up being characterised as a battle between the present and future stars of Korean archery by the Korean newspaper Chungnam Ilbo. Ki emerged victorious in what the Yonhap News Agency called a "memorable duel", outscoring Choi ten points to nine in a one-arrow shoot-off after a closely fought match.

Choi would go on to have further success later in the year, winning medals at the World Archery Championships and an individual gold medal at the season-ending Archery World Cup finals.

=== 2016: Olympic gold medalist ===
Choi won selection to her maiden Olympic Games in the spring of 2016, joining Chang Hye-jin and defending Olympic champion Ki Bo-bae in Rio de Janeiro as part of the South Korea women's team bid to defend their women's individual and women's team titles. In the run-up to the Games she was tipped as one of the favourites to win the women's individual gold medal alongside Ki and Chinese Taipei's Tan Ya-ting, with Jane Zorowitz of American broadcaster NBC describing Choi as Ki's "biggest roadblock" to retaining her Olympic title. Her prospects of an Olympic medal were enhanced in June when she matched Ki's world record score of 686 for a 72-arrow round at the third stage of the 2016 Archery World Cup.

At the Olympic Games in August the women's team event landed Choi her first Olympic medal, the Korean trio comfortably defeating Russia in the gold medal final by five set points to one amid difficult conditions. The victory brought South Korea's eighth successive women's team Olympic title. Choi's performance in the women's individual event was however more mixed. She began strongly in the 72-arrow ranking round, and was on course to surpass the twenty-year old Olympic record score of 673 set by Lina Herasymenko before breezy conditions developed mid-way through the round and halted her progress. She nevertheless earned the top seed for the elimination stages after ranking first with 669 points from a maximum of 720, three points ahead of Chang and six ahead of Ki. She was however eliminated in the quarter-finals by Alejandra Valencia, the 2011 Pan American Games double gold medalist, in a surprise result. A score of five on her first arrow began a subpar performance which ended in Choi losing in straight sets.

=== 2017: World record ===
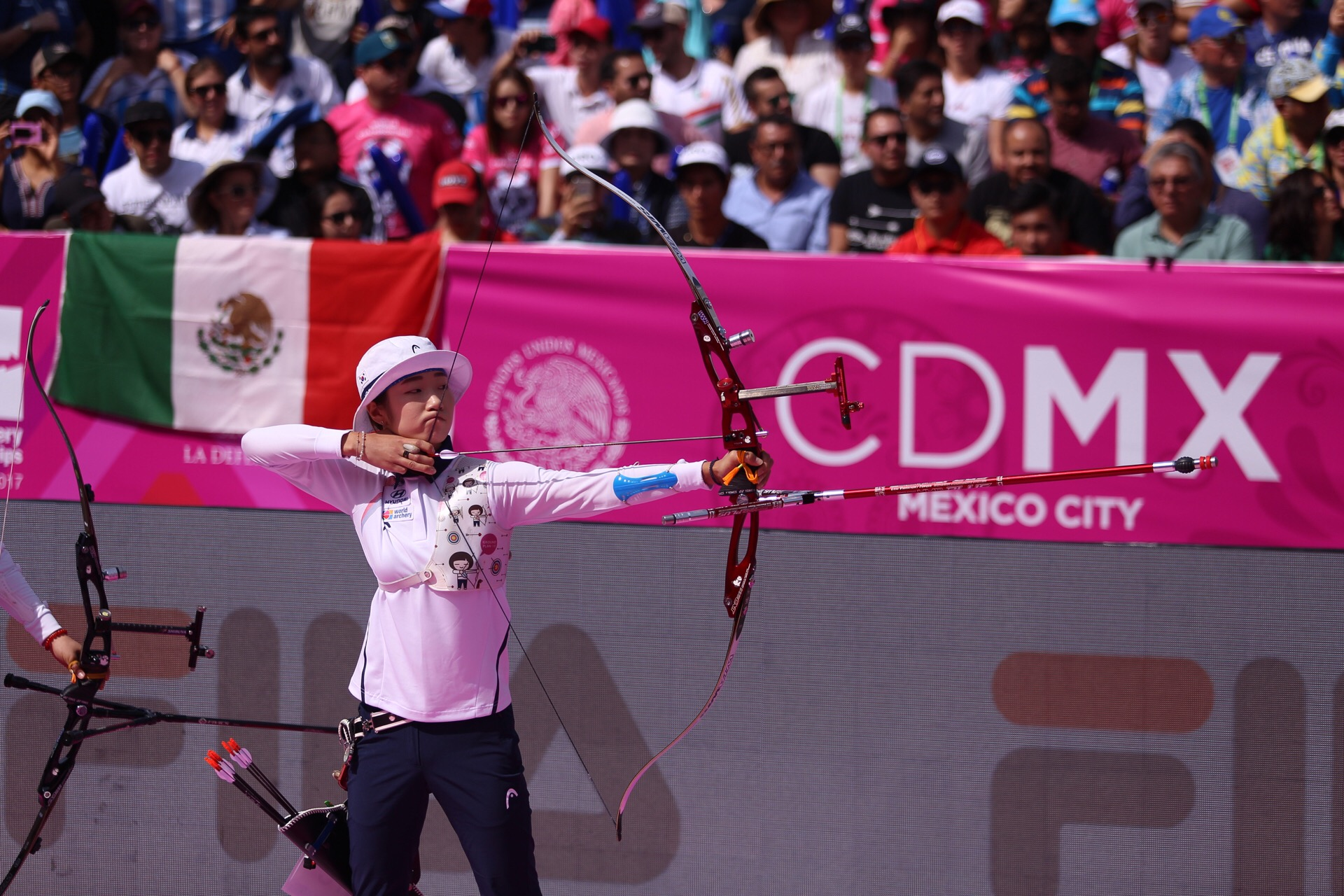
Choi at the 2017 World Archery Championships

The 2017 Summer Universiade in Taipei City saw Choi break the world record score for a 72-arrow round with 687 points, surpassing the former record set by Ki Bo-bae at the 2015 Summer Universiade by one point. Reflecting on her achievement, Choi admitted she was still fatigued after her World Cup appearances earlier in the year but felt the accommodating weather conditions helped her shoot well.

The World Championships held in Mexico City in September gave Choi her first World Championship gold medal. Partnering Chang Hye-jin and Kang Chae-young she triumphed against host nation Mexico in the women's team final, the three overcoming a slow start to win South Korea's thirteenth World Championship women's team title. In the women's individual event Choi joined her teammates at the head of the ranking round standings in fourth place with 671 points, albeit finishing thirteen points behind leader Kang. She would later bow out in the final sixteen to Russia's Ksenia Perova.

In October Choi was one of nine athletes honoured with a national award for sporting excellence at the 55th Korea Sports Awards.

=== 2018–2019: Absence and return ===
Choi was not selected for Korea's international team in 2018, but was named alongside Chang Hye-jin and Kang Chae-young to contest the 2019 season.
