= Cao Hui =

Chinese archer (born 1991)

Personal information
- Born: 7 September 1991 (age 34) Benxi, Liaoning, China
- Height: 175 cm (5 ft 9 in)
- Weight: 70 kg (154 lb)

Sport
- Country: China
- Sport: Archery
- Event: Recurve
Medal record
Women's recurve archery
Representing China
Asian Championships
Silver medal – second place	2019 Bangkok	Team
Bronze medal – third place	2015 Bangkok	Team
Bronze medal – third place	2019 Bangkok	Individual

Cao Hui (Chinese: 曹慧; pinyin: Cáo Huì, born 7 September 1991) is a Chinese female recurve archer and part of the national team and Liaoning team. She won the bronze medal at the 2015 Asian Archery Championships in the women's team event.

She represented China at the 2016 Summer Olympics in Rio de Janeiro.
