= Claudia Mandia =

Italian archer (born 1992)

Personal information
- National team: 2016
- Born: 21 October 1992 (age 33) Battipaglia, Italy
- Height: 1.70 m (5 ft 7 in)

Sport
- Country: Italy
- Sport: Archery
- Rank: 58 at World Archery Rankings (March 2016)
- Event: Recurve
- Club: Fiamme Azzurre
- Updated on 1 August 2015

Claudia Mandia (born 21 October 1992) is an Italian female recurve archer and part of the national team.

She won the bronze medal at the 2016 World Indoor Archery Championships in the women's individual event.
