= Marina Canetta =

Brazilian archer (born 1989)

Marina Canetta Gobbi
Personal information
- Born: 1 April 1989 (age 37) São Paulo

Sport
- Country: Brazil
- Sport: Archery
- Event: Recurve
Medal record
Women's recurve archery
Representing Brazil
Pan American Championships
Silver medal – second place	2018 Medellín	Mixed team
Bronze medal – third place	2018 Medellín	Team

Marina Canetta Gobbi (born 1 April 1989 in São Paulo) is a Brazilian recurve archer. She competed in the archery competition at the 2016 Summer Olympics in Rio de Janeiro.
