= South Korea at the 2020 Summer Olympics =

- IOC code: KOR
- NOC: Korean Olympic Committee
- Website: www.sports.or.kr (in Korean and English)

in Tokyo, Japan July 23, 2021 – August 8, 2021
- Competitors: 237 in 29 sports
- Flag bearers (opening): Kim Yeon-koung; Hwang Sun-woo
- Flag bearer (closing): Jun Woong-tae
- Medals Ranked 16th: Gold 6 Silver 4 Bronze 10 Total 20

Summer Olympics appearances (overview)
- 1948; 1952; 1956; 1960; 1964; 1968; 1972; 1976; 1980; 1984; 1988; 1992; 1996; 2000; 2004; 2008; 2012; 2016; 2020; 2024; 2028

South Korea competed at the 2020 Summer Olympics in Tokyo. Originally scheduled to take place from 24 July to 9 August 2020, the Games were postponed to 23 July to 8 August 2021, because of the COVID-19 pandemic.

== Medalists ==
Medal	Name	Sport	Event	Date
Gold	Kim Je-deok; An San	Archery	Mixed team	24 July
Gold	An San; Jang Min-hee; Kang Chae-young	Archery	Women's team	25 July
Gold	Kim Je-deok; Kim Woo-jin; Oh Jin-hyek	Archery	Men's team	26 July
Gold	Oh Sang-uk; Kim Jun-ho; Kim Jung-hwan; Gu Bon-gil	Fencing	Men's team sabre	28 July
Gold	An San	Archery	Women's individual	30 July
Gold	Shin Jea-hwan	Gymnastics	Men's vault	2 August
Silver	Choi In-jeong; Kang Young-mi; Lee Hye-in; Song Se-ra	Fencing	Women's team épée	27 July
Silver	Lee Da-bin	Taekwondo	Women's +67 kg	27 July
Silver	Cho Gu-ham	Judo	Men's 100 kg	29 July
Silver	Kim Min-jung	Shooting	Women's 25 metre pistol	30 July
Bronze	Kim Jung-hwan	Fencing	Men's sabre	24 July
Bronze	Jang Jun	Taekwondo	Men's 58 kg	24 July
Bronze	An Baul	Judo	Men's 66 kg	25 July
Bronze	An Chang-rim	Judo	Men's 73 kg	26 July
Bronze	In Kyo-don	Taekwondo	Men's +80 kg	27 July
Bronze	Kweon Young-jun; Ma Se-geon; Park Sang-young; Song Jae-ho	Fencing	Men's team épée	30 July
Bronze	Choi Soo-yeon; Kim Ji-yeon; Yoon Ji-su; Seo Ji-yeon	Fencing	Women's team sabre	31 July
Bronze	Yeo Seo-jeong	Gymnastics	Women's vault	1 August
Bronze	Kim So-yeong; Kong Hee-yong	Badminton	Women's doubles	2 August
Bronze	Jun Woong-tae	Modern pentathlon	Men's individual	7 August

Medals by sport
Sport	1st place, gold medalist(s)	2nd place, silver medalist(s)	3rd place, bronze medalist(s)	Total
Archery	4	0	0	4
Badminton	0	0	1	1
Fencing	1	1	3	5
Gymnastics	1	0	1	2
Judo	0	1	2	3
Modern pentathlon	0	0	1	1
Shooting	0	1	0	1
Taekwondo	0	1	2	3
Total	6	4	10	20

== Competitors ==
The following is the list of number of competitors in the Games:

Sport	Men	Women	Total
Archery	3	3	6
Athletics	5	2	7
Badminton	3	7	10
Baseball	24	—N/a	24
Basketball	0	12	12
Boxing	0	2	2
Canoeing	1	0	1
Cycling	0	2	2
Diving	3	2	5
Equestrian	1	0	1
Fencing	9	9	18
Football	22	0	22
Golf	2	4	6
Gymnastics	5	2	7
Handball	0	14	14
Karate	1	0	1
Judo	7	7	14
Modern pentathlon	2	2	4
Rowing	0	1	1
Rugby sevens	13	0	13
Sailing	4	0	4
Shooting	7	8	15
Sport climbing	1	1	2
Swimming	7	5	12
Table tennis	3	3	6
Taekwondo	3	3	6
Tennis	1	0	1
Volleyball	0	12	12
Weightlifting	3	4	7
Wrestling	2	0	2
Total	132	105	237

== Archery ==
South Korean archers qualified each for the men's and women's events by reaching the quarterfinal stage of their respective team recurves at the 2019 World Archery Championships in 's-Hertogenbosch, Netherlands.

The South Korean archery team for the rescheduled Games was announced on 24 April 2021, including London 2012 gold medalist Oh Jin-hyek and Rio 2016 Olympian and former world record holder Kim Woo-jin.

Men

Athlete	Event	Ranking round		Round of 64	Round of 32	Round of 16	Quarterfinals	Semifinals	Final / BM	
Athlete	Event	Score	Seed	Opposition Score	Opposition Score	Opposition Score	Opposition Score	Opposition Score	Opposition Score	Rank
Kim Je-deok	Individual	688	1	David (MAW); W 6–0	Unruh (GER); L 3–7	Did not advance				
Oh Jin-hyek	Individual	681	3	Hammed (TUN); W 6–0	Das (IND); L 5–6	Did not advance				
Kim Woo-jin	Individual	680	4	Balogh (HUN); W 6–0	Plihon (FRA); W 6–2	Mohamad (MAS); W 6–0	Tang C-c (TPE); L 4–6	Did not advance		
Kim Je-deok; Kim Woo-jin; Oh Jin-hyek	Team	2049	1	—N/a		Bye	India; W 6–0	Japan; W 5–4	Chinese Taipei; W 6–0	1st place, gold medalist(s)

Women

Athlete	Event	Ranking round		Round of 64	Round of 32	Round of 16	Quarterfinals	Semifinals	Final / BM	
Athlete	Event	Score	Seed	Opposition Score	Opposition Score	Opposition Score	Opposition Score	Opposition Score	Opposition Score	Rank
An San	Individual	680	1	Hourtou (CHA); W 6–2	dos Santos (BRA); W 7–1	Hayakawa (JPN); W 6–4	Kumari (IND); W 6–0	Brown (USA); W 6–5	Osipova (ROC); W 6–5	1st place, gold medalist(s)
Jang Min-hee	Individual	677	2	Adam (EGY); W 6–0	Nakamura (JPN); L 2–6	Did not advance				
Kang Chae-young	Individual	675	3	Espinosa (ECU); W 6–0	Marchenko (UKR); W 7–1	Anagöz (TUR); W 6–2	Osipova (ROC); L 1–7	Did not advance		
An San; Jang Min-hee; Kang Chae-young	Team	2032	1	—N/a		Bye	Italy; W 6–0	Belarus; W 5–1	ROC; W 6–0	1st place, gold medalist(s)

Mixed

Athlete	Event	Ranking round		Round of 16	Quarterfinals	Semifinals	Final / BM	
Athlete	Event	Score	Seed	Opposition Score	Opposition Score	Opposition Score	Opposition Score	Rank
Kim Je-deok; An San	Team	1368	1 Q	Bangladesh; W 6–0	India; W 6–2	Mexico; W 5–1	Netherlands; W 5–3	1st place, gold medalist(s)

== Athletics ==
South Korean athletes further achieved the entry standards, either by qualifying time or by world ranking, in the following track and field events (up to a maximum of 3 athletes in each event):

Key

- Note–Ranks given for track events are within the athlete's heat only
- Q = Qualified for the next round
- q = Qualified for the next round as a fastest loser or, in field events, by position without achieving the qualifying target
- NR = National record
- N/A = Round not applicable for the event
- Bye = Athlete not required to compete in round

Track & road events

Athlete	Event	Final	
Athlete	Event	Result	Rank
Choe Byeong-kwang	Men's 20 km walk	1:28:12	37
Oh Joo-han	Men's marathon	DNF	
Shim Jung-sub	Men's marathon	2:20:36	49
Ahn Seul-ki	Women's marathon	2:41:11	57
Choi Kyung-sun	Women's marathon	2:35:33	34

Field events

Athlete	Event	Qualification		Final	
Athlete	Event	Distance	Position	Distance	Position
Woo Sang-hyeok	Men's high jump	2.28	=9 q	2.35 NR	4
Jin Min-sub	Men's pole vault	5.50	19	Did not advance	

== Badminton ==
South Korea entered ten badminton players (three men and seven women) for the following events based on the BWF Race to Tokyo Rankings: two entries in the women's singles, one in the men's singles, two pairs in the women's doubles, and a pair each in the men's and mixed doubles.

Men

Athlete	Event	Group stage				Elimination	Quarterfinal	Semifinal	Final / BM	
Athlete	Event	Opposition Score	Opposition Score	Opposition Score	Rank	Opposition Score	Opposition Score	Opposition Score	Opposition Score	Rank
Heo Kwang-hee	Singles	Lam (USA); W (21–10, 21–15)	Momota (JPN); W (21–15, 21–19)	—N/a	1 Q	Bye	Cordón (GUA); L (13–21, 18–21)	Did not advance		
Choi Sol-gyu; Seo Seung-jae	Doubles	Chia / Soh (MAS); L (22–24, 15–21)	Ho-Shue / Yakura (CAN); W (21–14, 21–8)	Ahsan / Setiawan (INA); L (22–24, 21–13, 18–21)	3	—N/a	Did not advance			

Women

Athlete	Event	Group stage				Elimination	Quarterfinal	Semifinal	Final / BM	
Athlete	Event	Opposition Score	Opposition Score	Opposition Score	Rank	Opposition Score	Opposition Score	Opposition Score	Opposition Score	Rank
An Se-young	Singles	Azurmendi (ESP); W (21–13, 21–8)	Adesokan (NGR); W (21–3, 21–6)	—N/a	1 Q	Ongbamrungphan (THA); W (21–15, 21–15)	Chen Yf (CHN); L (18–21, 19–21)	Did not advance		
Kim Ga-eun	Singles	Gaitan (MEX); W (21–14, 21–9)	Yeo J M (SGP); W (21–13, 21–14)	—N/a	1 Q	Yamaguchi (JPN); L (17–21, 18–21)	Did not advance			
Kim So-yeong; Kong Hee-yong	Doubles	G Stoeva / S Stoeva (BUL); W (21–23, 21–12, 23–21)	Kititharakul / Prajongjai (THA); W (21–19, 24–22)	Chen Qc / Jia Yf (CHN); L (21–19, 16–21, 14–21)	2 Q	—N/a	Matsumoto / Nagahara (JPN); W (21–14, 14–21, 28–26)	Chen Qc / Jia Yf (CHN); L (15–21, 11–21)	Lee S-h/ Shin S-c (KOR); W (21–10, 21–17)	3rd place, bronze medalist(s)
Lee So-hee; Shin Seung-chan	Doubles	Mapasa / Somerville (AUS); W (21–9, 21–6)	Fruergaard / Thygesen (DEN); L (21–15, 19–21, 20–22)	Du Y / Li Yh (CHN); W (21–19, 21–12)	1 Q	—N/a	Piek / Seinen (NED); W (21–8, 21–17)	Polii / Rahayu (INA); L (19–21, 17–21)	Kim S-y/ Kong H-y (KOR); L (10–21, 17–21)	4

Mixed

Athlete	Event	Group stage				Quarterfinal	Semifinal	Final / BM	
Athlete	Event	Opposition Score	Opposition Score	Opposition Score	Rank	Opposition Score	Opposition Score	Opposition Score	Rank
Seo Seung-jae; Chae Yoo-jung	Doubles	Tabeling / Piek (NED); W (16–21, 21–15, 21–11)	Elgamal / Hany (EGY); W (21–7, 21–3)	Zheng Sw / Huang Yq (CHN); L (14–21, 17–21)	2 Q	Wang Yy / Huang Dp (CHN); L (9–21, 16–21)	Did not advance		

== Baseball ==
South Korea national baseball team qualified for the Olympics by advancing to the final match and securing an outright berth as the highest-ranked squad from Asia and Oceania, excluding the host nation Japan, at the 2019 WBSC Premier12 in Tokyo.

Summary

Team	Event	Group stage			Round 1	Round 2	Semifinal	Semifinal 2	Final / BM	
Team	Event	Opposition Result	Opposition Result	Rank	Opposition Result	Opposition Result	Opposition Result	Opposition Result	Opposition Result	Rank
South Korea men's	Men's tournament	Israel; W 6–5	United States; L 2–4	2 Q	Dominican Republic; W 4–3	Israel; W 11–1	Japan; L 2–5	United States; L 2–7	Dominican Republic; L 6–10	4

Team roster

The Korea Baseball Organization announced the team's final roster on June 15, 2021.

Player	No.	Pos.	Date of birth (age)	Team	League	Birthplace
Ko Young-pyo	1	P	September 16, 1991 (age 29)	(South Korea) KT Wiz	(South Korea) KBO League	(South Korea) Naju
Cho Sang-woo	11	P	September 4, 1994 (age 26)	(South Korea) Kiwoom Heroes	(South Korea) KBO League	(South Korea) Uijeongbu
Kim Jin-uk	15	P	July 5, 2002 (age 19)	(South Korea) Lotte Giants	(South Korea) KBO League	(South Korea) Pyeongtaek
Won Tae-in	18	P	April 6, 2000 (age 21)	(South Korea) Samsung Lions	(South Korea) KBO League	(South Korea) Daegu
Woo-suk Go	19	P	August 6, 1998 (age 22)	(South Korea) LG Twins	(South Korea) KBO League	(South Korea) Incheon
Seung-hwan Oh	21	P	July 15, 1982 (age 39)	(South Korea) Samsung Lions	(South Korea) KBO League	(South Korea) Jeongeup
Cha Woo-chan	23	P	May 31, 1987 (age 34)	(South Korea) LG Twins	(South Korea) KBO League	(South Korea) Gunsan
Park Se-woong	32	P	November 30, 1995 (age 25)	(South Korea) Lotte Giants	(South Korea) KBO League	(South Korea)
Lee Eui-lee	48	P	June 16, 2002 (age 19)	(South Korea) Kia Tigers	(South Korea) KBO League	(South Korea) Gwangju
Kim Min-woo	55	P	July 25, 1995 (age 25)	(South Korea) Hanwha Eagles	(South Korea) KBO League	(South Korea) Changwon
Choi Won-joon	61	P	July 25, 1995 (age 25)	(South Korea) Doosan Bears	(South Korea) KBO League	(South Korea) Seoul
Yang Eui-ji	25	C	June 5, 1987 (age 34)	(South Korea) NC Dinos	(South Korea) KBO League	(South Korea) Gwangju
Kang Min-ho	47	C	August 18, 1985 (age 36)	(South Korea) Samsung Lions	(South Korea) KBO League	(South Korea)
Oh Ji-hwan	2	IF	July 2, 1990 (age 31)	(South Korea) LG Twins	(South Korea) KBO League	(South Korea) Gunsan
Hyeseong Kim	3	IF	January 27, 1999 (age 22)	(South Korea) Kiwoom Heroes	(South Korea) KBO League	(South Korea) Koyang
Jae-gyun Hwang	10	IF	July 28, 1987 (age 35)	(South Korea) KT Wiz	(South Korea) KBO League	(South Korea) Seoul
Hur Kyoung-min	13	IF	August 26, 1990 (age 30)	(South Korea) Doosan Bears	(South Korea) KBO League	(South Korea)
Oh Jae-il	44	IF	October 29, 1986 (age 34)	(South Korea) Samsung Lions	(South Korea) KBO League	(South Korea) Guri
Choi Joo-hwan	53	IF	February 28, 1988 (age 33)	(South Korea) SSG Landers	(South Korea) KBO League	(South Korea)
Park Hae-min	17	OF	February 24, 1990 (age 31)	(South Korea) Samsung Lions	(South Korea) KBO League	(South Korea) Seoul
Hyun-soo Kim	22	OF	January 12, 1988 (age 33)	(South Korea) LG Twins	(South Korea) KBO League	(South Korea) Seoul
Park Kun-woo	37	OF	September 8, 1990 (age 30)	(South Korea) Doosan Bears	(South Korea) KBO League	(South Korea)
Jung-hoo Lee	51	OF	August 20, 1998 (age 22)	(South Korea) Kiwoom Heroes	(South Korea) KBO League	(Japan) Nagoya

Group play

Pos	Team	Pld	W	L	RF	RA	RD	PCT	GB	Qualification
1	United States	2	2	0	12	3	+9	1.000	—	Round 2
2	South Korea	2	1	1	8	9	−1	.500	1	Round 1 game #2
3	Israel	2	0	2	6	14	−8	.000	2	Round 1 game #1

Source: TOCOG and WBSC

29 July 19:00 Yokohama Stadium
Team	1	2	3	4	5	6	7	8	9	10	R	H	E
Israel	0	0	2	0	0	2	0	0	1	0	5	7	0
South Korea	0	0	0	2	0	0	3	0	0	1	6	11	0
WP: Oh Seung-hwan (1–0) LP: Jeremy Bleich (0–1); Home runs: ISR: Ian Kinsler (1), Ryan Lavarnway 2 (2); KOR: Oh Ji-hwan (1), Lee Jung-hoo (1), Hyun-soo Kim (1); Boxscore

31 July 19:00 Yokohama Stadium
Team	1	2	3	4	5	6	7	8	9	R	H	E
South Korea	1	0	0	0	0	0	0	0	1	2	5	0
United States	0	0	0	2	2	0	0	0	X	4	6	0
WP: Nick Martinez (1–0) LP: Ko Young-pyo (0–1) Sv: David Robertson (1); Home runs: KOR: None; USA: Triston Casas (1), Nick Allen (1); Boxscore

Round 1

1 August 19:00 Yokohama Stadium
Team	1	2	3	4	5	6	7	8	9	R	H	E
Dominican Republic	1	0	0	2	0	0	0	0	0	3	6	0
South Korea	1	0	0	0	0	0	0	0	3	4	12	1
WP: Oh Seung-hwan (2–0) LP: Luis Felipe Castillo (0–1); Home runs: DOM: Juan Francisco (1); KOR: None; Boxscore

Round 2

2 August 12:00 Yokohama Stadium
Team	1	2	3	4	5	6	7	8	9	R	H	E
Israel	0	0	0	0	1	0	0	X	X	1	3	2
South Korea (7)	1	2	0	0	7	0	1	X	X	11	18	0
WP: Cho Sang-woo (1–0) LP: Joey Wagman (0–2); Home runs: ISR: None; KOR: Oh Ji-hwan (2), Hyun-soo Kim (2); Boxscore

Semifinals

4 August 19:00 Yokohama Stadium
Team	1	2	3	4	5	6	7	8	9	R	H	E
South Korea	0	0	0	0	0	2	0	0	0	2	7	1
Japan	0	0	1	0	1	0	0	3	X	5	9	1
WP: Hiromi Itoh (1–0) LP: Go Woo-suk (0–1) Sv: Ryoji Kuribayashi (2); Boxscore

5 August 19:00 Yokohama Stadium
Team	1	2	3	4	5	6	7	8	9	R	H	E
South Korea	0	0	0	0	1	0	1	0	0	2	7	0
United States	0	1	0	1	0	5	0	0	X	7	9	1
WP: Ryder Ryan (1–0) LP: Lee Eui-lee (0–1); Home runs: KOR: None; USA: Jamie Westbrook (1); Boxscore

Bronze medal game

7 August 12:00 Yokohama Stadium
Team	1	2	3	4	5	6	7	8	9	R	H	E
Dominican Republic	4	0	0	0	1	0	0	5	0	10	14	0
South Korea	0	1	0	1	4	0	0	0	0	6	13	0
WP: Cristopher Mercedes (1–0) LP: Oh Seung-hwan (2–1) Sv: Jumbo Díaz (1); Home runs: DOM: Juan Francisco (2), Julio Rodríguez (1), Johan Mieses (2); KOR: Hyun-soo Kim (3); Boxscore

== Basketball ==
Summary

Team	Event	Group stage				Quarterfinal	Semifinal	Final / BM	
Team	Event	Opposition Score	Opposition Score	Opposition Score	Rank	Opposition Score	Opposition Score	Opposition Score	Rank
South Korea women's	Women's tournament	Spain; L 69–73	Canada; L 53–74	Serbia; L 61–65	4	Did not advance			

=== Women's tournament ===
South Korea women's basketball team qualified for the Olympics as one of three highest-ranked eligible squads from group B at the Belgrade meet of the 2020 FIBA Women's Olympic Qualifying Tournament, marking the country's recurrence to the sport for the first time in 12 years.

Team roster

The roster was announced on 23 June 2021.

South Korea women's national basketball team – 2020 Summer Olympics roster
Players
Coaches

Pos.	No.	Name	Age – Date of birth	Height	Club	Ctr.
PG	1	Shin Ji-hyun	25 – 12 September 1995	1.73 m (5 ft 8 in)	Bucheon Hana 1Q	(South Korea)
PF	2	Han Eom-ji	22 – 10 November 1998	1.79 m (5 ft 10 in)	Incheon S-Birds	(South Korea)
F	3	Kang Lee-seul	27 – 5 April 1994	1.80 m (5 ft 11 in)	Cheongju KB Stars	(South Korea)
G	4	Yoon Ye-bin	24 – 16 April 1997	1.80 m (5 ft 11 in)	Samsung Life Blueminx	(South Korea)
PG	5	An He-ji	24 – 12 February 1997	1.64 m (5 ft 5 in)	Busan BNK Sum	(South Korea)
G	7	Park Hye-jin	31 – 22 July 1990	1.78 m (5 ft 10 in)	Asan Woori Bank Wibee	(South Korea)
F	9	Park Ji-hyun	21 – 7 April 2000	1.85 m (6 ft 1 in)	Asan Woori Bank Wibee	(South Korea)
C	11	Bae Hye-yoon	32 – 10 June 1989	1.82 m (6 ft 0 in)	Samsung Life Blueminx	(South Korea)
F	13	Kim Jung-eun	33 – 7 September 1987	1.80 m (5 ft 11 in)	Asan Woori Bank Wibee	(South Korea)
C	19	Park Ji-su	22 – 6 December 1998	1.98 m (6 ft 6 in)	Las Vegas Aces	(United States)
F	23	Kim Dan-bi	31 – 27 February 1990	1.80 m (5 ft 11 in)	Incheon S-Birds	(South Korea)
F	31	Jin An	25 – 23 March 1996	1.85 m (6 ft 1 in)	Busan BNK Sum	(South Korea)

Head coach

- (South Korea) Chun Joo-weon

Assistant coach(es)

- (South Korea) Lee Mi-sun

Legend

- Club – describes last
  club before the tournament
- Age – describes age
  on 26 July 2021

Group play

Pos	Team	Pld	W	L	PF	PA	PD	Pts	Qualification
1	Spain	3	3	0	234	205	+29	6	Quarterfinals
2	Serbia	3	2	1	207	214	−7	5	Quarterfinals
3	Canada	3	1	2	208	201	+7	4	
4	South Korea	3	0	3	183	212	−29	3	

Source: TOCOG and FIBA
Rules for classification: 1) classification points; 2) head-to-head results; 3) head-to-head game points difference; 4) head-to-head number of game points scored.

26 July 2021
10:00
v

Boxscore

South Korea	69–73	Spain
Scoring by quarter: 15–16, 20–17, 18–21, 16–19
Pts: Kang 26; Rebs: Park Ji-s. 10; Asts: Park H. 5		Pts: Ndour 28; Rebs: Gil 14; Asts: Ouviña 8

Saitama Super Arena, Saitama
Referees: Ferdinand Pascual (PHI), Andreia Silva (BRA), Kingsley Ojeaburu (NGR)

29 July 2021
10:00
v

Boxscore

Canada	74–53	South Korea
Scoring by quarter: 16–15, 17–13, 16–11, 25–14
Pts: Carleton 18; Rebs: Achonwa 10; Asts: Achonwa 5		Pts: Park Ji-s. 15; Rebs: Park Ji-s. 11; Asts: three players 3

Saitama Super Arena, Saitama
Referees: Amy Bonner (USA), James Boyer (AUS), Gizella Györgyi (NOR)

1 August 2021
21:00
v

Boxscore

South Korea	61–65	Serbia
Scoring by quarter: 10–17, 14–15, 20–18, 17–15
Pts: Park Ji-h 17; Rebs: Park Ji-s. 11; Asts: Park Ji-h., Park Ji-s. 5		Pts: Crvendakić 15; Rebs: Vasić 10; Asts: three players 4

Saitama Super Arena, Saitama
Referees: Ferdinand Pascual (PHI), Amy Bonner (USA), Andreia Silva (BRA)

== Boxing ==
South Korea entered two female boxers for the first time into the Olympic tournament. Im Ae-ji (women's featherweight) and defending Asian Games champion Oh Yeon-ji (women's lightweight) secured the spots on the South Korean squad by advancing to the semifinal match of their respective weight divisions at the 2020 Asia & Oceania Qualification Tournament in Amman, Jordan.

Athlete	Event	Round of 32	Round of 16	Quarterfinals	Semifinals	Final	
Athlete	Event	Opposition Result	Opposition Result	Opposition Result	Opposition Result	Opposition Result	Rank
Im Ae-ji	Women's featherweight	Bye	Nicolson (AUS); L 1–4	Did not advance			
Oh Yeon-ji	Women's lightweight	Bye	Potkonen (FIN); L 1–4	Did not advance			

== Canoeing ==
=== Sprint ===
South Korea qualified a single boat (men's K-1 200 m) for the Games by winning the gold medal at the 2021 Asian Canoe Sprint Qualification Regatta in Pattaya, Thailand.

Athlete	Event	Heats		Quarterfinals		Semifinals		Final	
Athlete	Event	Time	Rank	Time	Rank	Time	Rank	Time	Rank
Cho Kwang-hee	Men's K-1 200 m	35.738	3 QF	35.048	1 SF	36.094	6 FB	36.440	13

Qualification Legend: FA = Qualify to final (medal); FB = Qualify to final B (non-medal); SF = Qualify to semifinal; QF = Qualify to quarterfinal

== Cycling ==
=== Road ===
South Korea entered one rider to compete in the women's Olympic road race, by securing an outright berth, as the highest-ranked cyclist, not yet qualified, at the 2019 Asian Championships in Tashkent, Uzbekistan.

Athlete	Event	Time	Rank
Na Ah-reum	Women's road race	4:01:08	38

=== Track ===
Following the completion of the 2020 UCI Track Cycling World Championships, South Korea entered one rider to compete in the women's sprint and keirin based on her final individual UCI Olympic rankings.

Sprint

Athlete	Event	Qualification		Round 1	Repechage 1	Round 2	Repechage 2	Round 3	Repechage 3	Quarterfinals	Semifinals	Final	
Athlete	Event	Time Speed (km/h)	Rank	Opposition Rank	Opposition Rank	Opposition Rank	Opposition Rank	Opposition Rank	Opposition Rank	Opposition Rank	Opposition Rank	Opposition Rank	Rank
Lee Hye-jin	Women's sprint	10.904; 66.031	21 Q	Gros (FRA); L	Godby (USA); Shmeleva (ROC); L	Did not advance							

Keirin

Athlete	Event	Round 1	Repechage	Quarterfinals	Semifinals	Final
Athlete	Event	Rank	Rank	Rank	Rank	Rank
Lee Hye-jin	Women's keirin	3 R	3	Did not advance		

== Diving ==
South Korean divers qualified for five individual spots and the men's synchronized springboard team at the Games through the 2019 FINA World Championships and the 2021 FINA Diving World Cup.

Athlete	Event	Preliminary		Semifinal		Final	
Athlete	Event	Points	Rank	Points	Rank	Points	Rank
Kim Yeong-nam	Men's 3 m springboard	286.80	28	Did not advance			
Kim Yeong-taek	Men's 10 m platform	366.80	18 Q	374.90	15	Did not advance	
Woo Ha-ram	Men's 3 m springboard	452.45	5 Q	403.15	12 Q	481.85	4
Woo Ha-ram	Men's 10 m platform	427.25	7 Q	374.50	16	Did not advance	
Kim Yeong-nam; Woo Ha-ram	Men's 10 m synchronized platform	—N/a				396.12	7
Kim Su-ji	Women's 3 m springboard	304.20	7 Q	283.90	15	Did not advance	
Kwon Ha-lim	Women's 10 m platform	278.00	19	Did not advance			

== Equestrian ==
South Korea entered one dressage rider into the Olympic equestrian competition, by finishing in the top two, outside the group selection, of the individual FEI Olympic Rankings for Group G (South East Asia and Oceania).

=== Dressage ===
Athlete	Horse	Event	Grand Prix		Grand Prix Freestyle		Overall	
Athlete	Horse	Event	Score	Rank	Technical	Artistic	Score	Rank
Kim Dong-seon	Belstaff	Individual	63.447	55	Did not advance			

Qualification Legend: Q = Qualified for the final; q = Qualified for the final as a lucky loser

== Fencing ==
South Korean fencers qualified a full squad each in the men's and women's team sabre and women's team épée at the Games by finishing among the top four nations in the FIE Olympic Team Rankings, while the men's épée team claimed the spot each as the highest-ranked nation from Asia outside the world's top four. 2018 Asian Games men's foil champion Lee Kwang-hyun and two-time Olympian Jeon Hee-sook (women's foil) earned additional places on the South Korean team as one of the two highest-ranked fencers vying for qualification from Asia and Oceania in their respective individual events of the FIE Adjusted Official Rankings.

Men

Athlete	Event	Round of 64	Round of 32	Round of 16	Quarterfinal	Semifinal	Final	
Athlete	Event	Opposition Score	Opposition Score	Opposition Score	Opposition Score	Opposition Score	Opposition Score	Rank
Kweon Young-jun	Épée	Bye	Verwijlen (NED); L 10–15	Did not advance				
Ma Se-geon	Épée	Petrov (KGZ); L 7–15	Did not advance					
Park Sang-young	Épée	Bye	Hoyle (USA); W 15–10	Minobe (JPN); W 15–6	Siklósi (HUN); L 12–15	Did not advance		
Kweon Young-jun; Ma Se-geon; Park Sang-young; Song Jae-ho	Team épée	—N/a		Bye	Switzerland; W 44–39	Japan; L 38–45	China; W 45–42	3rd place, bronze medalist(s)
Lee Kwang-hyun	Foil	Bye	Borodachev (ROC); L 14–15	Did not advance				
Gu Bon-gil	Sabre	Bye	Szabo (GER); L 8–15	Did not advance				
Kim Jung-hwan	Sabre	Bye	Lokhanov (ROC); W 15–11	Dershwitz (USA); W 15–9	Ibragimov (ROC); W 15–14	Samele (ITA); L 12–15	Bazadze (GEO); W 15–11	3rd place, bronze medalist(s)
Oh Sang-uk	Sabre	Bye	Mackiewicz (USA); W 15–7	Amer (EGY); W 15–9	Bazadze (GEO); L 13–15	Did not advance		
Gu Bon-gil; Kim Jung-hwan; Oh Sang-uk; Kim Jun-ho	Team sabre	—N/a		Bye	Egypt; W 45–39	Germany; W 45–42	Italy; W 45–26	1st place, gold medalist(s)

Women

Athlete	Event	Round of 64	Round of 32	Round of 16	Quarterfinal	Semifinal	Final	
Athlete	Event	Opposition Score	Opposition Score	Opposition Score	Opposition Score	Opposition Score	Opposition Score	Rank
Choi In-jeong	Épée	Bye	Murtazaeva (ROC); L 11–15	Did not advance				
Kang Young-mi	Épée	Bye	Sato (JPN); L 14–15	Did not advance				
Song Se-ra	Épée	Bye	Holmes (USA); W 15–13	Popescu (ROU); L 6–15	Did not advance			
Choi In-jeong; Kang Young-mi; Song Se-ra; Lee Hye-in	Team épée	—N/a			United States; W 38–33	China; W 38–29	Estonia; L 32–36	2nd place, silver medalist(s)
Jeon Hee-sook	Foil	Bye	Azuma (JPN); W 11–10	Chen Qy (CHN); W 14–11	Deriglazova (ROC); L 7–15	Did not advance		
Choi Soo-yeon	Sabre	Bye	Berder (FRA); W 15–11	Márton (HUN); L 12–15	Did not advance			
Kim Ji-yeon	Sabre	Bye	Hafez (EGY); W 15–4	Zagunis (USA); L 12–15	Did not advance			
Yoon Ji-su	Sabre	Bye	Criscio (ITA); W 15–11	Dayibekova (UZB); L 12–15	Did not advance			
Choi Soo-yeon; Kim Ji-yeon; Yoon Ji-su; Seo Ji-yeon	Team sabre	—N/a		Bye	Hungary; W 45–40	ROC; L 26–45	Italy; W 45–42	3rd place, bronze medalist(s)

== Football ==
Summary

Key:

- A.E.T – After extra time.
- P – Match decided by penalty-shootout.

Team	Event	Group Stage				Quarterfinal	Semifinal	Final / BM	
Team	Event	Opposition Score	Opposition Score	Opposition Score	Rank	Opposition Score	Opposition Score	Opposition Score	Rank
South Korea men's	Men's tournament	New Zealand; L 0–1	Romania; W 4–0	Honduras; W 6–0	1 Q	Mexico; L 3–6	Did not advance		

=== Men's tournament ===
South Korea men's football team qualified for the Olympics by advancing to the final match of the 2020 AFC U-23 Championship in Thailand.

Team roster

South Korea's final squad was announced on 2 July 2021.

Head coach: Kim Hak-bum

No.	Pos.	Player	Date of birth (age)	Caps	Goals	Club
1	GK	Song Bum-keun	15 October 1997 (aged 23)	19	0	(Korea Football Association) Jeonbuk Hyundai Motors
2	DF	Lee You-hyeon	8 February 1997 (aged 24)	15	0	(Korea Football Association) Jeonbuk Hyundai Motors
3	DF	Kim Jae-woo	6 February 1998 (aged 23)	10	1	(Korea Football Association) Daegu
4	DF	Park Ji-soo*	13 June 1994 (aged 27)	0	0	(Korea Football Association) Gimcheon Sangmu
5	DF	Jeong Tae-wook	16 May 1997 (aged 24)	19	2	(Korea Football Association) Daegu
6	MF	Jeong Seung-won	27 February 1997 (aged 24)	13	0	(Korea Football Association) Ulsan Hyundai
7	FW	Kwon Chang-hoon*	30 June 1994 (aged 27)	21	11	(German Football Association) SC Freiburg
8	MF	Lee Kang-in	19 February 2001 (aged 20)	3	0	(Royal Spanish Football Federation) Valencia
9	FW	Song Min-kyu	12 September 1999 (aged 21)	5	1	(Korea Football Association) Pohang Steelers
10	MF	Lee Dong-gyeong	20 September 1997 (aged 23)	14	10	(Korea Football Association) Ulsan Hyundai
11	FW	Lee Dong-jun	1 February 1997 (aged 24)	15	7	(Korea Football Association) Ulsan Hyundai
12	DF	Seol Young-woo	5 December 1998 (aged 22)	5	0	(Korea Football Association) Ulsan Hyundai
13	DF	Kim Jin-ya	30 June 1998 (aged 23)	26	1	(Korea Football Association) Seoul
14	MF	Kim Dong-hyun	11 June 1997 (aged 24)	15	0	(Korea Football Association) Gangwon
15	MF	Won Du-jae	18 November 1997 (aged 23)	13	0	(Korea Football Association) Ulsan Hyundai
16	FW	Hwang Ui-jo*	28 August 1992 (aged 28)	24	14	(French Football Federation) Bordeaux
17	FW	Um Won-sang	6 January 1999 (aged 22)	16	1	(Korea Football Association) Gwangju
18	GK	Ahn Joon-soo	28 January 1998 (aged 23)	5	0	(Korea Football Association) Busan IPark
19	DF	Kang Yoon-sung	1 July 1997 (aged 24)	13	0	(Korea Football Association) Jeju United
20	DF	Lee Sang-min (captain)	1 January 1998 (aged 23)	21	1	(Korea Football Association) Seoul E-Land
21	MF	Kim Jin-gyu	24 February 1997 (aged 24)	10	1	(Korea Football Association) Busan IPark
22	GK	An Chan-gi	6 April 1998 (aged 23)	4	0	(Korea Football Association) Suwon Samsung Bluewings

* Overage player.

Group play

Pos	Team	Pld	W	D	L	GF	GA	GD	Pts	Qualification
1	South Korea	3	2	0	1	10	1	+9	6	Advance to knockout stage
2	New Zealand	3	1	1	1	3	3	0	4	Advance to knockout stage
3	Romania	3	1	1	1	1	4	−3	4	
4	Honduras	3	1	0	2	3	9	−6	3	

Source: TOCOG and FIFA
Rules for classification: Group stage tiebreakers
22 July 2021
17:00

New Zealand	1–0	South Korea
Wood 70'	Report (TOCOG); Report (FIFA)

Kashima Stadium, Kashima
Referee: Victor Gomes (South Africa)

25 July 2021
20:00

Romania	0–4	South Korea
	Report (TOCOG); Report (FIFA)	Marin 27' (o.g.); Um Won-sang 59'; Lee Kang-in 84' (pen.), 90'

Kashima Stadium, Kashima
Referee: Jesús Valenzuela (Venezuela)

28 July 2021
17:30

South Korea	6–0	Honduras
Hwang Ui-jo 12' (pen.), 45+5', 52' (pen.); Won Du-jae 19' (pen.); Kim Jin-ya 64'; Lee Kang-in 82'	Report (TOCOG); Report (FIFA)

International Stadium Yokohama, Yokohama
Referee: Georgi Kabakov (Bulgaria)

Quarterfinal

31 July 2021
20:00

South Korea	3–6	Mexico
Lee Dong-gyeong 20', 51'; Hwang Ui-jo 90+1'	Report (TOCOG); Report (FIFA)	Martín 12', 54'; Romo 30'; Córdova 39' (pen.), 63'; Aguirre 84'

International Stadium Yokohama, Yokohama
Referee: Orel Grinfeld (Israel)

== Golf ==
South Korea entered two male and four female golfers into the Olympic tournament.

Athlete	Event	Round 1	Round 2	Round 3	Round 4	Total		
Athlete	Event	Score	Score	Score	Score	Score	Par	Rank
Im Sung-jae	Men's	70	73	63	68	274	−10	=22
Kim Si-woo	Men's	68	71	70	67	276	−8	=32
Ko Jin-young	Women's	68	67	71	68	274	−10	=9
Inbee Park	Women's	69	70	71	69	279	−5	=23
Kim Sei-young	Women's	69	69	68	68	274	−10	=9
Kim Hyo-joo	Women's	70	68	70	67	275	−9	=15

== Gymnastics ==
=== Artistic ===
South Korea qualified seven artistic gymnasts into the Olympic competition: a full men's team of four, which will compete in the team competition, as well as one man and two women competing as individuals. The men's squad claimed one of nine remaining spots in the team competition at the 2019 World Championships in Stuttgart, Germany (China, Russia, & Japan had already qualified at the 2018 World Championships), and Shin Jea-hwan qualified through the World Cup Series, finishing first in the standings on men's VT. On the women's side, Lee Yun-seo earned a berth through her placement in the all-around at the 2019 World Championships, while Yeo Seo-jeong, with her finish in the event finals on vault, secured an additional berth available for gymnasts who did not qualify through either the team or the all-around through the apparatus finals at the same event. The individual qualifiers, including those who qualified due to their performances on individual events, are eligible to compete in all events at the Olympics.

Men
Team

Athlete	Event	Qualification								Final							
Athlete	Event	Apparatus						Total	Rank	Apparatus						Total	Rank
Athlete	Event	F	PH	R	V	PB	HB	Total	Rank	F	PH	R	V	PB	HB	Total	Rank
Kim Han-sol	Team	14.900 Q	11.833	13.600	14.333	13.666	12.800	81.032	39	Did not advance							
Lee Jun-ho	Team	13.733	12.900	13.700	14.333	14.266	13.366	82.398	28 Q	Did not advance							
Ryu Sung-hyun	Team	15.066 Q	12.900	13.166	14.500	11.966	13.133	80.731	41	Did not advance							
Yang Hak-seon	Team	—N/a			14.366	—N/a		14.366	9	Did not advance							
Total	Team	43.699	37.633	40.466	43.799	39.898	39.299	244.794	11	Did not advance							

Individual

Athlete	Event	Qualification								Final							
Athlete	Event	Apparatus						Total	Rank	Apparatus						Total	Rank
Athlete	Event	F	PH	R	V	PB	HB	Total	Rank	F	PH	R	V	PB	HB	Total	Rank
Kim Han-sol	Floor	14.900	—N/a					14.900	5 Q	13.066	—N/a					13.066	8
Lee Jun-ho	All-around	See team results								13.966	12.766	13.466	13.800	14.166	12.300	80.464	22
Ryu Sung-hyun	Floor	15.066	—N/a					15.066	3 Q	14.233	—N/a					14.233	4
Shin Jea-hwan	Vault	—N/a			14.866	—N/a			1 Q	—N/a			14.783	—N/a			1st place, gold medalist(s)

Women

Athlete	Event	Qualification						Final					
Athlete	Event	Apparatus				Total	Rank	Apparatus				Total	Rank
Athlete	Event	V	UB	BB	F	Total	Rank	V	UB	BB	F	Total	Rank
Lee Yun-seo	All-around	13.400	14.333	12.841	12.966	53.540	29 Q	13.400	14.300	11.266	12.666	51.632	21
Yeo Seo-jeong	Vault	14.800	—N/a			14.800	5 Q	14.733	—N/a			14.733	3rd place, bronze medalist(s)

== Handball ==
Summary

Key:

- ET: After extra time
- P – Match decided by penalty-shootout.

Team	Event	Group Stage						Quarterfinal	Semifinal	Final / BM	
Team	Event	Opposition Score	Opposition Score	Opposition Score	Opposition Score	Opposition Score	Rank	Opposition Score	Opposition Score	Opposition Score	Rank
South Korea women's	Women's tournament	Norway; L 27–39	Netherlands; L 36–43	Japan; W 27–24	Montenegro; L 26–28	Angola; D 31–31	4 Q	Sweden; L 30–39	Did not advance		

=== Women's tournament ===
The South Korean women's handball team qualified for the Olympics by winning the gold medal at the 2019 Asian Qualification Tournament in Chuzhou, China.

Team roster

The squad was announced on 14 June 2021.

Head coach: Kang Jae-won

No.	Pos.	Name	Date of birth (age)	Height	App.	Goals	Club
1	GK	Ju Hui	4 November 1989 (aged 31)	1.80 m	40	0	(South Korea) Busan
10	P	Won Seon-pil	6 August 1994 (aged 26)	1.74 m	5	14	(South Korea) Incheon
11	RB	Ryu Eun-hee	24 February 1990 (aged 31)	1.79 m	83	297	(Hungary) Győri Audi ETO KC
12	GK	Jeong Jin-hui	24 March 1999 (aged 22)	1.80 m	5	0	(South Korea) Korea National Sport University
13	RW	Kim Yun-ji	16 January 2000 (aged 21)	1.70 m	0	0	(South Korea) Samcheok
15	LW	Choi Su-min	9 January 1990 (aged 31)	1.77 m	49	155	(South Korea) SK Sugar Gliders
17	LB	Sim Hae-in	31 October 1987 (aged 33)	1.78 m	64	117	(South Korea) Busan
19	P	Kang Eun-hye	17 April 1996 (aged 25)	1.86 m	8	21	(South Korea) Busan
21	LW	Jo Ha-rang	15 July 1991 (aged 30)	1.65 m	9	67	(South Korea) Daegu
22	P	Gim Bo-eun	8 December 1997 (aged 23)	1.76 m	5	9	(South Korea) Samcheok
23	CB	Lee Mi-gyeong	2 October 1991 (aged 29)	1.70 m	43	65	(South Korea) Busan
24	CB	Kang Kyung-min	8 November 1996 (aged 24)	1.65 m	12	30	(South Korea) Gwangju
25	RB	Jung Yu-ra	6 February 1992 (aged 29)	1.70 m	23	37	(South Korea) Daegu
27	LB	Kim Jin-yi	20 June 1993 (aged 28)	1.80 m	50	115	(South Korea) Busan
34	RW	Jung Ji-in	18 July 2000 (aged 21)	1.80 m	5	13	(South Korea) Korea National Sport University

Group play

Pos	Team	Pld	W	D	L	GF	GA	GD	Pts	Qualification
1	Norway	5	5	0	0	170	123	+47	10	Quarter-finals
2	Netherlands	5	4	0	1	169	143	+26	8	Quarter-finals
3	Montenegro	5	2	0	3	139	142	−3	4	Quarter-finals
4	South Korea	5	1	1	3	147	165	−18	3 (Note: South Korea 31–31 Angola)	Quarter-finals
5	Angola	5	1	1	3	130	156	−26	3	
6	Japan (H)	5	1	0	4	124	150	−26	2	

Source: Tokyo 2020 and IHF
Rules for classification: 1) Points; 2) Head-to-head points; 3) Head-to-head goal difference; 4) Head-to-head goals scored; 5) Goal difference; 6) Goals scored; 7) Draw.
(H) Hosts
Notes:

25 July 2021; 16:15	Norway	39–27	South Korea	Yoyogi National Gymnasium, Tokyo; Referees: Bonaventura, Bonaventura (FRA)
25 July 2021; 16:15	Brattset Dale 11	(18–10)	Sim 5	Yoyogi National Gymnasium, Tokyo; Referees: Bonaventura, Bonaventura (FRA)
25 July 2021; 16:15	5× (suspension)	Report	1× (yellow card) 2× (suspension)	Yoyogi National Gymnasium, Tokyo; Referees: Bonaventura, Bonaventura (FRA)

27 July 2021; 16:15	South Korea	36–43	Netherlands	Yoyogi National Gymnasium, Tokyo; Referees: Lah, Sok (SLO)
27 July 2021; 16:15	Ryu 10	(15–19)	Abbingh 6	Yoyogi National Gymnasium, Tokyo; Referees: Lah, Sok (SLO)
27 July 2021; 16:15	1× (yellow card) 2× (suspension)	Report	2× (yellow card) 7× (suspension)	Yoyogi National Gymnasium, Tokyo; Referees: Lah, Sok (SLO)

29 July 2021; 14:15	Japan	24–27	South Korea	Yoyogi National Gymnasium, Tokyo; Referees: Kurtagic, Wetterwik (SWE)
29 July 2021; 14:15	Kondo 7	(11–12)	Ryu 9	Yoyogi National Gymnasium, Tokyo; Referees: Kurtagic, Wetterwik (SWE)
29 July 2021; 14:15	1× (yellow card) 3× (suspension)	Report	3× (suspension)	Yoyogi National Gymnasium, Tokyo; Referees: Kurtagic, Wetterwik (SWE)

31 July 2021; 11:00	Montenegro	28–26	South Korea	Yoyogi National Gymnasium, Tokyo; Referees: El-Saied, El-Saied (EGY)
31 July 2021; 11:00	Radičević 6	(13–11)	Lee 10	Yoyogi National Gymnasium, Tokyo; Referees: El-Saied, El-Saied (EGY)
31 July 2021; 11:00	2× (yellow card) 4× (suspension)	Report	3× (suspension)	Yoyogi National Gymnasium, Tokyo; Referees: El-Saied, El-Saied (EGY)

2 August 2021; 09:00	South Korea	31–31	Angola	Yoyogi National Gymnasium, Tokyo; Referees: Bonaventura, Bonaventura (FRA)
2 August 2021; 09:00	Jung, Kang E. 7	(16–17)	Guialo 8	Yoyogi National Gymnasium, Tokyo; Referees: Bonaventura, Bonaventura (FRA)
2 August 2021; 09:00		Report	7× (suspension)	Yoyogi National Gymnasium, Tokyo; Referees: Bonaventura, Bonaventura (FRA)

Quarterfinal

4 August 2021; 17:00	Sweden	39–30	South Korea	Yoyogi National Gymnasium, Tokyo; Referees: Alpaidze, Berezkina (RUS)
4 August 2021; 17:00	three players 6	(21–13)	Kang K. 8	Yoyogi National Gymnasium, Tokyo; Referees: Alpaidze, Berezkina (RUS)
4 August 2021; 17:00	1× (yellow card) 3× (suspension)	Report	4× (suspension)	Yoyogi National Gymnasium, Tokyo; Referees: Alpaidze, Berezkina (RUS)

== Judo ==
Men

Athlete	Event	Round of 64	Round of 32	Round of 16	Quarterfinals	Semifinals	Repechage	Final	
Athlete	Event	Opposition Result	Opposition Result	Opposition Result	Opposition Result	Opposition Result	Opposition Result	Opposition Result	Rank
Kim Won-jin	−60 kg	—N/a	Bye	Takabatake (BRA); W 10–00	Smetov (KAZ); L 00–10	Did not advance	Chkhvimiani (GEO); W 10–00	Mkheidze (FRA); L 00–10	=5
An Ba-ul	−66 kg	—N/a	Bye	Chinchila (CRC); W 10–00	Gomboc (SLO); W 10–00	Margvelashvili (GEO); L 00–01	Bye	Lombardo (ITA); W 10–00	3rd place, bronze medalist(s)
An Chang-rim	−73 kg	Bye	Basile (ITA); W 01–00	Turaev (UZB); W 01–00	Butbul (ISR); W 01–00	Shavdatuashvili (GEO); L 00–10	Bye	Orujov (AZE); W 01–00	3rd place, bronze medalist(s)
Lee Sung-ho	−81 kg	Bye	Elias (LBN); W 10–00	Grigalashvili (GEO); L 00–10	Did not advance				
Gwak Dong-han	−90 kg	Bye	Anani (GHA); W 10–00	Trippel (GER); L 00–10	Did not advance				
Cho Gu-ham	−100 kg	—N/a	Bye	Kukolj (SRB); W 10–00	Frey (GER); W 01–00	Fonseca (POR); W 01–00	Bye	Wolf (JPN); L 00–10	2nd place, silver medalist(s)
Kim Min-jong	+100 kg	—N/a	Bye	Harasawa (JPN); L 00–10	Did not advance				

Women

Athlete	Event	Round of 32	Round of 16	Quarterfinals	Semifinals	Repechage	Final / BM	
Athlete	Event	Opposition Result	Opposition Result	Opposition Result	Opposition Result	Opposition Result	Opposition Result	Rank
Kang Yu-jeong	−48 kg	Štangar (SLO); L 01–10	Did not advance					
Park Da-sol	−52 kg	Cesar (GBS); W 11–00	Kuziutina (ROC); W 01–00	Buchard (FRA); L 00–10	Did not advance	Pupp (HUN); L 00–01	Did not advance	=7
Kim Ji-su	−57 kg	Roper (PAN); W 10–00	Cysique (FRA); L 00–01	Did not advance				
Han Hee-ju	−63 kg	Trstenjak (SLO); L 00–01	Did not advance					
Kim Seong-yeon	−70 kg	Sophina (CMR); W 10–00	Polleres (AUT); L 00–01	Did not advance				
Yoon Hyun-ji	−78 kg	Papadakis (USA); W 10–00	Powell (GBR); W 11–00	Steenhuis (NED); W 10–00	Malonga (FRA); L 00–10	Bye	Aguiar (BRA); L 00–10	=5
Han Mi-jin	+78 kg	Savelkouls (NED); W 01–00	Slutskaya (BLR); W 10–00	Kindzerska (AZE); L 00–11	Did not advance	Sayit (TUR); L 00–10	Did not advance	=7

Mixed

Athlete	Event	Round of 16	Quarterfinals	Semifinals	Repechage	Final / BM	
Athlete	Event	Opposition Result	Opposition Result	Opposition Result	Opposition Result	Opposition Result	Rank
An Chang-rim; Gwak Dong-han; Kim Min-jong; Han Mi-jin; Kim Ji-su; Kim Seong-yeon	Team	Mongolia; L 1–4	Did not advance				

== Karate ==
South Korea entered one karateka into the inaugural Olympic tournament. Park Hee-jun qualified directly for the men's kata category by finishing third in the final pool round at the 2021 World Olympic Qualification Tournament in Paris, France.

Kata

Athlete	Event	Elimination round		Ranking round		Final / BM	
Athlete	Event	Score	Rank	Score	Rank	Opposition Result	Rank
Park Hee-jun	Men's kata	25.62	3 Q	25.98	3 q	Sofuoğlu (TUR); L 26.14–27.26	5

== Modern pentathlon ==
South Korean athletes qualified for the following spots to compete in modern pentathlon. Rio 2016 Olympian Jun Woong-tae secured his selection in the men's race by winning the bronze medal and sealing one of three spots available at the 2019 UIPM World Championships in Budapest, Hungary. Meanwhile, Asian Games silver medalists Lee Ji-hun and Kim Se-hee confirmed places each in their respective events with gold-medal victories at the 2019 Asia & Oceania Championships in Kunming, China. Jung Jin-hwa replaces Lee Ji-hun.

Athlete	Event	Fencing (épée one touch)				Swimming (200 m freestyle)			Riding (show jumping)			Combined: shooting/running (10 m air pistol)/(3200 m)			Total points	Final rank
Athlete	Event	RR	BR	Rank	MP points	Time	Rank	MP points	Penalties	Rank	MP points	Time	Rank	MP Points	Total points	Final rank
Jun Woong-tae	Men's	21–14	0	9	226	1:57.23	6	316	11	11	289	11:01.84	7	639	1470	3rd place, bronze medalist(s)
Jung Jin-hwa	Men's	23–12	1	5	238	1:57.85	7	315	7	6	293	11:21.95	17	619	1466	4
Kim Se-hee	Women's	24–11	2	2	246	2:16.36	21	278	14	18	286	13:00.70	24	520	1330	11
Kim Sun-woo	Women's	19–16	0	14	214	2:16.36	21	278	16	21	284	13:07.80	27	513	1296	17

== Rowing ==
South Korea qualified one boat in the women's single sculls for the Games by finishing sixth in the A-final and securing the third of five berths available at the 2021 FISA Asia & Oceania Olympic Qualification Regatta in Tokyo, Japan.

Athlete	Event	Heats		Repechage		Quarterfinals		Semifinals		Final	
Athlete	Event	Time	Rank	Time	Rank	Time	Rank	Time	Rank	Time	Rank
Jeong Hye-jeong	Women's single sculls	8:12.15	5 R	8:26.73	2 QF	8:38.70	6 SC/D	8:06.32	6 FD	8:06.13	24

Qualification Legend: FA=Final A (medal); FB=Final B (non-medal); FC=Final C (non-medal); FD=Final D (non-medal); FE=Final E (non-medal); FF=Final F (non-medal); SA/B=Semifinals A/B; SC/D=Semifinals C/D; SE/F=Semifinals E/F; QF=Quarterfinals; R=Repechage

== Rugby sevens ==
Summary

Team	Event	Group stage				Quarterfinal	9–12th place Semifinal	11th place match	
Team	Event	Opposition Score	Opposition Score	Opposition Score	Rank	Opposition Score	Opposition Score	Opposition Score	Rank
South Korea men's	Men's tournament	New Zealand; L 5–50	Australia; L 5–42	Argentina; L 0–56	4	—N/a	Ireland; L 0–31	Japan; L 19–31	12

=== Men's tournament ===
South Korea national rugby sevens team qualified for the Games by winning the gold medal and securing a lone outright berth at the 2019 Asian Olympic Qualifying Tournament in Incheon, marking the country's debut in the sport.

Team roster

South Korea's 12-man squad plus one alternate was named on 6 July 2021.

Head coach: Seo Chun-oh

No.	Pos.	Player	Date of birth (age)	Events	Points
1	FW	Han Kun-kyu (c)	22 January 1987 (aged 34)	4	20
2	FW	Kim Hyun-soo	8 November 1988 (aged 32)	4	25
3	FW	Andre Jin Coquillard	15 January 1991 (aged 30)	2	10
4	BK	Chang Yong-heung	12 November 1993 (aged 27)	0	0
5	BK	Lee Seong-bae	7 April 1990 (aged 31)	3	13
6	BK	Kim Nam-uk	5 February 1990 (aged 31)	2	0
7	BK	Jang Jeong-min	10 November 1994 (aged 26)	2	27
8	FW	Jang Seong-min	22 August 1992 (aged 28)	2	5
9	BK	Park Wan-yong (c)	2 June 1984 (aged 37)	5	25
10	FW	Lee Jin-kyu	4 July 1994 (aged 27)	1	0
11	FW	Choi Seong-deok	31 May 1999 (aged 22)	0	0
12	BK	Jeong Yeon-sik	8 May 1993 (aged 28)	1	0
13	BK	Kim Gwong-min	2 April 1988 (aged 33)	0	0

Group play

Pos	Team	Pld	W	D	L	PF	PA	PD	Pts	Qualification
1	New Zealand	3	3	0	0	99	31	+68	9	Quarter-finals
2	Argentina	3	2	0	1	99	54	+45	7	Quarter-finals
3	Australia	3	1	0	2	73	48	+25	5	Quarter-finals
4	South Korea	3	0	0	3	10	148	−138	3	

Source: Tokyo 2020 and World Rugby
Rules for classification: 1) Points; 2) Head-to-head result; 3) Point difference; 4) Points scored.

26 July 2021
10:00

New Zealand	50–5	South Korea
Try: Knewstubb 2' c Mikkelson (2) 7' c, 8' m Penalty try 8'; Warbrick (2) 10' c, 14' m Nanai-Seturo 12' m McGarvey-Black 13' c Con: Knewstubb (2/3) 2', 7'; McGarvey-Black (2/3) 10', 13'; Baker (0/1)	(Tokyo 2020)	Try: Jeong 5' m Con: Lee (0/1)

Tokyo Stadium, Tokyo
Attendance: 0
Referee: Sam Grove-White (Scotland)

26 July 2021
18:00

Australia	42–5	South Korea
Try: Longbottom 1' c Roache 2' c Miller (2) 7' c, 8' c Malouf 10' c Pietsch 13' c Con: Longbottom (4/4) 1', 2', 7', 10'; Miller (1/1) 8'; Coward (1/1) 13'	(Tokyo 2020)	Try: Coquillard 9' m Con: Coquillard (0/1)

Tokyo Stadium, Tokyo
Attendance: 0
Referee: Nehuén Jauri Rivero (Argentina)

27 July 2021
10:00

Argentina	56–0	South Korea
Try: Bazán 1' c Osadczuk 2' c Mare 4' c González 7' c Isgro 8' c Schulz 9' c Revol 12' c Mendy 13' c Con: Mare (5/5) 1', 3', 4', 7', 8'; Revol (2/2) 9', 13' del Mestre (1/1) 12'	(Tokyo 2020)

Tokyo Stadium, Tokyo
Attendance: 0
Referee: Matthew Rodden (Hong Kong)

9–12th place playoff

27 July 2021
16:30

Ireland	31–0	South Korea
Try: Roche 1' m Conroy (2) 2' m, 13' c Mullin (2) 11' c, 14' c Con: Roche (0/2); Dardis (3/3) 12', 13', 14'	(Tokyo 2020)

Tokyo Stadium, Tokyo
Attendance: 0
Referee: Francisco González (Uruguay)

11th place match

28 July 2021
9:00

South Korea	19–31	Japan
Try: Coquillard 1' c Jang 4' m Jeong 10' c Con: Coquillard (2/3) 1', 10'	(Tokyo 2020)	Try: Tuqiri 2' c Hikosaka 5' c Kano 7' m Matsui 8' c Hano 11' m Con: Kano (3/4) 2', 6', 8'; Fujita (0/1)

Tokyo Stadium, Tokyo
Attendance: 0
Referee: Richard Haughton (England)

== Sailing ==
South Korean sailors qualified one boat in each of the following classes through the 2018 Sailing World Championships, the class-associated Worlds, the 2018 Asian Games, and the continental regattas.

Athlete	Event	Race													Net points	Final rank
Athlete	Event	1	2	3	4	5	6	7	8	9	10	11	12	M*	Net points	Final rank
Cho Won-woo	Men's RS:X	22	15	21	22	7	~~26~~	10	14	9	11	18	18	EL	167	17
Ha Jee-min	Men's Laser	20	8	~~26~~	7	7	10	6	14	10	6	—N/a		10	98	7
Park Gun-woo; Cho Sung-min	Men's 470	~~17~~	16	14	15	3	17	15	14	1	9	—N/a		EL	104	14

M = Medal race; EL = Eliminated – did not advance into the medal race

== Shooting ==
South Korean shooters achieved quota places for the following events by virtue of their best finishes at the 2018 ISSF World Championships, the 2019 ISSF World Cup series, and Asian Championships, as long as they obtained a minimum qualifying score (MQS) by May 31, 2020.

Fourteen shooters (seven per gender) were selected to the South Korean roster at the end of the national trials, with pistol ace and four-time gold medalist Jin Jong-oh leading them to his fifth consecutive Games and Kim Min-ji setting her historic comeback to the Games for the first time in 13 years. Meanwhile, Nam Tae-yun earned a direct place in the men's 10 m air rifle for the rescheduled Games as the highest-ranked shooter vying for qualification in the ISSF World Olympic Rankings of 6 June 2021.

Men

Athlete	Event	Qualification		Final	
Athlete	Event	Points	Rank	Points	Rank
Han Dae-yoon	25 m rapid fire pistol	585	3 Q	22	4
Jin Jong-oh	10 m air pistol	576	15	Did not advance	
Kim Mo-se	10 m air pistol	579	6 Q	115.8	8
Kim Sang-do	10 m air rifle	625.1	24	Did not advance	
Kim Sang-do	50 m rifle 3 positions	1164	24	Did not advance	
Lee Jong-jun	Skeet	121	13	Did not advance	
Nam Tae-yun	10 m air rifle	627.2	12	Did not advance	
Song Jong-ho	25 m rapid fire pistol	DSQ		Did not advance	

Women

Athlete	Event	Qualification		Final	
Athlete	Event	Points	Rank	Points	Rank
Bae Sang-hee	50 m rifle 3 positions	1164	20	Did not advance	
Cho Eun-young	50 m rifle 3 positions	1155	32	Did not advance	
Choo Ga-eun	10 m air pistol	573	16	Did not advance	
Kim Bo-mi	10 m air pistol	570	24	Did not advance	
Kim Min-jung	25 m pistol	584	8 Q	38 (+1) OR	2nd place, silver medalist(s)
Kwak Jung-hye	25 m pistol	579	21	Did not advance	
Kwon Eun-ji	10 m air rifle	630.9	4 Q	145.4	7
Park Hee-moon	10 m air rifle	631.7	2 Q	119.1	8

Mixed

Athlete	Event	Qualification		Semifinal		Final / BM	
Athlete	Event	Points	Rank	Points	Rank	Opposition Result	Rank
Kim Sang-do; Park Hee-moon	10 m air rifle team	623.3	20	Did not advance			
Nam Tae-yun; Kwon Eun-ji	10 m air rifle team	630.5	3 Q	417.5	3 q	Kamenskiy / Karimova (ROC); L 9–17	4
Jin Jong-oh; Choo Ga-eun	10 m air pistol team	575	9	Did not advance			
Kim Mo-se; Kim Bo-mi	10 m air pistol team	573	11	Did not advance			

== Sport climbing ==
South Korea entered two sport climbers into the Olympic tournament. With the IFSC Asian Championships cancelled because of the travel restrictions brought by the COVID-19 pandemic, Chon Jong-won and Seo Chae-hyun received the unused berths respectively, as the continent's highest-ranked male and female sport climber vying for qualification, at the 2019 Worlds in Hachioji, Japan.

Athlete	Event	Qualification									Final								
Athlete	Event	Speed		Boulder		Lead			Total	Rank	Speed		Boulder		Lead			Total	Rank
Athlete	Event	Best	Place	Result	Place	Hold	Time	Place	Total	Rank	Best	Place	Result	Place	Hold	Time	Place	Total	Rank
Chon Jong-won	Men's	6.21	5	1T3z 3 10	10	26+	2:34	16	800.00	10	Did not advance								
Seo Chae-hyun	Women's	10.01	17	2T4z 5 5	5	40+	—	1	85.00	2 Q	9.85	8	0T0z 0 0	7	35+	—	2	112	8

== Swimming ==
South Korean swimmers further achieved qualifying standards in the following events (up to a maximum of 2 swimmers in each event at the Olympic Qualifying Time (OQT), and potentially 1 at the Olympic Selection Time (OST)):

Men

Athlete	Event	Heat		Semifinal		Final	
Athlete	Event	Time	Rank	Time	Rank	Time	Rank
Cho Sung-jae	100 m breaststroke	59.99	20	Did not advance			
Cho Sung-jae	200 m breaststroke	2:10.17	19	Did not advance			
Hwang Sun-woo	50 m freestyle	22.74	39	Did not advance			
Hwang Sun-woo	100 m freestyle	47.97	6 Q	47.56 AS	4 Q	47.82	5
Hwang Sun-woo	200 m freestyle	1:44.62	1 Q	1:45.53	6 Q	1:45.26	7
Lee Ho-joon	400 m freestyle	3:53.23	26	—N/a		Did not advance	
Lee Ju-ho	100 m backstroke	53.84	=20	Did not advance			
Lee Ju-ho	200 m backstroke	1:56.77	4 Q	1:56.93	11	Did not advance	
Moon Seung-woo	100 m butterfly	53.59	47	Did not advance			
Moon Seung-woo	200 m butterfly	1:58.09	28	Did not advance			
Hwang Sun-woo; Kim Woo-min; Lee Ho-joon; Lee Yoo-yeon	4 × 200 m freestyle relay	7:15.03	13	—N/a		Did not advance	

Women

Athlete	Event	Heat		Semifinal		Final	
Athlete	Event	Time	Rank	Time	Rank	Time	Rank
An Se-hyeon	100 m butterfly	59.32	23	Did not advance			
Han Da-kyung	400 m freestyle	4:16.49	21	—N/a		Did not advance	
Han Da-kyung	800 m freestyle	8:46.66	28	—N/a		Did not advance	
Han Da-kyung	1500 m freestyle	16:33.59	28	—N/a		Did not advance	
Kim Seo-yeong	200 m individual medley	2:11.54	15 Q	2:11.38	12	Did not advance	
Lee Eun-ji	100 m backstroke	1:00.14	20	Did not advance			
Lee Eun-ji	200 m backstroke	2:11.72	18	Did not advance			
An Se-hyeon; Han Da-kyung; Jung Hyun-young; Kim Seo-yeong	4 × 200 m freestyle relay	8:11.16	14	—N/a		Did not advance	

== Table tennis ==
South Korea entered six athletes into the table tennis competition at the Games. The men's and women's teams secured one of nine available places, respectively, at the 2020 World Olympic Qualification Event in Gondomar, Portugal, permitting a maximum of two starters to compete each in the men's and women's singles tournament.

Men

Athlete	Event	Preliminary	Round 1	Round 2	Round 3	Round of 16	Quarterfinals	Semifinals	Final / BM	
Athlete	Event	Opposition Result	Opposition Result	Opposition Result	Opposition Result	Opposition Result	Opposition Result	Opposition Result	Opposition Result	Rank
Jang Woo-jin	Singles	Bye			Drinkhall (GBR); W 4–1	Calderano (BRA); L 3–4	Did not advance			
Jeoung Young-sik	Singles	Bye			Gionis (GRE); W 4–3	Boll (GER); W 4–1	Fan Zd (CHN); L 0–4	Did not advance		
Jang Woo-jin; Jeoung Young-sik; Lee Sang-su	Team	—N/a				Slovenia; W 3–1	Brazil; W 3–0	China; L 0–3	Japan; L 1–3	4

Women

Athlete	Event	Preliminary	Round 1	Round 2	Round 3	Round of 16	Quarterfinals	Semifinals	Final / BM	
Athlete	Event	Opposition Result	Opposition Result	Opposition Result	Opposition Result	Opposition Result	Opposition Result	Opposition Result	Opposition Result	Rank
Jeon Ji-hee	Singles	Bye			Yuan (FRA); W 4–3	Liu (AUT); W 4–1	Ito (JPN); L 0–4	Did not advance		
Shin Yu-bin	Singles	Bye	Edghill (GUY); W 4–0	Ni Xl (LUX); W 4–3	Doo H K (HKG); L 2–4	Did not advance				
Choi Hyo-joo; Jeon Ji-hee; Shin Yu-bin	Team	—N/a				Poland; W 3–0	Germany; L 2–3	Did not advance		

Mixed

Athlete	Event	Round of 16	Quarterfinals	Semifinals	Final / BM	
Athlete	Event	Opposition Result	Opposition Result	Opposition Result	Opposition Result	Rank
Lee Sang-su; Jeon Ji-hee	Doubles	Assar / Meshref (EGY); W 4–1	Lin Y-j / Cheng I-c (TPE); L 2–4	Did not advance		

== Taekwondo ==
South Korea entered six athletes into the taekwondo competition at the Games. Jang Jun (men's 58 kg), double Olympic medalist Lee Dae-hoon (men's 68 kg), In Kyo-don (men's +80 kg), and world champions Sim Jae-young (women's 49 kg), Lee Ah-reum (women's 57 kg), and Lee Da-bin (women's +67 kg) qualified directly for their respective weight classes by finishing among the top five taekwondo practitioners at the end of the WT Olympic Rankings.

Athlete	Event	Qualification	Round of 16	Quarterfinals	Semifinals	Repechage 1	Repechage 2	Final / BM	
Athlete	Event	Opposition Result	Opposition Result	Opposition Result	Opposition Result	Opposition Result	Opposition Result	Opposition Result	Rank
Jang Jun	Men's −58 kg	—N/a	Barbosa (PHI); W 26–6	Vicente (ESP); W 24–19	Jendoubi (TUN); L 19–25	—N/a	Bye	Salim (HUN); W 46–16 PTG	3rd place, bronze medalist(s)
Lee Dae-hoon	Men's −68 kg	Bye	Rashitov (UZB); L 19–21	Did not advance		Fofana (MLI); W 11–9	Hosseini (IRI); W 30–21	Zhao S (CHN); L 15–17	=5
In Kyo-don	Men's +80 kg	—N/a	Mansouri (AFG); W 13–12	Zhaparov (KAZ); W 10–2	Georgievski (MKD); L 6–12	—N/a	Bye	Trajkovič (SLO); W 5–4	3rd place, bronze medalist(s)
Sim Jae-young	Women's −49 kg	Bye	El Bouchti (MAR); W 19–10	Yamada (JPN); L 7–16	Did not advance				
Lee Ah-reum	Women's −57 kg	Bye	Lo C-l (TPE); L 18–20	Did not advance					
Lee Da-bin	Women's +67 kg	—N/a	Traoré (CIV); W 17–13	Rodríguez (DOM); W 23–14	Walkden (GBR); W 25–24	—N/a	Bye	Mandić (SRB); L 6–10	2nd place, silver medalist(s)

== Tennis ==
South Korea entered one tennis player into the Olympic tournament, Kwon Soon-woo qualified for the men's singles.

Athlete	Event	Round of 64	Round of 32	Round of 16	Quarterfinals	Semifinals	Final / BM	
Athlete	Event	Opposition Score	Opposition Score	Opposition Score	Opposition Score	Opposition Score	Opposition Score	Rank
Kwon Soon-woo	Men's singles	Tiafoe (USA); L 3–6, 2–6	Did not advance					

== Volleyball ==
=== Indoor ===
Summary

Team	Event	Group stage						Quarterfinal	Semifinal	Final / BM	
Team	Event	Opposition Score	Opposition Score	Opposition Score	Opposition Score	Opposition Score	Rank	Opposition Score	Opposition Score	Opposition Score	Rank
South Korea women's	Women's tournament	Brazil; L 0–3	Kenya; W 3–0	Dominican Republic; W 3–2	Japan; W 3–2	Serbia; L 0–3	3 Q	Turkey; W 3–2	Brazil; L 0–3	Serbia; L 0–3	4

==== Women's tournament ====
The South Korean women's volleyball team qualified for the Olympics by winning the final match and securing an outright berth at the Asian Olympic Qualification Tournament in Nakhon Ratchasima, Thailand.

Team roster

The South Korea roster was announced on 4 July 2021.

Head coach: (Italy) Stefano Lavarini

- 1 Lee So-young OS
- 3 Yeum Hye-seon S
- 4 Kim Hee-jin OH
- 7 An Hye-jin S
- 8 Park Eun-jin MB
- 9 Oh Ji-young L
- 10 Kim Yeon-koung (c) OS
- 11 Kim Su-ji MB
- 13 Park Jeong-ah OS
- 14 Yang Hyo-jin MB
- 16 Jeong Ji-yun OP
- 19 Pyo Seung-ju OS

Group play

Pos	Team	Pld	W	L	Pts	SW	SL	SR	SPW	SPL	SPR	Qualification
1	Brazil	5	5	0	14	15	3	5.000	434	315	1.378	Quarter-finals
2	Serbia	5	4	1	12	13	3	4.333	381	313	1.217	Quarter-finals
3	South Korea	5	3	2	7	9	10	0.900	374	415	0.901	Quarter-finals
4	Dominican Republic	5	2	3	8	10	10	1.000	411	406	1.012	Quarter-finals
5	Japan (H)	5	1	4	4	6	12	0.500	378	395	0.957	
6	Kenya	5	0	5	0	0	15	0.000	242	376	0.644	

Source: Tokyo 2020 and FIVB
Rules for classification: Tiebreakers
(H) Host

25 July 2021; 21:45	Brazil	3–0	South Korea	Ariake Arena, Tokyo; Referees: Liu Jiang (CHN), Shin Muranaka (JPN)
25 July 2021; 21:45	(25–10, 25–22, 25–19); Results Statistics			Ariake Arena, Tokyo; Referees: Liu Jiang (CHN), Shin Muranaka (JPN)

27 July 2021; 21:45	South Korea	3–0	Kenya	Ariake Arena, Tokyo; Referees: Sumie Myoi (JPN), Evgeny Makshanov (RUS)
27 July 2021; 21:45	(25–14, 25–22, 26–24); Results Statistics			Ariake Arena, Tokyo; Referees: Sumie Myoi (JPN), Evgeny Makshanov (RUS)

29 July 2021; 11:05	South Korea	3–2	Dominican Republic	Ariake Arena, Tokyo; Referees: Hernán Casamiquela (ARG), Shin Muranaka (JPN)
29 July 2021; 11:05	(25–20, 17–25, 25–18, 15–25, 15–12); Results Statistics			Ariake Arena, Tokyo; Referees: Hernán Casamiquela (ARG), Shin Muranaka (JPN)

31 July 2021; 19:40	Japan	2–3	South Korea	Ariake Arena, Tokyo; Referees: Susana Rodríguez (ESP), Paulo Turci (BRA)
31 July 2021; 19:40	(19–25, 25–19, 22–25, 25–15, 14–16); Results Statistics			Ariake Arena, Tokyo; Referees: Susana Rodríguez (ESP), Paulo Turci (BRA)

2 August 2021; 09:00	Serbia	3–0	South Korea	Ariake Arena, Tokyo; Referees: Evgeny Makshanov (RUS), Sumie Myoi (JPN)
2 August 2021; 09:00	(25–18, 25–17, 25–15); Results Statistics			Ariake Arena, Tokyo; Referees: Evgeny Makshanov (RUS), Sumie Myoi (JPN)

Quarterfinal

4 August 2021; 09:00	South Korea	3–2	Turkey	Ariake Arena, Tokyo; Referees: Hamid Al-Rousi (UAE), Patricia Rolf (USA)
4 August 2021; 09:00	(17–25, 25–17, 28–26, 18–25, 15–13); Results Statistics			Ariake Arena, Tokyo; Referees: Hamid Al-Rousi (UAE), Patricia Rolf (USA)

Semifinal

6 August 2021; 21:00	Brazil	3–0	South Korea	Ariake Arena, Tokyo; Referees: Luis Macias (MEX), Denny Cespedes (DOM)
6 August 2021; 21:00	(25–16, 25–16, 25–16); Results Statistics			Ariake Arena, Tokyo; Referees: Luis Macias (MEX), Denny Cespedes (DOM)

Bronze medal game

8 August 2021; 09:00	South Korea	0–3	Serbia	Ariake Arena, Tokyo; Referees: Daniele Rapisarda (ITA), Patricia Rolf (USA)
8 August 2021; 09:00	(18–25, 15–25, 15–25); Results Statistics			Ariake Arena, Tokyo; Referees: Daniele Rapisarda (ITA), Patricia Rolf (USA)

== Weightlifting ==
South Korea entered eight weightlifters into the Olympic competition. Rio 2016 Olympians Won Jeong-sik (men's 73 kg) and Yu Dong-ju (men's 96 kg), Jin Yun-seong (men's 109 kg), Ham Eun-ji (women's 55 kg), Kim Su-hyeon (women's 76 kg), and Lee Seon-mi (women's +87 kg) secured one of the top eight slots each in their respective weight divisions based on the IWF Absolute World Rankings, with Han Myeong-mok and Kang Yeoun-hee topping the field of weightlifters from the Asian zone in the men's 67 kg and women's 87 kg category, respectively, based on the IWF Absolute Continental Rankings. Won Jeong-sik withdrew from competition prior to the start of his event due to an ankle injury.

Men

Athlete	Event	Snatch		Clean & Jerk		Total	Rank
Athlete	Event	Result	Rank	Result	Rank	Total	Rank
Han Myeong-mok	−67 kg	147	3	174	4	321	4
Yu Dong-ju	−96 kg	160	10	200	8	360	8
Jin Yun-seong	−109 kg	180	6	220	6	400	6

Women

Athlete	Event	Snatch		Clean & Jerk		Total	Rank
Athlete	Event	Result	Rank	Result	Rank	Total	Rank
Ham Eun-ji	−55 kg	85	9	116	4	201	7
Kim Su-hyeon	−76 kg	106	5	~~140~~	DNF	106	DNF
Kang Yeoun-hee	−87 kg	103	10	128	9	231	9
Lee Seon-mi	+87 kg	125	3	152	4	277	4

== Wrestling ==
South Korea qualified two wrestlers for each of the following weight classes into the Olympic competition; all of whom progressed to the top two finals of the men's Greco-Roman wrestling (67 and 130 kg), respectively, at the 2021 Asian Qualification Tournament in Almaty, Kazakhstan.

Key:

- VT (ranking points: 5–0 or 0–5) – Victory by fall.
- VB (ranking points: 5–0 or 0–5) – Victory by injury (VF for forfeit, VA for withdrawal or disqualification)
- PP (ranking points: 3–1 or 1–3) – Decision by points – the loser with technical points.
- PO (ranking points: 3–0 or 0–3) – Decision by points – the loser without technical points.
- ST (ranking points: 4–0 or 0–4) – Great superiority – the loser without technical points and a margin of victory of at least 8 (Greco-Roman) or 10 (freestyle) points.
- SP (ranking points: 4–1 or 1–4) – Technical superiority – the loser with technical points and a margin of victory of at least 8 (Greco-Roman) or 10 (freestyle) points.

Greco-Roman

Athlete	Event	Qualification	Round of 16	Quarterfinal	Semifinal	Repechage	Final / BM	
Athlete	Event	Opposition Result	Opposition Result	Opposition Result	Opposition Result	Opposition Result	Opposition Result	Rank
Ryu Han-su	Men's −67 kg	Merabet (ALG); W 4–0 ^{ST}	El-Sayed (EGY); L 1–3 ^{PP}	Did not advance				9
Kim Min-seok	Men's −130 kg	—N/a	Mirzazadeh (IRI); L 0–3 ^{PO}	Did not advance				14

== Politics ==
South Korean politicians took issue with a map of the torch relay on the Games' official website, which depicted the disputed Liancourt Rocks (territory claimed by Japan but governed by South Korea) as part of Japan. "South Korea, through the Japanese embassy in South Korea, has lodged a protest on the issue," Japan's then cabinet secretary Yoshihide Suga said, "Japan told the South Korean side that the protest is not acceptable given that Japan owns Takeshima and given Japan's position on the Sea of Japan."

The South Korean government also called for a ban of the Rising Sun Flag in the Olympic Games, due to being considered to be offensive as a consequence of its usage by the Imperial Japanese military during World War II. In September 2019, the South Korean parliamentary committee for sports asked the organisers of 2020 Summer Olympics in Tokyo to ban the Rising Sun Flag.

On 8 August 2021, the final day of the Tokyo 2020 Summer Olympics, the South Korean Olympic Committee announced, "The IOC has declared in a letter that the Rising Sun Flag violates the Olympic Charter. It will be banned at the Olympics." In response, the Tokyo Organising Committee of the Olympic Games announced on 9 August, "The announcement by the South Korean Olympic Committee is not true. When we contacted the IOC, we confirmed that the IOC will continue to respond to the issue on a case-by-case basis and will not impose a blanket ban. On the morning of 9 August, the IOC sent a letter to South Korea indicating that the use of the flag will be determined on a case-by-case basis."
