= Archery at the 2020 Summer Olympics – Women's team =

Women's team at the Games of the XXXII Olympiad
- Archery pictogram
- Venue: Yumenoshima Park
- Date: 23 July (ranking round); 25 July (match play)
- Competitors: 36 from 12 nations

Medalists
1st place, gold medalist(s)		An San; Jang Min-hee; Kang Chae-young	South Korea
2nd place, silver medalist(s)		Svetlana Gomboeva; Elena Osipova; Ksenia Perova	ROC
3rd place, bronze medalist(s)		Michelle Kroppen; Charline Schwarz; Lisa Unruh	Germany

The women's team archery event was one of five archery events held at the 2020 Summer Olympics. It was held at Yumenoshima Park, with the ranking round taking place on 23 July and match play on 25 July.

South Korea remained undefeated in the Women's team Archery by winning a 9th consecutive gold medal.

== Background ==
This was the 9th consecutive appearance of the event, which has been held every Games since 1988.

Of the 12 teams that competed in 2016, 8 qualified to return, including all four semifinalists (winner South Korea, silver medalist Russia (competing as "Russian Olympic Committee" athletes this Games), bronze medalist Chinese Taipei, and fourth-place finisher Italy). The other teams from 2016 that had qualified to return were Japan, Mexico, China, and Ukraine. Germany had qualified to return for the first time since 2004; Great Britain and the United States competed in 2012. Belarus competed in the event for the first time.

South Korea had won all 8 of the previous appearances of the event. Chinese Taipei was the reigning world champion, having defeated South Korea in the finals at the 2019 World Archery Championships.

== Qualification ==
12 teams qualify for the women's team archery event. The top 8 National Olympic Committees (NOCs) at the 2019 World Archery Championships qualified. One place was reserved for the host, Japan; the 2021 Archery Final Olympic Qualification Tournament would award either three or four places depending on whether Japan qualified through the World Championships. Because Japan did not, there were three places available at the Final OQT.

Teams that qualified for the team event also received 3 automatic qualification places for the team members in the individual event as well.

== Competition format ==
As with the other archery events, the women's team was a recurve archery event, held under the World Archery-approved 70-meter distance and rules. 12 teams of 3 archers each participate. Competition begins with a ranking round, in which each archer shoots 72 arrows (this is the same ranking round used for the individual event). The combined scores from the ranking round are used to seed the teams into a single-elimination bracket, with the top 4 teams receiving a bye into the second round (quarterfinals). Each match consists of four sets of 6 arrows, two per archer. The team with the highest score in the set – the total of the six arrows – receives two set points; if the teams are tied, each receives one set point. The first team to five set points wins the match. If the match is tied at 4–4 after 4 sets, a tie-breaker set is used with each archer on the team shooting one arrow; if the score of the tie-breaker set remains tied, the closest arrow to the center wins.

== Records ==
Prior to this competition, the existing world and Olympic records were as follows.

- 216 arrow ranking round

World record	South Korea; Chang Hye-jin, Kang Chae-young, Lee Eun-kyung	2053	Antalya, Turkey	21 May 2018
Olympic record	South Korea; Park Sung-hyun, Yun Ok-hee, Joo Hyun-jung	2004	Beijing, China	9 August 2008

== Schedule ==
All times are Japan Standard Time (UTC+9)

The schedule for the women's team event covers two separate days of competition.

Date	Time	Round
Friday, 23 July 2021	9:00	Ranking round
Sunday, 25 July 2021	9:30; 13:45; 15:17; 16:15; 16:40	1/8 finals Quarter-finals; Semi-finals; Bronze medal match Gold medal match

== Results ==
=== Ranking round ===
Rank	Nation	Archers	Score	10s	Xs
1	South Korea	An San; Jang Min-hee; Kang Chae-young	2032 (OR)	104	39
2	Mexico	Alejandra Valencia; Aída Román; Ana Paula Vázquez	1976	81	29
3	United States	Jennifer Mucino-Fernandez; Casey Kaufhold; Mackenzie Brown	1970	73	24
4	Japan	Miki Nakamura; Azusa Yamauchi; Ren Hayakawa	1957	74	25
5	China	Yang Xiaolei; Wu Jiaxin; Long Xiaoqing	1952	67	16
6	ROC	Svetlana Gomboeva; Elena Osipova; Ksenia Perova	1945	70	23
7	Chinese Taipei	Tan Ya-ting; Lei Chien-ying; Lin Chia-en	1937	71	23
8	Italy	Lucilla Boari; Chiara Rebagliati; Tatiana Andreoli	1936	60	16
9	Great Britain	Bryony Pitman; Sarah Bettles; Naomi Folkard	1916	65	22
10	Germany	Michelle Kroppen; Charline Schwarz; Lisa Unruh	1909	65	19
11	Ukraine	Lidiia Sichenikova; Veronika Marchenko; Anastasia Pavlova	1889	60	14
12	Belarus	Karyna Kazlouskaya; Hanna Marusava; Karyna Dziominskaya	1882	42	5

=== Competition bracket ===
1/8 elimination
9	Great Britain	3	52	52	45	53
8	Italy	5	51	53	46	53
5	China	3	50	54	53	52
12	Belarus	5	55	50	53	53
11	Ukraine	2	50	51	52	52
6	ROC	6	52	52	51	54
7	Chinese Taipei	2	54	54	49	50
10	Germany	6	55	47	52	55

Quarter-finals
1	South Korea	6	58	56	56
8	Italy	0	54	52	49
12	Belarus	5	48	52	55	54
4	Japan	3	52	51	55	48
3	United States	0	49	49	53
6	ROC	6	53	52	57
10	Germany	6	53	51	49	55
2	Mexico	2	48	48	54	49

Semi-finals
1	South Korea	5	54	57	53
12	Belarus	1	52	51	53
6	ROC	5	54	51	57
10	Germany	1	54	48	52

Gold medal match
1	South Korea	6	55	56	54
6	ROC	0	54	53	51
Bronze medal match
12	Belarus	1	48	51	55
10	Germany	5	55	53	55

- The figure in italics signifies the set scores.
