= Archery at the 2020 Summer Olympics – Women's individual =

Women's individual at the Games of the XXXII Olympiad
- Olympic archery
- Venue: Yumenoshima Park
- Date: 23 July 2021 (ranking round); 27–29 July 2021 (match play); 31 July 2021 (finals)
- Competitors: 64 from 40 nations

Medalists
1st place, gold medalist(s)		An San	South Korea
2nd place, silver medalist(s)		Elena Osipova	ROC
3rd place, bronze medalist(s)		Lucilla Boari	Italy

The women's individual archery event was one of five archery events held at the 2020 Summer Olympics. It was held at Yumenoshima Park. There were 64 competitors from 40 nations, with each nation having either 1 or 3 archers.

== Background ==
This was the 13th consecutive Olympic appearance of the event, which has been held every Games since archery returned to the Olympic program in 1972.

Five of the 8 quarterfinalists from the 2016 Games returned: silver medalist Lisa Unruh of Germany, fourth-place finisher Alejandra Valencia of Mexico, and quarterfinalists Tan Ya-ting of Chinese Taipei, Wu Jiaxin of China, and Naomi Folkard of Great Britain. Ranking round world record holder Kang Chae-young of South Korea competed. The 2019 World Champion Lei Chien-ying joined Tan on the Chinese Taipei team (Kang was the bronze medalist).

== Qualification ==
64 archers qualify for the women's archery events. The 12 National Olympic Committees (NOCs) that qualify for the women's team event (including the host, Japan) enter the 3 team members in the individual event as well. Otherwise, NOCs may qualify a maximum of 1 archer in women's individual. There are quota spots available at various tournaments, including the World Championships, multiple continental events, and a final qualification tournament. There are also two Tripartite Commission invitational spots.

== Competition format ==
As with the other archery events, the women's individual is a recurve archery event, held under the World Archery-approved 70-meter distance and rules. Competition begins with a ranking round, in which each archer shoots 72 arrows. The scores from the ranking round are used to seed the archers into a single-elimination bracket. The knockout matches use the set system introduced in 2012. Each match consists of up to 5 sets of 3 arrows per archer. The archer with the best score in each set wins the set, earning 2 points. If the score is tied, each archer receives 1 point. The first archer to score 6 points wins the match. If the match is tied 5-5 after 5 sets, a single tie-breaker arrow is to be used with the closest to center winning.

== Records ==
Prior to the competition, the world and Olympic records were as follows.

- 72 arrow ranking round

World record	Kang Chae-young (KOR)	692	's-Hertogenbosch, Netherlands	10 June 2019
Olympic record	Lina Herasymenko (UKR)	673	Atlanta, United States	28 July 1996

The following record was established during the competition:

Date	Event	Name	Nation	Score	Record
23 July	Ranking round	An San	South Korea	680	OR

== Schedule ==
The schedule for the women's individual event covers five separate days of competition.

All times are Japan Standard Time (UTC+9)

Date	Time	Round
Friday, 23 July 2021	9:00	Ranking round
Tuesday, 27 July 2021; Wednesday, 28 July 2021; Thursday, 29 July 2021	9:30; 16:00	1/32 finals 1/16 finals
Friday, 30 July 2021	9:30; 14:45; 15:45; 16:30; 16:44	1/8 finals Quarter-finals; Semi-finals; Bronze medal match Gold medal match

== Results ==
=== Ranking round ===
The ranking round was held on 23 July 2021.

Rank	Archer	Nation	10s	Xs	Score
1	An San	South Korea	36	16	680 (OR)
2	Jang Min-hee	South Korea	32	11	677
3	Kang Chae-young	South Korea	36	12	675
4	Alejandra Valencia	Mexico	35	10	674
5	Mackenzie Brown	United States	28	10	668
6	Aída Román	Mexico	31	10	665
7	Azusa Yamauchi	Japan	30	7	665
8	Ksenia Perova	ROC	29	8	664
9	Deepika Kumari	India	30	13	663
10	Chiara Rebagliati	Italy	24	5	658
11	Michelle Kroppen	Germany	26	6	655
12	Denisa Baránková	Slovakia	25	6	655
13	Lisa Barbelin	France	32	9	654
14	Yang Xiaolei	China	22	5	654
15	Sarah Bettles	Great Britain	27	11	653
16	Ren Hayakawa	Japan	27	11	653
17	Casey Kaufhold	United States	21	8	653
18	Wu Jiaxin	China	25	9	652
19	Yasemin Anagöz	Turkey	25	9	652
20	Gabriela Schloesser	Netherlands	23	6	652
21	Lin Chia-en	Chinese Taipei	28	5	651
22	Elena Osipova	ROC	27	11	651
23	Lucilla Boari	Italy	26	9	651
24	Jennifer Mucino-Fernandez	United States	24	6	649
25	Maja Jager	Denmark	20	5	649
26	Lisa Unruh	Germany	26	11	647
27	Tan Ya-ting	Chinese Taipei	22	8	646
28	Long Xiaoqing	China	20	2	646
29	Karyna Dziominskaya	Belarus	18	3	642
30	Lei Chien-ying	Chinese Taipei	21	10	640
31	Miki Nakamura	Japan	17	7	639
32	Ana Paula Vázquez	Mexico	15	9	637
33	Ane Marcelle dos Santos	Brazil	18	5	636
34	Marie Horáčková	Czech Republic	18	2	636
35	Veronika Marchenko	Ukraine	30	10	635
36	Diya Siddique	Bangladesh	19	6	635
37	Mădălina Amaistroaie	Romania	23	6	634
38	Bryony Pitman	Great Britain	21	4	634
39	Hanna Marusava	Belarus	14	2	633
40	Diananda Choirunisa	Indonesia	23	7	631
41	Anastasia Pavlova	Ukraine	16	3	631
42	Sylwia Zyzańska	Poland	24	10	630
43	Syaqiera Mashayikh	Malaysia	18	3	630
44	Evangelia Psarra	Greece	16	3	630
45	Svetlana Gomboeva	ROC	14	4	630
46	Stephanie Barrett	Canada	11	3	630
47	Naomi Folkard	Great Britain	17	7	629
48	Inés de Velasco	Spain	18	5	628
49	Đỗ Thị Ánh Nguyệt	Vietnam	18	3	628
50	Valentina Acosta	Colombia	16	4	627
51	Alexandra Mîrca	Moldova	15	5	627
52	Tatiana Andreoli	Italy	10	2	627
53	Reena Pärnat	Estonia	17	2	626
54	Lidiia Sichenikova	Ukraine	14	1	623
55	Christine Bjerendal	Sweden	21	6	622
56	Karma	Bhutan	19	7	616
57	Alice Ingley	Australia	13	3	616
58	Bishindeegiin Urantungalag	Mongolia	14	2	614
59	Rihab Elwalid	Tunisia	12	4	609
60	Charline Schwarz	Germany	13	2	607
61	Karyna Kazlouskaya	Belarus	10	0	607
62	Adriana Espinosa de los Monteros	Ecuador	7	2	606
63	Amal Adam	Egypt	7	4	570
64	Marlyse Hourtou	Chad	7	5	553

=== Competition bracket ===
==== Section 1 ====
Round of 64
1	An S (KOR)	6	27	27	28	28
64	M Hourtou (CHA)	2	28	23	26	22
33	A M dos Santos (BRA)	6	18	28	28	28	27
32	A Vázquez (MEX)	4	28	27	25	29	17
17	C Kaufhold (USA)	7	27	24	23	25	27
48	I de Velasco (ESP)	3	20	24	24	24	25
49	Đỗ T A N (VIE)	5^{7}	28	25	26	26	25
16	R Hayakawa (JPN)	6^{8}	23	28	24	26	26
9	D Kumari (IND)	6	26	26	27
56	Karma (BHU)	0	23	23	24
41	A Pavlova (UKR)	4	26	25	29	26	23
24	J Mucino-Fernandez (USA)	6	27	26	23	21	26
25	M Jager (DEN)	6	23	24	26	26
40	D Choirunisa (INA)	2	22	26	22	25
57	A Ingley (AUS)	1	23	22	23	23
8	K Perova (ROC)	7	30	27	23	26

Round of 32
1	An S (KOR)	7	27	28	30	28
33	A M dos Santos (BRA)	1	27	24	27	25
17	C Kaufhold (USA)	2	26	25	29	25
16	R Hayakawa (JPN)	6	29	28	28	27
9	D Kumari (IND)	6	25	28	27	24	26
24	J Mucino-Fernandez (USA)	4	26	25	25	25	25
25	M Jager (DEN)	3	25	26	30	25	26
8	K Perova (ROC)	7	26	26	24	26	27

Round of 16
1	An S (KOR)	6	27	30	29	28	30
16	R Hayakawa (JPN)	4	28	27	27	29	27
9	D Kumari (IND)	6^{10}	28	26	28	26	25
8	K Perova (ROC)	5^{7}	25	27	27	26	28

Quarter-finals
1	An S (KOR)	6	30	26	26
9	D Kumari (IND)	0	27	24	24

==== Section 2 ====
Round of 64
5	M Brown (USA)	6	24	27	29	27
60	C Schwarz (GER)	2	27	21	24	22
37	M Amaistroaie (ROU)	2	25	21	25	22
28	Long XQ (CHN)	6	25	24	26	22
21	Lin C-e (TPE)	6	24	22	25	24	29
44	E Psarra (GRE)	4	25	25	24	22	28
53	R Pärnat (EST)	6	21	21	23	21	24
12	D Baránková (SVK)	4	26	15	22	27	22
13	L Barbelin (FRA)	6	26	28	27	30
52	T Andreoli (ITA)	2	28	24	25	25
45	S Gomboeva (ROC)	5^{8}	26	27	27	27	26
20	G Schloesser (NED)	6^{9}	27	26	27	27	26
29	K Dziominskaya (BLR)	6^{10}	22	26	25	27	25
36	D Siddique (BAN)	5^{9}	23	25	25	25	27
61	K Kazlouskaya (BLR)	0	23	25	25
4	A Valencia (MEX)	6	24	27	29

Round of 32
5	M Brown (USA)	6	27	27	29
28	Long XQ (CHN)	0	22	26	28
21	Lin C-e (TPE)	7	24	26	28	26	30
53	R Pärnat (EST)	3	26	26	26	25	25
13	L Barbelin (FRA)	6	24	28	29
20	G Schloesser (NED)	0	21	26	24
29	K Dziominskaya (BLR)	3	27	27	25	24	27
4	A Valencia (MEX)	7	27	23	27	27	28

Round of 16
5	M Brown (USA)	6	28	28	27	28
21	Lin C-e (TPE)	2	23	28	27	26
13	L Barbelin (FRA)	0	25	26	26
4	A Valencia (MEX)	6	29	28	27

Quarter-finals
5	M Brown (USA)	6^{X}	27	27	27	27	28
4	A Valencia (MEX)	5^{10}	27	27	30	27	27

==== Section 3 ====
Round of 64
3	Kang C-y (KOR)	6	29	27	28
62	A E de los Monteros (ECU)	0	22	20	24
35	V Marchenko (UKR)	6	26	29	27	26	30
30	Lei C-y (TPE)	4	29	25	29	24	27
19	Y Anagöz (TUR)	6	24	23	29	28
46	S Barrett (CAN)	2	26	18	27	26
51	A Mîrca (MDA)	0	27	25	23
14	Yang XL (CHN)	6	29	30	27
11	M Kroppen (GER)	6	27	29	27
54	L Sichenikova (UKR)	0	21	25	23
43	S Mashayikh (MAS)	4	26	26	26	25	23
22	E Osipova (ROC)	6	25	28	26	25	29
27	Tan Y-t (TPE)	4	27	26	25	27	27
38	B Pitman (GBR)	6	26	25	27	28	28
59	R Elwalid (TUN)	2	29	22	26	22
6	A Román (MEX)	6	27	23	28	23

Round of 32
3	Kang C-y (KOR)	7	27	29	29	28
35	V Marchenko (UKR)	1	26	28	29	24
19	Y Anagöz (TUR)	6	26	27	28	30
14	Yang XL (CHN)	2	28	26	25	27
11	M Kroppen (GER)	4	27	23	26	26	26
22	E Osipova (ROC)	6	25	27	24	27	28
38	B Pitman (GBR)	6	28	23	25	27
6	A Román (MEX)	2	27	25	24	21

Round of 16
3	Kang C-y (KOR)	6	28	30	25	29
19	Y Anagöz (TUR)	2	27	27	27	27
22	E Osipova (ROC)	6	28	30	29
38	B Pitman (GBR)	0	25	22	26

Quarter-finals
3	Kang C-y (KOR)	1	28	25	26	27
22	E Osipova (ROC)	7	28	29	27	29

==== Section 4 ====
Round of 64
7	A Yamauchi (JPN)	6	23	24	26	27
58	U Bishindeegiin (MGL)	2	25	23	24	25
39	H Marusava (BLR)	6	26	24	25	24	25
26	L Unruh (GER)	4	18	24	20	25	25
23	L Boari (ITA)	6	27	26	27
42	S Zyzańska (POL)	0	26	21	25
55	C Bjerendal (SWE)	2	26	22	25	22
10	C Rebagliati (ITA)	6	24	26	28	27
15	S Bettles (GBR)	6	30	27	26	26	27
50	V Acosta (COL)	4	23	28	22	27	25
47	N Folkard (GBR)	2	20	26	28	26
18	Wu JX (CHN)	6	22	28	27	28
31	M Nakamura (JPN)	6	26	26	27	28
34	M Horáčková (CZE)	2	26	26	25	24
63	A Adam (EGY)	0	26	21	24
2	Jang M-h (KOR)	6	27	30	27

Round of 32
7	A Yamauchi (JPN)	0	24	22	26
39	H Marusava (BLR)	6	26	23	27
23	L Boari (ITA)	6	25	25	25	28	27
10	C Rebagliati (ITA)	4	26	26	24	26	25
15	S Bettles (GBR)	2	27	29	27	25
18	Wu JX (CHN)	6	29	27	30	27
31	M Nakamura (JPN)	6	28	26	26	27
2	Jang M-h (KOR)	2	26	25	27	26

Round of 16
39	H Marusava (BLR)	5^{9}	27	23	27	28	28
23	L Boari (ITA)	6^{10}	26	27	26	28	29
18	Wu JX (CHN)	7	28	28	28	28
31	M Nakamura (JPN)	1	25	28	27	25

Quarter-finals
23	L Boari (ITA)	6	29	28	27	29
18	Wu JX (CHN)	2	27	25	28	27

== Finals ==
Semi-finals
1	An San (KOR)	6^{10}	28	30	30	27	28
5	Mackenzie Brown (USA)	5^{9}	29	28	28	30	28
22	Elena Osipova (ROC)	6	27	29	27
23	Lucilla Boari (ITA)	0	25	26	26

Gold medal match
1	An San (KOR)	6^{10}	28	30	27	27	29
22	Elena Osipova (ROC)	5^{8}	28	29	28	29	27
Bronze medal match
5	Mackenzie Brown (USA)	1	28	28	25	26
23	Lucilla Boari (ITA)	7	28	29	28	27
