= Kim Min-woo =

- Hangul: 김민우
- RR: Gim Minu
- MR: Kim Minu

Kim Min-woo may refer to:

- Kim Min-woo (infielder) (born 1979), South Korean baseball player
- Kim Min-woo (figure skater) (born 1986), South Korean ice dancer
- Kim Min-woo (footballer) (born 1990), South Korean football player
- Kim Min-woo (pitcher) (born 1995), South Korean baseball player
- Kim Min-woo (curler) (born 1996), South Korean curler
- Cha Woo-min (born 2000, Kim Min-woo), South Korean actor
