= Yumenoshima =

Yumenoshima 夢の島
- District
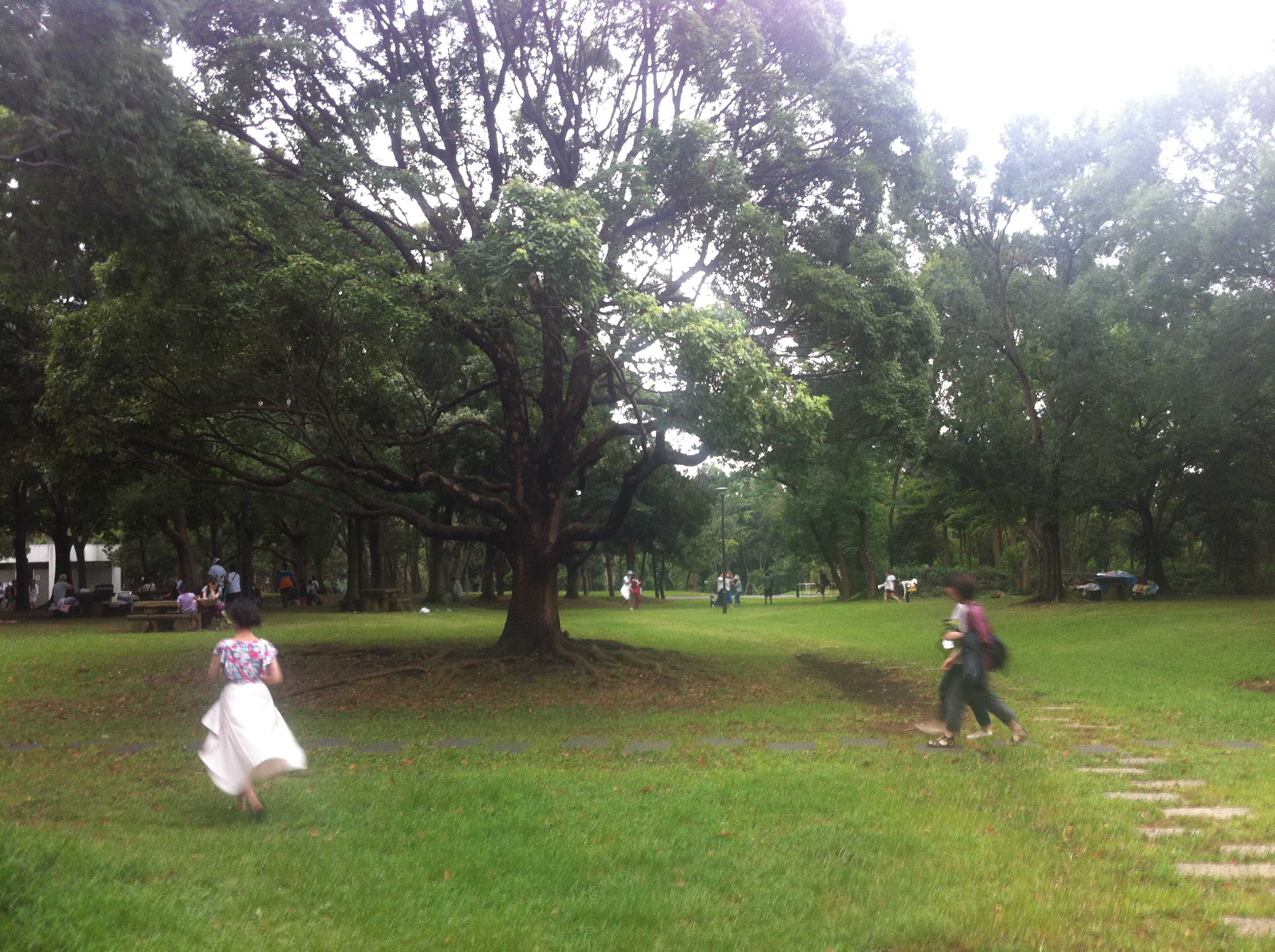
- Inside Yumenoshima Park

- Location in Tokyo
- Coordinates: 35°39′00″N 139°49′55″E
- Country: Japan
- Prefecture: Tokyo

Area
  - Total: 1.53 km^{2} (0.59 sq mi)
- Postal Code: 136-0081

Yumenoshima (夢の島; lit. Dream Island or Island of Dreams) is a district in Kōtō, Tokyo, Japan, consisting of an artificial island built using waste landfill in Tokyo Bay. It is not the first such island in the bay (see Umi-no-mori ja:海の森公園). At current fill rates, there will be no more room for waste landfill in the bay without affecting shipping lanes by around 2050; likewise, Osaka Bay and Ise Bay are slowly being consumed by waste landfill islands, e.g. Rinku Town.

== History ==
The island was originally conceived in the 1930s as a site for a new Tokyo Municipal Airport to replace Haneda Airport. The airport plan was finalized in 1938, and work on the island began in 1939 but fell behind schedule due to resource constraints during World War II. The airport plan was officially abandoned following the war, as the Allied occupation authorities favoured expanding Haneda rather than building a new airport.

A public beach opened on the island in 1947 when the "Yumenoshima" name was adopted. The beach closed in 1950, and from 1957, the island was used for garbage disposal (mainly plastic at the time).

== Places ==
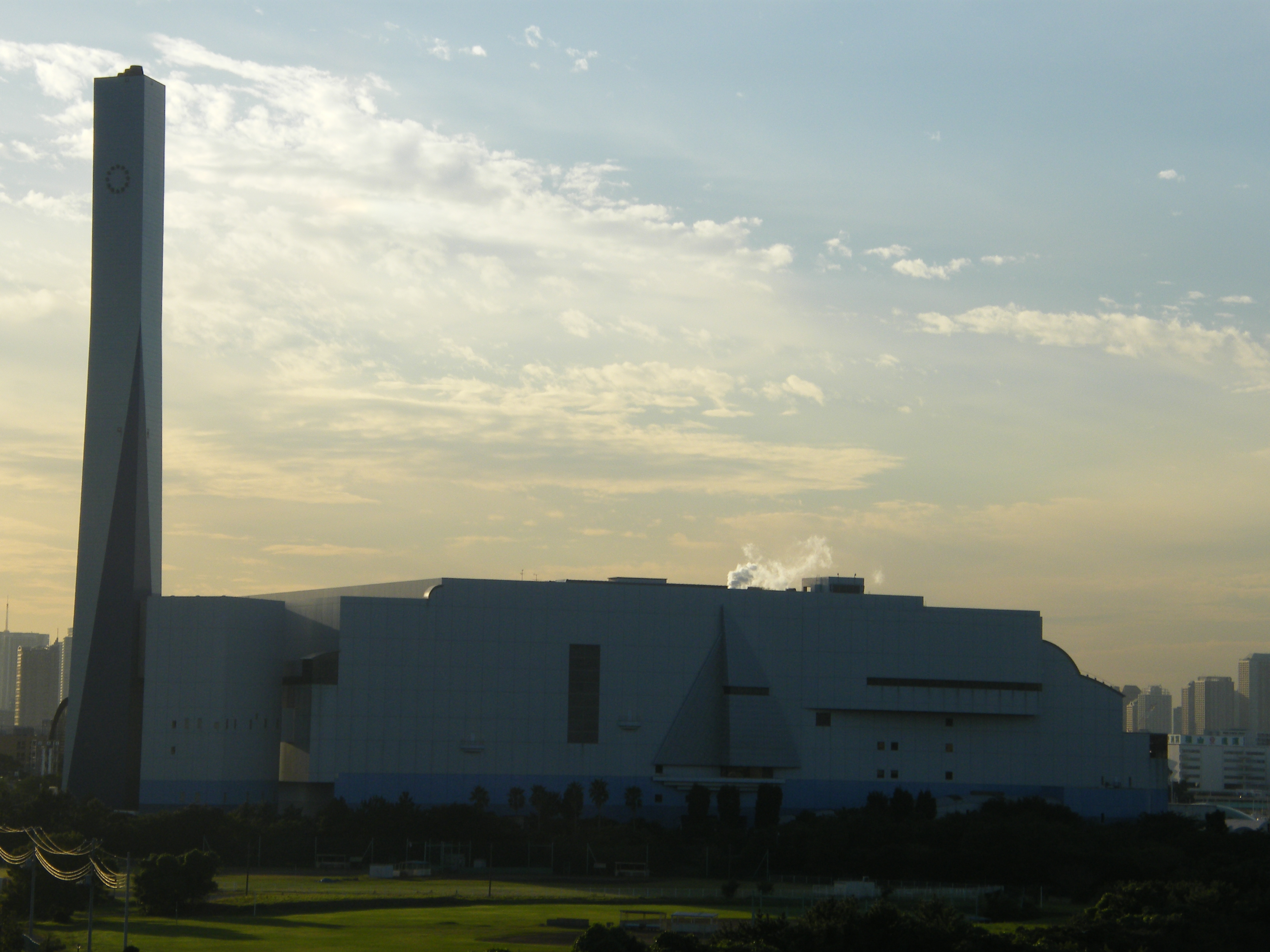
Shin-Koto Incineration Plant

Yumenoshima is a fairly small district, and contains:

- Yumenoshima Park, a public park with an array of facilities, including a tropical botanical garden, a sports complex, a barbecue area, a colosseum, a yacht marina, a track and field stadium and a ramen stand
- Yumenoshima Stadium, a football and athletics stadium used for youth competitions and lower league football matches
- Yumenoshima Baseball Field, a baseball field for local youth teams
- Koto Incineration Facility, an incineration facility for Koto Ward

Today, Yumenoshima also houses the Daigo Fukuryū Maru, a wooden fishing boat exposed to nuclear fallout during the Bikini Atoll test in 1954; the boat was modified as a training vessel following the exposure and later abandoned near Yumenoshima.

== 2020 Summer Olympics ==
Yumenoshima Park was the venue for archery events in the 2020 Summer Olympics and the 2020 Summer Paralympics.

== Schools ==
The Koto Ward Board of Education operates public elementary and junior high schools.

Minamisuna Elementary School (南砂小学校) is the zoned public elementary school for Yumenoshima.

Minamisuna Junior High School (南砂中学校) is the zoned public junior high school for Yumenoshima.
