= Svetlana Gomboeva =

Russian archer (born 1998)

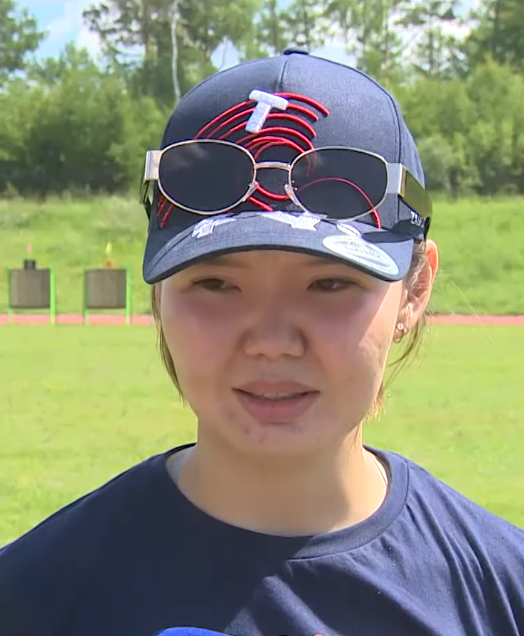
- Gomboeva in 2021

Personal information
- Full name: Svetlana Vadimovna Gomboeva
- Nationality: Russian
- Born: 8 June 1998 (age 28)

Sport
- Country: Russia
- Sport: Archery
- Event: recurve
Medal record
Women's archery
Representing (Russia) ROC
Olympic Games
Silver medal – second place	2020 Tokyo	Team
Representing Russia
European Championships
Gold medal – first place	2021 Antalya	Team
Summer Universiade
Silver medal – second place	2019 Naples	Team

Svetlana Vadimovna Gomboeva (Russian: Светлана Вадимовна Гомбоева, IPA: [svʲɪˈtɫanə ɡɐmˈbo(ɪ̯)ɪvə]; born 8 June 1998) is a Russian archer. She competed in the women's individual event at the 2020 Summer Olympics held in Tokyo, Japan. She finished 45th in the ranking round before collapsing from sunstroke amid a record heatwave in Tokyo. She was also part of the women's team winning the silver medal.

In 2019, she won the silver medal in the women's team recurve event at the 2019 Summer Universiade held in Naples, Italy. She won the gold medal in the women's team recurve event at the 2021 European Archery Championships held in Antalya, Turkey.
