= Lee Eui-lee =

South Korean baseball player (born 2002)

Kia Tigers – No. 48
- Pitcher
- Born: June 16, 2002 (age 24); Gwangju, South Korea
- Bats: Left Throws: Left

KBO debut
- April 8, 2021, for the Kia Tigers

KBO statistics (through 2025)
- Win–loss record: 27–26
- Earned run average: 4.26
- Strikeouts: 466
- Stats at Baseball Reference

Teams
- Kia Tigers (2021–present)

Career highlights and awards
- KBO Rookie of the Year (2021)

- Lee Eui-lee
- Hangul: 이의리
- RR: I Uiri
- MR: I Ŭiri

Lee Eui-lee (Korean: 이의리; born June 16, 2002) is a South Korean professional baseball pitcher currently playing for the Kia Tigers of the KBO League. He competed in the 2020 Summer Olympics.

Lee is a left-handed pitcher for the KIA Tigers. He joined the team with the first nomination in 2021. He won the Rookie of the Year award in the 2021 season and became the first high school graduate to win the Rookie of the Year award for the Tigers in 36 years since Lee Soon-chul in the 1985 season.

He records a lot of strikeouts by using breaking balls such as four-seam fastballs, sliders, knuckle curves, and circle changeups. The maximum speed of a four-seam fastball is 153.4 km/h, and the average speed is mid to late 140 km/h. According to an interview on March 26, 2021, the circle change-up said it had some sense of control, and the slider and curve were being adjusted. In the case of the four-seam, he has the ability to throw a ball that spans the left and right strike zones or deviates from about one ball from time to time. The average speed is not much different from the maximum speed.
