= Azusa Yamauchi =

Japanese archer (born 1998)

Personal information
- Nationality: Japanese
- Born: 11 September 1998 (age 26)

Sport
- Sport: Archery

Azusa Yamauchi (山内梓, Yamauchi Azusa, born 11 September 1998) is a Japanese archer. In 2019, she competed in the women's recurve event at the 2019 Summer Universiade held in Naples, Italy. She also competed in the women's individual event at the 2020 Summer Olympics.
