= Long Xiaoqing =

Chinese archer (born 1997)

Personal information
- Nationality: Chinese
- Born: 27 February 1997 (age 29)

Sport
- Sport: Archery
Medal record
Women's recurve archery
Representing China
Asian Championships
Silver medal – second place	2019 Bangkok	Team

Long Xiaoqing (born 27 February 1997) is a Chinese archer. She won the silver medal in the women's team event at the 2019 Asian Archery Championships held in Bangkok, Thailand. She competed in the women's individual event at the 2020 Summer Olympics held in Tokyo, Japan.
