= Song Jae-ho (fencer) =

South Korean fencer

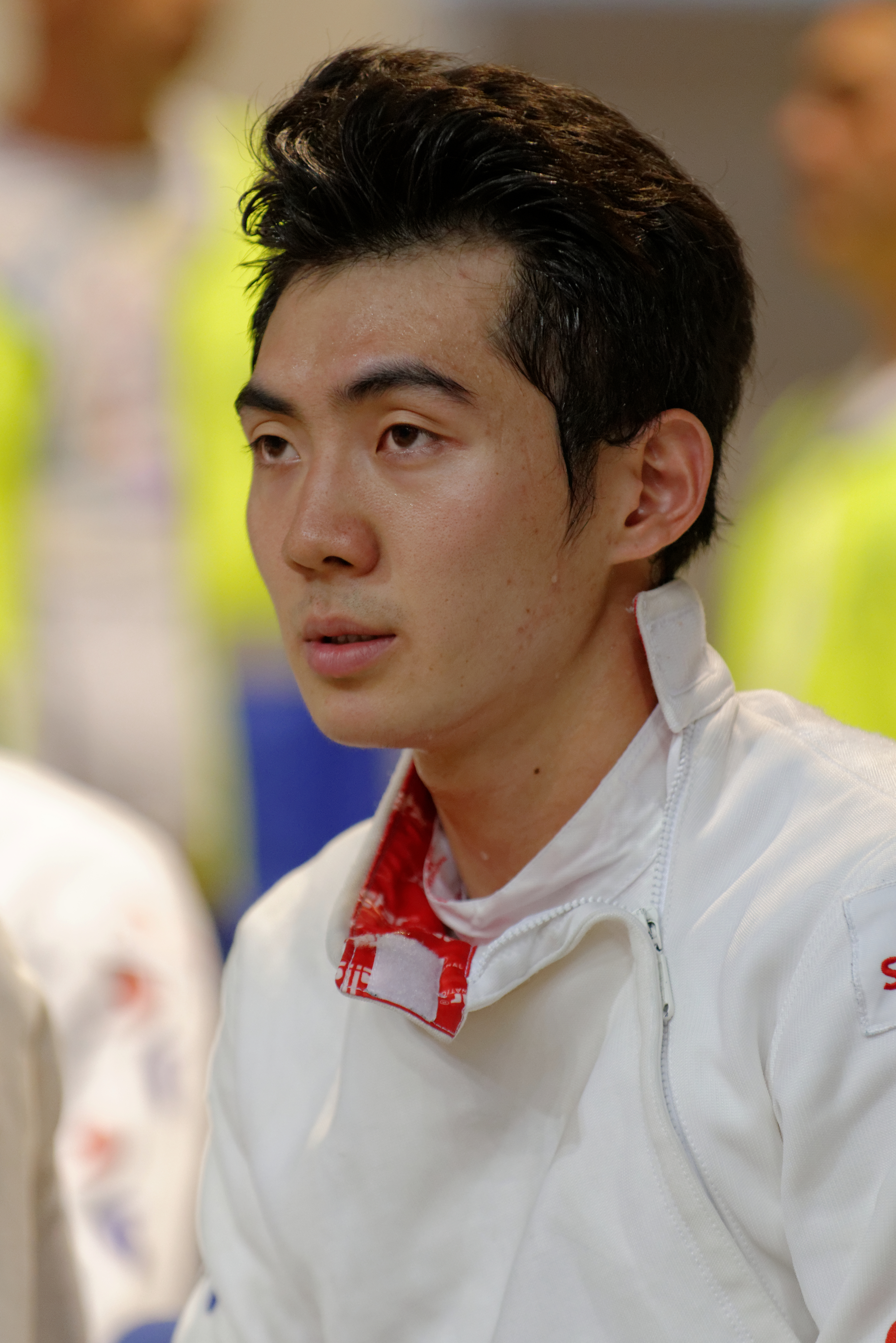
- Song at the 2013 World Fencing Championships

Personal information
- Born: February 19, 1990 (age 36)

Fencing career
- Sport: Fencing
- Country: South Korea
- Weapon: Épée
- Hand: Right-handed
- FIE ranking: current ranking
Medal record
Representing South Korea
Olympic Games
Bronze medal – third place	2020 Tokyo	Team épée
Asian Championships
Bronze medal – third place	2013 Shanghai	Team
East Asian Games
Gold medal – first place	2013 Tianjin	Team

Song Jae-ho (Korean: 송재호; born February 19, 1990) is a South Korean right-handed épée fencer and 2021 team Olympic bronze medalist.

== Medal record ==
=== Olympic Games ===
Year	Location	Event	Position
2021	Tokyo, Japan	Team Men's Épée	3rd

=== Asian Championship ===
Year	Location	Event	Position
2013	Shanghai, China	Team Men's Épée	3rd

=== World Cup ===
Date	Location	Event	Position
03/15/2013	Tallinn, Estonia	Individual Men's Épée	2nd
