= Jang Min-hee =

South Korean archer (born 1999)

Personal information
- Native name: 장민희
- National team: South Korea
- Born: 5 April 1999 (age 27)

Sport
- Country: South Korea
- Sport: Archery
- Rank: 16 (as of 27 September 2021)
- Event: Recurve
- University team: Incheon National University
Medal record
Women's recurve archery
Representing South Korea
Olympic Games
Gold medal – first place	2020 Tokyo	Team
World Championships
Gold medal – first place	2021 Yankton	Individual
Gold medal – first place	2021 Yankton	Team
Asian Championships
Gold medal – first place	2025 Dhaka	Team
Bronze medal – third place	2025 Dhaka	Mixed team

Jang Min-hee (Korean: 장민희, born 5 April 1999) is a South Korean archer. She won gold in the women's individual and team events at the 2021 World Archery Championships held in Yankton, United States. She also won the gold medal in the women's team event at the 2020 Summer Olympics held in Tokyo, Japan.

She graduated from Incheon National University.

== Career ==
She competed at the 2019 World Archery Youth Championships in Madrid, Spain. She won two gold medals from women's team and mixed team event, bronze medal in individual competition. She made her Olympic debut at 2020 Summer Olympics. With her teammates Kang Chae-young and An San, they won gold medal in women's team event. Two months later, she also won the gold medal in the women's individual and women's team events at the 2021 World Archery Championships held in Yankton, United States.
