= Yumenoshima Park =

Park in Tokyo, Japan

Coordinates: 35.6493854°N 139.8258119°E

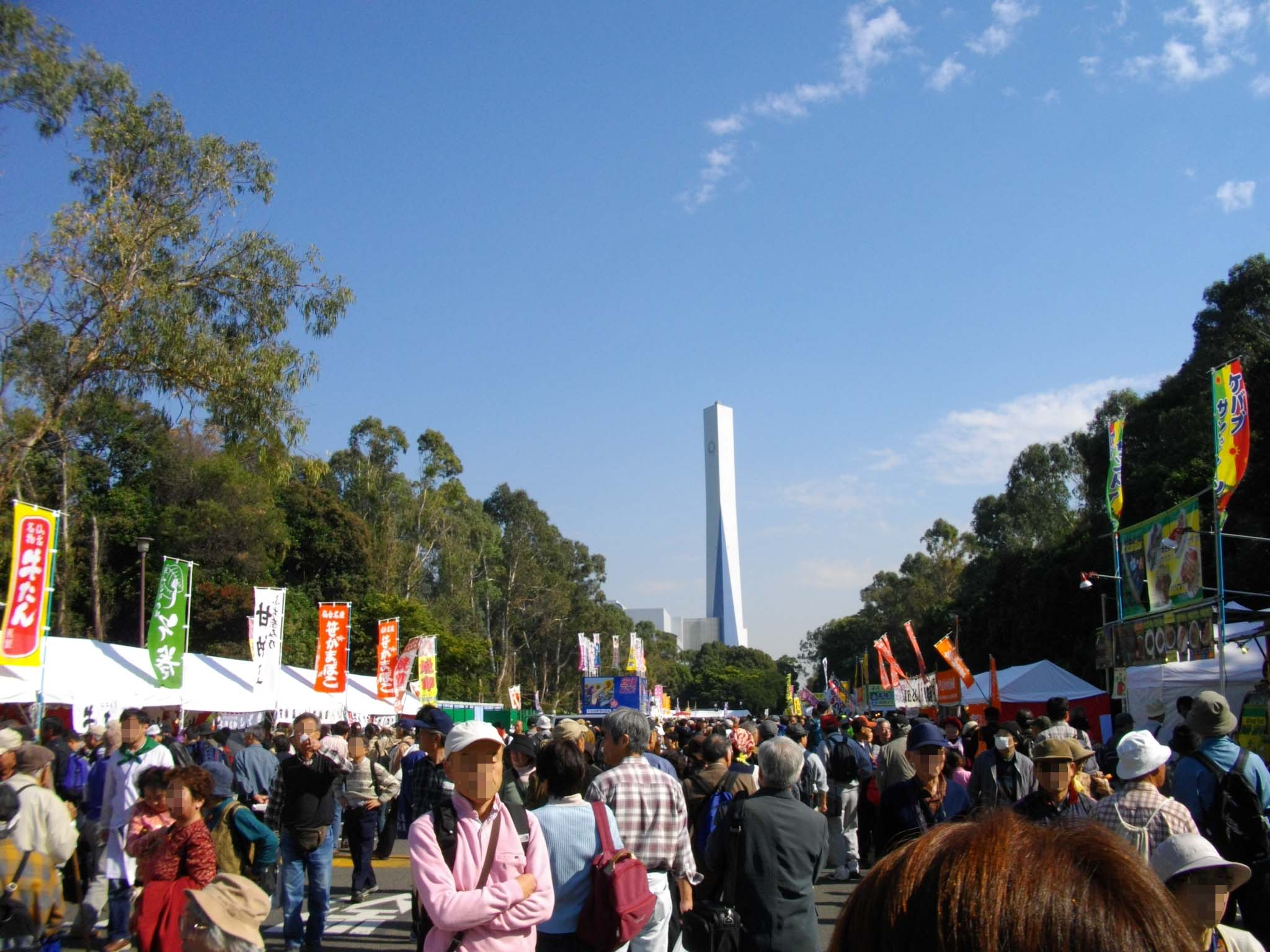
- Akahata Festival in the park in 2010
- Interactive map of Yumenoshima Park
- Location: Kōtō Ward, Tokyo, Japan
- Area: 433,212 square metres (107.049 acres)
- Created: 1 October 1978
- Public transit: Shin-Kiba Station

Yumenoshima Park (夢の島公園, Yumenoshima Kōen) is a sports park in Yumenoshima, Kōtō Ward, Tokyo, Japan. It was made by improving a landfill site called Yumenoshima, which was the final disposal site for garbage from 1957 until 1967. Yumenoshima was the site of the archery event of the Tokyo Olympic Games in 2020.

== Facilities ==
- Yumenoshima Stadium (contains sports facilities such as a track and field area)
- Barbecue area
- Tokyo Sports Culture Center (nicknamed BumB)
- Yumenoshima Tropical Greenhouse Dome, a botanical garden
- Tokyo Metropolitan Daigo Fukuryū Maru Exhibition Hall

== Admission fee ==
Admission to the park is free of charge, but the Tropical Greenhouse Dome and sports facilities require an entrance fee.

== Opening times and holidays ==
The park is open all year round. However, the barbecue area is closed on New Year's holidays, while the Tropical Greenhouse Dome and Daigo Fukuryū Maru Exhibition Hall are closed on New Year's holidays and Mondays.

== Festival ==
The Akahata Matsuri (赤旗まつり) (lit. 'Red Flag Festival') is sometimes held in the park. Organised by the Japanese Communist Party, it takes place once every four years or so and lasts about 2 or 3 days. The most recent one was in November 2014.

== 2020 Olympics ==
Yumenoshima Park was the venue for archery events in the 2020 Tokyo Olympics. It also hosted archery for the 2020 Paralympics. The qualification field was completed in February 2019. A test event for the Olympic and Paralympic Games archery events was held in July 2019.

== Gallery ==
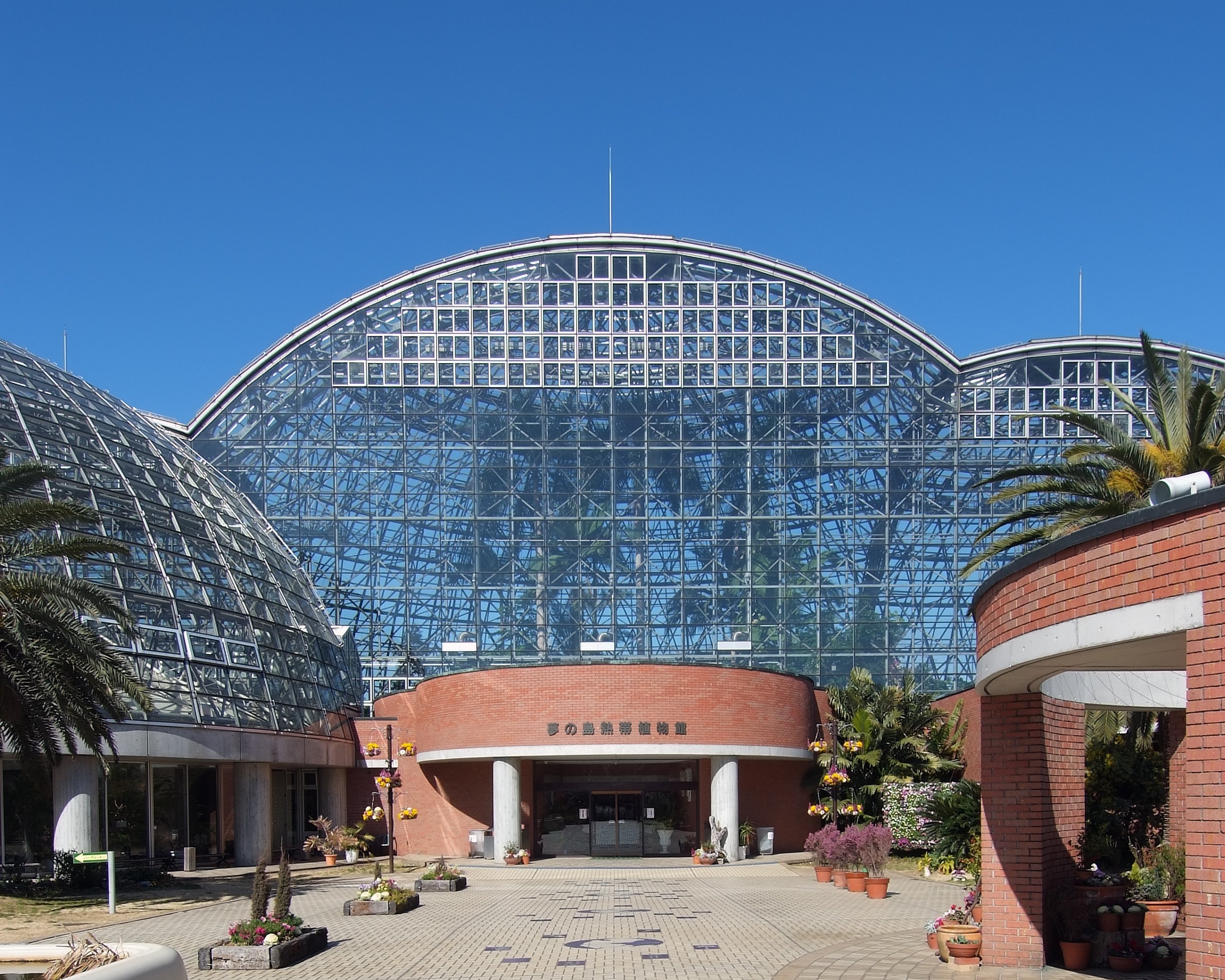
Yumenoshima Tropical Greenhouse Dome

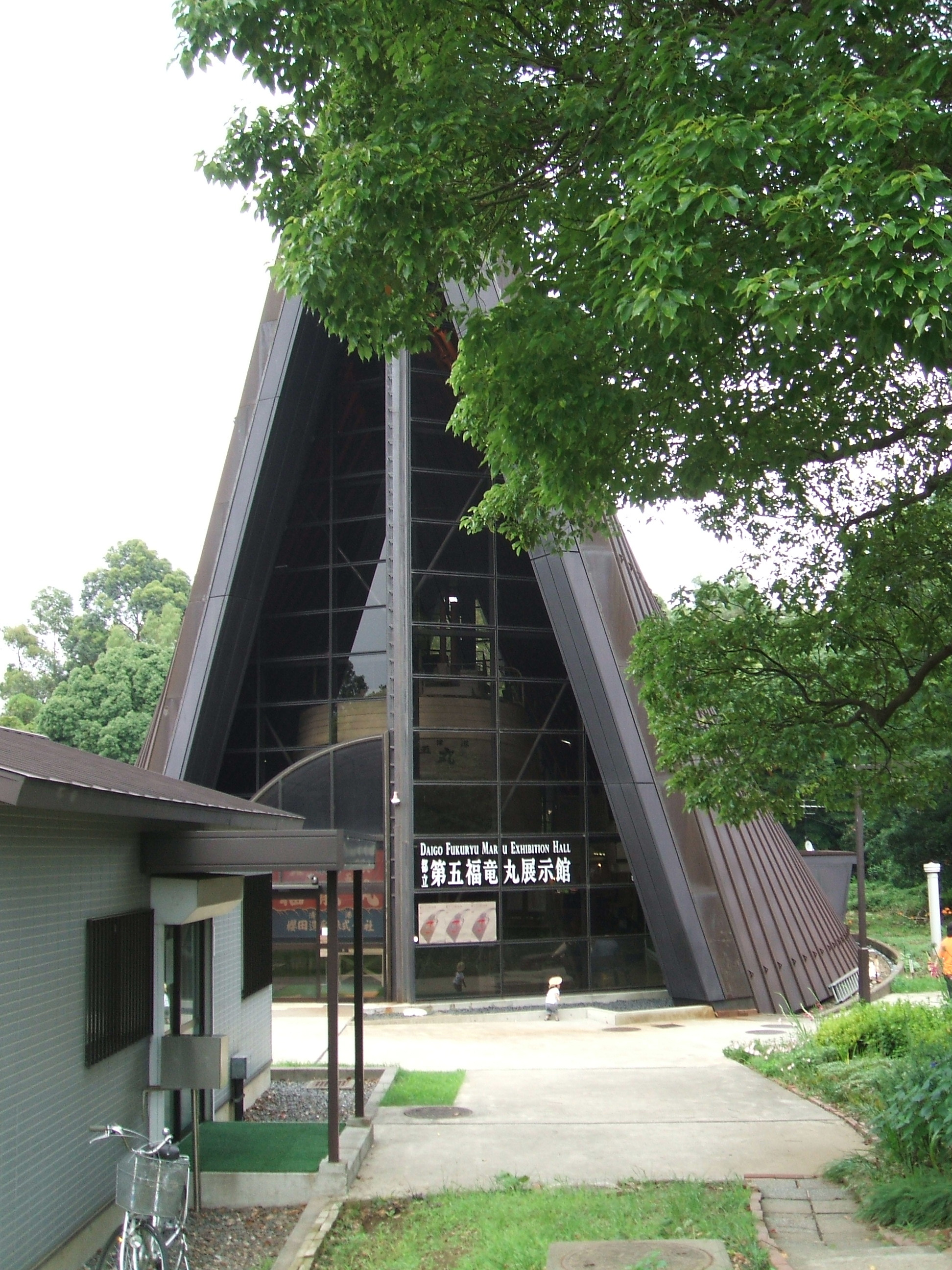
Daigo Fukuryū Maru Exhibition Hall

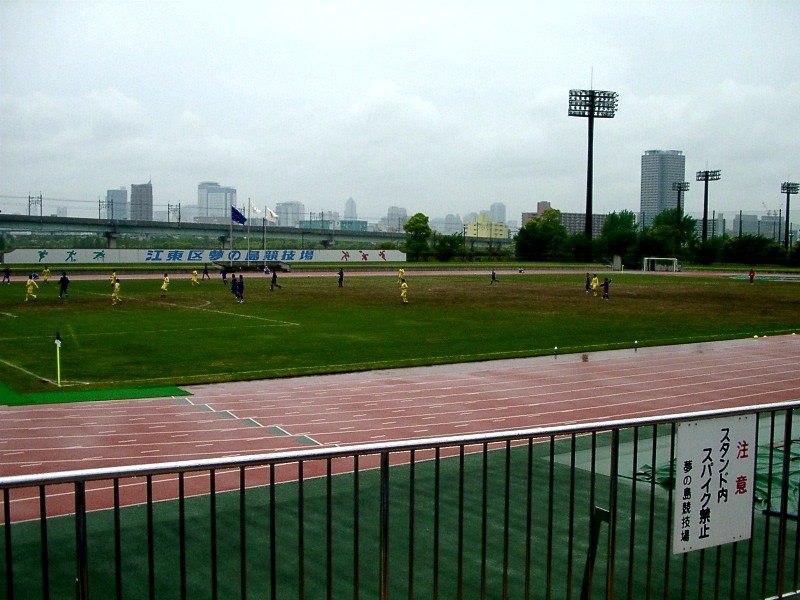
Looking at the pitch from the stands in the park

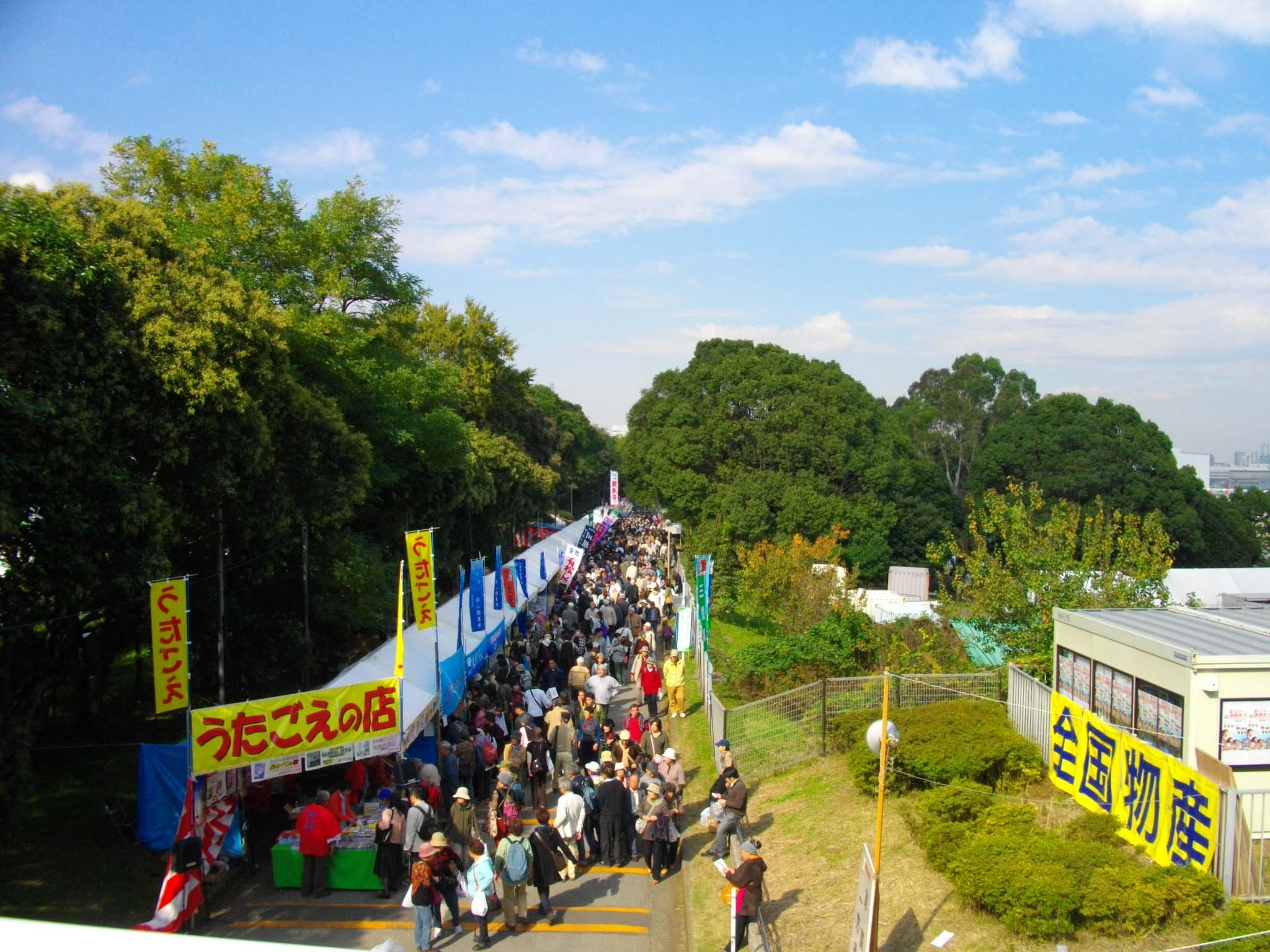
West entrance to the park during the Akahata Festival in 2010

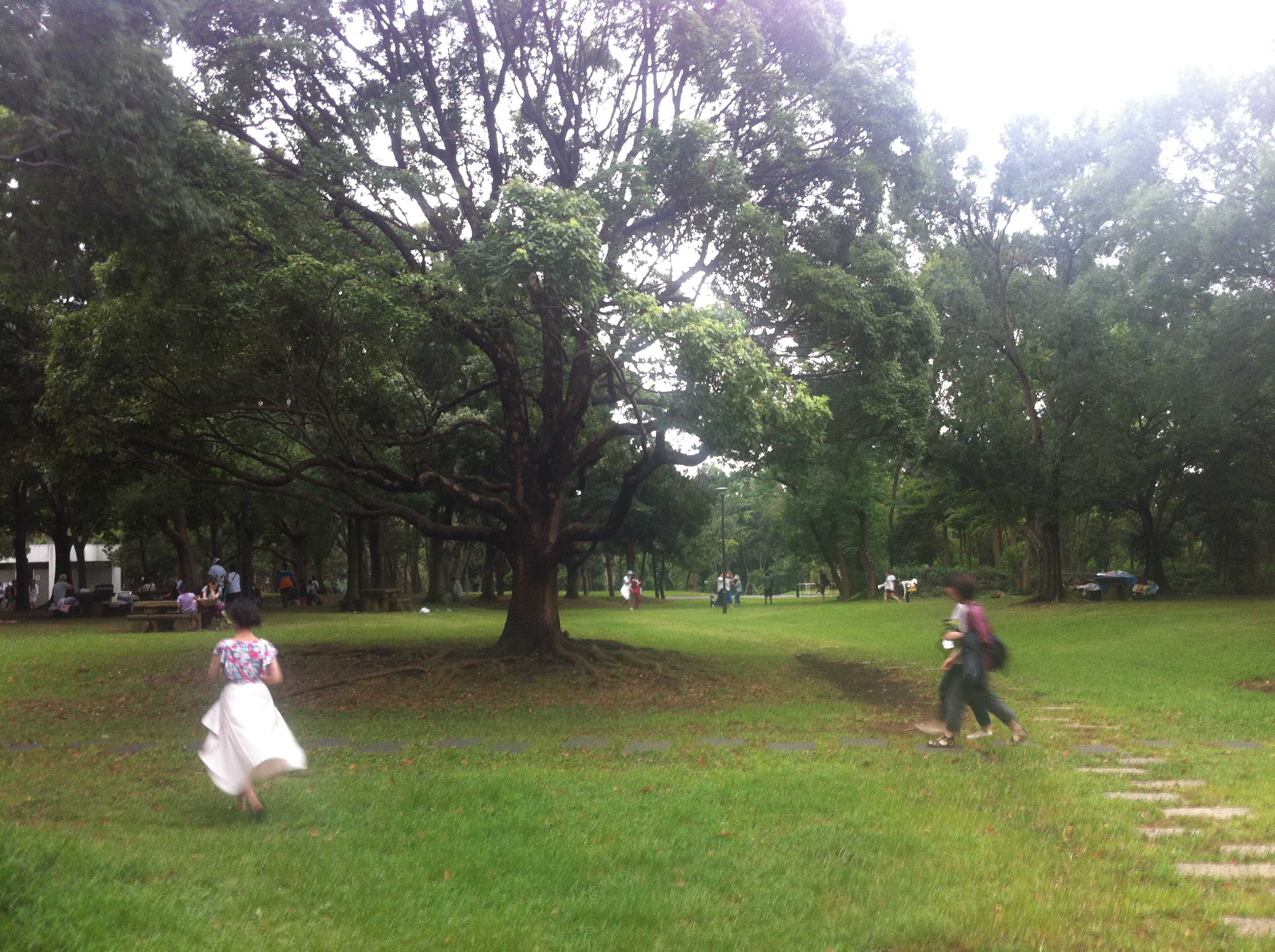
Inside the park, 2014

== Access ==
- Two minutes' walk from Shin-Kiba Station on the Tokyo Metro Yūrakuchō Line, Keiyō Line and Rinkai Line.
- Three city buses (Toei Bus) stop at the park.
- There are also two parking lots; one on the south side has space for 352 vehicles, while another on the north side can hold 103.

== See also ==
- Parks and gardens in Tokyo
- National Parks of Japan
