= Kim Min-woo (pitcher) =

South Korean baseball player (born 1995)

Hanwha Eagles – No. 53
- Pitcher
- Born: July 25, 1995 (age 31); Changwon, South Gyeongsang Province, South Korea
- Bats: Right Throws: Right

KBO debut
- April 1, 2015, for the Hanwha Eagles

KBO statistics (through April 13, 2024)
- Win–loss record: 35–59
- Earned run average: 5.25
- Strikeouts: 615
- Stats at Baseball Reference

Teams
- Hanwha Eagles (2015–present)

- Kim Min-woo
- Hangul: 김민우
- RR: Gim Minu
- MR: Kim Minu

Kim Min-woo (Korean: 김민우; born July 25, 1995) is a South Korean professional baseball pitcher currently playing for the Hanwha Eagles of the KBO League. He competed in the 2020 Summer Olympics.
