= List of South Korean archers =

South Korean archers have been dominant in modern competitive archery, particularly in the Olympic recurve discipline, since the 1980s, thanks to a mixture of public interest, domestic competition, coaching for children, innovative coaching methods, significant funding and state-of-the-art facilities. This is a partial list and timeline of archers from South Korea who have represented their country in international competitions.

== List ==
=== Recurve ===
Name	Korean name	Gender	Born	Olympic Games (1972-)	Asian Games (1978-)	World Championships (1931-)	Asian Championships (1980-)	World Cup (2006-)
An Jea-soon		F				1979		
An Se-jin	안세진	F	1981				2007 (gold) T	
Chang Hye-jin	장혜진	F	1987	2016 (gold) I (gold) T	2014 (gold) T (silver) I	2013 (gold) T		2012; 2013; 2014
Cho Mi-suk	조미숙	F	1977			1995		
Cho Youn-jeong	조윤정	F	1969	1992 (gold) I (gold) T		1991 (gold) T 1993 (gold) T (silver) I		
Choi Eun-young	최은영	F	1984			2007 (gold) T		2007 (silver) I
Choi Hyeon-ju	최현주	F	1984	2012 (gold) T				2012 (bronze) I
Choi Jin	최진	F	1980			2001		
Choi Mi-sun	최미선	F	1996				2013 (gold) T (silver) X	
Choi Nam-ok	최남옥	F	1982			2001 (bronze) T		
Choi Won-jong	최원종	M	1978			2005 (gold) T (bronze) T		
Choi Won-tae	최원태	M		1984				
Choi Young-kwang	최영광	M	1985			2003 (gold) T		
Chun In-soo	전인수	M	1965	1984; 1988 (gold) T	1986 (gold) T (bronze) (bronze) (bronze) I	1983 (silver) T 1985 (gold) T 1987; 1991 (gold) T		
Chung Chang-sook	정창숙	F	1973			1997; 1999		2007
Chung Jae-hun	정재헌	M	1974	1992 (silver) I	1994 (gold) I (silver) T	1991 (gold) T (silver) I 2005 (gold) I (gold) T	1999 (gold) I (gold) T	
Eum Sun-ki		M			1982 (gold) T	1981		
Han Gyeong-hee	한경희	F	1992			2011 (bronze) T		2011
Han Hee-jeong	한희정	F	1972		1994 (bronze) I (bronze) T			
Han Seung-hoon	한승훈	M		1992	1998 (gold) I (gold) T 2002 (gold) T	1993; 1995; 2005	1999 (gold) T (silver) I	
Ho Jin-soo	호진수	M				1985 (gold) T		
Hong Sung-chil	홍성칠	M				1997; 1999 (gold) I (silver) T	1997 (silver) I (silver) T	
Hwang Jin-hae	황진해	F	1976			1995 (gold) T		
Hwang Jin-woo	황진우	M					1999 (gold) T (bronze) I	
Hwang Sook-zoo	황숙주	F			1978 (silver) T	1979 (gold) T 1981 (silver) T		
Im Dong-hyun	임동현	M	1986	2004 (gold) T 2008 (gold) T 2012 (bronze) T	2002 (bronze) I (gold) T 2006 (gold) I (gold) T 2010 (gold) T	2003 (silver) I (gold) T 2007 (gold) I (gold) T 2009 (silver) I (gold) T 2011 (gold) T (gold) X 2013	2005 (gold) I	2006; 2007; 2008 (gold) I 2009; 2010 (silver) I 2011; 2012; 2013
Im Ji-wan	임지완	M						2007
Jang Yong-ho	장용호	M	1976	1996 (silver) T 2000 (gold) T 2004 (gold) T	2006 (gold) T	1997 (gold) T (bronze) I 1999 (silver) T 2003 (gold) T		2006; 2007
Jin Jae-wang	진재왕	M	1990				2013 (gold) T	2013
Joo Hyun-jung	주현정	F	1982	2008 (gold) T	2010 (gold) T 2014	2009 (gold) I (gold) T	2009 (gold) I (silver) T 2013 (gold) T	2008; 2009; 2010; 2013; 2014
Jun Jea-bong	정재봉	F				1983 (gold) T (silver) I		
Jung Dasomi	정다소미	F	1990		2014 (gold) I (gold) T	2011 (bronze) T	2013 (gold) T (silver) I	2011 (gold) X 2014
Jung Seung-hwa	정승화	F	1986					2007
Jung Sung-won	정성원	M	1988				2013 (gold) T (bronze) I	
Kang Hyun-ji	강현지	F	1978			1997 (gold) T	1997 (gold) T (bronze) I 1999 (gold) I	2007
Ki Bo-bae	기보배	F	1988	2012 (gold) I (gold) T	2010 (gold) T	2011 (gold) X (bronze) T 2013 (gold) T (gold) X		2010 (bronze) I 2011; 2012 (gold) I
Kim Bo-ram	김보람	M	1973	1996 (silver) T		1997 (gold) T 1999 (silver) T	1997 (silver) T (bronze) I 2005 (silver) I 2007 (bronze) T	
Kim Bub-min	김법민	M	1991	2012 (bronze) T				2012
Kim Byung-kap		M				1983 (silver) T		
Kim Chung-tae	김청태	M	1980	2000 (gold) T				
Kim Du-ri	김두리	F	1980			1997 (gold) I (gold) T	1999 (gold) T (silver) I	
Kim Hyo-jung	김효정	F				1993 (gold) I (gold) T		
Kim Jae-hyeong	김재형	M						2008
Kim Jae-rak		M				1995 (gold) T		
Kim Jin-ho	김진호	F	1961	1984 (bronze) I	1978 (gold) I (silver) T 1982 (gold) T (silver) I 1986 (gold) (gold) (silver) (silver) I (gold) T	1979 (gold) I (gold) T 1983 (gold) I (gold) T 1985 (silver) T (bronze) I		
Kim Jo-sun	김조순	F	1975	1996 (gold) T	1998 (gold) I (gold) T	1995 (gold) T 1997 (gold) T (bronze) I 1999 (bronze) I		
Kim Kyung-ho	김경호	M			1998 (gold) T (silver) T 2002 (gold) T	1993 (silver) I (silver) T 1997 (gold) I (gold) T		
Kim Kyung-wook	김경욱	F	1970	1996 (gold) I (gold) T		1989 (gold) T (silver) I 2001 (silver) I (bronze) T		
Kim Mi-ja	김미자	F			1986 (gold) T (silver) (bronze) (bronze) I			
Kim Mi-young	김미영	M			1982 (gold) T (bronze) I	1983 (gold) T		
Kim Mun-joung	김문정	F	1981		2002 (gold) T (silver) I 2010		2009 (silver) T	2010
Kim Nam-soon	김남순	F	1980	2000 (gold) T (silver) I				
Kim Sek-keoan	김석관	M			2002			
Kim Seong-hoon	김성훈	M	1991				2009 (gold) T	
Kim Soo-nyung	김수녕	F	1971	1988 (gold) I (gold) T 1992 (gold) T (silver) I 2000 (gold) T (bronze) I	1990 (gold) T (bronze) I	1989 (gold) I (gold) T 1991 (gold) I (gold) T		
Kim Sun-bin	김선빈	M			1990 (gold) T (silver) I			
Kim Sung-nam		M				1993 (silver) T		
Kim Won-sub	김원섭	M				2001	2001 (gold) I	
Kim Woo-jin	김우진	M	1992		2010 (gold) I (gold) T 2014	2011 (gold) I (gold) T		2010; 2011; 2012 (gold) I 2014
Kim Yeon-chul	김연철	M				2007 (gold) T		2007
Kim Young-woon		M			1982 (gold) T (silver) I	1983		
Kim Yu-mi	김유미	F	1986				2009 (silver) T (bronze) I	2006; 2007
Koo Ja-chung	구자청	M		1984	1986 (gold) T (silver) (silver) (silver) (bronze) I	1983 (silver) T 1985 (gold) T (silver) I 1987		
Ku Bon-chan	구본찬	M	1993		2014 (bronze) T		2013 (gold) T (silver) X	2014
Kwak Ye-ji	곽예지	F	1992			2009 (gold) T (silver) I		2008; 2009 (gold) I
Lee Chang-hwan	이창환	M	1982	2008 (gold) T	2006; 2010	2001 (gold) T 2007 (gold) T 2009 (gold) I (gold) T	2009 (gold) T	2006; 2007; 2008; 2009; 2010
Lee Dong-wook	이동욱	M					2003 (gold) I	
Lee Eun-kyung	이은경	F	1972	1992 (gold) T	1990 (gold) T (silver) I 1994 (gold) I (bronze) T 1998 (gold) T (silver) I	1991 (gold) T (silver) I 1993 (gold) T 1999 (gold) I		
Lee Han-sup	이한섭	M	1966	1988 (gold) T		1989 (bronze) T		
Lee Hee-jung	이희정	F	1974			1993; 1999	1999 (gold) T (bronze) I	
Lee Hee-sik		M		1992				
Lee Hye-yeon	이혜연	F	1981					2007
Lee Hyun-jeong	이현정	F	1983			2003 (gold) T (bronze) I		
Lee Jang-mi	이장미	F			1990 (gold) I (gold) T			
Lee Jeong-keun		M				1989		
Lee Kyung-chul	이경철	M				1995 (gold) I (gold) T		
Lee Mi-jeong	이미정	F	1979		1998 (gold) T			
Lee Seon-hee	이선희	M			1986	1991		
Lee Seung-yong		M					2009 (gold) T	
Lee Seung-yun	이승윤	M	1995		2014 (bronze) T	2013 (gold) I		2013; 2014
Lee Sung-jin	이성진	F	1985	2004 (gold) T (silver) I 2012 (gold) T		2005 (gold) I	2007 (gold) I (gold) T	2006; 2007; 2012
Lee Tuk-young	이특영	F	1989		2006 (gold) T 2014 (gold) T	2005 (gold) T (silver) I 2007 (gold) T		2006; 2007; 2014
Lee Young-ho		M			1982 (gold) T			
Lim Chae-woong		M				1981		
Lim In-tak		M				1981		
Lim Jung-ah	임정아	F			1994 (silver) I (bronze) T			
Na Young-ha		F					1999 (gold) T	
Oh Jin-hyek	오진혁	M	1981	2012 (gold) I (bronze) T	2010 (gold) T 2014 (gold) I (bronze) T	1999; 2009 (gold) T 2011 (gold) T (silver) I 2013 (gold) X (silver) I	2007 (bronze) T	2009; 2010; 2011 (gold) X 2012; 2013 (gold) I (gold) X 2014
Oh Kyo-moon	오교문	M	1972	1996 (silver) T (bronze) I 2000 (gold) T	1994 (gold) T 1998 (gold) T	1995 (gold) T (bronze) I	1997 (gold) I (silver) T	
Oh Young-sook	오영숙	F			1978 (silver) T			
Park Hye-youn	박회윤	F	1976		2002 (gold) T			
Park Jae-pyo		M			1990 (gold) T	1989 (bronze) T		
Park Jung-ah	박정아	F			1986 (gold) T (gold) (gold) (silver) (silver) (bronze) I	1985 (silver) T 1987 (silver) T		
Park Kyung-mo	박경모	M	1975	2004 (gold) T 2008 (gold) T (silver) I	1994 (gold) I (gold) T 2006 (gold) T	1993 (gold) I (silver) T 2001 (gold) T (bronze) I 2003; 2005 (gold) T	2005 (bronze) I 2007 (silver) I (bronze) T	2006 (gold) I 2008
Park Kyung-sang		M			1986			
Park Mi-kyung	박미경	F				1989; 2003		
Park Sung-hyun	박성현	F	1983	2004 (gold) I (gold) T 2008 (gold) T (silver) I			2005 (gold) I	2006; 2007; 2008 (silver) I
Park Sung-soo	박성수	M	1970	1988 (gold) T (silver) I				
Park Young-sook	박영숙	F		1984	1982 (gold) T	1979 (gold) T 1981 (silver) T 1983		
Seo Hyang-soon	서향순	F	1967	1984 (gold) I		1985 (silver) T		
Seo Man-kyo	서남교	M				1985		
Wang Hee-kyung	왕희경	F	1970	1988 (gold) T (silver) I		1987 (silver) I (silver) T 1989 (gold) T		
Whang Gin-woo		M				1991		
Woo Songi	우송기	F	1984		2001 (silver) T (silver) |			
Yang Chang-hoon	양창훈	M			1986 (gold) T (gold) (gold) (gold) (silver) I 1990 (gold) I (gold) T	1987; 1989 (bronze) T 1991 (gold) T		
Yang Kyung-soon	양경순	F				1981 (silver) T 1985		
Yeon Jung-ki	연정기	M				2001 (gold) I (gold) T		2006
Yoom Yoon-ja	염연자	F	1973			1995 (gold) T (bronze) I		
Yoon Hye-young	윤혜영	F	1977	1996 (gold) T			1997 (gold) I (gold) T	
Yun Mi-jin	윤미진	F	1983	2000 (gold) I (gold) T 2004 (gold) T	2002 (gold) T (bronze) I 2006	2003 (gold) I (gold) T 2005 (gold) T	2005 (bronze) I	2006
Yun Ok-hee	윤옥희	F	1985	2008 (gold) T (silver) I	2006 (gold) I (gold) T 2010 (gold) I (gold) T	2009 (gold) T 2013 (gold) T (bronze) I	2005 (silver) I 2007 (gold) T	2006; 2008 (bronze) I 2009 (bronze) I 2010 (gold) I 2013 (gold) I (gold) X
Yun Young-sook	윤영숙	F	1971	1988 (gold) T (bronze) I				

=== Compound ===
Name	Korean name	Gender	Born	Olympic Games not competed	Asian Games (2014-)	World Championships (1995-)	Asian Championships (tbc-)	World Cup (2006-)
Choi Bo-min		F			2014 (gold) I (gold) T	2013	2013 (bronze) I (bronze) T	2013; 2014
Choi Yong-hee		M			2014 (silver) T	2011 (bronze) X 2013	2011 (silver) T 2013 (silver) T	2013; 2014
Han Seung-hoon	한승훈	M				2009		
Hwang Saengwook	황생욱	M				2009	2009	
Jo Young-joon		M				2005		
Kim Dong-gyu		M				2007; 2009	2007 (silver) I	
Kim Hyo-sun		F				2005		
Kim Hyung-il		M					2011 (silver) T	
Kim Jong-ho		M			2014	2011; 2013	2013 (silver) T	
Kim Yun-hee		F			2014 (gold) T			
Kwon Oh-hyang		F					2007 (gold) I 2009 (gold) T 2011 (gold) T (silver) I	
Lee Hyun-jeong		F					2011 (gold) X (gold) T (silver) I	2013; 2014
Min Li-hong		M			2014 (silver) T	2011; 2013	2011 (gold) X (silver) T (bronze) I 2013 (silver) T	2013; 2014
Seo Jung-hee		F				2007; 2011; 2013	2009 (gold) T 2011 (gold) T	2013
Seok Ji-hyun		F			2014 (gold) T (silver) I	2011 (bronze) X 2013	2009 (gold) I (gold) T 2013 (gold) I (bronze) T	2013; 2014
Yang Young-ho		M			2014 (silver) T			2014
Youn So-jung		F			2014			2013
Yun Jae-won		F				2011	2013 (silver) I (bronze) T	

== Timeline ==
The following tables show which archers were selected to represent South Korea at each year's major competition, the Olympic Games, Asian Games and World Archery Championships, and medals won at each event.

Key
Part of South Korean representation at competition
Not part of South Korean representation at competition
Competition not held
(gold) Gold medal
(silver) Silver medal
(bronze) Bronze medal
I Individual
T Team
X Mixed team

=== 1970-1979 ===
==== Recurve ====
Name	Hangul	Gender	Born	1970	1971	1972	1973	1974	1975	1976	1977	1978	1979	1980-1989
Name	Hangul	Gender	Born		WAC	OG	WAC		WAC	OG	WAC	AG	WAC	1980-1989
Kim Jin-ho	김진호	F	1961									(gold) I (silver) T	(gold) I (gold) T	active->
Hwang Sook-zoo	황숙주	F										(silver) T	(gold) T	active->
Oh Young-sook		F										(silver) T		
Park Young-sook	박영숙	F											(gold) T	active->
An Jea-soon		F												
Total												1st place, gold medalist(s) 2nd place, silver medalist(s)	1st place, gold medalist(s)	

=== 1980-1989 ===
==== Recurve ====
Name	Hangul	Gender	Born	1970-1979	1980	1981	1982	1983	1984	1985	1986	1987	1988	1989	1990-1999
Name	Hangul	Gender	Born	1970-1979	OG	WAC	AG	WAC	OG	WAC	AG	WAC	OG	WAC	1990-1999
Lim Chae-woong		M													
Lim In-tak		M													
Park Ibk-soo		M													
Eum Sun-ki		M					(gold) T								
Hwang Sook-zoo	황숙주	F		<-active		(silver) T									
Park Young-sook	박영숙	F		<-active		(silver) T	(gold) T								
Yang Kyung-soon		F				(silver) T									
Kim Jin-ho	김진호	F	1961	<-active			(gold) T (silver) I	(gold) I (gold) T	(bronze) I	(silver) T (bronze) I	(gold) I-30m; (gold) I-60m; (gold) T (silver) I (silver) I-70m				
Kim Young-woon		M					(gold) T (silver) I								
Lee Young-ho		M					(gold) T								
Kim Mi-young		F					(gold) T (bronze) I	(gold) T							
Chun In-soo	전인수	M	1965					(silver) T		(gold) T	(gold) T (bronze) I-30m; (bronze) I-70m; (bronze) I-90m		(gold) T		active->
Koo Ja-chung		M						(silver) T		(gold) T (silver) I	(gold) T (silver) I-30m; (silver) I-70m; (silver) I-90m; (bronze) I				
Kim Byung-kap		M						(silver) T							
Jun Jea-bong	정재봉	F						(gold) T (silver) I							
Choi Won-tae		M													
Seo Hyang-soon	서향순	F							(gold) I	(silver) T					
Ho Jin-soo		M								(gold) T					
Seo Man-kyo		M													
Park Jung-ah		F								(silver) T	(gold) T (gold) I (gold) I-50m; (silver) I-30m; (silver) I-60m; (bronze) I-70m	(silver) T			
Yang Chang-hoon		M									(gold) T (gold) I-30m; (gold) I-50m; (gold) I-70m; (silver) I			(bronze) T	active->
Park Kyung-sang		M													
Kim Mi-ja		F									(gold) T (silver) I-50m; (bronze) I (bronze) I-30m				
Lee Seon-hee		F													active->
Wang Hee-kyung	왕희경	F	1970									(silver) I (silver) T	(gold) T (silver) I	(gold) T	
Park Sung-soo		M	1970										(gold) T (silver) I		
Lee Han-sup		M	1966										(gold) T	(bronze) T	
Kim Soo-nyung	김수녕	F	1971										(gold) I (gold) T	(gold) I (gold) T	active->
Yun Young-sook	윤영숙	F	1971										(gold) T (bronze) I		
Park Jae-pyo		M												(bronze) T	active->
Lee Jeong-keun		M													
Kim Kyung-wook		F	1970											(gold) T (silver) I	active->
Park Mi-kyung		F													active->
Total						2nd place, silver medalist(s)	1st place, gold medalist(s) 2nd place, silver medalist(s) 3rd place, bronze medalist(s)	1st place, gold medalist(s) 2nd place, silver medalist(s)	1st place, gold medalist(s) 3rd place, bronze medalist(s)	1st place, gold medalist(s) 2nd place, silver medalist(s) 3rd place, bronze medalist(s)	(gold) (gold) (gold) (gold) (gold) (gold) (gold) (gold) (gold) (silver) (silver) (silver) (silver) (silver) (silver) (silver) (silver) (silver) (bronze) (bronze) (bronze) (bronze) (bronze) (bronze) (bronze)	2nd place, silver medalist(s)	1st place, gold medalist(s) 2nd place, silver medalist(s) 3rd place, bronze medalist(s)	1st place, gold medalist(s) 2nd place, silver medalist(s) 3rd place, bronze medalist(s)	

=== 1990-1999 ===
==== Recurve ====
Name	Hangul	Gender	Born	1980-1989	1990	1991	1992	1993	1994	1995	1996	1997	1998	1999	2000-2009
Name	Hangul	Gender	Born	1980-1989	AG	WAC	OG	WAC	AG	WAC	OG	WAC	AG	WAC	2000-2009
Yang Chang-hoon		M		<-active	(gold) I (gold) T	(gold) T									
Kim Sun-bin		M			(gold) T (bronze) I										
Park Jae-pyo		M		<-active	(gold) T										
Lee Jang-mi		F			(gold) I (gold) T										
Lee Eun-kyung	이은경	F	1972		(gold) T (silver) I	(gold) T (silver) I	(gold) T	(gold) T	(gold) I (bronze) T				(gold) T (silver) I	(gold) I	
Kim Soo-nyung	김수녕	F	1971	<-active	(gold) T (bronze) I	(gold) I (gold) T	(gold) T (silver) I								active->
Chung Jae-hun	정재헌	M	1974			(gold) T (bronze) I	(silver) I		(gold) I (silver) T						active->
Chun In-soo	전인수	M	1965	<-active		(gold) T									
Whang Gin-woo		M													
Cho Youn-jeong	조윤정	F	1969			(gold) T	(gold) I (gold) T	(gold) T (silver) I							
Lee Seon-hee		F		<-active											
Han Seung-hoon	한승훈	M											(gold) I (gold) T		active->
Lee Hee-sik		M													
Park Kyung-mo	박경모	M	1975					(gold) I (silver) T	(gold) I (gold) T						active->
Kim Kyung-ho		M						(silver) I (silver) T				(gold) I (gold) T	(gold) T (silver) I		active->
Kim Sung-nam		M						(silver) T							
Lee Hee-jung		F													
Kim Hyo-jung	김효정	F						(gold) I (gold) T							
Oh Kyo-moon	오교문	M	1972						(gold) T	(gold) T (bronze) I	(silver) T (bronze) I		(gold) T		active->
Lim Jung-ah		F							(silver) I (bronze) T						
Han Hee-jeong		F							(bronze) I (bronze) T						
Lee Kyung-chul	이경철	M								(gold) I (gold) T					
Kim Jae-rak		M								(gold) T					
Yoom Yoon-ja		F								(gold) T (bronze) I					
Hwang Jin-hae		F								(gold) T					
Kim Jo-sun		F	1975							(gold) T	(gold) T	(gold) T (bronze) I	(gold) I (gold) T	(bronze) I	
Cho Mi-suk		F													
Jang Yong-ho	장용호	M	1976								(silver) T	(gold) T (bronze) I		(silver) T	active->
Kim Bo-ram		M	1976								(silver) T	(gold) T		(silver) T	
Kim Kyung-wook		F	1970	<-active							(gold) I (gold) T				active->
Yoon Hye-young	윤혜영	F	1977								(gold) T				
Hong Sung-chil	홍숭칠	M												(gold) I (silver) T	
Kim Du-ri	김둘이	F										(gold) I (gold) T			
Kang Hyun-ji		F										(gold) T			
Chung Chang-sook		F													
Lee Mi-jeong		F											(gold) T		
Oh Jin-hyek	오진혁	M	1981												active->
Total					1st place, gold medalist(s) 2nd place, silver medalist(s) 3rd place, bronze medalist(s)	1st place, gold medalist(s) 2nd place, silver medalist(s) 3rd place, bronze medalist(s)	1st place, gold medalist(s) 2nd place, silver medalist(s)	1st place, gold medalist(s) 2nd place, silver medalist(s)	1st place, gold medalist(s) 2nd place, silver medalist(s) 3rd place, bronze medalist(s)	1st place, gold medalist(s) 3rd place, bronze medalist(s)	1st place, gold medalist(s) 2nd place, silver medalist(s) 3rd place, bronze medalist(s)	1st place, gold medalist(s) 3rd place, bronze medalist(s)	1st place, gold medalist(s) 2nd place, silver medalist(s)	1st place, gold medalist(s) 2nd place, silver medalist(s) 3rd place, bronze medalist(s)	

=== 2000-2009 ===
==== Recurve ====
Name	Hangul	Gender	Born	1990-1999	2000	2001	2002	2003	2004	2005	2006	2007	2008	2009	2010-2019
Name	Hangul	Gender	Born	1990-1999	OG	WAC	AG	WAC	OG	WAC	AG	WAC	OG	WAC	2010-2019
Jang Yong-ho	장용호	M	1976	<-active	(gold) T			(gold) T	(gold) T		(gold) T				
Kim Chung-tae	김청태	M	1980		(gold) T										
Oh Kyo-moon	오교문	M	1972	<-active	(gold) T										
Yun Mi-jin	윤미진	F	1984		(gold) I (gold) T		(bronze) I (gold) T	(gold) I (gold) T	(gold) T	(gold) T					
Kim Nam-soon	김남순	F	1980		(silver) I (gold) T										
Kim Soo-nyung	김수녕	F	1971	<-active	(bronze) I (gold) T										
Yeon Jung-ki	연웅기	M				(gold) I (gold) T									
Park Kyung-mo	박경모	M	1975	<-active		(bronze) I (gold) T			(gold) T	(gold) T	(gold) T		(silver) I (gold) T		
Lee Chang-hwan	이창환	M	1982			(gold) T						(gold) T	(gold) T	(gold) I (gold) T	active->
Kim Won-sub		M	1982												
Park Sung-hyun	박성현	F	1983			(gold) I (bronze) T		(silver) I (gold) T	(gold) I (gold) T	(bronze) I (gold) T	(gold) I (gold) T	(silver) I (gold) T	(silver) I (gold) T		
Kim Kyung-wook	곽예지	F	1970	<-active		(silver) I (bronze) T									
Choi Nam-ok		F				(bronze) T									
Choi Jin		F													
Im Dong-hyun	임동현	M	1986				(bronze) I (gold) T	(silver) I (gold) T	(gold) T		(gold) I (gold) T	(gold) I (gold) T	(gold) T	(silver) I (gold) T	active->
Han Seung-hoon	한승훈	M		<-active			(gold) T								
Kim Kyung-ho		M		<-active			(gold) T								
Kim Sek-keoan		M													
Kim Mun-joung		F	1981				(silver) I (gold) T								active->
Park Hye-youn		F					(gold) T								
Choi Young-kwang		M						(gold) T							
Lee Hyun-jeong		F						(bronze) I (gold) T							
Park Mi-kyung		F		<-active											
Lee Sung-jin	이성진	F	1985						(silver) I (gold) T	(gold) I					active->
Chung Jae-hun	정재헌	M	1974	<-active						(gold) I (gold) T					
Choi Won-jong	최원종	M	1978							(bronze) I (gold) T					
Lee Tuk-young	이특영	F	1989							(silver) I (gold) T	(gold) T	(gold) T			
Yun Ok-hee	윤옥희	F	1985								(gold) I (gold) T		(silver) I (gold) T	(gold) T	active->
Kim Yeon-chul		M										(gold) T			
Choi Eun-young		F										(gold) T			
Joo Hyun-jung	주현정	F	1982										(gold) T	(gold) I (gold) T	active->
Oh Jin-hyek	오진혁	M	1981	<-active										(gold) T	active->
Kwak Ye-ji	곽예지	F	1992											(silver) I (gold) T	
Total					1st place, gold medalist(s) 2nd place, silver medalist(s) 3rd place, bronze medalist(s)	1st place, gold medalist(s) 2nd place, silver medalist(s) 3rd place, bronze medalist(s)	1st place, gold medalist(s) 2nd place, silver medalist(s) 3rd place, bronze medalist(s)	1st place, gold medalist(s) 2nd place, silver medalist(s) 3rd place, bronze medalist(s)	1st place, gold medalist(s) 2nd place, silver medalist(s)	1st place, gold medalist(s) 2nd place, silver medalist(s) 3rd place, bronze medalist(s)	1st place, gold medalist(s) 2nd place, silver medalist(s)	1st place, gold medalist(s) 2nd place, silver medalist(s)	1st place, gold medalist(s) 2nd place, silver medalist(s) 3rd place, bronze medalist(s)	1st place, gold medalist(s) 2nd place, silver medalist(s)	

=== 2010-2019 ===
==== Recurve ====
Name	Hangul	Gender	Born	2000-2009	2010	2011	2012	2013	2014	2015	2016	2017	2018	2019	2020-2029
Name	Hangul	Gender	Born	2000-2009	AG	WAC	OG	WAC	AG	WAC	OG	WAC	AG	WAC	2020-2029
Im Dong-hyun	임동현	M	1986	<-active	(gold) T	(gold) T (gold) X	(bronze) T								
Kim Woo-jin	김우진	M	1992		(gold) I (gold) T	(gold) I (gold) T									
Oh Jin-hyek	오진혁	M	1981	<-active	(gold) T	(gold) T (silver) I	(gold) I (bronze) T	(gold) X (silver) I	(gold) I (bronze) T						
Lee Chang-hwan	이창환	M	1982	<-active											
Yun Ok-hee	윤옥희	F	1985	<-active	(gold) I (gold) T			(gold) T (bronze) I							
Ki Bo-bae	기보배	F	1988		(gold) T	(gold) X (bronze) T	(gold) I (gold) T	(gold) T (gold) X							
Joo Hyun-jung	주현정	F	1982	<-active	(gold) T										
Kim Mun-joung		F	1981	<-active											
Jung Dasomi	정다소미	F	1990			(bronze) T			(gold) I (gold) T						
Han Gyeong-hee	한경희	F	1992			(bronze) T									
Kim Bub-min	김법민	M	1991				(bronze) T								
Choi Hyeon-ju	최현주	F	1984				(gold) T								
Lee Sung-jin	이성진	F	1985	<-active			(gold) T								
Lee Seung-yun	이승윤	M	1995					(gold) I	(bronze) T						
Chang Hye-jin	장혜진	F	1987					(gold) T	(gold) T (silver) I						
Ku Bon-chan	구본찬	M	1993						(bronze) T						
Lee Tuk-young	이특영	F	1989	<-active					(gold) T						
Choi Mi-Sun	최미선	F	1996												
Kang Chae-young	강채영	F	1996												
Total					1st place, gold medalist(s)	1st place, gold medalist(s) 2nd place, silver medalist(s) 3rd place, bronze medalist(s)	1st place, gold medalist(s) 3rd place, bronze medalist(s)	1st place, gold medalist(s) 2nd place, silver medalist(s) 3rd place, bronze medalist(s)	1st place, gold medalist(s) 2nd place, silver medalist(s) 3rd place, bronze medalist(s)						

== See also ==
- Korean archery
- Archery
