= Archery at the 1998 Asian Games – Men's individual =

Men's individual recurve at the 1998 Asian Games
- Venue: Thammasat Field
- Dates: 13–16 December 1998
- Competitors: 47 from 15 nations

Medalists
gold medal	Han Seung-hoon	South Korea
silver medal	Kim Kyung-ho	South Korea
bronze medal	Wataru Haraguchi	Japan

The men's individual recurve competition at the 1998 Asian Games in Bangkok, Thailand was held from 13 to 16 December 1998 at Thammasat University.

== Schedule ==
All times are Indochina Time (UTC+07:00)

Date	Time	Event
Sunday, 13 December 1998	14:00	Qualification 90 m
Sunday, 13 December 1998	15:30	Qualification 70 m
Monday, 14 December 1998	14:00	Qualification 50 m
Monday, 14 December 1998	15:30	Qualification 30 m
Wednesday, 16 December 1998	08:00	Round of 32
Wednesday, 16 December 1998	08:00	Round of 16
Wednesday, 16 December 1998	14:00	Quarterfinals
Wednesday, 16 December 1998	15:25	Semifinals
Wednesday, 16 December 1998	16:10	Finals

== Results ==
Legend

- DNS — Did not start

=== Qualification ===
Rank	Athlete	Score
1	Han Seung-hoon (KOR)	1323
2	Oh Kyo-moon (KOR)	1306
3	Kim Kyung-ho (KOR)	1297
4	Hiroshi Yamamoto (JPN)	1283
5	Kim Sun-bin (KOR)	1272
6	Wu Tsung-yi (TPE)	1272
7	Hironobu Sueguchi (JPN)	1267
8	Zhao Faqiao (CHN)	1267
9	Takayoshi Matsushita (JPN)	1258
10	Tang Hua (CHN)	1257
11	Vadim Shikarev (KAZ)	1256
12	Alexandr Kislitsyn (KAZ)	1254
13	Chiu Po-han (TPE)	1251
14	Maxim Yelisseyev (KAZ)	1249
15	Sergey Martynov (KAZ)	1239
16	Chang Chia-pin (TPE)	1238
17	Rinzin Chhophel (BHU)	1236
18	Gao Yu (CHN)	1235
19	Yang Bo (CHN)	1228
20	Wataru Haraguchi (JPN)	1228
21	Jubzhang (BHU)	1223
22	Satyadev Prasad (IND)	1222
23	Mangal Singh Champia (IND)	1222
24	Hendra Setijawan (INA)	1215
25	Oscar Briones (PHI)	1210
26	Skalzang Dorje (IND)	1210
27	Prawit Poljungleed (THA)	1207
28	Chin Phaoai (THA)	1193
29	Rajesh Hasdak (IND)	1186
30	Wahyu Hidayat (INA)	1175
31	Chan Kam Shing (HKG)	1174
32	Yulianto (INA)	1171
33	Latip Pramono (INA)	1165
34	Christian Cubilla (PHI)	1161
35	Tashi Peljor (BHU)	1156
36	Michael Facundo (PHI)	1152
37	Tempa (BHU)	1150
38	Prayad Mookdaon (THA)	1096
39	Vigen Shahbazian (IRI)	1082
40	Au Yeung Lai Tak (HKG)	1073
41	Pipat Talubkaew (THA)	1072
—	Kourosh Karimzadeh (IRI)	DNS
—	Gombodorjiin Gan-Erdene (MGL)	DNS
—	Safar Negmatov (TJK)	DNS
—	Philip Tamer (LIB)	DNS
—	Joseph Haykal (LIB)	DNS
—	J. Gerelkhuyag (MGL)	DNS

=== Knockout round ===
==== Finals ====
Final
1	Han Seung-hoon (KOR)	113
3	Kim Kyung-ho (KOR)	112

Bronze medal match
20	Wataru Haraguchi (JPN)	109
2	Oh Kyo-moon (KOR)	116

- Wataru Haraguchi was awarded bronze because of no three-medal sweep per country rule.

==== Top half ====
Round of 32
1	Han Seung-hoon (KOR)	166
32	Yulianto (INA)	144
17	Rinzin Chhophel (BHU)	157
16	Chang Chia-pin (TPE)	158
9	Takayoshi Matsushita (JPN)	150
24	Hendra Setijawan (INA)	159
25	Oscar Briones (PHI)	165
8	Zhao Faqiao (CHN)	164
5	Kim Sun-bin (KOR)	165
28	Chin Phaoai (THA)	154
21	Jubzhang (BHU)	153
12	Alexandr Kislitsyn (KAZ)	156
13	Chiu Po-han (TPE)	161
20	Wataru Haraguchi (JPN)	162
29	Rajesh Hasdak (IND)	160
4	Hiroshi Yamamoto (JPN)	158

Round of 16
1	Han Seung-hoon (KOR)	166
16	Chang Chia-pin (TPE)	153
24	Hendra Setijawan (INA)	155
25	Oscar Briones (PHI)	161
5	Kim Sun-bin (KOR)	170
12	Alexandr Kislitsyn (KAZ)	147
20	Wataru Haraguchi (JPN)	152
29	Rajesh Hasdak (IND)	149

Quarterfinals
1	Han Seung-hoon (KOR)	109
25	Oscar Briones (PHI)	101
5	Kim Sun-bin (KOR)	106
20	Wataru Haraguchi (JPN)	110

Semifinals
1	Han Seung-hoon (KOR)	114
20	Wataru Haraguchi (JPN)	106

==== Bottom half ====
Round of 32
3	Kim Kyung-ho (KOR)	166
30	Wahyu Hidayat (INA)	152
19	Yang Bo (CHN)	153
14	Maxim Yelisseyev (KAZ)	161
11	Vadim Shikarev (KAZ)	154
22	Satyadev Prasad (IND)	156
27	Prawit Poljungleed (THA)	170
6	Wu Tsung-yi (TPE)	171
7	Hironobu Sueguchi (JPN)	161
26	Skalzang Dorje (IND)	162
23	Mangal Singh Champia (IND)	145
10	Tang Hua (CHN)	166
15	Sergey Martynov (KAZ)	152
18	Gao Yu (CHN)	162
31	Chan Kam Shing (HKG)	146
2	Oh Kyo-moon (KOR)	166

Round of 16
3	Kim Kyung-ho (KOR)	160
14	Maxim Yelisseyev (KAZ)	152
22	Satyadev Prasad (IND)	155
6	Wu Tsung-yi (TPE)	165
26	Skalzang Dorje (IND)	159
10	Tang Hua (CHN)	161
18	Gao Yu (CHN)	152
2	Oh Kyo-moon (KOR)	164

Quarterfinals
3	Kim Kyung-ho (KOR)	106
6	Wu Tsung-yi (TPE)	104
10	Tang Hua (CHN)	102
2	Oh Kyo-moon (KOR)	106

Semifinals
3	Kim Kyung-ho (KOR)	112
2	Oh Kyo-moon (KOR)	108
