= Archery at the 1998 Asian Games – Men's team =

Men's team recurve at the 1998 Asian Games
- Venue: Thammasat Field
- Dates: 13–17 December 1998
- Competitors: 38 from 10 nations

Medalists
gold medal	South Korea; Han Seung-hoon, Kim Kyung-ho, Oh Kyo-moon
silver medal	Chinese Taipei; Chang Chia-pin, Chiu Po-han, Wu Tsung-yi
bronze medal	China; Gao Yu, Tang Hua, Zhao Faqiao

The men's team recurve competition at the 1998 Asian Games in Bangkok, Thailand was held from 13 to 17 December 1998 at Thammasat University.

Each team consisted of the highest ranked three athletes from the qualification round.

== Schedule ==
All times are Indochina Time (UTC+07:00)

Date	Time	Event
Sunday, 13 December 1998	14:00	Qualification 90 m
Sunday, 13 December 1998	15:30	Qualification 70 m
Monday, 14 December 1998	14:00	Qualification 50 m
Monday, 14 December 1998	15:30	Qualification 30 m
Thursday, 17 December 1998	14:00	Quarterfinals
Thursday, 17 December 1998	15:20	Semifinals
Thursday, 17 December 1998	16:10	Finals

== Results ==
=== Qualification ===
Rank	Team	Score
1	South Korea (KOR)	3926
	Han Seung-hoon	1323
	Kim Kyung-ho	1297
	Kim Sun-bin	~~1272~~
	Oh Kyo-moon	1306
2	Japan (JPN)	3808
	Wataru Haraguchi	~~1228~~
	Takayoshi Matsushita	1258
	Hironobu Sueguchi	1267
	Hiroshi Yamamoto	1283
3	Chinese Taipei (TPE)	3761
	Chang Chia-pin	1238
	Chiu Po-han	1251
	Wu Tsung-yi	1272
4	Kazakhstan (KAZ)	3759
	Alexandr Kislitsyn	1254
	Sergey Martynov	~~1239~~
	Vadim Shikarev	1256
	Maxim Yelisseyev	1249
5	China (CHN)	3759
	Gao Yu	1235
	Tang Hua	1257
	Yang Bo	~~1228~~
	Zhao Faqiao	1267
6	India (IND)	3654
	Mangal Singh Champia	1222
	Skalzang Dorje	1210
	Rajesh Hasdak	~~1186~~
	Satyadev Prasad	1222
7	Bhutan (BHU)	3615
	Rinzin Chhophel	1236
	Jubzhang	1223
	Tashi Peljor	1156
	Tempa	~~1150~~
8	Indonesia (INA)	3561
	Wahyu Hidayat	1175
	Latip Pramono	~~1165~~
	Hendra Setijawan	1215
	Yulianto	1171
9	Philippines (PHI)	3523
	Oscar Briones	1210
	Christian Cubilla	1161
	Michael Facundo	1152
10	Thailand (THA)	3496
	Chin Phaoai	1193
	Prawit Poljungleed	1207
	Prayad Mookdaon	1096
	Pipat Talubkaew	~~1072~~

=== Knockout round ===
Quarterfinals
1	South Korea	248
8	Indonesia	230
5	China	238
4	Kazakhstan	232
3	Chinese Taipei	236
6	India	223
7	Bhutan	232
2	Japan	231

Semifinals
1	South Korea	242
5	China	241
3	Chinese Taipei	238
7	Bhutan	233

Final
1	South Korea	246
3	Chinese Taipei	238
Bronze medal match
5	China	231
7	Bhutan	227
