= Archery at the 1998 Asian Games =

- Venue: Thammasat Field
- Dates: 13–17 December 1998
- Competitors: 91 from 16 nations

Archery was contested from December 13 to December 17 at the 1998 Asian Games at the Thammasat University, in Bangkok, Thailand.

South Korea dominated the competition winning all four gold medals.

== Schedule ==
R	Ranking round	F	Elimination rounds & Finals

Event↓/Date →	13th Sun	14th Mon	15th Tue	16th Wed	17th Thu
Men's individual	R	R		F	
Men's team	R	R			F
Women's individual	R	R	F		
Women's team	R	R			F

== Medalists ==
Event	Gold	Silver	Bronze
Men's individual	Han Seung-hoon; South Korea	Kim Kyung-ho; South Korea	Wataru Haraguchi; Japan
Men's team	South Korea; Han Seung-hoon; Kim Kyung-ho; Oh Kyo-moon	Chinese Taipei; Chang Chia-pin; Chiu Po-han; Wu Tsung-yi	China; Gao Yu; Tang Hua; Zhao Faqiao
Women's individual	Kim Jo-sun; South Korea	Lee Eun-kyung; South Korea	Lin Sang; China
Women's team	South Korea; Kim Jo-sun; Lee Eun-kyung; Lee Mi-jeong	China; He Ying; Lin Sang; Wang Xiaozhu	Kazakhstan; Viktoriya Beloslyudtseva; Irina Leonova; Yelena Plotnikova

== Medal table ==
Rank	Nation	Gold	Silver	Bronze	Total
1	South Korea (KOR)	4	2	0	6
2	China (CHN)	0	1	2	3
3	Chinese Taipei (TPE)	0	1	0	1
4	Japan (JPN)	0	0	1	1
4	Kazakhstan (KAZ)	0	0	1	1
Totals (5 entries)		4	4	4	12

== Participating nations ==
A total of 91 athletes from 16 nations competed in archery at the 1998 Asian Games:

- Bhutan (8)
- China (8)
- Chinese Taipei (7)
- Hong Kong (3)
- India (4)
- Indonesia (8)
- Iran (2)
- Japan (8)
- Kazakhstan (8)
- Lebanon (2)
- Mongolia (6)
- Myanmar (3)
- Philippines (7)
- South Korea (8)
- Tajikistan (1)
- Thailand (8)
