= Archery at the 2002 Asian Games – Men's team =

Men's team recurve at the 2002 Asian Games
- Venue: Gangseo Archery Field
- Dates: 6–10 October 2002
- Competitors: 51 from 13 nations

Medalists
gold medal	South Korea; Han Seung-hoon, Im Dong-hyun, Kim Kyung-ho, Kim Sek-keoan
silver medal	Chinese Taipei; Chen Szu-yuan, Liao Chien-nan, Liu Ming-huang, Wang Cheng-pang
bronze medal	Kazakhstan; Alexandr Li, Vitaliy Shin, Maxim Yelisseyev, Stanislav Zabrodskiy

The men's team recurve competition at the 2002 Asian Games in Busan, South Korea was held from 6 to 10 October at the Gangseo Archery Field.

== Schedule ==
All times are Korea Standard Time (UTC+09:00)

Date	Time	Event
Sunday, 6 October 2002	14:30	Qualification 90 m
Sunday, 6 October 2002	16:00	Qualification 70 m
Monday, 7 October 2002	14:30	Qualification 50 m
Monday, 7 October 2002	16:00	Qualification 30 m
Thursday, 10 October 2002	14:00	1/8 finals
Thursday, 10 October 2002	14:40	Quarterfinals
Thursday, 10 October 2002	15:00	Semifinals
Thursday, 10 October 2002	15:50	3rd–4th place
Thursday, 10 October 2002	16:15	Final

== Results ==
Legend

- DNS — Did not start

=== Qualification ===
Rank	Team	Distance				Total	10s	Xs
Rank	Team	90m	70m	50m	30m	Total	10s	Xs
1	South Korea (KOR)	940	1012	991	1060	4003	211	84
	Han Seung-hoon	304	339	331	352	1326	70	26
	Im Dong-hyun	311	329	339	357	1336	70	28
	Kim Kyung-ho	325	344	321	351	1341	71	30
	Kim Sek-keoan	~~296~~	~~338~~	~~336~~	~~355~~	~~1325~~	~~70~~	~~25~~
2	Japan (JPN)	939	988	974	1042	3943	176	59
	Yuji Hamano	310	329	327	350	1316	60	26
	Yoshimasa Inoue	~~290~~	~~307~~	~~304~~	~~348~~	~~1249~~	~~43~~	~~18~~
	Koichi Shiota	317	320	314	340	1291	49	12
	Hiroshi Yamamoto	312	339	333	352	1336	67	21
3	China (CHN)	909	994	979	1046	3928	177	63
	Chen Hongyuan	300	333	328	352	1313	58	18
	Huang Zhongsheng	302	334	326	348	1310	60	21
	Li Xiaofeng	307	327	325	346	1305	59	24
	Xue Haifeng	~~291~~	~~323~~	~~332~~	~~357~~	~~1303~~	~~60~~	~~23~~
4	India (IND)	909	988	982	1038	3917	187	66
	Ved Kumar	~~292~~	~~316~~	~~319~~	~~344~~	~~1271~~	~~48~~	~~18~~
	Satyadev Prasad	309	327	322	345	1303	58	26
	Limba Ram	305	328	323	345	1301	68	28
	Kailash Sharma	295	333	337	348	1313	61	12
5	Kazakhstan (KAZ)	904	976	973	1026	3879	159	53
	Alexandr Li	294	317	319	342	1272	51	13
	Vitaliy Shin	~~280~~	~~289~~	~~317~~	~~344~~	~~1230~~	~~41~~	~~19~~
	Maxim Yelisseyev	303	327	323	334	1287	47	15
	Stanislav Zabrodskiy	307	332	331	350	1320	61	25
6	Chinese Taipei (TPE)	898	953	957	1047	3855	145	53
	Chen Szu-yuan	295	320	329	358	1302	61	25
	Liao Chien-nan	303	320	315	351	1289	47	18
	Liu Ming-huang	~~280~~	~~316~~	~~310~~	~~341~~	~~1247~~	~~37~~	~~16~~
	Wang Cheng-pang	300	313	313	338	1264	37	10
7	Bhutan (BHU)	896	961	970	1019	3846	138	38
	Rinzin Chhophel	303	327	334	350	1314	58	20
	Tashi Dorji	280	312	318	330	1240	34	5
	Tashi Peljor	313	322	318	339	1292	46	13
	Tempa Tempa	~~257~~	~~300~~	~~300~~	~~332~~	~~1189~~	~~30~~	~~7~~
8	Uzbekistan (UZB)	868	967	941	1027	3803	135	48
	Zamir Ahmedov	300	323	310	342	1275	41	17
	Ildar Sayfullin	286	323	313	345	1267	47	19
	Amet Umerov	282	321	318	340	1261	47	12
9	Myanmar (MYA)	870	942	951	1035	3798	138	50
	Nan Aung	297	312	322	349	1280	55	12
	Nyi Nyi Tun	279	315	308	345	1247	42	22
	Win Min Zaw	~~289~~	~~305~~	~~303~~	~~336~~	~~1233~~	~~32~~	~~12~~
	Yan Aung Soe	294	315	321	341	1271	41	16
10	Philippines (PHI)	890	968	959	966	3783	134	43
	Marvin Cordero	313	333	326	344	1316	59	22
	Christian Cubilla	301	321	313	345	1280	40	16
	Florante Matan	276	314	320	277	1187	35	5
	Arnold Rojas	~~270~~	~~313~~	~~299~~	~~272~~	~~1154~~	~~16~~	~~3~~
11	Mongolia (MGL)	854	939	920	1012	3725	112	34
	Gombodorjiin Gan-Erdene	293	302	307	335	1237	36	10
	Jantsangiin Gantögs	294	323	321	347	1285	52	20
	Togoogiin Tsogtbayar	267	314	292	330	1203	24	4
	Baatarjavyn Zolboo	~~245~~	~~274~~	~~295~~	~~310~~	~~1124~~	~~17~~	~~8~~
12	Qatar (QAT)	784	887	921	1015	3607	109	21
	Abdulla Abdulla	~~227~~	~~285~~	~~278~~	~~281~~	~~1071~~	~~9~~	~~0~~
	Ahmed Al-Abadi	250	248	282	331	1111	23	8
	Farhan Monser	271	328	328	342	1269	48	6
	Ali Ahmed Salem	263	311	311	342	1227	38	7
13	Sri Lanka (SRI)	697	796	831	957	3281	65	21
	Hetti Bandara Dharmasena	233	260	254	315	1062	15	4
	Prasad Fernando					~~DNS~~		
	P. C. N. N. Rajawardana	227	266	292	327	1112	21	7
	Rajeeva Wickramasinghe	237	270	285	315	1107	29	10

=== Knockout round ===
1/8 finals
9	Myanmar	234
8	Uzbekistan	226
5	Kazakhstan	231
12	Qatar	219
13	Sri Lanka	199
4	India	235
11	Mongolia	222
6	Chinese Taipei	229
7	Bhutan	237
10	Philippines	228

Quarterfinals
1	South Korea	250
9	Myanmar	246
5	Kazakhstan	242
4	India	239
3	China	234
6	Chinese Taipei	236
7	Bhutan	235
2	Japan	243

Semifinals
1	South Korea	240
5	Kazakhstan	235
6	Chinese Taipei	244
2	Japan	238

Final
1	South Korea	245
6	Chinese Taipei	238
3rd–4th place
5	Kazakhstan	237
2	Japan	235
