= Poikolainen =

Poikolainen is a Finnish surname. Notable people with the surname include:

- Tomi Poikolainen (born 1961), Finnish Olympic archer
- Rauni Poikolainen (born 1962), Finnish long track speed skater
- Jutta Poikolainen (born 1963), Finnish Olympic archer, wife of Tomi
