= Lyudmila Arzhannikova =

Soviet archer (born 1958)

Medal record

Women's archery

Olympic Games

Representing Unified Team
Bronze medal – third place	1992 Barcelona	Team

World Championships

Representing Soviet Union
Gold medal – first place	1985 Seoul	Team
Gold medal – first place	1987 Adelaide	Team
Silver medal – second place	1985 Seoul	Individual
Silver medal – second place	1991 Kraków	Team
Bronze medal – third place	1989 Lausanne	Team

European Championships

Representing Soviet Union
Gold medal – first place	1982 Kecskemét	Team
Gold medal – first place	1986 Izmir	Individual
Gold medal – first place	1986 Izmir	Team
Gold medal – first place	1988 Luxembourg City	Individual
Gold medal – first place	1988 Luxembourg City	Team
Gold medal – first place	1990 Barcelona	Team
Silver medal – second place	1990 Barcelona	Individual
Bronze medal – third place	1982 Kecskemét	Individual

Representing CIS
Gold medal – first place	1992 La Valletta	Team

Representing Netherlands
Bronze medal – third place	1996 Kranjska Gora	Team

European Indoor Championships

Representing Soviet Union
Gold medal – first place	1983 Falun	Team
Gold medal – first place	1987 Paris	Team
Gold medal – first place	1987 Paris	Individual
Bronze medal – third place	1983 Falun	Individual

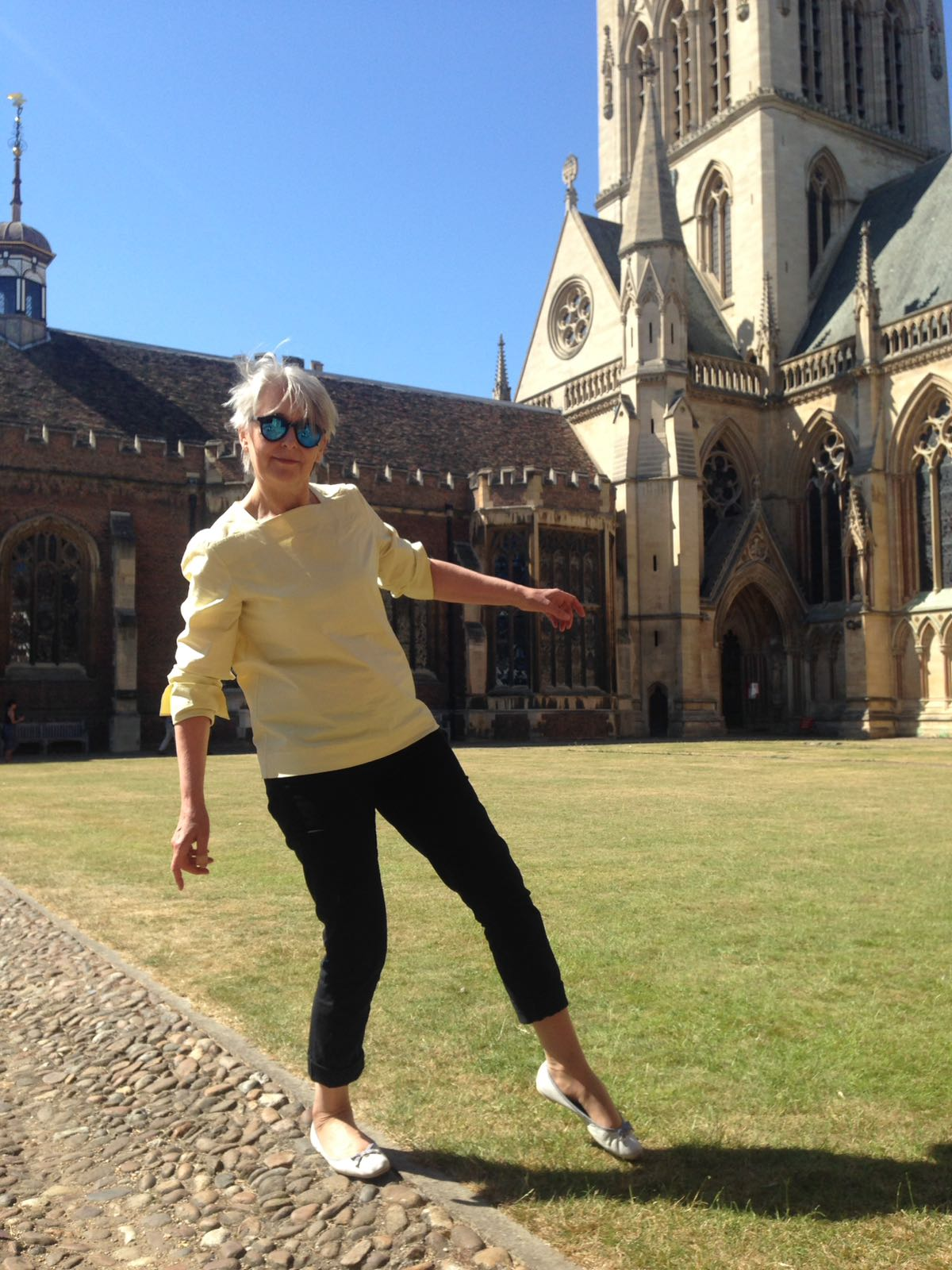
Arzhannikova in February 2020

Lyudmila Leonidova Arzhannikova (Ukrainian: Людмила Леонідівна Аржаннікова) (born 15 March 1958 in Kamianske) is an Olympic archer.

== Career ==
She competed for the Soviet Union at the 1988 Summer Olympics IV individuel and IV with team, for the Unified Team at the 1992 Summer Olympics, and for the Netherlands at the 1996 Summer Olympics 1/8 finale.
