= Richard McKinney (archer) =

American archer (born 1953)

Personal information
- Full name: Richard Lee McKinney
- Born: October 12, 1953 (age 73) Decatur, Indiana, U.S.
Medal record
Men's Archery
Representing United States
Olympic Games
Silver medal – second place	1984 Los Angeles	Individual
Silver medal – second place	1988 Seoul	Team
Pan American Games
Gold medal – first place	1979 San Juan	Team
Gold medal – first place	1983 Caracas	Team
Gold medal – first place	1987 Indianapolis	Team
Gold medal – first place	1995 Mar del Plata	Team
Silver medal – second place	1983 Caracas	Individual
World Championships
Gold medal – first place	1975 Interlaken	Team
Gold medal – first place	1977 Canberra	Individual
Gold medal – first place	1977 Canberra	Team
Gold medal – first place	1979 Berlin	Team
Gold medal – first place	1981 Punta Ala	Team
Gold medal – first place	1983 Los Angeles	Individual
Gold medal – first place	1983 Los Angeles	Team
Gold medal – first place	1985 Seoul	Individual
Silver medal – second place	1975 Interlaken	Individual
Silver medal – second place	1979 Berlin	Individual
Silver medal – second place	1985 Seoul	Team
Silver medal – second place	1989 Lausanne	Team
Bronze medal – third place	1981 Punta Ala	Individual
Bronze medal – third place	1991 Krakow	Team
Bronze medal – third place	1995 Jakarta	Team

Richard Lee McKinney (born October 12, 1953) is an archer from the United States, who competed in the Olympic Games four times, winning a pair of silver medals.

== Career ==
McKinney was born in Decatur, Indiana. After finishing fourth in the individual event at the 1976 Summer Olympics, he won the world title in 1977 and again in 1983. He finished second at the 1984 Summer Olympics to teammate and long-time rival Darrell Pace. In the 1988 Games, he was sixth in the individual event and added a silver medal in the team event along with Pace and Jay Barrs. He also competed in the 1992 Olympics.

McKinney was a nine-time national champion, and represented the United States at 10 editions of the World Archery Championships between 1975 and 1995. He won the individual title three times and the team title five consecutive times, making him the most successful US archer and second most successful male archer of all time. His back-to-back titles in 1983 and 1985 was the last time any male archer won consecutive titles.

McKinney has since focused on the development of carbon fiber-wrapped arrows.

In 2012, McKinney served as analyst for NBC's archery coverage at the Summer Olympics in London, and again served as archery analyst for NBC in the 2016 Summer Olympics in Rio.
