= Archery at the 2010 Asian Games – Men's team =

Men's team recurve at the 2010 Asian Games
- Venue: Aoti Archery Range
- Dates: 20–22 November 2010
- Competitors: 59 from 16 nations

Medalists
gold medal	South Korea; Im Dong-hyun, Kim Woo-jin, Oh Jin-hyek
silver medal	China; Chen Wenyuan, Dai Xiaoxiang, Xing Yu
bronze medal	India; Rahul Banerjee, Mangal Singh Champia, Jayanta Talukdar

The men's team recurve archery competition at the 2010 Asian Games in Guangzhou was held from 20 November to 22 November at Aoti Archery Range.

Each team consisted of the highest ranked three athletes from the qualification round.

== Schedule ==
All times are China Standard Time (UTC+08:00)

Date	Time	Event
Saturday, 20 November 2010	09:00	Qualification round
Monday, 22 November 2010	09:00	1/8 eliminations
Monday, 22 November 2010	09:40	1/4 eliminations
Monday, 22 November 2010	14:30	Semifinals
Monday, 22 November 2010	15:18	Bronze medal match
Monday, 22 November 2010	15:42	Gold medal match

== Results ==
=== Qualification round ===
Rank	Team	Distance				Total	10s	Xs
Rank	Team	90m	70m	50m	30m	Total	10s	Xs
1	South Korea (KOR)	982	1027	1029	1076	4114	243	95
	Im Dong-hyun	331	333	339	358	1361	80	32
	Kim Woo-jin	333	349	345	360	1387	74	23
	Lee Chang-hwan	~~328~~	~~336~~	~~342~~	~~349~~	~~1355~~	~~73~~	~~39~~
	Oh Jin-hyek	318	345	345	358	1366	89	40
2	China (CHN)	948	1001	1014	1063	4026	215	106
	Chen Wenyuan	315	333	342	358	1348	83	41
	Dai Xiaoxiang	315	330	334	351	1330	60	27
	Zhao Shenzhou	~~306~~	~~325~~	~~328~~	~~348~~	~~1307~~	~~55~~	~~24~~
	Xing Yu	318	338	338	354	1348	72	38
3	Japan (JPN)	937	993	1006	1067	4003	204	71
	Ryota Amano	312	329	333	357	1331	66	20
	Takaharu Furukawa	314	337	341	356	1348	79	30
	Hideki Kikuchi	311	327	332	354	1324	59	21
	Masashi Miyahara	~~291~~	~~316~~	~~316~~	~~347~~	~~1270~~	~~44~~	~~16~~
4	India (IND)	937	986	1016	1057	3996	204	72
	Rahul Banerjee	317	329	337	352	1335	67	26
	Mangal Singh Champia	307	333	338	353	1331	73	24
	Tarundeep Rai	~~314~~	~~330~~	~~335~~	~~353~~	~~1332~~	~~66~~	~~25~~
	Jayanta Talukdar	313	324	341	352	1330	64	22
5	Iran (IRI)	919	973	998	1056	3946	186	71
	Hamed Fouri	~~288~~	~~320~~	~~315~~	~~354~~	~~1277~~	~~51~~	~~22~~
	Nader Manouchehri	296	326	333	347	1302	54	25
	Keivan Riazimehr	308	325	334	354	1321	67	23
	Milad Vaziri	315	322	331	355	1323	65	23
6	Chinese Taipei (TPE)	909	992	993	1036	3930	193	76
	Chen Szu-yuan	~~308~~	~~335~~	~~331~~	~~350~~	~~1324~~	~~66~~	~~26~~
	Kuo Cheng-wei	310	329	339	351	1329	67	28
	Sung Chia-chun	305	332	334	353	1324	68	32
	Tien Kang	294	331	320	332	1277	58	16
7	Malaysia (MAS)	884	968	980	1037	3869	156	52
	Izzudin Abdul Rahim	302	327	332	344	1305	58	22
	Cheng Chu Sian	310	331	333	351	1325	60	23
	Arif Farhan	272	310	315	342	1239	38	7
	Wan Khalmizam	~~289~~	~~309~~	~~309~~	~~342~~	~~1249~~	~~38~~	~~18~~
8	Mongolia (MGL)	914	945	962	1036	3857	130	34
	Baasanjavyn Dolgorsüren	~~295~~	~~318~~	~~322~~	~~340~~	~~1275~~	~~46~~	~~19~~
	Gombodorjiin Gan-Erdene	314	321	329	349	1313	54	14
	Jantsangiin Gantögs	307	319	326	348	1300	41	10
	Baatarjavyn Zolboo	293	305	307	339	1244	35	10
9	Thailand (THA)	904	945	967	1032	3848	112	38
	Khomkrit Duangsuwan	304	323	320	340	1287	36	11
	Witthaya Thamwong	305	321	323	351	1300	49	19
	Denchai Thepna	295	301	324	341	1261	27	8
	Wachiranarong Tinrasri	~~287~~	~~309~~	~~308~~	~~334~~	~~1238~~	~~41~~	~~12~~
10	Myanmar (MYA)	874	941	962	1034	3811	141	50
	Nay Myo Aung	272	298	313	342	1225	40	18
	Yan Aung Soe	296	324	323	348	1291	52	17
	Zaw Win Htike	306	319	326	344	1295	49	15
11	Kazakhstan (KAZ)	868	931	955	1039	3793	125	50
	Artyom Gankin	291	291	306	344	1232	31	10
	Konstantin Kim	283	324	323	346	1276	49	19
	Oibek Saidiyev	294	316	326	349	1285	45	21
12	Nepal (NEP)	869	933	960	1028	3790	129	48
	Ramesh Bhattachan	271	310	318	338	1237	40	20
	Jit Bahadur Muktan	301	309	321	342	1273	45	15
	Prem Prasad Pun	~~241~~	~~261~~	~~281~~	~~311~~	~~1094~~	~~29~~	~~5~~
	Ashim Sherchan	297	314	321	348	1280	44	13
13	Bangladesh (BAN)	851	935	942	1024	3752	100	34
	Emdadul Haque Milon	287	322	320	346	1275	49	17
	Shiek Sojeb	275	306	323	346	1250	42	15
	Ziaul Hoq Zia	289	307	299	332	1227	9	2
14	Vietnam (VIE)	806	909	922	1015	3652	106	28
	Đào Trọng Kiên	287	323	318	346	1274	45	7
	Hoàng Ngọc Nhật	265	303	301	331	1200	32	15
	Vũ Văn Dũng	254	283	303	338	1178	29	6
15	Sri Lanka (SRI)	813	922	893	1005	3633	88	31
	Indranath Perera	272	298	307	343	1220	36	16
	Lakmal Rajasinghe	269	312	296	331	1208	21	4
	Nipun Senevirathne	272	312	290	331	1205	31	11
16	Qatar (QAT)	761	852	865	990	3468	75	20
	Israf Khan	249	274	288	333	1144	23	4
	Farhan Monser	~~206~~	~~298~~	~~268~~	~~318~~	~~1090~~	~~20~~	~~8~~
	Khadher Monser	265	278	270	324	1137	21	4
	Ali Ahmed Salem	247	300	307	333	1187	31	12

=== Knockout round ===
1/8 eliminations
1	South Korea	226
16	Qatar	196
9	Thailand	214
8	Mongolia	212
5	Iran	200
12	Nepal	207
13	Bangladesh	186
4	India	221
3	Japan	226
14	Vietnam	199
11	Kazakhstan	214^{42}
6	Chinese Taipei	214^{56}
7	Malaysia	217
10	Myanmar	207
15	Sri Lanka	201
2	China	221

1/4 eliminations
1	South Korea	229
9	Thailand	208
12	Nepal	194
4	India	221
3	Japan	218
6	Chinese Taipei	222
7	Malaysia	220
2	China	224

Semifinals
1	South Korea	222
4	India	216
6	Chinese Taipei	214
2	China	221

Gold medal match
1	South Korea	222
2	China	218
Bronze medal match
4	India	220
6	Chinese Taipei	216
