= 1999 Asian Archery Championships =

International archery tournament

- Host city: Beijing, China
- Dates: 1–6 September 1999

The 1999 Asian Archery Championships was the 11th edition of the event. It was held in Beijing, China from 1 to 6 September 1999 and was organized by Asian Archery Federation.

== Medal summary ==
| Event | Gold | Silver | Bronze |
|---|---|---|---|
| Men's individual | Chung Jae-hun; South Korea | Han Seung-hoon; South Korea | Hwang Jin-woo; South Korea |
| Men's team | South Korea; Chung Jae-hun; Han Seung-hoon; Hwang Jin-woo | China; Fu Shengjun; Tang Hua; Yang Bo | Chinese Taipei; Chang Chia-pin; Chiu Po-han; Wu Tsung-yi |
| Women's individual | Kang Hyun-ji; South Korea | Kim Du-ri; South Korea | Lee Hee-jung; South Korea |
| Women's team | South Korea; Kim Du-ri; Lee Hee-jung; Na Young-ha | Japan; Yukari Kawasaki; Sayoko Kitabatake; Miyuki Kuramoto | China; He Ying; Zhang Lili; Zhang Xiaoying |

== Medal table ==
| Rank | Nation | Gold | Silver | Bronze | Total |
|---|---|---|---|---|---|
| 1 | South Korea | 4 | 2 | 2 | 8 |
| 2 | China | 0 | 1 | 1 | 2 |
| 3 | Japan | 0 | 1 | 0 | 1 |
| 4 | Chinese Taipei | 0 | 0 | 1 | 1 |
| Totals (4 entries) | | 4 | 4 | 4 | 12 |
