= Archery at the 1994 Asian Games =

- Venue: Senogawa Park
- Dates: 6–10 October 1994
- Competitors: 67 from 13 nations

Archery was contested from October 6 to October 10 at the 1994 Asian Games in Senogawa Park, Hiroshima, Japan. The competition included only recurve events.

A total of 67 archers from 13 nations competed at the 1994 Asian Games, South Korea dominated the competition winning three out of four gold medals.

== Medalists ==
Event	Gold	Silver	Bronze
Men's individual	Park Kyung-mo; South Korea	Chung Jae-hun; South Korea	Wu Tsung-yi; Chinese Taipei
Men's team	South Korea; Chung Jae-hun; Oh Kyo-moon; Park Kyung-mo	Japan; Takayoshi Matsushita; Sadamu Nishikawa; Hiroshi Yamamoto	Kazakhstan; Vadim Shikarev; Vitaliy Shin; Vladimir Yesheyev
Women's individual	Lee Eun-kyung; South Korea	Lim Jung-ah; South Korea	Han Hee-jeong; South Korea
Women's team	China; He Ying; Lin Sang; Wang Xiaozhu	Indonesia; Danahuri Dahliana; Rusena Gelanteh; Purnama Pandiangan	South Korea; Han Hee-jeong; Lee Eun-kyung; Lim Jung-ah

== Medal table ==
Rank	Nation	Gold	Silver	Bronze	Total
1	South Korea (KOR)	3	2	2	7
2	China (CHN)	1	0	0	1
3	Indonesia (INA)	0	1	0	1
3	Japan (JPN)	0	1	0	1
5	Chinese Taipei (TPE)	0	0	1	1
5	Kazakhstan (KAZ)	0	0	1	1
Totals (6 entries)		4	4	4	12

== Participating nations ==
A total of 67 athletes from 13 nations competed in archery at the 1994 Asian Games:

- Bhutan (3)
- China (8)
- Chinese Taipei (8)
- India (6)
- Indonesia (3)
- Japan (8)
- Kazakhstan (7)
- Mongolia (7)
- Philippines (3)
- Tajikistan (1)
- Thailand (4)
- Turkmenistan (1)
- South Korea (8)
