= Archery at the 2006 Asian Games – Men's team =

Men's team recurve at the 2006 Asian Games
- Venue: Lusail Archery Range
- Dates: 9–13 December 2006
- Competitors: 52 from 13 nations

Medalists
| gold medal | South Korea; Im Dong-hyun, Jang Yong-ho, Lee Chang-hwan, Park Kyung-mo |
| silver medal | Chinese Taipei; Chen Szu-yuan, Hsu Tzu-yi, Kuo Cheng-wei, Wang Cheng-pang |
| bronze medal | India; Mangal Singh Champia, Tarundeep Rai, Jayanta Talukdar, Vishwas |

The men's team recurve competition at the 2006 Asian Games in Doha, Qatar was held from 9 to 13 December at the Lusail Archery Range.

== Schedule ==
All times are Arabia Standard Time (UTC+03:00)

| Date | Time | Event |
|---|---|---|
| Saturday, 9 December 2006 | 13:30 | Qualification 90/70 m |
| Sunday, 10 December 2006 | 13:15 | Qualification 50/30 m |
| Wednesday, 13 December 2006 | 12:15 | 1/8 round |
| Wednesday, 13 December 2006 | 12:55 | Quarterfinals |
| Wednesday, 13 December 2006 | 13:35 | Semifinals |
| Wednesday, 13 December 2006 | 14:50 | Bronze medal match |
| Wednesday, 13 December 2006 | 15:30 | Final |

== Results ==
=== Qualification ===
| Rank | Team | Distance | | | | Total | 10s | Xs |
| Rank | Team | 90m | 70m | 50m | 30m | Total | 10s | Xs |
|---|---|---|---|---|---|---|---|---|
| 1 | South Korea (KOR) | 914 | 990 | 1010 | 1069 | 3983 | 217 | 96 |
| | Im Dong-hyun | 308 | 333 | 335 | 356 | 1332 | 72 | 28 |
| | Jang Yong-ho | 305 | 327 | 332 | 357 | 1321 | 67 | 32 |
| | Lee Chang-hwan | ~~286~~ | ~~330~~ | ~~340~~ | ~~356~~ | ~~1312~~ | ~~63~~ | ~~30~~ |
| | Park Kyung-mo | 301 | 330 | 343 | 356 | 1330 | 78 | 36 |
| 2 | Chinese Taipei (TPE) | 866 | 966 | 997 | 1046 | 3875 | 180 | 83 |
| | Chen Szu-yuan | 289 | 319 | 331 | 346 | 1285 | 55 | 23 |
| | Hsu Tzu-yi | ~~283~~ | ~~309~~ | ~~329~~ | ~~349~~ | ~~1270~~ | ~~53~~ | ~~22~~ |
| | Kuo Cheng-wei | 294 | 328 | 337 | 348 | 1307 | 61 | 33 |
| | Wang Cheng-pang | 283 | 319 | 329 | 352 | 1283 | 64 | 27 |
| 3 | India (IND) | 879 | 941 | 996 | 1057 | 3873 | 177 | 61 |
| | Mangal Singh Champia | 299 | 305 | 340 | 356 | 1300 | 64 | 20 |
| | Tarundeep Rai | 294 | 321 | 322 | 349 | 1286 | 56 | 19 |
| | Jayanta Talukdar | 286 | 315 | 334 | 352 | 1287 | 57 | 22 |
| | Vishwas | ~~267~~ | ~~314~~ | ~~332~~ | ~~349~~ | ~~1262~~ | ~~49~~ | ~~14~~ |
| 4 | China (CHN) | 878 | 969 | 976 | 1048 | 3871 | 167 | 67 |
| | Jing Xiangqing | ~~272~~ | ~~310~~ | ~~323~~ | ~~353~~ | ~~1258~~ | ~~52~~ | ~~18~~ |
| | Li Wenquan | 284 | 324 | 317 | 351 | 1276 | 51 | 22 |
| | Wang Gang | 287 | 322 | 330 | 346 | 1285 | 57 | 22 |
| | Yong Fujun | 307 | 323 | 329 | 351 | 1310 | 59 | 23 |
| 5 | Malaysia (MAS) | 846 | 942 | 980 | 1030 | 3798 | 148 | 65 |
| | Nazrin Aizad | ~~219~~ | ~~294~~ | ~~297~~ | ~~335~~ | ~~1145~~ | ~~32~~ | ~~8~~ |
| | Cheng Chu Sian | 297 | 317 | 338 | 351 | 1303 | 60 | 29 |
| | Wan Khalmizam | 267 | 307 | 319 | 338 | 1231 | 42 | 15 |
| | Marbawi Sulaiman | 282 | 318 | 323 | 341 | 1264 | 46 | 21 |
| 6 | Japan (JPN) | 844 | 929 | 962 | 1037 | 3772 | 129 | 54 |
| | Chiaki Hashimoto | ~~261~~ | ~~293~~ | ~~304~~ | ~~341~~ | ~~1199~~ | ~~35~~ | ~~12~~ |
| | Satoshi Kanemura | 273 | 294 | 305 | 344 | 1216 | 34 | 14 |
| | Ryuichi Moriya | 277 | 320 | 330 | 347 | 1274 | 49 | 26 |
| | Tomokazu Wakino | 294 | 315 | 327 | 346 | 1282 | 46 | 14 |
| 7 | Kazakhstan (KAZ) | 791 | 945 | 980 | 1046 | 3762 | 147 | 55 |
| | Sergey Khristich | 257 | 320 | 329 | 344 | 1250 | 50 | 23 |
| | Igor Kovalev | 274 | 313 | 325 | 351 | 1263 | 52 | 14 |
| | Dulat Medeuov | ~~243~~ | ~~291~~ | ~~316~~ | ~~339~~ | ~~1189~~ | ~~37~~ | ~~10~~ |
| | Oibek Saidiyev | 260 | 312 | 326 | 351 | 1249 | 45 | 18 |
| 8 | Philippines (PHI) | 785 | 935 | 983 | 1048 | 3751 | 138 | 58 |
| | Marvin Cordero | 277 | 316 | 330 | 349 | 1272 | 49 | 18 |
| | Christian Cubilla | ~~258~~ | ~~306~~ | ~~319~~ | ~~342~~ | ~~1225~~ | ~~34~~ | ~~13~~ |
| | Paul Dela Cruz | 246 | 310 | 324 | 351 | 1231 | 45 | 18 |
| | Mark Javier | 262 | 309 | 329 | 348 | 1248 | 44 | 22 |
| 9 | Qatar (QAT) | 740 | 874 | 944 | 1004 | 3562 | 102 | 29 |
| | Ahmed Al-Abadi | 252 | 291 | 307 | 331 | 1181 | 28 | 8 |
| | Israf Khan | ~~214~~ | ~~279~~ | ~~285~~ | ~~323~~ | ~~1101~~ | ~~19~~ | ~~9~~ |
| | Farhan Monser | 239 | 279 | 318 | 331 | 1167 | 33 | 9 |
| | Ali Ahmed Salem | 249 | 304 | 319 | 342 | 1214 | 41 | 12 |
| 10 | Bhutan (BHU) | 777 | 858 | 908 | 1014 | 3557 | 92 | 29 |
| | Chencho Dorji | 256 | 280 | 295 | 338 | 1169 | 24 | 9 |
| | Tashi Dorji | ~~199~~ | ~~250~~ | ~~293~~ | ~~328~~ | ~~1070~~ | ~~24~~ | ~~8~~ |
| | Rinchen Gyeltshen | 253 | 294 | 311 | 338 | 1196 | 34 | 11 |
| | Tashi Peljor | 268 | 284 | 302 | 338 | 1192 | 34 | 9 |
| 11 | Myanmar (MYA) | 737 | 860 | 910 | 1003 | 3510 | 99 | 35 |
| | Kyaw Chan Nyein | ~~197~~ | ~~273~~ | ~~297~~ | ~~337~~ | ~~1104~~ | ~~24~~ | ~~10~~ |
| | Kyaw Lin Tun | 250 | 281 | 301 | 328 | 1160 | 25 | 5 |
| | Myo Ko Ko | 234 | 289 | 284 | 339 | 1146 | 35 | 15 |
| | Zaw Win Htike | 253 | 290 | 325 | 336 | 1204 | 39 | 15 |
| 12 | Mongolia (MGL) | 715 | 854 | 885 | 1004 | 3458 | 82 | 23 |
| | Dambadondogiin Baatarjav | 228 | 297 | 303 | 339 | 1167 | 34 | 8 |
| | Tsogtyn Badamkhatan | 242 | 275 | 301 | 332 | 1150 | 24 | 8 |
| | Jantsangiin Gantögs | 245 | 282 | 281 | 333 | 1141 | 24 | 7 |
| | Byadrangiin Lkhagvasüren | ~~204~~ | ~~246~~ | ~~301~~ | ~~333~~ | ~~1084~~ | ~~29~~ | ~~11~~ |
| 13 | Hong Kong (HKG) | 669 | 805 | 907 | 1003 | 3384 | 81 | 32 |
| | Gary Chan | ~~204~~ | ~~248~~ | ~~251~~ | ~~308~~ | ~~1011~~ | ~~15~~ | ~~4~~ |
| | Chan Kam Shing | 228 | 272 | 304 | 341 | 1145 | 31 | 12 |
| | Patrick Ma | 228 | 277 | 292 | 332 | 1129 | 26 | 10 |
| | Muk Hau Tak | 213 | 256 | 311 | 330 | 1110 | 24 | 10 |

=== Knockout round ===
1/8 round
9 | Qatar | 192
8 | Philippines | 214
5 | Malaysia | 209
12 | Mongolia | 195
13 | Hong Kong | 200
4 | China | 219
11 | Myanmar | 195
6 | Japan | 220
7 | Kazakhstan | 214
10 | Bhutan | 195

Quarterfinals
1 | South Korea | 225
8 | Philippines | 215
5 | Malaysia | 218
4 | China | 215
3 | India | 219
6 | Japan | 206
7 | Kazakhstan | 214
2 | Chinese Taipei | 223

Semifinals
1 | South Korea | 224
5 | Malaysia | 216
3 | India | 210
2 | Chinese Taipei | 220

Final
1 | South Korea | 216
2 | Chinese Taipei | 211
Bronze medal match
5 | Malaysia | 207
3 | India | 211
