= 2009 World Archery Championships – Men's team recurve =

The men's team recurve competition at the 2009 World Archery Championships took place on 4–9 September 2009 in Ulsan, South Korea. 33 teams of 3 archers took part in the men's recurve qualification round on 4 September. The 16 teams with the highest cumulative totals qualified for the 4-round knockout round on 7 September which was drawn according to their qualification round scores. The semi-finals and finals then took place on 8 September.

Hosts Korea continued their dominance of the recurve competition, winning the final against France by two points.

== Seeds ==
Seedings were based on the combined total of the team members' qualification scores in the individual ranking rounds. The top 16 teams were assigned places in the draw depending on their overall ranking.

1. (South Korea) Im Dong-hyun / Lee Chang-hwan / Oh Jin-hyek (champions)
2. (France) Thomas Aubert / Romain Girouille / Jean-Charles Valladont (2nd place)
3. (India) Rahul Banerjee / Mangal Singh Champia / Jayanta Talukdar (quarterfinal)
4. (Chinese Taipei) Kuo Cheng-wei / Sung Chia-chun / Wang Cheng-pang (quarterfinal)
5. (Ukraine) Dmytro Hrachov / Markiyan Ivashko / Viktor Ruban (1st round)
6. (China) Chen Wenyuan / Xing Yu / Xue Haifeng (4th place)
7. (Mexico) David Marin Coello / Juan René Serrano / Eduardo Vélez (1st round)
8. (Russia) Bair Badenov / Alexey Borodin / Baljinima Tsyrempilov (quarterfinal)
9. (United Kingdom) Larry Godfrey / Simon Terry / Alan Wills (1st round)
10. (United States) Brady Ellison / Richard Johnson / Victor Wunderle (quarterfinal)
11. (Australia) Matthew Gray / Sky Kim / Michael Naray (1st round)
12. (Japan) Hideki Kikuchi / Hiroshi Yamamoto / Hiroyuki Yoshinaga (3rd place)
13. (Italy) Ilario Di Buo / Marco Galiazzo / Mauro Nespoli (1st round)
14. (Malaysia) Cheng Chu Sian / Wan Khalmizam / Mohd Zulkifli Tahil (1st round)
15. (Canada) John David Burnes / Crispin Duenas / Jason Lyon (1st round)
16. (Spain) Elias Cuesta / Andres Gomez / Daniel Morillo (1st round)

== Draw ==
1st round
1	South Korea	230
16	Spain	210
9	United Kingdom	216^{27}
8	Russia	216^{29}
5	Ukraine	208
12	Japan	211
13	Italy	216
4	Chinese Taipei	222
3	India	217
14	Malaysia	207
11	Australia	216^{29;27}
6	China	216^{29;30}
7	Mexico	213
10	United States	216
15	Canada	213
2	France	222

Quarterfinals
1	South Korea	222
8	Russia	214
12	Japan	222
4	Chinese Taipei	218
3	India	216
6	China	221
10	United States	220
2	Italy	225

Semifinals
1	South Korea	231
12	Japan	226
6	China	212
2	France	223

Finals
1	South Korea	222
2	France	220
Third place
12	Japan	214
6	China	212
