= Tomi Poikolainen =

Finnish archer (born 1961)

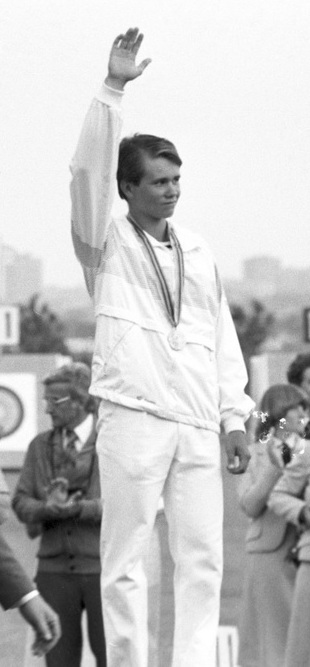
- Poikolainen at the 1980 Olympics

Personal information
- Born: 27 December 1961 (age 64) Helsinki, Finland
- Height: 178 cm (5 ft 10 in)
- Weight: 74–80 kg (163–176 lb)

Sport
- Sport: Archery
- Club: Amarco, Hyvinkää
- Coached by: Kyösti Laasonen
Medal record
Representing Finland
Olympic Games
Gold medal – first place	1980 Moscow	Individual
Silver medal – second place	1992 Barcelona	Team
World Archery Championships
Silver medal – second place	1981 Punta Ala	Team
Bronze medal – third place	1989 Lausanne	Individual
Silver medal – second place	1991 Krakow	Team
European Archery Championships
Silver medal – second place	1978 Stoneleigh	Team
Bronze medal – third place	1982 Kecskemét	Individual
Bronze medal – third place	1982 Kecskemét	Team
Gold medal – first place	1986 Izmir	Individual
Silver medal – second place	1986 Izmir	Team
Bronze medal – third place	1988 Luxembourg City	Individual
Bronze medal – third place	1988 Luxembourg City	Team
Gold medal – first place	1994 Nymburk	Team

Tomi Jaakko Poikolainen (born 27 December 1961) is a retired Finnish archer who competed in five consecutive Olympics from 1980 to 1996. He won an individual gold medal in 1980 and a team silver in 1992, placing fifth individually in 1984. Between 1978 and 1994 Poikolainen won 11 medals at European and world championships, including two European gold medals. His wife Jutta Poikolainen is also a retired Olympic archer.
