= 2005 World Archery Championships – Men's team recurve =

The men's team recurve competition at the 2005 World Archery Championships took place in June 2005 in Madrid, Spain. 143 archers took part in the men's recurve qualification round with no more than 4 from each country, and the 16 teams of 3 archers with the highest cumulative totals (out of a possible 31) qualified for the 4-round knockout round, drawn according to their qualification round scores.

== Seeds ==
Seedings were based on the combined total of the team members' qualification scores in the individual ranking rounds. The top 16 teams were assigned places in the draw depending on their overall ranking.

1. (South Korea) Park Kyung-mo / Chung Jae-hun / Choi Won-jong (champions)
2. (India) Tarundeep Rai / Gautam Singh / Jayanta Talukdar (2nd place)
3. (Chinese Taipei) Kuo Cheng-wei / Liu Ming-huang / Wang Cheng-pang (1st round)
4. (Italy) Michele Frangilli / Marco Galiazzo / Ilario di Buo (1st round)
5. (United Kingdom) Larry Godfrey / Alan Wills / Michael Peart (1st round)
6. (Australia) Matthew Gray / Tim Cuddihy / Christopher Madeley (1st round)
7. (Japan) Hiroshi Yamamoto / Ryuichi Moriya / Takaharu Furukawa (1st round)
8. (Russia) Baljinima Tsyrempilov / Erdem Zhigzhitov / Alexey Nikolaev (1st round)
9. (Netherlands) Wietse van Alten / Pieter Custers / Henk Vogels (quarterfinal)
10. (United States) Richard Johnson / Victor Wunderle / Joseph McGlyn (quarterfinal)
11. (Malaysia) Muhammad Marbawi Sulaiman / Wan Khalmizam / Cheng Chu Sian (quarterfinal)
12. (Ukraine) Viktor Ruban / Oleksandr Serdyuk / Markiyan Ivashko (4th place)
13. (China) Wu Fengbo / Xue Haifeng / Yong Fujun (quarterfinal)
14. (Poland) Piotr Piątek / Jacek Proć / Grzegorz Sliwka (3rd place)
15. (Germany) Sebastian Rohrberg / Jens Pieper / Michael Frankenberg (1st round)
16. (Belarus) Anton Prilepau / Siarhei Vitorski / Mikalai Marusau (1st round)

== Draw ==
1st round
1	South Korea	251
16	Belarus	247
9	Netherlands	238*
8	Russia	238
5	United Kingdom	246
12	Ukraine	250
13	China	246
4	Italy	242
3	Chinese Taipei	237
14	Poland	238
11	Malaysia	244
6	Australia	242
7	Japan	245
10	United States	252
15	Germany	241
2	India	252

Quarterfinals
1	South Korea	248
9	Netherlands	233
12	Ukraine	240
13	China	239
14	Poland	248
11	Malaysia	240
10	United States	236
2	India	255

Semifinals
1	South Korea	252
12	Ukraine	244
14	Poland	233
2	India	246

Finals
1	South Korea	244
2	India	232
Third place
12	Ukraine	239
14	Poland	241
