= Archery at the 1990 Asian Games =

- Venue: Beijing Shooting Range Field
- Dates: 1–6 October 1990

Archery was contested from October 1 to October 6 at the 1990 Asian Games in Beijing, China. The competition included only recurve events and took place at the Beijing Shooting Range Field.

South Korea dominated the competition, winning all possible four gold medals.

== Medalists ==
| Event | Gold | Silver | Bronze |
|---|---|---|---|
| Men's individual | Yang Chang-hoon; South Korea | Takayoshi Matsushita; Japan | Kim Sun-bin; South Korea |
| Men's team | South Korea; Kim Sun-bin; Park Jae-pyo; Yang Chang-hoon | Japan; Takayoshi Matsushita; Sadamu Nishikawa; Hiroshi Yamamoto | Chinese Taipei; Chiu Ping-kun; Tseng Cheng-jen; Tu Chih-chen |
| Women's individual | Lee Jang-mi; South Korea | Lee Eun-kyung; South Korea | Kim Soo-nyung; South Korea |
| Women's team | South Korea; Kim Soo-nyung; Lee Eun-kyung; Lee Jang-mi | Chinese Taipei; Chin Chiu-yueh; Lai Fang-mei; Liu Pi-yu | North Korea; Kim Jong-hwa; Kim Ok-hui; Ri Myong-gum |

== Medal table ==
| Rank | Nation | Gold | Silver | Bronze | Total |
|---|---|---|---|---|---|
| 1 | South Korea (KOR) | 4 | 1 | 2 | 7 |
| 2 | Japan (JPN) | 0 | 2 | 0 | 2 |
| 3 | Chinese Taipei (TPE) | 0 | 1 | 1 | 2 |
| 4 | North Korea (PRK) | 0 | 0 | 1 | 1 |
| Totals (4 entries) | | 4 | 4 | 4 | 12 |
