= 1977 World Archery Championships =

- Location: Canberra, Australia
- Start date: 8 February
- End date: 11 February
- Competitors: 109

The 1977 World Archery Championships was the 29th edition of the event. It was held in Canberra, Australia on 8–11 February 1977 and was organised by World Archery Federation (FITA).

== Medals summary ==
=== Recurve ===
Event	Gold	Silver	Bronze
Men's individual	Richard McKinney; United States	Takashi Kamei; Japan	Leandro De Nardi; Italy
Women's individual	Luann Ryon; United States	Jadwiga Wilejto; Poland	Irene Daubenspeck; United States
Men's team	United States; Darrell Pace; Richard McKinney; Edwin Murray Eliason	Italy; Leandro De Nardi; Giancarlo Ferrari; Sante Spigarelli	Japan; Takashi Kamei; Takayoshi Matsushita; Hiroshi Michinaga
Women's team	United States; Luann Ryon; Irene Daubenspeck; Ruth Rowe	Soviet Union; Zebiniso Rustamova; Lhamo Bubeevna Dashirabdanova; Olga Rulenko	Australia; Carole Mary Toy; Maureen Adams; Shirley Vera Chessher

== Medals table ==
Rank	Nation	Gold	Silver	Bronze	Total
1	United States	4	0	1	5
2	Italy	0	1	1	2
2	Japan	0	1	1	2
4	Poland	0	1	0	1
4	Soviet Union	0	1	0	1
6	Australia	0	0	1	1
Totals (6 entries)		4	4	4	12
