= Irina Soldatova =

Russian archer

Medal record

Women's Archery

Representing Soviet Union

World Championships
Gold medal – first place	1985 Seoul	Individual
Gold medal – first place	1985 Seoul	Team

Irina Soldatova (Cyrillic:Ирина Солдатова; 1965 in Cheboksary, Chuvash Republic, USSR – 2002) was a female Russian archer. She was a Soviet Union national champion, and the 1985 World Champion.

== Career ==
In later life she became an archery coach, and following her early death both the sports school she attended and an annual national championship are named in her honour.
