= 2007 World Archery Championships – Men's team recurve =

The men's team recurve competition at the 2007 World Archery Championships took place from July 2007 in Leipzig, Germany. 50 teams of 3 archers took part in the men's recurve qualification round, and the 16 teams with the highest cumulative totals qualified for the 4-round knockout round, drawn according to their qualification round scores. The semi-finals and finals then took place on 14 July.

South Korea set a 24 arrow men's team world record in the semi-finals with 231, beating the previous record by China of 229, in 2006.

== Seeds ==
Seedings were based on the combined total of the team members' qualification scores in the individual ranking rounds. The top 16 teams were assigned places in the draw depending on their overall ranking.

1. (South Korea) Im Dong-hyun / Kim Yeon-chul / Lee Chang-hwan (champions)
2. (United Kingdom) Larry Godfrey / Simon Terry / Alan Wills (2nd place)
3. (Italy) Ilario di Buo / Michele Frangilli / Marco Galiazzo (quarterfinal)
4. (Chinese Taipei) Kuo Cheng-wei / Liu Ming-huang / Wang Cheng-pang (3rd place)
5. (China) Jiang Lin / Xue Haifeng / Yong Fujun (1st round)
6. (Australia) David Barnes / Sky Kim / Michael Naray (1st round)
7. (Japan) Ryota Amano / Takaharu Furukawa / Ryuichi Moriya (1st round)
8. (Mexico) Jorge Pablo Chapoy / Juan René Serrano / Eduardo Vélez (1st round)
9. (Canada) Crispin Duenas / Jason Lyon / Hugh MacDonald (quarterfinal)
10. (United States) Brady Ellison / Richard Johnson / Victor Wunderle (quarterfinal)
11. (Poland) Rafał Dobrowolski / Piotr Piątek / Jacek Proć (4th place)
12. (Ukraine) Pavlo Bekker / Markiyan Ivashko / Viktor Ruban (quarterfinal)
13. (Malaysia) Cheng Chu Sian / Muhammad Marbawi Sulaiman / Wan Khalmizam (1st round)
14. (India) Rahul Banerjee / Somai Murmu / Tarundeep Rai (1st round)
15. (Sweden) Goran Bjerendal / Stefan Nilsson / Magnus Petersson (1st round)
16. (Russia) Bair Badenov / Ilia Sidorin / Baljinima Tsyrempilov (1st round)

== Draw ==
1st round
1	South Korea	228
16	Russia	209
9	Canada	220
8	Mexico	207
5	China	204
12	Ukraine	211
13	Malaysia	206
4	Chinese Taipei	212
3	Italy	212^{26}
14	India	212^{25}
11	Poland	210
6	Australia	207
7	Japan	213
10	United States	218
15	Sweden	200
2	United Kingdom	222

Quarterfinals
1	South Korea	212
9	Canada	207
12	Ukraine	211
4	'Chinese Taipei'	213
3	Italy	218
11	Poland	220
10	United States	216
2	United Kingdom	221

Semifinals
1	South Korea	231
4	Chinese Taipei	220
11	Poland	211
2	United Kingdom	216

Finals
1	South Korea	224
2	United Kingdom	214
Third place
4	Chinese Taipei	218
11	Poland	215
