= Natalya Butuzova =

Soviet archer (born 1954)

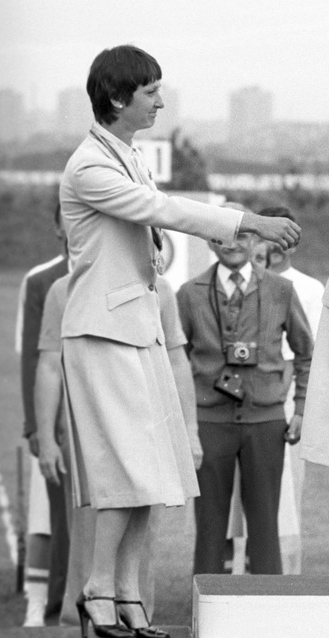
- Butuzova at the 1980 Olympics

Personal information
- Born: 17 February 1954 (age 72)
- Height: 167 cm (5 ft 6 in)
- Weight: 58 kg (128 lb)

Sport
- Sport: Archery
- Club: VS Toshkent
Medal record
Representing Soviet Union
Olympic Games
Silver medal – second place	1980 Moscow	Individual
World Archery Championships
Gold medal – first place	1981 Punta Ala	Individual
Gold medal – first place	1981 Punta Ala	Team
European Archery Championships
Gold medal – first place	1980 Compiègne	Individual, outdoor
Gold medal – first place	1980 Compiègne	Team, outdoor
Gold medal – first place	1981	Individual, indoor
Gold medal – first place	1981	Team, indoor
Gold medal – first place	1982 Kecskemét	Individual, outdoor
Gold medal – first place	1982 Kecskemét	Team, outdoor
Gold medal – first place	1988 Luxembourg City	Team, outdoor

Natalya Anatolyevna Butuzova (Russian: Наталья Анатольевна Бутузова, born 17 February 1954) is a retired archer from Uzbekistan. She competed for the Soviet Union at the 1980 and 1988 Olympics and won an individual silver medal in 1980. She won the individual and team world and European titles in 1980–1982.

== Career ==
Domestically Butuzova won five Soviet individual titles in 1979–1983. After retiring from competitions she worked as an archery coach in Uzbekistan and Germany.
