= Stanislav Zabrodsky =

Soviet archer (born 1962)

Medal record

Men's archery

Representing Soviet Union

World Championships
Gold medal – first place	1989 Lausannne	Individual
Gold medal – first place	1989 Lausannne	Team
Bronze medal – third place	1981 Punta Ala	Team

Representing Ukraine

World Championships
Bronze medal – third place	1993 Antalya	Individual

World Indoor Championships
Bronze medal – third place	1993 Perpignan	Individual

European Championships

Representing Soviet Union
Gold medal – first place	1988 Luxembourg	Team
Gold medal – first place	1990 Barcelona	Team

Representing CIS
Gold medal – first place	1992 Valletta	Team
Silver medal – second place	1992 Valletta	Individual

European Indoor Championships

Representing Soviet Union
Gold medal – first place	1989 Athens	Team

Representing Ukraine
Bronze medal – third place	1996 Mol	Team

Representing Kazakhstan

Asian Games
Bronze medal – third place	2002 Busan	Team

Stanislav Vyacheslavovich Zabrodskiy (Ukrainian: Станіслав В'ячеславович Забродський; born 1 January 1962 in Kharkiv, Ukrainian SSR, Soviet Union) is a retired archer. Zabrodsky represented three countries (Unified Team, Ukraine and Kazakhstan) at four Summer Olympics in 1992, 1996, 2000 and 2004. He also represented the Soviet Union at pre-1992 tournaments, including at the 1989 World Archery Championships, where he won two gold medals and broke four world records.
