= 2003 World Archery Championships – Men's team recurve =

The men's team recurve competition at the 2003 World Archery Championships took place in July 2003 in New York City, United States. 174 archers took part in the men's recurve qualification round with no more than 4 from each country, and the 16 teams of 3 archers with the highest cumulative totals (out of a possible 37) qualified for the 4-round knockout round, drawn according to their qualification round scores.

== Seeds ==
Seedings were based on the combined total of the team members' qualification scores in the individual ranking rounds. The top 16 teams were assigned places in the draw depending on their overall ranking.

1. (South Korea) Jang Yong-ho / Choi Young-kwang / Im Dong-hyun (champions)
2. (Italy) Marco Galiazzo / Michele Frangilli / Ilario di Buo (3rd place)
3. (Australia) David Barnes / Matthew Gray / Tim Cuddihy (1st round)
4. (Russia) Baljinima Tsyrempilov / Bair Badenov / Yuri Leontiev (1st round)
5. (Ukraine) Oleksandr Serdyuk / Viktor Ruban / Igor Parkhomenko (quarterfinal)
6. (Chinese Taipei) Wang Cheng-pang / Chen Szu-yuan / Hsu Tzu-yi (quarterfinal)
7. (United States) Victor Wunderle / Butch Johnson / Glenn L. Meyers (quarterfinal)
8. (Japan) Yuji Hamano / Takaharu Furukawa / Hiroshi Yamamoto (1st round)
9. (Netherlands) Pieter Custers / Wietse van Alten / Ron van der Hoff (quarterfinal)
10. (China) Xue Haifeng / Jiang Lin / Chen Hongyuan (1st round)
11. (Denmark) Hasse Pavia Lind / Dennis Bager / Morten Caspersen (1st round)
12. (France) Jocelyn de Grandis / Franck Fisseux / Lionel Torres (1st round)
13. (India) Satyadev Prasad / Acharya Ved Kumar / Tarundeep Rai (4th place)
14. (Sweden) Magnus Petersson / Mattias Eriksson / Mikael Larsson (2nd place)
15. (Poland) Jacek Proć / Piotr Piątek / Zbigniew Stanieczek (1st round)
16. (Germany) Alexander Froese / Michael Frankenberg / Jens Pieper (1st round)

== Draw ==
1st round
1	South Korea	257
16	Germany	245
9	Netherlands	244
8	Japan	240
5	Ukraine	244
12	France	239
13	India	249
4	Russia	242
3	Australia	238
14	Sweden	244
11	Denmark	238
6	Chinese Taipei	240
7	United States	244
10	China	240
15	Poland	237
2	Italy	254

Quarterfinals
1	South Korea	249
9	Netherlands	242
5	Ukraine	232
13	India	247
14	Sweden	249
6	Chinese Taipei	240
7	United States	247
2	Italy	249

Semifinals
1	South Korea	242
13	India	238
14	Sweden	242
2	Italy	241

Finals
1	South Korea	238
14	Sweden	234
Third place
13	India	244
2	Italy	252
