= Kim Soo-nyung =

South Korean archer (born 1971)

Medal record

Women's archery

Representing South Korea

Olympic Games
Gold medal – first place	1988 Seoul	Individual
Gold medal – first place	1988 Seoul	Team
Gold medal – first place	1992 Barcelona	Team
Gold medal – first place	2000 Sydney	Team
Silver medal – second place	1992 Barcelona	Individual
Bronze medal – third place	2000 Sydney	Individual

World Championships
Gold medal – first place	1989 Lausanne	Individual
Gold medal – first place	1989 Lausanne	Team
Gold medal – first place	1991 Krakow	Individual
Gold medal – first place	1991 Krakow	Team

Asian Games
Gold medal – first place	1990 Beijing	Team
Bronze medal – third place	1990 Beijing	Individual

- Kim Soo-nyung
- Hangul: 김수녕
- Hanja: 金秀寧
- RR: Gim Sunyeong
- MR: Kim Sunyŏng

Kim Soo-nyung (born April 5, 1971, in Chungcheongbuk-do) is a former member of the South Korean Olympic archery team in 1988, 1992, and 2000.

== Career ==
She has earned a total of four gold medals at the Olympics, one for the individual event in 1988 and three for the team event in 1988, 1992 and 2000. She won a further silver medal in 1992 and a bronze in 2000, both for the individual events. She retired after the 1992 Olympics to marry and raise two children, resuming her training in 1999, in the lead up to the 2000 Summer Olympics.

She competed at the 1990 Asian Games winning a gold medal in the team event and a bronze in the individual. She also won two consecutive individual and team world championships in 1989 and 1991.

In 2011, Kim was declared the Female Archer of the 20th Century by the International Archery Federation (FITA).

== See also ==
- List of South Korean archers
