= Kim Jin-ho (archer) =

South Korean archer (born 1961)

Medal record

Representing South Korea

Women's archery

Olympic Games
Bronze medal – third place	1984 Los Angeles	Individual

World Championships
Gold medal – first place	1979 Berlin	Individual
Gold medal – first place	1979 Berlin	Team
Gold medal – first place	1983 Los Angeles	Individual
Gold medal – first place	1983 Los Angeles	Team
Silver medal – second place	1981 Punta Ala	Team
Silver medal – second place	1985 Seoul	Team
Bronze medal – third place	1985 Seoul	Individual

Asian Games
Gold medal – first place	1978 Bangkok	Individual
Gold medal – first place	1982 New Delhi	Team
Gold medal – first place	1986 Seoul	Individual 30m
Gold medal – first place	1986 Seoul	Individual 60m
Gold medal – first place	1986 Seoul	Team
Silver medal – second place	1978 Bangkok	Team
Silver medal – second place	1982 New Delhi	Individual
Silver medal – second place	1986 Seoul	Individual
Silver medal – second place	1986 Seoul	Individual 70m

- Kim Jin-ho
- Hangul: 김진호
- Hanja: 金珍浩
- RR: Gim Jinho
- MR: Kim Chinho

Kim Jin-ho (born December 1, 1961) is a South Korean archer and Olympic medalist.

== Career ==
She competed at the 1984 Summer Olympics in Los Angeles, where she won an individual bronze medal.

She competed in the Asian Games in 1978 winning a gold medal in the individual event and a silver in the team event; in 1982 winning a gold medal in the team event and silver in the individual; and in 1986 winning gold medals in the team and individual 30m and 60m events and silver medals in the individual and individual 70m events.

She currently teaches at the Korea National Sport University.
