= 1985 World Archery Championships =

- Location: Seoul, South Korea
- Start date: 1 October
- End date: 5 October

The 1985 World Archery Championships was the 33rd edition of the event. It was held in Seoul, South Korea on 1–5 October 1985 and was organised by World Archery Federation (FITA).

In this competition, the Korean men's team broke the United States' 26-year reign as champions.

== Medals summary ==
=== Recurve ===
Event	Gold	Silver	Bronze
Men's individual	Richard McKinney; United States	Koo Ja-chong; South Korea	Takayoshi Matsushita; Japan
Women's individual	Irina Soldatova; Soviet Union	Lyudmila Arzhannikova; Soviet Union	Kim Jin-ho; South Korea
Men's team	South Korea	United States	Sweden
Women's team	Soviet Union	South Korea	West Germany

== Medals table ==
Rank	Nation	Gold	Silver	Bronze	Total
1	Soviet Union	2	1	0	3
2	South Korea	1	2	1	4
3	United States	1	1	0	2
4	Japan	0	0	1	1
4	Sweden	0	0	1	1
4	West Germany	0	0	1	1
Totals (6 entries)		4	4	4	12
