= 2011 World Archery Championships – Men's team recurve =

The men's team recurve competition at the 2011 World Archery Championships took place on 5–10 July 2011 in Turin, Italy. 55 teams of three archers competed in the qualification round on 5 July; the top 16 teams qualified for the knockout tournament on 6 July, with the semi-finals and finals on 10 July. The tournament doubled as the principal qualification tournament for the 2012 Olympics.

Top seeds Korea, represented by Im Dong-hyun, Oh Jin-hyek, and individual champion Kim Woo-jin won the competition, defeating France in the final.

== Seeds ==
Seedings were based on the combined total of the team members' qualification scores in the individual ranking rounds. The top 16 teams were assigned places in the draw depending on their overall ranking.

1. (South Korea) Im Dong-hyun / Kim Woo-jin / Oh Jin-hyek (champions)
2. (Italy) Michele Frangilli / Marco Galiazzo / Mauro Nespoli (3rd place)
3. (France) Romain Girouille / Gaël Prévost / Jean-Charles Valladont (2nd place)
4. (United States) Brady Ellison / Joe Fanchin / Jacob Wukie (quarterfinal)
5. (Mexico) Juan René Serrano / Eduardo Vélez / Pedro Vivas Alcala (4th place)
6. (Ukraine) Dmytro Hrachov / Markiyan Ivashko / Viktor Ruban (quarterfinal)
7. (China) Chen Wenyuan / Dai Xiaoxiang / Xing Yu (quarterfinal)
8. (United Kingdom) Larry Godfrey / Simon Terry / Alan Wills (quarterfinal)
9. (Chinese Taipei) Kuo Cheng-wei / Tien Kang / Wang Cheng-pang (1st round)
10. (India) Rahul Banerjee / Tarundeep Rai / Jayanta Talukdar (1st round)
11. (Canada) Crispin Duenas / Jason Lyon / Patrick Rivest-Bunster (1st round)
12. (Russia) Bair Badenov / Alexey Belov / Alexander Kozhin (1st round)
13. (Poland) Piotr Nowak / Piotr Piątek / Jacek Proć (1st round)
14. (Malaysia) Cheng Chu Sian / Haziq Kamaruddin / Khairul Anuar Mohamad (1st round)
15. (Germany) Florian Floto / Jens Pieper / Sebastian Rohrberg (1st round)
16. (Japan) Takaharu Furukawa / Hideki Kikuchi / Hiroki Suetake (1st round)

== Draw ==
1st round
1	South Korea	223
16	Japan	210
9	Chinese Taipei	212
8	United Kingdom	213
5	Mexico	213
12	Russia	209
13	Poland	215
4	United States	223
3	France	216^{27}
14	Malaysia	216^{26}
11	Canada	213
6	Ukraine	217
7	China	216
10	India	215
15	Germany	149
2	Italy	219

Quarterfinals
1	South Korea	224
8	United Kingdom	219
5	Mexico	218
4	United States	217
3	France	222
6	Ukraine	221
7	China	219
2	Italy	221

Semifinals
1	South Korea	230
5	Mexico	220
3	France	222
2	Italy	219

Finals
1	South Korea	226
3	France	217
Third place
5	Mexico	210
2	Italy	212
