= Kim Du-ri =

South Korean archer

Medal record

Women's archery

Representing South Korea

World Championships
Gold medal – first place	1997 Victoria	Individual

Kim Du-ri (Korean: 김두리) is a South Korean archer who won the 1997 World Championships in Victoria, British Columbia. She was also part of the team that won the gold medal at the 1999 Asian Championships, the event at which she additionally won individual silver.
