= 2011 World Archery Championships – Women's team recurve =

The women's team recurve competition at the 2011 World Archery Championships took place on 4–10 July 2011 in Torino, Italy. 41 teams of three archers competed in the qualification round on 4 July; the top 16 teams qualified for the knockout tournament on 6 July, with the semi-finals and finals on 10 July. The tournament doubled as the principal qualification tournament for the 2012 Olympics.

Third seeds Italy won the competition, defeating India in the final.

== Seeds ==
Seedings were based on the combined total of the team members' qualification scores in the individual ranking rounds. The top 16 teams were assigned places in the draw depending on their overall ranking.

1. (South Korea) Han Gyeong-hee / Jung Dasomi / Ki Bo-bae (3rd place)
2. (China) Fang Yuting / Xu Jing / Zhu Shanshan (4th place)
3. (Italy) Guendalina Sartori / Jessica Tomasi / Natalia Valeeva (champions)
4. (India) Bombayla Devi Laishram / Deepika Kumari / Chekrovolu Swuro (2nd place)
5. (United States) Miranda Leek / Khatuna Lorig / Jennifer Nichols (1st round)
6. (Chinese Taipei) Le Chien-ying / Lin Chia-en / Yuan Shu-chi (quarterfinal)
7. (United Kingdom) Naomi Folkard / Amy Oliver / Alison Williamson (1st round)
8. (Poland) Natalia Leśniak / Karina Lipiarska / Justyna Mospinek (1st round)
9. (Ukraine) Victoriya Koval / Nina Mylchenko / Lidiia Sichenikova (quarterfinal)
10. (Russia) Natalya Erdyniyeva / Ksenia Perova / Inna Stepanova (quarterfinal)
11. (Japan) Nami Hayakawa / Ren Hayakawa / Kaori Kawanaka (1st round)
12. (Denmark) Carina Christiansen / Maja Jager / Louise Laursen (quarterfinal)
13. (France) Celine Bezault / Cyrielle Delamare Cotry / Berengere Schuh (1st round)
14. (Georgia (country)) Asmat Diasamidze / Kristine Esebua / Khatuna Narimanidze (1st round)
15. (Mexico) Mariana Avitia / Aída Román / Alejandra Valencia (1st round)
16. (Germany) Elena Richter / Lisa Unruh / Karina Winter (1st round)

== Draw ==
1st round
1 | South Korea | 218
16 | Germany | 210
9 | Ukraine | 211^{27}
8 | Poland | 211^{26}
5 | United States | 210
12 | Denmark | 215
13 | France | 213
4 | India | 216
3 | Italy | 207^{25*}
14 | Georgia | 207^{25}
11 | Japan | 206
6 | Chinese Taipei | 222
7 | United Kingdom | 213
10 | Russia | 214
15 | Mexico | 203
2 | China | 217

Quarterfinals
1 | South Korea | 225
9 | Ukraine | 211
12 | Denmark | 197
4 | India | 203
3 | Italy | 219
6 | Chinese Taipei | 209
10 | Russia | 209
2 | China | 214

Semifinals
1 | South Korea | 212
4 | India | 216
3 | Italy | 221
2 | China | 213

Finals
2 | India | 207
1 | Italy | 210
Third place
3 | South Korea | 222
4 | China | 214
