= Lee Kyung-chul =

South Korean archer

Medal record

Men's archery

Representing South Korea

World Championships
Gold medal – first place	1995 Jakarta	Individual
Gold medal – first place	1995 Jakarta	Team

Lee Kyung-Chul (Korean: 이경철) is a South Korean archer who won the 1995 World Archery Championships in Jakarta.
