= 1997 Asian Archery Championships =

International archery tournament

- Host city: Langkawi, Malaysia
- Dates: 21–24 November 1997

The 1997 Asian Archery Championships was the 10th edition of the event. It was held in Langkawi, Malaysia from 21 to 24 November 1997, and was organized by Asian Archery Federation.

== Medal summary ==
Event	Gold	Silver	Bronze
Men's individual	Oh Kyo-moon; South Korea	Hong Sung-chil; South Korea	Kim Bo-ram; South Korea
Men's team	Japan	South Korea	India
Women's individual	Yoon Hye-young; South Korea	He Ying; China	Kang Hyun-ji; South Korea
Women's team	South Korea	China	Japan

== Medal table ==
Rank	Nation	Gold	Silver	Bronze	Total
1	South Korea	3	2	2	7
2	Japan	1	0	1	2
3	China	0	2	0	2
4	India	0	0	1	1
Totals (4 entries)		4	4	4	12
