= Choi Won-tae (archer) =

South Korean archer (born 1967)

Personal information
- Nationality: South Korean
- Born: 11 November 1967 (age 58)

Sport
- Sport: Archery

Choi Won-tae (born 11 November 1967) is a South Korean archer, who competed in the men's individual event at the 1984 Summer Olympics.

He won the 70m competition at the 3rd President's Cup in 1976.
