= 2013 Asian Archery Championships =

International archery tournament

- Host city: Taipei, Taiwan
- Dates: 29 October – 2 November 2013

The 2013 Asian Archery Championships was the 18th edition of the event. It was held in Taipei, Taiwan from 29 October to 2 November 2013 and was organized by Asian Archery Federation.

== Medal summary ==
=== Recurve ===
Event	Gold	Silver	Bronze
Men's individual	Takaharu Furukawa; Japan	Jantsangiin Gantögs; Mongolia	Jung Sung-won; South Korea
Men's team	South Korea; Jin Jae-wang; Jung Sung-won; Ku Bon-chan	Japan; Takaharu Furukawa; Shohei Ota; Shungo Tabata	Chinese Taipei; Chang Wei-hsiang; Chu Shu-yu; Kuo Cheng-wei
Women's individual	Lei Chien-ying; Chinese Taipei	Jung Dasomi; South Korea	Bombayla Devi Laishram; India
Women's team	South Korea; Choi Mi-sun; Joo Hyun-jung; Jung Dasomi	Chinese Taipei; Lei Chien-ying; Lin Shih-chia; Tan Ya-ting	Japan; Yuki Hayashi; Ayano Kato; Kaori Kawanaka
Mixed team	India; Jayanta Talukdar; Deepika Kumari	South Korea; Ku Bon-chan; Choi Mi-sun	Chinese Taipei; Kuo Cheng-wei; Tan Ya-ting

=== Compound ===
Event	Gold	Silver	Bronze
Men's individual	Abhishek Verma; India	Sandeep Kumar; India	Chanchai Wong; Thailand
Men's team	India; Ratan Singh Khuraijam; Sandeep Kumar; Abhishek Verma	South Korea; Choi Yong-hee; Kim Jong-ho; Min Li-hong	Chinese Taipei; Chen Po-kai; Kung Lin-hsiang; Wang Chih-hao
Women's individual	Seok Ji-hyun; South Korea	Youn So-jung; South Korea	Choi Bo-min; South Korea
Women's team	Chinese Taipei; Chen Li-ju; Huang I-jou; Wen Ning-meng	Iran; Minoo Abedi; Sakineh Ghasempour; Shabnam Sarlak	South Korea; Choi Bo-min; Seok Ji-hyun; Youn So-jung
Mixed team	India; Abhishek Verma; Lily Chanu Paonam	Iran; Amir Kazempour; Minoo Abedi	Chinese Taipei; Kung Lin-hsiang; Wen Ning-meng

== Medal table ==
Rank	Nation	Gold	Silver	Bronze	Total
1	India	4	1	1	6
2	South Korea	3	4	3	10
3	Chinese Taipei	2	1	4	7
4	Japan	1	1	1	3
5	Iran	0	2	0	2
6	Mongolia	0	1	0	1
7	Thailand	0	0	1	1
Totals (7 entries)		10	10	10	30

== See also ==
- List of sporting events in Taiwan
