= 1979 World Archery Championships =

- Location: Berlin, West Germany
- Start date: 14 July
- End date: 22 July
- Competitors: 168

The 1979 World Archery Championships was the 30th edition of the event. It was held in Berlin, West Germany on 14–22 July 1979 and was organised by World Archery Federation (FITA).

The 1979 event marked the first Championship gold medals for South Korea, in the women's team and individual events, have since dominated World Archery Federation events until the present day.

== Medals summary ==
=== Recurve ===
Event	Gold	Silver	Bronze
Men's individual	Darrell Pace; United States	Richard McKinney; United States	Rodney Baston; United States
Women's individual	Kim Jin-ho; South Korea	Judi Adams; United States	Carole Mary Toy; Australia
Men's team	United States; Darrell Pace; Richard McKinney; Rodney Baston	West Germany; Harry Wittig; Armin Garnreiter; Willi Muller	Belgium; Patrick De Koning; Marnix Vervinck; Emiel Vercaigne
Women's team	South Korea; Park Young-sook; Kim Jin-ho; Hwang Sook-zoo	Australia; Carole Mary Toy; Terry Eva Donovan; Leah Margaret Feldt	United Kingdom; Sue Willcox; Rachel Fenwick; Joyce Asher

== Medals table ==
Rank	Nation	Gold	Silver	Bronze	Total
1	United States	2	2	1	5
2	South Korea	2	0	0	2
3	Australia	0	1	1	2
4	West Germany	0	1	0	1
5	Belgium	0	0	1	1
5	Great Britain	0	0	1	1
Totals (6 entries)		4	4	4	12
