= 1983 World Archery Championships =

- Location: Los Angeles, United States
- Start date: 19 October
- End date: 22 October
- Competitors: 182

The 1983 World Archery Championships was the 32nd edition of the event. It was held in Los Angeles, United States on 19–22 October 1983 and was organised by World Archery Federation (FITA).

== Medals summary ==
=== Recurve ===
Event	Gold	Silver	Bronze
Men's individual	Richard McKinney; United States	Darrell Pace; United States	Marnix Vervinck; Belgium
Women's individual	Kim Jin-ho; South Korea	Jung Jea-bong; South Korea	Liselotte Andersson; Sweden
Men's team	United States	South Korea	Belgium
Women's team	South Korea	West Germany	United States

== Medals table ==
Rank	Nation	Gold	Silver	Bronze	Total
1	South Korea	2	2	0	4
2	United States	2	1	1	4
3	West Germany	0	1	0	1
4	Belgium	0	0	2	2
5	Sweden	0	0	1	1
Totals (5 entries)		4	4	4	12
