= Lee Eun-kyung (archer) =

South Korean archer (born 1972)

Personal information
- Born: July 15, 1972 (age 53)
Medal record
Women's archery
Representing South Korea
Olympic Games
Gold medal – first place	1992 Barcelona	Team
World Championships
Gold medal – first place	1991 Krakow	Team
Gold medal – first place	1993 Antalya	Team
Gold medal – first place	1999 Riom	Individual
Silver medal – second place	1991 Krakow	Individual
Asian Games
Gold medal – first place	1990 Beijing	Team
Gold medal – first place	1994 Hiroshima	Individual
Gold medal – first place	1998 Bangkok	Team
Silver medal – second place	1990 Beijing	Individual
Silver medal – second place	1998 Bangkok	Individual
Bronze medal – third place	1994 Hiroshima	Team

Lee Eun-kyung (Korean: 이은경, born 15 July 1972) is a South Korean archer and Olympic champion.

== Career ==
She competed at the 1992 Summer Olympics in Barcelona, where she won a gold medal with the South Korean archery team.

She also competed at the Asian Games winning a gold medal in the team and silver in the individual events in 1990; a gold medal in the individual and bronze in the team events in 1994; and a gold medal in the team and silver medal in the individual events in 1998.
