= 1997 World Archery Championships =

- Location: Victoria, Canada
- Start date: 19 August 1997
- End date: 23 August 1997

The 1997 World Archery Championships was the 39th edition of the event. It was held in Victoria, Canada on 19–23 August 1997 and was organized by World Archery Federation (FITA).

== Medals table ==
* Host nation (Canada)

Rank	Nation	Gold	Silver	Bronze	Total
1	South Korea	4	0	2	6
2	Italy	2	0	0	2
3	United States	1	2	1	4
4	Hungary	1	0	0	1
5	France	0	1	1	2
6	Belgium	0	1	0	1
6	Germany	0	1	0	1
6	Norway	0	1	0	1
6	Spain	0	1	0	1
6	Ukraine	0	1	0	1
11	Australia	0	0	1	1
11	Canada*	0	0	1	1
11	Russia	0	0	1	1
11	Turkey	0	0	1	1
Totals (14 entries)		8	8	8	24

== Medals summary ==
=== Recurve ===
Event	Gold	Silver	Bronze
Men's individual	Kim Kyung-ho; South Korea	Christophe Peignois; Belgium	Jang Yong-ho; South Korea
Women's individual	Kim Du-ri; South Korea	Cornelia Pfohl; Germany	Kim Jo-sun; South Korea
Men's team	South Korea; Kim Kyung-ho; Jang Yong-ho; Kim Bo-ram	Norway; Martinus Grov; Bård Nesteng; H. Håkonsen	Russia; Baljinima Tsyrempilov; Dmitri Paltchekh; Yuri Leontiev
Women's team	South Korea; Kim Du-ri; Kim Jo-sun; Kang Hyun-ji	Ukraine; Yelena Sadovnitchaya; Lina Herasymenko; Tatiana Muntain	Turkey; Deniz Gunay; Zehra Öktem; Elif Altınkaynak

=== Compound ===
Event	Gold	Silver	Bronze
Men's individual	Dee Wilde; United States	Terry Ragsdale; United States	Clint Freeman; Australia
Women's individual	Fabiola Palazzini; Italy	Catherine Pellen; France	Jamie van Natta; United States
Men's team	Hungary; Tibor Ondrik; Antal Szokol; Janos Povaszan	Spain; Juan B. Sancho; Jose I. Catalan; Antonio Cerra	Canada; J.C. Lacerte; Brian Bagnall; Andy Fochuk
Women's team	Italy; Fabiola Palazzini; Serena Pisaro; Cristina Pernazza	United States; Jamie van Natta; Tara Swanney; Michelle Ragsdale	France; Catherine Pellen; Valerie Fabre; Catherine Deburck
