= 2009 World Archery Championships – Women's team recurve =

The women's team recurve competition at the 2009 World Archery Championships took place on 3–9 September 2009 in Ulsan, South Korea. 25 teams of 3 archers took part in the men's recurve qualification round on 4 September. The 16 teams with the highest cumulative totals qualified for the 4-round knockout round on 7 September which was drawn according to their qualification round scores. The semi-finals and finals then took place on 8 September.

Hosts Korea continued their dominance of the recurve competition, beating Japan in the final.

== Seeds ==
Seedings were based on the combined total of the team members' qualification scores in the individual ranking rounds. The top 16 teams were assigned places in the draw depending on their overall ranking.

1. (South Korea) Joo Hyun-jung / Kwak Ye-ji / Yun Ok-hee (champions)
2. (China) Ouyang Ruyu / Zhao Ling / Zhu Jiani (1st round)
3. (Chinese Taipei) Lin Hsiao-ying / Wu Hui-ju / Yuan Shu-chi (1st round)
4. (Ukraine) Victoriya Koval / Olena Kushniruk / Yulia Lobzhenidze (1st round)
5. (Georgia (country)) Asmat Diasamidze / Kristine Esebua / Khatuna Narimanidze (quarterfinal)
6. (Germany) Elena Richter / Christina Schaefer / Karina Winter (1st round)
7. (France) Cyrielle Delamare / Sophie Dodemont / Bérengère Schuh (quarterfinal)
8. (Colombia) Ana Rendón / Sigrid Romero / Natalia Sánchez (1st round)
9. (Poland) Małgorzata Ćwienczek / Karina Lipiarska / Justyna Mospinek (quarterfinal)
10. (United States) Kristin Braun / Khatuna Lorig / Jennifer Nichols (1st round)
11. (Italy) Pia Carmen Lionetti / Elena Tonetta / Natalia Valeeva (quarterfinal)
12. (Canada) Marie-Pier Beaudet / Alana MacDougall / Kateri Vrakking (1st round)
13. (Belarus) Elena Kuznetsova / Hanna Marusava / Katsiaryna Timofeyeva (4th place)
14. (Japan) Miki Kanie / Asako Matsunaga / Sayami Matsushita (2nd place)
15. (Russia) Tatyana Boroday / Natalya Erdyniyeva / Tatiana Segina (3rd place)
16. (United Kingdom) Charlotte Burgess / Naomi Folkard / Alison Williamson (1st round)

== Draw ==
1st round
1	South Korea	214
16	United Kingdom	201
9	Poland	208
8	Colombia	200
5	Georgia	206
12	Canada	200
13	Belarus	210
4	Ukraine	201
3	Chinese Taipei	212
14	Japan	214
11	Italy	218
6	Germany	212
7	France	222
10	United States	212
15	Russia	212
2	China	210

Quarterfinals
1	South Korea	220
9	Poland	207
5	Georgia	205
13	Belarus	208
14	Japan	218
11	Italy	215
7	France	204
15	Russia	215

Semifinals
1	South Korea	225
13	Belarus	216
14	Japan	218
15	Russia	214

Finals
1	South Korea	224
14	Japan	209
Third place
13	Belarus	199
15	Russia	204
