= Jutta Poikolainen =

Finnish archer (born 1963)

Personal information
- Born: 15 March 1963 (age 62) Tampere, Finland
- Height: 176 cm (5 ft 9 in)
- Weight: 63–65 kg (139–143 lb)

Sport
- Sport: Archery
- Club: Amarco, Hyvinkää

Jutta Anneli Poikolainen (née Vähäoja on 15 March 1963) is a retired Finnish archer. She competed at the 1988 Summer Olympics alongside her husband Tomi Poikolainen.
