= Archery at the 2014 Asian Games – Women's team recurve =

Women's team recurve at the 2014 Asian Games
- Venue: Gyeyang Asiad Archery Field
- Dates: 23–28 September 2014
- Competitors: 51 from 13 nations

Medalists
gold medal	South Korea; Chang Hye-jin, Jung Dasomi, Lee Tuk-young
silver medal	China; Cheng Ming, Xu Jing, Zhu Jueman
bronze medal	Japan; Ren Hayakawa, Yuki Hayashi, Kaori Kawanaka

The women's team recurve archery competition at the 2014 Asian Games in Incheon was held from 23 to 28 September at Gyeyang Asiad Archery Field.

A total of 13 teams participated in the qualification round with all 13 teams progressing to the knockout round. Each team consisted of the highest ranked three athletes from the qualification round.

== Schedule ==
All times are Korea Standard Time (UTC+09:00)

Date	Time	Event
Tuesday, 23 September 2014	10:00	Ranking round
Wednesday, 24 September 2014	10:00	Ranking round
Friday, 26 September 2014	09:30	1/8 eliminations
Friday, 26 September 2014	10:00	Quarterfinals
Friday, 26 September 2014	14:00	Semifinals
Sunday, 28 September 2014	10:00	Bronze medal match
Sunday, 28 September 2014	10:25	Gold medal match

== Results ==
=== Ranking round ===
Rank	Team	Distance				Total	10s	Xs
Rank	Team	70m	60m	50m	30m	Total	10s	Xs
1	South Korea (KOR)	1006	1025	989	1061	4081	232	107
	Chang Hye-jin	333	341	334	351	1359	75	31
	Joo Hyun-jung	~~310~~	~~341~~	~~321~~	~~352~~	~~1324~~	~~69~~	~~27~~
	Jung Dasomi	342	341	327	354	1364	76	42
	Lee Tuk-young	331	343	328	356	1358	81	34
2	China (CHN)	995	1022	981	1046	4044	225	81
	Cheng Ming	331	344	323	350	1348	78	26
	Xu Jing	337	337	332	346	1352	80	29
	Zhang Dan	~~327~~	~~331~~	~~318~~	~~348~~	~~1324~~	~~62~~	~~20~~
	Zhu Jueman	327	341	326	350	1344	67	26
3	Japan (JPN)	975	1012	970	1037	3994	186	70
	Ren Hayakawa	320	338	329	352	1339	68	22
	Yuki Hayashi	323	336	321	347	1327	58	25
	Ayano Kato	~~304~~	~~326~~	~~308~~	~~330~~	~~1268~~	~~41~~	~~14~~
	Kaori Kawanaka	332	338	320	338	1328	60	23
4	Chinese Taipei (TPE)	984	1003	956	1023	3966	181	66
	Lei Chien-ying	323	333	306	340	1302	59	24
	Lin Chia-en	334	333	328	337	1332	57	18
	Yang Nien-hsiu	~~309~~	~~328~~	~~315~~	~~340~~	~~1292~~	~~44~~	~~18~~
	Yuan Shu-chi	327	337	322	346	1332	65	24
5	India (IND)	962	996	956	1043	3957	171	57
	Deepika Kumari	324	339	326	348	1337	62	26
	Bombayla Devi Laishram	318	325	314	344	1301	51	12
	Laxmirani Majhi	320	332	316	351	1319	58	19
	Pranitha Vardhineni	~~303~~	~~316~~	~~307~~	~~345~~	~~1271~~	~~44~~	~~14~~
6	Indonesia (INA)	961	985	926	1025	3897	150	55
	Diananda Choirunisa	324	332	313	349	1318	63	22
	Ika Yuliana Rochmawati	317	326	313	338	1294	43	15
	Erwina Safitri	320	327	300	338	1285	44	18
	Titik Kusuma Wardani	~~299~~	~~322~~	~~312~~	~~340~~	~~1273~~	~~40~~	~~16~~
7	North Korea (PRK)	937	972	922	1021	3852	146	49
	Choe Song-hui	307	318	305	343	1273	49	21
	Kang Un-ju	321	330	316	341	1308	55	16
	Ri Un-ok	309	324	301	337	1271	42	12
	Ryu Un-hyang	~~298~~	~~320~~	~~303~~	~~343~~	~~1264~~	~~40~~	~~13~~
8	Kazakhstan (KAZ)	920	980	930	1014	3844	134	48
	Aruzhan Abdrazak	~~290~~	~~317~~	~~295~~	~~343~~	~~1245~~	~~41~~	~~9~~
	Yelena Li	299	322	295	334	1250	37	11
	Luiza Saidiyeva	309	331	319	338	1297	45	16
	Farida Tukebayeva	312	327	316	342	1297	52	21
9	Vietnam (VIE)	914	975	904	1001	3794	125	31
	Dương Thị Kim Liên	301	314	307	324	1246	40	7
	Lộc Thị Đào	313	327	302	340	1282	46	14
	Nguyễn Thị Quyền Trang	300	334	295	337	1266	39	10
10	Mongolia (MGL)	919	973	914	970	3776	134	42
	Jargalsaikhany Dagiijanchiv	~~284~~	~~293~~	~~285~~	~~312~~	~~1174~~	~~29~~	~~10~~
	Altangereliin Enkhtuyaa	308	327	325	345	1305	57	21
	Danzandorjiin Miroslava	312	315	287	283	1197	33	8
	Bishindeegiin Urantungalag	299	331	302	342	1274	44	13
11	Bangladesh (BAN)	881	926	860	1001	3668	104	25
	Rabeya Khatun	~~278~~	~~277~~	~~247~~	~~281~~	~~1083~~	~~18~~	~~5~~
	Mathui Prue Marma	304	324	301	340	1269	45	10
	Beauty Ray	279	283	261	324	1147	21	5
	Shamoli Ray	298	319	298	337	1252	38	10
12	Uzbekistan (UZB)	786	907	812	973	3478	69	18
	Madina Akramova	~~254~~	~~255~~	~~273~~	~~304~~	~~1086~~	~~16~~	~~5~~
	Munira Nurmanova	283	313	262	325	1183	24	10
	Irina Savinova	256	302	278	325	1161	16	6
	Khilola Yunusova	247	292	272	323	1134	29	2
13	Nepal (NEP)	818	896	704	918	3336	61	16
	Renu Lama	~~243~~	~~258~~	~~223~~	~~302~~	~~1026~~	~~13~~	~~6~~
	Monica Rana Magar	248	292	264	322	1126	15	3
	Krishna Maya Syangtan	290	302	190	291	1073	24	6
	Aisha Tamang	280	302	250	305	1137	22	7

- Chinese Taipei replaced Lei Chien-ying with Yang Nien-hsiu for the knockout round.

=== Knockout round ===
1/8 eliminations
9	Vietnam	48	50	40	49	2
8	Kazakhstan	46	53	48	51	6
5	India	50	56	52	6
12	Uzbekistan	34	47	31	0
13	Nepal	40	49	33	0
4	Chinese Taipei	52	52	50	6
11	Bangladesh	46	42	40	0
6	Indonesia	50	55	46	6
7	North Korea	50	51	42	52	6
10	Mongolia	54	46	34	48	2

Quarterfinals
1	South Korea	52	54	51	5
8	Kazakhstan	51	54	49	1
5	India	51	54	53	54	26	5
4	Chinese Taipei	49	56	52	55	24	4
3	Japan	53	47	53	53	29	5
8	Indonesia	52	54	52	54	27	4
7	North Korea	53	49	42	1
2	China	53	51	56	5

Semifinals
1	South Korea	56	58	56	6
5	India	50	54	54	0
3	Japan	52	53	55	0
2	China	54	56	58	6

Gold medal match
1	South Korea	54	56	58	6
2	China	51	55	52	0
Bronze medal match
5	India	53	58	51	55	26	4
3	Japan	54	55	50	58	27	5
