= Vitaliy Shin =

Kazakhstani archer (born 1961)

Personal information
- Nationality: Kazakhstani
- Born: 21 June 1961 (age 64)

Sport
- Sport: Archery

Vitaliy Shin (born 21 June 1961) is a Kazakhstani archer. He competed in the men's individual and team events at the 1996 Summer Olympics.
