= 1995 World Archery Championships =

- Location: Jakarta, Indonesia
- Start date: 1 August
- End date: 6 August

The 1995 World Archery Championships was the 38th edition of the event. It was held in Jakarta, Indonesia on 1–6 August 1995 and was organised by World Archery Federation (FITA).

The event marked the first championships where the compound discipline was contested. It also marked the last World Championships at which eventual women's recurve champion Natalia Valeeva represented Moldova (and previously Soviet Union) before switching allegiance to Italy, for whom she also triumphed at the 2007 World Championships.

== Medals summary ==
=== Recurve ===
Event	Gold	Silver	Bronze
Men's individual	Lee Kyung-chul; South Korea	Wu Tsung-yi; Chinese Taipei	Oh Kyo-moon; South Korea
Women's individual	Natalia Valeeva; Moldova	Barbara Mensing; Germany	Yoom Yoon-ja; South Korea
Men's team	South Korea; Kim Jae-rak; Oh Kyo-moon; Lee Kyung-chul	Italy; Matteo Bisiani; Andrea Parenti; Alessandro Rivolta	United States; Jay Barrs; Richard McKinney; Lonny King
Women's team	South Korea; Yoom Yoon-ja; Hwang Jin-hae; Kim Jo-sun	Turkey; Elif Ekşi; Natalia Nasaridze; Elif Altınkaynak	Indonesia; Hamdiah; Nurfitryana Lantang; Danahuri Dahliana

=== Compound ===
Event	Gold	Silver	Bronze
Men's individual	Gary Broadhead; United States	John Vozzy; United States	Phillip Tremelling; Australia
Women's individual	Angela Moscarelli; United States	Petra Ericsson; Sweden	Inga Low; United States
Men's team	France; Gerard Douis; Thomas Randall; Oliver Careau	United States; Gary Broadhead; John Vozzy; Tom Crowe	Australia; Phillip Tremelling; Michael Harkess; Clint Freeman
Women's team	United States; Angela Moscarelli; Inga Low; Michelle Ragsdale	Sweden; Helena Nelson; Petra Ericsson; Ulrika Sjöwall	Italy; Anna Campagnoli; Fabiola Palazzini; Carmen Ceriotti

== Medals table ==
Rank	Nation	Gold	Silver	Bronze	Total
1	United States	3	2	2	7
2	South Korea	3	0	2	5
3	France	1	0	0	1
3	Moldova	1	0	0	1
5	Sweden	0	2	0	2
6	Italy	0	1	1	2
7	Chinese Taipei	0	1	0	1
7	Germany	0	1	0	1
7	Turkey	0	1	0	1
10	Australia	0	0	2	2
11	Indonesia	0	0	1	1
Totals (11 entries)		8	8	8	24
