= Tang Hua =

Chinese archer (born 1977)

Personal information
- Nationality: Chinese
- Born: 6 September 1977 (age 48)
- Height: 175 cm (5 ft 9 in)
- Weight: 77 kg (170 lb)

Sport
- Sport: Archery
Medal record
Men's recurve archery
Representing China
Asian Games
Bronze medal – third place	1998 Bangkok	Team
Asian Championships
Silver medal – second place	1999 Beijing	Team

Tang Hua (Chinese: 唐華, born 6 September 1977) is a Chinese former archer. He competed at the 1996 Summer Olympics and the 2000 Summer Olympics.
