= Jang Yong-ho =

South Korean archer (born 1976)

Personal information
- Born: April 4, 1976 (age 50)
Medal record
Men's archery
Representing South Korea
Olympic Games
Gold medal – first place	2000 Sydney	Team
Gold medal – first place	2004 Athens	Team
Silver medal – second place	1996 Atlanta	Team
World Championships
Gold medal – first place	1997 Victoria	Team
Gold medal – first place	2003 New York	Team
Silver medal – second place	1999 Riom	Team
Bronze medal – third place	1997 Victoria	Individual
Asian Games
Gold medal – first place	2006 Doha	Team

- Jang Yong-ho
- Hangul: 장용호
- Hanja: 張龍浩
- RR: Jang Yongho
- MR: Chang Yongho

Jang Yong-ho (born April 4, 1976) is a South Korean archer.

Jang competed for Korea at the 2004 Summer Olympics in men's individual archery. He won his first match, advancing to the round of 32. In the second round of elimination, he was again victorious and advanced to the round of 16. The third match was Jang's downfall, as he lost to eventual bronze medalist Tim Cuddihy of Australia. Jang placed 11th overall.

Jang was also a member of Korea's gold medal men's archery team at the 2000 Summer Olympics.

Jang competed at the 2006 Asian Games and won a gold medal with the South Korean team.

Jang holds the world record for 90 meters with a score of 338 points shot during the 2003 World Championships, tournament where he remarkably only shot one single arrow outside the gold ring.
