= 1989 World Archery Championships =

- Location: Lausanne, Switzerland
- Start date: 2 July
- End date: 8 July

The 1989 World Archery Championships was the 35th edition of the event. It was held in Lausanne, Switzerland on 2–8 July 1989 and was organised by World Archery Federation (FITA).

Soviet archer Stanislav Zabrodsky, winner of the men's individual recurve competition, set 4 world records during the competition.

== Medals summary ==
=== Recurve ===
Event	Gold	Silver	Bronze
Men's individual	Stanislav Zabrodsky; Soviet Union	Steven Hallard; Great Britain	Tomi Poikolainen; Finland
Women's individual	Kim Soo-nyung; South Korea	Kim Kyung-woog; South Korea	Denise Parker; United States
Men's team	Soviet Union	United States	South Korea
Women's team	South Korea	Sweden	Soviet Union

== Medals table ==
Rank	Nation	Gold	Silver	Bronze	Total
1	South Korea	2	1	1	4
2	Soviet Union	2	0	1	3
3	United States	0	1	1	2
4	Great Britain	0	1	0	1
4	Sweden	0	1	0	1
6	Finland	0	0	1	1
Totals (6 entries)		4	4	4	12
