= Oh Kyo-moon =

South Korean archer (born 1972)

Medal record

Men's archery

Olympic Games
Gold medal – first place	2000 Sydney	Team
Silver medal – second place	1996 Atlanta	Team
Bronze medal – third place	1996 Atlanta	Individual

World Championships
Gold medal – first place	1995 Jakarta	Team
Bronze medal – third place	1995 Jakarta	Individual

Asian Games
Gold medal – first place	1994 Hiroshima	Team
Gold medal – first place	1998 Bangkok	Team

Asian Championships
Gold medal – first place	1997 Langkawi	Individual

- Oh Kyo-moon
- Hangul: 오교문
- Hanja: 吳教文
- RR: O Gyomun
- MR: O Kyomun

Oh Kyo-moon (born March 2, 1972) is an archer from South Korea.

He won a team silver medal and an individual bronze medal at the 1996 Summer Olympics. Oh also was a member of Korea's gold medal men's archery team at the 2000 Summer Olympics. In the men's individual competition, he finished sixth.

He was the world record holder for a single FITA with a score of 1379. That score was beaten by Oh Jin-hyek at the 2009 World Championships in Ulsan with 1386 points.
