= Chung Jae-hun (archer) =

South Korean archer (born 1974)

Medal record

Men's Archery

Representing South Korea

Olympic Games
Silver medal – second place	1992 Barcelona	Individual

World Championships
Gold medal – first place	1991 Krakow	Team
Gold medal – first place	2005 Madrid	Individual
Gold medal – first place	2005 Madrid	Team
Bronze medal – third place	1991 Krakow	Individual

Asian Games
Gold medal – first place	1994 Hiroshima	Team
Silver medal – second place	1994 Hiroshima	Individual

Indoor World Championships
Bronze medal – third place	1999 Havana	Individual

Chung Jae-hun (Korean: 정재헌) is an archer from South Korea.

== Career ==
He competed for South Korea at the 1992 Summer Olympics held in Barcelona, Spain in the individual event where he won a silver medal behind Frenchman Sebastien Flute. He was also part of the South Korean team that finished fifth in the team event.
