= Lee Chang-hwan =

South Korean archer (born 1982)

Medal record

Men's recurve rchery

Representing South Korea

Olympic Games
Gold medal – first place	2008 Beijing	Team

World Championships
Gold medal – first place	2009 Ulsan	Individual
Gold medal – first place	2009 Ulsan	Team
Gold medal – first place	2007 Leipzig	Team
Gold medal – first place	2001 Beijing	Team

Asian Games
Gold medal – first place	2006 Doha	Team

Asian Championships
Gold medal – first place	2009 Denpasar	Team

Summer Universiade
Silver medal – second place	2003 Daegu	Individual
Silver medal – second place	2003 Daegu	Team

- Lee Chang-hwan
- Hangul: 이창환
- Hanja: 李昌奐
- RR: I Changhwan
- MR: I Ch'anghwan

Lee Chang-hwan (Korean pronunciation: [i.tɕʰaŋ.ɦwan]; born 16 March 1982) is a professional archer from South Korea. He competed in Archery at the 2006 Asian Games and won a gold medal with the men's team consisting of himself, Im Dong-hyun, Jang Yong-ho and Park Kyung-mo.

== 2008 Summer Olympics ==
At the 2008 Summer Olympics in Beijing Lee finished his ranking round with a total of 669 points, ten points behind leader Juan René Serrano. This gave him the tenth seed for the final competition bracket in which he faced Jiang Lin in the first round, beating the Chinese 112–108. In the second round Lee was too strong for Yusuf Ergin (117-109), breaking the Olympic Record. However, in the third round Lee and Cheng Chu-sian both came to 105 points and in the extra round Lee scored 18 points, while Cheng scored 19 points and eliminated Lee.

Together with Im Dong-hyun and Park Kyung-mo, he also took part in the team event. With his 669 score from the ranking round combined with the 670 of Im and the 676 of Park the Koreans were in first position after the ranking round, which gave them a straight seed into the quarter-finals. With 224-222 they were too strong for the Polish team and in the semi-final they beat home nation China 221–218. In the final Italy came close, but South Korea took the title with 227–225.
