= 1981 World Archery Championships =

- Location: Punta Ala, Italy
- Start date: June
- Competitors: 219

The 1981 World Archery Championships was the 31st edition of the event. It was held in Punta Ala, Italy in June 1981 and was organised by World Archery Federation (FITA).

== Medals summary ==
=== Recurve ===
Event	Gold	Silver	Bronze
Men's individual	Kyösti Laasonen; Finland	Darrell Pace; United States	Richard McKinney; United States
Women's individual	Natalya Butuzova; Soviet Union	Alicja Ciskowska; Poland	Marilyn Rumley; Australia
Men's team	United States	Finland	Soviet Union
Women's team	Soviet Union	South Korea	China

== Medals table ==
Rank	Nation	Gold	Silver	Bronze	Total
1	Soviet Union	2	0	1	3
2	United States	1	1	1	3
3	Finland	1	1	0	2
4	Poland	0	1	0	1
4	South Korea	0	1	0	1
6	Australia	0	0	1	1
6	China	0	0	1	1
Totals (7 entries)		4	4	4	12
