= 1991 World Archery Championships =

- Location: Kraków, Poland
- Start date: 19 August
- End date: 24 August

The 1991 World Archery Championships was the 36th edition of the event. It was held in Kraków, Poland on 19–24 August 1991 and was organised by World Archery Federation (FITA).

It marked the last time the Soviet Union competed in the World Championships.

== Medals summary ==
=== Recurve ===
Event	Gold	Silver	Bronze
Men's individual	Simon Fairweather; Australia	Vadim Shikarev; Soviet Union	Chung Jae-hun; South Korea
Women's individual	Kim Soo-nyung; South Korea	Lee Eun-kyung; South Korea	Zehra Öktem; Turkey
Men's team	South Korea	Soviet Union	United States
Women's team	South Korea	Soviet Union	Sweden

== Medals table ==
Rank	Nation	Gold	Silver	Bronze	Total
1	South Korea	3	1	1	5
2	Australia	1	0	0	1
3	Soviet Union	0	3	0	3
4	Sweden	0	0	1	1
4	Turkey	0	0	1	1
4	United States	0	0	1	1
Totals (6 entries)		4	4	4	12
