= Kim Kyung-ho (archer) =

South Korean archer

Medal record

Men's archery

Representing South Korea

World Championships
Gold medal – first place	1997 Victoria	Individual
Gold medal – first place	1997 Victoria	Team
Silver medal – second place	1993 Antalya	Individual
Silver medal – second place	1993 Antalya	Team

Asian Games

Kim Kyung-Ho (Korean: 김경호) is a South Korean archer who won the 1997 World Archery Championships in Victoria, British Columbia.
