= Han Seung-hoon =

South Korean archer (born 1973)

Personal information
- Nationality: South Korean
- Born: 11 June 1973 (age 53)

Sport
- Sport: Archery
Medal record
Men's recurve archery
Representing South Korea
World Championships
Gold medal – first place	1995 Jakarta	Team
Gold medal – first place	2005 Madrid	Team
Silver medal – second place	1993 Antalya	Team
Asian Games
Gold medal – first place	1998 Bangkok	Individual
Gold medal – first place	1998 Bangkok	Team
Gold medal – first place	2002 Busan	Team
Asian Championships
Gold medal – first place	2005 New Delhi	Team

Han Seung-hoon (born 11 June 1973) is a South Korean former archer. He competed in the men's individual and team events at the 1992 Summer Olympics.
