= Jayanta Talukdar =

Indian archer

Personal information
- Born: 2 March 1986 (age 40) Guwahati, India
Medal record
Men's recurve archery
Representing India
World Championships
Silver medal – second place	2005 Madrid	Team
World Cup
Gold medal – first place	2006 Merida	Individual
Asian Games
Bronze medal – third place	2006 Doha	Team
Bronze medal – third place	2010 Guangzhou	Team
Asian Archery Championships
Gold medal – first place	2007 Xi'an	Team
Gold medal – first place	2013 Taipei	Mixed Team
Silver medal – second place	2005 New Delhi	Team
Silver medal – second place	2009 Denpasar	Team
Silver medal – second place	2017 Dhaka	Team
Bronze medal – third place	2009 Denpasar	Individual
Bronze medal – third place	2015 Taipei	Mixed Team
Bronze medal – third place	2019 Bangkok	Team
Bronze medal – third place	2005 New Delhi	Team

Jayanta Talukdar (born 2 March 1986 in Guwahati) is an Indian archer from Assam. He has won individual gold Medal in the 2006 Archery World Cup.

== Career ==
Talukdar was part of the Indian team that won the silver medal at the 2004 Junior World Championships. He followed up with a gold medal at the FITA Meteksan World Cup in 2006, becoming the first Indian archer (bhartiya tirandaj) to win gold at the event. In 2006 he also won a gold medal at the South Asian Games and a bronze medal in the team competition at the 2006 Asian Games.

Despite losses in 2009, the Tata Steel sponsored Talukdar was seeded Number 1 for the 2009 World Cup in Copenhagen.

On 21 June 2012, Jayanta Talukdar made it to the Indian men's recurve archers team for London Olympics 2012, he competed in both the men's individual and the men's team events. He lost to Jacob Wukie in the first round of the individual event, and India lost to Japan in the first round of the team event.

In November, 2015, he won bronze medal in the 2015 Asian Archery Championships with Deepika Kumari in the Recurve Mixed Team event.

== Tokyo Olympics ==
He is most probably in for the Tokyo 2021 Olympic Games.

== Awards ==
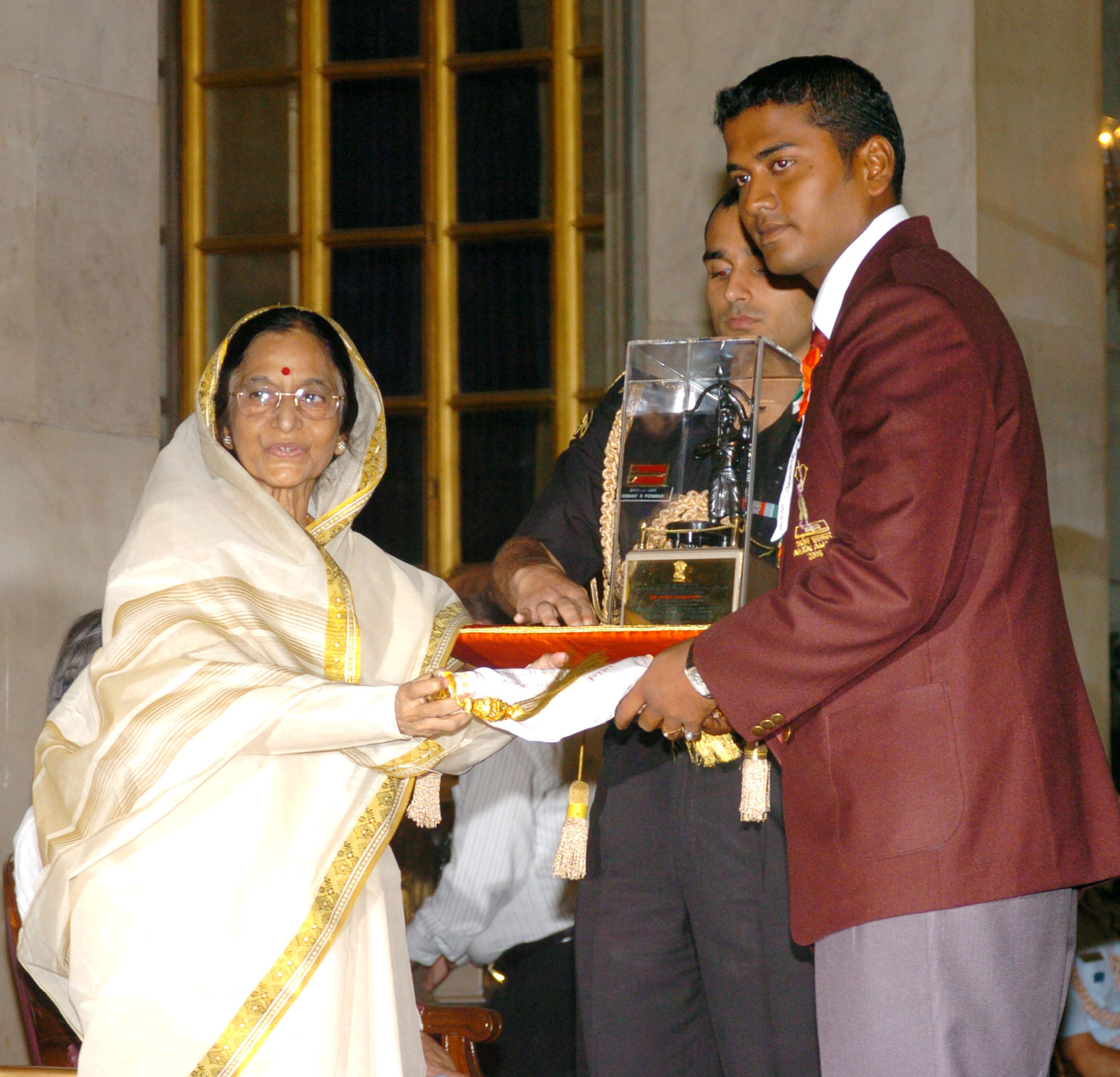
The President, Smt. Pratibha Patil presenting the Arjuna Award -2006 to Shri Jayanta Talukdar for Archery at a glittering function, in New Delhi on August 29, 2006

Jayanta was awarded the Arjuna Award in archery in August, 2007.
