= Takayoshi Matsushita =

Japanese archer (born 1953)

Personal information
- Nationality: Japanese
- Born: 30 January 1953 (age 73)

Sport
- Sport: Archery

Takayoshi Matsushita (松下和幹, Matsushita Takayoshi; born 30 January 1953) is a Japanese archer. He competed at the 1984, 1988, 1996 and the 2000 Summer Olympics.
