= List of Asian Games medalists in archery =

This is the complete list of Asian Games medalists in archery from 1978 to 2026.

== Men ==
=== Individual recurve ===
Games	Gold	Silver	Bronze
1978 Bangkok	Ichiro Shimamura (JPN)	Yoshiro Miyata (JPN)	Izumi Sato (JPN)
1982 New Delhi	Hiroshi Yamamoto (JPN)	Kim Young-woon (KOR)	Takayoshi Matsushita (JPN)
1986 Seoul	Takayoshi Matsushita (JPN)	Yang Chang-hoon (KOR)	Koo Ja-chung (KOR)
1990 Beijing	Yang Chang-hoon (KOR)	Takayoshi Matsushita (JPN)	Kim Sun-bin (KOR)
1994 Hiroshima	Park Kyung-mo (KOR)	Chung Jae-hun (KOR)	Wu Tsung-yi (TPE)
1998 Bangkok	Han Seung-hoon (KOR)	Kim Kyung-ho (KOR)	Wataru Haraguchi (JPN)
2002 Busan	Hiroshi Yamamoto (JPN)	Yuji Hamano (JPN)	Im Dong-hyun (KOR)
2006 Doha	Im Dong-hyun (KOR)	Tomokazu Wakino (JPN)	Kuo Cheng-wei (TPE)
2010 Guangzhou	Kim Woo-jin (KOR)	Tarundeep Rai (IND)	Sung Chia-chun (TPE)
2014 Incheon	Oh Jin-hyek (KOR)	Yong Zhiwei (CHN)	Kuo Cheng-wei (TPE)
2018 Jakarta–Palembang	Kim Woo-jin (KOR)	Lee Woo-seok (KOR)	Riau Ega Agata (INA)
2022 Hangzhou	Baatarkhuyagiin Otgonbold (MGL)	Qi Xiangshuo (CHN)	Lee Woo-seok (KOR)
2026 Aichi–Nagoya	Lee Woo-seok (KOR)	Junya Nakanishi (JPN)	Neeraj Chauhan (IND)

=== Team recurve ===
Games	Gold	Silver	Bronze
1978 Bangkok	Japan (JPN); Yoshiro Miyata; Izumi Sato; Ichiro Shimamura	China (CHN); Hao Shengqi; Ji Zhangmin; Wang Youqun	Indonesia (INA); Adang Adjidji; Siddak Jubadjati; Donald Pandiangan
1982 New Delhi	South Korea (KOR); Eum Sun-ki; Kim Young-woon; Lee Yong-ho	Indonesia (INA); Tatang Ferry Budiman; Donald Pandiangan; Suradi Rukimin	China (CHN); Feng Zemin; Ru Guang; Wang Youqun
1986 Seoul	South Korea (KOR); Chun In-soo; Koo Ja-chung; Park Kyung-sang; Yang Chang-hoon	Japan (JPN); Tokuyuki Kawai; Takayoshi Matsushita; Ichiro Shimamura; Hiroshi Yamamoto	China (CHN); Cao Ling; Duan Hongjun; Liang Qiuzhong; Ru Guang
1990 Beijing	South Korea (KOR); Kim Sun-bin; Park Jae-pyo; Yang Chang-hoon	Japan (JPN); Takayoshi Matsushita; Sadamu Nishikawa; Hiroshi Yamamoto	Chinese Taipei (TPE); Chiu Ping-kun; Tseng Cheng-jen; Tu Chih-chen
1994 Hiroshima	South Korea (KOR); Chung Jae-hun; Oh Kyo-moon; Park Kyung-mo	Japan (JPN); Takayoshi Matsushita; Sadamu Nishikawa; Hiroshi Yamamoto	Kazakhstan (KAZ); Vadim Shikarev; Vitaliy Shin; Vladimir Yesheyev
1998 Bangkok	South Korea (KOR); Han Seung-hoon; Kim Kyung-ho; Oh Kyo-moon	Chinese Taipei (TPE); Chang Chia-pin; Chiu Po-han; Wu Tsung-yi	China (CHN); Gao Yu; Tang Hua; Zhao Faqiao
2002 Busan	South Korea (KOR); Han Seung-hoon; Im Dong-hyun; Kim Kyung-ho; Kim Sek-keoan	Chinese Taipei (TPE); Chen Szu-yuan; Liao Chien-nan; Liu Ming-huang; Wang Cheng-pang	Kazakhstan (KAZ); Alexandr Li; Vitaliy Shin; Maxim Yelisseyev; Stanislav Zabrodskiy
2006 Doha	South Korea (KOR); Im Dong-hyun; Jang Yong-ho; Lee Chang-hwan; Park Kyung-mo	Chinese Taipei (TPE); Chen Szu-yuan; Hsu Tzu-yi; Kuo Cheng-wei; Wang Cheng-pang	India (IND); Mangal Singh Champia; Tarundeep Rai; Jayanta Talukdar; Vishwas
2010 Guangzhou	South Korea (KOR); Im Dong-hyun; Kim Woo-jin; Oh Jin-hyek	China (CHN); Chen Wenyuan; Dai Xiaoxiang; Xing Yu	India (IND); Rahul Banerjee; Mangal Singh Champia; Jayanta Talukdar
2014 Incheon	China (CHN); Gu Xuesong; Qi Kaiyao; Yong Zhiwei	Malaysia (MAS); Atiq Bazil Bakri; Haziq Kamaruddin; Khairul Anuar Mohamad	South Korea (KOR); Ku Bon-chan; Lee Seung-yun; Oh Jin-hyek
2018 Jakarta–Palembang	Chinese Taipei (TPE); Luo Wei-min; Tang Chih-chun; Wei Chun-heng	South Korea (KOR); Kim Woo-jin; Lee Woo-seok; Oh Jin-hyek	China (CHN); Li Jialun; Sun Quan; Xu Tianyu
2022 Hangzhou	South Korea (KOR); Kim Je-deok; Lee Woo-seok; Oh Jin-hyek	India (IND); Dhiraj Bommadevara; Atanu Das; Tushar Shelke	Indonesia (INA); Riau Ega Agata; Ahmad Khoirul Baasith; Arif Dwi Pangestu
2026 Aichi–Nagoya	South Korea (KOR); Kim Woo-jin; Kim Je-deok; Lee Woo-seok	India (IND); Dhiraj Bommadevara; Neeraj Chauhan; Yashdeep Bhoge	Chinese Taipei (TPE); Tang Chih-chun; Lin Zih-siang; Cheng Hsiang-hui

=== Individual compound ===
Games	Gold	Silver	Bronze
2014 Incheon	Esmaeil Ebadi (IRI)	Abhishek Verma (IND)	Paul Dela Cruz (PHI)
2022 Hangzhou	Ojas Deotale (IND)	Abhishek Verma (IND)	Yang Jae-won (KOR)
2026 Aichi–Nagoya	Kim Jong-ho (KOR)	Chang Cheng-Wei (TPE)	Mani Ratnam (IND)

=== Team compound ===
Games	Gold	Silver	Bronze
2014 Incheon	India (IND); Rajat Chauhan; Sandeep Kumar; Abhishek Verma	South Korea (KOR); Choi Yong-hee; Min Li-hong; Yang Young-ho	Iran (IRI); Esmaeil Ebadi; Majid Gheidi; Amir Kazempour
2018 Jakarta–Palembang	South Korea (KOR); Choi Yong-hee; Hong Sung-ho; Kim Jong-ho	India (IND); Rajat Chauhan; Aman Saini; Abhishek Verma	Malaysia (MAS); Alang Arif Aqil; Lee Kin Lip; Juwaidi Mazuki
2022 Hangzhou	India (IND); Ojas Deotale; Prathamesh Jawkar; Abhishek Verma	South Korea (KOR); Joo Jae-hoon; Kim Jong-ho; Yang Jae-won	Malaysia (MAS); Alang Arif Aqil; Syafiq Ariffin; Juwaidi Mazuki
2026 Aichi–Nagoya	India (IND); Sahil Jadhav; Kushal Dalal; Mani Ratnam	China (CHN); Liao Jiahao; Liu Jinyi; Shi Jingyu	Chinese Taipei (TPE); Chang Cheng-wei; Chen Chieh-lun; Yen Tzu-hsiang

=== Individual recurve 30 m ===
Games	Gold	Silver	Bronze
1986 Seoul	Yang Chang-hoon (KOR)	Koo Ja-chung (KOR)	Chun In-soo (KOR)

=== Individual recurve 50 m ===
Games	Gold	Silver	Bronze
1986 Seoul	Yang Chang-hoon (KOR)	Takayoshi Matsushita (JPN)	Hiroshi Yamamoto (JPN)

=== Individual recurve 70 m ===
Games	Gold	Silver	Bronze
1986 Seoul	Yang Chang-hoon (KOR)	Koo Ja-chung (KOR)	Chun In-soo (KOR)

=== Individual recurve 90 m ===
Games	Gold	Silver	Bronze
1986 Seoul	Takayoshi Matsushita (JPN)	Koo Ja-chung (KOR)	Chun In-soo (KOR)

== Women ==
=== Individual recurve ===
Games	Gold	Silver	Bronze
1978 Bangkok	Kim Jin-ho (KOR)	Yuriko Goto (JPN)	Kim Hyang-min (PRK)
1982 New Delhi	O Gwang-sun (PRK)	Kim Jin-ho (KOR)	Kim Mi-young (KOR)
1986 Seoul	Park Jung-ah (KOR)	Kim Jin-ho (KOR)	Kim Mi-ja (KOR)
1990 Beijing	Lee Jang-mi (KOR)	Lee Eun-kyung (KOR)	Kim Soo-nyung (KOR)
1994 Hiroshima	Lee Eun-kyung (KOR)	Lim Jung-ah (KOR)	Han Hee-jeong (KOR)
1998 Bangkok	Kim Jo-sun (KOR)	Lee Eun-kyung (KOR)	Lin Sang (CHN)
2002 Busan	Yuan Shu-chi (TPE)	Kim Mun-joung (KOR)	Yun Mi-jin (KOR)
2006 Doha	Park Sung-hyun (KOR)	Yun Ok-hee (KOR)	Zhao Ling (CHN)
2010 Guangzhou	Yun Ok-hee (KOR)	Cheng Ming (CHN)	Kwon Un-sil (PRK)
2014 Incheon	Jung Dasomi (KOR)	Chang Hye-jin (KOR)	Xu Jing (CHN)
2018 Jakarta–Palembang	Zhang Xinyan (CHN)	Diananda Choirunisa (INA)	Kang Chae-young (KOR)
2022 Hangzhou	Lim Si-hyeon (KOR)	An San (KOR)	Li Jiaman (CHN)
2026 Aichi–Nagoya	Kumkum Mohod (IND)	Oh Ye-jin (KOR)	Huang Yuwei (CHN)

=== Team recurve ===
Games	Gold	Silver	Bronze
1978 Bangkok	Japan (JPN); Yuriko Goto; Noriko Inoue; Yoshiko Okazaki	South Korea (KOR); Hwang Sook-zoo; Kim Jin-ho; Oh Young-sook	North Korea (PRK); Han Sun-hi; Jang Sun-yong; Kim Hyang-min
1982 New Delhi	South Korea (KOR); Kim Jin-ho; Kim Mi-young; Park Young-sook	North Korea (PRK); Kim Hye-suk; Kim Tae-suk; O Gwang-sun	China (CHN); Guo Meizhen; Kong Yaping; Meng Fanai
1986 Seoul	South Korea (KOR); Kim Jin-ho; Kim Mi-ja; Lee Seon-hee; Park Jung-ah	China (CHN); Li Renfeng; Ma Shaorong; Ma Xiangjun; Yao Yawen	Japan (JPN); Hiroko Ishizu; Akiko Kodama; Masayo Shibata; Keiko Suwa
1990 Beijing	South Korea (KOR); Kim Soo-nyung; Lee Eun-kyung; Lee Jang-mi	Chinese Taipei (TPE); Chin Chiu-yueh; Lai Fang-mei; Liu Pi-yu	North Korea (PRK); Kim Jong-hwa; Kim Ok-hui; Ri Myong-gum
1994 Hiroshima	China (CHN); He Ying; Lin Sang; Wang Xiaozhu	Indonesia (INA); Danahuri Dahliana; Rusena Gelanteh; Purnama Pandiangan	South Korea (KOR); Han Hee-jeong; Lee Eun-kyung; Lim Jung-ah
1998 Bangkok	South Korea (KOR); Kim Jo-sun; Lee Eun-kyung; Lee Mi-jeong	China (CHN); He Ying; Lin Sang; Wang Xiaozhu	Kazakhstan (KAZ); Viktoriya Beloslyudtseva; Irina Leonova; Yelena Plotnikova
2002 Busan	South Korea (KOR); Kim Mun-joung; Park Hye-youn; Park Sung-hyun; Yun Mi-jin	Chinese Taipei (TPE); Chen Hsin-i; Peng Wei-ting; Tsai Ching-wen; Yuan Shu-chi	China (CHN); Han Lu; Yang Jianping; Yu Hui; Zhang Juanjuan
2006 Doha	South Korea (KOR); Lee Tuk-young; Park Sung-hyun; Yun Mi-jin; Yun Ok-hee	China (CHN); Qian Jialing; Yu Hui; Zhang Juanjuan; Zhao Ling	Chinese Taipei (TPE); Lai Yi-hsin; Lin Hua-shan; Wu Hui-ju; Yuan Shu-chi
2010 Guangzhou	South Korea (KOR); Joo Hyun-jung; Ki Bo-bae; Yun Ok-hee	China (CHN); Cheng Ming; Zhang Yunlu; Zhu Shanshan	India (IND); Dola Banerjee; Rimil Buriuly; Deepika Kumari
2014 Incheon	South Korea (KOR); Chang Hye-jin; Jung Dasomi; Lee Tuk-young	China (CHN); Cheng Ming; Xu Jing; Zhu Jueman	Japan (JPN); Ren Hayakawa; Yuki Hayashi; Kaori Kawanaka
2018 Jakarta–Palembang	South Korea (KOR); Chang Hye-jin; Kang Chae-young; Lee Eun-gyeong	Chinese Taipei (TPE); Lei Chien-ying; Peng Chia-mao; Tan Ya-ting	Japan (JPN); Ayano Kato; Kaori Kawanaka; Tomomi Sugimoto
2022 Hangzhou	South Korea (KOR); An San; Choi Mi-sun; Lim Si-hyeon	China (CHN); An Qixuan; Hailigan; Li Jiaman	India (IND); Ankita Bhakat; Bhajan Kaur; Simranjeet Kaur
2026 Aichi–Nagoya	India (IND); Ankita Bhakat; Kirti Sharma; Kumkum Mohod	South Korea (KOR); Kang Chae-young; Lee Yun-ji; Oh Ye-jin	China (CHN); Zhu Jingyi; Huang Yuwei; Yu Qi

=== Individual compound ===
Games	Gold	Silver	Bronze
2014 Incheon	Choi Bo-min (KOR)	Seok Ji-hyun (KOR)	Trisha Deb (IND)
2022 Hangzhou	Jyothi Surekha (IND)	So Chae-won (KOR)	Aditi Swami (IND)
2026 Aichi–Nagoya	Nurisa Dian Ashrifah (INA)	Amaya Cojuangco (PHI)	Kang Yeon-seo (KOR)

=== Team compound ===
Games	Gold	Silver	Bronze
2014 Incheon	South Korea (KOR); Choi Bo-min; Kim Yun-hee; Seok Ji-hyun	Chinese Taipei (TPE); Chen Li-ju; Huang I-jou; Wu Ting-ting	India (IND); Trisha Deb; Purvasha Shende; Jyothi Surekha
2018 Jakarta–Palembang	South Korea (KOR); Choi Bo-min; So Chae-won; Song Yun-soo	India (IND); Muskan Kirar; Madhumita Kumari; Jyothi Surekha	Chinese Taipei (TPE); Chen Li-ju; Chen Yi-hsuan; Lin Ming-ching
2022 Hangzhou	India (IND); Parneet Kaur; Jyothi Surekha; Aditi Swami	Chinese Taipei (TPE); Chen Yi-hsuan; Huang I-jou; Wang Lu-yun	South Korea (KOR); Cho Su-a; Oh Yoo-hyun; So Chae-won
2026 Aichi–Nagoya	India (IND); Chikitha Taniparthi; Jyothi Surekha; Prithika Pradeep	China (CHN); Wang Yue; Wei Fangyao; Wunier	South Korea (KOR); Kang Yeon-seo; Park Jung-yoon; Park Ye-rin

=== Individual recurve 30 m ===
Games	Gold	Silver	Bronze
1986 Seoul	Kim Jin-ho (KOR)	Park Jung-ah (KOR)	Kim Mi-ja (KOR)

=== Individual recurve 50 m ===
Games	Gold	Silver	Bronze
1986 Seoul	Park Jung-ah (KOR)	Kim Mi-ja (KOR)	Ma Xiangjun (CHN)

=== Individual recurve 60 m ===
Games	Gold	Silver	Bronze
1986 Seoul	Kim Jin-ho (KOR)	Park Jung-ah (KOR)	Akiko Kodama (JPN)

=== Individual recurve 70 m ===
Games	Gold	Silver	Bronze
1986 Seoul	Ma Xiangjun (CHN)	Kim Jin-ho (KOR)	Park Jung-ah (KOR)

== Mixed ==
=== Team recurve ===
Games	Gold	Silver	Bronze
2018 Jakarta–Palembang	Japan (JPN); Takaharu Furukawa; Tomomi Sugimoto	North Korea (PRK); Pak Yong-won; Kang Un-ju	China (CHN); Xu Tianyu; Zhang Xinyan
2022 Hangzhou	South Korea (KOR); Lee Woo-seok; Lim Si-hyeon	Japan (JPN); Takaharu Furukawa; Satsuki Noda	Indonesia (INA); Riau Ega Agata; Diananda Choirunisa
2026 Aichi–Nagoya	China (CHN); Zhu Jingyi; Li Mengqi	India (IND); Kumkum Mohod; Dhiraj Bommadevara	South Korea (KOR); Kang Chae-young; Kim Je-deok

=== Team compound ===
Games	Gold	Silver	Bronze
2018 Jakarta–Palembang	Chinese Taipei (TPE); Pan Yu-ping; Chen Yi-hsuan	South Korea (KOR); Kim Jong-ho; So Chae-won	Iran (IRI); Nima Mahboubi; Fereshteh Ghorbani
2022 Hangzhou	India (IND); Ojas Deotale; Jyothi Surekha	South Korea (KOR); Joo Jae-hoon; So Chae-won	Chinese Taipei (TPE); Chang Cheng-wei; Chen Yi-hsuan
2026 Aichi–Nagoya	India (IND); Chikitha Taniparthi; Sahil Jadhav	South Korea (KOR); Park Jung-yoon; Choi Yong-hee	China (CHN); Wei Fangyao; Liu Jinyi
