= Archery at the 1984 Summer Olympics – Men's individual =

Archery at the Olympics

Men's individual at the Games of the XXIII Olympiad
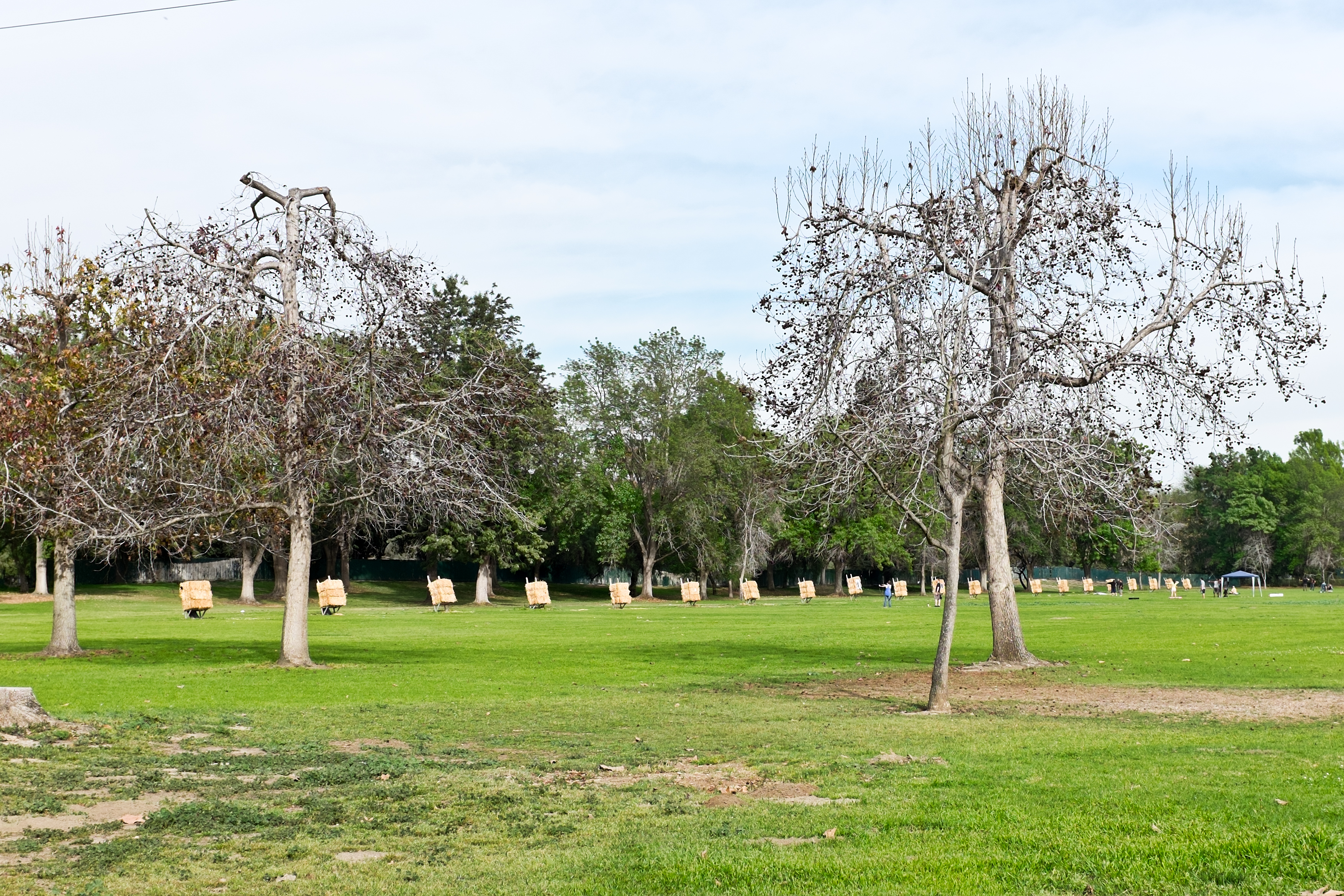
- Archery range at the El Dorado Regional Park, where the event took place
- Venue: El Dorado Park
- Dates: 8–11 August 1984
- Competitors: 62 from 31 nations
- Winning score: 2616

Medalists
1st place, gold medalist(s)		Darrell Pace	United States
2nd place, silver medalist(s)		Richard McKinney	United States
3rd place, bronze medalist(s)		Hiroshi Yamamoto	Japan

The men's individual archery event at the 1984 Summer Olympics was part of the archery programme. The event consisted of a double FITA round. For each round, the archer shot 36 arrows at each of four distances—90, 50, 70, and 30 metres. The highest score for each arrow was 10 points, giving a possible maximum of 2880 points.

== Records ==
The following new Olympic records were set during this competition.

Record	Round	Name	Nationality	Score	OR
Single FITA round	First	Darrell Pace	United States	1317	OR
Double FITA round	Combined	Darrell Pace	United States	2616	OR

== Results ==
Rank	Archer	Nation	Round 1 Score	Round 1 Rank	Round 2 Score	Round 2 Rank	Total Score
1st place, gold medalist(s)	Darrell Pace	United States	1317 (OR)	1	1299	1	2616 (OR)
2nd place, silver medalist(s)	Richard McKinney	United States	1295	2	1269	5	2564
3rd place, bronze medalist(s)	Hiroshi Yamamoto	Japan	1276	3	1287	3	2563
4	Takayoshi Matsushita	Japan	1264	7	1288	2	2552
5	Tomi Poikolainen	Finland	1275	4	1263	7	2538
6	Göran Bjerendal	Sweden	1275	5	1247	12	2522
7	Marnix Vervinck	Belgium	1260	9	1259	8	2519
8	Gu Ja-cheong	South Korea	1226	28	1274	4	2500
9	Harry Wittig	West Germany	1231	21	1266	6	2497
10	Armin Garnreiter	West Germany	1235	16	1259	9	2494
11	Choi Won-tae	South Korea	1245	13	1245	16	2490
12	Glenn Meyers	United States	1246	12	1242	17	2488
13	Martinus Reniers	Netherlands	1247	11	1239	18	2486
14	Patrick De Koning	Belgium	1264	8	1222	27	2486
15	Detlef Kahlert	West Germany	1230	22	1256	10	2486
16	Suradi Rukimin	Indonesia	1268	6	1217	28	2485
17	Gerard Douis	France	1234	19	1251	11	2485
18	Ba Yongshan	China	1251	10	1232	21	2483
19	Gert Bjerendal	Sweden	1235	17	1246	14	2481
20	Thomas Hardmeier	Switzerland	1230	23	1246	15	2476
21	Steven Hallard	Great Britain	1235	18	1238	20	2473
22	Jeon In-su	South Korea	1228	25	1239	19	2467
23	Jan Roger Skyttesæter	Norway	1234	20	1231	23	2465
24	Andre Braun	Luxembourg	1227	26	1232	22	2459
25	Giancarlo Ferrari	Italy	1227	27	1228	24	2455
26	Willy van den Bossche	Belgium	1245	14	1209	33	2454
27	Tommy Quick	Sweden	1219	30	1228	25	2447
28	Kyösti Laasonen	Finland	1229	24	1214	29	2443
29	Ilario Di Buò	Italy	1190	40	1247	13	2437
30	Peter Gillam	Great Britain	1223	29	1212	32	2435
31	Christopher Blake	Australia	1245	15	1189	40	2434
32	Claude Rohla	Luxembourg	1217	32	1204	35	2421
33	Adolfo González	Mexico	1204	37	1214	30	2418
34	Dale Lightfoot	New Zealand	1191	39	1226	26	2417
35	Philippe Loyen	France	1206	36	1205	34	2411
36	Zhang Zheng	China	1207	35	1198	37	2405
37	Manuel Rubio	Spain	1213	33	1177	43	2390
38	Feng Zemin	China	1175	46	1214	31	2389
39	Gilles Cresto	Monaco	1209	34	1180	41	2389
40	Kemal Erer	Turkey	1190	41	1196	38	2386
41	Juan Echavarría	Colombia	1176	45	1203	36	2379
42	Tu Chih-chen	Chinese Taipei	1181	44	1195	39	2376
43	Donald Pandiangan	Indonesia	1218	31	1156	52	2374
44	Emilio Dutra e Mello	Brazil	1184	42	1179	42	2363
45	Izzet Avcı	Turkey	1193	38	1168	46	2361
46	Ampol Amaluktipituk	Thailand	1182	43	1160	50	2342
47	José Prieto	Spain	1167	50	1174	45	2341
48	Richard Priestman	Great Britain	1172	48	1167	47	2339
49	Markku Syrjälä	Finland	1157	51	1176	44	2333
50	Wachera Piyapattra	Thailand	1168	49	1160	51	2328
51	Rui Santos	Portugal	1173	47	1151	53	2324
52	Ichiro Shimamura	Japan	1148	52	1164	48	2312
53	Thinley Dorji	Bhutan	1134	53	1164	49	2298
54	Steve Yuen	Hong Kong	1129	54	1094	55	2223
55	Nawang Pelzang	Bhutan	1118	56	1103	54	2221
56	Lo Kam Kuen	Hong Kong	1121	55	1072	57	2193
57	Fok Ming Shan	Hong Kong	1077	57	1088	56	2165
58	Ismael Rivera	Puerto Rico	1042	58	1047	58	2089
59	Mansour Hamaid	Saudi Arabia	1024	59	974	61	1998
60	Lhendup Tshering	Bhutan	1021	60	976	60	1997
61	Faisal al Basam	Saudi Arabia	991	61	1002	59	1993
62	Youssef Jawdat	Saudi Arabia	880	62	836	62	1716
