= Archery at the 2010 Commonwealth Games – Women's recurve individual =

Women's recurve individual at the 2010 Commonwealth Games
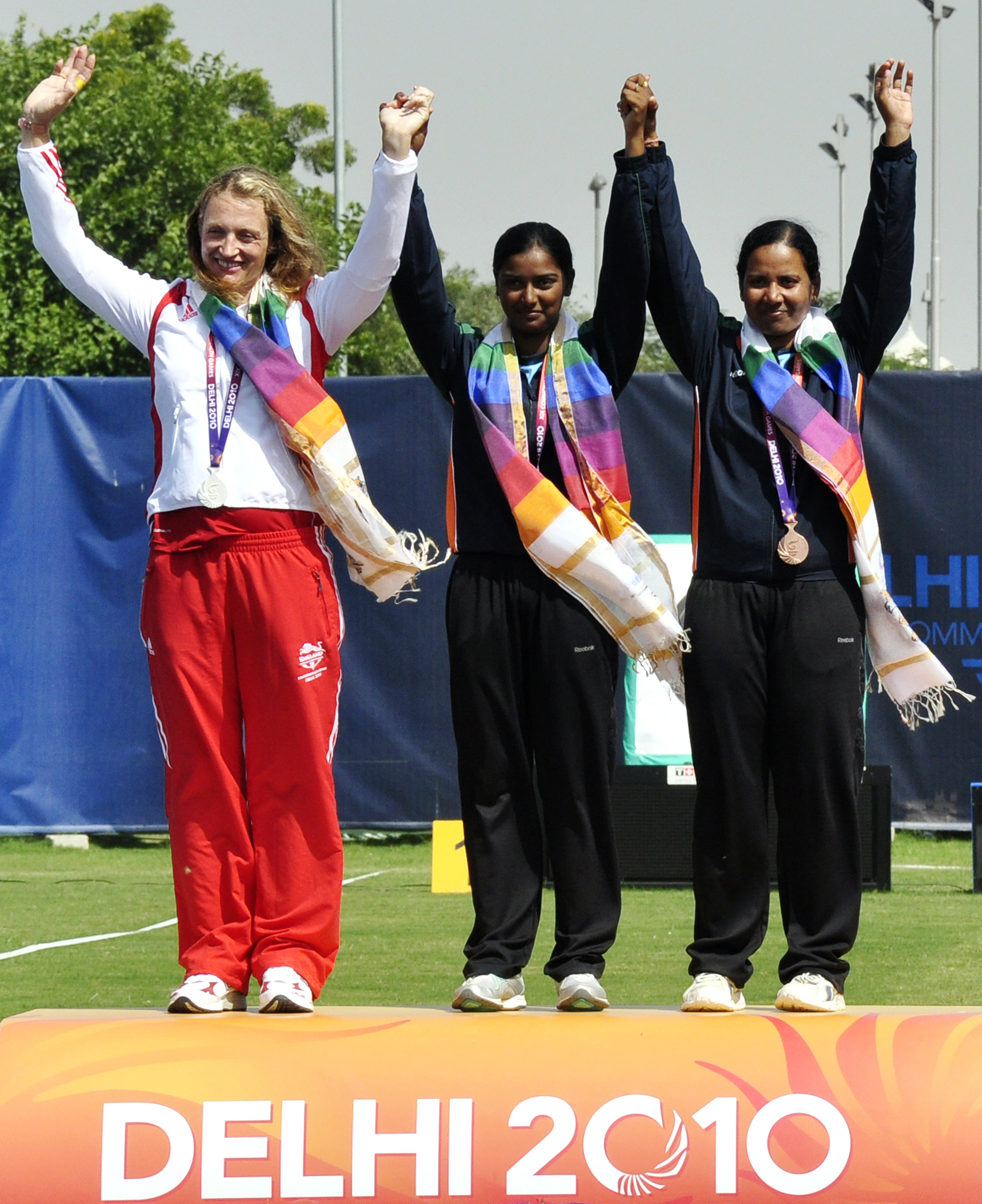
- Medalists Deepika Kumari (centre), Alison Williamson (left), and Dola Banerjee (right) during the medal presentation ceremony.
- Venue: Yamuna Sports Complex
- Dates: 4–10 October
- Competitors: 22 from 10 nations

Medalists
gold medal	Deepika Kumari	India
silver medal	Alison Williamson	England
bronze medal	Dola Banerjee	India

The women's recurve individual archery event at the 2010 Commonwealth Games was a competition held as part of the archery programme at the Yamuna Sports Complex in Delhi, India, from 4 October to 10 October 2010. It was the second time that the recurve individual event for women had been included in the Commonwealth Games and the first time it had been contested since the 1982 Games in Brisbane, Australia.

India's Deepika Kumari and Dola Banerjee won the gold and bronze medal respectively, with Alison Williamson of England winning the silver medal, all firsts for their nations in the women's recurve individual event.

== Background ==
A women's individual archery event had only taken place once before at the Commonwealth Games. As part of the 1982 Games held in Brisbane, Australia, a programme of two competitions using recurve bows took place over a four day period, with the women's individual event being held in parallel with a similar event for male archers. As one of sixteen designated optional commonwealth sports, archery's inclusion in a Commonwealth Games meeting is determined by the candidate host city on a Game-by-Game basis, subject to approval by the Executive Committee of the Commonwealth Games Federation. In 2006, India's Commonwealth Organising Committee was successful in its application to host individual and team archery events for its forthcoming Games in Delhi in 2010; the 28-year gap marked the longest period of absence for any returning Commonwealth sport. In addition to the men's and women's individual recurve events, six other archery competitions were approved — the men's and women's team recurve, and men's and women's individual and team compound events — each making their debut Commonwealth Games appearance.

22 competitors from 10 nations qualified for the event. Australia, Canada, England, Malaysia, Singapore, and host nation India each entered a full berth of three archers. Kenya, Mauritius, Scotland, and Sri Lanka each qualified one athlete. Of the entrants, eight were former Olympians: India's Dola Banerjee and Bombayla Devi Laishram, England's Naomi Folkard and Alison Williamson, Australia's Deonne Bridger and Alexandra Feeney, Canada's Marie-Pier Beaudet, and Veronique Marrier of Mauritius. Only Williamson entered as an Olympics medalist, having won bronze at the 2004 Games in Athens. India's Deepika Kumari, the reigning women's recurve individual youth champion, entered as the highest ranked athlete at world number 5.

Seven months before the competition began a four-day international test event was held at the Yamuna Sports Complex in March 2010 to evaluate the venue's preparedness ahead of the Games. Indian archers dominated the women's recurve individual competition, Kumari taking the gold medal in a five-set final ahead of teammates Chekrovolu Swuro and Pranitha Vardhineni, who finished with the silver and bronze medals respectively.

Two days after the opening ceremony in Delhi it was announced that all archery events were to be removed from the schedule of the succeeding 2014 Commonwealth Games in Glasgow due to time constraints. As of the 2022 Commonwealth Games, this remains the last time archery was contested at a Commonwealth Games.

== Format ==
An official FITA target is divided into ten evenly-spaced concentric rings. An arrow landing in the outermost ring wins one point; striking the centre yellow circle earns the maximum ten points.

The event was an outdoor target archery competition held under International Archery Federation (Fédération Internationale de Tir à l'Arc, FITA) rules, with each archer shooting at a 122 cm-wide target from a 70-metre distance. Between one and ten points were awarded for each arrow depending on how close it landed to the centre of the target.

The competition consisted of six stages. A 72-arrow ranking round took place on 4 October with the total cumulative score of each archer, out of a maximum of 720, used to determine the seedings for the five elimination rounds. The twelve athletes with the lowest total score from their 72 arrows advanced to the 1/16 elimination round, while the 10 highest scoring athletes received a bye to the 1/8 elimination round. If two or more athletes posted the same total score, the number of arrows landing in the 10 ring was taken into account. If the number of 10s was tied, then the number of arrows landing within the inner-10 ring (noted as Xs) was used as a tiebreaker.

A single elimination tournament consisting of five rounds followed, each round using the set system introduced by FITA earlier in 2010. A set consists of a total of six arrows, each archer shooting three arrows. The highest scoring archer from their three arrows earned two set points with the losing archer receiving zero points. In the event of a tied score both archers received one point. The 1/16 and 1/8 elimination rounds consisted of a maximum of three sets, with the first archer scoring four set points declared the winner, while the quarter-final, semifinal, and two medal-deciding matches consisted of up to five sets, the first archer to six set points winning the match. If the set points were tied after the maximum number of sets had been played, a single tie-breaker arrow was used, the archer shooting closest to centre of the target winning the match.

=== Schedule ===
The women's individual recurve began on 4 October with the ranking round, the results of which were also used to determine the seedings for the women's team recurve event. The first two elimination rounds took place the following day on 5 October, matches in the 1/16 and 1/8 elimination matches respectively taking place simultaneously. A break of four days then followed to allow the team recurve and the individual and team compound events to conclude. On the morning of 10 October the four quarter-final, two semifinal, and two medal matches were held in a staggered schedule each commencing thirteen minutes apart, the first quarter-final match beginning at 09:00, the first semifinal match at 09:52, and the gold medal match at 10:31. The medal presentation followed at 10:45.

The event was the seventh of the eight competitions on the archery schedule to conclude, the final rounds of the men's individual recurve following on the afternoon of 10 October.

Day	Date	Start Time	Round
Day 1	Monday, 4 October 2010	10:00	Ranking round
Day 2	Tuesday, 5 October 2010	09:00	1/16 eliminations
Day 2	Tuesday, 5 October 2010	09:40	1/8 eliminations
Day 7	Sunday, 10 October 2010	09:00	Quarter-finals
Day 7	Sunday, 10 October 2010	09:52	Semifinals
Day 7	Sunday, 10 October 2010	10:18	Bronze medal match
Day 7	Sunday, 10 October 2010	10:31	Gold medal match
All times are India Standard Time (UTC+05:30); Source:

== Venue ==
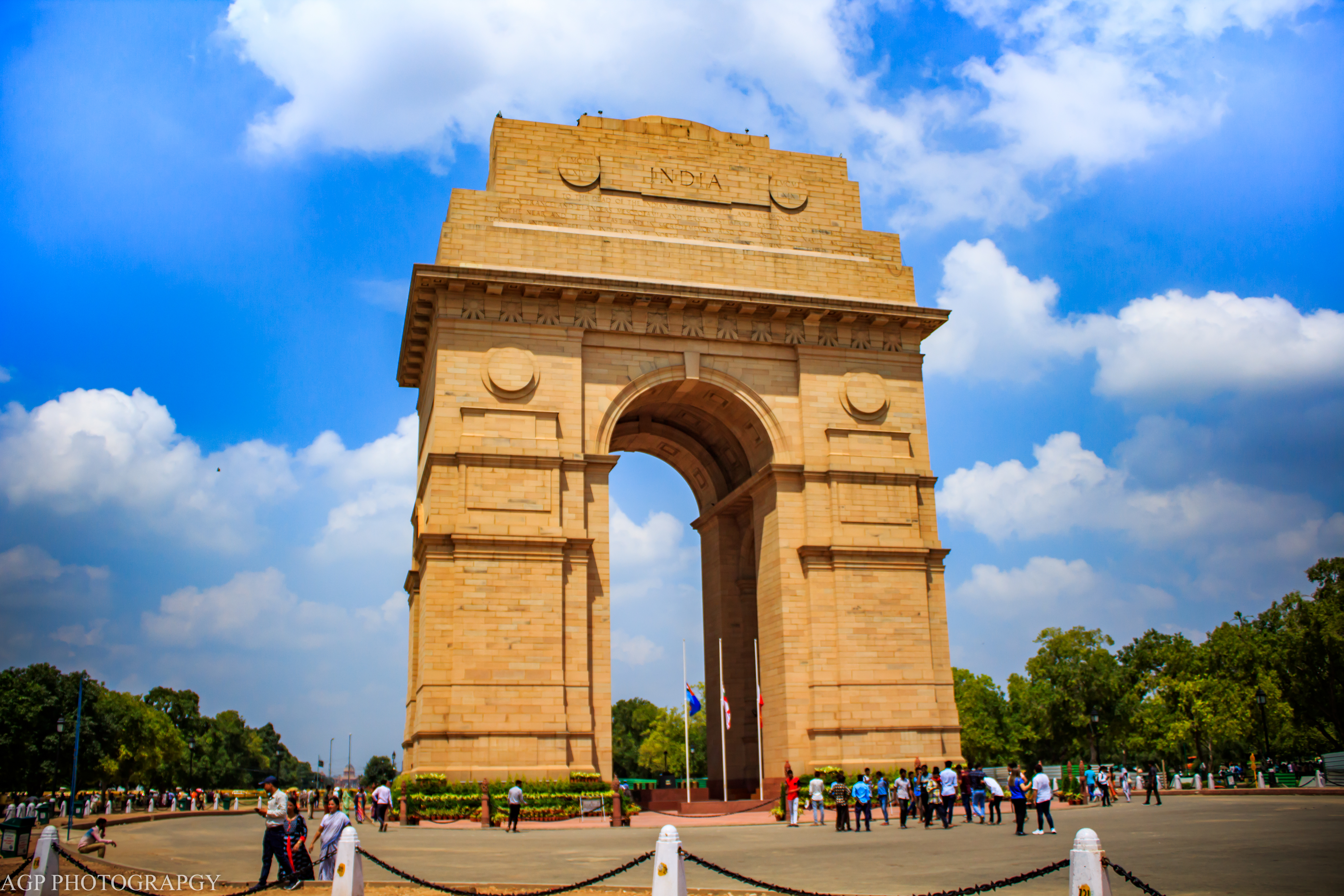
Plans to hold the final rounds of the competition at India Gate were abandoned for financial and security reasons.

All archery events took place at the Yamuna Sports Complex in a 1,500-seat outdoor facility constructed for the Games. Originally the complex was to host only the practice and ranking rounds, with the subsequent elimination rounds taking place within a temporary 3,000-seat facility on the lawns of India Gate in central Delhi. These plans were however abandoned in June 2010 after spiralling construction costs and the failure to obtain security clearance for the India Gate site due to its proximity with the centrepiece Jawaharlal Nehru Stadium.

== Records ==
- 70 metres - 72 arrow ranking round

	Archer	Score	Location	Date	Ref
World record	Park Sung-hyun (KOR)	682	Athens, Greece	12 August 2004	

At the time of the 2010 Commonwealth Games, South Korea's Park Sung-hyun held the world record for a 72-arrow total score shot from a 70-metre distance, shooting a total of 682 one day before the start of the 2004 Summer Olympics. Because the 2010 Games were the first to use the 72-arrow ranking round format at any stage of the competition, no existing Commonwealth record in this category had been set prior to this event.

== Report ==
Dola Banerjee was the pre-event favourite for the gold medal.

Strong winds made shooting difficult on the final day of competition. Banerjee blamed the blustery conditions on her semi-final defeat to sixth seed Alison Williamson, in which she surrendered a one-set lead with three successive set losses, losing 6-2. She would however come back from one set down to defeat Malaysia's Anbarasi Subramaniam in the bronze medal match after Subramaniam shot poorly in the fourth set. Williamson was joined by top seed Deepika Kumari in the final, who had failed to win just one set in the previous three matches, thereby guaranteeing a maiden women's individual recurve medal for both nations.

The final marked the third time Kumari and Williamson had met competitively. Kumari had won both of their previous match-ups, in the women's team recurve event two days prior and in the second stage of the Archery World Cup in Antalya, Turkey four months earlier. The match was a lop-sided affair, and in a performance described by The Hindu as "flawless", Kumari outshot the Englishwoman in a straight sets victory, scoring a maximum 30 points in the third set while Williamson faltered with a score of 7 on her last arrow. Kumari's win earned her a second Commonwealth gold medal in three days following India's victory in the women's team recurve event two days before, making her the most successful recurve archer at the Games. After her defeat Williamson praised Kumari's shooting and the behaviour of the home crowd, whose conduct in the women's team final had come under criticism by fellow English archer Amy Oliver for excessive volume and poor sportsmanship.

== Results ==
=== Ranking Round ===
Rank	Athlete	Half		Total	10s	Xs	Notes
Rank	Athlete	1st	2nd	Total	10s	Xs	Notes
1	Deepika Kumari (IND)	332	330	662	29	11	Advances to the 1/8 elimination round
2	Dola Banerjee (IND)	328	330	658	30	5	Advances to the 1/8 elimination round
3	Naomi Folkard (ENG)	318	324	642	20	6	Advances to the 1/8 elimination round
4	Deonne Bridger (AUS)	316	321	637	20	3	Advances to the 1/8 elimination round
5	Anbarasi Subramaniam (MAS)	315	322	637	19	4	Advances to the 1/8 elimination round
6	Alison Williamson (ENG)	328	307	635	21	4	Advances to the 1/8 elimination round
7	Amy Oliver (ENG)	315	312	627	19	4	Advances to the 1/8 elimination round
8	Alexandra Feeney (AUS)	311	314	625	12	3	Advances to the 1/8 elimination round
9	Laishram Bombayala Devi (IND)	311	313	624	20	7	Advances to the 1/8 elimination round
10	Alana Macdougall (CAN)	304	310	614	17	6	Advances to the 1/8 elimination round
11	Khang Cheok (SIN)	307	301	608	17	3	Advances to the 1/16 elimination round
12	Veronique Marrier (MRI)	302	306	608	13	5	Advances to the 1/16 elimination round
13	Vanessa Loh (SIN)	296	307	603	12	6	Advances to the 1/16 elimination round
14	Kateri Vrakking (CAN)	304	294	598	8	4	Advances to the 1/16 elimination round
15	Ng Sui Kim (MAS)	289	296	585	10	3	Advances to the 1/16 elimination round
16	Wendy Tan (SIN)	302	283	585	6	1	Advances to the 1/16 elimination round
17	Dilhara Salgado (SRI)	300	282	582	7	2	Advances to the 1/16 elimination round
18	Dawn Nelson (AUS)	295	284	579	8	4	Advances to the 1/16 elimination round
19	Lilian Downie (SCO)	287	287	574	13	3	Advances to the 1/16 elimination round
20	Marie-Pier Beaudet (CAN)	274	300	574	12	4	Advances to the 1/16 elimination round
21	Shahira Abdul (MAS)	286	283	569	7	1	Advances to the 1/16 elimination round
22	Shehzana Anwar (KEN)	279	238	517	5	1	Advances to the 1/16 elimination round

=== Elimination rounds ===
==== Top half ====
1/16 elimination
17	Dilhara Salgado (SRI)	2
16	Wendy Tan (SIN)	4
21	Shahira Abdul (MAS)	4
12	Veronique Marrier (MRI)	0
13	Vanessa Loh (SIN)	4
20	Marie-Pier Beaudet (CAN)	0

1/8 elimination
1	Deepika Kumari (IND)	4
16	Wendy Tan (SIN)	0
9	Laishram Bombayala Devi (IND)	2
8	Alexandra Feeney (AUS)	4
5	Anbarasi Subramaniam (MAS)	4
21	Shahira Abdul (MAS)	2
13	Vanessa Loh (SIN)	5
4	Deonne Bridger (AUS)	1

Quarter-finals
1	Deepika Kumari (IND)	6
8	Alexandra Feeney (AUS)	0
5	Anbarasi Subramaniam (MAS)	7
13	Vanessa Loh (SIN)	3

Semifinals
1	Deepika Kumari (IND)	7
5	Anbarasi Subramaniam (MAS)	1

==== Bottom half ====
1/16 elimination
19	Lilian Downie (SCO)	1
14	Kateri Vrakking (CAN)	5
11	Khang Cheok (SIN)	4
22	Shehzana Anwar (KEN)	0
15	Ng Sui Kim (MAS)	4
18	Dawn Nelson (AUS)	0

1/8 elimination
3	Naomi Folkard (ENG)	0
14	Kateri Vrakking (CAN)	4
11	Khang Cheok (SIN)	0
6	Alison Williamson (ENG)	4
7	Amy Oliver (ENG)	4
10	Alana Macdougall (CAN)	2
15	Ng Sui Kim (MAS)	2
2	Dola Banerjee (IND)	4

Quarter-finals
14	Kateri Vrakking (CAN)	0
6	Alison Williamson (ENG)	6
7	Amy Oliver (ENG)	2
2	Dola Banerjee (IND)	6

Semifinals
6	Alison Williamson (ENG)	6
2	Dola Banerjee (IND)	2

=== Finals ===
Gold medal match
1	Deepika Kumari (IND) (gold)	6
6	Alison Williamson (ENG) (silver)	0

Bronze medal match
2	Dola Banerjee (IND) (bronze)	6
5	Anbarasi Subramaniam (MAS)	2

== See also ==
- Women's individual recurve events:
  - Archery at the 2008 Summer Olympics – Women's individual
  - Archery at the 2010 Asian Games – Women's individual
  - Archery at the 2012 Summer Olympics – Women's individual
