= Dale Lightfoot =

Dale Lightfoot may refer to:

- Dale Lightfoot (archer) (born 1964), New Zealand archer
- Dale Lightfoot (geographer), American geographer
