= Zhang Zheng =

Zhang Zheng, may refer to:

- Zhang Zheng (archer) (born 1963), Chinese archer
- Zhang Zheng (politician) (born 1966), Chinese politician
- Zhang Zheng (admiral) (born 1969), rear admiral of the People's Liberation Army Navy
- Zhang Zheng (sledge hockey) (born 1998), Chinese sledge hockey player

== See also ==
- Zhangzheng, a town in Yinchuan, Ningxia, China
