= Liang Qiuzhong =

Chinese archer (born 1966)

Personal information
- Nationality: Chinese
- Born: 12 September 1966 (age 59)
- Height: 175 cm (5 ft 9 in)
- Weight: 73 kg (161 lb)

Sport
- Sport: Archery
Medal record
Men's recurve archery
Representing China
World Championships
Bronze medal – third place	1987 Adelaide	Team
Asian Games
Bronze medal – third place	1986 Seoul	Team

Liang Qiuzhong (Chinese: 梁秋仲, born 12 September 1966) is a Chinese archer. He competed in the men's individual and team events at the 1988 Summer Olympics.
