= Archery at the Asian Games =

- Governing bodies: WA (World) / WAA (Asia)
- Events: 10 (men: 4; women: 4; mixed: 2)

Games
- 1951; 1954; 1958; 1962; 1966; 1970; 1974; 1978; 1982; 1986; 1990; 1994; 1998; 2002; 2006; 2010; 2014; 2018; 2022; 2026
- Medalists; Records

Archery has been an event at the Asian Games since 1978 in Bangkok, Thailand.

== Editions ==
Games	Year	Host city	Best nation
VIII	1978	Bangkok, Thailand	Japan
IX	1982	New Delhi, India	South Korea
X	1986	Seoul, South Korea	South Korea
XI	1990	Beijing, China	South Korea
XII	1994	Hiroshima, Japan	South Korea
XIII	1998	Bangkok, Thailand	South Korea
XIV	2002	Busan, South Korea	South Korea
XV	2006	Doha, Qatar	South Korea
XVI	2010	Guangzhou, China	South Korea
XVII	2014	Incheon, South Korea	South Korea
XVIII	2018	Jakarta, Indonesia	South Korea
XIX	2022	Hangzhou, China	India
XX	2026	Okazaki, Japan	India

== Events ==
Event	78	82	86	90	94	98	02	06	10	14	18	22	26	Years
Recurve
Men's individual	X	X	X	X	X	X	X	X	X	X	X	X	X	13
Men's individual 30 m			X											1
Men's individual 50 m			X											1
Men's individual 70 m			X											1
Men's individual 90 m			X											1
Men's team	X	X	X	X	X	X	X	X	X	X	X	X	X	13
Women's individual	X	X	X	X	X	X	X	X	X	X	X	X	X	13
Women's individual 30 m			X											1
Women's individual 50 m			X											1
Women's individual 60 m			X											1
Women's individual 70 m			X											1
Women's team	X	X	X	X	X	X	X	X	X	X	X	X	X	13
Mixed team											X	X	X	3
Compound
Men's individual										X		X	X	3
Men's team										X	X	X	X	4
Women's individual										X		X	X	3
Women's team										X	X	X	X	4
Mixed team											X	X	X	3
Total	4	4	12	4	4	4	4	4	4	8	8	10	10	80

== Medal table ==
As of 2026 edition

Rank	Nation	Gold	Silver	Bronze	Total
1	South Korea (KOR)	49	32	22	103
2	India (IND)	11	8	9	28
3	Japan (JPN)	8	11	8	27
4	China (CHN)	5	13	15	33
5	Chinese Taipei (TPE)	3	9	10	22
6	Indonesia (INA)	1	3	4	8
7	North Korea (PRK)	1	2	4	7
8	Iran (IRI)	1	0	2	3
9	Mongolia (MGL)	1	0	0	1
10	Malaysia (MAS)	0	1	2	3
11	Philippines (PHI)	0	1	1	2
12	Kazakhstan (KAZ)	0	0	3	3
Totals (12 entries)		80	80	80	240
