= Ru Guang =

Chinese archer (born 1955)

Personal information
- Nationality: Chinese
- Born: 1 November 1955 (age 70)
- Height: 170 cm (5 ft 7 in)
- Weight: 64 kg (141 lb)

Sport
- Sport: Archery
Medal record
Men's recurve archery
Representing China
World Championships
Bronze medal – third place	1987 Adelaide	Team
Asian Games
Bronze medal – third place	1982 New Delhi	Team
Bronze medal – third place	1986 Seoul	Team

Ru Guang (Chinese: 汝光, born 1 November 1955) is a Chinese archer. He competed in the men's individual and team events at the 1988 Summer Olympics.
