= Archery at the 2010 Asian Games – Women's individual =

Women's individual recurve at the 2010 Asian Games
- Venue: Aoti Archery Range
- Dates: 19–23 November 2010
- Competitors: 52 from 16 nations

Medalists
gold medal	Yun Ok-hee	South Korea
silver medal	Cheng Ming	China
bronze medal	Kwon Un-sil	North Korea

The women's individual recurve archery competition at the 2010 Asian Games in Guangzhou was held from 19 November to 23 November at Aoti Archery Range.

== Schedule ==
All times are China Standard Time (UTC+08:00)

Date	Time	Event
Friday, 19 November 2010	09:00	Qualification round
Tuesday, 23 November 2010	09:00	1/16 eliminations
Tuesday, 23 November 2010	09:30	1/8 eliminations
Tuesday, 23 November 2010	14:30	1/4 eliminations
Tuesday, 23 November 2010	15:30	Semifinals
Tuesday, 23 November 2010	16:00	Bronze medal match
Tuesday, 23 November 2010	16:15	Gold medal match

== Results ==
=== Qualification round ===
Rank	Seed	Athlete	Distance				Total	10s	Xs
Rank	Seed	Athlete	70m	60m	50m	30m	Total	10s	Xs
1	1	Yun Ok-hee (KOR)	334	345	338	354	1371	83	33
2	2	Ki Bo-bae (KOR)	335	342	338	353	1368	81	38
3	3	Kwon Un-sil (PRK)	332	343	330	352	1357	81	20
4	—	Joo Hyun-jung (KOR)	328	339	328	353	1348	76	24
5	—	Kim Mun-joung (KOR)	322	331	330	355	1338	63	23
6	4	Tan Ya-ting (TPE)	314	337	333	350	1334	68	31
7	5	Deepika Kumari (IND)	326	333	323	347	1329	64	17
8	6	Lei Chien-ying (TPE)	320	337	320	350	1327	66	29
9	7	Cheng Ming (CHN)	317	334	327	347	1325	56	25
10	8	Farida Tukebayeva (KAZ)	320	330	321	352	1323	60	22
11	9	Zhang Yunlu (CHN)	316	336	324	347	1323	57	23
12	—	Yang Jianping (CHN)	325	336	312	347	1320	59	20
13	10	Ika Yuliana Rochmawati (INA)	329	329	311	350	1319	60	19
14	—	Yuan Shu-chi (TPE)	324	335	315	345	1319	58	17
15	11	Sayami Matsushita (JPN)	322	331	316	340	1309	60	23
16	—	Wu Hui-ju (TPE)	310	328	320	350	1308	58	15
17	12	Ayaka Saito (JPN)	307	329	324	339	1299	47	16
18	13	Rimil Buriuly (IND)	309	325	319	345	1298	47	18
19	14	Choe Song-hui (PRK)	314	330	311	343	1298	46	18
20	—	Zhu Shanshan (CHN)	311	323	313	346	1293	51	19
21	15	Narisara Tinbua (THA)	313	327	311	342	1293	45	11
22	—	Yuki Hayashi (JPN)	307	326	314	343	1290	48	14
23	16	Chuluunbaataryn Mönkhtsetseg (MGL)	303	317	321	347	1288	54	25
24	17	Bishindeegiin Urantungalag (MGL)	320	319	312	337	1288	44	13
25	—	Olga Pilipova (KAZ)	318	328	312	329	1287	31	6
26	—	Ri Un-ok (PRK)	319	315	316	335	1285	46	21
27	—	Ryu Un-hyang (PRK)	311	325	300	340	1276	46	16
28	—	Bombayla Devi Laishram (IND)	320	321	296	333	1270	45	12
29	—	Dola Banerjee (IND)	313	313	296	342	1264	45	17
30	—	Chuluuny Oyunsüren (MGL)	304	322	299	339	1264	43	11
31	—	Yelena Li (KAZ)	300	326	298	339	1263	45	15
32	18	Nguyễn Thị Hương (VIE)	298	313	302	348	1261	37	9
33	—	Kaori Kawanaka (JPN)	303	306	307	342	1258	43	11
34	19	Anastassiya Bannova (KAZ)	285	320	309	340	1254	40	10
35	20	Zahra Dehghan (IRI)	294	323	306	330	1253	39	12
36	21	Erwina Safitri (INA)	309	317	286	334	1246	34	10
37	—	Rina Dewi Puspitasari (INA)	280	321	297	343	1241	45	12
38	22	Zuhro Tagoeva (TJK)	287	312	299	338	1236	34	13
39	23	Zahra Shams (IRI)	285	306	301	341	1233	43	20
40	24	Firuza Zubaydova (TJK)	294	299	298	335	1226	28	6
41	—	Nuraini Novia (INA)	261	301	312	339	1213	37	17
42	25	Mathui Prue Marma (BAN)	285	295	287	340	1207	32	9
43	26	Dilhara Salgado (SRI)	290	288	287	330	1195	28	7
44	—	Afrouzeh Molavi (IRI)	281	307	275	329	1192	28	6
45	27	Nguyễn Trà My (VIE)	267	288	289	333	1177	31	12
46	—	Fotima Tagoeva (TJK)	270	288	281	312	1151	23	8
47	28	Rand Saad (IRQ)	250	296	279	322	1147	19	9
48	29	Beauty Ray (BAN)	255	306	250	313	1124	27	10
49	—	Leila Sakhaeifar (IRI)	250	276	281	307	1114	26	10
50	—	Nguyễn Thị Kiều Trang (VIE)	205	269	233	309	1016	16	7
51	30	Shashikala Kumarasinghe (SRI)	230	244	251	290	1015	10	2
52	—	Najmin Khatun (BAN)	276	264	200	263	1003	10	4

=== Knockout round ===
==== Finals ====
Semifinals
1	Yun Ok-hee (KOR)	27	28	27	30	6
5	Deepika Kumari (IND)	24	27	29	29	2
3	Kwon Un-sil (PRK)	27	28	27	25	1
7	Cheng Ming (CHN)	28	28	29	28	7

Gold medal match
1	Yun Ok-hee (KOR)	27	28	28	6
7	Cheng Ming (CHN)	25	27	27	2
Bronze medal match
5	Deepika Kumari (IND)	25	26	29	26	2
3	Kwon Un-sil (PRK)	27	28	26	28	6

==== Section 1 ====
1/16 eliminations
17	Bishindeegiin Urantungalag (MGL)	54	53	4
16	Chuluunbaataryn Mönkhtsetseg (MGL)	52	48	0
9	Zhang Yunlu (CHN)	50	56	53	4
24	Firuza Zubaydova (TJK)	54	50	46	2
25	Mathui Prue Marma (BAN)	46	49	0
8	Farida Tukebayeva (KAZ)	54	55	4

1/8 eliminations
1	Yun Ok-hee (KOR)	27	29	28	6
17	Bishindeegiin Urantungalag (MGL)	21	27	23	0
9	Zhang Yunlu (CHN)	27	28	27	27	1
8	Farida Tukebayeva (KAZ)	28	28	28	28	7

1/4 eliminations
1	Yun Ok-hee (KOR)	26	29	28	29	29	7
8	Farida Tukebayeva (KAZ)	28	28	28	27	27	3

==== Section 2 ====
1/16 eliminations
5	Deepika Kumari (IND)	56	49	54	5
28	Rand Saad (IRQ)	46	49	46	1
21	Erwina Safitri (INA)	51	53	4
12	Ayaka Saito (JPN)	47	50	0
13	Rimil Buriuly (IND)	49	48	4
20	Zahra Dehghan (IRI)	47	46	0
29	Beauty Ray (BAN)	40	52	0
4	Tan Ya-ting (TPE)	57	59	4

1/8 eliminations
5	Deepika Kumari (IND)	26	26	27	30	26	7
21	Erwina Safitri (INA)	28	26	24	28	22	3
13	Rimil Buriuly (IND)	22	21	28	25	2
4	Tan Ya-ting (TPE)	27	27	27	26	6

1/4 eliminations
5	Deepika Kumari (IND)	26	28	28	28	29	6
4	Tan Ya-ting (TPE)	29	26	29	27	28	4

==== Section 3 ====
1/16 eliminations
3	Kwon Un-sil (PRK)	56	56	4
30	Shashikala Kumarasinghe (SRI)	45	41	0
19	Anastassiya Bannova (KAZ)	52	56	46	2
14	Choe Song-hui (PRK)	54	54	50	4
11	Sayami Matsushita (JPN)	51	51	51	4
22	Zuhro Tagoeva (TJK)	52	49	43	2
27	Nguyễn Trà My (VIE)	49	54	44	1
6	Lei Chien-ying (TPE)	56	54	51	5

1/8 eliminations
3	Kwon Un-sil (PRK)	25	27	28	24	28	7
14	Choe Song-hui (PRK)	25	24	27	25	27	3
11	Sayami Matsushita (JPN)	28	28	29	27	7
6	Lei Chien-ying (TPE)	24	28	28	26	1

1/4 eliminations
3	Kwon Un-sil (PRK)	28	24	26	29	6
11	Sayami Matsushita (JPN)	27	25	25	24	2

==== Section 4 ====
1/16 eliminations
7	Cheng Ming (CHN)	56	58	4
26	Dilhara Salgado (SRI)	34	47	0
23	Zahra Shams (IRI)	53	48	49	2
10	Ika Yuliana Rochmawati (INA)	50	53	54	4
15	Narisara Tinbua (THA)	53	57	50	2
18	Nguyễn Thị Hương (VIE)	54	50	52	4

1/8 eliminations
7	Cheng Ming (CHN)	26	26	28	25	29	7
10	Ika Yuliana Rochmawati (INA)	26	26	25	25	25	3
18	Nguyễn Thị Hương (VIE)	26	21	25	0
2	Ki Bo-bae (KOR)	28	26	30	6

1/4 eliminations
7	Cheng Ming (CHN)	28	28	30	28	27	6
2	Ki Bo-bae (KOR)	28	28	29	28	27	4
