= Archery at the 1986 Asian Games =

- Venue: Hwarang Archery Field
- Dates: 27–30 September 1986

Archery was competed at the 1986 Asian Games in Seoul, South Korea from 27 to 30 September. The competition included only recurve events.

== Medalists ==
=== Men ===
| Event | Gold | Silver | Bronze |
|---|---|---|---|
| Individual | Takayoshi Matsushita; Japan | Yang Chang-hoon; South Korea | Koo Ja-chung; South Korea |
| Individual 30 m | Yang Chang-hoon; South Korea | Koo Ja-chung; South Korea | Chun In-soo; South Korea |
| Individual 50 m | Yang Chang-hoon; South Korea | Takayoshi Matsushita; Japan | Hiroshi Yamamoto; Japan |
| Individual 70 m | Yang Chang-hoon; South Korea | Koo Ja-chung; South Korea | Chun In-soo; South Korea |
| Individual 90 m | Takayoshi Matsushita; Japan | Koo Ja-chung; South Korea | Chun In-soo; South Korea |
| Team | South Korea; Chun In-soo; Koo Ja-chung; Park Kyung-sang; Yang Chang-hoon | Japan; Tokuyuki Kawai; Takayoshi Matsushita; Ichiro Shimamura; Hiroshi Yamamoto | China; Cao Ling; Duan Hongjun; Liang Qiuzhong; Ru Guang |

=== Women ===
| Event | Gold | Silver | Bronze |
|---|---|---|---|
| Individual | Park Jung-ah; South Korea | Kim Jin-ho; South Korea | Kim Mi-ja; South Korea |
| Individual 30 m | Kim Jin-ho; South Korea | Park Jung-ah; South Korea | Kim Mi-ja; South Korea |
| Individual 50 m | Park Jung-ah; South Korea | Kim Mi-ja; South Korea | Ma Xiangjun; China |
| Individual 60 m | Kim Jin-ho; South Korea | Park Jung-ah; South Korea | Akiko Kodama; Japan |
| Individual 70 m | Ma Xiangjun; China | Kim Jin-ho; South Korea | Park Jung-ah; South Korea |
| Team | South Korea; Kim Jin-ho; Kim Mi-ja; Lee Seon-hee; Park Jung-ah | China; Li Renfeng; Ma Shaorong; Ma Xiangjun; Yao Yawen | Japan; Hiroko Ishizu; Akiko Kodama; Masayo Shibata; Keiko Suwa |

== Medal table ==
| Rank | Nation | Gold | Silver | Bronze | Total |
|---|---|---|---|---|---|
| 1 | South Korea (KOR) | 9 | 9 | 7 | 25 |
| 2 | Japan (JPN) | 2 | 2 | 3 | 7 |
| 3 | China (CHN) | 1 | 1 | 2 | 4 |
| Totals (3 entries) | | 12 | 12 | 12 | 36 |
