= Shashikala Kumarasinghe =

Sri Lankan archer (born 1984)

Personal information
- Nationality: Sri Lankan
- Born: 1983

Sport
- Country: Sri Lanka
- Sport: Archery
- Club: Colombo Archery Club

Harshani Shashikala Kumarasinghe (born 1984) is a Sri Lankan archer. She competed at the 2010 Asian Games in the archery event.

Shashikala Kumarasinghe also returned to represent the national archery team in an international competition after 7 years by participating in the 2016 South Asian Games.

== See also ==
- Sri Lanka at the 2010 Asian Games
- Archery at the 2010 Asian Games
