= Archery at the 2006 Asian Games – Men's individual =

Men's individual recurve at the 2006 Asian Games
- Venue: Lusail Archery Range
- Dates: 9–12 December 2006
- Competitors: 59 from 20 nations

Medalists
gold medal	Im Dong-hyun	South Korea
silver medal	Tomokazu Wakino	Japan
bronze medal	Kuo Cheng-wei	Chinese Taipei

The men's individual recurve competition at the 2006 Asian Games in Doha, Qatar was held from 9 to 12 December at the Lusail Archery Range.

== Schedule ==
All times are Arabia Standard Time (UTC+03:00)

Date	Time	Event
Saturday, 9 December 2006	13:30	Qualification 90/70 m
Sunday, 10 December 2006	13:15	Qualification 50/30 m
Tuesday, 12 December 2006	09:45	1/16 round
Tuesday, 12 December 2006	10:30	1/8 round
Tuesday, 12 December 2006	11:15	Quarterfinals
Tuesday, 12 December 2006	13:00	Semifinals
Tuesday, 12 December 2006	14:20	Bronze medal match
Tuesday, 12 December 2006	14:50	Final

== Results ==
=== Qualification ===
Rank	Seed	Athlete	Distance				Total	10s	Xs
Rank	Seed	Athlete	90m	70m	50m	30m	Total	10s	Xs
1	1	Im Dong-hyun (KOR)	308	333	335	356	1332	72	28
2	2	Park Kyung-mo (KOR)	301	330	343	356	1330	78	36
3	—	Jang Yong-ho (KOR)	305	327	332	357	1321	67	32
4	—	Lee Chang-hwan (KOR)	286	330	340	356	1312	63	30
5	3	Yong Fujun (CHN)	307	323	329	351	1310	59	23
6	4	Kuo Cheng-wei (TPE)	294	328	337	348	1307	61	33
7	5	Cheng Chu Sian (MAS)	297	317	338	351	1303	60	29
8	6	Mangal Singh Champia (IND)	299	305	340	356	1300	64	20
9	7	Rahmat Sulistyawan (INA)	279	326	331	353	1289	54	23
10	8	Jayanta Talukdar (IND)	286	315	334	352	1287	57	22
11	—	Tarundeep Rai (IND)	294	321	322	349	1286	56	19
12	9	Wang Gang (CHN)	287	322	330	346	1285	57	22
13	10	Chen Szu-yuan (TPE)	289	319	331	346	1285	55	23
14	—	Wang Cheng-pang (TPE)	283	319	329	352	1283	64	27
15	11	Tomokazu Wakino (JPN)	294	315	327	346	1282	46	14
16	—	Li Wenquan (CHN)	284	324	317	351	1276	51	22
17	12	Ryuichi Moriya (JPN)	277	320	330	347	1274	49	26
18	13	Marvin Cordero (PHI)	277	316	330	349	1272	49	18
19	—	Hsu Tzu-yi (TPE)	283	309	329	349	1270	53	22
20	14	Marbawi Sulaiman (MAS)	282	318	323	341	1264	46	21
21	15	Igor Kovalev (KAZ)	274	313	325	351	1263	52	14
22	—	Vishwas (IND)	267	314	332	349	1262	49	14
23	—	Jing Xiangqing (CHN)	272	310	323	353	1258	52	18
24	16	Sergey Khristich (KAZ)	257	320	329	344	1250	50	23
25	—	Oibek Saidiyev (KAZ)	260	312	326	351	1249	45	18
26	17	Mark Javier (PHI)	262	309	329	348	1248	44	22
27	18	Jarun Thiangprasert (THA)	262	310	325	348	1245	48	20
28	—	Paul Dela Cruz (PHI)	246	310	324	351	1231	45	18
29	—	Wan Khalmizam (MAS)	267	307	319	338	1231	42	15
30	—	Christian Cubilla (PHI)	258	306	319	342	1225	34	13
31	—	Satoshi Kanemura (JPN)	273	294	305	344	1216	34	14
32	19	Ali Ahmed Salem (QAT)	249	304	319	342	1214	41	12
33	20	Amet Umerov (UZB)	262	284	322	341	1209	38	13
34	21	Zaw Win Htike (MYA)	253	290	325	336	1204	39	15
35	—	Chiaki Hashimoto (JPN)	261	293	304	341	1199	35	12
36	22	Rinchen Gyeltshen (BHU)	253	294	311	338	1196	34	11
37	23	Tashi Peljor (BHU)	268	284	302	338	1192	34	9
38	—	Dulat Medeuov (KAZ)	243	291	316	339	1189	37	10
39	24	Ahmed Al-Abadi (QAT)	252	291	307	331	1181	28	8
40	—	Chencho Dorji (BHU)	256	280	295	338	1169	24	9
41	25	Dambadondogiin Baatarjav (MGL)	228	297	303	339	1167	34	8
42	—	Farhan Monser (QAT)	239	279	318	331	1167	33	9
43	26	Kyaw Lin Tun (MYA)	250	281	301	328	1160	25	5
44	27	Manuja Kodikara (SRI)	246	279	307	327	1159	23	8
45	28	Tsogtyn Badamkhatan (MGL)	242	275	301	332	1150	24	8
46	—	Myo Ko Ko (MYA)	234	289	284	339	1146	35	15
47	—	Nazrin Aizad (MAS)	219	294	297	335	1145	32	8
48	29	Chan Kam Shing (HKG)	228	272	304	341	1145	31	12
49	—	Jantsangiin Gantögs (MGL)	245	282	281	333	1141	24	7
50	30	Patrick Ma (HKG)	228	277	292	332	1129	26	10
51	31	Ali Mohammed (IRQ)	216	282	292	332	1122	29	8
52	—	Muk Hau Tak (HKG)	213	256	311	330	1110	24	10
53	—	Kyaw Chan Nyein (MYA)	197	273	297	337	1104	24	10
54	—	Israf Khan (QAT)	214	279	285	323	1101	19	9
55	—	Byadrangiin Lkhagvasüren (MGL)	204	246	301	333	1084	29	11
56	—	Tashi Dorji (BHU)	199	250	293	328	1070	24	8
57	32	Alexander Berdugin (KGZ)	186	256	269	325	1036	22	9
58	—	Gary Chan (HKG)	204	248	251	308	1011	15	4
59	33	Bilal Jizini (LIB)	135	244	266	312	957	12	4

=== Knockout round ===
==== Finals ====
Final
1	Im Dong-hyun (KOR)	108
11	Tomokazu Wakino (JPN)	101

Bronze medal match
4	Kuo Cheng-wei (TPE)	109
7	Rahmat Sulistyawan (INA)	100

==== Top half ====
1/16 round
1	Im Dong-hyun (KOR)	108
32	Alexander Berdugin (KGZ)	81
17	Mark Javier (PHI)	99
16	Sergey Khristich (KAZ)	95
9	Wang Gang (CHN)	110
24	Ahmed Al-Abadi (QAT)	100
25	Dambadondogiin Baatarjav (MGL)	93
8	Jayanta Talukdar (IND)	98
5	Cheng Chu Sian (MAS)	100
28	Tsogtyn Badamkhatan (MGL)	86
21	Zaw Win Htike (MYA)	90
12	Ryuichi Moriya (JPN)	99
13	Marvin Cordero (PHI)	96
20	Amet Umerov (UZB)	72
29	Chan Kam Shing (HKG)	88
4	Kuo Cheng-wei (TPE)	102

1/8 round
1	Im Dong-hyun (KOR)	113
17	Mark Javier (PHI)	104
9	Wang Gang (CHN)	108
8	Jayanta Talukdar (IND)	102
5	Cheng Chu Sian (MAS)	109
12	Ryuichi Moriya (JPN)	97
13	Marvin Cordero (PHI)	97
4	Kuo Cheng-wei (TPE)	106

Quarterfinals
1	Im Dong-hyun (KOR)	109
9	Wang Gang (CHN)	104
5	Cheng Chu Sian (MAS)	108
4	Kuo Cheng-wei (TPE)	114

Semifinals
1	Im Dong-hyun (KOR)	106
4	Kuo Cheng-wei (TPE)	100

==== Bottom half ====
1/16 round
3	Yong Fujun (CHN)	90
30	Patrick Ma (HKG)	82
19	Ali Ahmed Salem (QAT)	81^{5}
14	Marbawi Sulaiman (MAS)	81^{9}
11	Tomokazu Wakino (JPN)	95
22	Rinchen Gyeltshen (BHU)	86
27	Manuja Kodikara (SRI)	79
6	Mangal Singh Champia (IND)	89
7	Rahmat Sulistyawan (INA)	89
26	Kyaw Lin Tun (MYA)	70
23	Tashi Peljor (BHU)	91
10	Chen Szu-yuan (TPE)	102
15	Igor Kovalev (KAZ)	96
18	Jarun Thiangprasert (THA)	77
31	Ali Mohammed (IRQ)	69
2	Park Kyung-mo (KOR)	92

1/8 round
3	Yong Fujun (CHN)	99
14	Marbawi Sulaiman (MAS)	97
11	Tomokazu Wakino (JPN)	102
6	Mangal Singh Champia (IND)	98
7	Rahmat Sulistyawan (INA)	102^{9}
10	Chen Szu-yuan (TPE)	102^{8}
15	Igor Kovalev (KAZ)	99
2	Park Kyung-mo (KOR)	107

Quarterfinals
3	Yong Fujun (CHN)	104
11	Tomokazu Wakino (JPN)	106
7	Rahmat Sulistyawan (INA)	105
2	Park Kyung-mo (KOR)	100

Semifinals
11	Tomokazu Wakino (JPN)	100
7	Rahmat Sulistyawan (INA)	82
