= Hardmeier =

Hardmeier or Hardmeyer is a surname. Notable people include:

- Anny Rüegg-Hardmeier (1912–2011), Swiss alpine skier
- Eric Hardmeyer (born 1959), American CEO
- Oskar Hardmeier (born 1925), Swiss sprinter
- Thomas Hardmeier (archer) (born 1963), Swiss archer
- Thomas Hardmeier (born 1965), Swiss cinematographer
