= Armin Garnreiter =

German archer (born 1958)

Personal information
- Nationality: German
- Born: 24 July 1958 (age 67) Burghausen, West Germany

Sport
- Sport: Archery

Armin Garnreiter (born 24 July 1958) is a German archer. He competed in the men's individual event at the 1984 Summer Olympics.
