= Ismael Rivera (archer) =

Puerto Rican archer (born 1951)

Personal information
- Nationality: Puerto Rican
- Born: 7 July 1951 (age 73)

Sport
- Sport: Archery

Ismael Rivera (born 7 July 1951) is a Puerto Rican archer. He competed in the men's individual event at the 1984 Summer Olympics.
