= Kemal Erer =

Turkish archer (born 1948)

Personal information
- Nationality: Turkish
- Born: 2 March 1948 (age 77); Ankara, Turkey

Sport
- Sport: Archery

Kemal Erer (born 2 March 1948) is a Turkish archer. He competed in the men's individual event at the 1984 Summer Olympics.
