= José Prieto (archer) =

Spanish archer (born 1946)

Personal information
- Nationality: Spanish
- Born: 24 April 1946 (age 78); Huelva, Spain

Sport
- Sport: Archery

José Prieto (born 24 April 1946) is a Spanish archer. He competed in the men's individual event at the 1984 Summer Olympics.
