= Cheng Ming =

Chinese archer (born 1986)

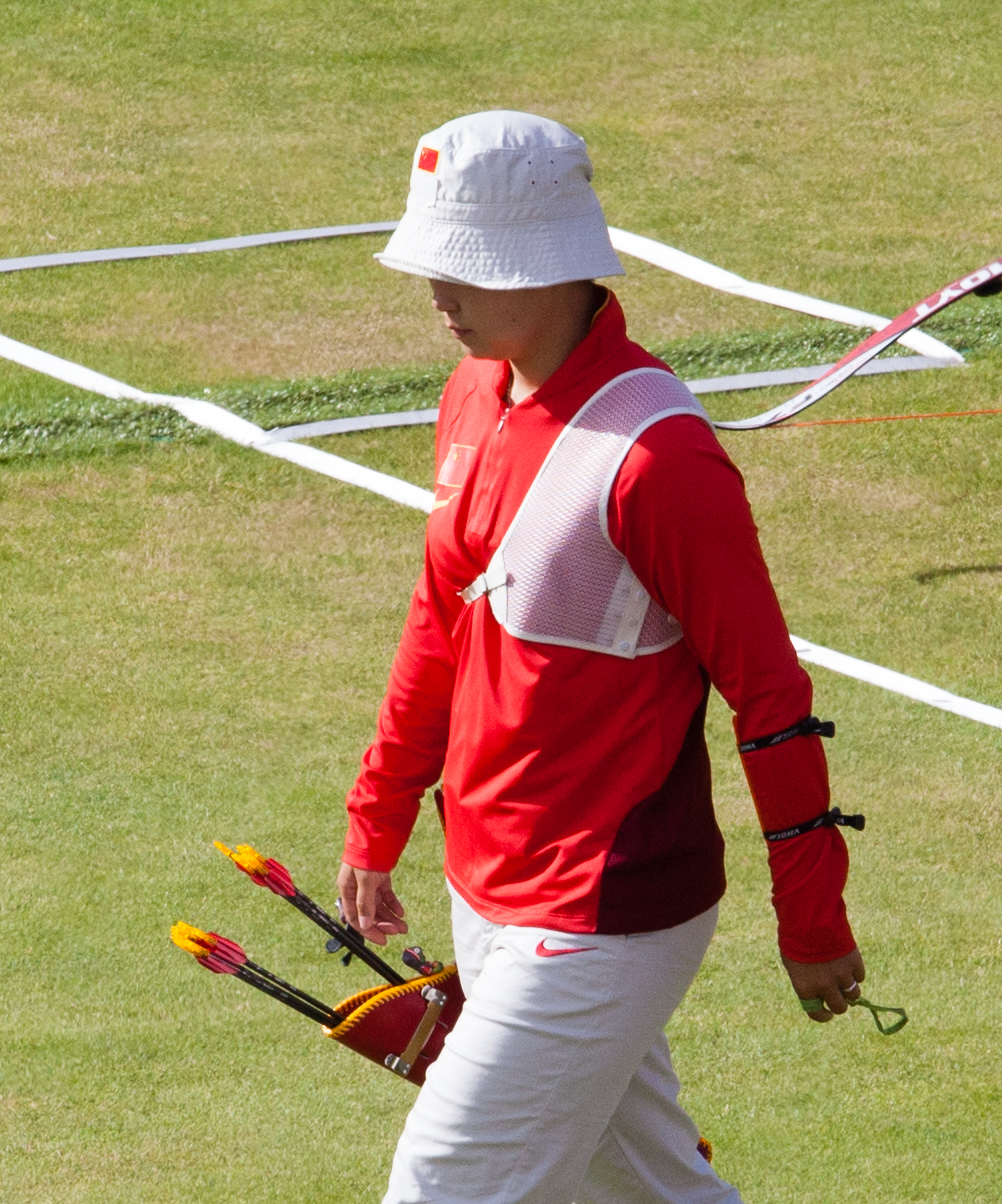
- Cheng at the 2012 Summer Olympics

Personal information
- Born: February 11, 1986 (age 40) Jilin City, China
- Height: 165 cm (5 ft 5 in)
- Weight: 65 kg (143 lb)
Medal record
Women's recurve archery
Representing China
Olympic Games
Silver medal – second place	2012 London	Team
World Cup
Gold medal – first place	2011 Istanbul	Individual
Silver medal – second place	2014 Lausanne	Individual
Asian Games
Silver medal – second place	2010 Guangzhou	Individual
Silver medal – second place	2010 Guangzhou	Team
Silver medal – second place	2014 Incheon	Team

Cheng Ming (Chinese: 程明; pinyin: Chéng Míng; born February 11, 1986, in Jilin City, China) is a Chinese archer. At the 2012 Summer Olympics she competed for her country in the Women's team event, where China won the silver medal, and the individual event, reaching the third round where she was knocked out by Khatuna Lorig.

== See also ==
- China at the 2012 Summer Olympics
