= Archery at the 2010 Asian Games =

- Venue: Aoti Archery Range
- Dates: 19–24 November 2010
- Competitors: 114 from 21 nations

Archery at the 2010 Asian Games was held in Aoti Archery Range, Guangzhou, China.

Men and women competed in both individual and team events in recurve with all competition taking place from November 19 to 24, 2010. South Korean won all four gold medals.

== Schedule ==
R	Ranking round	F	Elimination rounds & Finals

Event↓/Date →	19th Fri	20th Sat	21st Sun	22nd Mon	23rd Tue	24th Wed
Men's individual		R				F
Men's team		R		F		
Women's individual	R				F	
Women's team	R		F			

== Medalists ==
Event	Gold	Silver	Bronze
Men's individual	Kim Woo-jin; South Korea	Tarundeep Rai; India	Sung Chia-chun; Chinese Taipei
Men's team	South Korea; Im Dong-hyun; Kim Woo-jin; Oh Jin-hyek	China; Chen Wenyuan; Dai Xiaoxiang; Xing Yu	India; Rahul Banerjee; Mangal Singh Champia; Jayanta Talukdar
Women's individual	Yun Ok-hee; South Korea	Cheng Ming; China	Kwon Un-sil; North Korea
Women's team	South Korea; Joo Hyun-jung; Ki Bo-bae; Yun Ok-hee	China; Cheng Ming; Zhang Yunlu; Zhu Shanshan	India; Dola Banerjee; Rimil Buriuly; Deepika Kumari

== Medal table ==
Rank	Nation	Gold	Silver	Bronze	Total
1	South Korea (KOR)	4	0	0	4
2	China (CHN)	0	3	0	3
3	India (IND)	0	1	2	3
4	Chinese Taipei (TPE)	0	0	1	1
4	North Korea (PRK)	0	0	1	1
Totals (5 entries)		4	4	4	12

== Participating nations ==
A total of 114 athletes from 21 nations competed in archery at the 2010 Asian Games:

- Bangladesh (6)
- China (8)
- Chinese Taipei (8)
- India (8)
- Indonesia (4)
- Iran (8)
- Iraq (1)
- Japan (8)
- Kazakhstan (7)
- Malaysia (4)
- Mongolia (7)
- Myanmar (3)
- Nepal (4)
- North Korea (4)
- Philippines (2)
- Qatar (4)
- South Korea (8)
- Sri Lanka (5)
- Tajikistan (4)
- Thailand (5)
- Vietnam (6)
