= Ba Yongshan =

Chinese archer (born 1961)

Personal information
- Nationality: Chinese
- Born: 6 August 1961 (age 63)

Sport
- Sport: Archery

Ba Yongshan (born 6 August 1961) is a Chinese archer. He competed in the men's individual event at the 1984 Summer Olympics.
