= Juan Echavarría =

Colombian archer (born 1962)

Personal information
- Nationality: Colombian
- Born: 28 January 1962 (age 63)

Sport
- Sport: Archery

Juan Echavarría (born 28 January 1962) is a Colombian former archer. He competed in the men's individual event at the 1984 Summer Olympics.
