= Wang Hee-kyung =

South Korean archer (born 1970)

- Hangul: 왕희경
- RR: Wang Huigyeong
- MR: Wang Hŭigyŏng

Wang Hee-kyung
Medal record

Women's archery

Representing Korea

Olympic Games
Gold medal – first place	1988 Seoul	Team
Silver medal – second place	1988 Seoul	Individual

World Championships
Gold medal – first place	1989 Lausanne	Team
Silver medal – second place	1987 Adelaide	Individual
Silver medal – second place	1987 Adelaide	Team

Wang Hee-kyung (born July 16, 1970) is a South Korean archer and Olympic champion. She competed at the 1988 Summer Olympics in Seoul, where she won a gold medal with the South Korean archery team, and also an individual silver medal.
