= Lo Kam Kuen =

Hong Kong archer

Personal information
- Nationality: Hong Konger
- Born: 23 August 1959 (age 65)

Sport
- Sport: Archery

Lo Kam Kuen (born 23 August 1959) is a Hong Kong archer. He competed in the men's individual event at the 1984 Summer Olympics.
