= Feng Zemin =

Chinese archer (born 1958)

Personal information
- Nationality: Chinese
- Born: 18 January 1958 (age 68)
- Height: 172 cm (5 ft 8 in)
- Weight: 73 kg (161 lb)

Sport
- Sport: Archery
Medal record
Men's recurve archery
Representing China
Asian Games
Bronze medal – third place	1982 New Delhi	Team

Feng Zemin (Chinese: 馮澤民, born 18 January 1958) is a Chinese archer. He competed in the men's individual event at the 1984 Summer Olympics.
