= Wachera Piyapattra =

Thai archer

Personal information
- Nationality: Thai
- Born: 20 September 1960 (age 64)

Sport
- Sport: Archery

Wachera Piyapattra (born 20 September 1960) is a Thai archer. He competed in the men's individual event at the 1984 Summer Olympics. He placed 50th, and did not advance beyond the qualifying round.
