= Yao Yawen =

Chinese archer (born 1967)

Personal information
- Nationality: Chinese
- Born: 2 February 1967 (age 59)
- Height: 167 cm (5 ft 6 in)
- Weight: 61 kg (134 lb)

Sport
- Sport: Archery
Medal record
Women's recurve archery
Representing China
World Championships
Bronze medal – third place	1987 Adelaide	Individual
Bronze medal – third place	1993 Antalya	Team
Asian Games
Silver medal – second place	1986 Seoul	Team

Yao Yawen (Chinese: 姚雅文, born 2 February 1967) is a Chinese archer. She competed in the women's individual and team events at the 1988 Summer Olympics.
