= Claude Rohla =

Luxembourgish archer (1951–2011)

Personal information
- Nationality: Luxembourgish
- Born: 9 November 1951; Esch-sur-Alzette, Luxembourg
- Died: 20 September 2011 (aged 59); Esch-sur-Alzette, Luxembourg

Sport
- Sport: Archery

Claude Rohla (9 November 1951 – 20 September 2011) was a Luxembourgish archer. He competed in the men's individual event at the 1984 Summer Olympics.
