= Harry Wittig =

German archer (born 1961)

Personal information
- Nationality: German
- Born: 19 June 1961 (age 64) Böblingen, West Germany

Sport
- Sport: Archery

Harry Wittig (born 19 June 1961) is a German archer. He competed in the men's individual event at the 1984 Summer Olympics.
