= Youssef Jawdat =

Saudi Arabian archer

Personal information
- Nationality: Saudi Arabian
- Born: 8 August 1963 (age 61)

Sport
- Sport: Archery

Youssef Jawdat (Arabic: يوسف جودت; born 8 August 1963) is a Saudi Arabian archer. He competed in the men's individual event at the 1984 Summer Olympics.
