= Manuel Rubio =

Spanish archer (born 1951)

Personal information
- Nationality: Spanish
- Born: 13 September 1951
- Died: 4 June 2017 (aged 65)

Sport
- Sport: Archery

Manuel Rubio (13 September 1951 – 4 June 2017) was a Spanish archer. He competed in the men's individual event at the 1984 Summer Olympics.
