= Gerard Douis =

French archer (born 1952)

Personal information
- Nationality: French
- Born: 29 February 1952 (age 73)

Sport
- Sport: Archery

Gerard Douis (born 29 February 1952) is a French archer. He competed in the men's individual event at the 1984 Summer Olympics held in Los Angeles.

He received a gold medal in the 1984 archery Olympics and qualified to the next round.
