= Philippe Loyen =

French archer (born 1962)

Personal information
- Nationality: French
- Born: 22 November 1962 (age 62)

Sport
- Sport: Archery

Philippe Loyen (born 22 November 1962) is a French archer. He competed in the men's individual event at the 1984 Summer Olympics.
