= Ma Xiangjun =

Chinese archer (born 1964)

Liang Qiuzhong
Personal information
- Born: 30 October 1964 (age 61) Qingdao, Shandong, China
- Height: 171 cm (5 ft 7 in)
- Weight: 65 kg (143 lb)

Sport
- Country: China
- Sport: Archery
Medal record
Women's archery
Representing China
Olympic Games
Silver medal – second place	1992 Barcelona	Team
World Championships
Gold medal – first place	1987 Adelaide	Individual
Bronze medal – third place	1993 Antalya	Team
Asian Games
Gold medal – first place	1986 Seoul	Individual 70m
Silver medal – second place	1986 Seoul	Team
Bronze medal – third place	1986 Seoul	Individual 50m

Ma Xiangjun (simplified Chinese: 马湘君; traditional Chinese: 馬湘君; pinyin: Mǎ Xiāngjūn; born 30 October 1964) is an archer from the People's Republic of China.

== Career ==
Ma represented China at the 1988 and 1992 Olympic Games, winning a team silver at the latter.

She competed in the 1986 Asian Games, winning a gold medal in the individual 70m event, a silver medal in the team event and a bronze medal in the individual 50m event.

In 1987, she became the first Chinese competitor to win a title at the World Archery Championships, winning the women's individual competition.
