= Ma Shaorong =

Chinese archer (born 1970)

Personal information
- Nationality: Chinese
- Born: 13 December 1970 (age 55)
- Height: 171 cm (5 ft 7 in)
- Weight: 61 kg (134 lb)

Sport
- Sport: Archery
Medal record
Women's recurve archery
Representing China
Asian Games
| Silver medal – second place | 1986 Seoul | Team |

Ma Shaorong (Chinese: 馬少榮, born 13 December 1970) is a Chinese archer. She competed in the women's individual and team events at the 1988 Summer Olympics.
