= Faisal al Basam =

Saudi Arabian archer (born 1965)

Personal information
- Nationality: Saudi Arabia
- Born: 30 November 1965 (age 59)

Sport
- Sport: Archery

Faisal al Basam (born 30 November 1965) is a Saudi Arabian archer. He competed in the 1984 Summer Olympics.
