= Tu Chih-chen =

Taiwanese archer (born 1966)

Personal information
- Nationality: Taiwanese
- Born: 3 March 1966 (age 59)

Sport
- Sport: Archery

Tu Chih-chen (born 3 March 1966) is a Taiwanese archer. He competed in the men's individual event at the 1984 Summer Olympics.
