= Dale Lightfoot (archer) =

New Zealand archer (born 1964)

Personal information
- Born: 7 September 1964 (age 62) Auckland, New Zealand
- Height: 1.87 m (6 ft 2 in)
- Weight: 81 kg (179 lb)

Sport
- Country: New Zealand
- Sport: Archery
- Club: Mountain Green Archery Club

Dale Lightfoot (born 7 September 1964) is a New Zealand archer. He competed in the men's individual event at the 1984 Summer Olympics.

== Biography ==
Lightfoot was born in Auckland on 7 September 1964. Both his father and grandfather participated in archery, and he took up the sport when he was 14 or 15 years old. A member of the Mountain Green Archery Club in Auckland, he first gained national honours when he was named in the New Zealand squad to compete internationally in Australia in 1981. By 1984, he was the national champion, and early that year he placed 13th at the Asia–Oceania target archery championships held in Christchurch.

Lightfoot was named in the New Zealand team for the 1984 Olympic Games, and in the lead-up to that event competed at the United States national championships in Ohio. At the Olympics, he finished 34th in a field of 62 competitors. Afterwards, he commented that "the first day was the worst day of [his] life", and he performed well below his personal best.

In 1988, Lightfoot again won the New Zealand national FITA title, after finishing second in the previous three years.

Lightfoot competed at the 1991 World Archery Championships in Krakow, Poland, placing 91st in the men's individual event, and 27th in the men's teams event as a member of the New Zealand team with Martin Bridger and Malcolm Edwards.

As of July 2025, Lightfoot was 39th in the New Zealand open compound rankings and 19th in the men's compound rankings.
