= Yong Fujun =

Chinese archer (born 1981)

Yong Fujun (simplified Chinese: 永富军; traditional Chinese: 永富軍; pinyin: Yǒng Fùjūn; born February 15, 1981, in Shaanxi) is an archer from China.

Yong represented China at the 2004 Summer Olympics in men's individual archery. He was defeated in the first round of elimination, placing 42nd overall.
