= Archery at the 2010 Asian Games – Women's team =

Women's team recurve at the 2010 Asian Games
- Venue: Aoti Archery Range
- Dates: 19–21 November 2010
- Competitors: 48 from 13 nations

Medalists
gold medal	South Korea; Joo Hyun-jung, Ki Bo-bae, Yun Ok-hee
silver medal	China; Cheng Ming, Zhang Yunlu, Zhu Shanshan
bronze medal	India; Dola Banerjee, Rimil Buriuly, Deepika Kumari

The women's team archery competition at the 2010 Asian Games in Guangzhou was held from 19 November to 21 November at Aoti Archery Range.

Each team consisted of the highest ranked three athletes from the qualification round.

== Schedule ==
All times are China Standard Time (UTC+08:00)

Date	Time	Event
Friday, 19 November 2010	09:00	Qualification round
Sunday, 21 November 2010	09:00	1/8 eliminations
Sunday, 21 November 2010	09:40	1/4 eliminations
Sunday, 21 November 2010	14:30	Semifinals
Sunday, 21 November 2010	15:18	Bronze medal match
Sunday, 21 November 2010	15:42	Gold medal match

== Results ==
=== Qualification round ===
Rank	Team	Distance				Total	10s	Xs
Rank	Team	70m	60m	50m	30m	Total	10s	Xs
1	South Korea (KOR)	997	1026	1004	1060	4087	250	95
	Joo Hyun-jung	328	339	328	353	1348	76	24
	Ki Bo-bae	335	342	338	353	1368	81	38
	Kim Mun-joung	~~322~~	~~331~~	~~330~~	~~355~~	~~1338~~	~~63~~	~~23~~
	Yun Ok-hee	334	345	338	354	1371	83	33
2	Chinese Taipei (TPE)	948	1000	968	1045	3961	184	63
	Lei Chien-ying	~~320~~	~~337~~	~~320~~	~~350~~	~~1327~~	~~66~~	~~29~~
	Tan Ya-ting	314	337	333	350	1334	68	31
	Wu Hui-ju	310	328	320	350	1308	58	15
	Yuan Shu-chi	324	335	315	345	1319	58	17
3	China (CHN)	944	993	964	1040	3941	164	67
	Cheng Ming	317	334	327	347	1325	56	25
	Yang Jianping	~~325~~	~~336~~	~~312~~	~~347~~	~~1320~~	~~59~~	~~20~~
	Zhang Yunlu	316	336	324	347	1323	57	23
	Zhu Shanshan	311	323	313	346	1293	51	19
4	North Korea (PRK)	957	998	941	1035	3931	173	54
	Choe Song-hui	314	330	311	343	1298	46	18
	Kwon Un-sil	332	343	330	352	1357	81	20
	Ri Un-ok	~~319~~	~~315~~	~~316~~	~~335~~	~~1285~~	~~46~~	~~21~~
	Ryu Un-hyang	311	325	300	340	1276	46	16
5	India (IND)	948	971	938	1034	3891	156	52
	Dola Banerjee	313	313	296	342	1264	45	17
	Rimil Buriuly	309	325	319	345	1298	47	18
	Deepika Kumari	326	333	323	347	1329	64	17
	Bombayla Devi Laishram	~~320~~	~~321~~	~~296~~	~~333~~	~~1270~~	~~45~~	~~12~~
6	Kazakhstan (KAZ)	923	978	942	1021	3864	131	38
	Anastassiya Bannova	285	320	309	340	1254	40	10
	Yelena Li	~~300~~	~~326~~	~~298~~	~~339~~	~~1263~~	~~45~~	~~15~~
	Olga Pilipova	318	328	312	329	1287	31	6
	Farida Tukebayeva	320	330	321	352	1323	60	22
7	Japan (JPN)	932	963	937	1025	3857	151	48
	Yuki Hayashi	307	326	314	343	1290	48	14
	Kaori Kawanaka	303	306	307	342	1258	43	11
	Sayami Matsushita	322	331	316	340	1309	60	23
	Ayaka Saito	~~307~~	~~329~~	~~324~~	~~339~~	~~1299~~	~~47~~	~~16~~
8	Mongolia (MGL)	927	958	932	1023	3840	141	49
	Chuluunbaataryn Mönkhtsetseg	303	317	321	347	1288	54	25
	Chuluuny Oyunsüren	304	322	299	339	1264	43	11
	Bishindeegiin Urantungalag	320	319	312	337	1288	44	13
9	Indonesia (INA)	870	951	920	1032	3773	142	48
	Nuraini Novia	261	301	312	339	1213	37	17
	Rina Dewi Puspitasari	280	321	297	343	1241	45	12
	Ika Yuliana Rochmawati	329	329	311	350	1319	60	19
	Erwina Safitri	~~309~~	~~317~~	~~286~~	~~334~~	~~1246~~	~~34~~	~~10~~
10	Iran (IRI)	860	936	882	1000	3678	110	38
	Zahra Dehghan	294	323	306	330	1253	39	12
	Afrouzeh Molavi	281	307	275	329	1192	28	6
	Leila Sakhaeifar	~~250~~	~~276~~	~~281~~	~~307~~	~~1114~~	~~26~~	~~10~~
	Zahra Shams	285	306	301	341	1233	43	20
11	Tajikistan (TJK)	851	899	878	985	3613	85	27
	Fotima Tagoeva	270	288	281	312	1151	23	8
	Zuhro Tagoeva	287	312	299	338	1236	34	13
	Firuza Zubaydova	294	299	298	335	1226	28	6
12	Vietnam (VIE)	770	870	824	990	3454	84	28
	Nguyễn Thị Hương	298	313	302	348	1261	37	9
	Nguyễn Thị Kiều Trang	205	269	233	309	1016	16	7
	Nguyễn Trà My	267	288	289	333	1177	31	12
13	Bangladesh (BAN)	816	865	737	916	3334	69	23
	Najmin Khatun	276	264	200	263	1003	10	4
	Mathui Prue Marma	285	295	287	340	1207	32	9
	Beauty Ray	255	306	250	313	1124	27	10

=== Knockout round ===
1/8 eliminations
9	Indonesia	201
8	Mongolia	204
5	India	225
12	Vietnam	152
13	Bangladesh	195
4	North Korea	205
11	Tajikistan	187
6	Kazakhstan	207
7	Japan	219
10	Iran	193

1/4 eliminations
1	South Korea	227
8	Mongolia	192
5	India	214
4	North Korea	202
3	China	214
6	Kazakhstan	200
7	Japan	205
2	Chinese Taipei	207

Semifinals
1	South Korea	221^{29}
5	India	221^{26}
3	China	220
2	Chinese Taipei	219

Gold medal match
1	South Korea	220^{58}
3	China	220^{55}
Bronze medal match
5	India	218
2	Chinese Taipei	217
