= Chun In-soo =

South Korean archer (born 1965)

- Hangul: 전인수
- RR: Jeon Insu
- MR: Chŏn Insu

Chun In-soo
Medal record

Men's archery

Representing South Korea

Olympic Games
Gold medal – first place	1988 Seoul	Team

World Championships
Gold medal – first place	1985 Seoul	Team
Gold medal – first place	1991 Krakow	Team
Silver medal – second place	1983 Los Angeles	Team

Asian Games
Gold medal – first place	1986 Seoul	Team
Bronze medal – third place	1986 Seoul	Individual 30m
Bronze medal – third place	1986 Seoul	Individual 70m
Bronze medal – third place	1986 Seoul	Individual 90m

Chun In-soo (Korean: 전인수; born July 13, 1965) is a South Korean archer and Olympic champion. He competed at the 1988 Summer Olympics in Seoul, and won a gold medal with the South Korean archery team. He also competed in the men's individual event at the 1984 Summer Olympics.
