= İzzet Avcı =

Turkish archer (born 1949)

Izzet Avcı
Personal information
- Nationality: Turkish
- Born: 1 January 1949 (age 76)

Sport
- Sport: Archery

Izzet Avcı (born 1 January 1949) is a Turkish archer. He competed at the 1984 Summer Olympics and the 1988 Summer Olympics.
