= Kim Hyang-min =

North Korean archer (born 1942)

Personal information
- Nationality: North Korean
- Born: February 4, 1942 (age 84)

Sport
- Sport: Archery

Kim Hyang-min (Korean: 김향민; born 4 February 1942) is a North Korean archer who represented North Korea at the 1972 Summer Olympic Games in archery.

== Career ==
Kim competed in the women's individual event and finished twentieth with a total of 2275 points.

At the 1978 Asian Games, she won a bronze medal in the women's individual and women's team events.
