= Thomas Hardmeier (archer) =

Swiss archer (born 1963)

Personal information
- Nationality: Swiss
- Born: 15 February 1963 (age 62)

Sport
- Sport: Archery

Thomas Hardmeier (born 15 February 1963) is a Swiss archer. He competed in the men's individual event at the 1984 Summer Olympics.
