= Archery at the 1982 Asian Games =

- Venue: Delhi University Grounds

Archery was contested at the 1982 Asian Games at Delhi University Grounds in New Delhi, India.

The competition included only recurve events.

== Medalists ==
Event	Gold	Silver	Bronze
Men's individual	Hiroshi Yamamoto; Japan	Kim Young-woon; South Korea	Takayoshi Matsushita; Japan
Men's team	South Korea; Eum Sun-ki; Kim Young-woon; Lee Yong-ho	Indonesia; Tatang Ferry Budiman; Donald Pandiangan; Suradi Rukimin	China; Feng Zemin; Ru Guang; Wang Youqun
Women's individual	O Gwang-sun; North Korea	Kim Jin-ho; South Korea	Kim Mi-young; South Korea
Women's team	South Korea; Kim Jin-ho; Kim Mi-young; Park Young-sook	North Korea; Kim Hye-suk; Kim Tae-suk; O Gwang-sun	China; Guo Meizhen; Kong Yaping; Meng Fanai

== Medal table ==
Rank	Nation	Gold	Silver	Bronze	Total
1	South Korea (KOR)	2	2	1	5
2	North Korea (PRK)	1	1	0	2
3	Japan (JPN)	1	0	1	2
4	Indonesia (INA)	0	1	0	1
5	China (CHN)	0	0	2	2
Totals (5 entries)		4	4	4	12
