= Zhang Zheng (archer) =

Chinese archer (born 1963)

Personal information
- Nationality: Chinese
- Born: 18 May 1963 (age 61)

Sport
- Sport: Archery

Zhang Zheng (born 18 May 1963) is a Chinese archer. He competed in the men's individual event at the 1984 Summer Olympics.
