= Zhangzheng =

Zhangzheng 掌政镇
- Town
- Location in Ningxia
- Coordinates: 38°24′15″N 106°21′24″E
- Country: People's Republic of China
- Autonomous region: Ningxia
- Prefecture-level city: Yinchuan
- District: Xingqing District
- Time zone: UTC+8 (China Standard)

Zhangzheng (Chinese: 掌政; pinyin: Zhǎngzhèng) is a town under the administration of Xingqing District, Yinchuan, Ningxia, China. As of 2020, it administers Hengcheng Huayuan Community (横城花园社区) and the following 12 villages:

- Zhangzheng Village
- Chunlin Village (春林村)
- Walu Village (洼路村)
- Wuduqiao Village (五渡桥村)
- Zhenhe Village (镇河村)
- Kongque Village (孔雀村)
- Yongnan Village (永南村)
- Jianfuqiao Village (碱富桥村)
- Qiangjiamiao Village (强家庙村)
- Yangjiazhai Village (杨家寨村)
- Maosheng Village (茂盛村)
- Hengcheng Village (横城村)
