= Dale Lightfoot (geographer) =

American geographer, academic and researcher

Dale R. Lightfoot
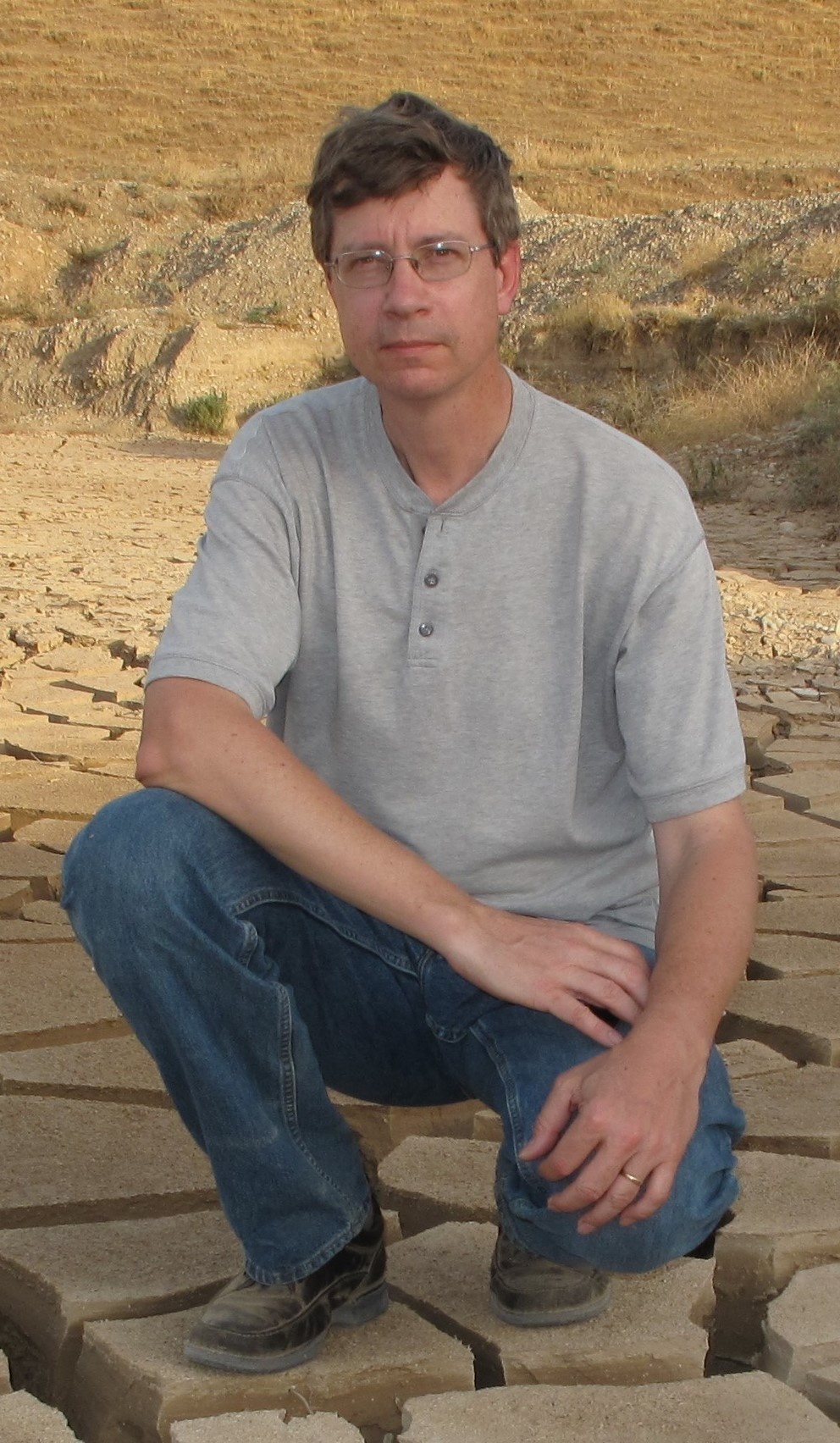
- Occupations: Geographer, academic and researcher

Academic background
- Education: M.S., Geography; Ph.D. Geography
- Alma mater: Oklahoma State University; University of Colorado
- Thesis: The Prehistoric Pebble-Mulched Fields of the Galisteo Anasazi: Agricultural Innovation and Adaptation to Environment (1990)

Dale R. Lightfoot is an American geographer, academic and researcher. He is Professor Emeritus of Geography and a former Fulbright Program Advisor at Oklahoma State University.

Lightfoot has authored more than 50 publications. His research interests include resource management, cultural ecology, and historical water systems in North Africa, the Middle East, and Central Asia. Since 1992, he has conducted country-wide surveys of qanats in Morocco, Tunisia, Spain, Germany, the Czech Republic, Cyprus, Syria, Jordan, Iraq, Yemen, and Uzbekistan.

== Education ==
Lightfoot received his Master’s Degree in Geography from Oklahoma State University in 1986. He then enrolled in the University of Colorado and earned his Doctoral degree in Geography in 1990.

== Career ==
Following his doctoral degree, Lightfoot started his academic career as assistant professor at Old Dominion University from 1990 to 1994 and taught several courses, including Cultural Geography, Environmental Issues, Computer Cartography, and North America. In fall 1994, he joined Oklahoma State University as assistant professor of geography, and was promoted to associate professor in 1996, and to professor in 2001. While at OSU he taught international resource management, geography of the Middle East, geography of Africa, political geography and world regional geography, among others. He retired in 2021, becoming professor emeritus at Oklahoma State University. During his tenure at Oklahoma State University, he also held an administrative appointment as head of the Department of Geography from 2000 to 2017.

== Research ==
Lightfoot has worked on historical landscapes, resource management, historical water technology, and cultural ecology in the Southwest U.S., North Africa, the Middle East, and Central Asia. His most important research programs include: a dissertation and a series of articles on the history and cultural ecology of lithic mulch agriculture (1990-1995); directing a USAID-funded program for training scholars and developing the first facilities and corps of GIScience professionals in Iraq (2004-2006); and a series of field-based surveys and publications on the history, ecology, and contemporary stories of qanat water systems in a dozen countries, followed by a magnum opus on the global story of qanat water supply (1992-2024).

=== Historical landscapes and sustainability of water resources ===
In his work on historical landscapes, Lightfoot has studied ancient methods of rock mulching as an adaptation to arid environments. He has drawn a comparison between regional variations in surface geology and placement of pebble‐mulch gardens in the Galisteo Basin of New Mexico. Results of his studies indicated that Anasazi Puebloan people purposively exploited the scaled variations in geology and soils in their pursuit of agricultural diversification. He later explored evidence for gravel mulching while mapping the ancient rock-bordered grids of the Safford Valley as part of a team of scholars studying these expansive and enigmatic features in southeastern Arizona. Lightfoot (with T. Wikle) examined landscapes of the slave trade in West Africa, and presented various aspects including structures, documents and tales of slavers and slaves through encounters between Africa and Europe. He described the roles of African middlemen from the local population, and highlighted James and Gorée Islands as symbols of slavery's effects on Africa and Africans.

Between 1992 and 1996 Lightfoot worked with the Moroccan-American Project at Sijilmasa to map the city plan of the Sijilmasa archaeological site and study the environmental history of the Tafilalt Oasis and changes to the historical landscape that reflect changes in the cityscape and population of medieval Sijilmasa. Another study in southern Morocco employed multi-methods field research, mapping from aerial photographs, and transportation modeling using GIS network analysis to show that the adaptive, communal system of traditional canals continues to serve the needs of villages with an efficiency of distribution that comes close to a modern, engineer-designed canal network. In a paper published in 2009, Lightfoot discussed the reliability of interview data in the context of monitoring and mapping groundwater. He drew comparisons between water table depths reported by users of traditional wells and data collected independently from monitoring wells for the years 1985, 1995, 2000, and 2005. He found that the correlation between well water depths is at least 0.9 and the regression coefficient is between 0.80 and 0.87, demonstrating the reliability of oral reporting from traditional wells to monitor groundwater conditions in the absence of hydrological well monitoring.

=== Cultural Ecology ===
Working in the subfield of cultural ecology, Lightfoot defined lithic-mulch agriculture (LMA) as an approach to employ volcanic ash and cinder, pebbles, stones and other materials as a mulch to enhance crop growth. He focused on the usage of lithic mulch in the context of locales with a seasonal moisture deficit as a strategy to increase soil moisture, reduce erosion, moderate soil temperature, and increase crop yields. Lightfoot regarded pebble mulch gardens as a peripheral innovation outside of the Anasazi cultural core, and studied the limited usage and contributions of pebble-mulch gardens in the food production of Puebloan settlements. He later expanded this research in the prehistoric and contemporary uses of lithic-mulch agriculture as a taxonomically discrete form of agriculture around the world.

Lightfoot’s research on qanat water systems has often included an examination of why qanats were sited in certain places, as an adaptation to local environments. During fieldwork in Syria, Jordan, Yemen, and Tunisia he overlaid qanat sites with local conditions of rainfall, evapotranspiration, topography, geology, and the depth and transmissivity of aquifers to reflect on the role of these environmental parameters in local decisions to build and maintain qanats.

=== Qanat Water Systems ===
Since 1992, Lightfoot has conducted a series of field studies and country surveys of qanats, or subterranean water systems. In a 1996 paper he mapped and described changes in the uses of water and social transformations responsible for diminishing the health of traditional qanat systems in the Tafilalt Oasis of Morocco. Country-wide surveys of qanats in Syria and Jordan were conducted in 1993-1994 to examine the history, ecology, and continued use of qanat irrigation. This work was expanded to Yemen in 1998 and, in another paper published in 2000, Lightfoot examined the origin and diffusion of qanats in the broader Arabian Peninsula using new evidence from the northern and southern Peninsula. In 2009 he completed a survey of qanats in the Kurdistan region of northern Iraq under the auspices of UNESCO for the purpose of guiding UNESCO and IOM in the refurbishment of qanats to revitalize village water supplies and stem the outmigration of people during a protracted drought. Lightfoot also completed field surveys of qanats in Uzbekistan, Cyprus, Tunisia, Bavaria, and the Czech Republic that were included in his book on the global story of qanat water supply.

== Awards and honors ==
- 2007 - Middle East Book Award for best nonfiction/reference for Iraq, Middle East Outreach Council

== Bibliography ==
- Walsh, S. J., Lightfoot, D. R., & Butler, D. R. (1987). Recognition and assessment of error in geographic information systems. Photogrammetric Engineering and Remote Sensing, 53(10), 1423-1430.
- Lightfoot, D. R. (1996). Syrian qanat Romani: history, ecology, abandonment. Journal of Arid Environments, 33(3), 321-336.
- Lightfoot, D. R. (1996). Moroccan khettara: traditional irrigation and progressive desiccation. Geoforum, 27(2), 261-273.
- Lightfoot, D. R. (1997). Qanats in the Levant: hydraulic technology at the periphery of early empires. Technology and Culture, 38(2), 432-451.
- Lightfoot, D. R. (2000). The origin and diffusion of qanats in Arabia: new evidence from the northern and southern peninsula. Geographical Journal, 166(3), 215-226.
- Lightfoot, D. R. (2000). Ghayl and miyan in Arabia Felix: the ecology of diffusion and recession of use. The Arab World Geographer, 3(1), 2-21.
- Lightfoot, D. R. (2004). The Landscape context of rock-bordered grids: GIS analysis and mapping. In Doolittle and Neely (eds), pp. 38-47, The Safford Valley Grids: Prehistoric Cultivation in the Southern Arizona Desert. Tucson: University of Arizona Press.
- Lightfoot, D. R. (2009). Survey of infiltration karez in northern Iraq: history and current status of underground aqueducts. United Nations Educational, Scientific and Cultural Organization (UNESCO), Report IQ/2009/SC/RP/1.
- Lightfoot, D. R., Mavlyanov, N., Begimkulov, D., and Comer., J. (2009). Reliability of interview data for monitoring and mapping groundwater. International Association of Hydrological Sciences Red Book, 334, 40-43.
- Lightfoot, D. R., Finchum, A., Vadjunec, J. M., Andrews, J. Odenwald, J. (2023). Traditional environmental knowledge and transport efficiency of a communal canal network, Tafilalt oasis, Morocco: A historical GIS analytics perspective. Journal of Historical Geography, 80, 79-93.
- Lightfoot, D. R. Qanat: Stream of Wells. (2024) ISBN 978-1838602178
