= Jang Sun-yong =

North Korean archer (born 1951)

Personal information
- Nationality: North Korean
- Born: 6 August 1951 (age 74) North Korea
- Height: 162 cm (5 ft 4 in)
- Weight: 56 kg (123 lb)

Sport
- Country: PRK
- Sport: Archery
Medal record
Asian Games
Bronze medal – third place	1978 Bangkok	Team

Jang Sun-yong (Korean: 장순영, born 6 August 1951) is a North Korean Olympic archer. She represented her country in the women's individual competition at the 1976 Summer Olympics. She came in 4th place after rounds one and two, missing out on a medal by just 2 points out of 2407. She won a bronze medal at the 1978 Asian Games in the women's team event.
