= Rui Santos (archer) =

Portuguese archer (born 1967)

Personal information
- Nationality: Portuguese
- Born: 3 February 1967 (age 58)

Sport
- Sport: Archery

Rui Santos (born 3 February 1967) is a Portuguese archer. He competed at the 1984 Summer Olympics and the 1988 Summer Olympics.
