= Fok Ming Shan =

Hong Kong archer

Personal information
- Nationality: Hong Konger
- Born: 5 July 1958 (age 66)

Sport
- Sport: Archery

Fok Ming Shan (born 5 July 1958) is a Hong Kong archer. He competed at the 1984 Summer Olympics and the 1988 Summer Olympics.
