= Archery at the 1978 Asian Games =

- Venue: Huamark Sport Complex
- Dates: 14–15 December 1978

Archery was contested from 14 December to 15 December at the 1978 Asian Games in Hua Mark Sport Complex, Bangkok, Thailand. The competition included only recurve events.

Japan finished first in the medal table by winning three gold medals.

== Medalists ==
Event	Gold	Silver	Bronze
Men's individual	Ichiro Shimamura; Japan	Yoshiro Miyata; Japan	Izumi Sato; Japan
Men's team	Japan; Yoshiro Miyata; Izumi Sato; Ichiro Shimamura	China; Hao Shengqi; Ji Zhangmin; Wang Youqun	Indonesia; Adang Adjidji; Siddak Jubadjati; Donald Pandiangan
Women's individual	Kim Jin-ho; South Korea	Yuriko Goto; Japan	Kim Hyang-min; North Korea
Women's team	Japan; Yuriko Goto; Noriko Inoue; Yoshiko Okazaki	South Korea; Hwang Sook-zoo; Kim Jin-ho; Oh Young-sook	North Korea; Han Sun-hi; Jang Sun-yong; Kim Hyang-min

== Medal table ==
Rank	Nation	Gold	Silver	Bronze	Total
1	Japan (JPN)	3	2	1	6
2	South Korea (KOR)	1	1	0	2
3	China (CHN)	0	1	0	1
4	North Korea (PRK)	0	0	2	2
5	Indonesia (INA)	0	0	1	1
Totals (5 entries)		4	4	4	12
