= Park Young-sook (archer) =

South Korean archer (born 1960)

Personal information
- Born: August 4, 1960 (age 65)
Medal record
Women's archery
Representing South Korea
World Championships
Gold medal – first place	1979 Berlin	Team
Gold medal – first place	1983 Los Angeles	Team
Silver medal – second place	1981 Punta Ala	Team
Asian Games
Gold medal – first place	1982 New Delhi	Team

Park Young-sook (Korean: 박영숙; born 4 August 1960), also known as Sally Park, is a South Korean former archer, archery judge and current coach.

== Archery competitor ==
Park won a gold medal at the World Archery Championships in 1979 in the women's team event and a silver medal in the same event two years later.

She won a gold medal at the 1982 Asian Games along with Kim Jin-ho and Kim Mi-young.

At the 1984 Summer Olympic Games she came seventeenth with 2445 points scored in the women's individual event. Park retired in 1987 after a shoulder injury.

== After retirement ==
She coached the Italian recurve women's team to the gold medal at the World Archery Championships in 2011. Park moved on to coach the South Korean youth team and Singapore team. She coached Areneo David and he became Malawi's first Olympian in archery in 2016.

Park received the World Archery Women's Award 2017.

Park became head coach of the Bhutan national team in 2018.
