= Koo Ja-chung =

South Korean archer (born 1967)

Personal information
- Nationality: South Korean
- Born: 22 January 1967 (age 59)

Sport
- Sport: Archery
Medal record
Men's archery
Representing South Korea
World Championships
Gold medal – first place	1985 Seoul	Team
Silver medal – second place	1983 Los Angeles	Team
Silver medal – second place	1985 Seoul	Individual
Asian Games
Gold medal – first place	1986 Seoul	Team
Silver medal – second place	1986 Seoul	Individual 30m
Silver medal – second place	1986 Seoul	Individual 70m
Silver medal – second place	1986 Seoul	Individual 90m
Bronze medal – third place	1986 Seoul	Individual

Koo Ja-chung (born 22 January 1967) is a South Korean archer. He competed in the men's individual event at the 1984 Summer Olympics.
