= Tomokazu Wakino =

Japanese archer (born 1976)

Medal record

Men's Archery

Asian Games
Silver medal – second place	2006 Doha	Individual

Tomokazu Wakino (脇野 智和, Wakino Tomokazu) (born 1 December 1976) is a Japanese archer, who won the silver medal in the individual competition at the 2006 Asian Games.
