= Hiroko Ishizu =

Japanese archer

Hiroko Ishizu (石津 裕子, Ishizu Hiroko; born 8 November 1956) is a Japanese archer and educator.

== Early life ==
Ishizu first started archery as a college student at Yamaguchi University, with four-hour training sessions twice a week. She went on to become an elementary school teacher, continuing archery training early in the morning and late at night.

== Archery career ==
In 1977, Ishizu competed at the National Archery Association tournament at Miami University in Oxford, Ohio, as the national women's champion from Japan.

In 1984, Ishizu competed at the Summer Olympic Games in Los Angeles in the women's individual event and finished fourth with 2524 points scored, after initially tying for second place in the first round. It was the first fourth-place finish for Japan in Olympic women's archery.

Ishizu won a bronze medal at the 1986 Asian Games in the team event.
