= 1987 World Archery Championships =

- Location: Adelaide, Australia
- Start date: March

The 1987 World Archery Championships was the 34th edition of the event. It was held in Adelaide, Australia in March 1987 and was organised by World Archery Federation (FITA).

It marked the first time that the competition took a knockout format.

== Medals summary ==
=== Recurve ===
Event	Gold	Silver	Bronze
Men's individual	Vladimir Yesheyev; Soviet Union	Andreas Lippoldt; West Germany	Jay Barrs; United States
Women's individual	Ma Xiangjun; China	Wang Hee-kyung; South Korea	Yao Yawen; China
Men's team	West Germany	United States	China
Women's team	Soviet Union	South Korea	France

== Medals table ==
Rank	Nation	Gold	Silver	Bronze	Total
1	Soviet Union	2	0	0	2
2	West Germany	1	1	0	2
3	China	1	0	2	3
4	South Korea	0	2	0	2
5	United States	0	1	1	2
6	France	0	0	1	1
Totals (6 entries)		4	4	4	12
