= Dilhara Salgado =

Sri Lankan archer (born 1983)

Personal information
- Nationality: Sri Lankan
- Born: 25 March 1983 (age 43) Colombo, Sri Lanka
- Education: Methodist College Colombo

Sport
- Country: Sri Lanka
- Sport: Archery
- Club: Sri Lanka Air Force Archery Club

Dilhara Salgado (born 25 March 1983) is a Sri Lankan archer. She attended Methodist College, Colombo and is a member of the Sri Lanka Air Force Archery Club. She competed in the 2011 World Archery Championships in Turin, Italy, scoring 1289.

Salgado has also participated in the 2006 Asian Games and in the 2010 Asian Games. She competed at the Olympic qualification tournament in the United States in an attempt to reach the 2012 Summer Olympics.

In the 2016 South Asian Games, she was part of the Sri Lankan women's archery team which won the silver medal in the Archery event.
