= O Gwang-sun =

North Korean archer (born 1964)

O Gwang-sun (born 17 July 1964) is a North Korean archer who represented North Korea at the 1980 Summer Olympic Games.

== Career ==
O Gwang-sun competed at the 1980 Summer Olympic Games in the women's individual event and finished fifth with a score of 2401 points. At the 1991 World Archery Championships she came 25th.
