= Zahra Dehghan =

Iranian archer (born 1988)

Medal record

Women's archery

Representing Iran

Asian Championships
Silver medal – second place	2011 Tehran	Individual

Zahra Dehghan Abnavi (Persian: زهرا دهقان ابنوی, born 11 February 1988 in Shiraz) is an Iranian archer.

She qualified for a place in archery in the 2012 Summer Olympics and took part in the women's recurve bow category.
