= Dola Banerjee =

Indian archer (born 1980)

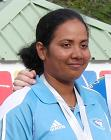

Personal information
- Nationality: Indian
- Born: 2 June 1980 (age 46) Baranagar, North 24 Parganas district, West Bengal, India
- Occupation: Sportsperson (Archer)
Medal record
Women's recurve archery
Representing India
Asian Games
Bronze medal – third place	2010 Guangzhou	Team
Asian Championships
Bronze medal – third place	2005 New Delhi	Team
Bronze medal – third place	2007 Xi'an	Team
World Cup
Gold medal – first place	2007 Dubai	Individual
Commonwealth Games
Gold medal – first place	2010 New Delhi	Team
Bronze medal – third place	2010 New Delhi	Individual

Dola Banerjee (born 2 June 1980) is an Indian sportswoman who competes in archery.

== Early life ==
Dola Banerjee is daughter of Ashok Banerjee and Kalpana Banerjee. She was born in Baranagar near Kolkata. She studied in Baranagar Rajkumari Memorial Girls High School. At the age of eight, she joined Baranagar Archery Club. Her first international appearance was in Youth World Championship in San Diego in 1996

== Career ==
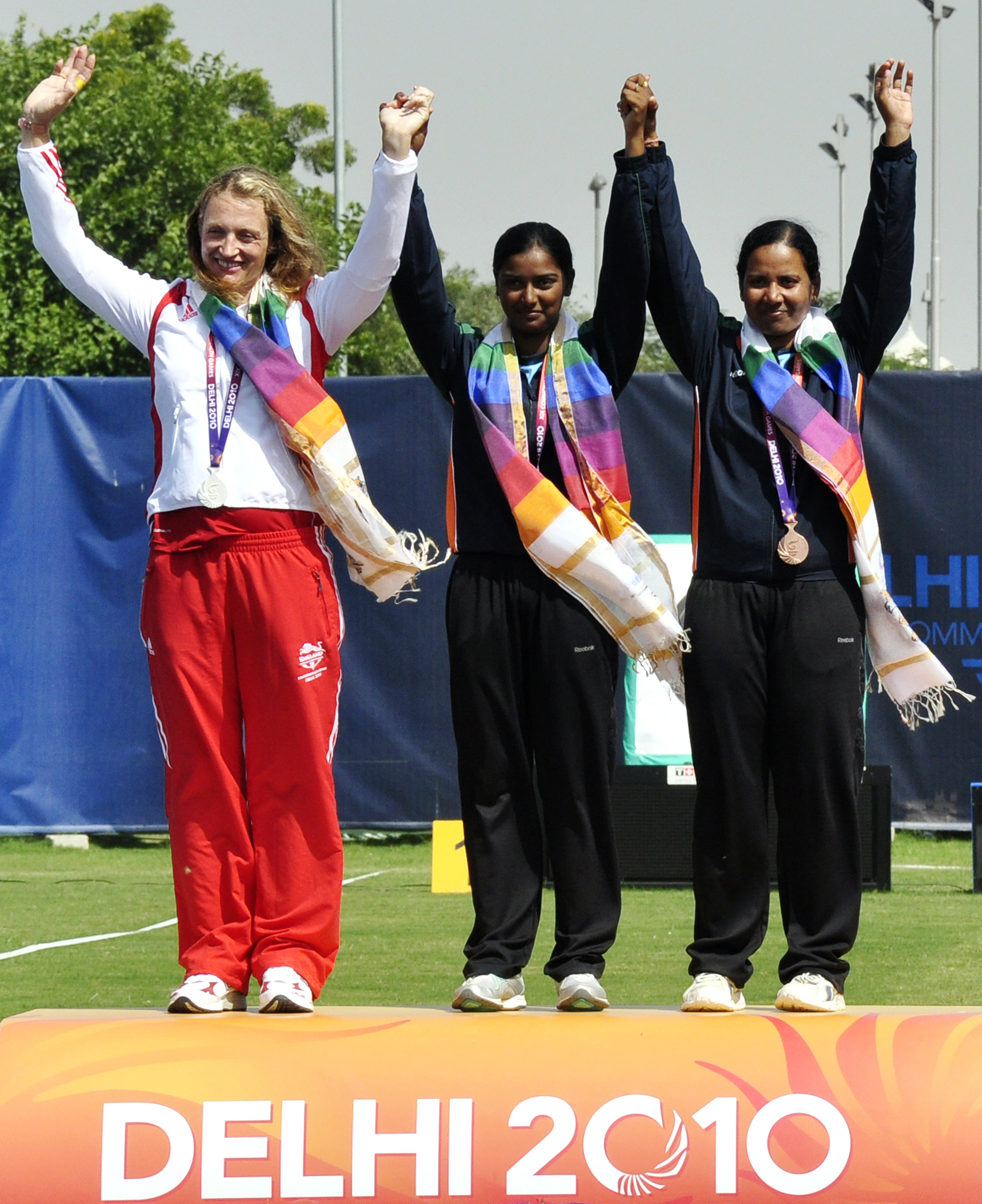
XIX Commonwealth Games-2010 Delhi archery (women's individual recurve) Deepika Kumari of India (gold), Alison Jane Williamson of England (silver) and Dola Banerjee of India (bronze) during the medal presentation ceremony

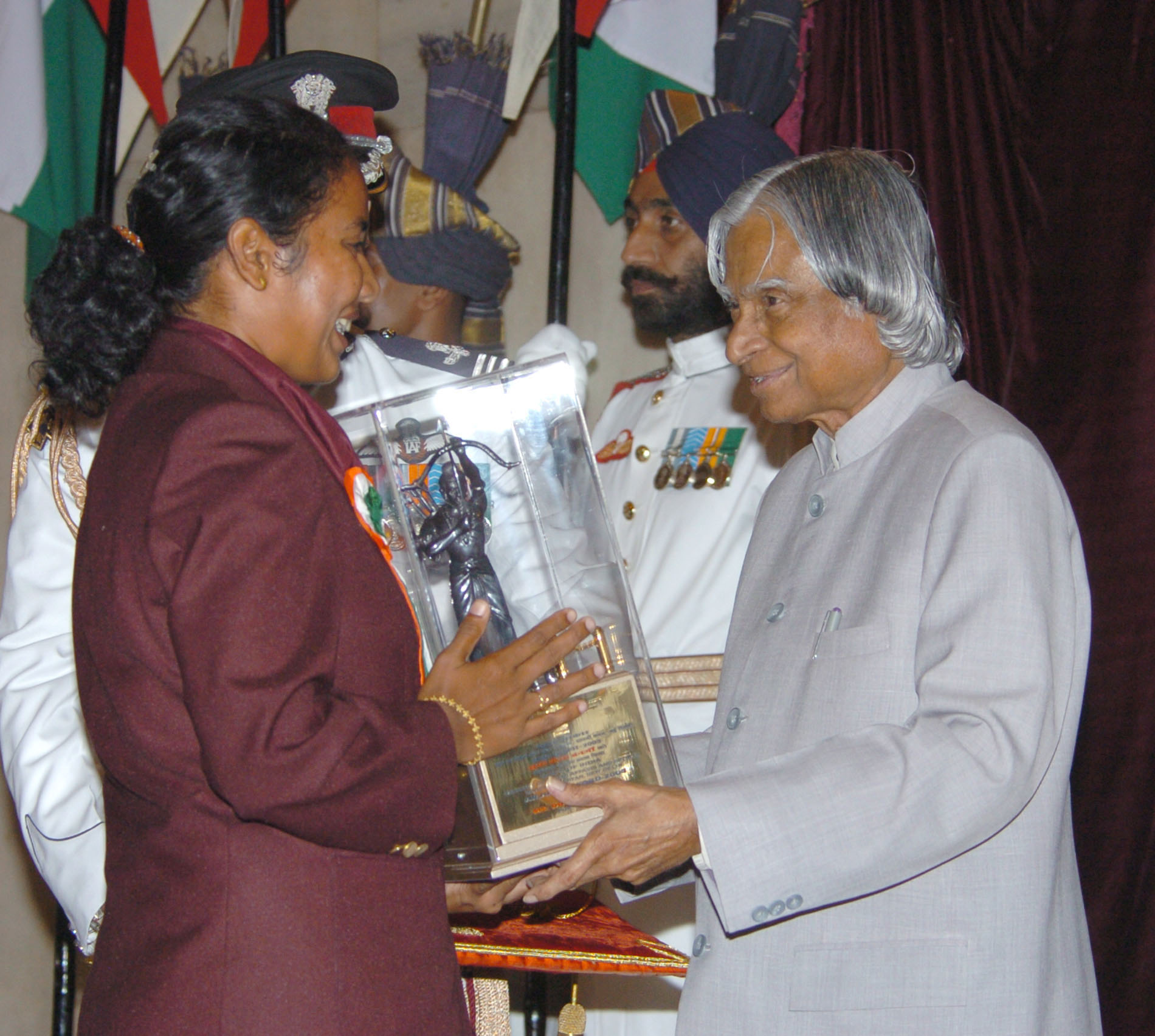
The President Dr. A.P.J. Abdul Kalam presenting the Arjuna Award -2005 to Ms. Dola Banerjee for Archery, at a glittering function in New Delhi on August 29, 2006

Dola Banerjee started archery at the Baranagar Archery Club in 1990 when she was barely 9 years of age. She represented at 16 at the Youth World Championship, San Diego in 1996. Since then she has been a regular member of the Indian women's archery team. Dola Banerjee represented India at the 2004 Summer Olympics. She was placed 13th in the women's individual ranking round with a 72-arrow score of 642. In the first round of elimination, she faced 52nd-ranked Kirstin Jean Lewis of South Africa. Dola fell victim to an upset, losing 141–131 in the 18-arrow match, placing 52nd overall in women's individual archery. Dola was also a member of the 8th-place Indian women's archery team.

During her 20 years in international Archery she has represented the country at more than 50 competitions including 2 Olympic Games, 3 Asian Games, 4 World Championship, 4 Asian Championship, 11 World Cups, 3 European Grand Prix, 10 Asian Grand Prix, 2 SAF Games, 1 Commonwealth Games and many others. She has won more than 16 Gold, 3 Silver and 8 Bronze medals for the country.

Dola Banerjee won the second international gold medal of her career when she won the individual recurve title of the fourth leg of the Meteksan World Cup archery at Dover (England) in August 2007. Having won the fourth leg, she qualified for the world cup final held at Dubai in November 2007 where the winners of the four legs competed.

Dola Banerjee became world champion in archery by winning the gold medal in the women's individual recurve competition at the archery world cup held at Dubai, in November 2007.

Dola Banerjee is the second woman archer to be honored with the Arjuna award by the Government of India in 2005.

=== Contribution at National Level ===
At the National Level she has won more than 52 gold, 21 silver and eight bronze medals. Her absolute dominance at the Junior National Level during the five years that she played at that level is clear as she won a medal in all categories by winning 19 gold, five silver and six bronze medals. She won 30 medals out of a possibility of 30 medals.

Dola Banerjee was honored by the Indian Government when she was awarded the Arjuna Award in 2005 for her excellent contribution to Archery.

She was a Member in the Sports Development body of the West Bengal Government since July 2011 and playing a key role in development of sports in her state.

Banerjee was also a member of the Steering Committee for Youth Affairs and Sports for the Twelfth Five Year Plan.

She is also actively involved with Baranagar Archery Club, her local club where she started her career, for the development of the sport.

Presently she is employed with the Eastern Railways. She has been also part of the Railways Sports Promotion Board contingent, traveling to the London Olympics 2012 and Rio Olympics 2016.

=== 2008 Beijing Summer Olympics ===
Dola represented India in the women's individual as well as team events at the 2008 Beijing Olympics, but failed to reach the finals in both events. She teamed up with Pranitha Vardhineni and Bombayala Devi in the team event. They were ranked sixth in the qualifiers. They got a bye in the round of 16, but lost to China by 206–211 in the quarterfinals. in the individual event, she was ranked 31st, and lost to Marie-Pier Beaudet of Canada by 8–10 in the tie break, after scoring 108–108 in the full set of arrows.

=== 2010 Delhi Commonwealth Games ===
In Commonwealth Games 2010 in New Delhi, she won the gold medal in women's team recurve with Deepika Kumari and L Bombayala Devi

She also won a bronze medal in the recurve individual event.

== Achievements ==
- Arjuna Award on the year of 2005.
- 1st woman who have qualified for Olympic in the individual event on 2004 Athens Olympic.
- Won individual gold on 2007 World Cup and as well as World Cup final on the same year.
- Won gold in the 2010 Commonwealth games.
- Team bronze in the Asian Games in 2010.

Year	Name of the competition	Venue	Name of the event	Place
2010	16th Asian Games	Gwangju, China	Team	Bronze
2010	19th Commonwealth Games	New Delhi	Indv Team	Bronze Gold
2010	3rd World Cup	Ogden, USA	Team	Silver
2010	2nd World Cup	Antaliya, Turkey	Indv	4th
2010	1st World Cup	Porec, Croatia		Participate
2010	1st Asian Grand Prix	Bangkokok Thailand	Team	Gold
2010	SAF Games	Dhaka Bangladesh	Indv Team	Gold Gold
2009	5th Asian Grand Prix	Dhaka, Bangladesh	Indv Team	Gold Gold
2009	4th Asian Grand Prix	Kolkata, India	Indv Team	Bronze Gold
2009	45th World Archery Championship	Ulsan, Korea		Participate
2009	3rd World Cup	Antalya, Turkey	Team	Bronze
2009	2nd World Cup	Porec, Croatia	Team	4th
2009	1st World Cup	Dominican Republic,	Indv	Bronze
2008	Asian Grand Prix	Manila, Philippines	Indv Team	Bronze Gold
2008	XXIX Olympic Games	Beijing, China	Team	7th
2008	3rd Archery World Cup	Antalya, Turkey	-------------	Participated
2008	2nd Archery World Cup	Porec, Croatia	-------------	Participated
2008	1st Archery World Cup	Santo Domingo	-------------	Participated
2007	World Cup Final	Dubai	Individual	Gold
2007	Asian Archery Grand Prix	Isfahan, Iran	Team	Gold
2007	Asian Archery Championship, China	China	Team	Bronze
2007	World Archery Championship, Germany	Germany	Women team qualified for Olympics 08	
2007	4th World Cup	Dover, Great Britain	Individual Team	Gold Bronze
2007	2nd World Cup	Antalya, Turkey	-----------	Participated
2007	2nd World Cup	Antalia, Turkey	-----------	Participated
2007	1st World Cup	Ulsan, Korea	Individual	Lost in quarter final
2006	Asian Games	Doha, Qatar	Individual	4th
2006	Asian Circuit	Myanmar,	Team	Silver
2006	4th World Cup	Shanghai, China	Team	4th
2006	SAF Games	Colombo, Sri Lanka	Individual Team	Gold Gold
2006	2nd World Cup	Antalia, Turkey	Individual	Lost in quarter final
2006	1st World Cup	Croatia	--------------	Participated
2006	SAF Championship	Bangladesh	Individual Team	Gold Gold
2005	Asian Archery Championship	New Delhi	Team	Bronze
2005	Senior World Archery Championship	Madrid, Spain	Team	4th place
2005	European Grand Prix	Antalya, Turkey	Individual Team	Gold Silver
2004	XXVIII Olympic Games	Athens	Team	8th place
2004	3rd European grand Prix	Turkey	Individual Team	7th place 4th place
2004	2nd European Grand Prix	Germany	Team	4th place
2003	13th Asian Archery Championship	Myanmar	Team	4th place
2003	42nd World Archery Championship	New York	Individual	Lost in quarter final

== Personal life ==
Dola Banerjee is married to a corporate professional, Medhadeep Banerjee, and is a mother of a son, Diyan. Her younger brother Rahul Banerjee is also an Olympian and Arjuna Awardee archer. She is a cousin of the singers Shaan and Sagarika.

== See also ==
- Archery at the 2010 Commonwealth Games
- Indian Squad for 2008 Olympics
