= Rimil Buriuly =

Indian archer (born 1991)

Personal information
- Nationality: Indian
- Citizenship: Indian
- Born: 9 January 1991 (age 35)
- Occupation: Archery
- Height: 162.56 cm (5 ft 4.00 in)
Medal record
Representing India
Asian Games
Bronze medal – third place	2010 Guangzhou	Recurve team

Rimil Buriuly (born 9 January 1991) is an Indian archer. Rimil was part of bronze winning team in Women's Recurve event at the 2010 Asian Games held in Guangzhou, China between 12 and 27 November 2010. Rimil is employed in Indian Railways in Bilaspur, Chhattisgarh. She has also won the silver medal at world championships in the team event in 2015 at Copenhagen, Denmark.

== Career ==
Rimil has won several medals at Youth and senior level events. Rimil will represent India in Rio Olympics, 2016.

Event	Location	Medal	Discipline
2nd Asian Grand Prix 10–16 June 2008	Tehran, Iran	2nd place, silver medalist(s)	Team Women (Recurve)
Youth World Championship 6–12 October 2008	Antalya, Turkey	2nd place, silver medalist(s)	Team Women (Recurve)
4th Asian Grand Prix 16-19 Sept 2009	Kolkata, India	1st place, gold medalist(s)	Team Women (Recurve)
4th Asian Grand Prix 16-19 Sept 2009	Kolkata, India	2nd place, silver medalist(s)	Individual Women (Recurve)
FITA World Cup Archery Stage 3 2–7 June 2009	Antalya, Turkey	3rd place, bronze medalist(s)	Team Women (Recurve)
1st Asian Grand Prix 19–23 February 2009	Bangkok, Thailand	2nd place, silver medalist(s)	Team Women (Recurve)
11th South Asian Games 29 Jan-8 Feb 2010	Dhaka, Bangladesh	1st place, gold medalist(s)	Team Women (Recurve)
16th Asian Games 12–27 November 2010	Guangzhou, China	3rd place, bronze medalist(s)	Team Women (Recurve)
World Youth Championship 23–28 August 2011	Legnica, Poland	3rd place, bronze medalist(s)	Team Women (Recurve)
3rd Asian Grand prix 24–31 May 2011	Dhaka, Bangladesh	1st place, gold medalist(s)	Team Women (Recurve)
3rd Asian Grand prix 24–31 May 2011	Dhaka, Bangladesh	1st place, gold medalist(s)	Individual (Recurve)
3rd Asian Grand prix 24–31 May 2011	Dhaka, Bangladesh	1st place, gold medalist(s)	Mix Team (Recurve)
FITA World cup Archery stage 3 13–22 July 2013	Medellín, Colombia	1st place, gold medalist(s)	Team women (Recurve)
FITA World cup Archery stage 4 17–26 August 2013	Wrocław, Poland	1st place, gold medalist(s)	Team Women (Recurve)
World Archery Championships 26 July-2 August 2015	Copenhagen, Denmark	2nd place, silver medalist(s)	Team Women (Recurve)
