= Ichiro Shimamura =

Japanese archer (born 1949)

Personal information
- Nationality: Japanese
- Born: 11 March 1949 (age 76)

Sport
- Sport: Archery

Ichiro Shimamura (島村一郎, Shimamura Ichiro; born 11 March 1949) is a Japanese archer. He competed in the men's individual event at the 1984 Summer Olympics.
