= Archery at the Pan American Games =

- No. of events: 4 (men: 2; women: 2)

Archery has been part of the Pan American Games since the 1979 Games in San Juan, Puerto Rico.

== Medal table ==
Table includes discontinued events.
Updated to include the 2023 edition.

Rank	Nation	Gold	Silver	Bronze	Total
1	United States	60	43	12	115
2	Mexico	7	14	27	48
3	Canada	4	10	14	28
4	Colombia	4	3	9	16
5	Cuba	3	4	8	15
6	El Salvador	2	1	2	5
7	Argentina	1	1	1	3
8	Puerto Rico	1	0	1	2
9	Brazil	0	3	6	9
10	Chile	0	2	1	3
11	Guatemala	0	1	0	1
12	Venezuela	0	0	1	1
Totals (12 entries)		82	82	82	246

== Current events ==
=== Men's Recurve Individual ===
Event	Gold	Silver	Bronze
1979	Rodney Baston; United States	Darrell Pace; United States	Stan Siatkowski; Canada
1983	Darrell Pace; United States	Richard McKinney; United States	Emilio Dutra e Mello; Brazil
1987	Jay Barrs; United States	Denis Canuel; Canada	Darrell Pace; United States
1991	Darrell Pace; United States	Edwin Eliason; United States	Ricardo Rojas; Mexico
1995	Edwin Eliason; United States	Vic Wunderle; United States	Rob Rusnov; Canada
1999	Jason McKittrick; United States	Vic Wunderle; United States	Butch Johnson; United States
2003	Vic Wunderle; United States	Guy Krueger; United States	Ricardo Merlos; El Salvador
2007	Adrián Puentes; Cuba	Juan Carlos Stevens; Cuba	Vic Wunderle; United States
2011	Brady Ellison; United States	Crispin Duenas; Canada	Daniel Pineda; Colombia
2015	Luis Álvarez; Mexico	Brady Ellison; United States	Jason Lyon; Canada
2019	Crispin Duenas; Canada	Marcus D'Almeida; Brazil	Eric Peters; Canada
2023	Jackson Mirich; United States	Matias Grande; Mexico	Ricardo Soto; Chile

=== Men's Recurve Team ===
Event	Gold	Silver	Bronze
1979	United States: Rodney Baston; Darrell Pace; Richard McKinney	Canada: Stan Siatkowski; Daniel Desnoyers; Cristian Smith	Mexico: Rubén Ramírez; Luis Beristáin; Carlos Roldan
1983	United States: Darrell Pace; Richard McKinney; Edwin Eliason	Canada: Roger Lemay; Daniel Desnoyers; Eric Amon	Mexico: Carlos Moza; Adolfo González; Javier Rivera
1987	United States: Richard McKinney; Jay Barrs; Darrell Pace	Mexico: Andrés Anchondo; Adolfo González; Eduardo Padilla	Canada: Denis Canuel; David Viney; John McDonald
1991	United States: Eric Brumlow; Edwin Eliason; Darrell Pace	Mexico: Eduardo Messmacher; Ricardo Rojas; Andrés Anchondo	Cuba: Miguel Leon; Waldo Suarez; Alfonso Donate
1995	United States: Edwin Eliason; Richard McKinney; Vic Wunderle	Argentina: Pablo Basgall; Marcelo Cavagliato; Marcelo Grillo	Canada: Rob Rusnov; Jeannot Robitaille; Kevin Sally
1999	United States: Butch Johnson; Jason McKittrick; Vic Wunderle	Canada: David Dalziel; Shawn Riggs; Rob Rusnov	Cuba: Juan Carlos Stevens; Ismely Arias; Yasell Allue Ochoa
2003	United States: Guy Krueger; Glenn Meyers; Vic Wunderle	Mexico: Jorge Chapoy; Juan René Serrano; Eduardo Velez	El Salvador: Cristóbal Merlos; Ricardo Merlos; Miguel Veliz
2007	United States: Brady Ellison; Butch Johnson; Vic Wunderle	Canada: Crispin Duenas; Jason Lyon; Hugh MacDonald	Mexico: Jorge Chapoy; Juan René Serrano; Eduardo Vélez
2011	United States: Joe Fanchin; Brady Ellison; Jake Kaminski	Mexico: Juan René Serrano; Eduardo Vélez; Pedro Vivas	Cuba: Juan Carlos Stevens; Hugo Franco; Jaime Quintana
2015	Mexico: Juan René Serrano; Ernesto Boardman; Luis Álvarez	United States: Zach Garrett; Brady Ellison; Collin Klimitchek	Brazil: Marcus D'Almeida; Bernardo Oliveira; Daniel Xavier
2019	Canada: Crispin Duenas; Brian Maxwell; Eric Peters	Chile: Andrés Aguilar; Juan Painevil; Ricardo Soto	United States: Brady Ellison; Thomas Stanwood; Jack Williams
2023	United States: Brady Ellison; Jackson Mirich; Jack Williams	Mexico: Carlos Rojas; Matias Grande; Caleb Urbina	Brazil: Marcus D'Almeida; Matheus Gomes; Matheus Ely

=== Women's Recurve Individual ===
Event	Gold	Silver	Bronze
1979	Lynette Johnson; United States	Carol Strausburg; United States	Joan McDonald; Canada
1983	Ruth Rowe; United States	Deborah Ochs; United States	Linda Kazienko; Canada
1987	Denise Parker; United States	Trena King; United States	Eva Bueno; Cuba
1991	Denise Parker; United States	Jennifer O'Donnell; United States	Aurora Bretón; Mexico
1995	Janet Dykman; United States	Vic Wunderle; United States	Marisol Bretón; Mexico
1999	Yaremis Pérez; Cuba	Denisse van Lamoen; Chile	Denise Parker; United States
2003	Jennifer Nichols; United States	Claudia Lissette Landaverde; El Salvador	Stephanie Miller; United States
2007	Jennifer Nichols; United States	Aída Román; Mexico	Ana Rendón; Colombia
2011	Alejandra Valencia; Mexico	Miranda Leek; United States	Aída Román; Mexico
2015	Khatuna Lorig; United States	Ana Rendón; Colombia	Karla Hinojosa; Mexico
2019	Alejandra Valencia; Mexico	Khatuna Lorig; United States	Casey Kaufhold; United States
2023	Alejandra Valencia; Mexico	Ana Clara Machado; Brazil	Casey Kaufhold; United States

=== Women's Recurve Team ===
Event	Gold	Silver	Bronze
1979	United States: Lynette Johnson; Carol Strausburg; Judi Adams	Canada: Joan McDonald; Linda Kazienko; Marie Pitre	Brazil: Arci Kempner; Claudia Nunez; Daisy Schmidt
1983	United States: Ruth Rowe; Deborah Ochs; Luann Ryon	Canada: Linda Kazienko; Lucille Lemay; Rose Baker	Brazil: Martha Emilio; Claudia Vasques; Angela Fernandez
1987	United States: Denise Parker; Trena King; Michelle Borders	Mexico: Aurora Bretón; María Fernández; Ofelia Avila	Cuba: Eva L. Bueno; Jackeline Fiffe; Maria Cueto
1991	United States: Kitty Frazier; Jennifer O'Donnell; Denise Parker	Mexico: Aurora Bretón; Alejandra Garcia; Mirian Veliz	Cuba: Jackeline Fiffe; Eva L. Bueno; Yunisbel Gonzalez
1995	United States: Janet Dykman; Denise Parker; Ruth Rowe	Cuba: Jacquelin Fernandez; Yusnilda Garcia Torres; Lorelys Lorenzo	Canada: Veronique Dufour; Caroline Lebrecque; Sylvie Plante
1999	United States: Janet Dykman; Katie Loesch; Denise Parker	Cuba: Milena Ferro Mariyon; Yaremis Pérez; Adia Zamora	Mexico: Belle Amador; Marisol Bretón; Erika Reyes
2003	United States: Janet Dykman; Stephanie Miller; Jennifer Nichols	Mexico: Marisol Bretón; Zelma Novelo; Erika Reyes	Venezuela: Leidys Brito; Vanessa Chacón; Rosanna Rosario
2007	Colombia: Ana Rendón; Sigrid Romero; Natalia Sánchez	Canada: Marie-Pier Beaudet; Kristen Niles; Kateri Vrakking	United States: Jennifer Nichols; Lindsey Pian; Karen Scavotto
2011	Mexico: Aída Román; Alejandra Valencia; Mariana Avitia	United States: Khatuna Lorig; Miranda Leek; Heather Koehl	Cuba: Maydenia Sarduy; Orquidea Quesada; Larissa Pagan
2015	Colombia: Ana Rendón; Natalia Sánchez; Maira Sepúlveda	Mexico: Karla Hinojosa; Aída Román; Alejandra Valencia	United States: Ariel Gibilaro; Khatuna Lorig; La Nola Pritchard
2019	United States: Casey Kaufhold; Khatuna Lorig; Erin Mickelberry	Mexico: Mariana Avitia; Aída Román; Alejandra Valencia	Colombia: Valentina Acosta; Ana Rendón; Maira Sepúlveda
2023	United States: Catalina GNoriega; Jennifer Mucino-Fernandez; Casey Kaufhold	Mexico: Aída Román; Angela Ruiz; Alejandra Valencia	Colombia: Ana Rendón; Maira Sepúlveda; Carolina Posada

=== Mixed Recurve Team ===
Event	Gold	Silver	Bronze
2019	United States; Casey Kaufhold; Brady Ellison	Colombia; Ana Rendón; Daniel Pineda	Mexico; Alejandra Valencia; Ángel Alvarado
2023	United States; Casey Kaufhold; Brady Ellison	Brazil; Ana Machado; Marcus D'Almeida	Mexico; Alejandra Valencia; Matias Grande

=== Men's Compound Individual ===
Event	Gold	Silver	Bronze
2019	Roberto Hernández; El Salvador	Braden Gellenthien; United States	Daniel Muñoz; Colombia
2023	Jean Pizarro; Puerto Rico	Sawyer Sullivan; United States	Jagdeep Singh; Colombia

=== Men's Compound Team ===
Event	Gold	Silver	Bronze
2023	El Salvador; Roberto Hernández; Douglas Nolasco	United States; Kris Schaff; Sawyer Sullivan	Colombia; Sebastián Arenas; Jagdeep Singh

=== Women's Compound Individual ===
Event	Gold	Silver	Bronze
2019	Sara López; Colombia	Andrea Becerra; Mexico	Paige Pearce; United States
2023	Dafne Quintero; Mexico	Alexis Ruiz; United States	Alejandra Usquiano; Colombia

=== Women's Compound Team ===
Event	Gold	Silver	Bronze
2023	United States; Olivia Dean; Alexis Ruiz	Colombia; Sara López; Alejandra Usquiano	Mexico; Andrea Becerra; Dafne Quintero

=== Mixed Compound Team ===
Event	Gold	Silver	Bronze
2019	Argentina; María González; Ivan Nikolajuk	Guatemala; María Zebadúa; José del Cid	Colombia; Sara López; Daniel Muñoz
2023	Colombia; Sara López; Jagdeep Singh	United States; Kris Schaff; Alexis Ruiz	Mexico; Dafne Quintero; Sebastian Garcia

== Discontinued Events ==
=== Men's Recurve – 30 Meters ===
Event	Gold	Silver	Bronze
1983	Jerry Pylypchuk; United States	Richard McKinney; United States	Alfonso Donate; Cuba
1991	Edwin Eliason; United States	Jay Barrs; United States	Ricardo Rojas; Mexico
1995	Vic Wunderle; United States	Edwin Eliason; United States	Rob Rusnov; Canada

=== Men's Recurve – 50 Meters ===
Event	Gold	Silver	Bronze
1983	Darrell Pace; United States	Jerry Pylypchuk; United States	Carlos Mesa; Mexico
1991	Eric Brumlow; United States	Miguel León; Cuba	Ricardo Rojas; Mexico
1995	Vic Wunderle; United States	Edwin Eliason; United States	Rob Rusnov; Canada

=== Men's Recurve – 70 Meters ===
Event	Gold	Silver	Bronze
1983	Edwin Eliason; United States	Darrell Pace; United States	Emilio Dutra e Mello; Brazil
1991	Darrell Pace; United States	Eric Brumlow; United States	Eduardo Messmacher; Mexico
1995	Rob Rusnov; Canada	Butch Johnson; United States	Edwin Eliason; United States

=== Men's Recurve – 90 Meters ===
Event	Gold	Silver	Bronze
1983	Darrell Pace; United States	Richard McKinney; United States	Daniel Desnoyers; Canada
1991	Eric Brumlow; United States	Jay Barrs; United States	Ricardo Rojas; Mexico
1995	Rob Rusnov; Canada	Jeannot Robitaille; Canada	Pablo Blasgall; Argentina

=== Women's Recurve – 30 Meters ===
Event	Gold	Silver	Bronze
1983	Luann Ryon; United States	Ruth Rowe; United States	Linda Kazienko; Canada
1991	Denise Parker; United States	Kitty Frazier; United States	Aurora Bretón; Mexico
1995	Denise Parker; United States	Janet Dykman; United States	María Reyes; Puerto Rico

=== Women's Recurve – 50 Meters ===
Event	Gold	Silver	Bronze
1983	Deborah Ochs; United States	Luann Ryon; United States	Linda Kazienko; Canada
1991	Janet Dykman; United States	Denise Parker; United States	Miriam Véliz; Mexico
1995	Denise Parker; United States	Janet Dykman; United States	Marisol Bretón; Mexico

=== Women's Recurve – 60 Meters ===
Event	Gold	Silver	Bronze
1983	Ruth Rowe; United States	Deborah Ochs; United States	Aurora Bretón; Mexico
1991	Denise Parker; United States	Jennifer O'Donnell; United States	Alejandra García; Mexico
1995	Denise Parker; United States	Ruth Rowe; United States	Marisol Bretón; Mexico

=== Women's Recurve – 70 Meters ===
Event	Gold	Silver	Bronze
1983	Ruth Rowe; United States	Deborah Ochs; United States	Aurora Bretón; Mexico
1991	Denise Parker; United States	Kitty Frazier; United States	Aurora Bretón; Mexico
1995	Jacquelin Fernández; Cuba	Denise Parker; United States	Marisol Bretón; Mexico
