= Archery at the 1988 Summer Olympics – Men's team =

Archery at the Olympics

Men's team at the Games of the XXIV Olympiad
- Venue: Hwarang Archery Field
- Dates: 27 September – 1 October 1988
- Competitors: 66 from 22 nations

Medalists
1st place, gold medalist(s)		Park Sung-soo; Chun In-soo; Lee Han-sup	South Korea
2nd place, silver medalist(s)		Jay Barrs; Richard McKinney; Darrell Pace	United States
3rd place, bronze medalist(s)		Leroy Watson; Steven Hallard; Richard Priestman	Great Britain

A total of 22 nations competed in the men's team event at the 1988 Summer Olympics as part of the archery programme. The ranking round score for a team was the sum of the three scores earned by the individual archers in the individual ranking round. The top twelve nations competed in the semifinals, with the top eight advancing to the finals.

Semifinal

In a surprise, the Korean team fell all the way to sixth place in the semifinal. The United States and Soviet Union each moved up one place into the top two, while Chinese Taipei gave a strong showing in third place. Britain also moved up substantially in the ranking.

Final

Korea returned to top form in the final, making full use of the clean slate that each round afforded to win the gold medal. The Americans continued to shoot well, but were unable to keep up with the Koreans, taking home the silver. The Soviets and the Chinese Taipei team both fell out of medal contention, while Britain continued its climb right up into the bronze medal win.

== Result ==
Rank	Nation	Archer	Open round	Rank	Semifinal	Rank	Grand final
1st place, gold medalist(s)	South Korea	Chun In-soo; Lee Han-sup; Park Sung-soo	3862	1	960	6	986
2nd place, silver medalist(s)	United States	Jay Barrs; Richard McKinney; Darrell Pace	3839	2	992	1	972
3rd place, bronze medalist(s)	Great Britain	Steven Hallard; Richard Priestman; Leroy Watson	3733	8	965	4	968
4	Finland	Ismo Falck; Tomi Poikolainen; Pentti Vikstrom	3797	4	960	7	956
5	Soviet Union	Kostiantyn Shkolniy; Vladimir Yesheyev; Juri Leontiev	3799	3	976	2	949
6	Japan	Terushi Furuhashi; Takayoshi Matsushita; Hiroshi Yamamoto	3766	5	958	8	948
7	Chinese Taipei	Chiu Ping-kun; Hu Pei-Wen; Yen Man-Sung	3693	11	968	3	937
8	Sweden	Gert Bjerendal; Göran Bjerendal; Mats Nordlander	3759	6	964	5	925
9	Italy	Ilario Di Buò; Giancarlo Ferrari; Andrea Parenti	3733	7	957	9	–
10	France	Claude Franclet; Olivier Heck; Thierry Venant	3691	12	948	10	–
11	Denmark	Niels Gammelgaard; Jan Jacobsen; Henrik Toft	3714	9	938	11	–
12	Mexico	José Anchondo; Omar Bustani; Adolfo González	3695	10	917	12	–
13	Australia	Christopher Blake; Simon Fairweather; Rodney Wagner	3688	13	–	–	–
14	Turkey	Izzet Avci; Vedat Erbay; Kerem Ersu	3686	14	–	–	–
15	Belgium	Patrick de Koning; Francis Notenboom; Paul Vermeiren	3684	15	–	–	–
16	Canada	Denis Canuel; Daniel Desnoyers; John McDonald	3679	16	–	–	–
17	Spain	Juan Holgado; Manuel Jiménez; Antonio Vázquez	3664	17	–	–	–
18	West Germany	Manfred Barth; Detlef Kahlert; Bernhard Schulkowski	3659	18	–	–	–
19	China	Duoji Qiuyun; Liang Qiuzhong; Ru Guang	3644	19	–	–	–
20	India	Limba Ram; Shyam Lal Meena; Sanjeeva Singh	3615	20	–	–	–
21	Zimbabwe	Paul Bamber; Alan Bryant; Wrex Tarr	3438	21	–	–	–
22	Bhutan	Thinley Dorji; Jigme Tshering; Pema Tshering	3338	22	–	–	–
