= Archery at the 1988 Summer Olympics – Men's individual =

Archery at the Olympics

Men's individual at the Games of the XXIV Olympiad
- Venue: Hwarang Archery Field
- Dates: 27–30 September 1988
- Competitors: 84 from 34 nations

Medalists
1st place, gold medalist(s)		Jay Barrs	United States
2nd place, silver medalist(s)		Park Sung-soo	South Korea
3rd place, bronze medalist(s)		Vladimir Yesheyev	Soviet Union

The men's individual was one of two events for men out of four total events in Archery at the 1988 Summer Olympics.

== Summary ==
Preliminary round

Each archer shot a FITA round, consisting of 144 arrows split evenly between the distances of 90 metres, 70 metres, 50 metres, and 30 metres. The top 24 archers advanced to the 1/8 finals.

The United States, winners of the men's gold medal every year they had competed, advanced all of their archers. Korea also had all three archers qualify for the next round. Finland, Japan, Great Britain, and the Soviet Union each had two archers advance. All three medallists from 1984 moved on to the next round.

1/8 final

Each archer shot one quarter of a FITA round, with the 36 arrows split evenly between the distances of 90 metres, 70 metres, 50 metres, and 30 metres. The top 18 archers advanced to the quarterfinal.

Korea and the United States again advanced all three archers. Finland and Japan were the nations having two archers qualify. The three medallists from 1984 continued to compete, though Darrell Pace of the United States, gold medallist in Los Angeles, only barely managed to take 18th place to advance.

Quarterfinal

Each archer shot one quarter of a FITA round, with the 36 arrows split evenly between the distances of 90 metres, 70 metres, 50 metres, and 30 metres. The top 12 archers advanced to the semifinal.

Once again, the six Korean and American archers advanced, along with two Finnish archers. Pace, who won gold four years earlier, sprang from near-elimination in the 1/8 final to first place in the quarterfinal. It was bronze medal defender Hiroshi Yamamoto that barely escaped elimination in this round.

Semifinal

Each archer shot one quarter of a FITA round, with the 36 arrows split evenly between the distances of 90 metres, 70 metres, 50 metres, and 30 metres. The top 8 archers advanced to the final.

One archer from each of the three nations with multiple archers fell in this round, leaving Korea and the United States with two archers advancing as Finland joined the Soviet Union, the Netherlands, and Japan in qualifying one archer for the final. Pace, the defending gold medallist, missed the cut by one place. Yamamoto, the defending silver medallist, avoided that fate by shooting two points better than Pace to place eighth.

Final

The top three archers in the final earned medals. Each archer shot one quarter of a FITA round, with the 36 arrows split evenly between the distances of 90 metres, 70 metres, 50 metres, and 30 metres.

The United States and Korea, having vied for dominance throughout the competition, won a gold and silver medal, respectively. This continued the American men's streak of winning a gold medal in every men's archery competition in which they had taken part. The Soviet Union also earned a medal. McKinney and Yamamoto, the remaining defending medallists, placed only 6th and 8th, respectively.

== Results ==
Rank	Archer	Nation	Open round	Rank	Eighth final	Rank	Quarter final	Rank	Semi final	Rank	Grand final
1st place, gold medalist(s)	Jay Barrs	United States	1294	3	313	13	326	4	334	2	338
2nd place, silver medalist(s)	Park Sung-soo	South Korea	1303	2	322	4	324	5	329	4	336
3rd place, bronze medalist(s)	Vladimir Yesheyev	Soviet Union	1304	1	313	14	320	9	328	5	335
4	Chun In-soo	South Korea	1284	6	326	2	323	6	334	1	331
5	Martinus Reniers	Netherlands	1286	5	328	1	328	2	324	8	327
6	Richard McKinney	United States	1288	4	321	6	327	3	332	3	324
7	Pentti Vikström	Finland	1273	13	312	15	320	10	324	7	323
8	Hiroshi Yamamoto	Japan	1271	14	316	7	318	12	324	6	321
9	Darrell Pace	United States	1257	19	306	18	329	1	322	9	–
10	Lee Han-sup	South Korea	1275	12	314	10	320	11	321	10	–
11	Tomi Poikolainen	Finland	1278	9	315	9	323	7	321	11	–
12	Detlef Kahlert	West Germany	1254	20	307	17	321	8	311	12	–
13	Ilario Di Buò	Italy	1251	21	322	5	317	13	–	–	–
14	Takayoshi Matsushita	Japan	1266	15	311	16	316	14	–	–	–
15	Göran Bjerendal	Sweden	1280	8	315	8	316	15	–	–	–
16	Simon Fairweather	Australia	1276	11	322	3	316	16	–	–	–
17	Paul Vermeiren	Belgium	1250	22	313	12	309	17	–	–	–
18	Leroy Watson	Great Britain	1248	24	314	11	304	18	–	–	–
19	Olivier Heck	France	1277	10	306	19	–	–	–	–	–
20	Kostiantyn Shkolniy	Soviet Union	1250	23	304	20	–	–	–	–	–
21	Steven Hallard	Great Britain	1283	7	303	21	–	–	–	–	–
22	Vedat Erbay	Turkey	1257	18	302	22	–	–	–	–	–
23	Henrik Kromann Toft	Denmark	1263	17	295	23	–	–	–	–	–
24	John McDonald	Canada	1263	16	292	24	–	–	–	–	–
25	Jan Jacobsen	Denmark	1248	25	–	–	–	–	–	–	–
26	Andrés Anchondo	Mexico	1248	26	–	–	–	–	–	–	–
27	Ismo Falck	Finland	1246	27	–	–	–	–	–	–	–
28	Andrea Parenti	Italy	1245	28	–	–	–	–	–	–	–
29	Yury Leontyev	Soviet Union	1245	29	–	–	–	–	–	–	–
30	Mats Nordlander	Sweden	1243	30	–	–	–	–	–	–	–
31	Hu Pei-wen	Chinese Taipei	1243	31	–	–	–	–	–	–	–
32	Antonio Vázquez	Spain	1239	32	–	–	–	–	–	–	–
33	Giancarlo Ferrari	Italy	1237	33	–	–	–	–	–	–	–
34	Kerem Ersü	Turkey	1237	34	–	–	–	–	–	–	–
35	Gert Bjerendal	Sweden	1236	35	–	–	–	–	–	–	–
36	Sanjeev Singh	India	1233	36	–	–	–	–	–	–	–
37	Thierry Venant	France	1233	37	–	–	–	–	–	–	–
38	Omar Bustani	Mexico	1232	38	–	–	–	–	–	–	–
39	Limba Ram	India	1232	39	–	–	–	–	–	–	–
40	Terushi Furuhashi	Japan	1229	40	–	–	–	–	–	–	–
41	Christopher Blake	Australia	1228	41	–	–	–	–	–	–	–
42	Yen Man-sung	Chinese Taipei	1227	42	–	–	–	–	–	–	–
43	Renato Emilio	Brazil	1225	43	–	–	–	–	–	–	–
44	Patrick de Koning	Belgium	1225	44	–	–	–	–	–	–	–
45	Chiu Ping-kun	Chinese Taipei	1223	45	–	–	–	–	–	–	–
46	Duoji Qiuyun	China	1220	46	–	–	–	–	–	–	–
47	Liang Qiuzhong	China	1220	47	–	–	–	–	–	–	–
48	Safruddin Mawi	Indonesia	1219	48	–	–	–	–	–	–	–
49	Adolfo González	Mexico	1215	49	–	–	–	–	–	–	–
50	Manuel Jiménez	Spain	1215	50	–	–	–	–	–	–	–
51	Daniel Desnoyers	Canada	1215	51	–	–	–	–	–	–	–
52	Juan Holgado	Spain	1210	52	–	–	–	–	–	–	–
53	Francis Notenboom	Belgium	1209	53	–	–	–	–	–	–	–
54	Manfred Barth	West Germany	1206	54	–	–	–	–	–	–	–
55	Ru Guang	China	1204	55	–	–	–	–	–	–	–
56	Ole Gammelgaard Nielsen	Denmark	1203	56	–	–	–	–	–	–	–
57	Richard Priestman	Great Britain	1202	57	–	–	–	–	–	–	–
58	Denis Canuel	Canada	1201	58	–	–	–	–	–	–	–
59	Bernhard Schulkowski	West Germany	1199	59	–	–	–	–	–	–	–
60	Paul Bamber	Zimbabwe	1197	60	–	–	–	–	–	–	–
61	Izzet Avci	Turkey	1192	61	–	–	–	–	–	–	–
62	Jorge Azevedo	Brazil	1191	62	–	–	–	–	–	–	–
63	Rodney Wagner	Australia	1184	63	–	–	–	–	–	–	–
64	Claude Franclet	France	1181	64	–	–	–	–	–	–	–
65	Gilles Cresto	Monaco	1180	65	–	–	–	–	–	–	–
66	Carlos Reis	Portugal	1176	66	–	–	–	–	–	–	–
67	Miguel Pedraza	Puerto Rico	1172	67	–	–	–	–	–	–	–
68	Rowel Merto	Philippines	1162	68	–	–	–	–	–	–	–
69	Joseph Malone	Ireland	1162	69	–	–	–	–	–	–	–
70	Rui Santos	Portugal	1160	70	–	–	–	–	–	–	–
71	Shyam Lal Meena	India	1150	71	–	–	–	–	–	–	–
72	Alan Bryant	Zimbabwe	1149	72	–	–	–	–	–	–	–
73	Thinley Dorji	Bhutan	1144	73	–	–	–	–	–	–	–
74	Noel Lynch	Ireland	1141	74	–	–	–	–	–	–	–
75	Claudio Pafundi	Argentina	1126	75	–	–	–	–	–	–	–
76	Pema Tshering	Bhutan	1124	76	–	–	–	–	–	–	–
77	Fok Ming Shan	Hong Kong	1108	77	–	–	–	–	–	–	–
78	Wrex Tarr	Zimbabwe	1092	78	–	–	–	–	–	–	–
79	Lai Chi Hung	Hong Kong	1079	79	–	–	–	–	–	–	–
80	Jigme Tshering	Bhutan	1070	80	–	–	–	–	–	–	–
81	Ángel Bello	Argentina	1017	81	–	–	–	–	–	–	–
82	Sameer Jawdat	Saudi Arabia	964	82	–	–	–	–	–	–	–
83	Adel Aljabrin	Saudi Arabia	921	83	–	–	–	–	–	–	–
84	Derrick Tenai	Solomon Islands	505	84	–	–	–	–	–	–	–
