= Archery at the 1987 Pan American Games – Men's team =

Archery – Men's team at the 1987 Pan American Games
- Venue: Eagle Creek Park
- Winning score: 952

Medalists
Gold medal	Richard McKinney; Jay Barrs; Darrell Pace	United States
Silver medal	Andrés Anchondo; Adolfo González; Eduardo Padilla	Mexico
Bronze medal	David Viney; John McDonald; Denis Canuel	Canada

The men's team competition of the archery events at the 1987 Pan American Games was held at the Eagle Creek Park. The defending Pan American Games champion was the team of the United States.

== Results ==
Rank	Nation	Archers	Score	Note
1st place, gold medalist(s)	United States	Richard McKinney	952	
1st place, gold medalist(s)	United States	Jay Barrs	952	
1st place, gold medalist(s)	United States	Darrell Pace	952	
2nd place, silver medalist(s)	Mexico	Andrés Anchondo	911	
2nd place, silver medalist(s)	Mexico	Adolfo González	911	
2nd place, silver medalist(s)	Mexico	Eduardo Padilla	911	
3rd place, bronze medalist(s)	Canada	David Viney	872	
3rd place, bronze medalist(s)	Canada	John McDonald	872	
3rd place, bronze medalist(s)	Canada	Denis Canuel	872	
4	Venezuela	Roberto Pasquini	865	
4	Venezuela	Pietro Pannarale	865	
4	Venezuela	Pablo García	865	
5	Argentina	Pedro Grillo	819	
5	Argentina	Claudio Pafundi	819	
5	Argentina	Ángel Bello	819	
6	Brazil	Renato Emílio	806	
6	Brazil	Jorge Azevedo	806	
6	Brazil	Silvio Germano	806	
7	Puerto Rico	Miguel Pedraza	791	
7	Puerto Rico	Wilson Ramírez	791	
7	Puerto Rico	Emigdio Delestre	791	
