= Archery at the 1987 Pan American Games – Men's individual =

Archery – Men's individual at the 1987 Pan American Games
- Venue: Eagle Creek Park
- Winning score: 329

Medalists
Gold medal	Jay Barrs	United States
Silver medal	Denis Canuel	Canada
Bronze medal	Darrell Pace	United States

The men's individual competition of the archery events at the 1987 Pan American Games was held at the Eagle Creek Park. The defending Pan American Games champion was Darrell Pace of the United States.

== Results ==
Rank	Archer	Nation	Score	Note
1st place, gold medalist(s)	Jay Barrs	United States	329	
2nd place, silver medalist(s)	Denis Canuel	Canada	321	won shootoff
3rd place, bronze medalist(s)	Darrell Pace	United States	321	
4	Adolfo González	Mexico	309	
5	Juan Echavarría	Colombia	305	
6	Roberto Pasquini	Venezuela	304	
7	Cesar Escalante	Argentina	295	
8	Andrés Anchondo	Mexico	293	
