= Archery at the 1987 Pan American Games – Women's team =

Archery – Women's team at the 1987 Pan American Games
- Venue: Eagle Creek Park
- Competitors: 15 from 5 nations
- Winning score: 889

Medalists
Gold medal	Denise Parker; Trena King; Michelle Borders	United States
Silver medal	Aurora Bretón; María Fernández; Ofelia Avila	Mexico
Bronze medal	Eva Bueno; Jackeline Fiffe; María Cueto	Cuba

The women's team competition of the archery events at the 1987 Pan American Games was held at the Eagle Creek Park. The defending Pan American Games champion was the team of the United States.

== Results ==
Rank	Nation	Archers	Score	Note
1st place, gold medalist(s)	United States	Denise Parker	889	
1st place, gold medalist(s)	United States	Trena King	889	
1st place, gold medalist(s)	United States	Michelle Borders	889	
2nd place, silver medalist(s)	Mexico	Aurora Bretón	829	
2nd place, silver medalist(s)	Mexico	María Fernández	829	
2nd place, silver medalist(s)	Mexico	Ofelia Avila	829	
3rd place, bronze medalist(s)	Cuba	Eva Bueno	812	
3rd place, bronze medalist(s)	Cuba	Jackeline Fiffe	812	
3rd place, bronze medalist(s)	Cuba	María Cueto	812	
4	Puerto Rico	Gloria Rosa	788	
4	Puerto Rico	Ruth González	788	
4	Puerto Rico	Irma Rivera	788	
5	Brazil	Marta Emílio	776	
5	Brazil	Arci Kempner	776	
5	Brazil	Ada Nunes	776	
