= Archery at the 1983 Pan American Games =

- Dates: August, 1983

Archery at the 1983 Pan American Games was held in August 1983. The events took place at a temporary site in Caracas, Venezuela. Just like in the Olympics, the archery competition will be held using the recurve bow.

== Medal summary ==
=== Medal table ===
Rank	Nation	Gold	Silver	Bronze	Total
1	United States	12	10	0	22
2	Canada	0	2	4	6
3	Mexico	0	0	4	4
4	Brazil	0	0	3	3
5	Cuba	0	0	1	1
Totals (5 entries)		12	12	12	36

=== Events ===
Event	Gold	Silver	Bronze
Men's individual	Darrell Pace; United States	Richard McKinney; United States	Renato Emílio; Brazil
Men's recurve – 30 meters	Jerry Pylypchuk; United States	Richard McKinney; United States	Alfonso Donate; Cuba
Men's recurve – 50 meters	Darrell Pace; United States	Jerry Pylypchuk; United States	Carlos Mesa; Mexico
Men's recurve – 70 meters	Edwin Eliason; United States	Darrell Pace; United States	Renato Emílio; Brazil
Men's recurve – 90 meters	Darrell Pace; United States	Richard McKinney; United States	Daniel Desnoyers; Canada
Women's individual	Ruth Rowe; United States	Deborah Ochs; United States	Linda Kazienko; Canada
Women's recurve – 30 meters	Luann Ryon; United States	Ruth Rowe; United States	Linda Kazienko; Canada
Women's recurve – 50 meters	Deborah Ochs; United States	Luann Ryon; United States	Linda Kazienko; Canada
Women's recurve – 60 meters	Ruth Rowe; United States	Deborah Ochs; United States	Aurora Bretón; Mexico
Women's recurve – 70 meters	Ruth Rowe; United States	Deborah Ochs; United States	Aurora Bretón; Mexico
Men's team	United States	Canada	Mexico
Women's team	United States	Canada	Brazil

== See also ==
- Archery at the 1984 Summer Olympics
