= Joseph Malone =

Joseph or Joe Malone may refer to:

- Joseph R. Malone (born 1949), American politician
- Joseph Malone (VC) (1833–1883), VC recipient
- Joseph Malone (actor), an actor on the Tracy Ullman Show
- Joseph Malone (archer) (born 1957), Irish archer
- Joe Malone (footballer) (1924–2018), Australian rules footballer
- Joe Malone (1890–1969), member of the Hockey Hall of Fame
- Joe Malone (politician) (born 1954), Republican politician from Massachusetts

== See also ==
- Jo Malone (born 1963), British businesswoman
