= Steven Hallard =

British archer (born 1965)

Medal record

Men's archery

Representing Great Britain

Olympic Games
Bronze medal – third place	1988 Seoul	Team
Bronze medal – third place	1992 Barcelona	Team

Steven Leslie Hallard (born 22 February 1965 in Rugby, Warwickshire, England) is a British archer who was a member of the British squad that won the team bronze medals at the 1988 and 1992 Summer Olympics.

== Olympics ==
Hallard has competed for Great Britain at four Olympic Games. His first appearance came in 1984 in Los Angeles where he shot a score of 2473 and finished in 21st position in the individual event.

At the 1988 Olympics in Seoul a new elimination format was introduced for archery events. In the individual event Hallard ranked 7th in the preliminary round to qualify for the next round but was knocked out of the competition following a 21st-place finish in the 1/8 final. For the first time in Olympic competition a team event was also held. Hallard was part of the British team that also included Richard Priestman and Leroy Watson. Ranked eighth after scores from the individual preliminary round were carried over Britain advanced to the semifinal where they improved four places to qualify for the final in fourth place. A final round team score of 968 meant Britain won the bronze medal behind hosts Korea and the United States. This was the first Olympic archery medal won for Britain since the 1908 Games where five medals, including two gold, were won by British archers.

In 1992 Hallard and Priestman were joined in the team event by teenager Simon Terry. The competition now took the form of a ranking round followed by a knock-out tournament. The British team scored 3833 and lay 6th after the ranking round. Victories over Germany in the round of 16 and Australia in the quarter-final earned them a semi final against host nation Spain. Britain were defeated 236-234 but then beat France in a playoff to win the bronze medal.

In the individual event Hallard scored 1285 and qualified for the knock-out stages as the 23rd seed. In the round of 32 he defeated Denmark's Ole Gammelgaard but was beaten in the last 16 by Martinus Grov of Norway by a score of 104-99. Grov went on to reach the semi-finals and finished fourth after losing the bronze medal shoot-off to Britain's Simon Terry.

His final appearance at the Olympics came at the 1996 Games in Atlanta. Competing in the individual event only Hallard was seeded 55th following the ranking round and was beaten in the round of 32 by Tommi Tuovila.

== See also ==
- Great Britain at the 1984 Summer Olympics
- Great Britain at the 1988 Summer Olympics
- Great Britain at the 1992 Summer Olympics
- Great Britain at the 1996 Summer Olympics
