= Archery at the 1995 Pan American Games =

- Venue: Villa Marista
- Start date: 15 March 1995
- End date: 19 March 2023
- No. of events: 12 (6 men, 6 women)
- Competitors: 47 from 9 nations

Archery competitions at the 1995 Pan American Games in Mar del Plata, Argentina were held between 15 March and 19 March 1995 at Villa Marista.

== Participating nations ==
A total of 9 countries qualified archers.

- Argentina (8)
- Brazil (6)
- Canada (7)
- Chile (1)
- Cuba (8)
- Mexico (6)
- Paraguay (2)
- Puerto Rico (1)
- United States (8)

== Medal summary ==
=== Medal table ===
* Host nation (Argentina)

Rank	NOC's	Gold	Silver	Bronze	Total
1	United States	9	9	1	19
2	Canada	2	1	5	8
3	Cuba	1	1	0	2
4	Argentina*	0	1	1	2
5	Mexico	0	0	4	4
6	Puerto Rico	0	0	1	1
Totals (6 entries)		12	12	12	36

=== Medalists ===
Event	Gold	Silver	Bronze
Men's individual	United States; Edwin Eliason	United States; Vic Wunderle	Canada; Rob Rusnov
Men's individual 90m	Canada; Rob Rusnov	Canada; Jeannot Robitaille	Argentina; Pablo Basgall
Men's individual 70m	Canada; Rob Rusnov	United States; Butch Johnson	United States; Edwin Eliason
Men's individual 50m	United States; Vic Wunderle	United States; Edwin Eliason	United States; Butch Johnson
Men's individual 30m	United States; Vic Wunderle	United States; Edwin Eliason	United States; Butch Johnson
Men's team	United States; Edwin Eliason; Butch Johnson; Vic Wunderle	Argentina; Marcelo Grillo; Pablo Basgall; Enrique Cutiño	Canada; Rob Rusnov; Jeannot Robitaille; Kevin Sally
Women's individual	United States; Janet Dykman	United States; Ruth Rowe	United States; Denise Parker
Women's individual 70m	Cuba; Jacquelin Fernández	United States; Denise Parker	Mexico; Marisol Bretón
Women's individual 60m	United States; Denise Parker	United States; Ruth Rowe	Mexico; Marisol Bretón
Women's individual 50m	United States; Denise Parker	United States; Janet Dykman	Mexico; Marisol Bretón
Women's individual 30m	United States; Denise Parker	United States; Janet Dykman	Puerto Rico; María Reyes
Women's team	United States; Denise Parker; Janet Dykman; Ruth Rowe	Cuba; Jacquelin Fernández; Yusnilda García Torres; Lorelys Lorenzo	Canada; Sylvie Plante; Caroline Labrecque; Veronic Dufour

== See also ==
- Archery at the 1996 Summer Olympics
