= Safruddin Mawi =

Indonesian archer (born 1964)

Personal information
- Nationality: Indonesian
- Born: 13 June 1964 (age 60)

Sport
- Sport: Archery

Safruddin Mawi (born 13 June 1964) is an Indonesian archer. He competed in the men's individual and team events at the 1988 Summer Olympics.
