= Manfred Barth =

German archer (born 1945)

Personal information
- Nationality: German
- Born: 31 August 1945 (age 79); Hamburg, Germany

Sport
- Sport: Archery

Manfred Barth (born 31 August 1945) is a German archer. He competed in the men's individual and team events at the 1988 Summer Olympics.
