= Rob Rusnov =

Canadian archer (born 1973)

Personal information
- Born: December 9, 1973 (age 52) Toronto, Ontario, Canada

Sport
- Sport: Archery
Medal record
Men's Archery
Representing Canada
Pan American Games
Gold medal – first place	1995 Mar del Plata	Individual (70 m)
Gold medal – first place	1995 Mar del Plata	Individual (90 m)
Bronze medal – third place	1995 Mar del Plata	Individual
Bronze medal – third place	1995 Mar del Plata	Individual (30 m)
Bronze medal – third place	1995 Mar del Plata	Individual (50 m)
Bronze medal – third place	1995 Mar del Plata	Team

Robert "Rob" Rusnov (born December 9, 1973) is a Serbian Canadian archer. He was born in Toronto, Ontario.

== Athletic career ==
Rusnov ranked first or second among Canadian archers every year from 1992 through 2000. As a competitor at the 1995 Pan American Games, he won two gold medals and three bronze medals. The next year, Rusnov was one of four archers involved in a shootout to determine the country's representative at the 1996 Summer Olympics in Atlanta. Kevin Sally won both the trial and the spot, but Rusnov was subsequently added to the team as a wild-card by the International Olympic Committee. The day before opening ceremonies, a third archer, Jeannot Robitaille, was also added to the field. At the Olympics, all three Canadians were eliminated in the first round of the individual event, and the team itself fared likewise in the team competition, losing to Ukraine's team by a score of 238–225.

Rusnov competed for Canada at the 1999 Pan American Games. He participated in another shootout, this one involving only two shooters, to determine Canada's representative at the 2000 Summer Olympics. There, he defeated David Dalziel, a close friend and former teammate from the 1999 Pan American Games. At the Olympics, he was again eliminated in the first round of the individual event.

== Personal life ==
A resident of Toronto, Ontario, Rusnov studied engineering at Ryerson Polytechnic University.

Now he works with a trucking company.
