= Pentti Vikström =

Finnish archer (born 1951)

Personal information
- Nationality: Finnish
- Born: 9 December 1951 (age 73); Oulainen, Finland

Sport
- Sport: Archery

Pentti Vikström (born 9 December 1951) is a Finnish archer. He competed in the men's individual and team events at the 1988 Summer Olympics. Vikström is a mathematics lecturer by profession. Together with Veikko Virra, he has written the book Jousiampujan ABC, published in 2009.
