= Hu Pei-wen =

Taiwanese archer

Personal information
- Nationality: Taiwanese
- Born: 8 October 1950 (age 74)

Sport
- Sport: Archery

Hu Pei-wen (born 8 October 1950) is a Taiwanese archer. He competed in the men's individual and team events at the 1988 Summer Olympics.
