= Archery at the 1988 Summer Olympics =

Archery at the Games of the XXIV Olympiad
- Venue: Hwarang Archery Field
- Dates: 27 September – 1 October 1988
- No. of events: 4 (2 men, 2 women)
- Competitors: 146 from 41 nations

Four events were contested in archery at the 1988 Summer Olympics in Seoul. These events included team competitions for the first time in modern Olympic archery. Men's and women's individual competitions continued to be part of the schedule as well.

The format for the individual competition was altered for the first time since the 1972 Summer Olympics. In Seoul, instead of all archers using the double FITA round to determine rankings, a sort of elimination plan was introduced. Each archer shot a single FITA round to determine initial rankings. Most archers were cut from the competition after this, with only 24 advancing. These archers then shot one-fourth the number of arrows normal for a FITA round, with these scores being used to drop more archers. This process was repeated until only 8 archers finished the fourth segment of the second round.

== Competition format ==
=== Individual ===
84 archers competed in the men's individual competition while 62 competed in the women's event with a maximum of 3 athletes from each country in each event. A preliminary ranking round was held where each archer shot a single FITA round. The top 24 ranked archers from the preliminary round advanced to eighth-final. In this round archers shot one-fourth the number of arrows normal for a FITA round with the top 18 advancing to the quarterfinals. The top 12 archers from the quarterfinals advanced to the semifinals where only the top 8 advanced to the final.

=== Team ===
Each country that had three archers in the individual competition may also compete in the team competition. In the first round the archers shot a single FITA round with the top 12 teams advancing to the semifinal. The top 8 teams from the semifinal advanced to the final.

== Medal summary ==
=== Events ===
Event	Gold	Silver	Bronze
Men's individual	Jay Barrs; United States	Park Sung-soo; South Korea	Vladimir Yesheyev; Soviet Union
Men's team	South Korea; Chun In-soo; Lee Han-sup; Park Sung-soo	United States; Jay Barrs; Richard McKinney; Darrell Pace	Great Britain; Steven Hallard; Richard Priestman; Leroy Watson
Women's individual	Kim Soo-nyung; South Korea	Wang Hee-kyung; South Korea	Yun Young-sook; South Korea
Women's team	South Korea; Kim Soo-nyung; Wang Hee-kyung; Yun Young-sook	Indonesia; Lilies Handayani; Nurfitriyana Saiman; Kusuma Wardhani	United States; Deborah Ochs; Denise Parker; Melanie Skillman

=== Medal table ===
Rank	Nation	Gold	Silver	Bronze	Total
1	South Korea	3	2	1	6
2	United States	1	1	1	3
3	Indonesia	0	1	0	1
4	Great Britain	0	0	1	1
4	Soviet Union	0	0	1	1
Totals (5 entries)		4	4	4	12

== Participating nations ==
Nation	Men's Individual	Men's Team	Women's Individual	Women's Team	Total
Argentina	2	0	0	0	2
Australia	3	X	0	0	3
Belgium	3	X	0	0	3
Bhutan	3	X	0	0	3
Brazil	2	0	0	0	2
Canada	3	X	1	0	4
China	3	X	3	X	6
Chinese Taipei	3	X	3	X	6
Denmark	3	X	0	0	3
Finland	3	X	3	X	6
France	3	X	3	X	6
Great Britain	3	X	3	X	6
Hong Kong	2	0	1	0	3
India	3	X	0	0	3
Indonesia	1	0	3	X	4
Ireland	2	0	1	0	3
Italy	3	X	0	0	3
Japan	3	X	3	X	6
Jordan	0	0	1	0	1
Luxembourg	0	0	1	0	1
Malta	0	0	1	0	1
Mexico	3	X	1	0	4
Monaco	1	0	0	0	1
Mongolia	0	0	3	X	3
Netherlands	1	0	2	0	3
New Zealand	0	0	1	0	1
Philippines	1	0	1	0	2
Poland	0	0	3	X	3
Portugal	2	0	1	0	3
Puerto Rico	1	0	1	0	2
Saudi Arabia	2	0	0	0	2
Solomon Islands	1	0	0	0	1
South Korea	3	X	3	X	6
Soviet Union	3	X	3	X	6
Spain	3	X	1	0	4
Sweden	3	X	3	X	6
Switzerland	0	0	2	0	2
Turkey	3	X	3	X	6
United States	3	X	3	X	6
West Germany	3	X	3	X	6
Zimbabwe	3	X	1	0	4
Total athletes	84	66	62	45	146
Total NOCs	34	22	30	15	41
