= Terushi Furuhashi =

Japanese archer (born 1952)

Personal information
- Nationality: Japanese
- Born: 6 February 1952 (age 74)

Sport
- Sport: Archery

Terushi Furuhashi (古橋照司, Furuhashi Terushi; born 6 February 1952) is a Japanese archer. He competed in the men's individual and team events at the 1988 Summer Olympics.
