= Olivier Heck =

French archer (born 1966)

Personal information
- Nationality: French
- Born: 29 June 1966 (age 60) Pau, France

Sport
- Sport: Archery

Olivier Heck (born 29 June 1966) is a French archer. He competed in the men's individual and team events at the 1988 Summer Olympics.
