= Kostiantyn Shkolniy =

Ukrainian archer (born 1961)

Personal information
- Nationality: Ukrainian
- Born: 3 February 1961 (age 64); Lviv, Ukraine

Sport
- Sport: Archery

Kostiantyn Shkolniy (born 3 February 1961) is a Ukrainian archer. He competed in the men's individual and team events at the 1988 Summer Olympics.
