= Claude Franclet =

French archer (born 1964)

Personal information
- Nationality: French
- Born: 23 June 1964 (age 60); Paris, France

Sport
- Sport: Archery

Claude Franclet (born 23 June 1964) is a French archer. He competed in the men's individual and team events at the 1988 Summer Olympics.
