= Duoji Qiuyun =

Chinese archer (born 1962)

Personal information
- Nationality: Chinese
- Born: 15 December 1962 (age 62)

Sport
- Sport: Archery

Duoji Qiuyun (born 15 December 1962) is a Chinese archer. He competed in the men's individual and team events at the 1988 Summer Olympics.
