= Glenn Meyers =

American archer (born 1961)

Personal information
- Full name: Glenn Lee Meyers
- Born: June 19, 1961 (age 65) Fremont, Michigan, U.S.
- Education: Arizona State University
- Height: 6 ft 0 in (183 cm)
- Weight: 185 lb (84 kg)
Medal record
Men's Archery
Representing United States
Pan American Games
Gold medal – first place	2003 Santo Domingo	Team

Glenn Lee Meyers (born June 19, 1961) is an American archer. He competed in the men's individual event at the 1984 Summer Olympics, where he placed 12th.

== Biography ==
A native of Fremont, Michigan, Meyers attended Arizona State University where he graduated with a degree in computer information systems.
