= Manuel Jiménez (archer) =

Spanish archer (1940–2017)

Personal information
- Nationality: Spanish
- Born: 2 February 1940
- Died: 27 September 2017 (aged 77)

Sport
- Sport: Archery

Manuel Jiménez (2 February 1940 – 27 September 2017) was a Spanish archer. He competed in the men's individual and team events at the 1988 Summer Olympics.
