= Rodney Wagner =

Australian archer (born 1955)

Personal information
- Nationality: Australian
- Born: 30 July 1955 (age 71)

Sport
- Sport: Archery

Rodney Wagner (born 30 July 1955) is an Australian archer. He competed in the men's individual and team events at the 1988 Summer Olympics.
