= Yun Young-sook =

South Korean archer (born 1971)

Medal record

Women's archery

Representing South Korea

Olympic Games
Gold medal – first place	1988 Seoul	Team
Bronze medal – third place	1988 Seoul	Individual

- Yun Young-sook
- Hangul: 윤영숙
- RR: Yun Yeongsuk
- MR: Yun Yŏngsuk

Yun Young-sook (born September 10, 1971) is a South Korean archer and Olympic champion. She competed at the 1988 Summer Olympics in Seoul, where she won a gold medal with the South Korean archery team, and also an individual bronze medal. She now coaches archers in the 88 Archery Academy.
