= Aurora Bretón =

Mexican archer (1950–2014)

Personal information
- Born: Gonzala Aurora Bretón Gómez; 10 January 1950 Mexico City, Mexico
- Died: 27 May 2014 (aged 64) Mexico City, Mexico
- Children: Zelma Novelo

Sport
- Country: Mexico
- Sport: Archery
- Coached by: José Almanzor
Medal record
Women's archery
Representing Mexico
Pan American Games
Bronze medal – third place	1983 Caracas	Recurve 60 m
Bronze medal – third place	1983 Caracas	Recurve 70 m
Silver medal – second place	1987 Indianapolis	Team
Silver medal – second place	1991 Havana	Team
Bronze medal – third place	1991 Havana	Recurve
Bronze medal – third place	1991 Havana	Recurve 30 m
Bronze medal – third place	1991 Havana	Recurve 70 m
Central American and Caribbean Games
Gold medal – first place	1986 Santiago

Gonzala Aurora Bretón Gómez (10 January 1950 – 27 May 2014) was a Mexican archer who represented her country in four Olympic Games (1972, 1984, 1988 and 1992); won two silver and five bronze medals in Pan American Games and eight gold and two silver medals in Central American and Caribbean Games.

After retiring from international competitions, she worked as Olympic coach, briefly served as sports commentator for a television network during the 2012 Summer Olympics and, controversially, chaired the Mexican Archery Federation, where she was forced to resign after being charged with visa fraud by the United States government and accused of sexual harassment by the family of an underage female athlete.

== Athletic career ==
Aurora Bretón was born on 10 January 1950 in Mexico to Amado Enrique Bretón Gómez and Anselma Gómez Jiménez. She trained with fellow Olympian José Almanzor —grandfather of Luis Eduardo Vélez— and won nine national championships in her home country.

Internationally, she won two silver medals while competing in teams in three Pan American Games: first along María Fernández and Ofelia Ávila in Indianapolis 1987, and then in Havana 1991 along Alejandra García and Miriam Véliz. Individually, she won two bronze medals in Caracas 1983 (in recurve 60 and 70 meters) and three bronze medals in Havana 1991 (in recurve, recurve 30 and 70 meters).

Nevertheless, most of her medals were obtained in Central American and Caribbean Games. After winning five consecutive gold medals at the 1986 edition hosted in Santiago de los Caballeros, Dominican Republic, she was awarded the 1986 National Sports Prize of Mexico.

== Life after retirement ==
After retiring from international competitions, Bretón coached Olympic medalists Aída Román and Mariana Avitia and briefly worked as sports commentator for Televisa Deportes during the 2012 Summer Olympics. Controversially, she also served as president of the Mexican Archery Federation (in Spanish: Federación Mexicana de Tiro con Arco), where she was involved in two major scandals that forced her resignation.

In the first incident, the father of an underage female athlete accused her of molesting his daughter on 2 May 2004 during an international competition in France. According to the claimant, the travel expenses of the minor had been paid in advance by a state government, but Bretón booked a single room for both alleging budget cuts and, reportedly, asked an accompanying female athlete (with no prior knowledge of the local language nor acquainted with the city) to search for and bring back something to eat at the hotel while she sexually harassed his daughter.

A year later, in October 2005, Bretón was caught by immigration authorities of the United States while trying to secure travel visas for two deli vendors and a friend of her own daughter by presenting them as official coaches of the Mexican archery team. The United States Embassy in Mexico City intervened and she was charged with visa fraud and banned from visiting the country for ninety-nine years. Following the incident, she was asked to resign from all executive posts in both the federation and the Mexican Sports Confederation (Codeme).

Bretón died at the age of 64 from a chronic degenerative disease on 27 May 2014, at the ISSSTE General Hospital in Tacuba, a northeastern borough of Mexico City. Her remains, however, were moved by her family to the central state of Hidalgo.
