= Thierry Venant =

French archer (born 1960)

Personal information
- Nationality: French
- Born: 28 December 1960 (age 64); Linselles, France

Sport
- Sport: Archery

Thierry Venant (born 28 December 1960) is a French archer. He competed in the men's individual and team events at the 1988 Summer Olympics.
