= Jan Jacobsen (archer) =

Danish archer (born 1963)

Personal information
- Nationality: Danish
- Born: 5 March 1963 (age 63) Silkeborg, Denmark

Sport
- Sport: Archery

Achievements and titles
- Olympic finals: 1988 Summer Olympics

Jan Jacobsen (born 5 March 1963) is a Danish archer. He competed in the men's individual and team events at the 1988 Summer Olympics.
