= Richard Priestman =

British archer (born 1955)

Medal record

Men's archery

Representing Great Britain

Olympic Games
Bronze medal – third place	1988 Seoul	Team
Bronze medal – third place	1992 Barcelona	Team

Richard John Priestman (born 16 July 1955 in Liverpool, England) is a British archer who was a member of the British squad that won the team bronze medals at the 1988 and 1992 Summer Olympics His ex-wife Vladlena Priestman competed in archery for Great Britain at the 2000 Summer Olympics. He is now an Olympic coach for Team Israel.

== Olympics ==
=== As competitor ===
Priestman has competed in archery at three Olympic Games. His first appearance came in 1984 in Los Angeles where he shot a score of 2339 and finished in 48th position in the individual event.

At the Seoul Olympics in 1988 a new elimination format was introduced for the individual event. Priestman scored 1202, earning him 57th place in the preliminary round and did not advance to the later stages. For the first time in Olympic competition a team event was also held. Priestman was part of the British team that also included Steven Hallard and Leroy Watson. Ranked eighth after scores from the individual preliminary round were carried over Britain advanced to the semi-final where they improved four places to qualify for the final in fourth place. A final round team score of 968 meant Britain won the bronze medal behind hosts Korea and the United States. This was the first Olympic archery medal won for Britain since the 1908 Games where five medals, including two gold, were won by British archers.

In 1992 Priestman and Hallard were joined in the team event by teenager Simon Terry. The competition now took the form of a ranking round followed by a knock-out tournament. The British trio scored 3833 and lay 6th after the ranking round. Victories over Germany in the round of 16 and Australia in the quarter-final earned them a semi final against host nation Spain. Britain were defeated 236-234 but then defeated France in a playoff to win the bronze medal. In the individual event Priestman finished 41st in the ranking round and did not advance to the knock-out stages.

=== As coach ===
Priestman led Brazil as coach at the South American Games in Chile 2014. He led Colombia as coach at the Central American Games in Mexico 2014 and the Pan-American Games 2015 in Canada. Qualified 4 Colombian competitors for Rio2016

He was the Senior Olympic Coach for GBR at the Olympic Games RIO2016… 2 Competitors. And followed that up as Senior Olympic Coach for GBR at the Olympic Games Tokyo 2020 .. 6 competitors.

Priestman is the National Coach for Team Israel, which qualified two archers for the 2024 Paris Olympics. One of the archers is Mikaella Moshe, who qualified for the Olympics after training in archery for under two years under Priestman. The two archers train under Priestman in Israel for eight hours a day, six days a week, in temperatures during the summer months of between 35-45C (95F-113F).

== See also ==
- Great Britain at the 1984 Summer Olympics
- Great Britain at the 1988 Summer Olympics
- Great Britain at the 1992 Summer Olympics
