= Paul Bamber =

Zimbabwean archer (born 1961)

Personal information
- Nationality: Zimbabwean
- Born: 18 March 1961 (age 65)

Sport
- Sport: Archery

Paul Bamber (born 18 March 1961) is a Zimbabwean archer. He competed in the men's individual and team events at the 1988 Summer Olympics.
