= Sanjeev Singh (archer) =

Indian archer

Personal information
- Nationality: Indian
- Born: 18 November 1965 (age 60) Patna, Bihar, India

Sport
- Sport: Archery

Sanjeev Singh (born 18 November 1965) is an Indian archer. He competed in the men's individual and team events at the 1988 Summer Olympics.
