= Mats Nordlander =

Swedish archer (born 1963)

Personal information
- Nationality: Swedish
- Born: 25 November 1963 (age 62) Sundsvall, Sweden

Sport
- Sport: Archery

Mats Nordlander (born 25 November 1963) is a Swedish archer. He competed in the men's individual and team events at the 1988 Summer Olympics.
