= Rowel Merto =

Filipino archer

Personal information
- Nationality: Filipino
- Born: December 12, 1961 (age 64)
- Height: 5 ft 5 in (165 cm)
- Weight: 108 lb (49 kg)

Sport
- Sport: Archery

Rowel Merto (born December 12, 1961) is a Filipino archer. He competed in the men's individual event at the 1988 Summer Olympics.
