= Francis Notenboom =

Belgian archer (born 1957)

Personal information
- Nationality: Belgian
- Born: 9 August 1957 (age 69) Essen, Belgium

Sport
- Sport: Archery

Francis Notenboom (born 9 August 1957) is a Belgian archer. He competed in the men's individual and team events at the 1988 Summer Olympics.
