= Field archery at the 2001 World Games – Men's recurve =

Field archery men's recurve at the 2001 World Games
- Venue: Opas Skiing Spot, Akita, Japan
- Dates: 17–19 August 2001
- Competitors: 20 from 13 nations

Medalists
| gold medal | (United States) Jay Barrs |
| silver medal | (Italy) Michele Frangilli |
| bronze medal | (Italy) Fulvio Verdecchia |

The men's recurve archery competition at the 2001 World Games took place from 17 to 19 August 2001 at the Opas Skiing Spot in Akita, Japan.

== Competition format ==
A total of 20 archers entered the competition. The best four athletes from preliminary round qualifies to the semifinals.

== Results ==
=== Preliminary round ===
| Rank | Archer | Nation | Score | Note |
|---|---|---|---|---|
| 1 | Michele Frangilli | Italy | 682 | Q |
| 2 | Jay Barrs | United States | 667 | Q |
| 3 | Nicolas Gaudron | France | 661 | Q |
| 4 | Fulvio Verdecchia | Italy | 661 | Q |
| 5 | Gerard Koonings | Netherlands | 656 | |
| 6 | Ron van der Hoff | Netherlands | 653 | |
| 7 | Karl Blondeau | France | 651 | |
| 8 | Jonas Andersson | Sweden | 649 | |
| 9 | Mats Swordal | Norway | 643 | |
| 10 | Kazutaka Kinoshita | Japan | 642 | |
| 11 | Jonathan Shales | (United Kingdom) Great Britain | 641 | |
| 12 | Asamitsu Takemura | Japan | 640 | |
| 13 | Paul Kelly | (United Kingdom) Great Britain | 639 | |
| 14 | Michael Fisher | Australia | 638 | |
| 15 | Sigmund Lindberget | Norway | 619 | |
| 16 | Joseph McGlyn | United States | 611 | |
| 17 | Rudolf Grube | Austria | 604 | |
| 18 | Peter Ebden | New Zealand | 595 | |
| 19 | Patrick Choi Chong Ma | Hong Kong | 500 | |
| 20 | Bulathwela Fernando | Sri Lanka | 486 | |

=== Finals ===
Semifinals
1 | (Italy) Michele Frangilli | 52
4 | (Italy) Fulvio Verdecchia | 50
2 | (United States) Jay Barrs | 49
3 | (France) Nicolas Gaudron | 46

Finals
1 | (Italy) Michele Frangilli | 55
2 | (United States) Jay Barrs | 56
Third place
4 | (Italy) Fulvio Verdecchia | 53(5,5)
3 | (France) Nicolas Gaudron | 53(5,4)
