= Alan Bryant =

Zimbabwean archer (born 1955)

Personal information
- Nationality: Zimbabwean
- Born: 28 March 1955 (age 71)

Sport
- Sport: Archery

Alan Bryant (born 28 March 1955) is a Zimbabwean archer. He competed in the men's individual and team events at the 1988 Summer Olympics.
