= Archery at the 2003 Pan American Games =

This page shows the results of the archery competition at the 2003 Pan American Games, held from August 1 to August 17, 2003 in Santo Domingo, Dominican Republic.

== Men's competition ==
=== Recurve Individual ===
RANK	NAME
Gold medal	Vic Wunderle (USA)
Silver medal	Guy Krueger (USA)
Bronze medal	José Ricardo Merlos (ESA)

=== Recurve Team ===
RANK	NAME
Gold medal	United States; Guy Krueger; Glenn Meyers; Vic Wunderle
Silver medal	Mexico; Jorge Chapoy; Juanjo Serrano; Luiz Velez
Bronze medal	El Salvador; Cristobal Merlos; José Ricardo Merlos; Miguel Veliz
4.	Colombia; Santiago Echeverri; David Jiménez; José Pachón

== Women's competition ==
=== Recurve Individual ===
RANK	NAME
Gold medal	Jennifer Nichols (USA)
Silver medal	Claudia Landaverde (ESA)
Bronze medal	Stephanie Miller (USA)

=== Recurve Team ===
RANK	NAME
Gold medal	United States; Janet Dykman; Stephanie Miller; Jennifer Nichols
Silver medal	Mexico; Marisol Bretón; Zelma Novelo; Erika Reyes
Bronze medal	Venezuela; Leydi Brito; Vanessa Chacón; Rosanna Rosario
4.	Chile; Denisse van Lamoen; Liliana Burgos; Viviana Güenechea

== Medal table ==
Place	Nation	Gold medal	Silver medal	Bronze medal	Total
1	United States	4	1	1	6
2	Mexico	0	2	0	2
3	El Salvador	0	1	2	3
5	Venezuela	0	0	1	1
Total		4	4	4	12

== See also ==
- Archery at the 2004 Summer Olympics
