= Bernhard Schulkowski =

German archer (born 1951)

Personal information
- Nationality: German
- Born: 9 October 1951 (age 73); Hanstedt, West Germany

Sport
- Sport: Archery

Bernhard Schulkowski (born 9 October 1951) is a German archer. He competed in the men's individual and team events at the 1988 Summer Olympics.
