= Yen Man-sung =

Taiwanese archer

Personal information
- Nationality: Taiwanese
- Born: 27 November 1957 (age 67)

Sport
- Sport: Archery

Yen Man-sung (born 27 November 1957) is a Taiwanese archer. He competed in the men's individual and team events at the 1988 Summer Olympics.
