= El Salvador at the 2003 Pan American Games =

- IOC code: ESA
- NOC: El Salvador Olympic Committee

in Santo Domingo 1–17 August 2003
- Flag bearer: Cristina Maida
- Medals Ranked 19th: Gold 0 Silver 2 Bronze 2 Total 4

Pan American Games appearances (overview)
- 1951; 1955; 1959; 1963; 1967; 1971; 1975; 1979; 1983; 1987; 1991; 1995; 1999; 2003; 2007; 2011; 2015; 2019; 2023

The 14th Pan American Games were held in Santo Domingo, Dominican Republic from August 1 to August 17, 2003.

== Medals ==
=== Silver ===
===== Archery =====
- Women's Recurve Individual: Claudia Landaverde.

===== Weightlifting =====
- Women's – 69 kg: Eva Dimas.

=== Bronze ===
===== Archery =====
- Men's Recurve Individual: José Ricardo Merlos.
- Men's Recurve Team: Cristobal Merlos, José Ricardo Merlos and Miguel Veliz.

== Results by event ==
=== Athletics ===
Athlete	Event	Throws						Total	
Athlete	Event	1	2	3	4	5	6	Distance	Rank
Nancy Guillén	Women's Hammer	56.82	X	X	X	56.30	57.30	57.30 m	8

=== Boxing ===
Athlete	Event	Round of 16	Quarterfinals	Semifinals	Final
Athlete	Event	Opposition Result	Opposition Result	Opposition Result	Opposition Result
José Mario Jiménez	Flyweight	Torres (ECU); L 13-28	did not advance		

== See also ==
- El Salvador at the 2004 Summer Olympics
