= Carlos Reis =

Portuguese archer (born 1955)

Personal information
- Nationality: Portuguese
- Born: 14 June 1955 (age 69)

Sport
- Sport: Archery

Carlos Reis (born 14 June 1955) is a Portuguese archer. He competed in the men's individual event at the 1988 Summer Olympics.
