= Jorge Azevedo =

Brazilian archer (born 1950)

Personal information
- Born: 10 May 1950 (age 76) Rio de Janeiro, Brazil

Sport
- Sport: Archery

Jorge Azevedo (born 10 May 1950) is a Brazilian archer. He competed in the men's individual event at the 1988 Summer Olympics.
