= Ángel Bello =

Argentine archer (1951–2013)

Personal information
- Nationality: Argentine
- Born: 9 January 1951; Vigo, Spain
- Died: 13 June 2013 (aged 62)

Sport
- Sport: Archery

Ángel Bello (9 January 1951 – 13 June 2013) was an Argentine archer. He competed in the men's individual event at the 1988 Summer Olympics.
