= José Almanzor =

Mexican archer (1929–2017)

Personal information
- Born: 28 December 1929; Guadalajara, Mexico
- Died: 10 November 2017 (aged 87)

Sport
- Sport: Archery

José Almanzor (28 December 1929 – 10 November 2017) was a Mexican archer. He competed in the men's individual event at the 1972 Summer Olympics. Almanzor died on 10 November 2017, at the age of 87.
