= Miguel Pedraza =

Puerto Rican archer (born 1969)

Personal information
- Nationality: (Puerto Rico) Puerto Rican
- Born: 23 March 1969 (age 56)

Sport
- Sport: Archery

Miguel Pedraza (born 23 March 1969) is a Puerto Rican archer. He competed in the men's individual event at the 1988 Summer Olympics.
