= Ruth Rowe =

American archer (born 1947)

Personal information
- Born: March 11, 1947 (age 79) Pittsburgh, Pennsylvania, United States
- Education: University of Pittsburgh

Sport
- Sport: Archery
Medal record
Representing United States
World Championships
Gold medal – first place	1977 Canberra	Recurve team
Bronze medal – third place	1975 Interlaken	Recurve team
Bronze medal – third place	1983 Los Angeles	Recurve team
Pan American Games
Gold medal – first place	1983 Caracas	Individual recurve
Gold medal – first place	1983 Caracas	60m recurve
Gold medal – first place	1983 Caracas	70m recurve
Gold medal – first place	1983 Caracas	Recurve team
Gold medal – first place	1995 Mar del Plata	Recurve team
Silver medal – second place	1983 Caracas	30m recurve
Silver medal – second place	1995 Mar del Plata	Individual recurve
Silver medal – second place	1995 Mar del Plata	60m recurve

Ruth E. Rowe (born March 11, 1947, in Pittsburgh) is an American former archer and has also coached the sport.

== Archery ==
Rowe took up archery at the University of Pittsburgh where she earned a degree in biology.

Rowe won a bronze medal at the 1975 World Archery Championships, a gold medal at the 1977 World Archery Championships and another bronze at the 1983 World Archery Championships. All were in the women's team event.

At the 1983 Pan American Games she won gold medals in the women's individual recurve and women's recurve team events. In the 1995 edition she won another women's recurve team gold.

Rowe finished twelfth at the 1984 Summer Olympics in the women's individual event with 2477 points.

She later became coach of the US Virgin Islands archery team.
