= Joseph Malone (archer) =

Irish archer (born 1957)

Personal information
- Nationality: Irish
- Born: 15 February 1957 (age 68)

Sport
- Sport: Archery

Joseph Malone (born 15 February 1957) is an Irish archer. He competed in the men's individual event at the 1988 Summer Olympics.
