= Deborah Ochs =

American archer (born 1966)

Personal information
- Full name: Deborah Lynn Ochs
- Born: January 30, 1966 (age 60) Howell, Michigan, U.S.
Medal record
Women's archery
Representing United States
Olympic Games
Bronze medal – third place	1988 Seoul	Team
Pan American Games
Gold medal – first place	1983 Caracas	Team
Silver medal – second place	1983 Caracas	Individual

Deborah Lynn "Debra" Ochs (born January 30, 1966) is an American archer who was a member of the American squad that won the team bronze medals at the 1988 Summer Olympics. She also competed in the individual event, finishing in 26th place. Ochs was born in Howell, Michigan.
