= Claudio Pafundi =

Argentine archer (born 1962)

Personal information
- Nationality: Argentine
- Born: 31 January 1962 (age 63)

Sport
- Sport: Archery

Claudio Pafundi (born 31 January 1962) is an Argentine archer. He competed in the men's individual event at the 1988 Summer Olympics.
