= Janet Dykman =

American archer (born 1954)

Personal information
- Born: January 17, 1954 (age 72) Monterey Park, California, United States

Sport
- Sport: Archery
Medal record
Women's Archery
Representing the United States
Pan American Games
Gold medal – first place	1991 Havana	Individual (50 m)
Gold medal – first place	1995 Mar del Plata	Individual
Gold medal – first place	1995 Mar del Plata	Team
Gold medal – first place	1999 Winnipeg	Team
Gold medal – first place	2003 Santo Domingo	Team
Silver medal – second place	1995 Mar del Plata	Individual (30 m)
Silver medal – second place	1995 Mar del Plata	Individual (50 m)

Adrienne Cornelia "Janet" Dykman (born January 17, 1954) is an American archer.

Dykman was born in Monterey Park, California. She was a member of four Olympic archery teams and an alternate on one Olympic team. Her Olympic appearances included 1992, 1996, 2000, 2004 and 2008. In four Pan-American games she won a gold medal as a member of the women's team. In 1991, she broke the 50-meter record and received a gold medal. In 1995, she was the National Field Archery Champion and also won the National Archery Target Championship. Currently, she still competes on the California state indoor and outdoor circuits and in Traditional National Archery Tournaments.

Dykman represented the U.S. at the 2004 Summer Olympics. She placed 44th in the women's individual ranking round with a 72-arrow score of 619. In the first round of elimination, she faced 21st-ranked and eventual bronze medalist Alison Williamson of Great Britain. Dykman lost 147–121 in the 18-arrow match, placing 60th overall in women's individual archery.

Dykman was also a member of the 13th-place American women's archery team. Besides the 2004 Summer Olympics in Greece, she also competed at the 1996 Summer Olympics in Atlanta, the 2000 Summer Olympics in Sydney, and the 2008 Summer Olympics in Beijing.
