= Lee Han-sup =

South Korean archer (born 1966)

Medal record

Men's archery

Representing South Korea

Olympic Games
Gold medal – first place	1988 Seoul	Team

Lee Han-Sup (born April 30, 1966) is a South Korean archer and Olympic champion. He competed at the 1988 Summer Olympics in Seoul, where he won a gold medal with the South Korean archery team.
