= Omar Bustani =

Mexican archer (born 1966)

Personal information
- Nationality: Mexican
- Born: 19 June 1966 (age 58)

Sport
- Sport: Archery

Omar Bustani (born 19 June 1966) is a Mexican archer. He competed at the 1988 Summer Olympics and the 1992 Summer Olympics.
