= Jeannot Robitaille =

Canadian archer (born 1953)

Personal information
- Born: 19 April 1953 (age 73) Dupuy, Quebec, Canada

Sport
- Sport: Archery
Medal record
Representing Canada
Pan American Games
| Silver medal – second place | 1995 Mar del Plata | 90m recurve |
| Bronze medal – third place | 1995 Mar del Plata | Recurve team |

Jeannot Robitaille (born 19 April 1953) is a Canadian archer. He competed at the 1992 Summer Olympics and the 1996 Summer Olympics.
