= Park Sung-soo =

South Korean archer (1970–2025)

- Hangul: 박성수
- RR: Bak Seongsu
- MR: Pak Sŏngsu

Park Sung-soo
Medal record

Representing South Korea

Men's archery

Olympic Games
Gold medal – first place	1988 Seoul	Team
Silver medal – second place	1988 Seoul	Individual

Park Sung-soo (May 19, 1970 – August 27, 2025) was a South Korean archer and Olympic champion. He competed at the 1988 Summer Olympics in Seoul, where he won a gold medal with the South Korean archery team, and also an individual silver medal. Park has been a coach since 2000, including coaching Oh Jin Hyek as well as serving as head coach for the Korean national team at the 2024 Paris Olympics.

Park was found dead on August 27, 2025, at the age of 55.
