= Hwarang Archery Field =

South Korean archery field

Coordinates: 37°37′18″N 127°05′57″E

The Hwarang Archery Field is an archery field constructed between November 1985 and January 1986, and then renovated between May and August 1988. It hosted the archery competitions for the 1988 Summer Olympics in Seoul.
