= Vedat Erbay =

Turkish archer (born 1967)

Personal information
- Nationality: Turkish
- Born: 16 June 1967 (age 58)

Sport
- Sport: Archery

Vedat Erbay (born 16 June 1967) is a Turkish archer. He competed at the 1988 Summer Olympics and the 1992 Summer Olympics.
