= Daniel Desnoyers (archer) =

Canadian archer (born 1957)

Personal information
- Born: 27 February 1957 (age 69) Quebec City, Quebec, Canada

Sport
- Sport: Archery

Daniel Desnoyers (born 27 February 1957) is a Canadian archer. He competed in the men's individual and team events at the 1988 Summer Olympics.
