= Christopher Blake (archer) =

Australian archer (born 1953)

Personal information
- Nationality: Australian
- Born: 13 June 1953 (age 72)

Sport
- Sport: Archery

Christopher John Blake (born 13 June 1953) is an Australian archer. He competed at the 1984 Summer Olympics and the 1988 Summer Olympics.
