= John McDonald (archer) =

Canadian archer (born 1965)

Personal information
- Born: 28 May 1965 (age 61) Halifax, Nova Scotia, Canada

Sport
- Sport: Archery

John McDonald (born 28 May 1965) is a Canadian archer. He competed in the men's individual and team events at the 1988 Summer Olympics.
