= Trena King =

American archer (born 1958)

Personal information
- National team: United States
- Born: Katrina Jane De Steven; January 17, 1958 (age 67) Kingwood, West Virginia, U.S.

Sport
- Sport: Archery

Katrina Jane "Trena" King (née De Steven) (born January 17, 1958, in Kingwood, West Virginia) is an American archer.

== Archery ==
She finished seventh at the 1984 Summer Olympic Games in the women's individual event with 2508 points.

King won a silver medal at the 1987 Pan American Games in the women's individual event.
