= Kerem Ersü =

Turkish archer (born 1967)

Personal information
- Nationality: Turkish
- Born: 25 April 1967 (age 58)

Sport
- Sport: Archery

Kerem Ersü (born 25 April 1967) is a Turkish archer. He competed at the 1988 Summer Olympics and the 1992 Summer Olympics. Ersü was the flag bearer for Turkey in the opening ceremony of the 1992 Summer Olympics.
