= Detlef Kahlert =

German archer (born 1962)

Personal information
- Nationality: German
- Born: 1 August 1962 (age 62); Schwerte, West Germany

Sport
- Sport: Archery

Detlef Kahlert (born 1 August 1962) is a German former archer. He competed at the 1984 Summer Olympics and the 1988 Summer Olympics.
