= Ricardo Merlos =

Salvadoran archer (born 1983)

Personal information
- Born: 25 September 1983 (age 42) San Salvador, El Salvador

Sport
- Sport: Archery
Medal record
Representing El Salvador
Pan American Games
Bronze medal – third place	2003 Santo Domingo	Recurve individual
Bronze medal – third place	2003 Santo Domingo	Recurve team

José Ricardo Merlos Orellana (born September 25, 1983) is a Salvadoran archer. Merlos competed at the 2004 Summer Olympics in men's individual archery. He was defeated in the first round of elimination, placing 35th overall.

His older brother Cristóbal Merlos competed in archery for El Salvador at the 2000 Summer Olympics in Sydney, Australia. He also won a bronze medal at the 2003 Pan American Games as a part of the recurve team.
