= Patrick De Koning =

Belgian archer (born 1961)

Personal information
- Nationality: Belgian
- Born: 23 April 1961 (age 64) Dendermonde, Belgium

Sport
- Sport: Archery

Patrick De Koning (born 23 April 1961) is a Belgian archer. He competed at the 1984 Summer Olympics and the 1988 Summer Olympics.
