= Linda Kazienko =

Canadian archer (born 1955)

Personal information
- Born: 29 May 1955 (age 71) Grimsby, Ontario, Canada
- Height: 175 cm (5 ft 9 in)

Sport
- Country: Canada
- Sport: Archery

Linda Kazienko (born 29 May 1955 in Grimsby) is a former Canadian archer.

== University ==
Kazienko attended the University of Guelph from 1974 to 1978 and graduated with a MSc in animal and poultry science. She was a member of the university archery team. Later she entered the DVM program.

== Archery ==
Kazienko won a silver medal in the women's team recurve at the 1979 Pan American Games. In 1983 she won bronze medals in the women's individual recurve, women's individual recurve 30m, women's individual recurve 50m and a silver in the women's team recurve events.

She also competed at the 1984 Summer Olympic Games, five World Archery Championships and the 1982 Commonwealth Games
