= Shyam Lal Meena =

Indian archer (1965–2026)

Shyam Lal Meena (4 March 1965 – 24 May 2026) was an Indian archer. He represented India at the 1988 Summer Olympics. The Government of India honoured him with an Arjuna award in 1989. First international gold medal for Rajasthan.

Meena died on 24 May 2026, at the age of 61.
