= Ole Gammelgaard Nielsen =

Danish archer (born 1965)

Personal information
- Nationality: Danish
- Born: 20 November 1965 (age 59); Silkeborg, Denmark

Sport
- Sport: Archery

Ole Gammelgaard Nielsen (born 20 November 1965) is a Danish archer. He competed at the 1988 Summer Olympics and the 1992 Summer Olympics.
