= Eagle Creek Park =

Public park and reservoir in Indiana, US

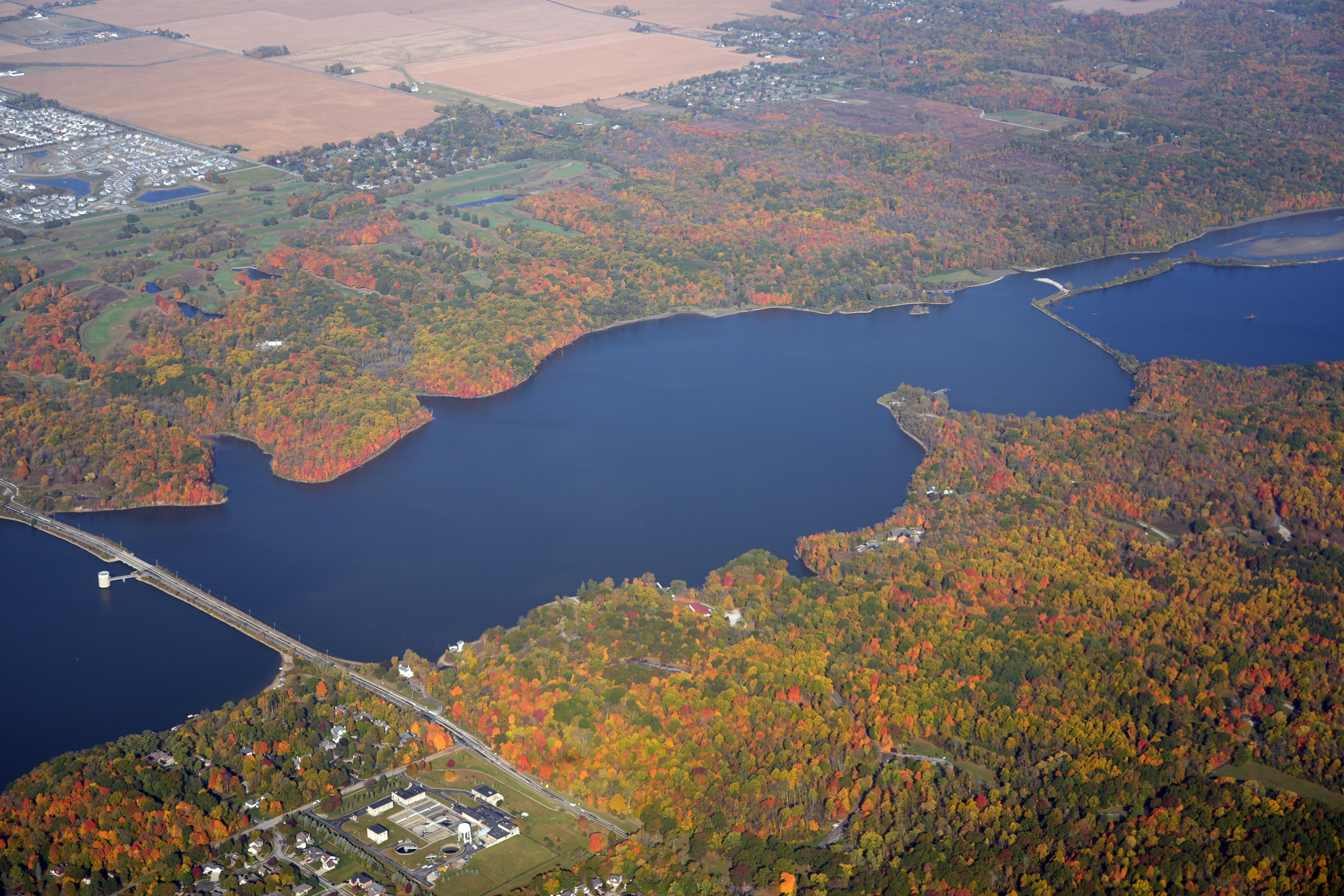
- The park and reservoir from the southeast in 2022
- Interactive map of Eagle Creek Park
- Type: City park
- Location: 7840 W. 56th Street; Indianapolis, Indiana, United States
- Coordinates: 39°51′18″N 86°17′51″W
- Area: 5,300 acres (21 km^{2})
- Opened: June 10, 1972; 54 years ago
- Operator: Indy Parks and Recreation
- Visitors: 1.3 million (in 2025)
- Open: All year, dawn to dusk
- Website: Official website

Eagle Creek Park is a municipal park in the northwest of Indianapolis, Indiana, United States. Officially opened in 1972, it covers approximately 3,900 acres (16 km^{2}) of land and 1,400 acres (5.7 km^{2}) of water. The largest park in Indianapolis and one of the largest municipal parks in the United States, it contains about 30 miles (48 km) of trails. The majority of the park sits on land amassed by Josiah K. Lilly Jr. from the 1930s to 1950s. Lilly built a country estate and reforested the land before donating it to Purdue University in 1958; the university sold the land to the city of Indianapolis in 1966. It is operated by Indy Parks & Recreation with support from the Eagle Creek Park Foundation.

The park is centered around Eagle Creek Reservoir, which was formed from the construction of the Eagle Creek Dam. Most of the park's attractions are on the east side of the reservoir, including the Ornithology Center, which acts as the park's main visitor center. Eagle Creek Park serves primarily as a nature reserve. It is among the most visited attractions in Indianapolis, with 1.3 million guests in 2025. Most of the reservoir is open for water sports and recreation. The park is a popular place for birding, and is considered an Important Bird Area by the National Audubon Society.

== History ==
In 1934, Josiah K. Lilly Jr. purchased 12 acres (4.9 ha) of land around what is now the Ornithology Center and called it Eagle Crest Estate. By the 1950s, Lilly owned nearly 3,000 acres (12 km^{2}) in the area. He created Eagle Valley Farms on the west side of the creek; on the east side, he constructed Lilly Lake and reforested former farm land into the Eagle Crest Forest Reserve. In 1958, Lilly donated his land to Purdue University.

In 1957, flooding along Eagle Creek in Speedway, Indiana, resulted in six deaths. In the following years, the city government proposed to dam the creek to prevent further flooding. In the early 1960s, the city of Indianapolis began negotiating with Purdue to purchase the land required for this new dam and reservoir. The purchase was completed in February 1966, with a purchase price of $3.2 million (equivalent to $31.8 million in 2025). That year, the northeastmost 300 acres (1.2 km^{2}) of the park were opened to the public. Ground was broken for the dam on February 1, 1966. The dam was completed in 1968, just north of Interstate 74, and the resulting reservoir was filled by 1970. Mayor Richard Lugar officially opened Eagle Creek Park on June 10, 1972. The park's Nature Center opened in what had previously been Lilly's library building.

In 1979, the Eagle Creek Park Foundation was established by the Eagle Creek Park Advisory Committee as a nonprofit 501(c)(3) organization. The foundation promotes volunteerism and provides funding for the park and its programs.

In 1967, the Indianapolis Flood Control Board sold the rights to mine gravel from the park to a private company. Mining operations began in 1968 and did not fully cease in the park until 1980, after a protracted legal dispute between the gravel company and the city. The cofferdam and flooded gravel pit became the Waterfowl Sanctuary. Indianapolis hosted the 1987 Pan American Games, during which the park served as the venue for the archery, canoeing, modern pentathlon, and rowing competitions. In preparation, the reservoir was dredged along the rowing course to ensure the depth was at least three meters (9.8 ft) throughout. The sediment was transferred to the waterfowl sanctuary to improve the habitat. The park has since hosted a number of rowing events, including the NCAA Rowing Championships (2002, 2003, 2013, 2014, and 2019) and the World Rowing Championships (1994).

The Museum of Indian Heritage was opened in the park in 1967 by James H. Lawton. The museum was closed in 1989 when its collection was merged with the newly formed Eiteljorg Museum of American Indians and Western Art. In 1997, the museum building was repurposed as the Peace Learning Center. The Earth Discovery Center was opened in 2007. The Nature Center was renovated and reopened as the Ornithology Center in 2009.

== Reservoir and dam ==
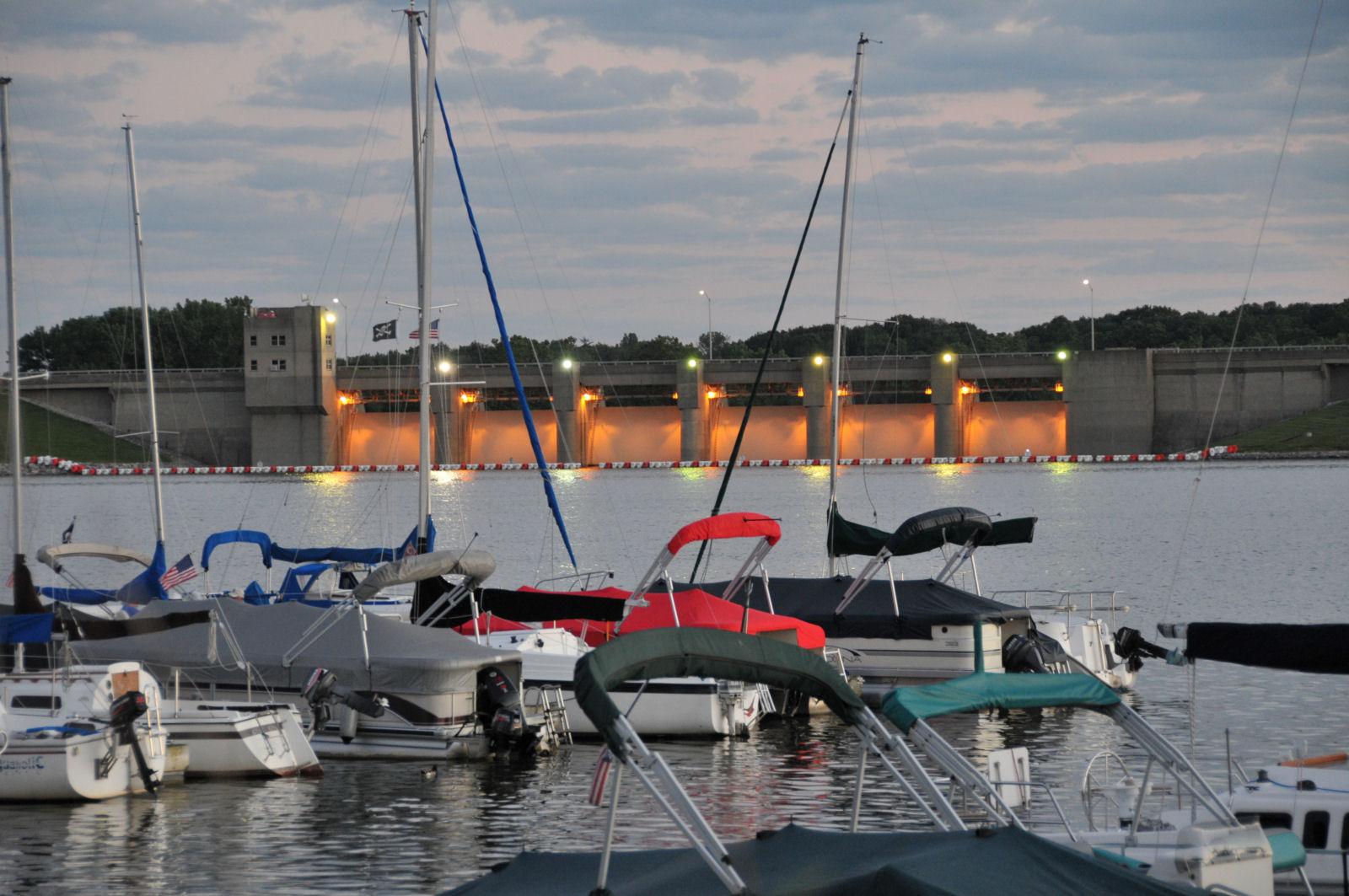
Eagle Creek Dam, as seen from the north

Eagle Creek Reservoir is fed by the main stem of Eagle Creek itself along with Fishback Creek and School Branch. It is approximately 4.3 miles (7 km) long, with an average depth of 18 feet (5.5 m) and a maximum depth of 45 feet (14 m). It has a reported capacity of 5.5–7.8 billion US gallons (21–30 billion litres). At 75 feet (23 m) tall and 5,100 feet (1,600 m) long, Eagle Creek Dam is one of the largest dams in Indiana. It is an earthen and concrete dam with six tainter gates, each 40 by 31 feet (12.2 by 9.4 m). The Indiana Department of Natural Resources considers it a "High Hazard" dam whose failure would cause serious damage and loss of life. The dam was listed as "conditionally poor" in 2006, but was rated as "fair" by 2024.

Approximately 10 million US gallons (38×10^{6} L) per day are taken from the reservoir to supply the Indianapolis water system. In 2025, a plan was introduced by Lebanon Utilities to send an additional 1 million US gallons (3.8×10^{6} L) a day from the reservoir to the LEAP Innovation District in Boone County, as part of a proposed 25 million US gallons (95×10^{6} L) a day to be taken from various water sources in Marion County. The plan originally called for 15–20 million US gallons (57×10^{6}–76×10^{6} L) of resulting treated wastewater from Boone County to be reintroduced directly into the north end of Eagle Creek Reservoir. The plan received significant push back from environmentalists and locals, with opponents pointing to research that shows that treated wastewater can alter ecosystems. In May 2026, Lebanon Utilities stated it would not be constructing a discharge site inside the limits of the park. However, other upstream sites remain under consideration.

== Park overview ==
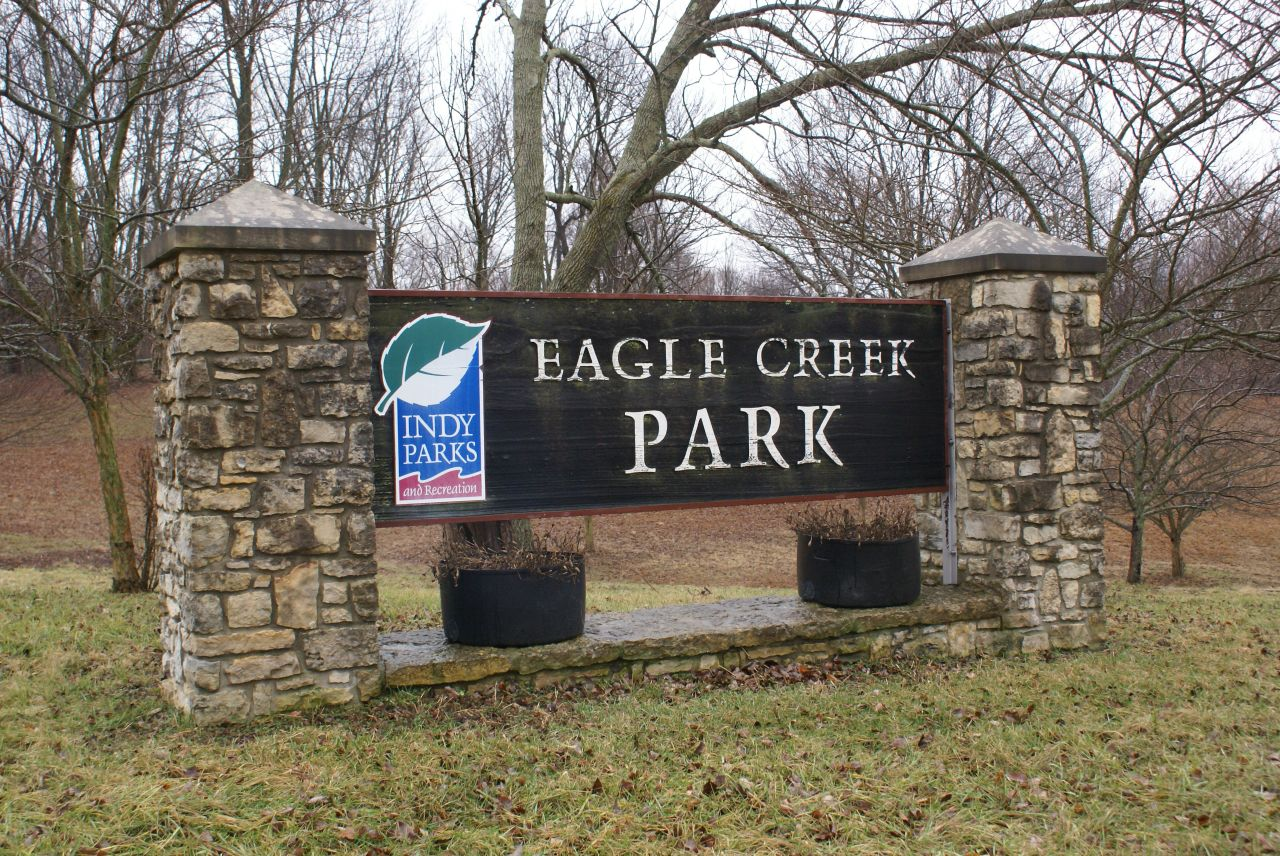
One of the park's entry signs

The park covers 3,900 acres (16 km^{2}) of land and 1,400 acres (5.7 km^{2}) of water, making it one of the largest municipal parks in the United States. The park is bounded by Interstate 65 to the north and east and the Marion County line to the west. Eagle Creek Reservoir is bisected by the 56th Street Causeway. Most of the park's attractions lie north of the causeway. There are two gatehouses, both on the park's east side: the 71st Street Entrance and the 56th Street Entrance. There are three automatic gates on the west side of the park. The park is adjacent to Eagle Creek Airpark, which is controlled by the Indianapolis Airport Authority.

The majority of the park's 30 miles (48 km) of trails are on the eastern half of the reservoir, which is the most visited side. There are trails on the west side as well. The West Side Hiking Trail project was included in the 1997 Eagle Creek Park strategic plan. A $2.6 million Lilly Endowment grant in 2018 allowed construction of the trails to begin in 2019. The trails were fully completed in 2024.

The National Audubon Society describes the park as containing deciduous forest, coniferous woodlots, early successional areas, scrub-shrub, restored prairie, riparian woods, and emergent wetlands, with second growth deciduous woodlands the most prevalent habitat.

=== Waterfowl Sanctuary ===
In the northeast section of Eagle Creek Reservoir is the Waterfowl Sanctuary. A former gravel pit, the 125-acre (0.51 km^{2}) area is separated by a cofferdam from the rest of the reservoir. It is a popular area for birding. The entire park is deemed an Important Bird Area by the National Audubon Society.

=== Scott Starling Nature Sanctuary ===
The Scott Starling Nature Sanctuary is an approximately 60-acre (0.24 km^{2}) section of the park located at the northern end of the west side. It is the site of several ecological restoration projects. It was dedicated to Scott Starling in 1991 by his father Alfred "Bud" Starling, after Scott was killed by lightning in 1988 at age 29. Bud Starling was a volunteer who provided weekly bird walks around the park and wrote a birding column in The Indianapolis Star for 30 years.

=== Nature preserves ===
Eagle Creek Park contains two state-designated nature preserves. The 240-acre (0.97 km^{2}) Eagle's Crest Nature Preserve covers much of the park's west side, containing old second-growth mesic upland forest. The 43-acre (0.17 km^{2}) Spring Pond Nature Preserve is on the east side below 62nd Street, containing a wet-mesic forest.

== Attractions and facilities ==
=== Ornithology Center ===
The Ornithology Center

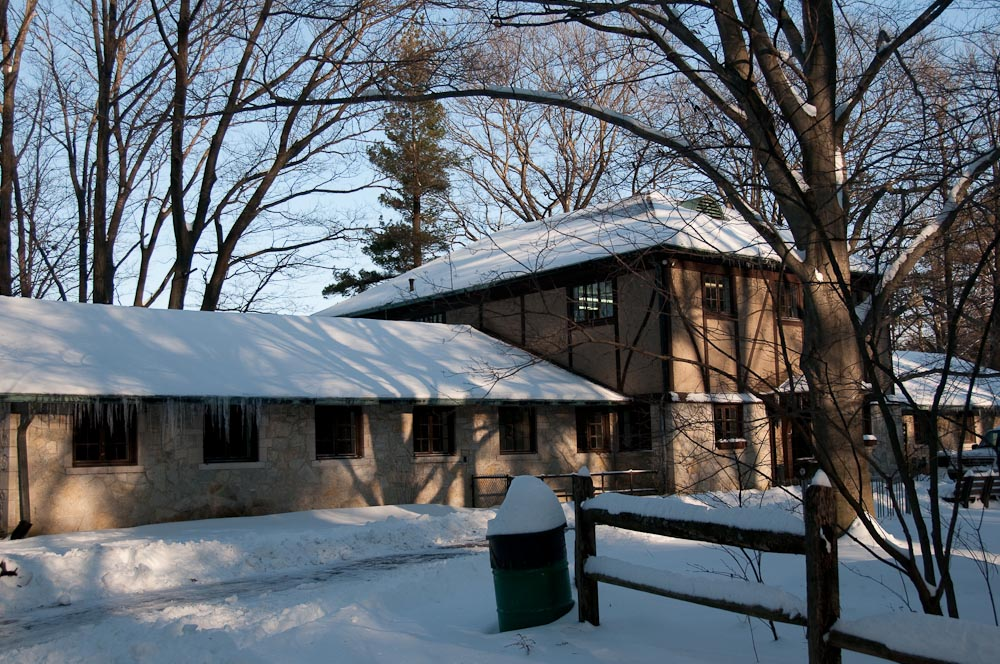
The south end of the center in January 2009

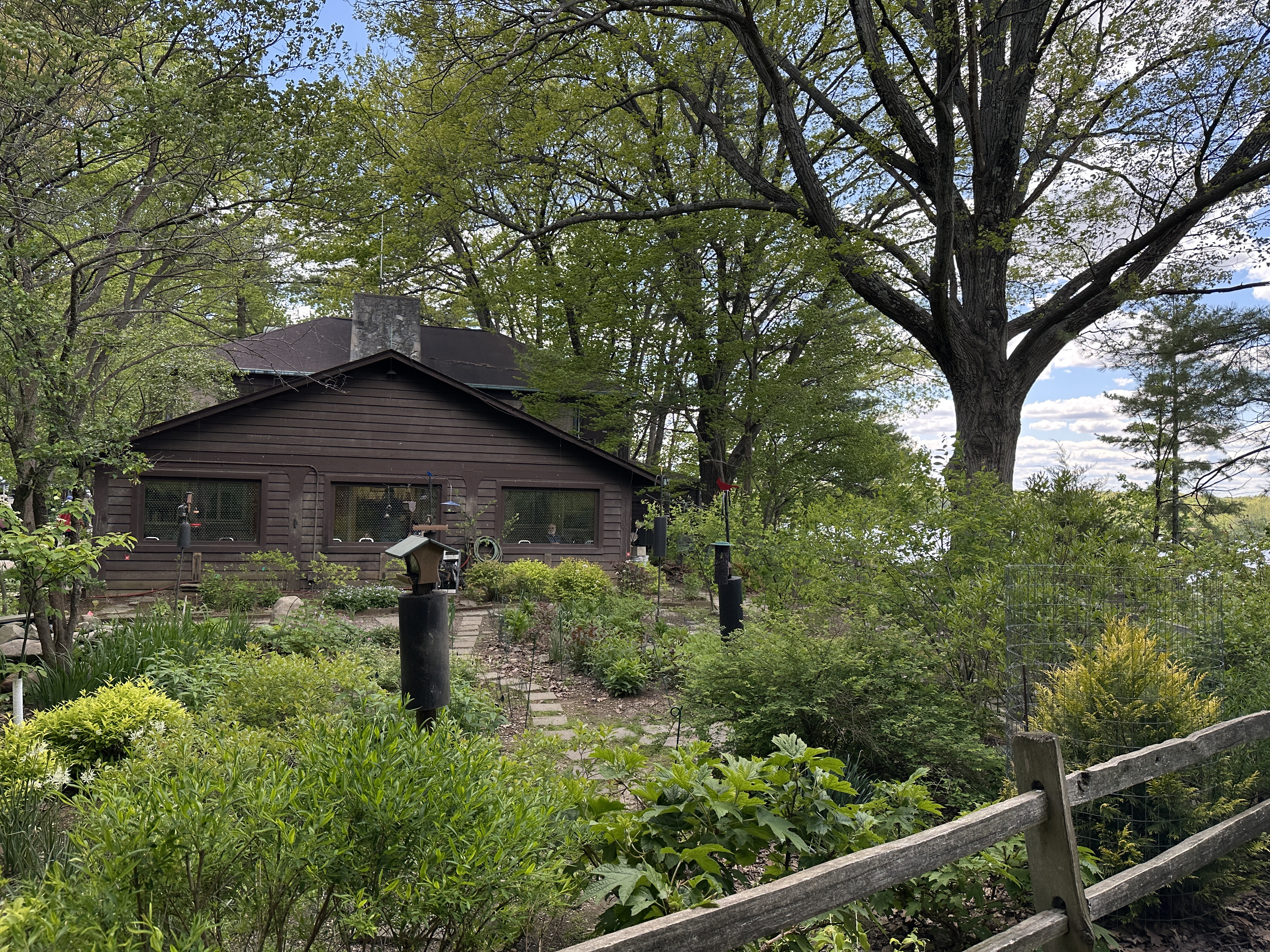
The birdfeeder area on the north side in May 2026

Overlooking the Waterfowl Sanctuary, the Ornithology Center at Eagle Creek Park hosts a small museum and serves as one of the visitor centers. The observation center includes indoor and outdoor viewing platforms. On the northside, observers can look out into the center's birdfeeding area. Several non-releasable birds are also housed at the adjacent Carlsen Aviary. The Amos Butler Audubon Society offers a weekly birding walk on Sundays, beginning at the center.

=== Earth Discovery Center ===
Intended for children, the Earth Discovery Center contains exhibits and information about native Indiana plants and animals, as well as live native reptiles, fish, amphibians, taxidermy mounts, and replicas. It was first opened in 2007.

=== Bear Overlook ===
Galyan's Bear is a 36-foot-tall (11 m) steel sculpture of a bear that marks the south entrance to the park's west side. Galyan's was a sporting goods store founded in Plainfield, Indiana. The sculpture was moved from White River State Park to its current location at Bear Overlook in April 2002.

=== Lilly Lake ===
Lilly Lake is a five-acre (2.0 ha) lake in the park, primarily used for bank fishing. It also has a picnic shelter. The lake was previously open to pedal boats.

=== Additional ===
- Boat ramp and slips
- Cross-country skiing paths
- Eagle Creek Beach
- Fitness course
- Fishing areas
- Gordon Gilmer Bark Park
- Go Ape Treetop Adventure
- Golf course (36 hole)
- Indianapolis Rowing Center
- Indoor facility rentals
- Kayak, paddleboard, and canoe rentals
- Mary and John Geisse Soccer Complex
- Peace Learning Center
- Picnic areas and shelters
- Sailboat marina

== Administration and operation ==
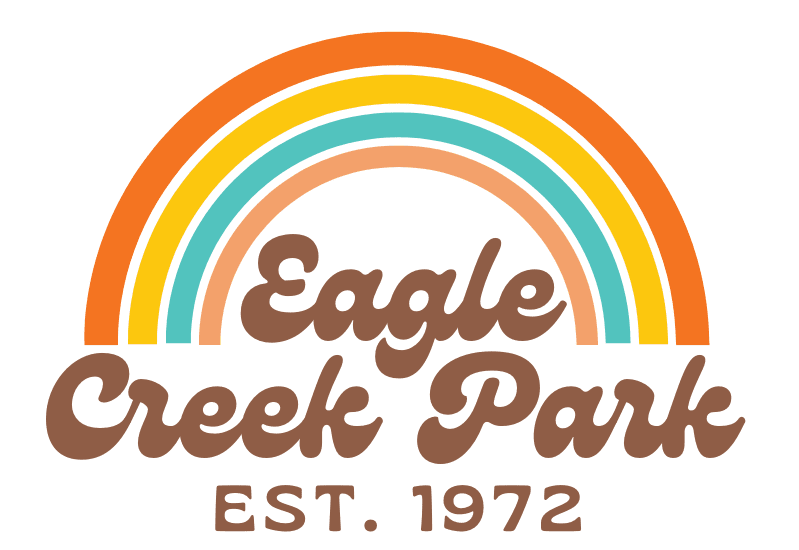
Logo for the park used since 2022

The park is operated by Indy Parks and Recreation in partnership with the Eagle Creek Park Foundation. The foundation and the park's management share a main office in the park. The current executive director of the foundation is Meghan Mustin and Brittany Davis is the Indy Parks Regional Park Manager.

It is the only park in the Indy Parks system with an entrance fee, with a reduced cost for Marion County residents. It is open from dawn to dusk.

== Gallery ==
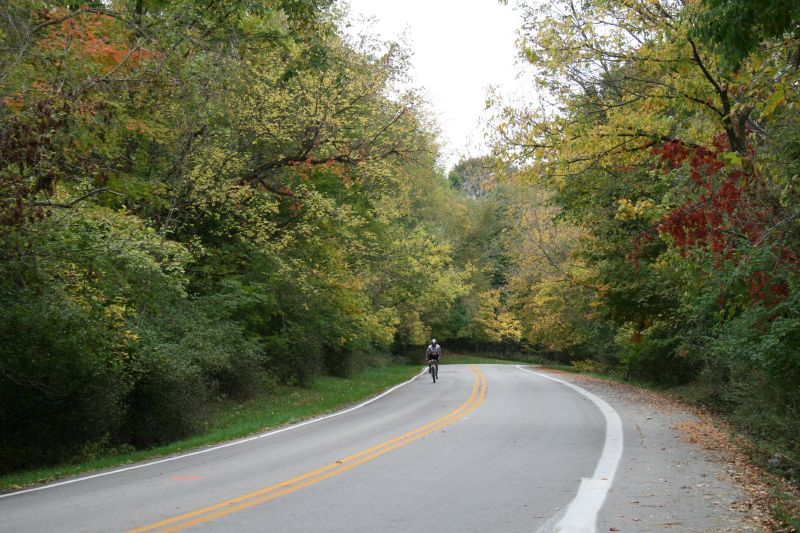
A road through the park in the fall

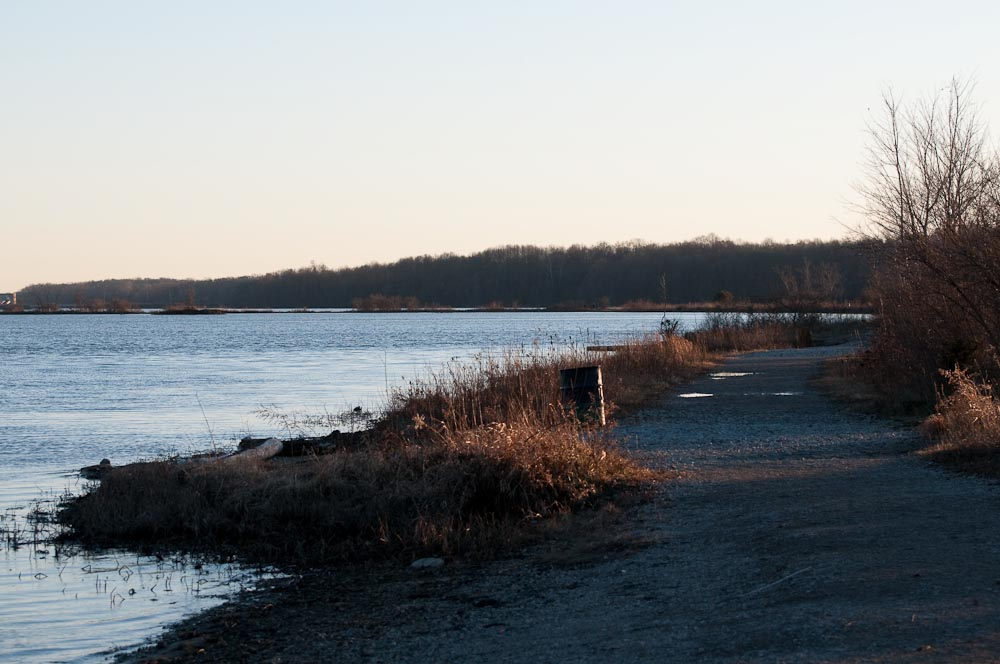
The cofferdam trail around the Waterfowl Sanctuary

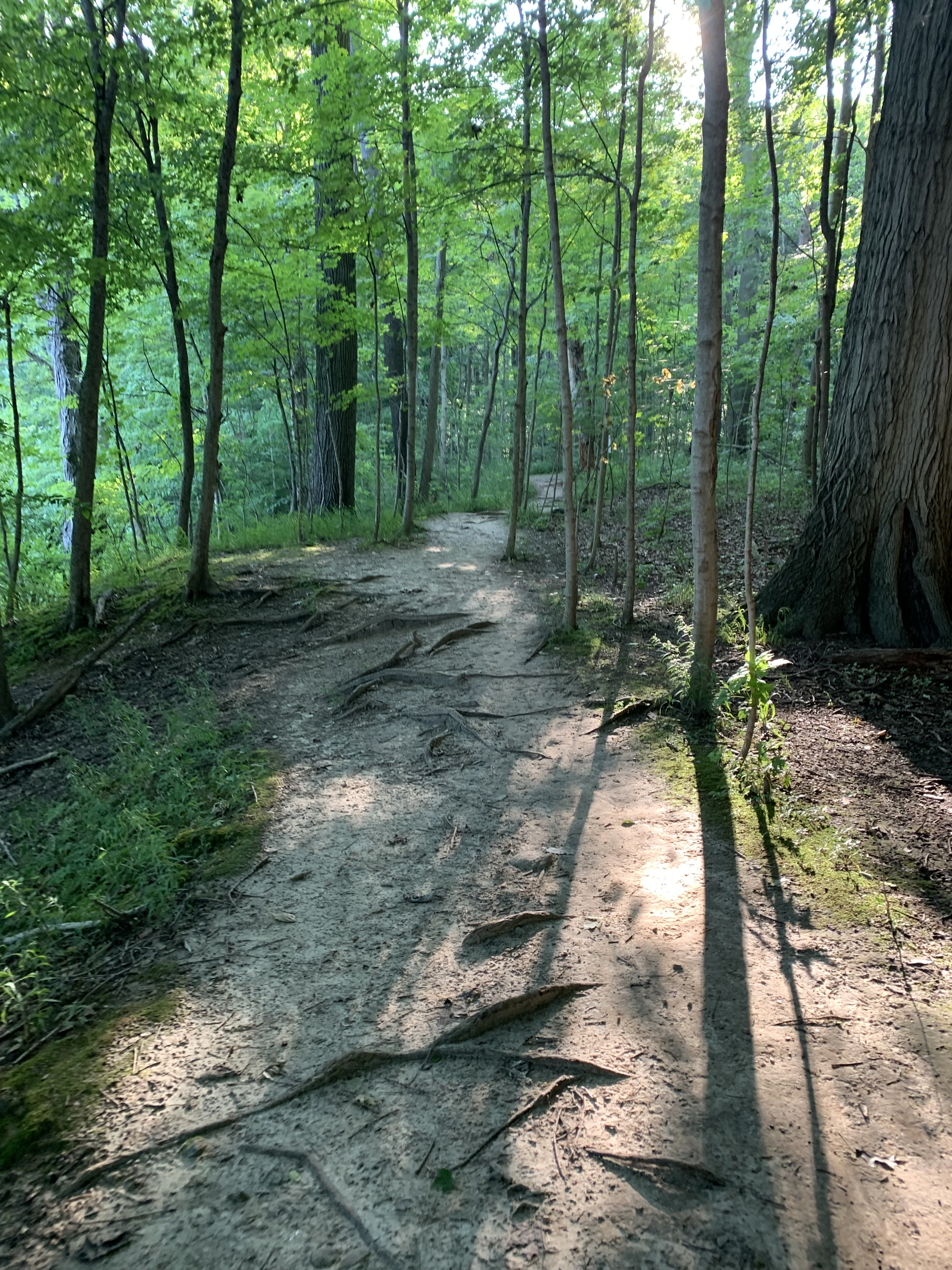
A typical trail in the park

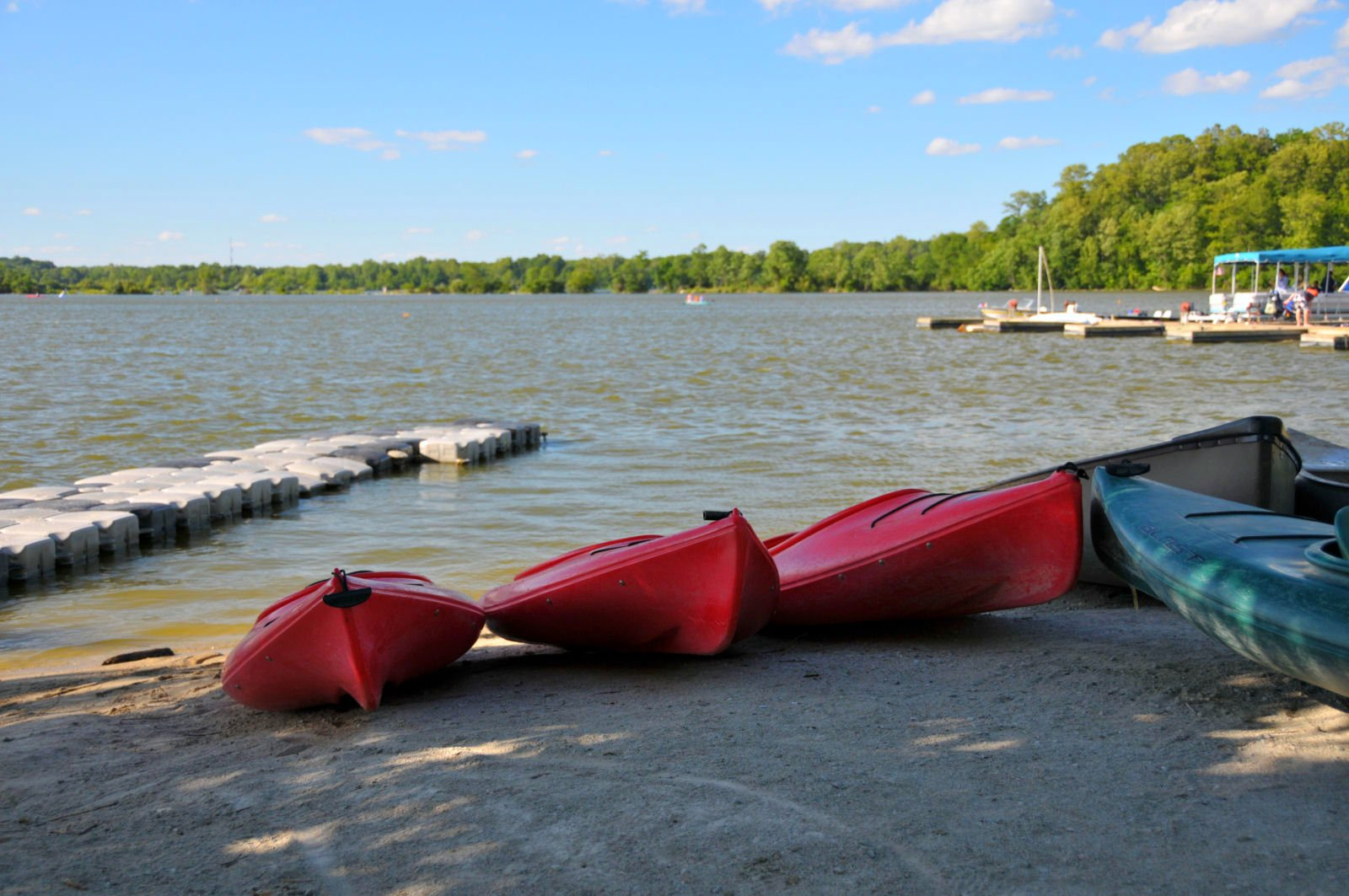
Rentable kayaks beside the reservoir

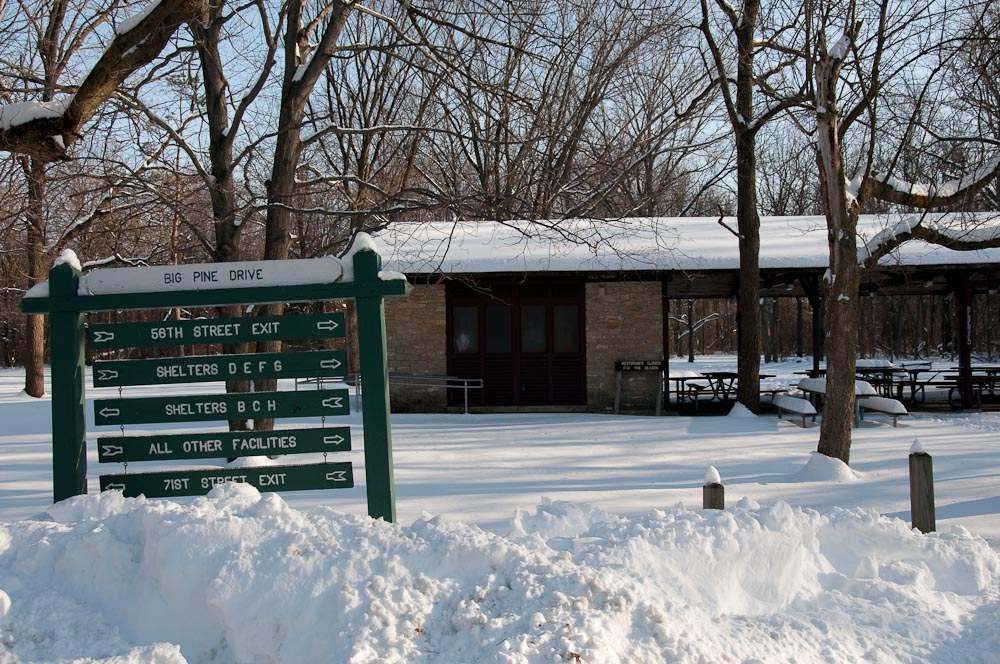
A picnic shelter and directional sign during the winter

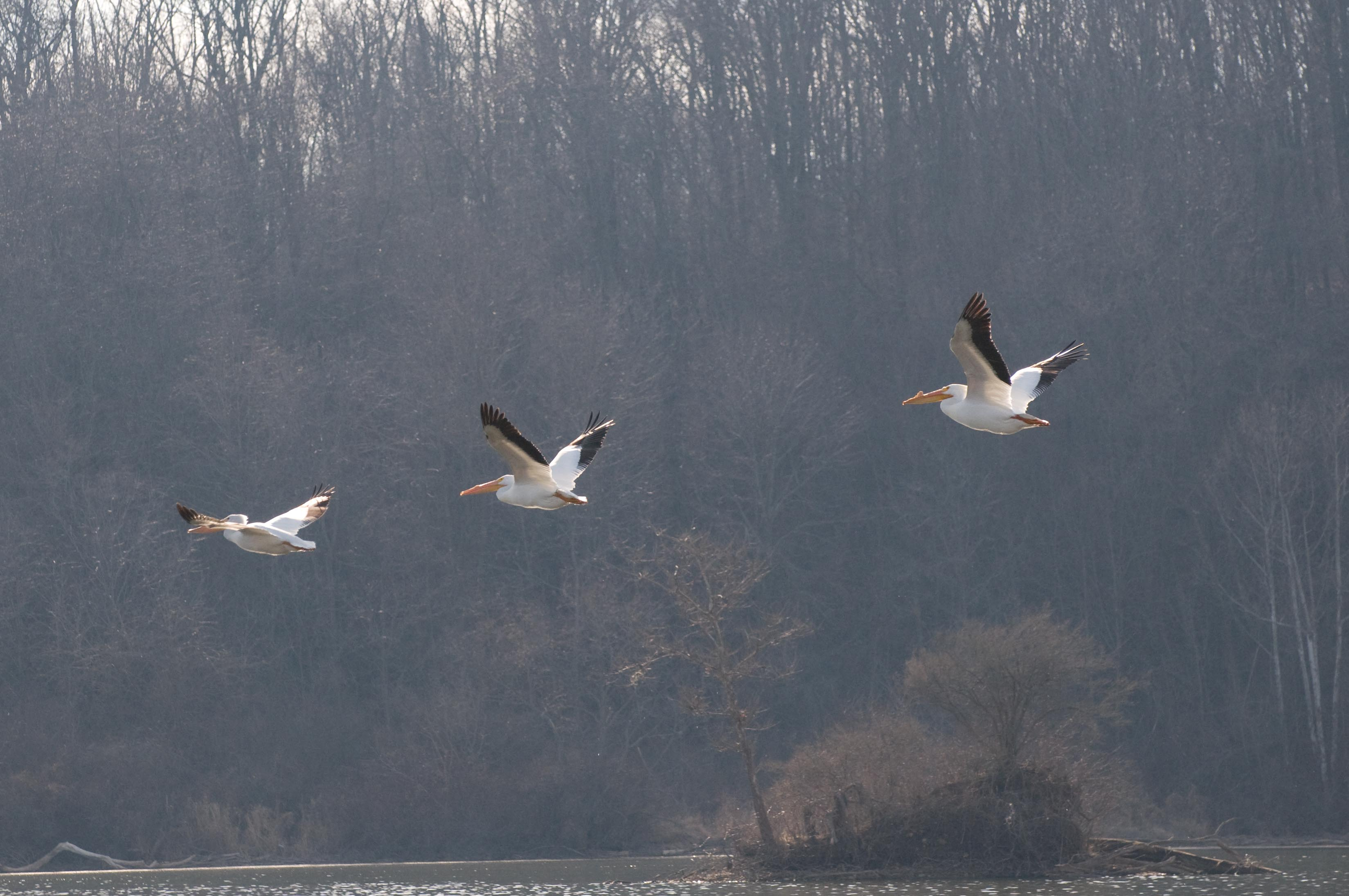
American white pelicans flying at the park's bird sanctuary

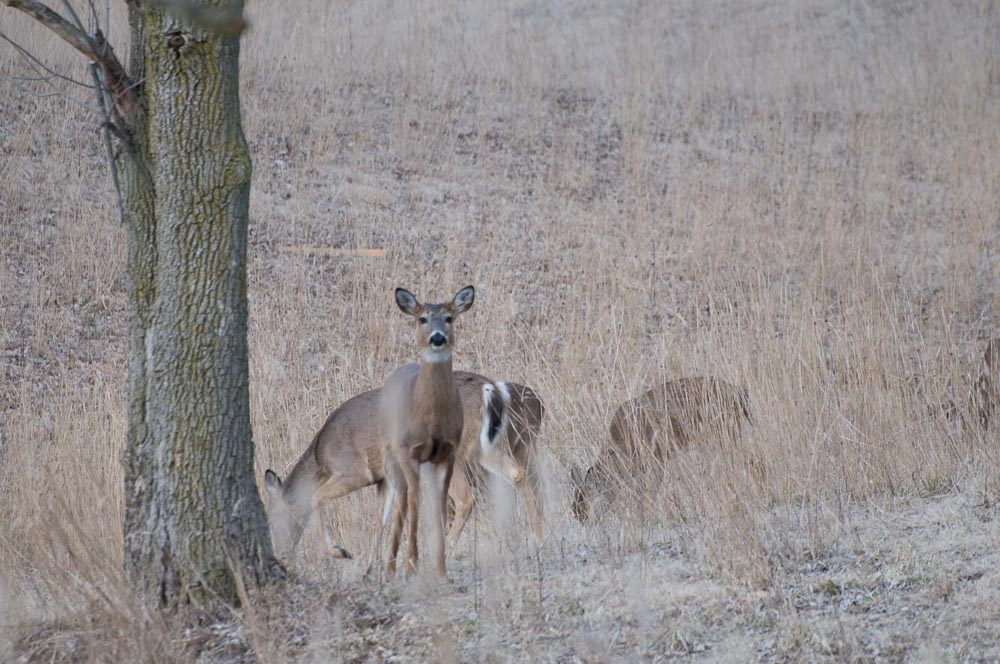
Deer grazing in the park

== See also ==
- List of urban parks by size
- List of parks in Indianapolis
- List of attractions and events in Indianapolis
- List of nature centers in Indiana
