= Archery at the 1987 Pan American Games =

- Venue: Eagle Creek Park
- Dates: August, 1987

Archery at the 1987 Pan American Games was held in August 1987. The events took place at a temporary site at Eagle Creek Park in Indianapolis, United States. Just like in the Olympics, the archery competition will be held using the recurve bow.

== Medal summary ==
=== Medal table ===
* Host nation (United States)

Rank	Nation	Gold	Silver	Bronze	Total
1	United States*	4	1	1	6
2	Mexico	0	2	0	2
3	Canada	0	1	1	2
4	Cuba	0	0	2	2
Totals (4 entries)		4	4	4	12

=== Events ===
Event	Gold	Silver	Bronze
Men's individual	Jay Barrs; United States	Denis Canuel; Canada	Darrell Pace; United States
Women's individual	Denise Parker; United States	Trena King; United States	Eva Bueno; Cuba
Men's team	United States	Mexico	Canada
Women's team	United States	Mexico	Cuba

== See also ==
- Archery at the 1988 Summer Olympics
