= Denise Parker =

American archer (born 1973)

Personal information
- Born: December 12, 1973 (age 52) Salt Lake City, Utah, U.S.
- Height: 5 ft 5 in (165 cm)
- Weight: 130 lb (59 kg)
Medal record
Women's archery
Representing United States
Olympic Games
Bronze medal – third place	1988 Seoul	Team
Pan American Games
Gold medal – first place	1987 Indianapolis	Individual
Gold medal – first place	1987 Indianapolis	Team
Gold medal – first place	1991 Havana	Individual
Gold medal – first place	1991 Havana	Team
Gold medal – first place	1999 Winnipeg	Team

Denise Parker (born December 12, 1973) is an American archer who was a member of the American squad that won the team bronze medals at the 1988 Summer Olympics, becoming the youngest Olympic archery medalist at age fifteen. She also competed in the individual event, finishing in 21st place. Parker then competed in both the individual and team events in the 1992 Summer Olympics and the 2000 Summer Olympics. She was born in Salt Lake City, Utah.
