= Mexico at the 1987 Pan American Games =

- IOC code: MEX
- NOC: Comité Olímpico Mexicano (in Spanish)

in Indianapolis August 7–23, 1987
- Medals Ranked 6th: Gold 9 Silver 11 Bronze 18 Total 38

Pan American Games appearances (overview)
- 1951; 1955; 1959; 1963; 1967; 1971; 1975; 1979; 1983; 1987; 1991; 1995; 1999; 2003; 2007; 2011; 2015; 2019; 2023; 2027

The 10th Pan American Games were held in Indianapolis, Indiana from August 7 to August 23, 1987.

== Medals ==
=== Gold ===
===== Athletics =====
1. Men's 5000 metres - Arturo Barrios
2. Men's 20 km road walk - Carlos Mercenario
3. Men's 50 km road walk - Martín Bermudez
4. Women's Marathon - María del Carmen Cárdenas
5. Women's 10,000 metre track walk - María Colín

===== Cycling =====
1. Men's Individual Race (Road, 171 km) - Luis Rosendo Ramos

===== Rowing =====
1. Women's Double sculls - Martha García & Ana Gamble

===== Taekwondo =====
1. Men's 76 kg - Ernesto Rodríguez

=== Silver ===
===== Archery =====
1. Men's team - Mexico
2. Women's team - Mexico

===== Athletics =====
1. Men's 50 km road walk - Raúl González

===== Cycling =====
1. Men's 50 km Points Race (Track) - José Youshimatz

===== Judo =====
1. Men's Light Middleweight (-78 kg) - Carlos Huttich

===== Rowing =====
1. Men's Single sculls - Joaquín Gómez
2. Men's Lightweight coxless four - Mexico

===== Taekwondo =====
1. Men's 54 kg - Ricardo Jallath

===== Tennis =====
1. Men's Doubles - Mexico

=== Bronze ===
===== Athletics =====
1. Men's Javelin throw - Juan de la Garza

===== Cycling =====
1. Men's Team Time Trial (Road, 100 km) - Mexico

===== Diving =====
1. Men's 3m Springboard - José Roche

===== Equestrian =====
1. Individual dressage - Margarita Nava
2. Team dressage - Mexico
3. Individual jumping - Alberto Valdés
4. Team jumping - Mexico

===== Fencing =====
1. Women's Team foil - Mexico

===== Gymnastics =====
1. Men's Pommel horse - Tony Piñeda
2. Men's Vault - Alejandro Peniche

===== Rowing =====
1. Women's Single sculls - Martha García
2. Women's Lightweight single sculls - Verónica Schreiber
3. Women's Lightweight double sculls - Mexico

===== Synchronized swimming =====
1. Duet - Lourdes Candini & Susana Candini
2. Team - Mexico

===== Taekwondo =====
1. Men's 58 kg - Federico Gómez

===== Tennis =====
1. Women's Doubles - Mexico

===== Wrestling =====
1. Men's Freestyle (– 57 kg) - Jorge Olivera

== See also ==
- Mexico at the 1990 Central American and Caribbean Games
- Mexico at the 1988 Summer Olympics
