= Denis Canuel =

Canadian archer (born 1962)

Personal information
- Born: 22 October 1962 (age 64) Schefferville, Quebec, Canada

Sport
- Sport: Archery

Denis Canuel (born 22 October 1962) is a Canadian archer. He competed in the men's individual and team events at the 1988 Summer Olympics in Seoul, reaching the qualification rounds.
