= Emilio Dutra e Mello =

Brazilian archer (born 1955)

Personal information
- Born: 12 May 1955 (age 70); Rio de Janeiro, Brazil

Sport
- Sport: Archery

Emilio Dutra e Mello (born 12 May 1955) is a Brazilian archer. He competed at the 1980, 1984, 1988 and the 1992 Summer Olympics.
