= Leroy Watson (archer) =

British archer (born 1966)

Medal record

Men's archery

Representing Great Britain

Olympic Games
| Bronze medal – third place | 1988 Seoul | Team |

Leroy Denver Watson (born 6 July 1966 in Broseley, Shropshire, Great Britain) is a British archer who was a member of the British squad that won the team bronze medals at the 1988 Summer Olympics. He also competed in the individual event, finishing in 18th place.
