= Darrell Pace =

American archer (born 1956)

Personal information
- Born: October 23, 1956 (age 69) Cincinnati, Ohio, United States
- Height: 5 ft 10 1/2 in (179 cm)
- Weight: 141 lb (64 kg)

Sport
- Sport: Archery
Medal record
Men's archery
Representing the United States
Olympic Games
Gold medal – first place	1976 Montreal	Individual
Gold medal – first place	1984 Los Angeles	Individual
Silver medal – second place	1988 Seoul	Team
Pan American Games
Gold medal – first place	1979 San Juan	Team
Gold medal – first place	1983 Caracas	Individual
Gold medal – first place	1983 Caracas	Team
Gold medal – first place	1987 Indianapolis	Team
Gold medal – first place	1991 Havana	Individual
Gold medal – first place	1991 Havana	Individual (70 m)
Silver medal – second place	1979 San Juan	Individual
Bronze medal – third place	1987 Indianapolis	Individual

Darrell Owen Pace (born October 23, 1956) is a former archer from the United States, who won two individual Olympic and World Championships titles each during his career. In 2011, as part of the World Archery Federation's 80th anniversary celebration, he was declared as by the WAF as "Archer of the Century"

== Career ==
Three years after taking up the sport, Pace, at the age of 16, became the youngest member of the U. S. team at the archery world championships, where he finished twenty-third.

Pace went on to win four consecutive national archery championships, from 1973 through 1976. He also won the title in 1978 and 1980. He won the world title in 1975 and 1979 and finished second to long-time rival Richard McKinney in 1983.

After winning an Olympic gold medal in 1976, Pace was selected for the 1980 Olympic team but did not compete due to the U.S. Olympic Committee's boycott of the 1980 Summer Olympics in Moscow, Soviet Union. He was one of 461 athletes to receive a Congressional Gold Medal instead. In 1984, he took a 13-point lead after the first day of the four-day competition and won an easy victory.

Pace also competed in the 1988 Summer Olympics, finishing ninth in the individual competition and winning a silver medal in the team event along with McKinney and Jay Barrs.

Darrell O. Pace Park, located in Hamilton, Ohio, is a 7-acre (2.8 ha) park named in his honor.

In 1974, at the US Nationals in Oxford, Ohio, Pace set his first FITA record of 1291 beating John Williams' record of 1268 shot at the 1972 Olympics. He broke that in 1975 at the Nationals with the first 1300 in history; he got 1316. In 1978, Ferrari from Italy broke that with a 1318. Darrell then shattered that the next year in 1979 with a 1341 in Japan; that record stood for 10 years. All in all Pace held the Total FITA world record for 14 years, raising the record a total of 71 points in 5 years.
