= Andrés Anchondo =

Mexican archer (born 1962)

Personal information
- Full name: José Andrés Anchondo García
- Born: 10 November 1962 (age 63) Chihuahua, Mexico

Sport
- Sport: Archery
Medal record
Representing Mexico
Pan American Games
Silver medal – second place	1987 Indianapolis	Recurve team
Silver medal – second place	1991 Havana	Recurve team

José Andrés Anchondo García (born 10 November 1962) is a Mexican archer. He competed at the 1988, 1992 and the 1996 Summer Olympics.

In 2015 he was named head coach of the archery team at the Autonomous University of Chihuahua.
