= Adolfo González (archer) =

Mexican archer (born 1962)

Personal information
- Nationality: Mexican
- Born: 27 September 1962 (age 62)

Sport
- Sport: Archery

Adolfo González Jiménez (born 27 September 1962) is a Mexican archer. He competed at the 1984 Summer Olympics, the 1988 Summer Olympics and the 1996 Summer Olympics.
