= Jay Barrs =

American archer (born 1962)

Personal information
- Full name: Jack Leonard Barrs, Jr.
- Born: July 17, 1962 (age 64) Jacksonville, Florida, U.S.
- Height: 5 ft 11 1/2 in (182 cm)
- Weight: 154 lb (70 kg)
Medal record
Men's archery
Representing the United States
Olympic Games
Gold medal – first place	1988 Seoul	Individual
Silver medal – second place	1988 Seoul	Team
World Championships
Bronze medal – third place	1999 Riom	Team (recurve)
World Games
Gold medal – first place	2001 Akita	Individual (recurve)
Pan American Games
Gold medal – first place	1987 Indianapolis	Individual
Gold medal – first place	1987 Indianapolis	Team
Silver medal – second place	1991 Havana	Individual (30 m)
Silver medal – second place	1991 Havana	Individual (90 m)

Jack Leonard "Jay" Barrs, Jr. (born July 17, 1962) is an American archer. He won a gold medal in the 1988 Summer Olympics. He is an NAA National Outdoor Champion and FITA World Field Champion, as well as a fourteen time NAA US Field Champion. Barrs was born in Jacksonville, Florida and graduated from Arizona State University. Jay currently lives in Utah where he coaches and mentors young archers through the US Archery Association's JOAD (Junior Olympic Archery Development) program.

== Olympic Tournament History ==
- 1992 Olympic Games: individual (5th), team (6th)
- 1988 Olympic Games: individual (1st), team (2nd)

== World Tournament History ==
- World Target Championships – 1999 (10th) team (3rd); 1995 (12th) team (3rd); 1989 (9th) team (2nd); 1987 (3rd) team (2nd)
- World Indoor Championships – 1991 (2nd)
- World Field Championships - `00 (8th), 1998 (4th), team (4th); 1994 (10th), 1992 (1st), 1990 (1st), 1988 (3rd)

== US National Tournaments ==
U.S. Outdoor Target Championships – 2000 (3rd), 1999 (4th), 1997 (3rd), 1996 (3rd), 1995 (8th), 1994 (1st), 1993 (1st), 1992 (2nd), 1991 (4th), 1990 (6th), 1989 (6th), 1988 (1st), 1987 (2nd), 1986 (3rd)

Year	Place
2000	3rd

- U.S. Indoor Target Championships – 2001 (11th), `00 (15th), 1999 (3rd-tie), 1997 (10th), 1996 (5th), 1995 (5th), 1994 (2nd), 1993 (1st), 1992 (1st), 1991 (2nd), 1990 (3rd), 1989 (6th), 1988 (1st), 1987 (1st)
- U.S. Field Championships – 2000 (1st), 1999 (1st), 1998 (1st), 1997 (1st), 1996 (1st), 1995 (1st), 1994 (1st), 1992 (1st), 1991 (1st), 1990 (1st), 1989 (2nd), 1988 (1st), 1987 (1st).
