= Archery at the 2014 Asian Games – Men's individual recurve =

Asian Games competition

Men's individual recurve at the 2014 Asian Games
- Venue: Gyeyang Asiad Archery Field
- Dates: 23–28 September 2014
- Competitors: 72 from 22 nations

Medalists
gold medal	Oh Jin-hyek	South Korea
silver medal	Yong Zhiwei	China
bronze medal	Kuo Cheng-wei	Chinese Taipei

The men's individual recurve archery competition at the 2014 Asian Games in Incheon was held from 23 to 28 September at Gyeyang Asiad Archery Field.

A total of 71 archers participated in the qualification round after one pulled out. Only the top two archers from each country were allowed to progress to the knockout stage.

== Schedule ==
All times are Korea Standard Time (UTC+09:00)

Date	Time	Event
Tuesday, 23 September 2014	14:30	Ranking round
Wednesday, 24 September 2014	14:30	Ranking round
Friday, 26 September 2014	10:40	1/32 eliminations
Friday, 26 September 2014	11:10	1/16 eliminations
Friday, 26 September 2014	11:40	1/8 eliminations
Friday, 26 September 2014	16:46	Quarterfinals
Sunday, 28 September 2014	14:58	Semifinals
Sunday, 28 September 2014	15:58	Bronze medal match
Sunday, 28 September 2014	16:12	Gold medal match

== Results ==
Legend

- DNS — Did not start

=== Ranking round ===
Rank	Seed	Athlete	Distance				Total	10s	Xs
Rank	Seed	Athlete	90m	70m	50m	30m	Total	10s	Xs
1	1	Lee Seung-yun (KOR)	331	348	342	356	1377	97	36
2	2	Oh Jin-hyek (KOR)	318	344	342	358	1362	88	33
3	—	Ku Bon-chan (KOR)	327	340	338	357	1362	81	42
4	—	Kim Woo-jin (KOR)	310	342	349	353	1354	79	36
5	3	Takaharu Furukawa (JPN)	318	343	331	355	1347	74	20
6	4	Khairul Anuar Mohamad (MAS)	317	339	335	353	1344	75	31
7	5	Hideki Kikuchi (JPN)	312	340	335	354	1341	73	25
8	6	Kuo Cheng-wei (TPE)	317	336	324	353	1330	64	25
9	7	Chen Hsin-fu (TPE)	309	325	335	351	1320	60	18
10	8	Gu Xuesong (CHN)	308	328	330	352	1318	62	24
11	9	Jantsangiin Gantögs (MGL)	311	329	328	350	1318	54	24
12	—	Qi Kaiyao (CHN)	305	332	332	347	1316	61	19
13	10	Atanu Das (IND)	305	331	332	348	1316	59	19
14	11	Jon Chol (PRK)	307	326	327	355	1315	67	20
15	—	Shohei Ota (JPN)	311	327	327	348	1313	56	22
16	12	Atiq Bazil Bakri (MAS)	310	327	324	351	1312	57	21
17	13	Jayanta Talukdar (IND)	296	330	328	353	1307	59	20
18	14	Pak Yong-won (PRK)	285	332	332	353	1302	60	15
19	15	Denis Gankin (KAZ)	296	333	323	350	1302	54	19
20	—	Chang Wei-hsiang (TPE)	304	321	327	349	1301	61	23
21	—	Hirokuni Sato (JPN)	298	328	325	350	1301	56	19
22	—	Tarundeep Rai (IND)	302	339	314	345	1300	54	17
23	—	Haziq Kamaruddin (MAS)	304	328	321	346	1299	50	19
24	—	Wang Hou-chieh (TPE)	297	331	322	348	1298	52	21
25	—	Rahul Banerjee (IND)	298	314	332	352	1296	53	19
26	16	Yong Zhiwei (CHN)	298	329	315	352	1294	55	23
27	17	Artyom Gankin (KAZ)	301	330	325	330	1286	55	18
28	18	Ruman Shana (BAN)	312	317	316	341	1286	44	16
29	—	Oibek Saidiyev (KAZ)	297	323	324	341	1285	51	19
30	19	Shiek Sojeb (BAN)	284	330	323	345	1282	56	16
31	—	Mohd Ikram Joni (MAS)	288	327	318	347	1280	48	13
32	—	Sanzhar Mussayev (KAZ)	304	315	316	345	1280	47	24
33	20	Witthaya Thamwong (THA)	310	318	307	341	1276	44	10
34	21	Ganzorigiin Myagmardorj (MGL)	293	323	304	348	1268	53	15
35	22	Lee Kar Wai (HKG)	289	316	324	338	1267	43	15
36	—	Emdadul Haque Milon (BAN)	297	318	302	350	1267	41	16
37	23	Nay Myo Aung (MYA)	284	323	318	339	1264	36	8
38	—	Li Jialun (CHN)	295	311	317	338	1261	38	20
39	24	Ibrahim Al-Mohanadi (QAT)	289	314	314	341	1258	41	14
40	25	Khomkrit Duangsuwan (THA)	301	316	304	330	1251	44	14
41	26	Ma Hing Kin (HKG)	280	324	308	337	1249	45	13
42	27	Jit Bahadur Muktan (NEP)	270	308	312	341	1231	43	9
43	28	Robert Nam (TJK)	266	306	314	345	1231	40	16
44	—	Gombodorjiin Gan-Erdene (MGL)	286	314	316	307	1223	45	15
45	—	Chui Chun Man (HKG)	271	311	304	336	1222	29	5
46	—	Prennoy Murong (BAN)	275	309	295	341	1220	39	14
47	29	Ali Ahmed Salem (QAT)	258	310	308	338	1214	33	9
48	—	Baasanjavyn Dolgorsüren (MGL)	292	309	310	297	1208	43	14
49	30	Jamshid Sodikov (UZB)	246	301	314	337	1198	35	8
50	31	Mohammed Mahmood (IRQ)	275	308	283	327	1193	31	6
51	—	Itsarin Thai-uea (THA)	256	299	300	337	1192	28	11
52	32	Sami Al-Bawardi (KSA)	232	308	308	337	1185	38	8
53	33	Ramesh Bhattachan (NEP)	245	305	292	338	1180	37	8
54	34	Jigme Norbu (BHU)	252	309	276	338	1175	30	11
55	35	Kinley Tshering (BHU)	271	298	278	327	1174	22	12
56	—	Ri Hyo-song (PRK)	261	249	315	334	1159	31	12
57	—	Prem Prasad Pun (NEP)	244	263	301	335	1143	28	14
58	36	Dilshod Akhmadov (UZB)	245	284	271	336	1136	25	7
59	—	Farhan Monser (QAT)	235	284	280	321	1120	22	5
60	37	Abdulaziz Al-Kurbi (KSA)	224	287	290	311	1112	20	7
61	—	Karma Tshering (BHU)	195	288	289	316	1088	16	2
62	38	Ahmad Al-Shatti (KUW)	223	257	284	304	1068	16	4
63	—	Obai Arafat (KSA)	199	272	275	317	1063	12	3
64	—	Sardor Rustamov (UZB)	259	273	188	335	1055	21	8
65	—	Mohammed Al-Abdulmuhsin (KSA)	186	252	273	312	1023	20	4
66	39	Mohammad Musallam (KUW)	202	275	226	314	1017	20	3
67	40	Kylychbek Nurmanbetov (KGZ)	198	258	259	300	1015	10	3
68	—	Ashim Sherchan (NEP)	0	316	296	341	953	34	10
69	—	Amet Umerov (UZB)	0	307	301	339	947	31	9
70	—	Kim Chol (PRK)	0	308	301	336	945	34	12
71	—	Fahad Al-Rashidi (KUW)	193	219	200	299	911	10	1
—	—	Abdullah Malallah (KUW)					DNS		

=== Knockout round ===
==== Finals ====
Quarterfinals
16	Yong Zhiwei (CHN)	27	29	27	29	6
8	Gu Xuesong (CHN)	26	27	29	27	2
5	Hideki Kikuchi (JPN)	28	28	28	27	28	10^{*}	6
4	Khairul Anuar Mohamad (MAS)	27	30	28	28	27	10	5
14	Pak Yong-won (PRK)	28	26	27	28	26	4
6	Kuo Cheng-wei (TPE)	30	26	29	27	26	6
10	Atanu Das (IND)	28	25	28	0
2	Oh Jin-hyek (KOR)	29	29	29	6

Semifinals
16	Yong Zhiwei (CHN)	28	27	28	28	29	7
5	Hideki Kikuchi (JPN)	29	25	25	28	28	3
6	Kuo Cheng-wei (TPE)	27	27	26	0
2	Oh Jin-hyek (KOR)	29	29	30	6

Gold medal match
16	Yong Zhiwei (CHN)	29	30	27	27	26	4
2	Oh Jin-hyek (KOR)	27	27	30	28	27	6
Bronze medal match
5	Hideki Kikuchi (JPN)	27	27	26	27	2
6	Kuo Cheng-wei (TPE)	27	28	29	27	6

==== Section 1 ====
1/32 eliminations							1/16 eliminations								1/8 eliminations
							1	Lee Seung-yun (KOR)	30	29	28			6
33	Ramesh Bhattachan (NEP)	22	24	22	24	2	32	Sami Al-Bawardi (KSA)	24	27	23			0
32	Sami Al-Bawardi (KSA)	11	25	24	27	6									1	Lee Seung-yun (KOR)	26	27	27	28	28	9	5
															16	Yong Zhiwei (CHN)	28	26	27	29	27	9^{*}	6
							17	Artyom Gankin (KAZ)	27	28	28	28	25	3
							16	Yong Zhiwei (CHN)	29	28	30	27	27	7

==== Section 2 ====
1/32 eliminations						1/16 eliminations							1/8 eliminations
						9	Jantsangiin Gantögs (MGL)	29	28	27		6
						24	Ibrahim Al-Mohanadi (QAT)	25	27	25		0
													9	Jantsangiin Gantögs (MGL)	28	28	26	29	27	8	5
25	Khomkrit Duangsuwan (THA)	26	25	28	6								8	Gu Xuesong (CHN)	30	26	29	26	27	9	6
40	Kylychbek Nurmanbetov (KGZ)	22	18	24	0	25	Khomkrit Duangsuwan (THA)	28	29	25	27	2
						8	Gu Xuesong (CHN)	26	30	26	29	6

==== Section 3 ====
1/32 eliminations									1/16 eliminations								1/8 eliminations
									5	Hideki Kikuchi (JPN)	27	26	28	26		6
37	Abdulaziz Al-Kurbi (KSA)	25	25	26	21	23	8	5	28	Robert Nam (TJK)	27	23	26	26		2
28	Robert Nam (TJK)	25	24	25	25	25	10	6									5	Hideki Kikuchi (JPN)	29	28	29	28	7
																	12	Atiq Bazil Bakri (MAS)	26	28	28	25	1
									21	Ganzorigiin Myagmardorj (MGL)	26	27	28	28	26	4
									12	Atiq Bazil Bakri (MAS)	28	28	27	26	27	6

==== Section 4 ====
1/32 eliminations								1/16 eliminations							1/8 eliminations
								13	Jayanta Talukdar (IND)	27	27	29		6
								20	Witthaya Thamwong (THA)	25	25	27		0
															13	Jayanta Talukdar (IND)	29	27	28	26	1
29	Ali Ahmed Salem (QAT)	22	24	24	27	17	6								4	Khairul Anuar Mohamad (MAS)	30	28	28	29	7
36	Dilshod Akhmadov (UZB)	25	26	22	22	15	4	29	Ali Ahmed Salem (QAT)	28	26	24	18	2
								4	Khairul Anuar Mohamad (MAS)	27	29	27	27	6

==== Section 5 ====
1/32 eliminations								1/16 eliminations									1/8 eliminations
								3	Takaharu Furukawa (JPN)	29	25	27	26	27	9	5
35	Kinley Tshering (BHU)	23	23	27	24	28	6	35	Kinley Tshering (BHU)	19	24	28	28	27	10	6
30	Jamshid Sodikov (UZB)	27	26	24	18	23	4										35	Kinley Tshering (BHU)	27	26	24	27	1
																	14	Pak Yong-won (PRK)	27	27	26	28	7
								19	Shiek Sojeb (BAN)	28	21	26				0
								14	Pak Yong-won (PRK)	30	27	27				6

==== Section 6 ====
1/32 eliminations						1/16 eliminations							1/8 eliminations
						11	Jon Chol (PRK)	23	28	26	27	2
						22	Lee Kar Wai (HKG)	28	26	28	28	6
													22	Lee Kar Wai (HKG)	27	28	27	26	2
27	Jit Bahadur Muktan (NEP)	26	29	28	6								6	Kuo Cheng-wei (TPE)	27	28	28	27	6
38	Ahmad Al-Shatti (KUW)	21	20	20	0	27	Jit Bahadur Muktan (NEP)	28	25	26	27	2
						6	Kuo Cheng-wei (TPE)	27	28	29	29	6

==== Section 7 ====
1/32 eliminations							1/16 eliminations							1/8 eliminations
							7	Chen Hsin-fu (TPE)	27	27	26	29	6
39	Mohammad Musallam (KUW)	20	24	29	24	2	26	Ma Hing Kin (HKG)	23	27	26	26	2
26	Ma Hing Kin (HKG)	23	26	27	26	6								7	Chen Hsin-fu (TPE)	28	29	26	24	2
														10	Atanu Das (IND)	30	26	28	25	6
							23	Nay Myo Aung (MYA)	24	26	24		0
							10	Atanu Das (IND)	29	29	28		6

==== Section 8 ====
1/32 eliminations							1/16 eliminations							1/8 eliminations
							15	Denis Gankin (KAZ)	27	29	27	29	7
							18	Ruman Shana (BAN)	26	28	27	26	1
														15	Denis Gankin (KAZ)	30	27	27	27	2
31	Mohammed Mahmood (IRQ)	26	27	25	25	6								2	Oh Jin-hyek (KOR)	29	29	28	29	6
34	Jigme Norbu (BHU)	19	20	27	18	2	31	Mohammed Mahmood (IRQ)	25	24	24		0
							2	Oh Jin-hyek (KOR)	27	28	30		6
