= Archery at the 2014 Asian Games – Men's team recurve =

Asian Games competition

Men's team recurve at the 2014 Asian Games
- Venue: Gyeyang Asiad Archery Field
- Dates: 23–28 September 2014
- Competitors: 68 from 18 nations

Medalists
gold medal	China; Gu Xuesong, Qi Kaiyao, Yong Zhiwei
silver medal	Malaysia; Atiq Bazil Bakri, Haziq Kamaruddin, Khairul Anuar Mohamad
bronze medal	South Korea; Ku Bon-chan, Lee Seung-yun, Oh Jin-hyek

The men's team recurve archery competition at the 2014 Asian Games in Incheon was held from 23 to 28 September 2014 at Gyeyang Asiad Archery Field.

A total of 18 teams participated in the qualification round, but only 16 progressed to the knockout round. Each team consisted of the highest ranked three athletes from the qualification round.

== Schedule ==
All times are Korea Standard Time (UTC+09:00)

Date	Time	Event
Tuesday, 23 September 2014	14:30	Ranking round
Wednesday, 24 September 2014	14:30	Ranking round
Friday, 26 September 2014	09:30	1/8 eliminations
Friday, 26 September 2014	10:00	Quarterfinals
Friday, 26 September 2014	14:50	Semifinals
Sunday, 28 September 2014	10:50	Bronze medal match
Sunday, 28 September 2014	11:15	Gold medal match

== Results ==
Legend

- DNS — Did not start

=== Ranking round ===
Rank	Team	Distance				Total	10s	Xs
Rank	Team	90m	70m	50m	30m	Total	10s	Xs
1	South Korea (KOR)	976	1032	1022	1071	4101	266	111
	Kim Woo-jin	~~310~~	~~342~~	~~349~~	~~353~~	~~1354~~	~~79~~	~~36~~
	Ku Bon-chan	327	340	338	357	1362	81	42
	Lee Seung-yun	331	348	342	356	1377	97	36
	Oh Jin-hyek	318	344	342	358	1362	88	33
2	Japan (JPN)	941	1010	993	1057	4001	203	67
	Takaharu Furukawa	318	343	331	355	1347	74	20
	Hideki Kikuchi	312	340	335	354	1341	73	25
	Shohei Ota	311	327	327	348	1313	56	22
	Hirokuni Sato	~~298~~	~~328~~	~~325~~	~~350~~	~~1301~~	~~56~~	~~19~~
3	Malaysia (MAS)	931	994	980	1050	3955	182	71
	Atiq Bazil Bakri	310	327	324	351	1312	57	21
	Mohd Ikram Joni	~~288~~	~~327~~	~~318~~	~~347~~	~~1280~~	~~48~~	~~13~~
	Haziq Kamaruddin	304	328	321	346	1299	50	19
	Khairul Anuar Mohamad	317	339	335	353	1344	75	31
4	Chinese Taipei (TPE)	930	982	986	1053	3951	185	66
	Chang Wei-hsiang	304	321	327	349	1301	61	23
	Chen Hsin-fu	309	325	335	351	1320	60	18
	Kuo Cheng-wei	317	336	324	353	1330	64	25
	Wang Hou-chieh	~~297~~	~~331~~	~~322~~	~~348~~	~~1298~~	~~52~~	~~21~~
5	China (CHN)	911	989	977	1051	3928	178	66
	Gu Xuesong	308	328	330	352	1318	62	24
	Li Jialun	~~295~~	~~311~~	~~317~~	~~338~~	~~1261~~	~~38~~	~~20~~
	Qi Kaiyao	305	332	332	347	1316	61	19
	Yong Zhiwei	298	329	315	352	1294	55	23
6	India (IND)	903	1000	974	1046	3923	172	56
	Rahul Banerjee	~~298~~	~~314~~	~~332~~	~~352~~	~~1296~~	~~53~~	~~19~~
	Atanu Das	305	331	332	348	1316	59	19
	Tarundeep Rai	302	339	314	345	1300	54	17
	Jayanta Talukdar	296	330	328	353	1307	59	20
7	Kazakhstan (KAZ)	894	986	972	1021	3873	160	56
	Artyom Gankin	301	330	325	330	1286	55	18
	Denis Gankin	296	333	323	350	1302	54	19
	Sanzhar Mussayev	~~304~~	~~315~~	~~316~~	~~345~~	~~1280~~	~~47~~	~~24~~
	Oibek Saidiyev	297	323	324	341	1285	51	19
8	Bangladesh (BAN)	893	965	941	1036	3835	141	48
	Emdadul Haque Milon	297	318	302	350	1267	41	16
	Prennoy Murong	~~275~~	~~309~~	~~295~~	~~341~~	~~1220~~	~~39~~	~~14~~
	Ruman Shana	312	317	316	341	1286	44	16
	Shiek Sojeb	284	330	323	345	1282	56	16
9	Mongolia (MGL)	890	966	948	1005	3809	152	54
	Baasanjavyn Dolgorsüren	~~292~~	~~309~~	~~310~~	~~297~~	~~1208~~	~~43~~	~~14~~
	Gombodorjiin Gan-Erdene	286	314	316	307	1223	45	15
	Jantsangiin Gantögs	311	329	328	350	1318	54	24
	Ganzorigiin Myagmardorj	293	323	304	348	1268	53	15
10	North Korea (PRK)	853	907	974	1042	3776	158	47
	Jon Chol	307	326	327	355	1315	67	20
	Kim Chol	~~0~~	~~308~~	~~301~~	~~336~~	~~945~~	~~34~~	~~12~~
	Pak Yong-won	285	332	332	353	1302	60	15
	Ri Hyo-song	261	249	315	334	1159	31	12
11	Hong Kong (HKG)	840	951	936	1011	3738	117	33
	Chui Chun Man	271	311	304	336	1222	29	5
	Lee Kar Wai	289	316	324	338	1267	43	15
	Ma Hing Kin	280	324	308	337	1249	45	13
12	Thailand (THA)	867	933	911	1008	3719	116	35
	Khomkrit Duangsuwan	301	316	304	330	1251	44	14
	Itsarin Thai-uea	256	299	300	337	1192	28	11
	Witthaya Thamwong	310	318	307	341	1276	44	10
13	Qatar (QAT)	782	908	902	1000	3592	96	28
	Ibrahim Al-Mohanadi	289	314	314	341	1258	41	14
	Farhan Monser	235	284	280	321	1120	22	5
	Ali Ahmed Salem	258	310	308	338	1214	33	9
14	Nepal (NEP)	759	876	905	1014	3554	108	31
	Ramesh Bhattachan	245	305	292	338	1180	37	8
	Jit Bahadur Muktan	270	308	312	341	1231	43	9
	Prem Prasad Pun	244	263	301	335	1143	28	14
	Ashim Sherchan	~~0~~	~~316~~	~~296~~	~~341~~	~~953~~	~~34~~	~~10~~
15	Bhutan (BHU)	718	895	843	981	3437	68	25
	Jigme Norbu	252	309	276	338	1175	30	11
	Karma Tshering	195	288	289	316	1088	16	2
	Kinley Tshering	271	298	278	327	1174	22	12
16	Uzbekistan (UZB)	750	858	773	1008	3389	81	23
	Dilshod Akhmadov	245	284	271	336	1136	25	7
	Sardor Rustamov	259	273	188	335	1055	21	8
	Jamshid Sodikov	246	301	314	337	1198	35	8
	Amet Umerov	~~0~~	~~307~~	~~301~~	~~339~~	~~947~~	~~31~~	~~9~~
17	Saudi Arabia (KSA)	655	867	873	965	3360	70	18
	Mohammed Al-Abdulmuhsin	~~186~~	~~252~~	~~273~~	~~312~~	~~1023~~	~~20~~	~~4~~
	Sami Al-Bawardi	232	308	308	337	1185	38	8
	Abdulaziz Al-Kurbi	224	287	290	311	1112	20	7
	Obai Arafat	199	272	275	317	1063	12	3
18	Kuwait (KUW)	618	751	710	917	2996	46	8
	Fahad Al-Rashidi	193	219	200	299	911	10	1
	Ahmad Al-Shatti	223	257	284	304	1068	16	4
	Abdullah Malallah					~~DNS~~		
	Mohammad Musallam	202	275	226	314	1017	20	3

=== Knockout round ===
1/8 eliminations
1	South Korea	56	57	57	6
16	Uzbekistan	52	44	52	0
9	Mongolia	54	49	52	54	29	5
8	Bangladesh	52	55	47	55	26	4
5	China	55	56	54	6
12	Thailand	50	50	41	0
13	Qatar	48	49	45	0
4	Chinese Taipei	58	55	52	6
3	Malaysia	52	52	56	5
14	Nepal	52	47	51	1
11	Hong Kong	54	42	51	53	5
6	India	53	54	51	52	3
7	Kazakhstan	56	48	52	53	2
10	North Korea	54	52	55	55	6
15	Bhutan	45	53	33	0
2	Japan	57	55	52	6

Quarterfinals
1	South Korea	57	56	55	6
9	Mongolia	49	49	52	0
5	China	52	59	56	55	6
4	Chinese Taipei	54	55	52	54	2
3	Malaysia	57	55	54	6
11	Hong Kong	51	54	49	0
10	North Korea	54	53	55	54	3
2	Japan	54	55	55	54	5

Semifinals
1	South Korea	56	55	59	58	28	4
5	China	53	58	57	59	28^{*}	5
3	Malaysia	59	54	54	5
2	Japan	56	53	54	1

Gold medal match
5	China	57	57	58	6
3	Malaysia	54	53	57	0
Bronze medal match
1	South Korea	57	56	56	57	5
2	Japan	56	56	58	55	3
