= Archery at the 2014 Asian Games =

- Venue: Gyeyang Asiad Archery Field
- Dates: 23–28 September 2014
- Competitors: 222 from 27 nations

Archery at the 2014 Asian Games was held in Gyeyang Asiad Archery Field, Incheon, South Korea from 23 to 28 September 2014. Four competitions were held in men and women's recurve and in men and women's compound.

== Schedule ==
R	Ranking round	E	Elimination rounds	S	Semifinals	F	Finals

Event↓/Date →	23rd Tue	24th Wed	25th Thu		26th Fri		27th Sat		28th Sun	
Men's individual recurve	R	R			E				S	F
Men's team recurve	R	R			E	S			F	
Men's individual compound	R		E				S	F		
Men's team compound	R		E	S			F			
Women's individual recurve	R	R			E				S	F
Women's team recurve	R	R			E	S			F	
Women's individual compound	R		E				S	F		
Women's team compound	R		E	S			F			

== Medalists ==
=== Recurve ===
Event	Gold	Silver	Bronze
Men's individual	Oh Jin-hyek; South Korea	Yong Zhiwei; China	Kuo Cheng-wei; Chinese Taipei
Men's team	China; Gu Xuesong; Qi Kaiyao; Yong Zhiwei	Malaysia; Atiq Bazil Bakri; Haziq Kamaruddin; Khairul Anuar Mohamad	South Korea; Ku Bon-chan; Lee Seung-yun; Oh Jin-hyek
Women's individual	Jung Dasomi; South Korea	Chang Hye-jin; South Korea	Xu Jing; China
Women's team	South Korea; Chang Hye-jin; Jung Dasomi; Lee Tuk-young	China; Cheng Ming; Xu Jing; Zhu Jueman	Japan; Ren Hayakawa; Yuki Hayashi; Kaori Kawanaka

=== Compound ===
Event	Gold	Silver	Bronze
Men's individual	Esmaeil Ebadi; Iran	Abhishek Verma; India	Paul Dela Cruz; Philippines
Men's team	India; Rajat Chauhan; Sandeep Kumar; Abhishek Verma	South Korea; Choi Yong-hee; Min Li-hong; Yang Young-ho	Iran; Esmaeil Ebadi; Majid Gheidi; Amir Kazempour
Women's individual	Choi Bo-min; South Korea	Seok Ji-hyun; South Korea	Trisha Deb; India
Women's team	South Korea; Choi Bo-min; Kim Yun-hee; Seok Ji-hyun	Chinese Taipei; Chen Li-ju; Huang I-jou; Wu Ting-ting	India; Trisha Deb; Purvasha Shende; Jyothi Surekha

== Medal table ==
Rank	Nation	Gold	Silver	Bronze	Total
1	South Korea (KOR)	5	3	1	9
2	China (CHN)	1	2	1	4
3	India (IND)	1	1	2	4
4	Iran (IRI)	1	0	1	2
5	Chinese Taipei (TPE)	0	1	1	2
6	Malaysia (MAS)	0	1	0	1
7	Japan (JPN)	0	0	1	1
7	Philippines (PHI)	0	0	1	1
Totals (8 entries)		8	8	8	24

== Participating nations ==
A total of 222 athletes from 27 nations competed in archery at the 2014 Asian Games:

- Bangladesh (8)
- Bhutan (4)
- China (8)
- Chinese Taipei (16)
- Hong Kong (7)
- India (16)
- Indonesia (9)
- Iran (8)
- Iraq (6)
- Japan (9)
- Kazakhstan (16)
- Kuwait (6)
- Kyrgyzstan (2)
- Laos (6)
- Malaysia (8)
- Mongolia (14)
- Myanmar (5)
- Nepal (8)
- North Korea (8)
- Philippines (7)
- Qatar (7)
- Saudi Arabia (8)
- South Korea (16)
- Tajikistan (2)
- Thailand (4)
- Uzbekistan (8)
- Vietnam (6)
