= Archery at the 2010 Asian Games – Men's individual =

Men's individual recurve at the 2010 Asian Games
- Venue: Aoti Archery Range
- Dates: 20–24 November 2010
- Competitors: 62 from 18 nations

Medalists
gold medal	Kim Woo-jin	South Korea
silver medal	Tarundeep Rai	India
bronze medal	Sung Chia-chun	Chinese Taipei

The men's individual recurve archery competition at the 2010 Asian Games in Guangzhou was held from 20 November to 24 November at Aoti Archery Range.

== Schedule ==
All times are China Standard Time (UTC+08:00)

Date	Time	Event
Saturday, 20 November 2010	09:00	Qualification round
Wednesday, 24 November 2010	09:00	1/32 eliminations
Wednesday, 24 November 2010	09:30	1/16 eliminations
Wednesday, 24 November 2010	10:00	1/8 eliminations
Wednesday, 24 November 2010	14:30	1/4 eliminations
Wednesday, 24 November 2010	15:30	Semifinals
Wednesday, 24 November 2010	16:00	Bronze medal match
Wednesday, 24 November 2010	16:15	Gold medal match

== Results ==
=== Qualification round ===
Rank	Seed	Athlete	Distance				Total	10s	Xs
Rank	Seed	Athlete	90m	70m	50m	30m	Total	10s	Xs
1	1	Kim Woo-jin (KOR)	333	349	345	360	1387	74	23
2	2	Oh Jin-hyek (KOR)	318	345	345	358	1366	89	40
3	—	Im Dong-hyun (KOR)	331	333	339	358	1361	80	32
4	—	Lee Chang-hwan (KOR)	328	336	342	349	1355	73	39
5	3	Chen Wenyuan (CHN)	315	333	342	358	1348	83	41
6	4	Takaharu Furukawa (JPN)	314	337	341	356	1348	79	30
7	5	Xing Yu (CHN)	318	338	338	354	1348	72	38
8	6	Rahul Banerjee (IND)	317	329	337	352	1335	67	26
9	7	Tarundeep Rai (IND)	314	330	335	353	1332	66	25
10	—	Mangal Singh Champia (IND)	307	333	338	353	1331	73	24
11	8	Ryota Amano (JPN)	312	329	333	357	1331	66	20
12	—	Jayanta Talukdar (IND)	313	324	341	352	1330	64	22
13	—	Dai Xiaoxiang (CHN)	315	330	334	351	1330	60	27
14	9	Kuo Cheng-wei (TPE)	310	329	339	351	1329	67	28
15	10	Cheng Chu Sian (MAS)	310	331	333	351	1325	60	23
16	11	Sung Chia-chun (TPE)	305	332	334	353	1324	68	32
17	—	Chen Szu-yuan (TPE)	308	335	331	350	1324	66	26
18	—	Hideki Kikuchi (JPN)	311	327	332	354	1324	59	21
19	12	Milad Vaziri (IRI)	315	322	331	355	1323	65	23
20	13	Keivan Riazimehr (IRI)	308	325	334	354	1321	67	23
21	14	Gombodorjiin Gan-Erdene (MGL)	314	321	329	349	1313	54	14
22	—	Zhao Shenzhou (CHN)	306	325	328	348	1307	55	24
23	15	Izzudin Abdul Rahim (MAS)	302	327	332	344	1305	58	22
24	—	Nader Manouchehri (IRI)	296	326	333	347	1302	54	25
25	16	Witthaya Thamwong (THA)	305	321	323	351	1300	49	19
26	17	Jantsangiin Gantögs (MGL)	307	319	326	348	1300	41	10
27	18	Zaw Win Htike (MYA)	306	319	326	344	1295	49	15
28	19	Yan Aung Soe (MYA)	296	324	323	348	1291	52	17
29	20	Khomkrit Duangsuwan (THA)	304	323	320	340	1287	36	11
30	21	Oibek Saidiyev (KAZ)	294	316	326	349	1285	45	21
31	22	Mark Javier (PHI)	286	322	329	347	1284	43	10
32	23	Ashim Sherchan (NEP)	297	314	321	348	1280	44	13
33	—	Tien Kang (TPE)	294	331	320	332	1277	58	16
34	—	Hamed Fouri (IRI)	288	320	315	354	1277	51	22
35	24	Konstantin Kim (KAZ)	283	324	323	346	1276	49	19
36	25	Emdadul Haque Milon (BAN)	287	322	320	346	1275	49	17
37	—	Baasanjavyn Dolgorsüren (MGL)	295	318	322	340	1275	46	19
38	26	Đào Trọng Kiên (VIE)	287	323	318	346	1274	45	7
39	27	Jit Bahadur Muktan (NEP)	301	309	321	342	1273	45	15
40	—	Masashi Miyahara (JPN)	291	316	316	347	1270	44	16
41	—	Denchai Thepna (THA)	295	301	324	341	1261	27	8
42	28	Shiek Sojeb (BAN)	275	306	323	346	1250	42	15
43	—	Wan Khalmizam (MAS)	289	309	309	342	1249	38	18
44	—	Baatarjavyn Zolboo (MGL)	293	305	307	339	1244	35	10
45	—	Arif Farhan (MAS)	272	310	315	342	1239	38	7
46	—	Wachiranarong Tinrasri (THA)	287	309	308	334	1238	41	12
47	—	Ramesh Bhattachan (NEP)	271	310	318	338	1237	40	20
48	—	Artyom Gankin (KAZ)	291	291	306	344	1232	31	10
49	—	Ziaul Hoq Zia (BAN)	289	307	299	332	1227	9	2
50	29	Delfin Adriano (PHI)	263	306	319	338	1226	33	10
51	—	Nay Myo Aung (MYA)	272	298	313	342	1225	40	18
52	30	Indranath Perera (SRI)	272	298	307	343	1220	36	16
53	31	Lakmal Rajasinghe (SRI)	269	312	296	331	1208	21	4
54	—	Nipun Senevirathne (SRI)	272	312	290	331	1205	31	11
55	32	Hoàng Ngọc Nhật (VIE)	265	303	301	331	1200	32	15
56	33	Ali Ahmed Salem (QAT)	247	300	307	333	1187	31	12
57	—	Vũ Văn Dũng (VIE)	254	283	303	338	1178	29	6
58	34	Israf Khan (QAT)	249	274	288	333	1144	23	4
59	35	Dzhamoliddin Shamsudinov (TJK)	233	286	293	331	1143	23	10
60	—	Khadher Monser (QAT)	265	278	270	324	1137	21	4
61	—	Prem Prasad Pun (NEP)	241	261	281	311	1094	29	5
62	—	Farhan Monser (QAT)	206	298	268	318	1090	20	8

=== Knockout round ===
==== Finals ====
1/4 eliminations
1	Kim Woo-jin (KOR)	30	29	30	6
8	Ryota Amano (JPN)	29	28	26	0
5	Xing Yu (CHN)	27	28	29	30	6
4	Takaharu Furukawa (JPN)	29	26	27	26	2
3	Chen Wenyuan (CHN)	25	27	27	28	2
11	Sung Chia-chun (TPE)	26	24	29	30	6
7	Tarundeep Rai (IND)	26	30	28	29	28	6
2	Oh Jin-hyek (KOR)	27	26	28	27	28	4

Semifinals
1	Kim Woo-jin (KOR)	28	29	29	29	6
5	Xing Yu (CHN)	28	29	27	27	2
11	Sung Chia-chun (TPE)	29	30	27	26	28	3
7	Tarundeep Rai (IND)	29	26	30	28	29	7

Gold medal match
1	Kim Woo-jin (KOR)	28	28	28	28	29	7
7	Tarundeep Rai (IND)	28	27	29	27	27	3
Bronze medal match
5	Xing Yu (CHN)	27	28	27	28	29	9	5
11	Sung Chia-chun (TPE)	28	28	28	26	26	9^{*}	6

==== Section 1 ====
1/32 eliminations						1/16 eliminations						1/8 eliminations
						1	Kim Woo-jin (KOR)	57	57		4
33	Ali Ahmed Salem (QAT)	49	51	49	2	32	Hoàng Ngọc Nhật (VIE)	50	49		0
32	Hoàng Ngọc Nhật (VIE)	51	51	49	4							1	Kim Woo-jin (KOR)	29	28	27	28	29	6
												17	Jantsangiin Gantögs (MGL)	28	29	28	25	27	4
						17	Jantsangiin Gantögs (MGL)	56	53	53	5
						16	Witthaya Thamwong (THA)	51	53	52	1

==== Section 2 ====
1/32 eliminations	1/16 eliminations							1/8 eliminations
	9	Kuo Cheng-wei (TPE)	56	53	53	9^{*}	4
	24	Konstantin Kim (KAZ)	46	53	54	9	3
								9	Kuo Cheng-wei (TPE)	28	27	27	26	2
								8	Ryota Amano (JPN)	28	27	29	29	6
	25	Emdadul Haque Milon (BAN)	55	55			0
	8	Ryota Amano (JPN)	56	58			4

==== Section 3 ====
1/32 eliminations	1/16 eliminations						1/8 eliminations
	5	Xing Yu (CHN)	57	56		4
	28	Shiek Sojeb (BAN)	54	49		0
							5	Xing Yu (CHN)	26	29	28	6
							21	Oibek Saidiyev (KAZ)	23	26	27	0
	21	Oibek Saidiyev (KAZ)	56	54	55	5
	12	Milad Vaziri (IRI)	55	54	53	1

==== Section 4 ====
1/32 eliminations	1/16 eliminations						1/8 eliminations
	13	Keivan Riazimehr (IRI)	54	56		4
	20	Khomkrit Duangsuwan (THA)	51	54		0
							13	Keivan Riazimehr (IRI)	27	26	26	27	24	3
							4	Takaharu Furukawa (JPN)	27	27	28	26	28	7
	29	Delfin Adriano (PHI)	51	53	51	2
	4	Takaharu Furukawa (JPN)	56	52	56	4

==== Section 5 ====
1/32 eliminations					1/16 eliminations							1/8 eliminations
					3	Chen Wenyuan (CHN)	59	52			4
35	Dzhamoliddin Shamsudinov (TJK)	52	48	4	35	Dzhamoliddin Shamsudinov (TJK)	47	49			0
30	Indranath Perera (SRI)	50	47	0								3	Chen Wenyuan (CHN)	28	30	28	29	6
												14	Gombodorjiin Gan-Erdene (MGL)	29	28	26	25	2
					19	Yan Aung Soe (MYA)	56	55	53	9	3
					14	Gombodorjiin Gan-Erdene (MGL)	56	54	54	9^{*}	4

==== Section 6 ====
1/32 eliminations	1/16 eliminations					1/8 eliminations
	11	Sung Chia-chun (TPE)	54	54	4
	22	Mark Javier (PHI)	51	51	0
						11	Sung Chia-chun (TPE)	28	25	26	6
						6	Rahul Banerjee (IND)	27	24	24	0
	27	Jit Bahadur Muktan (NEP)	53	52	0
	6	Rahul Banerjee (IND)	58	53	4

==== Section 7 ====
1/32 eliminations	1/16 eliminations						1/8 eliminations
	7	Tarundeep Rai (IND)	58	57	56	5
	26	Đào Trọng Kiên (VIE)	46	57	50	1
							7	Tarundeep Rai (IND)	29	30	27	29	6
							10	Cheng Chu Sian (MAS)	28	28	28	28	2
	23	Ashim Sherchan (NEP)	54	56		0
	10	Cheng Chu Sian (MAS)	55	57		4

==== Section 8 ====
1/32 eliminations					1/16 eliminations					1/8 eliminations
					15	Izzudin Abdul Rahim (MAS)	57	58	4
					18	Zaw Win Htike (MYA)	53	51	0
										15	Izzudin Abdul Rahim (MAS)	29	28	25	27	28	3
31	Lakmal Rajasinghe (SRI)	55	56	4						2	Oh Jin-hyek (KOR)	26	28	27	30	30	7
34	Israf Khan (QAT)	49	50	0	31	Lakmal Rajasinghe (SRI)	53	51	0
					2	Oh Jin-hyek (KOR)	54	55	4
