= South Korea at the 2014 Asian Games =

- IOC code: KOR
- NOC: Korean Olympic Committee

in Incheon
- Competitors: 831 in 36 sports
- Flag bearers: Kim Hyeon-woo (opening); Yeo Hosua (closing)
- Officials: 237
- Medals Ranked 2nd: Gold 79 Silver 70 Bronze 79 Total 228

Asian Games appearances (overview)
- 1954; 1958; 1962; 1966; 1970; 1974; 1978; 1982; 1986; 1990; 1994; 1998; 2002; 2006; 2010; 2014; 2018; 2022; 2026

South Korea was the host nation of the 2014 Asian Games held in Incheon from 19 September to 4 October 2014. South Korea was represented by the Korean Olympic Committee, and the South Korean delegation was the largest in this edition of the Asian Games. The delegation of 1,068 people included 831 competitors (454 men, 377 women) and 237 officials.

Competitors from the South Korea led the bronze medal count with 84 in the general medal table. South Korea also won 79 gold medals, 70 silver medals and a total of 228 medals, finishing second on the medal table.

== Medal summary ==
=== Medal table ===
Sport	Gold	Silver	Bronze	Total
Shooting	8	11	8	27
Fencing	8	6	3	17
Bowling	7	1	6	14
Soft tennis	7	1	4	12
Taekwondo	6	2	2	10
Archery	5	3	1	9
Judo	5	2	8	15
Equestrian	4	1	1	6
Sailing	4	1	1	6
Cycling	3	4	1	8
Wrestling	3	3	6	12
Rowing	2	5	0	7
Boxing	2	3	1	6
Wushu	2	2	3	7
Basketball	2	0	0	2
Gymnastics	1	3	4	8
Golf	1	3	0	4
Badminton	1	2	2	5
Modern pentathlon	1	2	2	5
Canoeing	1	1	1	3
Handball	1	1	0	2
Field hockey	1	0	1	2
Football	1	0	1	2
Volleyball	1	0	1	2
Baseball	1	0	0	1
Tennis	1	0	0	1
Athletics	0	4	6	10
Sepaktakraw	0	4	0	0
Swimming	0	1	1	2
Diving	0	1	4	5
Table tennis	0	1	3	4
Weightlifting	0	1	1	2
Triathlon	0	1	0	1
Karate	0	0	4	4
Kabaddi	0	0	1	1
Rugby	0	0	1	1
Squash	0	0	1	1
Total	79	70	79	228

=== Medalists ===
==== Multiple Gold Medalists ====
Name	Sport	Gold	Silver	Bronze	Total
Lee Na-young	Bowling	4	1	1	6
Park Jong-woo	Bowling	3	0	1	4
Kim Ae-kyung	Soft tennis	3	0	1	4
Kim Beom-jun	Soft tennis	3	0	0	3
Kim Jun-hong	Shooting	2	2	0	4
Son Yun-hee	Bowling	2	1	1	4
Kim Dong-hoon	Soft tennis	2	0	1	3
Kim Cheong-yong	Shooting	2	0	0	2
Hwang Young-shik	Equestrian	2	0	0	2
Lee Ra-jin	Fencing	2	0	0	2
Jung Jin-sun	Fencing	2	0	0	2
Kim Jae-bum	Judo	2	0	0	2
Jeon Hee-sook	Fencing	2	0	0	2
Gu Bon-gil	Fencing	2	0	0	2
Song Sang-wuk	Equestrian	2	0	0	2
Choi Bo-min	Archery	2	0	0	2
Jung Dasomi	Archery	2	0	0	2
Kim Hyeong-jun	Soft tennis	2	0	0	2
Kim Bo-mi	Soft tennis	2	0	0	2
Joo Og	Soft tennis	2	0	0	2

==== Gold Medal ====
Medal	Name	Sport	Event	Date
Gold	Lee Ha-sung	Wushu	Men's Changquan	20 September
Gold	Chung Yoo-yeon, Kim Kyun-sub, Kim Dong-seon, Hwang Young-shik	Equestrian	Dressage Team	20 September
Gold	Kang Dong-jin, Im Chae-bin, Son Je-yong	Cycling	Men's Team Sprint	20 September
Gold	Lee Ra-jin	Fencing	Women's Individual Sabre	20 September
Gold	Jung Jin-sun	Fencing	Men's Individual Épée	20 September
Gold	Kim Cheong-yong, Jin Jong-oh, Lee Dae-myung	Shooting	Men's 10m Air Pistol Team	21 September
Gold	Kim Cheong-yong	Shooting	Men's 10m Air Pistol	21 September
Gold	Joung Da-woon	Judo	Women's −63kg	21 September
Gold	Kim Seong-yeon	Judo	Women's −70kg	21 September
Gold	Kim Jae-bum	Judo	Men's −81kg	21 September
Gold	Jeon Hee-sook	Fencing	Women's Individual Foil	21 September
Gold	Gu Bon-gil	Fencing	Men's Individual Sabre	21 September
Gold	Kim Jang-mi, Kwak Jung-hye, Lee Jung-eun	Shooting	Women's 25m Pistol Team	22 September
Gold	Jeong Gyeong-mi	Judo	Women's −78kg	22 September
Gold	Hwang Young-shik	Equestrian	Dressage Individual	23 September
Gold	Lee Ra-jin, Kim Ji-yeon, Yoon Ji-su, Hwang Seon-a	Fencing	Women's Team Sabre	23 September
Gold	Jung Jin-sun, Park Kyoung-doo, Park Sang-young, Kweon Young-jun	Fencing	Men's Team Épée	23 September
Gold	Choi Gwang-hyeon, Bang Gui-man, Kim Jae-bum, Lee Kyu-won, Kim Sung-min, Youn Tae-ho, Gwak Dong-han	Judo	Men's Team	23 September
Gold	Son Wan-ho, Yoo Yeon-seong, Lee Yong-dae, Lee Dong-keun, Kim Sa-rang, Kim Gi-jung, Lee Hyun-il, Ko Sung-hyun, Shin Baek-cheol, Jeon Hyeok-jin	Badminton	Men's Team	23 September
Gold	Eum Bit-na, Jeong Mi-ra, Na Yoon-kyung	Shooting	Women's 50m Rifle Prone Team	24 September
Gold	Kim Jun-hong, Song Jong-ho, Jang Dae-kyu	Shooting	Men's 25m Rapid Fire Pistol Team	24 September
Gold	Kim Jun-hong	Shooting	Men's 25m Rapid Fire Pistol	24 September
Gold	Kim Ye-ji	Rowing	Women's Single Sculls	24 September
Gold	Kim Myeong-jin	Wushu	Men's Sanda 75kg	24 September
Gold	Jeon Hee-sook, Nam Hyun-hee, Oh Ha-na, Kim Mi-na	Fencing	Women's Team Foil	24 September
Gold	Gu Bon-gil, Kim Jung-hwan, Won Woo-young, Oh Eun-seok	Fencing	Men's Team Sabre	24 September
Gold	Ji Yoo-jin	Rowing	Women's Lightweight Single Sculls	25 September
Gold	Kim Mi-jin	Shooting	Women's Double Trap	25 September
Gold	Song Sang-wuk, Bang Si-re, Hong Won-jae, Cheon Jai-sik	Equestrian	Eventing Team	26 September
Gold	Song Sang-wuk	Equestrian	Eventing Individual	26 September
Gold	Lee Na-young, Son Yun-hee	Bowling	Women's Doubles	26 September
Gold	Choi Bo-min, Kim Yun-hee, Seok Ji-hyun	Archery	Women's team compound	27 September
Gold	Choi Bo-min	Archery	Women's individual compound	27 September
Gold	Na Ah-reum	Cycling	Women's Individual Time Trial	27 September
Gold	Kim Min-ji	Shooting	Women's Skeet	27 September
Gold	Jung Dasomi, Chang Hye-jin, Lee Tuk-young	Archery	Women's team recurve	28 September
Gold	Lee Na-young, Son Yun-hee, Jung Da-wun	Bowling	Women's Trios	28 September
Gold	Jang Kyung-gu	Cycling	Men's Road Race	28 September
Gold	Jung Dasomi	Archery	Women's individual recurve	28 September
Gold	Oh Jin-hyek	Archery	Men's individual recurve	28 September
Gold	Park Gyeol	Golf	Women's Individual	28 September
Gold	Park Byung-ho, An Ji-man, Kim Min-sung, Lee Jae-hak, Lim Chang-yong, Hwang Jae-gyun, Kang Jung-ho, Oh Jae-won, Lee Jae-won, Yoo Won-sang, Lee Tae-yang, Cha Woo-chan, Na Ji-wan, Kim Kwang-hyun, Son Ah-seop, Hong Seong-moo, Kang Min-ho, Na Sung-bum, Min Byung-hun, Kim Hyun-soo, Bong Jung-keun, Kim Sang-su, Yang Hyeon-jong, Han Hyun-hee	Baseball	Men's Team	28 September
Gold	Cho Gwang-hee	Canoeing	Men's K-1 200m	29 September
Gold	Lim Yong-kyu, Chung Hyeon	Tennis	Men's Doubles	29 September
Gold	Lee Na-young	Bowling	Women's All Events	30 September
Gold	Kim Hyeong-jun	Soft tennis	Men's Singles	30 September
Gold	Kim Bo-mi	Soft tennis	Women's Singles	30 September
Gold	Park Sung-bin	Sailing	Men's Optimist	30 September
Gold	Ha Jee-min	Sailing	Men's Laser	30 September
Gold	Kim Chang-ju, Kim Ji-hoon	Sailing	Men's 470	30 September
Gold	Kim Keun-soo, Song Min-jae	Sailing	Open Hobie-16	30 September
Gold	Park Jong-woo, Choi Bok-eum, Kim Kyung-min, Kang Hee-won, Hong Hae-sol, Shin Seung-hyeon	Bowling	Men's Team of 5	30 September
Gold	Park Jong-woo	Bowling	Men's All Events	30 September
Gold	Jung Ji-hyun	Wrestling	Men's Greco-Roman 71kg	30 September
Gold	Kim Ae-kyung, Kim Beom-jun	Soft tennis	Mixed Doubles	1 October
Gold	Jo Chol-ho	Taekwondo	Men's +87kg	1 October
Gold	Kim So-hui	Taekwondo	Women's −46kg	1 October
Gold	Lee Ah-reum	Taekwondo	Women's −57kg	1 October
Gold	Ryu Han-su	Wrestling	Men's Greco-Roman 66kg	1 October
Gold	Kim Hyeon-woo	Wrestling	Men's Greco-Roman 75kg	1 October
Gold	Woo Sun-hee, Kim On-a, Ryu Eun-hee, Lee Eun-bi, Yoo Hyun-ji, Park Sae-young, Kim Seon-hwa, Jung Yu-ra, Won Seon-pil, Park Mi-ra, Kim Jin-yi, Choi Su-min, Gwon Han-na, Sim Hae-in, Jung Ji-hae, Song Mi-young	Handball	Women's Team	1 October
Gold	Kim Jong-eun, Kim Da-rae, Kim Hyun-ji, Lee Young-sil, An Hyo-ju, Heo Jae-seong, Cheon Eun-bi, Jang Soo-ji, Shin Hye-jeong, Kim Ok-ju, Park Mi-hyun, Park Ki-ju, Cho Eun-ji, Seo Jung-eun, Oh Sun-soon, Song Mi-young	Field hockey	Women's Team	1 October
Gold	Kim Beom-jun, Kim Dong-hoon	Soft tennis	Men's Doubles	2 October
Gold	Kim Ae-kyung, Joo Og	Soft tennis	Women's Doubles	2 October
Gold	Yang Soo-jin, Jeong Mi-na, Choi Min-ji, Kim Sun-woo	Modern pentathlon	Women's Team	2 October
Gold	Lee Dae-hoon	Taekwondo	Men's −63kg	2 October
Gold	Lee Da-bin	Taekwondo	Women's −62kg	2 October
Gold	Park Jong-woo	Bowling	Men's Masters	2 October
Gold	Lee Na-young	Bowling	Women's Masters	2 October
Gold	Son Yeon-jae	Gymnastics	Women's Rhythmic Individual All-Around	2 October
Gold	Lee Mi-sun, Beon Yeon-ha, Sin Jung-ja, Ha Eun-joo, Kim Dan-bi, Lee Kyung-eun, Park Hye-jin, Lim Yung-hui, Yang Ji-hee, Kwak Joo-yeong, Kim Jung-eun, Kang Young-suk	Basketball	Women's Team	2 October
Gold	Kim Yeon-koung, Park Jeong-ah, Kim Hee-jin, Kim Hae-ran, Han Song-yi, Lee Da-yeong, Yang Hyo-jin, Lee Hyo-hee, Baek Mok-hwa, Lee Jae-yeong, Nam Jie-youn, Bae Yoo-na	Volleyball	Women's Team	2 October
Gold	Jang Hyun-soo, Kim Seung-gyu, Kim Jin-su, Kim Min-hyeok, Son Jun-ho, Park Joo-ho, Lee Yong-jae, Kim Seung-dae, Rim Chang-woo, Lee Jong-ho, Lee Jae-sung, Choi Sung-guen, Lee Joo-young, An Yong-woo, Yun Il-lok, No Dong-geon, Kwak Hae-seong, Kim Young-uk, Kim Shin-wook, Moon Sang-yun	Football	Men's Team	2 October
Gold	Kim Tae-hun	Taekwondo	Men's −54kg	3 October
Gold	Shin Jong-hun	Boxing	Men's Light Fly	3 October
Gold	Ham Sang-myeong	Boxing	Men's Bantam	3 October
Gold	Yang Dong-geun, Moon Tae-jong, Park Chan-hee, Kim Tae-sul, Lee Jong-hyun, Kim Sun-hyung, Cho Sung-min, Yang Hee-jong, Kim Joo-sung, Heo Il-young, Oh Se-keun, Kim Jong-kyu	Basketball	Men's Team	3 October
Gold	Kim Beom-jun, Kim Dong-hoon, Kim Hyeong-jun, Park Kyu-cheol, Lee Sang-gwon	Soft tennis	Men's Team	4 October
Gold	Kim Ae-kyung, Joo Og, Kim Ji-yeon, Kim Bo-mi, Yoon Soo-jung	Soft tennis	Women's Team	4 October

==== Silver Medal ====
Medal	Name	Sport	Event	Date
Silver	Jin Jong-oh, Choi Young-rae, Lee Dae-myung	Shooting	Men's 50m Pistol Team	20 September
Silver	Jung Jee-Hae	Shooting	Women's 10m Air Pistol	20 September
Silver	Kim Won-gyeong, Lee Hye-jin	Cycling	Women's Team Sprint	20 September
Silver	Kim Ji-yeon	Fencing	Women's individual Sabre	20 September
Silver	Park Kyoung-doo	Fencing	Men's Individual Épée	20 September
Silver	Lee Yong-hyun	Wushu	Men's Daoshu / Gunshu	21 September
Silver	Im Jae-yeon, Park Sang-hoon, Park Seon-ho, Park Keon-woo	Cycling	Men's Team Pursuit	21 September
Silver	Kim Hee-hoon, Shin Dong-hyen, Park Min-soo, Yang Hak-seon, Lee Sang-wook, Lee Hyeok-jung	Gymnastics	Men's Artistic Team	21 September
Silver	Kim Jan-di	Judo	Women's −57kg	21 September
Silver	Kim Jung-hwan	Fencing	Men's Individual Sabre	21 September
Silver	Kim Young-man, Im An-soo, Jeong Won-deok	Sepaktakraw	Men's Double Regu	22 September
Silver	Son Hee-jung, Kim You-ri, Lee Ju-mi, Na Ah-reum	Cycling	Women's Team Pursuit	22 September
Silver	Shin A-lam	Fencing	Women's Individual Épée	22 September
Silver	Heo Jun	Fencing	Men's Individual Foil	22 September
Silver	Sung Ji-hyun, Kim So-yeong, Chang Ye-Na, Bae Youn-joo, Kim Ha-na, Jung Kyung-eun, Koh Eun-byeol, Yoo Hae-won, Go Ah-ra, Kim Hyo-min	Badminton	Women's Team	22 September
Silver	Kim Sang-do, Kim Hyeon-jun, Han Jin-seop	Shooting	Men's 10m Air Rifle Team	23 September
Silver	Kim Dong-seon	Equestrian	Dressage Individual	23 September
Silver	Cho Ho-sung	Cycling	Men's Omnium	23 September
Silver	Jung Eun-jung, Kim Jan-di, Bak Ji-yun, Kim Seong-yeon, Lee Jung-eun, Joung Da-woon	Judo	Women's Team	23 September
Silver	Jeon Seo-yeong, Kim Seo-hee	Rowing	Women's Coxless Pair	24 September
Silver	Lee Hak-beom	Rowing	Men's Lightweight Single Sculls	24 September
Silver	Kim In-won, Kim Hwi-gwan, Lee Seon-soo, Choi Do-sub	Rowing	Men's Quadruple Sculls	24 September
Silver	Yoo Sang-hoon	Wushu	Men's Sanda 70kg	24 September
Silver	Kwon Jun-cheol, Park Bong-duk, You Jae-jin	Shooting	Men's 50m Rifle Prone Team	25 September
Silver	Kim Jun-hong, Kang Min-su, Jang Dae-kyu	Shooting	Men's 25m Standard Pistol Team	25 September
Silver	Kim Jun-hong	Shooting	Men's 25m Standard Pistol	25 September
Silver	Kim Dong-yong	Rowing	Men's Single Sculls	25 September
Silver	Kim Seul-gi, Ma Se-rom, Jeon Seo-yeong, Kim A-rum	Rowing	Women's Quadruple Sculls	25 September
Silver	Kim Mi-jin, Son Hye-kyoung, Lee Bo-na	Shooting	Women's Double Trap Team	25 September
Silver	Choi In-jeong, Shin A-lam, Kim Myoung-sun, Choi Eun-sook	Fencing	Women's Team Épée	25 September
Silver	Park Tae-hwan	Swimming	Men's 100m Freestyle	25 September
Silver	Yang Hak-seon	Gymnastics	Men's Vault	25 September
Silver	Lee Da-lin, Yang Ji-won, An Se-hyeon, Ko Mi-so	Swimming	Women's 4 × 100 m Medley Relay	25 September
Silver	Jeong Mi-ra, Yoo Seo-young, Kim Seol-a	Shooting	Women's 50m Rifle 3 Positions Team	26 September
Silver	Jeong Mi-ra	Shooting	Women's 50m Rifle 3 Positions	26 September
Silver	Kim Min-jae	Weightlifting	Men's 105kg	26 September
Silver	Jeong Hye-rim, Heo Min-ho, Kim Gyu-ri, Kim Ji-hwan	Triathlon	Mixed team Relay	26 September
Silver	Choi Yong-hee, Min Li-hong, Yang Young-ho	Archery	Men's team compound	27 September
Silver	Seok Ji-hyun	Archery	Women's individual compound	27 September
Silver	Kim Jong-hyun, Han Jin-seop, Kwon Jun-cheol	Shooting	Men's 50m Rifle 3 Positions Team	27 September
Silver	Kim Min-ji, Kwak Yu-hyun, Son Hye-kyoung	Shooting	Women's Skeet Team	27 September
Silver	Oh Man-ho	Wrestling	Men's Freestyle 70kg	27 September
Silver	Go Jae-uk, Hong Seung-hyun, Im An-soo, Jeon Young-man, Jeong Won-deok, Kim Hyun-jun, Kim Young-man, Park Hyeong-eun, Shim Jae-chul, Shin Choo-kwang, Sin Seung-tae, Woo Gyeong-han	Sepaktakraw	Men's Team	28 September
Silver	Chang Hye-jin	Archery	Women's individual recurve	28 September
Silver	Park Gyeol, Choi Hye-jin, Lee So-young	Golf	Women's Team	28 September
Silver	Kim Nam-hun	Golf	Men's Individual	28 September
Silver	Kim Nam-hun, Youm Eun-ho, Kong Tae-hyun, Kim Young-woong	Golf	Men's Team	28 September
Silver	Yoo Yeon-seong, Lee Yong-dae	Badminton	Men's Doubles	28 September
Silver	Lee Sun-ja, Lee Min, Lee Hye-ran, Kim You-jin	Canoeing	Women's K-4 500m	29 September
Silver	Kim Yeong-nam, Woo Ha-ram	Diving	Men's Synchronised 10m Platform	29 September
Silver	Lee Na-young, Son Yun-hee, Jung Da-wun, Kim Jin-sun, Lee Yeong-seung, Jeon Eun-hee	Bowling	Women's Team of 5	30 September
Silver	Yoon Jeong-yeon	Taekwondo	Women's −53kg	30 September
Silver	Jeong Sang-eun, Joo Se-hyuk, Kim Dong-hyun, Kim Min-seok, Lee Jung-woo	Table tennis	Men's Team	30 September
Silver	Kim Byoung-jun	Athletics	Men's 110m Hurdles	30 September
Silver	Kim Deok-hyeon	Athletics	Men's Long Jump	30 September
Silver	Park Chil-sung	Athletics	Men's 50km Race Walk	1 October
Silver	Park Gun-woo, Chae Bong-jin, Cho Sung-min, Kim Sung-wok, Yang Ho-yeob	Sailing	Open Match Racing	1 October
Silver	Park Ji-na	Boxing	Women's Light	1 October
Silver	Lee Se-yeol	Wrestling	Men's Greco-Roman 85kg	1 October
Silver	Kim Yong-min	Wrestling	Men's Greco-Roman 130kg	1 October
Silver	Son Yeon-jae, Gim Yun-hee, Lee Da-ae, Lee Na-kyung	Gymnastics	Women's Rhythmic Team	1 October
Silver	Kim Ji-yeon, Yoon Soo-jung	Soft tennis	Women's Doubles	2 October
Silver	Yang Soo-jin	Modern pentathlon	Women's Individual	2 October
Silver	Lee Won-jin	Taekwondo	Women's −67kg	2 October
Silver	Park Se-jung, Park Bong-go, Seong Hyeok-je, Yeo Hosua, Choi Dong-baek	Athletics	Men's 4 × 400 m Relay	2 October
Silver	Park Jung-geu, Jeong Yi-kyeong, Sim Jae-bok, Park Kyung-suk, Yu Dong-geun, Jung Su-young, Lee Sang-uk, Lim Duk-jun, Oh Yun-suk, Lee Dong-myung, Hwang Do-yeop, Yoon Ci-yoel, Lee Hyeon-sik, Lee Eun-ho, Eom Hyo-won, Lee Chang-woo	Handball	Men's Team	2 October
Silver	Jung Jin-hwa	Modern pentathlon	Men's Individual	3 October
Silver	Kim Young-man, Im An-soo, Jeong Won-deok, Park Hyeong-eun, Shim Jae-chul	Sepaktakraw	Men's Regu	3 October
Silver	Kim I-seul, Lee Jin-hee, Lee Min-ju, Park Seon-ju, Sim Su-yeon	Sepaktakraw	Women's Regu	3 October
Silver	Lim Hyun-chul	Boxing	Men's Light Welter	3 October
Silver	Kim Hyeong-kyu	Boxing	Men's Light Heavy	3 October

==== Bronze Medal ====
Medal	Name	Sport	Event	Date
Bronze	Kim Won-jin	Judo	Men's −60kg	20 September
Bronze	Jung Bo-kyung	Judo	Women's −48kg	20 September
Bronze	Jung Eun-jung	Judo	Women's −52kg	20 September
Bronze	Jin Jong-oh	Shooting	Men's 10m Air Pistol	21 September
Bronze	Jung Chang-hee, Lee Young-sik, Shin Hyun-woo	Shooting	Men's Trap team	21 September
Bronze	Seo Hee-ju	Wushu	Women's Jianshu / Qiangshu	21 September
Bronze	Bang Gui-man	Judo	Men's −73kg	21 September
Bronze	Park Tae-hwan	Swimming	Men's 200m Freestyle	21 September
Bronze	Nam Hyun-hee	Fencing	Women's Individual Foil	21 September
Bronze	Kim Seol-a, Kim Gae-nam, Jeong Mi-ra	Shooting	Women's 10m Air Rifle Team	22 September
Bronze	Gwak Dong-han	Judo	Men's −90kg	22 September
Bronze	Cho Gu-ham	Judo	Men's −100kg	22 September
Bronze	Kim Sung-min	Judo	Men's +100kg	22 September
Bronze	Kim Eun-kyeong	Judo	Women's +78kg	22 September
Bronze	Choi In-jeong	Fencing	Women's Individual Épée	22 September
Bronze	Nam Ki-woong, Yang June-hyuck, Jeong Jeong-soo, Park Tae-hwan	Swimming	Men's 4 × 200 m Freestyle Relay	22 September
Bronze	Lee Sang-wook	Gymnastics	Men's Individual All-Around	23 September
Bronze	Yun Na-rae	Gymnastics	Women's Individual All-Around	23 September
Bronze	Kang Yeong-sik	Wushu	Men's Sanda 60kg	23 September
Bronze	Kim hye-bin	Wushu	Women's Sanda 52kg	23 September
Bronze	Park Tae-hwan	Swimming	Men's 400m Freestyle	23 September
Bronze	Eum Bit-na	Shooting	Women's 50m Rifle Prone	24 September
Bronze	Lee Na-young	Bowling	Women's Singles	24 September
Bronze	Park Min-soo	Gymnastics	Men's Pommel Horse	24 September
Bronze	Kim Sung-kyum, Yang June-hyuck, Nam Ki-woong, Park Tae-hwan, Park Seon-kwan	Swimming	Men's 4 × 100 m Freestyle Relay	24 September
Bronze	Park Bong-duk	Shooting	Men's 50m Rifle Prone	25 September
Bronze	Heo Jun, Son Young-ki, Kim Min-kyu, Kim Hyo-gon	Fencing	Men's Team Foil	25 September
Bronze	Na Ah-reum	Cycling	Women's Omnium	25 September
Bronze	Yang Jung-doo	Swimming	Men's 50m Butterfly	25 September
Bronze	Lee Chang-ho	Weightlifting	Men's 94kg	25 September
Bronze	Yun Na-rae	Gymnastics	Women's Floor	25 September
Bronze	Kim Young-min, Jang Dae-kyu, Kim Jin-il	Shooting	Men's 25m Center Fire Pistol Team	26 September
Bronze	Bang Si-re	Equestrian	Eventing Individual	26 September
Bronze	Park Eun-ok, Song Sun-mi, Yang Yeon-soo, Lee Ji-hyun	Squash	Women's Team	26 September
Bronze	Lee Yeong-seung, Jung Da-wun	Bowling	Women's Doubles	26 September
Bronze	Park Seon-kwan, Choi Kyu-woong, Chang Gyu-cheol, Park Tae-hwan, Im Tae-jeong, Ju Jang-hun, Yun Seok-hwan, Kim Sung-kyum	Swimming	Men's 4 × 100 m Medley Relay	26 September
Bronze	Jeong You-jin	Shooting	Men's 10m Running Target Mixed	27 September
Bronze	Bae Youn-joo	Badminton	Women's Singles	27 September
Bronze	Kim Ki-jung, Kim Sa-rang	Badminton	Men's Doubles	27 September
Bronze	Yun Jun-sik	Wrestling	Men's Freestyle 57kg	27 September
Bronze	Kim Hyun-sub	Athletics	Men's 20km Race Walk	28 September
Bronze	Oh Jin-hyek, Lee Seung-yun, Ku Bon-chan	Archery	Men's team recurve	28 September
Bronze	Lee Yeong-seung, Jeon Eun-hee, Kim Jin-sun	Bowling	Women's Trios	28 September
Bronze	Jeon Yeong-eun	Athletics	Women's 20km Race Walk	28 September
Bronze	Choi Bok-eum, Park Jong-woo, Kim Kyung-min	Bowling	Men's Trios	28 September
Bronze	Hwang Eun-ju	Wrestling	Women's Freestyle 75kg	28 September
Bronze	Jin Min-sub	Athletics	Men's Pole Vault	28 September
Bronze	Lee Sun-ja	Canoeing	Women's K-1 500m	29 September
Bronze	Lee Seung-chul	Wrestling	Men's Freestyle 61kg	29 September
Bronze	Lee Sang-kyu	Wrestling	Men's Freestyle 74kg	29 September
Bronze	Kim Gwan-uk	Wrestling	Men's Freestyle 86kg	29 September
Bronze	Nam Koung-jin	Wrestling	Men's Freestyle 125kg	29 September
Bronze	Kim Dong-hoon	Soft tennis	Men's Singles	30 September
Bronze	Kim Ae-kyung	Soft tennis	Women's Singles	30 September
Bronze	Kim Yeong-nam, Woo Ha-ram	Diving	Men's Synchronised 3m Springboard	30 September
Bronze	Song Young-geon	Taekwondo	Men's −74kg	30 September
Bronze	Shin Yeong-rae	Taekwondo	Men's −87kg	30 September
Bronze	Lee Na-kyung, Choi Seo-eun	Sailing	Women's 420	30 September
Bronze	Lim Eun-ji	Athletics	Women's Pole Vault	30 September
Bronze	Kang Hee-won	Bowling	Men's All Events	30 September
Bronze	Hwang Jung-soo, Cho Min-ki, Lee Jong-jun	Shooting	Men's Skeet Team	30 September
Bronze	Kim Na-mi	Diving	Women's 1m Springboard	1 October
Bronze	Woo Ha-ram	Diving	Men's 1m Springboard	1 October
Bronze	Kim Ji-yeon, Park Kyu-cheol	Soft tennis	Mixed Doubles	1 October
Bronze	Cho So-hyun, Jung Seol-bin, Jeon Ga-eul, Yoo Young-a, Ji So-yun, Jun Min-kyung, Song Su-ran, Kim Hye-ri, Shim Seo-yeon, Kim Do-yeon, Lim Seon-joo, Choe Yu-ri, Park Hee-young, Kwon Hah-nul, Lee So-dam, Lee Young-ju, Shin Da-myeong, Kim Jung-mi	Football	Women's Team	1 October
Bronze	Yeo Hosua	Athletics	Men's 200m	1 October
Bronze	Eom Tae-deok, Ahn Hwan-gi, Heo Youn-chan, Hong Dong-ju, Jung Kwang-soo, Kim Gyung-tae, Kim Ki-dong, Kim Seong-ryeol, Lee Jang-kun, Park Hyun-il, Seo Dea-ho, Yook Sang-min	Kabaddi	Men's Team	2 October
Bronze	Lee Sang-gwon, Park Kyu-cheol	Soft tennis	Men's Doubles	2 October
Bronze	Choi Min-ji	Modern pentathlon	Women's Individual	2 October
Bronze	Kim Do-won	Karate	Men's −67kg	2 October
Bronze	Son Yun-hee	Bowling	Women's Masters	2 October
Bronze	Kim Deok-hyeon	Athletics	Men's Triple Jump	2 October
Bronze	Lee Myung-ho, Oh Dae-keun, Lee Nam-yong, Kang Moon-kweon, Lee Seung-il, Yoon Sung-hoon, You Hyo-sik, Jung Man-jae, Kang Moon-kyu, Hyun Hye-sung, Hong Eun-seong, Kim Young-jin, Lee Seung-hoon, Kim Seong-kyu, Jang Jong-hyun, Nam Hyun-woo	Field hockey	Men's Team	2 October
Bronze	Han Kun-kyu, Yoon Tae-il, Kim Jeong-min, Yang Young-hun, Oh Youn-hyung, Kim Sung-soo, Kim Gwong-min, Kim Hyun-soo, Park Wan-yong, Kim Nam-uk, Jeong Yeon-sik, Lee Yong-seung	Rugby	Men's Team	2 October
Bronze	Park Nam-hyeong	Boxing	Men's Heavy	2 October
Bronze	Jeon Ji-hee, Kim Min-seok	Table tennis	Mixed Doubles	2 October
Bronze	Jung Jin-hwa, Lee Woo-jin, Hwang Woo-jin, Jung Hwon-ho	Modern pentathlon	Men's Team	3 October
Bronze	Woo Ha-ram	Diving	Men's 10m Platform	3 October
Bronze	Lee Ji-hwan	Karate	Men's −60kg	3 October
Bronze	Han Sun-soo, Song Myung-geun, Shin Yung-suk, Lee Min-gyu, Park Sang-ha, Kwak Seung-suk, Bu Yong-chan, Choi Min-ho, Jeon Kwang-in, Park Chul-woo, Seo Jae-duck, Jeong Min-su	Volleyball	Men's Team	3 October
Bronze	Joo Sae-hyuk	Table tennis	Men's Singles	4 October
Bronze	Yang Ha-eun	Table tennis	Women's Singles	4 October
Bronze	Jang Min-soo	Karate	Men's −84kg	4 October
Bronze	Jang So-young	Karate	Women's −50kg	4 October

== Archery ==
=== Recurve ===
==== Men ====
Athlete	Event	Qualification Round		Round of 64	Round of 32	Round of 16	Quarterfinals	Semifinals	Final
Athlete	Event	Score	Seed	Opposition Score	Opposition Score	Opposition Score	Opposition Score	Opposition Score	Opposition Score
Lee Seung-yun	Individual	1377	1st Q	BYE	S. Albawardi (KSA); W 6–0 (30–24, 29–27, 28–23)	Yong Zhiwei (CHN); L 5–6 (26–28, 27–26, 27–27, 28–29, 28–27, 9–9*)	did not advance		
Oh Jin-hyek	Individual	1362	2nd Q	BYE	M. Jasim (IRQ); W 6–0 (27–25, 28–24, 30–24)	Denis Gankin (KAZ); W 6–2 (29–30, 29–27, 28–27, 29–27)	Atanu Das (IND); W 6–0 (29–28, 29–25, 29–28)	Kuo Cheng Wei (TPE); W 6–0 (29–27, 29–27, 30–26)	Yong Zhiwei (CHN); W 6–4 (27–29, 27–30, 30–27, 28–27, 27–26) (gold)
Ku Bon-chan	Individual	1362	3rd	did not advance					
Kim Woo-jin	Individual	1354	4th	did not advance					
Lee Seung-yun; Oh Jin-hyek; Ku Bon-chan	Team	4101	1st Q	—N/a		Kazakhstan (KAZ); W 6–0 (56–52, 57–44, 57–52)	Mongolia (MGL); W 6–0 (57–49, 56–49, 55–52)	China (CHN); L 4–5 (56–53, 55–58, 59–57, 58–59, 28–28*)	Bronze medal match Japan (JPN); W 5–3 (57–56, 56–56, 56–58, 57–55) (bronze)

==== Women ====
Athlete	Event	Qualification Round		Round of 32	Round of 16	Quarterfinals	Semifinals	Final
Athlete	Event	Score	Seed	Opposition Score	Opposition Score	Opposition Score	Opposition Score	Opposition Score
Jung Dasomi	Individual	1364	1st Q	BYE	Loc Thi Dao (VIE); W 6–2 (24–26, 28–23, 29–27, 28–27)	Kaori Kawanaka (JPN); W 6–4 (27–28, 29–28, 30–30, 29–29, 30–27)	Ren Hayakawa (JPN); W 7–3 (28–27, 29–30, 30–28, 28–28, 29–26)	Chang Hye-jin (KOR); W 7–1 (30–28, 29–29, 29–28, 30–28) (gold)
Chang Hye-jin	Individual	1359	2nd Q	Choki Wangmo (BHU); W 6–0 (28–25, 28–20, 25–24)	Luiza Saidiyeva (KAZ); W 7–1 (29–24, 28–24, 23–23, 28–27)	Laxmirani Majhi (IND); W 6–2 (27–25, 27–28, 28–27, 29–28)	Xu Jing (CHN); W 6–2 (28–28, 29–29, 29–27, 29–28)	Jung Dasomi (KOR); L 1–7 (28–30, 29–29, 28–29, 28–30) (silver)
Lee Tuk-young	Individual	1358	3rd	did not advance				
Joo Hyun-jung	Individual	1324	13th	did not advance				
Jung Dasomi; Chang Hye-jin; Lee Tuk-young	Team	4081	1st Q	—N/a	BYE	Kazakhstan (KAZ); W 5–1 (52–51, 54–54, 51–49)	India (IND); W 6–0 (56–50, 58–54, 56–54)	China (CHN); W 6–0 (54–51, 56–55, 58–52) (gold)

=== Compound ===
==== Men ====
Athlete	Event	Qualification Round		Round of 64	Round of 32	Round of 16	Quarterfinals	Semifinals	Final
Athlete	Event	Score	Seed	Opposition Score	Opposition Score	Opposition Score	Opposition Score	Opposition Score	Opposition Score
Choi Yong-hee	Individual	706	2nd Q	BYE	Muslim Ebrahim (KUW); W 145–134	Sapriatno (INA); W 146–140	Abhishek Verma (IND); L 142–147	did not advance	
Yang Young-ho	Individual	701	5th	did not advance					
Kim Jong-ho	Individual	699	7th	did not advance					
Min Li-hong	Individual	695	12th Q	BYE	T. Siriphonh (LAO); W 143–135	Pavel Fisher (KAZ); W 142–137	Esmaeil Ebadi (IRI); L 145–149	did not advance	
Choi Yong-hee; Yang Young-ho; Min Li-hong	Team	2106	1st Q	—N/a		BYE	Kazakhstan; W 238–231	Philippines; W 228–227	India; L 224–227 (silver)

==== Women ====
Athlete	Event	Qualification Round		Round of 32	Round of 16	Quarterfinals	Semifinals	Final
Athlete	Event	Score	Seed	Opposition Score	Opposition Score	Opposition Score	Opposition Score	Opposition Score
Choi Bo-min	Individual	695	1st Q	BYE	V. Polonskaya (KAZ); W 138–124	Sri Ranti (INA); W 142–140	Huang I Jou (TPE); W 145–139	Seok Ji-hyun (KOR); W 144–143 (gold)
Seok Ji-hyun	Individual	695	2nd Q	BYE	Aye Aye Thin (MYA); W 144–136	P. Shende (IND); W 143–140	Trisha Deb (IND); W 145–140	Choi Bo-min (KOR); L 143–144 (silver)
Kim Yun-hee	Individual	692	3rd	did not advance				
Youn So-jung	Individual	658	32nd	did not advance				
Choi Bo-min; Seok Ji-hyun; Kim Yun-hee	Team	2082	1st Q	—N/a	BYE	Laos; W 238^{WR}-215	Iran; W 229–222	Chinese Taipei; W 229–226 (gold)

== Badminton ==
=== Men ===
Athlete	Event	Round of 64	Round of 32	Round of 16	Quarter Final	Semi Final	Final	Rank
Athlete	Event	Opposition Result	Opposition Result	Opposition Result	Opposition Result	Opposition Result	Opposition Result	Rank
Lee Dong-keun	Singles	Lou Hok Man (MAC); W 2–0; 21–8, 21–5	Lin Dan (CHN); L 0–2; 12–21, 26–28	Did Not Advance				
Son Wan-ho	Singles	Bye	Soroush Eskandari (IRI); W' 2–0; 21–8, 21–10	Srikanth Kidambi (IND); W 2–1; 19–21, 11–21, 18–21	Chen Long (CHN); L 0–2; 16–21, 19–21	Did Not Advance		

Athlete	Event	Round of 32	Round of 16	Quarter Final	Semi Final	Final	Rank
Athlete	Event	Opposition Result	Opposition Result	Opposition Result	Opposition Result	Opposition Result	Rank
Lee Yong-dae; Yoo Yeon-seong	Doubles	Bye	Chan Yun Lung (HKG); Law Cheuk Him (HKG); W 2–0; 21–17, 21–18	Angga Pratama (INA); Rian Agung Saputro (INA); W 2–0; 21–16, 21–11	Goh V Shem (MAS); Tan Wee Kiong (MAS); W 2–0; 21–6, 21–15	Mohammad Ahsan (INA); Hendra Setiawan (INA); L 1–2; 16–21, 21–16, 17–21	2nd place, silver medalist(s)
Kim Gi-jung; Kim Sa-rang	Doubles	Bye	Danny Bawa Chrisnanta (SIN); Chayut Triyachart (SIN); W 2–0; 21–14, 21–15	Takeshi Kamura (JPN); Keigo Sonoda (JPN); W 2–0; 21–15, 21–15	Mohammad Ahsan (INA); Hendra Setiawan (INA); L 1–2; 21–19, 16–21, 18–21	Did Not Advance	3rd place, bronze medalist(s)

Athlete	event	Round of 16	Quarterfinals	Semifinals	Final	Rank
Athlete	event	Opposition Result	Opposition Result	Opposition Result	Opposition Result	Rank
Jeon Hyeok-jin; Kim Gi-jung; Kim Sa-rang; Ko Sung-hyun; Lee Dong-keun; Lee Hyun-il; Lee Yong-dae; Shin Baek-cheol; Son Wan-ho; Yoo Yeon-seong	Team	(India); India; W 3–0	(Japan); Japan; W 3–2	(Chinese Taipei); Chinese Taipei; W 3–0	(China); China; W 3–2	1st place, gold medalist(s)

=== Women ===
Athlete	Event	Round of 32	Round of 16	Quarter Final	Semi Final	Final	Rank
Athlete	Event	Opposition Result	Opposition Result	Opposition Result	Opposition Result	Opposition Result	Rank
Sung Ji-hyun	Singles	Lê Thu Huyền (VIE); W 2–0; 21–12, 21–12	Yang Li Lian (MAS); W 2–0; 21–16, 21–13	Tai Tzu-ying (TPE); L 1–2; 14–21, 21–9, 17–21	Did Not Advance		
Bae Yeon-ju	Singles	Cheung Ngan Yi (HKG); W' 2–0; 21–19, 21–12	Akane Yamaguchi (JPN); W' 2–1; 18–21, 21–18, 21–15	Ratchanok Intanon (THA); W 2–1; 21–4, 18–21, 21–8	Wang Yihan (CHN); L 1–2; 10–21, 21–12, 16–21	Did Not Advance	3rd place, bronze medalist(s)

Athlete	Event	Round of 32	Round of 16	Quarter Final	Semi Final	Final	Rank
Athlete	Event	Opposition Result	Opposition Result	Opposition Result	Opposition Result	Opposition Result	Rank
Chang Ye-na; Kim So-young	Doubles	Bye	Wang Rong (MAC); Zhang Zhibo (MAC); L 0–2; 17–21, 18–21	Did Not Advance			
Jung Kyung-eun; Kim Ha-na	Doubles	Bye	Puttita Supajirakul (THA); Sapsiree Taerattanachai (THA); W 2–0; 21–17, 21–19	Tian Qing (CHN); Zhao Yunlei (CHN); L 1–2; 13–21, 21–19, 19–21	Did Not Advance		

Athlete	event	Round of 16	Quarterfinals	Semifinals	Final	Rank
Athlete	event	Opposition Result	Opposition Result	Opposition Result	Opposition Result	Rank
Bae Yeon-ju; Chang Ye-na; Go Ah-ra; Jung Kyung-eun; Kim Ha-na; Kim Hyo-min; Kim So-young; Ko Eun-byul; Sung Ji-hyun; Yoo Hae-won	Team	Bye	(Chinese Taipei); Chinese Taipei; W 3–0	(India); India; W 3–1	(China); China; W 3–0	2nd place, silver medalist(s)

=== Mixed ===
Athlete	Event	Round of 32	Round of 16	Quarter Final	Semi Final	Final	Rank
Athlete	Event	Opposition Result	Opposition Result	Opposition Result	Opposition Result	Opposition Result	Rank
Ko Sung-hyun; Kim Ha-na	Mixed doubles	Wan Wai Chi (MAC); Wong Kit Ieng (MAC); W 2–0; 21–6, 21–6	Chayut Triyachart (SIN); Yao Lei (SIN); W 2–0; 21–13, 21–15	Praveen Jordan (INA); Debby Susanto (INA); L 1–2; 9–21, 21–9, 15–21	Did Not Advence		
Shin Baek-cheol; Chang Ye-na	Mixed doubles	Wong Chi Chong (MAC); Ieong Pek San (MAC); W 2–0; 21–2, 21–11	Maneepong Jongjit (THA); Sapsiree Taerattanachai (THA); W 2–1; 16–21, 21–11, 21–18	Tontowi Ahmad (INA); Liliyana Natsir (INA); L 1–2; 21–19, 16–21, 9–21	Did Not Advence		

== Baseball ==
=== Men ===
Preliminary round

Group B

Team	Pld	W	L	RF	RA	Pct
South Korea	3	3	0	37	0	1.000
Chinese Taipei	3	2	1	25	11	0.667
Thailand	3	1	2	14	35	0.333
Hong Kong	3	0	3	7	37	0.000

22 September; 18:30	Thailand	0–15 (F/5)	South Korea	Munhak Baseball Stadium, Incheon; Umpires: Ito Akihiko (JPN)
22 September; 18:30	LP: Sihamat Wissaroot	Boxscore	WP: Yoo Won-sang	Munhak Baseball Stadium, Incheon; Umpires: Ito Akihiko (JPN)

Team	1	2	3	4	5	6	7	8	9	R	H	E
Thailand	0	0	0	0	0	-	-	-	-	0	2	2
South Korea	8	0	4	3	X	-	-	-	-	15	13	0

24 September; 18:30	Chinese Taipei	0–10 (F/8)	South Korea	Munhak Baseball Stadium; Umpires: Horii Akira (JPN)
24 September; 18:30	LP: Wang Yao Lin	Boxscore	WP: Cha Woo-chan	Munhak Baseball Stadium; Umpires: Horii Akira (JPN)
24 September; 18:30		Boxscore	HR: Kang Jung-ho (1), Oh Jae-won (1), Park Byung-ho (1)	Munhak Baseball Stadium; Umpires: Horii Akira (JPN)

Team	1	2	3	4	5	6	7	8	9	R	H	E
Chinese Taipei	0	0	0	0	0	0	0	0	-	0	6	1
South Korea	7	2	0	0	0	0	0	1	-	10	14	0

25 September; 18:30	South Korea	12–0 (F/7)	Hong Kong	Mokdong Baseball Stadium; Umpires: Feng Qifeng(CHN)
25 September; 18:30	WP: Bong Jung-keun	Boxscore	LP: Leung Ka Ho Sam	Mokdong Baseball Stadium; Umpires: Feng Qifeng(CHN)
25 September; 18:30	HR: Min Byung-hun (1)	Boxscore		Mokdong Baseball Stadium; Umpires: Feng Qifeng(CHN)

Team	1	2	3	4	5	6	7	8	9	R	H	E
South Korea	1	1	3	1	1	2	3	-	-	12	9	1
Hong Kong	0	0	0	0	0	0	0	-	-	0	2	1

Semifinals

27 September; 18:30	China	2–7	South Korea	Mokdong Baseball Stadium; Umpires: Sakumoto Akira(JPN)
27 September; 18:30	LP: Qi Jiping	Boxscore	WP: Lee Tae-yang	Mokdong Baseball Stadium; Umpires: Sakumoto Akira(JPN)
27 September; 18:30		Boxscore	HR: Kang Jung-ho (1), Park Byung-ho (1)	Mokdong Baseball Stadium; Umpires: Sakumoto Akira(JPN)

Team	1	2	3	4	5	6	7	8	9	R	H	E
China	0	0	1	1	0	0	0	0	0	2	5	2
South Korea	0	1	1	0	2	3	0	0	X	7	13	1

finals

28 September; 18:30	South Korea	6–3	Chinese Taipei	Munhak Baseball Stadium; Umpires: Horii Akira (JPN)
28 September; 18:30	WP: An Ji-man	Boxscore	LP: Chen Kuan Yu	Munhak Baseball Stadium; Umpires: Horii Akira (JPN)

Team	1	2	3	4	5	6	7	8	9	R	H	E
South Korea	0	0	0	0	2	0	0	4	0	6	8	0
Chinese Taipei	1	0	0	0	0	2	0	0	0	3	7	1

== Fencing ==
=== Men ===
Event	Athlete	Round of Poules		Round of 32	Round of 16	Quarterfinals	Semifinals	Final
Event	Athlete	Result	Seed	Opposition Score	Opposition Score	Opposition Score	Opposition Score	Opposition Score
Jung Jin-sun	Individual épée	6 W – 0 L	Q	BYE	A. Abdullah (KSA); W 15–7	Minobe Kazuyasu (JPN); W 15–11	Lim Wei Wen (SIN); W 15–5	Park Kyoung-doo (KOR); W 15–9 (gold)
Park Kyoung-doo	Individual épée	5 W – 1 L	Q	B. Batkhuu (MGL); W 15–6	Dong Chao (CHN); W 11–8	Petrov Roman (KGZ); W 15–10	Nguyen Tien Nhat (VIE); W 11–8	Jung Jin-sun (KOR); L 9–15 (silver)
Jung Jin-sun; Park Kyoung-doo; Park Sang-young; Kweon Young-jun	Team épée	—N/a			Nepal; W 45–11	Kyrgyzstan; W 43–38	Vietnam; W 45–25	Japan; W 25–21 (gold)
Heo Jun	Individual foil	4 W – 0 L	Q	BYE	H. Hassan (KSA); W 15–5	Son Young-ki (KOR); W 15–11	Yuki Ota (JPN); W 15–14	Ma Jianfei (CHN); L 13–15 (silver)
Son Young-ki	Individual foil	2 W – 2 L	Q	BYE	Cheung Siu Lun (HKG); W 15–8	Heo Jun (KOR); L 11–15	did not advance	
Heo Jun; Son Young-ki; Kim Min-kyu; Kim Hyo-gon	Team foil	—N/a			BYE	Singapore; W 45–21	Japan; L 29–45 (bronze)	did not advance
Gu Bon-gil	Individual sabre	3 W – 1 L	Q	BYE	Vu Thanh An (VIE); W 15–10	Mojtaba Abedini (IRI); W 15–10	Sun Wei (CHN); W 15–10	Kim Jung-hwan (KOR); W 15–13 (gold)
Kim Jung-hwan	Individual sabre	5 W – 0 L	Q	BYE	himamura Tomohirot (JPN); W 15–9	Xu Yingming (CHN); W 15–6	Lam Hin Chung (HKG); W 15–9	Gu Bon-gil (KOR); L 13–15 (silver)
Gu Bon-gil; Kim Jung-hwan; Won Woo-young; Oh Eun-seok	Team sabre	—N/a			BYE	Kuwait; W 45–25	Hong Kong; W 45–23	Iran; W 45–26 (gold)

=== Women ===
Event	Athlete	Round of Poules		Round of 16	Quarterfinals	Semifinals	Final
Event	Athlete	Result	Seed	Opposition Score	Opposition Score	Opposition Score	Opposition Score
Choi In-jeong	Individual épée	5 W – 0 L	Q	B. Gerelmaa (MGL); W 15–4	Lim Cheryl (SIN); W 15–13	Shin A-lam (KOR); L 10–15 (bronze)	did not advance
Shin A-lam	Individual épée	3 W – 1 L	Q	Xu Anqi (CHN); W 15–13	T. Nicole (LIB); W 15–9	Choi In-jeong (KOR); W 15–10	Sun Yujie (CHN); L 5–6 (silver)
Choi In-jeong; Shin A-lam; Kim Myoung-sun; Choi Eun-sook	Team épée	—N/a			Qatar; W 45–17	Japan; W 45–25	China; L 19–43 (silver)
Jeon Hee-sook	Individual foil	5 W – 0 L	Q	BYE	Miyawaki Karin (JPN); W 12–11	Nam Hyun-hee (KOR); W 15–7	Le Huilin (CHN); W 15–6 (gold)
Nam Hyun-hee	Individual foil	3 W – 1 L	Q	Ho Ka U (MAC); W 15–1	Liu Yan Wai (HKG); W 15–4	Jeon Hee-sook (KOR); L 7–15 (bronze)	did not advance
Jeon Hee-sook; Nam Hyun-hee; Oh Ha-na; Kim Mi-na	Team foil	—N/a			BYE	Japan; W 45–29	China; W 32–27 (gold)
Kim Ji-yeon	Individual sabre	4 W – 1 L	Q	BYE	Au Sin Ying (HKG); W 15–4	Shen Chen (CHN); W 15–11	Lee Ra-jin (KOR); L 11–15 (silver)
Lee Ra-jin	Individual sabre	3 W – 1 L	Q	Lau Ywen (SIN); W 15–4	P. Tamara (KAZ); W 15–9	Li Fei (CHN); W 15–7	Kim Ji-yeon (KOR); W 15–11 (gold)
Kim Ji-yeon; Lee Ra-jin; Yoon Ji-su; Hwang Seon-a	Team sabre	—N/a			BYE	Hong Kong; W 45–19	China; W 45–41 (gold)

== Football ==
=== Men ===
Pool Matches

Group A

Pos	Team	Pld	W	D	L	GF	GA	GD	Pts
1	South Korea	3	3	0	0	6	0	+6	9
2	Saudi Arabia	3	2	0	1	6	1	+5	6
3	Malaysia	3	1	0	2	4	6	−2	3
4	Laos	3	0	0	3	0	9	−9	0

Source: RSSSF
September 14, 2014
17:00

South Korea	3–0	Malaysia
Rim Chang-woo 27'; Kim Shin-wook 78'; Kim Seung-dae 82'	Report

Incheon Munhak Stadium
Referee: Abdullah Balideh (Qatar)

September 17, 2014
20:00

South Korea	1–0	Saudi Arabia
Kim Seung-dae 12'	Report

Ansan Wa~ Stadium
Referee: Ma Ning (China)

September 21, 2014
17:00

Laos	0–2	South Korea
	Report	Lee Jong-ho 42'; Kim Seung-dae 89'

Hwaseong Stadium
Referee: Ahmed Al-Kaf (Oman)

Round of 16

September 25
20:00

South Korea	3–0	Hong Kong
Lee Yong-jae 59'; Park Joo-ho 76'; Kim Jin-su 90+3'	Report

Goyang Stadium
Referee: Mohamed Al Zarouni (United Arab Emirates)

Quarter-finals

September 28
17:00

South Korea	1–0	Japan
Jang Hyun-soo 88' (pen.)	Report

Incheon Munhak Stadium
Referee: Mohammed Al Alawaji (Saudi Arabia)

Semi-finals

September 30, 2014
20:00

South Korea	2–0	Thailand
Lee Jong-ho 41'; Jang Hyun-soo 45' (pen.)	Report

Incheon Munhak Stadium
Referee: Mohamed Al Zarouni (United Arab Emirates)

Final

October 2, 2014
20:00

South Korea	1–0 (a.e.t.)	North Korea
Rim Chang-woo 120+1'	Report

Incheon Munhak Stadium
Referee: Abdullah Balideh (Qatar)

=== Women ===
Pool matches Group A

Pos	Team	Pld	W	D	L	GF	GA	GD	Pts
1	South Korea	3	3	0	0	28	0	+28	9
2	Thailand	3	2	0	1	20	5	+15	6
3	India	3	1	0	2	15	20	−5	3
4	Maldives	3	0	0	3	0	38	−38	0

Source: RSSSF
14 September
20:00

South Korea	5–0	Thailand
Jung Seol-bin 11'; Park Hee-young 25'; Yoo Young-a 60'; Jeon Ga-eul 80'; Choe Yu-ri 90+3'

Namdong Asiad Rugby Field, Incheon
Referee: Wang Jia (China)

17 September
20:00

South Korea	10–0	India
Jeon Ga-eul 7', 40', 61' (pen.); Yoo Young-a 9', 45', 63', 65'; Park Hee-young 36'; Jung Seol-bin 49', 79'

Namdong Asiad Rugby Field, Incheon
Referee: Fusako Kajiyama (Japan)

21 September
17:00

Maldives	0–13	South Korea
		Jung Seol-bin 9'; Leeza 24' (o.g.); Lee So-dam 33' (pen.); Song Su-ran 36'; Park Hee-young 38'; Shin Dam-yeong 61'; Jeon Ga-eul 62'; Kwon Hah-nul 66', 84'; Yoo Young-a 69', 82'; Cho So-hyun 75'; Choe Yu-ri 88'

Munhak Stadium, Incheon
Referee: Li Juan (China)

Quarter-finals

26 September
20:00

South Korea	1–0	Chinese Taipei
Jeon Ga-eul 73'

Munhak Stadium, Incheon
Referee: Fusako Kajiyama (Japan)

Semi-finals

29 September
20:00

South Korea	1–2	North Korea
Jung Seol-bin 12'		Ri Ye-gyong 36'; Ho Un-byol 90+3'

Munhak Stadium, Incheon
Referee: Wang Jia (China)

Bronze medal match

1 October
17:00

South Korea	3–0	Vietnam
Kwon Hah-nul 55'; Jung Seol-bin 57'; Park Hee-young 67'

Football Stadium, Incheon
Referee: Nami Imaizumi (Japan)

== Shooting ==
=== Men ===
Event	Athlete	Qualification		Final	
Event	Athlete	Score	Rank	Score	Rank
10m air pistol	Kim Cheong-yong	585-23x	4th Q	201.2	1st place, gold medalist(s)
10m air pistol	Jin Jong-oh	581-29x	7th Q	179.3	3rd place, bronze medalist(s)
10m air pistol	Lee Dae-myung	578-19x	13th	did not advance	
10m air pistol team	Kim Cheong-yong; Jin Jong-oh; Lee Dae-myung	—N/a		1744-71x	1st place, gold medalist(s)
50m pistol	Choi Young-rae	549-11x	20th	did not advance	
50m pistol	Jin Jong-oh	568-13x	1st Q	92.1	7th
50m pistol	Lee Dae-myung	553-7x	14th	did not advance	
50m pistol team	Choi Young-rae; Jin Jong-oh; Lee Dae-myung	—N/a		1670-31x	2nd place, silver medalist(s)

=== Women ===
Event	Athlete	Qualification		Final	
Event	Athlete	Score	Rank	Score	Rank
10m air pistol	Kim Jang-mi	384-13x	1st Q	96.1	7th
10m air pistol	Jung Jee-hae	384-9x	2nd Q	201.3	2nd place, silver medalist(s)
10m air pistol	Oh Min-kyung	372-7x	28th	did not advance	
10m air pistol team	Kim Jang-mi; Jung Jee-hae; Oh Min-kyung	—N/a		1140-29x	4th
25m pistol	Kim Jang-mi	584-19x	3rd Q	16	5th
25m pistol	Kwak Jung-hye	583-20x	5th Q	17/3	4th
25m pistol	Lee Jung-eun	581-9x	6th Q	15	6th
25m pistol team	Kim Jang-mi; Kwak Jung-hye; Lee Jung-eun	—N/a		1748-48x	1st place, gold medalist(s)
10m air rifle	Kim Seol-a	416.0-30x	7th Q	81.5	8th
10m air rifle	Kim Gae-nam	414.4-29x	10th	did not advance	
10m air rifle	Jeong Mi-ra	411.2-27x	27th	did not advance	
10m air rifle team	Kim Seol-a; Kim Gae-nam; Jeong Mi-ra	—N/a		1241.6-86x	3rd place, bronze medalist(s)

== Wushu ==
=== Taolu ===
==== Men ====
Athlete	Event	Changquan			Total	
Athlete	Event	Quality	Performance	Difficulty	Result	Rank
Lee Ha-sung	Changquan	5.00	2.71	2.00	9.71	1st place, gold medalist(s)
