= Archery at the 2018 Asian Games – Men's team recurve =

Archery at the 2018 Asian Games

Men's team recurve at the 2018 Asian Games
- Venue: Gelora Bung Karno Archery Field
- Dates: 21–27 August 2018
- Competitors: 70 from 19 nations

Medalists
gold medal	Chinese Taipei; Luo Wei-min, Tang Chih-chun, Wei Chun-heng
silver medal	South Korea; Kim Woo-jin, Lee Woo-seok, Oh Jin-hyek
bronze medal	China; Li Jialun, Sun Quan, Xu Tianyu

The men's team recurve archery competition at the 2018 Asian Games was held from 21 to 27 August at Gelora Bung Karno Archery Field. A total of 19 teams participated in the ranking round to determine the seeds for knockout round. Each team consisted of the highest ranked three athletes from the qualification round.

== Schedule ==
All times are Western Indonesia Time (UTC+07:00)

Date	Time	Event
Tuesday, 21 August 2018	14:20	Ranking round
Saturday, 25 August 2018	10:20	1/16 eliminations
Saturday, 25 August 2018	10:50	1/8 eliminations
Saturday, 25 August 2018	14:55	Quarterfinals
Saturday, 25 August 2018	16:35	Semifinals
Monday, 27 August 2018	10:20	Bronze medal match
Monday, 27 August 2018	10:45	Gold medal match

== Results ==
=== Ranking round ===
Rank	Team	Half		Total	10s	Xs
Rank	Team	1st	2nd	Total	10s	Xs
1	South Korea (KOR)	1010	1027	2037	116	48
	Im Dong-hyun	336	343	679	39	12
	Kim Woo-jin	~~338~~	~~334~~	~~672~~	~~31~~	~~11~~
	Lee Woo-seok	334	341	675	36	15
	Oh Jin-hyek	340	343	683	41	21
2	Kazakhstan (KAZ)	998	1004	2002	102	28
	Ilfat Abdullin	335	338	673	34	9
	Sultan Duzelbayev	~~328~~	~~323~~	~~651~~	~~22~~	~~8~~
	Denis Gankin	329	340	669	34	12
	Sanzhar Mussayev	334	326	660	34	7
3	Chinese Taipei (TPE)	985	1001	1986	97	31
	Jao Ting-yu	~~322~~	~~323~~	~~645~~	~~23~~	~~8~~
	Luo Wei-min	319	330	649	28	8
	Tang Chih-chun	332	338	670	34	12
	Wei Chun-heng	334	333	667	35	11
4	China (CHN)	1004	982	1986	81	21
	Li Jialun	331	329	660	29	7
	Sun Quan	332	328	660	25	6
	Wei Shaoxuan	~~328~~	~~328~~	~~656~~	~~28~~	~~6~~
	Xu Tianyu	341	325	666	27	8
5	Malaysia (MAS)	974	993	1967	79	25
	Akmal Nor Hasrin	322	335	657	28	8
	Haziq Kamaruddin	321	331	652	25	5
	Khairul Anuar Mohamad	331	327	658	26	12
	Zarif Syahir Zolkepeli	~~326~~	~~325~~	~~651~~	~~23~~	~~6~~
6	Japan (JPN)	982	981	1963	74	24
	Takaharu Furukawa	329	339	668	26	9
	Tomoaki Kuraya	326	320	646	23	8
	Hiroki Muto	327	322	649	25	7
7	Bangladesh (BAN)	977	984	1961	76	26
	Mohammad Tamimul Islam	~~320~~	~~315~~	~~635~~	~~15~~	~~6~~
	Emdadul Haque Milon	322	319	641	22	6
	Ibrahim Sheik Rezowan	320	323	643	19	9
	Ruman Shana	335	342	677	35	11
8	India (IND)	974	982	1956	71	25
	Jagdish Choudhary	314	324	638	19	7
	Atanu Das	332	328	660	26	8
	Sukhchain Singh	~~306~~	~~325~~	~~631~~	~~19~~	~~3~~
	Vishwas	328	330	658	26	10
9	Vietnam (VIE)	985	970	1955	76	25
	Chu Đức Anh	331	324	655	27	8
	Hoàng Văn Lộc	326	324	650	25	12
	Nguyễn Văn Duy	328	322	650	24	5
10	Mongolia (MGL)	981	967	1948	71	29
	Baasankhüügiin Adiyaasüren	329	317	646	21	6
	Jantsangiin Gantögs	~~307~~	~~316~~	~~623~~	~~17~~	~~8~~
	Baatarkhuyagiin Otgonbold	326	330	656	29	13
	Bataagiin Pürevsüren	326	320	646	21	10
11	Indonesia (INA)	964	946	1910	60	23
	Riau Ega Agata	328	321	649	21	9
	Alek Edwar	323	313	636	23	9
	Okka Bagus Subekti	313	312	625	16	5
	Muhammad Hanif Wijaya	~~299~~	~~314~~	~~613~~	~~13~~	~~9~~
12	Iran (IRI)	952	942	1894	63	27
	Erfan Arjangipour	~~303~~	~~308~~	~~611~~	~~16~~	~~4~~
	Sadegh Ashrafi	327	317	644	21	11
	Amin Pirali	320	314	634	22	11
	Milad Vaziri	305	311	616	20	5
13	Thailand (THA)	954	939	1893	50	20
	Tanapat Pathairat	317	320	637	16	6
	Itsarin Thai-uea	~~315~~	~~295~~	~~610~~	~~16~~	~~5~~
	Witthaya Thamwong	323	307	630	18	7
	Denchai Thepna	314	312	626	16	7
14	Nepal (NEP)	934	952	1886	60	17
	Min Prasad Gauchan	~~308~~	~~289~~	~~597~~	~~10~~	~~2~~
	Tilak Pun Magar	324	317	641	22	8
	Roshan Nagarkoti	318	319	637	23	4
	Ashim Sherchan	292	316	608	15	5
15	North Korea (PRK)	944	939	1883	56	15
	Kim Kuk-song	313	305	618	17	8
	Pak Yong-won	319	324	643	22	5
	Ri Tae-bom	312	310	622	17	2
16	Saudi Arabia (KSA)	925	929	1854	46	8
	Fares Al-Otaibi	306	314	620	19	4
	Mansour Alwi	309	312	621	13	2
	Abdalelah Binali	310	303	613	14	2
17	Hong Kong (HKG)	934	902	1836	41	11
	Chui Chun Man	308	291	599	11	5
	Lee Kar Wai	307	307	614	15	3
	Ma Hing Kin	319	304	623	15	3
	Wan Tsz Kit	~~300~~	~~295~~	~~595~~	~~12~~	~~5~~
18	Bhutan (BHU)	904	922	1826	33	5
	Lam Dorji	301	301	602	13	3
	Kinley Tshering	301	314	615	10	0
	Nima Wangdi	302	307	609	10	2
19	Qatar (QAT)	883	895	1778	39	5
	Abdulaziz Al-Abadi	296	280	576	11	2
	Ibrahim Al-Mohanadi	308	315	623	18	1
	Ali Ahmed Salem	279	300	579	10	2

- South Korea replaced Im Dong-hyun with Kim Woo-jin for the knockout round.
- Nepal replaced Ashim Sherchan with Min Prasad Gauchan for the knockout round.

=== Knockout round ===
==== Finals ====
Gold medal match
1	South Korea	55	53	58	55	3
3	Chinese Taipei	56	53	51	56	5

Bronze medal match
4	China	56	58	54	6
10	Mongolia	50	53	52	0

==== Top half ====
1/16 eliminations
17	Hong Kong	50	55	50	1
16	Saudi Arabia	52	56	50	5

1/8 eliminations
1	South Korea	58	57	58	6
16	Saudi Arabia	55	56	51	0
9	Vietnam	49	54	50	52	3
8	India	55	52	55	52	5
5	Malaysia	48	50	55	0
12	Iran	57	52	56	6
13	Thailand	53	54	56	1
4	China	56	54	58	5

Quarterfinals
1	South Korea	54	56	56	5
8	India	54	54	54	1
12	Iran	54	53	50	0
4	China	56	55	51	6

Semifinals
1	South Korea	53	57	55	57	5
4	China	54	54	55	52	3

==== Bottom half ====
1/16 eliminations
19	Qatar	49	47	45	0
14	Nepal	50	51	47	6
15	North Korea	55	55	54	6
18	Bhutan	50	53	50	0

1/8 eliminations
3	Chinese Taipei	56	55	58	6
14	Nepal	50	54	53	0
11	Indonesia	56	53	50	52	2
6	Japan	54	57	57	57	6
7	Bangladesh	53	52	55	55	2
10	Mongolia	51	53	56	56	6
15	North Korea	51	52	56	53	3
2	Kazakhstan	53	57	55	53	5

Quarterfinals
3	Chinese Taipei	55	55	57	6
6	Japan	52	53	54	0
10	Mongolia	55	58	53	51	5
2	Kazakhstan	52	52	57	51	3

Semifinals
3	Chinese Taipei	58	58	56	6
10	Mongolia	53	56	55	0
