= Archery at the 2017 World Games – Men's individual compound =

Sports competition

Men's individual compound at the 2017 World Games
- Venue: AWF Witelona, Wrocław, Poland
- Dates: 29–30 July 2017
- Competitors: 24 from 16 nations

Medalists
gold medal	(Denmark) Stephan Hansen
silver medal	(Iran) Esmaeil Ebadi
bronze medal	(Croatia) Domagoj Buden

The men's compound archery individual competition at the 2017 World Games took place from 29 to 30 July 2017 at the AWF Witelona in Wrocław, Poland.

== Results ==
=== Ranking round ===
Rank	Archer	Nation	Score	10s	Xs
1	Stephan Hansen	Denmark	716 (WGQ)	68	36
2	Mike Schloesser	Netherlands	714	67	37
3	Dominique Genet	France	711	64	27
4	Kris Schaff	United States	708	60	27
5	Peter Elzinga	Netherlands	707	59	24
6	Sebastien Peineau	France	707	59	23
7	Esmaeil Ebadi	Iran	706	60	28
8	Reo Wilde	United States	706	58	23
9	Rodolfo González	Mexico	705	58	35
10	Roberto Hernández	El Salvador	704	57	31
11	Domagoj Buden	Croatia	703	57	23
12	Abhishek Verma	India	703	56	29
13	Pat Coghlan	Australia	703	55	27
14	Camilo Cardona	Colombia	703	55	23
15	Septimus Cilliers	South Africa	702	54	18
16	Danie Oosthuizen	Australia	701	53	31
17	Alberto Blázquez	Spain	700	52	29
18	Juwaidi Mazuki	Malaysia	699	54	25
19	Łukasz Przybylski	Poland	699	53	21
20	Martin Damsbo	Denmark	699	52	19
21	Ivan Markeš	Croatia	696	48	21
22	Louw Nel	Namibia	688	46	15
23	Khambeswaran Mohanaraja	Malaysia	682	39	13
24	Riaan Crowther	South Africa	679	36	19

=== Competition bracket ===
Round of 32; 29 July
17	(Spain) Alberto Blázquez	142
16	(Australia) Danie Oosthuizen	139
9	(Mexico) Rodolfo González	146
24	(South Africa) Riaan Crowther	143
21	(Croatia) Ivan Markeš	147
12	(India) Abhishek Verma	146
13	(Australia) Pat Coghlan	142
20	(Denmark) Martin Damsbo	144
19	(Poland) Łukasz Przybylski	134
14	(Colombia) Camilo Cardona	147
11	(Croatia) Domagoj Buden	147
22	(Namibia) Louw Nel	140
23	(Malaysia) Khambeswaran Mohanaraja	136
10	(El Salvador) Roberto Hernández	146
15	(South Africa) Septimus Cilliers	149
18	(Malaysia) Juwaidi Mazuki	147

Round of 16; 29 July
1	(Denmark) Stephan Hansen	149
17	(Spain) Alberto Blázquez	147
9	(Mexico) Rodolfo González	146
8	(United States) Reo Wilde	148
5	(Netherlands) Peter Elzinga	149
21	(Croatia) Ivan Markeš	147
20	(Denmark) Martin Damsbo	145*
4	(United States) Kris Schaff	145
3	(France) Dominique Genet	145
14	(Colombia) Camilo Cardona	148
11	(Croatia) Domagoj Buden	147
6	(France) Sebastien Peineau	145
7	(Iran) Esmaeil Ebadi	150
10	(El Salvador) Roberto Hernández	148
15	(South Africa) Septimus Cilliers	146
2	(Netherlands) Mike Schloesser	149

Quarter-finals; 29 July
1	(Denmark) Stephan Hansen	150
8	(United States) Reo Wilde	148
5	(Netherlands) Peter Elzinga	148
20	(Denmark) Martin Damsbo	144
14	(Colombia) Camilo Cardona	147
11	(Croatia) Domagoj Buden	147*
7	(Iran) Esmaeil Ebadi	147
2	(Netherlands) Mike Schloesser	146

Semi-finals; 30 July
1	(Denmark) Stephan Hansen	146
5	(Netherlands) Peter Elzinga	141
11	(Croatia) Domagoj Buden	143
7	(Iran) Esmaeil Ebadi	143*

Finals; 30 July
1	(Denmark) Stephan Hansen	146
7	(Iran) Esmaeil Ebadi	142
Third place 30 July
5	(Netherlands) Peter Elzinga	141
11	(Croatia) Domagoj Buden	144
