= Li Jialun =

Chinese archer (born 1993)

Personal information
- Born: 13 January 1993 (age 33) Yantai, Shandong, China

Sport
- Country: China
- Sport: Archery
- Event: Recurve
Medal record
Men's recurve archery
Representing China
World Cup
Silver medal – second place	2018 Salt Lake City	Team
Asian Games
Bronze medal – third place	2018 Jakarta	Team

Li Jialun (Chinese: 李佳伦, born 13 January 1993) is a Chinese archer. He competed in the men's individual event at the 2020 Summer Olympics.

In 2014, he competed in the men's individual recurve and men's team recurve events at the 2014 Asian Games held in Incheon, South Korea. In 2018, he won the bronze medal in the men's team recurve event at the 2018 Asian Games held in Jakarta, Indonesia. He also competed in the men's individual recurve and mixed team recurve events.
