= Archery at the 2014 Asian Games – Men's individual compound =

Men's individual compound at the 2014 Asian Games
- Venue: Gyeyang Asiad Archery Field
- Dates: 23–27 September 2014
- Competitors: 56 from 18 nations

Medalists
gold medal	Esmaeil Ebadi	Iran
silver medal	Abhishek Verma	India
bronze medal	Paul Dela Cruz	Philippines

The men's individual compound archery competition at the 2014 Asian Games in Incheon was held from 23 to 27 September at Gyeyang Asiad Archery Field.

A total of 55 archers participated in the qualification round after one pulled out. Only the top two archers from each country were allowed to progress to the knockout stage.

== Schedule ==
All times are Korea Standard Time (UTC+09:00)

Date	Time	Event
Tuesday, 23 September 2014	10:00	Ranking round
Thursday, 25 September 2014	10:40	1/32 eliminations
Thursday, 25 September 2014	11:10	1/16 eliminations
Thursday, 25 September 2014	11:40	1/8 eliminations
Thursday, 25 September 2014	16:46	Quarterfinals
Saturday, 27 September 2014	14:58	Semifinals
Saturday, 27 September 2014	15:58	Bronze medal match
Saturday, 27 September 2014	16:12	Gold medal match

== Results ==
Legend

- DNS — Did not start

=== Ranking round ===
Rank	Seed	Athlete	Half		Total	10s	Xs
Rank	Seed	Athlete	1st	2nd	Total	10s	Xs
1	1	Esmaeil Ebadi (IRI)	355	355	710	63	26
2	2	Choi Yong-hee (KOR)	349	357	706	59	27
3	3	Amir Kazempour (IRI)	347	355	702	54	22
4	4	Paul Dela Cruz (PHI)	350	351	701	55	17
5	—	Yang Young-ho (KOR)	347	354	701	53	26
6	5	Sandeep Kumar (IND)	348	352	700	52	24
7	—	Kim Jong-ho (KOR)	346	353	699	51	12
8	6	Chen Po-kai (TPE)	343	355	698	53	26
9	7	Abhishek Verma (IND)	346	352	698	50	24
10	—	Rajat Chauhan (IND)	347	350	697	51	18
11	8	Pavel Fisher (KAZ)	346	350	696	49	23
12	9	Min Li-hong (KOR)	349	346	695	48	21
13	10	Nguyễn Tiến Cương (VIE)	342	351	693	48	23
14	—	Govindas Singh (IND)	340	351	691	46	25
15	—	Majid Gheidi (IRI)	348	343	691	46	19
16	11	Zaki Mahazan (MAS)	349	342	691	45	16
17	12	Kung Lin-hsiang (TPE)	345	345	690	46	19
18	—	Majid Kianzad (IRI)	344	345	689	43	19
19	13	Earl Yap (PHI)	346	342	688	44	22
20	14	Denchai Thepna (THA)	342	346	688	43	19
21	15	Abdulaziz Al-Rodhan (KSA)	345	342	687	46	17
22	16	Eshaq Ibrahim (IRQ)	341	345	686	44	17
23	17	Juwaidi Mazuki (MAS)	340	345	685	40	15
24	18	Sapriatno (INA)	343	341	684	39	14
25	—	Ian Chipeco (PHI)	337	347	684	38	16
26	19	Nguyễn Tuấn Anh (VIE)	338	343	681	38	16
27	—	Wang Chih-hao (TPE)	338	341	679	36	13
28	—	Lee Kin Lip (MAS)	338	339	677	33	13
29	20	Chan Pak Ki (HKG)	336	340	676	36	13
30	—	Jose Adriano (PHI)	339	337	676	36	13
31	—	Kaharuddin Ashah (MAS)	336	338	674	30	9
32	21	Muidh Al-Baqami (KSA)	341	331	672	36	11
33	22	Abdulaziz Al-Abadi (QAT)	333	339	672	34	9
34	—	Nguyễn Thanh Tuấn (VIE)	328	342	670	33	13
35	23	Artyom Kichkin (KAZ)	335	335	670	32	7
36	24	Thanonglith Siriphonh (LAO)	335	335	670	32	4
37	25	Jargalsaikhany Tulga (MGL)	333	336	669	35	11
38	26	Pürevdorjiin Jamiyangombo (MGL)	331	337	668	34	15
39	27	Waleed Hameed (IRQ)	335	333	668	34	12
40	—	Li Hsi-hsin (TPE)	333	335	668	32	12
41	28	Tsui Wai Hung (HKG)	329	339	668	31	11
42	29	Ahmed Al-Abadi (QAT)	333	334	667	31	14
43	30	Shein Htet Kyaw (MYA)	330	337	667	29	12
44	—	Turki Al-Derbi (KSA)	331	331	662	28	11
45	—	Akbarali Karabayev (KAZ)	331	331	662	23	7
46	31	Muslim Ebrahim (KUW)	333	326	659	40	19
47	—	Mosab Sulaimani (KSA)	320	335	655	24	11
48	—	Tang Kam Wo (HKG)	326	319	645	23	4
49	—	Andrey Kim (KAZ)	324	321	645	22	8
50	32	Khamvarn Vanlivong (LAO)	311	328	639	17	2
51	—	Daliya Saidara (LAO)	318	315	633	19	9
52	—	Abdullah Ali (IRQ)	311	322	633	17	5
53	—	Nyamsürengiin Ölziikhutag (MGL)	317	309	626	22	4
54	33	Salem Al-Saeed (KUW)	299	317	616	19	7
55	—	Khadher Monser (QAT)	304	282	586	10	5
—	—	Israf Khan (QAT)			DNS		

=== Knockout round ===
==== Finals ====
Semifinals
1	Esmaeil Ebadi (IRI)	146
4	Paul Dela Cruz (PHI)	140
11	Zaki Mahazan (MAS)	135
7	Abhishek Verma (IND)	143

Gold medal match
1	Esmaeil Ebadi (IRI)	145
7	Abhishek Verma (IND)	141
Bronze medal match
3	Paul Dela Cruz (PHI)	140
11	Zaki Mahazan (MAS)	139

==== Section 1 ====
1/32 eliminations
33	Salem Al-Saeed (KUW)	110
32	Khamvarn Vanlivong (LAO)	132

1/16 eliminations
1	Esmaeil Ebadi (IRI)	148
32	Khamvarn Vanlivong (LAO)	135
17	Juwaidi Mazuki (MAS)	141
16	Eshaq Ibrahim (IRQ)	144
9	Min Li-hong (KOR)	143
24	Thanonglith Siriphonh (LAO)	135
25	Jargalsaikhany Tulga (MGL)	136
8	Pavel Fisher (KAZ)	142

1/8 eliminations
1	Esmaeil Ebadi (IRI)	149
16	Eshaq Ibrahim (IRQ)	142
9	Min Li-hong (KOR)	142
8	Pavel Fisher (KAZ)	137

Quarterfinals
1	Esmaeil Ebadi (IRI)	149
9	Min Li-hong (KOR)	145

==== Section 2 ====
1/32 eliminations

1/16 eliminations
5	Sandeep Kumar (IND)	144
28	Tsui Wai Hung (HKG)	135
21	Muidh Al-Baqami (KSA)	136
12	Kung Lin-hsiang (TPE)	142
13	Earl Yap (PHI)	144
20	Chan Pak Ki (HKG)	141
29	Ahmed Al-Abadi (QAT)	138
4	Paul Dela Cruz (PHI)	141

1/8 eliminations
5	Sandeep Kumar (IND)	148
12	Kung Lin-hsiang (TPE)	143
13	Earl Yap (PHI)	141
4	Paul Dela Cruz (PHI)	145

Quarterfinals
5	Sandeep Kumar (IND)	135
4	Paul Dela Cruz (PHI)	141

==== Section 3 ====
1/32 eliminations

1/16 eliminations
3	Amir Kazempour (IRI)	142
30	Shein Htet Kyaw (MYA)	138
19	Nguyễn Tuấn Anh (VIE)	139
14	Denchai Thepna (THA)	137
11	Zaki Mahazan (MAS)	139
22	Abdulaziz Al-Abadi (QAT)	133
27	Waleed Hameed (IRQ)	127
6	Chen Po-kai (TPE)	146

1/8 eliminations
3	Amir Kazempour (IRI)	144
19	Nguyễn Tuấn Anh (VIE)	139
11	Zaki Mahazan (MAS)	142
6	Chen Po-kai (TPE)	136

Quarterfinals
3	Amir Kazempour (IRI)	140^{9}
11	Zaki Mahazan (MAS)	140^{10}

==== Section 4 ====
1/32 eliminations

1/16 eliminations
7	Abhishek Verma (IND)	146
26	Pürevdorjiin Jamiyangombo (MGL)	144
23	Artyom Kichkin (KAZ)	135
10	Nguyễn Tiến Cương (VIE)	136
15	Abdulaziz Al-Rodhan (KSA)	141
18	Sapriatno (INA)	144
31	Muslim Ebrahim (KUW)	134
2	Choi Yong-hee (KOR)	145

1/8 eliminations
7	Abhishek Verma (IND)	148
10	Nguyễn Tiến Cương (VIE)	143
18	Sapriatno (INA)	140
2	Choi Yong-hee (KOR)	146

Quarterfinals
7	Abhishek Verma (IND)	147
2	Choi Yong-hee (KOR)	142
