= Gu Xuesong =

Chinese archer (born 1993)

Personal information
- Born: 21 June 1993 (age 33) Shanghai, China
- Height: 1.78 m (5 ft 10 in)
- Weight: 76 kg (168 lb)

Sport
- Country: China
- Sport: Archery
- Event: Recurve
Medal record
Men's archery
Representing China
Asian Games
Gold medal – first place	2014 Incheon	Team
World Championships
Bronze medal – third place	2015 Copenhagen	Mixed team
- Updated on 22 February 2017

Gu Xuesong (Chinese: 顾雪松; pinyin: Gù Xuěsōng; born 21 June 1993) is a Chinese competitive archer. He has won two medals, a gold in the men's team recurve and a bronze in the mixed team, in a major international tournament, spanning the Asian Games and the World Championships.

Gu rose to prominence in the world archery scene at the 2014 Asian Games in Incheon, South Korea. There, he and his teammates Yong Zhiwei and Qi Kaiyao powered past the Malaysian side in straight sets (6–0) to capture the men's team recurve title.

At the 2015 World Championships, Gu contributed to the Chinese trio's effort by finishing fifth and securing the full quota spot for Rio 2016. On that same season, he and his compatriots Yong and Xing Yu confidently knocked out the Canadians 6–0 towards their golden finish in the men's team recurve at an Olympic test event in Rio de Janeiro.

Gu was selected to compete for the Chinese squad at the 2016 Summer Olympics in Rio de Janeiro, shooting in both individual and team recurve tournaments. First, he recorded 670 points out of a possible 720 to lead the Chinese threesome for the seventeenth seed heading to the knockout stage, along with an aggregate score of 1,997 produced by the trio in the classification round. Sitting at sixth in the men's team recurve, Gu, along with Xing and Wang Dapeng, scored an upset 6–0 victory over the defending champion Italy in the quarterfinals, before they dropped the semifinal match to the Americans with a 2–6. Attempting to retaliate on Australia for the podium lock, the Chinese trio could not edge their rivals out by a two-set deficit (2–6), but finished outside of medals in fourth instead. In the men's individual recurve, Gu lost the opening round match to Kazakhstan's Sultan Duzelbayev with a score of 4–6.
