= Song Mi-young =

South Korean handball player (born 1975)

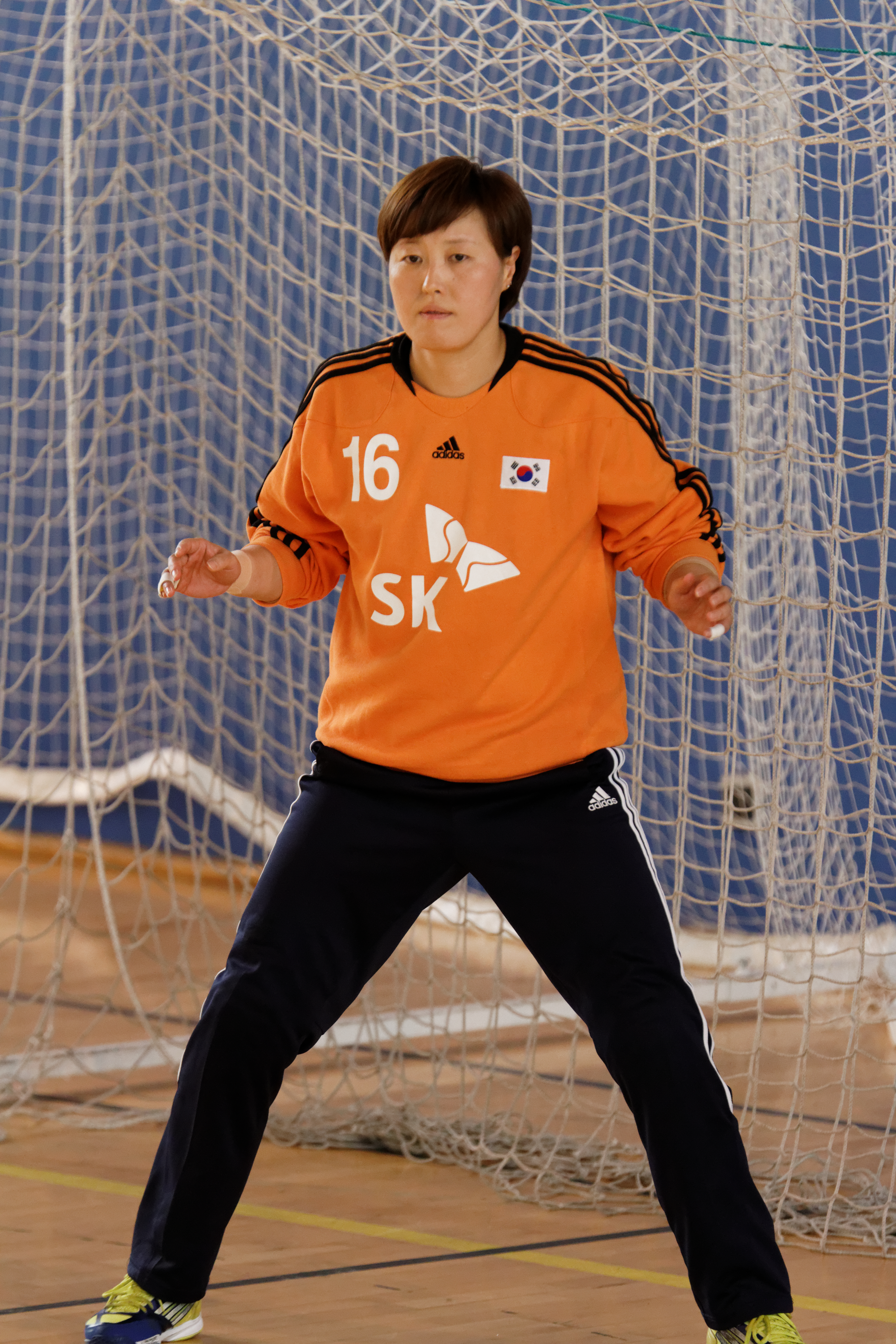

Personal information
- Nationality: South Korean
- Born: 16 January 1975 (age 51)
- Height: 1.72 m (5 ft 8 in)

Sport
- Sport: Handball
- Position: Goalkeeper
- Current club: Incheon Sports Council
National team
- Years: Team
- –: South Korea

- Song Mi-young
- Hangul: 송미영
- RR: Song Miyeong
- MR: Song Miyŏng

Song Mi-young (born 16 January 1975) is a South Korean handball player for Incheon Sports Council and the South Korean Republic national team.
