= Yong Zhiwei =

Chinese archer

Personal information
- Born: 3 August 1992 (age 33)
Medal record
Men's recurve archery
Representing China
Asian Games
Gold medal – first place	2014 Incheon	Team
Silver medal – second place	2014 Incheon	Individual

Yong Zhiwei (Chinese: 雍智伟, born 3 August 1992) is a Chinese professional archer who represented China at the 2014 Archery World Cup and the 2014 Asian Games. In archery at the 2014 Asian Games, he won a silver medal in the men's individual recurve event and a gold medal in the men's team recurve event with teammates Gu Xuesong and Qi Kaiyao.
