= Bhutan at the 2014 Asian Games =

- IOC code: BHU
- NOC: Bhutan Olympic Committee

in Incheon
- Competitors: 16 in 6 sports
- Medals Ranked 38th: Gold 0 Silver 0 Bronze 0 Total 0

Asian Games appearances (overview)
- 1986; 1990; 1994; 1998; 2002; 2006; 2010; 2014; 2018; 2022; 2026

Bhutan participated in the 2014 Asian Games in Incheon, South Korea from 19 September to 4 October 2014. It did not win any medals.

The Asian Games, also known as Asiad, is a continental multi-sport event held every four years for athletes of Asia. The Games were regulated by Asian Games Federation from the first Games in New Delhi, India in 1951, until the 1978 Games.

== Archery ==
Men

Athlete	Event	Ranking round		Round of 64	Round of 32	Round of 16	Quarterfinals	Semifinals	Final	
Athlete	Event	Score	Seed	Opposition Score	Opposition Score	Opposition Score	Opposition Score	Opposition Score	Opposition Score	Rank
Jigme Norbu	Men's individual recurve	1175	54	Jasim (IRQ); L 2–6	did not advance					
Karma Tshering	Men's individual recurve	1088	61	did not advance						
Kinley Tshering	Men's individual recurve	1174	55	Sodikov (UZB); W 6–4	Furukawa (JPN); W 6–5	Pak (PRK); L 1–7	did not advance			
Jigme Norbu; Karma Tshering; Kinley Tshering	Men's team recurve	3437	15	—N/a		Japan; L 0–6	did not advance			

Women

Athlete	Event	Ranking round		Round of 64	Round of 32	Round of 16	Quarterfinals	Semifinals	Final	
Athlete	Event	Score	Seed	Opposition Score	Opposition Score	Opposition Score	Opposition Score	Opposition Score	Opposition Score	Rank
Choki Wangmo	Women's individual recurve	1070	55	did not advance						

== Athletics ==
=== Men ===
Track events

Athletes	Event	Heats		Semifinal		Final	
Athletes	Event	Result	Rank	Result	Rank	Result	Rank
Lhaba Tshering	200 m	24.18	7	did not advance			

== Shooting ==
Women

Athlete	Event	Qualification		Final	
Athlete	Event	Score	Rank	Score	Rank
Lenchu Kunzang	Air rifle	398.5-16x	47th	did not advance	

== Tennis ==
Athlete	Event	Round of 64	Round of 32	Round of 16	Quarterfinals	Semifinals	Final
Athlete	Event	Opposition Result	Opposition Result	Opposition Result	Opposition Result	Opposition Result	Opposition Result
Tandin Wangchuck	Men's singles	Ernepesow (TKM); L 0–2	did not advance				
