= Esmaeil Ebadi =

Iranian archer (born 1976)

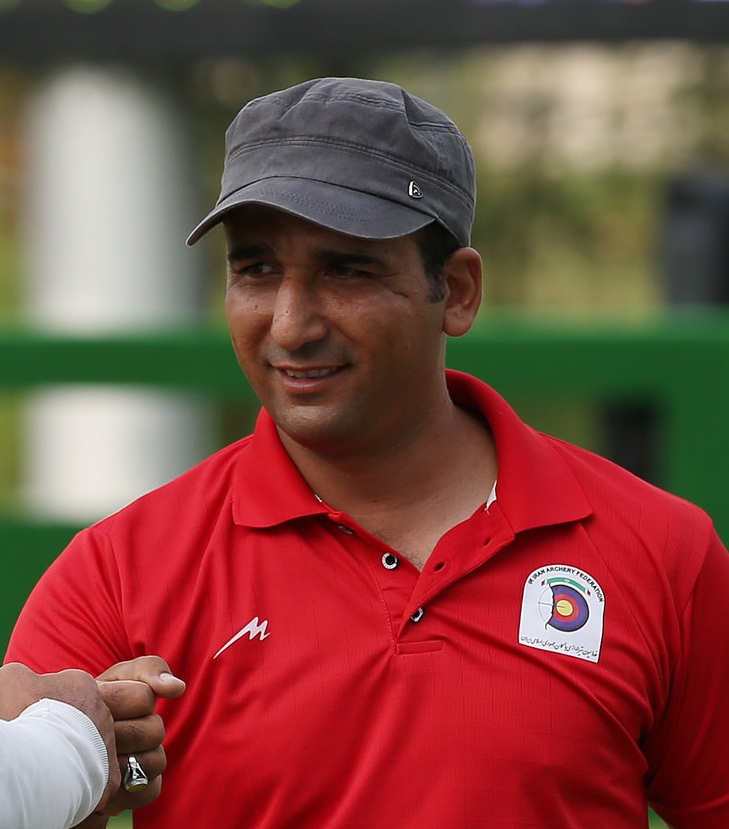

Personal information
- Born: August 11, 1976 (age 50) Iran
- Education: Information Technology; Qazvin Islamic Azad University
- Height: 1.80 m (5 ft 11 in)
- Weight: 85 kg (187 lb)

Sport
- Country: Iran
- Sport: Archery
Medal record
Representing Iran
Men's compound archery
World Games
Silver medal – second place	2017 Wrocław	Individual
World Championships
Gold medal – first place	2015 Copenhagen	Team
Asian Games
Gold medal – first place	2014 Incheon	Individual
Bronze medal – third place	2014 Incheon	Team
Asian Championships
Silver medal – second place	2015 Bangkok	Mixed team
Bronze medal – third place	2015 Bangkok	Individual
Bronze medal – third place	2015 Bangkok	Team
Islamic Solidarity Games
Gold medal – first place	2013 Palembang	Individual
Gold medal – first place	2013 Palembang	Team

Esmaeil Ebadi (Persian: اسماعیل عبادی, born 11 August 1976) is an Iranian Archer who won the gold medal at the 2014 Asian Games. He also won a gold medal in 2015 World Archery Championships in team event.
