= Artyom Gankin =

Kazakhstani archer

Personal information
- Born: 30 August 1991 (age 34)

Sport
- Country: Kazakhstan
- Sport: Archery
- Event: Recurve
Medal record
Men's recurve archery
Representing Kazakhstan
Asian Championships
Bronze medal – third place	2011 Tehran	Team

Artyom Pavlovich Gankin (Kazakh: Артем Павлович Ганкин; born 30 August 1991) is a Kazakhstani male recurve archer. He competed at the 2013 World Archery Championships in the men's individual event.

He is the brother of Denis Gankin.
