= Jit Bahadur Muktan =

Nepalese archer (born 1979)

Jitbahadur Moktan
Personal information
- Born: 31 August 1979 (age 46)
- Height: 170 cm (5 ft 7 in)

Sport
- Country: Nepal
- Sport: Archery
- Event: Recurve
- Updated on 26 July 2016

Jitbahadur Moktan (born 31 August 1979) is a male Nepalese recurve archer. He competed in the archery competition at the 2016 Summer Olympics in Rio de Janeiro. He is a member of the Manang Marshyangdi Archery Team based in Kathmandu.
