= Hideki Kikuchi =

Japanese archer (born 1986)

Personal information
- Native name: 菊地 栄樹
- Born: 27 January 1986 (age 40) Hiroshima, Japan
- Height: 182 cm (6 ft 0 in) (2012)
- Weight: 80 kg (180 lb) (2012)
Medal record
Men's recurve archery
Representing Japan
World Championships
Bronze medal – third place	2009 Ulsan	Team
World Indoor Championships
Silver medal – second place	2014 Nîmes	Team
Asian Championships
Silver medal – second place	2011 Tehran	Individual
Silver medal – second place	2015 Bangkok	Team

Hideki Kikuchi (菊地 栄樹, born 27 January 1986 in Hiroshima) is a Japanese archer. At the 2012 Summer Olympics he competed for his country in the Men's team event obtaining the 6th place in Team competition and 66th place in Individual competition.
