= Lee Seung-yun =

South Korean archer (born 1995)

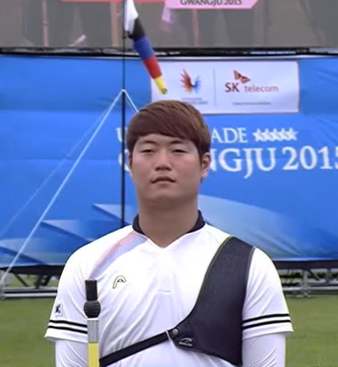
- Lee in 2015

Personal information
- Native name: 이승윤
- Born: 18 April 1995 (age 31) Incheon, South Korea
- Height: 174 cm (5 ft 9 in)
- Weight: 80 kg (176 lb)

Sport
- Country: South Korea
- Sport: Archery
- Event: Recurve
- Coached by: Park Chae-soon (박채순); Seo Oh-seok (서오석)
Medal record
Men's recurve archery
Representing South Korea
Olympic Games
Gold medal – first place	2016 Rio de Janeiro	Team
World Championships
Gold medal – first place	2013 Belek	Individual
Bronze medal – third place	2019 's-Hertogenbosch	Team
Asian Games
Bronze medal – third place	2014 Incheon	Team
Asian Championships
Gold medal – first place	2015 Bangkok	Team
Gold medal – first place	2017 Dhaka	Individual
Gold medal – first place	2017 Dhaka	Team
Gold medal – first place	2021 Dhaka	Individual
Gold medal – first place	2021 Dhaka	Team
Gold medal – first place	2021 Dhaka	Mixed team
Silver medal – second place	2015 Bangkok	Individual
Summer Universiade
Gold medal – first place	2015 Gwangju	Individual
Gold medal – first place	2015 Gwangju	Mixed Team
Gold medal – first place	2015 Gwangju	Team
Gold medal – first place	2017 Taipei	Individual
Gold medal – first place	2017 Taipei	Mixed Team
Gold medal – first place	2017 Taipei	Team
World Youth Championships
Silver medal – second place	2011 Legnica	Team
Bronze medal – third place	2011 Legnica	Individual
- Updated on 29 July 2023

Lee Seung-yun (Korean: 이승윤; Korean pronunciation: [i.sɯŋ.jun]; born 18 April 1995) is a South Korean archer.

== Career ==
After winning medals at the World Youth Championships, he was first selected for the South Korean archery team in 2013, in which year he won team and individual medals at the 2013 Archery World Cup, finishing 4th in the World Cup Final in Paris, and reached the final of the 2013 World Archery Championships where he defeated teammate and Olympic champion Oh Jin-hyek. He reached a career high world ranking of 5 in 2013, and in 2016 he ranked 8th.

Lee, in his first international season, never finished out of the top eight in competition. As well as his world title, he qualified for the World Cup Final courtesy of an individual gold medal at the fourth World Cup stage of the year in Wroclaw.

During the 2016 Summer Olympics, he won gold as part of the South Korean team, and qualified for the men's individual round.
