= Lee Kar Wai =

Hong Kong archer (born 1983)

Lee Kar Wai "Calvin" (Chinese: 李嘉威; Jyutping: lei^{5} gaa^{1} wai^{1}; born 3 April 1983 in Hong Kong) is a Hong Konger archer. He competed in the individual event at the 2012 Summer Olympics.
