= Jantsangiin Gantögs =

Mongolian archer (born 1972)

Personal information
- Born: 12 April 1972 (age 54) Moscow, Soviet Union

Sport
- Country: Mongolia
- Sport: Archery
Medal record
Men's recurve archery
Representing Mongolia
Asian Championships
Silver medal – second place	2013 Taipei	Individual

Jantsangiin Gantögs (Mongolian: Жанцангийн Гантөгс; born 12 April 1972 in Moscow, Soviet Union) is a Mongolian archer. He competed in the individual event at the 2012 Summer Olympics.
