= Denis Gankin =

Kazakhstani archer (born 1989)

Personal information
- Born: 13 December 1989 (age 36) Taldykorgan, Kazakh SSR, Soviet Union

Sport
- Country: Kazakhstan
- Sport: Archery
- Event: Recurve
Medal record
Men's recurve archery
Representing Kazakhstan
Asian Championships
| Gold medal – first place | 2011 Tehran | Mixed team |
| Bronze medal – third place | 2011 Tehran | Team |

Denis Pavlovich Gankin (Kazakh: Денис Павлович Ганькин, born 13 December 1989 in Taldykorgan, Kazakh SSR, Soviet Union) is a Kazakhstani archer. He competed at the 2012 Summer Olympics in London, where he reached the second round.

He is the older brother of Artyom Gankin.
