= List of World Championships medalists in archery =

This is a List of World Championships medalists in outdoor target archery. The World Archery Championships are one of the three pinnacle events organised by the World Archery Federation and the event with the longest continuous history, the others being the Olympic archery competition (1972–) and the World Cup (2006–).

== Host cities ==
Number	Year	Location	Events
1	1931	(Poland) Lwów	2
2	1932	(Poland) Warsaw	2
3	1933	(United Kingdom) London	4
4	1934	(Sweden) Båstad	4
5	1935	(Belgium) Brussels	4
6	1936	(Czechoslovakia) Prague	4
7	1937	(France) Paris	4
8	1938	(United Kingdom) London	4
9	1939	(Norway) Oslo	4
10	1946	(Sweden) Stockholm	4
11	1947	(Czechoslovakia) Prague	4
12	1948	(United Kingdom) London	4
13	1949	(France) Paris	4
14	1950	(Denmark) Copenhagen	4
15	1952	(Belgium) Brussels	4
16	1954	(Norway) Oslo	4
17	1955	(Finland) Helsinki	4
18	1957	(Czechoslovakia) Prague	4
19	1958	(Belgium) Brussels	4
20	1959	(Sweden) Stockholm	4
21	1961	(Norway) Oslo	4
22	1963	(Finland) Helsinki	4
23	1965	(Sweden) Västerås	4
24	1967	(Netherlands) Amersfoort	4
25	1969	(United States) Valley Forge	4
26	1971	(United Kingdom) York	4
27	1973	(France) Grenoble	4
28	1975	(Switzerland) Interlaken	4
29	1977	(Australia) Canberra	4
30	1979	(West Germany) Berlin	4
31	1981	(Italy) Punta Ala	4
32	1983	(United States) Los Angeles	4
33	1985	(South Korea) Seoul	4
34	1987	(Australia) Adelaide	4
35	1989	(Switzerland) Lausanne	4
36	1991	(Poland) Kraków	4
37	1993	(Turkey) Antalya	4
38	1995	(Indonesia) Jakarta	8
39	1997	(Canada) Victoria	8
40	1999	(France) Riom	8
41	2001	(China) Beijing	8
42	2003	(United States) New York	8
43	2005	(Spain) Madrid	8
44	2007	(Germany) Leipzig	8
45	2009	(South Korea) Ulsan	8
46	2011	(Italy) Turin	10
47	2013	(Turkey) Belek	10
48	2015	(Denmark) Copenhagen	10
49	2017	Mexico City	10
50	2019	(Netherlands) 's-Hertogenbosch	10
51	2021	(United States) Yankton	10
52	2023	(Germany) Berlin	10
53	2025	(South Korea) Gwangju	10

Host cities of the World Archery Championships
Host cities of the World Archery Championships (Europe – modern borders shown)

=== Champions ===
==== Recurve ====
Year	Location	Men's Individual	Women's Individual	Men's Team	Women's Team	Mixed Team	Ref
1931	(Poland) Lwów	Michal Sawicki (POL)		France ^{1}			
1932	(Poland) Warsaw	Laurent Reth (BEL)		Poland ^{1}			
1933	(United Kingdom) London	Donald MacKenzie (USA)	Janina Kurkowska (POL)	Belgium ^{1}	Poland ^{1}		
1934	(Sweden) Båstad	Henry Kjellson (SWE)	Janina Kurkowska (POL)	Sweden ^{1}	Poland ^{1}		
1935	(Belgium) Brussels	Adrien Van Kolen (BEL); Jaroslav Lenecek (TCH)^{2}	Ina Catani (SWE)	Czechoslovakia ^{1}	Great Britain ^{1}		
1936	(Czechoslovakia) Prague	Emil Heilborn (SWE)	Janina Kurkowska (POL)	Czechoslovakia ^{1}	Poland ^{1}		
1937	(France) Paris	Georges De Rons (BEL)	Erna Simon (GBR)	Poland	Great Britain		
1938	(United Kingdom) London	František Hadaš I (TCH)	Nora Weston-Martyr (GBR); Louise Nettleton (GBR)	Czechoslovakia	Poland		
1939	(Norway) Oslo	Roger Beday (FRA)	Janina Kurkowska (POL)	France	Poland		
1946	(Sweden) Stockholm	Einar Tang-Holbeck (DEN)	Petronella de Wharton-Burr (GBR)	Denmark	Great Britain		
1947	(Czechoslovakia) Prague	Hans Deutgen (SWE)	Janina Kurkowska (POL)	Czechoslovakia	Denmark		
1948	(United Kingdom) London	Hans Deutgen (SWE)	Petronella de Wharton-Burr (GBR)	Sweden	Czechoslovakia		
1949	(France) Paris	Hans Deutgen (SWE)	Barbara Waterhouse (GBR)	Czechoslovakia	Great Britain		
1950	(Denmark) Copenhagen	Hans Deutgen (SWE)	Jean Lee (USA)	Denmark	Finland		
1952	(Belgium) Brussels	Stellan Andersson (SWE)	Jean Lee (USA)	Sweden	United States		
1953	(Norway) Oslo	Bror Lundgren (SWE)	Jean Richards (USA)	Sweden	Finland		
1955	(Finland) Helsinki	Nils Andersson (SWE)	Katarzyna Wisniowska (POL)	Sweden	Great Britain		
1957	(Czechoslovakia) Prague	O. K. Smathers (USA)	Carole Meinhart (USA)	United States	United States		
1958	(Belgium) Brussels	Stig Thysell (SWE)	Sigrid Johannson (SWE)	Finland	United States		
1959	(Sweden) Stockholm	James Caspers (USA)	Ann Corby (USA)	United States	United States		
1961	(Norway) Oslo	Joe Thornton (USA)	Nancy Vonderheide (USA)	United States	United States		
1963	(Finland) Helsinki	Charles Sandlin (USA)	Victoria Cook (USA)	United States	United States		
1965	(Sweden) Västerås	Matti Haikonen (FIN)	Maire Lindholm (FIN)	United States	United States		
1967	(Netherlands) Amersfoort	Ray Rogers (USA)	Maria Maczynska (POL)	United States	Poland		
1969	(United States) Valley Forge	Hardy Ward (USA)	Dorothy Lidstone (CAN)	United States	Soviet Union		
1971	(United Kingdom) York	John Williams (USA)	Emma Gapchenko (URS)	United States	Poland		
1973	(France) Grenoble	Victor Sidoruk (URS)	Linda Myers (USA)	United States	Soviet Union		
1975	(Switzerland) Interlaken	Darrell Pace (USA)	Zebiniso Rustamova (URS)	United States	Soviet Union		
1977	(Australia) Canberra	Richard McKinney (USA)	Luann Ryon (USA)	United States	United States		
1979	(West Germany) Berlin	Darrell Pace (USA)	Kim Jin-Ho (KOR)	United States	South Korea		
1981	(Italy) Punta Ala	Kyösti Laasonen (FIN)	Natalya Butuzova (URS)	United States	Soviet Union		
1983	(United States) Los Angeles	Richard McKinney (USA)	Kim Jin-Ho (KOR)	United States	South Korea		
1985	(South Korea) Seoul	Richard McKinney (USA)	Irina Soldatova (URS)	South Korea	Soviet Union		
1987	(Australia) Adelaide	Vladimir Yesheyev (URS)	Ma Xiangjun (CHN)	West Germany	Soviet Union		
1989	(Switzerland) Lausanne	Stanislav Zabrodsky (URS)	Kim Soo-Nyung (KOR)	Soviet Union	South Korea		
1991	(Poland) Kraków	Simon Fairweather (AUS)	Kim Soo-Nyung (KOR)	South Korea	South Korea		
1993	(Turkey) Antalya	Park Kyung-Mo (KOR)	Kim Hyo-Jung (KOR)	France	South Korea		
1995	(Indonesia) Jakarta	Lee Kyung-Chul (KOR)	Natalia Valeeva (MDA)	South Korea	South Korea		
1997	(Canada) Victoria	Kim Kyung-Ho (KOR)	Kim Du-Ri (KOR)	South Korea	South Korea		
1999	(France) Riom	Hong Sung-Chil (KOR)	Lee Eun-Kyung (KOR)	Italy	Italy		
2001	(China) Beijing	Yeon Jung-Ki (KOR)	Park Sung-hyun (KOR)	South Korea	China		
2003	(United States) New York	Michele Frangilli (ITA)	Yun Mi-Jin (KOR)	South Korea	South Korea		
2005	(Spain) Madrid	Chung Jae-Hun (KOR)	Lee Sung-Jin (KOR)	South Korea	South Korea		
2007	(Germany) Leipzig	Im Dong-Hyun (KOR)	Natalia Valeeva (ITA)	South Korea	South Korea		
2009	(South Korea) Ulsan	Lee Chang-Hwan (KOR)	Joo Hyun-Jung (KOR)	South Korea	South Korea		
2011	(Italy) Turin	Kim Woo-Jin (KOR)	Denisse van Lamoen (CHI)	South Korea	Italy	South Korea	
2013	(Turkey) Belek	Lee Seung-Yun (KOR)	Maja Jager (DEN)	United States	South Korea	South Korea	
2015	(Denmark) Copenhagen	Kim Woo-Jin (KOR)	Ki Bo-Bae (KOR)	South Korea	Russia	South Korea	
2017	Mexico City	Im Dong-Hyun (KOR)	Ksenia Perova (RUS)	Italy	South Korea	South Korea	
2019	(Netherlands) 's-Hertogenbosch	Brady Ellison (USA)	Lei Chien-ying (TPE)	China	Chinese Taipei	South Korea	
2021	(United States) Yankton	Kim Woo-Jin (KOR)	Jang Min-hee (KOR)	South Korea	South Korea	South Korea	
2023	(Germany) Berlin	Mete Gazoz (TUR)	Marie Horáčková (CZE)	South Korea	Germany	South Korea	
2025	(South Korea) Gwangju	Andrés Temiño (ESP)	Kang Chae-young (KOR)	South Korea	Chinese Taipei	Spain	

Note: ^{1.} Unofficial; ^{2.} Disputed

==== Compound ====
Year	Location	Men's Individual	Women's Individual	Men's Team	Women's Team	Mixed Team	Ref
1995	(Indonesia) Jakarta	Gary Broadhead (USA)	Angela Moscarelli (USA)	France	United States		
1997	(Canada) Victoria	Dee Wilde (USA)	Fabiola Palazzini (ITA)	Hungary	Italy		
1999	(France) Riom	Dave Cousins (USA)	Catherine Pellen (FRA)	United States	Chinese Taipei		
2001	(China) Beijing	Dejan Sitar (SLO)	Ulrika Sjoewall (SWE)	Norway	France		
2003	(United States) New York	Clint Freeman (AUS)	Mary Zorn (USA)	United States	United States		
2005	(Spain) Madrid	Morgan Lundin (SWE)	Sofia Goncharova (RUS)	United States	France		
2007	(Germany) Leipzig	Dietmar Trillus (CAN)	Eugenia Salvi (ITA)	United States	Belgium		
2009	(South Korea) Ulsan	Reo Wilde (USA)	Albina Loginova (RUS)	United States	Russia		
2011	(Italy) Turin	Christopher Perkins (CAN)	Albina Loginova (RUS)	United States	United States	Italy	
2013	(Turkey) Belek	Mike Schloesser (NED)	Kristina Berger (GER)	Denmark	Colombia	Italy	
2015	(Denmark) Copenhagen	Stephan Hansen (DEN)	Kim Yun-hee (KOR)	Iran	Ukraine	South Korea	
2017	Mexico City	Sebastien Peineau (FRA)	Song Yun-soo (KOR)	United States	Colombia	South Korea	
2019	(Netherlands) 's-Hertogenbosch	James Lutz (USA)	Natalia Avdeeva (RUS)	South Korea	Chinese Taipei	South Korea	
2021	(United States) Yankton	Nico Wiener (AUT)	Sara López (COL)	United States	Colombia	Colombia	
2023	(Germany) Berlin	Ojas Pravin Deotale (IND)	Aditi Gopichand Swami (IND)	Poland	India	United States	
2025	(South Korea) Gwangju	Nicolas Girard (FRA)	Andrea Becerra (MEX)	India	Mexico	Netherlands	

== Recurve ==
=== Men's individual ===
Competition format:

- 1933–1955: International long and short rounds (various)
- 1957–1985: FITA round (90m, 70m, 50m, 30m)
- 1987–: Olympic round (set system from 2011)

Championships	Gold	Silver	Bronze
(United Kingdom) 1933 London	Donald MacKenzie (USA)	Emil Heilborn (SWE)	Georges de Rons (BEL)
(Sweden) 1934 Båstad	Henry Kjelsson (SWE)	Emil Heilborn (SWE)	Oscar Kessels (BEL)
(Belgium) 1935 Brussels	Adrien Van Kolen (BEL)	Georges De Rons (BEL)	Frans Walraevens (BEL)
(Czechoslovakia) 1936 Prague	Emil Heilborn (SWE)	Georges De Rons (BEL)	Jan Musilek (TCH)
(France) 1937 Paris	Georges De Rons (BEL)	Feliks Majewski (POL)	Oscar Kessels (BEL)
(United Kingdom) 1938 London	František Hadaš I (TCH)	Feliks Majewski (POL)	C. Smith (GBR)
(Norway) 1939 Oslo	Roger Beday (FRA)	Gaston Questemann (FRA)	A. H. Mole (GBR)
(Sweden) 1946 Stockholm	Einar Tang-Holbeck (DEN)	Hans Deutgen (SWE)	Ove Hansen (DEN)
(Czechoslovakia) 1947 Prague	Hans Deutgen (SWE)	Vaclav Karola (DEN)	Josef Brejcha (TCH)
(United Kingdom) 1948 London	Hans Deutgen (SWE)	Einar Tang-Holbeck (DEN)	Josef Brejcha (TCH)
(France) 1949 Paris	Hans Deutgen (SWE)	František Hadaš I (TCH)	Einar Tang-Holbeck (DEN)
(Denmark) 1950 Copenhagen	Hans Deutgen (SWE)	Einar Tang-Holbeck (DEN)	Russ Reynolds (USA)
(Belgium) 1952 Brussels	Stellan Andersson (SWE)	Bror Lundgren (SWE)	Einar Tang-Holbeck (DEN)
(Norway) 1953 Oslo	Bror Lundgren (SWE)	Einar Tang-Holbek (DEN)	Carl-Eric Bissman (SWE)
(Finland) 1955 Helsinki	Nils Andersson (SWE)	Robert Rhode (USA)	Bertil Olsson (SWE)
(Czechoslovakia) 1957 Prague	O. K. Smathers (USA)	Joe Fries (USA)	Sylvester Chessman (USA)
(Belgium) 1958 Brussels	Stig Thysell (SWE)	Olavi Kallionpaä (FIN)	Roy Matthews (GBR)
(Sweden) 1959 Stockholm	James Caspers (USA)	Robert Kadiee (USA)	James Needey (USA)
(Norway) 1961 Oslo	Joe Thornton (USA)	Clayton Sherman (USA)	Jorma Sandelin (FIN)
(Finland) 1963 Helsinki	Charles Sandlin (USA)	Joe Thornton (USA)	David Keaggy, Jr. (USA)
(Sweden) 1965 Västerås	Matti Haikonen (FIN)	Joe Thornton (USA)	Ben Walker (USA)
(Netherlands) 1967 Amersfoort	Ray Rogers (USA)	Ian Dixon (GBR)	Hardy Ward (USA)
(United States) 1969 Valley Forge	Hardy Ward (USA)	John Williams (USA)	Graeme Telford (AUS)
(United Kingdom) 1971 York	John Williams (USA)	Kyösti Laasonen (FIN)	Wayne Pullen (CAN)
(France) 1973 Grenoble	Victor Sidoruk (URS)	Kyösti Laasonen (FIN)	Stephen Lieberman (USA)
(Switzerland) 1975 Interlaken	Darrell Pace (USA)	Richard McKinney (USA)	Kauko Laasonen (FIN)
(Australia) 1977 Canberra	Richard McKinney (USA)	Takashi Kamei (JPN)	Leandro De Nardi (ITA)
(West Germany) 1979 West Berlin	Darrell Pace (USA)	Richard McKinney (USA)	Rodney Baston (USA)
(Italy) 1981 Punta Ala	Kyosti Laasonen (FIN)	Darrell Pace (USA)	Richard McKinney (USA)
(United States) 1983 Los Angeles	Richard McKinney (USA)	Darrell Pace (USA)	Marnix Vervinck (BEL)
(South Korea) 1985 Seoul	Richard McKinney (USA)	Koo Ja-Chong (KOR)	Takayoshi Matsushita (JPN)
(Australia) 1987 Adelaide	Vladimir Yesheyev (URS)	Andreas Lippoldt (FRG)	Jay Barrs (USA)
(Switzerland) 1989 Lausanne	Stanislav Zabrodsky (URS)	Steven Hallard (GBR)	Tomi Poikolainen (FIN)
(Poland) 1991 Krakow	Simon Fairweather (AUS)	Vadim Shikarev (URS)	Chung Jae-Hun (KOR)
(Turkey) 1993 Antalya	Park Kyung-Mo (KOR)	Kim Kyung-Ho (KOR)	Stanislav Zabrodsky (UKR)
(Indonesia) 1995 Jakarta	Lee Kyung-Chul (KOR)	Wu Tsung-Yi (TPE)	Oh Kyo-Moon (KOR)
(Canada) 1997 Victoria	Kim Kyung-Ho (KOR)	Christophe Peignois (BEL)	Jang Yong-Ho (KOR)
(France) 1999 Riom	Hong Sung-Chil (KOR)	Jari Lipponen (FIN)	Lionel Torres (FRA)
(China) 2001 Beijing	Yeon Jung-Ki (KOR)	Lionel Torres (FRA)	Park Kyung-Mo (KOR)
(United States) 2003 New York	Michele Frangilli (ITA)	Im Dong-Hyun (KOR)	David Barnes (AUS)
(Spain) 2005 Madrid	Chung Jae-Hun (KOR)	Ryuichi Moriya (JPN)	Choi Won-Jong (KOR)
(Germany) 2007 Leipzig	Im Dong-Hyun (KOR)	Baljinima Tsyrempilov (RUS)	Alan Wills (GBR)
(South Korea) 2009 Ulsan	Lee Chang-Hwan (KOR)	Im Dong-Hyun (KOR)	Viktor Ruban (UKR)
(Italy) 2011 Turin	Kim Woo-Jin (KOR)	Oh Jin-Hyek (KOR)	Brady Ellison (USA)
(Turkey) 2013 Belek	Lee Seung-Yun (KOR)	Oh Jin-Hyek (KOR)	Crispin Duenas (CAN)
(Denmark) 2015 Copenhagen	Kim Woo-Jin (KOR)	Rick van der Ven (NED)	Takaharu Furukawa (JPN)
2017 Mexico City	Im Dong-Hyun (KOR)	Wei Chun-heng (TPE)	Steve Wijler (NED)
(Netherlands) 2019 's-Hertogenbosch	Brady Ellison (USA)	Khairul Anuar Mohamad (MAS)	Ruman Shana (BAN)
(United States) 2021 Yankton	Kim Woo-Jin (KOR)	Marcus Vinicius D'Almeida (BRA)	Brady Ellison (USA)
(Germany) 2023 Berlin	Mete Gazoz (TUR)	Eric Peters (CAN)	Marcus Vinicius D'Almeida (BRA)
(South Korea) 2025 Gwangju	Andrés Temiño (ESP)	Marcus Vinicius D'Almeida (BRA)	Kim Je-deok (KOR)

=== Women's individual ===
Competition format:

- 1933–1955: International long and short rounds (various)
- 1957–1985: FITA round (70m, 60m, 50m, 30m)
- 1987–: Olympic round

Championships	Gold	Silver	Bronze
(United Kingdom) 1933 London	Janina Kurkowska (POL)	Louisa Sandford (GBR)	Marja Trajdosowna (POL)
(Sweden) 1934 Båstad	Janina Kurkowska (POL)	Anna Moczulska (POL)	Elsa Waldenström (SWE)
(Belgium) 1935 Brussels	Ina Catani (SWE)	E. Atkinson (GBR)	Janina Kurkowska (POL)
(Czechoslovakia) 1936 Prague	Janina Kurkowska (POL)	Maria Pankow (POL)	Ina Catani (SWE)
(France) 1937 Paris	Erna Simon (GBR)	Irene Crupenninck (FRA)	Zofia Bunsch (POL)
(United Kingdom) 1938 London	Nora Weston-Martyr (GBR); Louise Nettleton (GBR)		Janina Kurkowska (POL)
(Norway) 1939 Oslo	Janina Kurkowska (POL)	Natalia Szczyzinska (POL)	Louise Nettleton (GBR)
(Sweden) 1946 Stockholm	Petronella de Wharton-Burr (GBR)	Julia Stranne (SWE)	Louise Nettleton (GBR)
(Czechoslovakia) 1947 Prague	Janina Kurkowska (POL)	Astrid Trølsen (DEN)	Petronella de Wharton-Burr (GBR)
(United Kingdom) 1948 London	Petronella de Wharton-Burr (GBR)	Dana Picková (TCH)	Helena Sachová (TCH)
(France) 1949 Paris	Barbara Waterhouse (GBR)	Ragnhild Windahl (SWE)	Trogie Fisher (GBR)
(Denmark) 1950 Copenhagen	Jean Lee (USA)	Jean Richards (USA)	Ragnhild Windahl (SWE)
(Belgium) 1952 Brussels	Jean Lee (USA)	Jean Richards (USA)	Dorothy Hinton (GBR)
(Norway) 1953 Oslo	Jean Richards (USA)	Ilta-Meri Santaoja (FIN)	Jacqueline Lang (FRA)
(Finland) 1955 Helsinki	Katarzyna Wisniowska (POL)	Joyce Warner (GBR)	Impi Hartikainen (FIN)
(Czechoslovakia) 1957 Prague	Carole Meinhart (USA)	Ann Clark (USA)	Betty Schmidt (USA)
(Belgium) 1958 Brussels	Sigrid Johansson (SWE)	Ann Corby (USA)	Carole Meinhart (USA)
(Sweden) 1959 Stockholm	Ann Corby (USA)	Sigrid Johansson (SWE)	Lucille Shine (USA)
(Norway) 1961 Oslo	Nancy Vonderheide (USA)	Laurie Fowler (GBR)	Bozena Deptova (TCH)
(Finland) 1963 Helsinki	Victoria Cook (USA)	Nancy Vonderheide (USA)	Marjatta Niemi (FIN)
(Sweden) 1965 Västerås	Maire Lindholm (FIN)	Anita Schlebusch (SAF)	Juliette Rijff (SAF)
(Netherlands) 1967 Amersfoort	Maria Mączyńska (POL)	Zofia Piskorek (POL)	Irena Szadlowska (POL)
(United States) 1969 Valley Forge	Dorothy Lidstone (CAN)	Doreen Wilber (USA)	Nina Kozina (URS)
(United Kingdom) 1971 York	Emma Gapchenko (URS)	Doreen Wilber (USA)	Maria Mączyńska (POL)
(France) 1973 Grenoble	Linda Myers (USA)	Valentina Kovpan (URS)	Emma Gapchenko (URS)
(Switzerland) 1975 Interlaken	Zebiniso Rustamova (URS)	Valentina Kovpan (URS)	Han Sun-Hi (PRK)
(Australia) 1977 Canberra	Luann Ryon (USA)	Jadwiga Wilejto (POL)	Irene Daubenspeck (USA)
(West Germany) 1979 West Berlin	Kim Jin-Ho (KOR)	Judi Adams (USA)	Carole Mary Toy (AUS)
(Italy) 1981 Punta Ala	Natalya Butuzova (URS)	Alicija Ciskowska (POL)	Marilyn Rumley (AUS)
(United States) 1983 Los Angeles	Kim Jin-Ho (KOR)	Jung Jea-Bong (KOR)	Liselotte Andersson (SWE)
(South Korea) 1985 Seoul	Irina Soldatova (URS)	Liudmila Arzhanikova (URS)	Kim Jin-Ho (KOR)
(Australia) 1987 Adelaide	Ma Xiangjun (CHN)	Wang Hee-Kyung (KOR)	Yao Yawen (CHN)
(Switzerland) 1989 Lausanne	Kim Soo-Nyung (KOR)	Kim Kyung-Woog (KOR)	Denise Parker (USA)
(Poland) 1991 Krakow	Kim Soo-Nyung (KOR)	Lee Eun-Kyung (KOR)	Zehra Oktem (TUR)
(Turkey) 1993 Antalya	Kim Hyo-Jung (KOR)	Cho Youn-Jeong (KOR)	Yana Tunyantse (KAZ)
(Indonesia) 1995 Jakarta	Natalia Valeeva (MDA)	Barbara Mensing (GER)	Yoom Yoon-Ja (KOR)
(Canada) 1997 Victoria	Kim Du-Ri (KOR)	Cornelia Pfohl (GER)	Kim Jo-Sun (KOR)
(France) 1999 Riom	Lee Eun-Kyung (KOR)	Alison Williamson (GBR)	Kim Jo-Sun (KOR)
(China) 2001 Beijing	Park Sung-hyun (KOR)	Kim Kyung-Wook (KOR)	Kateryna Palekha (UKR)
(United States) 2003 New York	Yun Mi-Jin (KOR)	Park Sung-hyun (KOR)	Lee Hyun-Jeong (KOR)
(Spain) 2005 Madrid	Lee Sung-Jin (KOR)	Lee Tuk-Young (KOR)	Park Sung-hyun (KOR)
(Germany) 2007 Leipzig	Natalia Valeeva (ITA)	Park Sung-hyun (KOR)	Natalya Erdyniyeva (RUS)
(South Korea) 2009 Ulsan	Joo Hyun-Jung (KOR)	Kwak Ye-Ji (KOR)	Natalia Sánchez (COL)
(Italy) 2011 Turin	Denisse van Lamoen (CHI)	Kristine Esebua (GEO)	Fang Yuting (CHN)
(Turkey) 2013 Belek	Maja Jager (DEN)	Xu Jing (CHN)	Yun Ok-Hee (KOR)
(Denmark) 2015 Copenhagen	Ki Bo-Bae (KOR)	Lin Shih-chia (TPE)	Choi Mi-Sun (KOR)
2017 Mexico City	Ksenia Perova (RUS)	Chang Hye-Jin (KOR)	Tan Ya-ting (TPE)
(Netherlands) 2019 's-Hertogenbosch	Lei Chien-ying (TPE)	Kang Chae-young (KOR)	Choi Mi-Sun (KOR)
(United States) 2021 Yankton	Jang Min-hee (KOR)	Casey Kaufhold (USA)	An San (KOR)
(Germany) 2023 Berlin	Marie Horáčková (CZE)	Alejandra Valencia (MEX)	Satsuki Noda (JPN)
(South Korea) 2025 Gwangju	Kang Chae-young (KOR)	Zhu Jingyi (CHN)	An San (KOR)

=== Men's team ===
Competition format:

- 1933–1955: International long and short rounds (various), cumulative total of leading archers per country (1933–36 unofficial)
- 1957–1985: FITA round (90m, 70m, 50m, 30m), cumulative total of leading archers per country
- 1987–: Olympic round

Championships	Gold	Silver	Bronze
(United Kingdom) 1933 London	Belgium	Great Britain	France
(Sweden) 1934 Båstad	Sweden	Belgium	Czechoslovakia
(Belgium) 1935 Brussels	Czechoslovakia	Belgium	Sweden
(Czechoslovakia) 1936 Prague	Czechoslovakia	Belgium	Sweden
(France) 1937 Paris	Poland	Belgium	Sweden
(United Kingdom) 1938 London	Czechoslovakia	Poland	France
(Norway) 1939 Oslo	France	Great Britain	Sweden
(Sweden) 1946 Stockholm	Denmark	Czechoslovakia	France
(Czechoslovakia) 1947 Prague	Czechoslovakia	Denmark	Sweden
(United Kingdom) 1948 London	Sweden	Denmark	Czechoslovakia
(France) 1949 Paris	Czechoslovakia	Sweden	Denmark
(Denmark) 1950 Copenhagen	Denmark	Sweden	Czechoslovakia
(Belgium) 1952 Brussels	Sweden	Denmark	Great Britain
(Norway) 1953 Oslo	Sweden	Denmark	Belgium
(Finland) 1955 Helsinki	Sweden	Finland	Belgium
(Czechoslovakia) 1957 Prague	United States	Sweden	Finland
(Belgium) 1958 Brussels	Finland	Sweden	United States
(Sweden) 1959 Stockholm	United States	Belgium	Sweden
(Norway) 1961 Oslo	United States	Belgium	Finland
(Finland) 1963 Helsinki	United States	France	Sweden
(Sweden) 1965 Västerås	United States	Finland	Sweden
(Netherlands) 1967 Amersfoort	United States	Sweden	Great Britain
(United States) 1969 Valley Forge	United States	Denmark	Great Britain
(United Kingdom) 1971 York	United States	Finland	Canada
(France) 1973 Grenoble	United States	Soviet Union	Finland
(Switzerland) 1975 Interlaken	United States	Japan	Finland
(Australia) 1977 Canberra	United States	Italy	Japan
(West Germany) 1979 West Berlin	United States	West Germany	Belgium
(Italy) 1981 Punta Ala	United States	Finland	Soviet Union
(United States) 1983 Los Angeles	United States	South Korea	Belgium
(South Korea) 1985 Seoul	South Korea	United States	Sweden
(Australia) 1987 Adelaide	West Germany	United States	China
(Switzerland) 1989 Lausanne	Soviet Union	United States	South Korea
(Poland) 1991 Krakow	South Korea	Soviet Union	United States
(Turkey) 1993 Antalya	France	South Korea	Netherlands
(Indonesia) 1995 Jakarta	South Korea	Italy	United States
(Canada) 1997 Victoria	South Korea	Norway	Russia
(France) 1999 Riom	Italy	South Korea	United States
(China) 2001 Beijing	South Korea	Italy	China
(United States) 2003 New York	South Korea	Sweden	Italy
(Spain) 2005 Madrid	South Korea	India	Poland
(Germany) 2007 Leipzig	South Korea	Great Britain	Chinese Taipei
(South Korea) 2009 Ulsan	South Korea	France	Japan
(Italy) 2011 Turin	South Korea	France	Italy
(Turkey) 2013 Belek	United States	Netherlands	France
(Denmark) 2015 Copenhagen	South Korea	Italy	Chinese Taipei
2017 Mexico City	Italy	France	South Korea
(Netherlands) 2019 's-Hertogenbosch	China	India	South Korea
(United States) 2021 Yankton	South Korea	United States	Chinese Taipei
(Germany) 2023 Berlin	South Korea	Turkey	Japan
(South Korea) 2025 Gwangju	South Korea	United States	Japan

=== Women's team ===
Competition format:

- 1933–1955: International long and short rounds (various), cumulative total of leading archers per country (1933–36 unofficial)
- 1957–1985: FITA round (90m, 70m, 50m, 30m), cumulative total of leading archers per country
- 1987–: Olympic round

Championships	Gold	Silver	Bronze
(United Kingdom) 1933 London	Poland	Great Britain	
(Sweden) 1934 Båstad	Poland	Sweden	
(Belgium) 1935 Brussels	Great Britain	Sweden	Poland
(Czechoslovakia) 1936 Prague	Poland	Czechoslovakia	United Kingdom
(France) 1937 Paris	Great Britain	Poland	France
(United Kingdom) 1938 London	Poland	Great Britain	Sweden
(Norway) 1939 Oslo	Poland	Great Britain	Sweden
(Sweden) 1946 Stockholm	Great Britain	Sweden	
(Czechoslovakia) 1947 Prague	Denmark	France	Great Britain
(United Kingdom) 1948 London	Czechoslovakia	Great Britain	Denmark
(France) 1949 Paris	Great Britain	Sweden	France
(Denmark) 1950 Copenhagen	Finland	Sweden	Great Britain
(Belgium) 1952 Brussels	United States	Great Britain	Sweden
(Norway) 1953 Oslo	Finland	France	Sweden
(Finland) 1955 Helsinki	Great Britain	Finland	Poland
(Czechoslovakia) 1957 Prague	United States	Czechoslovakia	Great Britain
(Belgium) 1958 Brussels	United States	Czechoslovakia	South Africa
(Sweden) 1959 Stockholm	United States	Great Britain	Czechoslovakia
(Norway) 1961 Oslo	United States	Great Britain	South Africa
(Finland) 1963 Helsinki	United States	Finland	Great Britain
(Sweden) 1965 Västerås	United States	Finland	Great Britain
(Netherlands) 1967 Amersfoort	Poland	United States	Sweden
(United States) 1969 Valley Forge	Soviet Union	Canada	Poland
(United Kingdom) 1971 York	Poland	Soviet Union	United States
(France) 1973 Grenoble	Soviet Union	United States	Great Britain
(Switzerland) 1975 Interlaken	Soviet Union	North Korea	United States
(Australia) 1977 Canberra	United States	Soviet Union	Australia
(West Germany) 1979 West Berlin	South Korea	Australia	Great Britain
(Italy) 1981 Punta Ala	Soviet Union	South Korea	China
(United States) 1983 Los Angeles	South Korea	West Germany	United States
(South Korea) 1985 Seoul	Soviet Union	South Korea	West Germany
(Australia) 1987 Adelaide	Soviet Union	South Korea	France
(Switzerland) 1989 Lausanne	South Korea	Sweden	Soviet Union
(Poland) 1991 Krakow	South Korea	Soviet Union	Sweden
(Turkey) 1993 Antalya	South Korea	Russia	China
(Indonesia) 1995 Jakarta	South Korea	Turkey	Indonesia
(Canada) 1997 Victoria	South Korea	Ukraine	Turkey
(France) 1999 Riom	Italy	China	Germany
(China) 2001 Beijing	China	Italy	South Korea
(United States) 2003 New York	South Korea	Japan	Ukraine
(Spain) 2005 Madrid	South Korea	Ukraine	Russia
(Germany) 2007 Leipzig	South Korea	Chinese Taipei	Great Britain
(South Korea) 2009 Ulsan	South Korea	Japan	Russia
(Italy) 2011 Turin	Italy	India	South Korea
(Turkey) 2013 Belek	South Korea	Belarus	Denmark
(Denmark) 2015 Copenhagen	Russia	India	South Korea
2017 Mexico City	South Korea	Mexico	Chinese Taipei
(Netherlands) 2019 's-Hertogenbosch	Chinese Taipei	South Korea	Great Britain
(United States) 2021 Yankton	South Korea	Mexico	France
(Germany) 2023 Berlin	Germany	France	Mexico
(South Korea) 2025 Gwangju	Chinese Taipei	Japan	South Korea

=== Mixed team (2011–) ===
Competition format:

- 2011–: Olympic round

Championships	Gold	Silver	Bronze
(Italy) 2011 Turin	South Korea	Mexico	Great Britain
(Turkey) 2013 Belek	South Korea	United States	Chinese Taipei
(Denmark) 2015 Copenhagen	South Korea	Chinese Taipei	China
2017 Mexico City	South Korea	Germany	Great Britain
(Netherlands) 2019 's-Hertogenbosch	South Korea	Netherlands	Italy
(United States) 2021 Yankton	South Korea	Russian Archery Federation	Turkey
(Germany) 2023 Berlin	South Korea	Germany	Italy
(South Korea) 2025 Gwangju	Spain	South Korea	Japan

=== Mixed individual ===
Championships	Gold	Silver	Bronze
(Poland) 1931 Lwów	Michal Sawicki (POL)	Janina Kurkowska (POL)	Rene Allexandre (FRA)
(Poland) 1932 Warsaw	Laurent Reth (BEL)	Zbigniew Kosinski (POL)	Janina Kurkowska (POL)

=== Mixed team (1931–32) ===
- The mixed team event was an unofficial event

Championships	Gold	Silver	Bronze
(Poland) 1931 Lwów	France men	Poland men	Poland women
(Poland) 1932 Warsaw	Poland men	Poland women	France men

== Compound ==
=== Men's individual ===
Championships	Gold	Silver	Bronze
(Indonesia) 1995 Jakarta	Gary Broadhead (USA)	John Vozzy (USA)	Phillip Tremelling (AUS)
(Canada) 1997 Victoria	Dee Wilde (USA)	Terry Ragsdale (USA)	Clint Freeman (AUS)
(France) 1999 Riom	Dave Cousins (USA)	Stephen Gooden (GBR)	Tibor Ondrik (HUN)
(China) 2001 Beijing	Dejan Sitar (SLO)	Morgan Lundin (SWE)	Morten Boe (NOR)
(United States) 2003 New York	Clint Freeman (AUS)	Dave Cousins (USA)	Braden Gellenthien (USA)
(Spain) 2005 Madrid	Morgan Lundin (SWE)	Morten Boe (NOR)	Dejan Sitar (SLO)
(Germany) 2007 Leipzig	Dietmar Trillus (CAN)	Braden Gellenthien (USA)	Martin Damsbo (DEN)
(South Korea) 2009 Ulsan	Reo Wilde (USA)	Liam Grimwood (GBR)	Stephen Clifton (NZL)
(Italy) 2011 Turin	Christopher Perkins (CAN)	Jesse Broadwater (USA)	Reo Wilde (USA)
(Turkey) 2013 Belek	Mike Schloesser (NED)	Pierre Julien Deloche (FRA)	Alexander Dambaev (RUS)
(Denmark) 2015 Copenhagen	Stephan Hansen (DEN)	Rajat Chauhan (IND)	Adam Ravenscroft (GBR)
2017 Mexico City	Sebastien Peineau (FRA)	Stephan Hansen (DEN)	Braden Gellenthien (USA)
(Netherlands) 2019 's-Hertogenbosch	James Lutz (USA)	Anders Faugstad (NOR)	Kim Jong-ho (KOR)
(United States) 2021 Yankton	Nico Wiener (AUT)	Mike Schloesser (NED)	Robin Jäätma (EST)
(Germany) 2023 Berlin	Ojas Pravin Deotale (IND)	Łukasz Przybylski (POL)	Mike Schloesser (NED)
(South Korea) 2025 Gwangju	Nicolas Girard (FRA)	Mathias Fullerton (DEN)	Choi Yong-hee (KOR)

=== Women's individual ===
Championships	Gold	Silver	Bronze
(Indonesia) 1995 Jakarta	Angela Moscarelli (USA)	Petra Ericsson (SWE)	Inga Low (USA)
(Canada) 1997 Victoria	Fabiola Palazzini (ITA)	Catherine Pellen (FRA)	Jamie van Natta (USA)
(France) 1999 Riom	Catherine Pellen (FRA)	Shih Ya-Ping (TPE)	Fabiola Palazzini (ITA)
(China) 2001 Beijing	Ulrika Sjoewall (SWE)	Bettina Thiele (GER)	Sirkka Sokka-Matikainen (FIN)
(United States) 2003 New York	Mary Zorn (USA)	Amber Dawson (USA)	Irma Luyting (NED)
(Spain) 2005 Madrid	Sofia Goncharova (RUS)	Arminda Bastos (MEX)	Svetlana Kondrashenko (RUS)
(Germany) 2007 Leipzig	Eugenia Salvi (ITA)	Albina Loginova (RUS)	Amandine Bouillot (FRA)
(South Korea) 2009 Ulsan	Albina Loginova (RUS)	Jorina Coetzee (RSA)	Laura Longo (ITA)
(Italy) 2011 Turin	Albina Loginova (RUS)	Pascale Lebecque (FRA)	Erika Anschutz (USA)
(Turkey) 2013 Belek	Kristina Berger (GER)	Ivana Buden (CRO)	Gerda Roux (RSA)
(Denmark) 2015 Copenhagen	Kim Yun-hee (KOR)	Crystal Gauvin (USA)	Sara López (COL)
2017 Mexico City	Song Yun-Soo (KOR)	Yeşim Bostan (TUR)	Kristina Berger (GER)
(Netherlands) 2019 's-Hertogenbosch	Natalia Avdeeva (RUS)	Paige Pearce (USA)	Jyothi Surekha Vennam (IND)
(United States) 2021 Yankton	Sara López (COL)	Jyothi Surekha Vennam (IND)	Andrea Becerra (MEX)
(Germany) 2023 Berlin	Aditi Gopichand Swami (IND)	Andrea Becerra (MEX)	Jyothi Surekha Vennam (IND)
(South Korea) 2025 Gwangju	Andrea Becerra (MEX)	Sofía Paiz (ESA)	Alejandra Usquiano (COL)

=== Men's team ===
Championships	Gold	Silver	Bronze
(Indonesia) 1995 Jakarta	France	United States	Australia
(Canada) 1997 Victoria	Hungary	Spain	Canada
(France) 1999 Riom	United States	Hungary	Great Britain
(China) 2001 Beijing	Norway	Germany	Great Britain
(United States) 2003 New York	United States	Italy	Canada
(Spain) 2005 Madrid	United States	Norway	Australia
(Germany) 2007 Leipzig	United States	Australia	Sweden
(South Korea) 2009 Ulsan	United States	Russia	El Salvador
(Italy) 2011 Turin	United States	Denmark	Canada
(Turkey) 2013 Belek	Denmark	South Africa	France
(Denmark) 2015 Copenhagen	Iran	Canada	Denmark
2017 Mexico City	United States	Italy	Colombia
(Netherlands) 2019 's-Hertogenbosch	South Korea	Turkey	Netherlands
(United States) 2021 Yankton	United States	Mexico	Austria
(Germany) 2023 Berlin	Poland	Denmark	Netherlands
(South Korea) 2025 Gwangju	India	France	Slovenia

=== Women's team ===
Championships	Gold	Silver	Bronze
(Indonesia) 1995 Jakarta	United States	Sweden	Italy
(Canada) 1997 Victoria	Italy	United States	France
(France) 1999 Riom	Chinese Taipei	Netherlands	Germany
(China) 2001 Beijing	France	Italy	Netherlands
(United States) 2003 New York	United States	France	Germany
(Spain) 2005 Madrid	France	United States	Denmark
(Germany) 2007 Leipzig	Belgium	Italy	United States
(South Korea) 2009 Ulsan	Russia	South Korea	United States
(Italy) 2011 Turin	United States	Iran	Venezuela
(Turkey) 2013 Belek	Colombia	Netherlands	France
(Denmark) 2015 Copenhagen	Ukraine	Netherlands	South Korea
2017 Mexico City	Colombia	India	South Korea
(Netherlands) 2019 's-Hertogenbosch	Chinese Taipei	United States	India
(United States) 2021 Yankton	Colombia	India	United States
(Germany) 2023 Berlin	India	Mexico	South Korea
(South Korea) 2025 Gwangju	Mexico	United States	Kazakhstan

=== Mixed team (2011–) ===
Championships	Gold	Silver	Bronze
(Italy) 2011 Turin	Italy	Netherlands	South Korea
(Turkey) 2013 Belek	Italy	Russia	United States
(Denmark) 2015 Copenhagen	South Korea	France	South Africa
2017 Mexico City	South Korea	Germany	Italy
(Netherlands) 2019 's-Hertogenbosch	South Korea	France	Chinese Taipei
(United States) 2021 Yankton	Colombia	India	South Korea
(Germany) 2023 Berlin	United States	Colombia	Luxembourg
(South Korea) 2025 Gwangju	Netherlands	India	Mexico

== All-time medal table (1931–2025) ==
Including medals earned in the unofficial team events in 1931–1936

Rank	Nation	Gold	Silver	Bronze	Total
1	South Korea	68	27	31	126
2	United States	65	41	34	140
3	Sweden	19	22	23	64
4	Poland	18	16	12	46
5	Soviet Union	14	9	4	27
6	Great Britain	11	19	26	56
7	Italy	11	9	9	29
8	France	10	17	16	43
9	Denmark	7	14	9	30
10	Czechoslovakia	7	5	9	21
11	Russia	7	5	6	18
12	Finland	6	12	10	28
13	Belgium	5	9	9	23
14	Chinese Taipei	5	6	7	18
15	Colombia	5	1	4	10
16	India	4	10	3	17
17	China	3	3	7	13
18	Canada	3	3	6	12
19	Netherlands	2	8	7	17
20	Mexico	2	8	3	13
21	Germany	2	7	4	13
22	Australia	2	2	9	13
23	Spain	2	1	0	3
24	Turkey	1	4	3	8
25	Norway	1	4	1	6
26	West Germany	1	3	1	5
27	Ukraine	1	2	4	7
28	Hungary	1	1	1	3
29	Iran	1	1	0	2
30	Slovenia	1	0	2	3
31	Austria	1	0	1	2
32	Chile	1	0	0	1
32	Czech Republic	1	0	0	1
32	Moldova	1	0	0	1
35	Japan	0	6	8	14
36	South Africa	0	3	5	8
37	Brazil	0	2	1	3
38	El Salvador	0	1	1	2
38	North Korea	0	1	1	2
40	Belarus	0	1	0	1
40	Croatia	0	1	0	1
40	Georgia	0	1	0	1
40	Malaysia	0	1	0	1
40	Russian Archery Federation	0	1	0	1
45	Kazakhstan	0	0	2	2
46	Bangladesh	0	0	1	1
46	Estonia	0	0	1	1
46	Indonesia	0	0	1	1
46	Luxembourg	0	0	1	1
46	New Zealand	0	0	1	1
46	Venezuela	0	0	1	1
Totals (51 entries)		289	287	285	861

== See also ==
- List of Olympic medalists in archery
- Archery World Cup
