= 1971 World Archery Championships =

- Location: York, Great Britain
- Start date: 18 July
- End date: 31 July
- Competitors: 177

The 1971 World Archery Championships was the 26th edition of the event. It was held in York, Great Britain on 18–31 July 1971 and was organised by World Archery Federation (FITA). The championships marked the last competition before archery became an Olympic sport in 1972.

== Medals summary ==
=== Recurve ===
Event	Gold	Silver	Bronze
Men's individual	John Williams; United States	Kyösti Laasonen; Finland	Wayne Pullen; Canada
Women's individual	Emma Gapchenko; Soviet Union	Doreen Wilber; United States	Maria Mączyńska; Poland
Men's team	United States; John Williams; Edwin Murray Eliason; Larry Smith	Finland; Kyösti Laasonen; K. Kyllonen; Jorma Sandelin	Canada; Wayne Pullen; Donald Jackson; Larry Courchaine
Women's team	Poland; Maria Mączyńska; Jadwiga Szoszler-Wilejto; Irena Szydłowska	Soviet Union; Emma Gapchenko; N. Lonskay; Wirwe Holtsmeier	United States; Doreen Wilber; Victoria Cook; Nancy Myrick

== Medals table ==
Rank	Nation	Gold	Silver	Bronze	Total
1	United States	2	1	1	4
2	Soviet Union	1	1	0	2
3	Poland	1	0	1	2
4	Finland	0	2	0	2
5	Canada	0	0	2	2
Totals (5 entries)		4	4	4	12
