= 1969 World Archery Championships =

Archery championships

- Location: Valley Forge, United States
- Start date: 11 August
- End date: 20 August
- Competitors: 153

The 1969 World Archery Championships was the 25th edition of the event. It was held in Valley Forge National Historical Park, United States on 11–20 August 1969 and was organised by World Archery Federation (FITA).

This was the first time the event was held outside of Europe, and was held alongside the inaugural World Field Archery Championships. It was also the first event which saw representation from the Soviet Union.

== Medals summary ==
=== Recurve ===
Event	Gold	Silver	Bronze
Men's individual	Hardy Ward; United States	John Williams; United States	Graeme Telford; Australia
Women's individual	Dorothy Lidstone; Canada	Doreen Wilber; United States	Nina Kozina; Soviet Union
Men's team	United States	Denmark	United Kingdom
Women's team	Soviet Union	Canada	Poland

== Medals table ==
Rank	Nation	Gold	Silver	Bronze	Total
1	United States	2	2	0	4
2	Canada	1	1	0	2
3	Soviet Union	1	0	1	2
4	Denmark	0	1	0	1
5	Australia	0	0	1	1
5	Great Britain	0	0	1	1
5	Poland	0	0	1	1
Totals (7 entries)		4	4	4	12
