= Janina Kurkowska-Spychajowa =

Polish archer (1901–1979)

Medal record

Women's Archery

Representing Poland

World Championships
Gold medal – first place	1933 London	Individual
Gold medal – first place	1933 London	Team
Gold medal – first place	1934 Båstad	Individual
Gold medal – first place	1934 Båstad	Team
Gold medal – first place	1936 Prague	Individual
Gold medal – first place	1938 London	Team
Gold medal – first place	1939 Oslo	Individual
Gold medal – first place	1939 Oslo	Team
Gold medal – first place	1947 Prague	Individual
Silver medal – second place	1931 Lwów	Individual
Silver medal – second place	1932 Warsaw	Team
Silver medal – second place	1936 Prague	Team
Silver medal – second place	1937 Paris	Team
Bronze medal – third place	1931 Lwów	Team
Bronze medal – third place	1932 Warsaw	Individual
Bronze medal – third place	1935 Brussels	Individual
Bronze medal – third place	1935 Brussels	Team
Bronze medal – third place	1938 London	Individual
Bronze medal – third place	1955 Helsinki	Team

Janina Kurkowska-Spychajowa (February 8, 1901 in Starosielce – June 6, 1979) was a Polish archer. With an unprecedented five overall FITA Outdoor Archery World Championships titles (1933, 1934, 1936, 1939, and 1947), Kurkowska-Spychajowa is the most decorated archer at the World Championships. Her medal haul at the World Championships level spanned 24 years, from 1931 when she won a (mixed) individual silver medal in the inaugural World Championships until 1955 when she helped Poland to win a ladies' team bronze medal.
