= O. K. Smathers =

American archer (1914–1997)

Personal information
- Full name: Oswald Smathers
- Born: August 26, 1914 Asheville, North Carolina, U.S.
- Died: May 5, 1997 (aged 82) Brevard, North Carolina, U.S.

Sport
- Sport: Archery
- Event: Recurve
Medal record
Men's archery
Representing the United States
World Championships
Gold medal – first place	1957 Prague	Individual
Gold medal – first place	1957 Prague	Team
Bronze medal – third place	1958 Brussels	Team

Oswald "O.K." Smathers (August 26, 1914 – May 5, 1997) was a national and World Champion archer who represented the United States.

== Career ==
Smathers was not selected for the United States representation at the 1957 World Archery Championships in Prague, Czechoslovakia, which was the first championships to which the US sent a full team, but paid his own expenses to attend. He went on to win the men's championships in the most successful ever World Archery Championships for the United States, winning all three medals in both men's and women's competitions and both team championships, a record that has not been matched since. Smathers became the first US world champion since Donald MacKenzie in 1933. He competed again in 1958 and 1959, finishing 16th and 6th respectively.

After winning the World Championships, Smathers as well as his daughter and son appeared on game show I've Got A Secret as a celebrity guests, along with his family. His daughter Lynne and son Ken were also archery champions; both won national championships the same year their father won the world championships, 1957. Ken won the North Carolina state championships in 1961.
