= 1967 World Archery Championships =

Archery championships

- Location: Amersfoort, Netherlands
- Start date: 25 July
- End date: 28 July
- Competitors: 185

The 1967 World Archery Championships was the 24th edition of the event. It was held in Amersfoort, Netherlands on 25–28 July 1967 and was organised by World Archery Federation (FITA).

== Medals summary ==
=== Recurve ===
Event	Gold	Silver	Bronze
Men's individual	Ray Rogers; United States	Ian Dixon; Great Britain	Hardy Ward; United States
Women's individual	Maria Mączyńska; Poland	Zofia Piskorek; Poland	Irena Szydlowska; Poland
Men's team	United States	Sweden	United Kingdom
Women's team	Poland	United States	Sweden

== Medals table ==
Rank	Nation	Gold	Silver	Bronze	Total
1	Poland	2	1	1	4
1	United States	2	1	1	4
3	Great Britain	0	1	1	2
3	Sweden	0	1	1	2
Totals (4 entries)		4	4	4	12
