= 1936 World Archery Championships =

- Location: Prague, Czechoslovakia
- Start date: 13 August
- End date: 17 August
- Competitors: 62

The 1936 World Archery Championships was the 6th edition of the event. It was held in Prague, Czechoslovakia on 13–17 August 1936 and was organised by World Archery Federation (FITA).

== Medals summary ==
=== Recurve ===
Event	Gold	Silver	Bronze
Men's individual	Emil Heilborn; Sweden	Georges De Rons; Belgium	Jan Musilek; Czechoslovakia
Women's individual	Janina Kurkowska; Poland	Maria Pankow; Poland	Ina Catani; Sweden
Men's team	Czechoslovakia	Poland	Sweden
Women's team	Poland	Czechoslovakia	United Kingdom

== Medals table ==
Rank	Nation	Gold	Silver	Bronze	Total
1	Poland	2	2	0	4
2	Czechoslovakia	1	1	1	3
3	Sweden	1	0	2	3
4	Belgium	0	1	0	1
5	Great Britain	0	0	1	1
Totals (5 entries)		4	4	4	12
