= Lidstone (surname) =

Lidstone is a surname. Notable people with the surname include:

- Dorothy Lidstone (born 1938), Canadian archer
- George James Lidstone (1870–1952), British actuary
