= 1946 World Archery Championships =

- Location: Stockholm, Sweden
- Start date: 6 August
- End date: 11 August
- Competitors: 66

The 1946 World Archery Championships was the 10th edition of the event. It was held in Stockholm, Sweden on 6–11 August 1946 and was organised by World Archery Federation (FITA).

Due to the Second World War, this was the first edition of World Championships since 1939.

== Medals summary ==
=== Recurve ===
Event	Gold	Silver	Bronze
Men's individual	Einar Tang-Holbeck; Denmark	Hans Deutgen; Sweden	Ove Hansen; Denmark
Women's individual	Petronella de Wharton-Burr; Great Britain	Julia Stranne; Sweden	Louise Nettleton; Great Britain
Men's team	Denmark	Czechoslovakia	France
Women's team	United Kingdom	Sweden	—

== Medals table ==
Rank	Nation	Gold	Silver	Bronze	Total
1	Denmark	2	0	1	3
1	Great Britain	2	0	1	3
3	Sweden	0	3	0	3
4	Czechoslovakia	0	1	0	1
5	France	0	0	1	1
Totals (5 entries)		4	4	3	11
