= 1957 World Archery Championships =

- Location: Prague, Czechoslovakia
- Start date: 18 July
- End date: 21 July
- Competitors: 88

The 1957 World Archery Championships was the 18th edition of the event. It was held in Prague, Czechoslovakia on 18–21 July 1957 and was organised by World Archery Federation (FITA).

All individual medals were won by archers from the United States. It also marked the first Championship where archers from one country won all events, a feat the United States went on to repeat in 1959, 1961, and 1963.

== Medals summary ==
=== Recurve ===
Event	Gold	Silver	Bronze
Men's individual	O. K. Smathers; United States	Joe Fries; United States	Sylvester Chessman; United States
Women's individual	Carole Meinhart; United States	Ann Clark; United States	Betty Schmidt; United States
Men's team	United States	Sweden	Finland
Women's team	United States	Czechoslovakia	United Kingdom

== Medals table ==
Rank	Nation	Gold	Silver	Bronze	Total
1	United States	4	2	2	8
2	Czechoslovakia	0	1	0	1
2	Sweden	0	1	0	1
4	Finland	0	0	1	1
4	Great Britain	0	0	1	1
Totals (5 entries)		4	4	4	12
