= Dorothy Lidstone =

Canadian archer

Personal information
- Born: Dorothy Wagar; November 2, 1938 Wetaskiwin, Alberta, Canada
- Died: March 2, 2025 (aged 86) Summerland, British Columbia, Canada

Sport
- Sport: Archery
Medal record
Women's archery
Representing Canada
World Championships
Gold medal – first place	1969 Valley Forge	Individual
Silver medal – second place	1969 Valley Forge	Team

Dorothy Lidstone (November 2, 1938 – March 2, 2025) was a former World Champion archer who represented Canada.

== Career ==
Lidstone joined an archery club after moving to North Vancouver with her husband in 1962. She was first selected to represent Canada at the 1965 World Archery Championships, later becoming world champion by winning the 1969 World Archery Championships in Valley Forge, Pennsylvania, while also winning gold at the national championships in 1969, 1970 and 1971. She was unable to compete in the 1972 Olympics, the first to feature archery since 1920, due to a conflict with her job in a bakery.

Lidstone was elected to the Canadian Sports Hall of Fame in 1970, and retired from competition in 1975. The annual Archery Canada award for female athlete of the year is named after her.
