= Kyösti Laasonen =

Finnish archer (born 1945)

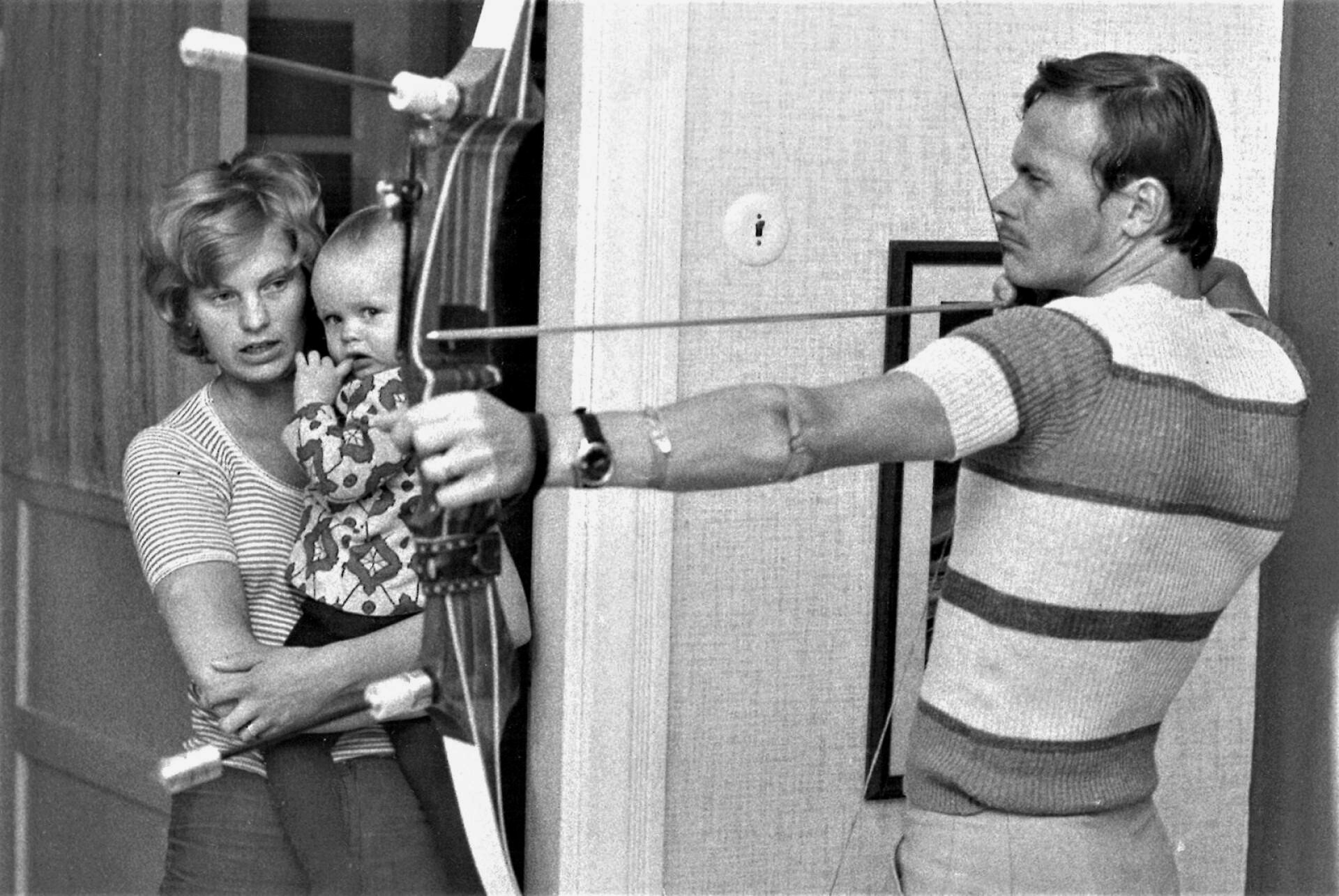
- 1972

Medal record

Men's Archery

Representing Finland

Olympic Games
Bronze medal – third place	1972 Munich	Individual

World Championships
Gold medal – first place	1981 Punta Ala	Individual
Silver medal – second place	1981 Punta Ala	Team

European Championships
Gold medal – first place	1968 Reutte	Recurve
Gold medal – first place	1978 Reutte	Recurve

Kyösti Kalevi Laasonen (born 27 September 1945) is an archer from Finland, who was born in Kitee, Finland.

== Career ==
Laasonen competed for Finland in the 1972 Summer Olympics held in Munich, Germany in the individual event where he finished in third place behind American John Williams and Sweden's Gunnar Jervill. Four years later he finished 15th at the 1976 Summer Olympics held in Montreal, Quebec, Canada followed by 7th and 28th in the 1980 Summer Olympics and 1984 Summer Olympics respectively.

His brother Kauko Laasonen also competed in the 1976 Summer Olympics finishing in 20th position.
