= 1939 World Archery Championships =

Competition held in Oslo, Norway

- Location: Oslo, Norway
- Start date: 31 July
- End date: 5 August
- Competitors: 55

The 1939 World Archery Championships was the 9th edition of the event. It was held in Oslo, Norway from 31 July to 5 August 1939 and was organised by World Archery Federation (FITA).

It was the last edition of the World Championships until 1946.

== Medals summary ==
=== Recurve ===
Event	Gold	Silver	Bronze
Men's individual	Roger Beday; France	Gaston Questemann; France	A. H. Mole; Great Britain
Women's individual	Janina Kurkowska; Poland	Natalia Szczycińska; Poland	Louise Nettleton; Great Britain
Men's team	France	United Kingdom	Sweden
Women's team	Poland	United Kingdom	Sweden

== Medals table ==
Rank	Nation	Gold	Silver	Bronze	Total
1	France	2	1	0	3
1	Poland	2	1	0	3
3	Great Britain	0	2	2	4
4	Sweden	0	0	2	2
Totals (4 entries)		4	4	4	12
