= 1934 World Archery Championships =

- Location: Båstad, Sweden
- Start date: 3 August
- End date: 4 August
- Competitors: 41

The 1934 World Archery Championships was the 4th edition of the event. It was held in Båstad, Sweden on 3–4 August 1934 and was organised by World Archery Federation (FITA).

== Medals summary ==
=== Recurve ===
Event	Gold	Silver	Bronze
Men's individual	Henry Kjelsson; Sweden	Emil Heilborn; Sweden	Oscar Kessels; Belgium
Women's individual	Janina Kurkowska; Poland	Anna Moczulska; Poland	Elsa Waldenström; Sweden
Men's team	Sweden	Belgium	Czechoslovakia
Women's team	Poland	Sweden	—

== Medals table ==
Rank	Nation	Gold	Silver	Bronze	Total
1	Sweden	2	2	1	5
2	Poland	2	1	0	3
3	Belgium	0	1	1	2
4	Czechoslovakia	0	0	1	1
Totals (4 entries)		4	4	3	11
