= 1948 World Archery Championships =

Archery championships

- Location: London, Great Britain
- Start date: 9 August
- End date: 14 August
- Competitors: 78

The 1948 World Archery Championships was the 12th edition of the event. It was held in London, Great Britain on 9–14 August 1948 and was organised by World Archery Federation (FITA).

== Medals summary ==
=== Recurve ===
Event	Gold	Silver	Bronze
Men's individual	Hans Deutgen; Sweden	Einar Tang-Holbeck; Denmark	Josef Brejcha; Czechoslovakia
Women's individual	Petronella de Wharton-Burr; Great Britain	Dana Picková; Czechoslovakia	Helena Sachová; Czechoslovakia
Men's team	Sweden	Denmark	Czechoslovakia
Women's team	Czechoslovakia	United Kingdom	Denmark

== Medals table ==
Rank	Nation	Gold	Silver	Bronze	Total
1	Sweden	2	0	0	2
2	Czechoslovakia	1	1	3	5
3	Great Britain	1	1	0	2
4	Denmark	0	2	1	3
Totals (4 entries)		4	4	4	12
