= 1947 World Archery Championships =

- Location: Prague, Czechoslovakia
- Start date: 12 August
- End date: 19 August
- Competitors: 65

The 1947 World Archery Championships was the 11th edition of the event. It was held in Prague, Czechoslovakia on 12–19 August 1947 and was organised by World Archery Federation (FITA).

== Medals summary ==
=== Recurve ===
Event	Gold	Silver	Bronze
Men's individual	Hans Deutgen; Sweden	Vaclav Karola; Czech Republic	Josef Brejcha; Czechoslovakia
Women's individual	Janina Kurkowska; Poland	Astrid Trølsen; Denmark	Petronella de Wharton-Burr; Great Britain
Men's team	Czechoslovakia	Denmark	Sweden
Women's team	Denmark	France	United Kingdom

== Medals table ==
Rank	Nation	Gold	Silver	Bronze	Total
1	Denmark	1	2	0	3
2	Czechoslovakia	1	1	1	3
3	Sweden	1	0	1	2
4	Poland	1	0	0	1
5	France	0	1	0	1
6	Great Britain	0	0	2	2
Totals (6 entries)		4	4	4	12
