= 1949 World Archery Championships =

- Location: Paris, France
- Start date: 9 August
- End date: 12 August
- Competitors: 70

The 1949 World Archery Championships was the 13th edition of the event. It was held in Paris, France on 9–12 August 1949 and was organised by World Archery Federation (FITA).

== Medals summary ==
=== Recurve ===
Event	Gold	Silver	Bronze
Men's individual	Hans Deutgen; Sweden	František Hadaš I Czechoslovakia	Einar Tang-Holbeck; Denmark
Women's individual	Barbara Waterhouse; Great Britain	Ragnhild Windahl; Sweden	Trogie Fisher; Great Britain
Men's team	Czechoslovakia	Sweden	Denmark
Women's team	United Kingdom	Sweden	France

== Medals table ==
Rank	Nation	Gold	Silver	Bronze	Total
1	Great Britain	2	0	1	3
2	Sweden	1	3	0	4
3	Czechoslovakia	1	1	0	2
4	Denmark	0	0	2	2
5	France	0	0	1	1
Totals (5 entries)		4	4	4	12
