= 1932 World Archery Championships =

- Location: Warsaw, Poland
- Start date: 11 August
- End date: 16 August
- Competitors: 24

The 1932 World Archery Championships was the 2nd edition of the event. It was held in Warsaw, Poland on 11–16 August 1932 and was organised by World Archery Federation (FITA).

== Medals summary ==
=== Recurve ===
Event	Gold	Silver	Bronze
Individual	Laurent Reth; Belgium	Zbigniew Kosinski; Poland	Janina Kurkowska; Poland
Team	Poland; Zibigniew Kosinski; Michal Sawicki; Zygmunt Łotocki	Poland; Janina Kurkowska; Marja Krolowna; Marja Trajdosowna	France; Rene Maureau; Maurice Denape; Paul Demare

== Medals table ==
Rank	Nation	Gold	Silver	Bronze	Total
1	Poland	1	2	1	4
2	Belgium	1	0	0	1
3	France	0	0	1	1
Totals (3 entries)		2	2	2	6
