= Simon Carves =

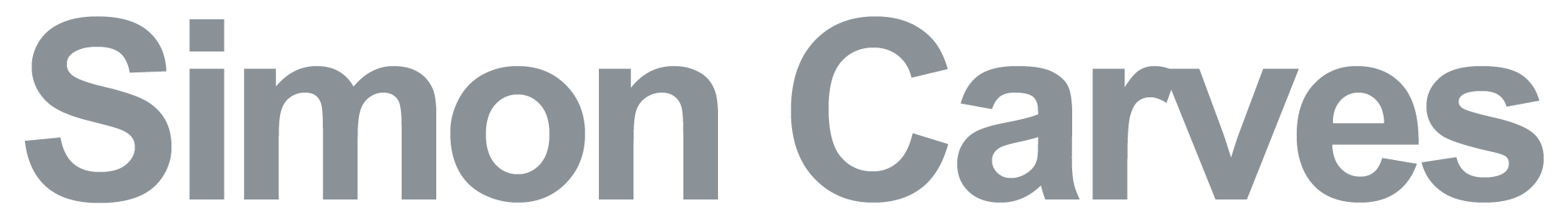

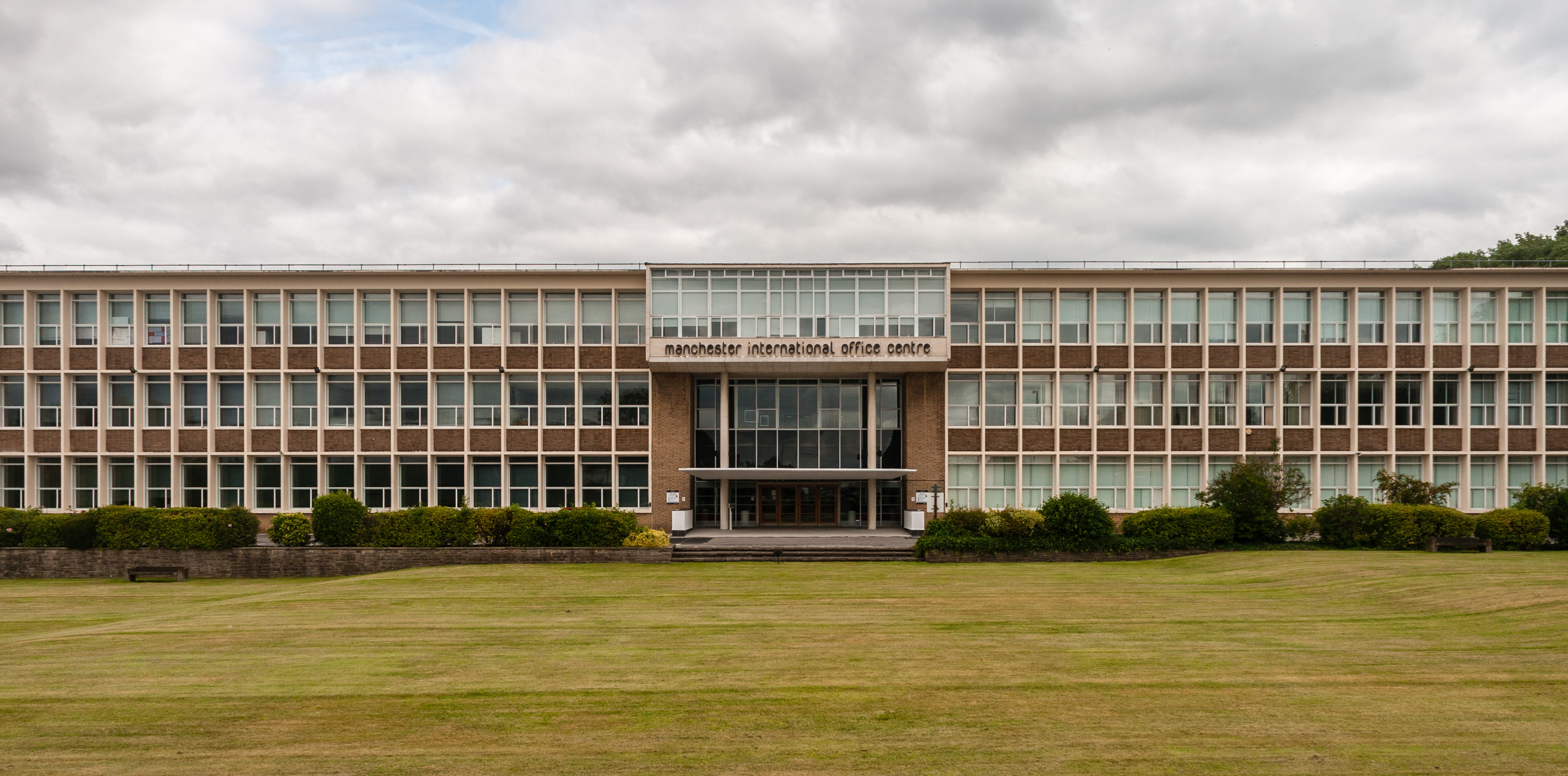
- Company type: Subsidiary
- Industry: Construction; Engineering
- Founded: 1878
- Founder: Henry Simon
- Headquarters: Wythenshawe, Manchester, England
- Area served: Worldwide
- Revenue: £9.8 million (2024)
- Net income: £0.3 million (2024)
- Parent: Mitsui E&S
- Website: www.simoncarveseng.com

Simon Carves Engineering is an engineering company headquartered in Manchester, England. Founded in 1878 by Henry Simon, it is a subsidiary of Mitsui E&S.

== History ==
German engineer Henry Simon moved to England in 1860 and settled in Didsbury.

In 1878, Simon visited the Bessèges works at Terrenoire in the south of France, and saw coke ovens being developed by the industrialist François Carvès. Realising the business potential, he formed a partnership with Carves, securing the patent rights for this innovative technology. Together, they established Simon Carves as a limited liability company in 1896.

In 1890, Henry Simon left a note to his sons, who were to inherit control of the company, urging them to acquire a sound technical education and to keep in close touch with scientific development throughout the world. His desire for them to be in a continuous search for engineering specialities and patents to improve the efficiency of large-scale industrial processes has shaped the business practice of Simon Carves Engineering.

In 2006, the business was purchased by Punj Lloyd. In 2016, it was sold to ECI Group, a subsidiary of Mitsui E&S.

Simon Carves's headquarters were at Simon House in the Atlas Business Park on Simonsway in Wythenshawe, near Manchester Airport. In 2015, the company moved to the nearby Altitude building. In the 2020s, Simon Carves was located on Aviator Way. In April 2022, the company relocated to offices in the Manchester International Office Centre on Styal Road.

== Overview ==
Simon Carves is involved in a number of technological sectors, including nuclear power, gasification, fertiliser, petroleum refining and petrochemicals. It operates internationally across six continents in 60 countries.

The company specialises as an engineering contractor for low-density polyethylene (LDPE) and ethylene-vinyl acetate (EVA) and is responsible for the design of 25% of the current global operating capacity. To date they have designed and supplied for more than 65 plants for polymer manufacturing, including 80 streams in 40 plants for LDPE and EVA.
