= 1935 World Archery Championships =

- Location: Brussels, Belgium
- Start date: 26 August
- End date: 31 August
- Competitors: 68

The 1935 World Archery Championships was the 5th edition of the event. It was held in Brussels, Belgium on 26–31 August 1935 and was organised by World Archery Federation (FITA).

The results of the men's tournament ended in controversy. For the first (and only) time, the competition took an elimination format: after a standard International round, consisting of 6 rounds shot at various lengths from 30m to 90m, the 15 archers with the highest cumulative score took part in a final round, shot at 30m, to decide the champion. In the women's competition, the eventual winner Ina Catani was the same as the first round winner; but in the men's, the Czechoslovak archers who had dominated the first round struggled against the host Belgian archers who were masters of the shorter distance. Adrien Van Kolen, winner of the final round, was named Champion, but Jaroslav Jenecek, who topped the first round and would have been champion under the previous format, was awarded a special 'High Total' trophy.

== Medals summary ==
=== Recurve ===
Event	Gold	Silver	Bronze
Men's individual	Adrien Van Kolen; Belgium	Georges De Rons; Belgium	Frans Walraevens; Belgium
Women's individual	Ina Catani; Sweden	E. Atkinson; Great Britain	Janina Kurkowska; Poland
Men's team	Czechoslovakia	Belgium	Sweden
Women's team	United Kingdom	Sweden	Poland

== Medals table ==
Rank	Nation	Gold	Silver	Bronze	Total
1	Belgium	1	2	1	4
2	Sweden	1	1	1	3
3	Great Britain	1	1	0	2
4	Czechoslovakia	1	0	0	1
5	Poland	0	0	2	2
Totals (5 entries)		4	4	4	12
