= 1952 World Archery Championships =

- Location: Brussels, Belgium
- Start date: 23 July
- End date: 26 July
- Competitors: 87

The 1952 World Archery Championships was the 15th edition of the event. It was held in Brussels, Belgium, on 23–26 July 1952, and was organised by the World Archery Federation (FITA).

== Medals summary ==
=== Recurve ===
Event	Gold	Silver	Bronze
Men's individual	Stellan Andersson; Sweden	Bror Lundgren; Sweden	Einar Tang-Holbeck; Denmark
Women's individual	Jean Lee; United States	Jean Richards; United States	Dorothy Hinton; Great Britain
Men's team	Sweden	Denmark	United Kingdom
Women's team	United States	United Kingdom	Sweden

== Medals table ==
Rank	Nation	Gold	Silver	Bronze	Total
1	Sweden	2	1	1	4
2	United States	2	1	0	3
3	Great Britain	0	1	2	3
4	Denmark	0	1	1	2
Totals (4 entries)		4	4	4	12
