= Gunnar Jervill =

Swedish archer (born 1945)

Medal record

Men's Archery

Representing Sweden

Olympic Games
Silver medal – second place	1972 Munich	Individual

Gunnar Jervill (born 23 November 1945) is an archer from Sweden, who was born in Gothenburg.

He competed for Sweden in the 1972 Summer Olympics held in Munich, Germany in the individual event where he finished in second place behind American John Williams. Four years later he finished 14th at the 1976 Summer Olympics held in Montreal, Quebec, Canada
