= 1958 World Archery Championships =

Archery championships

- Location: Brussels, Belgium
- Start date: 20 July
- End date: 23 July
- Competitors: 134

The 1958 World Archery Championships was the 19th edition of the event. It was held in Brussels, Belgium on 20–23 July 1958 and was organised by World Archery Federation (FITA).

== Medals summary ==
=== Recurve ===
Event	Gold	Silver	Bronze
Men's individual	Stig Thysell; Sweden	Olavi Kallionpaä; Finland	Roy Matthews; Great Britain
Women's individual	Sigrid Johansson; Sweden	Ann Corby; United States	Carole Meinhart; United States
Men's team	Finland	Sweden	United States
Women's team	United States	Czechoslovakia	South Africa

== Medals table ==
Rank	Nation	Gold	Silver	Bronze	Total
1	Sweden	2	1	0	3
2	United States	1	1	2	4
3	Finland	1	1	0	2
4	Czechoslovakia	0	1	0	1
5	Great Britain	0	0	1	1
5	South Africa	0	0	1	1
Totals (6 entries)		4	4	4	12
