= Henry Gustav Simon =

German engineer

Henry Simon
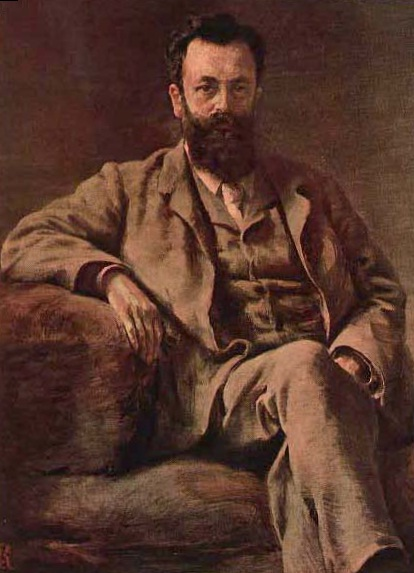
- Portrait of Henry Simon by Clara von Rappard
- Born: Gustav Heinrich Victor Amandus Simon; 7 June 1835; Silesia, Kingdom of Prussia
- Died: 22 July 1899 (aged 64); Manchester, England
- Occupation: Engineer
- Known for: Founder of Henry Simon Ltd and Simon-Carves Ltd
- Spouse: Emily Stoehr
- Children: 7 (including Ernest Simon, 1st Baron Simon of Wythenshawe)
- Relatives: Heinrich Simon (uncle)

Gustav Heinrich Victor Amandus Simon, known as Henry Simon, (7 June 1835 – 22 July 1899) was a German engineer who revolutionised Great Britain's flour milling industry and in 1878 founded the engineering companies Henry Simon Ltd and Simon Carves. His second son, Ernest Simon went on to become the first Baron Simon of Wythenshawe.

== Youth and education ==
Henry Simon was born in Brieg, Silesia, then a province of Prussia, on 7 June 1835. He was named Heinrich. His father was a director at one of Germany's first railways, which allowed Henry to spend much of his youth in and among the railways; sparking an inclination to study mechanics from an early age. In his teenage years Henry was witness to the revolutionary ferment of 1848 and gradually grew disillusioned with his native country. When his much loved uncle Heinrich Simon was forced to seek political refuge in Switzerland, Henry followed him and it was here that he went on to gain his Engineering Diploma from Zurich Technical Polytechnical School. Armed solely with this and a 'surcharge of mental energy and business initiative', Henry moved to Manchester where he would make a lasting name for himself.

== Family life ==
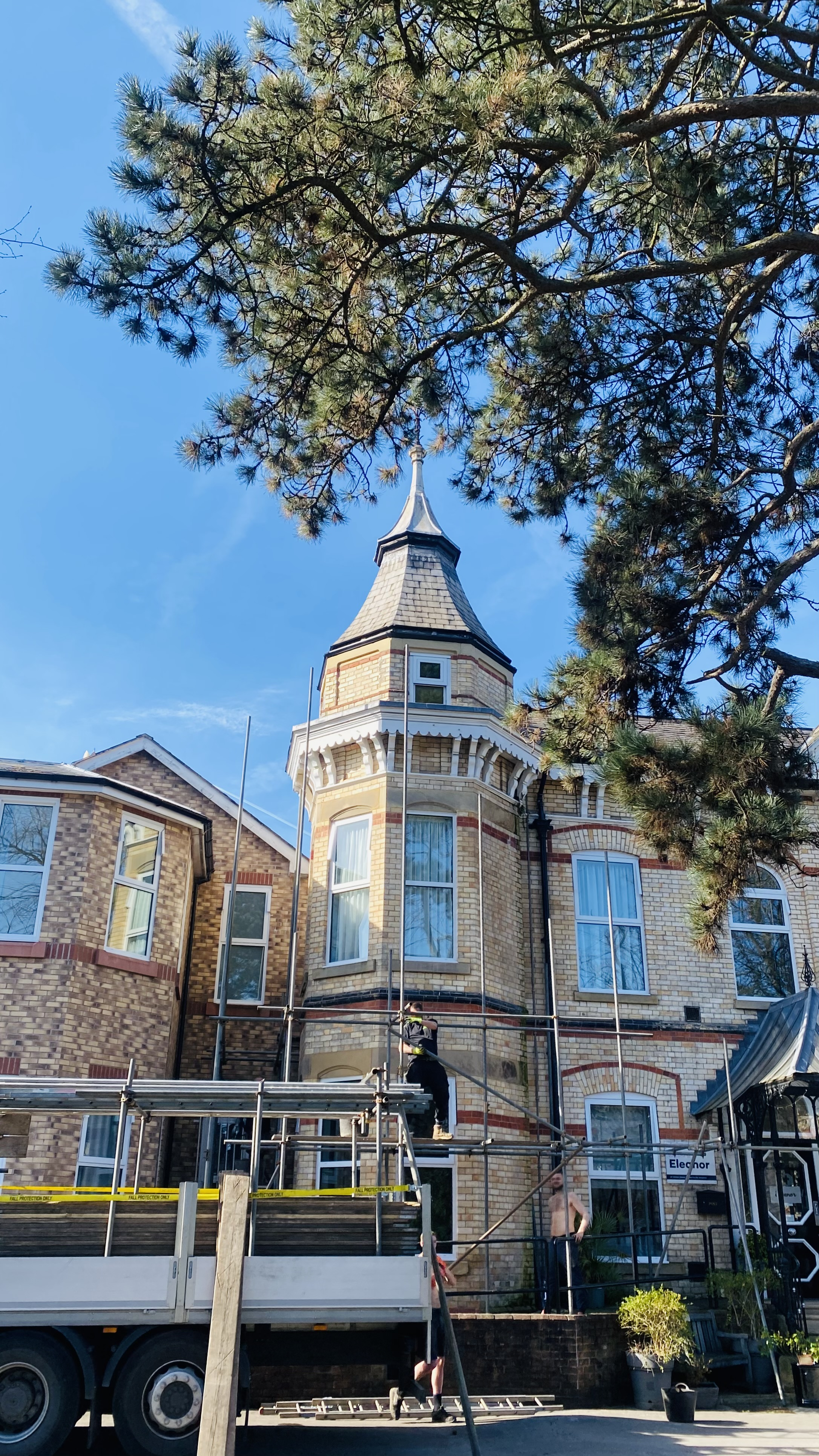
The first Simon family residence, Darwin House on Palatine Road, West Didsbury

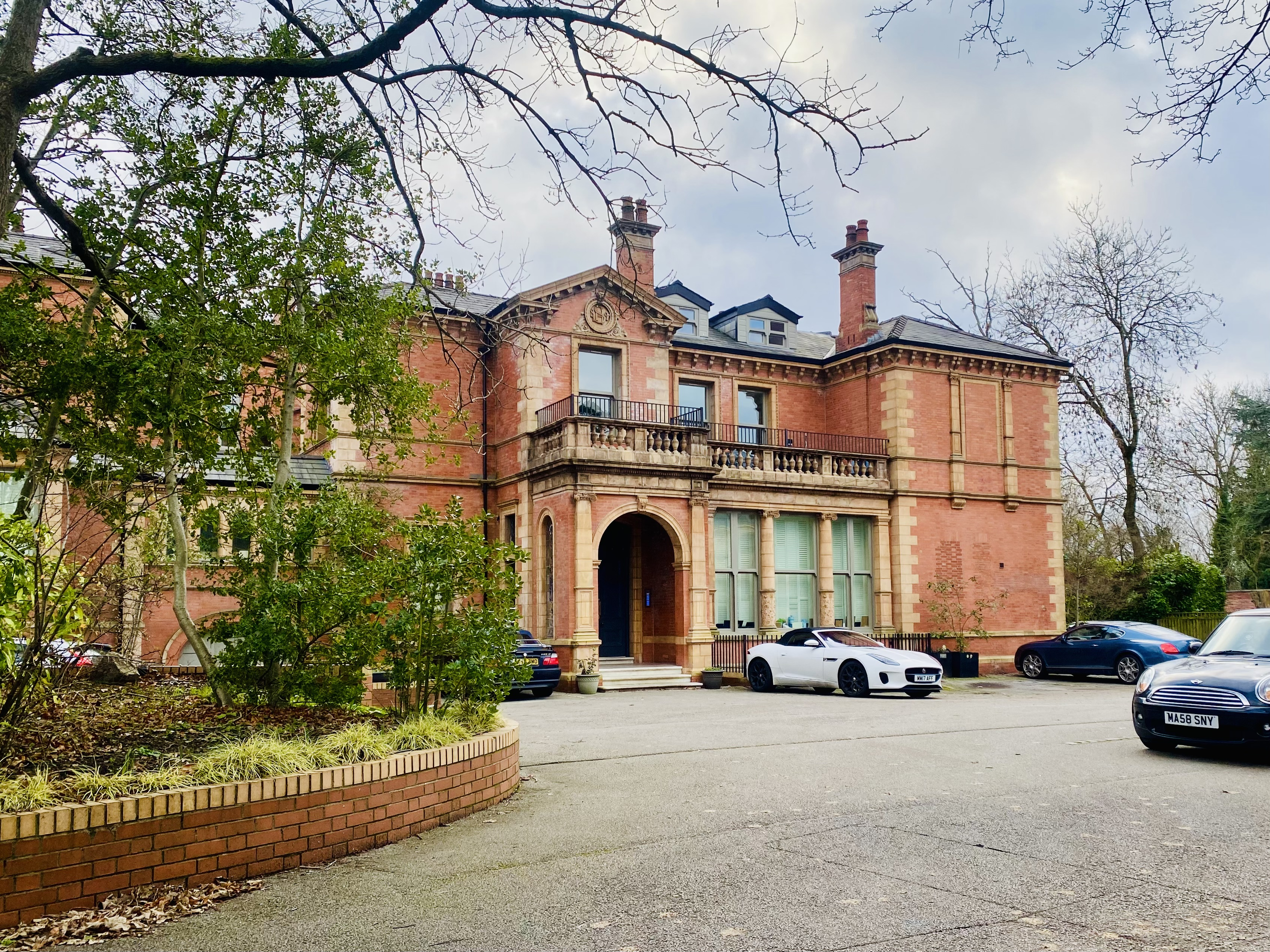
Lawnhurst, the Simon family home in East Didsbury from 1892

In 1874 Simon married Mary Jane Lane of Melbourne, Australia who bore him a son, Ingo in 1875 before her death in 1876. Subsequently, in 1878, he married Emily Stoehr who added a further four sons and three daughters, their eldest son, Ernest Darwin, was to succeed him on his death as head of the business and become Baron Simon of Wythenshawe in 1947.

In the 1870s, Gustav, Mary Jane and Ingo lived at Darwin House on Palatine Road, West Didsbury. Simon purchased land in Didsbury with a house named Lawnhurst, which he demolished and replaced with a new house, also named Lawnhurst, designed by the architects Edward Salomons and Alfred Steinthal. It was completed around 1892. The interior of the house included a grand staircase flanked by ornamental stained-glass windows, each inscribed with mottoes from his Rathschlaege, written in French, German, Latin and Sanskrit. In 1897, the Simons entertained the Norwegian explorer Fridtjof Nansen at Lawnhurst.

== Career ==
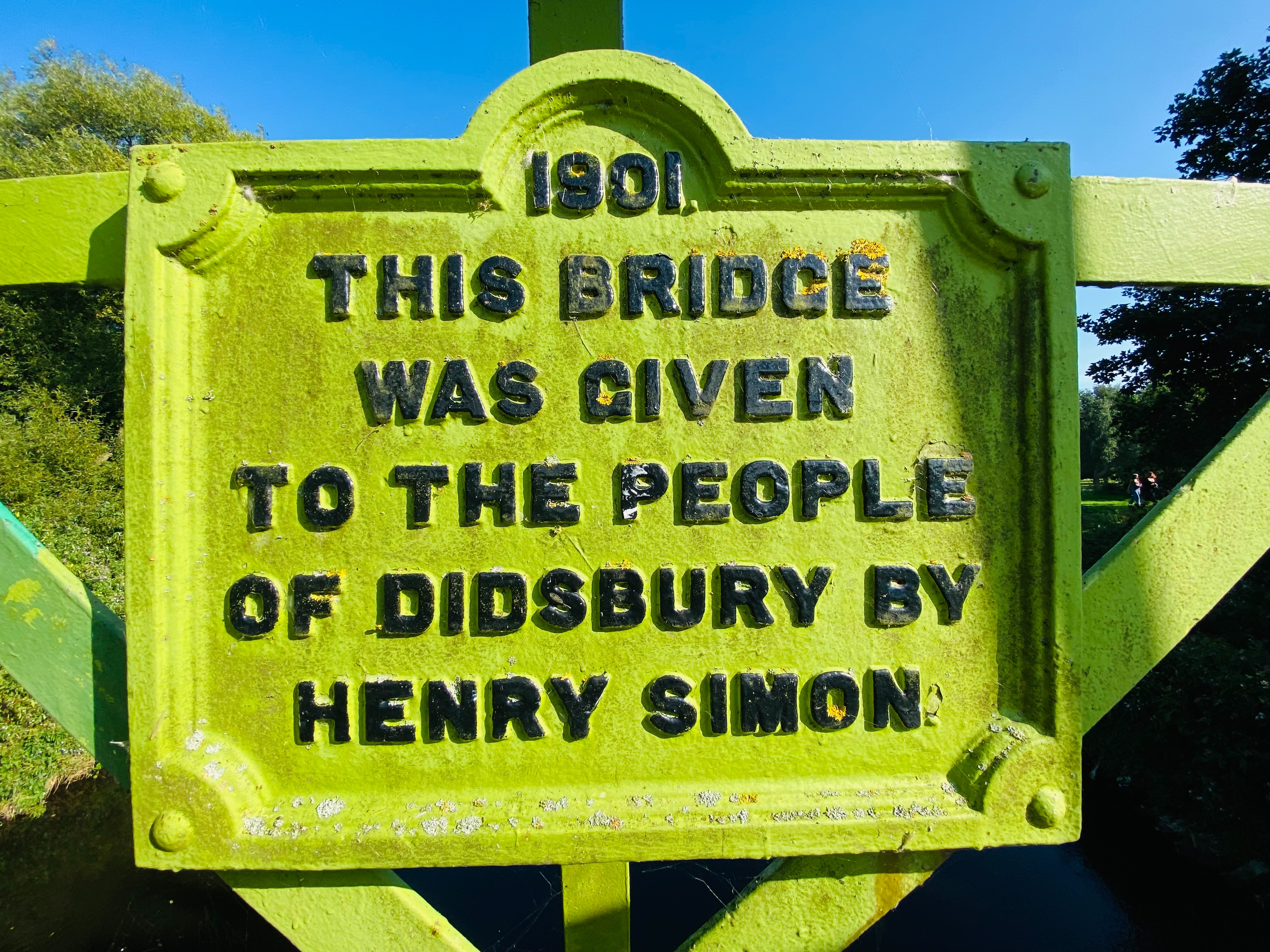
The Simon Bridge over the River Mersey at Didsbury, gifted by Henry Simon and erected in 1901

=== Flour Milling Industry ===
Despite arriving in Manchester in 1860 without a penny to his name, within seven years Henry had established himself as a consulting engineer with his own office and become a naturalised British Citizen. But it was in 1878 when he saw his first real success. By introducing a rolling flour milling plant for McDougall Brothers in Manchester, the likes of which he had seen working in Switzerland, Henry set in motion and guided the 'Rollermilling Revolution', a mechanisation of the British flour milling system. Not only did this form the foundation of his own successful business, Henry Simon, converted to a limited company in 1896/7, but it also transformed the 'slow, laborious and costly' batch pattern previously used, into one of the most 'highly mechanised industries in the world'.

=== Coke Ovens ===
In 1878 he turned his interest towards the transformation of a second industrial process; revolutionising the manufacturing of coke. A conservative and crude process, the use of 'beehive ovens' to produce a deposit of coke also caused the creation of by-products which proved harmful to the environment; posing another 'promising development' for Henry Simon to introduce a technological change.

Visiting the Besseges works at Terrenoire along with a large party of engineers in 1878, Henry Simon saw the potential for the coke oven business in development by Francois Carves. He secured the patent rights to this innovative technology and in due course established a second firm alongside his already prosperous milling industry; Simon Carves.

However, the conservatism of the coke industry in Britain was so profound that Henry was unable swiftly implement this revolutionary technology into the mainstream. Forced to finance the 'new-type ovens' himself, it was not until 1892 that he found a means of popularising the new method in such a manner as to allow for an advancement and expansion of the technology.

== Legacy ==
In addition to his industrial activities, Simon played a major role in the educational and intellectual life of his adopted city. A great friend of his fellow countryman Charles Hallé Simon was a founding member of the Hallé Concerts Society and after Hallé's death in 1895 he was instrumental in bringing Hungarian born Hans Richter to lead the musical life of Manchester for 12 triumphant years.

Dissatisfied with the options for educating his daughters to the same standard as his sons Simon, together with C. P. Scott, co-founded the school in the 1890s which became the celebrated Withington Girls' School. Also in 1890, Henry Simon left a note to his sons, urging them to acquire a sound technical education and to keep closely in touch with scientific developments throughout the world. His desire for them to be in a continuous search for engineering specialities and patents which would be used to improve the efficiency of large scale industrial processes in Britain and elsewhere, has eked into the company mentality and remains a leading factor in Simon Carves Engineering's approach to business today. Providing a 'comprehensive range of services to the Process and Energy industries world wide', Simon Carves Engineering continues to exhibit a 'constant willingness to embrace new technologies, innovative project methodologies and construction methods'. In 1898, as a leading benefactor, he was asked to lay the foundation stone for the new Physics Laboratories for Owens College, later integrated in 1903 into the Victoria University of Manchester. These laboratories were where Ernest Rutherford, Hans Geiger et al. in 1907 to 1919 laid many of the foundations of modern nuclear physics and first 'split' the atom. A long time advocate of the introduction of crematoria, Simon, as chairman of the Manchester Crematorium Company, was instrumental in the building of the first crematorium outside the London area at the Southern Cemetery in 1892.

Near the end of his life, Simon provided the funds for a footbridge to be constructed over the River Mersey at Didsbury. Simon's Bridge was completed two years after his death, in 1901, and is still in use today.
