= Archery Canada =

Sports governing body in Canada

Archery Canada is the national governing body for the sport of Archery in Canada as recognised by the World Archery Federation.
