= 1938 World Archery Championships =

World Archery Federation

- Location: London, Great Britain
- Start date: 8 August
- End date: 13 August
- Competitors: 69

The 1938 World Archery Championships was the 8th edition of the event. It was held in London, Great Britain on 8–13 August 1938 and was organised by World Archery Federation (FITA).

In the women's individual competition, Nora Weston-Martyr and Louise Nettleton finished with equal scores and are considered co-champions by FITA.

== Medals summary ==
=== Recurve ===
| Event | Gold | Silver | Bronze |
|---|---|---|---|
| Men's individual | František Hadaš I Czechoslovakia | Feliks Majewski; Poland | C. Smith; Great Britain |
| Women's individual | Nora Weston-Martyr; Great Britain; Louise Nettleton; Great Britain | | Janina Kurkowska; Poland |
| Men's team | Czechoslovakia | Poland | France |
| Women's team | Poland | United Kingdom | Sweden |

== Medals table ==
| Rank | Nation | Gold | Silver | Bronze | Total |
|---|---|---|---|---|---|
| 1 | Great Britain | 2 | 1 | 1 | 4 |
| 2 | Czechoslovakia | 2 | 0 | 0 | 2 |
| 3 | Poland | 1 | 2 | 1 | 4 |
| 4 | France | 0 | 0 | 1 | 1 |
| 4 | Sweden | 0 | 0 | 1 | 1 |
| Totals (5 entries) | | 5 | 3 | 4 | 12 |
