= 1953 World Archery Championships =

- Location: Oslo, Norway
- Start date: 21 July
- End date: 25 July
- Competitors: 61

The 1953 World Archery Championships was the 16th edition of the event. It was held in Oslo, Norway on 21–25 July 1953 and was organised by World Archery Federation (FITA).

== Medals summary ==
=== Recurve ===
Event	Gold	Silver	Bronze
Men's individual	Bror Lundgren; Sweden	Einar Tang-Holbek; Denmark	Carl-Eric Bissman; Sweden
Women's individual	Jean Richards; United States	Ilta-Meri Santaoja; Finland	Jacqueline Lang; France
Men's team	Sweden	Denmark	Belgium
Women's team	Finland	France	Sweden

== Medals table ==
Rank	Nation	Gold	Silver	Bronze	Total
1	Sweden	2	0	2	4
2	Finland	1	1	0	2
3	United States	1	0	0	1
4	Denmark	0	2	0	2
5	France	0	1	1	2
6	Belgium	0	0	1	1
Totals (6 entries)		4	4	4	12
