= Archery at the 1972 Summer Olympics =

Archery at the Games of the XX Olympiad
- Venue: Englischer Garten
- Dates: 7–10 September 1972
- No. of events: 2 (1 men, 1 women)
- Competitors: 95 from 27 nations

Archery at the 1972 Summer Olympics consisted of two medal events, one for men and one for women.

Each event was composed of two FITA rounds. Each of those FITA rounds consisted of the archers shooting 36 arrows at targets at 4 different distances, for a total of 144 arrows. The distances were 90, 70, 50, and 30 metres for men and 70, 60, 50, and 30 metres for women. 18 nations competed in both the men's and women's events, while 3 competed in only the women's and 6 competed only in the men's.

== Medal summary ==
=== Events ===
Event	Gold	Silver	Bronze
Men's individual	John Williams; United States	Gunnar Jervill; Sweden	Kyösti Laasonen; Finland
Women's individual	Doreen Wilber; United States	Irena Szydłowska; Poland	Emma Gapchenko; Soviet Union

=== Medal table ===
Rank	Nation	Gold	Silver	Bronze	Total
1	United States	2	0	0	2
2	Poland	0	1	0	1
2	Sweden	0	1	0	1
4	Finland	0	0	1	1
4	Soviet Union	0	0	1	1
Totals (5 entries)		2	2	2	6

== Participating nations ==
Nation	Men's Individual	Women's Individual	Total
Australia	2	1	3
Belgium	3	0	3
Canada	3	3	6
Denmark	2	2	4
Finland	3	0	3
France	3	2	5
Great Britain	3	3	6
Hungary	1	1	2
Indonesia	0	1	1
Italy	3	0	3
Japan	3	1	4
Luxembourg	1	1	2
Mexico	3	3	6
Mongolia	1	2	3
New Zealand	1	0	1
North Korea	0	3	3
Norway	3	1	4
Philippines	3	0	3
Poland	1	3	4
Puerto Rico	1	0	1
Republic of China	0	1	1
Soviet Union	3	3	6
Spain	1	1	2
Sweden	3	2	5
Switzerland	3	1	4
United States	3	3	6
West Germany	2	2	4
Total athletes	55	40	95
Total NOCs	24	21	27
