= 1955 World Archery Championships =

- Location: Helsinki, Finland
- Start date: 19 July
- End date: 22 July
- Competitors: 89

The 1955 World Archery Championships was the 17th edition of the event. It was held in Helsinki, Finland on 19–22 July 1955 and was organised by World Archery Federation (FITA).

== Medals summary ==
=== Recurve ===
Event	Gold	Silver	Bronze
Men's individual	Nils Andersson; Sweden	Robert Rhode; United States	Bertil Olsson; Sweden
Women's individual	Katarzyna Wisniowska; Poland	Joyce Warner; Great Britain	Impi Hartikainen; Finland
Men's team	Sweden	Finland	Belgium
Women's team	United Kingdom	Finland	Poland

== Medals table ==
Rank	Nation	Gold	Silver	Bronze	Total
1	Sweden	2	0	1	3
2	Great Britain	1	1	0	2
3	Poland	1	0	1	2
4	Finland	0	2	1	3
5	United States	0	1	0	1
6	Belgium	0	0	1	1
Totals (6 entries)		4	4	4	12
