= Ray Rogers (archer) =

American archer

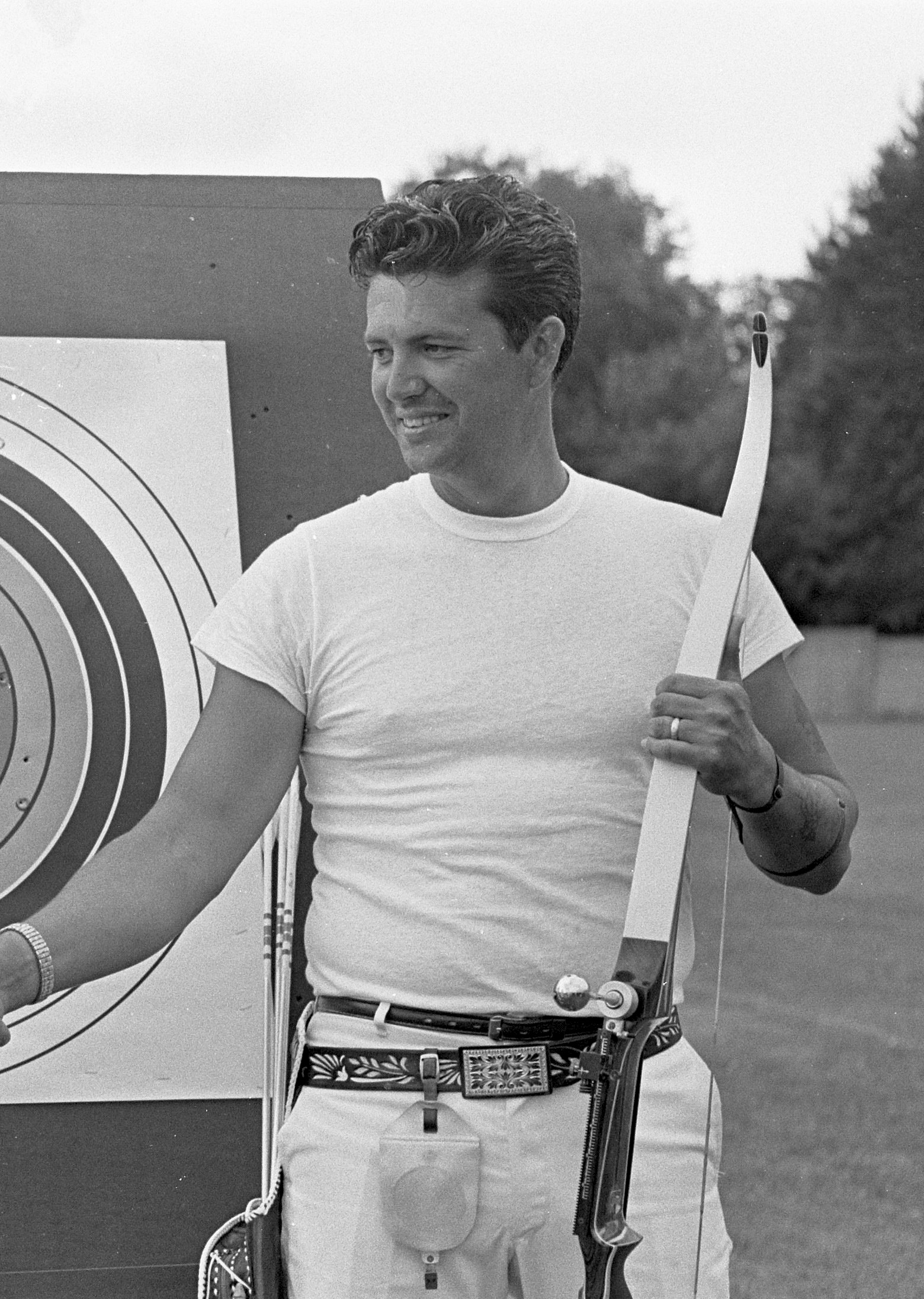
- Ray Rogers in 1967

Personal information
- Born: Muldrow, Oklahoma, United States

Sport
- Sport: Archery
Medal record
Representing the United States
World Championships
| Gold medal – first place | 1967 Amersfort | Individual |
| Gold medal – first place | 1967 Amersfort | Team |

Ray Rogers is an American retired archer. He won the world championships in 1967, both individually and in the team competition, and set several world records in 1967 and 1968. He retired soon after winning a national title in 1969, before archery was reintroduced to the Olympic Games in 1972. In 2007 he was inducted to the Oklahoma State Archery Association Hall of Fame.
