= Louise Nettleton =

British archer and mountaineer

Louise Nettleton (née Dyer) (1874–1954) was a British archery champion and a mountaineer.

== Biography ==
Louise Dyer was born in Surry in 1874, the daughter of Abraham Dyer, a chemist. In 1898 she married Charles William Nettleton (1871–1962) and during the Great War she was a certified mechanic in the Motor Section of the WVR. She died on 22 October 1954.

== Mountaineering ==
Nettleton was a distinguished mountaineer who was elected President of the Ladies' Alpine Club (1920–1922). In the early 1900s she was "looked up to by her contemporaries as one of the really great climbers of those days".

She excelled at rock climbing, both in the Alps and on short technical routes in the UK. Amongst her more notable alpine achievements were the traverse of Monte Rosa in 1900; the Cinque Torri and Kleine Zinne in 1901; the Aiguille de Blaitiere in 1903; the Weisshorn in 1904 and the traverse of the Matterhorn in 1906. Her greatest alpine achievement during those years was leading the traverse of the Aiguille du Grépon in 1903, accompanied by her husband and a porter.

Prior to her alpine exploits she had led climbs in the UK which at the time were held to be particularly demanding. One of those was Kern Knotts Crack on Great Gable in the Lake District, about which George Abraham wrote "an expert, and none other should attempt the course" in the introduction to his book he adds that "The traverse of the Aiguille de Grepon at Chamonix is just as much rock-gymnastics as the ascent of Kern Knotts Crack on Great Gable". She led Kern Knotts Crack at the age of 23, only a year after Owen Glynne Jones had made the first ascent in 1897.

== Archery ==
Nettleton's "fame as an archer was great". She was competing in international archery until her late 70s, and was present at every world championship until 1952. She was on the winning team at the World Archery Championships three times, in 1935, 1937 and 1946. and was awarded the gold medal in the women's individual competition at the 1938 World Archery Championships where she finished as co-champion with Nora Weston Martyr, no silver medal was awarded that year. In 1933, 1939 and 1946 she was the British National Champion and at the 1939 World Archery Championships she was awarded the bronze medal in the women's individual competition.

She was Honorary Vice-president of the Grand National Archery Society (later Archery GB), the Southern Counties Archery Society and the Royal Toxophilite Society.
