= Hardy Ward =

American archer

Medal record

Men's Archery

Representing United States

World Championships
Gold medal – first place	1969 Valley Forge	Individual
Gold medal – first place	1969 Valley Forge	Team
Gold medal – first place	1967 Amersfoort	Team
Bronze medal – third place	1967 Amersfoort	Individual

Hardy Ward (born c.1950 Mount Pleasant, Texas, United States—died 2018 Hong Kong at the age of 69) was a World Champion archer who represented the United States.

Ward won his first national title at the age of 16 in 1966, becoming the youngest man to do so. In 1967 he was first selected to represent the United States at the World Archery Championships in Amersfoort, Netherlands, where he placed 3rd and was part of the gold medal winning team. He regained his national title in 1968 before going on to win the 1969 World Archery Championships, held in Valley Forge, Pennsylvania.

Ward was not selected to represent the United States at the 1972 Olympics, the first post-war Olympics to feature archery. He later developed a range of crossbows and has lived in China.
