= 1937 World Archery Championships =

- Location: Paris, France
- Start date: 11 August
- End date: 14 August
- Competitors: 65

The 1937 World Archery Championships was the 7th edition of the event. It was held in Paris, France on 11–14 August 1937 and was organised by World Archery Federation (FITA).

== Medals summary ==
=== Recurve ===
Event	Gold	Silver	Bronze
Men's individual	Georges De Rons; Belgium	Feliks Majewski; Poland	Oscar Kessels; Belgium
Women's individual	Erna Simon; Great Britain	Irene Crupenninck; France	Zofia Bunsch; Poland
Men's team	Poland	Belgium	Sweden
Women's team	United Kingdom	Poland	France

== Medals table ==
Rank	Nation	Gold	Silver	Bronze	Total
1	Great Britain	2	0	0	2
2	Poland	1	2	1	4
3	Belgium	1	1	1	3
4	France	0	1	1	2
5	Sweden	0	0	1	1
Totals (5 entries)		4	4	4	12
