= 1965 World Archery Championships =

Archery championships

- Location: Västerås, Sweden
- Start date: 20 July
- End date: 23 July
- Competitors: 170

The 1965 World Archery Championships was the 23rd edition of the event. It was held in Västerås, Sweden on 20–23 July 1965 and was organised by World Archery Federation (FITA).

== Medals summary ==
=== Recurve ===
Event	Gold	Silver	Bronze
Men's individual	Matti Haikonen; Finland	Joe Thornton; United States	Ben Walker; United States
Women's individual	Maire Lindholm; Finland	Anita Schlebusch; South Africa	Juliette Rijff; South Africa
Men's team	United States; Joe Thornton; Ben Walker; Dick Tone	Finland; Matti Haikonen; Jorma Sandelin; Tuomo Virtanen	Sweden; John Bask; Kjell-Ake Dunder; Per-Ola Jaderberg
Women's team	United States; Grace Amborski; Helen Thornton; Ardelle Mills	Finland; Maire Lindholm; Elma Haikonen; Tuulikki Valkama	United Kingdom; C. Britton; P. White; J. Chapman

== Medals table ==
Rank	Nation	Gold	Silver	Bronze	Total
1	Finland	2	2	0	4
2	United States	2	1	1	4
3	South Africa	0	1	1	2
4	Great Britain	0	0	1	1
4	Sweden	0	0	1	1
Totals (5 entries)		4	4	4	12
