= Ingo Simon =

- Born: Ingo Heinrich Julius William Gustav Simon; 6 May 1875; Chorlton, Lancashire, England
- Died: 31 July 1964 (aged 89); Exeter, Devon, England
- Other name: Ingo Henry Simon
- Known for: Archery
- Spouse: Erna
- Parents: Henry Gustav Simon; Mary Jane Lane

Ingo Heinrich Julius William Gustav Simon (6 May 1875 – 31 July 1964), also known as Ingo Henry Simon, was an English singer, poet and accomplished archer who spent many years researching the history of archery and the development of bows. From 1914 to 1933, he held the world record for a flight-shot at 462 yards (422 m).

== Life and career ==
Simon was born in Chorlton-on-Medlock, Manchester, the child of German engineer Henry Gustav Simon and his first wife, Mary Jane Lane of Melbourne, Australia. One of his younger half-brothers was Ernest Simon, 1st Baron Simon of Wythenshawe. He was an operatic singer and teacher. In 1918, he was living in the United States.

In 1910, an archery contest was held on the beach at Le Touquet, France, where Simon was able to shoot an arrow 475 yards (434 m) using an old Turkish composite bow requiring a force of 440 newtons (99 lbf).

Roving Shafts, a volume of his poems, some about archery, was published in 1924.

He died in 1964 in Devon and his widow, Erna, the 1937 women's world champion died in 1973; they endowed a trust in 1970, to conserve and develop his collection of bows, arrows and related equipment, which he donated to the Manchester Museum in 1946. The collection includes artefacts from many countries including Great Britain, Brazil, Europe, India, Pakistan, Japan, Central Asia, Africa, and the Pacific islands.

== Works ==
- Roving Shafts. Thornton Butterworth Ltd. 1924.
