= Joe Thornton (archer) =

American archer (1916–2019)

Joseph Thornton
- Born: August 2, 1916; Stilwell, Oklahoma, U.S.
- Died: February 4, 2019 (aged 102); Tahlequah, Oklahoma, U.S.
- Occupation: Archer
- Known for: Archery championships

Joseph Thornton (August 2, 1916 – February 4, 2019) was a Cherokee archer.

== Career ==
Thornton was the Oklahoma State Archery Champion in 1960. After finishing fourth in the 1961 USA Archery Trials, his club raised money to send him to the World Championship in Oslo, Norway. That same year, he became World Champion by over 100 points, setting three world records. Not only did he win the World Championship, but he was also a member of the gold winning men's team. He earned individual silver medals in 1963 and 1965 at the World Championship. During those two years, he also earned team gold with the Men's USA team.

He was also the 1962 British International Trials Champion, the 1967 USA Team Gold World Tournament title holder, the 1970 USA National Champion, and a 1971 USA Team Gold World Champion.

Thornton was inducted into the American Indian Athletic Hall of Fame in 1978. In 2016 the Cherokee Nation established the Joe Thornton Archery Range in Park Hill, Oklahoma.
