= 1933 World Archery Championships =

- Venue: Ranelagh Club
- Location: London, Great Britain
- Start date: 31 July
- End date: 5 August
- Competitors: 41

The 1933 World Archery Championships was the 3rd edition of the event. It was held at the Ranelagh Club in London, Great Britain from 31 July to 5 August 1933 and was organised by World Archery Federation (FITA).

It was the first time that separate men's and women's competitions were organised.

== Medals summary ==
=== Recurve ===
Event	Gold	Silver	Bronze
Men's individual	Donald MacKenzie; United States	Emil Heilborn; Sweden	Georges de Rons; Belgium
Women's individual	Janina Kurkowska; Poland	Louisa Sandford; Great Britain	Marja Trajdosowna; Poland
Men's team	Belgium	United Kingdom	France
Women's team	Poland	United Kingdom	—

== Medals table ==
Rank	Nation	Gold	Silver	Bronze	Total
1	Poland	2	0	1	3
2	Belgium	1	0	1	2
3	United States	1	0	0	1
4	Great Britain	0	3	0	3
5	Sweden	0	1	0	1
6	France	0	0	1	1
Totals (6 entries)		4	4	3	11
