= Hans Deutgen =

Swedish archer (1917–1989)

Medal record

Men's Archery

Representing Sweden

World Championships
Gold medal – first place	1947 Prague	Individual
Gold medal – first place	1948 London	Individual
Gold medal – first place	1949 Paris	Individual
Gold medal – first place	1950 Copenhagen	Individual
Gold medal – first place	1948 London	Team
Silver medal – second place	1946 Stockholm	Individual
Silver medal – second place	1949 Paris	Team
Silver medal – second place	1950 Copenhagen	Team
Bronze medal – third place	1947 Prague	Team

Hans Teodor Deutgen (28 February 1917 in Stockholm, Sweden – 3 October 1989) was a World Champion archer who represented Sweden.

== Career ==
Deutgen remains the most successful male archer of all time at the World Archery Championships, winning the championship on four consecutive occasions between 1947 and 1950, before the event became biennial. Upon being presented with his fourth gold in 1950, he passed it to third place Russ Reynolds, who was suffering from leukemia. Deutgen retired from competition in 1953.
