= Ina Catani =

Swedish archer

Personal information
- Nationality: Swedish
- Born: Ina Heilborn; 30 May 1906
- Died: 28 March 1938 (aged 31)

Sport
- Sport: Archery
- Club: Stockholms BK
Medal record
Women's archery
Representing Sweden
World Championships
Gold medal – first place	1935 Brussels	Individual

Ina Catani, born Heilborn 30 May 1906, died 28 March 1938, was a Swedish archer.

== Merits ==
- World champion 1935, Sweden's first female world champion.
