= Kauko Laasonen =

Finnish archer (born 1951)

Personal information
- Nationality: Finnish
- Born: 8 January 1951 (age 75) Kesälahti, Finland

Sport
- Sport: Archery

Kauko Laasonen (born 8 January 1951) is a Finnish archer. He competed in the men's individual event at the 1976 Summer Olympics.
