= Graeme Telford =

Australian archer (born 1942)

Personal information
- Nationality: Australian
- Born: 19 March 1942
- Died: 21 November 1977 (aged 35)

Sport
- Sport: Archery

Graeme Telford (19 March 1942 – 21 November 1977) was an Australian archer. He competed in the men's individual event at the 1972 Summer Olympics.
