= 1959 World Archery Championships =

Archery championships

- Location: Stockholm, Sweden
- Start date: 6 August
- End date: 9 August
- Competitors: 116

The 1959 World Archery Championships was the 20th edition of the event. It was held in Stockholm, Sweden on 6–9 August 1959 and was organised by World Archery Federation (FITA).

It marked the first win in a run of 13 successive championship wins for the United States men's team.

== Medals summary ==
=== Recurve ===
Event	Gold	Silver	Bronze
Men's individual	James Caspers; United States	Robert Kadiee; United States	James Needey; United States
Women's individual	Ann Corby; United States	Sigrid Johansson; Sweden	Lucille Shine; United States
Men's team	United States	Belgium	Sweden
Women's team	United States	United Kingdom	Czechoslovakia

== Medals table ==
Rank	Nation	Gold	Silver	Bronze	Total
1	United States	4	1	2	7
2	Sweden	0	1	1	2
3	Belgium	0	1	0	1
3	Great Britain	0	1	0	1
5	Czechoslovakia	0	0	1	1
Totals (5 entries)		4	4	4	12
