= Wayne Pullen =

Canadian archer (born 1945)

Personal information
- Nationality: Canadian
- Born: 27 February 1945 (age 81) Vancouver, British Columbia, Canada

Sport
- Sport: Archery

Wayne Pullen (born 27 February 1945) is a Canadian archer. He competed in the men's individual event at the 1972 Summer Olympics.
