= Irena Szydłowska =

Polish archer (1928–1983)

Medal record

Women's Archery

Representing Poland

Olympic Games
Silver medal – second place	1972 Munich	Individual

Irena Szydłowska (28 January 1928 in Lwów, Poland – 14 August 1983 in Warsaw, Poland) is an archer from Poland.

She competed for Poland in the 1972 Summer Olympics held in Munich, Germany in the individual event where she finished in second place. She also finished twentieth four years later in the 1976 Summer Olympics in Montreal, Quebec, Canada.
