= Weston Martyr =

British yacht racer

Joseph Weston Martyr (1885 – 27 March 1966), was a pioneer British ocean yachtsman, writer and broadcaster, who was influential in the creation of the Fastnet race after participating in similar races in Bermuda in 1924

Martyr's varied adult life started when he went to sea at the age of 15 to serve on square-riggers and then steamers. He then worked as a miner in South Africa, a labour recruiter in China for Rand Mines and in the merchant and steamship business in Japan. He also spent time trading in the South Seas and banking in Formosa (Taiwan), and also acted as consul in Shimonoseki.

After serving with the Royal Engineers during the First World War in France, he returned to the Pacific, and then ran a steamship business in New York. In 1922 he finished his wandering and turned to writing. His first book, The Southseaman (1926) describes the design and building of yacht in the fishing port of Shelburne, Nova Scotia ("Sheldon" in text). The latter chapters chronicle a voyage to Bermuda and the eventual employment of the vessel in the rum-running trade. The book became a classic of the voyaging genre and was re-published and reprinted several times.

Many of his stories were published in Blackwood's Magazine and heard on BBC Radio. The £200 Pound Millionaire (1931) explains how to live cheaply on a yacht, and a follow-up essay, Five Hundred Pound Millionaires (1957) describes how to do the same on canals and inland waterways.

Inspired by the Bermuda Race, he helped create the Fastnet Race in 1925.

Weston Martyr was also a keen archer, writing about his hobby for Blackwood's and other publications. His wife Nora shared the hobby, in 1938 becoming the World Champion.

== Publications ==
- The Southseaman: The Life Story of a Schooner, 1926, William Blackwood and Sons; 1957, as The Southseaman, Rupert Hart-Davis (The Mariners Library); as The Perfect Ship And How We Built Her 1928, Ives Washburn
- Not Without Heat and Dust, 1929
- The £200 millionaire, 1931
- A General Cargo, 1934
- Paradise Enow, 1936
- The Pipe Pushers and other stories, 1938
- The Wandering Years, 1940
