= Emma Gapchenko =

Russian archer (1938–2021)

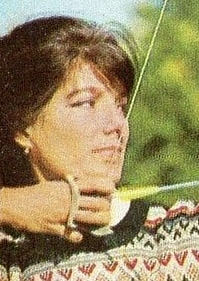
- Gapchenko in 1972

Personal information
- Born: 24 February 1938 Stupino, Russian SFSR, Soviet Union
- Died: 6 December 2021 (aged 83)

Sport
- Sport: Archery
Medal record
Representing Soviet Union
Olympic Games
Bronze medal – third place	1972 Munich	Individual
World Archery Championships
Gold medal – first place	1969 Valley Forge	Team
Gold medal – first place	1971 York	Individual
Gold medal – first place	1973 Grenoble	Team
Bronze medal – third place	1973 Grenoble	Individual

Emma Vasilyevna Gapchenko (Russian: Эмма Васильевна Гапченко; 24 February 1938 – 6 December 2021) was a Russian archer. She won three gold medals at the world championships in 1969–73 and a bronze medal at the 1972 Olympics. At the European championships she won the team gold medal in 1970–74 and individual silvers in 1970 and 1974. She never won a Soviet title.

== Career ==
Gapchenko trained in running, swimming and volleyball before taking up archery at an advanced age of 28. After retiring from competitions she worked as an archery coach and judge.

== Personal life ==
She died on 6 December 2021, at the age of 83.
