= Roy Matthews (archer) =

British archer (1926–1992)

Personal information
- Nationality: British
- Born: 10 September 1926 Hampton in Arden, England
- Died: March 1992 Kidderminster, England

Sport
- Sport: Archery

Roy Matthews (10 September 1926 – March 1992) was a British archer. He competed in the men's individual event at the 1972 Summer Olympics.
