= Maria Mączyńska =

Polish archer (born 1932)

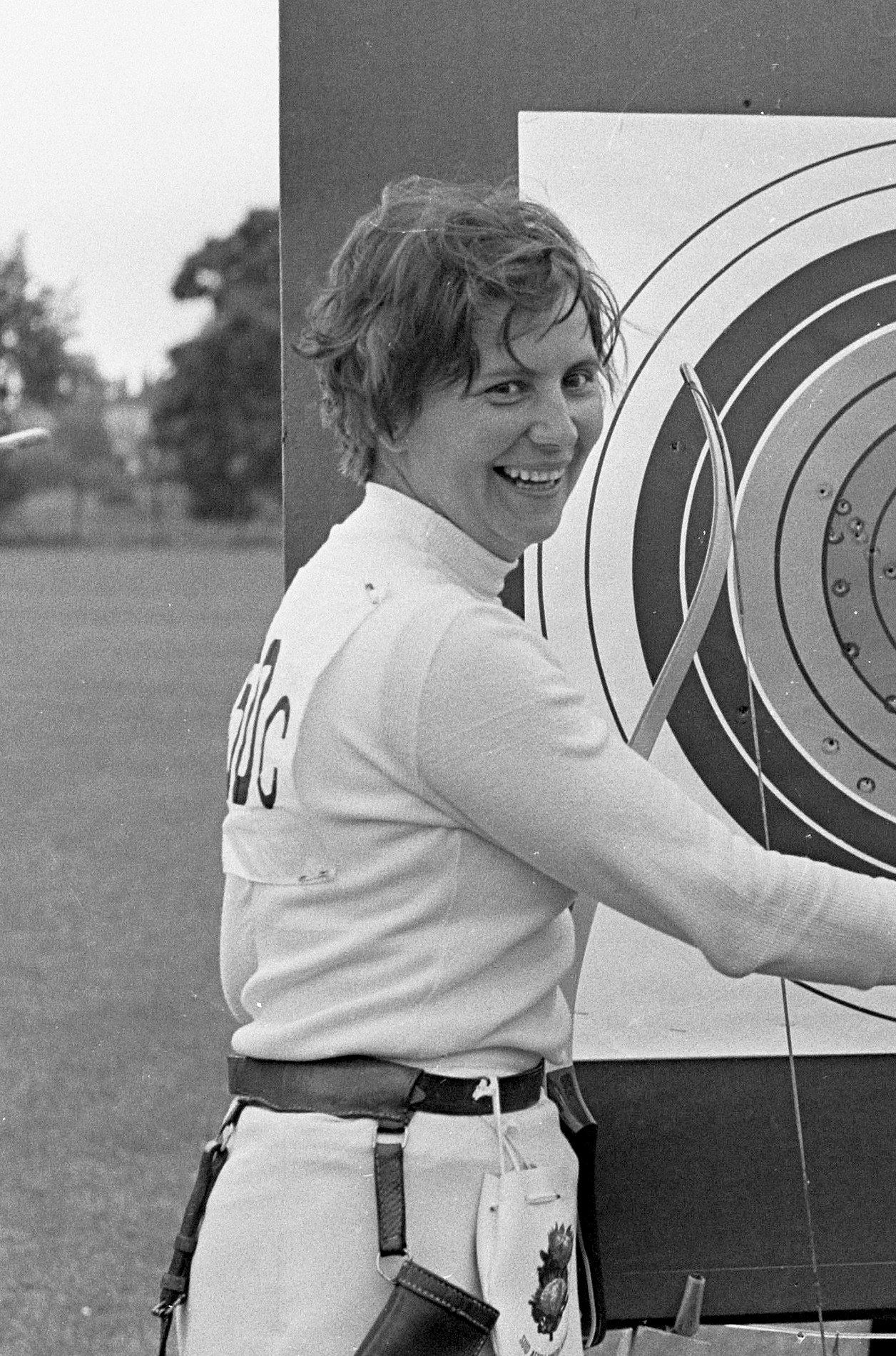
- Maria Mączyńska in 1967

Personal information
- Born: 22 May 1932 (age 94) Opatowiec, Poland
- Height: 1.55 m (5 ft 1 in)
- Weight: 62 kg (137 lb)

Sport
- Sport: Archery
- Club: Marymont Warszawa
Medal record
Representing Poland
World Championships
Gold medal – first place	1967 Amersfort	Individual allround
Gold medal – first place	1967 Amersfort	Team

Maria Mączyńska (born 22 May 1932) is a retired Polish archer. She won the world championships in 1967, both individually and in team competition, and finished in sixth place at the 1972 Summer Olympics, when archery was reintroduced to the Olympic Games.

== Career ==
After graduating in economics in Kraków in 1951 she had a long career in archery, spanning from 1953 to 1979, followed by coaching work. Besides the world allround title in 1967, she was six time national allround champion and won six world titles in individual archery disciplines.

== Personal life ==
She married Stanisław, an engineer, and changed her last name to Cugowska. They have a son Jacek (b. 1963), a painter, and live in Warsaw.
