= Doreen Wilber =

American archer (1930–2008)

Medal record

Women's archery

Representing the United States

Olympic Games
Gold medal – first place	1972 Munich	Individual

Doreen Viola Hansen Wilber (January 8, 1930 – October 19, 2008) was an American archer from Rutland, Iowa.

== Biography ==
At the 1972 Summer Olympics in Munich, Wilber won the gold medal in the women's section of the first modern Olympic archery competition, aged 42. Along with John Williams, Wilber led the U.S. to a sweep of archery gold medals in 1972.

In the first of two FITA rounds (in which an archer shoots 36 arrows at each of 4 distances), Wilber shot for 1198 points out of a possible 1440. This put her in fourth place at the end of the first half of competition. Her second round score of 1226 was the best score of any archer in either round and was enough to put her well above the competition as well as set a new world record.

In the 1969 Outdoor World Championships, Wilber placed 2nd. She was also a member of the 4th place U.S. team. She placed 2nd in the 1971 Outdoor World Championships and was a member of the 3rd place United States team.

She died of Alzheimer's disease in Jefferson, Iowa on October 19, 2008.

== Posthumous honors ==
A bronze statue was erected in 2011 in memory of Wilber, located at the corner of Lincoln Way and Vine St., in Jefferson, Iowa. In 2016 the statue was damaged by "juvenile vandals", but it was repaired later that year.

In 2022, The Des Moines Register made a list of fifty of the best female athletes from Iowa, which included Wilber, to honor fifty years of Title IX.
