= John Williams (archer) =

American archer (born 1953)

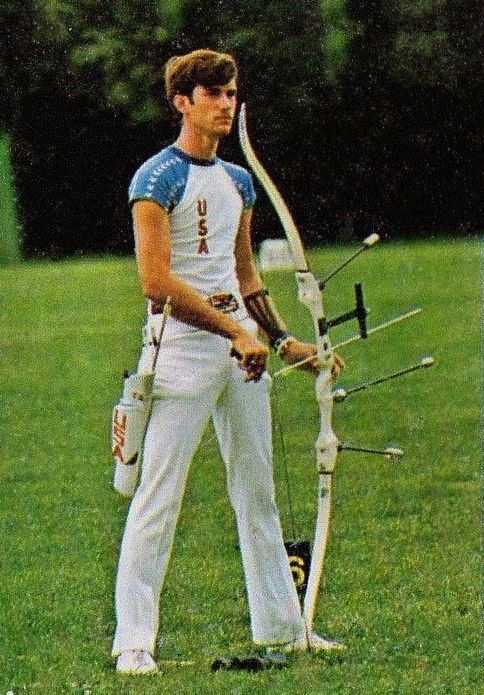

Personal information
- Full name: John Chester Williams
- Born: September 12, 1953 (age 72) Cranesville, Pennsylvania, U.S.
- Education: Northwestern Senior High School (Pennsylvania); Texas A&M University; California State University, San Bernardino
- Employer: Yamaha Corporation
- Height: 189 cm (6 ft 2 in)
- Weight: 73 kg (161 lb)

Sport
- Sport: Archery
- Club: U.S. Army
- Coached by: Clarence Fowkes
Medal record
Representing the United States
Olympic Games
Gold medal – first place	1972 Munich	Individual
World Archery Championships
Silver medal – second place	1969 Valley Forge	Individual
Gold medal – first place	1971 York	Individual
World Field Championships
Gold medal – first place	1972 Gorizia	Individual

John Chester Williams (born September 12, 1953) is a retired archer from the United States. After placing second at the 1969 World Championships he won the 1971 and 1972 world titles and the gold medal at the 1972 Olympics. It was the first Olympic archery medal for the United States in 52 years.

== Career ==
Williams briefly attended Texas A&M University, and graduated in business and management from the California State University, San Bernardino. He later worked as a product manager for the archery division of Yamaha Corporation.

In 2003, the National Archery Association issued him its J. Maurice Thompson award, named after the body's founder, for outstanding and meritorious service to the sport. Northwestern High School has a plaque in the lobby honoring John Williams.
