= World Archery =

International archery governing body

- Abbreviation: WA (formerly FITA)
- Formation: 4 September 1931; 95 years ago
- Founded at: Lwow, Poland (today Lviv, Ukraine)
- Type: Federation of national associations
- Headquarters: Lausanne, Switzerland
- Region served: Worldwide
- Members: 159 national and other associations
- Official language: English
- President: Greg Easton
- First Vice-president: Jörg Brokamp
- Affiliations: International Olympic Committee, International World Games Association
- Website: worldarchery.sport

World Archery (WA, formerly Fédération Internationale de Tir à l'Arc – FITA) is the governing body of the sport of archery. It is based in Lausanne, Switzerland. It is composed of 156 national federations and other archery associations, and is recognised by the International Olympic Committee.

== History ==
FITA was founded on 4 September 1931 in Lwow, Poland (today Lviv, Ukraine). Its seven founding member states were France, Czechoslovakia, Sweden, Poland, the United States, Hungary, and Italy. The aim of the organization was to create regular archery championships, and to return archery to the Olympic Games (the sport had not been featured since 1920). FITA was finally successful in returning archery to the Olympic program in the 1972 Summer Olympics.

To celebrate the organization's 80th anniversary in July 2011, a large majority of the FITA Congress voted to change the name from FITA to the World Archery or WA.

In March 2022, in the wake of the 2022 Russian invasion of Ukraine, the federation announced that no athlete, team official, or technical official from Russia or Belarus will be permitted to participate in any international archery event, their flags and anthems are banned, and no archery events would be held in the two countries.

In July 2023, on the question that whether or not to re-allow athletics with Russian and/or Belarusian passports to participant international archery competitions under neutral identities, World Archery asked both national archery federations to submit personal data for investigations, as both federations denied to complete such requirements, WA said that it's unlikely to allow neutral athletes unless once procedure can be completely followed.

In December 2023, World Archery launched its own OTT Service with a subscription video on demand model and live streaming of main events.

The organization announced in 2024 that the 2025 world cup final would be held in Nanjing, China before moving to Mexico for 2026 through 2028.

== Identity ==
=== Flag ===
World Archery
- Use: Sport
- Proportion: 3:5
- Adopted: 1 April 2012
- Design: White field with a WA logo

The WA flag has a white background, with the organization's logo in the middle.

== Member associations ==
As of April 2019, 159 national federations and other associations are members of World Archery.

- Albania
- Algeria
- Andorra
- Argentina
- Armenia
- American Samoa
- Australia
- Austria
- Azerbaijan
- Bahamas
- Bangladesh
- Barbados
- Belgium
- Benin
- Bermuda
- Belarus
- Bhutan
- Bosnia-Herzegovina
- Brazil
- British Virgin Islands
- Bulgaria
- Cameroon
- Central African Republic
- Cambodia
- Canada
- Chad
- Chile
- China
- Colombia
- Comoros
- Costa Rica
- Côte d'Ivoire
- Croatia
- Cuba
- Cyprus
- Czech Republic
- DR Congo
- Denmark
- Dominica
- Dominican Republic
- Ecuador
- Egypt
- El Salvador
- Eritrea
- Estonia
- Falkland Islands
- Faroe Islands
- Fiji
- Finland
- France
- Gabon
- Georgia
- Germany
- Ghana
- Great Britain
- Greece
- Guatemala
- Guinea
- Haiti
- Honduras
- Hong Kong, China
- Hungary
- Iceland
- India
- Indonesia
- Iran
- Iraq
- Ireland
- Israel
- Italy
- Japan
- Kazakhstan
- Kenya
- Kiribati
- Kosovo
- Kuwait
- Kyrgyzstan
- Laos
- Latvia
- Lebanon
- Libya
- Liechtenstein
- Lithuania
- Luxembourg
- Macau
- Macedonia
- Malawi
- Malaysia
- Malta
- Mauritania
- Mauritius
- Mexico
- Moldova
- Monaco
- Montenegro
- Mongolia
- Morocco
- Myanmar
- Namibia
- Nepal
- Netherlands
- New Zealand
- Nicaragua
- Niger
- Nigeria
- Norfolk Island
- North Korea
- Norway
- Pakistan
- Palau
- Panama
- Papua New Guinea
- Paraguay
- Peru
- Philippines
- Poland
- Portugal
- Puerto Rico
- Qatar
- Romania
- Russia
- Rwanda
- Saint Kitts and Nevis
- Samoa
- San Marino
- Saudi Arabia
- Senegal
- Serbia
- Sierra Leone
- Singapore
- Slovakia
- Slovenia
- Somalia
- South Africa
- South Korea
- Spain
- Sri Lanka
- Sudan
- Suriname
- Sweden
- Switzerland
- Tahiti
- Chinese Taipei (Taiwan)
- Tajikistan
- Thailand
- Togo
- Tonga
- Trinidad and Tobago
- Tunisia
- Turkey
- Uganda
- Ukraine
- United States
- Uruguay
- Uzbekistan
- Vanuatu
- Venezuela
- Vietnam
- US Virgin Islands
- Zimbabwe

== Rankings ==
World Archery publishes world rankings for each category of outdoor competitive archery (men / women; recurve / compound; individual / team / mixed team), updated following every official eligible event.

Each archer earns a ranking score for each competition. The ranking scores are calculated through a combination of the ranking factor of the tournament (as determined by the quality of competition, the number of competitors, and how recently the competition took place) and points based on the competitor's final position in the competition. The archer's four highest ranking scores are then combined to form their 'Added Ranking Score', which forms the basis of the ranking list.

=== Current rankings ===
Current number one ranked archers
Outdoor
Discipline	Men	Women	Men's Team	Women's Team	Mixed Team
Recurve	Brady Ellison (USA)	Lim Si-hyeon (KOR)	South Korea	South Korea	South Korea
Compound	Mathias Fullerton (DEN)	Andrea Becerra (MEX)	India	Mexico	India
Last Updated: 30 September 2025

== Editions ==
The following table shows the venue of all World Championships on the current World Archery programme:

Denotes inaugural event

Year	World Championships						
Year	Outdoor	Indoor	Youth	Para	Field	University	3D
1931	(Poland) Lwów						
1932	(Poland) Warsaw						
1933	(United Kingdom) London						
1934	(Sweden) Båstad						
1935	(Belgium) Brussels						
1936	(Czechoslovakia) Prague						
1937	(France) Paris						
1938	(United Kingdom) London						
1939	(Norway) Oslo						
1946	(Sweden) Stockholm						
1947	(Czechoslovakia) Prague						
1948	(United Kingdom) London						
1949	(France) Paris						
1950	(Denmark) Copenhagen						
1952	(Belgium) Brussels						
1953	(Norway) Oslo						
1955	(Finland) Helsinki						
1957	(Czechoslovakia) Prague						
1958	(Belgium) Brussels						
1959	(Sweden) Stockholm						
1960							
1961	(Norway) Oslo						
1962							
1963	(Finland) Helsinki						
1965	(Sweden) Västerås						
1966							
1967	(Netherlands) Amersfoort						
1968							
1969	(United States) Valley Forge				(United States) Valley Forge		
1970							
1971	(United Kingdom) York				(United Kingdom) Cardiff		
1973	(France) Grenoble						
1974					(Socialist Federal Republic of Yugoslavia) Zagreb		
1975	(Switzerland) Interlaken						
1977	(Australia) Canberra						
1979	(West Germany) Berlin						
1981	(Italy) Punta Ala						
1982					(United Kingdom) Kingsclere		
1983	(United States) Los Angeles						
1984					(Finland) Hyvinkää		
1985	(South Korea) Seoul						
1986					(Austria) Radstadt		
1987	(Australia) Adelaide						
1989	(Switzerland) Lausanne						
1990					(Norway) Loen		
1991	(Poland) Kraków	(Finland) Oulu	(Norway) Sandefjord				
1992					(Netherlands) Margraten		
1993	(Turkey) Antalya	(France) Perpignan	(France) Moliets-et-Maa				
1994			(Italy) Roncegno		(France) Vertus		
1995	(Indonesia) Jakarta	(United Kingdom) Birmingham					
1996			(United States) Chula Vista		(Slovenia) Kranjska Gora	(France) Vaulx-en-Velin	
1997	(Canada) Victoria	(Turkey) Istanbul					
1998			(Sweden) Sunne	(England) Stoke Mandeville	(Austria) Obergurgl	Taoyuan	
1999	(France) Riom	(Cuba) Havana		(New Zealand) Christchurch			
2000			(France) Belfort		(Italy) Cortina d'Ampezzo	(Spain) Madrid	
2001	(China) Beijing	(Italy) Florence		(Czech Republic) Nymburk			
2002			(Czech Republic) Nymburk		(Australia) Canberra	(Thailand) Chonburi	
2003	(United States) New York	(France) Nîmes		(Spain) Madrid			(France) Sully-sur-Loire
2004			(United Kingdom) Lilleshall		(Croatia) Plitvice	(Spain) Madrid	
2005	(Spain) Madrid	(Denmark) Aalborg		(Italy) Massa Carrara			(Italy) Genoa
2006			(Mexico) Mérida		(Sweden) Gothenburg	(Slovakia) Viničné	
2007	(Germany) Leipzig	(Turkey) İzmir		(South Korea) Cheongju			(Hungary) Sopron
2008			(Turkey) Antalya		(United Kingdom) Llwynypia	Tainan	
2009	(South Korea) Ulsan	(Poland) Rzeszów	(United States) Ogden	(Czech Republic) Nymburk			(Italy) Latina
2010					(Hungary) Visegrád	(China) Shenzhen	
2011	(Italy) Turin		(Poland) Legnica	(Italy) Turin			(Austria) Donnersbach
2012		(United States); Las Vegas					
2013	(Turkey) Belek		(China) Wuxi	(Thailand) Bangkok			(Italy) Sassari
2014		(France); Nîmes					
2015	(Denmark) Copenhagen		(United States) Yankton	(Germany) Donaueschingen			(Italy) Terni
2016		(Turkey); Ankara					
2017	Mexico City		(Argentina) Rosario	(China) Beijing			(Poland) Wrocław
2018		(United States); Yankton					
2019	(Netherlands) 's-Hertogenbosch		(Spain) Madrid	(Netherlands) 's-Hertogenbosch			(Canada) Lac La Biche
2021	(United States) Yankton		(Poland) Wrocław		(United States) Yankton		
2022				(United Arab Emirates) Dubai			(Italy) Terni
2023	(Germany) Berlin		(Republic of Ireland) Limerick	(Czech Republic) Plzeň			
2024					(Canada) Lac La Biche		(Slovenia) Mokrice
2025	(South Korea) Gwangju		(Canada) Winnipeg	(South Korea) Gwangju			
2026					Yankton		Yankton

== Tournaments ==
=== Summer Olympics ===
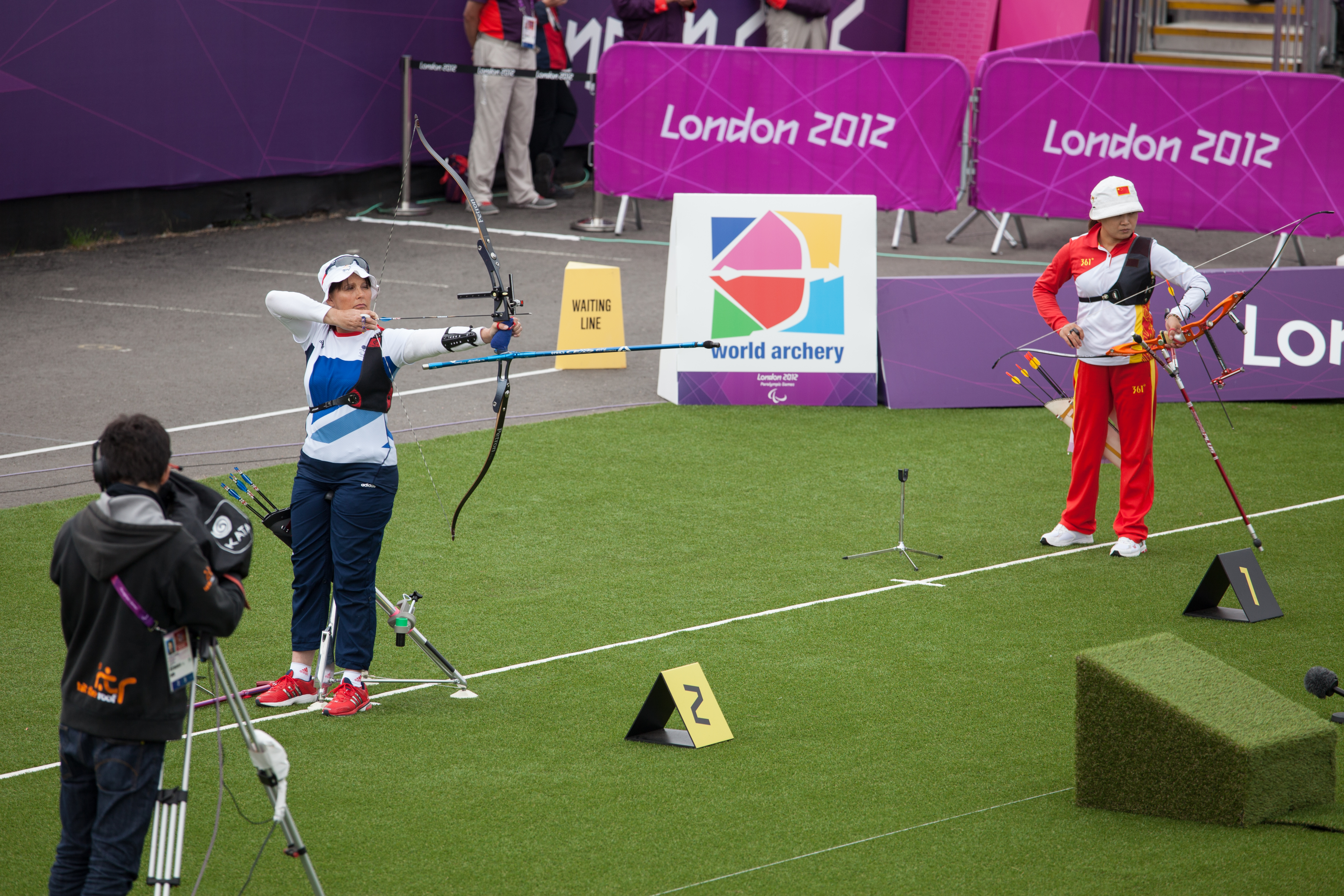
Sharon Vennard and Yan Huilian at the 2012 Summer Paralympics

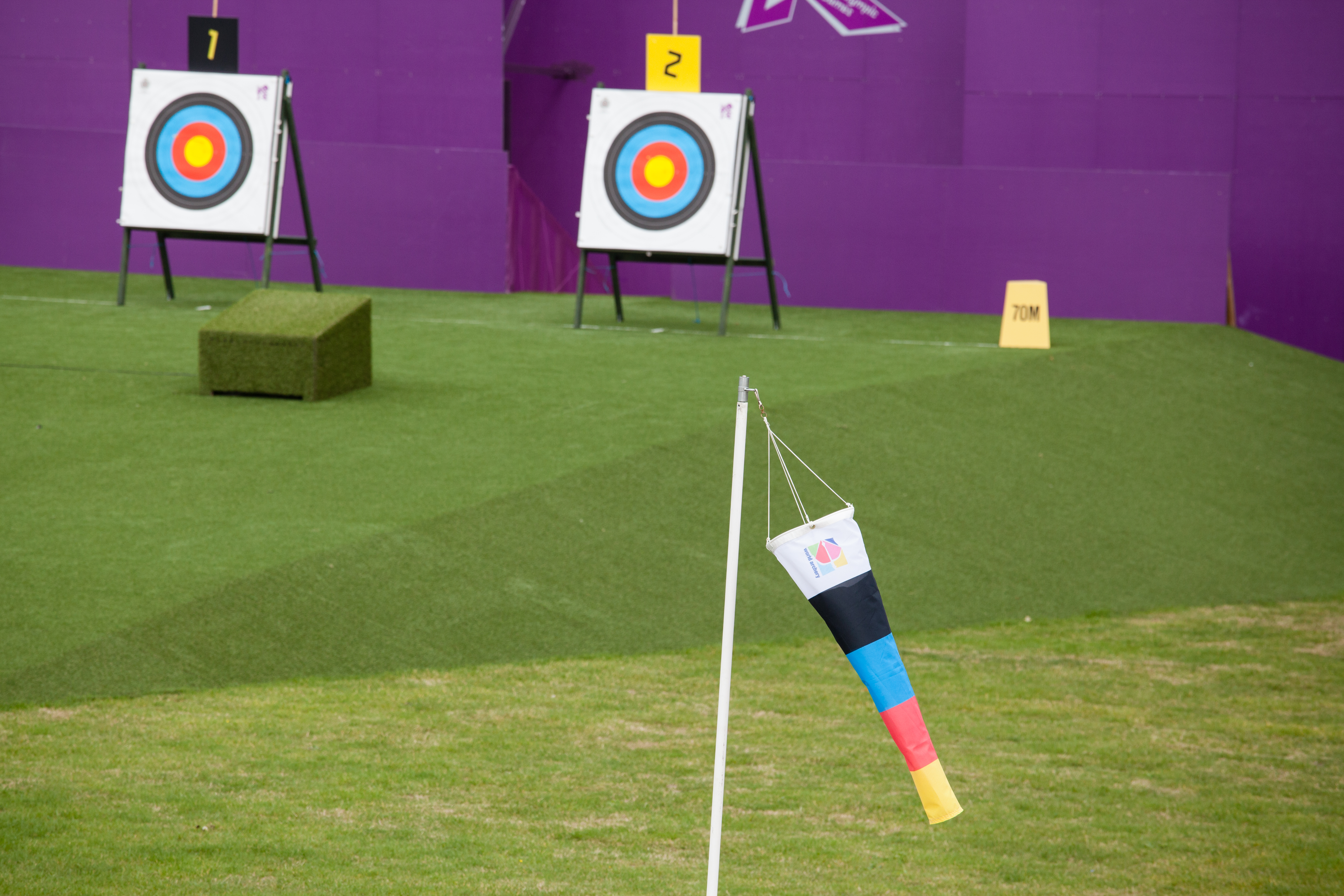
Some targets and a windsock at the 2012 Summer Paralympics

Archery was first competed at the Summer Olympic Games in 1900 and, after a long hiatus from 1924, became a regular event from 1972. Team events were added in 1988. Recurve archery is currently the only discipline competed at the Olympics.

Archery is also competed at the Summer Paralympics (recurve and compound disciplines), the Youth Olympic Games (recurve only), and the World Games (Field archery only).

=== World Championships ===
- World Target Championships
  - World Outdoor Archery Championships
  - World Indoor Archery Championships
- World Field Archery Championships
- World Archery 3D Championships
- World Para Archery Championships
- World Youth Archery Championships
- World University Archery Championships
- World Ski Archery Championships

FITA began holding Target World Championships in 1931. They were held every year until 1959, when the Championships became biennial events. 1959 was also the first year that FITA held the World Field Championship.

Presently, there are five principal formats of the World Archery Championships: Outdoor, Indoor, Youth, Para-Archery, and Field. Each is held every two years on different rotations. World Championships are also held every two years in 3D archery and University sport. In 2007, a ski archery World Championships was held in Moscow; this is yet to be repeated and is not included in the current rotation.

Number	Events	First	Last
1	World Outdoor Archery Championships	1931	2025 (53rd)
2	World Indoor Target Championships	1991	2018 (14th)
3	World Field Archery Championships	1969	2026 (29th)
4	World Archery 3D Championships	2003	2026 (12th)
5	World Ski Archery Championships	1999	2017 (10th)
6	World Para Archery Championships	1998	2025 (15th)
7	World Youth Archery Championships	1991	2025 (19th)
8	World University Archery Championships	1996	2016 (11th)

=== World Cup ===
The Archery World Cup is an annual outdoor event that was inaugurated in 2006. It is designed to present archery in 'spectacular' locations.

The format consists of 4 rounds competed across the world during a calendar year. The best individual and mixed team performers across these rounds are then invited to compete in the World Cup Final at the end of the year.

=== World Series ===
The Indoor Archery World Series is an annual indoor archery circuit founded by World Archery. The calendar includes seven events held across Europe, Asia, South America, and North America. These events can be worth 250 or 1,000 points for the winner of each event, establishing a points ranking that will determine the overall winner.

=== Other ===
Archery is an optional sport at the Universiade and the Commonwealth Games.

=== Current champions ===
The following archers are the current champions of the major World Archery Federation events:

Discipline	Event	Summer Olympics 2024	World Championships 2025	World Cup Series Final 2025
Recurve	Men's Individual	Kim Woo-jin (KOR)	Andrés Temiño (ESP)	Kim Woo-jin (KOR)
Recurve	Women's Individual	Lim Si-hyeon (KOR)	TBD	Li Jiaman (CHN)
Recurve	Men's Team	South Korea; Kim Je-deok; Kim Woo-jin; Lee Woo-seok	South Korea; Kim Je-deok; Kim Woo-jin; Lee Woo-seok	
Recurve	Women's Team	South Korea; Jeon Hun-young; Lim Si-hyeon; Nam Su-hyeon	Chinese Taipei; Chiu Yi-ching; Hsu Hsin-tzu; Li Cai-xuan	
Recurve	Mixed Team	South Korea; Lim Si-hyeon; Kim Woo-jin	Spain; Elia Canales; Andrés Temiño	
Compound	Men's Individual		Nicolas Girard (FRA)	James Lutz (USA)
Compound	Women's Individual		Andrea Becerra (MEX)	Mariana Bernal (MEX)
Compound	Men's Team		India; Prathamesh Fuge; Aman Saini; Rishabh Yadav	
Compound	Women's Team		Mexico; Andrea Becerra; Mariana Bernal; Adriana Castillo	
Compound	Mixed Team		Netherlands; Sanne de Laat; Mike Schloesser	

== Presidents ==
Period	Name	Country
1931	Mieczysław Fularski	Poland
1931 – 1939	Bronisław Pierzchała	Poland
1946 – 1949	Paul Demare	France
1949 – 1957	Henry Kjellson	Sweden
1957 – 1961	Oscar Kessels	Belgium
1961 – 1977	Inger Kristine Frith	Great Britain
1977 – 1989	Francesco Gnecchi-Ruscone	Italy
1989 – 2005	James L. Easton	United States
2005 – 2025	Uğur Erdener	Turkey
2025 –	Greg Easton	United States

== See also ==
- List of shooting sports organizations
