= Field archery at the World Games =

Field archery was introduced as a World Games sport at the 1985 World Games in London. At the 2013 World Games in Cali the field compound even was replaced with an outdoor target event.

== Field archery ==
=== Men ===
==== Recurve ====
Until 1993 this event was called freestyle.

Games	Gold	Silver	Bronze
1985 London	Göran Bjerendal (SWE)	Francis Notenboom (BEL)	Tommy Quick (SWE)
1989 Karlsruhe	Francis Notenboom (BEL)	Jay Barrs (USA)	Ole Gammelgaard (DEN)
1993 The Hague	Andrea Parenti (ITA)	Paul Vermeiren (BEL)	Martinus Grov (NOR)
1997 Lahti	Sven Giesa (GER)	Andrea Parenti (ITA)	Fulvio Verdecchia (ITA)
2001 Akita	Jay Barrs (USA)	Michele Frangilli (ITA)	Fulvio Verdecchia (ITA)
2005 Duisburg	Michele Frangilli (ITA)	Alan Wills (GBR)	Alvise Bertolini (ITA)
2009 Kaohsiung	Vic Wunderle (USA)	Michele Frangilli (ITA)	Sebastian Rohrberg (GER)
2013 Cali	Jean-Charles Valladont (FRA)	Brady Ellison (USA)	Alan Wills (GBR)
2017 Wrocław	Amedeo Tonelli (ITA)	Brady Ellison (USA)	Wataru Oonuki (JPN)

==== Compound ====
Games	Gold	Silver	Bronze
1993 The Hague	Morgan Lundin (SWE)	Dominique Guyon (FRA)	Jean-Paul Laury (FRA)
1997 Lahti	Morgan Lundin (SWE)	Niels Baldur (DEN)	Peter Penner (GER)
2001 Akita	Dave Cousins (USA)	Björn Andersson (SWE)	Hervé Dardant (FRA)
2005 Duisburg	Morgan Lundin (SWE)	Dejan Sitar (SLO)	Dave Cousins (USA)
2009 Kaohsiung	Kelvin Wilkey (USA)	Alessandro Lodetti (ITA)	Christopher White (GBR)

==== Barebow ====
Games	Gold	Silver	Bronze
1985 London	Anders Rosenberg (SWE)	Roy Mundon (GBR)	Philip Bowen (GBR)
1989 Karlsruhe	Wolfgang Sedmak (AUT)	Janne Hilli (FIN)	Cesare Rampi (ITA)
1993 The Hague	Twan Cleven (NED)	Roy Mundon (GBR)	Mattias Fallgren (SWE)
1997 Lahti	Mattias Larsson (SWE)	Rensco van Wees (NED)	Alessandro Gaudethi (ITA)
2001 Akita	Erik Jonsson (SWE)	Žare Krajnc (SLO)	Mattias Larsson (SWE)
2005 Duisburg	Erik Jonsson (SWE)	Mario Orlandi (ITA)	Mattias Larsson (SWE)
2009 Kaohsiung	Giuseppe Seimandi (ITA)	Pasi Ahjokivi (FIN)	Sergio Massimo Cassiani (ITA)
2013 Cali	Giuseppe Seimandi (ITA)	David Garcia Fernandez (ESP)	Bobby Larsson (SWE)
2017 Wrocław	István Kakas (HUN)	John Demmer III (USA)	Martin Ottosson (SWE)

=== Women ===
==== Recurve ====
Until 1993 this event was called freestyle.

Games	Gold	Silver	Bronze
1985 London	Lisa Buscombe (ITA)	Sandra Thompson (AUS)	Reinhild Weinlich (GER)
1989 Karlsruhe	Catherine Pellen (FRA)	Ursula Sedmak (AUT)	Liselotte Svensson (SWE)
1993 The Hague	Monica Angeli (ITA)	Catherine Pellen (FRA)	Liselotte Andersson (SWE)
1997 Lahti	Ingrid Kihlander (SWE)	Liselotte Andersson (SWE)	Hedi Mittermaier (GER)
2001 Akita	Carole Ferriou (FRA)	Elisabeth Grube (AUT)	Laure Barczynski (FRA)
2005 Duisburg	Petra Ericsson (SWE)	Laure Barczynski (FRA)	Laurence Pecqueux (FRA)
2009 Kaohsiung	Carole Ferriou (FRA)	Jessica Tomasi (ITA)	Naomi Folkard (GBR)
2013 Cali	Naomi Folkard (GBR)	Elena Richter (GER)	Jessica Tomasi (ITA)
2017 Wrocław	Lisa Unruh (GER)	Naomi Folkard (GBR)	Jessica Tomasi (ITA)

==== Compound ====
Games	Gold	Silver	Bronze
1993 The Hague	Catharine Chapelin (FRA)	Carmen Ceriotti (ITA)	Fabiola Palazzini (ITA)
1997 Lahti	Petra Ericsson (SWE)	Mari Henriksen (DEN)	Jozica Emersic (SLO)
2001 Akita	Michelle Ragsdale (USA)	Giorgia Solato (ITA)	Françoise Valle (FRA)
2005 Duisburg	Martina Schacht (GER)	Jamie Van Natta (USA)	Petra Friedl (AUT)
2009 Kaohsiung	Petra Göbel (AUT)	Ingeborg Enthoven-Mokkenstorm (NED)	Ivana Buden (CRO)

==== Barebow ====
Games	Gold	Silver	Bronze
1985 London	Kornelia Fili (AUT)	Giuseppina Meini (ITA)	Lavina Bottazzi (ITA)
1989 Karlsruhe	Nadine Visconti (FRA)	Giuseppina Meini (ITA)	Clara Admiral (NED)
1993 The Hague	Patricia Lovell (GBR)	Marie Palm (SWE)	Anna Maria Bianchi (ITA)
1997 Lahti	Jutta Schneider (GER)	Patricia Lovell (GBR)	Cristina Pugnaghi (ITA)
2001 Akita	Barbara Guiducci (ITA)	Patricia Lovell (GBR)	Odile Boussière (FRA)
2005 Duisburg	Monika Jentges (GER)	Reingild Linhart (AUT)	Luciana Pennacchi (ITA)
2009 Kaohsiung	Eleonora Strobbe (ITA)	Christine Gauthe (FRA)	Monika Jentges (GER)
2013 Cali	Lina Björklund (SWE)	Andrea Raigel (AUT)	Eleonora Strobbe (ITA)
2017 Wrocław	Cinzia Noziglia (ITA)	Lina Björklund (SWE)	Martina Macková (CZE)

== Outdoor archery ==
=== Men ===
==== Compound ====
Games	Gold	Silver	Bronze
2013 Cali	Reo Wilde (USA)	Pierre Julien Deloche (FRA)	Roberto Hernández (ESA)
2017 Wrocław	Stephan Hansen (DEN)	Esmaeil Ebadi (IRI)	Domagoj Buden (CRO)

=== Women ===
==== Compound ====
Games	Gold	Silver	Bronze
2013 Cali	Erika Jones (USA)	Camilla Søemod (DEN)	Sara López (COL)
2017 Wrocław	Sara López (COL)	Toja Ellison (SLO)	Christie Colin (USA)

=== Mixed ===
==== Compound Team ====
Games	Gold	Silver	Bronze
2013	United States (USA); Erika Jones; Reo Wilde	Italy (ITA); Marcella Tonioli; Sergio Pagni	Germany (GER); Kristina Berger; Paul Titscher
2017	Denmark (DEN); Stephan Hansen; Sarah Sönnichsen	Mexico (MEX); Rodolfo González; Linda Ochoa	United States (USA); Cassidy Cox; Kris Schaff
2022	Colombia (COL); Sara López; Daniel Muñoz	Netherlands (NED); Jody Beckers; Mike Schloesser	India (IND); Jyothi Surekha Vennam; Abhishek Verma
2025	Denmark (DEN); Mathias Fullerton; Sofie Marcussen	Mexico (MEX); Andrea Becerra; Sebastian Garcia Flores	United States (USA); Alexis Ruiz; Curtis Broadnax
