= World Archery Championships =

Series of international sports competitions

- Status: Active
- Genre: World Championship
- Date: Varying
- Frequency: Biennial
- Country: Varying
- Inaugurated: 1931
- Previous event: 2025 Gwangju
- Next event: 2027 Medellín
- Organiser: World Archery Federation

The World Archery Championships are a series of competitions in Archery organised by the World Archery Federation. The first competition held under that title took place in 1931.

Competition archery takes a wide variety of formats, but the title World Championships is commonly reserved for the following three events:

1. Outdoor World Championships in target Archery
2. Indoor World Championships in target Archery
3. World Championships in field Archery.

Of these, the Outdoor World Championships in target Archery is most commonly referred to as simply the 'World Archery Championships', and the winners most commonly referred to as simply "world champions". Events in those outdoor championships are held involving fixed targets at set distances, using a variety of bows, the recurve bow from 1931 and the compound bow since 1995.

Although less widely recognised, World Championship events are also held in Youth archery (outdoor only - field and indoor youth events are held alongside the senior championships), Para-archery, University archery and 3D archery. A ski archery World Championships was last held in 2007, but is not part of the current rotation. Following the accession of archery to permanent sports at the Summer Universiade, the university world championships also ceased to be part of the World Archery Championships rotation in 2014.

== World Archery Championships Events ==
Number	Events	First	Last
1	World Archery Championships	1931	2025 (53rd)
2	World Indoor Archery Championships	1991	2018 (14th)
3	World Field Archery Championships	1969	2024 (28th)
4	World 3D Archery Championships	2003	2024 (11th)
5	World Para Archery Championships	1998	2025 (15th)
6	World Archery Youth Championships	1991	2025 (19th)
7	World University Archery Championships	1996	2016 (11th)
8	World Ski Archery Championships	1999	2017 (10th)

And for the divisions as defined in their respective chapters:

- World Archery Flight Championships;
- World Archery Ski Championships;
- World Archery Run Championships.

Despite the above provision, a World Championship does not have to be awarded if the executive board determines it is not appropriate.

== Outdoor ==
Number	Year	Location	Events
1	1931	(Poland) Lwów	2
2	1932	(Poland) Warsaw	2
3	1933	(United Kingdom) London	4
4	1934	(Sweden) Båstad	4
5	1935	(Belgium) Brussels	4
6	1936	(Czechoslovakia) Prague	4
7	1937	(France) Paris	4
8	1938	(United Kingdom) London	4
9	1939	(Norway) Oslo	4
10	1946	(Sweden) Stockholm	4
11	1947	(Czechoslovakia) Prague	4
12	1948	(United Kingdom) London	4
13	1949	(France) Paris	4
14	1950	(Denmark) Copenhagen	4
15	1952	(Belgium) Brussels	4
16	1954	(Norway) Oslo	4
17	1955	(Finland) Helsinki	4
18	1957	(Czechoslovakia) Prague	4
19	1958	(Belgium) Brussels	4
20	1959	(Sweden) Stockholm	4
21	1961	(Norway) Oslo	4
22	1963	(Finland) Helsinki	4
23	1965	(Sweden) Västerås	4
24	1967	(Netherlands) Amersfoort	4
25	1969	(United States) Valley Forge	4
26	1971	(United Kingdom) York	4
27	1973	(France) Grenoble	4
28	1975	(Switzerland) Interlaken	4
29	1977	(Australia) Canberra	4
30	1979	(West Germany) West Berlin	4
31	1981	(Italy) Punta Ala	4
32	1983	(United States) Los Angeles	4
33	1985	(South Korea) Seoul	4
34	1987	(Australia) Adelaide	4
35	1989	(Switzerland) Lausanne	4
36	1991	(Poland) Kraków	4
37	1993	(Turkey) Antalya	4
38	1995	(Indonesia) Jakarta	8
39	1997	(Canada) Victoria	8
40	1999	(France) Riom	8
41	2001	(China) Beijing	8
42	2003	(United States) New York	8
43	2005	(Spain) Madrid	8
44	2007	(Germany) Leipzig	8
45	2009	(South Korea) Ulsan	8
46	2011	(Italy) Turin	10
47	2013	(Turkey) Antalya	10
48	2015	(Denmark) Copenhagen	10
49	2017	Mexico City	10
50	2019	(Netherlands) 's-Hertogenbosch	10
51	2021	(United States) Yankton	10
52	2023	(Germany) Berlin	10
53	2025	(South Korea) Gwangju	10

=== All-time medal table (1931–2025) ===
Updated after the 2025 World Archery Championships.

Rank	Nation	Gold	Silver	Bronze	Total
1	South Korea	68	27	31	126
2	United States	65	41	34	140
3	China	33	26	27	86
4	Sweden	19	22	23	64
5	Poland	18	16	12	46
6	Soviet Union	14	9	4	27
7	Great Britain	11	19	26	56
8	Italy	11	9	9	29
9	France	10	17	16	43
10	Denmark	7	14	9	30
11	Czechoslovakia	7	5	9	21
12	Russia	7	5	6	18
13	Finland	6	12	10	28
14	Belgium	5	9	9	23
15	Chinese Taipei	5	6	7	18
16	Colombia	5	1	4	10
17	India	4	10	3	17
18	Canada	3	3	6	12
19	Netherlands	2	8	7	17
20	Mexico	2	8	3	13
21	Germany	2	7	4	13
22	Australia	2	2	9	13
23	Spain	2	1	0	3
24	Turkey	1	4	3	8
25	Norway	1	4	1	6
26	West Germany	1	3	1	5
27	Ukraine	1	2	4	7
28	Hungary	1	1	1	3
29	Iran	1	1	0	2
30	Slovenia	1	0	2	3
31	Austria	1	0	1	2
32	Chile	1	0	0	1
32	Czech Republic	1	0	0	1
32	Moldova	1	0	0	1
35	Japan	0	6	8	14
36	South Africa	0	3	5	8
37	Brazil	0	2	1	3
38	El Salvador	0	1	1	2
38	North Korea	0	1	1	2
40	Belarus	0	1	0	1
40	Croatia	0	1	0	1
40	Georgia	0	1	0	1
40	Malaysia	0	1	0	1
40	Russian Archery Federation	0	1	0	1
45	Kazakhstan	0	0	2	2
46	Bangladesh	0	0	1	1
46	Estonia	0	0	1	1
46	Indonesia	0	0	1	1
46	Luxembourg	0	0	1	1
46	New Zealand	0	0	1	1
46	Venezuela	0	0	1	1
Totals (51 entries)		319	310	305	934

== Indoor ==
Number	Year	Location	Events
1	1991	(Finland) Oulu	4
2	1993	(France) Perpignan	4
3	1995	(United Kingdom) Birmingham	8
4	1997	(Turkey) Istanbul	8
5	1999	(Cuba) Havana	8
6	2001	(Italy) Florence	8
7	2003	(France) Nîmes	8
8	2005	(Denmark) Aalborg	8
9	2007	(Turkey) İzmir	16
10	2009	(Poland) Rzeszów	16
11	2012	(United States) Las Vegas	16
12	2014	(France) Nîmes	16
13	2016	(Turkey) Ankara	16
14	2018	(United States) Yankton	16

== Para ==
Number	Year	Location	Events
1	1998	(United Kingdom) Stoke Mandeville	
2	1999	(New Zealand) Christchurch	
3	2001	(Czech Republic) Nymburk	
4	2003	(Spain) Madrid	
5	2005	(Italy) Massa Carrara	
6	2007	(South Korea) Cheongju	
7	2009	(Czech Republic) Nymburk	
8	2011	(Italy) Turin	
9	2013	(Thailand) Bangkok	
10	2015	(Germany) Donaueschingen	
11	2017	(China) Beijing	
12	2019	(Netherlands) 's-Hertogenbosch	
13	2022	(United Arab Emirates) Dubai	16
14	2023	(Czech Republic) Plzeň	17
15	2025	(South Korea) Gwangju	

- https://www.ianseo.net/Details.php?toId=818 - 2015
- http://ianseo.net/Details.php?toId=2040 - 2017

== Youth ==
Number	Year	Location	Events
1	1991	(Norway) Sandefjord	
2	1993	(France) Moliets-et-Maa	
3	1994	(Italy) Roncegno	
4	1996	(United States) Chula Vista	
5	1998	(Sweden) Sunne	
6	2000	(France) Belfort	
7	2002	(Czech Republic) Nymburk	
8	2004	(England) Lilleshall	
9	2006	(Mexico) Mérida	
10	2008	(Turkey) Antalya	
11	2009	(United States) Ogden	
12	2011	(Poland) Legnica	
13	2013	(China) Wuxi	20
14	2015	(United States) Yankton	20
15	2017	(Argentina) Rosario	20
16	2019	(Spain) Madrid	20
17	2021	(Poland) Wrocław	20
18	2023	(Republic of Ireland) Limerick	20
19	2025	(Canada) Winnipeg	20

== Field ==
Number	Year	Location	Events
1	1969	(United States) Valley Forge	
2	1971	(United Kingdom) Cardiff	
3	1972	(Italy) Gorizia	
4	1974	(Socialist Federal Republic of Yugoslavia) Zagreb	
5	1976	(Sweden) Mölndal	
6	1978	(Switzerland) Geneva	
7	1980	(New Zealand) Palmerston North	
8	1982	(United Kingdom) Kingsclere	
9	1984	(Finland) Hyvinkää	
10	1986	(Austria) Radstadt	
11	1988	(Italy) Bolzano	
12	1990	(Norway) Loen	
13	1992	(Netherlands) Margraten	
14	1994	(France) Vertus	
15	1996	(Slovenia) Kranjska Gora	
16	1998	(Austria) Obergurgl	
17	2000	(Italy) Cortina	
18	2002	(Australia) Canberra	
19	2004	(Croatia) Plitvice	
20	2006	(Sweden) Gothenburg	
21	2008	(United Kingdom) Llwynypia	
22	2010	(Hungary) Visegrád	
23	2012	(France) Val d'Isère	
24	2014	(Croatia) Zagreb	
25	2016	(Republic of Ireland) Dublin	
26	2018	(Italy) Cortina	
27	2021	(United States) Yankton	
28	2024	(Canada) Lac La Biche	

== 3D ==
Number	Year	Location	Events
1	2003	(France) Sully-sur-Loire	8
2	2005	(Italy) Genoa	8
3	2007	(Hungary) Sopron	10
4	2009	(Italy) Latina	10
5	2011	(Austria) Donnersbach	10
6	2013	(Italy) Sassari	10
7	2015	(Italy) Terni	10
8	2017	(France) Avignon	10
9	2019	(Canada) Lac la Biche	10
10	2022	(Italy) Terni	14
11	2024	(Slovenia) Mokrice	14

== Ski Archery ==
The eighth Ski Archery World Championships held in Moscow in Russia in 2013.

Number	Year	Location	Events
1	1999	(France) -	
2	2000	(Poland) -	
3	2001	(Italy) -	
4	2005		
5	2007		
6	2009		
7	2011		
8	2013	(Russia) Moscow	
9	2015		
10	2017		

== University ==
Number	Year	Location	Events
1	1996	(France) Vaulx-en-Velin	
2	1998	Taoyuan	
3	2000	(Spain) Madrid	
4	2002	(Thailand) Chonburi	
5	2004	(Spain) Madrid	
6	2006	(Slovakia) Viničné	
7	2008	Tainan	
8	2010	(China) Shenzhen	
9	2012	(Spain) Córdoba	
10	2014	(Poland) Legnica	
11	2016	(Mongolia) Ulaanbaatar	

== See also ==
- Asian Archery Championships
- African Archery Championships
- European Archery Championships
- World Outdoor Archery Championships
- World Indoor Archery Championships
- World Field Archery Championships
- World 3D Archery Championships
- World Ski Archery Championships
- World Para Archery Championship
- World Youth Archery Championships
- World University Archery Championships
