= World Field Archery Championships =

International competition in field archery

The World Field Archery Championships is an international competition in field archery. Organised by World Archery, the Championships are held every two years. The host cities most frequently in Europe but occasionally in Australasia or North America.

== Host cities ==
Host cities of the World Field Archery Championships
Host cities of the World Field Archery Championships (Europe - modern borders shown)

== Editions ==
Number	Year	Location	Events
1	1969	(United States) Valley Forge	
2	1970	(United Kingdom) Cardiff	
3	1972	(Italy) Gorizia	
4	1974	(Socialist Federal Republic of Yugoslavia) Zagreb	
5	1976	(Sweden) Mölndal	
6	1978	(Switzerland) Geneva	
7	1980	(New Zealand) Palmerston North	
8	1982	(United Kingdom) Kingsclere	
9	1984	(Finland) Hyvinkää	
10	1986	(Austria) Radstadt	
11	1988	(Italy) Bolzano	
12	1990	(Norway) Loen	
13	1992	(Netherlands) Margraten	
14	1994	(France) Vertus	
15	1996	(Slovenia) Kranjska Gora	
16	1998	(Austria) Obergurgl	
17	2000	(Italy) Cortina	
18	2002	(Australia) Canberra	
19	2004	(Croatia) Plitvice	
20	2006	(Sweden) Gothenburg	
21	2008	(United Kingdom) Llwynypia	
22	2010	(Hungary) Visegrád	
23	2012	(France) Val d'Isère	
24	2014	(Croatia) Zagreb	
25	2016	(Republic of Ireland) Dublin	
26	2018	(Italy) Cortina	
27	2022	(United States) Yankton	
28	2024	(Canada) Lac La Biche	
29	2026	(United States) Yankton	

== Champions ==
=== Men ===
Year	Location	Recurve	Compound	Barebow/Instinctive	Team	Ref
1969	(United States) Valley Forge	Richard Branstetter Jr. (USA)	No event	Warren T. Cowles (USA)	No event	
1970	(United Kingdom) Cardiff	Stephen Lieberman (USA)	No event	Elmer Moore (USA)	No event	
1972	(Italy) Gorizia	John Williams (USA)	No event	Leif Berggren (SWE)	No event	
1974	(Socialist Federal Republic of Yugoslavia) Zagreb	Doug Brothers (USA)	No event	Leif Berggren (SWE)	No event	
1976	(Sweden) Molndal	Tommy Persson (SWE)	No event	Jukka Virtanen (FIN)	No event	
1978	(Switzerland) Geneva	Darrell Pace (USA)	No event	Anders Rosenberg (SWE)	No event	
1980	(New Zealand) Palmerston North	Tommy Persson (SWE)	No event	Anders Rosenberg (SWE)	No event	
1982	(United Kingdom) Kingsclere	Tommy Quick (SWE)	No event	Anders Rosenberg (SWE)	No event	
1984	(Finland) Hyvinkää	Gert Bjerendal (SWE)	No event	Lars Weren (SWE)	No event	
1986	(Austria) Radstadt	Göran Bjerendal (SWE)	No event	Mats Palmer (SWE)	France ^{1}	
1988	(Italy) Bolzano	Andrea Parenti (ITA)	No event	Michele Oneto (ITA)	Italy ^{1}	
1990	(Norway) Loen	Jay Barrs (USA)	Randall Ulmer (USA)	Mats Palmer (SWE)	No event	
1992	(Netherlands) Margraten	Jay Barrs (USA)	Morgan Lundin (SWE)	Anders Rosenberg (SWE)	Australia	
1994	(France) Vertus	Andrea Parenti (ITA)	Tom Henriksen (DEN)	Alessandro Gaudenti (ITA)	France	
1996	(Slovenia) Kranjska Gora	Andrea Parenti (ITA)	Jeff Button (USA)	Renseo van Wees (NED)	France	
1998	(Austria) Obergurgl	Jon Shales (GBR)	Peter Andersson (SWE)	Erik Jonsson (SWE)	United Kingdom	
2000	(Italy) Cortina	Michele Frangilli (ITA)	Morgan Lundin (SWE)	Mathias Larsson (SWE)	Sweden	
2002	(Australia) Canberra	Michele Frangilli (ITA)	Dave Cousins (USA)	Martin Ottoson (SWE)	Sweden	
2004	(Croatia) Plitvice	Sebastian Rohrberg (GER)	Chris White (GBR)	Erik Jonsson (SWE)	Great Britain	
2006	(Sweden) Gothenburg	Michele Frangilli (ITA)	Morgan Lundin (SWE)	Giuseppe Seimandi (ITA)	United States	
2008	(United Kingdom) Llwynypia	Sebastian Rohrberg (GER)	Rod Menzer (USA)	Sergio Massimo Cassiani (ITA)	Italy	
2010	(Hungary) Visegrád	Alan Wills (GBR)	Dave Cousins (USA)	Pasi Ahjokivi (FIN)	Finland	
2012	(France) Val d'Isère	Jean-Charles Valladont (FRA)	Jesse Broadwater (USA)	Sebastián Juanola (ESP)	United States	
2014	(Croatia) Zagreb	Brady Ellison (USA)	Jesse Broadwater (USA)	Erik Jonsson (SWE)	United States	
2016	(Republic of Ireland) Dublin	Brady Ellison (USA)	Steve Anderson (USA)	Erik Jonsson (SWE)	United States	
2018	(Italy) Cortina D'Ampezzo	Wataru Oonuki (JPN)	Mike Schloesser (NED)	Erik Jonsson (SWE)	Germany	
2022	(United States) Yankton	Florian Unruh (GER)	Dave Cousins (USA)	David Jackson (FRA)	Sweden	
2026	(United States) Yankton	Florian Unruh (GER)	Mathias Fullerton (DEN)	Giuseppe Seimandi (ITA)	United States	

Note: ^{1.} Mixed team competition

=== Women ===
Year	Location	Recurve	Compound	Barebow/Instinctive	Team	Ref
1969	(United States) Valley Forge	Irma Danielsson (SWE)	No event	Raye Dabelow (USA)	No event	
1971	(United Kingdom) Cardiff	Sonia Johansson (SWE)	No event	Eunice Schewe (USA)	No event	
1972	(Italy) Gorizia	Maureen Bechdolt (USA)	No event	Ingegerd Grandqvist (SWE)	No event	
1974	(Socialist Federal Republic of Yugoslavia) Zagreb	Lucille Lessard (CAN)	No event	Eunice Schewe (USA)	No event	
1976	(Sweden) Molndal	Annemarie Lehmann (GER)	No event	Shirley Sandiford (GBR)	No event	
1978	(Switzerland) Geneva	Annemarie Lehmann (GER)	No event	Suizuko Kobuchi (JPN)	No event	
1980	(New Zealand) Palmerston North	Carita Jussila (FIN)	No event	Sirpa Konttila (FIN)	No event	
1982	(United Kingdom) Kingsclere	Carita Jussila (FIN)	No event	Annie Dardenne (FRA)	No event	
1984	(Finland) Hyvinkää	Lisa Buscombe (CAN)	No event	Giuseppina Meini (ITA)	No event	
1986	(Austria) Radstadt	Carita Jussila (FIN)	No event	Annie Dardenne (FRA)	France ^{1}	
1988	(Italy) Bolzano	Liselott Andersson (SWE)	No event	Giuseppina Meini (ITA)	Italy ^{1}	
1990	(Norway) Loen	Carole Ferriou (FRA)	Ann Shepherd (GBR)	Nadine Visconti (FRA)	No event	
1992	(Netherlands) Margraten	Carole Ferriou (FRA)	Susanne Kessler (DEN)	Nadine Visconti (FRA)	Italy	
1994	(France) Vertus	Jenny Sjouall (SWE)	Michelle Ragsdale (AUS)	Odile Boussiere (FRA)	Germany	
1996	(Slovenia) Kranjska Gora	Carole Ferriou (FRA)	Petra Ericsson (SWE)	Odile Boussiere (FRA)	Sweden	
1998	(Austria) Obergurgl	Sabine Mayrhofer (AUT)	Catherine Pellen (FRA)	Trish Lovell (GBR)	France	
2000	(Italy) Cortina	Christel van Berkel (NED)	Jahna Davis (USA)	Trish Lovell (GBR)	Italy	
2002	(Australia) Canberra	Laure Barczynski (FRA)	Catherine Pellen (FRA)	Reingild Linhart (AUT)	Sweden	
2004	(Croatia) Plitvice	Jessica Tomasi (ITA)	Francoise Volle (FRA)	Monika Jentges (GER)	France	
2006	(Sweden) Gothenburg	Dolores Cekada (SLO)	Silke Hoettecke (GER)	Luciana Pennacchi (ITA)	Sweden	
2008	(United Kingdom) Llwynypia	Jessica Tomasi (ITA)	Jamie van Natta (USA)	Becky Nelson-Harris (USA)	Sweden	
2010	(Hungary) Visegrád	Christine Bjerendal (SWE)	Anne Lantee (FIN)	Eleanora Strobbe (ITA)	Germany	
2012	(France) Val d'Isère	Elena Richter (GER)	Ivana Buden (CRO)	Lina Bjorklund (SWE)	Great Britain	
2014	(Croatia) Zagreb	Lisa Unruh (GER)	Toja Cerne (SLO)	Lina Bjorklund (SWE)	Austria	
2016	(Republic of Ireland) Dublin	Amy Oliver (GBR)	Irene Franchini (ITA)	Chantal Porte (FRA)	Great Britain	
2018	(Italy) Cortina D'Ampezzo	Lisa Unruh (GER)	Paige Pearce (USA)	Lina Björklund (SWE)	Germany	
2022	(United States) Yankton	Chiara Rebagliati (ITA)	Paige Pearce (USA)	Cinzia Noziglia (ITA)	Italy	
2026	(United States) Yankton	Casey Kaufhold (USA)	Ella Gibson (GBR)	Eleonora Strobbe (ITA)	United States	

Note: ^{1.} Mixed team competition

=== Junior Men ===
Year	Location	Recurve/Freestyle	Compound	Barebow/Instinctive	Team	Ref
1986	(Austria) Radstadt	Simon Pavlin (YUG)	No Event	Izidor Pozar (YUG)	No Event	
1988	(Italy) Bolzano	Andreas Lorenz (ITA)	No Event	Thomas Mulleman (DEN)	No Event	
2000	(Italy) Cortina	Daniela Ascenzi (ITA) ^{1}	Giocomo Biaggini (ITA) ^{1}	Luca Del Secco (ITA)^{1}	No Event	
2002	(Australia) Canberra					
2004	(Croatia) Plitvice	Ivan Muznik (SLO)	Stefano Zanobetti (ITA)	Andreas Lindstrom (SWE)	Slovenia	
2006	(Sweden) Gothenburg	Lars Eggestig (SWE)	Mikkel Norgaard (DEN)	Mattia Careggio (ITA)	Italy	
2008	(Wales) Llwynypia	Massimiliano Mandia (ITA)	Alex Bridgman (GBR)	No Event	No Event	
2010	(Hungary) Visegrád	Jarrod Nicholson (AUS)	Sean Elza (USA)	Raphael Petit Minuesa (FRA)	Germany	
2012	(France) Val d'Isère	Jesper Fredriksson (SWE)	Renaud Domanski (BEL)	No Event	Germany	
2014	(Croatia) Zagreb	Matija Mihalic (CRO)	Mario Vavro (CRO)	Alessio Noceti (ITA)	Great Britain	
2016	(Republic of Ireland) Dublin	Alen Remar (CRO)	Nico Wiener (AUT)	Alessio Noceti (ITA)	United States	

Note: ^{1.} Unofficial

=== Junior Women ===
Year	Location	Recurve/freestyle	Compound	Barebow/Instinctive	Team	Ref
1988	(Italy) Bolzano	Carole Ferriou (FRA)	No Event	No Event	No Event	
2000	(Italy) Cortina	No Event	Francesco Fabruzzo (ITA) ^{1}	Aden Mulligan (GBR)^{1}	No Event	
2002	(Australia) Canberra				No Event	
2004	(Croatia) Plitvice	Maja Žlender (SLO) ^{1}	Isabell Danielsson (SWE) ^{1}	Irene Mausoli (ITA)^{1}	No Event	
2006	(Sweden) Gothenburg	Malin Wallin (SWE) ^{1}	Malin Johansson (SWE)	Petra Krt (SLO)	No Event	
2008	(United Kingdom) Llwynypia	Ana Umer (SLO)	No Event	No Event	No Event	
2010	(Hungary) Visegrád	Zoe Gobbels (BEL)	Emeline Salmon (FRA)	No Event	No Event	
2012	(France) Val d'Isère	Marion Vives (FRA)	Sabrina Franzoi (ITA)	No Event	Great Britain	
2014	(Croatia) Zagreb	Miriam Trafford (USA)	Maja Orlic (CRO)	Anna Carrasco (ITA)	No Event	
2016	(Republic of Ireland) Dublin	Chiara Rebagliati (ITA)	Sophia Strachan (USA)	Sara Noceti (ITA)	(Italy) Italia	

Note: ^{1.} Unofficial

== Medal table ==
Updated result after 1969–2026 edition.

Rank	Nation	Gold	Silver	Bronze	Total
1	Italy	61	51	42	154
2	United States	54	50	36	140
3	Sweden	53	44	35	132
4	France	27	22	26	75
5	Great Britain	19	27	25	71
6	Germany	15	19	28	62
7	Slovenia	9	7	17	33
8	Finland	8	10	13	31
9	Romania	6	2	2	10
10	Croatia	5	5	4	14
11	Denmark	5	4	4	13
12	Australia	4	8	13	25
13	Austria	4	6	5	15
13	Netherlands	4	6	5	15
15	Spain	3	3	2	8
16	Canada	3	2	4	9
17	West Germany	2	4	2	8
18	Belgium	2	3	3	8
19	Japan	2	1	3	6
20	Yugoslavia	2	0	0	2
21	Czech Republic	1	3	1	5
22	Luxembourg	1	0	0	1
23	Norway	0	2	4	6
24	China	0	2	0	2
25	Argentina	0	1	1	2
25	Hungary	0	1	1	2
25	Switzerland	0	1	1	2
28	Mexico	0	1	0	1
28	Slovakia	0	1	0	1
30	Israel	0	0	1	1
30	New Zealand	0	0	1	1
30	Poland	0	0	1	1
Totals (32 entries)		290	286	280	856
