= 2002 World Field Archery Championships =

- Location: Canberra, Australia
- Start date: 10 Sep
- End date: 14 Sep

The 2002 World Field Archery Championships was the 18th edition of the World Field Archery Championships and were held in Canberra, Australia.

== Medal summary (Men's individual) ==
Event	Gold	Silver	Bronze
Compound Men's individual	(United States) Dave Cousins	(United Kingdom) Chris White	(France) Stephane Dardenne
Recurve Men's individual	(Italy) Michele Frangilli	(Germany) Sebastian Rohrberg	(United Kingdom) Alan Wills
Barebow Men's individual	(Sweden) Martin Ottosson	(Netherlands) Twan Cleven	(Italy) Danielle Bellotti

== Medal summary (Women's individual) ==
Event	Gold	Silver	Bronze
Compound Women's individual	(France) Catherine Pellen	(Sweden) Karin Teghammar	(Finland) Anne Laurila
Recurve Women's individual	(France) Laure Barcynski	(Italy) Cristina Ioratti	(Italy) Irene Franchini
Barebow Women's individual	(Austria) Reingild Linhart	(Germany) Monika Jentges	(United Kingdom) Trish Lovell

== Medal summary (Men's Team) ==
Event	Gold	Silver	Bronze
Team Event	Sweden (SWE); Göran Bjerendal; Morgan Lundin; Mathias Larsson	Germany (GER); Ladislav Voboril; Peter Penner; Sebastian Rohrberg	Italy (ITA); Danielle Bellotti; Mario Ruele; Michele Frangilli

== Medal summary (Women's Team) ==
Event	Gold	Silver	Bronze
Team Event	Sweden (SWE); Charlotte Lofastedt; Petra Eriksson; Ulrika Sjöwall	Austria (AUT); Reingild Linhart; Petra Friedl; Elisabeth Grube	Australia (AUS); Marianne Gale; Madeleine Ferris; Deonne Bridger
