= 2008 World Field Archery Championships =

Archery competition

- Location: Llwynypia & Cardiff, Wales
- Start date: 01 September
- End date: 06 September

The 2008 World Field Archery Championships was the 21st edition of the World Field Archery Championships and were held in Llwynypia & Cardiff, Wales. The qualifying took place in the village of Llwynypia and the final field was situated at the St Fagans National History Museum in Cardiff.

== Medal summary (Men's individual) ==
Event	Gold	Silver	Bronze
Compound Men's individual	(United States) Rod Menzer	(France) Stephane Dardenne	(United States) Dave Cousins
Recurve Men's individual	(Germany) Sebastian Rohrberg	(Germany) Andreas Heuwing	(Japan) Yuki Sakaeyama
Barebow Men's individual	(Italy) Sergio Massimo Cassiani	(Germany) Ladislav Voboril	(Sweden) Mathias Larsson

== Medal summary (Women's individual) ==
Event	Gold	Silver	Bronze
Compound Women's individual	(United States) Jamie Van Natta	(Sweden) Ulrika Sjöwall	(Finland) Anne Laurila
Recurve Women's individual	(Italy) Jessica Tomasi	(Sweden) Elin Kattstrom	(Germany) Lisa Unruh
Barebow Women's individual	(United States) Becky Nelson-Harris	(Sweden) Annika Åhlund	(Germany) Manja Conrad

== Medal summary (Men's Team) ==
Event	Gold	Silver	Bronze
Team Event	Italy (ITA); Michele Frangilli; Alessandro Lodetti; Giuseppe Seimandi	Sweden (SWE); Göran Bjerendal; Mathias Larsson; Morgan Lundin	Germany (GER); Sebastian Rohrberg; Josef Meyer; Jens Asbach

== Medal summary (Women's Team) ==
Event	Gold	Silver	Bronze
Team Event	Sweden (SWE); Elin Kattstrom; Ulrika Sjöwall; Annika Åhlund	Italy (ITA); Anastasia Anastasio; Eleonora Strobbe; Jessica Tomasi	Germany (GER); Lisa Unruh; Silke Hoettecke; Monika Jentges

== Medal summary (Men's Juniors) ==
Event	Gold	Silver	Bronze
Compound Men's individual	(United Kingdom) Alex Bridgman	(Denmark) Thor Finderup Sorensen	(Germany) Florian Oswald
Recurve Men's individual	(Italy) Massimilliano Mandia	(China) Youjia Yuan	(United Kingdom) Christopher Wells

== Medal summary (Women's Juniors) ==
Event	Gold	Silver	Bronze
Recurve Women's individual	(Slovenia) Ana Umer	(China) Hui Jiang	(Italy) Stefania Rolle
