= 2003 World Archery Championships – Men's team compound =

The men's team compound competition at the 2003 World Archery Championships took place in July 2003 in New York City, United States. 107 archers took part in the men's compound qualification round with no more than 4 from each country, and the 16 teams of 3 archers with the highest cumulative totals (out of a possible 26) qualified for the 4-round knockout round, drawn according to their qualification round scores.

== Seeds ==
Seedings were based on the combined total of the team members' qualification scores in the individual ranking rounds. The top 16 teams were assigned places in the draw depending on their overall ranking.

1. (United States) Dave Cousins / Braden Gellenthien / Dee Wilde (champions)
2. (France) Jean-Marc Beaud / Stephane Sauvignon / Dominique Genet (quarterfinal)
3. (Italy) Fabio Girardi / Antonio Tosco / Mario Ruele (2nd place)
4. (Denmark) Tom Henriksen / Erik P. Nielsen / Martin Damsbo (quarterfinal)
5. (Netherlands) Peter Elzinga / Fred van Zutphen / Johan van Dongen (4th place)
6. (Australia) Clint Freeman / Dennis Carson / Douglas Currall (1st round)
7. (United Kingdom) Chris White / Simon Tarplee / Alan Hayden (1st round)
8. (Spain) Arturo Torrijos / Jose Ignacio Catalan / Antonio Gonzalez (1st round)
9. (Sweden) Morgan Lundin / Anders Malm / Magnus Carlsson (quarterfinal)
10. (Canada) Kevin Tataryn / Ed Wilson / Travis Vandaele (3rd place)
11. (Germany) Stefan Griem / Robert Hesse / Markus Gross (quarterfinal)
12. (Slovenia) Dejan Sitar / Stefan Osep / Dusan Perhac (1st round)
13. (El Salvador) Jorge Jiménez / Renato Lara / Rigoberto Hernandez (1st round)
14. (Switzerland) Patrizio Hofer / Juan Galera / Christophe Winter (1st round)
15. (Belgium) Philippe Prieels / Ernest Mertens / Marc Braeckman (1st round)
16. (Norway) Terje Roestad / Morten Bøe / Vegard Myrvang (1st round)

== Draw ==
1st round
1	United States	262
16	Norway	253
9	Sweden	255*
8	Spain	255
5	Netherlands	257
12	Slovenia	255
13	El Salvador	255
4	Denmark	260
3	Italy	257
14	Switzerland	249
11	Germany	252
6	Australia	251
7	United Kingdom	257
10	Canada	259
15	Belgium	246
2	France	258

Quarterfinals
1	United States	260
9	Sweden	251
5	Netherlands	258
4	Denmark	256
3	Italy	257
11	Germany	246
10	Canada	254
2	France	251

Semifinals
1	United States	259
5	Netherlands	255
3	Italy	258
10	Canada	256

Finals
1	United States	263
3	Italy	256
Third place
5	Netherlands	246
10	Canada	255
