= 2000 World Field Archery Championships =

- Location: Cortina d'Ampezzo, Italy

The 2000 World Field Archery Championships was the 17th edition of the World Field Archery Championships and were held in Cortina d'Ampezzo, Italy.

== Medal summary (Men's individual) ==
| Event | Gold | Silver | Bronze |
|---|---|---|---|
| Compound Men's individual | (Sweden) Morgan Lundin | (United States) Dave Cousins | (Germany) Peter Penner |
| Recurve Men's individual | (Italy) Michele Frangilli | (Sweden) Göran Bjerendal | (United Kingdom) Jon Shales |
| Barebow Men's individual | (Sweden) Mathias Larsson | (Slovenia) Marjan Podrzaj | (Sweden) Erik Jonsson |

== Medal summary (Women's individual) ==
| Event | Gold | Silver | Bronze |
|---|---|---|---|
| Compound Women's individual | (United States) Jahna Davis | (Italy) Rosanna Spada | (Germany) Monika Blume Thasler |
| Recurve Women's individual | (Netherlands) Christel van Berkel | (Germany) Manuela Kaltenmark | (Italy) Cristina Ioratti |
| Barebow Women's individual | (United Kingdom) Trish Lovell | (France) Odile Boussière | (Finland) Anne Vikjanen |

== Medal summary (Men's Team) ==
| Event | Gold | Silver | Bronze |
|---|---|---|---|
| Team Event | Sweden (SWE); Göran Bjerendal; Morgan Lundin; Mathias Larsson | Netherlands (NED); Twan Cleven; Ron van der Hoff; Guido van den Bosch | France (FRA); Nicolas Gaudron; Christophe Clement; Hervé Dardant |

== Medal summary (Women's Team) ==
| Event | Gold | Silver | Bronze |
|---|---|---|---|
| Team Event | Italy (ITA); Lorena Moretti; Cristina Ioratti; Francesca Peracino | Sweden (SWE); Lisa Andersson; Kerstin Beijer; Ulrika Sjöwall | France (FRA); Catherine Pellen; Odile Boussière; Carole Ferriou |

== Medal summary (Juniors) ==
| Event | Gold | Silver | Bronze |
|---|---|---|---|
| Compound Men's individual | (Italy) Giacomo Biaggini | (United Kingdom) Lawrence Lovell | |
| Recurve Men's individual | (Italy) Daniele Ascenzi | (Netherlands) Dave Van De Coelen | (Netherlands) Jan Verhoeven |
| Barebow Men's individual | (Italy) Luca Del Secco | | |
| Compound Women's individual | (Italy) Francesca Fabruzzo | | |
| Barebow Women's individual | (United Kingdom) Aden Mulligan | (Italy) Darinka De Lucia | |
