= Field archery at the 2005 World Games – Men's compound =

Field archery men's compound at the 2005 World Games
- Venue: Mülheimer Wald und MüGa-Gelände, Duisburg, Germany
- Dates: 15–17 July 2005
- Competitors: 28 from 17 nations

Medalists
gold medal	(Sweden) Morgan Lundin
silver medal	(Slovenia) Dejan Sitar
bronze medal	(United States) Dave Cousins

The men's compound archery competition at the 2005 World Games took place from 15 to 17 August 2005 at the Mülheimer Wald und MüGa-Gelände in Duisburg, Germany.

== Competition format ==
A total of 28 archers entered the competition. The best four athletes from preliminary round qualifies to the semifinals.

== Results ==
=== Preliminary round ===
Rank	Archer	Nation	Score	Note
1	Dave Cousins	United States	720	Q
2	Chris White	(United Kingdom) Great Britain	717	Q
3	Dejan Sitar	Slovenia	716	Q
4	Morgan Lundin	Sweden	716	Q
5	Niels Baldur	Denmark	714	
6	Clint Freeman	Australia	714	
7	John Dudley	United States	713	
8	Uroš Krička	Slovenia	713	
9	Franck Karsenty	Israel	712	
10	Tom Henriksen	Denmark	710	
11	József Berényi	Hungary	709	
12	Florian Faucheur	France	708	
13	Axel Langweige	Germany	707	
14	Jari Haavisto	Finland	707	
15	Antonio Pompeo	Italy	707	
16	Alessandro Lodetti	Italy	706	
17	Stephen Gooden	(United Kingdom) Great Britain	705	
18	Ruben Ochoa	Mexico	705	
19	Mats-Inge Smørdal	Norway	705	
20	Stéphane Dardenne	France	705	
21	Hans-Jörg Kain	Austria	704	
22	Roland Pepperl	Germany	702	
23	Juho Poikulainen	Finland	699	
24	Jordi Sabata	Spain	697	
25	James Park	Australia	694	
26	Armando de la Garza	Mexico	691	
27	Gábor Gergely	Hungary	678	
28	Tomáš Procházka	Czech Republic	678	

=== Finals ===
Semifinals
1	(United States) Dave Cousins	59
4	(Sweden) Morgan Lundin	59*
2	(United Kingdom) Chris White	59
3	(Slovenia) Dejan Sitar	60

Finals
4	(Sweden) Morgan Lundin	59(5)
3	(Slovenia) Dejan Sitar	59(4)
Third place
1	(United States) Dave Cousins	60(5,5,5)
2	(United Kingdom) Chris White	60(5,5,4)
