= 2003 World Archery Championships – Men's individual compound =

The men's individual compound competition at the 2003 World Archery Championships took place in July 2003 in New York City, United States. 107 archers entered the competition. Following a qualifying 144 arrow FITA round, the top 64 archers qualified for the 6-round knockout tournament, drawn according to their qualification round scores. The semi-finals and finals then took place on 20 July.

== Qualifying ==
The following archers were the leading 8 qualifiers:

1. (United States) Dave Cousins (2nd place)
2. (Australia) Clint Freeman (Champion)
3. (United States) Braden Gellenthien (3rd place)
4. (United Kingdom) Chris White (Quarterfinal)
5. (France) Jean-Marc Beaud (1st round)
6. (United States) Dee Wilde (2nd round)
7. (Slovenia) Dejan Sitar (Quarterfinal)
8. (El Salvador) Jorge Jiménez (3rd round)

== Finals ==
Quarterfinals
1	(United States) Dave Cousins	114
56	(Norway) Morten Bøe	112
21	(Finland) Jari Haavisto	116
4	(United Kingdom) Chris White	114
3	(United States) Braden Gellenthien	115*
43	(France) Denis Vanez	115
7	(Slovenia) Dejan Sitar	111
2	(Australia) Clint Freeman	112

Semifinals
1	(United States) Dave Cousins	116
21	(Finland) Jari Haavisto	112
3	(United States) Braden Gellenthien	112
2	(Australia) Clint Freeman	113

Finals
1	(United States) Dave Cousins	114
2	(Australia) Clint Freeman	114*
Third place
21	(Finland) Jari Haavisto	114
3	(United States) Braden Gellenthien	115
