= Field archery at the 2001 World Games – Men's compound =

Archery competition

Field archery men's compound at the 2001 World Games
- Venue: Opas Skiing Spot, Akita, Japan
- Dates: 17–19 August 2001
- Competitors: 23 from 14 nations

Medalists
| gold medal | (United States) Dave Cousins |
| silver medal | (Sweden) Björn Andersson |
| bronze medal | (France) Hervé Dardant |

The men's compound archery competition at the 2001 World Games took place from 17 to 19 August 2001 at the Opas Skiing Spot in Akita, Japan.

== Competition format ==
A total of 23 archers entered the competition. The best four athletes from preliminary round qualifies to the semifinals.

== Results ==
=== Preliminary round ===
| Rank | Archer | Nation | Score | Note |
|---|---|---|---|---|
| 1 | Dave Cousins | United States | 712 | Q |
| 2 | Björn Andersson | Sweden | 711 | Q |
| 3 | Hervé Dardant | France | 708 | Q |
| 4 | Akira Yamada | Japan | 708 | Q |
| 5 | Thierry Barbier | France | 707 | |
| 6 | Tibor Ondrik | Hungary | 704 | |
| 7 | Clint Freeman | Australia | 704 | |
| 8 | Carlo Barera | Italy | 704 | |
| 9 | Morgan Lundin | Sweden | 703 | |
| 10 | Jeffrey Button | United States | 702 | |
| 11 | Chris White | (United Kingdom) Great Britain | 701 | |
| 12 | Morten Bøe | Norway | 700 | |
| 13 | Vegard Myrvang | Norway | 699 | |
| 14 | Guido van den Bosch | Netherlands | 698 | |
| 15 | Michele Silla | Italy | 697 | |
| 16 | Hans-Jorg Kain | Austria | 696 | |
| 17 | Alojzij Mrak | Slovenia | 694 | |
| 18 | Trevor Morgan | (United Kingdom) Great Britain | 686 | |
| 19 | Adam Richards | Australia | 680 | |
| 20 | Hiroshi Shimizu | Japan | 676 | |
| 21 | Kenneth Rogers | New Zealand | 669 | |
| 22 | Robert Prudente | Switzerland | 643 | |
| | Florjan Florijančič | Slovenia | DNS | |

=== Finals ===
Semifinals
1 | (United States) Dave Cousins | 60
4 | (Japan) Akira Yamada | 57
2 | (Sweden) Björn Andersson | 60
3 | (France) Hervé Dardant | 58

Finals
1 | (United States) Dave Cousins | 58
2 | (Sweden) Björn Andersson | 56
Third place
4 | (Japan) Akira Yamada | 56
3 | (France) Hervé Dardant | 58
