= 2004 World Field Archery Championships =

- Location: Plitvice Lakes National Park, Croatia
- Start date: 05 July
- End date: 10 July

The 2004 World Field Archery Championships was the 19th edition of the World Field Archery Championships and were held in Plitvice Lakes National Park, Croatia.

== Medal summary (Men's individual) ==
Event	Gold	Silver	Bronze
Compound Men's individual	(United Kingdom) Chris White	(United States) John Dudley	(Sweden) Morgan Lundin
Recurve Men's individual	(Germany) Sebastian Rohrberg	(United States) Joseph McGlyn	(Belgium) Jean-Michel Piquet
Barebow Men's individual	(Sweden) Erik Jonsson	(Italy) Mario Orlandi	(Sweden) Mathias Larsson

== Medal summary (Women's individual) ==
Event	Gold	Silver	Bronze
Compound Women's individual	(France) Francoise Volle	(Austria) Petra Friedl	(Germany) Martina Schacht
Recurve Women's individual	(Italy) Jessica Tomasi	(Italy) Elisabetta Buono	(Germany) Manuela Kaltenmark
Barebow Women's individual	(Germany) Monika Jentges	(Austria) Reingild Linhart	(United Kingdom) Marian Howells

== Medal summary (Men's Team) ==
Event	Gold	Silver	Bronze
Team Event	Great Britain (GBR); Alan Wills; Chris White; Peter Mulligan	France (FRA); Antoine Friot; Stephane Dardenne; Christophe Clement	Sweden (SWE); Bjorn Jansson; Morgan Lundin; Erik Jonsson

== Medal summary (Women's Team) ==
Event	Gold	Silver	Bronze
Team Event	France (FRA); Laure Barczynski; Francoise Volle; Christine Gauthe	Germany (GER); Hedi Mittermaier; Martina Schacht; Monika Jentges	Slovenia (SVN); Dolores Čekada; Maja Marcen; Staša Podgoršek

== Medal summary (Men's Juniors) ==
Event	Gold	Silver	Bronze
Compound Men's individual	(Italy) Stefano Zanobetti	(Sweden) Mikael Roos	(Hungary) Milan Kiss
Recurve Men's individual	(Slovenia) Ivan Muznik	(Slovenia) Rok Mažgon	(Italy) Alessandro Anderle
Barebow Men's individual	(Sweden) Andreas Lindstrom	(United Kingdom) Gavin Howells	(Slovenia) Andrej Natlačen

== Medal summary (Women's Juniors) ==
Event	Gold	Silver	Bronze
Compound Women's individual	(Sweden) Isabell Danielsson	(Sweden) Sara Boberg	(Italy) Claudia Benigni
Recurve Women's individual	(Slovenia) Maja Žlender	(Italy) Carla Frangilli	(Italy) Arianna Zenoniani
Barebow Women's individual	(Italy) Irene Mausoli	Not awarded	

== Medal summary (Junior Men's Team) ==
Event	Gold	Silver	Bronze
Team Event	Slovenia (SVN); Ivan Muznik; Andraž Kuret; Andrej Natlačen	Croatia (CRO); Josip Jakopović; Domagoj Bodlaj; Martin Banić	Italy (ITA); Alessandro Anderle; Stefano Zanobetti; Giuseppe Seimandi
