= 1986 World Field Archery Championships =

Archery event in Radstadt, Austria

- Location: Radstadt, Austria

The 1986 World Field Archery Championships was the 10th edition of the World Field Archery Championships and were held in Radstadt, Austria.

== Medal summary (Men's individual) ==
Event	Gold	Silver	Bronze
Barebow Men's individual	(Sweden) Mats Palmer	(Sweden) Anders Rosenberg	(Austria) Wolfgang Sedmark
Freestyle Men's individual	(Sweden) Göran Bjerendal	(Sweden) Gjert Bjerendal	(Austria) Herbert Reingruber

== Medal summary (Women's individual) ==
Event	Gold	Silver	Bronze
Barebow Women's individual	(France) Annie Dardenne	(West Germany) Erika Mok	(Italy) Guissepina Meini
Freestyle Women's individual	(Finland) Carita Jussila	(Canada) Lisa Buscombe	(France) Catherine Pellen

== Medal summary (Mixed team) ==
Event	Gold	Silver	Bronze
Team Event	France (FRA); Annie Dardenne; Stephane Legrand; Pascal Colmaire; Catherine Pellen	Sweden (SWE); Mats Palmer; Anita Carlsson; Göran Bjerendal; Ylva Ivarsson	West Germany (FRG); Ladislav Voboril; Peter Hansel; Miloslava Zahradnicek; Erika Mok

== Medal summary (Junior Men's individual) ==
Event	Gold	Silver	Bronze
Barebow Men's individual	(Socialist Federal Republic of Yugoslavia) Izidor Pozar	(Finland) Olli Sarv	(Sweden) Fredrik Hallquist
Freestyle Men's individual	(Socialist Federal Republic of Yugoslavia) Simon Pavlin	(West Germany) Thorsten Sauter	(Italy) Damiano Scaramuzza
