= 1998 World Field Archery Championships =

- Location: Obergurgl, Austria

The 1998 World Field Archery Championships was the 16th edition of the World Field Archery Championships and were held in Obergurgl, Austria.

== Medal summary (Men's individual) ==
Event	Gold	Silver	Bronze
Compound Men's individual	(Sweden) Peter Andersson	(United States) Dave Cousins	(Denmark) Niels Badur
Recurve Men's individual	(United Kingdom) Jon Shales	(Italy) Michele Frangilli	(Netherlands) Geert Van Berkel
Barebow Men's individual	(Sweden) Erik Jonsson	(Sweden) Matthias Larsson	(Slovenia) Marjan Podrzaj

== Medal summary (Women's individual) ==
Event	Gold	Silver	Bronze
Compound Women's individual	(France) Catherine Pellen	(United States) Michelle Ragsdale	(United States) Becky Pearson
Recurve Women's individual	(Austria) Sabine Mayrhofer	(Italy) Irene Franchini	(France) Carole Ferriou
Barebow Women's individual	(United Kingdom) Trish Lovell	(France) Odile Boussière	(Germany) Jutta Schneider

== Medal summary (Men's Team) ==
Event	Gold	Silver	Bronze
Team Event	France (FRA); Jean-Paul Laury; Karl Blondeau; Christophe Clement	Great Britain (GBR); Gary Kinghom; Jon Shales; Peter Mulligan	Sweden (SWE); Göran Bjerendal; Morgan Lundin; Matthias Larsson

== Medal summary (Women's Team) ==
Event	Gold	Silver	Bronze
Team Event	France (FRA); Catherine Pellen; Odile Boussière; Carole Ferriou	Italy (ITA); Fabiola Palazzini; Cristina Ioratti; Anna Maria Bianchi	Germany (GER); Hedi Mittermaier; Ellen Spranger; Jutta Schneider
