= 1988 World Field Archery Championships =

International archery competition

- Location: Bolzano, Italy

The 1988 World Field Archery Championships was the 11th edition of the World Field Archery Championships and were held in Bolzano, Italy.

== Medal summary (Men's individual) ==
Event	Gold	Silver	Bronze
Barebow Men's individual	(Italy) Michele Oneto	(Finland) Jarmo Hilli	(Austria) Wolfgang Sedmak
Freestyle Men's individual	(Italy) Andrea Parenti	(Denmark) Ole Gammelgaard	(United States) Jay Barrs

== Medal summary (Women's individual) ==
Event	Gold	Silver	Bronze
Barebow Women's individual	(Italy) Guissepina Meini	(West Germany) Erika Mok	(France) Nadine Visconti
Freestyle Women's individual	(Sweden) Liselott Andersson	(France) Catherine Pellen	(Finland) Carita Jussila

== Medal summary (Mixed team) ==
Event	Gold	Silver	Bronze
Team Event	Italy (ITA); Giuseppina Meini; Michele Oneto; Mariangela Buffa; Andrea Parenti	Sweden (SWE); Mats Palmer; Jessica Nyberg; Lennart Heed; Liselott Andersson	France (FRA); Nadine Visconti; Stephane Legrand; Catherine Pellen; Gilles Neron

== Medal summary (Junior's individual) ==
Event	Gold	Silver	Bronze
Barebow Men's individual	(Denmark) Thomas Mulleman	(Sweden) Peter Rasmusson	(Italy) Gabriele Seghetta
Freestyle Men's individual	(Italy) Andreas Lorenz	(France) Martial Simon	(Australia) Matthew Gray
Freestyle Women's individual	(France) Carole Ferriou	(Italy) Barbara Gheza	(Australia) Deonne Bridger
