= 1992 World Field Archery Championships =

- Location: Margraten, Netherlands

The 1992 World Field Archery Championships was the 13th edition of the World Field Archery Championships and were held in Margraten, Netherlands.

== Medal summary (Men's individual) ==
Event	Gold	Silver	Bronze
Barebow Men's individual	(Sweden) Anders Rosenberg	(Sweden) Mats Palmer	(France) Jean-François Maranzana
Freestyle Men's individual	(United States) Jay Barrs	(France) Jean-Paul Laury	(Sweden) Göran Bjerendal
Compound Men's individual	(Sweden) Morgan Lundin	(Denmark) Niels Baldur	(Denmark) Paw Lassen

== Medal summary (Women's individual) ==
Event	Gold	Silver	Bronze
Barebow Women's individual	(France) Nadine Visconti	(United Kingdom) Trish Lovell	(Italy) Christina Turolla
Freestyle Women's individual	(France) Carole Ferriou	(France) Catherine Pellen	(United States) Judi Adams
Compound Women's individual	(Denmark) Susanne Kessler	(Switzerland) Cecile Loutan	(France) Valérie Fabre

== Medal summary (Men's Team) ==
Event	Gold	Silver	Bronze
Team Event	Australia (AUS); Tony Pitt-Lancaster; Matthew Gray; Clint Freeman	France (FRA); Jean-François Maranzana; Jean-Paul Laury; Dominique Guyon	Great Britain (GBR); Roy Mundon; Allan Scovell; Ben Jones

== Medal summary (Women's Team) ==
Event	Gold	Silver	Bronze
Team Event	Italy (ITA); Christina Turolla; Carmen Ceriotti; Lara Maccarinelli	Sweden (SWE); Asa Johsson; Jenny Sjowall; Ylva Haglund	France (FRA); Nadine Visconti; Carole Ferriou; Valérie Fabre
