= Ursula Valenta =

Austrian archer (born 1951)

Ursula Valenta (born 17 July 1951) is an Austrian archer.

== Archery ==
Valenta competed at the 1978 and 1982 World Field Archery Championships winning a silver and bronze medal respectively in the freestyle women's individual event.

She took part in three World Archery Championships with a highest finish of eighteenth.

At the 1984 Summer Olympic Games she came 32nd with 2395 points scored in the women's individual event.
