= Field archery at the 2009 World Games =

- Venue: Chengcing Lake
- Dates: 24–26 July 2009
- Competitors: 96 from 20 nations

The field archery tournaments at the 2009 World Games in Kaohsiung was played between 24 and 26 July. 96 archers, from 20 nations, participated in the tournament. The archery competition took place at the Chengcing Lake.

== Participating nations ==
- Australia (2)
- Austria (2)
- Belgium (3)
- Chinese Taipei (6)
- Croatia (1)
- Finland (5)
- France (7)
- Germany (12)
- Great Britain (10)
- Hungary (3)
- Israel (1)
- Italy (13)
- Japan (1)
- Netherlands (3)
- Norway (1)
- Slovenia (7)
- Spain (1)
- Sweden (9)
- Switzerland (1)
- United States (8)

== Medal table ==
Rank	Nation	Gold	Silver	Bronze	Total
1	Italy	2	3	1	6
2	United States	2	0	0	2
3	France	1	1	0	2
4	Austria	1	0	0	1
5	Finland	0	1	0	1
5	Netherlands	0	1	0	1
7	Germany	0	0	2	2
7	Great Britain	0	0	2	2
9	Croatia	0	0	1	1
Totals (9 entries)		6	6	6	18

== Events ==
=== Men's events ===
Event	Gold	Silver	Bronze
Recurve	Vic Wunderle; United States	Michele Frangilli; Italy	Sebastian Rohrberg; Germany
Compound	Kevin Wilkey; United States	Alessandro Lodetti; Italy	Chris White; Great Britain
Barebow	Giuseppe Seimandi; Italy	Pasi Ahjokivi; Finland	Sergio Cassiani; Italy

=== Women's events ===
Event	Gold	Silver	Bronze
Recurve	Carole Ferriou; France	Jessica Tomasi; Italy	Naomi Folkard; Great Britain
Compound	Petra Göbel; Austria	Ingeborg Enthoven; Netherlands	Ivana Buden; Croatia
Barebow	Eleonora Strobbe; Italy	Christine Gauthé; France	Monika Jentges; Germany
