= 2014 World Field Archery Championships =

International archery competition

- Location: Zagreb, Croatia
- Start date: 18 August
- End date: 24 August

The 2014 World Field Archery Championships was the 24th edition of the World Field Archery Championships and were held in Maksimir Park, Zagreb, Croatia.

== Medal summary ==
=== Elite events ===
Event	Gold	Silver	Bronze
Men's Events
Compound Men's individual	(United States) Jesse Broadwater	(United Kingdom) Christopher White	(Slovenia) Slavko Tursic
Recurve Men's individual	(United States) Brady Ellison	(France) Jean-Charles Valladont	(France) Jerome Bidault
Barebow Men's individual	(Sweden) Erik Jonsson	(Sweden) Martin Ottosson	(Australia) Michael Fisher
Men's team	United States (USA); Ben Rogers; Brady Ellison; Jesse Broadwater	France (FRA); Benjamin Baret; Jean-Charles Valladont; Olivier Roy	Italy (ITA); Antonio Carminio; Giuseppe Seimandi; Massimiliano Mandia
Women's Events
Compound Women's individual	(Slovenia) Toja Cerne	(Croatia) Ivana Buden	(France) Sandrine Vandionant-Frangilli
Recurve Women's individual	(Germany) Lisa Unruh	(France) Laure Delfau	(United Kingdom) Naomi Folkard
Barebow Women's individual	(Sweden) Lina Bjorklund	(Italy) Cinzia Noziglia	(Italy) Eleonora Strobbe
Women's team	Austria (AUT); Laurence Baldauff; Petra Goebel (Friedl); Reingild Linhart	Sweden (SWE); Erika Jangnas; Lina Bjorklund; Ulrika Sjöwall	Great Britain (GBR); Naomi Folkard; Victoria Williams; Christie-Lee Ravenscroft

=== Junior events ===
Event	Gold	Silver	Bronze
Men's junior events
Compound Men's individual	(Croatia) Mario Vavro	(United Kingdom) Jordan Mitchell	(Croatia) Domagoj Buden
Recurve Men's individual	(Croatia) Matija Mihalic	(United States) Nathan Yamaguchi	(Czech Republic) Jan Zapletal
Barebow Men's individual	(Italy) Alessio Noceti	(United Kingdom) Craig McCreery	(Netherlands) Mike Cleven
Men's team	Great Britain (GBR); Patrick Huston; Jordan Mitchell; Craig McCreery	Italy (ITA); Luca Valenti; Alessandro Natali; Alessio Noceti	United States (USA); Collin Klimitchek; Justin Dixon; Ryland Hartman
Women's junior events
Compound Women's individual	(Croatia) Maja Orlic	(Norway) Runa Grydeland	(United Kingdom) Rebecca Lennon
Recurve Women's individual	(United States) Miriam Trafford	(United States) Karissa Yamaguchi	(Italy) Laura Baldelli
Barebow Women's individual	(Italy) Anna Carrasco	(United Kingdom) Sophie Benton	(France) Elodie Donval

== Medal table ==
* Host nation (Croatia)

Rank	Nation	Gold	Silver	Bronze	Total
1	United States	4	2	1	7
2	Croatia*	3	1	1	5
3	Italy	2	2	3	7
4	Sweden	2	2	0	4
5	Great Britain	1	4	3	8
6	Slovenia	1	0	1	2
7	Austria	1	0	0	1
7	Germany	1	0	0	1
9	France	0	3	3	6
10	Norway	0	1	0	1
11	Australia	0	0	1	1
11	Czech Republic	0	0	1	1
11	Netherlands	0	0	1	1
Totals (13 entries)		15	15	15	45
