= 1994 World Field Archery Championships =

- Location: Vertus, France

The 1994 World Field Archery Championships was the 14th edition of the World Field Archery Championships and were held in Vertus, France.

== Medal summary (Men's individual) ==
| Event | Gold | Silver | Bronze |
|---|---|---|---|
| Barebow Men's individual | (Italy) Alessandro Gaudenti | (United States) Bob Burns | (Germany) Ladislav Voboril |
| Freestyle Men's individual | (Italy) Andrea Parenti | (Germany) Sven Giesa | (Australia) Matthew Gray |
| Compound Men's individual | (Denmark) Tom Henriksen | (Italy) Mario Ruele | (United States) Michael Leiter |

== Medal summary (Women's individual) ==
| Event | Gold | Silver | Bronze |
|---|---|---|---|
| Barebow Women's individual | (France) Odile Boussière | (Sweden) Marie Palm | (Germany) Jutta Schneider |
| Freestyle Women's individual | (Sweden) Jenny Sjouall | (Sweden) Carina Henriksson | (Germany) Hedi Mittermaier |
| Compound Women's individual | (United States) Michelle Ragsdale | (Sweden) Petra Eriksson | (Denmark) Susanne Kessler |

== Medal summary (Men's Team) ==
| Event | Gold | Silver | Bronze |
|---|---|---|---|
| Team Event | France (FRA); Jean-François Maranzana; Philippe Boistard; Jean-Paul Laury | Great Britain (GBR); Roy Mundon; Dave Jones; Jon Shales | Sweden (SWE); Göran Bjerendal; Morgan Lundin; Sven Anderson |

== Medal summary (Women's Team) ==
| Event | Gold | Silver | Bronze |
|---|---|---|---|
| Team Event | Germany (GER); Jutta Schneider; Ellen Spranger; Hedi Mittermaier | France (FRA); Valérie Fabre; Odile Boussière; Carole Ferriou | Sweden (SWE); Petra Eriksson; Marie Palm; Jenny Sjouall |
