= 2010 World Field Archery Championships =

International archery competition

- Location: Visegrád, Hungary
- Start date: 13 July
- End date: 18 July

The 2010 World Field Archery Championships was the 22nd edition of the World Field Archery Championships and were held in Visegrád, Hungary.

== Medal summary (Men's individual) ==
Event	Gold	Silver	Bronze
Compound Men's individual	(United States) Dave Cousins	(United States) Kevin Wilkey	(France) Jeremy Thierry
Recurve Men's individual	(United Kingdom) Alan Wills	(United Kingdom) Jon Shales	(Germany) Sebastian Rohrberg
Barebow Men's individual	(Finland) Pasi Ahjokivi	(Italy) Giuseppe Seimandi	(Italy) Sergio Massimo Cassiani

== Medal summary (Women's individual) ==
Event	Gold	Silver	Bronze
Compound Women's individual	(Finland) Anne Lantee	(Sweden) Isabell Danielsson	(Belgium) Gladys Willems
Recurve Women's individual	(Sweden) Christine Bjerendal	(United Kingdom) Naomi Folkard	(Italy) Jessica Tomasi
Barebow Women's individual	(Italy) Eleonora Strobbe	(France) Christine Gauthe	(Germany) Monika Jentges

== Medal summary (Men's Team) ==
Event	Gold	Silver	Bronze
Team Event	Finland (FIN); Vesa Tarhala; Jari Haavisto; Pasi Ahjokivi	Germany (GER); Sebastian Rohrberg; Marcus Laube; Josef Meyer	Italy (ITA); Michele Frangilli; Silvio Giorcelli; Giuseppe Seimandi

== Medal summary (Women's Team) ==
Event	Gold	Silver	Bronze
Team Event	Germany (GER); Elena Richter; Ulrike Wiese; Monika Jentges	Sweden (SWE); Christine Bjerendal; Isabell Danielsson; Lina Bjorklund	Italy (ITA); Eleonora Strobbe; Jessica Tomasi; Roberta Telani

== Medal summary (Men's Juniors) ==
Event	Gold	Silver	Bronze
Compound Men's individual	(United States) Sean Elsa	(Germany) Florian Oswald	(United Kingdom) Alex Bridgman
Recurve Men's individual	(Australia) Jarrod Nicholson	(Italy) Marco Morello	(Germany) Florian Dorer
Barebow Men's individual	(France) Raphael Petit Minuesa	(Sweden) Kalle Puman	(Italy) Marco Spano

== Medal summary (Women's Juniors) ==
Event	Gold	Silver	Bronze
Compound Women's individual	(France) Emeline Salmon	(United States) Hunter Jackson	(Italy) Anastasia Anastasio
Recurve Women's individual	(Belgium) Zoe Gobbels	(Italy) Elenea Morabito	(Slovenia) Ana Umer

== Medal summary (Junior Men's Team) ==
Event	Gold	Silver	Bronze
Team Event	Germany (GER); Florian Oswald; Florian Dorer; Frederik Althoff	Italy (ITA); Marco Morello; Francesco Mucci; Marco Spano	France (FRA); Fabien Cochin; Julien Boileau; Raphael Petit Minuesa
