= 2005 World Archery Championships – Men's team compound =

The men's team compound competition at the 2005 World Archery Championships took place in June 2005 in Madrid, Spain. 129 archers took part in the men's compound qualification round with no more than 4 from each country, and the 16 teams of 3 archers with the highest cumulative totals (out of a possible 31) qualified for the 4-round knockout round, drawn according to their qualification round scores.

== Seeds ==
Seedings were based on the combined total of the team members' qualification scores in the individual ranking rounds. The top 16 teams were assigned places in the draw depending on their overall ranking.

1. (United States) Dave Cousins / Braden Gellenthien / Kevin Polish (champions)
2. (Australia) Patrick Coghlan / Clint Freeman / Dennis Carson (3rd place)
3. (France) Dominique Genet / Sebastian Brasseur / Stephane Sauvignon (1st round)
4. (Italy) Daniele Bauro / Sergio Pagni / Antonio Tosco (1st round)
5. (El Salvador) Jorge Jiménez / Renato Lara / Rigoberto Hernandez (quarterfinal)
6. (United Kingdom) Chris White / Stephen Gooden / Jonathan Mynott (1st round)
7. (Netherlands) Peter Elzinga / Emiel Custers / Fred van Zutphen (quarterfinal)
8. (Belgium) Luc Verdeyen / Sven Mestdagh / Ernest Mertens (1st round)
9. (Mexico) Fernando Becerra / Ruben Ochoa / Armando de la Garza (quarterfinal)
10. (Canada) Kevin Tataryn / Blair Lyon / Kevin Brayford (1st round)
11. (South Africa) Wesley Gates / Septimus Cilliers / Martin Lotz (quarterfinal)
12. (Germany) Stefan Griem / Paul Titscher / Thomas Hasenfuss (1st round)
13. (Denmark) Martin Damsbo / Erik Peder Nielsen / David Hauge (4th place)
14. (Norway) Morten Bøe / Terje Roestad / Thomas Stenvoll (2nd Place)
15. (Switzerland) Patrizio Hofer / Juan Galera / Ernest Jaeggi (1st round)
16. (Finland) Jari Haavisto / Rauno Simula / Timo Kivimaa (1st round)

== Draw ==
1st round
1	United States	261
16	Finland	246
9	Mexico	254
8	Belgium	245
5	El Salvador	258
12	Germany	250
13	Denmark	253
4	Italy	250
3	France	252
14	Norway	253
11	South Africa	250
6	United Kingdom	249
7	Netherlands	258
10	Canada	251
15	Switzerland	251
2	Australia	259

Quarterfinals
1	United States	260
9	Mexico	252
5	El Salvador	254
13	Denmark	257
14	Norway	249*
11	South Africa	249
7	Netherlands	248
2	Australia	254

Semifinals
1	United States	253
13	Denmark	250
14	Norway	248
2	Australia	243

Finals
1	United States	251
14	Norway	226
Third place
13	Denmark	245
2	Australia	246
