= Field archery at the 2009 World Games – Women's recurve =

Field archery women's recurve at the 2009 World Games
- Venue: Chengcing Lake, Kaohsiung, Taiwan
- Dates: 24–26 July 2009
- Competitors: 12 from 9 nations

Medalists
| gold medal | (France) Carole Ferriou |
| silver medal | (Italy) Jessica Tomasi |
| bronze medal | (United Kingdom) Naomi Folkard |

The women's recurve archery competition at the 2009 World Games took place from 24 to 26 July 2009 at the Chengcing Lake in Kaohsiung, Taiwan.

== Competition format ==
A total of 12 archers entered the competition. The best four athletes from preliminary round qualified to the semifinals.

== Results ==
=== Preliminary round ===
| Rank | Archer | Nation | Score | Note |
|---|---|---|---|---|
| 1 | Jessica Tomasi | Italy | 694 | Q |
| 2 | Naomi Folkard | (United Kingdom) Great Britain | 691 | Q |
| 3 | Carole Ferriou | France | 666 | Q |
| 4 | Lisa Unruh | Germany | 657 | Q |
| 5 | Amy Oliver | (United Kingdom) Great Britain | 655 | |
| 6 | Christine Bjerendal | Sweden | 640 | |
| 7 | Huang Cheng-an | Chinese Taipei | 637 | |
| 8 | Dolores Cekada | Slovenia | 622 | |
| 9 | Ute Fleischer | Germany | 620 | |
| 10 | Anna Botto | Italy | 602 | |
| 11 | Marina Prelipcean | Belgium | 591 | |
| | Harriet Hyvärinen | Finland | 102 | DNF |

=== Finals ===
Semifinals
1 | (Italy) Jessica Tomasi | 54
4 | (Germany) Lisa Unruh | 48
2 | (United Kingdom) Naomi Folkard | 48
3 | (France) Carole Ferriou | 51

Finals
1 | (Italy) Jessica Tomasi | 51
3 | (France) Carole Ferriou | 54
Third place
4 | (Germany) Lisa Unruh | 50
2 | (United Kingdom) Naomi Folkard | 51
