= 1982 World Field Archery Championships =

- Location: Kingsclere, England
- Start date: 11 September
- End date: 12 September
- Competitors: 120 from 17 nations

The 1982 World Field Archery Championships was the 8th edition of the World Field Archery Championships and were held in Kingsclere, England.

== Medal summary (Men's individual) ==
Event	Gold	Silver	Bronze
Barebow Men's individual	(Sweden) Anders Rosenberg	(Finland) Jaarmo Hilli	(Sweden) Lars Weren
Freestyle Men's individual	(Sweden) Tommy Quick	(Finland) Kyösti Laasonen	(Sweden) Gjert Bjerendal

== Medal summary (Women's individual) ==
Event	Gold	Silver	Bronze
Barebow Women's individual	(France) Annie Dardenne	(Italy) Adriana Stoppa	(Finland) Sirpa Kontilla
Freestyle Women's individual	(Finland) Carita Jussila	(United Kingdom) Angela Goodall	(Austria) Ursula Valenta
