= Bertoncini =

- Language: Italian

Origin
- Region of origin: Italy

Bertoncini is an Italian surname. Notable people with the surname include:

- Davide Bertoncini (born 1991) Italian footballer
- Gene Bertoncini (born 1937), American musician
- Lisa Buscombe (born Lisa Bertoncini), Canadian archer
- Mario Bertoncini (1932–2019), Italian musician
