= Field archery at the 2009 World Games – Men's recurve =

Field archery men's recurve at the 2009 World Games
- Venue: Chengcing Lake, Kaohsiung, Chinese Taipei
- Dates: 24–26 July 2009
- Competitors: 16 from 14 nations

Medalists
gold medal	(United States) Vic Wunderle
silver medal	(Italy) Michele Frangilli
bronze medal	(Germany) Sebastian Rohrberg

The men's recurve archery competition at the 2009 World Games took place from 24 to 26 July 2009 at the Chengcing Lake in Kaohsiung, Chinese Taipei.

== Competition format ==
A total of 16 archers entered the competition. The best four athletes from preliminary round qualifies to the semifinals.

== Results ==
=== Preliminary round ===
Rank	Archer	Nation	Score	Note
1	Vic Wunderle	United States	745	Q
2	Sebastian Rohrberg	Germany	734	Q
3	Michele Frangilli	Italy	729	Q
4	Yuki Sakaeyama	Japan	726	Q
5	Alan Wills	(United Kingdom) Great Britain	724	
6	Giuliano Palmioli	Italy	720	
7	Cedric Byrotheau	France	702	
8	Jonathan Shales	(United Kingdom) Great Britain	698	
9	Lung Ting-hsuan	Chinese Taipei	693	
10	Joseph McGlyn	United States	678	
11	Andreas Heuwing	Germany	674	
12	Gerard Koonings	Netherlands	673	
13	Matija Zlender	Slovenia	667	
14	Rok Mažgon	Slovenia	661	
15	Mikael Olsson	Sweden	649	
16	Niklas Willman	Sweden	535	

=== Finals ===
Semifinals
1	(United States) Vic Wunderle	56
4	(Japan) Yuki Sakaeyama	47
2	(Germany) Sebastian Rohrberg	55(4,1)
3	(Italy) Michele Frangilli	55(4,4)

Finals
1	(United States) Vic Wunderle	62
3	(Italy) Michele Frangilli	55
Third place
4	(Japan) Yuki Sakaeyama	50
2	(Germany) Sebastian Rohrberg	51
