= 1999 World Indoor Archery Championships =

1999 World Indoor Target Archery Championships
- Location: Havana, Cuba
- Start date: March 6
- End date: March 10

The 1999 World Indoor Target Archery Championships were held in Havana, Cuba from 6 - 10 March 1999.

== Medal summary (Men's individual) ==
Event	Gold	Silver	Bronze
Recurve Men's individual	(Sweden) Magnus Petersson	(Ukraine) Markian Ivashko	(South Korea) Chung Jae-hun
Compound Men's individual	(United States) James Butts	(United Kingdom) Jonathan Mynott	(United Kingdom) Simon Tarplee

== Medal summary (Women's individual) ==
Event	Gold	Silver	Bronze
Recurve Women's individual	(Moldova) Natalia Valeeva	(Ukraine) Svitlana Bard	(Poland) Agata Bulwa
Compound Women's individual	(United States) Ashley Kamuf	(Italy) Fabiola Panazzini	(United Kingdom) Claire Treneman

== Medal summary (Men's team) ==
Event	Gold	Silver	Bronze
Recurve Men's team	Australia (AUS); Simon Fairweather; Matthew Gray; Scott Hunter-Russell	Italy (ITA); Michele Frangili; Matteo Bisiani; Ilario Di Buo	Germany (GER); Alexander Froese; Michael Frankenberg; Thilo Koch
Compound Men's team	United States (USA); James Butts; Mark Pennaz; Dee Wilde	Great Britain (GBR); Simon Tarplee; Michael Peart; Jonathan Mynott	Sweden (SWE); Morgan Lundin; Peter Andersson; Björn Andersson

== Medal summary (Women's team) ==
Event	Gold	Silver	Bronze
Recurve Women's team	France (FRA); Sylvie Pissis; Céline Lizzul; Alexandra Fouace	Turkey (TUR); Natalia Nasardize; Elif Altinkaynak; Deniz Gunay	Ukraine (UKR); Tetyana Berezna; Svitlana Bard; Olena Sadovnycha
Compound Women's team	France (FRA); Catherine Pellen; Michèle Deloraine; Cathérine Debourg	Switzerland (SWI); Sylviane Lambelet; Rita Riedo; Karin Probst	United States (USA); Ashley Kamuf; Glenda Doran; Jahna Davis
