= Field archery at the 2009 World Games – Men's compound =

Field archery men's compound at the 2009 World Games
- Venue: Chengcing Lake, Kaohsiung, Taiwan
- Dates: 24–26 July 2009
- Competitors: 24 from 17 nations

Medalists
| gold medal | (United States) Kevin Wilkey |
| silver medal | (Italy) Alessandro Lodetti |
| bronze medal | (United Kingdom) Chris White |

The men's compound archery competition at the 2009 World Games took place from 24 to 26 July 2009 at the Chengcing Lake in Kaohsiung, Taiwan.

== Competition format ==
A total of 24 archers entered the competition. The best four athletes from preliminary round qualifies to the semifinals.

== Results ==
=== Preliminary round ===
| Rank | Archer | Nation | Score | Note |
|---|---|---|---|---|
| 1 | Chris White | (United Kingdom) Great Britain | 818 | Q |
| 2 | Sander Dolderman | Netherlands | 811 | Q |
| 3 | Kevin Wilkey | United States | 810 | Q |
| 4 | Alessandro Lodetti | Italy | 809 | Q |
| 5 | Marko Järvenpää | Finland | 807 | |
| 6 | Rod Menzer | United States | 805 | |
| 7 | Jens Asbach | Germany | 794 | |
| 8 | Neil Wakelin | (United Kingdom) Great Britain | 791 | |
| 9 | Franck Karsenty | Israel | 790 | |
| 10 | Antonio Carminio | Italy | 789 | |
| 11 | Axel Langweige | Germany | 787 | |
| 12 | Jean Paul Laury | France | 787 | |
| 13 | Bruno Brouille | France | 786 | |
| 14 | Jose Duo Martinez | Spain | 785 | |
| 15 | Sebastien Denayer | Belgium | 785 | |
| 16 | Mats-Inge Smordal | Norway | 783 | |
| 17 | Craig Tyson | Australia | 783 | |
| 18 | Jari Hjerpe | Sweden | 782 | |
| 19 | Wang Chih-hao | Chinese Taipei | 781 | |
| 20 | Tibor Ondrik | Hungary | 774 | |
| 21 | Christian Hedvall | Sweden | 770 | |
| 22 | Žare Krajnc | Slovenia | 761 | |
| 23 | Viktor Erb | Switzerland | 742 | |
| 24 | Uroš Krička | Slovenia | 726 | |

=== Finals ===
Semifinals
1 | (United Kingdom) Chris White | 60
4 | (Italy) Alessandro Lodetti | 63
2 | (Netherlands) Sander Dolderman | 65(4)
3 | (United States) Kevin Wilkey | 65(6)

Finals
4 | (Italy) Alessandro Lodetti | 65
3 | (United States) Kevin Wilkey | 68
Third place
1 | (United Kingdom) Chris White | 64(6,5)
2 | (Netherlands) Sander Dolderman | 64(6,4)
