= Field archery at the 2001 World Games – Women's compound =

Field archery women's compound at the 2001 World Games
- Venue: Opas Skiing Spot, Akita, Japan
- Dates: 17–19 August 2001
- Competitors: 11 from 10 nations

Medalists
gold medal	(United States) Michelle Ragsdale
silver medal	(Italy) Giorgia Solato
bronze medal	(France) Françoise Volle

The women's compound archery competition at the 2001 World Games took place from 17 to 19 August 2001 at the Opas Skiing Spot in Akita, Japan.

== Competition format ==
A total of 11 archers entered the competition. The best four athletes from preliminary round qualifies to the semifinals.

== Results ==
=== Preliminary round ===
Rank	Archer	Nation	Score	Note
1	Michelle Ragsdale	United States	699	Q
2	Ulrika Sjöwall	Sweden	687	Q
3	Giorgia Solato	Italy	681	Q
4	Françoise Volle	France	680	Q
5	Jolanda Willemse	Netherlands	673	
6	Yuko Sumiyoshi	Japan	671	
7	Andrea Buzane	Hungary	655	
8	Satoko Tenjin	Japan	646	
9	Anne-Maria Laurila	Finland	644	
10	Barbara Scott	New Zealand	632	
11	Irena Rosa	Slovenia	632	

=== Finals ===
Semifinals
1	(United States) Michelle Ragsdale	58
4	(France) Françoise Volle	57
2	(Sweden) Ulrika Sjöwall	51
3	(Italy) Giorgia Solato	56

Finals
1	(United States) Michelle Ragsdale	55
3	(Italy) Giorgia Solato	54
Third place
4	(France) Françoise Volle	55
2	(Sweden) Ulrika Sjöwall	53
