= 2006 World Field Archery Championships =

- Location: Gothenburg, Sweden
- Start date: 27 August
- End date: 02 September

The 2006 World Field Archery Championships was the 20th edition of the World Field Archery Championships and were held in Gothenburg, Sweden.

== Medal summary (Men's individual) ==
Event	Gold	Silver	Bronze
Compound Men's individual	(Sweden) Morgan Lundin	(United States) Dave Cousins	(United States) John Dudley
Recurve Men's individual	(Italy) Michele Frangilli	(Germany) Sebastian Rohrberg	(United States) Vic Wunderle
Barebow Men's individual	(Italy) Giuseppe Seimandi	(Sweden) Mathias Larsson	(Italy) Sergio Massimo Cassiani

== Medal summary (Women's individual) ==
Event	Gold	Silver	Bronze
Compound Women's individual	(Germany) Silke Hottecke	(Belgium) Gladys Willems	(United States) Jamie Van Natta
Recurve Women's individual	(Slovenia) Dolores Cekanda	(France) Sophie Dodemont	(United Kingdom) Naomi Folkard
Barebow Women's individual	(Italy) Luciana Pennacchi	(Germany) Monika Jentges	(France) Christine Gauthé

== Medal summary (Men's Team) ==
Event	Gold	Silver	Bronze
Team Event	United States (USA); Dave Cousins; Vic Wunderle; Mark Applegate	Italy (ITA); Michele Frangilli; Antonio Pompeo; Giuseppe Seimandi	Germany (GER); Sebastian Rohrberg; Axel Langweige; Karl-Heinz Clauter

== Medal summary (Women's Team) ==
Event	Gold	Silver	Bronze
Team Event	Sweden (SWE); Ingrid Olofsson; Petra Ericsson; Annika Åhlund	Germany (GER); Manuela Kaltenmark; Silke Hoettecke; Monika Jentges	France (FRA); Sophie Dodemont; Francoise Volle; Christine Gauthé

== Medal summary (Men's Juniors) ==
Event	Gold	Silver	Bronze
Compound Men's individual	(Denmark) Mikkel Norgaard	(Sweden) Mikael Roos	(Sweden) Christian Hedwall
Recurve Men's individual	(Sweden) Lars Eggestig	(Norway) Robert Landskaug	(Finland) Juuso Huhtala
Barebow Men's individual	(Italy) Mattia Careggio	(Czech Republic) Michal Sot	(Slovenia) Urban Jelenc

== Medal summary (Women's Juniors) ==
Event	Gold	Silver	Bronze
Compound Women's individual	(Sweden) Malin Johansson	(Croatia) Tanja Zorman	(Italy) Anastasia Anastasio
Recurve Women's individual	(Sweden) Malin Wallin	not awarded	not awarded
Barebow Women's individual	(Slovenia) Petra Krt	(Sweden) Sara Emanuelsson	(Sweden) Erika Seger

== Medal summary (Junior Men's Team) ==
Event	Gold	Silver	Bronze
Team Event	Italy (ITA); Jacobo Bennati; Daniele Raffolini; Mattia Careggio	Sweden (SWE); Lars Eggestig; Christian Hedwall; Andreas Mouwitz	Slovenia (SVN); Luka Kern; Matjaz Kern; Urban Jelenc
