= 1996 World Field Archery Championships =

- Location: Kranjska Gora, Slovenia

The 1996 World Field Archery Championships was the 15th edition of the World Field Archery Championships and were held in Kranjska Gora, Slovenia.

== Medal summary (Men's individual) ==
Event	Gold	Silver	Bronze
Barebow Men's individual	(Netherlands) Rensco Van Wees	(Netherlands) Twan Cleven	(Sweden) Matthias Larsson
Recurve Men's individual	(Italy) Andrea Parenti	(Belgium) Francis Notenboom	(United Kingdom) Jon Shales
Compound Men's individual	(United States) Jeff Button	(Hungary) Janos Povazson	(France) Stephane Dardenne

== Medal summary (Women's individual) ==
Event	Gold	Silver	Bronze
Barebow Women's individual	(France) Odile Boussière	(United Kingdom) Trish Lovell	(Sweden) Marie Palm
Recurve Women's individual	(France) Carole Ferriou	(Germany) Hedi Mittermaier	(United States) Janet Barrs
Compound Women's individual	(Sweden) Petra Eriksson	(Australia) Nicole Bartlett	(Slovenia) Jozica Emersic

== Medal summary (Men's Team) ==
Event	Gold	Silver	Bronze
Team Event	France (FRA); Stephane Dardenne; Karl Blondeau; Christophe Clement	Italy (ITA); Marco Plebani; Andrea Parenti; Alessandro Gaudenti	Great Britain (GBR); Paul Taylor; Jon Shales; Glyn Edwards

== Medal summary (Women's Team) ==
Event	Gold	Silver	Bronze
Team Event	Sweden (SWE); Petra Ericsson; Liselott Andersson; Marie Palm	France (FRA); Catherine Pellen; Odile Boussière; Carole Ferriou	Italy (ITA); Fabiola Palazzini; Michel Bertolini; Lara Maccarelli
