= Ylva Ivarsson =

Swedish archer (born 1964)

Gun Ylva Marianne Haglund (née Ivarsson) (born 10 November 1964) is a Swedish archer.

== Archery ==
Haglund is related to Maj-Britt Johansson who took part in the 1972 Summer Olympic Games in archery. Her parents were also archers.

Haglund competed at the 1984 Summer Olympic Games in the women's individual event and finished 26th with 2420 points scored.

She received a Stora Grabbars award in 1985.

At the 1992 World Field Archery Championships she won a silver medal in the women's team event.
