= 1978 World Field Archery Championships =

- Location: Geneva, Switzerland
- Start date: 16 September
- End date: 17 September
- Competitors: 109 from 21 nations

The 1978 World Field Archery Championships was the 6th edition of the World Field Archery Championships and were held in Geneva, Switzerland.

== Medal summary (Men's individual) ==
Event	Gold	Silver	Bronze
Instinctive Men's individual	(Sweden) Anders Rosenberg	(Finland) Pekka Mertanen	(Sweden) Mats Palmer
Freestyle Men's individual	(United States) Darrell Pace	(United States) Richard McKinney	(Sweden) Gert Bjerendal

== Medal summary (Women's individual) ==
Event	Gold	Silver	Bronze
Instinctive Women's individual	(Japan) Suizuki Kubuchi	(Italy) Anne Cecchini	(Sweden) Ingegard Grandqvist
Freestyle Women's individual	(West Germany) Annemarie Lehmann	(Austria) Ursula Valenta	(United States) Irene Daubenspeck

== Medal table ==
Rank	Nation	Gold	Silver	Bronze	Total
1	United States	1	1	1	3
2	Sweden	1	0	3	4
3	Japan	1	0	0	1
3	West Germany	1	0	0	1
5	Austria	0	1	0	1
5	Finland	0	1	0	1
5	Italy	0	1	0	1
Totals (7 entries)		4	4	4	12
