= Field archery at the 2009 World Games – Men's barebow =

Field archery men's barebow at the 2009 World Games
- Venue: Chengcing Lake, Kaohsiung, Taiwan
- Dates: 24–26 July 2009
- Competitors: 16 from 11 nations

Medalists
gold medal	(Italy) Giuseppe Seimandi
silver medal	(Finland) Pasi Ahjokivi
bronze medal	(Italy) Sergio Cassiani

The men's barebow archery competition at the 2009 World Games took place from 24 to 26 July 2009 at the Chengcing Lake in Kaohsiung, Taiwan.

== Competition format ==
A total of 16 archers entered the competition. The best four athletes from preliminary round qualifies to the semifinals.

== Results ==
=== Preliminary round ===
Rank	Archer	Nation	Score	Note
1	Giuseppe Seimandi	Italy (ITA)	721	Q
2	Pasi Ahjokivi	Finland (FIN)	677	Q
3	Sergio Cassiani	Italy (ITA)	671	Q
4	Martin Ottosson	Sweden (SWE)	647	Q
5	Mihae Kosec	Slovenia (SLO)	642	
6	Marjan Podrzaj	Slovenia (SLO)	640	
7	Kuti Geza	Hungary (HUN)	640	
8	Josef Meyer	Germany (GER)	634	
9	Franz Haberler	Austria (AUT)	632	
10	Erik Jonsson	Sweden (SWE)	631	
11	Mark Applegate	United States (USA)	628	
12	Tien Wen-tsai	Chinese Taipei (TPE)	623	
13	Ernst Crome	Germany (GER)	601	
14	Robert Mallon	Great Britain (GBR)	599	
15	Bernard Dumon	France (FRA)	588	
16	Charles Trafford IV	United States (USA)	584	

=== Finals ===
Semifinals
1	Giuseppe Seimandi (ITA)	53
4	Martin Ottosson (SWE)	45
2	Pasi Ahjokivi (FIN)	52
3	Sergio Cassiani (ITA)	54

Finals
1	Giuseppe Seimandi (ITA)	57
2	Pasi Ahjokivi (FIN)	53
Third place
4	Martin Ottosson (SWE)	45
3	Sergio Cassiani (ITA)	53
