= Angela Goodall =

British archer (born 1961)

Angela Oakley (née Goodall) (born 29 August 1961 in Glasgow) is a British former archer.

== Archery ==
Goodall competed at the 1982 World Field Archery Championships and European Field Championships winning a silver medal in both events.

She took part in the 1982 Commonwealth Games and finished 17th.

In 1984 she won gold at the European Field Championships and silver at the World Field Archery Championships. At the Olympics she came thirtieth.
