= 1972 World Field Archery Championships =

- Location: Gorizia, Italy
- Start date: 16 September
- End date: 17 September
- Competitors: 69 from 17 nations

The 1972 World Field Archery Championships was the 3rd edition of the World Field Archery Championships and were held in Gorizia, Italy.

== Medal summary (Men's individual) ==
Event	Gold	Silver	Bronze
Instinctive Men's individual	(Sweden) Leif Berggren	(Sweden) Kjell Karlsson	(Finland) Veijo Sarvi
Freestyle Men's individual	(United States) John Williams	(United States) Dennis McComak	(Sweden) Erik Karlsson

== Medal summary (Women's individual) ==
Event	Gold	Silver	Bronze
Instinctive Women's individual	(Sweden) Ingegerd Grandqvist	(United Kingdom) Barbara Fielding	(United States) Eunice Schewe
Freestyle Women's individual	(United States) Maureen Bechdolt	(Sweden) Maj-Britt Johansson	(Sweden) Irma Danielsson
