= 1980 World Field Archery Championships =

Sporting event

- Location: Palmerston North, New Zealand
- Start date: 22 November
- End date: 23 November
- Competitors: 95 from 14 nations

The 1980 World Field Archery Championshipswas the 7th edition of the World Field Archery Championships and were held in Palmerston North, New Zealand.

== Medal summary (Men's individual) ==
Event	Gold	Silver	Bronze
Instinctive Men's individual	(Sweden) Anders Rosenberg	(Sweden) Lars Weren	(United Kingdom) Roy Mundon
Freestyle Men's individual	(Sweden) Tommy Persson	(United States) Richard McKinney	(Finland) Kyösti Laasonen

== Medal summary (Women's individual) ==
Event	Gold	Silver	Bronze
Instinctive Women's individual	(Finland) Sirpa Kontilla	(Japan) Suizuki Kubuchi	(Italy) Adriana Stoppa
Freestyle Women's individual	(Finland) Carita Jussila	(Italy) Silvana Velia	(West Germany) Annemarie Lehmann
