= 1976 World Field Archery Championships =

- Location: Mölndal, Sweden
- Start date: 04 September
- End date: 05 September
- Competitors: 103 from 18 nations

The 1976 World Field Archery Championshipswas the 5th edition of the World Field Archery Championships and were held in Mölndal, Sweden.

== Medal summary (Men's individual) ==
Event	Gold	Silver	Bronze
Barebow Men's individual	(Finland) Jukka Virtanen	(Finland) Veijo Sarvi	(United States) Frank Ditzler
Freestyle Men's individual	(Sweden) Tommy Persson	(Sweden) Gert Bjerendal	(United States) Larry Smith

== Medal summary (Women's individual) ==
Event	Gold	Silver	Bronze
Barebow Women's individual	(United Kingdom) Shirley Sandiford	(United Kingdom) Barbara Fielding	(Finland) Anita Järveläinen
Freestyle Women's individual	(West Germany) Annemarie Lehmann	(United States) Irene Daubenspeck	(Sweden) Barbro Lindqvist
