= Jesse Broadwater =

American archer (born 1984)

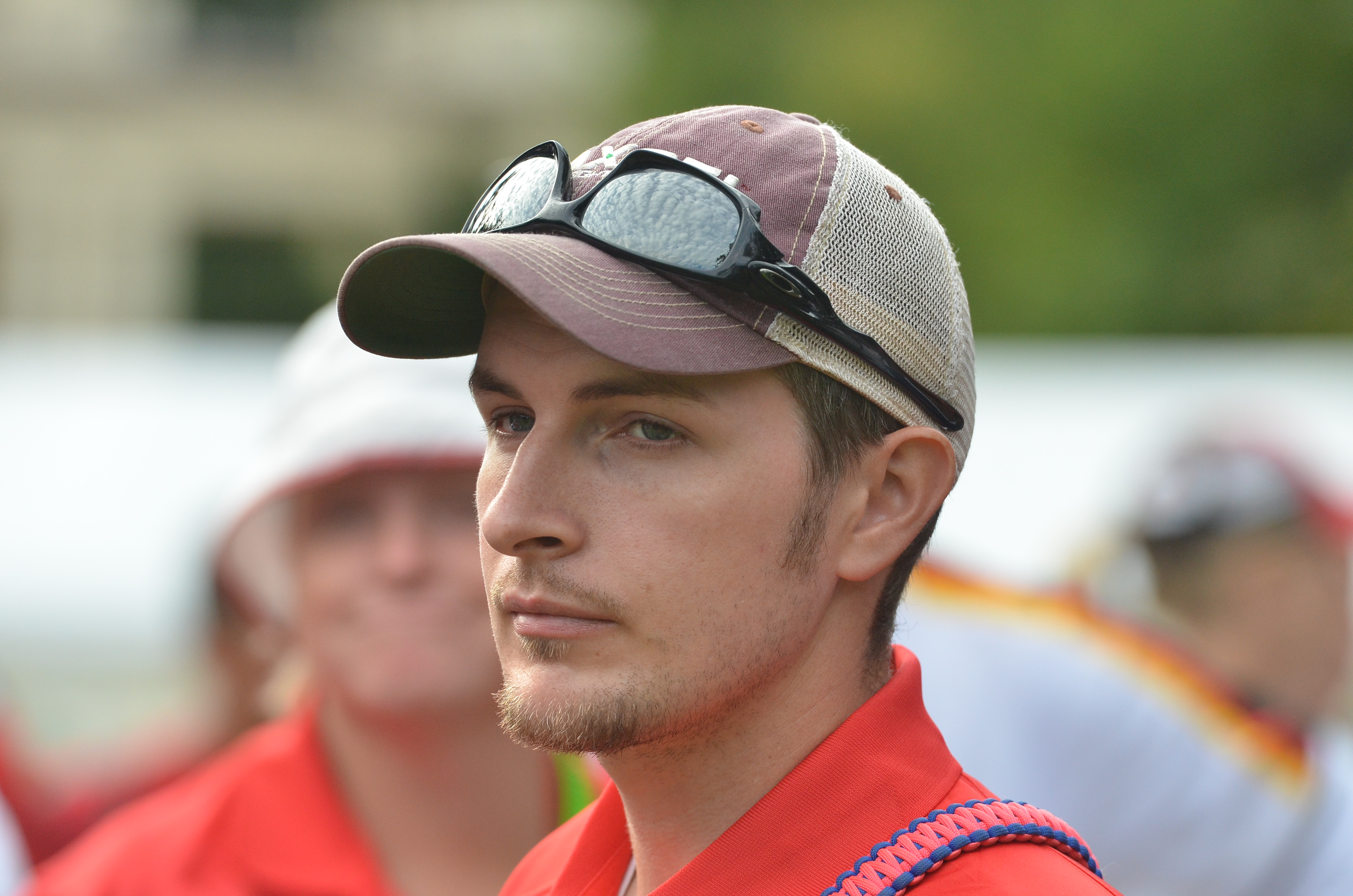
- Broadwater in 2014

Personal information
- Born: January 9, 1984 (age 42) Garrett County, Maryland, U.S.
Medal record
Men's compound archery
Representing United States
World Championships
Gold medal – first place	2011 Turin	Team
Silver medal – second place	2011 Turin	Individual
Bronze medal – third place	2013 Belek	Mixed team
World Indoor Championships
Gold medal – first place	2009 Rzeszów	Team
Gold medal – first place	2014 Nîmes	Team
Silver medal – second place	2009 Rzeszów	Individual
World Field Championships
Gold medal – first place	2012 Val d'Isère	Individual
Gold medal – first place	2014 Zagreb	Individual
Gold medal – first place	2014 Zagreb	Team

Jesse Broadwater (born January 9, 1984), is an American compound archer. His achievements include gold medals at the outdoor, indoor and field World Archery Championships (2012 and 2014), qualifying in first position for the 2013 World Archery Championships, and achieving a career high ranking of 6 in 2013.
