= Ivana Buden =

Croatian archer (born 1985)

Medal record

Women's archery

Representing Croatia

World Championships
Silver medal – second place	2013 Belek	Individual

World Cup
Bronze medal – third place	2009 Copenhagen	Individual

World Field Archery Championships
Gold medal – first place	2012 Val d'Isère	Individual
Silver medal – second place	2014 Zagreb	Individual

World Games
Bronze medal – third place	2009 Kaohsiung	Compound

Ivana Buden (born 10 September 1985) is a Croatian compound archer. She has won medals at the major World Archery Federation competitions, the World Cup and the World Archery Championships. The highest ranking she has reached is first in the World Archery Rankings, most recently in July 2009.

== Achievements ==
2004
31st, European Outdoor Championships, individual, Brussels
(bronze) European Grand Prix, individual, Wyhl
2005
42nd, World Outdoor Championships, individual, Madrid
4th, Summer Universiade, individual, İzmir
2006
(silver) World Cup, women's team, Antalya
7th, European Outdoor Championships, individual, Athens
2007
5th, World Indoor Championships, individual, İzmir
6th, World Outdoor Championships, individual, Leipzig
2008
(silver) World Cup, individual, Santo Domingo
4th, European Outdoor Championships, individual, Vittel
(bronze) World Cup, individual, Antalya
2009
20th, World Indoor Championships, individual, Rzeszów
(silver) World Cup, individual, Poreč
9th, Summer Universiade, women's team, Belgrade
12th, Summer Universiade, individual, Belgrade
22nd, World Outdoor Championships, individual, Ulsan
(bronze) World Cup Final, individual, Copenhagen

2010
9th, European Outdoor Championships, women's team, Rovereto
9th, European Outdoor Championships, mixed team, Rovereto
17th, European Outdoor Championships, individual, Rovereto
2011
(silver) World Cup, individual, Antalya
17th, World Outdoor Championships, individual, Turin
27th, World Outdoor Championships, mixed team, Turin
2012
17th, World Indoor Championships, individual, Las Vegas
7th, Indoor World Cup Final, individual, Las Vegas
5th, European Outdoor Championships, individual, Amsterdam
7th, European Outdoor Championships, mixed team, Amsterdam
9th, European Outdoor Championships, women's team, Amsterdam
