= Dave Cousins (archer) =

American archer (born 1977)

Personal information
- Born: April 16, 1977 (age 49)
Medal record
Men's compound archery
Representing United States
World Championships
| Gold medal – first place | 1999 Riom | Individual |
| Gold medal – first place | 1999 Riom | Team |
| Gold medal – first place | 2003 New York City | Team |
| Gold medal – first place | 2005 Madrid | Team |
| Gold medal – first place | 2009 Ulsan | Team |
| Silver medal – second place | 2003 New York City | Individual |
World Field Championships
| Gold medal – first place | 2002 Canberra | Individual |
| Gold medal – first place | 2010 Visegrád | Individual |
| Gold medal – first place | 2022 Yankton | Individual |
| Gold medal – first place | 2022 Yankton | Mixed team |
| Silver medal – second place | 1998 Obergurgl | Individual |
| Silver medal – second place | 2000 Cortina d'Ampezzo | Individual |
| Silver medal – second place | 2006 Gothenburg | Individual |
| Bronze medal – third place | 2008 Llwynypia & Cardiff | Individual |
| Bronze medal – third place | 2012 Val d'Isère | Individual |
| Bronze medal – third place | 2022 Yankton | Team |
World Indoor Championships
| Gold medal – first place | 2003 Nîmes | Team |
| Gold medal – first place | 2005 Aalborg | Team |
| Gold medal – first place | 2007 İzmir | Team |
| Silver medal – second place | 2001 Florence | Team |
| Bronze medal – third place | 2001 Florence | Individual |
World 3D Championships
| Gold medal – first place | 2013 Sassari | Individual |
World Games
| Gold medal – first place | 2001 Akita | Individual |
| Bronze medal – third place | 2005 Duisburg | Individual |

Dave Cousins (born April 16, 1977) is an American compound archer and former number one ranked compound archer in the world.

== Career ==
He held the FITA 720 world record with a score of 712 until it was broken by Canadian Dietmar Trillus. Dietmar's record stood at 713 until it was beaten by Liam Grimwood in July 2011.

He has shot the most 1400 gents fitas recorded in history by one archer. He has competed several times at International Archery Federation (FITA) world championships in the men's compound division.

He finished 2nd in 2003 at the 42nd World Outdoor Target Championship, 18th in 2005 at the 43rd World Outdoor Target Archery Championships, 9th at the 9th Indoor Archery World Championship in 2007, and 33rd at the Archery World Championships in 2009.

In 2010, he won the world field championships held in Visegrád, Hungary. He was last ranked number 1 in the world by FITA on June 20, 2005.
