= Lucille Lessard =

Canadian archer (born 1957)

Personal information
- Born: May 26, 1957 (age 69) Quebec City, Quebec, Canada
Medal record
Women's archery
Representing Canada
World Field Championships
| Gold medal – first place | 1974 Zagreb | Freestyle |

Lucille Lessard (born May 26, 1957, Quebec City, Canada) is a Canadian archer

Introduced to the sport of archery while in high school she won the 1972 Canadian Junior Championship in Field Archery. In 1973 she won the National Target Outdoor Junior Championship. She won her 1st National Outdoor Senior Championship in 1974 at just 17 and defended her title in 1975 and 1980. She gained the title of women's champion of World Field in 1974, and was champion of Americas in 1975. Field Archery means competitors face targets at various distances on varied terrain. That same year she was top female athlete in Quebec and she won the Elaine Tanner Award as Canada's Junior Athlete of the Year. She also won the Canadian Indoor National Championships in 1975 and 1976. After having been classified seventh with the championships of the world, in 1975, she was held with high hopes for the Canadian Olympic team for 1976 in Montreal but did not make the 1976 Canadian Olympic Team. In 1977 she was inducted into the Canadian Sport Hall of Fame. She made the Canadian archery Olympic team in 1980 but Canada boycotted the Moscow Games.
