= 2012 World Field Archery Championships =

International archery competition

- Location: Val-d'Isère, France
- Start date: 14 August
- End date: 19 August

The 2012 World Field Archery Championships was the 23rd edition of the World Field Archery Championships and were held in Val-d'Isère, France.

== Medal summary ==
=== Men's individual ===
Event	Gold	Silver	Bronze
Compound Men's individual	(United States) Jesse Broadwater	(Slovenia) Slavko Tursic	(United States) Dave Cousins
Recurve Men's individual	(France) Jean-Charles Valladont	(United States) Jake Kaminski	(United Kingdom) Jon Shales
Barebow Men's individual	(Spain) Sebastian Juanola Codina	(United States) Alan Eagleton	(Italy) Giuseppe Seimandi

=== Women's individual ===
Event	Gold	Silver	Bronze
Compound Women's individual	(Croatia) Ivana Buden	(United States) Paige Pearce	(Austria) Petra Goebel
Recurve Women's individual	(Germany) Elena Richter	(Belgium) Zoe Gobbels	(United Kingdom) Naomi Folkard
Barebow Women's individual	(Sweden) Lina Bjorklund	(Italy) Elenora Strobbe	(Germany) Monika Jentges

=== Men's Team ===
Event	Gold	Silver	Bronze
Team Event	United States (USA); Dave Cousins; Alan Eagleton; Jake Kaminski	Finland (FIN); Pasi Ahjokivi; Jari Haavisto; Juuso Huhtala	France (FRA); Christophe Doussot; Olivier Roy; Jean-Charles Valladont

=== Women's Team ===
Event	Gold	Silver	Bronze
Team Event	Great Britain (GBR); Tracy Anderson; Naomi Folkard; Elizabeth Rees	France (FRA); Sophie Dodemont; Eliette Lalouer; Sandrine Vandionant-Frangilli	Germany (GER); Silke Hoettecke; Ulrike Koini; Elena Richter

=== Men's Juniors ===
Event	Gold	Silver	Bronze
Compound Men's individual	(Belgium) Renaud Domanski	(United Kingdom) Alex Bridgman	(Croatia) Domagoj Buden
Recurve Men's individual	(Sweden) Jesper Fredriksson	(Italy) Marco Morello	(Norway) Paul Andre Hagen

=== Women's Juniors ===
Event	Gold	Silver	Bronze
Compound Women's individual	(Italy) Sabrina Franzoi	(Croatia) Maja Orlic	(Norway) Runa Grydeland
Recurve Women's individual	(France) Marion Vives	(Finland) Mirjam Tuokkola	(Netherlands) Sandra van der Looy

=== Junior Men's Team ===
Event	Gold	Silver	Bronze
Team Event	Germany (GER); Henrik Hornung; Eike Jacob; Timo Schott	Great Britain (GBR); Alex Bridgman; Robert Mallon; Mark Nesbitt	Slovenia (SVN); Marko Berus; Jan Rijavec; Luka Stosevski

=== Junior Women's Team ===
Event	Gold	Silver	Bronze
Team Event	Great Britain (GBR); Daisy Clark; Bryony Pitman; Evangeline Rawlings	Italy (ITA); Annalisa Agamennoni; Evelina Cataldo; Sabrina Franzoi	United States (USA); Emily Fischer; Kathryn Fischer; Heather Trafford

== Medal table ==
* Host nation (France)

Rank	Nation	Gold	Silver	Bronze	Total
1	United States	2	3	2	7
2	Great Britain	2	2	2	6
3	France*	2	1	1	4
4	Germany	2	0	2	4
5	Sweden	2	0	0	2
6	Italy	1	3	1	5
7	Croatia	1	1	1	3
8	Belgium	1	1	0	2
9	Spain	1	0	0	1
10	Finland	0	2	0	2
11	Slovenia	0	1	1	2
12	Norway	0	0	2	2
13	Austria	0	0	1	1
13	Netherlands	0	0	1	1
Totals (14 entries)		14	14	14	42
