= 1999 World Archery Championships =

- Location: Riom, France
- Start date: 22 July 1999
- End date: 29 July 1999

The 1999 World Archery Championships was the 40th edition of the event. It was held in Riom, France on 22–29 July 1999 and was organized by World Archery Federation (FITA).

== Medals table ==
* Host nation (France)

Rank	Nation	Gold	Silver	Bronze	Total
1	South Korea	2	1	1	4
2	Italy	2	0	1	3
2	United States	2	0	1	3
4	Chinese Taipei	1	1	0	2
5	France*	1	0	1	2
6	Great Britain	0	2	1	3
7	Hungary	0	1	1	2
8	China	0	1	0	1
8	Finland	0	1	0	1
8	Netherlands	0	1	0	1
11	Germany	0	0	2	2
Totals (11 entries)		8	8	8	24

== Medals summary ==
=== Recurve ===
Event	Gold	Silver	Bronze
Men's individual	Hong Sung-chil; South Korea	Jari Lipponen; Finland	Lionel Torres; France
Women's individual	Lee Eun-kyung; South Korea	Alison Williamson; Great Britain	Kim Jo-sun; South Korea
Men's team	Italy; Matteo Bisiani; Michele Frangilli; Ilario di Buo	South Korea; Hong Sung-chil; Kim Bo-ram; Jang Yong-ho	United States; Jay Barrs; Victor Wunderle; Richard Johnson
Women's team	Italy; Giovanna Aldegani; Christina Ioriatti; Natalia Valeeva	China; Lin Sang; Yu Hui; He Ying	Germany; Britta Buehren; Wiebke Nulle; Barbara Mensing

=== Compound ===
Event	Gold	Silver	Bronze
Men's individual	Dave Cousins; United States	Stephen Gooden; Great Britain	Tibor Ondrik; Hungary
Women's individual	Catherine Pellen; France	Shish Ya-ping; Chinese Taipei	Fabiola Palazzini; Italy
Men's team	United States; Dave Cousins; Logan Wilde; Lawrence Wilde	Hungary; Tibor Ondrik; Antal Szokol; Janos Povaszan	United Kingdom; Chris White; Michael Peart; Stephen Gooden
Women's team	Chinese Taipei; Shish Ya-ping; Huang Chong-yu; Shih Pei-yi	Netherlands; Marjon Pigney; Irma Luyting; Annemarie Puts	Germany; Bettina Thiele; Christina Knoebel; Astrid Haehnschen
