= Jan Verhoeven =

Dutch singer (died 2021)

- Born: Jan Verhoeven; December 23, 1937; Herpt
- Died: 24 April 2021 (aged 83)
- Occupation: Singer

Jan Verhoeven (23 December 1937 – 24 April 2021) was a Dutch singer from Heusden. He was the lead member of Holland Duo. He started collaborating with Marianne Weber after spontaneously joining her as a second singer during a party and from 1988 they had the name "Holland Duo". With Weber he recorded three albums. Later he continued under the same name with Colinda van Beckhoven, Janske Mentzij and Erna Temming.

He had a daughter Nina, who was also a singer who released her first single in 1994. Verhoeven died on 24 April 2021, aged 80. After his death, Sterren NL Radio of NPO Radio 5 paid special attention to his death during the afternoon show.
