= 1990 World Field Archery Championships =

International archery competition

- Location: Loen, Norway

The 1990 World Field Archery Championships was the 12th edition of the World Field Archery Championships and were held in Loen, Norway.

== Medal summary (Men's individual) ==
Event	Gold	Silver	Bronze
Barebow Men's individual	(Sweden) Mats Palmer	(Australia) Tony Pitt-Lancaster	(United Kingdom) Roy Mundon
Freestyle Men's individual	(United States) Jay Barrs	(Australia) Simon Fairweather	(Belgium) Frances Noteboom
Compound Men's individual	(United States) Randall Ulmer	(Australia) Leigh Cornish	(Denmark) Niels Baldur

== Medal summary (Women's individual) ==
Event	Gold	Silver	Bronze
Barebow Women's individual	(France) Nadine Visconti	(Italy) Giuseppina Meini	(Sweden) Catarina Digreuw
Freestyle Women's individual	(France) Carole Ferriou	(Sweden) Jenny Sjowall	(United States) Kitty Frazier
Compound Women's individual	(United Kingdom) Ann Shepherd	(France) Valérie Fabre	(Italy) Carmen Ceriotti
