= 1970 World Field Archery Championships =

- Location: Cardiff, Wales
- Start date: 10 September
- End date: 12 September
- Competitors: 70 from 11 nations

The 1970 World Field Archery Championships was the 2nd edition of the World Field Archery Championships and were held in Cardiff, Wales.

== Medal summary (Men's individual) ==
Event	Gold	Silver	Bronze
Instinctive Men's individual	(United States) Elmer Moore	(Sweden) Leif Berggren	(Sweden) Soren Wikingsson
Freestyle Men's individual	(United States) Stephen Lieberman	(United Kingdom) Derek Gunson	(United States) Christopher Labucki

== Medal summary (Women's individual) ==
Event	Gold	Silver	Bronze
Instinctive Women's individual	(United States) Eunice Schewe	(Sweden) Ingegerd Grandqvist	(Sweden) Ester Lindgren
Freestyle Women's individual	(Sweden) Sonia Johansson	(United States) Maureen Bechdolt	(United States) Barbara Brown

== Medal table ==
* Host nation (Wales)

Rank	Nation	Gold	Silver	Bronze	Total
1	United States	3	1	2	6
2	Sweden	1	2	2	5
3	Great Britain	0	1	0	1
Totals (3 entries)		4	4	4	12
