= 1974 World Field Archery Championships =

- Location: (Socialist Federal Republic of Yugoslavia) Zagreb, Yugoslavia
- Start date: 27 August
- End date: 28 August
- Competitors: 89 from 15 nations

The 1974 World Field Archery Championships was the fourth edition of the World Field Archery Championships and were held in Zagreb, Yugoslavia.

== Medal summary (Men's individual) ==
Event	Gold	Silver	Bronze
Barebow Men's individual	(Sweden) Leif Berggren	(Finland) Veijo Sarvi	(United States) Frank Ditzler
Freestyle Men's individual	(United States) Doug Brothers	(United States) Rick Stonebraker	(Sweden) Tommy Persson

== Medal summary (Women's individual) ==
Event	Gold	Silver	Bronze
Barebow Women's individual	(United States) Eunice Schewe	(Sweden) Ingegerd Grandqvist	(Finland) Anita Järveläinen
Freestyle Women's individual	(Canada) Lucille Lessard	(United States) Ruth Wallace	(Italy) Ida Dapoian

== Medal table ==
* Host nation (Yugoslavia)

Rank	Nation	Gold	Silver	Bronze	Total
1	United States	2	2	1	5
2	Sweden	1	1	1	3
3	Canada	1	0	0	1
4	Finland	0	1	1	2
5	Italy	0	0	1	1
Totals (5 entries)		4	4	4	12
