= Maureen Bechdolt =

American archer

Maureen Bechdolt (born 17 July 1952) is an American archer.

== Archery ==
In 1967 Bechdolt became the youngest person to make the United States archery team. Bechdolt finished second in the freestyle women's individual event at the 1971 World Field Archery Championships and first the following year. She competed in the 1972 Summer Olympic Games in the women's individual event and finished 28th with a score of 2218 points.

== Life ==
She was born in Dayton and graduated from the University of Cincinnati in 1974.
