= 1969 World Field Archery Championships =

- Location: Pennsylvania, United States
- Start date: 18 August
- End date: 19 August
- Competitors: 59 from 13 nations

The 1969 World Field Archery Championships were held in Valley Forge, Pennsylvania, United States. This was the inaugural World Field Archery Championships and differed from normal target archery played at Olympic and Commonwealth level. Field archery involved different sized targets, distances and gradients on a field course.

== Medal summary (Men's individual) ==
Event	Gold	Silver	Bronze
Barebow Men's individual	(United States) Warren Cowles	(United States) Emil Lehan	(Finland) Pekka Mertanen
Freestyle Men's individual	(United States) Richard Branstetter Jr.	(Australia) Hans Wright	(Finland) Kyösti Laasonen

== Medal summary (Women's individual) ==
Event	Gold	Silver	Bronze
Barebow Women's individual	(United States) Raye Dabelow	(Sweden) Ingegard Grandqvist	(United States) La Rue Bruce
Freestyle Women's individual	(Sweden) Irma Danielsson	(Sweden) Kerstin Beije	(United States) Janet Ashbaugh

== Medal table ==
* Host nation (United States)

Rank	Nation	Gold	Silver	Bronze	Total
1	United States*	3	1	2	6
2	Sweden	1	2	0	3
3	Australia	0	1	0	1
4	Finland	0	0	2	2
Totals (4 entries)		4	4	4	12
