= Elena Richter =

German archer (born 1989)

Personal information
- Born: 3 July 1989 (age 36) Berlin, East Germany
- Height: 1.74 m (5 ft 9 in)
- Weight: 67 kg (148 lb)

Sport
- Country: Germany
- Sport: Archery
- Event: Recurve
- Club: BSC BB-Berlin
- Coached by: Oliver Haidn
Medal record
Women's recurve archery
Representing Germany
World Field Championships
Gold medal – first place	2012 Val d'Isère	Individual
World Games
Silver medal – second place	2013 Cali	Individual

Elena Richter (born 3 July 1989) is a German retired archer. She contested the 2012 Summer Olympics in the women's individual competition, where she was eliminated in the second knockout round placing 30th place in the preliminary ranking round.

Richter achieved her first senior title with gold medal at the 2012 World Field Archery Championships in Val d'Isère, and became Germany's first female winner of an Archery World Cup gold medal after victory in the tournament's opening stage in Shanghai. Richter was also a three-time German national champion, winning her third title in 2019 after defeating 2016 Olympic silver medalist Lisa Unruh. In 2019, she also won the gold medal in the women's individual event at the 2019 Military World Games held in Wuhan, China.

Richter announced her retirement from archery in August 2020 after the 2020 Summer Olympics were postponed due to the COVID-19 pandemic.
