= Lisa Buscombe =

Canadian archer

Personal information
- National team: Canada
- Citizenship: Canadian
- Born: Lisa Bertoncini
- Education: Mohawk College/McMaster University/University of Toronto

Sport
- Country: Canada
- Sport: Archery
- College team: Mohawk College
Medal record
Women's archery
Representing Canada
World Field Archery Championships
Gold medal – first place	1984 Hyvinkää	Women's individual
Silver medal – second place	1986 Radstadt	Freestyle Women's individual
Representing Canada
World Games
Gold medal – first place	1985 London	Women's recurve

Lisa Buscombe (née Bertoncini) is a Canadian retired archer. Buscombe won various medals in archery championships including gold at the 1984 World Field Archery Championships and 1985 World Games plus a silver medal in the 1986 World Field Archery Championships. In 1985, she was inducted into the Canadian Olympic Hall of Fame.

== Career ==
Buscombe started competing as an archer for Mohawk College in 1975. She won gold medals in archery competitions held by the Ontario Colleges Athletic Association in 1977 and 1978. After college, Buscombe won multiple provincial and national archery championships from 1978 to 1992.

In world championships, Buscombe won gold medals at the 1984 World Field Archery Championships and the 1985 World Games. Buscombe also competed at the 1985 World Archery Championships and 1987 World Archery Championships but did not medal. In 1999, she was selected as an assistant for Canada's archery team at the 1999 Pan American Games and participated at the 1999 World Archery Championships.

== Awards and honours ==
While at Mohawk College, Buscombe was named the college's athlete of the year twice and awarded the Sam Mitminger Award for her performance in athletics and academics. Buscombe was inducted into the Canadian Olympic Hall of Fame in 1985 at the same time as her inductions into the Brampton Sports Hall of Fame and the Canadian Amateur Sports Hall of Fame. Other hall of fames Buscombe were inducted include the Mohawk College Hall of Fame in 1989 and the OCAA Hall of Fame in 2003.
