= 1984 World Field Archery Championships =

- Location: Hyvinkää, Finland
- Start date: 23 August
- End date: 25 August
- Competitors: 111 from 19 nations

The 1984 World Field Archery Championships was the 9th edition of the World Field Archery Championships and were held in Hyvinkää, Finland.

== Medal summary (Men's individual) ==
| Event | Gold | Silver | Bronze |
|---|---|---|---|
| Barebow Men's individual | (Sweden) Lars Weren | (Finland) Timo Heikkinen | (Sweden) Anders Rosenberg |
| Freestyle Men's individual | (Sweden) Gjert Bjerendal | (United States) Richard McKinney | (Finland) Kyösti Laasonen |

== Medal summary (Women's individual) ==
| Event | Gold | Silver | Bronze |
|---|---|---|---|
| Barebow Women's individual | (Italy) Guissepina Meini | (West Germany) Tatiana Zurek | (Sweden) Ulla Forsell |
| Freestyle Women's individual | (Canada) Lisa Buscombe | (United Kingdom) Angela Goodall | (Switzerland) Christine Meier |
