= Maj-Britt Johansson =

Swedish archer (1928–2015)

Maj-Britt Johansson (14 November 1928 – 31 May 2015) was a Swedish archer who represented Sweden at the 1972 Summer Olympic Games in archery.

== Olympics ==
Johansson competed in the women's individual event and finished nineteenth with a total of 2283 points.
