= Giuseppe Seimandi =

Italian archer (born 1987)

Personal information
- Born: 8 January 1987 (age 39) Turin, Italy

Sport
- Sport: Archery
- Event: Barebow
Medal record
Representing Italy
Men's barebow
World Field Championships
Gold medal – first place	2006 Gothenburg	Individual
Gold medal – first place	2008 Llwynypia	Team
Gold medal – first place	2024 Lac La Biche	Mixed team
Silver medal – second place	2006 Gothenburg	Team
Silver medal – second place	2010 Visegrád	Individual
Silver medal – second place	2024 Lac La Biche	Team
Silver medal – second place	2016 Dublin	Team
Bronze medal – third place	2010 Visegrád	Team
Bronze medal – third place	2012 Val d'Isère	Individual
Bronze medal – third place	2014 Zagreb	Team
Bronze medal – third place	2024 Lac La Biche	Individual
World 3D Championships
Gold medal – first place	2007 Sopron	Individual
Gold medal – first place	2022 Terni	Team
Silver medal – second place	2013 Sassari	Individual
Silver medal – second place	2015 Terni	Individual
Bronze medal – third place	2022 Terni	Individual
Bronze medal – third place	2022 Terni	Mixed team
European Indoor Championships
Gold medal – first place	2024 Varaždin	Team
Gold medal – first place	2025 Samsun	Team
Silver medal – second place	2024 Varaždin	Individual
European Field Championships
Gold medal – first place	2023 Cesena	Individual
Gold medal – first place	2023 Cesena	Team
Silver medal – second place	2017 Koper	Individual
Silver medal – second place	2017 Koper	Team
European 3D Championships
Gold medal – first place	2010 Sassari	Individual
Gold medal – first place	2010 Sassari	Team
Gold medal – first place	2025 Divčibare	Mixed team
Bronze medal – third place	2023 Cesana	Individual
Bronze medal – third place	2025 Divčibare	Individual
World Games
Gold medal – first place	2009 Kaohsiung	Individual
Gold medal – first place	2013 Cali	Individual
Men's compound archery
World 3D Championships
Silver medal – second place	2019 Canada Lac la Biche	Individual
European 3D Championships
Gold medal – first place	2016 Mokrice	Team
Gold medal – first place	2018 Gothenburg	Individual
Gold medal – first place	2018 Gothenburg	Team

Giuseppe Seimandi (born 8 January 1987) is an Italian archer who competes in barebow events. He is a three-time World Field Champion.

== Career ==
Seimandi competed at the 2006 World Field Archery Championships and won a gold medal in the individual barebow event and a silver medal in the team event. He then competed at the 2007 World Archery 3D Championships and won a gold medal in the individual event.

He represented Italy at the 2009 World Games and won a gold medal in the barebow event. He repeated as barebow champion at the 2013 World Games.

He competed at the 2012 World Field Archery Championships, and won a bronze medal in the individual event. He again competed at the 2014 World Field Archery Championships and won a bronze medal in the team event. He then won a silver medal in the team event in 2016. At the end of 2016, he switched to compound bow and won a gold medal at the 2016 European Archery 3D Championships in the team event. He then competed at the 2017 World Archery 3D Championships and finished in fifth place in the individual compound event.

In September 2023, he competed at the European Field Archery Championships and won gold medals in the individual, team event the mixed team events, along with Cinzia Noziglia. In September 2024, he competed at the 2024 World Field Archery Championships and won gold in the mixed team event, along with Cinzia Noziglia, silver in the team event, and bronze in the individual event.
