= Tommy Quick =

Swedish archer (1955–2013)

Personal information
- Nationality: Swedish
- Born: 22 July 1955; Skövde, Sweden
- Died: 10 November 2013 (aged 58); Hjo, Sweden

Sport
- Sport: Archery

Tommy Quick (22 July 1955 – 10 November 2013) was a Swedish archer. He competed in the men's individual event at the 1984 Summer Olympics.
