= Gert Bjerendal =

Swedish archer (born 1955)

Personal information
- Nationality: Swedish
- Born: 12 June 1955 (age 69); Mölndal, Sweden

Sport
- Sport: Archery

Gert Bjerendal (born 12 June 1955) is a Swedish archer. He competed at the 1984 Summer Olympics and the 1988 Summer Olympics.
