= Andrea Parenti =

Italian archer

Personal information
- Nationality: Italian
- Born: 26 April 1965 (age 61) Casalecchio di Reno, Italy
- Height: 1.78 m (5 ft 10 in)
- Weight: 80 kg (176 lb)

Sport
- Country: Italy
- Sport: Archery
- Club: Arcieri Re Astolfo
Medal record
Olympic Games
Bronze medal – third place	1996 Atlanta	Team
World Championships
Silver medal – second place	1995 Jakarta	Team
Mediterranean Games
Silver medal – second place	1993 Narbonne	Individual
Silver medal – second place	1993 Narbonne	Team
World Games
Gold medal – first place	1993 The Hague	Field Recurve
Silver medal – second place	1997 Lathi	Field Recurve

Andrea Parenti (born 26 April 1965 in Casalecchio di Reno), is an Italian archer.

== Biography ==
Andrea Parenti won bronze medal with the Italian men's team at the 1996 Summer Olympics, he also participated to two others editions of the Olympic Games (1988 and 1992). He won also a silver medal at the World Archery Championships (1995).

== Olympic results ==
Year	Competition	Venue	Position	Event	Score
1996	Olympic Games	(United States) Atlanta	3rd	Team	248

== See also ==
- Italy at the 1996 Summer Olympics – Medalists
