= Dejan Sitar =

Slovenian archer (born 1979)

Medal record

Men's archery

Representing Slovenia

World Championships
Gold medal – first place	2001 Beijing	Individual
Bronze medal – third place	2005 Madrid	Individual

European Archery Championships
Bronze medal – third place	2010 Rovereto	Mixed Team

Dejan Sitar (born 9 December 1979), is a Slovenian compound archer. He was the 2001 World Champion and was the world number one ranked archer for nearly two years from December 2001 to September 2003.
