= Obergurgl =

Village in Tyrol, Austria

- Village
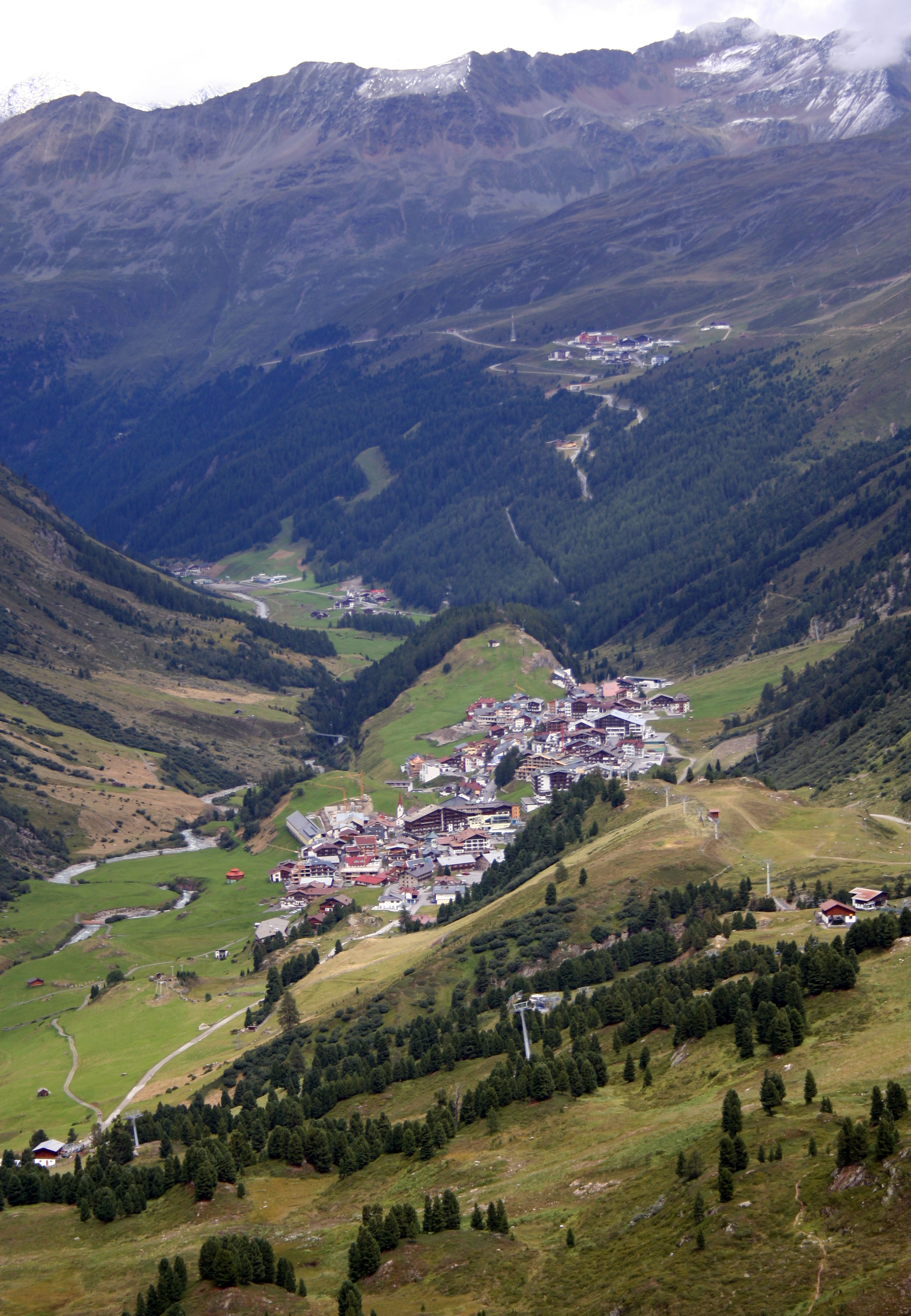
- A view of Obergurgl (below) and Hochgurgl (above) in summer, looking north. The road climbing past Hochgurgl goes to Italy via Timmelsjoch.

- Location within Austria
- Coordinates: 46°52′N 11°01′E
- Country: Austria
- State: Tyrol
- Municipality: Sölden
- Elevation: 1,930 m (6,330 ft)

Population
  - Total: 400

Obergurgl is a village in the Ötztal Alps in Tyrol, Austria. Located in the municipality of Sölden, the village has approximately 400 year-round inhabitants, and is mainly a tourist resort.

At an elevation of 1,930 m (6,330 ft), Obergurgl is the highest parish in Austria. The parish church was consecrated in 1737, and in 1967 extensions were added based on plans by Clemens Holzmeister.

Obergurgl forms part of the ski resort area of Obergurgl-Hochgurgl and lies at the southern end of the Ötztal Gurglertal valley, the longest side valley off the Inntal valley. It is a popular hiking area during the summer, with hanging valleys to the east that lead over into the Italian province of South Tyrol. There are numerous peaks over 3,500 m (11,500 ft) and several glaciers, which offer the more adventurous hikers a challenge.

There is a breeding establishment for Haflinger horses in the village, which is owned by the Scheiber family, who also own the Hotel Edelweiss & Gurgl.

Obergurgl became famous in 1931, when the Swiss explorer Auguste Piccard was forced to land on the nearby Großer Gurgler Ferner glacier during his historic balloon flight, during which he became the first man to fly into the stratosphere.

== Climate ==
Obergurgl has a subarctic climate (Koppen: Dfc) bordering on a tundra climate (ET). Summers are cool and rainy, while winters are cold and extremely snowy. Annual snowfall averages 475.5 cm (187.2 inches) with heavy snowfall falling from October through May with light snowfall in June and September. Snowfall in the summer months of July and August is not rare, and may happen once every few years.

Climate data for Obergurgl: 1941m (1991−2020)
Month	Jan	Feb	Mar	Apr	May	Jun	Jul	Aug	Sep	Oct	Nov	Dec	Year
Record high °C (°F)	9.6 (49.3)	10.9 (51.6)	13.2 (55.8)	16.3 (61.3)	22.4 (72.3)	27.3 (81.1)	26.5 (79.7)	26.4 (79.5)	25.1 (77.2)	21.9 (71.4)	15.3 (59.5)	9.9 (49.8)	27.3 (81.1)
Mean daily maximum °C (°F)	−0.8 (30.6)	−0.1 (31.8)	2.9 (37.2)	6.2 (43.2)	10.8 (51.4)	15.2 (59.4)	16.8 (62.2)	16.5 (61.7)	12.8 (55.0)	8.8 (47.8)	3.4 (38.1)	−0.4 (31.3)	7.7 (45.8)
Daily mean °C (°F)	−4.6 (23.7)	−4.4 (24.1)	−1.5 (29.3)	1.9 (35.4)	6.5 (43.7)	10.2 (50.4)	12.2 (54.0)	12.1 (53.8)	8.1 (46.6)	4.8 (40.6)	−0.3 (31.5)	−3.9 (25.0)	3.4 (38.2)
Mean daily minimum °C (°F)	−8.1 (17.4)	−9.3 (15.3)	−5.7 (21.7)	−2.4 (27.7)	1.7 (35.1)	5.1 (41.2)	6.6 (43.9)	6.8 (44.2)	3.5 (38.3)	0.5 (32.9)	−3.9 (25.0)	−7.0 (19.4)	−1.0 (30.2)
Record low °C (°F)	−22.0 (−7.6)	−26.1 (−15.0)	−23.7 (−10.7)	−17.2 (1.0)	−8.8 (16.2)	−4.7 (23.5)	−1.6 (29.1)	−1.5 (29.3)	−7.0 (19.4)	−14.5 (5.9)	−18.4 (−1.1)	−23.4 (−10.1)	−26.1 (−15.0)
Average precipitation mm (inches)	53.5 (2.11)	45.5 (1.79)	55.8 (2.20)	61.3 (2.41)	78.3 (3.08)	92.1 (3.63)	98.5 (3.88)	107.4 (4.23)	71.1 (2.80)	86.3 (3.40)	90.2 (3.55)	63.3 (2.49)	903.3 (35.57)
Source: Central Institute for Meteorology and Geodynamics

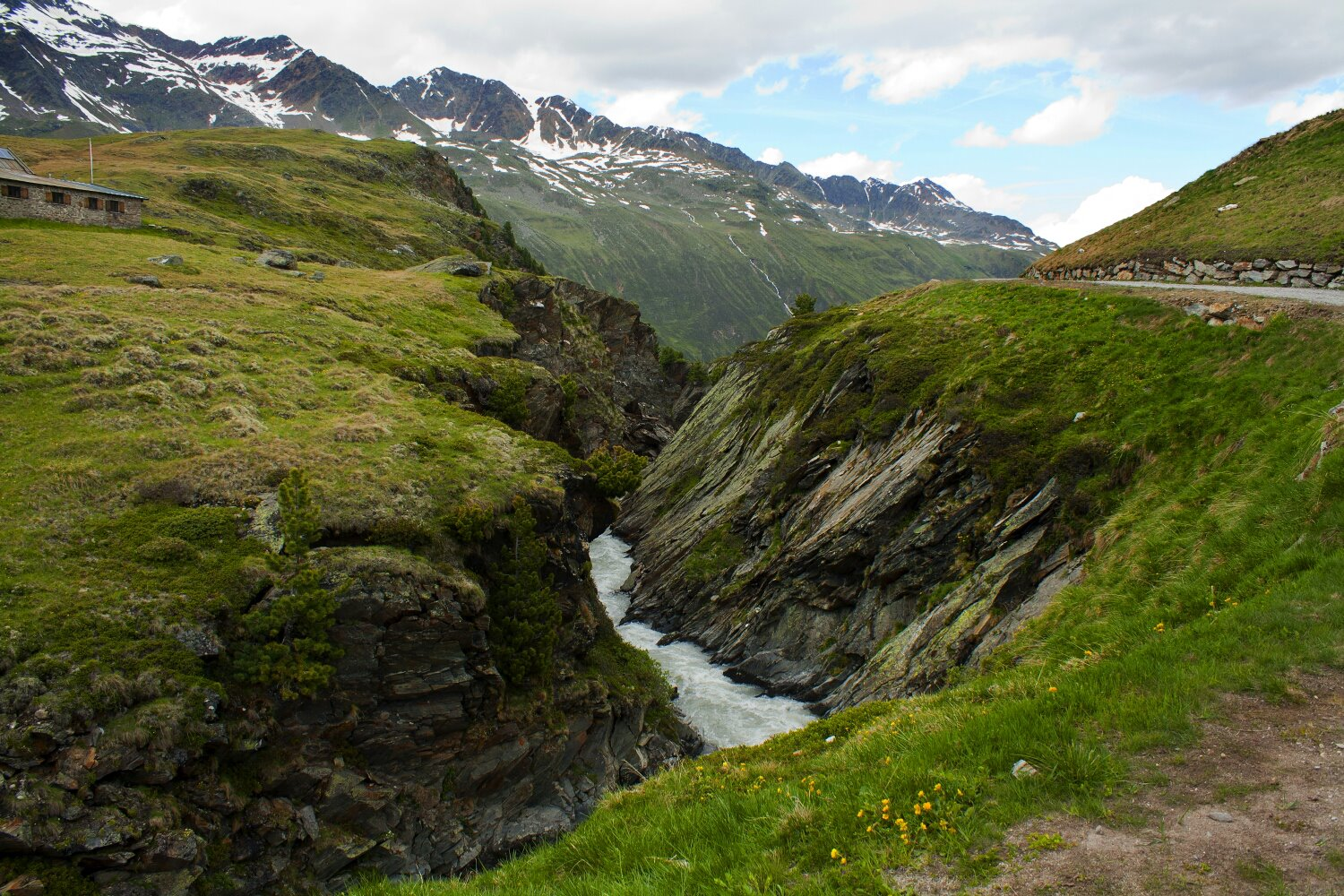
A creek near Obergurgl.
