= Ulrika Sjöwall =

Swedish archer (born 1971)

Medal record

Women's archery

Representing Sweden

World Championships
Gold medal – first place	2001 Beijing	Individual
Silver medal – second place	1995 Jakarta	Team

World Indoor Championships
Silver medal – second place	1995 Birmingham	Team
Bronze medal – third place	1997 Istanbul	Team

Ulrika Sjöwall (born 17 August 1971) is a Swedish athlete who competes in compound archery. She was the 2001 World Champion.

== Personal life ==
Her twin sister Jenny Sjöwall is also an archer, who has competed at the Olympic level.
