= Carita Jussila =

Finnish archer (1947–2011)

Carita Ann-Marie Jussila (20 August 1947 - 18 March 2011) was a Finnish language teacher and three time World Champion in archery.

== Archery ==
She competed in the women's individual event at the 1980 Summer Olympic Games and finished fourteenth with a score of 2298 points.

Jussila won the World Field Archery Championships and European title in the freestyle women's individual event in 1980, 1982 and 1986. A bronze medal was won in 1988.

== Life ==
Jussila graduated from the University of Helsinki with a Master's degree in Philosophy. She taught Russian and English at the Hyvinkää School of Business until her retirement. Jussila never married or had children.
