= Lisa Unruh =

German archer (born 1988)

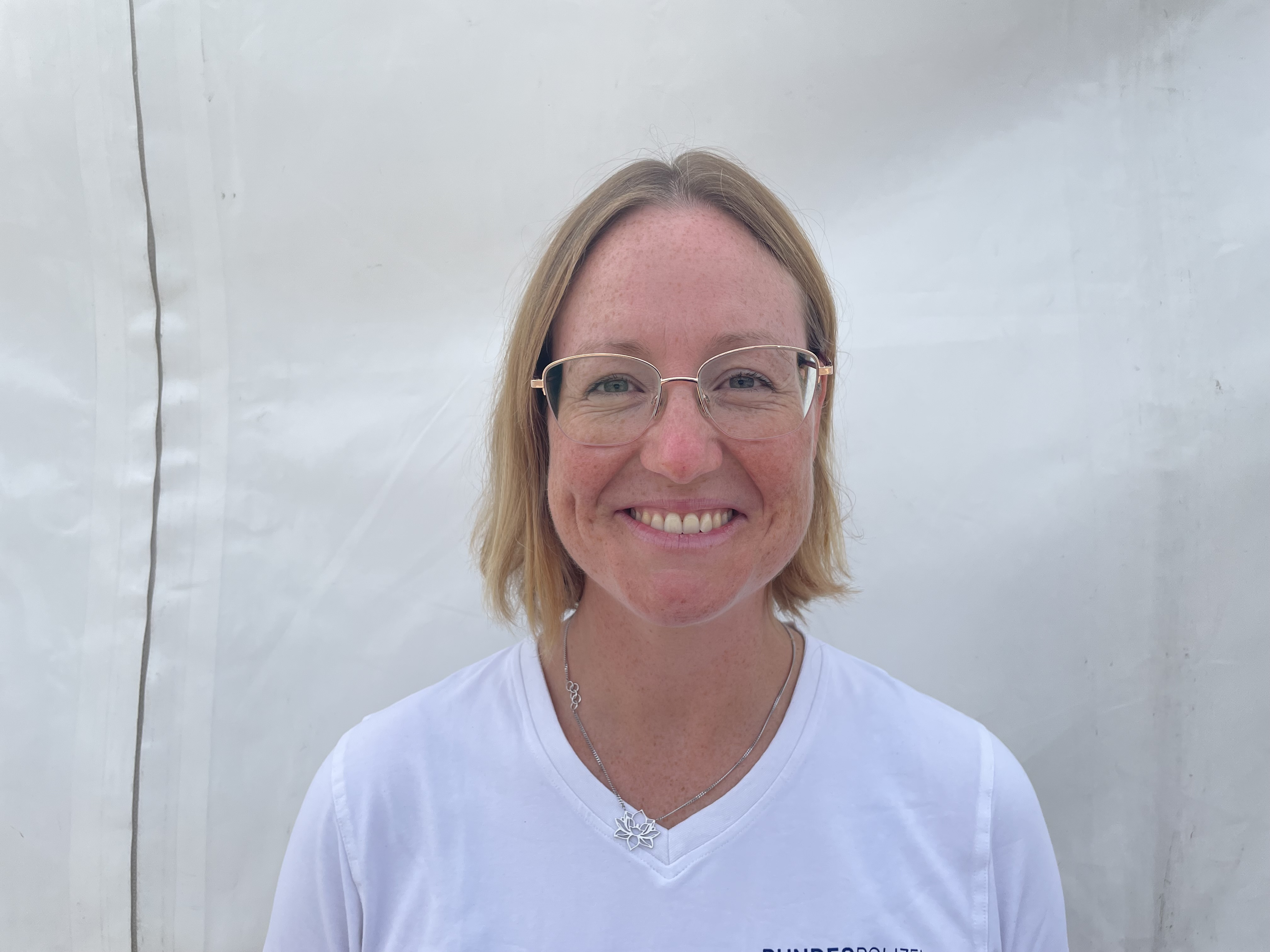
Medal record
Women's archery
Representing Germany
Olympic Games
Silver medal – second place	2016 Rio de Janeiro	Individual
Bronze medal – third place	2020 Tokyo	Team
European Archery Championships
Silver medal – second place	2008 Vittel	Team
Silver medal – second place	2021 Antalya	Team
Bronze medal – third place	2012 Amsterdam	Team
World Cup Final
Gold medal – first place	2021 Yankton	Individual
World Games
Gold medal – first place	2017 Wrocław	Field Individual
World Indoor Championships
Silver medal – second place	2007 İzmir	Team
World Field Championships
Gold medal – first place	2014 Zagreb	Individual
Silver medal – second place	2017 Mexico City	Mixed team
Indoor Archery World Cup
Bronze medal – third place	2012 Las Vegas	Individual

Lisa Unruh (born 12 April 1988) is a German athlete who competes in recurve archery.

Unruh represented Germany at the 2016 Summer Olympics in Rio de Janeiro winning the silver medal. Her silver medal was the first individual medal in archery her country has ever won at the Olympic Games.

She represented Germany at the 2020 Summer Olympics, winning a bronze medal in the team archery event.

== Career ==
Lisa Unruh started internationally in 2006, at the European Championships in 2006 she got the German team to fourth place. Unruh has won team medals at European and World Indoor Championships and World Cup stages, and an individual medal at the 2012 Indoor World Cup. In 2014, she qualified for the World Cup Final in Lausanne for the first time.

Unruh won the gold medal at the 2017 World Games in Wrocław, Poland.

== Personal life ==
Lisa Unruh is married to fellow archer Florian Unruh (né Kahllund).
