= Clint Freeman =

Australian archer (born 1973)

Medal record

Men's archery

Representing Australia

World Championships
Gold medal – first place	2003 New York	Individual
Silver medal – second place	2007 Leipzig	Team
Bronze medal – third place	2005 Madrid	Team
Bronze medal – third place	1995 Jakarta	Team

Clint Freeman (born 16 August 1973 in Launceston, Tasmania), is an athlete from Australia, who competes in compound archery. He was the 2003 world champion.
