= Jessica Tomasi =

Italian archer (born 1986)

Medal record

Women's recurve archery

Representing Italy

World Games
Silver medal – second place	2009 Kaohsiung	Recurve individual
Bronze medal – third place	2013 Cali	Individual
Bronze medal – third place	2017 Wrocław	Recurve individual

Jessica Tomasi (born 3 July 1986) is an Italian female archer. At the 2012 Summer Olympics she competed for her country in the Women's team event.
