= Sebastian Rohrberg =

German archer (born 1979)

Medal record

Men's archery

Representing Germany

World Field Archery Championships
Gold medal – first place	2004 Plitvice	Individual
Gold medal – first place	2008 Llwynypia	Individual

World Indoor Archery Championships
Gold medal – first place	2007 İzmir	Individual

European Archery Championships
Gold medal – first place	2010 Rovereto	Team
Silver medal – second place	2010 Rovereto	Mixed team

Sebastian Rohrberg (born 13 March 1979) is a German recurve archer. He has competed at the major World Archery Federation competitions, the World Cup and the World Archery Championships, winning gold medals at the indoor and field championships. The highest world ranking he has achieved is 31.
