= Catherine Pellen =

French archer (born 1956)

Personal information
- Born: 4 December 1956 (age 69) Paris, France
Medal record
Women's archery
Representing France
World Championships
Gold medal – first place	1999 Riom	Individual (compound)
Gold medal – first place	2001 Beijing	Team (compound)
Silver medal – second place	1997 Victoria	Individual (compound)
Bronze medal – third place	1997 Victoria	Team (compound)
World Indoor Championships
Gold medal – first place	1999 Havana	Team
Gold medal – first place	2001 Florence	Team
World Field Championships
Gold medal – first place	1998 Obergurgl	Individual
Gold medal – first place	2002 Canberra	Individual
Silver medal – second place	1988 Bolzano	Individual
Silver medal – second place	1988 Margraten	Individual

Cathérine Pellen (born 4 December 1956 in Paris) is a French athlete who competes in compound archery.

== Career ==
She represented France at the 1988 Summer Olympics, reaching the quarter final, before converting to the compound discipline. As a compound archer she became the 1999 World Champion, and also became World Champion in the indoor and field competitions.
