= Chris White (archer) =

British archer (born 1979)

Christopher White
Personal information
- Full name: Christopher White
- Born: 11 March 1979 (age 47)
Medal record
Men's compound archery
Representing United Kingdom
World Championships
Bronze medal – third place	1999 Riom	Team
World Field Championships
Silver medal – second place	2014 Zagreb	Individual

Christopher White (born 11 March 1979) is a British archer who won the 2002 IFAA & 2004 FITA World Field Championships as well as the 2009 compound event at the European Field Champions.

In 2010, he won the gold & silver medal in the team and individual compound archery event in the 2010 Commonwealth Games.
