= Göran Bjerendal =

Swedish archer (born 1951)

Personal information
- Nationality: Swedish
- Born: 21 October 1951 (age 75) Mölndal, Sweden

Sport
- Sport: Archery

Göran Bjerendal (born 21 October 1951) is a Swedish archer. He competed at the 1980, 1984, 1988 and the 1996 Summer Olympics.
