= Morgan Lundin =

Swedish archer (born 1969)

Medal record

Men's archery

Representing Sweden

World Championships
Gold medal – first place	2005 Madrid	Individual
Silver medal – second place	2001 Beijing	Individual

Morgan Lundin (born 20 May 1969) is a Swedish compound archer. He was the 2005 world champion and is a former world number one archer.
