= Deaths in May 2003 =

The following is a list of notable deaths in May 2003.

Entries for each day are listed alphabetically by surname. A typical entry lists information in the following sequence:

- Name, age, country of citizenship at birth, subsequent country of citizenship (if applicable), reason for notability, cause of death (if known), and reference.

== May 2003 ==
=== 1 ===
- Haukur Clausen, 74, Icelandic Olympic athlete (1948).
- István Kelen, 91, Hungarian-Australian sportsman, journalist, author, and playwright.
- Shlomo Levi, 68, Israeli football player.
- Miss Elizabeth, 42, American professional wrestler and wrestling manager, drug and alcohol overdose.
- Paul Moore Jr., 83, American bishop of the Episcopal Church and former US Marine Corps officer.
- Wim van Est, 80, Dutch racing cyclist.

=== 2 ===
- Mohammed Dib, 82, Algerian writer.
- Blaga Dimitrova, 81, Bulgarian poet and politician, Vice President (1992-1993), cerebrovascular disease.
- James Miller, 34, Welsh filmmaker and cameraman, killed by Israel Defense Forces (IDF).
- Henry Wise, Jr., 82, American physician and World War II Tuskegee Airman fighter pilot.
- George Wyle, 87, American musical director and composer (theme to Gilligan's Island, It's the Most Wonderful Time of the Year), leukemia.

=== 3 ===
- José Alanís, 92, Mexican Olympic sports shooter (1948).
- Velleda Cesari, 83, Italian fencer and Olympian (1948, 1952, 1956, 1960).
- Queta Claver, 70, Spanish actress, singer, and dancer, cardiovascular disease.
- Don Dorrell, 69, American actor.
- Glen Culler, 75, American professor of electrical engineering.
- Don Johnson, 62, American bowler, heart attack.
- Andy Martin, 75, British Olympic pentathlete (1948).
- Suzy Parker, 70, American actress and model, wife of Bradford Dillman, arthritis, diabetes.
- Marcel Roche, 82, French physician and scientist.
- G. Venkateswaran, 55, Indian film producer.

=== 4 ===
- Alexander Boghossian, 65, Ethiopian-American artist and teacher.
- Sesto Bruscantini, 83, Italian baritone.
- Toivo Oikarinen, 79, Finnish Olympic cross-country skier (1952).
- Arthur Oldham, 76, British composer and choirmaster.
- Jean Tricart, 82, French geomorphologist.
- Richard Trowbridge, 83, British admiral and Governor of Western Australia (1980–1983).
- Frank Wismayer, 90, Maltese Olympic water polo player (1936).
- David Woodley, 44, American gridiron football player (Miami Dolphins, Pittsburgh Steelers), complications due to kidney and liver failure.

=== 5 ===
- Sam Bockarie, 38, Sierra Leonean politician and army commander, shot.
- David Lewin, 69, American music theorist.
- Philip Powell, 82, British architect.
- Sultan Rakhmanov, 52, Soviet Ukrainian weightlifter and Olympic champion (1980), heart attack.
- Waly Salomão, 59, Brazilian poet.
- Walter Sisulu, 90, South African anti-apartheid activist and ANC member, Parkinson's disease.

=== 6 ===
- Steve Atkinson, 54, Canadian ice hockey player (Buffalo Sabres, Washington Capitals, Toronto Toros), heart attack.
- Geoffrey Bardon, 63, Australian artist, teacher and aboriginal art advocate.
- Oleksandr Bilash, 72, Ukrainian composer and author.
- Tito García, 71, Spanish actor.
- Colin Gunton, 62, British theologian and academic.
- Jocelyn Herbert, 86, British stage designer.
- Art Houtteman, 75, American baseball player (Detroit Tigers, Cleveland Indians, Baltimore Orioles), heart attack.
- Patrick Kiernan, 73, Irish Olympic equestrian (1956).
- Stanislav Kolář, 91, Czechoslovak and Czech table tennis player.
- Dean L. May, 65, American academic, author and documentary filmmaker, heart attack.

=== 7 ===
- Denise Albe-Fessard, 86, French neuroscientist.
- Duane Allen, 65, American football player (Los Angeles Rams, Pittsburgh Steelers, Chicago Bears).
- Johan Andersen, 83, Danish sprint canoer and Olympian (1948).
- Leroy Bass, 85, American baseball player.
- Sisir Kumar Das, 66, Linguist, poet, playwright, translator, comparatist and a scholar of Indian literature.
- Quentin Dean, 58, American actress, cancer.
- Mike Hudock, 68, American gridiron football player (New York Titans/Jets, Miami Dolphins, Kansas City Chiefs).
- Joshua Madaki, 55, Nigerian politician, car crash.
- George Morrow, 69, American computer scientist and pioneer, aplastic anemia.

=== 8 ===
- Slick Coffman, 92, American baseball player (Detroit Tigers, St. Louis Browns).
- Dorothy Ferguson, 80, Canadian-American baseball player, cancer.
- Sam Lacy, 99, American sportswriter, reporter, and television/radio commentator.
- Elvira Pagá, 82, Brazilian vedette, actress, singer, writer and painter.

=== 9 ===
- Yves Brouzet, 54, French shot putter (four-time French champion), and Olympian (1972, 1976).
- Hans Engnestangen, 95, Norwegian Olympic speed skater (1932, 1936), and world champion.
- Carmen Filpi, 80, American actor (Pee-wee's Big Adventure, The Beverly Hillbillies, Halloween 4: The Return of Michael Myers), cancer.
- Antonio Ibáñez Freire, 89, Spanish politician and army officer.
- Jack Gelber, 71, American playwright (The Connection), leukemia.
- Russell B. Long, 84, American politician (U.S. Senator from Louisiana from 1948 to 1987), heart attack.
- Alexey Medvedev, 75, Soviet-Russian heavyweight weightlifter.
- Elizabeth Neuffer, 46, American journalist, specialized in war crimes and human rights abuses, car accident in Iraq.
- Bernard Spear, 83, English actor.

=== 10 ===
- Ingo Buding, 61, West German tennis player.
- Oleg Galkin, 38, Ukrainian cyclist and Olympian (1992).
- Bob Gaudio, 77, American football player (Ohio State Buckeyes, Cleveland Browns).
- Leonard Michaels, 70, American writer of short stories, novels, and essays.
- Eleanor C. Pressly, 85, American mathematician and aeronautical engineer at NASA.
- Ambros Speiser, 80, Swiss engineer and scientist.
- Milan Vukcevich, 66, Yugoslav-born American chemist and Grandmaster of Chess Composition.
- Luther Vye, 79, British field hockey player and Olympian (1956).
- Joseph D. Ward, 89, American politician.

=== 11 ===
- Karl Boyes, 67, American politician (Pennsylvania House of Representatives).
- Bill Kellagher, 82, American football player (Chicago Rockets).
- Noel Redding, 57, English former bassist for The Jimi Hendrix Experience, liver cirrhosis.
- John H. Rousselot, 75, American politician (U.S. Representative from California).
- Ernie Toshack, 88, Australian cricketer.

=== 12 ===
- Jim Clunie, 69, Scottish football player and manager.
- Prince Sadruddin Aga Khan, 70, French civil servant (U.N. High Commissioner for Refugees 1965–1977), cancer.
- Stan Lay, 96, New Zealand javelin thrower and Olympian (1928).
- Willie Ludick, 62, South African Olympic boxer (1960).
- Renate Riemeck, 82, German historian and Christian peace activist.
- Jeremy Sandford, 72, British screenwriter.

=== 13 ===
- Theo Aronson, 73, South African-British royal biographer (Princess Alice, Queen Mother, Princess Margaret), cancer.
- John Savage, 70, Canadian politician, former Premier of Nova Scotia, cancer.
- Einar Sundström, 83, Finnish Olympic weightlifter (1948).
- René Voillaume, 97, French Catholic priest and theologian.
- Byron Wolford, 72, American rodeo cowboy and professional poker player.
- Marcos Zucker, 82, Argentine actor and comedian.

=== 14 ===
- Tranquilo Cappozzo, 85, Argentine rower and Olympic champion (1948, 1952).
- Dave DeBusschere, 62, American basketball player (Detroit Pistons, New York Knicks), and coach (Detroit Pistons), heart attack.
- Otto Edelmann, 86, Austrian operatic bass.
- Al Fleming, 49, American basketball player (Seattle SuperSonics), cancer.
- Ebbe Gyllenstierna, 91, Swedish army officer and Olympic modern pentathlete (1936).
- Ingvar Helle, 70, Norwegian politician.
- Dame Wendy Hiller, 91, English actress (Separate Tables, Pygmalion, A Man for All Seasons), Oscar winner (1959).
- Pepper LaBeija, 54, American drag queen and fashion designer, heart attack.
- Henri Marracq, 65, French rugby player.
- Minarni, 59, Indonesian badminton player.
- Gennadiy Nikonov, 52, Russian firearm engineer.
- Dante Quinterno, 93, Argentine businessman and comics artist.
- Paul Rothley, 77, French Olympic rower (1948).
- Gordon Salkilld, 76, English actor.
- Robert Stack, 84, American actor (The Untouchables, Written on the Wind) and television host (Unsolved Mysteries), Emmy winner (1960), heart attack.

=== 15 ===
- June Carter Cash, 73, American musician and wife of Johnny Cash, complications following surgery.
- Pedro Chappé, 57, Cuban basketball player and Olympian (1972).
- Desmond Dreyer, 93, British Royal Navy admiral.
- Constantin Dăscălescu, 79, Romanian communist politician.
- Stanley B. Kimball, 76, American historian, cancer.
- Gaby Robert, 83, French footballer, coach, and Olympian (1948).
- Hayseed Stephens, 64, American football player (New York Titans).
- Rik Van Steenbergen, 78, Belgian cyclist.
- Rune Waldekranz, 91, Swedish film producer.

=== 16 ===
- William Charles Anderson, 83, American writer and screen writer (Bat*21).
- Mark McCormack, 72, American lawyer, sports agent and writer.
- Stan Rofe, 69, Australian disc jockey and music news reporter, cancer.
- Boris Stavrev, 68, Bulgarian Olympic fencer (1960, 1972).
- Lazar Tasić, 72, Serbian football player.
- Bogdan Śliwa, 81, Polish chess master.

=== 17 ===
- Edith Carlmar, 91, Norwegian actress and Norway's first female film director.
- Pop Ivy, 87, American football player and coach.
- Lilli Lentz, 78, Danish Olympic archer (1972).
- Edwin L. Nelson, 63, American district judge (United States District Court for the Northern District of Alabama).
- Irene Gut Opdyke, 81, Polish nurse, kidney failure, liver failure.
- Luigi Pintor, 77, Italian politician and journalist.
- Gerhard Schöpfel, 90, German Luftwaffe flying ace during World War II.
- Joe Spencer, 83, American baseball player.

=== 18 ===
- Marilyn Bendell, 81, American impressionist painter.
- Peter Lasko, 79, German-British art historian.
- Nick Roman, 55, American gridiron football player (Ohio State Buckeyes, Cincinnati Bengals, Cleveland Browns), heart attack.
- Mentz Schulerud, 87, Norwegian author, radio personality and theatre director.
- Waldemar Woźniak, 48, Polish Olympic gymnast (1980).

=== 19 ===
- Camoflauge, 21, American rapper.
- Johanna Budwig, 94, German biochemist, alternative cancer treatment advocate and author.
- Kunhiraman Palat Candeth, 86, Indian Army general.
- Paul Hagen, 83, Danish film and television actor.
- Ludwig Lachner, German footballer and manager.
- Aleksandr Miroshnichenko, 39, Kazakhstani boxer and Olympic medalist (1988), fall.
- Helio Vieira, 88, Brazilian Olympic fencer (1952).
- Ivo Žídek, 76, Czech operatic tenor, known for his roles in the operas of Smetana, Dvořák and Janáček.

=== 20 ===
- Jim Clough, 86, Australian politician.
- Zbigniew Gawior, 56, Polish luger and Olympian (1968).
- Walter Höllerer, 80, German writer, literary critic, and literature academic.
- Eddie Little, 48, American author and journalist, heart attack.
- Howard Sims, 86, African-American vaudeville tap dancer, Alzheimer's disease.

=== 21 ===
- Alejandro de Tomaso, 74, Argentine racing driver and industrialist.
- Yaroslav Golovanov, 70, Russian journalist, writer and science communicator, cerebrovascular disease.
- Dietrich Grunewald, 86, Swedish-born American artist.
- Hermann A. Haus, 77, Slovene-American scientist.
- Roy Keenan, 72, Canadian Olympic boxer (1952).
- Sumitra Mukherjee, 54, Indian Bengali actress.
- Felice Orlandi, 77, Italian-American actor.
- Alexander Slatnow, 52, German canoeist and Olympian (1972).
- Frank D. White, 69, American politician (41st governor of Arkansas), banker and banking regulator, heart attack.

=== 22 ===
- Packiam Arokiaswamy, 82, Indian Roman Catholic prelate.
- Alec Burns, 95, British track and field athlete and Olympian (1932, 1936).
- Big DS, 31, American hardcore rapper and record producer, lymphatic cancer.
- Grover E. Murray, 86, American geologist and educator.
- Noel Robins, 67, Australian partially quadriplegic sailor, traffic accident.

=== 23 ===
- Aleksandr Asanov, 49, Kazakhstani Olympic sports shooter (1980, 1992).
- Fred W. Berger, 94, American film editor.
- Jorge Cruz, 76, Brazilian Olympic water polo player (1960).
- Erwin Huber, 96, German Olympic decathlete (1928, 1936).
- Allan McMahon, 48, Australian rugby league footballer and coach.
- Ray Parry, 67, English football player.
- Michael Pössinger, 84, German bobsledder and Olympian (1956).
- Peter Prahm, 94, Danish Olympic field hockey player (1928).
- Carlos Sambuceti, 80, Argentine Olympic rower (1948).
- Jean Yanne, 69, French actor and director (Weekend, This Man Must Die), heart attack.

=== 24 ===
- François Boyer, 83, French screenwriter.
- Neil Cherry, 56, New Zealand environmental scientist, ALS.
- Don Hanmer, 83, American film actor.
- Rachel Kempson, 92, English actress, stroke.
- Jules Levy, 80, American television and film producer.
- Allan McMahon, 48, Australian rugby footballer and coach, heart attack.
- Arne Skouen, 89, Norwegian journalist, author and film director.

=== 25 ===
- Almir Chediak, 52, Brazilian musician and entrepreneur, shot.
- Richard Gardner, 72, American child psychiatrist, suicide by stabbing.
- David Hafler, 84, American audio engineer, Parkinson's disease.
- George Edward Lynch, 86, American Roman Catholic prelate, Auxiliary Bishop of Raleigh.
- Bill Paschal, 81, American football player (Georgia Tech, New York Giants, Boston Yanks).
- Jorma Rinne, 67, Finnish Olympic discus thrower (1972).
- Laurette Séjourné, 91, Mexican archeologist and ethnologist.
- Jeremy Ward, 27, American keyboardist and sound technician, heroin overdose.
- Sloan Wilson, 83, American novelist (The Man in the Gray Flannel Suit, A Summer Place), Alzheimer's disease.

=== 26 ===
- Charles Brahm, 85, Belgian Olympic canoeist (1936).
- Alfredo Bravo, 78, Argentine politician and trade unionist, heart attack.
- Melitta Brunner, 96, Austrian figure skater and Olympian (1928).
- Bob Dawes, 78, Canadian ice hockey player (Toronto Maple Leafs, Montreal Canadiens).
- Burr DeBenning, 66, American actor.
- Gerald Hawkins, 75, British-American astronomer and author, heart attack.
- Thomas Risley Odhiambo, 72, Kenyan entomologist and environmental activist.
- Jim Root, 71, American football player (Miami University, Chicago Cardinals) and coach (New Hampshire, William & Mary).
- Kathleen Winsor, 83, American author (Forever Amber).

=== 27 ===
- Geoffrey Bawa, 83, Sri Lankan architect.
- Luciano Berio, 77, Italian composer (Sinfonia).
- François Bondy, 88, Swiss journalist and novelist.
- Verdi Boyer, 91, American football player (Brooklyn Dodgers).
- Mac Colville, 87, Canadian ice hockey player (New York Rangers).
- Kalim Khawaja Ghani, 71-72, Pakistani Olympic hurdler (1956).
- Al Hartley, 81, American comic book writer and -artist.
- Stellan Nilsson, 81, Swedish football player and Olympian (1948).

=== 28 ===
- Janet Collins, 86, American ballerina.
- Jeffrey P. Hillelson, 84, American politician, member of the United States House of Representatives (1953-1955).
- Phil Holloway, 86, New Zealand politician.
- Oleg Grigoryevich Makarov, 70, Soviet cosmonaut and rocket scientist (Soyuz 12, Soyuz 27, Soyuz 26, Soyuz T-3), heart attack.
- Dorothy Nelkin, 69, American sociologist of science and author.
- James Plunkett, 83, Irish writer.
- Ilya Prigogine, 86, Russian-Belgian physical chemist, 1977 Nobel Prize winner in chemistry.
- Martha Scott, 90, American actress.
- Momir Talić, 60, Bosnian Serb general in the Yugoslav People's Army and the VRS.
- Marc Zuber, 59, English actor, heart attack.

=== 29 ===
- W. R. Alford, 65, American mathematician, worked in the field of number theory, brain cancer.
- Savita Ambedkar, 94, Indian social activist and doctor.
- Trevor Ford, 79, Welsh international footballer, pneumonia.
- Anthony Frederick, 38, American basketball player (Indiana Pacers, Sacramento Kings, Charlotte Hornets), heart attack.
- David Jefferies, 30, British motorcycle racer, motorcycle crash.
- Mickey Kobrosky, 88, American football player (New York Giants).
- Basil Langton, 91, English actor, director and photographer.
- Joanna Paul, 57, New Zealand visual artist, poet and film maker.
- Pierre Restany, 72, French art critic and cultural philosopher.
- Wallace Terry, 65, American journalist and oral historian.

=== 30 ===
- Zagir Ismagilov, 86, Soviet Bashkir composer and pedagogue.
- Mario Mattioli, 58, Italian volleyball player and Olympian (1976).
- Minoru Mochizuki, 96, Japanese martial artist.
- Mickie Most, 64, English record producer, peritoneal mesothelioma.
- Günter Pfitzmann, 79, German film actor, heart attack.
- Lars T. Platou, 82, Norwegian politician.
- John Morris Roberts, 75, British historian and broadcaster.
- Silvester Sabolčki, 23, Croatian footballer, car crash.
- Jason Sweeney, 16, American construction worker, beaten.
- Jay Waldman, 58, American district judge (United States District Court for the Eastern District of Pennsylvania).

=== 31 ===
- Nicolas Barone, 72, French road bicycle racer.
- Janine Bazin, 80, French film and television producer.
- Anil Biswas, 88, Indian film music director.
- Francesco Colasuonno, 78, Italian prelate of the Catholic Church.
- Hal Haskins, 78, American basketball player and coach.
- Anthony Stodart, Baron Stodart of Leaston, 86, Scottish politician and life peer.
- Li Lin, 79, Chinese physicist.
- Billy Wade, 88, South African cricketer.
