= Akiyama (disambiguation) =

Akiyama is a Japanese surname.

Akiyama may also refer to:

- Akiyama, Yamanashi, Japan
- Akiyama clan, Japanese clan mainly originating during the Sengoku Period of the 16th century
- 2153 Akiyama, asteroid
- Akiyama Jin Kyouju Kanshuu: Zennou JinJin, Nintendo DS brain training game
- "Autumn Mountain", a.k.a. "Akiyama", a short story by Ryūnosuke Akutagawa
