= Akiyama =

Akiyama (written: 秋山/穐山, lit. 'Autumn mountain') is a Japanese surname. Notable people with the surname include:

- Akiyama Yoshifuru (秋山 好古; 1859 – 1930), general in the Imperial Japanese Army and considered father of the Japanese Cavalry
- Denis Akiyama (1952–2018), Japanese-Canadian actor and voice actor
- Iwao Akiyama (秋山 巌; 1921–2014), Japanese printmaker
- Jiro Akiyama (秋山 次郎; born 1977), Japanese professional Go player
- Jin Akiyama (秋山 仁; born 1946), Japanese mathematician
- Jun Akiyama (秋山 準; born 1969), Japanese professional wrestler
- Kazuhiko Akiyama (秋山 和彦; born 1973), Japanese massage therapist, former crab fisherman, best known for being the first grand champion (1999) of the TV series Sasuke
- Kazuyoshi Akiyama (秋山 和慶; 1941–2025), Japanese conductor
- Koji Akiyama (秋山 幸二; born 1962), Japanese baseball manager, former player
- Makio Akiyama (秋山 万喜夫; born 1950), Japanese astronomer
- Miyuki Akiyama (秋山 美幸; born 1984), Japanese volleyball player
- Mizuhito Akiyama (秋山 瑞人; born 1971), Japanese writer
- Monzo Akiyama (秋山 門造; 1891–1944), Imperial Japanese Navy admiral
- Akiyama Nobutomo (秋山 信友; 1531–1575), Japanese samurai
- Rina Akiyama (秋山 莉奈; born 1985), Japanese actress, gravure idol and television personality
- Rina Akiyama (swimmer) (秋山 里奈), Japanese Paralympic swimmer
- Runa Akiyama (あきやま るな; 1954–2014), Japanese voice actress
- Ryōji Akiyama (秋山 亮二; born 1942), Japanese photographer
- Satoko Akiyama (秋山 紗登子), Japanese female pop artist
- Saneyuki Akiyama (秋山 真之; 1868–1918), admiral of the Japanese Navy in the Russo-Japanese War, younger brother of Yoshifuru
- Shogo Akiyama (秋山 翔吾; born 1988), Japanese professional baseball player
- Shōtarō Akiyama (秋山 庄太郎; 1920 – 2003), Japanese photographer
- Shun Akiyama (秋山 駿; 1930–2013), Japanese literary critic
- Tadashima Akiyama, 16th-century samurai known for being defeated by Miyamoto Musashi
- Tadasuke Akiyama (秋山 忠右; born 1941), Japanese photographer
- Takumi Akiyama (秋山 拓巳; born 1991), Japanese baseball pitcher
- Tamayo Akiyama (秋山 たまよ; born 1966), Japanese shōjo manga author and artist
- Teruo Akiyama (秋山 輝男; 1891–1943), admiral of the Japanese Navy in World War II
- Teruyoshi Akiyama (秋山 輝吉; born 1971), Japanese sport shooter
- Tetuzi Akiyama, Japanese guitarist, violinist, and instrument-maker
- Tokuzō Akiyama (秋山 徳蔵; 1888–1974), Japanese chef
- Toyohiro Akiyama (秋山 豊寛; born 1942), Japanese television journalist and cosmonaut
- Yasunari Akiyama (秋山 安成; born 1948), Japanese sport wrestler
- Yoshihiro Akiyama (秋山 成勲; born 1975), judoka and mixed martial artist who has fought representing both South Korea and Japan
- Yoshiko Akiyama (秋山 芳子; born 1949), Japanese archer
- Yūtokutaishi Akiyama (秋山 祐徳太子; 1935–2020), Japanese engraving artist
- Yuzuki Akiyama (秋山 ゆずき; born 1993), Japanese actress

== Fictional characters ==
- Mio Akiyama (秋山 澪), a character in the manga series K-On!
- Mizuki Akiyama (暁山 瑞希), a character in the video game Hatsune Miku: Colorful Stage!
- Ren Akiyama (秋山 蓮), a character in the television series Kamen Rider Ryuki
- Ryo Akiyama (秋山 遼), a character in the anime series Digimon Tamers
- Shinichi Akiyama (秋山 深一), a character in the manga series Liar Game
- Jan Akiyama|秋山 醤, lead character from the manga series Iron Wok Jan
- Kaiichiro Akiyama (秋山 階一郎) and Baku Akiyama (秋山 爆), family members of the lead character from Iron Wok Jan
- Yukari Akiyama (秋山 優花里), a character in the anime series Girls und Panzer
- Shun Akiyama (秋山 駿), a character in the Yakuza (series)

== See also ==
- Akiyama clan, a Japanese clan mainly originating during the Sengoku Period of the 16th century
