= Hamvas =

Hamvas is a surname. Notable people with the surname include:

- Ágnes Hamvas (born 1946), Hungarian archer
- Béla Hamvas (1897–1968), Hungarian writer, philosopher, and social critic
