= Shue =

Shue is a surname. It may be an Americanized spelling of the German surnames Schue or Schuh. Additionally, it is an ad hoc romanization of various Chinese surnames, including those spelled in pinyin as Xǔ (許) and Xuē (薛).

The 2010 United States census found 3,155 people with the surname Shue, making it the 10,215th-most-common name in the country, up from 3,091 (9,648th-most-common) in the 2000 United States census. In both censuses, slightly less than nine-tenths of the bearers of the surname identified as non-Hispanic white, and slightly less than one-tenth as Asian.

People with this surname include:

- Andrew Shue (born 1967), American actor
- Elisabeth Shue (born 1963), American actress; sister of Andrew
- Gene Shue (1931–2022), American basketball player and coach
- Henry Shue (born 1940), American philosopher
- Larry Shue (1946–1985), American playwright and actor
- Shue Meei-Shya (薛美霞; born 1949), Taiwanese archer
- Shue Ming-fa (許明發; born 1950), Taiwanese cyclist
- Shue Ming-shu (許明世; 1940–2000), Taiwanese cyclist
- Vivienne Shue (許慧文; born 1944), American sinologist

== See also ==
- Scheu, surname
