= Archery at the 1972 Summer Olympics – Women's individual =

Archery at the Olympics

Women's individual at the Games of the XX Olympiad
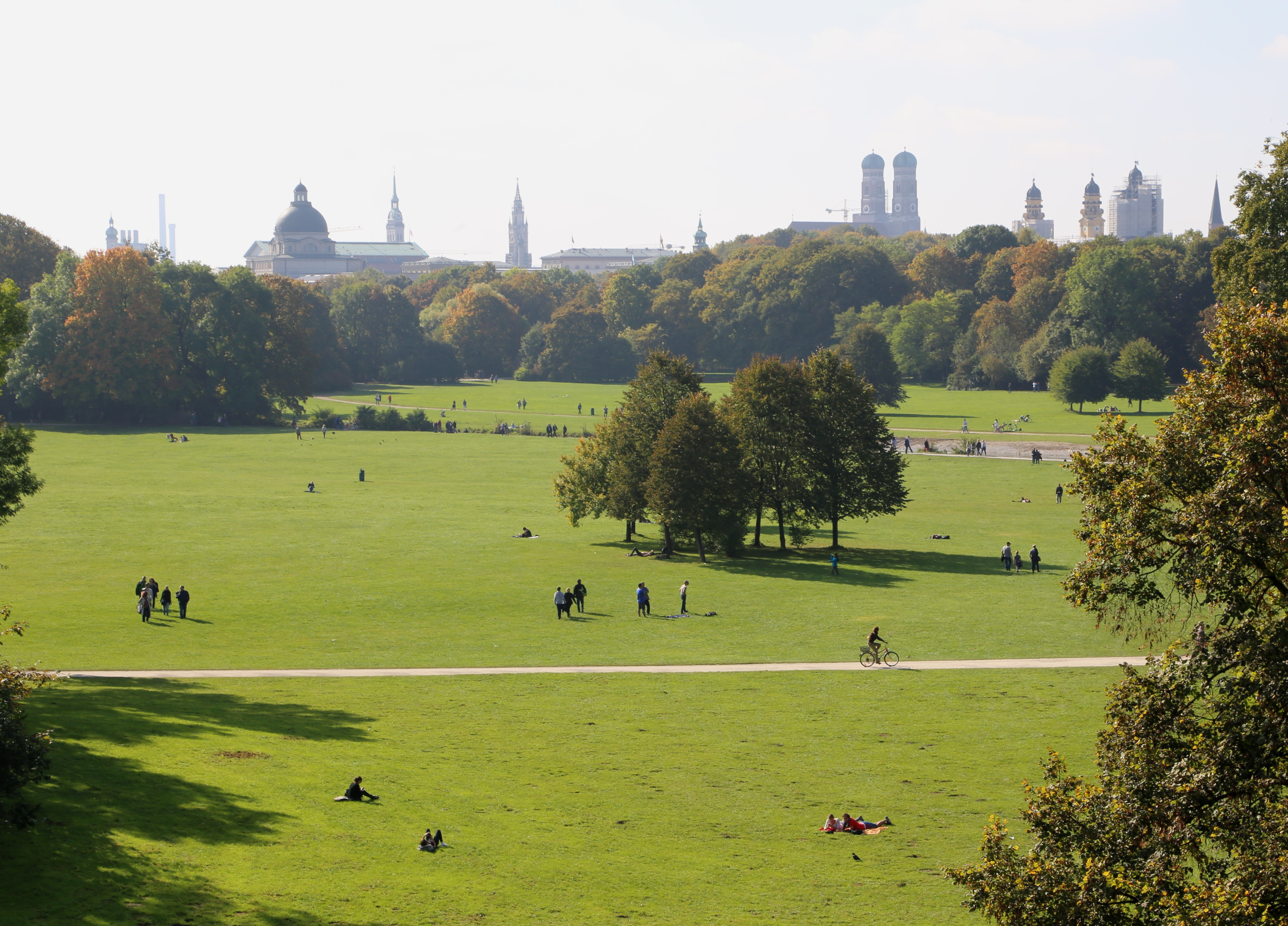
- Modern photograph of Englischer Garten, where the event took place
- Venue: Englischer Garten
- Dates: 7–10 September 1972
- Competitors: 40 from 21 nations
- Winning score: 2424

Medalists
1st place, gold medalist(s)		Doreen Wilber	United States
2nd place, silver medalist(s)		Irena Szydłowska	Poland
3rd place, bronze medalist(s)		Emma Gapchenko	Soviet Union

The women's individual archery event at the 1972 Summer Olympics was part of the archery programme. The event consisted of a double FITA round. For each round, the archer shot 36 arrows at each of four distances—70, 60, 50, and 30 metres. The highest score for each arrow was 10 points, giving a possible maximum of 2880 points.

== Records ==
The following new Olympic records were set during this competition.

Record	Round	Name	Nationality	Score	OR
Single FITA round	First	Irena Szydłowska	Poland	1224	OR
Single FITA round	Second	Doreen Wilber	United States	1226	OR
Double FITA round	Combined	Doreen Wilber	United States	2424	OR

== Results ==
Rank	Archer	Nation	Round 1 Score	Round 1 Rank	Round 2 Score	Round 2 Rank	Total Score
1st place, gold medalist(s)	Doreen Wilber	United States	1198	4	1226 (OR)	1	2424 (OR)
2nd place, silver medalist(s)	Irena Szydłowska	Poland	1224 (OR)	1	1183	9	2407
3rd place, bronze medalist(s)	Emma Gapchenko	Soviet Union	1201	2	1202	3	2403
4	Keto Losaberidze	Soviet Union	1195	6	1207	2	2402
5	Linda Myers	United States	1200	3	1185	6	2385
6	Maria Mączyńska	Poland	1173	12	1198	5	2371
7	Kim Ho-Gyu	North Korea	1195	6	1174	11	2369
8	Alla Peunova	Soviet Union	1180	10	1184	7	2364
9	Terene Donovan	Australia	1189	8	1167	13	2356
10	Francisca de Gutierrez	Mexico	1198	4	1155	16	2353
11	Mary Grant	Canada	1148	21	1202	3	2350
12	Ju Chun-Sam	North Korea	1179	11	1170	12	2349
13	Maria Teresa Romero	Spain	1169	13	1178	10	2347
14	Natjav Dariimaa	Mongolia	1189	8	1152	17	2341
15	Aurora Breton	Mexico	1151	19	1184	7	2335
16	Lynne Evans	Great Britain	1156	18	1157	15	2313
17	Yoshiko Akiyama	Japan	1162	15	1139	20	2301
18	Jadwiga Szoszler-Wilejto	Poland	1165	14	1132	22	2297
19	Maj-Britt Johansson	Sweden	1157	16	1126	23	2283
20	Kim Hyang-Min	North Korea	1157	16	1118	25	2275
21	Carol Sykes	Great Britain	1115	26	1158	14	2273
22	Agnes Hamvas	Hungary	1151	19	1114	27	2265
23	Silvia de Tapia	Mexico	1145	22	1113	28	2258
24	Nelly Wies-Weyrich	Luxembourg	1144	23	1108	33	2252
25	Pauline Edwards	Great Britain	1106	29	1143	18	2249
26	Erna Rahbek Pedersen	Denmark	1111	27	1133	21	2244
27	Herrad Frey	France	1121	24	1109	30	2230
28	Maureen Bechdolt	United States	1106	29	1112	29	2218
29	Lilli Lentz	Denmark	1109	28	1109	30	2218
30	Ursula Büschking	West Germany	1078	32	1122	24	2200
31	Pierrette Dame	France	1056	35	1140	19	2196
32	Marjory Saunders	Canada	1083	31	1109	30	2192
33	Sally Svendelin	Switzerland	1119	25	1072	37	2191
34	Anna-Lisa Berglund	Sweden	1070	34	1115	26	2185
35	Carla Nolpa	West Germany	1074	33	1091	35	2165
36	Doljin Demberel	Mongolia	1040	36	1102	34	2152
37	Tjoeij Lin Alienilin	Indonesia	1012	38	1088	36	2100
38	Shue Meei-Shya	Republic of China	1038	37	988	38	2026
39	Viola Muir	Canada	981	40	974	39	1955
40	Brit Stav	Norway	1003	39	926	40	1929
