= Tjoeij Lin Alienilin =

Indonesian archer (born 1943)

Tjoeij Lin Alienilin (born 25 August 1943) is an Indonesian archer who competed in the 1972 Summer Olympic Games in archery.

== Olympics ==
Alienilin finished 37th in the women's individual event with a score of 2100 points.
