= Sally Svendelin =

Swiss archer (born 1939)

Sally Svendelin (19 November 1939 – 29 April 2020) was an archer who represented Switzerland at the 1972 Summer Olympic Games in archery. Svendelin competed in the women's individual event and finished 33rd with a score of 2191 points.
