= Erna Rahbek Pedersen =

Danish archer (1926–2002)

Erna Rahbek Pedersen (6 October 1926 – 2002) was a Danish archer who represented Denmark at the 1972 Summer Olympic Games in archery.

== Career ==
She finished 26th in the women's individual event with a score of 2244 points.
