= Kim Ho-gyu =

North Korean archer

Kim Ho-Gyu (born 14 November 1950) represented North Korea in archery at the 1972 Summer Olympic Games.

== Olympics ==
She scored 2369 points in the women's individual event and finished 7th.
