= Carla Nolpa =

German archer (1946–2021)

Carla Nolpa (10 March 1946 – 29 June 2021) was an archer who represented West Germany at the 1972 Summer Olympic Games.

== Life ==
Nolpa was born on 10 March 1946 in Stod.

Nolpa scored 2165 points and finished 35th in the women's individual event.

She married Udo and was one of the early members of the 1. Bogen-Sport-Club Recklinghausen.

She died on 29 June 2021 in Recklinghausen.
