= Ursula Büschking =

West German archer (born 1941)

Ursula Büschking (born 23 September 1941) represented West Germany at the 1972 Summer Olympic Games in archery.

== Career ==
She competed in the 1972 Summer Olympic Games in the women's individual event and finished 30th with a score of 2200 points.
