= Scheu =

Scheu is a German surname. Notable people with the name include:

- Andreas Scheu (1844–1927), Austrian politician
- Elizabeth Scheu or Elizabeth Close (1912–2011), American architect
- Franz Scheu, Austrian footballer
- Georg Scheu (1879–1949), German botanist, plant physiologist, oenologist and grape breeder
- Gerhard Scheu (1943–2025), German politician
- Robin Scheu (footballer) (born 1995), German footballer
- Robin Scheu (politician), American female politician
- Solomon Scheu (1822–1888), German-American businessman and politician

== See also ==
- Shue, surname
- Scheuer, surname
