= Ju Chun-sam =

North Korean archer

Ju Chun-Sam (Korean: 주춘삼, born 3 August 1950) is a North Korean former archer who represented North Korea in archery at the 1972 Summer Olympic Games.

== Olympics ==
She competed in the women's individual event and finished twelfth with a score of 2349 points.
