= Mary Grant (archer) =

Canadian archer (born 1949)

Mary Grant (born 27 February 1949) is a former archer who represented Canada at the 1972 Summer Olympic Games in archery.

== Olympics ==
At the 1972 Summer Olympic Games she competed in the women's individual event and finished eleventh with a total of 2350 points.
