= Pierrette Dame =

French archer (born 1936)

Pierrette Dame (born 26 August 1936) is a French archer who represented France at the 1972 Summer Olympic Games in archery.

== Career ==
She competed in the 1972 Summer Olympic Games in the women's individual event and finished 31st with a score of 2196 points.
