= Carol Sykes =

British archer (born 1941)

Carol Sykes (born 11 December 1941) is a British archer who represented Great Britain in archery at the 1972 Summer Olympic Games.

== Career ==
Sykes finished 21st in the women's individual event with a score of 2273 points.

She won the British National Indoor Championships ladies' recurve four times.
