= Doljin Demberel =

Mongolian archer (1938–1991)

Personal information
- Nationality: Mongolian
- Born: 19 May 1938 Bayan-Önjüül, Töv Province, Mongolia
- Died: 1991 (aged 52–53)
Medal record
Archery
Representing Mongolia
World Championships
Gold medal – first place	1971 York	30 m

Doljin Demberel (19 May 1938 – 1991) was a Mongolian archer who competed in the 1972 Summer Olympic Games in archery. Demberel held a winner title at the 1971 World Championships in Knavesmire, York, United Kingdom, accumulating a score of 641 point at women's archery 30 metres, which was the best result at this distance. Demberel was the first Mongolian ever to win a gold medal at the World Championships regardless of gender and age.

Modern archery in Mongolia has been developed with the support of Czech specialists. The country has sent an archery trainer Antonín Šimek in 1960, who trained the first Mongolians to complete in international competitions and in 1961 also brought the first internationally certified equipment to Ulaanbaatar from Europe. This effort later led also to the first ever world gold medal for Doljin Demberel.

== Olympics ==
Demberel finished 36th in the women's individual event with a score of 2152 points.
