= Herrad Frey =

French archer (1933–2022)

Herrad Frey (25 August 1933 – 19 November 2022) was a French former archer who represented France at the 1972 Summer Olympic Games in archery.

== Career ==
Frey finished 27th in the women's individual event with a score of 2230 points.
