= Silvia de Tapia =

Mexican archer (born 1940)

Silvia de Tapia (born 5 January 1940) is a Mexican archer who represented Mexico at the 1972 Summer Olympic Games in archery.

== Olympics ==
She finished 23rd in the women's individual event with a score of 2258 points.
