= Alla Peunova =

Soviet archer (born 1946)

Alla Peunova (3 August 1946 – 8 August 1986) represented the Soviet Union in archery at the 1972 Summer Olympic Games.She was born in Donetsk.

== Olympics ==
Peunova competed in the women's individual event and finished eighth with a score of 2364 points.
