= Lilli Lentz =

Danish archer (1924–2003)

Lilli Margrethe Lentz (13 September 1924 – 17 May 2003) was a Danish archer. She represented Denmark at the 1972 Summer Olympic Games in archery.

== Biography ==
Lentz competed in the 1972 Summer Olympic Games in the women's individual event and finished 29th with a score of 2218 points. She died on 17 May 2003, at the age of 78.
