= Mario Mattioli =

Italian volleyball player (1945–2003)

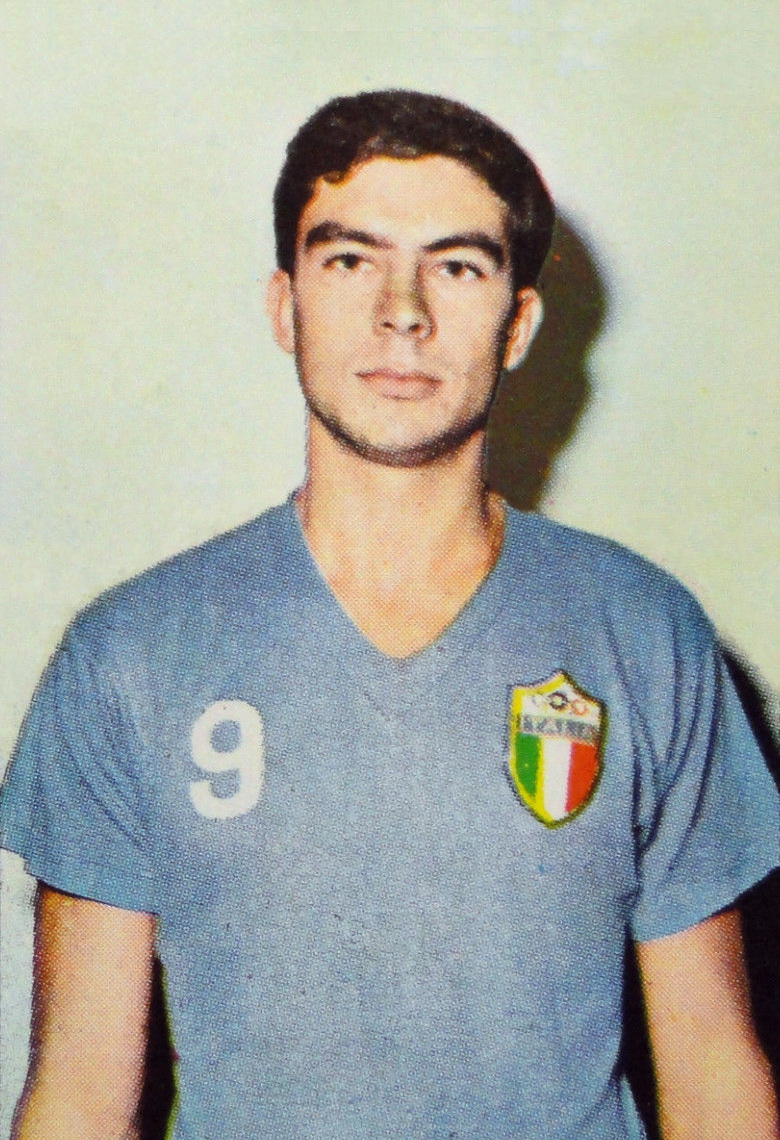

Personal information
- Born: 1 January 1945 Ravenna, Italy
- Died: 30 May 2003 (aged 58) Florence, Italy
- Height: 1.85 m (6 ft 1 in)
- Weight: 80 kg (180 lb)

Sport
- Sport: Volleyball
- Club: Ariccia Volley Club
Medal record
Representing Italy
Summer Universiade
| Gold medal – first place | 1970 Turin | Team |
Mediterranean Games
| Silver medal – second place | 1975 Algiers | Team |

Mario Mattioli (1 January 1945 – 30 May 2003) was an Italian volleyball player. He played 233 international matches for the Italian team, winning the 1970 Summer Universiade and finishing second at the 1975 Mediterranean Games and eighth at the 1976 Summer Olympics.
