= Yoshiko Akiyama =

Japanese archer (born 1949)

Yoshiko Akiyama (秋山 芳子, Akiyama Yoshiko, born 10 December 1949) is a Japanese archer who represented Japan at the 1972 Summer Olympic Games in archery.

== Olympics ==
Akiyama competed in the women's individual event and finished seventeenth with a total of 2301 points.
