= 2153 Akiyama =

Main-belt asteroid

Discovery
- Discovery site: Harvard College Obs. (George R. Agassiz Station)
- Discovery date: 1 December 1978

Designations
- Named after: Kaoru Akiyama (Japanese astronomer)
- Alternative designations: 1978 XD · 1955 UQ_{1} 1972 YA · 1973 AK_{3} 1977 VW · 1979 FS
- Minor planet category: main-belt · Themis

Orbital characteristics
- Epoch 4 September 2017 (JD 2458000.5)
- Uncertainty parameter 0
- Observation arc: 62.66 yr (22,887 days)
- Aphelion: 3.5985 AU
- Perihelion: 2.6491 AU
- Semi-major axis: 3.1238 AU
- Eccentricity: 0.1520
- Orbital period (sidereal): 5.52 yr (2,017 days)
- Mean anomaly: 58.291°
- Mean motion: 0° 10^{m} 42.6^{s} / day
- Inclination: 1.1842°
- Longitude of ascending node: 47.746°
- Argument of perihelion: 31.730°

Physical characteristics
- Dimensions: 15.42 km (calculated); 16.79±1.4 km (IRAS:2); 21.15±0.36 km
- Synodic rotation period: 12.5132±0.0053 h 12.5325±0.0053 h
- Geometric albedo: 0.069±0.017; 0.08 (assumed); 0.1089±0.020 (IRAS:2)
- Spectral type: C
- Absolute magnitude (H): 12.0 · 12.02±0.28 · 11.90 · 11.970±0.002 (R) · 11.920±0.003 (R) · 12.42

2153 Akiyama, provisional designation 1978 XD, is a carbonaceous Themistian asteroid from the outer region of the asteroid belt, approximately 17 kilometers in diameter.

The asteroid was discovered by staff members at the George R. Agassiz Station of the Harvard College Observatory on 1 December 1978, and named Japanese astronomer Kaoru Akiyama.

== Orbit and classification ==
Akiyama is a member of the Themis family, a dynamical family of outer-belt asteroids with nearly coplanar ecliptical orbits. It orbits the Sun at a distance of 2.6–3.6 AU once every 5 years and 6 months (2,017 days). Its orbit has an eccentricity of 0.15 and an inclination of 1° with respect to the ecliptic. A first precovery was taken at Palomar Observatory in 1954, extending the asteroid's observation arc by 24 years prior to its discovery.

== Physical characteristics ==
Akiyama has been characterized as a dark C-type asteroid.

=== Diameter and albedo ===
According to the space-based surveys carried out by the Infrared Astronomical Satellite IRAS and NASA's Wide-field Infrared Survey Explorer with its subsequent NEOWISE mission, Akiyama measures 16.8 and 21.2 kilometers in diameter, respectively, with a corresponding albedo of 0.11 and 0.07. The Collaborative Asteroid Lightcurve Link assumes an intermediary albedo of 0.08 and calculates a diameter of 15.4 kilometers with an absolute magnitude of 12.42.

=== Rotation period ===
Two rotational lightcurves of Akiyama were obtained from photometric observations made at the U.S. Palomar Transient Factory in October 2010 and January 2012. They showed a rotation period of 12.5325±0.0053 and 12.5132±0.0053 hours with a brightness variation of 0.26 and 0.27 in magnitude, respectively (U=2/2).

== Naming ==
This minor planet was named in memory of Japanese astronomer Kaoru Akiyama (1901–1970), professor at Hosei University, Tokyo, and widely known for his studies on minor planets. In collaboration with astronomer Kiyotsugu Hirayama, after whom the asteroid 1999 Hirayama is named, he made the first detailed orbital analysis of the asteroid 153 Hilda, which has a 2:3 orbital resonance with Jupiter. The official naming citation was published by the Minor Planet Center on 1 November 1979 (M.P.C. 5014).
