= Dietrich Grunewald =

American artist (1916–2003)

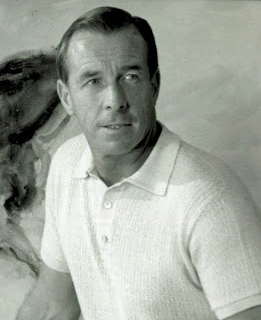
- Dietrich Grunewald, ca.1967
- Born: December 22, 1916; Oskarström, Sweden
- Died: May 21, 2003; La Quinta, CA, U.S.
- Other name: Dietrich
- Occupations: Artist; designer
- Years active: 1935–1998
- Known for: textiles; wallpapers; paintings
- Notable work: Painting; designing

Dietrich Hermann Grunewald aka Dietrich (December 22, 1916 – May 21, 2003) was a Swedish-American artist and designer, whose prolific and diverse works encompassed oils on canvas, oils on paper, serigraphs, commercial illustrations, portraits, etchings, drawings, and scenic, textile, and wallpaper designs.

== Early life ==
Dietrich Hermann Grunewald was born in Oskarström, Sweden, to parents of German ancestry. His father, Eduard Gottfried Grunewald (1873-1943), was born in Nicaragua to a German Moravian missionary and his wife, while his mother, Elisabeth Feldmann (1882-1975), was born in London to a German salesman and cigar manufacturer and his wife.

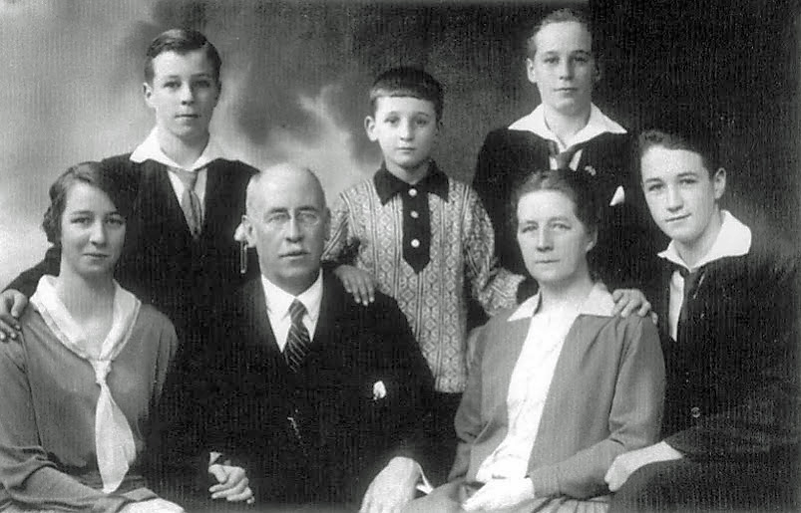
The Grunewalds, with Eduard and Elisabeth (center) and their five children (left to right): Annmarie, Dietrich, Kalle, Helmut and Gottfried, Helsingborg, Sweden, 1928

Elisabeth Feldmann studied voice and piano at the Dresden Conservatory, before deciding to become a nurse. However, her training was cut short when she had to return home to attend to family matters. Eduard Grunewald was trained in bookbinding and textile engineering, and moved to Oskarström in 1907 to work as an engineer at a textile factory. He met Elisabeth after traveling to Hernhutt, Germany, to “find himself a bride.” After a brief courtship, the couple married in 1911 and subsequently raised their family in Oskarström. In 1929, Eduard retired to become a Moravian missionary and the family moved to Helsingborg. Over the course of the next 10 years, his missionary work entailed travel to the United States, Mexico, Canada and other countries, while Elisabeth stayed at home to raise their children.

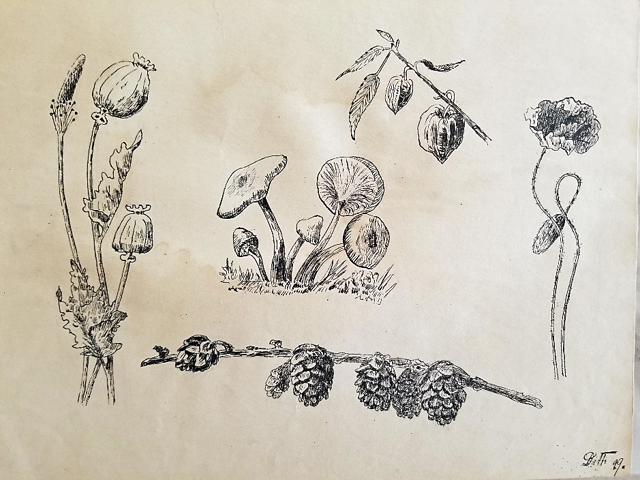
Forest plant life study, ink drawing, 1929

Dietrich's artistic training emanated from a variety of informal and formal activities. At an early age, he was said to be captivated by the foreboding nature of the pine forest behind his home, with its vast and mysterious understory. These tangible elements stimulated his curiosity and imagination prompting him to study the forest's plant life. From there, an early interest in figurative drawing led him to explore anatomy, bolstered by books his father had given him containing drawings of the Old Masters which he would copy in order to become more fluid in his free hand drawing. Between 1933 and 1935, he enrolled in commercial art classes at Welamson's Art School in Stockholm, which led to his first professional job at Herson's Agency, an advertising firm that had just opened in the city. Between 1935 and 1937, he created concepts for ad campaigns and produced renderings of the finished artwork for Herson's, while also working freelance as an illustrator for magazine publishers.

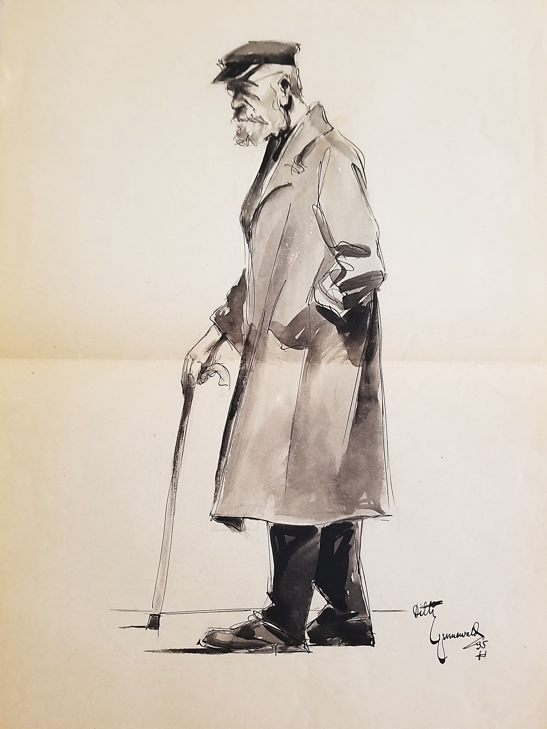
Character study, sepia ink drawing, 1935

After moving to Helsingborg with his family in 1929, he was stricken with polio and rheumatic fever within two years of moving there. Even after overcoming these afflictions, a train accident at the age of 20 shattered his right knee, leaving him nearly incapacitated and questioning his future. In the aftermath of his surgery, he recalled an ad he had seen in the back pages of the Saturday Evening Post for study at the American Academy of Art in Chicago and resolved to chart a new course by moving to America to pursue his childhood dream of becoming a fine artist.

In February 1938, Dietrich arrived in the US and began attending classes at the American Academy of Art. Although he had been persuaded by its director to study commercial art, not long after entering the program, he began skipping classes to immerse himself in the galleries of the Art Institute of Chicago. Before the semester had ended, he had decided to leave Chicago and head west in pursuit of a career as an artist.

== Career ==
=== Scenic design and drafting ===
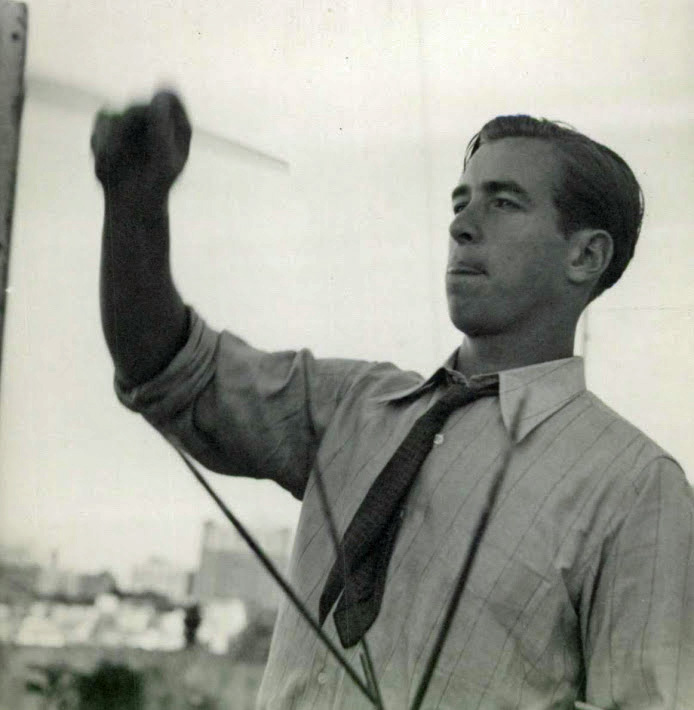
Dietrich at the easel, San Francisco, ca.1940

After leaving Chicago, Dietrich initially settled in downtown Los Angeles, where he enrolled in classes to study anatomical drawing at night and poured over art books housed at the Los Angeles Public Library during the day. Also during this time, he began producing a series of etchings documenting the city's street life. In 1938, he met a Danish conductor named Charles Lautrup who invited him to design the sets for a one-night production he was to be conducting of the Danish national music-drama, “Elverhøj” (aka “The Elves’ Hill”), as part of the 1939 Golden Gate International Exposition. Dietrich accepted Lautrup's offer and soon found himself relocating to San Francisco, where he began research, producing concept and final drawings, and working with a team to create the backdrops.

“Elverhøj” was performed at the War Memorial Opera House on June 18, 1939. On the night of the performance, he met heldentenor, Lauritz Melchior, and veteran character actor, Jean Hersholt, both of whom urged him to explore production work in Hollywood. In the months following the performance, he stayed in San Francisco and resumed a course of independent art study by regular visits to the library, taking night classes in etching and drypoint, and capturing the Bay Area’s urban, rural and waterfront scenery through paintings, drawings and etchings, which were exhibited at the Courvoisier Galleries in San Francisco.

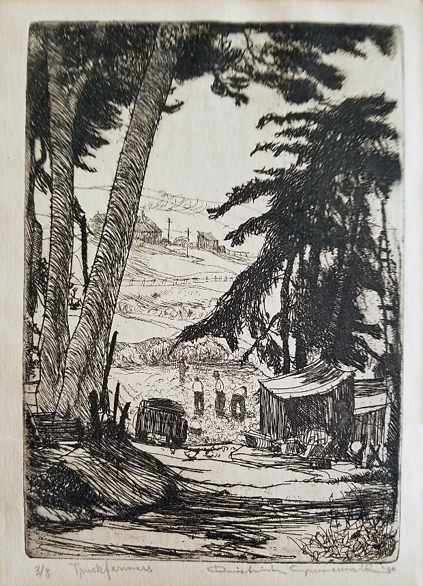
Truckfarmers etching, 1940

In 1940, he returned to Los Angeles and was hired for production work at 20th Century-Fox Studios, where he was tasked with projecting dimensional drawings from architectural blueprints to facilitate set construction, along with continuity sketches. His initial assignments consisted of two Carmen Miranda musicals, Down Argentine Way and Springtime in the Rockies. His next assignment was at Paramount Pictures where he worked under the supervision of acclaimed production designer William Cameron Menzies to create the storyboards for For Whom the Bell Tolls.

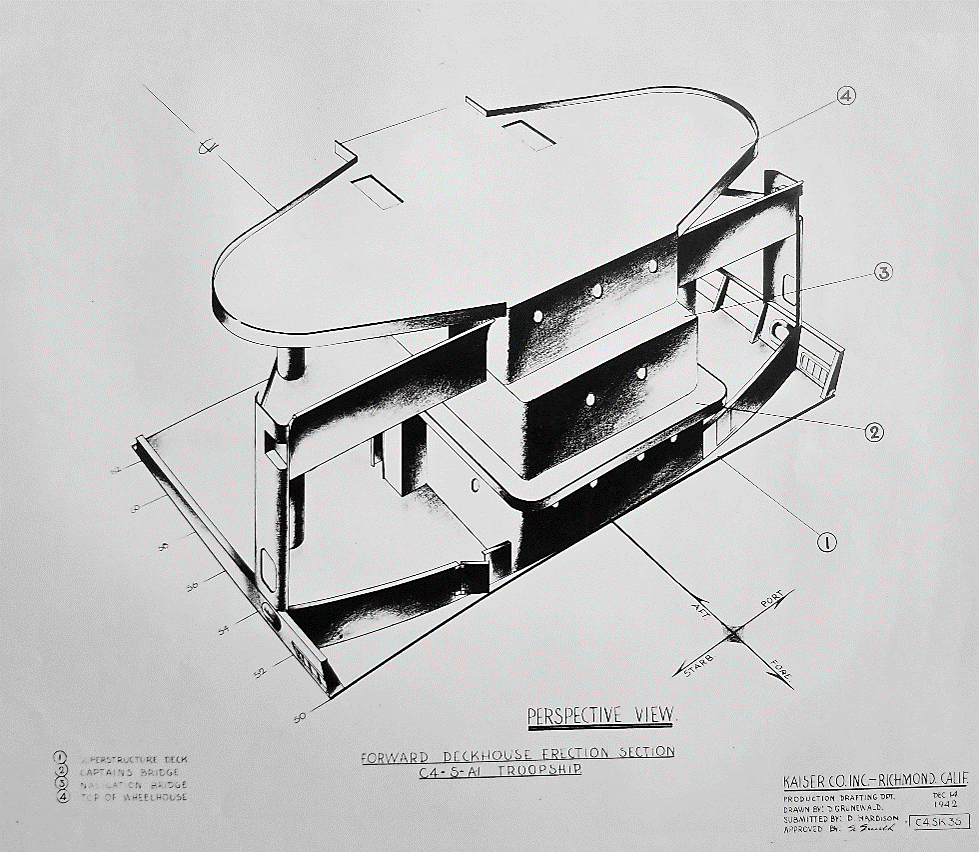
"Perspective View, Forward Deckhouse Erection Section" axonometric drawing, Kaiser Co., Inc., Richmond CA, 1942

Following America's entry into World War II, Kaiser Shipyards in Vancouver, Washington, contacted him about applying his drafting skills to aid in war production. Similar to what he had done at 20th Century-Fox, he was tasked with creating axonometric drawings from architectural blueprints to aid in ship construction. In late spring 1942, he moved to Portland, Oregon, where he commuted every day to the Kaiser Shipyards in Vancouver. By winter, he had received an offer to transfer to the shipyards in Richmond, enabling him to return to the Bay Area. As a Swedish citizen, Dietrich had initially come to the US on a student visa and had looked into the possibility of applying for American citizenship. However, once the US entered the war, his becoming a citizen was contingent upon his going to war, which he refused to do. Alternately, he was advised by the Swedish Consulate that he could obtain an exemption based on his Swedish citizenship, and re-apply after the war ended. However, as he learned at the war's conclusion, it would not be possible to do so until many years to come, when he finally became an American citizen at the age of 80.

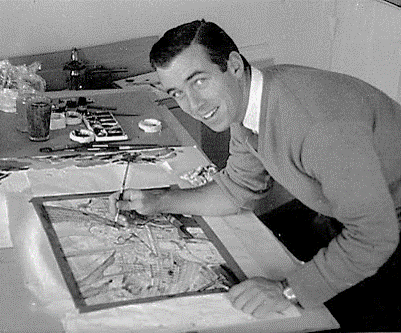
Dietrich creating a storyboard for The Princess and the Pirate at Samuel Goldwyn Productions, Hollywood, 1944

In 1944, he was hired by Samuel Goldwyn Productions in Hollywood to create the storyboards for the Danny Kaye musical Up in Arms, and the Bob Hope comedy The Princess and the Pirate. This in turn led to an assignment at Walt Disney Productions, where he created the matte drawings for the live-action background sequences of Song of the South.

=== Textiles and wallpapers ===
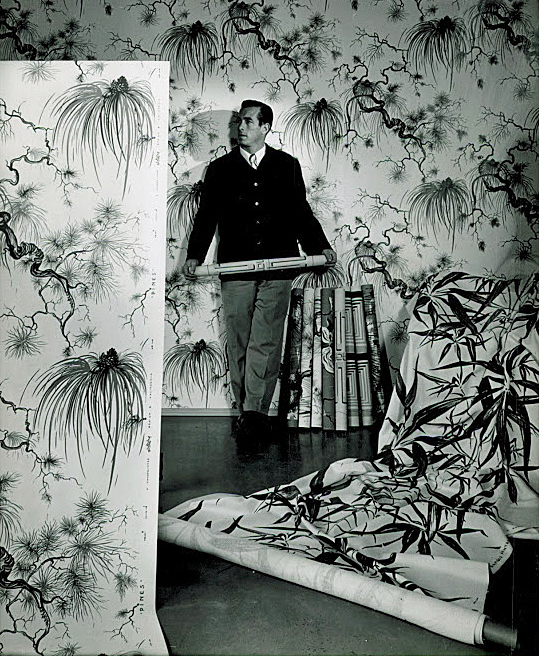
Dietrich Studios publicity photo showing the designer surrounded by his textile and wallpapers designs, ca.1950

A studio-wide strike between 1945 and 1946 compelled Dietrich to venture beyond the art departments of Hollywood and explore new ways of making a living. Heeding the suggestion of costume designer, Edith Head, he contacted San Francisco-based textile designer and weaver, Dorothy Liebes, about the prospect of branching out into wallpaper and textile design. In addition to her success as a designer and weaver, Liebes was also a savvy businesswoman. After reviewing his sketches and color samples, she invited him to showcase his work that fall to her East Coast buyers at New York City's Gotham Hotel. For the next two months, he worked on developing a design portfolio for the showcase, which Liebes would later brand “The New California Look.” The success of this showcase enabled him to forge a new path in textile and wallpaper design, securing contracts with leading U.S. manufacturers, such as Scalamandré Silks, Schumacher & Co., Kent-Bragaline, Katzenbach and Warren, and Morley-Fletcher. Some of his more popular designs for textiles and wallpapers included Asian-inspired motives of cherry, pine and ming trees, Southwestern pueblos, Over-sized oak leaves printed on Peruvian linen and scenes of Americana. In particular, Dietrich's oak leaf design on Peruvian linen received national attention through exhibitions at the Metropolitan Museum of Art, Museum of Modern Art and the Art Institute of Chicago, among others. Upon his return from New York, he rented a storefront on West 3rd Street in West Hollywood, where he worked as a freelance designer until opening Dietrich Studios in 1948. By the late 1950s, Dietrich's textile and wallpaper designs could be found on the walls, windows and furniture of various U.S. Embassies; President Truman’s “Little White House” in Key West, Florida; the Governor's Palace in Manila; the S.S. United States; and an array of popular hotels, such as the Ambassador, Beverly Hills, Oceanhouse, Tropicana, Flamingo and St. Francis.

=== Serigraphs ===
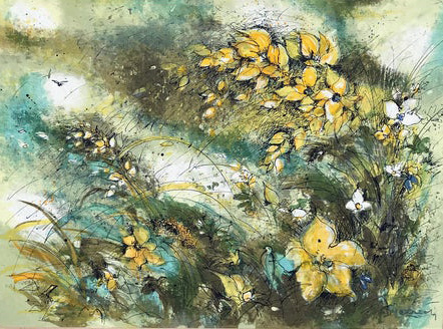
Serigraph produced by the Van Amstel Co., ca.1965

Dietrich's introduction to serigraphs started at Dietrich Studios, where he began experimenting with design and production. Soon, he was producing pairs and trios of prints unified by theme and palette that he marketed as “decorative paintings” to complement his wallpaper and textile designs. In 1949, he met a German framer named Werner Rodman, who sought to capitalize on Dietrich's artistry through a collaborative venture. In the mid-1950s, Rodman proposed a plan whereby the artist would create the designs for serigraphs and monitor production of them, while Rodman, operating under the auspices of the Van Amstel Company, would produce, market and distribute them. Over the next 25 years, Dietrich made regular visits to Van Amstel's Culver City factory, where he supervised production of his limited-edition serigraphs, which were then sold through department stores across the country, such as Broadway, Bullock's, Gimbels, Macy's, Marshall Field & Co. and others. Dietrich's association with Rodman and Van Amstel proved to be a successful partnership that provided him with the financial grounding to pursue his lifelong ambition to become a fine artist.

=== Paintings ===
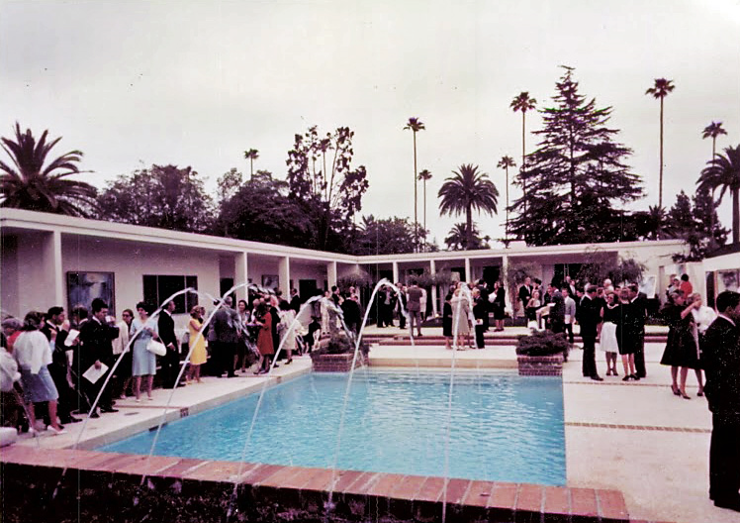
Dietrich Vernissage at the William Tishman Home, Beverly Hills, June 1963

By the mid-1950s, Dietrich's goal of becoming a fine artist had been overshadowed by the constant demand to produce textile, wallpaper and serigraph designs. Frustrated by a lack of progress, he resolved to rededicate himself to his childhood dream through independent study and experimentation. In 1959, he acquired a studio residence in the Los Angeles suburb of Pacific Palisades, and in 1961, he was commissioned to paint a large-scale mural for the new Union Federal Bank headquarters in downtown Los Angeles. This was followed by another mural commission for the Prudential Life Insurance Company.

Two years later, he partnered with real estate scion, developer and interior designer, William Tishman, to present an exhibition of his impressionist works at a house Tishman had built on spec in Beverly Hills. The event, billed as “The Vernissage of ‘Dietrich’”, attracted over 2,000 people on its opening weekend in June 1963, including decorators, interior designers, architects, art collectors, society people and celebrities, and the general public. The vernissage marked his formal introduction into Southern California's art colony, and was a prelude to a host of exhibitions throughout California and in various cities across America, as well as in galleries in Sydney, Toronto, El Salvador, Hong Kong and Stockholm. In 1993, he moved to La Quinta, California, where he continued to show and paint until the late 1990s.

=== Style and technique ===
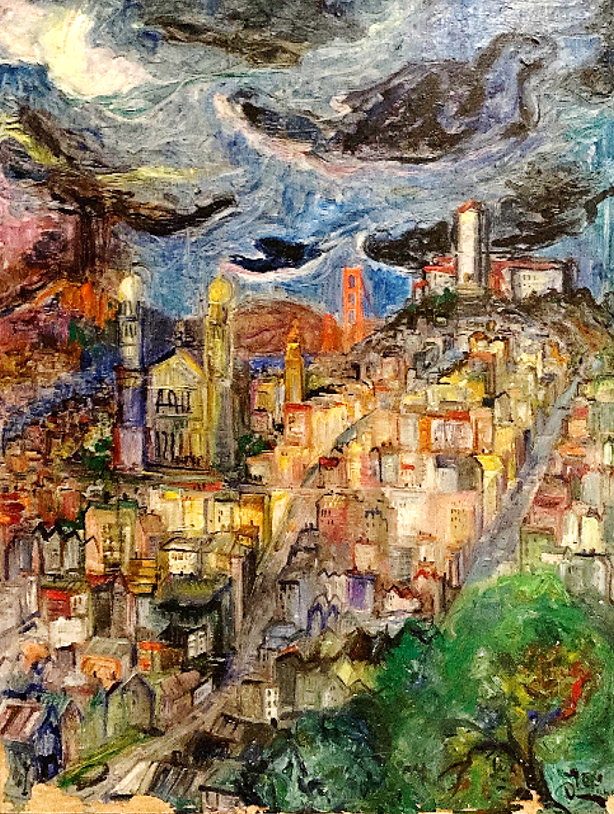
San Francisco panorama showing Dietrich's application of the impasto technique, ca.1940, oil on canvas, 24x20

A study of Dietrich's early paintings from the late 1930s and early 1940s reflects his attraction to Van Gogh's bold use of color and the impasto technique, characterized by thick layers of paint showing the texture of brush strokes or a palette knife. Color would continue to play a significant role in his work and he also cited the influence of Pierre Bonnard for his “nuanced color arrangements” and Henri Matisse for his “original use of color, an intuitive control of space and innovative sense of spatial exploration”.

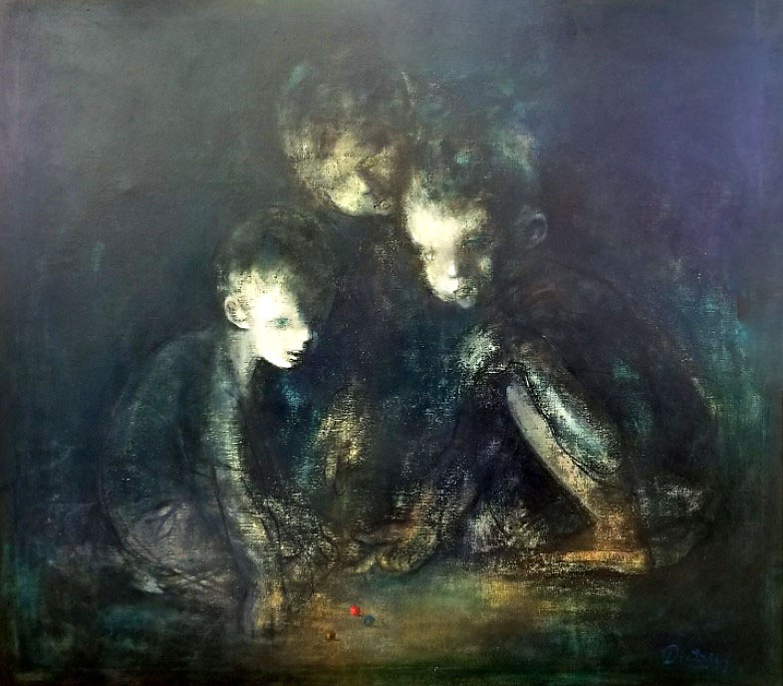
The Marble Players showing Dietrich's experimentation with chiaroscuro, 1958, oil on canvas, 43x49

Dietrich was also influenced by the works of Caravaggio, Murillo and Rembrandt, whose strength lay in their ability to master light and emphasize the enigmatic qualities of shadow, or chiaroscuro. He began experimenting with this technique by scouring and glazing the dark colors to extract the light from the canvas. He also cited the figures and landscapes of Leonardo, Michelangelo, Raphael and Dürer as being fundamental to his exploration and treatment of this subject matter.

Beyond the Old Masters and early Modernists, two experiences left a deep impression on him: one, when as a child sitting in his mother's lap, he looked out the window and witnessed the early morning sky flaring up in a brilliant cascade of light, and the other, when he arrived in the Central California Valley as a young man and was bedazzled by a field of flowers. He noted that his fascination with light and color, long preserved in his dreams, emerged in a binding theme and permeated his creative endeavors. Seeking to translate these wonders of nature to his oils on canvas, he discovered that spatial depth could only be attained through the luminosity of the color and the graduation of light, achieved by a wet-on-wet technique that prevented any individual pigment from dominating the composition.

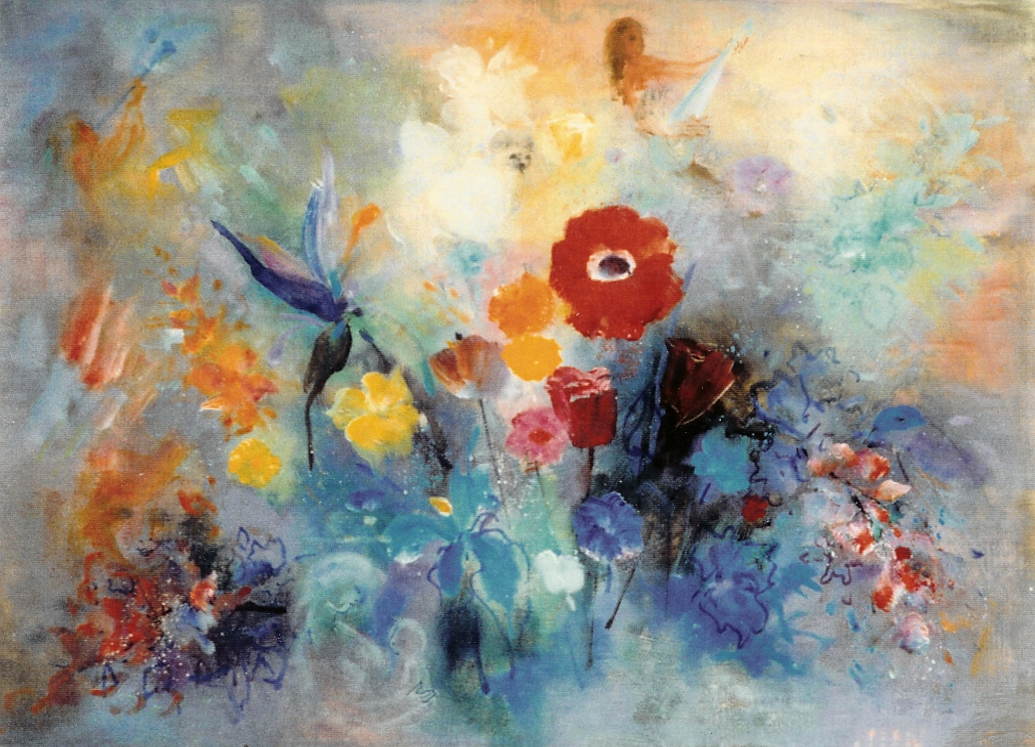
Rites of Spring showing Dietrich's incorporation of fantasy imagery into a flowerscape, 1960, oil on canvas, 30x36

Dietrich would often employ fantasy imagery within a variety of natural settings as a way of breathing life into his work. Describing these flora fantasies as “leaps of imagination”, his imagery took the form of solitary nudes, lovers, musicians, sprites, animals, or any combination thereof set within idyllic settings that included flowerscapes, fields, meadows or forests.

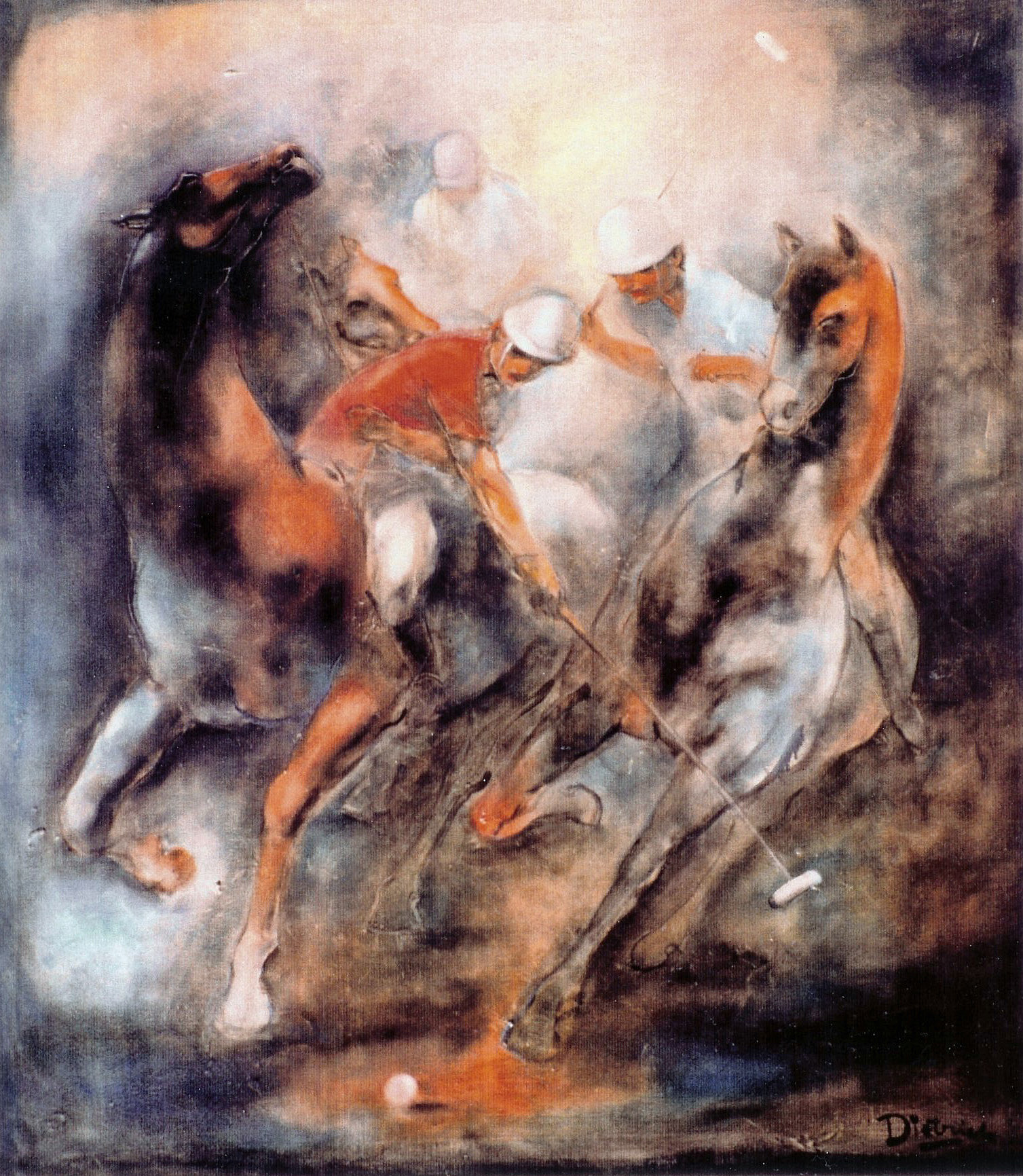
Polo Players, 1970, oil on canvas, 48x42

In some instances, he worked from photos provided by his patrons to incorporate the faces of their children into these settings. In the realm of figural representation, he took inspiration from Käthe Kollwitz for her transcendent works reflecting human passion and Grandma Moses for her ability to convey the purity of childlike innocence.

Dietrich's study of human anatomy found its ultimate expression in a series of quasi-life-size sports paintings depicting football, baseball, soccer and tennis players, track-and-field athletes, and surfers. He was also captivated by horses and the ways in which their physicality and movement could be expressed on the canvas, whether running wild, racing across a finish line or entangled in a polo match. Other subjects included children, lovers, matadors, mother and child tableaus, musicians, nudes, cityscapes, landscapes, townscapes, waterfronts and sailboats. Over the course of his fine art career, flora fantasies and horses would be recurring themes of his work.

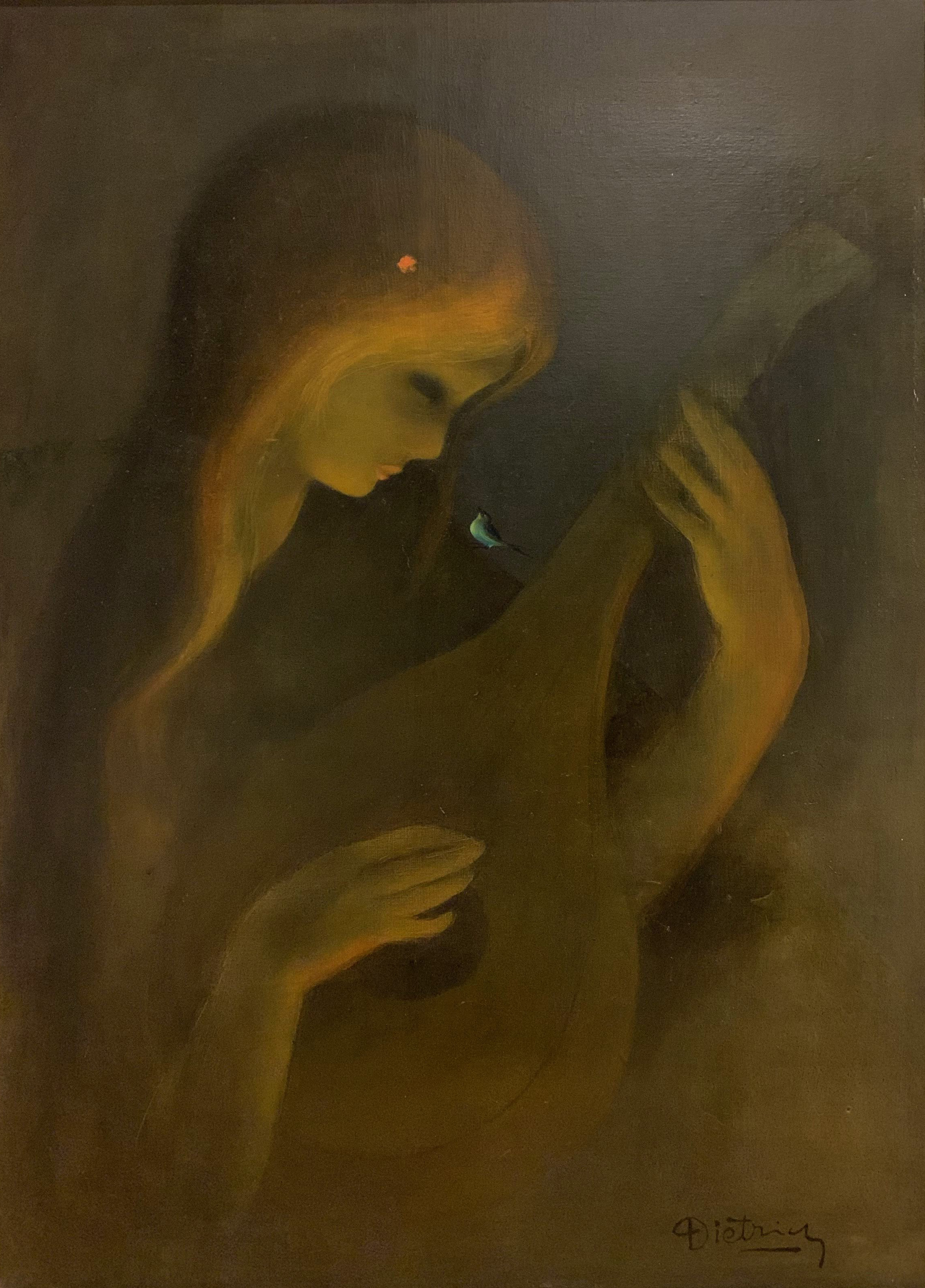
Serenade, oil on canvas, 33x24

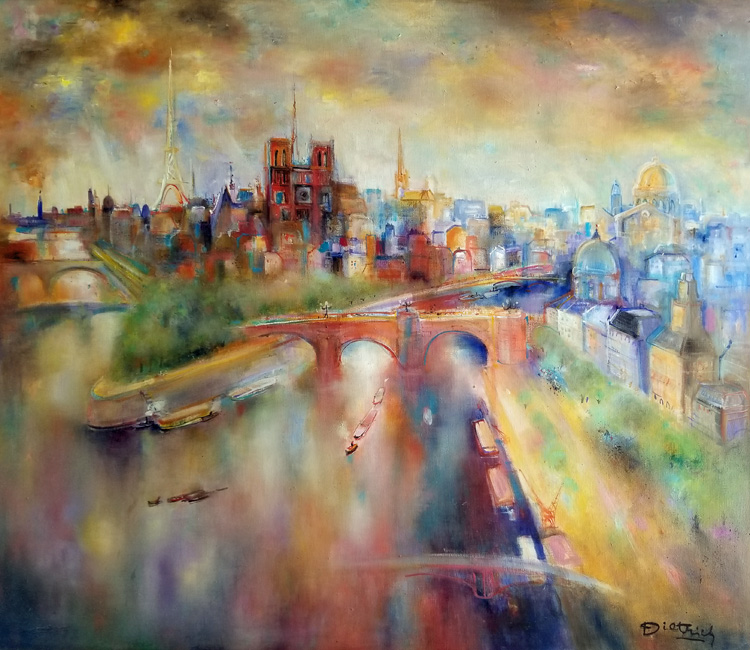
Seine View, Paris, oil on canvas, 36x42

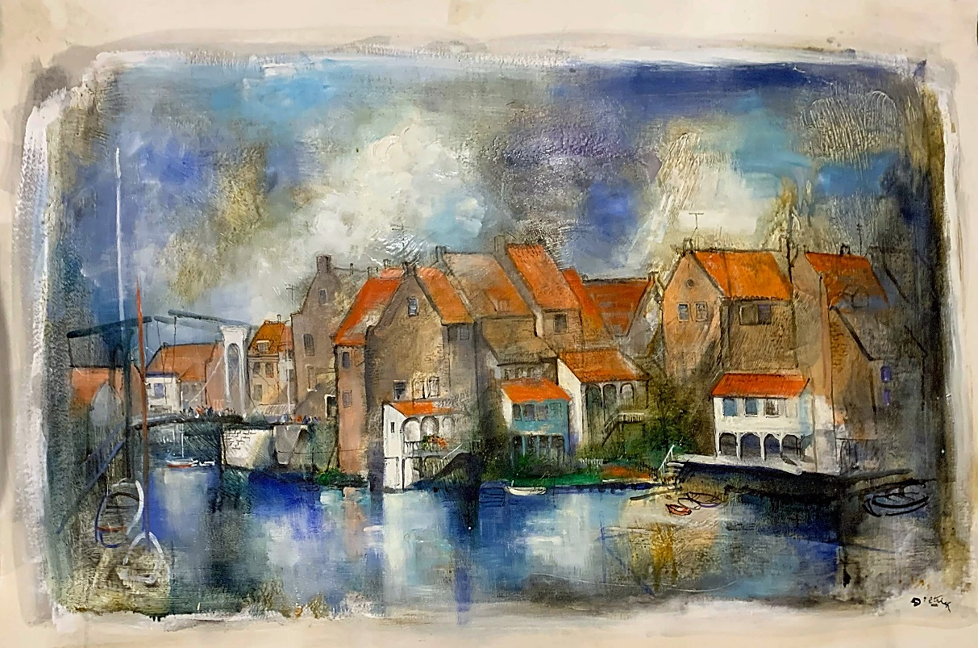
Waterfront scene, oil on paper, 26x40

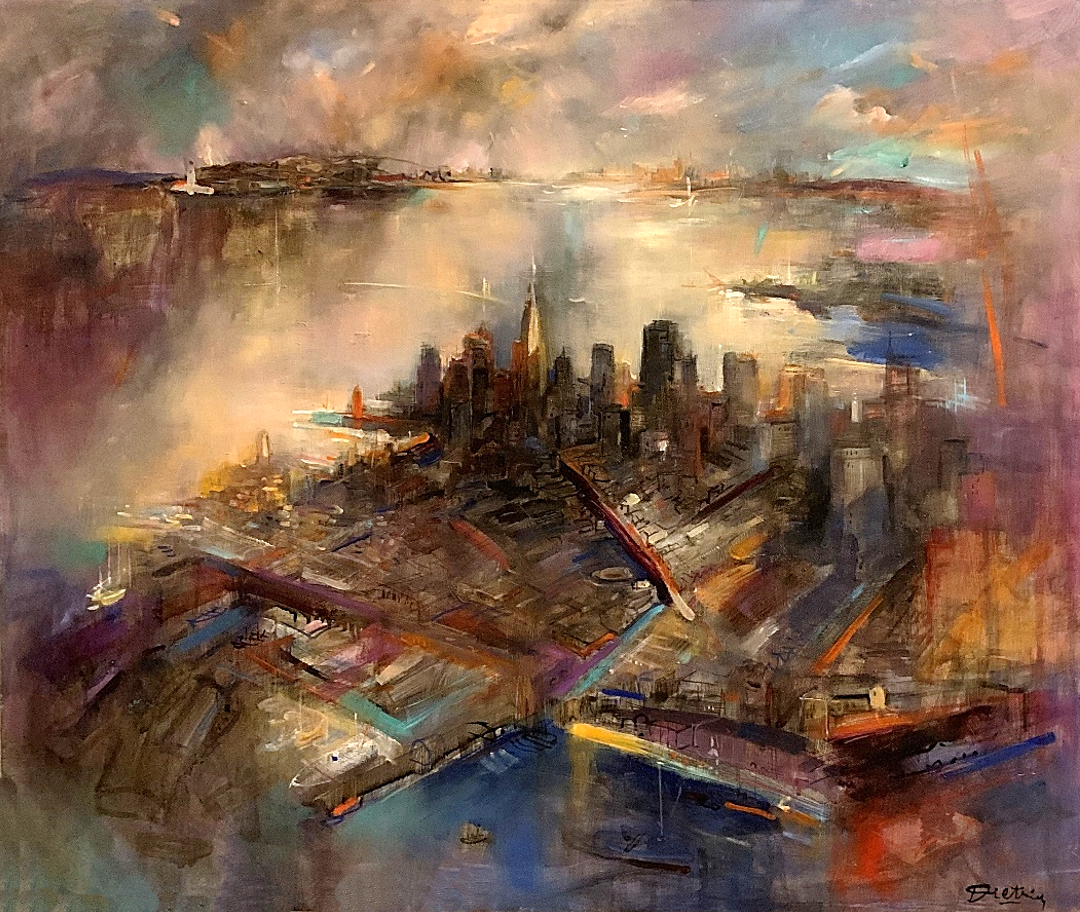
Skyview, San Francisco, oil on canvas, 26x31

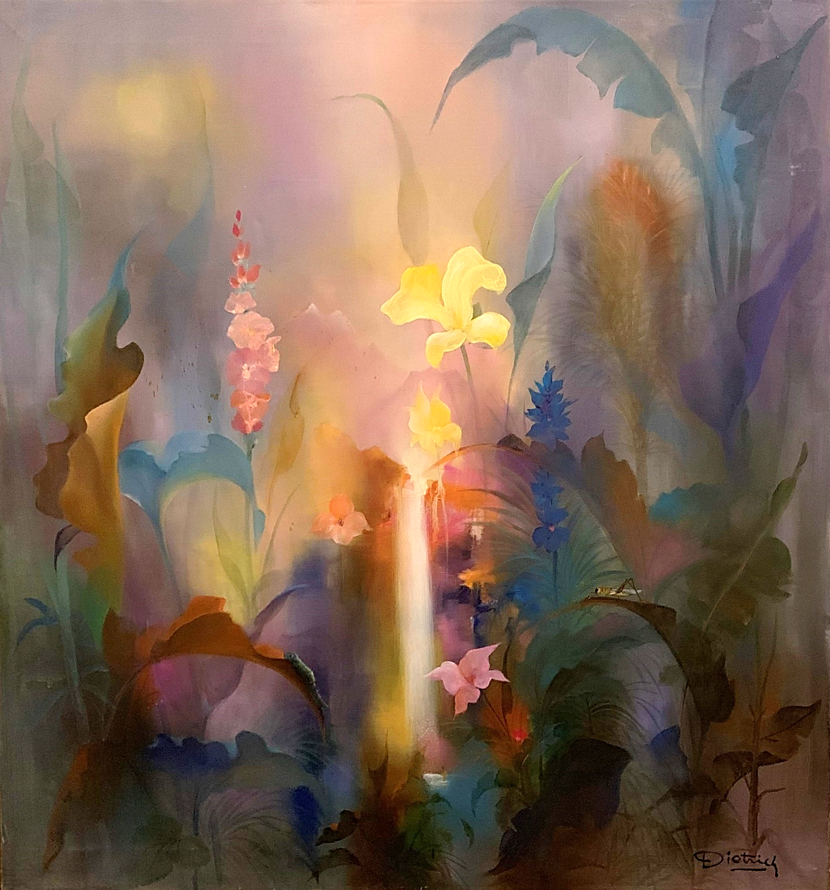
Tropical Fantasy, oil on canvas, 32x30

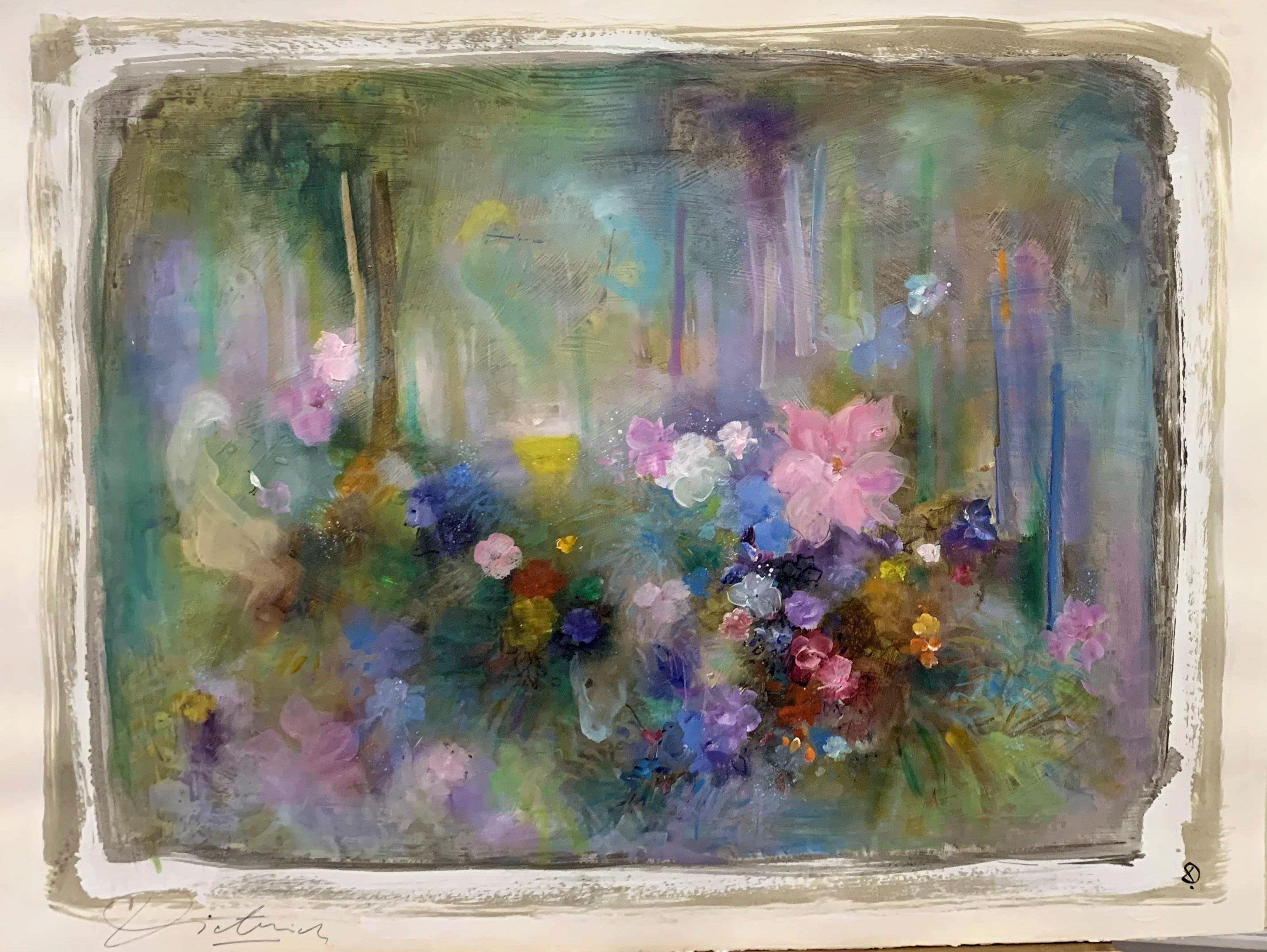
Enchanted Forest, oil on paper, 22x30

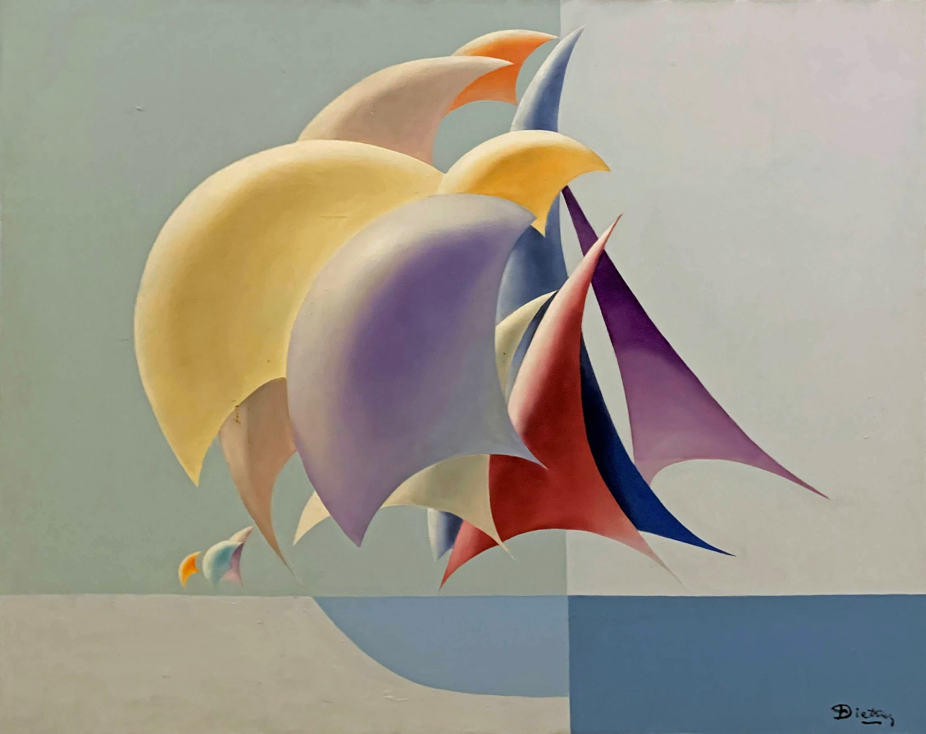
Billowing Sails, oil on canvas, 39x48

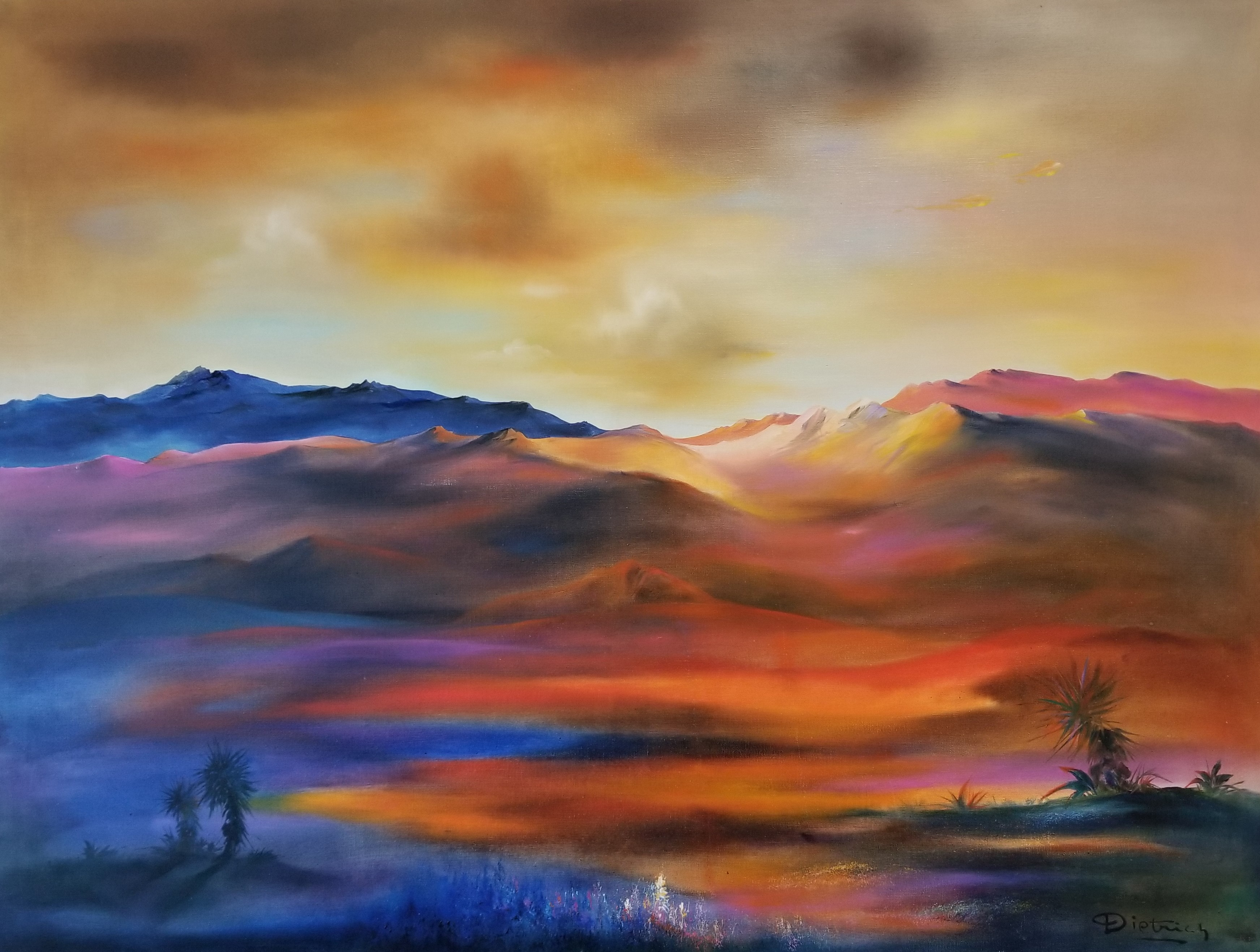
Desert Sunset, oil on canvas, 36x48

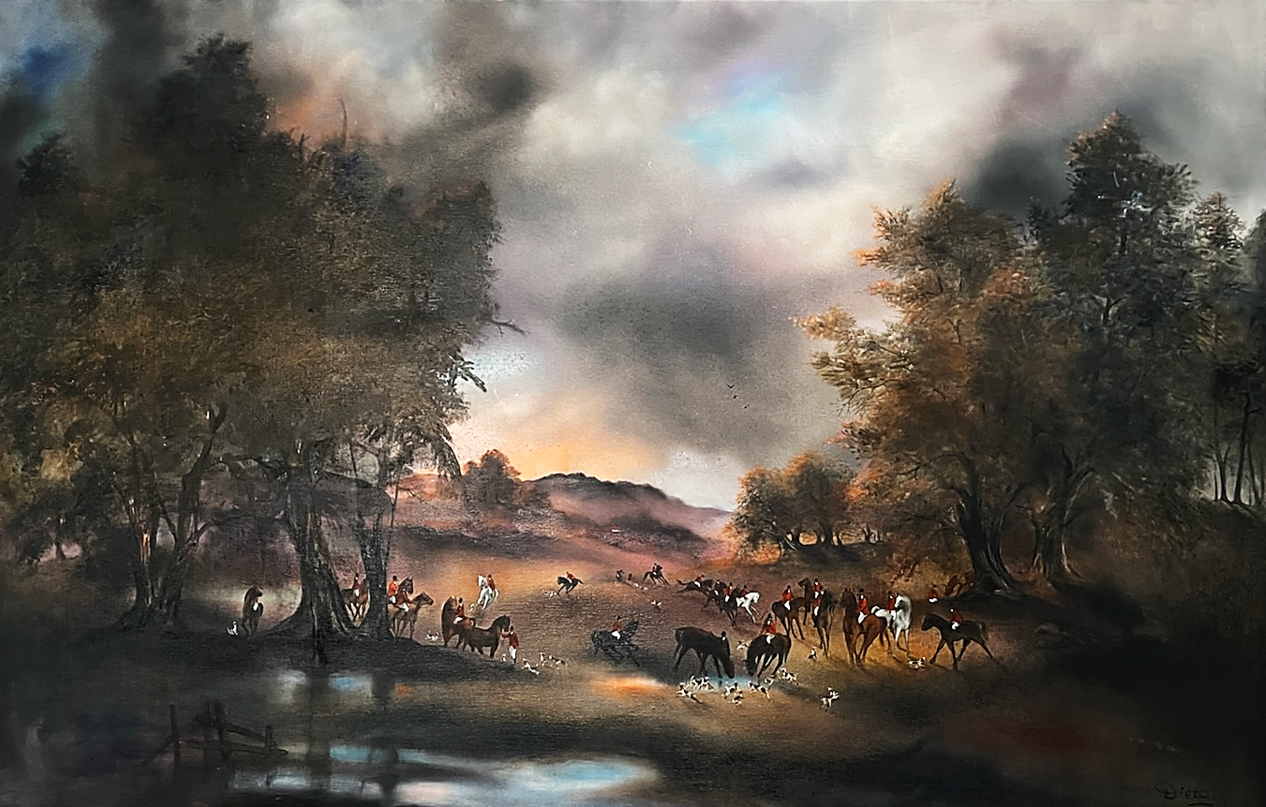
Day of the Hunt, oil on canvas, 36x57

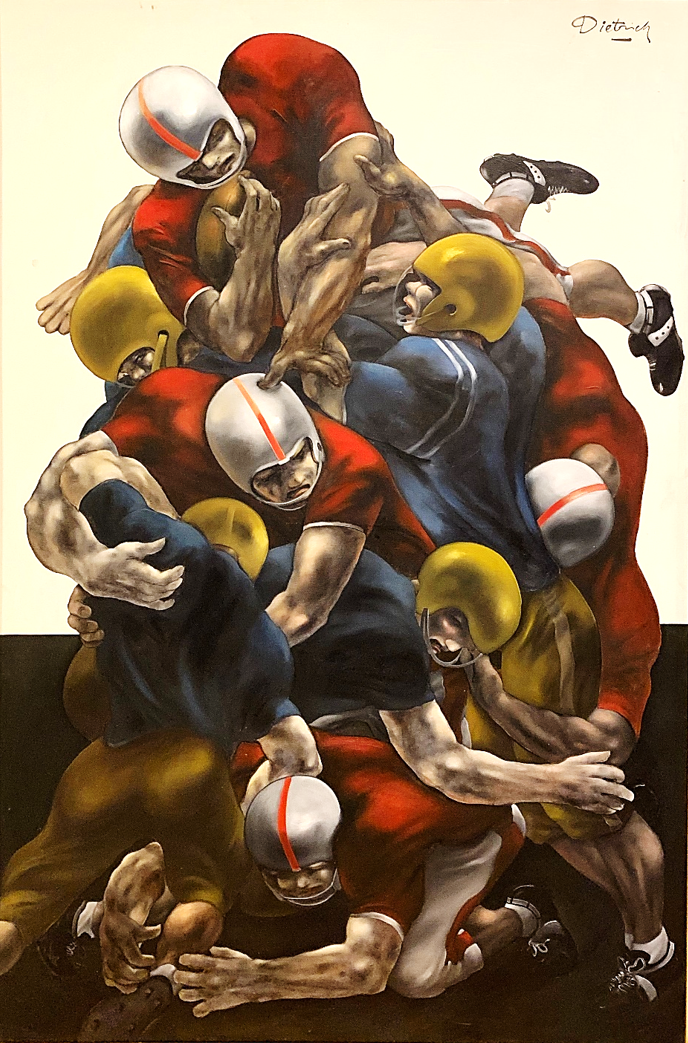
Goal Line Stand, oil on canvas, 78x42

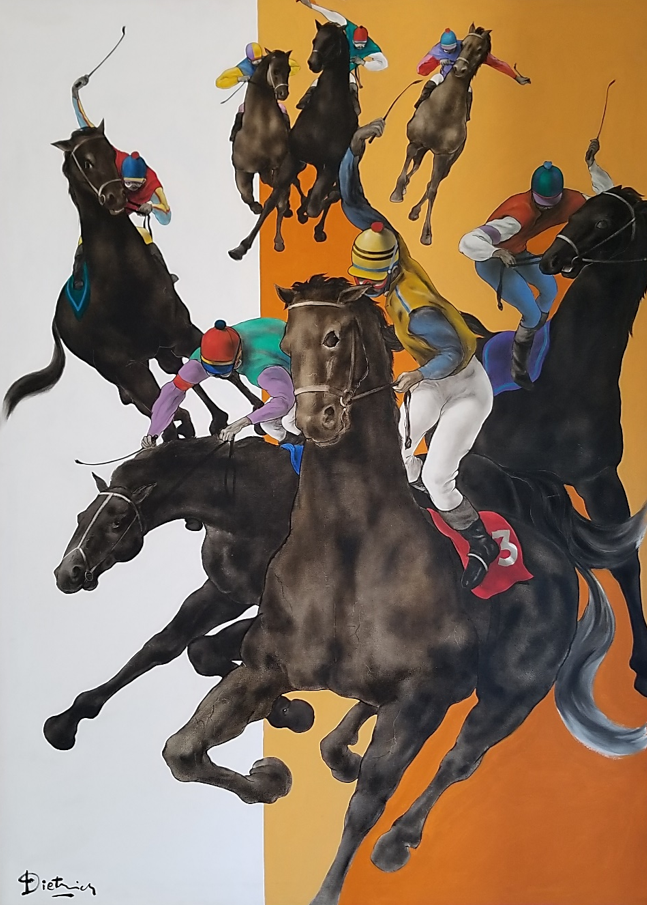
"The End of the Race", oil on canvas, 70x51

== Personal life ==
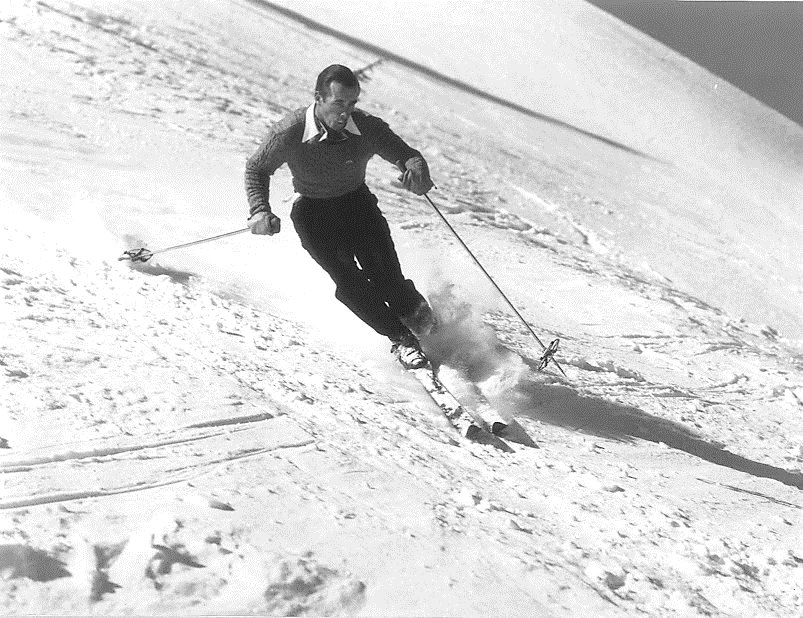
Dietrich skiing at Squaw Valley, CA, 1951

Dietrich participated in sports both recreationally and competitively over the course of his lifetime, including soccer, tennis, skiing and body surfing. He was married four times and had five children by his first three marriages and two stepchildren by his third and fourth marriages. His first wife was Natalie Nicolaief Vally (1899-1988), a freelance photographer from Russia. They married in 1942 and had a daughter. His second wife was Mai-Britt Cedeby (1920-1980), a film and television script supervisor from Sweden. They married in 1950 and had two sons. His third wife was Reneé Gold Zutrau (1927-1976), a fashion designer, illustrator, costume supervisor, and artist from West Caldwell, New Jersey. She was a single mother with a son at the time they met. They married in 1959 and had two sons together. His fourth wife was Patty Gilbert Hurst (1936- ), a loan processor from Beverly Hills, who was a single mother with a daughter at the time they met. They married in 1967 and had just celebrated their 36th wedding anniversary the day before he died in 2003.

== Exhibitions and gallery representation ==
Key:

E = exhibitions G = gallery representation

Exhibition Locations
Year	Location	Exhibition Type
1939	Courvoisier Galleries, San Francisco	E
1939	Daniel Koshland Residence, San Francisco, California	E
1946-1955	Modern Museum of Art, NY	E
1946-1955	New York, NY	E
1946-1955	Art Institute of Chicago, IL	E
1956-1963	Various U.S. cities	E
1956-1963	Sydney, Australia	E
1956-1963	Toronto, Canada	E
1956-1993	Monteverdi-Young showroom, Los Angeles/West Hollywood, CA (G)	G
1959-1993	Dietrich studio residence, Pacific Palisades, CA (showings by appointment)	E
1963	Blue Lagoon Villas, Laguna Beach, Beverly Hills, CA	E
1963	Gregg Juarez Gallery, Nice, France	E/G
1964	Blue Lagoon Villas, Laguna Beach, CA	E
1964	Ted Phillips residence, Huntington Harbour, CA	E
1965	Gregg Juarez Galleries, Los Angeles, CA and Palm Beach, FL	E/G
1966	Axel Danielson residence, Los Angeles, CA	E
1969-1975	San Francisco, CA	G
1969-1975	Minneapolis, MN	G
1970-1980	DeVeaux Gallery, Carmel,	G
1974	Dietrich studio residence, Pacific Palisades, CA	E
1975	Alexis Art Gallery, San Salvador, El Salvador	E
1976	Dietrich studio residence, Pacific Palisades, CA	E
1976	Brand Library and Art Center, Glendale	E
1977	Zantman Art Galleries, Palm Desert and Carmel, CA	E/G
1979	Asia Gallery, Hong Kong	E
1980	La Cañada Flintridge, CA	E
1980	Descanso Gardens, La Cañada Flintridge, CA	E -
1981	Zantman Art Galleries, Palm Desert and Carmel, CA	E/G
1981	Danica showroom, Beverly Hills, CA	E
1983	Sunbird Art Gallery, Los Altos, CA	E/G
1983	Lyon Art Gallery, San Francisco, CA	E/G
1985	Bengtsson Gallery, Stockholm, Sweden	E/G
1986	Zantman Art Galleries, Palm Desert, CA	E
1986	Tatum Gallery, Ft. Lauderdale, FL	E
1987	Tatum Gallery, Ft. Lauderdale, FL	E/G
1987	Sunbird Gallery, Los Altos, CA (	E/G
1987	Zantman Art Galleries, Carmel, CA	E/G
1988	American Embassy, El Salvador, San Salvador	E
1989	Dietrich residence, Pacific Palisades, CA	E
1989	Zantman Art Galleries, Palm Desert, CA	E/G
1989	Park Shore Gallery, Naples, FL	E/G
1989	Laguna Niguel, CA	E
1989	Margaret Sjodin residence, Malibu, CA	E
1990	Tokyo, Japan	E
1990	Berlin, Germany	E
1990	Bengtsson Gallery, Stockholm, Sweden	E
1993	Zantman Art Galleries, Palm Desert, CA	E/G
1993-2003	Dietrich residence, LaQuinta, CA	(showings by appointment)

== Sources ==
- Castagno, John “Grunewald, Dietrich.” Artists’ Monograms and Indiscernible Signatures: An International Dictionary, 1800-1991. Metuchen, N.J. /London: The Scarecrow Press, Inc., 1991.
- Dietrich Studios
- “Grunewald, Dietrich.” European Artists Signatures and Monograms, 1800-1991. Metuchen, N.J./London: The Scarecrow Press, Inc., 1990.
- Kienholz, Lyn, ed. (Elizabeta Betinski and Corinne Nelson, contributing eds.) “Dietrich.” L.A. Rising: SoCal Artists Before 1980. Los Angeles: The California/International Arts Foundation, 2010.
- Vollmer, H. (K.G. Saur, ed.) “Grunewald, Dietrich.” Allgemeines Künstlerlexikon (The Artists of the World). Vol. 4. München/ Leipzig: K.G. Saur, 2000.
