= Luther Vye =

British hockey player

Personal information
- Born: 19 April 1924 Christchurch, Dorset, England
- Died: 10 May 2003 (aged 79) Dorset, England

Sport
- Sport: Field hockey
- Position: Goalkeeper
Senior career
Years	Team	Caps	Goals
1955–1956	Hampstead	-	-
National team
Years	Team	Caps	Goals
–	Great Britain		-
–	England		-

Charles Luther Vye (19 April 1924 – 10 May 2003) was a field hockey player who was selected for Great Britain at the 1956 Summer Olympics. He was also the headmaster of Cabin Hill Preparatory school of Campbell College in Belfast.

== Biography ==
Vye was born to a hockey family, all three of his brothers William (b.1922), Michael (b.1926) and Philip (b.1927) played for Bournemouth at club level and at county level for Hampshire. He studied at University College, Oxford.

Representing the South and Middlesex, Vye attended the England hockey trials at Felstead School in March 1956. He played club hockey for Hampstead Hockey Club and his position was goalkeeper.

Vye was called up for the Great Britain team before he had earned a cap for England. Vye represented Great Britain in the field hockey tournament at the 1956 Olympic Games in Melbourne. He was one of the two goalkeepers in the Olympic squad but was back up to first choice David Archer.

In 1967, he took the post of headmaster at the Cabin Hill Preparatory school of Campbell College in Belfast, where he remained for many years until 1983.
