= Viola Muir =

Canadian archer (born 1934)

Lela Viola Muir (born 4 November 1934) is a Canadian archer who competed in the 1972 Summer Olympic Games in archery. Muir was born in Duncan, British Columbia.

Muir finished 8th in the women's individual event with a score of 1955 points.
