= Yuzuki Akiyama =

Japanese actress (born 1993)

- 秋山 ゆずき
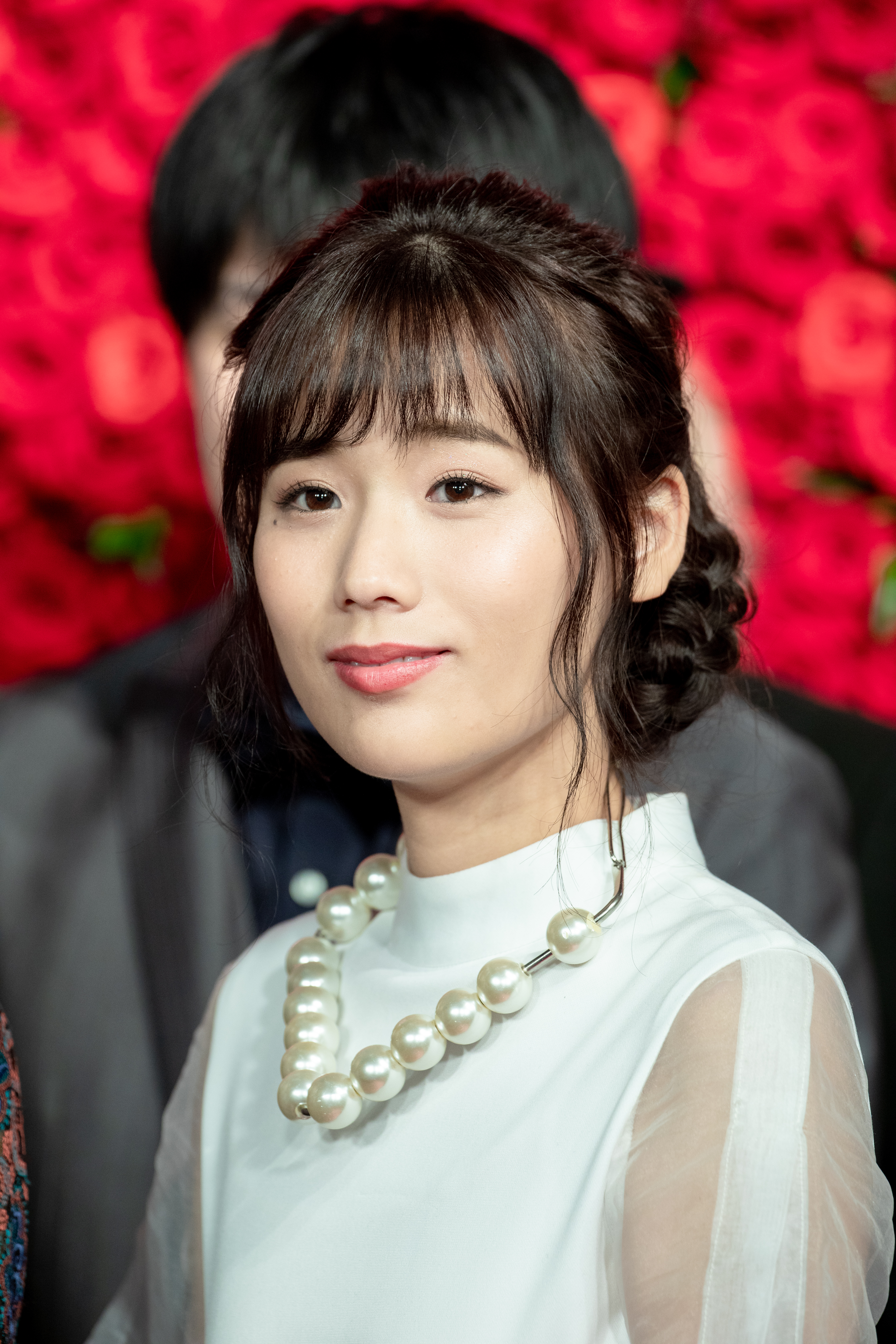
- Akiyama at the 31st Tokyo International Film Festival in 2018
- Born: 14 April 1993 (age 33); Saitama Prefecture, Japan
- Other name: Yuzuki Hashimoto (former stage name)
- Occupation: Actress
- Years active: 2008–present
- Agent: Asobi System
- Known for: One Cut of the Dead

Yuzuki Akiyama (秋山 ゆずき, Akiyama Yuzuki; born April 14, 1993 in Saitama Prefecture) is a Japanese actress who rose to fame for her role in the indie film One Cut of the Dead. She is represented by her agency Asobi System. Her former stage name was Yuzuki Hashimoto (橋本 柚稀).

== Career ==
She entered the industry as a junior idol under the stage name Yuzuki Hashimoto in 2008. From 2010 and onward, her focus changed to theatre, reprising various roles on stage. She changed her stage name to Yuzuki Akiyama in 2012 and joined various theatre groups without major success in her career.

In 2017, she starred in the indie zombie comedy film One Cut of the Dead, which was a major hit in Japan, and sparked an international cult following as well. The film made her famous and she was signed by Asobi System. Since then, Akiyama has had a number of commercial, theatre and television appearances.

== Filmography ==
=== Film ===
- One Cut of the Dead (2017), Aika Matsumoto
- Curling Dream (2024)
- Love is Outdated (2024), Ayumi Saeki

=== Television ===
- Queen (2019), Yuzuki Aoi
