= Patrick Kiernan (equestrian) =

Irish equestrian

Personal information
- Full name: Patrick Joseph Kiernan
- Nationality: Irish
- Born: 6 June 1929; Drogheda, Ireland
- Died: 6 May 2003 (aged 73); Dublin, Ireland

Sport
- Sport: Equestrian

Patrick Joseph Kiernan (6 June 1929 – 6 May 2003) was an Irish equestrian. He competed in two events at the 1956 Summer Olympics.
