= Ágnes Hamvas =

Hungarian archer (born 1946)

Agnes Hamvas (born 3 September 1946) is a Hungarian archer who represented Hungary in archery at the 1972 Summer Olympic Games.

== Career ==
She finished 22nd in the women's individual event with a score of 2265 points.
