= Marjory Saunders =

Canadian archer (1913–2010)

Marjory Saunders (March 10, 1913 – November 26, 2010) was a Canadian archer who competed in the Olympic games in 1972 in Munich. She was born in Sussex, England and died in Maple Ridge, British Columbia. She competed in the 1972 Summer Olympics in Women's individual archery competition and placed 32nd.
