= Shue Meei-Shya =

Taiwanese archer

Shue Meei-Shya (Chinese: 薛美霞; pinyin: Xuē Měixiá; born 6 June 1949) is a Taiwanese archer who competed in the 1972 Summer Olympic Games in archery.

== Olympics ==
She finished 38th in the women's individual event with a score of 2026 points.
