= Akiyama clan =

Akiyama 秋山
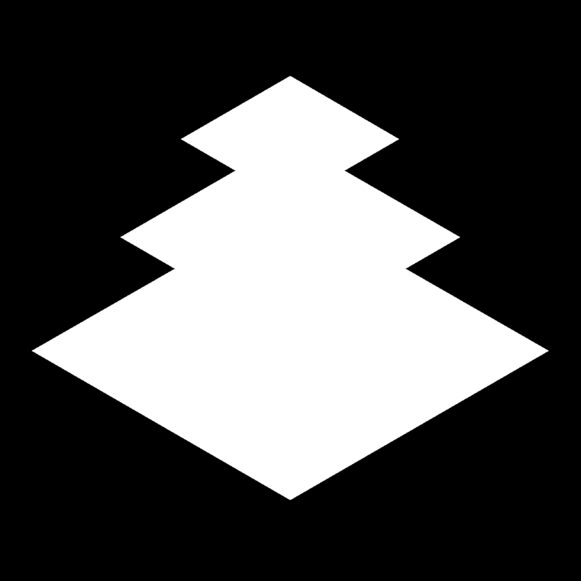
- Mon (emblem) of Akiayama clan
- Home province: Kai
- Parent house: Minamoto clan Takeda clan

Akiyama clan (秋山氏, Akiyama-shi) was a Japanese samurai kin group.

== History ==
In the 16th century, the Akiyama clan were noted relatives of the Takeda clan of Kai province. Due to this relationship the Akiyama served under the Takeda until the year of 1582, at which time the Takeda were completely wiped out through the allied forces of the Oda and Tokugawa clans.

Some of the Akiyama moved from Kai Province to the island of Shikoku.
