= Archery at the 1904 Summer Olympics – Men's double American round =

Men's double American round at the Games of the III Olympiad
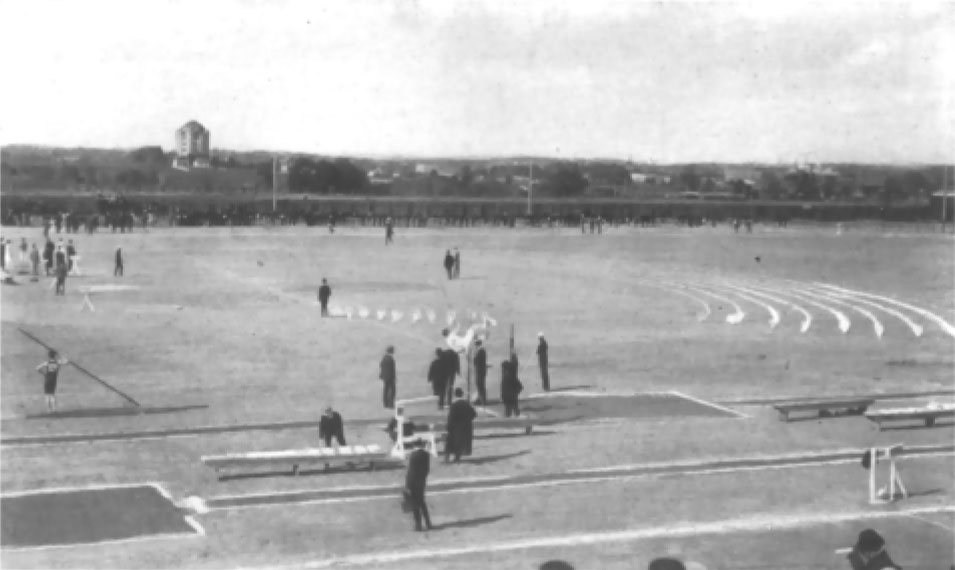
- Contemporary photograph of Francis Field, where the event took place
- Venue: Francis Field
- Date: 19 September
- Competitors: 22 from 1 nation

Medalists
1st place, gold medalist(s)		George Bryant	United States
2nd place, silver medalist(s)		Robert Williams	United States
3rd place, bronze medalist(s)		William Thompson	United States

The men's double American round event was part of the archery programme at the 1904 Summer Olympics. The competition was held on Monday, 19 September 1904. Twenty two archers competed. George Bryant won the competition, with Robert Williams finishing second and William Thompson third. A day later, the same three men in the same order would medal in the other 1904 Olympic archery event, the double York round.

== Background ==
This was the only appearance of the event. The 1904 Olympic archery events were part of the 26th Grand Annual Target Meeting of the National Archery Association, with competition open to international competitors, although none entered this event. Medals were also given out for the best score at each range, but these medals are not recognized as Olympic.

== Competition format ==
An American round consisted of 30 arrows at each of 60, 50, and 40 yard distances. The total number of arrows for the double round was 180. The result was based on points. A total of 10 points were available. One point was awarded to the archer scoring the highest score at each distance as well as one point for the most hits on target at each distance. Two points were awarded to the archer scoring the highest total score as well as two points for the most total targets hit. Ties were broken on total score, and then on total targets hit.

== Schedule ==
The double American round event was held on the first day of the three-day archery tournament, along with the women's double Columbia round.

Legend

F	Final

Event	19 Sep	20 Sep	21 Sep
Men's double American round	F		
Men's double York round		F	
Men's team round			F
Women's double Columbia round	F		
Women's double National round		F	
Women's team round			F

== Results ==
Five men each hit all 60 targets at 40 yards, splitting the point for that category five ways (0.2 each). Bryant had the highest score at that range, with 412. Bryant was the only perfect archer at 50 yards (Williams and Thompson each hit 59 targets) and scored 55 better than the next closest man (366 to Williams's 311) to take both 50-yard points. At 60 yards, Bryant was again the best in targets hit (the only four targets he missed in the entire competition were at this distance), but Williams scored higher with 276 to Bryant's 270 despite hitting only 52 targets to Bryant's 56. Bryant finished comfortably ahead in total score and total hits, adding four more points to give him 8.2 out of the possible 10 and the gold medal. Williams received silver on the strength of his 60-yard score point, with a total of 1.2 including his share of the 40-yard hits point. The three other men who had shared in that 40-yard hits point placed third through fifth, with ties broken by score to give Thompson the bronze medal.

Rank	Archer	Nation	Points	Score
1st place, gold medalist(s)	George Bryant	United States	8.2	1048
2nd place, silver medalist(s)	Robert Williams	United States	1.2	991
3rd place, bronze medalist(s)	William Thompson	United States	0.2	949
4	Charles Woodruff	United States	0.2	907
5	Wallace Bryant	United States	0.2	818
6	William Clark	United States	0	880
7	Benjamin Keys	United States	0	840
8	Cyrus Edwin Dallin	United States	0	816
9	Henry B. Richardson	United States	0	813
10	Homer Taylor	United States	0	811
11	Charles Hubbard	United States	0	779
12	Louis Maxson	United States	0	777
13	Galen Spencer	United States	0	701
14	Samuel Duvall	United States	0	699
15	Edward Frentz	United States	0	665
16	Amos Casselman	United States	0	628
17	Thomas Scott	United States	0	562
18	Ralph Taylor	United States	0	533
19	Edward Bruce	United States	0	516
20	Edward Weston	United States	0	508
21	Edward Weston	United States	0	450
22	William Valentine	United States	0	345
