= Archery at the 1904 Summer Olympics – Men's team round =

Men's team round at the Games of the III Olympiad
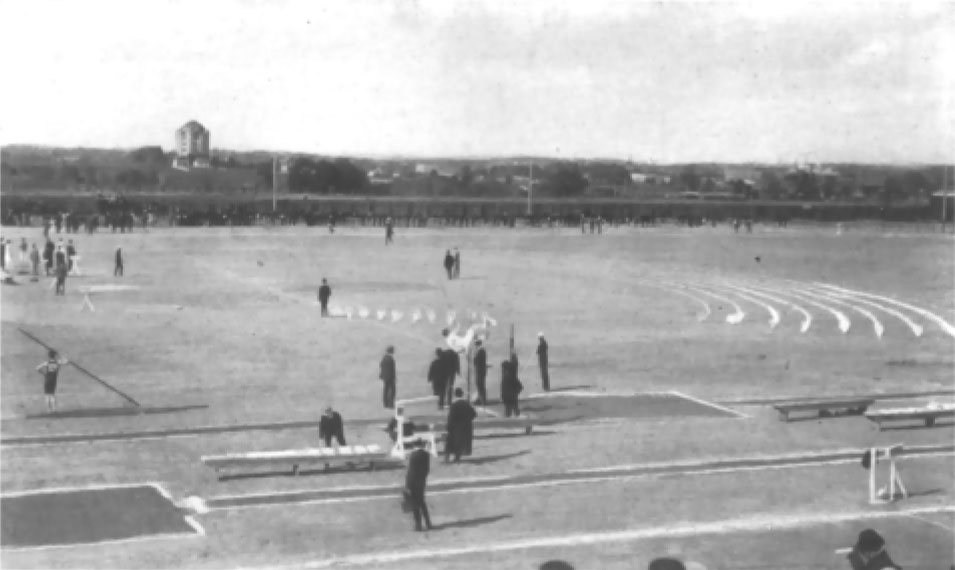
- Contemporary photograph of Francis Field, where the event took place
- Venue: Francis Field
- Date: 21 September
- Competitors: 16 from 1 nation
- Teams: 4

Medalists
1st place, gold medalist(s)		William Thompson; Robert Williams; Louis Maxson; Galen Spencer	United States
2nd place, silver medalist(s)		Charles Woodruff; William Clark; Charles Hubbard; Samuel Duvall	United States
3rd place, bronze medalist(s)		George Bryant; Wallace Bryant; Cyrus Edwin Dallin; Henry B. Richardson	United States

The men's team round event was part of the archery programme at the 1904 Summer Olympics. The competition was held on 21 September 1904 at Francis Field. 16 archers (from the host United States), comprising four teams of four, competed. The event was won by the Potomac Archers (based in Washington, D.C.), with the Cincinnati Archers taking silver, the Boston Archers bronze, and the Chicago Archers fourth place.

== Background ==
This was the first appearance of a men's team event; team events would not return again until 1988 (though in a different format). The 1904 Olympic archery events were part of the 26th Grand Annual Target Meeting of the National Archery Association, with competition open to international competitors, although none entered this event.

The Boston Archers included George Bryant, while the Potomac Archers included Robert Williams and William Thompson; the three men had each won two medals in the individual events earlier on the two prior days (Bryant both gold, Williams both silver, and Thompson both bronze).

== Competition format ==
The competition featured four-man teams, with each archer shooting 96 arrows at 60 yards. The total for the team was thus 384 arrows. All four individual scores were summed to give a team score.

== Schedule ==
The team events—both men and women—were held on the third day of the three-day archery tournament.

Legend

F	Final

Event	19 Sep	20 Sep	21 Sep
Men's double American round	F		
Men's double York round		F	
Men's team round			F
Women's double Columbia round	F		
Women's double National round		F	
Women's team round			F

== Results ==
George Bryant, the winner of the two individual events, was again the best individual archer in this competition, scoring 443. However, there was a significant drop-off between him and the next archer on his Boston team, his brother Wallace (who scored 296). The other two individual medalists, Thompson and Williams, both had solid rounds of 413 and 386 to lead the Potomac Archers to a narrow victory over the Cincinnati Archers, led by Woodruff's 429.

Rank	Team	Archers	Nation	Score
1st place, gold medalist(s)	Potomac Archers	William Thompson; Robert Williams; Louis Maxson; Galen Spencer	United States	1344
2nd place, silver medalist(s)	Cincinnati Archers	Charles Woodruff; William Clark; Charles Hubbard; Samuel Duvall	United States	1341
3rd place, bronze medalist(s)	Boston Archers	George Bryant; Wallace Bryant; Cyrus Edwin Dallin; Henry B. Richardson	United States	1268
4	Chicago Archers	Benjamin Keys; Homer Taylor; Edward Weston; Edward Bruce	United States	942
