= Archery at the 1904 Summer Olympics – Women's double Columbia round =

Women's double Columbia round at the Games of the III Olympiad
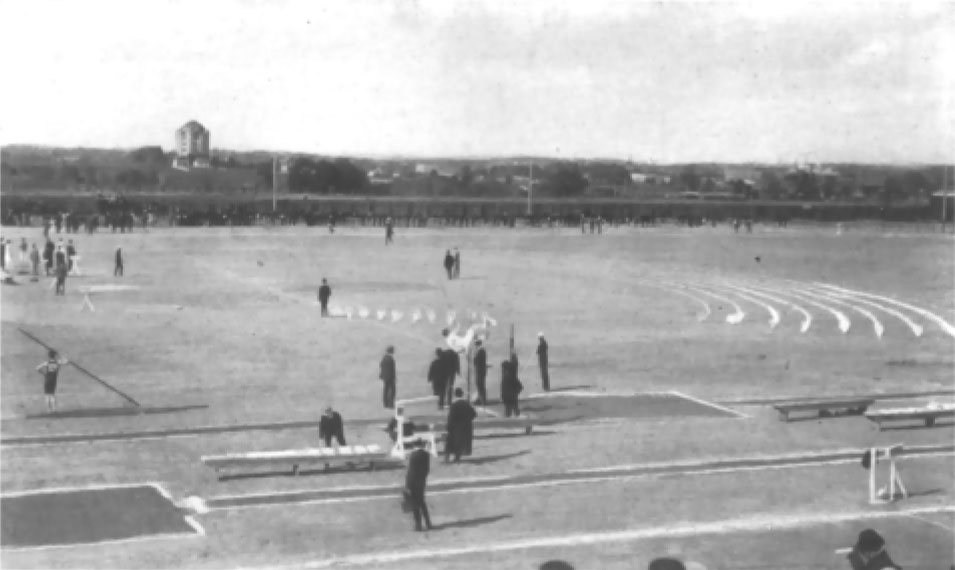
- Contemporary photograph of Francis Field, where the event took place
- Venue: Francis Field
- Date: 19 September
- Competitors: 6 from 1 nation

Medalists
1st place, gold medalist(s)		Matilda Howell	United States
2nd place, silver medalist(s)		Emma Cooke	United States
3rd place, bronze medalist(s)		Jessie Pollock	United States

The women's double Columbia round event was part of the archery programme at the 1904 Summer Olympics. The competition was held on Monday, 19 September 1904. Six archers competed. The event was won by Matilda Howell, the first of her three gold medals in the 1904 archery competitions. Emma Cooke and Jessie Pollock earned silver and bronze, respectively. The three women would finish in the same positions a day later in the double National round event.

== Background ==
This was the only appearance of the event. The 1904 Olympic archery events were part of the 26th Grand Annual Target Meeting of the National Archery Association, with competition open to international competitors, although none entered this event. Medals were also given out for the best score at each range, but these medals are not recognized as Olympic.

Howell was a strong favorite. She won 17 national championships in 20 appearances from 1883 to 1907.

== Competition format ==
A Columbia round consisted of 12 arrows at each of 50, 40, and 30 yard distances. The total number of arrows for the double round was 72. The result was based on points. A total of 10 points were available. One point was awarded to the archer scoring the highest score at each distance as well as one point for the most hit on target at each distance. Two points were awarded to the archer scoring the highest total score as well as two points for the most total targets hit. Ties were broken on total score, and then on total targets hit.

== Schedule ==
The double Columbia round event was held on the first day of the three-day archery tournament, along with the men's double American round.

Legend

F	Final

Event	19 Sep	20 Sep	21 Sep
Men's double American round	F		
Men's double York round		F	
Men's team round			F
Women's double Columbia round	F		
Women's double National round		F	
Women's team round			F

== Results ==
Howell was dominant, with a total score 237 points greater than the other two medalists. She received 9.5 out of the possible 10 points (two for best total score, two for most total hits, one each for best score at each of the three distances, one each for most hits at 30 yards and 40 yards, and 0.5 for tying Cooke for most hits at 30 yards). The other 0.5 point went to Cooke for that 30-yard hits tie, giving her silver. Pollock had the best score of archers with 0 points, earning bronze.

Rank	Archer	Nation	Points	Score
1st place, gold medalist(s)	Matilda Howell	United States	9.5	867
2nd place, silver medalist(s)	Emma Cooke	United States	0.5	630
3rd place, bronze medalist(s)	Eliza Pollock	United States	0	630
4	Emily Woodruff	United States	0	547
5	Mabel Taylor	United States	0	243
6	Leonie Taylor	United States	0	229
