= Archery at the 1904 Summer Olympics – Women's double National round =

Women's double National round at the Games of the III Olympiad
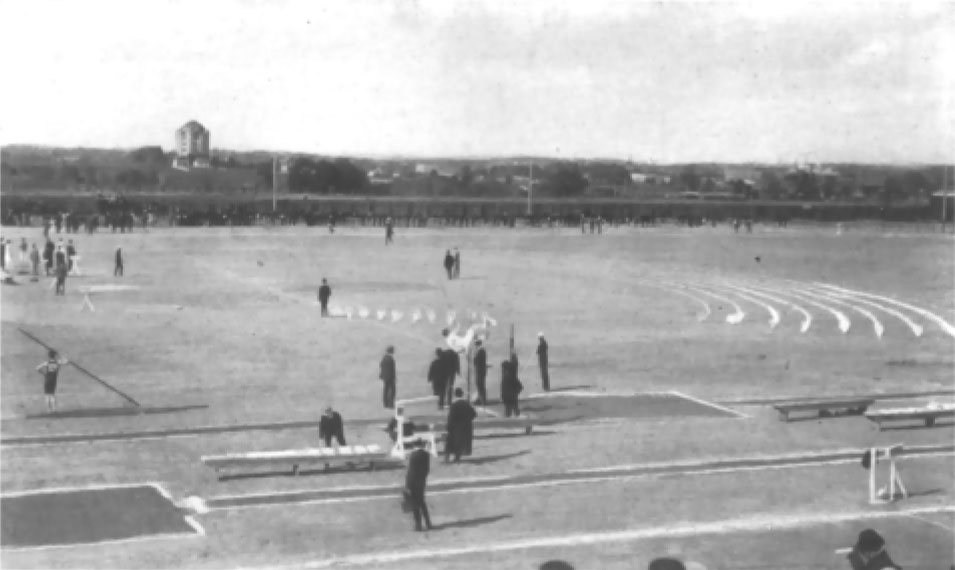
- Contemporary photograph of Francis Field, where the event took place
- Venue: Francis Field
- Date: 20 September
- Competitors: 6 from 1 nation

Medalists
1st place, gold medalist(s)		Matilda Howell	United States
2nd place, silver medalist(s)		Emma Cooke	United States
3rd place, bronze medalist(s)		Jessie Pollock	United States

The women's double National round event was part of the archery programme at the 1904 Summer Olympics. The competition was held on Tuesday, 20 September 1904. Six archers competed. The event was won by Matilda Howell, the second of her three gold medals in the 1904 archery competitions. Emma Cooke and Jessie Pollock earned silver and bronze, respectively. The three women had finished in the same positions a day earlier in the double Columbia round event.

== Background ==
This was the first appearance of the event; it would be held only once more, in 1908. The 1904 Olympic archery events were part of the 26th Grand Annual Target Meeting of the National Archery Association, with competition open to international competitors, although none entered this event. Medals were also given out for the best score at each range, but these medals are not recognized as Olympic.

Howell was a strong favorite. She won 17 national championships in 20 appearances from 1883 to 1907.

== Competition format ==
A National round consisted of 24 arrows at 60 yards and 12 arrows at 50 yards. The total number of arrows for the double round was 72. The result was based on points. A total of eight points were available. One point was awarded to the archer scoring the highest score at each distance as well as one point for the most hit on target at each distance. Two points were awarded to the archer scoring the highest total score as well as two points for the most total targets hit. Ties were broken on total score, and then on total targets hit.

== Schedule ==
The double National round event was held on the second day of the three-day archery tournament, along with the men's double York round.

Legend

F	Final

Event	19 Sep	20 Sep	21 Sep
Men's double American round	F		
Men's double York round		F	
Men's team round			F
Women's double Columbia round	F		
Women's double National round		F	
Women's team round			F

== Results ==
Howell, like the day before in the double Columbia round event, dominated this competition. Her total score was 201 points more than that of the other two medalists. She earned 7.5 of the 8 possible points (two for most total score, two for most total hits, one for best score at 60 yards, one for most hits at 60 yards, one for best score at 50 yards, and 0.5 for tying Cooke for most hits at 50 yards). Cooke earned silver with her 0.5 point from the tie for most hits at 50 yards. Pollock, who had the same score as Cooke for the second straight event, was the best among the 0-point archers and received bronze.

Rank	Archer	Nation	Points	Score
1st place, gold medalist(s)	Matilda Howell	United States	7.5	620
2nd place, silver medalist(s)	Emma Cooke	United States	0.5	419
3rd place, bronze medalist(s)	Eliza Pollock	United States	0	419
4	Emily Woodruff	United States	0	234
5	Mabel Taylor	United States	0	160
6	Leonie Taylor	United States	0	159
