= Archery Hall of Fame =

Coordinates: 37.1817°N 93.2962°W

The Archery Hall of Fame and Museum is located in Springfield, Missouri, on the upper floor of Bass Pro Shop Outdoor World.

== History ==
It was formed in 1971 as a committee of the American Archery Council.

== Inductees ==
1972

- Fred Bear
- Howard Hill
- Ann Weber Hoyt
- Karl E. Palmatier
- Ben Pearson
- Maurice Thompson
- Russ Hoogerhyde

1973

- Robert P. Elmer
- Russ Saxton Pope
- Rube Powell
- Clayton B. Shenk
- Art Young

1974

- Dorothy Smith Cummings
- Harry Eugene Drake
- Doug Easton
- John Yount

1975

- Paul Crouch
- Matilda Howell
- Jean Lee Lombardo

1976

- Babe Bitzenberger
- Dr. Paul Klopsteg
- Louis Carter Smith

1977

- Clarence N. Hickman
- Earl Hoyt Jr. (Obituary)
- Myrtle Miller

1978

- Roy Hoff
- Ann Marston
- Homer Taylor

1979

- Will H. Thompson
- Lura R. Wilson

1980

- Florence Lillie
- George Helwig

1982

- Al Henderson

1984

- Ann Clark

1985

- Robert Rhode
- C. A. Saunders

1986

- Henry Bitzenberger
- Doreen Wilber

1988

- Roy Case

1991

- Glenn St. Charles

1997

- Jim Dougherty
- Jim Easton
- Bob Kelly
- Frank Scott

1998

- William Bill Wadsworth

1999

- Floyd Eccleston
- Tom Jennings
- Dick Lattimer

2000

- Stacy Groscup
- Bob Swinehart

2001

- Larry C. Whiffen

2002

- Norbert Norb Mullaney

2003

- Allan Martin
- M. R. James

2004

- Rollin Bohning

2005

- Charles E. "Bert" Grayson
- Len Cardinale

2006

- Ed Rohde

2007

- William Bednar
- David Samuel
- Ishi

2008

- Chuck Adams
- Julia Body
- George Gardner
- Dave Staples

2010

- Will Compton
- Hollis Wilbur Allen
- Frank Gandy
- G. Fred Asbell

2011

- Gail Martin
- Ann Butz
- Victoria Cook

2012

- Bob Lee

2013

- Aldo Leopold
- Victor Berger

2014

- Clarence "Bud" Fowkes
- Margaret Klann

2015

- Darrell Pace
- Randy Ulmer
- John Williams
- Jack Witt

2016

- Owen Jeffery
- Dick Mauch

2017

- Michelle Ragsdale
- Terry Ragsdale

2018

- Richard Carella
- Bob Markworth
- Pete Shepley

2019

- Robert Eastman
- Dwight Schuh
- The Wilson Boys
