= Archery at the 1904 Summer Olympics – Men's double York round =

Men's double York round at the Games of the III Olympiad
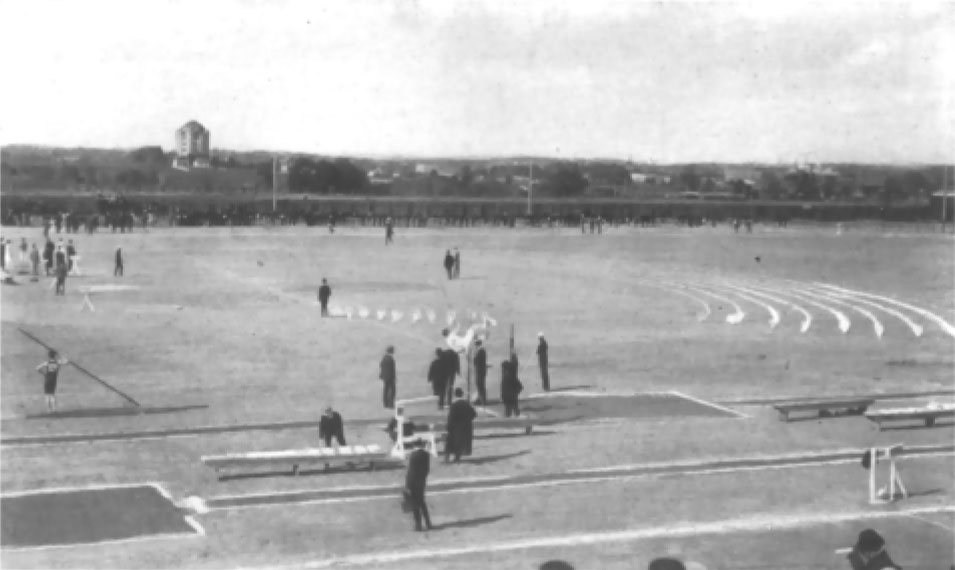
- Contemporary photograph of Francis Field, where the event took place
- Venue: Francis Field
- Date: 20 September 1904
- Competitors: 16 from 1 nation

Medalists
1st place, gold medalist(s)		George Bryant	United States
2nd place, silver medalist(s)		Robert Williams	United States
3rd place, bronze medalist(s)		William Thompson	United States

The men's double York round event was part of the archery programme at the 1904 Summer Olympics. The event was held on 20 September 1904 at Francis Field. There were 16 competitors. George Bryant won the gold medal (completing a double with the double American round event), with Robert Williams taking silver and William Thompson earning bronze.

== Background ==
This was the first appearance of the event; it would be held only once more, in 1908. The 1904 Olympic archery events were part of the 26th Grand Annual Target Meeting of the National Archery Association, with competition open to international competitors, although none entered this event. Medals were also given out for the best score at each range, but these medals are not recognized as Olympic.

== Competition format ==
A York round consisted of 72 arrows shot at 100 yards, 48 arrows shot at 80 yards, and 24 arrows shot at 60 yards. The total number of arrows for a double round was 288. The competition was held on Tuesday, 20 September 1904. Sixteen archers competed.

The result is based on points. A total of 10 points were available. One point was awarded to the archer scoring the highest score at each distance as well as one point for the most hits on target at each distance. Two points were awarded to the archer scoring the highest total score as well as two points for the most total targets hit. Ties were broken on total score, and then on total targets hit.

== Schedule ==
The double York round event was held on the second day of the three-day archery tournament, along with the women's double National round.

Legend

F	Final

Event	19 Sep	20 Sep	21 Sep
Men's double American round	F		
Men's double York round		F	
Men's team round			F
Women's double Columbia round	F		
Women's double National round		F	
Women's team round			F

== Results ==
Bryant had the most total hits and the highest total score, earning four points. He picked up three additional points for the best score at 60 yards (246), best score at 100 yards (281), and most hits at 100 yards (79). Williams earned both of his points at 80 yards, with the most hits (73) and best score (345). Thompson's sole point came from hitting the most targets at 60 yards (48), with two more hits than Bryant at that distance but scoring only 238 to Bryant's 246.

Rank	Archer	Nation	Points	Score
1st place, gold medalist(s)	George Bryant	United States	7	820
2nd place, silver medalist(s)	Robert Williams	United States	2	819
3rd place, bronze medalist(s)	William Thompson	United States	1	816
4	Wallace Bryant	United States	0	618
5	Benjamin Keys	United States	0	532
6	Edward Frentz	United States	0	528
7	Homer Taylor	United States	0	506
8	Charles Woodruff	United States	0	487
9	Henry B. Richardson	United States	0	439
10	Cyrus Edwin Dallin	United States	0	405
11	David McGowan	United States	0	383
12	Louis Maxson	United States	0	382
13	Thomas Scott	United States	0	375
14	Ralph Taylor	United States	0	328
15	Edward Weston	United States	0	268
16	Edward Bruce	United States	0	238
