= United States at the 1950 World Archery Championships =

- Flag of the United States
- National federation: USA Archery

in Copenhagen, Denmark 26 July 1950 – 29 July 1950
- Competitors: 5 (3 men and 2 women) in 3 events
- Medals Ranked 2nd: Gold 1 Silver 1 Bronze 1 Total 3

World Archery Championships appearances
- 1933; 1934–1949; 1950; 1952; 1954; 1955; 1957; 1958; 1959; 1961; 1963; 1965; 1967; 1969; 1971; 1973; 1975; 1977; 1979; 1981; 1983; 1985; 1987; 1989; 1991; 1993; 1995; 1997; 1999; 2001; 2003; 2005; 2007; 2009; 2011; 2013; 2015; 2017; 2019; 2021

The United States competed at the 1950 World Archery Championships in Copenhagen, Denmark from 26 to 30 July 1950 The United States entered a squad of 5 archers and competed in 3 events, the men's and women's individual events, and men's team events. The team one gold with Jean Lee in the women's individual. Russ Reynolds, who was suffering from leukemia won bronze in the men's individual and was presented with the gold medal from the winner Hans Deutgen.

== Individual ==
=== Men ===
| Archer | Event | Distance | | | | | | Total | Rank |
| Archer | Event | 70m | 60m | 50m | 50m | 35m | 25m | Total | Rank |
|---|---|---|---|---|---|---|---|---|---|
| Russ Reynolds | Individual | 678 | 521 | 322 | 444 | 413 | 482 | 2854 | 3rd place, bronze medalist(s) |
| Richards | Individual | 494 | 413 | 288 | 440 | 420 | 439 | 2494 | 29 |
| Lee | Individual | 224 | 250 | 221 | 347 | 376 | 364 | 1782 | 67 |

=== Women ===
| Archer | Event | Distance | | | | | | Total | Rank |
| Archer | Event | 70m | 60m | 50m | 50m | 35m | 25m | Total | Rank |
|---|---|---|---|---|---|---|---|---|---|
| Jean Lee | Individual | 631 | 645 | 516 | 491 | 491 | 414 | 3254 | 1st place, gold medalist(s) |
| Jean Richards | Individual | 579 | 543 | 482 | 444 | 430 | 441 | 2919 | 2nd place, silver medalist(s) |

== Individual ==
=== Men ===
| Archer | Event | Distance | | | | | | Total | Rank |
| Archer | Event | 70m | 60m | 50m | 50m | 35m | 25m | Total | Rank |
|---|---|---|---|---|---|---|---|---|---|
| Russ Reynolds; Richards; Lee | Team | 1390 | 1184 | 831 | 1231 | 1209 | 1285 | 7130 | 8 |
