= Archery at the 1904 Summer Olympics =

Archery at the Games of the III Olympiad
- Venue: Francis Olympic Field
- Dates: 19–21 September 1904
- No. of events: 6 (3 men, 3 women)
- Competitors: 29 from 1 nation

At the 1904 Summer Olympics in St. Louis, six archery events were contested, of which three were men's and three were women's competitions. 23 men and 6 women constituted the field. As was common in early Olympic archery, the events held in 1904 had little resemblance to the previous edition's events (as early Olympic archery was not standardized). The events were formally named the 26th Grand Annual Target Meeting of the National Archery Association. While open to international entrants, no foreign competitors entered (with some archers from the Philippines entering but not competing). Team archery was introduced at these Games, as was women's archery. The medalists were the same for both men's individual events (George Bryant taking gold, Robert Williams silver, and William Thompson bronze in both) and both women's individual events (Matilda Howell gold, Emma Cooke silver, Eliza Pollock bronze). Howell, an early pioneer of women's archery, finished with three gold medals as she was a member of the only women's team to appear in the records.

In addition to the six events currently recognized as Olympic events by the International Olympic Committee, there were also medals awarded for the top scores at each range in the Olympic events, separate flight shooting (longest distance) events, and an "Anthropology Days" event.

== Medal summary ==
Event	Gold	Silver	Bronze
Men's double York round	George Bryant; United States	Robert Williams; United States	William Thompson; United States
Men's double American round	George Bryant; United States	Robert Williams; United States	William Thompson; United States
Men's team round	United States: William Thompson; Robert Williams; Louis Maxson; Galen Spencer	United States: Charles Woodruff; William Clark; Charles Hubbard; Samuel Duvall	United States: George Bryant; Wallace Bryant; Cyrus Edwin Dallin; Henry B. Richardson
Women's double National round	Matilda Howell; United States	Emma Cooke; United States	Eliza Pollock; United States
Women's double Columbia round	Matilda Howell; United States	Emma Cooke; United States	Eliza Pollock; United States
Women's team round	United States: Matilda Howell; Eliza Pollock; Laura Woodruff; Leonie Taylor	None awarded	None awarded

== Schedule ==
Legend

F	Final

Event	19 Sep	20 Sep	21 Sep
Men's double American round	F		
Men's double York round		F	
Men's team round			F
Women's double Columbia round	F		
Women's double National round		F	
Women's team round			F

== Participating nations ==
- United States (29)

== Medal table ==
Rank	Nation	Gold	Silver	Bronze	Total
1	United States	6	5	5	16
Totals (1 entries)		6	5	5	16
