= Charles E. Grayson =

American archer (1910–2009)

Charles Grayson
- Born: July 24, 1910; Iowa
- Died: May 15, 2009 (aged 98); Clatskanie, Oregon
- Occupations: bow hunter & bowyer author, collector
- Known for: Archery

Charles Elbert Grayson (July 24, 1910 – May 17, 2009) was an archer, bowyer, archery collector, and author. His archery collection is contained in the University of Missouri Museum of Anthropology.

== Early life ==
Charles Grayson was born in 1910 on a farm in Iowa, the eighth in a family of nine children. When he was nine years old, the family relocated to Riverside, California. He graduated from Riverside Polytechnic High School in 1928 and from there, went on to attend Pomona College from 1928 to 1933. While attending Pomona College he and a friend, together with a Japanese student, began archery as a sport. This was Grayson's first introduction to formal Japanese archery. After graduation from Pomona, Grayson studied physics at the University of California, Berkeley, but eventually changed his interests to medicine. He graduated from Stanford School of Medicine in 1942 as a radiologist.

== Interest in archery ==
A close neighbor of Grayson's in Riverside, a scoutmaster and archer, was friends with prominent archers such as Art Young, Saxton Pope, and William "Chief" Compton. Grayson made his first bow from a lemonwood stave that he won selling tickets to a movie about Art Young's trek across Alaska.

In private practice in Sacramento, Grayson took up archery again. He became skilled in making various types of bows and became involved in local, regional, and national archery associations. He has won many medals in competition, at one time holding the amateur record for the 65-lb class in flight shooting. Hunting expeditions and professional travel provided opportunities to collect archery-related materials in areas such as Mexico, British Columbia, Alaska, and Africa.

In 1960, Grayson and his wife built a house in Oregon where they retired in 1972. There he added a building to house his vast archery collection and related materials like thumb rings, ivory sculpture, and paintings. He began donating his collection to the University of Missouri Museum of Anthropology in the early 1990s.

== Archery Collection ==
Dr. Grayson collected archery from all over the world. His archery collection spans artifacts from China, Tibet, Thailand, Japan, Korea, Turkey, Iran, India, Pakistan, Mongolia, the Philippines, Africa, North America, South America, as well as more contemporary pieces from Europe (England) as well as the United States. Dr. Grayson also collected bows from Fred Bear and collected many of the record setting flight bows from Harry Drake.

== Academic career ==
In addition to being an avid collector of archery and archery related objects, Dr. Grayson also researched and published on archery topics. Many of his articles appeared in the magazine, Primitive Archer. Shear, for example, discussed the effects of shear in the construction of both self bows and composite bows. He also wrote a variety of articles about archery traditions from around the world such as, Somali Archery, Eskimo Bows, Arrows, and Quivers and Wintu Archery.

Most collectors today have either directly or indirectly benefited from Bert's discoveries and finds. Very few people realize however just how generous and helpful he has been to these other collectors over the years. He has made these contributions anonymously, and without an inflated ego. Hopefully that anonymity will become lost at the museum in Missouri and in his upcoming book. What's more he is the only collector alive who spent more than a year traveling around the world, from continent to continent, collecting and documenting his finds. If history teaches any lessons at all, Bert will be remembered as the one individual in our time who preserved treasures of the past, which would have otherwise been completely lost or forgotten. I am confident future generations will realize the value of his work even more than today

— Jack B. Harrison, Primitive Archer Magazine, Volume 11, Issue 2

Grayson was a member as well as Vice President of the Society of Archer-Antiquaries.

He was an inductee in the Archery Hall of Fame in 2005.
