= Harry Drake (disambiguation) =

Harry Drake was an archer and bowyer.

Harry Drake may also refer to:

- Harry Drake, character in Danger Island (serial)
- Harry Drake, character in The Seven Pearls

== See also ==
- Henry Drake (disambiguation)
