= Archery at the 1904 Summer Olympics – Women's team round =

Women's team round at the Games of the III Olympiad
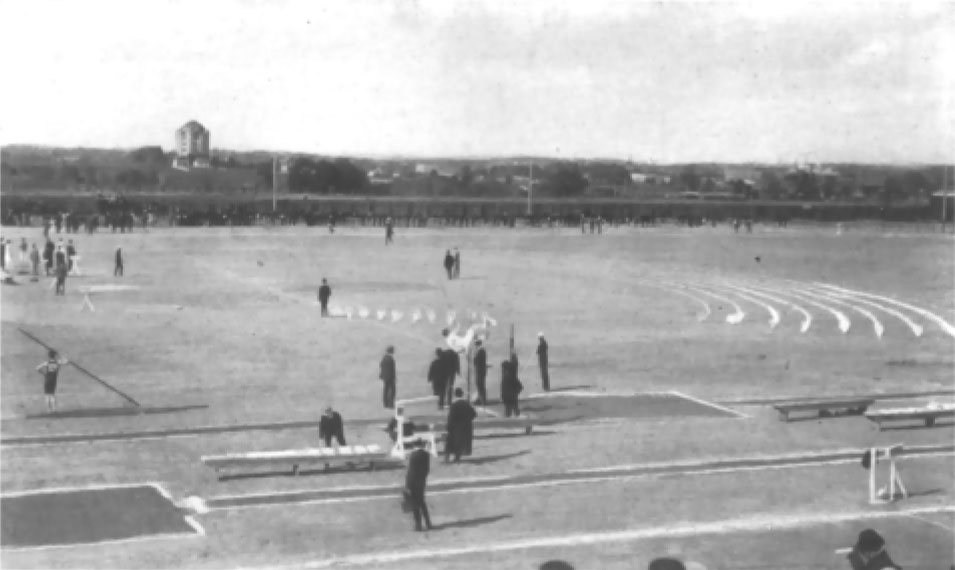
- Contemporary photograph of Francis Field, where the event took place
- Venue: Francis Field
- Date: 21 September
- Competitors: 4 from 1 nation

Medalists
1st place, gold medalist(s)		United States: Matilda Howell; Eliza Pollock; Leonie Taylor; Emily Woodruff

The women's team round event was part of the archery programme at the 1904 Summer Olympics. The competition took place on 21 September 1904 at Francis Field. Only one team, consisting of four archers from the hosts United States, appears to have competed. The International Olympic Committee currently recognizes them as gold medalists based on scholarly research of the contemporary reports.

== Background ==
This was the first appearance of a women's team event; team events would not return again until 1988 (though in a different format). The 1904 Olympic archery events were part of the 26th Grand Annual Target Meeting of the National Archery Association, with competition open to international competitors, although none entered this event. The women's team round in particular has been debated as to whether it was Olympic. Early sources listed it, but later sources excluded it based on it not appearing on the original result sheets and thus assuming it was not actually contested. However, scores are provided in contemporary publications (the 1906 Spalding Archery Guide and 1909 Archer's Register), leading most recent scholars to include it.

== Competition format ==
The competition featured four-woman teams, with each archer shooting 96 arrows at 50 yards, totaling 384 arrows per team. The team score was the sum of all four individual scores.

== Schedule ==
The team events—both women and men—were held on the third day of the three-day archery tournament.

Legend

F	Final

Event	19 Sep	20 Sep	21 Sep
Men's double American round	F		
Men's double York round		F	
Men's team round			F
Women's double Columbia round	F		
Women's double National round		F	
Women's team round			F

== Results ==
Rank	Team	Archers	Nation	Score
1st place, gold medalist(s)	Cincinnati Archers	Matilda Howell; Eliza Pollock; Emily Woodruff; Leonie Taylor	United States	1114
