= 1961 World Archery Championships =

Archery championships

- Location: Oslo, Norway
- Start date: 10 August
- End date: 13 August
- Competitors: 126

The 1961 World Archery Championships was the 21st edition of the event. It was held in Oslo, Norway on 10–13 August 1961 and was organised by World Archery Federation (FITA).

== Medals summary ==
=== Recurve ===
Event	Gold	Silver	Bronze
Men's individual	Joe Thornton; United States	Clayton Sherman; United States	Jorma Sandelin; Finland
Women's individual	Nancy Vonderheide; United States	Laurie Fowler; Great Britain	Bozena Deptova; Czechoslovakia
Men's team	United States; Joe Thornton; Clayton Sherman; W. Bednar	Belgium; Rene Boussu; Henri Verhoeven; Charles Sophie	Finland; Jorma Sandelin; Väinö Skarp; P. Luoto
Women's team	United States; Nancy Vonderheide; Grace Frye; Victoria Cook	United Kingdom; Laurie Fowler; J. Heywood; Shirley Lyons	South Africa; Anita Schlebusch; Margaret Harriman; E. Caknis

== Medals table ==
Rank	Nation	Gold	Silver	Bronze	Total
1	United States	4	1	0	5
2	Great Britain	0	2	0	2
3	Belgium	0	1	0	1
4	Finland	0	0	2	2
5	Czechoslovakia	0	0	1	1
5	South Africa	0	0	1	1
Totals (6 entries)		4	4	4	12
