= Carter Smith =

Carter Smith may refer to:

- Carter Smith (filmmaker) (born 1971), American filmmaker
- Carter Smith (quarterback), American football quarterback
- Carter Smith (offensive tackle) (born 2004), American football offensive tackle
- Louis Carter Smith (1870–1961), American archery champion and historian
- Mary Carter Smith (1919–2007), American educator
