= United States at the 1933 World Archery Championships =

- Flag of the United States
- National federation: USA Archery

in London, Great Britain 31 July 1933 – 5 August 1933
- Competitors: 1 (1 man and 0 women) in 1 event
- Medals Ranked 3rd: Gold 1 Silver 0 Bronze 0 Total 1

World Archery Championships appearances
- 1933; 1934–1949; 1950; 1952; 1954; 1955; 1957; 1958; 1959; 1961; 1963; 1965; 1967; 1969; 1971; 1973; 1975; 1977; 1979; 1981; 1983; 1985; 1987; 1989; 1991; 1993; 1995; 1997; 1999; 2001; 2003; 2005; 2007; 2009; 2011; 2013; 2015; 2017; 2019; 2021

The United States competed at the 1933 World Archery Championships in London, Great Britain from 31 July to 5 August 1933.

The United States entered 1 archer and competed in the men's individual events, with Donald MacKenzie winning gold.

== Events ==
=== Recurve ===
Archer	Event	Score	Rank
Donald MacKenzie	Individual recurve	1126	1st place, gold medalist(s)
