= Ben Pearson (bowyer) =

American archer, bowyer, and fletcher

Ben Pearson (November 16, 1898 – March 2, 1971) was an American archer, bowyer, and fletcher from Pine Bluff, Arkansas. He is most notable for starting the first company in the United States to mass-produce archery sets and equipment. In 1972, he was among the first inducted into the Archery Hall of Fame.

== Biography ==
Ben Pearson was born November 16, 1898, in Paron, Arkansas. He made his first bow based on articles for Boy Scouts by Dan Beard. In 1926, Pearson entered the state championships using his own equipment; finishing second to last. He made new equipment, and in 1927. he became the Arkansas State Champion. Pearson continued in competitive archery, and by 1938, he placed seventh in the NAA National Tournament, just behind future employee Pat Chambers, and 24 places above Fred Bear.

Prior to 1938, Pearson marketed his arrows through pamphlets, resulting in the first full Ben Pearson Inc. catalog being listed as "No. 12". That first catalog also only listed arrows, with bows added in the 1939 catalog.

By the early 1950s, Ben Pearson Inc. was known for its affordable archery equipment. To make more people aware of the higher end custom bows and arrows, Pearson was still crafting to special order; the 1958 Catalog introduced higher-end bows with names rather than just model numbers.

In 1963, Ben Pearson Inc. was selling 3,000 bows and 3–4,000 arrows per day. In 1967 the company was acquired by Leisure Group, which dropped the highest-end bows from production. In 1972, Leisure Group sold Ben Pearson Archery to the Brunswick Corporation. By the company's 50th anniversary (1988) it had 350 employees and $100 million in payroll. That year, the company presented Governor Bill Clinton with the six millionth bow, and 200 millionth arrow manufactured.

Pearson died on March 2, 1971.
