= Robert Williams (archer) =

American archer (1841–1914)

Medal record

Men's archery

Representing the United States

Olympic Games
Gold medal – first place	1904 St. Louis	Team round
Silver medal – second place	1904 St. Louis	Double York round
Silver medal – second place	1904 St. Louis	Double American round

Robert W. Williams Jr. (January 24, 1841 in Chambersburg, Pennsylvania – December 10, 1914 in Washington, D.C.) was an American archer who competed in the early twentieth century. He won two silver medals in Archery at the 1904 Summer Olympics in Missouri in the double york and American rounds. In the team competition he won the gold medal.

Williams is one of several U.S. Olympic competitors to have fought in the American Civil War and competed in archery in the 1904 Olympics, along with Confederate veteran Will H Thompson of the 4th Georgia Infantry and Union veteran William A Clark of the 48th Ohio. Williams served in the 54th Ohio Infantry Regiment as a colonel.
