= Henry B. Richardson =

American archer (1889–1963)

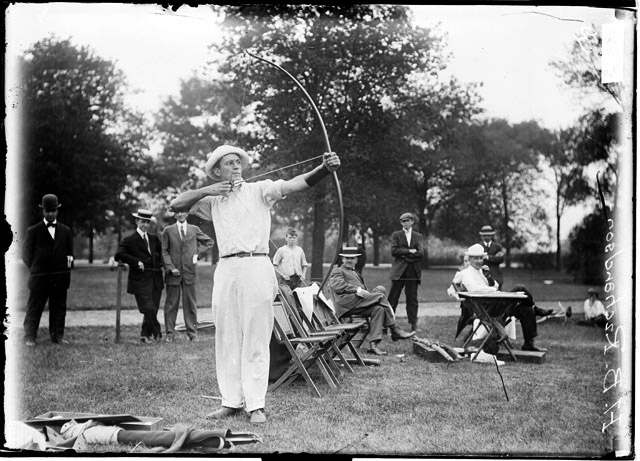
- Richardson competing

Medal record

Men's Archery

Representing the United States

Olympic Games
Bronze medal – third place	1904 St Louis	Team round
Bronze medal – third place	1908 London	Double York round

Henry Barber Richardson (May 19, 1889 in Boston, Massachusetts – November 19, 1963 in New York, New York) was an American archer. He won two Olympic bronze medals. Richardson was the first archer to win medals at two different editions of the Olympic Games as well as the youngest medallist at the 1904 Summer Olympics at the age of 15 years and 124 days.

== 1904 Summer Olympics ==
Richardson's first medal was in the team event at the 1904 Summer Olympics in St. Louis, Missouri. 15 years old at the time, he was a member of the Boston Archers team that finished third of four teams in the event with a total of 1268 points. Richardson also placed 9th in the double York round with 439 points and 10th in the double American round with 813 points.

== 1908 Summer Olympics ==
Four years later, at 19 years of age, he won his second bronze medal, this time in the men's double York round at the 1908 Summer Olympics. Richardson's first round was solid, but not spectacular. His score of 343 put him in 5th place, 60 points behind the leader William Dod. In the second half of the competition, however, Richardson shone. He took honors for the best round of the tournament, with 417 points (only 22 points fewer than his two-round sum 4 years previously), despite gaining little ground against Dod, who shot a 412. Richardson trailed Reginald Brooks-King by only 1 point with 3 arrows left, before finally finishing in third with 760 points to Dod's 815 and Brooks-King's 768.

He also entered the Continental style event, placing 15th with 171 points.

He would later graduate from Harvard University and Harvard Medical School.
