= Ann Weber Hoyt =

American archer (1922–2008)

- Born: 1922
- Died: April 5, 2008 (aged 85–86); Glendale, Ohio
- Known for: Archery

Ann Weber Hoyt (1922 – April 5, 2008) was an American archer. She won six American national archery championships and the 1949 International Field Archery Championship. She also won four intercollegiate archery titles while attending Montclari State Teachers College.

== Life ==
She was married in 1948 to archer Lloyd Corby, and he died in 1958. She remarried in 1971 to Earl Hoyt, owner of Hoyt Archery. In 1972, when the Archery Hall of Fame was established, Hoyt was part of the first group of seven individuals, and the only woman, to be inducted. She died in 2008 in Glendale, Ohio.
