= Dorothy Smith Cummings =

American archer (1903–1995)

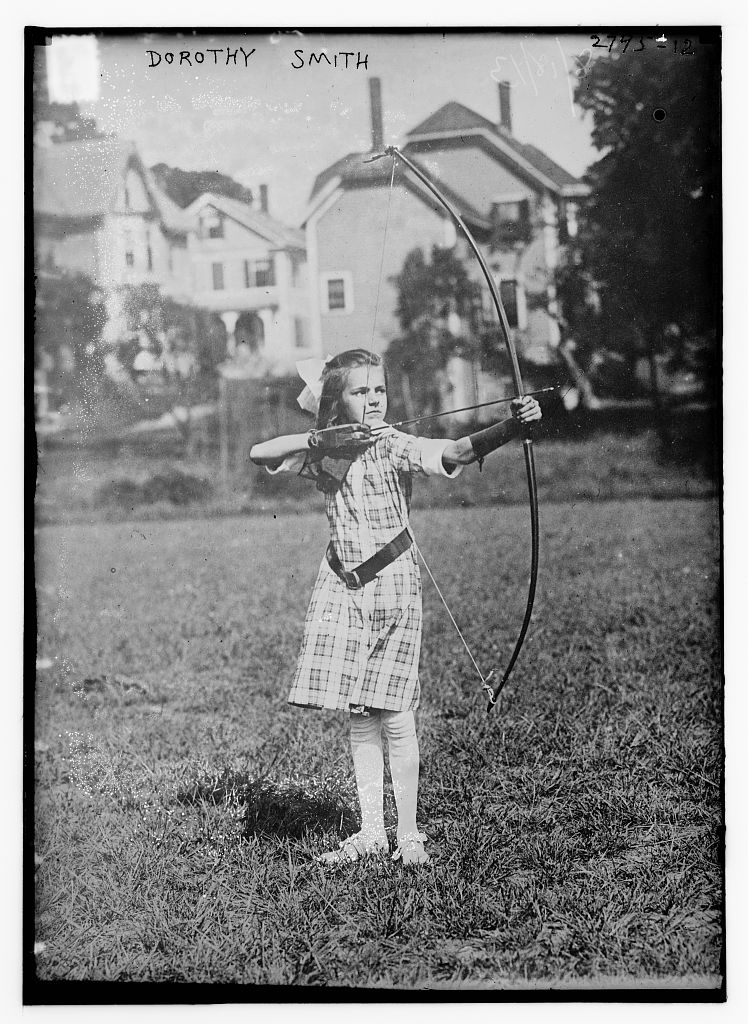
Dorothy Smith in 1913

Dorothy Smith Cummings (March 28, 1903 – September 17, 1995) was a seven time national women's target archery champion. She won her first title in 1919, when she was 16 years old. She won the gold medal six more times in the United States Championships in 1921, 1922, 1924, 1925, 1926 and 1931.

== Biography ==
She was born on March 28, 1903, to Louis Carter Smith. She was inducted into the Archery Hall of Fame in 1974.
