= Henry Drake =

Henry Drake may refer to:

- Henry Drake, character in Blackout Effect
- Hattie O. and Henry Drake Octagon House

== See also ==
- Harry Drake (disambiguation)
