= Russ Hoogerhyde =

American archer (1906–1985)

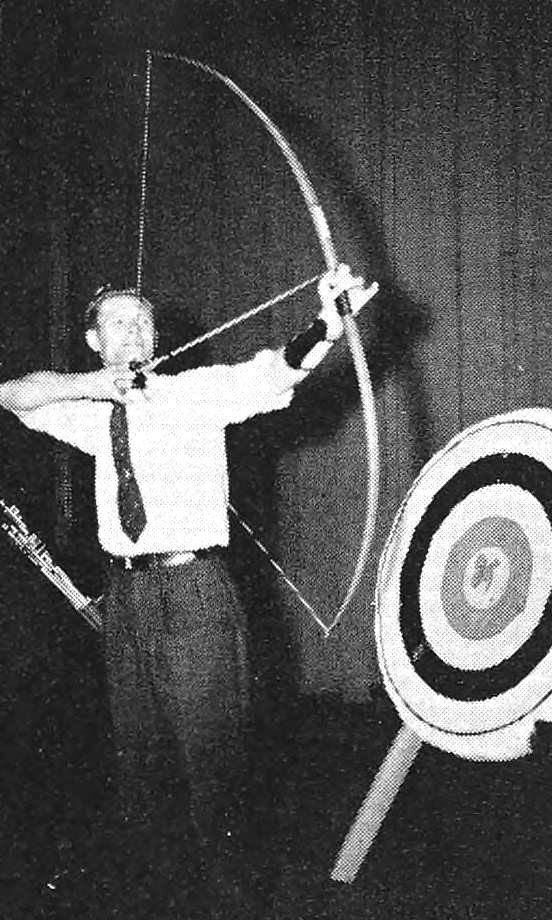
- Born: February 28, 1906; Grand Rapids, Michigan, US
- Died: August 20, 1985 (aged 79); Cook County, Illinois, US
- Known for: Archery

Russell B. Hoogerhyde (February 26, 1906 – August 20, 1985) was an American archer. He won six American national archery championships from 1930 to 1940 and was one of the initial inductees into the Archery Hall of Fame in 1972.

== Early years ==
Hoogerhyde was born in 1906 in Grand Rapids, Michigan. In the 1920s, an archery range opened on the site of a former billiards hall in Grand Rapids. Hoogerhyde was 15 years old when the archery range opened. He took to the sport, dropping out of high school at age 17 to manage the range. The owner of the range also operated a plant where Hoogerhyde worked making bows and arrows. In 1930, the owner encouraged him to compete in the national archery tournament in Chicago and provided the equipment needed for the competition.

== Archery career ==
At age 24 in August 1930, Hoogerhyde won his first national championship at the 50th annual National Archery Association (NAA) tournament at Grant Park in Chicago. He defeated the second-place finisher by 167 points to become the first person from the Midwest to win the national championship.

Hoogerhyde repeated as national champion and established a new world record at the 1931 NAA tournament at Canandaigua, New York. He shot three perfect ends, placed 15 consecutive arrows in the gold, and defeated his closest competitor by 214 points.

He won his third consecutive national championship at the 1932 NAA tournament in Pinehurst, North Carolina. He tallied 1,372 points, breaking his world record off 1,353 set the previous year.

In August 1933, Hoogerhyde lost the national championship by six points to 17-year-old Ralph Miller from Seattle. After winning three consecutive national, Missouri Valley, and Midwestern championships, it was the first time Hoogerhyde had lost an archery tournament.

Hoogerhyde regained the national championship in August 1934 at the NAA tournament held in Storrs, Connecticut. Using a lemonwood bow, he defeated Ralph Miller by 135 points and set a new record with the best total ever in a national archery tournament.

External videos
- Artful Archery (1937), education film in which Hoogerhyde demonstrates various trick shots (51 seconds onward)

Hoogerhyde retired from competition in the mid-1930s to pursue a business career. In 1937, he made a comeback and won his fifth national championship at the NAA tournament in Lancaster, Pennsylvania.

In 1939, Hoogerhyde won the 100-yard target event at the Great American Open archery tournament in Northbrook, Illinois.

In 1940, Hoogerhyde won his fourth and final national championship at the NAA tournament held in Amherst, Massachusetts. Hoogerhyde retired from competition in 1940.

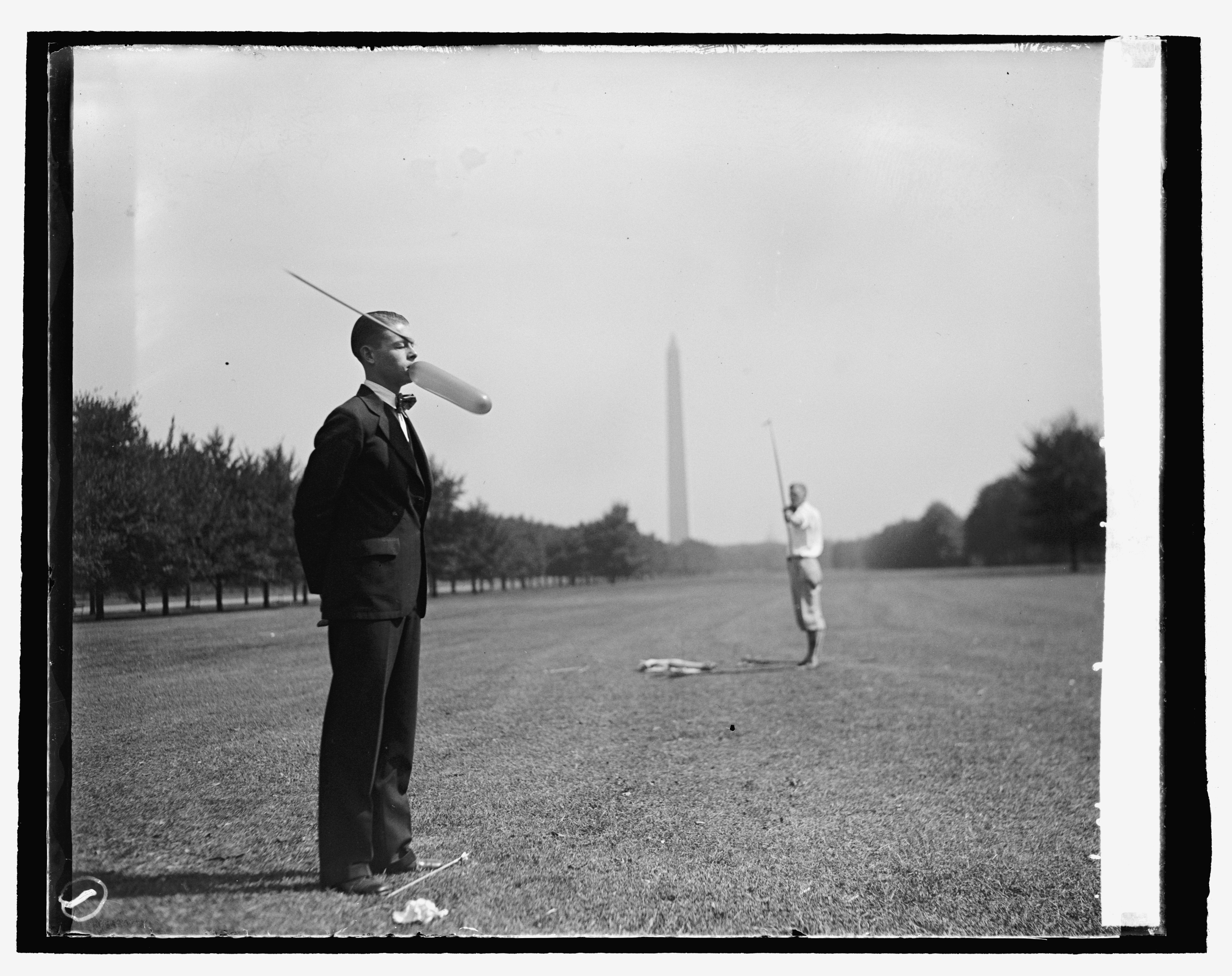
Hoogerhyde shooting a balloon from Clyde Wentworth's mouth

Hoogerhyde also performed exhibitions of trick shots. His tricks included shooting a cigarette from the lips of a spectator, shooting with his bow held from a backward bend, and "a William Tell feat of shooting a balloon from the head of a student." He drew a crowd of 18,000 to an exhibition in Milwaukee in 1938. In 1977, Hoogerhyde recalled that he performed these exhhibitions without insurance: "I never had 5 cent worth of insurance. Today I just die thinking about it... I never thought about it then because I never missed."

== Later years ==
After retiring from competition, Hoogerhyde worked for several manufacturers of archery equipment. He also operated an archery business in Northbrook, Illinois, selling archery equipment and supplies and offering instruction in the sport.

In 1972, when the Archery Hall of Fame was established, Hoogerhyde was part of the first group of seven individuals to be inducted. He died in 1985 in Cook County, Illinois.
