= Ralph Taylor (archer) =

American archer

Personal information
- Full name: Ralph Buren Taylor
- Born: January 26, 1874 Plain Township, Franklin County, Ohio, U.S.
- Died: February 23, 1958 (aged 84) Columbus, Ohio, U.S.

Sport
- Sport: Archery
- Club: Cincinnati Archers

Ralph Buren Taylor (January 26, 1874 – February 23, 1958) was an American archer. He competed in the men's double York round and the men's double American round at the 1904 Summer Olympics.
