= Edward Bruce (archer) =

American archer

Personal information
- Full name: Edward Malcolm Bruce
- Born: May 10, 1861 Aurora, Illinois, U.S.
- Died: September 9, 1919 (aged 58) Chicago, Illinois, U.S.

Sport
- Sport: Archery
- Club: Chicago Archers

Edward Malcolm Bruce (May 10, 1861 – September 9, 1919) was an American archer. He competed in the men's double York round, men's double American round, and the men's team round at the 1904 Summer Olympics.

He died in Chicago on September 9, 1919.
