= Victoria Cook =

American archer (1933–2019)

Medal record

Women's Archery

Representing United States

World Championships
Gold medal – first place	1961 Oslo	Team
Gold medal – first place	1963 Helsinki	Individual
Gold medal – first place	1963 Helsinki	Team
Silver medal – second place	1967 Amersfoort	Team
Bronze medal – third place	1971 York	Team

Victoria Cook (born 1933, died April 18, 2019, from Minneapolis, Minnesota, United States) was a World Champion archer who represented the United States.

== Career ==
Cook took up archery in 1959 following an illness, and the subsequent doctor's recommendation of fresh air. Within three months she won the Minnesota state championship, and was then selected to represent the United States at the 1961 World Archery Championships, where she was part of the gold-medal winning women's team. She continued to shoot, despite recurring illness and surgery, and reached her greatest achievement in defeating fellow American and world champion Nancy Vonderheide to win the 1963 World Championships, which she had paid her own way to attend. She added the US national championship in 1964, and represented the US at world championships until 1971.

Cook was inducted into the Archery Hall of Fame in 2011.
