= Thomas Scott (archer) =

American archer

Personal information
- Full name: Thomas Foster Scott
- Born: January 3, 1833 Warren, Ohio, U.S.
- Died: June 23, 1911 (aged 78) Norwood, Ohio, U.S.
- Children: Lida Howell

Sport
- Sport: Archery
- Club: Cincinnati Archers

Thomas Foster Scott (January 3, 1833 – June 23, 1911) was an American archer who competed at the 1904 Summer Olympics. Born in Warren, Ohio, Scott competed in the men's double American round and the men's double York round, but did not win any medals. Scott, who competed in the events at the age of 71 years and 260 days, was the oldest person to compete in an archery event at the Olympics. He died six years later, in Norwood, Ohio. Scott's daughter, Matilda Howell, was also an Olympic archer who won three gold medals.

== Biography and career ==
He was born Thomas Foster Scott in Warren, Ohio on January 3, 1833. Later, Scott appeared as a competitor for the United States at the 1904 Summer Olympics, representing the Cincinnati Archers and competing in both the men's double York round and the men's double American round. The events were both held on September 19, 1904. In the men's double American round, Scott was one of 22 competitors. He ranked in seventeenth place with a score of 562, hitting 135 targets across three phases, 40 yards, 50 yards, and 60 yards. The men's double York round, where Scott was one of sixteen competitors, saw him rank in thirteenth place, having accumulated a score of 375, having managed to hit 99 targets again across three phases, this time 60 yards, 80 yards, and 100 yards.

Scott became the oldest archer to appear in the Olympics, participating at the age of 71 years, 260 days. As of 2013, he is still the oldest. He had a daughter, Matilda Howell, born in 1859. Howell was also an archer and also competed in the 1904 Summer Olympics, where she won three gold medals. Scott died in Norwood, Ohio, on June 23, 1911, six years after his Olympic appearance.
