= Phil Bryant (archer) =

American archer (1878–1938)

George Bryant
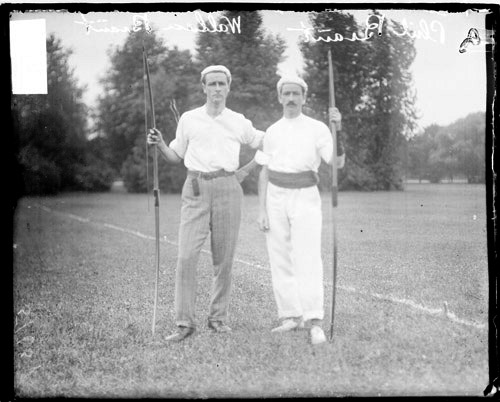
- George Phillip Bryant (right) with Wallace Bryant

Medal record

Men's archery

Representing the United States

Olympic Games
Gold medal – first place	1904 St. Louis	Double York round
Gold medal – first place	1904 St. Louis	Double American round
Bronze medal – third place	1904 St. Louis	Team round

George Philip "Phil" Bryant (February 22, 1878 – April 18, 1938) was an American archer who competed in the 1904 Summer Olympics. He won two gold medals in Archery at the 1904 Summer Olympics in the double York and American rounds. In the team competition he won the bronze medal as part of the Boston Archery Club team. Bryant had not won any major titles before the Olympics, but later won national championships in 1905, 1909, 1911, and 1912.

Bryant was born in Melrose, Massachusetts. He graduated from Harvard University and Harvard Law School. He practiced law, was an executive with the Brant Rock Water Company, and served on the board of selectmen for Marshfield, Massachusetts. Bryant's wife Edith won the national handicap round at the 1912 national championship. His brother, Wallace Bryant, was also an Olympic archer and was on the bronze-medal team with him, before becoming a portrait artist.
