= Robert P. Elmer =

- Born: 1877
- Died: 1951 (aged 73–74); Philadelphia
- Known for: Archery

Robert Potter Elmer (1877 – 1951) was an American archer, author, and medical doctor.

Elmer was the leading American archer of his day. He won seven American national archery championships in 1911, 1914, 1915, 1916, 1919, 1920, and 1922. He also served as the president of the National Archery Association (NAA) from 1914 to 1920. He received the NAA's Thompson Medal of Honor in 1948.

Elmer was also a recognized expert on archery. He wrote extensively about archery, including the books "American Archery" (1917), "Archery" (1926), "The Book of the Long Bow" (1929), "Arab Archery" (Elmer & Faris, 1945), and "Target Archery" (1952). He also wrote the chapter on archery for the Encyclopædia Britannica and the definitions of archery terms for Webster's Dictionary. He also gave instruction on archery to students including Franklin D. Roosevelt and Douglas Fairbanks. In 1973, he was inducted into the Archery Hall of Fame.

Elmer received his undergraduate degree from Princeton University and a medical degree from the University of Pennsylvania Medical School. He practiced medicine as a doctor for 47 years. He died in 1951 at age 73. His collection of archery papers, including coorespondence, photographs, and scrapbooks, are held at the Princeton University Library, Manuscripts Division.
