= Eliza Pollock =

American archer (1840–1919)

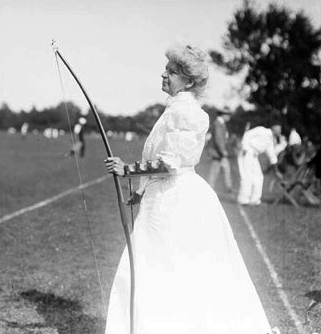

Medal record

Women's archery

Representing the United States

Olympic Games
Gold medal – first place	1904 St. Louis	Team round
Bronze medal – third place	1904 St. Louis	Double National round
Bronze medal – third place	1904 St. Louis	Double Columbia round

Lida Peyton "Eliza" Pollock (October 24, 1840 – May 25, 1919) was an American archer who competed in the early twentieth century. She won two bronze medals in Archery at the 1904 Summer Olympics in Missouri in the double national and Columbia rounds and a gold medal with the US team. She was born in Hamilton, Ohio and died in Wyoming, Ohio. She is the oldest woman ever to win an Olympic Gold. She was aged 63 years and 333 days when she won gold.
