= Mabel Taylor =

American archer

Personal information
- Full name: Mabel Caroline Taylor Brummel
- Born: December 7, 1879 Cincinnati, Ohio, U.S.
- Died: July 1, 1967 (aged 87) Chicago, Illinois, U.S.

Sport
- Sport: Archery
- Club: Cincinnati Archers

Mabel Caroline Taylor Brummel (December 7, 1879 – July 1, 1967) was an American archer. She took part in the women's double National round and the women's double Columbia round at the 1904 Summer Olympics. Her sister was Leonie Taylor who competed against her at the same games.
