= Nanna Matthews Bryant =

American artist

- Born: Anne Bolton Matthews; 1871
- Died: 1933 (aged 61–62)
- Education: Académie Julian
- Known for: Painting, sculpting

Annie (Nanna) Bolton Matthews Bryant (1871 – 1933) was an American artist.

== Career ==
Bryant was a member of a Boston Brahmin family, the daughter of William A. Matthews, Jr. and Annie Bolton (Fay) Matthews. She lived at 9 Exeter Street in Boston's Back Bay, traveling frequently to Europe. She studied at the Académie Julian in Paris. There she focused on painting and met Wallace Bryant, whom she would marry in 1898. The two separated around 1917. Nanna began studying sculpting under Frederick Warren Allen at that point.

Bryant was awarded the Sterling Memorial Sculpture prize in 1931. Bryant was a member of the Copley Society of Art, the National Association of Women Artists and the Newport Art Association.
