= Amos Casselman =

American archer

Personal information
- Full name: Amos Burr Casselman
- Born: November 14, 1850 Canton, Ohio, U.S.
- Died: November 30, 1929 (aged 79) Washington, D.C., U.S.

Sport
- Sport: Archery
- Club: Potomac Archers

Amos Burr Casselman (November 14, 1850 – November 30, 1929) was an American archer. He competed in the men's double American round at the 1904 Summer Olympics in St. Louis, Missouri.
