= Edward Burbank Weston =

American archer

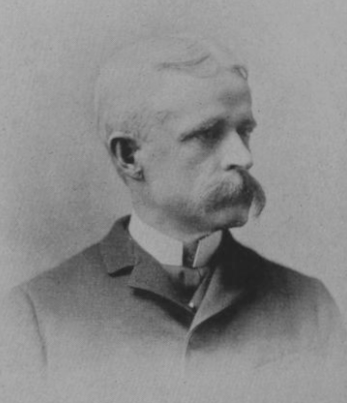

Personal information
- Full name: Edward Burbank Weston
- Born: July 31, 1846 Auburn, Maine, U.S.
- Died: September 14, 1918 (aged 72) Chicago, Illinois, U.s.

Sport
- Sport: Archery
- Club: Chicago Archers

Edward Burbank Weston, MD (July 31, 1846 – September 14, 1918) was an American archer and medical doctor, practicing obstetrics and gynecology in the Chicago suburb of Highland Park.

== Biography ==
Edward Burbank Weston was born in Auburn, Maine on July 31, 1846.

He competed in the men's double York round, men's double American round, and the men's team round at the 1904 Summer Olympics. His son, Edward Henry Weston, also competed in the same event.

He died in Chicago on September 14, 1918.
