= Homer Taylor =

American archer

Personal information
- Full name: Homer Slate Taylor
- Born: August 19, 1851 Leyden, Massachusetts, U.S.
- Died: January 7, 1933 (aged 81) Greenfield, Massachusetts, U.S.

Sport
- Sport: Archery
- Club: Chicago Archers

Homer Slate Taylor (August 19, 1851 – January 7, 1933) was an American archer. He competed in the men's double York round, men's double American round, and the men's team round at the 1904 Summer Olympics.

He is a member of the Archery Hall of Fame.
