= Nancy Vonderheide =

American archer

Medal record

Women's Archery

Representing United States

World Championships
Gold medal – first place	1961 Oslo	Individual
Gold medal – first place	1961 Oslo	Team
Gold medal – first place	1963 Helsinki	Team
Silver medal – second place	1963 Helsinki	Individual

Nancy Vonderheide (born c.1939 in Cincinnati, Ohio, United States), later Nancy Kleinman, was a World Champion archer who represented the United States.

== Career ==
Vonderheide took up archery in 1959 after starting to date Marvin Kleinman, a partner at the legal firm she was working at, who was a keen archer. Within two years, she won the World Championships in Oslo as an unknown; she also set two new world records at the event. She went on to carry out a record-breaking 16 competition unbeaten streak, before being upset at the 1963 Championships by compatriot Victoria Cook. She was not selected for the United States team for any future Championships.

Nancy Kleinman died on March 11, 2017, after a long illness.
