= Benjamin Keys =

American archer

Personal information
- Born: November 22, 1853 Cincinnati, Ohio, U.S.
- Died: June 7, 1911 (aged 57) Chicago, Illinois, U.S.

Sport
- Sport: Archery
- Club: Chicago Archers

Benjamin F. Keys (November 22, 1853 – June 7, 1911) was an American archer. He competed in the men's double York round, men's double American round, and the men's team round at the 1904 Summer Olympics.
