= 1963 World Archery Championships =

Archery championships

- Location: Helsinki, Finland
- Start date: 24 July
- End date: 27 July
- Competitors: 113

The 1963 World Archery Championships was the 22nd edition of the event. It was held in Helsinki, Finland on 24–27 July 1963 and was organised by World Archery Federation (FITA).

For the third competition running, the United States achieved a clean sweep of the gold medals, although Victoria Cook's victory in the women's competition ahead of Nancy Vonderheide was considered a shock.

== Medals summary ==
=== Recurve ===
Event	Gold	Silver	Bronze
Men's individual	Charles Sandlin; United States	Joe Thornton; United States	David Keaggy Jr. United States
Women's individual	Victoria Cook; United States	Nancy Vonderheide; United States	Marjatta Niemi; Finland
Men's team	United States	France	Sweden
Women's team	United States	Finland	United Kingdom

== Medals table ==
Rank	Nation	Gold	Silver	Bronze	Total
1	United States	4	2	1	7
2	Finland	0	1	1	2
3	France	0	1	0	1
4	Great Britain	0	0	1	1
4	Sweden	0	0	1	1
Totals (5 entries)		4	4	4	12
