= Edward Frentz =

American archer

Personal information
- Full name: Edward Williston Frentz
- Born: May 1863 Maine, U.S.
- Died: August 28, 1943 (aged 80) Melrose, Massachusetts, U.S.

Sport
- Sport: Archery
- Club: Boston Archery Club

Edward Williston Frentz (May 1863 – August 28, 1943) was an American archer and author. He competed in the men's double York round and the men's double American round at the 1904 Summer Olympics. He was also a children's book author and antiquarian, writing the short story collection Uncle Zeb and His Friends, as well as several books on archery.
