= Emma Cooke =

American archer (1848–1929)

Personal information
- Born: September 7, 1848 Fayetteville, Pennsylvania, U.S.
- Died: January 22, 1929 (aged 80) Washington, D.C., U.S.

Sport
- Sport: Archery
- Club: Potomac Archers
Medal record
Women's archery
Representing the United States
Olympic Games
Silver medal – second place	1904 St. Louis	Double National round
Silver medal – second place	1904 St. Louis	Double Columbia round

Emma C. Cooke (September 7, 1848 – January 22, 1929) was an American archer who competed in the early twentieth century. She was born in Fayetteville, Pennsylvania. Cooke won two silver medals in Archery at the 1904 Summer Olympics in Missouri in the double national and Columbia rounds behind Matilda Howell.
