= Louis Carter Smith =

American archer and historian

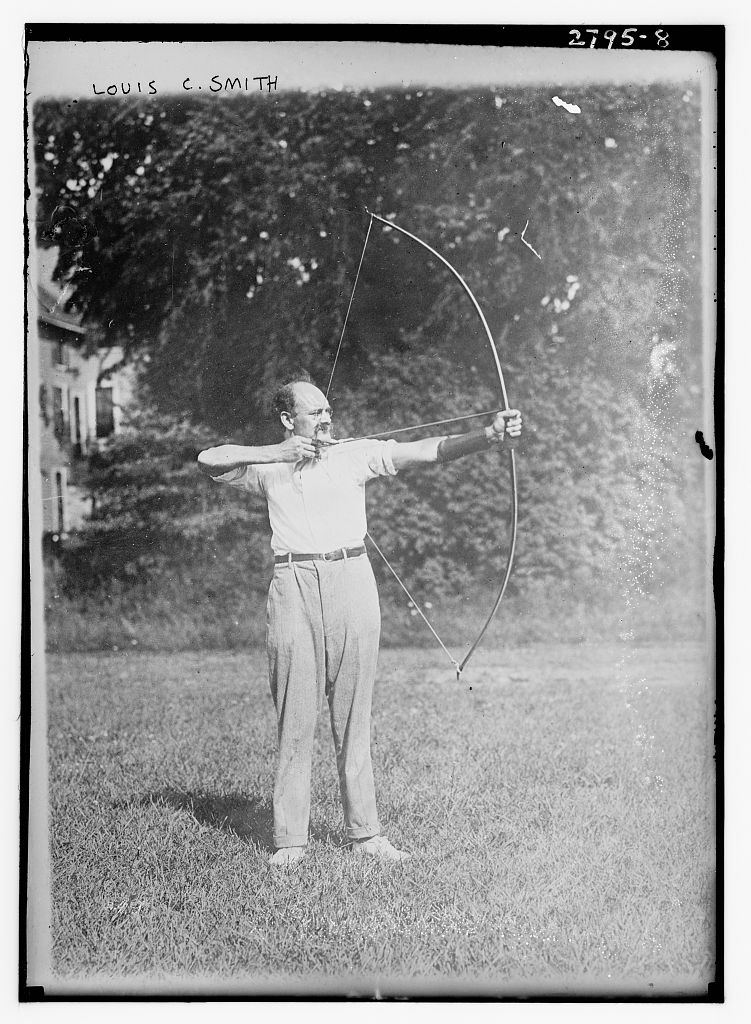
Smith circa 1913

Louis Carter Smith (1870 – April 23, 1961) was an archery champion and historian. He was inducted into the Archery Hall of Fame in 1976. He died on April 23, 1961. His daughter was Dorothy Smith Cummings (1903-1995). He was secretary-treasurer of the National Archery Association for 26 years from 1919 to 1946.
