= Galen Spencer =

American archer (1840–1904)

Medal record

Men's archery

Representing the United States

Olympic Games
Gold medal – first place	1904 St. Louis	Team round

Galen Carter Spencer (September 19, 1840, in New York, New York – October 19, 1904, in Greenwich, Connecticut) was an American archer who competed in the 1904 Summer Olympics. He was also a minister of the Methodist Episcopal Church. He won the gold medal in the team competition. In the Double American round he finished thirteenth. He died exactly one month after winning the medal.
