= Jorma Sandelin =

Finnish archer (1936–2026)

Personal information
- Nationality: Finnish
- Born: 4 June 1936 Kristinestad, Finland
- Died: 14 November 2026 (aged 90)

Sport
- Sport: Archery

Jorma Sandelin (4 June 1936 – 14 November 2026) was a Finnish archer. He competed in the men's individual event at the 1972 Summer Olympics.
