= Jean Lee (archer) =

American archer (1925–2010)

Medal record

Women's Archery

Representing United States

World Championships
Gold medal – first place	1950 Copenhagen	Individual
Gold medal – first place	1952 Brussels	Individual
Gold medal – first place	1952 Brussels	Team

Jean Lee (also Jean Lee Lombardo) (1925–2010) was a former World Champion archer who represented the United States.

Lee took up archery while studying at the University of Massachusetts. She dominated the world of competitive archery in the late 1940s and early 1950s, winning four consecutive national titles between 1948 and 1951, and consecutive world championships in 1950 and 1952. She broke numerous world records in the process, and at the 1950 World Championships became the first woman to attain a higher score than the winner of the men's championship Hans Deutgen. Lee caused controversy as an early user of artificial points of aim (the 1950 World Championships were the first where the use of them was allowed). She was forced to retire from the sport in 1952 due to injury, and was inducted into the Archery Hall of Fame in 1975.
