= 1950 World Archery Championships =

- Location: Copenhagen, Denmark
- Start date: 26 July
- End date: 30 July
- Competitors: 112

The 1950 World Archery Championships was the 14th edition of the event. It was held in Copenhagen, Denmark on 26–30 July 1950 and was organised by World Archery Federation (FITA).

In the men's individual competition, Hans Deutgen won his fourth straight championship, a record which remains unbroken. Uponn being presented with his gold medal, he passed it to the third place Russ Reynolds, who was suffering from leukemia.

== Medals summary ==
=== Recurve ===
Event	Gold	Silver	Bronze
Men's individual	Hans Deutgen; Sweden	Einar Tang-Holbeck; Denmark	Russ Reynolds; United States
Women's individual	Jean Lee; United States	Jean Richards; United States	Ragnhild Windahl; Sweden
Men's team	Denmark	Sweden	Czechoslovakia
Women's team	Finland	Sweden	United Kingdom

== Medals table ==
Rank	Nation	Gold	Silver	Bronze	Total
1	Sweden	1	2	1	4
2	United States	1	1	1	3
3	Denmark	1	1	0	2
4	Finland	1	0	0	1
5	Czechoslovakia	0	0	1	1
5	Great Britain	0	0	1	1
Totals (6 entries)		4	4	4	12
