= Louis Maxson =

American archer (1855–1916)

Medal record

Men's archery

Representing the United States

Olympic Games
Gold medal – first place	1904 St. Louis	Team round

Louis William Maxson (July 2, 1855 – July 2, 1916) was an American archer who competed in the 1904 Summer Olympics. He was born in Herbertville, California and died in Baltimore, Maryland. Maxson won the gold medal in the team competition. He finished twelfth in both the Double American round and the Double York round.
