= Bowyer =

Craftsman who makes bows for archery

Occupation
- Occupation type: Vocation
- Activity sectors: Recreation, hunting

Description
- Fields of employment: Craft
- Related jobs: Fletcher

A bowyer is a master-craftsman who makes bows. Though this was once a widespread profession, the importance of bowyers and of bows was diminished by the introduction of gunpowder weaponry. However, the trade has survived and many bowyers continue to produce high-end bows.

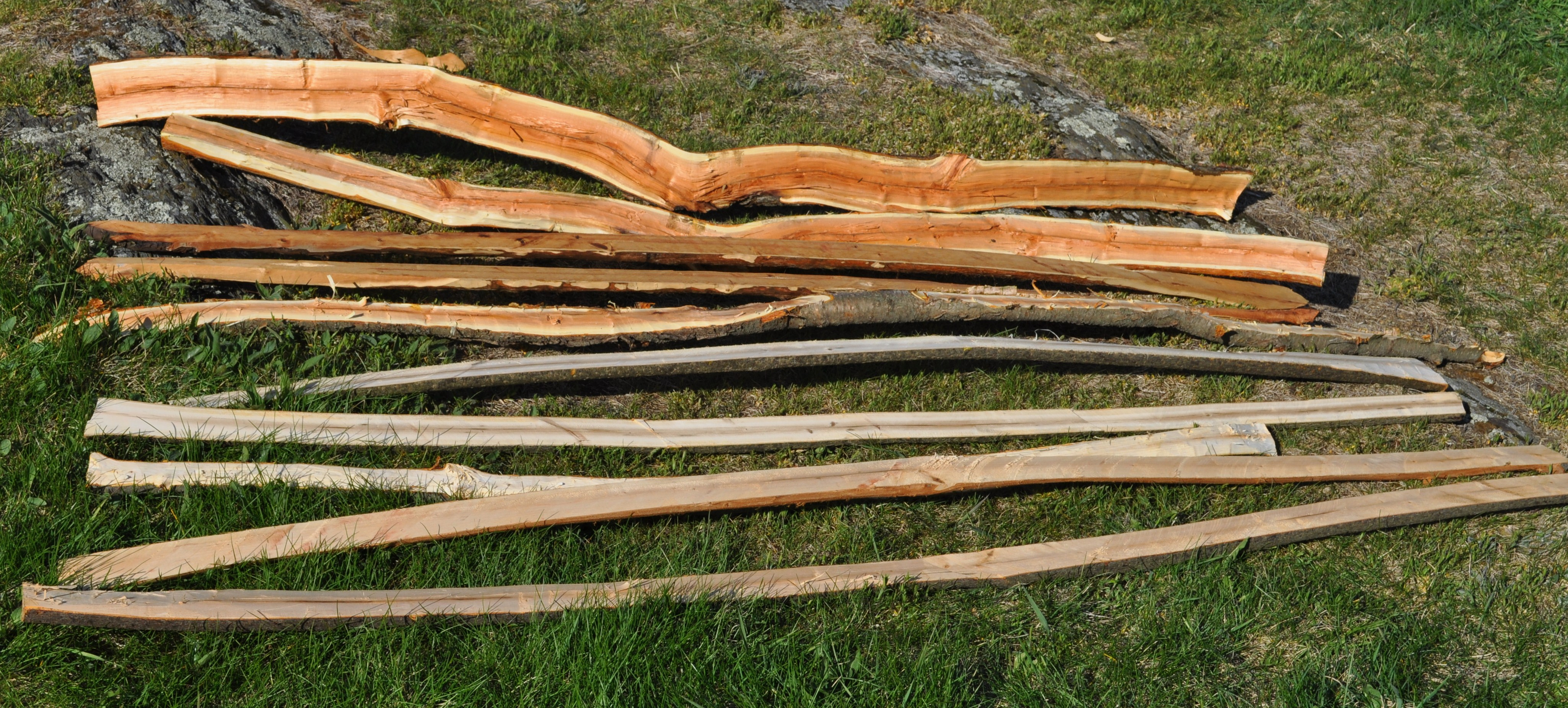
Freshly cut wood split into bow staves.

== History ==
Historically, a wide variety of bows have been produced for purposes ranging from food gathering and warfare to recreation. Who created these bows depended mainly on the type of bow being produced, but also on the quantity required. The skills required tend to divide traditional bowyers into two groups:

=== Makers of self bows ===
In clans or social groups that used wooden self bows (bows made entirely from one piece of wood) bows would sometimes be crafted by the individual user; however, even with fairly simple bow designs it was often easier to rely upon a few skilled bowyers within the group. By working in groups more could be accomplished. In medieval England, for example, professional bowyers produced thousands of bows required for that country's military. These bowyers could reportedly make an English longbow in as little as two hours. Wooden selfbows normally take from 5–15 hours of work depending on the skill of the bowyer and the challenges set by the piece of wood. Modern amateurs find it satisfying to make functional self bows with beginner's skills and few tools.

=== Makers of composite bows ===
Cultures that used composite bows (bows made of several materials, classically horn, wood, and sinew) had to rely on skilled craftsmen. Composite bows could be made relatively short, heavily recurved, and highly effective but the constituent materials had to be put under enormous stress and the bow's limbs needed to be perfectly aligned. These demands required experienced bowyers who were willing to spend a great deal of time crafting their weapons. Cultures such as the Mongols made effective military use of powerful composite bows for millennia; the limited records indicate that only a minority of men in these cultures ever made bows.

== Bowyers in the United States ==
In the United States, many bowyers were inspired by Ishi, the last member of the Yahi, who lived most of his life outside modern culture. Ishi first contacted US citizens in 1911. His friend Saxton Pope learned some of his skills and spread them to bowyers including Howard Hill, Ben Pearson and Fred Bear.

== See also ==
- Fletcher

== Sources and recommended reading ==
- (1992) The Traditional Bowyer's Bible Volume 1. The Lyons Press. ISBN 1-58574-085-3
- (1992) The Traditional Bowyer's Bible Volume 2. The Lyons Press. ISBN 1-58574-086-1
- (1994) The Traditional Bowyer's Bible Volume 3. The Lyons Press. ISBN 1-58574-087-X
- (2008) The Traditional Bowyer's Bible Volume 4. The Lyons Press. ISBN 1-59921-453-9
