= Emily Woodruff =

American archer

Medal record

Women's archery

Representing the United States

Olympic Games
Gold medal – first place	1904 St. Louis	Team round

Emily Smiley Woodruff (April 19, 1846 in Cincinnati, Ohio – March 28, 1916 in Berwyn, Illinois) was an American archer who shot for the Cincinnati Archers and a member of the American squad that won the team round gold medals at the 1904 Summer Olympics held in St Louis.

Aged 58 during the time of the 1904 Summer Olympics, Woodruff competed in all three women's archery events at the games, coming fourth in both the women's double Columbia Round and the women's double national round. Woodruff was also a member of the Cincinnati Archers team which won the gold medal women's team round although there is some debate as to whether this is a legitimate Olympic result because no other teams may have taken part.

Woodruff's husband, Charles Woodruff, also competed in the 1904 Olympics, and won a silver medal in the Men's Team Round as a member of the Cincinnati Archers team.

Woodruff died in Illinois in March 1916 aged 69 and is buried at Spring Grove Cemetery, Cincinnati, Ohio.
