= Charles Hubbard (archer) =

American archer (1849–1923)

Olympic medal record

Men's Archery
Silver medal – second place	1904 St. Louis	Team round

Charles Randolph Hubbard (August 20, 1849 – March 28, 1923) was an American archer who competed in the 1904 Summer Olympics. He was born in Cincinnati, Ohio and died in Hamilton, Ohio. Hubbard won the silver medal in the team competition. In the Double American round he finished 11th.
