= William Thompson (archer) =

American archer (1848–1918)

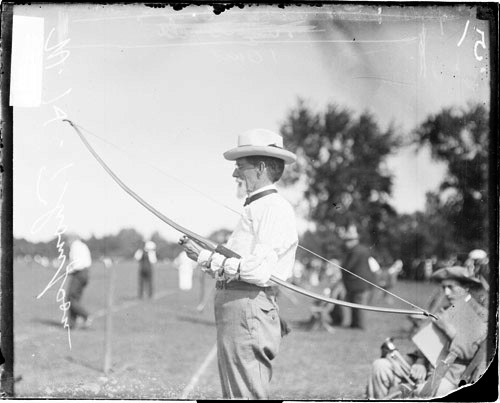
- William Thompson

Medal record

Men's archery

Representing the United States

Olympic Games
| Gold medal – first place | 1904 St. Louis | Team round |
| Bronze medal – third place | 1904 St. Louis | Double York round |
| Bronze medal – third place | 1904 St. Louis | Double American round |

Will Henry Thompson (March 10, 1848 – August 12, 1918) was an American archer, poet and lawyer. His brother Maurice, he was a founder of the National Archery Association in 1879 in Crawfordsville, Indiana. Maurice was the inaugural president and William was president in 1882, 1903 and 1904.

William won two bronze medals in Archery at the 1904 Summer Olympics in Missouri in the double York round, when Robert Williams archer Robert Williams won silver and his second bronze in the double American round. In the team competition he won the gold medal.

He was born in Calhoun, Georgia and died in Seattle, Washington. His Seattle house is an 18 room mansion in the Mount Baker district that he lived in from 1897 until 1917 is now an official Seattle Landmark and is also on the National Register of Historic Places.

His most notable literary work is his 1888 poem of his experiences in the Civil War, "High Tide at Gettysburg."
