= William Clark (archer) =

American archer (1842–1913)

- Born: March 1842; Cincinnati, Ohio, United States
- Died: October 20, 1913 (aged 70–71); Knoxville, Tennessee, United States

Olympic medal record

Men's Archery
Silver medal – second place	1904 St. Louis	Team round

William Allen Clark (March 1842 in Cincinnati, Ohio – October 20, 1913 in Knoxville, Tennessee) was an American archer.

In 1904 Summer Olympics he took part in the Olympic Games in Saint Louis, where he won the silver medal in the team round event, as a member of the Cincinnati Archers archery program. In Double American round he was sixth.

He won the national archery championships of 1886, 1887, and 1897 and several Ohio championships.
