= Lida Howell =

American archer (1859–1938)

Medal record

Women's archery

Representing the United States

Olympic Games
Gold medal – first place	1904 St. Louis	Double national round
Gold medal – first place	1904 St. Louis	Double Columbia round
Gold medal – first place	1904 St. Louis	Team round

Matilda "Lida" Scott Howell (August 28, 1859 – December 20, 1938) was an American archer who competed in the early twentieth century. She won three gold medals in Archery at the 1904 Summer Olympics in Missouri in the double national and Columbia rounds and for the US team. She was 45 when she won the medals.

== Career ==
Matilda Scott was born in Lebanon, Ohio. Her father, Thomas Scott, was the oldest archer ever to have competed in the Olympics. Scott appeared as a competitor for the United States at the 1904 Summer Olympics, representing the Cincinnati Archers and competing in both the women's double York round and the women's double American round. The events were both held on September 19, 1904. In the women's double American round, Scott was one of 22 competitors. She ranked in seventeenth place with a score of 562, hitting 135 targets across three phases, 40 yards, 50 yards, and 60 yards. The women's double York round, where Scott was one of sixteen competitors, saw her rank in thirteenth place, having accumulated a score of 375, having managed to hit 99 targets again across three phases, this time 60 yards, 80 yards, and 100 yards. She died in Norwood, Ohio.

Archery was an event in five of the earliest Olympics and, as it had been an acceptable leisure sport for upper class women for a long time, they were allowed to participate. America's first female gold medalist in archery was Lida Scott. Lida Scott became interested in archery around 1878. It was a result of articles she had read that were written by Maurice Thompson. In 1881, she won the Ohio State archery championship. She repeated her victory in 1882. In the spring of 1883 she married Millard C. Howell and also won her first national championship. Her dedication to the sport continued and by 1907, she had won seventeen national titles. She competed in archery at the St Louis Olympic Games in 1904, winning two gold medals. Her score for the national round archery was 620 and for Columbia round archery, 867. Her scores in the 1895 championship set records which were not broken until 1931 – 36 years later. As an archer, she was clearly a woman ahead of her time. In 1904 a reporter from the Cincinnati Times Star interviewed Mrs. Howell after winning her 15th championship. When asked why she preferred archery over other sports, she replied, "Archery is a picturesque game, the range with its smooth green and distant glowing target with its gold and radiating red, blue, black, and white, the white-garbed players, with graceful big bows and flying arrows, makes a beautiful picture." The reporter commented that the love of archery with her is surely inborn. She retired from National Competition in 1907. After the 1920 Olympics, archery was discontinued until 1972 due to a lack of standardized international rules.
