= Leonie Taylor =

American archer

Personal information
- Born: March 1870 Cincinnati, Ohio
- Died: 9 March 1936 Mount Sterling, Kentucky
Medal record
Women's archery
Representing United States
Olympic Games
Gold medal – first place	1904 St. Louis	Team round

Leonora Josephine "Leonie" Taylor (March 1870 – March 9, 1936) was an American archer who was a member of the American squad that won the team round gold medals at the 1904 Summer Olympics. Her sister was Mabel Taylor who competed against her at the same games.
