= Samuel Duvall =

American archer (1836–1908)

Olympic medal record

Men's Archery

Representing the United States
Silver medal – second place	1904 St. Louis	Team round

Samuel Harding Duvall (March 11, 1836 in Liberty, Indiana – September 26, 1908 in Liberty, Indiana) was an American archer who competed in the 1904 Summer Olympics.

Duvall won the silver medal in the team competition. In the Double American round he finished fourteenth.
