= Harry Drake =

American archer (1915–1997)

Harry Eugene Drake
- Born: May 7, 1915; Kansas
- Died: July 28, 1997 (aged 82)
- Occupation: Bowyer
- Known for: Bowyery, world record for longest shot with a longbow

Harry Eugene Drake (born in Kansas on May 7, 1915 – July 28, 1997 died in Nevada) was an archer and bowyer. Drake was an early pioneer in work on modern implementations of the composite bow design.

== Biography ==
Drake broke the world record for the longest shot with a footbow on October 24, 1971, with a shot that flew 2,028 yards (1,854 m) (one mile, 268 yards or 1.854 kilometers) The record stood until 1983, when a new mark of 1.873 km was set.
