= Charles Woodruff (archer) =

American archer (1846–1927)

Olympic medal record

Men's Archery
Silver medal – second place	1904 St. Louis	Team round

Charles Sherman Woodruff, Jr. (August 15, 1846 – September 6, 1927) was an American archer who competed in the 1904 Summer Olympics. He was born in Cincinnati, Ohio and died in Chicago.

In 1904 he won the silver medal in the team competition. In the double American round he finished fourth and in the double York round he finished eighth.

His wife, Emily Woodruff, also competed in the 1904 Olympics.
