= Wallace Bryant (archer) =

American archer (1863–1953)

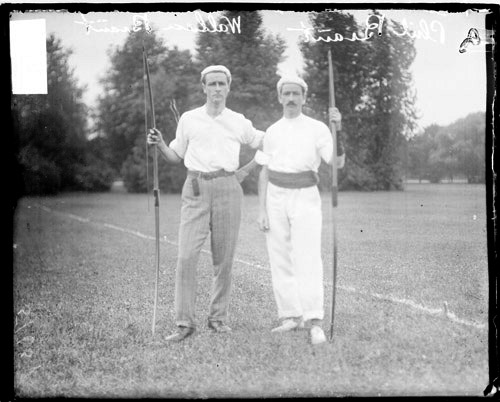
- Wallace Bryant (left) with George Phillip Bryant.

Personal information
- Born: December 19, 1863
- Died: May 2, 1953 (aged 89)
Medal record
Men's Archery
Bronze medal – third place	1904 St. Louis	Team round

Wallace Bryant (December 19, 1863 – May 2, 1953) was an American archer who competed in the 1904 Summer Olympics. He won the bronze medal in the team competition. In the Double York round he finished fourth and in the Double American round he finished eighth. Bryant was also a famous portrait artist.

== Biography ==
Bryant was born in Melrose, Massachusetts to Dexter and Dorcas (Hancock) Bryant. He was the second of seven children. He attended the Massachusetts College of Art and Design (then known as the Massachusetts Normal Art School), graduating in 1884. He also studied at the Académie Julian under Jean-Joseph Benjamin-Constant, Paul Albert Laurens, Albert Francois Fleury, and William-Adolphe Bouguereau.

He married Nanna Matthews Bryant (née Nanna Bolton Matthews) a fellow artist whom he likely met at the Académie Julian, in 1898. They had adjacent studios at the Museum of Fine Arts, Boston in the 1890s. The two divorced around 1919; Bryant moved to Washington, D.C. from Boston around that time.

Bryant's second wife was Marjorie Millard Rice (Bryant); they met in New Hampshire and married in 1923 before moving to Rockport, Massachusetts. They had two children, Edward W.M. Bryant and Richard Hancock Bryant.

Bryant's younger brother, George Bryant, was also on the Boston Archery Club team that earned bronze in the team competition. Before the Games, Wallace was a more accomplished archer than his brother; Wallace had won a national championship in 1903. Wallace was also the first president of the Boston Archery Club, created in 1904. George won both individual events at the Olympics, however, and earned four national titles afterwards.
