= Francis Olympic Field =

Stadium at St. Louis, Missouri

Coordinates: 38°38′52″N 90°18′49″W

Francis Field
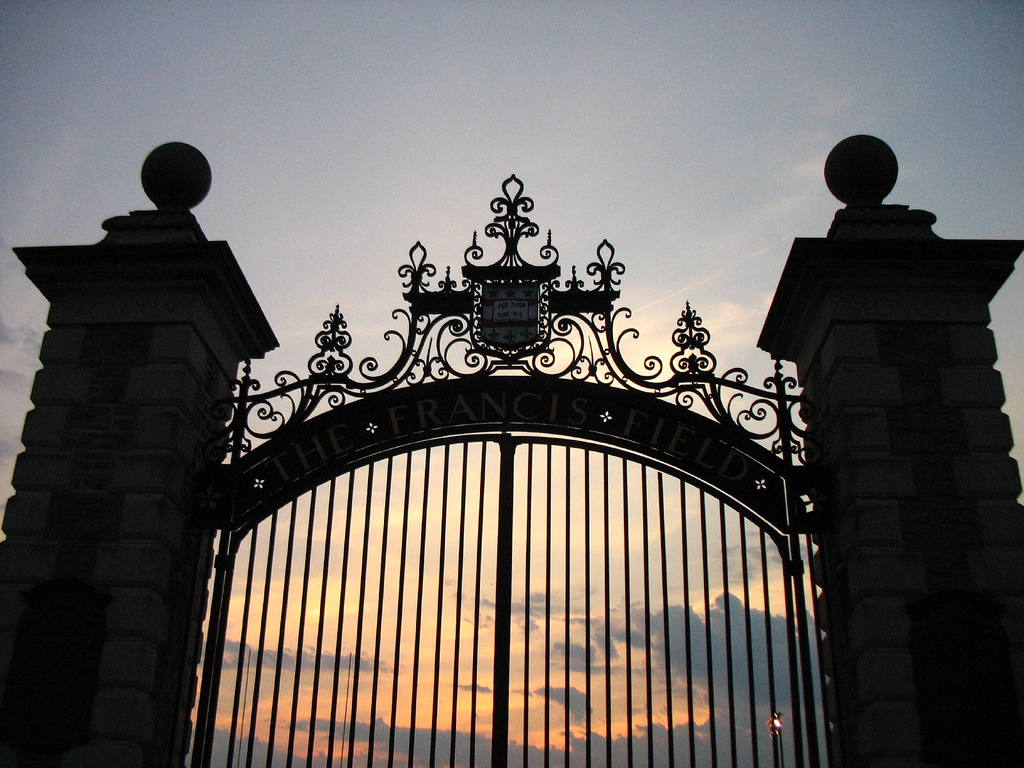
- Interactive map of Francis Field
- Location: St. Louis, Missouri
- Owner: Washington University in St. Louis
- Operator: Washington University in St. Louis
- Capacity: 3,300; 19,000 (previous)
- Surface: IronTurf
- Public transit: MetroBus; Blue; At University City-Big Bend

Construction
- Groundbreaking: 1902; 124 years ago
- Opened: 1904; 122 years ago
- Architect: Cope and Stewardson

Tenants
- Washington University Bears (NCAA) (1905–present); St. Louis Stars (NASL) (1975–77)

Website
- washubears.com/sports/2022/6/6/facilities-francis-field.aspx

Francis Olympic Field is a stadium at Washington University in St. Louis that was used as the main venue for the 1904 Summer Olympics. It is currently used by the university's track and field, cross country, football, and soccer teams. It is located in St. Louis County, Missouri on the far western edge of the university's Danforth Campus. Built in time for the Louisiana Purchase Exposition (1904 St. Louis World's Fair), the stadium once had a 19,000-person seating capacity, but stadium renovations in 1984 reduced the capacity to 3,300 people. It is one of the oldest sports venues west of the Mississippi River that is still in use. Francis Olympic Field now uses artificial turf that can be configured for both soccer and football.

Known at its opening as World's Fair Stadium and then as Washington University Stadium or simply "the Stadium", the venue was renamed as Francis Field in October 1907 for David R. Francis, a former Missouri governor and president of the Louisiana Purchase Exposition. The word "Olympic" was added in 2019 to reflect its role in the 1904 Summer Olympics.

== Overview ==
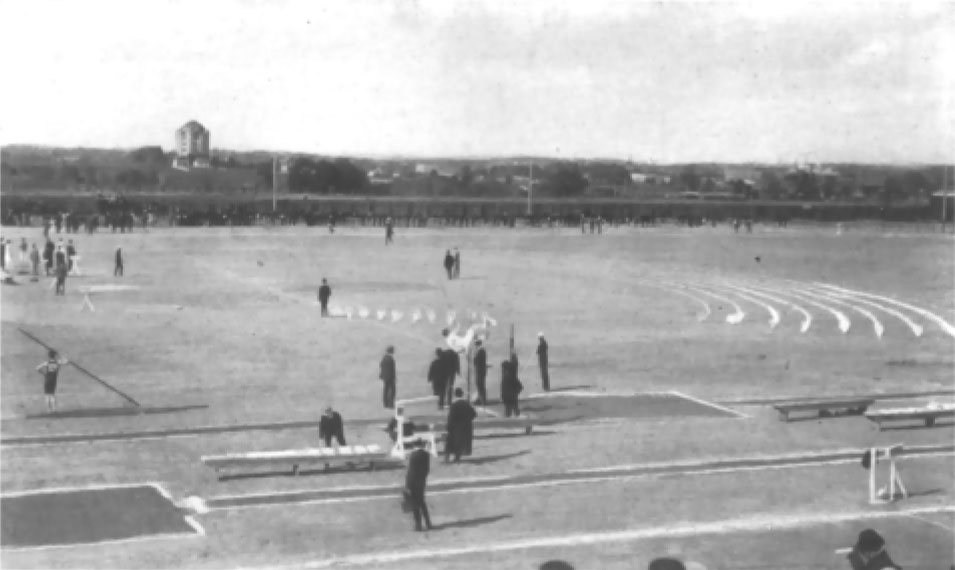
Francis Field during the 1904 Summer Olympics

The 1904 Summer Olympics (the first to be held in the Western Hemisphere) were given to St. Louis, Missouri as a result of the efforts of David Rowland Francis, for whom the stadium and accompanying gymnasium are named. Built in 1902, Francis Olympic Field's permanent stands represent one of the first applications of reinforced concrete technology. Both the stadium and its gymnasium are U.S. National Historic Landmarks. During the 1904 Games, the stadium hosted the archery, athletics, cycling, football, gymnastics, lacrosse, roque, tug of war, weightlifting, and wrestling events. The tennis events took place at some dirt courts located outside the stadium.

Following the 1904 Olympics, the stadium became the permanent home of the Washington University Bears, who were formerly known as the Pikers. From the 1920s through the 1950s, the Bears played before crowds of as many as 19,000 people, competing against universities such as Notre Dame, Nebraska, and Boston College, with half of the spectators in temporary wooden stands. The Bears now play as an NCAA Division III team.

In the summer of 2004, Francis Olympic Field had its natural grass replaced with artificial FieldTurf.

== Notable events ==
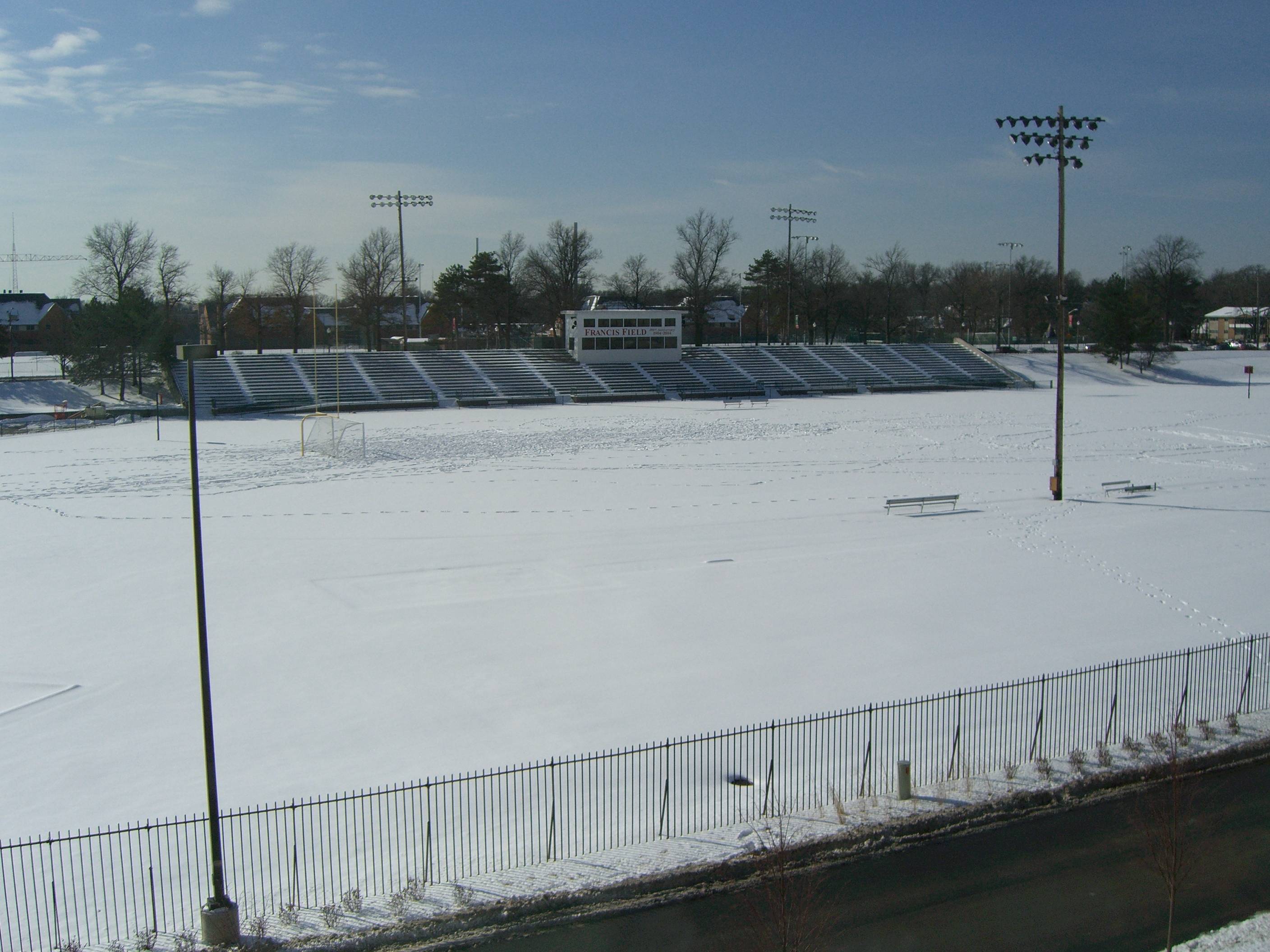
Francis Field in January 2009

On June 1, 1915, Jackson Scholz of Soldan High School, in the St. Louis high school interscholastic meet, broke the meet record in the 100-yard dash. It was the first noteworthy win in a legendary career. At the University of Missouri, he became the fastest collegian in the country. He competed in three Olympics (1920, '24, '28), winning two gold medals and a silver. He was portrayed in the Oscar-winning film Chariots of Fire.

Francis Olympic Field is an annual host for the American Cancer Society's Relay for Life event.

The adjacent Francis Gymnasium has hosted four U.S. presidential debates in 1992, 2000, 2004, and 2016 and the vice-presidential debate in 2008.

During the 1984 and 1996 Olympic Torch relays, the Olympic Flame passed by Francis Olympic Field on its way to the site of the Olympic Games.

Francis Olympic Field hosted the 1986 AAU/USA National Junior Olympic Games, the first and second National Senior Olympic Games, and the 1985 NCAA Division III National Men's Soccer Championship.

In July 1994, Francis Olympic Field served as a centerpiece for the U.S. Olympic Festival as 3,000 athletes were housed on the campus for the country's top amateur sporting events.

The stadium was used by the St. Louis Stars soccer team from 1969 to 1970 and from 1975 to 1977, before their 1978 move to Anaheim, California, where they became the California Surf.

Events and tenants
Preceded by Public Schools Stadium; Brown Stadium; California Memorial Stadium	Host of the College Cup; 1962; 1965; 1967	Succeeded by Rutgers Stadium; California Memorial Stadium; Grant Field
